= Gymnastics at the 1952 Summer Olympics – Women's vault =

Olympic gymnastics event

Women's vault at the Games of the XV Olympiad
- Venue: Messuhalli, Exhibition Hall II
- Date: 22–23 July 1952
- Competitors: 134 from 18 nations
- Winning score: 19.20

Medalists
1st place, gold medalist(s)		Ekaterina Kalinchuk	Soviet Union
2nd place, silver medalist(s)		Maria Gorokhovskaya	Soviet Union
3rd place, bronze medalist(s)		Galina Minaicheva	Soviet Union

The women's vault competition at the 1952 Summer Olympics was held at Messuhalli, Exhibition Hall II from 22 to 23 July. It was the first appearance of the event, though vault exercises were part of the women's team all-around events in 1928, 1936, and 1948.

== Competition format ==
The gymnastics format continued to use the aggregation format. Each nation entered a team of eight gymnasts or up to three individual gymnasts. All entrants in the gymnastics competitions performed both a compulsory exercise and a voluntary exercise for each apparatus. The four apparatus that would become standard (floor, balance beam, uneven bars, and vault) were all used in the same Games for the first time.

No separate finals were contested.

For each individual exercise, five judges gave scores from 0 to 10 in one-tenth point increments. The top and bottom scores were discarded and the remaining three scores averaged to give the exercise total. Thus, exercise scores ranged from 0 to 10 and apparatus scores from 0 to 20.

Each competitor had two tries for each of the compulsory and voluntary vaults, with the better score to count.

== Results ==
Rank	Gymnast	Nation	Compulsory	Voluntary	Total
1st place, gold medalist(s)	Ekaterina Kalinchuk	Soviet Union	9.70	9.50	19.20
2nd place, silver medalist(s)	Maria Gorokhovskaya	Soviet Union	9.63	9.56	19.19
3rd place, bronze medalist(s)	Galina Minaicheva	Soviet Union	9.73	9.43	19.16
4	Medea Jugeli	Soviet Union	9.73	9.40	19.13
5	Galina Urbanovich	Soviet Union	9.70	9.40	19.10
6	Nina Bocharova	Soviet Union	9.80	9.23	19.03
7	Karin Lindberg	Sweden	9.36	9.43	18.79
7	Helena Rakoczy	Poland	9.53	9.26	18.79
9	Mária Kövi-Zalai	Hungary	9.46	9.30	18.76
9	Lidia Pitteri	Italy	9.50	9.23	18.73
11	Edit Perényi-Weckinger	Hungary	9.33	9.30	18.63
12	Pelageya Danilova	Soviet Union	9.46	9.16	18.62
13	Erzsébet Gulyás-Köteles	Hungary	9.30	9.30	18.60
14	Licia Macchini	Italy	9.43	9.16	18.59
14	Ann-Sofi Pettersson-Colling	Sweden	9.36	9.23	18.59
16	Olga Tass	Hungary	9.26	9.30	18.56
16	Miranda Cicognani	Italy	9.43	9.13	18.56
18	Stefania Reindl	Poland	9.46	9.00	18.46
18	Stefania Świerzy	Poland	9.53	8.93	18.46
20	Elisabeth Ostermeyer	Germany	9.30	9.13	18.43
20	Stela Perin	Romania	9.43	9.00	18.43
22	Margit Korondi	Hungary	9.10	9.30	18.40
23	Galina Shamrai	Soviet Union	9.03	9.36	18.39
23	Andrea Bodó	Hungary	9.23	9.16	18.39
25	Vasilka Stancheva	Bulgaria	9.40	8.96	18.36
26	Evy Berggren	Sweden	9.10	9.20	18.30
27	Saltirka Spasova-Tarpova	Bulgaria	9.33	8.96	18.29
27	Brigitte Kiesler	Germany	9.13	9.16	18.29
27	Wolfgard Voß	Germany	9.13	9.16	18.29
30	Hanna Grages	Germany	9.23	9.03	18.26
31	Göta Pettersson	Sweden	9.03	9.20	18.23
31	Huiberdina Krul-van der Nolk van Gogh	Netherlands	9.13	9.10	18.23
33	Eva Věchtová	Czechoslovakia	9.00	9.20	18.20
33	Božena Srncová	Czechoslovakia	9.00	9.20	18.20
35	Jana Rabasová	Czechoslovakia	9.10	9.06	18.16
35	Liliana Scaricabarozzi	Italy	9.30	8.86	18.16
35	Gun Röring	Sweden	9.13	9.03	18.16
38	Irma Walther	Germany	9.20	8.93	18.13
38	Matylda Šínová	Czechoslovakia	9.40	8.73	18.13
40	Elisabetta Durelli	Italy	9.36	8.76	18.12
41	Ágnes Keleti	Hungary	8.90	9.20	18.10
41	Luciana Reali	Italy	9.20	8.90	18.10
43	Grazia Bozzo	Italy	9.03	9.06	18.09
44	Tsvetanka Stancheva	Bulgaria	9.16	8.90	18.06
44	Alena Chadimová	Czechoslovakia	9.23	8.83	18.06
44	Ida Kadlec	Austria	8.93	9.13	18.06
44	Hilde Koop	Germany	9.03	9.03	18.06
43	Penka Prisadashka	Bulgaria	9.30	8.76	18.06
49	Alena Reichová	Czechoslovakia	9.10	8.93	18.03
49	Ivanka Dolzheva	Bulgaria	9.20	8.83	18.03
49	Tanja Žutić	Yugoslavia	9.10	8.66	18.03
52	Ingrid Sandahl	Sweden	8.80	9.20	18.00
53	Lenie Gerrietsen	Netherlands	8.93	9.06	17.99
54	Pat Hirst	Great Britain	8.93	9.03	17.96
54	Nada Spasić	Yugoslavia	9.10	8.86	17.96
54	Marjorie Raistrick	Great Britain	9.10	8.86	17.96
57	Hana Bobková	Czechoslovakia	8.93	9.00	17.93
57	Renata Bianchi	Italy	9.26	8.66	17.92
58	Ruth Topalian	United States	8.96	8.96	17.92
58	Alexandra Lemoine	France	9.16	8.76	17.92
61	Sonja Rožman	Yugoslavia	8.93	8.96	17.89
62	Ginette Durand	France	8.86	8.96	17.82
62	Arja Lehtinen	Finland	8.86	8.96	17.82
64	Vappu Salonen	Finland	8.96	8.83	17.79
65	Marian Barone	United States	8.90	8.86	17.76
65	Eveline Slavici	Romania	9.36	8.40	17.76
65	Gertrude Winnige-Barosch	Austria	9.10	8.66	17.76
65	Hjördis Nordin	Sweden	8.73	9.03	17.76
65	Norveig Karlsen	Norway	8.93	8.83	17.76
70	Gwynedd Lewis-Lingard	Great Britain	9.13	8.60	17.73
71	Inge Sedlmaier	Germany	9.16	8.56	17.72
72	Irén Daruházi-Karcsics	Hungary	8.66	9.03	17.69
73	Trude Gollner-Kolar	Austria	8.80	8.86	17.66
73	Irene Hirst	Great Britain	8.93	8.70	17.63
74	Grethe Werner	Norway	8.93	8.70	17.63
76	Věra Vančurová	Czechoslovakia	9.16	8.46	17.62
76	Margo Morgan	Great Britain	8.90	8.63	17.53
78	Nanny Simon	Netherlands	8.90	8.60	17.50
79	Dorota Horzonek-Jokiel	Poland	9.13	8.36	17.49
79	Cissy Davies	Great Britain	8.86	8.63	17.49
81	Clara Schroth-Lomady	United States	8.63	8.83	17.46
81	Valerie Mullins	Great Britain	8.83	8.63	17.46
83	Raili Tuominen-Hämäläinen	Finland	8.60	8.83	17.43
84	Irène Pittelioen	France	8.43	8.96	17.39
84	Anka Drinić	Yugoslavia	8.73	8.93	17.39
86	Honorata Marcińczak	Poland	8.96	8.40	17.36
86	Tootje Selbach	Netherlands	8.36	9.00	17.36
86	Ada Smolnikar	Yugoslavia	8.73	8.63	17.36
86	Dália da Cunha-Sammer	Portugal	8.33	9.03	17.36
86	Maria Laura Amorim	Portugal	8.80	8.56	17.36
91	Helga Bîrsan	Romania	9.06	8.26	17.32
91	Elisabeta Abrudeanu	Romania	9.06	8.26	17.32
93	Zofia Kowalczyk	Poland	8.96	8.33	17.29
94	Ileana Gyarfaş	Romania	8.70	8.56	17.26
94	Margaret Thomas-Neale	Great Britain	8.83	8.43	17.26
96	Vanja Blomberg	Sweden	8.23	9.00	17.23
96	Ruth Grulkowski	United States	8.90	8.30	17.20
98	Hedwig Traindl	Austria	8.66	8.53	17.19
98	Colette Hué	France	8.86	8.33	17.19
100	Yordanka Yovkova	Bulgaria	9.13	8.03	17.16
101	Gertrude Gries	Austria	8.40	8.66	17.06
101	Dorothy Dalton	United States	8.46	8.66	17.06
103	Annie Ros	Netherlands	8.00	8.93	16.93
104	Bergljot Sandvik-Johansen	Norway	8.53	8.36	16.89
105	Colette Fanara	France	8.76	8.10	16.86
106	Jo Cox-Ladru	Netherlands	8.03	8.80	16.83
107	Gerti Fesl	Austria	8.96	7.80	16.76
108	Rayna Grigorova	Bulgaria	8.80	7.93	16.73
109	Madeleine Jouffroy	France	9.00	7.70	16.70
101	Marija Ivandekić	Yugoslavia	8.40	8.16	16.56
111	Olga Göllner	Romania	8.13	8.40	16.53
112	Liliane Montagne	France	8.73	7.70	16.43
113	Pirkko Vilppunen	Finland	8.16	8.26	16.42
114	Marie Hoesly	United States	7.73	8.60	16.33
115	Olga Munteanu	Romania	8.16	8.06	16.22
116	Raili Hoviniemi	Finland	7.90	8.30	16.20
117	Lydia Zeitlhofer	Germany	7.50	8.63	16.13
118	Edeltraud Schramm	Austria	7.36	8.40	15.76
118	Maila Nisula	Finland	7.86	7.90	15.76
120	Milica Rožman	Yugoslavia	6.83	8.83	15.66
121	Urszula Łukomska	Poland	7.36	8.26	15.62
121	Pirkko Pyykönen	Finland	7.76	7.86	15.62
123	Hildegard Grill	Austria	7.86	7.73	15.59
124	Jeanette Vogelbacher	France	8.00	7.56	15.56
125	Barbara Wilk-Ślizowska	Poland	7.33	7.96	15.29
126	Toetie Selbach	Netherlands	7.36	7.90	15.26
127	Raija Simola	Finland	8.16	6.73	14.89
128	Cootje van Kampen-Tonneman	Netherlands	7.26	6.33	13.59
129	Stoyanka Angelova	Bulgaria	5.93	7.40	13.33
130	Tereza Kočiš	Yugoslavia	0.00	9.10	9.10
131	Meta Elste	United States	—	8.66	8.66
132	Teofila Băiașu	Romania	-	8.26	8.26
133	Natália Silva	Portugal	0.00	7.56	7.56
134	Doris Kirkman	United States	7.10	—	7.10
