= Gymnastics at the 1952 Summer Olympics – Women's artistic individual all-around =

Olympic gymnastics event

Women's artistic individual all-around at the Games of the XV Olympiad
- Venue: Messuhalli, Exhibition Hall II
- Date: 22–23 July 1952
- Competitors: 134 from 18 nations
- Winning score: 76.78

Medalists
1st place, gold medalist(s)		Maria Gorokhovskaya	Soviet Union
2nd place, silver medalist(s)		Nina Bocharova	Soviet Union
3rd place, bronze medalist(s)		Margit Korondi	Hungary

The women's artistic individual all-around competition at the 1952 Summer Olympics was held at Messuhalli, Exhibition Hall II from 22 to 23 July. It was the first appearance of the event.

== Competition format ==
The gymnastics format continued to use the aggregation format. Each nation entered a team of eight gymnasts or up to three individual gymnasts. All entrants in the gymnastics competitions performed both a compulsory exercise and a voluntary exercise for each apparatus. The four apparatus that would become standard (floor, balance beam, uneven bars, and vault) were all used in the same Games for the first time.

No separate finals were contested.

For each individual exercise, five judges gave scores from 0 to 10 in one-tenth point increments. The top and bottom scores were discarded and the remaining three scores averaged to give the exercise total. Thus, exercise scores ranged from 0 to 10, apparatus scores from 0 to 20, and individual totals from 0 to 80.

For the vault, each competitor had two tries for each of the compulsory and voluntary vaults with the better score to count. For the other three apparatus exercises, the competitor had the option to make a second try only on the compulsory exercise—with the second attempt counting regardless of whether it was better than the first. For both compulsory and voluntary floor exercises, and voluntary exercises in the non-floor, non-vault apparatuses, only one attempt could be made.

== Results ==
Rank	Gymnast	Nation	Exercise results												Total
Rank	Gymnast	Nation	Floor (gymnastics)			Balance beam			Parallel bars			Vault (gymnastics)			Total
Rank	Gymnast	Nation	C	V	T	C	V	T	C	V	T	C	V	T	Total
1st place, gold medalist(s)	Maria Gorokhovskaya	Soviet Union	9.50	9.70	19.20	9.43	9.70	19.13	9.63	9.63	19.26	9.63	9.56	19.19	76.78
2nd place, silver medalist(s)	Nina Bocharova	Soviet Union	9.40	9.30	18.70	9.46	9.76	19.22	9.56	9.43	18.99	9.80	9.23	19.03	75.94
3rd place, bronze medalist(s)	Margit Korondi	Hungary	9.40	9.60	19.00	9.46	9.56	19.02	9.70	9.70	19.40	9.10	9.30	18.40	75.82
4	Galina Minaicheva	Soviet Union	9.36	9.60	18.96	9.13	9.53	18.66	9.36	9.53	18.89	9.73	9.43	19.16	75.67
5	Galina Urbanovich	Soviet Union	9.43	9.56	18.99	9.40	9.53	18.93	9.16	9.46	18.62	9.70	9.40	19.10	75.64
6	Ágnes Keleti	Hungary	9.50	9.86	19.36	9.43	9.53	18.96	9.46	9.70	19.16	8.90	9.20	18.10	75.58
7	Pelageya Danilova	Soviet Union	9.23	9.43	18.60	9.26	9.50	18.76	9.43	9.56	18.99	9.46	9.16	18.62	75.03
8	Galina Shamrai	Soviet Union	9.23	9.63	18.86	9.43	9.36	18.79	9.33	9.60	18.93	9.03	9.36	18.39	74.97
9	Medea Jugeli	Soviet Union	9.30	9.30	18.60	9.13	9.36	18.49	9.23	9.50	18.73	9.73	9.40	19.13	74.95
10	Edit Perényi-Weckinger	Hungary	9.16	9.66	18.82	9.06	9.30	18.36	9.40	9.56	18.96	9.33	9.30	18.63	74.77
11	Olga Tass	Hungary	9.23	9.66	18.89	9.40	9.46	18.86	9.30	9.10	18.40	9.26	9.30	18.56	74.71
12	Erzsébet Gulyás-Köteles	Hungary	9.26	9.73	18.99	9.06	9.33	18.39	9.23	9.40	18.63	9.30	9.30	18.60	74.61
13	Ekaterina Kalinchuk	Soviet Union	8.83	8.90	17.73	8.96	9.36	18.32	9.30	9.36	18.66	9.70	9.50	19.20	73.91
14	Eva Věchtová	Czechoslovakia	9.36	9.23	18.59	9.03	9.53	18.56	9.16	9.36	18.52	9.00	9.20	18.20	73.87
15	Mária Kövi-Zalai	Hungary	9.16	9.43	18.59	8.60	9.30	17.90	9.26	9.36	18.62	9.46	9.30	18.76	73.87
16	Tsvetanka Stancheva	Bulgaria	9.16	9.20	18.36	9.43	9.43	18.86	9.03	9.36	18.39	9.16	8.90	18.06	73.67
17	Karin Lindberg	Sweden	9.23	9.10	18.33	8.76	9.26	18.02	9.03	8.96	17.99	9.36	9.43	18.79	73.13
18	Ivanka Dolzheva	Bulgaria	9.06	8.96	18.02	9.36	9.30	18.66	8.90	9.20	18.10	9.20	8.83	18.03	72.81
19	Saltirka Spasova-Tarpova	Bulgaria	9.03	8.43	17.46	9.26	9.33	18.59	8.76	9.20	17.96	9.33	8.96	18.29	72.30
20	Alena Chadimová	Czechoslovakia	9.20	9.03	18.23	8.83	9.33	18.16	8.50	9.30	17.80	9.23	8.83	18.06	72.25
21	Jana Rabasová	Czechoslovakia	9.03	8.76	17.79	8.93	9.13	18.06	9.06	9.06	18.12	9.10	9.06	18.16	72.13
22	Božena Srncová	Czechoslovakia	9.00	8.56	17.56	9.13	9.06	18.19	8.93	9.20	18.13	9.00	9.20	18.20	72.08
23	Gun Röring	Sweden	9.30	8.93	18.23	8.83	9.33	18.16	8.86	8.66	17.52	9.13	9.03	18.16	72.07
24	Irma Walther	Germany	8.80	8.93	17.73	8.80	9.23	18.03	9.06	9.00	18.06	9.20	8.93	18.13	71.95
25	Stela Perin	Romania	9.00	9.13	18.13	8.80	9.13	17.93	8.33	9.03	17.36	9.43	9.00	18.43	71.85
26	Hanna Grages	Germany	9.06	9.03	18.09	8.46	9.13	17.59	8.90	8.93	17.83	9.23	9.03	18.26	71.77
27	Stefania Świerzy	Poland	9.26	8.90	18.16	8.43	9.33	17.76	8.10	9.20	17.30	9.53	8.93	18.46	71.68
28	Andrea Bodó	Hungary	9.16	9.10	18.26	9.03	7.50	16.53	9.33	9.16	18.49	9.23	9.16	18.39	71.67
29	Vasilka Stancheva	Bulgaria	9.10	8.33	17.43	9.16	9.06	18.22	8.73	8.90	17.63	9.40	8.96	18.36	71.64
30	Lidia Pitteri	Italy	8.63	8.86	17.49	8.46	9.03	17.49	9.03	8.86	17.89	9.50	9.23	18.73	71.60
31	Hana Bobková	Czechoslovakia	9.13	8.60	17.73	8.63	9.30	17.93	8.73	9.20	17.93	8.93	9.00	17.93	71.52
32	Miranda Cicognani	Italy	8.83	0.26	18.09	8.56	8.86	17.42	9.10	8.33	17.43	9.43	9.13	18.56	71.50
33	Matylda Šínová	Czechoslovakia	9.03	8.40	17.43	8.73	9.36	18.06	8.46	9.36	17.82	9.40	8.73	18.13	71.47
34	Věra Vančurová	Czechoslovakia	9.20	8.76	17.96	9.00	9.50	18.50	8.10	9.20	17.30	9.16	8.46	17.62	71.38
35	Licia Macchini	Italy	8.90	8.73	17.63	8.23	8.96	17.19	9.03	8.80	17.83	9.43	9.16	18.59	71.24
36	Evy Berggren	Sweden	8.86	9.03	17.89	8.26	9.36	17.62	8.56	8.70	17.26	9.10	9.20	18.30	71.07
37	Göta Pettersson	Sweden	8.86	9.03	17.89	8.40	9.03	17.43	8.86	8.56	17.42	9.03	9.20	18.23	70.97
38	Elisabeth Ostermeyer	Germany	9.00	8.63	17.63	8.36	8.70	17.06	8.86	8.93	17.79	9.30	9.13	18.43	70.91
38	Stefania Reindl	Poland	9.06	9.00	18.06	7.43	9.10	16.53	8.56	9.30	17.86	9.46	9.00	18.46	70.91
40	Irén Daruházi-Karcsics	Hungary	9.03	9.00	18.03	9.13	7.42	16.56	9.06	9.53	18.59	8.66	9.03	17.69	70.87
41	Liliana Scaricabarozzi	Italy	8.70	8.96	17.66	8.60	8.70	17.30	8.96	8.73	17.69	9.30	8.86	18.16	70.81
42	Grazia Bozzo	Italy	8.43	9.33	17.76	8.46	8.83	17.29	8.90	8.73	17.63	9.03	9.06	18.09	70.77
43	Helena Rakoczy	Poland	9.26	9.03	18.29	8.26	9.40	17.66	6.60	9.40	16.00	9.53	9.26	18.79	70.74
44	Ann-Sofi Pettersson-Colling	Sweden	8.90	9.40	18.30	8.43	8.43	16.86	8.26	8.70	16.96	9.36	9.23	18.59	70.71
45	Luciana Reali	Italy	8.83	9.10	17.93	8.36	8.53	16.89	9.00	8.70	17.70	9.20	8.90	18.10	70.62
46	Ginette Durand	France	8.60	9.06	17.66	8.66	9.40	18.06	9.06	7.96	17.02	8.86	8.96	17.82	70.56
47	Alena Reichová	Czechoslovakia	9.06	8.43	17.49	8.66	8.00	16.66	9.06	9.16	18.22	9.10	8.93	18.03	70.40
48	Elisabetta Durelli	Italy	8.86	8.90	17.76	8.46	8.56	17.02	8.66	8.83	17.49	9.36	8.76	18.12	70.39
49	Rayna Grigorova	Bulgaria	9.23	8.80	18.03	9.00	8.96	17.96	8.73	8.73	17.46	8.80	7.93	16.73	70.18
50	Irène Pittelioen	France	8.46	8.53	16.99	8.30	9.40	17.70	9.03	9.06	18.09	8.43	8.96	17.39	70.17
51	Raili Tuominen-Hämäläinen	Finland	9.16	8.76	17.92	9.10	9.10	18.20	7.93	8.60	16.53	8.60	8.83	17.43	70.08
52	Olga Göllner	Romania	8.73	8.83	17.56	9.16	8.96	18.12	8.83	9.03	17.86	8.13	8.40	16.53	70.07
53	Wolfgard Voß	Germany	8.93	8.53	17.46	8.66	8.66	17.32	8.60	8.33	16.93	9.13	9.16	18.29	70.00
54	Inge Sedlmaier	Germany	8.96	8.70	17.66	8.56	8.53	17.09	8.46	8.90	17.36	9.16	8.56	17.72	69.83
55	Renata Bianchi	Italy	8.36	8.96	17.32	8.36	8.50	16.86	8.66	9.00	17.66	9.26	8.66	17.92	69.76
56	Ida Kadlec	Austria	9.16	8.73	17.89	7.86	8.60	16.46	8.53	8.80	17.33	8.93	9.13	18.06	69.74
57	Ingrid Sandahl	Sweden	9.40	8.20	17.60	8.33	8.86	17.19	8.43	8.46	16.89	8.80	9.20	18.00	69.68
58	Ileana Gyarfaș	Romania	8.73	8.83	17.56	8.63	9.03	17.66	8.73	8.40	17.13	8.70	8.56	17.26	69.61
58	Vappu Salonen	Finland	9.10	8.76	17.86	8.60	8.70	17.30	8.30	8.36	16.66	8.96	8.83	17.79	69.61
60	Lydia Zeitlhofer	Germany	9.13	8.86	17.99	8.80	8.93	17.73	8.86	8.86	17.72	7.50	8.63	16.13	69.57
61	Sonja Rožman	Yugoslavia	8.70	8.86	17.56	8.33	9.06	17.39	7.93	8.73	16.66	8.93	8.96	17.89	69.50
62	Lenie Gerrietsen	Netherlands	8.33	8.56	16.89	8.53	9.00	17.53	8.50	8.56	17.06	8.93	9.06	17.99	69.47
63	Arja Lehtinen	Finland	9.03	8.83	17.86	8.50	8.86	17.36	8.26	8.13	16.39	8.86	8.96	17.82	69.43
64	Marian Barone	United States	8.30	8.46	16.76	8.23	8.86	17.09	8.96	8.73	17.69	8.90	8.86	17.76	69.30
65	Hjördis Nordin	Sweden	8.93	8.80	17.73	8.30	8.93	17.23	8.26	8.30	16.56	8.73	9.03	17.76	69.28
65	Ruth Grulkowski	United States	8.96	8.63	17.59	8.56	8.90	17.46	8.90	8.13	17.03	8.90	8.30	17.20	69.28
67	Zofia Kowalczyk	Poland	8.86	8.83	17.69	8.20	9.10	17.30	8.06	8.86	16.92	8.96	8.33	17.29	69.20
68	Olga Munteanu	Romania	8.93	8.73	17.66	8.80	8.56	17.36	8.83	8.93	17.76	8.16	8.06	16.22	69.00
69	Honorata Marcińczak	Poland	8.50	8.50	17.00	8.00	9.03	17.03	8.46	9.00	17.46	8.96	8.40	17.36	68.85
70	Tanja Žutić	Yugoslavia	8.63	8.40	17.03	8.40	8.53	16.93	7.86	8.63	16.49	9.10	8.66	18.03	68.48
71	Gerti Fesl	Austria	8.90	8.60	17.50	8.16	8.80	16.96	8.50	8.73	17.23	8.96	7.80	16.76	68.45
72	Huiberdina Krul-van der Nolk van Gogh	Netherlands	8.03	8.50	16.53	8.13	8.70	16.83	8.00	8.83	16.83	9.13	9.10	18.23	68.42
73	Clara Schroth-Lomady	United States	9.10	8.96	18.06	8.40	6.96	15.36	9.00	8.50	17.50	8.63	8.83	17.46	68.38
74	Anka Drinić	Yugoslavia	8.93	8.63	17.56	7.86	8.64	16.32	8.66	8.40	17.06	8.73	8.93	17.39	68.33
75	Trude Gollner-Kolar	Austria	8.83	8.23	17.06	7.80	8.93	16.73	8.10	8.70	16.80	8.80	8.86	17.66	68.25
76	Barbara Wilk-Ślizowska	Poland	9.16	8.73	17.89	8.10	9.10	17.20	8.56	9.20	17.76	7.33	7.96	15.29	68.14
77	Hedwig Traindl	Austria	9.06	8.53	17.59	8.16	8.86	17.02	7.96	8.26	16.22	8.66	8.53	17.19	68.02
78	Gwynedd Lewis-Lingard	Great Britain	8.70	8.43	17.13	8.40	8.83	17.23	7.66	8.26	15.92	9.13	8.60	17.73	68.01
79	Helga Bîrsan	Romania	8.86	8.30	17.16	8.60	8.66	17.26	7.90	8.36	16.26	9.06	8.26	17.32	68.00
80	Brigitte Kiesler	Germany	9.13	8.30	17.43	6.70	8.30	15.00	8.70	8.56	17.26	9.13	9.16	18.29	67.98
81	Gertrude Winnige-Barosch	Austria	8.86	8.43	17.29	8.26	7.93	16.19	8.30	8.33	16.63	9.10	8.66	17.76	67.87
83	Vanja Blomberg	Sweden	9.03	8.96	17.99	8.36	7.93	16.29	8.13	8.20	16.33	8.23	9.00	17.23	67.84
83	Ruth Topalian	United States	8.33	8.33	16.66	8.13	8.20	16.33	8.60	8.30	16.90	8.96	8.96	17.92	67.81
84	Nada Spasić	Yugoslavia	8.63	8.16	16.79	8.40	8.50	16.90	7.50	8.63	16.13	9.10	8.86	17.96	67.78
85	Eveline Slavici	Romania	8.36	8.66	17.02	8.53	7.33	15.86	8.56	8.53	17.09	9.36	8.40	17.76	67.73
86	Dorota Horzonek-Jokiel	Poland	8.66	8.70	17.36	7.76	9.20	16.96	6.76	9.00	15.76	9.13	8.36	17.49	67.57
87	Alexandra Lemoine	France	8.80	9.16	17.96	8.46	9.23	17.69	5.50	8.36	13.86	9.16	8.76	17.92	67.43
88	Madeleine Jouffroy	France	8.90	8.60	17.50	8.53	6.80	15.33	8.90	8.80	17.70	9.00	7.70	16.70	67.23
89	Pat Hirst	Great Britain	8.43	8.46	16.89	8.40	7.23	15.63	8.30	8.43	16.73	8.93	9.03	17.96	67.21
90	Milica Rožman	Yugoslavia	8.56	8.30	16.86	8.43	9.13	17.56	8.60	8.46	17.06	6.83	8.83	15.66	67.14'
91	Gertrude Gries	Austria	8.36	7.90	16.26	7.93	8.43	16.36	8.83	8.56	17.39	8.40	8.66	17.06	67.07
92	Ada Smolnikar	Yugoslavia	8.63	8.60	17.23	8.50	8.33	16.83	7.53	7.96	15.49	8.73	8.63	17.36	66.91
92	Annie Ros	Netherlands	8.36	8.03	16.39	8.33	8.96	17.29	8.20	8.10	16.30	8.00	8.93	16.93	66.91
94	Tootje Selbach	Netherlands	8.03	7.86	15.89	8.40	8.90	17.30	7.90	8.23	16.13	8.36	9.00	17.36	66.68
95	Liliane Montagne	France	8.73	8.03	16.76	8.40	9.10	17.50	7.90	8.06	15.96	8.73	7.70	16.43	66.65
96	Marija Ivandekić	Yugoslavia	8.53	7.53	16.06	8.30	8.80	17.10	8.33	8.56	16.89	8.40	8.16	16.56	56.61
97	Colette Hué	France	8.90	8.26	17.16	8.40	7.96	16.36	8.40	7.40	15.80	8.86	8.33	17.19	66.51
98	Yordanka Yovkova	Bulgaria	8.60	8.00	16.60	8.86	8.73	17.59	7.96	7.06	15.02	9.13	8.03	17.16	66.37
99	Colette Fanara	France	8.80	8.30	17.10	8.20	7.43	15.63	8.06	8.66	16.72	8.76	8.10	16.86	66.31
100	Nanny Simon	Netherlands	8.50	7.93	16.43	8.06	8.20	16.26	8.20	7.80	16.00	8.90	8.60	17.50	66.19
101	Jeanette Vogelbacher	France	8.40	8.20	16.60	7.83	8.33	16.16	8.83	9.00	17.83	8.00	7.56	15.56	66.15
102	Raili Hoviniemi	Finland	8.53	8.26	16.79	8.23	8.96	17.19	7.80	7.83	15.63	7.90	8.30	16.20	65.81
103	Dorothy Dalton	United States	8.43	8.33	16.76	8.03	7.40	15.43	8.36	8.06	16.42	8.46	8.66	17.06	65.67
103	Cissy Davies	Great Britain	8.03	7.70	15.73	8.46	8.90	17.36	6.63	8.46	15.09	8.86	8.63	17.49	65.67
105	Edeltraud Schramm	Austria	8.80	7.96	16.76	8.06	8.56	16.62	7.86	8.50	16.36	7.36	8.40	15.76	65.50
106	Jo Cox-Ladru	Netherlands	8.20	8.13	16.33	7.96	8.30	16.26	8.10	7.83	15.93	8.03	8.80	16.83	65.35
107	Marie Hoesly	United States	8.70	8.20	16.90	8.40	6.30	14.70	8.66	8.73	17.39	7.73	8.60	16.33	65.32
108	Pirkko Vilppunen	Finland	8.76	8.26	17.02	8.46	8.70	17.16	6.66	7.83	14.49	8.16	8.26	16.42	65.09
109	Dália da Cunha-Sammer	Portugal	8.10	8.43	16.53	7.60	8.90	16.50	6.63	8.06	14.69	8.33	9.03	17.36	65.08
110	Stoyanka Angelova	Bulgaria	8.63	8.00	16.63	8.76	9.03	17.79	8.40	8.70	17.10	5.93	7.40	13.33	64.85
111	Margo Morgan	Great Britain	8.06	7.83	15.89	8.03	8.10	16.13	7.16	7.96	15.12	8.90	8.63	17.53	64.67
112	Margaret Thomas-Neale	Great Britain	7.63	7.83	15.46	8.03	7.96	15.99	8.13	7.80	15.93	8.83	8.43	17.26	64.64
113	Bergljot Sandvik-Johansen	Norway	8.40	8.36	16.76	7.76	8.16	15.92	7.46	7.53	14.99	8.53	8.36	16.89	64.56
114	Grethe Werner	Norway	8.40	8.80	17.20	7.63	6.56	14.19	7.53	7.83	15.36	8.93	8.70	17.63	64.38
115	Irene Hirst	Great Britain	8.06	7.83	15.89	7.93	6.80	14.73	7.93	7.93	15.86	8.93	8.70	17.63	64.11
116	Norveig Karlsen	Norway	8.10	8.40	16.50	6.53	8.53	15.06	7.16	7.53	14.69	8.93	8.83	17.76	64.01
117	Elisabeta Abrudeanu	Romania	7.83	8.50	16.33	8.16	5.83	13.99	8.23	7.86	16.09	9.06	8.26	17.32	63.73
118	Hilde Koop	Germany	8.66	8.30	16.96	4.46	7.36	11.82	8.90	7.66	16.56	9.03	9.03	18.06	63.40
119	Maila Nisula	Finland	8.86	8.36	17.22	8.03	8.83	16.86	6.90	6.56	13.46	7.86	7.90	15.76	63.30
120	Hildegard Grill	Austria	8.70	7.46	16.16	7.90	7.83	15.73	7.23	8.53	15.76	7.86	7.73	15.59	63.24
121	Toetie Selbach	Netherlands	8.36	8.06	16.42	8.16	6.76	14.92	8.13	8.33	16.46	7.36	7.90	15.26	63.06
122	Penka Prisadashka	Bulgaria	9.06	8.50	17.56	8.50	6.63	15.13	8.83	3.33	12.16	9.30	8.76	18.06	62.91
123	Urszula Łukomska	Poland	8.46	8.66	17.12	7.86	4.50	12.36	8.90	8.90	17.80	7.36	8.26	15.62	62.90
124	Maria Laura Amorim	Portugal	8.20	8.03	16.23	7.60	8.60	16.20	7.90	4.60	12.50	8.80	8.56	17.36	62.29
125	Pirkko Pyykönen	Finland	8.73	8.30	17.03	8.46	6.33	14.79	6.13	7.86	13.99	7.76	7.86	15.62	61.43
126	Valerie Mullins	Great Britain	8.06	7.66	15.72	8.00	6.10	14.10	6.46	7.66	14.12	8.83	8.63	17.46	61.40
127	Raija Simola	Finland	8.86	7.90	16.76	8.23	6.33	14.56	6.86	8.23	15.09	8.16	6.73	14.89	61.30
128	Cootje van Kampen-Tonneman	Netherlands	7.80	7.93	15.73	8.20	8.70	16.90	8.20	6.63	14.83	7.26	6.33	13.59	61.05
129	Meta Elste	United States	8.96	8.46	17.42	8.20	8.96	17.16	8.73	8.70	17.43	—	8.66	8.66	60.67
130	Tereza Kočiš	Yugoslavia	8.93	8.83	17.76	8.43	7.80	16.23	8.66	8.40	17.06	0.00	9.10	9.10	60.15
131	Marjorie Raistrick	Great Britain	7.93	6.96	14.89	7.53	8.56	16.09	8.00	3.16	11.16	9.10	8.86	17.96	60.10
132	Teofila Băiașu	Romania	8.30	8.53	16.83	8.56	8.60	17.16	8.70	8.56	17.26	-	8.26	8.26	59.51
133	Natália Silva	Portugal	6.96	7.33	14.29	6.96	7.56	14.52	6.53	7.26	13.79	0.00	7.56	7.56	50.16
134	Doris Kirkman	United States	7.96	—	7.96	8.10	—	8.10	8.40	—	8.40	7.10	—	7.10	31.56
