= Gymnastics at the 1952 Summer Olympics – Women's floor =

Olympic gymnastics event

Women's floor exercise at the Games of the XV Olympiad
- Venue: Messuhalli, Exhibition Hall II
- Date: 22–23 July 1952
- Competitors: 134 from 18 nations
- Winning score: 19.36

Medalists
1st place, gold medalist(s)		Ágnes Keleti	Hungary
2nd place, silver medalist(s)		Maria Gorokhovskaya	Soviet Union
3rd place, bronze medalist(s)		Margit Korondi	Hungary

The women's floor exercise competition at the 1952 Summer Olympics was held at Messuhalli, Exhibition Hall II from 22 to 23 July. It was the first appearance of the event.

== Competition format ==
The gymnastics format continued to use the aggregation format. Each nation entered a team of eight gymnasts or up to three individual gymnasts. All entrants in the gymnastics competitions performed both a compulsory exercise and a voluntary exercise for each apparatus. The four apparatus that would become standard (floor, balance beam, uneven bars, and vault) were all used in the same Games for the first time.

No separate finals were contested.

For each individual exercise, five judges gave scores from 0 to 10 in one-tenth point increments. The top and bottom scores were discarded and the remaining three scores averaged to give the exercise total. Thus, exercise scores ranged from 0 to 10 and apparatus scores from 0 to 20.

The competitor had the option to make a second try only on the compulsory exercise—with the second attempt counting regardless of whether it was better than the first. For voluntary exercises, only one attempt could be made.

== Results ==
Rank	Gymnast	Nation	Compulsory	Voluntary	Total
1st place, gold medalist(s)	Ágnes Keleti	Hungary	9.50	9.86	19.36
2nd place, silver medalist(s)	Maria Gorokhovskaya	Soviet Union	9.50	9.70	19.20
3rd place, bronze medalist(s)	Margit Korondi	Hungary	9.40	9.60	19.00
4	Galina Urbanovich	Soviet Union	9.43	9.56	18.99
4	Erzsébet Gulyás-Köteles	Hungary	9.26	9.73	18.99
6	Galina Minaicheva	Soviet Union	9.36	9.60	18.96
7	Olga Tass	Hungary	9.23	9.66	18.89
8	Galina Shamrai	Soviet Union	9.23	9.63	18.86
9	Edit Perényi-Weckinger	Hungary	9.16	9.66	18.82
10	Nina Bocharova	Soviet Union	9.40	9.30	18.70
11	Pelageya Danilova	Soviet Union	9.23	9.43	18.60
12	Medea Jugeli	Soviet Union	9.30	9.30	18.60
13	Eva Věchtová	Czechoslovakia	9.36	9.23	18.59
13	Mária Kövi-Zalai	Hungary	9.16	9.43	18.59
15	Tsvetanka Stancheva	Bulgaria	9.16	9.20	18.36
16	Karin Lindberg	Sweden	9.23	9.10	18.33
17	Ann-Sofi Pettersson-Colling	Sweden	8.90	9.40	18.30
18	Helena Rakoczy	Poland	9.26	9.03	18.29
19	Andrea Bodó	Hungary	9.16	9.10	18.26
20	Alena Chadimová	Czechoslovakia	9.20	9.03	18.23
20	Gun Röring	Sweden	9.30	8.93	18.23
22	Stefania Świerzy	Poland	9.26	8.90	18.16
23	Stela Perin	Romania	9.00	9.13	18.13
24	Hanna Grages	Germany	9.06	9.03	18.09
24	Miranda Cicognani	Italy	8.83	0.26	18.09
26	Stefania Reindl	Poland	9.06	9.00	18.06
26	Clara Schroth-Lomady	United States	9.10	8.96	18.06
28	Irén Daruházi-Karcsics	Hungary	9.03	9.00	18.03
28	Rayna Grigorova	Bulgaria	9.23	8.80	18.03
29	Ivanka Dolzheva	Bulgaria	9.06	8.96	18.02
31	Lydia Zeitlhofer	Germany	9.13	8.86	17.99
31	Vanja Blomberg	Sweden	9.03	8.96	17.99
33	Věra Vančurová	Czechoslovakia	9.20	8.76	17.96
33	Alexandra Lemoine	France	8.80	9.16	17.96
33	Luciana Reali	Italy	8.83	9.10	17.93
36	Raili Tuominen-Hämäläinen	Finland	9.16	8.76	17.92
37	Evy Berggren	Sweden	8.86	9.03	17.89
37	Göta Pettersson	Sweden	8.86	9.03	17.89
37	Ida Kadlec	Austria	9.16	8.73	17.89
37	Barbara Wilk-Ślizowska	Poland	9.16	8.73	17.89
41	Vappu Salonen	Finland	9.10	8.76	17.86
41	Arja Lehtinen	Finland	9.03	8.83	17.86
43	Jana Rabasová	Czechoslovakia	9.03	8.76	17.79
44	Grazia Bozzo	Italy	8.43	9.33	17.76
44	Elisabetta Durelli	Italy	8.86	8.90	17.76
44	Tereza Kočiš	Yugoslavia	8.93	8.83	17.76
45	Ekaterina Kalinchuk	Soviet Union	8.83	8.90	17.73
47	Irma Walther	Germany	8.80	8.93	17.73
47	Hana Bobková	Czechoslovakia	9.13	8.60	17.73
47	Hjördis Nordin	Sweden	8.93	8.80	17.73
51	Zofia Kowalczyk	Poland	8.86	8.83	17.69
52	Liliana Scaricabarozzi	Italy	8.70	8.96	17.66
52	Ginette Durand	France	8.60	9.06	17.66
52	Inge Sedlmaier	Germany	8.96	8.70	17.66
52	Olga Munteanu	Romania	8.93	8.73	17.66
56	Licia Macchini	Italy	8.90	8.73	17.63
56	Elisabeth Ostermeyer	Germany	9.00	8.63	17.63
58	Ingrid Sandahl	Sweden	9.40	8.20	17.60
59	Ruth Grulkowski	United States	8.96	8.63	17.59
59	Hedwig Traindl	Austria	9.06	8.53	17.59
61	Božena Srncová	Czechoslovakia	9.00	8.56	17.56
61	Olga Göllner	Romania	8.73	8.83	17.56
61	Ileana Gyarfaş	Romania	8.73	8.83	17.56
61	Sonja Rožman	Yugoslavia	8.70	8.86	17.56
61	Anka Drinić	Yugoslavia	8.93	8.63	17.56
61	Penka Prisadashka	Bulgaria	9.06	8.50	17.56
67	Gerti Fesl	Austria	8.90	8.60	17.50
67	Madeleine Jouffroy	France	8.90	8.60	17.50
63	Lidia Pitteri	Italy	8.63	8.86	17.49
69	Alena Reichová	Czechoslovakia	9.06	8.43	17.49
71	Saltirka Spasova-Tarpova	Bulgaria	9.03	8.43	17.46
71	Wolfgard Voß	Germany	8.93	8.53	17.46
73	Vasilka Stancheva	Bulgaria	9.10	8.33	17.43
73	Matylda Šínová	Czechoslovakia	9.03	8.40	17.43
73	Brigitte Kiesler	Germany	9.13	8.30	17.43
76	Meta Elste	United States	8.96	8.46	17.42
77	Dorota Horzonek-Jokiel	Poland	8.66	8.70	17.36
78	Renata Bianchi	Italy	8.36	8.96	17.32
79	Gertrude Winnige-Barosch	Austria	8.86	8.43	17.29
80	Ada Smolnikar	Yugoslavia	8.63	8.60	17.23
81	Maila Nisula	Finland	8.86	8.36	17.22
82	Grethe Werner	Norway	8.40	8.80	17.20
83	Helga Bîrsan	Romania	8.86	8.30	17.16
83	Colette Hué	France	8.90	8.26	17.16
85	Gwynedd Lewis-Lingard	Great Britain	8.70	8.43	17.13
86	Urszula Łukomska	Poland	8.46	8.66	17.12
87	Colette Fanara	France	8.80	8.30	17.10
88	Trude Gollner-Kolar	Austria	8.83	8.23	17.06
89	Tanja Žutić	Yugoslavia	8.63	8.40	17.03
89	Pirkko Pyykönen	Finland	8.73	8.30	17.03
91	Eveline Slavici	Romania	8.36	8.66	17.02
91	Pirkko Vilppunen	Finland	8.76	8.26	17.02
93	Honorata Marcińczak	Poland	8.50	8.50	17.00
94	Irène Pittelioen	France	8.46	8.53	16.99
95	Hilde Koop	Germany	8.66	8.30	16.96
96	Marie Hoesly	United States	8.70	8.20	16.90
97	Lenie Gerrietsen	Netherlands	8.33	8.56	16.89
97	Pat Hirst	Great Britain	8.43	8.46	16.89
99	Milica Rožman	Yugoslavia	8.56	8.30	16.86
100	Teofila Băiașu	Romania	8.30	8.53	16.83
101	Nada Spasić	Yugoslavia	8.63	8.16	16.79
101	Raili Hoviniemi	Finland	8.53	8.26	16.79
103	Marian Barone	United States	8.30	8.46	16.76
103	Liliane Montagne	France	8.73	8.03	16.76
103	Dorothy Dalton	United States	8.43	8.33	16.76
103	Edeltraud Schramm	Austria	8.80	7.96	16.76
103	Bergljot Sandvik-Johansen	Norway	8.40	8.36	16.76
103	Raija Simola	Finland	8.86	7.90	16.76
109	Ruth Topalian	United States	8.33	8.33	16.66
110	Stoyanka Angelova	Bulgaria	8.63	8.00	16.63
111	Yordanka Yovkova	Bulgaria	8.60	8.00	16.60
111	Jeanette Vogelbacher	France	8.40	8.20	16.60
113	Huiberdina Krul-van der Nolk van Gogh	Netherlands	8.03	8.50	16.53
113	Dália da Cunha-Sammer	Portugal	8.10	8.43	16.53
115	Norveig Karlsen	Norway	8.10	8.40	16.50
116	Nanny Simon	Netherlands	8.50	7.93	16.43
117	Toetie Selbach	Netherlands	8.36	8.06	16.42
118	Annie Ros	Netherlands	8.36	8.03	16.39
119	Jo Cox-Ladru	Netherlands	8.20	8.13	16.33
119	Elisabeta Abrudeanu	Romania	7.83	8.50	16.33
121	Gertrude Gries	Austria	8.36	7.90	16.26
122	Maria Laura Amorim	Portugal	8.20	8.03	16.23
123	Hildegard Grill	Austria	8.70	7.46	16.16
124	Marija Ivandekić	Yugoslavia	8.53	7.53	16.06
125	Tootje Selbach	Netherlands	8.03	7.86	15.89
125	Margo Morgan	Great Britain	8.06	7.83	15.89
125	Irene Hirst	Great Britain	8.06	7.83	15.89
128	Cissy Davies	Great Britain	8.03	7.70	15.73
128	Cootje van Kampen-Tonneman	Netherlands	7.80	7.93	15.73
130	Valerie Mullins	Great Britain	8.06	7.66	15.72
131	Margaret Thomas-Neale	Great Britain	7.63	7.83	15.46
132	Marjorie Raistrick	Great Britain	7.93	6.96	14.89
133	Natália Silva	Portugal	6.96	7.33	14.29
134	Doris Kirkman	United States	7.96	—	7.96
