= Gymnastics at the 1952 Summer Olympics – Women's uneven bars =

Olympic gymnastics event

Women's uneven bars at the Games of the XV Olympiad
- Venue: Messuhalli, Exhibition Hall II
- Date: 22–23 July 1952
- Competitors: 134 from 18 nations
- Winning score: 19.40

Medalists
1st place, gold medalist(s)		Margit Korondi	Hungary
2nd place, silver medalist(s)		Maria Gorokhovskaya	Soviet Union
3rd place, bronze medalist(s)		Ágnes Keleti	Hungary

The women's uneven bars competition at the 1952 Summer Olympics was held at Messuhalli, Exhibition Hall II from 22 to 23 July. It was the first appearance of the event, though bars exercises were part of the women's team all-around event in 1936.

== Competition format ==
The gymnastics format continued to use the aggregation format. Each nation entered a team of eight gymnasts or up to three individual gymnasts. All entrants in the gymnastics competitions performed both a compulsory exercise and a voluntary exercise for each apparatus. The four apparatus that would become standard (floor, balance beam, uneven bars, and vault) were all used in the same Games for the first time.

No separate finals were contested.

For each individual exercise, five judges gave scores from 0 to 10 in one-tenth point increments. The top and bottom scores were discarded and the remaining three scores averaged to give the exercise total. Thus, exercise scores ranged from 0 to 10 and apparatus scores from 0 to 20.

The competitor had the option to make a second try only on the compulsory exercise—with the second attempt counting regardless of whether it was better than the first. For voluntary exercises, only one attempt could be made.

== Results ==
Rank	Gymnast	Nation	Compulsory	Voluntary	Total
1st place, gold medalist(s)	Margit Korondi	Hungary	9.70	9.70	19.40
2nd place, silver medalist(s)	Maria Gorokhovskaya	Soviet Union	9.63	9.63	19.26
3rd place, bronze medalist(s)	Ágnes Keleti	Hungary	9.46	9.70	19.16
4	Nina Bocharova	Soviet Union	9.56	9.43	18.99
4	Pelageya Danilova	Soviet Union	9.43	9.56	18.99
6	Edit Perényi-Weckinger	Hungary	9.40	9.56	18.96
7	Galina Shamrai	Soviet Union	9.33	9.60	18.93
8	Galina Minaicheva	Soviet Union	9.36	9.53	18.89
9	Medea Jugeli	Soviet Union	9.23	9.50	18.73
10	Ekaterina Kalinchuk	Soviet Union	9.30	9.36	18.66
11	Erzsébet Gulyás-Köteles	Hungary	9.23	9.40	18.63
12	Galina Urbanovich	Soviet Union	9.16	9.46	18.62
12	Mária Kövi-Zalai	Hungary	9.26	9.36	18.62
14	Irén Daruházi-Karcsics	Hungary	9.06	9.53	18.59
15	Eva Věchtová	Czechoslovakia	9.16	9.36	18.52
16	Andrea Bodó	Hungary	9.33	9.16	18.49
17	Olga Tass	Hungary	9.30	9.10	18.40
18	Tsvetanka Stancheva	Bulgaria	9.03	9.36	18.39
19	Alena Reichová	Czechoslovakia	9.06	9.16	18.22
20	Božena Srncová	Czechoslovakia	8.93	9.20	18.13
21	Jana Rabasová	Czechoslovakia	9.06	9.06	18.12
22	Ivanka Dolzheva	Bulgaria	8.90	9.20	18.10
23	Irène Pittelioen	France	9.03	9.06	18.09
24	Irma Walther	Germany	9.06	9.00	18.06
25	Karin Lindberg	Sweden	9.03	8.96	17.99
26	Saltirka Spasova-Tarpova	Bulgaria	8.76	9.20	17.96
27	Hana Bobková	Czechoslovakia	8.73	9.20	17.93
28	Lidia Pitteri	Italy	9.03	8.86	17.89
29	Olga Göllner	Romania	8.83	9.03	17.86
29	Stefania Reindl	Poland	8.56	9.30	17.86
31	Hanna Grages	Germany	8.90	8.93	17.83
31	Licia Macchini	Italy	9.03	8.80	17.83
31	Jeanette Vogelbacher	France	8.83	9.00	17.83
34	Matylda Šínová	Czechoslovakia	8.46	9.36	17.82
35	Alena Chadimová	Czechoslovakia	8.50	9.30	17.80
35	Urszula Łukomska	Poland	8.90	8.90	17.80
37	Elisabeth Ostermeyer	Germany	8.86	8.93	17.79
38	Olga Munteanu	Romania	8.83	8.93	17.76
38	Barbara Wilk-Ślizowska	Poland	8.56	9.20	17.76
40	Lydia Zeitlhofer	Germany	8.86	8.86	17.72
41	Luciana Reali	Italy	9.00	8.70	17.70
41	Madeleine Jouffroy	France	8.90	8.80	17.70
43	Liliana Scaricabarozzi	Italy	8.96	8.73	17.69
43	Marian Barone	United States	8.96	8.73	17.69
45	Renata Bianchi	Italy	8.66	9.00	17.66
46	Vasilka Stancheva	Bulgaria	8.73	8.90	17.63
46	Grazia Bozzo	Italy	8.90	8.73	17.63
48	Gun Röring	Sweden	8.86	8.66	17.52
49	Clara Schroth-Lomady	United States	9.00	8.50	17.50
50	Elisabetta Durelli	Italy	8.66	8.83	17.49
51	Rayna Grigorova	Bulgaria	8.73	8.73	17.46
51	Honorata Marcińczak	Poland	8.46	9.00	17.46
53	Miranda Cicognani	Italy	9.10	8.33	17.43
53	Meta Elste	United States	8.73	8.70	17.43
55	Göta Pettersson	Sweden	8.86	8.56	17.42
56	Gertrude Gries	Austria	8.83	8.56	17.39
56	Marie Hoesly	United States	8.66	8.73	17.39
58	Stela Perin	Romania	8.33	9.03	17.36
58	Inge Sedlmaier	Germany	8.46	8.90	17.36
60	Ida Kadlec	Austria	8.53	8.80	17.33
61	Věra Vančurová	Czechoslovakia	8.10	9.20	17.30
61	Stefania Świerzy	Poland	8.10	9.20	17.30
63	Evy Berggren	Sweden	8.56	8.70	17.26
63	Teofila Băiașu	Romania	8.70	8.56	17.26
63	Brigitte Kiesler	Germany	8.70	8.56	17.26
66	Gerti Fesl	Austria	8.50	8.73	17.23
67	Ileana Gyarfaş	Romania	8.73	8.40	17.13
68	Stoyanka Angelova	Bulgaria	8.40	8.70	17.10
69	Eveline Slavici	Romania	8.56	8.53	17.09
70	Milica Rožman	Yugoslavia	8.60	8.46	17.06
70	Lenie Gerrietsen	Netherlands	8.50	8.56	17.06
70	Anka Drinić	Yugoslavia	8.66	8.40	17.06
70	Tereza Kočiš	Yugoslavia	8.66	8.40	17.06
74	Ruth Grulkowski	United States	8.90	8.13	17.03
74	Ginette Durand	France	9.06	7.96	17.02
76	Ann-Sofi Pettersson-Colling	Sweden	8.26	8.70	16.96
77	Wolfgard Voß	Germany	8.60	8.33	16.93
78	Zofia Kowalczyk	Poland	8.06	8.86	16.92
79	Ruth Topalian	United States	8.60	8.30	16.90
80	Ingrid Sandahl	Sweden	8.43	8.46	16.89
80	Marija Ivandekić	Yugoslavia	8.33	8.56	16.89
82	Huiberdina Krul-van der Nolk van Gogh	Netherlands	8.00	8.83	16.83
83	Trude Gollner-Kolar	Austria	8.10	8.70	16.80
84	Pat Hirst	Great Britain	8.30	8.43	16.73
85	Colette Fanara	France	8.06	8.66	16.72
86	Sonja Rožman	Yugoslavia	7.93	8.73	16.66
86	Vappu Salonen	Finland	8.30	8.36	16.66
88	Gertrude Winnige-Barosch	Austria	8.30	8.33	16.63
89	Hjördis Nordin	Sweden	8.26	8.30	16.56
89	Hilde Koop	Germany	8.90	7.66	16.56
91	Raili Tuominen-Hämäläinen	Finland	7.93	8.60	16.53
92	Tanja Žutić	Yugoslavia	7.86	8.63	16.49
93	Toetie Selbach	Netherlands	8.13	8.33	16.46
94	Dorothy Dalton	United States	8.36	8.06	16.42
95	Arja Lehtinen	Finland	8.26	8.13	16.39
96	Edeltraud Schramm	Austria	7.86	8.50	16.36
97	Vanja Blomberg	Sweden	8.13	8.20	16.33
98	Annie Ros	Netherlands	8.20	8.10	16.30
99	Helga Bîrsan	Romania	7.90	8.36	16.26
100	Hedwig Traindl	Austria	7.96	8.26	16.22
101	Tootje Selbach	Netherlands	7.90	8.23	16.13
101	Nada Spasić	Yugoslavia	7.50	8.63	16.13
103	Elisabeta Abrudeanu	Romania	8.23	7.86	16.09
104	Helena Rakoczy	Poland	6.60	9.40	16.00
104	Nanny Simon	Netherlands	8.20	7.80	16.00
106	Liliane Montagne	France	7.90	8.06	15.96
107	Jo Cox-Ladru	Netherlands	8.10	7.83	15.93
107	Margaret Thomas-Neale	Great Britain	8.13	7.80	15.93
109	Gwynedd Lewis-Lingard	Great Britain	7.66	8.26	15.92
110	Irene Hirst	Great Britain	7.93	7.93	15.86
111	Colette Hué	France	8.40	7.40	15.80
112	Dorota Horzonek-Jokiel	Poland	6.76	9.00	15.76
112	Hildegard Grill	Austria	7.23	8.53	15.76
114	Raili Hoviniemi	Finland	7.80	7.83	15.63
115	Ada Smolnikar	Yugoslavia	7.53	7.96	15.49
116	Grethe Werner	Norway	7.53	7.83	15.36
117	Margo Morgan	Great Britain	7.16	7.96	15.12
118	Cissy Davies	Great Britain	6.63	8.46	15.09
118	Raija Simola	Finland	6.86	8.23	15.09
120	Yordanka Yovkova	Bulgaria	7.96	7.06	15.02
121	Bergljot Sandvik-Johansen	Norway	7.46	7.53	14.99
122	Cootje van Kampen-Tonneman	Netherlands	8.20	6.63	14.83
123	Dália da Cunha-Sammer	Portugal	6.63	8.06	14.69
123	Norveig Karlsen	Norway	7.16	7.53	14.69
125	Pirkko Vilppunen	Finland	6.66	7.83	14.49
126	Valerie Mullins	Great Britain	6.46	7.66	14.12
127	Pirkko Pyykönen	Finland	6.13	7.86	13.99
128	Alexandra Lemoine	France	5.50	8.36	13.86
129	Natália Silva	Portugal	6.53	7.26	13.79
130	Maila Nisula	Finland	6.90	6.56	13.46
131	Maria Laura Amorim	Portugal	7.90	4.60	12.50
132	Penka Prisadashka	Bulgaria	8.83	3.33	12.16
133	Marjorie Raistrick	Great Britain	8.00	3.16	11.16
134	Doris Kirkman	United States	8.40	—	8.40
