= Gymnastics at the 1952 Summer Olympics – Women's balance beam =

Women's balance beam at the Games of the XV Olympiad
- Venue: Messuhalli, Exhibition Hall II
- Date: 22–23 July 1952
- Competitors: 134 from 18 nations
- Winning score: 19.22

Medalists
1st place, gold medalist(s)		Nina Bocharova	Soviet Union
2nd place, silver medalist(s)		Maria Gorokhovskaya	Soviet Union
3rd place, bronze medalist(s)		Margit Korondi	Hungary

The women's balance beam competition at the 1952 Summer Olympics was held at Messuhalli, Exhibition Hall II from 22 to 23 July, 1952. It was the first appearance of the event, though balance beam exercise were part of the women's team all-around events in 1936 and 1948.

== Competition format ==
The gymnastics format continued to use the aggregation format. Each nation entered a team of eight gymnasts or up to three individual gymnasts. All entrants in the gymnastics competitions performed both a compulsory exercise and a voluntary exercise for each apparatus. The four apparatus that became standard (floor, balance beam, uneven bars, and vault) were all used in the same Games for the first time.

No separate finals were contested.

For each individual exercise, five judges gave scores from 0 to 10 in one-tenth point increments. The top and bottom scores were discarded and the remaining three scores averaged to give the exercise total. Thus, exercise scores ranged from 0 to 10 and apparatus scores from 0 to 20.

The competitor had the option to make a second try only on the compulsory exercise—with the second attempt counting regardless of whether it was better than the first. For voluntary exercises, only one attempt could be made.

== Results ==
Rank	Gymnast	Nation	Compulsory	Voluntary	Total
1st place, gold medalist(s)	Nina Bocharova	Soviet Union	9.46	9.76	19.22
2nd place, silver medalist(s)	Maria Gorokhovskaya	Soviet Union	9.43	9.70	19.13
3rd place, bronze medalist(s)	Margit Korondi	Hungary	9.46	9.56	19.02
4	Ágnes Keleti	Hungary	9.43	9.53	18.96
5	Galina Urbanovich	Soviet Union	9.40	9.53	18.93
6	Olga Tass	Hungary	9.40	9.46	18.86
6	Tsvetanka Stancheva	Bulgaria	9.43	9.43	18.86
8	Galina Shamrai	Soviet Union	9.43	9.36	18.79
9	Pelageya Danilova	Soviet Union	9.26	9.50	18.76
10	Galina Minaicheva	Soviet Union	9.13	9.53	18.66
10	Ivanka Dolzheva	Bulgaria	9.36	9.30	18.66
12	Saltirka Spasova-Tarpova	Bulgaria	9.26	9.33	18.59
13	Eva Věchtová	Czechoslovakia	9.03	9.53	18.56
14	Věra Vančurová	Czechoslovakia	9.00	9.50	18.50
15	Medea Jugeli	Soviet Union	9.13	9.36	18.49
16	Erzsébet Gulyás-Köteles	Hungary	9.06	9.33	18.39
17	Edit Perényi-Weckinger	Hungary	9.06	9.30	18.36
18	Ekaterina Kalinchuk	Soviet Union	8.96	9.36	18.32
19	Vasilka Stancheva	Bulgaria	9.16	9.06	18.22
20	Raili Tuominen-Hämäläinen	Finland	9.10	9.10	18.20
21	Božena Srncová	Czechoslovakia	9.13	9.06	18.19
22	Alena Chadimová	Czechoslovakia	8.83	9.33	18.16
22	Gun Röring	Sweden	8.83	9.33	18.16
24	Olga Göllner	Romania	9.16	8.96	18.12
25	Jana Rabasová	Czechoslovakia	8.93	9.13	18.06
25	Ginette Durand	France	8.66	9.40	18.06
25	Matylda Šínová	Czechoslovakia	8.73	9.36	18.06
28	Irma Walther	Germany	8.80	9.23	18.03
29	Karin Lindberg	Sweden	8.76	9.26	18.02
30	Rayna Grigorova	Bulgaria	9.00	8.96	17.96
31	Stela Perin	Romania	8.80	9.13	17.93
31	Hana Bobková	Czechoslovakia	8.63	9.30	17.93
33	Mária Kövi-Zalai	Hungary	8.60	9.30	17.90
34	Stoyanka Angelova	Bulgaria	8.76	9.03	17.79
35	Stefania Świerzy	Poland	8.43	9.33	17.76
36	Lydia Zeitlhofer	Germany	8.80	8.93	17.73
37	Irène Pittelioen	France	8.30	9.40	17.70
38	Alexandra Lemoine	France	8.46	9.23	17.69
39	Helena Rakoczy	Poland	8.26	9.40	17.66
39	Ileana Gyarfaş	Romania	8.63	9.03	17.66
41	Evy Berggren	Sweden	8.26	9.36	17.62
42	Hanna Grages	Germany	8.46	9.13	17.59
42	Yordanka Yovkova	Bulgaria	8.86	8.73	17.59
44	Milica Rožman	Yugoslavia	8.43	9.13	17.56
45	Lenie Gerrietsen	Netherlands	8.53	9.00	17.53
46	Liliane Montagne	France	8.40	9.10	17.50
47	Lidia Pitteri	Italy	8.46	9.03	17.49
48	Ruth Grulkowski	United States	8.56	8.90	17.46
49	Göta Pettersson	Sweden	8.40	9.03	17.43
50	Miranda Cicognani	Italy	8.56	8.86	17.42
51	Sonja Rožman	Yugoslavia	8.33	9.06	17.39
52	Arja Lehtinen	Finland	8.50	8.86	17.36
52	Olga Munteanu	Romania	8.80	8.56	17.36
52	Cissy Davies	Great Britain	8.46	8.90	17.36
55	Wolfgard Voß	Germany	8.66	8.66	17.32
56	Vappu Salonen	Finland	8.60	8.70	17.30
56	Zofia Kowalczyk	Poland	8.20	9.10	17.30
56	Liliana Scaricabarozzi	Italy	8.60	8.70	17.30
56	Tootje Selbach	Netherlands	8.40	8.90	17.30
60	Grazia Bozzo	Italy	8.46	8.83	17.29
60	Annie Ros	Netherlands	8.33	8.96	17.29
62	Helga Bîrsan	Romania	8.60	8.66	17.26
63	Hjördis Nordin	Sweden	8.30	8.93	17.23
63	Gwynedd Lewis-Lingard	Great Britain	8.40	8.83	17.23
65	Barbara Wilk-Ślizowska	Poland	8.10	9.10	17.20
66	Licia Macchini	Italy	8.23	8.96	17.19
66	Ingrid Sandahl	Sweden	8.33	8.86	17.19
66	Raili Hoviniemi	Finland	8.23	8.96	17.19
69	Meta Elste	United States	8.20	8.96	17.16
69	Pirkko Vilppunen	Finland	8.46	8.70	17.16
69	Teofila Băiașu	Romania	8.56	8.60	17.16
72	Marija Ivandekić	Yugoslavia	8.30	8.80	17.10
73	Inge Sedlmaier	Germany	8.56	8.53	17.09
73	Marian Barone	United States	8.23	8.86	17.09
75	Elisabeth Ostermeyer	Germany	8.36	8.70	17.06
76	Honorata Marcińczak	Poland	8.00	9.03	17.03
77	Elisabetta Durelli	Italy	8.46	8.56	17.02
77	Hedwig Traindl	Austria	8.16	8.86	17.02
79	Gerti Fesl	Austria	8.16	8.80	16.96
79	Dorota Horzonek-Jokiel	Poland	7.76	9.20	16.96
81	Tanja Žutić	Yugoslavia	8.40	8.53	16.93
82	Nada Spasić	Yugoslavia	8.40	8.50	16.90
82	Cootje van Kampen-Tonneman	Netherlands	8.20	8.70	16.90
84	Luciana Reali	Italy	8.36	8.53	16.89
85	Ann-Sofi Pettersson-Colling	Sweden	8.43	8.43	16.86
85	Renata Bianchi	Italy	8.36	8.50	16.86
85	Maila Nisula	Finland	8.03	8.83	16.86
88	Ada Smolnikar	Yugoslavia	8.50	8.33	16.83
88	Huiberdina Krul-van der Nolk van Gogh	Netherlands	8.13	8.70	16.83
90	Trude Gollner-Kolar	Austria	7.80	8.93	16.73
91	Alena Reichová	Czechoslovakia	8.66	8.00	16.66
92	Edeltraud Schramm	Austria	8.06	8.56	16.62
93	Irén Daruházi-Karcsics	Hungary	9.13	7.42	16.56
94	Andrea Bodó	Hungary	9.03	7.50	16.53
94	Stefania Reindl	Poland	7.43	9.10	16.53
96	Dália da Cunha-Sammer	Portugal	7.60	8.90	16.50
97	Ida Kadlec	Austria	7.86	8.60	16.46
98	Colette Hué	France	8.40	7.96	16.36
98	Gertrude Gries	Austria	7.93	8.43	16.36
100	Ruth Topalian	United States	8.13	8.20	16.33
101	Anka Drinić	Yugoslavia	7.86	8.64	16.32
102	Vanja Blomberg	Sweden	8.36	7.93	16.29
103	Nanny Simon	Netherlands	8.06	8.20	16.26
103	Jo Cox-Ladru	Netherlands	7.96	8.30	16.26
105	Tereza Kočiš	Yugoslavia	8.43	7.80	16.23
106	Maria Laura Amorim	Portugal	7.60	8.60	16.20
107	Gertrude Winnige-Barosch	Austria	8.26	7.93	16.19
108	Jeanette Vogelbacher	France	7.83	8.33	16.16
109	Margo Morgan	Great Britain	8.03	8.10	16.13
110	Marjorie Raistrick	Great Britain	7.53	8.56	16.09
111	Margaret Thomas-Neale	Great Britain	8.03	7.96	15.99
112	Bergljot Sandvik-Johansen	Norway	7.76	8.16	15.92
113	Eveline Slavici	Romania	8.53	7.33	15.86
114	Hildegard Grill	Austria	7.90	7.83	15.73
115	Colette Fanara	France	8.20	7.43	15.63
115	Pat Hirst	Great Britain	8.40	7.23	15.63
117	Dorothy Dalton	United States	8.03	7.40	15.43
118	Clara Schroth-Lomady	United States	8.40	6.96	15.36
119	Madeleine Jouffroy	France	8.53	6.80	15.33
120	Penka Prisadashka	Bulgaria	8.50	6.63	15.13
121	Norveig Karlsen	Norway	6.53	8.53	15.06
122	Brigitte Kiesler	Germany	6.70	8.30	15.00
123	Toetie Selbach	Netherlands	8.16	6.76	14.92
124	Pirkko Pyykönen	Finland	8.46	6.33	14.79
125	Irene Hirst	Great Britain	7.93	6.80	14.73
126	Marie Hoesly	United States	8.40	6.30	14.70
127	Raija Simola	Finland	8.23	6.33	14.56
128	Natália Silva	Portugal	6.96	7.56	14.52
129	Grethe Werner	Norway	7.63	6.56	14.19
130	Valerie Mullins	Great Britain	8.00	6.10	14.10
131	Elisabeta Abrudeanu	Romania	8.16	5.83	13.99
132	Urszula Łukomska	Poland	7.86	4.50	12.36
133	Hilde Koop	Germany	4.46	7.36	11.82
134	Doris Kirkman	United States	8.10	—	8.10
