= Gymnastics at the 1952 Summer Olympics – Women's team portable apparatus =

Olympic gymnastics event

Women's team portable apparatus at the Games of the XV Olympiad
- Venue: Messuhalli, Exhibition Hall II
- Date: 24 July 1952
- Competitors: 128 from 16 nations
- Winning score: 74.20

Medalists
| 1st place, gold medalist(s) | | Karin Lindberg; Ann-Sofi Pettersson; Evy Berggren; Gun Roring; Göta Pettersson; Ingrid Sandahl; Hjördis Nordin; Vanja Blomberg | Sweden |
| 2nd place, silver medalist(s) | | Maria Gorokhovskaya; Nina Bocharova; Galina Minaicheva; Galina Urbanovich; Pelageva Danilova; Galina Shamrai; Medea Jugeli; Ekaterina Kalinchuk | Soviet Union |
| 3rd place, bronze medalist(s) | | Margit Korondi; Ágnes Keleti; Edit Perényi-Weckinger; Olga Tass; Erzsébet Gulyás-Köteles; Mária Kövi-Zalai; Andrea Bodó; Irén Daruházi-Karcsics | Hungary |

The women's team portable apparatus competition at the 1952 Summer Olympics was held at Messuhalli, Exhibition Hall II on 24 July. It was the first appearance of the event, which would only be held again in 1956.

== Competition format ==
The gymnastics format continued to use the aggregation format. Each nation entered a team of eight gymnasts. The team apparatus event was one of the components of the team all-around event. No separate finals were contested. For the team portable apparatus, eight judges gave scores between 0 and 10, the top two and bottom two scores were discarded, and the remaining four scores were summed and multiplied by 2. Thus, team apparatus scores ranged from 0 to 80.

== Results ==
| Rank | Nation | Gymnasts | Score |
|---|---|---|---|
| 1st place, gold medalist(s) | Sweden | Karin Lindberg | 74.20 |
| 1st place, gold medalist(s) | Sweden | Gun Röring | 74.20 |
| 1st place, gold medalist(s) | Sweden | Evy Berggren | 74.20 |
| 1st place, gold medalist(s) | Sweden | Göta Pettersson | 74.20 |
| 1st place, gold medalist(s) | Sweden | Ann-Sofi Pettersson-Colling | 74.20 |
| 1st place, gold medalist(s) | Sweden | Ingrid Sandahl | 74.20 |
| 1st place, gold medalist(s) | Sweden | Hjördis Nordin | 74.20 |
| 1st place, gold medalist(s) | Sweden | Vanja Blomberg | 74.20 |
| 2nd place, silver medalist(s) | Soviet Union | Maria Gorokhovskaya | 73.00 |
| 2nd place, silver medalist(s) | Soviet Union | Nina Bocharova | 73.00 |
| 2nd place, silver medalist(s) | Soviet Union | Galina Minaicheva | 73.00 |
| 2nd place, silver medalist(s) | Soviet Union | Galina Urbanovich | 73.00 |
| 2nd place, silver medalist(s) | Soviet Union | Pelageya Danilova | 73.00 |
| 2nd place, silver medalist(s) | Soviet Union | Galina Shamrai | 73.00 |
| 2nd place, silver medalist(s) | Soviet Union | Medea Jugeli | 73.00 |
| 2nd place, silver medalist(s) | Soviet Union | Ekaterina Kalinchuk | 73.00 |
| 3rd place, bronze medalist(s) | Hungary | Margit Korondi | 71.60 |
| 3rd place, bronze medalist(s) | Hungary | Ágnes Keleti | 71.60 |
| 3rd place, bronze medalist(s) | Hungary | Edit Perényi-Weckinger | 71.60 |
| 3rd place, bronze medalist(s) | Hungary | Olga Tass | 71.60 |
| 3rd place, bronze medalist(s) | Hungary | Erzsébet Gulyás-Köteles | 71.60 |
| 3rd place, bronze medalist(s) | Hungary | Mária Kövi-Zalai | 71.60 |
| 3rd place, bronze medalist(s) | Hungary | Andrea Bodó | 71.60 |
| 3rd place, bronze medalist(s) | Hungary | Irén Daruházi-Karcsics | 71.60 |
| 4 | Germany | Irma Walther | 71.20 |
| 4 | Germany | Hanna Grages | 71.20 |
| 4 | Germany | Elisabeth Ostermeyer | 71.20 |
| 4 | Germany | Wolfgard Voß | 71.20 |
| 4 | Germany | Inge Sedlmaier | 71.20 |
| 4 | Germany | Lydia Zeitlhofer | 71.20 |
| 4 | Germany | Brigitte Kiesler | 71.20 |
| 4 | Germany | Hilde Koop | 71.20 |
| 5 | Finland | Raili Tuominen-Hämäläinen | 70.60 |
| 5 | Finland | Vappu Salonen | 70.60 |
| 5 | Finland | Arja Lehtinen | 70.60 |
| 5 | Finland | Raili Hoviniemi | 70.60 |
| 5 | Finland | Pirkko Vilppunen | 70.60 |
| 5 | Finland | Maila Nisula | 70.60 |
| 5 | Finland | Pirkko Pyykönen | 70.60 |
| 5 | Finland | Raija Simola | 70.60 |
| 6 | Czechoslovakia | Eva Věchtová | 70.00 |
| 6 | Czechoslovakia | Alena Chadimová | 70.00 |
| 6 | Czechoslovakia | Jana Rabasová | 70.00 |
| 6 | Czechoslovakia | Božena Srncová | 70.00 |
| 6 | Czechoslovakia | Hana Bobková | 70.00 |
| 6 | Czechoslovakia | Matylda Šínová | 70.00 |
| 6 | Czechoslovakia | Věra Vančurová | 70.00 |
| 6 | Czechoslovakia | Alena Reichová | 70.00 |
| 6 | Netherlands | Lenie Gerrietsen | 70.00 |
| 6 | Netherlands | Huiberdina Krul-van der Nolk van Gogh | 70.00 |
| 6 | Netherlands | Annie Ros | 70.00 |
| 6 | Netherlands | Tootje Selbach | 70.00 |
| 6 | Netherlands | Nanny Simon | 70.00 |
| 6 | Netherlands | Jo Cox-Ladru | 70.00 |
| 6 | Netherlands | Toetie Selbach | 70.00 |
| 6 | Netherlands | Cootje van Kampen-Tonneman | 70.00 |
| 8 | Yugoslavia | Sonja Rožman | 69.20 |
| 8 | Yugoslavia | Tanja Žutić | 69.20 |
| 8 | Yugoslavia | Anka Drinić | 69.20 |
| 8 | Yugoslavia | Nada Spasić | 69.20 |
| 8 | Yugoslavia | Milica Rožman | 69.20 |
| 8 | Yugoslavia | Ada Smolnikar | 69.20 |
| 8 | Yugoslavia | Marija Ivandekić | 69.20 |
| 8 | Yugoslavia | Tereza Kočiš | 69.20 |
| 9 | Austria | Ida Kadlec | 68.40 |
| 9 | Austria | Gerti Fesl | 68.40 |
| 9 | Austria | Trude Gollner-Kolar | 68.40 |
| 9 | Austria | Hedwig Traindl | 68.40 |
| 9 | Austria | Gertrude Winnige-Barosch | 68.40 |
| 9 | Austria | Gertrude Gries | 68.40 |
| 9 | Austria | Edeltraud Schramm | 68.40 |
| 9 | Austria | Hildegard Grill | 68.40 |
| 10 | Italy | Lidia Pitteri | 68.20 |
| 10 | Italy | Miranda Cicognani | 68.20 |
| 10 | Italy | Licia Macchini | 68.20 |
| 10 | Italy | Liliana Scaricabarozzi | 68.20 |
| 10 | Italy | Grazia Bozzo | 68.20 |
| 10 | Italy | Luciana Reali | 68.20 |
| 10 | Italy | Elisabetta Durelli | 68.20 |
| 10 | Italy | Renata Bianchi | 68.20 |
| 11 | France | Ginette Durand | 67.80 |
| 11 | France | Irène Pittelioen | 67.80 |
| 11 | France | Alexandra Lemoine | 67.80 |
| 11 | France | Madeleine Jouffroy | 67.80 |
| 11 | France | Liliane Montagne | 67.80 |
| 11 | France | Colette Hué | 67.80 |
| 11 | France | Colette Fanara | 67.80 |
| 11 | France | Jeanette Vogelbacher | 67.80 |
| 12 | Bulgaria | Tsvetanka Stancheva | 66.80 |
| 12 | Bulgaria | Ivanka Dolzheva | 66.80 |
| 12 | Bulgaria | Saltirka Spasova-Tarpova | 66.80 |
| 12 | Bulgaria | Vasilka Stancheva | 66.80 |
| 12 | Bulgaria | Rayna Grigorova | 66.80 |
| 12 | Bulgaria | Yordanka Yovkova | 66.80 |
| 12 | Bulgaria | Stoyanka Angelova | 66.80 |
| 12 | Bulgaria | Penka Prisadashka | 66.80 |
| 12 | Romania | Stela Perin | 66.80 |
| 12 | Romania | Olga Göllner | 66.80 |
| 12 | Romania | Ileana Gyarfaş | 66.80 |
| 12 | Romania | Olga Munteanu | 66.80 |
| 12 | Romania | Helga Bîrsan | 66.80 |
| 12 | Romania | Eveline Slavici | 66.80 |
| 12 | Romania | Elisabeta Abrudeanu | 66.80 |
| 12 | Romania | Teofila Băiașu | 66.80 |
| 14 | Poland | Stefania Świerzy | 64.20 |
| 14 | Poland | Stefania Reindl | 64.20 |
| 14 | Poland | Helena Rakoczy | 64.20 |
| 14 | Poland | Zofia Kowalczyk | 64.20 |
| 14 | Poland | Honorata Marcińczak | 64.20 |
| 14 | Poland | Barbara Wilk-Ślizowska | 64.20 |
| 14 | Poland | Dorota Horzonek-Jokiel | 64.20 |
| 14 | Poland | Urszula Łukomska | 64.20 |
| 15 | Great Britain | Gwynedd Lewis-Lingard | 63.00 |
| 15 | Great Britain | Pat Hirst | 63.00 |
| 15 | Great Britain | Cissy Davies | 63.00 |
| 15 | Great Britain | Margo Morgan | 63.00 |
| 15 | Great Britain | Margaret Thomas-Neale | 63.00 |
| 15 | Great Britain | Irene Hirst | 63.00 |
| 15 | Great Britain | Valerie Mullins | 63.00 |
| 15 | Great Britain | Marjorie Raistrick | 63.00 |
| 16 | United States | Marian Barone | 61.60 |
| 16 | United States | Ruth Grulkowski | 61.60 |
| 16 | United States | Clara Schroth-Lomady | 61.60 |
| 16 | United States | Ruth Topalian | 61.60 |
| 16 | United States | Dorothy Dalton | 61.60 |
| 16 | United States | Marie Hoesly | 61.60 |
| 16 | United States | Meta Elste | 61.60 |
| 16 | United States | Doris Kirkman | 61.60 |
