= Gymnastics at the 1952 Summer Olympics – Women's artistic team all-around =

Women's artistic team all-around at the Games of the XV Olympiad
- Venue: Messuhalli, Exhibition Hall II
- Date: 22–24 July 1952
- Competitors: 128 from 16 nations
- Winning score: 527.03

Medalists
| 1st place, gold medalist(s) | | Nina Bocharova; Pelageya Danilova; Maria Gorokhovskaya; Ekaterina Kalinchuk; Galina Minaicheva; Galina Shamrai; Galina Urbanovich; Medea Jugeli | Soviet Union |
| 2nd place, silver medalist(s) | | Andrea Bodó; Irén Daruházi-Karcsics; Erzsébet Gulyás-Köteles; Ágnes Keleti; Margit Korondi; Edit Perényi-Weckinger; Olga Tass; Mária Kövi-Zalai | Hungary |
| 3rd place, bronze medalist(s) | | Hana Bobková; Alena Chadimová; Jana Rabasová; Alena Reichová; Matylda Šínová; Božena Srncová; Věra Vančurová; Eva Věchtová | Czechoslovakia |

The women's artistic team all-around competition at the 1952 Summer Olympics was held at Messuhalli, Exhibition Hall II on 22–24 July. It was the fourth appearance of the event.

== Competition format ==
The gymnastics format continued to use the aggregation format. Each nation entered a team of eight gymnasts. All entrants in the gymnastics competitions performed both a compulsory exercise and a voluntary exercise for each apparatus. The four apparatus that would become standard (floor, balance beam, uneven bars, and vault) were all used in the same Games for the first time. The team score consisted of the best six individual all-around scores plus the team portable apparatus score.

No separate finals were contested.

For each individual exercise, five judges gave scores from 0 to 10 in one-tenth point increments. The top and bottom scores were discarded and the remaining three scores averaged to give the exercise total. For the team portable apparatus, eight judges gave scores between 0 and 10, the top two and bottom two scores were discarded, and the remaining four scores were summed and multiplied by 2. Thus, exercise scores ranged from 0 to 10, apparatus scores from 0 to 20, individual totals from 0 to 80, team apparatus scores from 0 to 80, and team all-around scores from 0 to 540.

For the vault, each competitor had two tries for each of the compulsory and voluntary vaults with the better score to count. For the other three apparatus exercises, the competitor had the option to make a second try only on the compulsory exercise—with the second attempt counting regardless of whether it was better than the first. For both compulsory and voluntary floor exercises, and voluntary exercises in the non-floor, non-vault apparatuses, only one attempt could be made.

== Results ==
| Rank | Nation | Gymnasts | Exercise results | | | | | | | | | | | | Ind. total | Team portable apparatus | Team total |
| Rank | Nation | Gymnasts | Floor (gymnastics) | | | Balance beam | | | Parallel bars | | | Vault (gymnastics) | | | Ind. total | Team portable apparatus | Team total |
| Rank | Nation | Gymnasts | C | V | T | C | V | T | C | V | T | C | V | T | Ind. total | Team portable apparatus | Team total |
|---|---|---|---|---|---|---|---|---|---|---|---|---|---|---|---|---|---|
| 1st place, gold medalist(s) | Soviet Union | Maria Gorokhovskaya | 9.50 | 9.70 | 19.20 | 9.43 | 9.70 | 19.13 | 9.63 | 9.63 | 19.26 | 9.63 | 9.56 | 19.19 | 76.78 | 73.00 | 527.03 |
| 1st place, gold medalist(s) | Soviet Union | Nina Bocharova | 9.40 | 9.30 | 18.70 | 9.46 | 9.76 | 19.22 | 9.56 | 9.43 | 18.99 | 9.80 | 9.23 | 19.03 | 75.94 | 73.00 | 527.03 |
| 1st place, gold medalist(s) | Soviet Union | Galina Minaicheva | 9.36 | 9.60 | 18.96 | 9.13 | 9.53 | 18.66 | 9.36 | 9.53 | 18.89 | 9.73 | 9.43 | 19.16 | 75.67 | 73.00 | 527.03 |
| 1st place, gold medalist(s) | Soviet Union | Galina Urbanovich | 9.43 | 9.56 | 18.99 | 9.40 | 9.53 | 18.93 | 9.16 | 9.46 | 18.62 | 9.70 | 9.40 | 19.10 | 75.64 | 73.00 | 527.03 |
| 1st place, gold medalist(s) | Soviet Union | Pelageya Danilova | 9.23 | 9.43 | 18.60 | 9.26 | 9.50 | 18.76 | 9.43 | 9.56 | 18.99 | 9.46 | 9.16 | 18.62 | 75.03 | 73.00 | 527.03 |
| 1st place, gold medalist(s) | Soviet Union | Galina Shamrai | 9.23 | 9.63 | 18.86 | 9.43 | 9.36 | 18.79 | 9.33 | 9.60 | 18.93 | 9.03 | 9.36 | 18.39 | 74.97 | 73.00 | 527.03 |
| 1st place, gold medalist(s) | Soviet Union | Medea Jugeli | 9.30 | 9.30 | 18.60 | 9.13 | 9.36 | 18.49 | 9.23 | 9.50 | 18.73 | 9.73 | 9.40 | 19.13 | ~~74.95~~ | 73.00 | 527.03 |
| 1st place, gold medalist(s) | Soviet Union | Ekaterina Kalinchuk | 8.83 | 8.90 | 17.73 | 8.96 | 9.36 | 18.32 | 9.30 | 9.36 | 18.66 | 9.70 | 9.50 | 19.20 | ~~73.91~~ | 73.00 | 527.03 |
| 1st place, gold medalist(s) | Soviet Union | Total | | | | | | | | | | | | | 454.03 | 73.00 | 527.03 |
| 2nd place, silver medalist(s) | Hungary | Margit Korondi | 9.40 | 9.60 | 19.00 | 9.46 | 9.56 | 19.02 | 9.70 | 9.70 | 19.40 | 9.10 | 9.30 | 18.40 | 75.82 | 71.60 | 520.96 |
| 2nd place, silver medalist(s) | Hungary | Ágnes Keleti | 9.50 | 9.86 | 19.36 | 9.43 | 9.53 | 18.96 | 9.46 | 9.70 | 19.16 | 8.90 | 9.20 | 18.10 | 75.58 | 71.60 | 520.96 |
| 2nd place, silver medalist(s) | Hungary | Edit Perényi-Weckinger | 9.16 | 9.66 | 18.82 | 9.06 | 9.30 | 18.36 | 9.40 | 9.56 | 18.96 | 9.33 | 9.30 | 18.63 | 74.77 | 71.60 | 520.96 |
| 2nd place, silver medalist(s) | Hungary | Olga Tass | 9.23 | 9.66 | 18.89 | 9.40 | 9.46 | 18.86 | 9.30 | 9.10 | 18.40 | 9.26 | 9.30 | 18.56 | 74.71 | 71.60 | 520.96 |
| 2nd place, silver medalist(s) | Hungary | Erzsébet Gulyás-Köteles | 9.26 | 9.73 | 18.99 | 9.06 | 9.33 | 18.39 | 9.23 | 9.40 | 18.63 | 9.30 | 9.30 | 18.60 | 74.61 | 71.60 | 520.96 |
| 2nd place, silver medalist(s) | Hungary | Mária Kövi-Zalai | 9.16 | 9.43 | 18.59 | 8.60 | 9.30 | 17.90 | 9.26 | 9.36 | 18.62 | 9.46 | 9.30 | 18.76 | 73.87 | 71.60 | 520.96 |
| 2nd place, silver medalist(s) | Hungary | Andrea Bodó | 9.16 | 9.10 | 18.26 | 9.03 | 7.50 | 16.53 | 9.33 | 9.16 | 18.49 | 9.23 | 9.16 | 18.39 | ~~71.67~~ | 71.60 | 520.96 |
| 2nd place, silver medalist(s) | Hungary | Irén Daruházi-Karcsics | 9.03 | 9.00 | 18.03 | 9.13 | 7.42 | 16.56 | 9.06 | 9.53 | 18.59 | 8.66 | 9.03 | 17.69 | ~~70.87~~ | 71.60 | 520.96 |
| 2nd place, silver medalist(s) | Hungary | Total | | | | | | | | | | | | | 449.36 | 71.60 | 520.96 |
| 3rd place, bronze medalist(s) | Czechoslovakia | Eva Věchtová | 9.36 | 9.23 | 18.59 | 9.03 | 9.53 | 18.56 | 9.16 | 9.36 | 18.52 | 9.00 | 9.20 | 18.20 | 73.87 | 70.00 | 503.32 |
| 3rd place, bronze medalist(s) | Czechoslovakia | Alena Chadimová | 9.20 | 9.03 | 18.23 | 8.83 | 9.33 | 18.16 | 8.50 | 9.30 | 17.80 | 9.23 | 8.83 | 18.06 | 72.25 | 70.00 | 503.32 |
| 3rd place, bronze medalist(s) | Czechoslovakia | Jana Rabasová | 9.03 | 8.76 | 17.79 | 8.93 | 9.13 | 18.06 | 9.06 | 9.06 | 18.12 | 9.10 | 9.06 | 18.16 | 72.13 | 70.00 | 503.32 |
| 3rd place, bronze medalist(s) | Czechoslovakia | Božena Srncová | 9.00 | 8.56 | 17.56 | 9.13 | 9.06 | 18.19 | 8.93 | 9.20 | 18.13 | 9.00 | 9.20 | 18.20 | 72.08 | 70.00 | 503.32 |
| 3rd place, bronze medalist(s) | Czechoslovakia | Hana Bobková | 9.13 | 8.60 | 17.73 | 8.63 | 9.30 | 17.93 | 8.73 | 9.20 | 17.93 | 8.93 | 9.00 | 17.93 | 71.52 | 70.00 | 503.32 |
| 3rd place, bronze medalist(s) | Czechoslovakia | Matylda Šínová | 9.03 | 8.40 | 17.43 | 8.73 | 9.36 | 18.06 | 8.46 | 9.36 | 17.82 | 9.40 | 8.73 | 18.13 | 71.47 | 70.00 | 503.32 |
| 3rd place, bronze medalist(s) | Czechoslovakia | Věra Vančurová | 9.20 | 8.76 | 17.96 | 9.00 | 9.50 | 18.50 | 8.10 | 9.20 | 17.30 | 9.16 | 8.46 | 17.62 | ~~71.38~~ | 70.00 | 503.32 |
| 3rd place, bronze medalist(s) | Czechoslovakia | Alena Reichová | 9.06 | 8.43 | 17.49 | 8.66 | 8.00 | 16.66 | 9.06 | 9.16 | 18.22 | 9.10 | 8.93 | 18.03 | ~~70.40~~ | 70.00 | 503.32 |
| 3rd place, bronze medalist(s) | Czechoslovakia | Total | | | | | | | | | | | | | 433.32 | 70.00 | 503.32 |
| 4 | Sweden | Karin Lindberg | 9.23 | 9.10 | 18.33 | 8.76 | 9.26 | 18.02 | 9.03 | 8.96 | 17.99 | 9.36 | 9.43 | 18.79 | 73.13 | 74.20 | 501.83 |
| 4 | Sweden | Gun Röring | 9.30 | 8.93 | 18.23 | 8.83 | 9.33 | 18.16 | 8.86 | 8.66 | 17.52 | 9.13 | 9.03 | 18.16 | 72.07 | 74.20 | 501.83 |
| 4 | Sweden | Evy Berggren | 8.86 | 9.03 | 17.89 | 8.26 | 9.36 | 17.62 | 8.56 | 8.70 | 17.26 | 9.10 | 9.20 | 18.30 | 71.07 | 74.20 | 501.83 |
| 4 | Sweden | Göta Pettersson | 8.86 | 9.03 | 17.89 | 8.40 | 9.03 | 17.43 | 8.86 | 8.56 | 17.42 | 9.03 | 9.20 | 18.23 | 70.97 | 74.20 | 501.83 |
| 4 | Sweden | Ann-Sofi Pettersson-Colling | 8.90 | 9.40 | 18.30 | 8.43 | 8.43 | 16.86 | 8.26 | 8.70 | 16.96 | 9.36 | 9.23 | 18.59 | 70.71 | 74.20 | 501.83 |
| 4 | Sweden | Ingrid Sandahl | 9.40 | 8.20 | 17.60 | 8.33 | 8.86 | 17.19 | 8.43 | 8.46 | 16.89 | 8.80 | 9.20 | 18.00 | 69.68 | 74.20 | 501.83 |
| 4 | Sweden | Hjördis Nordin | 8.93 | 8.80 | 17.73 | 8.30 | 8.93 | 17.23 | 8.26 | 8.30 | 16.56 | 8.73 | 9.03 | 17.76 | ~~69.28~~ | 74.20 | 501.83 |
| 4 | Sweden | Vanja Blomberg | 9.03 | 8.96 | 17.99 | 8.36 | 7.93 | 16.29 | 8.13 | 8.20 | 16.33 | 8.23 | 9.00 | 17.23 | ~~67.84~~ | 74.20 | 501.83 |
| 4 | Sweden | Total | | | | | | | | | | | | | 427.63 | 74.20 | 501.83 |
| 5 | Germany | Irma Walther | 8.80 | 8.93 | 17.73 | 8.80 | 9.23 | 18.03 | 9.06 | 9.00 | 18.06 | 9.20 | 8.93 | 18.13 | 71.95 | 71.20 | 495.20 |
| 5 | Germany | Hanna Grages | 9.06 | 9.03 | 18.09 | 8.46 | 9.13 | 17.59 | 8.90 | 8.93 | 17.83 | 9.23 | 9.03 | 18.26 | 71.77 | 71.20 | 495.20 |
| 5 | Germany | Elisabeth Ostermeyer | 9.00 | 8.63 | 17.63 | 8.36 | 8.70 | 17.06 | 8.86 | 8.93 | 17.79 | 9.30 | 9.13 | 18.43 | 70.91 | 71.20 | 495.20 |
| 5 | Germany | Wolfgard Voß | 8.93 | 8.53 | 17.46 | 8.66 | 8.66 | 17.32 | 8.60 | 8.33 | 16.93 | 9.13 | 9.16 | 18.29 | 70.00 | 71.20 | 495.20 |
| 5 | Germany | Inge Sedlmaier | 8.96 | 8.70 | 17.66 | 8.56 | 8.53 | 17.09 | 8.46 | 8.90 | 17.36 | 9.16 | 8.56 | 17.72 | 69.83 | 71.20 | 495.20 |
| 5 | Germany | Lydia Zeitlhofer | 9.13 | 8.86 | 17.99 | 8.80 | 8.93 | 17.73 | 8.86 | 8.86 | 17.72 | 7.50 | 8.63 | 16.13 | 69.57 | 71.20 | 495.20 |
| 5 | Germany | Brigitte Kiesler | 9.13 | 8.30 | 17.43 | 6.70 | 8.30 | 15.00 | 8.70 | 8.56 | 17.26 | 9.13 | 9.16 | 18.29 | ~~67.98~~ | 71.20 | 495.20 |
| 5 | Germany | Hilde Koop | 8.66 | 8.30 | 16.96 | 4.46 | 7.36 | 11.82 | 8.90 | 7.66 | 16.56 | 9.03 | 9.03 | 18.06 | ~~63.40~~ | 71.20 | 495.20 |
| 5 | Germany | Total | | | | | | | | | | | | | 424.03 | 71.20 | 495.20 |
| 6 | Italy | Lidia Pitteri | 8.63 | 8.86 | 17.49 | 8.46 | 9.03 | 17.49 | 9.03 | 8.86 | 17.89 | 9.50 | 9.23 | 18.73 | 71.60 | 68.20 | '494.74 |
| 6 | Italy | Miranda Cicognani | 8.83 | 0.26 | 18.09 | 8.56 | 8.86 | 17.42 | 9.10 | 8.33 | 17.43 | 9.43 | 9.13 | 18.56 | 71.50 | 68.20 | '494.74 |
| 6 | Italy | Licia Macchini | 8.90 | 8.73 | 17.63 | 8.23 | 8.96 | 17.19 | 9.03 | 8.80 | 17.83 | 9.43 | 9.16 | 18.59 | 71.24 | 68.20 | '494.74 |
| 6 | Italy | Liliana Scaricabarozzi | 8.70 | 8.96 | 17.66 | 8.60 | 8.70 | 17.30 | 8.96 | 8.73 | 17.69 | 9.30 | 8.86 | 18.16 | 70.81 | 68.20 | '494.74 |
| 6 | Italy | Grazia Bozzo | 8.43 | 9.33 | 17.76 | 8.46 | 8.83 | 17.29 | 8.90 | 8.73 | 17.63 | 9.03 | 9.06 | 18.09 | 70.77 | 68.20 | '494.74 |
| 6 | Italy | Luciana Reali | 8.83 | 9.10 | 17.93 | 8.36 | 8.53 | 16.89 | 9.00 | 8.70 | 17.70 | 9.20 | 8.90 | 18.10 | 70.62 | 68.20 | '494.74 |
| 6 | Italy | Elisabetta Durelli | 8.86 | 8.90 | 17.76 | 8.46 | 8.56 | 17.02 | 8.66 | 8.83 | 17.49 | 9.36 | 8.76 | 18.12 | ~~70.39~~ | 68.20 | '494.74 |
| 6 | Italy | Renata Bianchi | 8.36 | 8.96 | 17.32 | 8.36 | 8.50 | 16.86 | 8.66 | 9.00 | 17.66 | 9.26 | 8.66 | 17.92 | ~~69.76~~ | 68.20 | '494.74 |
| 6 | Italy | Total | | | | | | | | | | | | | 426.54 | 68.20 | '494.74 |
| 7 | Bulgaria | Tsvetanka Stancheva | 9.16 | 9.20 | 18.36 | 9.43 | 9.43 | 18.86 | 9.03 | 9.36 | 18.39 | 9.16 | 8.90 | 18.06 | 73.67 | 66.80 | 493.77 |
| 7 | Bulgaria | Ivanka Dolzheva | 9.06 | 8.96 | 18.02 | 9.36 | 9.30 | 18.66 | 8.90 | 9.20 | 18.10 | 9.20 | 8.83 | 18.03 | 72.81 | 66.80 | 493.77 |
| 7 | Bulgaria | Saltirka Spasova-Tarpova | 9.03 | 8.43 | 17.46 | 9.26 | 9.33 | 18.59 | 8.76 | 9.20 | 17.96 | 9.33 | 8.96 | 18.29 | 72.30 | 66.80 | 493.77 |
| 7 | Bulgaria | Vasilka Stancheva | 9.10 | 8.33 | 17.43 | 9.16 | 9.06 | 18.22 | 8.73 | 8.90 | 17.63 | 9.40 | 8.96 | 18.36 | 71.64 | 66.80 | 493.77 |
| 7 | Bulgaria | Rayna Grigorova | 9.23 | 8.80 | 18.03 | 9.00 | 8.96 | 17.96 | 8.73 | 8.73 | 17.46 | 8.80 | 7.93 | 16.73 | 70.18 | 66.80 | 493.77 |
| 7 | Bulgaria | Yordanka Yovkova | 8.60 | 8.00 | 16.60 | 8.86 | 8.73 | 17.59 | 7.96 | 7.06 | 15.02 | 9.13 | 8.03 | 17.16 | 66.37 | 66.80 | 493.77 |
| 7 | Bulgaria | Stoyanka Angelova | 8.63 | 8.00 | 16.63 | 8.76 | 9.03 | 17.79 | 8.40 | 8.70 | 17.10 | 5.93 | 7.40 | 13.33 | ~~64.85~~ | 66.80 | 493.77 |
| 7 | Bulgaria | Penka Prisadashka | 9.06 | 8.50 | 17.56 | 8.50 | 6.63 | 15.13 | 8.83 | 3.33 | 12.16 | 9.30 | 8.76 | 18.06 | ~~62.91~~ | 66.80 | 493.77 |
| 7 | Bulgaria | Total | | | | | | | | | | | | | 426.97 | 66.80 | 493.77 |
| 8 | Poland | Stefania Świerzy | 9.26 | 8.90 | 18.16 | 8.43 | 9.33 | 17.76 | 8.10 | 9.20 | 17.30 | 9.53 | 8.93 | 18.46 | 71.68 | 64.20 | 483.72 |
| 8 | Poland | Stefania Reindl | 9.06 | 9.00 | 18.06 | 7.43 | 9.10 | 16.53 | 8.56 | 9.30 | 17.86 | 9.46 | 9.00 | 18.46 | 70.91 | 64.20 | 483.72 |
| 8 | Poland | Helena Rakoczy | 9.26 | 9.03 | 18.29 | 8.26 | 9.40 | 17.66 | 6.60 | 9.40 | 16.00 | 9.53 | 9.26 | 18.79 | 70.74 | 64.20 | 483.72 |
| 8 | Poland | Zofia Kowalczyk | 8.86 | 8.83 | 17.69 | 8.20 | 9.10 | 17.30 | 8.06 | 8.86 | 16.92 | 8.96 | 8.33 | 17.29 | 69.20 | 64.20 | 483.72 |
| 8 | Poland | Honorata Marcińczak | 8.50 | 8.50 | 17.00 | 8.00 | 9.03 | 17.03 | 8.46 | 9.00 | 17.46 | 8.96 | 8.40 | 17.36 | 68.85 | 64.20 | 483.72 |
| 8 | Poland | Barbara Wilk-Ślizowska | 9.16 | 8.73 | 17.89 | 8.10 | 9.10 | 17.20 | 8.56 | 9.20 | 17.76 | 7.33 | 7.96 | 15.29 | 68.14 | 64.20 | 483.72 |
| 8 | Poland | Dorota Horzonek-Jokiel | 8.66 | 8.70 | 17.36 | 7.76 | 9.20 | 16.96 | 6.76 | 9.00 | 15.76 | 9.13 | 8.36 | 17.49 | ~~67.57~~ | 64.20 | 483.72 |
| 8 | Poland | Urszula Łukomska | 8.46 | 8.66 | 17.12 | 7.86 | 4.50 | 12.36 | 8.90 | 8.90 | 17.80 | 7.36 | 8.26 | 15.62 | ~~62.90~~ | 64.20 | 483.72 |
| 8 | Poland | Total | | | | | | | | | | | | | 419.52 | 64.20 | 483.72 |
| 9 | Romania | Stela Perin | 9.00 | 9.13 | 18.13 | 8.80 | 9.13 | 17.93 | 8.33 | 9.03 | 17.36 | 9.43 | 9.00 | 18.43 | 71.85 | 66.80 | 482.06 |
| 9 | Romania | Olga Göllner | 8.73 | 8.83 | 17.56 | 9.16 | 8.96 | 18.12 | 8.83 | 9.03 | 17.86 | 8.13 | 8.40 | 16.53 | 70.07 | 66.80 | 482.06 |
| 9 | Romania | Ileana Gyarfaş | 8.73 | 8.83 | 17.56 | 8.63 | 9.03 | 17.66 | 8.73 | 8.40 | 17.13 | 8.70 | 8.56 | 17.26 | 69.61 | 66.80 | 482.06 |
| 9 | Romania | Olga Munteanu | 8.93 | 8.73 | 17.66 | 8.80 | 8.56 | 17.36 | 8.83 | 8.93 | 17.76 | 8.16 | 8.06 | 16.22 | 69.00 | 66.80 | 482.06 |
| 9 | Romania | Helga Bîrsan | 8.86 | 8.30 | 17.16 | 8.60 | 8.66 | 17.26 | 7.90 | 8.36 | 16.26 | 9.06 | 8.26 | 17.32 | 68.00 | 66.80 | 482.06 |
| 9 | Romania | Eveline Slavici | 8.36 | 8.66 | 17.02 | 8.53 | 7.33 | 15.86 | 8.56 | 8.53 | 17.09 | 9.36 | 8.40 | 17.76 | 67.73 | 66.80 | 482.06 |
| 9 | Romania | Elisabeta Abrudeanu | 7.83 | 8.50 | 16.33 | 8.16 | 5.83 | 13.99 | 8.23 | 7.86 | 16.09 | 9.06 | 8.26 | 17.32 | ~~63.73~~ | 66.80 | 482.06 |
| 9 | Romania | Teofila Băiașu | 8.30 | 8.53 | 16.83 | 8.56 | 8.60 | 17.16 | 8.70 | 8.56 | 17.26 | - | 8.26 | 8.26 | ~~59.51~~ | 66.80 | 482.06 |
| 9 | Romania | Total | | | | | | | | | | | | | 416.26 | 66.80 | 482.06 |
| 10 | Austria | Ida Kadlec | 9.16 | 8.73 | 17.89 | 7.86 | 8.60 | 16.46 | 8.53 | 8.80 | 17.33 | 8.93 | 9.13 | 18.06 | 69.74 | 68.40 | 477.80 |
| 10 | Austria | Gerti Fesl | 8.90 | 8.60 | 17.50 | 8.16 | 8.80 | 16.96 | 8.50 | 8.73 | 17.23 | 8.96 | 7.80 | 16.76 | 68.45 | 68.40 | 477.80 |
| 10 | Austria | Trude Gollner-Kolar | 8.83 | 8.23 | 17.06 | 7.80 | 8.93 | 16.73 | 8.10 | 8.70 | 16.80 | 8.80 | 8.86 | 17.66 | 68.25 | 68.40 | 477.80 |
| 10 | Austria | Hedwig Traindl | 9.06 | 8.53 | 17.59 | 8.16 | 8.86 | 17.02 | 7.96 | 8.26 | 16.22 | 8.66 | 8.53 | 17.19 | 68.02 | 68.40 | 477.80 |
| 10 | Austria | Gertrude Winnige-Barosch | 8.86 | 8.43 | 17.29 | 8.26 | 7.93 | 16.19 | 8.30 | 8.33 | 16.63 | 9.10 | 8.66 | 17.76 | 67.87 | 68.40 | 477.80 |
| 10 | Austria | Gertrude Gries | 8.36 | 7.90 | 16.26 | 7.93 | 8.43 | 16.36 | 8.83 | 8.56 | 17.39 | 8.40 | 8.66 | 17.06 | 67.07 | 68.40 | 477.80 |
| 10 | Austria | Edeltraud Schramm | 8.80 | 7.96 | 16.76 | 8.06 | 8.56 | 16.62 | 7.86 | 8.50 | 16.36 | 7.36 | 8.40 | 15.76 | ~~65.50~~ | 68.40 | 477.80 |
| 10 | Austria | Hildegard Grill | 8.70 | 7.46 | 16.16 | 7.90 | 7.83 | 15.73 | 7.23 | 8.53 | 15.76 | 7.86 | 7.73 | 15.59 | ~~63.24~~ | 68.40 | 477.80 |
| 10 | Austria | Total | | | | | | | | | | | | | 409.40 | 68.40 | 477.80 |
| 11 | Yugoslavia | Sonja Rožman | 8.70 | 8.86 | 17.56 | 8.33 | 9.06 | 17.39 | 7.93 | 8.73 | 16.66 | 8.93 | 8.96 | 17.89 | 69.50 | 69.20 | 477.34 |
| 11 | Yugoslavia | Tanja Žutić | 8.63 | 8.40 | 17.03 | 8.40 | 8.53 | 16.93 | 7.86 | 8.63 | 16.49 | 9.10 | 8.66 | 18.03 | 68.48 | 69.20 | 477.34 |
| 11 | Yugoslavia | Anka Drinić | 8.93 | 8.63 | 17.56 | 7.86 | 8.64 | 16.32 | 8.66 | 8.40 | 17.06 | 8.73 | 8.93 | 17.39 | 68.33 | 69.20 | 477.34 |
| 11 | Yugoslavia | Nada Spasić | 8.63 | 8.16 | 16.79 | 8.40 | 8.50 | 16.90 | 7.50 | 8.63 | 16.13 | 9.10 | 8.86 | 17.96 | 67.78 | 69.20 | 477.34 |
| 11 | Yugoslavia | Milica Rožman | 8.56 | 8.30 | 16.86 | 8.43 | 9.13 | 17.56 | 8.60 | 8.46 | 17.06 | 6.83 | 8.83 | 15.66 | 67.14 | 69.20 | 477.34 |
| 11 | Yugoslavia | Ada Smolnikar | 8.63 | 8.60 | 17.23 | 8.50 | 8.33 | 16.83 | 7.53 | 7.96 | 15.49 | 8.73 | 8.63 | 17.36 | 66.91 | 69.20 | 477.34 |
| 11 | Yugoslavia | Marija Ivandekić | 8.53 | 7.53 | 16.06 | 8.30 | 8.80 | 17.10 | 8.33 | 8.56 | 16.89 | 8.40 | 8.16 | 16.56 | ~~56.61~~ | 69.20 | 477.34 |
| 11 | Yugoslavia | Tereza Kočiš | 8.93 | 8.83 | 17.76 | 8.43 | 7.80 | 16.23 | 8.66 | 8.40 | 17.06 | 0.00 | 9.10 | 9.10 | ~~60.15~~ | 69.20 | 477.34 |
| 11 | Yugoslavia | Total | | | | | | | | | | | | | 408.14 | 69.20 | 477.34 |
| 12 | France | Ginette Durand | 8.60 | 9.06 | 17.66 | 8.66 | 9.40 | 18.06 | 9.06 | 7.96 | 17.02 | 8.86 | 8.96 | 17.82 | 70.56 | 67.80 | 476.35 |
| 12 | France | Irène Pittelioen | 8.46 | 8.53 | 16.99 | 8.30 | 9.40 | 17.70 | 9.03 | 9.06 | 18.09 | 8.43 | 8.96 | 17.39 | 70.17 | 67.80 | 476.35 |
| 12 | France | Alexandra Lemoine | 8.80 | 9.16 | 17.96 | 8.46 | 9.23 | 17.69 | 5.50 | 8.36 | 13.86 | 9.16 | 8.76 | 17.92 | 67.43 | 67.80 | 476.35 |
| 12 | France | Madeleine Jouffroy | 8.90 | 8.60 | 17.50 | 8.53 | 6.80 | 15.33 | 8.90 | 8.80 | 17.70 | 9.00 | 7.70 | 16.70 | 67.23 | 67.80 | 476.35 |
| 12 | France | Liliane Montagne | 8.73 | 8.03 | 16.76 | 8.40 | 9.10 | 17.50 | 7.90 | 8.06 | 15.96 | 8.73 | 7.70 | 16.43 | 66.65 | 67.80 | 476.35 |
| 12 | France | Colette Hué | 8.90 | 8.26 | 17.16 | 8.40 | 7.96 | 16.36 | 8.40 | 7.40 | 15.80 | 8.86 | 8.33 | 17.19 | 66.51 | 67.80 | 476.35 |
| 12 | France | Colette Fanara | 8.80 | 8.30 | 17.10 | 8.20 | 7.43 | 15.63 | 8.06 | 8.66 | 16.72 | 8.76 | 8.10 | 16.86 | ~~66.31~~ | 67.80 | 476.35 |
| 12 | France | Jeanette Vogelbacher | 8.40 | 8.20 | 16.60 | 7.83 | 8.33 | 16.16 | 8.83 | 9.00 | 17.83 | 8.00 | 7.56 | 15.56 | ~~66.15~~ | 67.80 | 476.35 |
| 12 | France | Total | | | | | | | | | | | | | 408.55 | 67.80 | 476.35 |
| 13 | Finland | Raili Tuominen-Hämäläinen | 9.16 | 8.76 | 17.92 | 9.10 | 9.10 | 18.20 | 7.93 | 8.60 | 16.53 | 8.60 | 8.83 | 17.43 | 70.08 | 70.60 | 473.92 |
| 13 | Finland | Vappu Salonen | 9.10 | 8.76 | 17.86 | 8.60 | 8.70 | 17.30 | 8.30 | 8.36 | 16.66 | 8.96 | 8.83 | 17.79 | 69.61 | 70.60 | 473.92 |
| 13 | Finland | Arja Lehtinen | 9.03 | 8.83 | 17.86 | 8.50 | 8.86 | 17.36 | 8.26 | 8.13 | 16.39 | 8.86 | 8.96 | 17.82 | 69.43 | 70.60 | 473.92 |
| 13 | Finland | Raili Hoviniemi | 8.53 | 8.26 | 16.79 | 8.23 | 8.96 | 17.19 | 7.80 | 7.83 | 15.63 | 7.90 | 8.30 | 16.20 | 65.81 | 70.60 | 473.92 |
| 13 | Finland | Pirkko Vilppunen | 8.76 | 8.26 | 17.02 | 8.46 | 8.70 | 17.16 | 6.66 | 7.83 | 14.49 | 8.16 | 8.26 | 16.42 | 65.09 | 70.60 | 473.92 |
| 13 | Finland | Maila Nisula | 8.86 | 8.36 | 17.22 | 8.03 | 8.83 | 16.86 | 6.90 | 6.56 | 13.46 | 7.86 | 7.90 | 15.76 | 63.30 | 70.60 | 473.92 |
| 13 | Finland | Pirkko Pyykönen | 8.73 | 8.30 | 17.03 | 8.46 | 6.33 | 14.79 | 6.13 | 7.86 | 13.99 | 7.76 | 7.86 | 15.62 | ~~61.43~~ | 70.60 | 473.92 |
| 13 | Finland | Raija Simola | 8.86 | 7.90 | 16.76 | 8.23 | 6.33 | 14.56 | 6.86 | 8.23 | 15.09 | 8.16 | 6.73 | 14.89 | ~~61.30~~ | 70.60 | 473.92 |
| 13 | Finland | Total | | | | | | | | | | | | | 403.32 | 70.60 | 473.92 |
| 14 | Netherlands | Lenie Gerrietsen | 8.33 | 8.56 | 16.89 | 8.53 | 9.00 | 17.53 | 8.50 | 8.56 | 17.06 | 8.93 | 9.06 | 17.99 | 69.47 | 70.00 | 473.02 |
| 14 | Netherlands | Huiberdina Krul-van der Nolk van Gogh | 8.03 | 8.50 | 16.53 | 8.13 | 8.70 | 16.83 | 8.00 | 8.83 | 16.83 | 9.13 | 9.10 | 18.23 | 68.42 | 70.00 | 473.02 |
| 14 | Netherlands | Annie Ros | 8.36 | 8.03 | 16.39 | 8.33 | 8.96 | 17.29 | 8.20 | 8.10 | 16.30 | 8.00 | 8.93 | 16.93 | 66.91 | 70.00 | 473.02 |
| 14 | Netherlands | Tootje Selbach | 8.03 | 7.86 | 15.89 | 8.40 | 8.90 | 17.30 | 7.90 | 8.23 | 16.13 | 8.36 | 9.00 | 17.36 | 66.68 | 70.00 | 473.02 |
| 14 | Netherlands | Nanny Simon | 8.50 | 7.93 | 16.43 | 8.06 | 8.20 | 16.26 | 8.20 | 7.80 | 16.00 | 8.90 | 8.60 | 17.50 | 66.19 | 70.00 | 473.02 |
| 14 | Netherlands | Jo Cox-Ladru | 8.20 | 8.13 | 16.33 | 7.96 | 8.30 | 16.26 | 8.10 | 7.83 | 15.93 | 8.03 | 8.80 | 16.83 | 65.35 | 70.00 | 473.02 |
| 14 | Netherlands | Toetie Selbach | 8.36 | 8.06 | 16.42 | 8.16 | 6.76 | 14.92 | 8.13 | 8.33 | 16.46 | 7.36 | 7.90 | 15.26 | ~~63.06~~ | 70.00 | 473.02 |
| 14 | Netherlands | Cootje van Kampen-Tonneman | 7.80 | 7.93 | 15.73 | 8.20 | 8.70 | 16.90 | 8.20 | 6.63 | 14.83 | 7.26 | 6.33 | 13.59 | ~~61.05~~ | 70.00 | 473.02 |
| 14 | Netherlands | Total | | | | | | | | | | | | | 403.02 | 70.00 | 473.02 |
| 15 | United States | Marian Barone | 8.30 | 8.46 | 16.76 | 8.23 | 8.86 | 17.09 | 8.96 | 8.73 | 17.69 | 8.90 | 8.86 | 17.76 | 69.30 | 61.60 | 467.36 |
| 15 | United States | Ruth Grulkowski | 8.96 | 8.63 | 17.59 | 8.56 | 8.90 | 17.46 | 8.90 | 8.13 | 17.03 | 8.90 | 8.30 | 17.20 | 69.28 | 61.60 | 467.36 |
| 15 | United States | Clara Schroth-Lomady | 9.10 | 8.96 | 18.06 | 8.40 | 6.96 | 15.36 | 9.00 | 8.50 | 17.50 | 8.63 | 8.83 | 17.46 | 68.38 | 61.60 | 467.36 |
| 15 | United States | Ruth Topalian | 8.33 | 8.33 | 16.66 | 8.13 | 8.20 | 16.33 | 8.60 | 8.30 | 16.90 | 8.96 | 8.96 | 17.92 | 67.81 | 61.60 | 467.36 |
| 15 | United States | Dorothy Dalton | 8.43 | 8.33 | 16.76 | 8.03 | 7.40 | 15.43 | 8.36 | 8.06 | 16.42 | 8.46 | 8.66 | 17.06 | 65.67 | 61.60 | 467.36 |
| 15 | United States | Marie Hoesly | 8.70 | 8.20 | 16.90 | 8.40 | 6.30 | 14.70 | 8.66 | 8.73 | 17.39 | 7.73 | 8.60 | 16.33 | 65.32 | 61.60 | 467.36 |
| 15 | United States | Meta Elste | 8.96 | 8.46 | 17.42 | 8.20 | 8.96 | 17.16 | 8.73 | 8.70 | 17.43 | — | 8.66 | 8.66 | ~~60.67~~ | 61.60 | 467.36 |
| 15 | United States | Doris Kirkman | 7.96 | — | 7.96 | 8.10 | — | 8.10 | 8.40 | — | 8.40 | 7.10 | — | 7.10 | ~~31.56~~ | 61.60 | 467.36 |
| 15 | United States | Total | | | | | | | | | | | | | 405.76 | 61.60 | 467.36 |
| 16 | Great Britain | Gwynedd Lewis-Lingard | 8.70 | 8.43 | 17.13 | 8.40 | 8.83 | 17.23 | 7.66 | 8.26 | 15.92 | 9.13 | 8.60 | 17.73 | 68.01 | 63.00 | 457.31 |
| 16 | Great Britain | Pat Hirst | 8.43 | 8.46 | 16.89 | 8.40 | 7.23 | 15.63 | 8.30 | 8.43 | 16.73 | 8.93 | 9.03 | 17.96 | 67.21 | 63.00 | 457.31 |
| 16 | Great Britain | Cissy Davies | 8.03 | 7.70 | 15.73 | 8.46 | 8.90 | 17.36 | 6.63 | 8.46 | 15.09 | 8.86 | 8.63 | 17.49 | 65.67 | 63.00 | 457.31 |
| 16 | Great Britain | Margo Morgan | 8.06 | 7.83 | 15.89 | 8.03 | 8.10 | 16.13 | 7.16 | 7.96 | 15.12 | 8.90 | 8.63 | 17.53 | 64.67 | 63.00 | 457.31 |
| 16 | Great Britain | Margaret Thomas-Neale | 7.63 | 7.83 | 15.46 | 8.03 | 7.96 | 15.99 | 8.13 | 7.80 | 15.93 | 8.83 | 8.43 | 17.26 | 64.64 | 63.00 | 457.31 |
| 16 | Great Britain | Irene Hirst | 8.06 | 7.83 | 15.89 | 7.93 | 6.80 | 14.73 | 7.93 | 7.93 | 15.86 | 8.93 | 8.70 | 17.63 | 64.11 | 63.00 | 457.31 |
| 16 | Great Britain | Valerie Mullins | 8.06 | 7.66 | 15.72 | 8.00 | 6.10 | 14.10 | 6.46 | 7.66 | 14.12 | 8.83 | 8.63 | 17.46 | ~~61.40~~ | 63.00 | 457.31 |
| 16 | Great Britain | Marjorie Raistrick | 7.93 | 6.96 | 14.89 | 7.53 | 8.56 | 16.09 | 8.00 | 3.16 | 11.16 | 9.10 | 8.86 | 17.96 | ~~60.10~~ | 63.00 | 457.31 |
| 16 | Great Britain | Total | | | | | | | | | | | | | 394.31 | 63.00 | 457.31 |
