= Hungary at the 1952 Summer Olympics =

- IOC code: HUN
- NOC: Hungarian Olympic Committee

in Helsinki, Finland July 19-August 3, 1952
- Competitors: 189 (162 men and 27 women) in 15 sports
- Flag bearer: Imre Németh
- Medals Ranked 3rd: Gold 16 Silver 10 Bronze 16 Total 42

Summer Olympics appearances (overview)
- 1896; 1900; 1904; 1908; 1912; 1920; 1924; 1928; 1932; 1936; 1948; 1952; 1956; 1960; 1964; 1968; 1972; 1976; 1980; 1984; 1988; 1992; 1996; 2000; 2004; 2008; 2012; 2016; 2020; 2024

Other related appearances
- 1906 Intercalated Games

Hungary competed at the 1952 Summer Olympics in Helsinki, Finland. 189 competitors, 162 men and 27 women, took part in 107 events in 15 sports.

== Medalists ==
Hungary finished in third position in the final medal rankings, behind only the United States and Soviet Union.

Medal	Name	Sport	Event	Date
Gold	Ágnes Keleti	Gymnastics	Women's floor	23 July
Gold	Margit Korondi	Gymnastics	Women's uneven bars	23 July
Gold	József Csermák	Athletics	Men's hammer throw	24 July
Gold	Gábor Benedek; István Szondy; Aladár Kovácsi	Modern pentathlon	Men's team	25 July
Gold	Imre Hódos	Wrestling	Men's Greco-Roman bantamweight	27 July
Gold	Miklós Szilvásy	Wrestling	Men's Greco-Roman welterweight	27 July
Gold	Károly Takács	Shooting	Men's 25 metre rapid fire pistol	28 July
Gold	Katalin Szőke	Swimming	Women's 100 metre freestyle	28 July
Gold	Éva Székely	Swimming	Women's 200 metre breaststroke	29 July
Gold	Aladár Gerevich; Tibor Berczelly; Rudolf Kárpáti; Pál Kovács; László Rajcsányi; Bertalan Papp	Fencing	Men's team sabre	30 July
Gold	Pál Kovács	Fencing	Men's sabre	1 August
Gold	Ilona Novák; Judit Temes; Éva Novák-Gerard; Katalin Szőke; Mária Littomeritzky	Swimming	Women's 4 × 100 metre freestyle relay	1 August
Gold	László Papp	Boxing	Men's light middleweight	2 August
Gold	Valéria Gyenge	Swimming	Women's 400 metre freestyle	2 August
Gold	Hungary men's national water polo team: László Jeney; György Vízvári; Dezső Gyarmati; Kálmán Markovits; Antal Bolvári; István Szívós; György Kárpáti; Károly Szittya; Róbert Antal; Dezső Fábián; István Hasznos; Dezső Lemhényi; Miklós Martin	Water polo	Men's tournament	2 August
Gold	Hungary national football team: Gyula Grosics; Jenő Buzánszky; Gyula Lóránt; Mihály Lantos; József Bozsik; József Zakariás; Nándor Hidegkuti; Sándor Kocsis; Péter Palotás; Ferenc Puskás; Zoltán Czibor; László Budai; Lajos Csordás; Jenő Dalnoki; Imre Kovács	Football	Men's tournament	2 August
Silver	Margit Korondi; Ágnes Keleti; Edit Perényi-Weckinger; Olga Tass; Erzsébet Gulyás-Köteles; Mária Zalai-Kövi; Andrea Molnár-Bodó; Irén Daruházi-Karcsics	Gymnastics	Women's artistic team all-around	24 July
Silver	Gábor Benedek	Modern pentathlon	Men's individual	25 July
Silver	Ilona Elek-Schacherer	Fencing	Women's foil	27 July
Silver	Imre Polyák	Wrestling	Men's Greco-Roman featherweight	27 July
Silver	Gábor Novák	Canoeing	Men's C-1 10000 metres	27 July
Silver	Szilárd Kun	Shooting	Men's 25 metre rapid fire pistol	28 July
Silver	János Parti	Canoeing	Men's C-1 1000 metres	28 July
Silver	Éva Novák-Gerard	Swimming	Women's 200 metre breaststroke	29 July
Silver	Aladár Gerevich	Fencing	Men's sabre	1 August
Silver	Éva Novák-Gerard	Swimming	Women's 400 metre freestyle	2 August
Bronze	Antal Róka	Athletics	Men's 50 kilometres walk	21 July
Bronze	Ödön Földessy	Athletics	Men's long jump	21 July
Bronze	Endre Tilli; Aladár Gerevich; Endre Palócz; Lajos Maszlay; Tibor Berczelly; József Sákovics	Fencing	Men's team foil	22 July
Bronze	Margit Korondi	Gymnastics	Women's floor	23 July
Bronze	Margit Korondi	Gymnastics	Women's balance beam	23 July
Bronze	Ágnes Keleti	Gymnastics	Women's uneven bars	23 July
Bronze	Margit Korondi	Gymnastics	Women's artistic individual all-around	23 July
Bronze	Imre Németh	Athletics	Men's hammer throw	24 July
Bronze	Margit Korondi; Ágnes Keleti; Edit Perényi-Weckinger; Olga Tass; Erzsébet Gulyás-Köteles; Mária Zalai-Kövi; Andrea Molnár-Bodó; Irén Daruházi-Karcsics	Gymnastics	Women's team portable apparatus	24 July
Bronze	Ambrus Balogh	Shooting	Men's 50 metre pistol	25 July
Bronze	István Szondy	Modern pentathlon	Men's individual	25 July
Bronze	György Gurics	Wrestling	Men's freestyle middleweight	27 July
Bronze	László Zarándi; Géza Varasdi; György Csányi; Béla Goldoványi	Athletics	Men's 4 × 100 metres relay	27 July
Bronze	Ferenc Varga; József Gurovits	Canoeing	Men's K-2 10000 metres	27 July
Bronze	Judit Temes	Swimming	Women's 100 metre freestyle	28 July
Bronze	Tibor Berczelly	Fencing	Men's sabre	1 August

Default sort order: Medal, Date, Name

Medals by sport
Sport	1st place, gold medalist(s)	2nd place, silver medalist(s)	3rd place, bronze medalist(s)	Total
Swimming	4	2	1	7
Fencing	2	2	2	6
Gymnastics	2	1	5	8
Wrestling	2	1	1	4
Modern pentathlon	1	1	1	3
Shooting	1	1	1	3
Athletics	1	0	4	5
Boxing	1	0	0	1
Football	1	0	0	1
Water polo	1	0	0	1
Canoeing	0	2	1	3
Total	16	10	16	42

Medals by gender
Gender	1st place, gold medalist(s)	2nd place, silver medalist(s)	3rd place, bronze medalist(s)	Total
Male	10	6	10	23
Female	6	4	6	4
Total	16	10	16	42

=== Multiple medalists ===
The following competitors won multiple medals at the 1952 Olympic Games.

Name	Medal	Sport	Event
Pál Kovács	Gold; Gold	Fencing	Men's team sabre Men's sabre
Katalin Szőke	Gold; Gold	Swimming	Women's 100 m freestyle Women's 4×100 m freestyle relay
Éva Novák-Gerard	Gold; Silver; Silver	Swimming	Women's 4×100 m freestyle relay Women's 200 m breaststroke Women's 400 m freestyle
Margit Korondi	Gold; Silver; Bronze; Bronze; Bronze; Bronze	Gymnastics	Women's uneven bars Women's artistic team all-around Women's floor Women's balance beam Women's artistic individual all-around Women's team portable apparatus
Ágnes Keleti	Gold; Silver; Bronze; Bronze	Gymnastics	Women's floor Women's artistic team all-around Women's uneven bars Women's team portable apparatus
Aladár Gerevich	Gold; Silver; Bronze	Fencing	Men's team sabre Men's sabre Men's team foil
Gábor Benedek	Gold; Silver	Modern pentathlon	Men's team Men's individual
Tibor Berczelly	Gold; Bronze; Bronze	Fencing	Men's team sabre Men's sabre Men's team foil
István Szondy	Gold; Bronze	Modern pentathlon	Men's team Men's individual
Judit Temes	Gold; Bronze	Swimming	Women's 4×100 m freestyle relay Women's 100 m freestyle
Edit Perényi-Weckinger	Silver; Bronze	Gymnastics	Women's artistic team all-around Women's team portable apparatus
Olga Tass	Silver; Bronze	Gymnastics	Women's artistic team all-around Women's team portable apparatus
Erzsébet Gulyás-Köteles	Silver; Bronze	Gymnastics	Women's artistic team all-around Women's team portable apparatus
Mária Zalai-Kövi	Silver; Bronze	Gymnastics	Women's artistic team all-around Women's team portable apparatus
Andrea Molnár-Bodó	Silver; Bronze	Gymnastics	Women's artistic team all-around Women's team portable apparatus
Irén Daruházi-Karcsics	Silver; Bronze	Gymnastics	Women's artistic team all-around Women's team portable apparatus

== Basketball ==
Men's Team Competition

- Qualification Round (Group B)

- Defeated Greece (75-38)
- Lost to Philippines (35-48)
- Defeated Greece (47-44)

- Main Round (Group A)

- Lost to United States (48-66)
- Lost to Uruguay (56-70)
- Lost to Czechoslovakia (39-63) → did not advance, 15th place

- Team Roster

- László Bánhegyi
- Pál Bogár
- György Bokor
- Tibor Cselkó
- Tibor Czinkán
- János Greminger
- László Hódy
- Tibor Mezőfi
- Péter Papp
- János Simon
- Gyula Telegdy
- Tibor Zsíros

== Boxing ==
Men's Flyweight:

- Kornél Molnár

1. First Round – Lost to William Michael Toweel of South Africa (0 - 3)

Men's Featherweight:

- János Erdei

1. First Round – Defeated Georges Malézanoff of Bulgaria (2 - 1)
2. Second Round – Defeated Kurt Schirra of Saarland (3 - 0)
3. Third Round – Lost to Jan Zachara of Czechoslovakia (1 - 2)

Men's Lightweight:

- István Juhász

1. First Round – Defeated Luis Albino Acuña of Uruguay (3 - 0)
2. Second Round – Defeated Clayton Orten Kenny of Canada (2 - 1)
3. Third Round – Lost to Aureliano Bolognesi of Italy (1 - 2)

Light-welterweight

- Béla Farkas

1. First Round – Lost to Pavle Šovljanski of Yugoslavia (0 - 3)

Men's Welterweight:

- Pál Budai

1. First Round – Lost to Günther Heidemann of Germany (1 - 2)

Men's Light-Middleweight:

- László Papp → Gold Medal

1. First Round – Defeated Ellsworth Webb of United States (KO 2R)
2. Second Round – Defeated Charles Chase of Canada (KO 2R)
3. Third Round – Defeated Petar Stankoff Spassoff of Bulgaria (3 - 0)
4. Semifinal – Defeated Eladio Oscar Herrera of Argentina (3 - 0)
5. Final – Defeated Theunis Jacobus van Schalkwyk of South Africa (3 - 0)

Men's Middleweight:

- Mátyás Plachy

1. First Round – Lost to Nelson de Paula Andrade of Brazil (1 - 2)

Men's Light-heavyweight

- István Fazekas

1. First Round – Lost to Toon Pastor of Netherlands (0 - 3)

Men's Heavyweight:

- László Bene

1. Second Round – Lost to Ilkka Koski of Finland (KO 2R)

== Cycling ==
Road Competition

Men's Individual Road Race (190.4 km)

- István Lang — did not finish (→ no ranking)
- István Schillerwein — did not finish (→ no ranking)
- Lajos Látó — did not finish (→ no ranking)

Track Competition

Men's 1.000m Time Trial

- István Lang

- Final — 1:16.9 (→ 18th place)

Men's 1.000m Sprint Scratch Race

- Béla Szekeres — 6th place

== Fencing ==
17 fencers, 14 men and 3 women, represented Hungary in 1952.

Men's foil

- Endre Tilli
- Lajos Maszlay
- Endre Palócz

Men's team foil

- Endre Tilli, Aladár Gerevich, Endre Palócz, Lajos Maszlay, Tibor Berczelly, József Sákovics

Men's épée

- József Sákovics
- Barnabás Berzsenyi
- Béla Rerrich

Men's team épée

- Lajos Balthazár, Barnabás Berzsenyi, Béla Rerrich, József Sákovics, Imre Hennyei

Men's sabre

- Pál Kovács
- Aladár Gerevich
- Tibor Berczelly

Men's team sabre

- Aladár Gerevich, Tibor Berczelly, Rudolf Kárpáti, Pál Kovács, László Rajcsányi, Bertalan Papp

Women's foil

- Ilona Schachererné Elek
- Magdolna Nyári-Kovács
- Margit Elek

== Modern pentathlon ==
Three male pentathletes represented Hungary in 1952. They won gold in the team event with Gábor Benedek winning silver and István Szondy winning bronze in the individual event.

Individual

- Gábor Benedek
- István Szondy
- Aladár Kovácsi

Team

- Gábor Benedek
- István Szondy
- Aladár Kovácsi

== Rowing ==
Hungary had 15 male rowers participate in three out of seven rowing events in 1952.

Men's coxed pair

- László Halász
- József Sátori
- Róbert Zimonyi (cox)

Men's coxless four

- László Decker
- Imre Kaffka
- János Hollósi
- Imre Kemény

Men's eight

- István Sándor
- Csaba Kovács
- Miklós Zágon
- Tibor Nádas
- Rezső Riheczky
- Pál Bakos
- László Marton
- Béla Zsitnik
- Róbert Zimonyi (cox)

== Shooting ==
Six shooters represented Hungary in 1952. In the 25 m pistol event Károly Takács won gold and Szilárd Kun won silver. Ambrus Balogh won bronze in the 50 m pistol.

25 m pistol

- Károly Takács
- Szilárd Kun

50 m pistol

- Ambrus Balogh
- Ferenc Décsey

300 m rifle, three positions

- Ambrus Balogh
- Ferenc Décsey

50 m rifle, three positions

- Imre Ágoston
- János Dosztály

50 m rifle, prone

- Imre Ágoston
- János Dosztály

== Swimming ==
Men

Ranks given are within the heat.

Athlete	Event	Heat		Semifinal		Final	
Athlete	Event	Time	Rank	Time	Rank	Time	Rank
György Ipacs	100 m freestyle	59.1	2 Q	59.4	6	Did not advance	
Géza Kádas	100 m freestyle	58.4	1 Q	57.8	1 Q	58.6	5
György Csordás	400 m freestyle	4:45.7	1 Q	DNS		Did not advance	
Gusztáv Kettesi	400 m freestyle	4:53.0	2 Q	4:54.2	6	Did not advance	
György Csordás	1500 m freestyle	19:26.2	2	—N/a		Did not advance	
László Gyöngyösi	100 m backstroke	1:10.0	4	Did not advance			
Imre Nyéki	100 m backstroke	1:10.6	5	Did not advance			
László Gyöngyösi; György Csordás; Géza Kádas; Imre Nyéki; Gusztáv Kettesi	4 × 200 m freestyle	8:54.6	2 Q	—N/a		8:52.6	5

Women

Ranks given are within the heat.

Athlete	Event	Heat		Semifinal		Final	
Athlete	Event	Time	Rank	Time	Rank	Time	Rank
Ilona Novák	100 m freestyle	1:07.7	2 Q	1:07.8	4	Did not advance	
Katalin Szőke	100 m freestyle	1:07.1	1 Q	1:07.2	2 Q	1:06.8	1st place, gold medalist(s)
Judit Temes	100 m freestyle	1:05.5 OR	1 Q	1:07.4	5 Q	1:07.1	3rd place, bronze medalist(s)
Valéria Gyenge	400 m freestyle	5:22.6	1 Q	5:16.9	1 Q	5:12.1 OR	1st place, gold medalist(s)
Éva Novák	400 m freestyle	5:19.1	1 Q	5:21.3	2 Q	5:13.7	2nd place, silver medalist(s)
Éva Székely	400 m freestyle	5:20.9	2 Q	5:19.3	3 Q	5:17.9	6
Magdolna Hunyadfy	100 m backstroke	1:19.6	4	—N/a		Did not advance	
Klára Killermann	200 m breaststroke	2:59.1	2 Q	2:56.5	2 Q	2:57.6	4
Éva Novák	200 m breaststroke	2:54.0 OR	1 Q	2:55.8	1 Q	2:54.4	2nd place, silver medalist(s)
Éva Székely	200 m breaststroke	2:55.1	1 Q	2:54.0 =OR	1 Q	2:51.7	1st place, gold medalist(s)
Ilona Novák; Judit Temes; Éva Novák; Katalin Szőke; Mária Littomeritzky	4 × 100 m freestyle	4:32.5	1 Q	—N/a		4:24.4 WR	1st place, gold medalist(s)
