= Gusztáv Kettesi =

Hungarian swimmer

Personal information
- Born: 17 May 1929 Debrecen, Hungary
- Died: 4 July 2003 (aged 74) Budapest, Hungary

Sport
- Sport: Swimming

Gusztáv Kettesi (17 May 1929 – 4 July 2003) was a Hungarian swimmer. He competed in two events at the 1952 Summer Olympics.
