= Magdolna Hunyadfy =

Hungarian swimmer

Personal information
- Nationality: Hungarian
- Born: 1 July 1937 (age 89) Budapest, Hungary

Sport
- Sport: Swimming

Magdolna Hunyadfy (born 1 July 1937) is a former Hungarian swimmer. She competed in the women's 400 meter freestyle at the 1952 Summer Olympics.
