= László Gyöngyösi =

Hungarian swimmer (1927–2016)

Personal information
- Nationality: Hungarian
- Born: 9 September 1927 Budapest, Hungary
- Died: 23 February 2016 (aged 88) Albuquerque, New Mexico, United States

Sport
- Sport: Swimming

László Gyöngyösi (9 September 1927 – 23 February 2016) was a Hungarian swimmer. He competed in two events at the 1952 Summer Olympics.
