= Ferenc Décsey =

Hungarian sports shooter

Personal information
- Born: 26 January 1927 Salgótarján, Hungary
- Died: 22 March 2005 (aged 78)

Sport
- Sport: Sports shooting

Ferenc Décsey (26 January 1927 – 22 March 2005) was a Hungarian sports shooter. He competed in two events at the 1952 Summer Olympics.
