= Natália Silva (gymnast) =

Portuguese gymnast

Personal information
- Nationality: Portuguese
- Born: 15 September 1927
- Died: 12 January 1959 (aged 31)

Sport
- Sport: Gymnastics

Achievements and titles
- Olympic finals: 1952 Summer Olympics

Natália Silva (15 September 1927 – 12 January 1959) was a Portuguese gymnast. She competed in five events at the 1952 Summer Olympics. She was killed in a car accident, along with her husband and son, at the age of 31.
