= Maria Laura Amorim =

Portuguese gymnast (born 1932)

Personal information
- Nationality: Portuguese
- Born: 28 April 1932 (age 92)

Sport
- Sport: Gymnastics

Maria Laura da Silva Amorim (born 28 April 1932) is a Portuguese gymnast. She competed in six events at the 1952 Summer Olympics.
