= Norveig Karlsen =

Norwegian artistic gymnast

Personal information
- Nationality: Norwegian
- Born: 16 May 1922 Moss, Norway
- Died: 9 March 1993 (aged 70)

Sport
- Sport: Gymnastics
- Club: Moss Turnforening

Norveig Karlsen (16 May 1922 – 9 March 1993) was a Norwegian artistic gymnast, born in Moss. She competed in gymnastics at the 1952 Summer Olympics in Helsinki.

Karlsen died in Moss on 9 March 1993, at the age of 70.
