= Bergljot Sandvik-Johansen =

Norwegian gymnast, figure skater, and sports official (1922–2020)

Bergljot Sandvik-Johansen (27 January 1922 – 9 January 2020) was a Norwegian gymnast who competed in the 1952 Summer Olympics. She married the former speed skater Aage Johansen (1919–2012) and together they had a daughter, national figure skating champion and 1964 Olympian Berit Unn Johansen and a son Stein Erik Johansen.
