= Arja Lehtinen =

Finnish gymnast (1936–2026)

Personal information
- Nationality: Finnish
- Born: 23 April 1936 (age 90) Helsinki, Finland

Sport
- Sport: Gymnastics

Arja Lehtinen (23 April 1936 – 29 May 2026) was a Finnish gymnast. She competed in seven events at the 1952 Summer Olympics.
