= Maila Nisula =

Finnish gymnast (1931–2023)

Personal information
- Nationality: Finnish
- Born: 18 March 1931; Viipuri, Finland
- Died: 2 August 2023 (aged 92); Lappeenranta, Finland

Sport
- Sport: Gymnastics

Maila Sinikka Nisula (18 March 1931 – 2 August 2023) was a Finnish gymnast. She competed in seven events at the 1952 Summer Olympics. Nisula died in Lappeenranta on 2 August 2023, at the age of 92.
