= Honorata Marcińczak =

Polish gymnast (1930–2022)

Personal information
- Nationality: Polish
- Born: 17 June 1930; Kraków, Poland
- Died: 30 July 2022 (aged 92)

Sport
- Sport: Gymnastics

Honorata Marcińczak (17 June 1930 – 30 July 2022) was a Polish gymnast. She competed in seven events at the 1952 Summer Olympics.
