= Sonja Rožman =

Slovenian gymnast (1934–2010)

Personal information
- Nationality: Slovenian
- Born: 1934; Jesenice, Yugoslavia
- Died: January 2010

Sport
- Sport: Gymnastics

Sonja Rožman (1934 – January 2010) was a Slovenian gymnast. She competed in seven events at the 1952 Summer Olympics. Rožman died in January 2010.
