= Ileana Gyarfaș =

Romanian gymnast

Personal information
- Nationality: Romanian
- Born: 8 January 1932 Cluj-Napoca, Romania

Sport
- Sport: Gymnastics

Ileana Gyarfaș (born 8 January 1932) is a Romanian gymnast. She competed in seven events at the 1952 Summer Olympics.
