= Gertrude Gries =

Austrian gymnast (1924–2025)

Personal information
- Nationality: Austrian
- Born: 16 October 1924
- Died: 22 May 2025 (aged 100)

Sport
- Sport: Gymnastics

Gertrude Gries (16 October 1924 – 22 May 2025) was an Austrian gymnast. She competed at the 1948 Summer Olympics and the 1952 Summer Olympics. Gries turned 100 in October 2024, and died on 22 May 2025.
