= Vasilka Stancheva =

Bulgarian gymnast (born 1929)

Personal information
- Nationality: Bulgarian
- Born: 29 November 1929

Sport
- Sport: Gymnastics

Vasilka Stancheva (Bulgarian: Василка Станчева) (born 29 November 1929) is a Bulgarian gymnast. She competed in seven events at the 1952 Summer Olympics.
