= Tsvetanka Stancheva =

Bulgarian gymnast (born 1929)

Personal information
- Nationality: Bulgarian
- Born: 18 August 1929

Sport
- Sport: Gymnastics

Tsvetanka Stancheva (Bulgarian: Цветанка Станчева) (born 18 August 1929) is a Bulgarian gymnast. She competed at the 1952 Summer Olympics and the 1956 Summer Olympics.
