= Colette Fanara =

French gymnast (born 1925)

Colette Fanara (born 15 February 1925) is a French former artistic gymnast. She competed at the 1952 Summer Olympics in Helsinki.
