= Ada Smolnikar =

Slovenian gymnast (born 1935)

- Full name: Ada Smolnikar – Bešter
- Born: 1935 (age 90–91) Slovenski Javornik, Kingdom of Yugoslavia

Gymnastics career
- Discipline: Women's artistic gymnastics
- Former countries represented: Yugoslavia
- Head coach: Mirko Petarč

Ada Smolnikar-Bešter (born 1935) is a Slovenian gymnast. She competed in seven events at the 1952 Summer Olympics.
