= Elisabeta Abrudeanu =

Romanian gymnast

- Born: 28 June 1926

Gymnastics career
- Discipline: Women's artistic gymnastics
- Country represented: Romania

Elisabeta Abrudeanu (born 28 June 1926) is a Romanian former artistic gymnast. She competed at the 1952 Summer Olympics.
