= Elisabetta Durelli =

Italian gymnast

Personal information
- Nationality: Italian
- Born: 17 January 1936 Lodi, Lombardy, Italy
- Died: 26 October 2025 (aged 89) Milan, Italy

Sport
- Sport: Gymnastics

Elisabetta Erminia Durelli (17 January 1936 – 26 October 2025) was an Italian gymnast. She competed in seven events at the 1952 Summer Olympics.
