= Stefania Świerzy =

Polish gymnast (1934–2020)

Personal information
- Nationality: Polish
- Born: 19 June 1934; Ruda Śląska, Poland
- Died: 11 June 2020 (aged 86)

Sport
- Sport: Gymnastics

Stefania Świerzy (19 June 1934 – 11 June 2020) was a Polish gymnast. She competed in seven events at the 1952 Summer Olympics.
