= Hilde Koop =

German gymnast

Personal information
- Nationality: German
- Born: 26 May 1921
- Died: 22 March 2008 (aged 86)

Sport
- Sport: Gymnastics

Hilde Koop (26 May 1921 – 22 March 2008) was a German gymnast. She competed in seven events at the 1952 Summer Olympics.
