= Stela Perin =

Romanian gymnast (born 1934)

Stela Perin (born 6 May 1934 in Arad, Romania) is a Romanian former artistic gymnast. She competed at the 1952 Summer Olympics.
