= Nada Spasić =

Yugoslav gymnast (1934–2015)

Personal information
- Nationality: Yugoslav
- Born: 7 March 1934
- Died: 7 August 2015 (aged 81)

Sport
- Sport: Gymnastics

Nada Spasić (7 March 1934 – 7 August 2015) was a Yugoslav gymnast. She competed in seven events at the 1952 Summer Olympics. Spasić died on 7 August 2015, at the age of 81.
