= Stoyanka Angelova =

Bulgarian gymnast (born 1928)

Personal information
- Nationality: Bulgarian
- Born: 28 March 1928; Burgas, Bulgaria

Sport
- Sport: Gymnastics

Stoyanka Angelova (Bulgarian: Стоянка Ангелова) (born 28 March 1928) is a Bulgarian gymnast. She competed in seven events at the 1952 Summer Olympics.
