= Eveline Slavici =

Romanian gymnast (1932–2006)

Eveline Slavici (7 December 1932 – 6 October 2006) was a Romanian artistic gymnast. She competed at the 1952 Summer Olympics. Slavici was born in Bucharest on 7 December 1932. She died there on 6 October 2006, at the age of 73.
