= Ida Kadlec =

Austrian gymnast (born 1929)

Ida Kadletz
Personal information
- Nationality: Austrian
- Born: 6 October 1929

Sport
- Sport: Gymnastics

Ida Kadletz (born 6 October 1929) is an Austrian gymnast. She competed in seven events at the 1952 Summer Olympics.
