= Anka Drinić =

Yugoslav gymnast (1924–2008)

Personal information
- Nationality: Yugoslav
- Born: 11 March 1924
- Died: 2008

Sport
- Sport: Gymnastics

Anka Drinić (11 March 1924 – 2008) was a Yugoslav gymnast. She competed in seven events at the 1952 Summer Olympics.
