= Valerie Mullins =

British gymnast (born 1935)

Personal information
- Nationality: British
- Born: 17 January 1935 (age 90); Swansea, Wales

Sport
- Sport: Gymnastics

Valerie Mullins (born 17 January 1935) is a British gymnast. She competed in seven events at the 1952 Summer Olympics.
