= Vappu Salonen =

Finnish gymnast

Personal information
- Nationality: Finnish
- Born: 12 February 1929; Tampere, Finland
- Died: 9 July 2017 (aged 88)

Sport
- Sport: Gymnastics

Vappu Salonen (12 February 1929 – 9 July 2017) was a Finnish gymnast. She competed in seven events at the 1952 Summer Olympics.
