= Inge Sedlmaier =

German gymnast

Personal information
- Nationality: German
- Born: 4 May 1925; Landshut, Germany
- Died: 13 March 1976 (aged 50); Bischofswiesen, Germany

Sport
- Sport: Gymnastics

Inge Sedlmaier (4 May 1925 – 13 March 1976) was a German gymnast. She competed in seven events at the 1952 Summer Olympics.
