= Raili Hoviniemi =

Finnish gymnast

Personal information
- Nationality: Finnish
- Born: 13 May 1936 Joensuu, Finland
- Died: 14 May 2018 (aged 82)

Sport
- Sport: Gymnastics

Raili Hoviniemi (13 May 1936 – 14 May 2018) was a Finnish gymnast. She competed in seven events at the 1952 Summer Olympics.
