= Gertrude Winnige-Barosch =

Austrian gymnast (born 1929)

Personal information
- Nationality: Austrian
- Born: 19 January 1929; Vienna, Austria

Sport
- Sport: Gymnastics

Gertrude Winnige-Barosch (born 19 January 1929) is a former Austrian gymnast. She competed at the 1948 Summer Olympics and the 1952 Summer Olympics.
