= Pirkko Vilppunen =

Finnish gymnast (1934–2017)

Personal information
- Nationality: Finnish
- Born: 19 May 1934 Viipuri, Finland
- Died: 2017 (aged 82–83)

Sport
- Sport: Gymnastics

Pirkko Vilppunen (19 May 1934 – 2017) was a Finnish gymnast. She competed in seven events at the 1952 Summer Olympics.
