= Hildegard Grill =

Austrian gymnast (1927–2023)

Personal information
- Nationality: Austrian
- Born: 20 October 1927
- Died: 12 October 2023 (aged 95) Linz, Austria

Sport
- Sport: Gymnastics

Hildegard Grill (20 October 1927 – 12 October 2023) was an Austrian gymnast. She competed in seven events at the 1952 Summer Olympics. Grill died in Linz on 12 October 2023, at the age of 95.
