= Hedwig Traindl =

Austrian gymnast (born 1934)

Personal information
- Nationality: Austrian
- Born: 5 October 1934 (age 90)

Sport
- Sport: Gymnastics

Hedwig Traindl (born 5 October 1934) is an Austrian gymnast. She competed in seven events at the 1952 Summer Olympics.
