= Pirkko Pyykönen =

Finnish gymnast

Personal information
- Nationality: Finnish
- Born: 18 June 1936 (age 90) Helsinki, Finland

Sport
- Sport: Gymnastics

Pirkko Pyykönen (born 18 June 1936) is a Finnish gymnast. She competed in seven events at the 1952 Summer Olympics.
