= Yordanka Yovkova =

Bulgarian gymnast (born 1933)

Personal information
- Nationality: Bulgarian
- Born: 8 January 1933 (age 93)

Sport
- Sport: Gymnastics

Yordanka Yovkova (Bulgarian: Йорданка Йовкова) (born 8 January 1933) is a Bulgarian gymnast. She competed in seven events at the 1952 Summer Olympics.
