= Marija Ivandekić =

Yugoslav gymnast (born 1925)

Personal information
- Nationality: Yugoslav
- Born: 25 August 1925
- Died: 20 September 1967

Sport
- Sport: Gymnastics

Marija Ivandekić (25 August 1925 – 20 September 1967) was a Yugoslav gymnast. She competed in seven events at the 1952 Summer Olympics.
