= Ivanka Dolzheva =

Bulgarian gymnast (born 1935)

Personal information
- Nationality: Bulgarian
- Born: 10 September 1935 (age 89); Sofia, Bulgaria

Sport
- Sport: Gymnastics

Ivanka Dolzheva (Bulgarian: Иванка Должева) (born 10 September 1935) is a Bulgarian gymnast. She competed at the 1952 Summer Olympics, the 1956 Summer Olympics and the 1960 Summer Olympics.
