= Raija Simola =

Finnish gymnast (1932–2017

Personal information
- Nationality: Finnish
- Born: 28 April 1932 Lahti, Finland
- Died: 24 March 2017 (aged 84)

Sport
- Sport: Gymnastics

Raija Simola (28 April 1932 – 24 March 2017) was a Finnish gymnast. She competed in seven events at the 1952 Summer Olympics. Simola died on 24 March 2017, at the age of 84.
