= Penka Prisadashka =

Bulgarian gymnast (born 1929)

Personal information
- Full name: Penka Mircheva Prisadashka
- Nationality: Bulgarian
- Born: 5 March 1929

Sport
- Sport: Gymnastics

Penka Prisadashka (born 5 March 1929) is a Bulgarian former gymnast. She competed in seven events at the 1952 Summer Olympics.
