= Olga Munteanu =

Romanian gymnast

Olga Munteanu (born 18 October 1927) is a former artistic gymnast. She competed at the 1952 Summer Olympics.
