= Zofia Kowalczyk =

Polish gymnast (1929–2025)

Personal information
- Nationality: Polish
- Born: 30 April 1929; Kraków, Poland
- Died: 19 July 2025 (aged 96)

Sport
- Sport: Gymnastics

Zofia Kowalczyk (30 April 1929 – 19 July 2025) was a Polish gymnast. She competed in seven events at the 1952 Summer Olympics. Kowalczyk died on 19 July 2025, at the age of 96.
