= Gerti Fesl =

Austrian gymnast (1931–2024)

Personal information
- Nationality: Austrian
- Born: 29 September 1931
- Died: 27 January 2024 (aged 92)

Sport
- Sport: Gymnastics

Gerti Fesl (29 September 1931 – 27 January 2024) was an Austrian gymnast. She competed at the 1948 Summer Olympics and the 1952 Summer Olympics. Fesl died on 27 January 2024, at the age of 92.
