= Nanny Simon =

Dutch gymnast (1931–2023)

Personal information
- Full name: Anna Barbara Simon
- Nationality: Dutch
- Born: 23 June 1931 Amsterdam, Netherlands
- Died: 28 March 2023 (aged 91) De Bilt, Netherlands

Sport
- Sport: Gymnastics

Anna Barbara "Nanny" Simon (23 June 1931 – 28 March 2023) was a Dutch gymnast. She competed in seven events at the 1952 Summer Olympics. Simon died in De Bilt on 28 March 2023, at the age of 91.
