= Tanja Žutić =

Slovenian gymnast (1927–2005)

Personal information
- Nationality: Yugoslavian
- Born: 29 January 1927; Ptuj, Kingdom of Serbs, Croats and Slovenes
- Died: 11 January 2005 (aged 77); Zagreb, Croatia

Sport
- Sport: Gymnastics

Tanja Žutić (29 January 1927 – 11 January 2005) was a Slovenian-Yugoslavian gymnast. She competed at the 1948 Summer Olympics and the 1952 Summer Olympics.

Zutic competed in the women entries for categories such as Individual and Team All Round Gymnastics, Horse Vault, Balance Beams, and six other gymnast related entries. She performed all these at the ages of 21 (1948 Olympics) and 25 (1952 Olympics). Despite her performance, Zutic did not manage to earn any medals at either of the Summer Olympic Games in which she participated.
