= List of gymnasts at the 1948 Summer Olympics =

This is a list of the gymnasts who represented their country at the 1948 Summer Olympics in London from 29 July to 14 August 1948. Only one discipline, artistic gymnastics, was included in the Games.

== Female artistic gymnasts ==
NOC	Name	Date of birth (Age)	Hometown
Austria	Erika Enzenhofer	2 September 1926 (aged 21)	
Austria	Gerti Fesl	29 September 1931 (aged 16)	
Austria	Trude Gollner-Kolar	23 January 1926 (aged 22)	Graz, Austria
Austria	Gertrude Gries	16 October 1924 (aged 23)	
Austria	Gretchen Hehenberger	10 February 1918 (aged 30)	
Austria	Traudl Ruckser	13 February 1925 (aged 23)	Vienna, Austria
Austria	Edeltraud Schramm	16 December 1923 (aged 24)	Linz, Austria
Austria	Gertrude Winnige-Barosch	19 January 1929 (aged 19)	
Belgium	Julienne Boudewijns	11 August 1929 (aged 18)	Antwerp, Belgium
Belgium	Thérèse de Grijze	24 August 1926 (aged 21)	Ostend, Belgium
Belgium	Anna Jordaens	20 December 1927 (aged 20)	Mortsel, Belgium
Belgium	Denise Parmentiers	5 January 1915 (aged 33)	Liège, Belgium
Belgium	Jenny Schumacher	10 September 1921 (aged 26)	Heusy, Belgium
Belgium	Yvonne van Bets	14 December 1928 (aged 19)	Mechelen, Belgium
Belgium	Albertine van Roy-Moens	13 October 1915 (aged 32)	Willebroek, Belgium
Belgium	Caroline Verbraecken-De Loose	26 November 1924 (aged 23)	Antwerp, Belgium
Czechoslovakia	Zdeňka Honsová	3 July 1927 (aged 21)	Jihlava, Czechoslovakia
Czechoslovakia	Marie Kovářová	11 May 1927 (aged 21)	Luleč, Czechoslovakia
Czechoslovakia	Miloslava Misáková	25 February 1922 (aged 26)	Horákov, Czechoslovakia
Czechoslovakia	Milena Müllerová	9 June 1923 (aged 25)	Babice, Czechoslovakia
Czechoslovakia	Věra Růžičková	10 August 1928 (aged 19)	Brno, Czechoslovakia
Czechoslovakia	Olga Šilhánová	21 December 1920 (aged 27)	Vysoké nad Jizerou, Czechoslovakia
Czechoslovakia	Božena Srncová	11 June 1925 (aged 23)	Prague, Czechoslovakia
Czechoslovakia	Zdeňka Veřmiřovská	27 June 1913 (aged 35)	Kopřivnice, Austria-Hungary
France	Gisèle Guibert	4 July 1925 (aged 23)	Paris, France
France	Colette Hué	11 May 1932 (aged 16)	Paris, France
France	Christine Palau	11 June 1930 (aged 18)	Paris, France
France	Irène Pittelioen	13 May 1927 (aged 21)	Lille, France
France	Jeanine Touchard	25 November 1924 (aged 23)	Bondy, France
France	Florence Vallée	circa 1928	
France	Jeanette Vogelbacher	2 February 1922 (aged 26)	Belfort, France
France	Monique Yvinou	10 June 1928 (aged 20)	Quimper, France
Great Britain	Joan Airey	4 April 1926 (aged 22)	Croydon, England
Great Britain	Cissy Davies	1 December 1932 (aged 15)	Swansea, Wales
Great Britain	Pat Evans	1926	Swansea, Wales
Great Britain	Dorothy Hey	1931	Bradford, England
Great Britain	Irene Hirst	11 July 1930 (aged 18)	North Bierley, England
Great Britain	Pat Hirst	18 November 1918 (aged 29)	Wortley, England
Great Britain	Audrey Rennard	14 January 1933 (aged 15)	North Bierley, England
Great Britain	Dorothy Smith	16 November 1919 (aged 28)	Keighley, England
Hungary	Anna Fehér	24 September 1921 (aged 26)	Budapest, Hungary
Hungary	Erzsébet Gulyás-Köteles	3 November 1924 (aged 23)	Budapest, Hungary
Hungary	Irén Karcsics	18 March 1927 (aged 21)	Budapest, Hungary
Hungary	Mária Kövi-Zalai	20 October 1924 (aged 23)	Târgu Mureș, Romania
Hungary	Margit Nagy-Sándor	29 May 1921 (aged 27)	Debrecen, Hungary
Hungary	Erzsébet Sárkány-Balázs	15 October 1920 (aged 27)	Budapest, Hungary
Hungary	Olga Tass	29 March 1929 (aged 19)	Pécs, Hungary
Hungary	Edit Weckinger	5 May 1923 (aged 25)	Kispent, Hungary
Italy	Renata Bianchi	12 July 1926 (aged 22)	Cornigliano, Italy
Italy	Norma Icardi	16 August 1930 (aged 17)	Trieste, Italy
Italy	Licia Macchini	11 July 1930 (aged 18)	Lodi, Italy
Italy	Laura Micheli	21 April 1931 (aged 17)	Trieste, Italy
Italy	Wanda Nuti	21 September 1925 (aged 22)	Colle di Val d'Elsa, Italy
Italy	Luciana Pezzoni	31 October 1928 (aged 19)	Lodi, Italy
Italy	Elena Santoni	30 April 1930 (aged 18)	Nereto, Italy
Italy	Lilia Torriani	30 November 1920 (aged 27)	Genoa, Italy
Netherlands	Lenie Gerrietsen	28 March 1930 (aged 18)	Utrecht, Netherlands
Netherlands	Truida Heil-Bonnet	11 July 1920 (aged 28)	Amsterdam, Netherlands
Netherlands	Dientje Meijer-Haantjes	17 March 1918 (aged 30)	Amsterdam, Netherlands
Netherlands	Klara Post	5 July 1926 (aged 22)	Arnhem, Netherlands
Netherlands	Annie Ros	5 March 1926 (aged 22)	Utrecht, Netherlands
Netherlands	Anna Maria van Geene	27 February 1928 (aged 20)	Amsterdam, Netherlands
Netherlands	Cootje van Kampen-Tonneman	15 September 1921 (aged 26)	Horn, Netherlands
Netherlands	Jacoba Wijnands	28 June 1924 (aged 24)	Rotterdam, Netherlands
Sweden	Ingrid Andersson	7 February 1924 (aged 24)	Stockholm, Sweden
Sweden	Märta Andersson	14 February 1925 (aged 23)	Malmö, Sweden
Sweden	Kerstin Bohman	9 November 1914 (aged 33)	Hudiksvall, Sweden
Sweden	Stina Haage	3 August 1924 (aged 23)	Landskrona, Sweden
Sweden	Gunnel Johansson	12 August 1922 (aged 25)	Växjö, Sweden
Sweden	Karin Lindberg	6 October 1929 (aged 18)	Kalix, Sweden
Sweden	Göta Pettersson	18 December 1926 (aged 21)	Stockholm, Sweden
Sweden	Ingrid Sandahl	5 November 1924 (aged 23)	Stockholm, Sweden
United States	Ladislava Bakanic	3 May 1924 (aged 24)	New York, New York
United States	Marian Barone	18 March 1924 (aged 24)	Philadelphia, Pennsylvania
United States	Dorothy Dalton	1 August 1922 (aged 25)	Newark, New Jersey
United States	Meta Elste	16 October 1919 (aged 28)	Bremen, Germany
United States	Consetta Lenz	26 September 1918 (aged 29)	Allegany, New York
United States	Helen Schifano	13 April 1922 (aged 26)	Newark, New Jersey
United States	Clara Schroth	5 October 1920 (aged 27)	Philadelphia, Pennsylvania
United States	Anita Simonis	2 March 1926 (aged 22)	New York, New York
Yugoslavia	Dragica Basletić	30 August 1916 (aged 31)	Rijeka, Yugoslavia
Yugoslavia	Neža Černe	20 January 1933 (aged 15)	Maribor, Yugoslavia
Yugoslavia	Draginja Đipalović	unknown	
Yugoslavia	Dragana Đorđević	2 June 1914 (aged 34)	
Yugoslavia	Vida Gerbec	12 July 1925 (aged 23)	Trieste, Italy
Yugoslavia	Zlatica Mijatović	1 March 1922 (aged 26)	Sombor, Yugoslavia
Yugoslavia	Ruža Vojsk	31 March 1930 (aged 18)	Maribor, Yugoslavia
Yugoslavia	Tanja Žutić	29 January 1927 (aged 21)	Ptuj, Yugoslavia

== Male artistic gymnasts ==
NOC	Name	Date of birth (Age)	Hometown
Argentina	Arturo Amos	6 March 1927 (aged 21)	Temperley, Argentina
Argentina	César Bonoris	22 September 1927 (aged 20)	
Argentina	Pedro Lonchibuco	circa 1920	
Argentina	Roberto Núñez	circa 1928	
Argentina	Enrique Rapesta	12 April 1919 (aged 29)	Saladillo, Argentina
Argentina	Jorge Soler	unknown	
Argentina	Jorge Vidal	circa 1917	
Austria	Karl Bohusch	18 May 1916 (aged 32)	Vienna, Austria
Austria	Hans Friedrich	9 February 1924 (aged 24)	
Austria	Gottfried Hermann	22 June 1910 (aged 38)	
Austria	Robert Pranz	22 October 1905 (aged 42)	
Austria	Hans Sauter	6 June 1925 (aged 23)	Bregenz, Austria
Austria	Willi Schreyer	9 September 1914 (aged 33)	Salzburg, Austria
Austria	Willi Welt	19 August 1926 (aged 21)	
Austria	Ernst Wister	11 July 1922 (aged 26)	
Cuba	Ángel Aguiar	7 November 1926 (aged 21)	Havana, Cuba
Cuba	Alejandro Díaz	24 November 1924 (aged 23)	Havana, Cuba
Cuba	Fernando Lecuona	20 October 1926 (aged 21)	Havana, Cuba
Cuba	Rafael Lecuona	2 June 1928 (aged 20)	Havana, Cuba
Cuba	Raimundo Rey	29 July 1925 (aged 23)	Havana, Cuba
Cuba	Baldomero Rubiera	24 November 1926 (aged 21)	Havana, Cuba
Cuba	Roberto Villacián	5 September 1928 (aged 19)	Havana, Cuba
Czechoslovakia	Pavel Benetka	26 January 1921 (aged 27)	Prague, Czechoslovakia
Czechoslovakia	Gustav Hrubý	18 April 1916 (aged 32)	Vienna, Austria
Czechoslovakia	Vladimír Karas	22 May 1927 (aged 21)	Prague, Czechoslovakia
Czechoslovakia	Miroslav Málek	30 November 1915 (aged 32)	Prague, Czechoslovakia
Czechoslovakia	Vratislav Petráček	22 February 1910 (aged 38)	České Budějovice, Czechoslovakia
Czechoslovakia	Zdeněk Růžička	15 April 1925 (aged 23)	Ivančice, Czechoslovakia
Czechoslovakia	Leo Sotorník	11 April 1926 (aged 22)	Vítkovice, Czechoslovakia
Czechoslovakia	František Wirth	7 March 1915 (aged 33)	Prague, Czechoslovakia
Denmark	Elkana Grønne	24 February 1925 (aged 23)	Esbjerg, Denmark
Denmark	Freddy Jensen	28 January 1926 (aged 22)	Nuuk, Greenland
Denmark	Poul Jessen	17 February 1926 (aged 22)	Copenhagen, Denmark
Denmark	Børge Minerth	2 April 1920 (aged 28)	Copenhagen, Denmark
Denmark	Vilhelm Møller	20 February 1922 (aged 26)	
Denmark	Gunner Olesen	22 December 1916 (aged 31)	Slagelse, Denmark
Denmark	Arnold Thomsen	31 May 1913 (aged 35)	Esbjerg, Denmark
Denmark	Volmer Thomsen	31 October 1917 (aged 30)	Horsens, Denmark
Egypt	Mahmoud Abdel-Aal	11 February 1929 (aged 19)	
Egypt	Moustafa Abdelal	unknown	Cairo, Egypt
Egypt	Ahmed Khalaf Ali	unknown	
Egypt	Mohamed Aly	unknown	
Egypt	Ahmed Khalil El-Giddawi	1931	Cairo, Egypt
Egypt	Ali El-Hefnawi	unknown	
Egypt	Mohamed Roushdi	21 July 1921 (aged 27)	Cairo, Egypt
Egypt	Ali Zaky	1930	Alexandria, Egypt
Finland	Paavo Aaltonen	12 December 1919 (aged 28)	Kemi, Finland
Finland	Veikko Huhtanen	5 June 1919 (aged 29)	Vyborg, Finland
Finland	Kalevi Laitinen	19 May 1918 (aged 30)	Kotka, Finland
Finland	Olavi Rove	29 July 1915 (aged 33)	Helsinki, Finland
Finland	Aleksanteri Saarvala	9 April 1913 (aged 35)	Vyborg, Finland
Finland	Sulo Salmi	4 March 1914 (aged 34)	Vaasa, Finland
Finland	Heikki Savolainen	28 September 1907 (aged 40)	Joensuu, Finland
Finland	Einari Teräsvirta	7 December 1914 (aged 33)	Vyborg, Finland
France	Alphonse Anger	20 August 1915 (aged 32)	Pfastatt, France
France	Marcel de Wolf	19 September 1919 (aged 28)	Trith-Saint-Léger, France
France	Raymond Dot	20 December 1926 (aged 21)	Puteaux, France
France	Lucien Masset	11 May 1914 (aged 34)	Lyon, France
France	Michel Mathiot	23 August 1926 (aged 21)	Besançon, France
France	Antoine Schildwein	10 August 1911 (aged 36)	Sarreguemines, France
France	Auguste Sirot	29 September 1919 (aged 28)	Roanne, France
France	André Weingand	14 March 1915 (aged 33)	Luxeuil-les-Bains, France
Great Britain	Ken Buffin	1 November 1923 (aged 24)	Barry, Wales
Great Britain	Jack Flaherty	21 September 1908 (aged 39)	Manchester, England
Great Britain	Glyn Hopkins	1 October 1928 (aged 19)	Pontypridd, Wales
Great Britain	Percy May	6 October 1927 (aged 20)	Swansea, Wales
Great Britain	Frank Turner	5 November 1922 (aged 25)	London, England
Great Britain	Ivor Vice	23 July 1929 (aged 19)	Swansea, Wales
Great Britain	Alec Wales	4 December 1916 (aged 31)	Stepney, England
Great Britain	George Weedon	3 July 1920 (aged 28)	Richmond, England
Hungary	László Baranyai	13 January 1920 (aged 28)	Budapest, Hungary
Hungary	József Fekete	27 February 1923 (aged 25)	Kecskemét, Hungary
Hungary	János Mogyorósi-Klencs	31 March 1922 (aged 26)	Debrecen, Hungary
Hungary	Győző Mogyorossy	23 December 1914 (aged 33)	Debrecen, Hungary
Hungary	Ferenc Pataki	18 September 1917 (aged 30)	Budapest, Hungary
Hungary	Lajos Sántha	13 July 1915 (aged 33)	Csorvás, Hungary
Hungary	Lajos Tóth	25 August 1914 (aged 33)	Debrecen, Hungary
Hungary	Ferenc Várkõi	27 January 1916 (aged 32)	Csongrád, Hungary
Italy	Egidio Armelloni	22 July 1909 (aged 39)	Soresina, Italy
Italy	Guido Figone	13 October 1927 (aged 20)	Chiavari, Italy
Italy	Danilo Fioravanti	23 August 1913 (aged 34)	Berra, Italy
Italy	Domenico Grosso	15 June 1922 (aged 26)	Legnano, Italy
Italy	Savino Guglielmetti	26 November 1911 (aged 36)	Milan, Italy
Italy	Ettore Perego	11 April 1913 (aged 35)	Monza, Italy
Italy	Quinto Vadi	13 September 1921 (aged 26)	Faenza, Italy
Italy	Luigi Zanetti	20 September 1921 (aged 26)	Padua, Italy
Luxembourg	Jos Bernard	26 April 1924 (aged 24)	Cologne, Germany
Luxembourg	Menn Krecke	20 December 1922 (aged 25)	Neudorf-Weimershof, Luxembourg
Luxembourg	Jey Kugeler	18 April 1910 (aged 38)	Schifflange, Luxembourg
Luxembourg	Pierre Schmitz	16 May 1920 (aged 28)	Differdange, Luxembourg
Luxembourg	René Schroeder	23 December 1920 (aged 27)	Esch-sur-Alzette, Luxembourg
Luxembourg	Josy Stoffel	27 June 1928 (aged 20)	Differdange, Luxembourg
Luxembourg	Polo Welfring	10 April 1926 (aged 22)	Esch-sur-Alzette, Luxembourg
Luxembourg	Georges Wengler	14 November 1918 (aged 29)	Luxembourg City, Luxembourg
Mexico	Dionisio Aguilar	unknown	
Mexico	Jorge Castro	22 June 1919 (aged 29)	Mexico City, Mexico
Mexico	Rubén Lira	22 October 1922 (aged 25)	Monterrey, Mexico
Mexico	Everardo Ríos	12 May 1915 (aged 33)	Los Aldamas, Mexico
Mexico	Nicanor Villarreal	1 April 1919 (aged 29)	Monterrey, Mexico
Switzerland	Karl Frei	8 March 1917 (aged 31)	Regensdorf, Switzerland
Switzerland	Christian Kipfer	19 December 1921 (aged 26)	
Switzerland	Walter Lehmann	13 January 1919 (aged 29)	Hütten, Switzerland
Switzerland	Robert Lucy	20 February 1923 (aged 25)	
Switzerland	Michael Reusch	3 February 1914 (aged 34)	Rothrist, Switzerland
Switzerland	Josef Stalder	6 February 1919 (aged 29)	Lucerne, Switzerland
Switzerland	Emil Studer	11 May 1914 (aged 34)	
Switzerland	Melchior Thalmann	21 May 1924 (aged 24)	
United States	William Bonsall	31 December 1923 (aged 24)	Philadelphia, Pennsylvania
United States	Louis Bordo	2 June 1920 (aged 28)	Philadelphia, Pennsylvania
United States	Frank Cumiskey	6 September 1912 (aged 35)	West New York, New Jersey
United States	Vincent D'Autorio	1 October 1915 (aged 32)	Newark, New Jersey
United States	Joe Kotys	31 October 1925 (aged 22)	Olyphant, Pennsylvania
United States	Bill Roetzheim	7 August 1928 (aged 19)	Chicago, Illinois
United States	Ed Scrobe	26 January 1923 (aged 25)	New York, New York
United States	Ray Sorensen	12 May 1922 (aged 26)	Warren, Pennsylvania
Yugoslavia	Stjepan Boltižar	1 August 1913 (aged 34)	Varaždin, Yugoslavia
Yugoslavia	Konrad Grilc	25 October 1909 (aged 38)	Celje, Yugoslavia
Yugoslavia	Karel Janež	22 January 1914 (aged 34)	Ljubljana, Yugoslavia
Yugoslavia	Drago Jelić	16 November 1914 (aged 33)	
Yugoslavia	Ivica Jelić	28 September 1917 (aged 30)	
Yugoslavia	Josip Kujundžić	1916	Bačka, Yugoslavia
Yugoslavia	Miro Longyka	22 March 1913 (aged 35)	Ljubljana, Yugoslavia
Yugoslavia	Jakob Šubelj	1922	Ljubljana, Yugoslavia
