= Gymnastics at the 1948 Summer Olympics – Women's artistic team all-around =

Women's artistic team all-around at the Games of the XIV Olympiad
- Venue: Earls Court Exhibition Centre
- Date: 13–14 August 1948
- Competitors: 88 from 11 nations
- Winning score: 445.45

Medalists
1st place, gold medalist(s)		Zdeňka Honsová; Marie Kovářová; Miloslava Misáková; Milena Müllerová; Věra Růžičková; Olga Šilhánová; Božena Srncová; Zdeňka Veřmiřovská	Czechoslovakia
2nd place, silver medalist(s)		Edit Weckinger; Mária Zalai-Kövi; Irén Karcsics; Erzsébet Gulyás-Köteles; Erzsébet Balázs; Olga Tass; Anna Fehér; Margit Nagy-Sándor	Hungary
3rd place, bronze medalist(s)		Ladislava Bakanic; Marian Barone; Consetta Lenz; Dorothy Dalton; Meta Elste; Helen Schifano; Clara Schroth; Anita Simonis	United States

The women's artistic team all-around competition at the 1948 Summer Olympics was held at Earls Court Exhibition Centre on 13 and 14 August. It was the third appearance of the event.

== Competition format ==
The gymnastics format continued to use the aggregation format used in 1928 and 1936, the previous appearances of the event. The parallel bars, however, were replaced by the flying rings (the only time women competed using the flying rings in the Olympics). Each nation entered a team of eight gymnasts. All entrants in the gymnastics competitions performed both a compulsory exercise and a voluntary exercise on the vault and beam, and a compulsory exercise on the flying rings, with the scores summed to give a final total. Each team also performed two group exercises. The top six individual scores on each team and the two group exercises were summed to give a team all-around score. No individual medals (for either all-around or apparatus) were awarded for women.

== Results ==
Rank	Nation	Gymnast	Individual results										Group exercises		Final Team total
Rank	Nation	Gymnast	Balance beam			Vault (gymnastics)			Flying rings	Individual Gymnast Totals			w/o hand apparatus	w/ hand apparatus	Final Team total
Rank	Nation	Gymnast	C	V	Beam Total	C	V	Vault Total	C (compulsory exercise only)	C	V	Gymnast grand total	w/o hand apparatus	w/ hand apparatus	Final Team total
1st place, gold medalist(s)	Czechoslovakia	Zdeňka Honsová	9.15	14.25	23.40	8.40	13.45	21.85	9.60	27.15	27.70	54.85	62.80	65.95	445.45
1st place, gold medalist(s)	Czechoslovakia	Miloslava Misáková	9.05	14.10	23.15	7.95	13.0	20.95	9.30	26.30	27.10	53.40	62.80	65.95	445.45
1st place, gold medalist(s)	Czechoslovakia	Věra Růžičková	8.90	13.50	22.40	8.20	13.50	21.70	8.90	26.00	27.00	53.00	62.80	65.95	445.45
1st place, gold medalist(s)	Czechoslovakia	Božena Srncová	9.20	13.75	22.95	7.55	13.15	20.70	9.30	26.05	26.90	52.95	62.80	65.95	445.45
1st place, gold medalist(s)	Czechoslovakia	Milena Müllerová	8.30	13.75	22.05	7.75	13.50	21.25	9.20	25.25	27.25	52.50	62.80	65.95	445.45
1st place, gold medalist(s)	Czechoslovakia	Zdeňka Veřmiřovská	6.80	14.60	21.40	7.90	12.70	20.60	8.00	22.70	27.30	50.00	62.80	65.95	445.45
1st place, gold medalist(s)	Czechoslovakia	Olga Šilhánová	6.60	13.90	20.50	7.85	12.70	20.55	8.90	23.35	26.60	~~49.95~~	62.80	65.95	445.45
1st place, gold medalist(s)	Czechoslovakia	Marie Kovářová	5.90	12.95	18.85	7.75	13.85	21.60	9.15	22.80	26.80	~~49.60~~	62.80	65.95	445.45
1st place, gold medalist(s)	Czechoslovakia	Totals:	63.90	110.80	174.70	63.35	105.85	169.20	72.35	199.60	216.65	416.25	62.80	65.95	445.45
2nd place, silver medalist(s)	Hungary	Edit Weckinger	8.40	14.50	22.90	7.95	14.05	22.00	9.35	25.70	28.55	54.25	63.75	60.1	440.55
2nd place, silver medalist(s)	Hungary	Mária Zalai-Kövi	8.00	14.35	22.35	7.80	14.35	22.15	8.90	24.70	28.70	53.40	63.75	60.1	440.55
2nd place, silver medalist(s)	Hungary	Irén Karcsics	8.70	14.45	23.15	7.30	14.10	21.40	8.70	24.70	28.55	53.25	63.75	60.1	440.55
2nd place, silver medalist(s)	Hungary	Erzsébet Gulyás-Köteles	8.00	14.30	22.30	7.35	14.15	21.50	8.45	23.80	28.45	52.25	63.75	60.1	440.55
2nd place, silver medalist(s)	Hungary	A. Sarkany	8.00	14.20	22.20	7.35	14.05	21.40	8.50	23.85	28.25	52.10	63.75	60.1	440.55
2nd place, silver medalist(s)	Hungary	Olga Tass	8.50	14.00	22.50	7.40	12.90	20.30	8.65	24.55	26.90	51.45	63.75	60.1	440.55
2nd place, silver medalist(s)	Hungary	Anna Fehér	8.10	13.95	22.05	6.45	12.90	19.35	7.75	22.30	26.85	~~49.15~~	63.75	60.1	440.55
2nd place, silver medalist(s)	Hungary	Margit Nagy-Sándor	8.45	14.15	22.60	7.45	-	7.45	9.05	24.95	14.15	~~39.10~~	63.75	60.1	440.55
2nd place, silver medalist(s)	Hungary	Totals:	66.15	113.9	180.05	59.05	96.5	115.55	69.35	194.55	210.40	404.95	63.75	60.1	440.55
3rd place, bronze medalist(s)	United States	Helen Schifano	8.70	14.00	22.70	8.20	13.15	21.35	7.65	24.55	27.15	51.70	-63.20	56.25	422.60
3rd place, bronze medalist(s)	United States	Clara Schroth	6.70	13.70	20.40	8.00	14.30	22.30	8.35	23.05	28.00	51.05	-63.20	56.25	422.60
3rd place, bronze medalist(s)	United States	Meta Elste	8.15	14.25	22.40	6.90	13.20	20.10	8.40	23.45	27.45	50.90	-63.20	56.25	422.60
3rd place, bronze medalist(s)	United States	Marian Barone	7.75	12.75	20.50	7.85	13.30	21.15	8.65	24.25	26.05	50.30	-63.20	56.25	422.60
3rd place, bronze medalist(s)	United States	Ladislava Bakanic	8.70	12.75	21.45	7.30	12.90	20.20	8.45	24.45	25.65	50.10	-63.20	56.25	422.60
3rd place, bronze medalist(s)	United States	Consetta Lenz	7.60	13.00	20.60	7.75	13.15	20.90	7.60	22.95	26.15	49.10	-63.20	56.25	422.60
3rd place, bronze medalist(s)	United States	Anita Simonis	6.40	13.35	19.75	7.65	12.60	20.25	7.80	21.85	25.95	~~47.80~~	-63.20	56.25	422.60
3rd place, bronze medalist(s)	United States	Dorothy Dalton	7.90	13.10	21.00	7.20	12.35	19.55	7.10	22.20	25.45	~~47.65~~	-63.20	56.25	422.60
3rd place, bronze medalist(s)	United States	Totals:	61.90	106.90	168.80	60.85	104.95	165.80	64.00	186.75	211.85	398.60	-63.20	56.25	422.60
4	Sweden	Karin Lindberg	8.20	12.90	21.10	8.75	14.45	23.20	8.40	25.35	27.35	52.70	63.90	50.70	417.95
4	Sweden	Kerstin Bohman	8.05	12.80	20.85	8.35	13.80	22.15	8.40	24.80	26.60	51.40	63.90	50.70	417.95
4	Sweden	Ingrid Sandahl	7.60	13.00	20.60	8.15	14.00	22.15	8.25	24.00	27.00	51.00	63.90	50.70	417.95
4	Sweden	Göta Pettersson	7.10	13.10	20.20	7.80	13.35	21.15	8.75	23.65	26.45	50.10	63.90	50.70	417.95
4	Sweden	Gunnel Johansson	8.15	12.35	20.50	8.20	13.80	22.00	6.60	22.95	26.15	49.10	63.90	50.70	417.95
4	Sweden	Märta Andersson	7.35	12.70	20.05	7.00	14.00	21.00	8.00	22.35	26.70	49.05	63.90	50.70	417.95
4	Sweden	Ingrid Andersson	7.20	12.10	19.30	7.00	13.75	20.75	7.05	21.25	25.85	~~47.10~~	63.90	50.70	417.95
4	Sweden	Stina Haage	5.35	11.95	17.50	-	14.10	14.10	7.70	13.05	26.05	~~39.10~~	63.90	50.70	417.95
4	Sweden	Totals:	59.00	100.90	159.90	55.25	111.25	166.50	63.15	177.40	212.15	389.55	63.90	50.70	417.95
5	Netherlands	Cootje van Kampen-Tonneman	8.10	13.70	21.80	7.80	13.90	21.70	9.00	24.90	27.60	52.50	61.55	61.55	408.35
5	Netherlands	Lenie Gerrietsen	7.85	13.00	20.85	8.05	13.30	21.35	7.30	23.20	26.30	49.50	61.55	61.55	408.35
5	Netherlands	Jacoba Wijnands	7.10	12.00	19.10	7.35	12.85	20.20	7.95	22.40	24.85	47.25	61.55	61.55	408.35
5	Netherlands	Annie Ros	7.10	11.25	18.35	7.30	11.90	19.20	8.20	22.60	23.15	45.75	61.55	61.55	408.35
5	Netherlands	Anna Maria van Geene	7.90	9.00	16.90	8.00	12.35	20.35	8.20	24.10	21.35	45.45	61.55	61.55	408.35
5	Netherlands	Klara Post	7.55	9.50	17.05	7.35	12.20	19.55	8.20	23.10	21.70	44.80	61.55	61.55	408.35
5	Netherlands	Truida Heil-Bonnet	-	11.95	11.95	8.4	13.25	21.65	8.95	17.35	25.20	~~42.55~~	61.55	61.55	408.35
5	Netherlands	Dientje Meijer-Haantjes	7.55	11.25	18.80	-	11.60	11.60	7.90	15.45	22.85	~~38.30~~	61.55	61.55	408.35
5	Netherlands	Totals:	53.15	91.65	144.80	54.25	101.35	155.60	65.70	173.10	193.00	366.10	61.55	61.55	408.35
6	Austria	Gerti Fesl	7.80	12.95	20.75	7.80	13.70	21.50	8.80	24.40	26.65	51.05	60.20	53.60	405.45
6	Austria	Gretchen Hehenberger	7.60	12.60	20.20	8.40	13.30	21.70	8.10	24.10	25.90	50.00	60.20	53.60	405.45
6	Austria	Trude Gollner-Kolar	5.75	13.40	19.15	7.40	14.05	21.45	8.05	21.20	27.45	48.65	60.20	53.60	405.45
6	Austria	Traudl Ruckser	7.15	12.50	19.65	7.80	13.40	21.20	7.50	22.45	25.90	48.35	60.20	53.60	405.45
6	Austria	Gertrude Gries	7.40	12.50	19.90	7.50	12.90	20.40	7.70	22.60	25.40	48.00	60.20	53.60	405.45
6	Austria	Gertrude Winnige-Barosch	7.60	12.65	20.25	6.85	11.20	18.05	7.30	21.75	23.85	45.60	60.20	53.60	405.45
6	Austria	Edeltraud Schramm	4.75	13.65	18.40	8.05	13.40	21.45	5.25	18.05	27.05	~~45.10~~	60.20	53.60	405.45
6	Austria	Erika Enzenhofer	0.25	12.75	13.00	7.75	13.10	20.85	5.10	13.10	25.85	~~38.95~~	60.20	53.60	405.45
6	Austria	Totals:	48.30	103.00	151.30	61.55	105.05	166.60	57.80	167.42	208.05	375.70	60.20	53.60	405.45
7	Yugoslavia	Vida Gerbec	7.25	13.45	20.70	7.15	12.85	20.00	8.30	22.70	26.30	49.00	61.30	57.70	397.90
7	Yugoslavia	Dragana Đorđević	7.35	12.15	19.50	7.55	12.90	20.45	7.65	22.55	25.05	47.60	61.30	57.70	397.90
7	Yugoslavia	Ruža Vojsk	6.60	13.05	19.65	7.45	12.60	20.05	7.50	21.55	25.65	47.20	61.30	57.70	397.90
7	Yugoslavia	Draginja Đipalović	7.55	12.90	20.45	7.65	12.35	20.00	6.70	21.90	25.25	47.15	61.30	57.70	397.90
7	Yugoslavia	Tanja Žutić	6.85	7.75	14.60	8.45	13.60	22.05	8.60	23.90	21.35	45.25	61.30	57.70	397.90
7	Yugoslavia	Dragica Basletić	5.15	11.60	16.75	6.80	11.50	18.30	7.65	19.60	23.10	42.70	61.30	57.70	397.90
7	Yugoslavia	Zlatica Mijatović	5.50	13.85	19.35	-	13.00	13.00	8.00	13.50	26.85	~~40.35~~	61.30	57.70	397.90
7	Yugoslavia	Neža Černe	5.95	11.00	16.95	-	-	-	7.75	13.70	11.00	~~24.70~~	61.30	57.70	397.90
7	Yugoslavia	Totals:	52.20	95.75	147.95	45.05	88.80	133.85	62.15	159.40	184.55	343.95	61.30	57.70	397.90
8	Italy	Laura Micheli	8.65	14.05	22.70	7.80	13.80	21.60	9.35	25.80	27.85	53.65	61.40	51.20	394.20
8	Italy	Elena Santoni	7.10	12.60	19.70	7.70	13.40	21.10	6.75	21.55	26.00	47.55	61.40	51.20	394.20
8	Italy	Licia Macchini	5.75	13.85	19.60	6.95	12.05	19.00	7.70	20.40	25.90	46.30	61.40	51.20	394.20
8	Italy	Wanda Nuti	5.65	12.30	17.95	7.25	12.40	19.65	8.15	21.05	24.70	45.75	61.40	51.20	394.20
8	Italy	Lilia Torriani	5.00	13.40	18.40	6.80	12.20	19.00	7.70	19.50	25.60	45.10	61.40	51.20	394.20
8	Italy	Renata Bianchi	6.55	13.15	19.70	6.05	11.70	17.75	5.80	18.40	24.85	43.25	61.40	51.20	394.20
8	Italy	Norma Icardi	7.65	12.80	20.45	-	13.10	13.10	7.15	14.80	25.90	~~40.70~~	61.40	51.20	394.20
8	Italy	Luciana Pezzoni	7.50	13.30	20.80	-	-	-	7.40	14.90	13.30	~~28.20~~	61.40	51.20	394.20
8	Italy	Totals:	53.85	105.45	159.30	42.55	88.65	131.20	60.00	156.40	194.10	350.50	61.40	51.20	394.20
9	Great Britain	Cissy Davies	8.25	13.35	21.60	8.05	12.65	20.70	7.60	23.90	26.90	49.90	60.10	46.95	392.95
9	Great Britain	Joan Airey	7.75	13.80	21.55	8.40	13.90	22.30	5.15	21.30	27.70	49.00	60.10	46.95	392.95
9	Great Britain	Pat Hirst	6.90	12.20	19.10	8.70	12.90	21.60	8.00	23.60	25.10	48.70	60.10	46.95	392.95
9	Great Britain	Pat Evans	7.25	12.60	19.85	7.35	12.00	19.35	7.75	22.35	24.60	46.95	60.10	46.95	392.95
9	Great Britain	Dorothy Hey	7.75	12.15	19.90	6.50	12.50	19.00	7.25	21.50	24.65	46.15	60.10	46.95	392.95
9	Great Britain	Audrey Rennard	5.80	10.75	16.55	7.90	12.70	20.60	8.05	21.75	23.45	45.20	60.10	46.95	392.95
9	Great Britain	Irene Hirst	3.40	11.40	14.80	7.90	12.40	20.30	8.50	19.80	23.80	~~43.60~~	60.10	46.95	392.95
9	Great Britain	Dorothy Smith	0.45	11.60	12.05	-	7.50	7.50	6.80	7.25	19.10	~~26.35~~	60.10	46.95	392.95
9	Great Britain	Totals:	47.55	97.85	145.40	54.80	96.55	151.35	59.10	161.45	194.40	355.85	60.10	46.95	392.95
10	France	Florence Vallée	7.30	13.25	20.55	7.65	13.20	20.85	7.40	22.35	26.45	48.80	56.30	48.20	384.65
10	France	Jeanine Touchard	6.30	13.70	20.00	7.65	12.95	20.60	7.10	21.05	26.65	47.70	56.30	48.20	384.65
10	France	Christine Palau	6.30	12.00	18.30	8.10	13.20	21.30	7.10	21.50	25.20	46.70	56.30	48.20	384.65
10	France	Gisèle Guibert	6.50	12.25	18.75	7.55	13.10	20.65	7.25	21.30	25.35	46.65	56.30	48.20	384.65
10	France	Colette Hué	5.90	12.70	18.60	7.90	13.95	21.85	6.00	19.80	26.65	46.45	56.30	48.20	384.65
10	France	Monique Yvinou	3.65	13.60	17.25	7.90	13.25	21.15	5.45	17.00	26.85	43.85	56.30	48.20	384.65
10	France	Irène Pittelioen	4.65	13.40	18.05	5.65	13.40	19.05	5.00	15.30	26.80	~~42.10~~	56.30	48.20	384.65
10	France	Jeanette Vogelbacher	1.10	13.05	14.15	7.60	13.10	20.70	6.55	15.25	26.15	~~41.40~~	56.30	48.20	384.65
10	France	Totals:	41.70	103.95	145.65	60.00	106.15	166.15	51.85	153.55	210.10	363.65	56.30	48.20	384.65
11	Belgium	Albertine Van Roy-Moens	6.40	13.60	20.00	7.20	13.80	21.00	7.75	21.35	27.40	48.75	57.45	54.30	353.60
11	Belgium	Denise Parmentiers	3.60	11.25	14.85	6.55	11.75	18.30	7.40	17.55	23.00	40.55	57.45	54.30	353.60
11	Belgium	Yvonne Van Bets	3.80	10.10	13.90	7.30	12.35	19.65	6.15	17.25	22.45	39.70	57.45	54.30	353.60
11	Belgium	Jenny Schumacher	5.55	13.30	18.85	-	12.45	12.45	7.15	12.70	25.75	38.45	57.45	54.30	353.60
11	Belgium	Caroline Verbraecken-De Loose	5.80	12.65	18.45	-	12.55	12.55	7.20	13.00	25.20	38.20	57.45	54.30	353.60
11	Belgium	Thérèse De Grijze	1.35	9.10	10.45	6.50	12.30	18.80	6.95	14.80	21.40	36.20	57.45	54.30	353.60
11	Belgium	Anna Jordaens	5.95	-	5.95	5.85	11.50	17.35	6.40	18.20	11.50	~~29.70~~	57.45	54.30	353.60
11	Belgium	Julienne Boudewijns	0.25	10.25	10.50	-	10.35	10.35	7.05	7.30	20.60	~~27.90~~	57.45	54.30	353.60
11	Belgium	Totals:	32.70	80.25	112.95	33.40	97.05	130.45	56.05	122.15	177.30	299.45	57.45	54.30	353.60

== See also ==
- Olympic and Paralympic deaths
