= Sweden women's national artistic gymnastics team =

National sports team

Sweden
- Continental union: European Union of Gymnastics

Olympic Games
- Appearances: 5

World Championships
- Medals: Gold: 1950

The Sweden women's national artistic gymnastics team represents Sweden in FIG international competitions.

== History ==
Sweden made their Olympic debut in 1948, in which they placed 4th as a team. At the 1952 Olympic Games they won gold in the Team Portable Apparatus.

== Team competition results ==
=== Olympic Games ===
- 1948 — 4th place
  Karin Lindberg, Kerstin Bohman, Ingrid Sandahl, Göta Pettersson, Gunnel Johansson, Märta Andersson, Ingrid Andersson, Stina Haage
- 1952 — 4th place
  Karin Lindberg, Gun Röring, Evy Berggren, Göta Pettersson, Ann-Sofi Pettersson-Colling, Ingrid Sandahl, Hjördis Nordin, Vanja Blomberg
- 1956 — 8th place
  Evy Berggren, Doris Hedberg, Maude Karlén, Karin Lindberg, Ann-Sofi Pettersson-Colling, Eva Rönström
- 1960 — 11th place
  Lena Adler, Solveig Egman-Andersson, Monica Elfvin, Gerola Lindahl, Ulla Lindström, Ewa Rydell
- 1964 — 8th place
  Marie Lundqvist-Björk, Solveig Egman-Andersson, Ewa Rydell, Ulla Lindström, Anne-Marie Lambert, Gerola Lindahl

=== World Championships ===
- 1950 – gold medal
  Evy Berggren, Vanja Blomberg, Karin Lindberg, Gunnel Ljungström, Hjördis Nordin, Ann-Sofi Pettersson, Göta Pettersson, Ingrid Sandahl
- 1954 – 8th place
- 1958 – 11th place
- 1962 – 10th place
- 1966 – 9th place
- 2022 – 18th place (qualifications)
  Alva Eriksson, Malva Lundqvist Wingren, Tonya Paulsson, Emelie Westlund, Nathalie Westlund
- 2023 – 18th place (qualifications)
  Alva Eriksson, Elina Grawin, Tonya Paulsson, Emelie Westlund, Jennifer Williams

== Senior roster ==
Name	Birth date and age	Club
Alva Eriksson	March 3, 2001 (age 25)	Stockholm Top Gymnastics
Elina Grawin	January 25, 2007 (age 19)	Eskilstuna Gymnastikförening
Nora Hangelt	May 12, 2003 (age 23)	GK Motus Salto
Maya Ståhl	January 1, 2002 (age 24)	Tidaholm GS
Emelie Westlund	August 29, 2005 (age 21)	Eskilstuna Gymnastikförening
Nathalie Westlund	August 29, 2005 (age 21)	Eskilstuna Gymnastikförening
Jennifer Williams	October 11, 2005 (age 21)	Eskilstuna Gymnastikförening

== Most decorated gymnasts ==
This list includes all Swedish female artistic gymnasts who have won a medal at the Olympic Games or the World Artistic Gymnastics Championships. Medals won in the Team Portable Apparatus at the 1952 or 1956 Olympic Games are located under the Team column and are designated with an asterisk (*).

Rank	Gymnast	Team	AA	VT	UB	BB	FX	Olympic Total	World Total	Total
1	Ann-Sofi Pettersson	1952*; 1956*; 1950	1950	1956; 1954	1950			3	4	7
2	Evy Berggren	1952*; 1956*; 1950		1954				3	1	4
3	Karin Lindberg	1952*; 1956*; 1950						2	1	3
4	Ingrid Sandahl	1952*; 1950						1	1	2
4	Vanja Blomberg	1952*; 1950						1	1	2
4	Hjördis Nordin	1952*; 1950						1	1	2
4	Göta Pettersson	1952*; 1950						1	1	2
8	Gun Röring	1952*						1	0	1
9	Doris Hedberg	1956*						1	0	1
9	Maude Karlén	1956*						1	0	1
9	Eva Rönström	1956*						1	0	1
