= Belgium women's national artistic gymnastics team =

National sports team

Belgium
- Continental union: European Union of Gymnastics
- National federation: Royal Belgian Gymnastics Federation

Olympic Games
- Appearances: 3

The Belgium women's national artistic gymnastics team represents Belgium in FIG international competitions.

== History ==
Belgium has participated in the Olympic Games women's team competition thrice: in 1948, 2016, and 2020. At the 2020 Olympic Games Nina Derwael became Belgium's first Olympic medalist in women's artistic gymnastics, winning gold on the uneven bars.

== Current senior roster ==
Name	Birthdate and age	Gym
Chloé Baert	April 10, 2008 (age 18)	Topsportschool Gent
Hanna Degryse	July 8, 2008 (age 18)	Topsportschool Gent
Naomi Descamps	May 2, 2008 (age 18)	Mons High Level
Yelena Devreker	May 6, 2008 (age 18)	Topsportschool Gent
Aberdeen O'Driscoll	January 1, 2007 (age 19)	University of Georgia
Erika Pinxten	May 5, 2007 (age 19)	Topsportschool Gent
Ylea Tollet	October 17, 2004 (age 22)	Topsportschool Gent
Lisa Vaelen	August 10, 2004 (age 22)	Topsportschool Gent
Jade Vansteenkiste	July 17, 2003 (age 23)	Topsportschool Gent
Mika Webster-Longin	January 1, 2006 (age 20)	University of California, Los Angeles

== Team competition results ==
=== Olympic Games ===
- 1948 — 11th place
  Albertine Van Roy-Moens, Denise Parmentiers, Yvonne Van Bets, Jenny Schumacher, Caroline Verbraecken-De Loose, Thérèse De Grijze, Anna Jordaens, Julienne Boudewijns
- 2016 – 12th place
  Nina Derwael, Rune Hermans, Gaëlle Mys, Laura Waem, Senna Deriks
- 2020 – 8th place
  Maellyse Brassart, Nina Derwael, Lisa Vaelen, Jutta Verkest

== Most decorated gymnasts ==
This list includes all Belgian female artistic gymnasts who have won a medal at the Olympic Games or the World Artistic Gymnastics Championships.

Rank	Gymnast	Team	AA	VT	UB	BB	FX	Olympic Total	World Total	Total
1	Nina Derwael				2020; 2018; 2019; 2017; 2022			1	4	5
