= Belgium at the 1948 Summer Olympics =

- IOC code: BEL
- NOC: Belgian Olympic Committee

in London
- Competitors: 152 (132 men, 20 women) in 17 sports
- Flag bearer: Charles Vyt
- Medals Ranked 15th: Gold 2 Silver 2 Bronze 3 Total 7

Summer Olympics appearances (overview)
- 1900; 1904; 1908; 1912; 1920; 1924; 1928; 1932; 1936; 1948; 1952; 1956; 1960; 1964; 1968; 1972; 1976; 1980; 1984; 1988; 1992; 1996; 2000; 2004; 2008; 2012; 2016; 2020; 2024; 2028

Other related appearances
- 1906 Intercalated Games

Belgium competed at the 1948 Summer Olympics in London, England. 152 competitors, 132 men and 20 women, took part in 77 events in 17 sports.

== Medalists ==
=== Gold ===
- Gaston Reiff — Athletics, Men's 5.000 metres
- Léon Delathouwer, Eugène van Roosbroeck and Lode Wouters — Cycling, Men's Team Road Race

=== Silver ===
- Pierre Nihant — Cycling, Men's 1.000 metres Time Trial
- Joseph Vissers — Boxing, Men's Lightweight

=== Bronze ===
- Etienne Gailly — Athletics, Men's Marathon
- Lode Wouters — Cycling, Men's Individual Road Race
- Paul Valcke, André van de Werve de Vorsselaer, Georges de Bourguignon, Raymond Bru, Edouard Yves, and Henri Paternoster — Fencing, Men's Foil Team Competition

== Basketball ==
Men's Team Competition

- Preliminary Round (Group B)
  - Lost to South Korea (27-29)
  - Lost to China (34-44)
  - Defeated Iraq (98-20)
  - Defeated Chile (38-36)
  - Defeated Philippines (37-35)
- Classification Matches
  - 9th/16th place: Defeated Hungary (walk-over)
  - 9th/12th place: Lost to Canada (40-45)
  - 11th/12th place: Defeated Philippines (38-34) → Eleventh place

== Cycling ==
Twelve cyclists, all men, represented Belgium in 1948.

Individual road race

- Lode Wouters
- Leon De Lathouwer
- Eugène Van Roosbroeck
- Liévin Lerno

Team road race

- Lode Wouters
- Leon De Lathouwer
- Eugène Van Roosbroeck
- Liévin Lerno

Sprint

- Ward Van de Velde

Time trial

- Pierre Nihant

Tandem

- Louis Van Schil
- Roger De Pauw

Team pursuit

- Jos De Beuckelaer
- Maurice Blomme
- Georges Vanbrabant
- Raphael Glorieux

== Fencing ==
18 fencers, 15 men and 3 women, represented Belgium in 1948.

Men's foil

- Paul Valcke
- Henri Paternóster
- André Van De Werve De Vorsselaer

Men's team foil

- Georges de Bourguignon, Henri Paternóster, Édouard Yves, Raymond Bru, André Van De Werve De Vorsselaer, Paul Valcke

Men's épée

- Jean-Marie Radoux
- Charles Debeur
- Raoul Henkart

Men's team épée

- Raymond Stasse, Léopold Hauben, Raymond Bru, Jean-Marie Radoux, Raoul Henkart, Charles Debeur

Men's team sabre

- Robert Bayot, Georges de Bourguignon, Ferdinand Jassogne, Eugène Laermans, Marcel Nys, Édouard Yves

Women's foil

- Jenny Addams
- Adèle Christiaens
- Emilie Schwindt

== Gymnastics ==
8 gymnasts, all female, represented Belgium in 1948.

Women's team

- Julienne Boudewijns
- Thérèse De Grijze
- Anna Jordaens
- Denise Parmentiers
- Jenny Schumacher
- Yvonne Van Bets
- Albertine Van Roy-Moens
- Caroline Verbraecken-De Loose

== Modern pentathlon ==
Three male pentathletes represented Belgium in 1948.

- Louis Fauconnier
- Charles Vyt
- Raoul Mollet

== Rowing ==
Belgium had four male rowers participate in two out of seven rowing events in 1948.

Men's double sculls

- Ben Piessens
- Willy Collet

Men's coxless pair

- Charles Van Antwerpen
- Jos Rosa

== Shooting ==
Three shooters represented Belgium in 1948.

50 metre pistol

- Marcel Lafortune

50 metre rifle

- Jacques Lafortune
- Jacques Delval
- Marcel Lafortune

== Swimming ==
Men

Athlete	Event	Heat		Semifinal		Final	
Athlete	Event	Time	Rank	Time	Rank	Time	Rank
Joseph Reynders	1500 m freestyle	21:23.1	9	Did not advance			

Women

Athlete	Event	Heat		Semifinal		Final	
Athlete	Event	Time	Rank	Time	Rank	Time	Rank
Fernande Caroen	100 m freestyle	1:12.1	4	Did not advance			
Fernande Caroen	400 m freestyle	5:29.2	2 Q	5:26.1	2 Q	5:25.3	4
Yvonne Vandekerckhove	200 m breaststroke	3:09.0	3 Q*	3:09.7	4*	Did not advance	
Maria Huybrechts; Maria Oeyen; Maria Van Den Brande; Fernande Caroen	4 × 100 metre freestyle relay	4:54.9	5*	—N/a		Did not advance	

*Ranks given are within the heat.
