= Gymnastics at the 1948 Summer Olympics =

Coordinates: 51.5556°N 0.2797°W

Gymnastics at the Games of the XIV Olympiad
- Venue: Empress Hall
- Dates: 7–14 August 1948

At the 1948 Summer Olympics in London, nine events in gymnastics were contested. Finland led all nations with six gold medals and ten medals overall.

Shortly after the Czechoslovak team arrived in London, 22 year old team member Eliška Misáková was taken ill and confined to an iron lung. She died of infantile paralysis on the same day that her teammates competed. When the Czechoslovak flag was raised at the medal ceremony, it was bordered with a black ribbon.

== Medal table ==
Rank	Nation	Gold	Silver	Bronze	Total
1	Finland	6	2	2	10
2	Switzerland	3	4	2	9
3	Hungary	1	2	3	6
4	Czechoslovakia	1	0	3	4
5	United States	0	0	1	1
Totals (5 entries)		11	8	11	30

=== Men's events ===
Games	Gold	Silver	Bronze
individual all-round	Veikko Huhtanen; Finland	Walter Lehmann; Switzerland	Paavo Aaltonen; Finland
team all-around	Finland; Paavo Aaltonen; Veikko Huhtanen; Kalevi Laitinen; Olavi Rove; Aleksanteri Saarvala; Sulo Salmi; Heikki Savolainen; Einari Teräsvirta	Switzerland; Karl Frei; Christian Kipfer; Walter Lehmann; Robert Lucy; Michael Reusch; Josef Stalder; Emil Studer; Melchior Thalmann	Hungary; László Baranyai; Jozsef Fekete; Gyözö Mogyorosi; János Mogyorósi-Klencs; Ferenc Pataki; Lajos Sántha; Lajos Tóth; Ferenc Várkõi
floor exercises	Ferenc Pataki; Hungary	János Mogyorósi-Klencs; Hungary	Zdeněk Růžička; Czechoslovakia
horizontal bar	Josef Stalder; Switzerland	Walter Lehmann; Switzerland	Veikko Huhtanen; Finland
parallel bars	Michael Reusch; Switzerland	Veikko Huhtanen; Finland	Josef Stalder; Switzerland
parallel bars	Michael Reusch; Switzerland	Veikko Huhtanen; Finland	Christian Kipfer; Switzerland
pommel horse	Paavo Aaltonen; Finland	none awarded ^{[A]}	none awarded ^{[A]}
pommel horse	Veikko Huhtanen; Finland	none awarded ^{[A]}	none awarded ^{[A]}
pommel horse	Heikki Savolainen; Finland	none awarded ^{[A]}	none awarded ^{[A]}
rings	Karl Frei; Switzerland	Michael Reusch; Switzerland	Zdeněk Růžička; Czechoslovakia
vault	Paavo Aaltonen; Finland	Olavi Rove; Finland	János Mogyorósi-Klencs; Hungary
vault	Paavo Aaltonen; Finland	Olavi Rove; Finland	Ferenc Pataki; Hungary
vault	Paavo Aaltonen; Finland	Olavi Rove; Finland	Leo Sotorník; Czechoslovakia

=== Women's events ===
Games	Gold	Silver	Bronze
team all-around	Czechoslovakia; Zdeňka Honsová; Marie Kovářová; Miloslava Misáková; Milena Müllerová; Věra Růžičková; Olga Šilhánová; Božena Srncová; Zdeňka Veřmiřovská	Hungary; Edit Weckinger; Mária Zalai-Kövi; Irén Karcsics; Erzsébet Gulyás-Köteles; Erzsébet Balázs; Olga Tass; Anna Fehér; Margit Nagy-Sándor	United States; Ladislava Bakanic; Marian Barone; Consetta Lenz; Dorothy Dalton; Meta Elste; Helen Schifano; Clara Schroth; Anita Simonis
Individual all-around†	Zdeňka Honsová; Czechoslovakia	Edit Weckinger; Hungary; Laura Micheli; Italy	n/a
Vault†	Karin Lindberg; Sweden	Joan Airey; Great Britain; Clara Schroth; United States	n/a
Balance Beam†	Zdeňka Honsová; Czechoslovakia	Irén Karcsics; Hungary; Miloslava Misáková; Czechoslovakia	n/a
Flying Rings†, †††	Zdeňka Honsová; Czechoslovakia	Edit Weckinger; Hungary; Laura Micheli; Italy	n/a
Floor Exercise†, ††††	n/a	n/a	n/a
Uneven Bars†, ††	n/a	n/a	n/a

† Within the sport of artistic gymnastics, although men were recognized with individual medals at the time, the women weren’t. The list of the individual medalists within this table reflects the individuals who garnered a top-three placement in the team competition on the respective apparatus (or all 3 combined, in the case of the all-around) and who would have been awarded a medal with the rules that commenced with the 1952 Helsinki Summer Olympic Games and that would change periodically at future Olympic Games with respect to the debut of individual finals competitions at the 1972 Munich Summer Olympics and with respect to the New Life rules that made their Olympic debut at the 1992 Barcelona Summer Olympics.

†† Women did not compete on the Uneven Bars apparatus during these Olympic Games.

††† This was the only time that women gymnasts competed on this apparatus at an Olympic Games.

†††† Women’s Floor Exercise was not an event that existed at the time.

== Participating nations ==
- Argentina (7)
- Austria (16)
- Belgium (8)
- Cuba (7)
- Czechoslovakia (16)
- Denmark (8)
- Egypt (8)
- Finland (8)
- France (16)
- Great Britain (16)
- Hungary (16)
- Italy (16)
- Luxembourg (8)
- Mexico (5)
- Netherlands (8)
- Sweden (8)
- Switzerland (8)
- United States (16)
- Yugoslavia (16)

== Notes ==
^[A] Other sources claim that Luigi Zanetti (Italy) also won a silver medal and Guido Figone (Italy) also won a bronze medal in the pommel horse event, despite the three gold medals awarded for the three-way first place tie.
