= Ruza =

Ruza or Ruža may refer to:

== People ==
- Ruža, a South Slavic feminine name (includes a list of people with the name)
- Marty Ruza, an American jewelry and accessories designer who won a Coty Award in 1970
- Ruza Wenclawska (died 1977), American suffragette

== Places ==
- Ruza Urban Settlement, a municipal formation into which the Town of Ruza, Ruzsky District, Moscow Oblast, Russia is incorporated
- Ruza (inhabited locality), several inhabited localities in Moscow Oblast, Russia
- Ruza (river), a river in Moscow Oblast, Russia

== See also ==
- Ružica (disambiguation)
