= Clara Schroth =

American gymnast

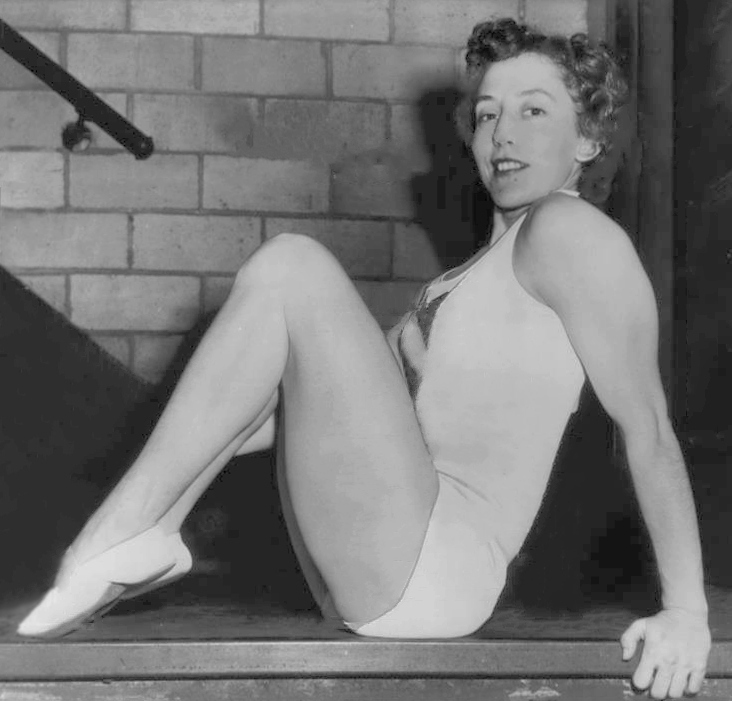
- Schroth in 1948

Personal information
- Born: October 5, 1920 Philadelphia, Pennsylvania, U.S
- Died: June 7, 2014 (aged 93) Carlisle, Pennsylvania, U.S.

Sport
- Sport: Artistic gymnastics
- Club: Philadelphia Turners
Medal record
Representing United States
Olympic Games
Bronze medal – third place	1948 London	Team

Clara Marie Schroth-Lomady (October 5, 1920 – June 7, 2014) was an American artistic gymnast who won a team bronze medal at the 1948 Summer Olympics. She also competed at the 1952 Summer Olympics in Helsinki. Although individual medals had been awarded to male gymnasts since the inception of the modern Olympic Games in 1896, women would not be awarded with individual medals until 1952; however, under the rules that began in 1952, Schroth's performance in 1948 would have garnered her an individual medal of second-place silver on vault (referred to in the Official Olympic Report as the "Pommeled Horse"), tied with Joan Airey of the United Kingdom, as Schroth had the 2nd-highest score on the apparatus of 80+ athletes in the competition.

At the national level she won 39 Amateur Athletic Union titles, including eleven straight victories on the balance beam and several that were attained after she had her first child. Schroth was also an accomplished track and field athlete, winning the 1945 USA Indoor Track and Field Championships in the standing long jump and placing 2nd at the corresponding outdoor meet. She is the first person to win six national all-around titles from 1945-6 and 1949–52, a record that stood for nearly 70 years until it was beaten by Simone Biles.

Along with other USA woman gymnasts Meta Elste-Neumann, Helen Schifano-Sjursen, and Erna Wachtel, Schroth-Lomady was inducted into the USA Gymnastics Hall of Fame in 1974, the first year that the Hall of Fame, which inducted its inaugural class in 1959 and had inducted 65 individuals by 1974, included women amongst its inductees.

While competing Schroth worked as a secretary for the Abington School District. In 1951 she married Wendell "Fuzz" Lomady and became a housewife, yet she remained active with the U.S. Gymnastics Federation. She died on June 7, 2014, in her home in Carlisle, Pennsylvania, at the age of 93.
