= Eliška Misáková =

Czech gymnast

Olympic medal record

Women's gymnastics

Representing Czechoslovakia
Gold medal – first place	1948 London	Team (awarded posthumously)

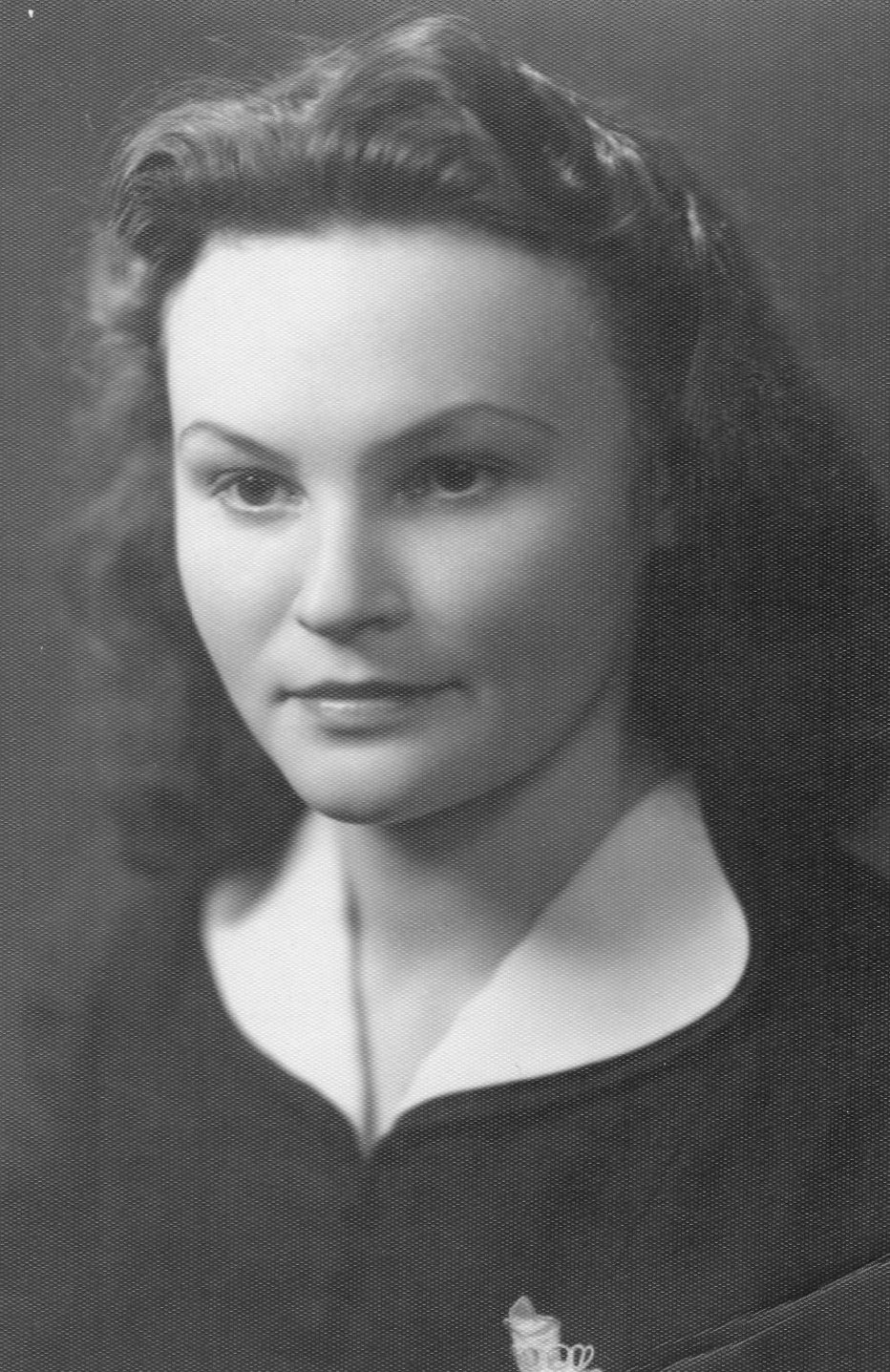
Eliška Misáková

Eliška Misáková (12 October 1925 in Kojetice – 14 August 1948 in London) was a Czech gymnast who was selected to attend the 1948 Summer Olympics.

Misáková was born in Kojetice, in the Třebíč District of Vysočina. Her parents both died before her in 1948. She was diagnosed with poliomyelitis soon after arrival in London, and isolated in a local hospital ward, with access to an iron lung. Her place on the team was taken by Věra Růžičková.

Misáková died during the competition, after four days in the Uxbridge Isolation Hospital. The Czechoslovak team, including her sister Miloslava, went on to earn the gold medal. Their flag was raised at the medal ceremony with a black border of mourning, and Misáková became the only athlete to ever be awarded a posthumous Olympic medal. Because of the infectious nature of her illness, her body was cremated before repatriation and her ashes returned to Prague in an urn.
