= Ingrid Andersson =

Ingrid Andersson may refer to:

- Ingrid Andersson (gymnast) (1924–2005), Swedish gymnast
- Ingrid Andersson (author) (1918–1994), Swedish author
