= Ružica =

Ružica ("little Ruža") may refer to:

- Ružica (given name)
- Ružica Church in the Belgrade Fortress
- Ružica, the old name for Gnjilane

== See also ==
- Różyczka (disambiguation)
- Ruža (disambiguation)
