= Różyczka =

Różyczka may refer to:

- Little Rose (Polish: Różyczka), 2010 Polish drama film
- Różyczka, Greater Poland Voivodeship, village in Poland

== See also ==
- Ružica (disambiguation)
