= Zdeňka Honsová =

Czech gymnast (1927–1994)

- Zdeňka Honsová, from the Official 1948 Summer Olympics Report

Personal information
- Born: 3 July 1927 Jihlava, Czechoslovakia
- Died: 16 May 1994 (aged 66)

Gymnastics career
- Discipline: Women's artistic gymnastics
- Country represented: Czechoslovakia
Medal record
Representing Czechoslovakia
Olympic Games
Gold medal – first place	1948 London	Team

Zdeňka Honsová (3 July 1927 – 16 May 1994) was a Czech gymnast who competed in the 1948 Summer Olympics.

== Biography ==
Honsová was the highest women's gymnastics individual all-around scorer at these Olympics, continuing the legacy of major-games-all-around-first-place-winning established by her Czechoslovak compatriate, the sport's first-ever women's World All-Around Champion and twice-first-place-finisher in the combined individual standings, Vlasta Děkanová, and continued later by another of her Czechoslovak compatriates, two-time Olympic All-Around Champion Věra Čáslavská.

At the 1948 Olympic games, Honsová finished in 1st place in the individual total combined standings, the individual compulsory exercise combined standings, Flying rings, and balance beam (combined compulsory and voluntary score). She was also the 2nd-place finisher on compulsory beam (behind her teammate Božena Srncová), and the 4th-place finisher on compulsory vault.

Honsová is not officially recognized as being an Olympic All-Around Champion because individual medals were not awarded to women gymnasts at the Olympic games until 1952.
