= Elena Santoni =

Italian gymnast (1930–2022)

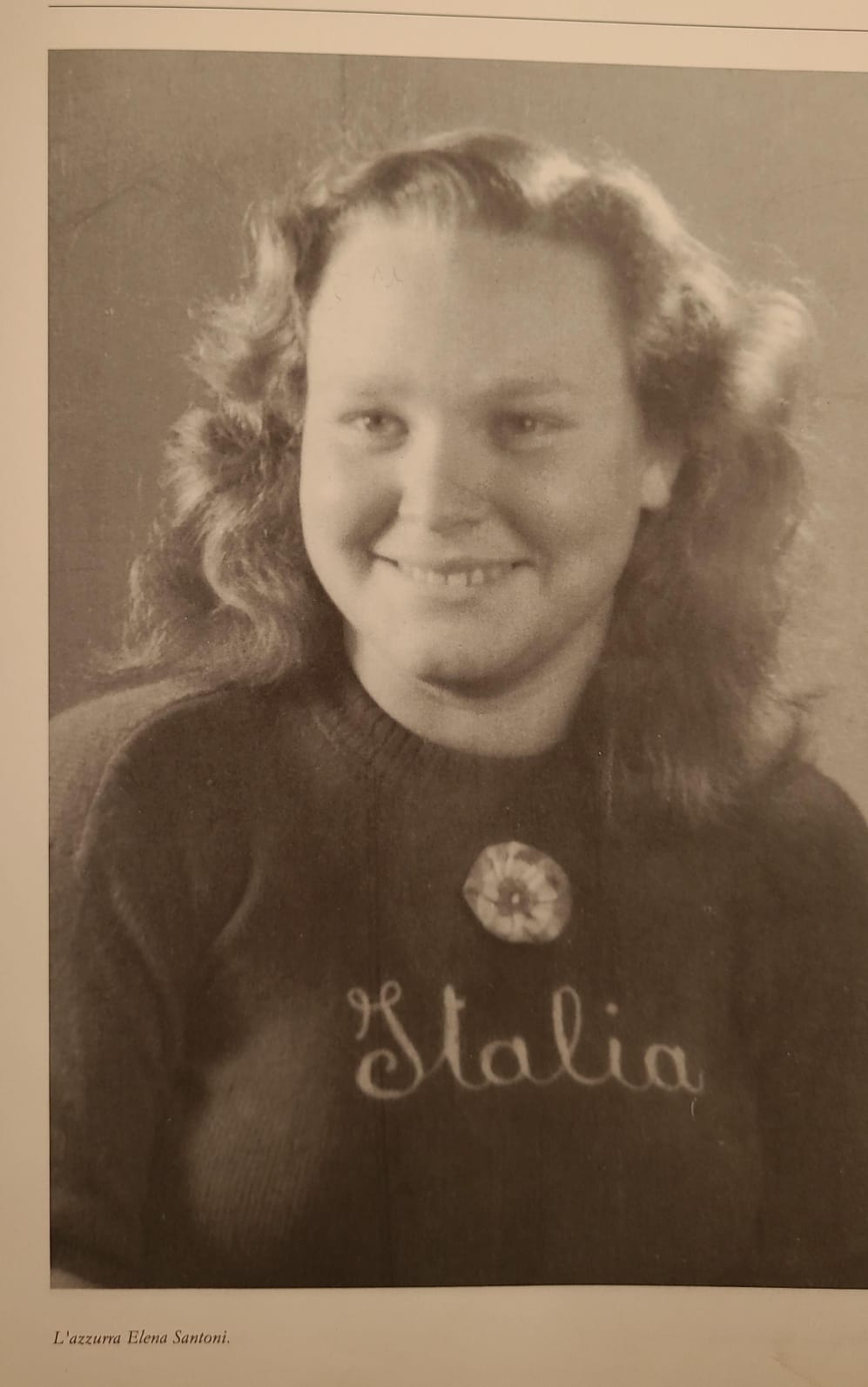

Personal information
- Nationality: Italian
- Born: 30 April 1930 Nereto, Kingdom of Italy
- Died: 30 November 2022 (aged 92) Tortoreto, Italy

Sport
- Sport: Gymnastics

Elena Santoni (30 April 1930 – 30 November 2022) was an Italian gymnast. She competed in the women's artistic team all-around at the 1948 Summer Olympics.
