= Dorothy Hey =

British gymnast (1931–2015)

Personal information
- Nationality: British
- Born: 1931 Bradford, England
- Died: 9 September 2015 (aged 83–84) Bradford, England

Sport
- Sport: Gymnastics

Dorothy Hey (1931 – 9 September 2015) was a British gymnast. She competed in the women's artistic team all-around at the 1948 Summer Olympics.
