= Ruza (inhabited locality) =

Ruza (Russian: Руза) is the name of several inhabited localities in Moscow Oblast, Russia:

== Urban localities ==
- Ruza, Ruzsky District, Moscow Oblast, a town in Ruzsky District

== Rural localities ==
- Ruza, Volokolamsky District, Moscow Oblast, a village in Ostashevskoye Rural Settlement of Volokolamsky District
