= Christine Palau =

French gymnast

Personal information
- Nationality: French
- Born: 11 June 1930; Paris, France
- Died: 26 November 2014 (aged 84); Cervens, France

Sport
- Sport: Gymnastics

Christine Palau (11 June 1930 – 26 November 2014) was a French gymnast. She competed in the women's artistic team all-around at the 1948 Summer Olympics.
