= Gun Röring =

Swedish gymnast

Medal record

Women's gymnastics

Olympic Games
Gold medal – first place	1952 Helsinki	Team portable apparatus

Gun Röring (17 June 1930 – 17 March 2006) was a Swedish gymnast and Olympic champion.

Röring competed at the 1952 Summer Olympics in Helsinki where she received a gold medal in Team portable apparatus.
