= Ruža =

Ruža is a South Slavic feminine given name, cognate of the name Rose. Its diminutive form is Ružica. It may refer to:

- Ruža Pospiš-Baldani, Croatian opera singer
- Ruža Tomašić, Croatian politician
- Ruža Petrović, Croatian anti-fascist
- Ruža Vojsk, a Slovenian former gymnast

== See also ==
- Ružica (given name), diminutive form
