= Zdeněk Růžička =

Czech gymnast (1925–2021)

Personal information
- Born: 15 April 1925 Ivančice, Czechoslovakia
- Died: 18 April 2021 (aged 96) Brno, Czech Republic

Gymnastics career
- Discipline: Men's artistic gymnastics
- Country represented: Czechoslovakia
Medal record
Olympic Games
Representing Czechoslovakia
Bronze medal – third place	1948 London	Floor
Bronze medal – third place	1948 London	Rings

Zdeněk Růžička (15 April 1925 – 18 April 2021) was a Czech gymnast who was a three-time Olympian. Winning two individual bronze medals on floor exercise and rings at the Gymnastics at the 1948 Summer Olympics where he also placed 7th in the combined individual all-around standings, he continued to compete at the next two Olympiads where his best results were top-15 placements on pommel horse and rings in 1952 and a top-10 finish on the horizontal bar in 1956. He was born in Ivančice. He died on 18 April 2021 at the age of 96.
