= Mokrá-Horákov =

- Municipality
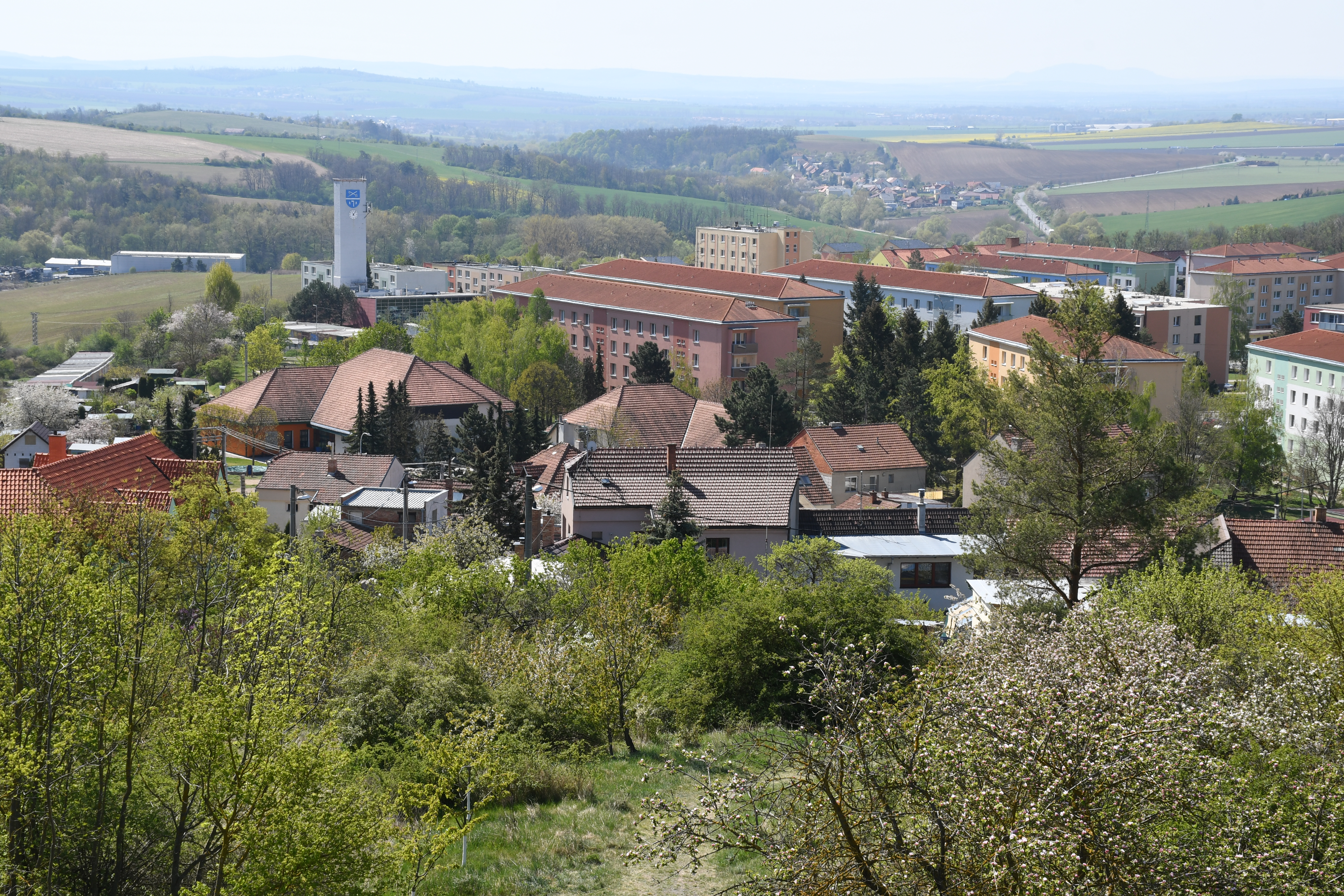
- View of Mokrá from the east

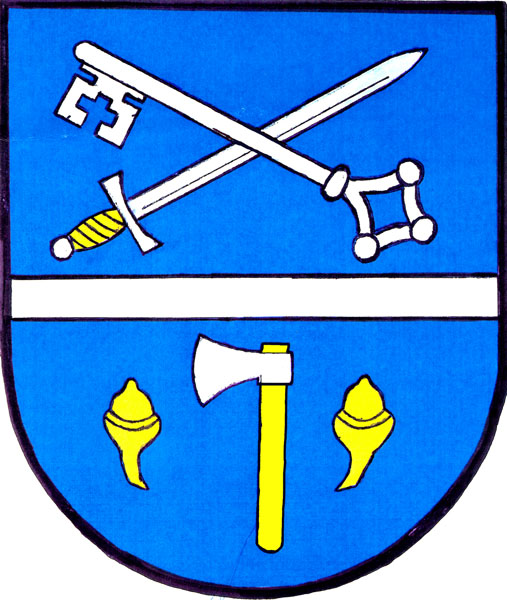
- Flag Coat of arms

- Location in the Czech Republic
- Coordinates: 49°13′23″N 16°45′5″E
- Country: Czech Republic
- Region: South Moravian
- District: Brno-Country
- First mentioned: 1350

Area
  - Total: 12.16 km^{2} (4.70 sq mi)
- Elevation: 330 m (1,080 ft)

Population (2026-01-01)
  - Total: 2,897
  - Density: 238.2/km^{2} (617.0/sq mi)
- Time zone: UTC+1 (CET)
  - Summer (DST): UTC+2 (CEST)
- Postal code: 664 04
- Website: www.mokra-horakov.cz

Mokrá-Horákov is a municipality in Brno-Country District in the South Moravian Region of the Czech Republic. It has about 2,900 inhabitants.

== Administrative division ==
Mokrá-Horákov consists of two municipal parts (in brackets population according to the 2021 census):

- Mokrá (1,794)
- Horákov (910)

== Geography ==
Mokrá-Horákov is located about 8 kilometres (5 mi) east of Brno. The villages of Mokrá and Horákov are urbanistically fused. The municipality lies in the Drahany Highlands. The highest point is at 430 m (1,411 ft) above sea level. The Říčka Stream flows along the western municipal border.

The northern part of the municipality extends into the Moravian Karst Protected Landscape Area. The area along the Říčka Stream within the Moravian Karst is rich in cave systems and is protected as Údolí Říčky Nature Reserve.

== History ==
The first written mention of Mokrá is from 1350. From the end of the 14th century until the establishment of a sovereign municipality in 1848, Mokrá was owned by the Royal Capital Chapter of Saints Peter and Paul in Brno.

Horákov was first mentioned in 1371. Horákov was at first a small independent estate. In 1533, it was annexed to the Kobylnice estate. Later it became part of the Sokolnice estate, owned by the Mitrovský family.

On 26 July 1976, the municipalities of Mokrá and Horákov were merged.

== Demographics ==
Historical population

Year	Pop.	±%
1869	863	—
1880	806	−6.6%
1890	996	+23.6%
1900	1,173	+17.8%
1910	1,382	+17.8%

Year	Pop.	±%
1921	1,318	−4.6%
1930	1,409	+6.9%
1950	1,425	+1.1%
1961	1,467	+2.9%
1970	2,226	+51.7%

Year	Pop.	±%
1980	2,895	+30.1%
1991	2,662	−8.0%
2001	2,587	−2.8%
2011	2,761	+6.7%
2021	2,704	−2.1%

Source: Censuses

== Economy ==
Mokrá is known for a stone quarry and for one of the two plants of the largest cement producer in the country, Heidelberg Materials.

== Transport ==
There are no railways or major roads passing through the municipality.

== Sights ==
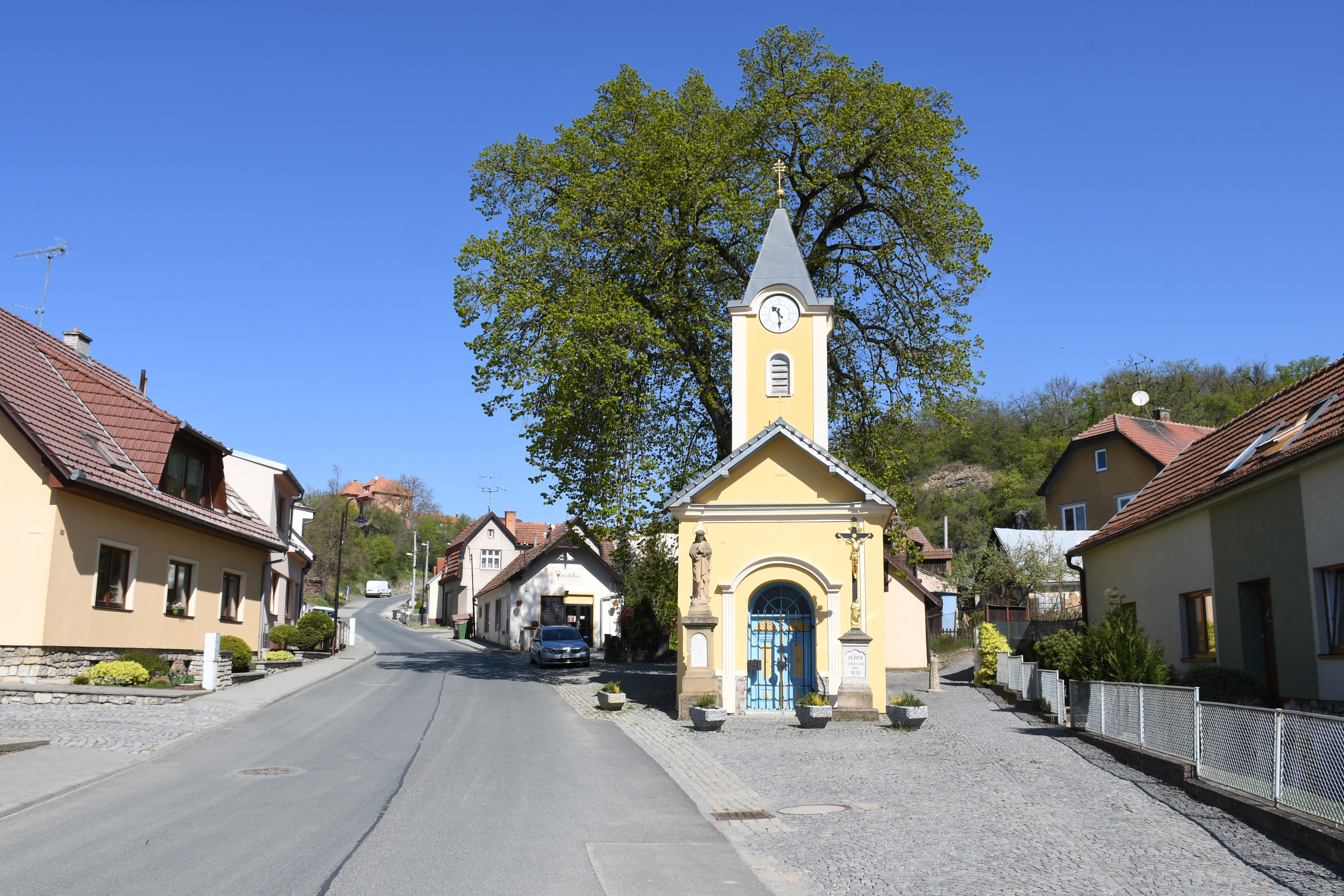
Chapel of the Transfiguration

The main historical monument in Mokrá is the Chapel of Saint Barbara. It is a small Neoclassical building dating from after 1800. The second chapel in Mokrá is the Chapel of the Transfiguration, but it is not a protected cultural monument.

In Horákov is the Chapel of Saint Gotthard. It was built in 1898 and it is the main landmark of the village centre.

The most notable cave in the territory of Mokrá-Horákov is Pekárna Cave. In addition to its natural values, this cave is also an archaeological site, protected as a cultural monument. It is a valuable proof of intensive use of the cave for living during the Early Stone Age.

In Mokrá is Mokrá-Horákov Observation Tower. It is a small iron tower with a height of 10 m (33 ft).

== Notable people ==
- Miloslava Misáková (1922–2015), gymnast, Olympic winner
