= Ružica (given name) =

Ružica is a Serbo-Croatian feminine given name, a diminutive of Ruža ("Rose"), cognate of Rosie. It may refer to:

- Ružica Meglaj-Rimac, Croatian basketball player
- Ružica Sokić, Serbian actress
- Ružica Džankić (born 1994), Croatian basketball player
