= Luleč =

- Municipality
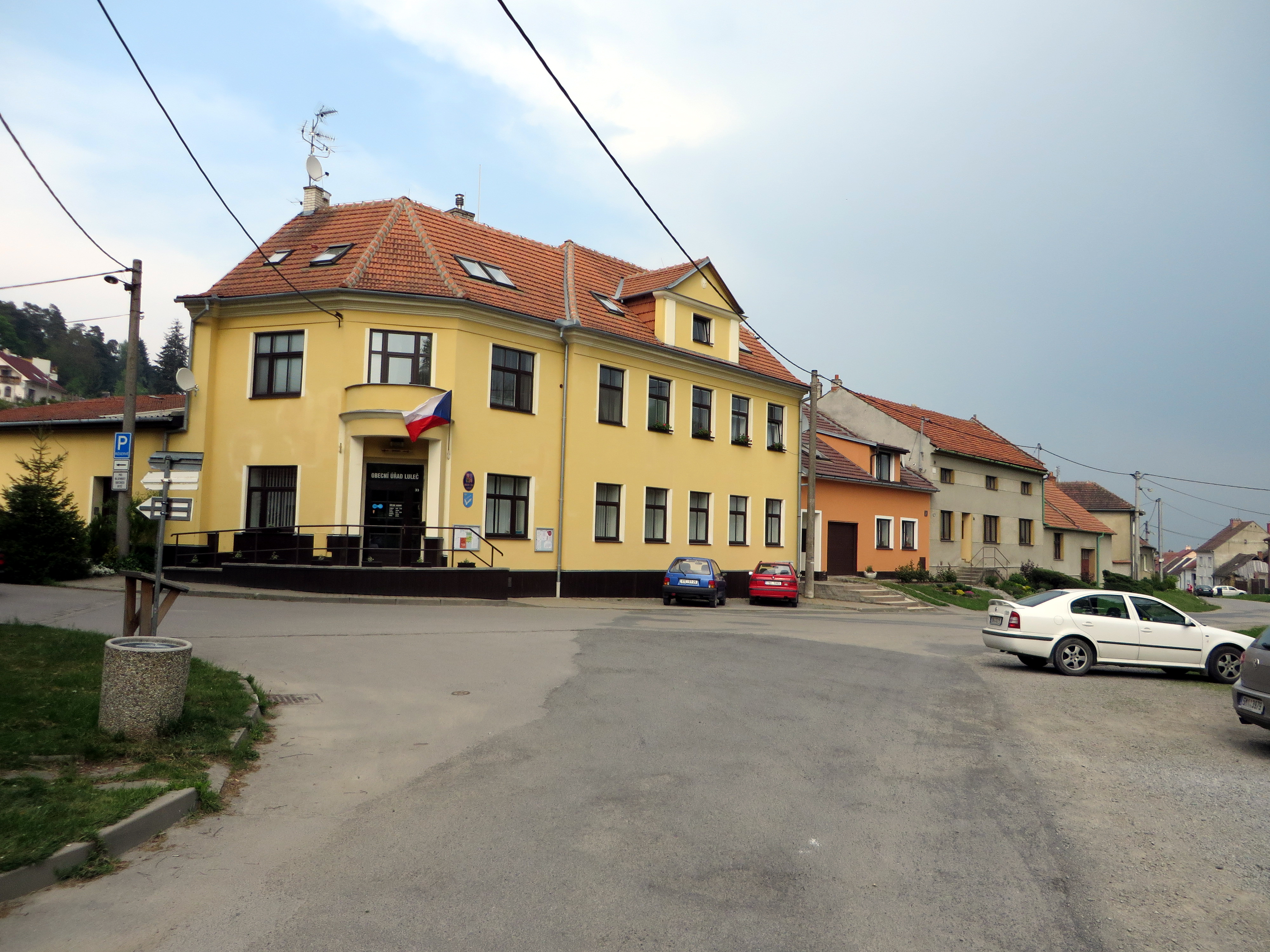
- Centre with the municipal office

- Flag Coat of arms

- Location in the Czech Republic
- Coordinates: 49°15′15″N 16°55′32″E
- Country: Czech Republic
- Region: South Moravian
- District: Vyškov
- First mentioned: 1349

Area
  - Total: 10.88 km^{2} (4.20 sq mi)
- Elevation: 302 m (991 ft)

Population (2026-01-01)
  - Total: 997
  - Density: 91.6/km^{2} (237/sq mi)
- Time zone: UTC+1 (CET)
  - Summer (DST): UTC+2 (CEST)
- Postal code: 683 03
- Website: www.lulec.cz

Luleč is a municipality and village in Vyškov District in the South Moravian Region of the Czech Republic. It has about 1,000 inhabitants.

Luleč lies approximately 5 kilometres (3 mi) west of Vyškov, 24 km (15 mi) east of Brno, and 203 km (126 mi) south-east of Prague.

== Demographics ==
Historical population
| Year | Pop. | ±% |
|---|---|---|
| 1869 | 931 | — |
| 1880 | 939 | +0.9% |
| 1890 | 966 | +2.9% |
| 1900 | 930 | −3.7% |
| 1910 | 969 | +4.2% |
| 1921 | 890 | −8.2% |
| 1930 | 1,003 | +12.7% |
| 1950 | 952 | −5.1% |
| 1961 | 990 | +4.0% |
| 1970 | 853 | −13.8% |
| 1980 | 723 | −15.2% |
| 1991 | 620 | −14.2% |
| 2001 | 644 | +3.9% |
| 2011 | 841 | +30.6% |
| 2021 | 948 | +12.7% |
Source: Censuses

== Notable people ==
- Marie Kovářová (1927–2023), gymnast, Olympic winner
