= Erika Enzenhofer =

Austrian gymnast (1926–2024)

Personal information
- Nationality: Austrian
- Born: 2 September 1926
- Died: 4 April 2024 (aged 97)

Sport
- Sport: Gymnastics

Erika Enzenhofer (2 September 1926 – 4 April 2024) was an Austrian gymnast. She competed in the women's artistic team all-around event at the 1948 Summer Olympics. Enzenhofer died on 4 April 2024, at the age of 97.
