= Dorothy Smith (gymnast) =

British gymnast (1919–2005)

Personal information
- Full name: Dorothy Smith
- Nationality: British
- Born: 16 November 1919 Keighley, West Yorkshire, England
- Died: 13 February 2005 (aged 85) Bradford, England

Sport
- Sport: Gymnastics

Dorothy Smith (16 November 1919 – 13 February 2005) was a British gymnast. She competed in the women's artistic team all-around at the 1948 Summer Olympics.

== Career ==
Dorothy Smith was part of the British gymnastics team at the 1948 Summer Olympics in London. The British team finished ninth in the women's artistic team all-around event.

In 1938, competing under her married name, Dorothy Brookes, she won the Yorkshire skipping and club-swinging titles at the Saltaire Gymnasium.

== Death ==
Smith died in Bradford, England on 13 February 2005, at the age of 85.
