= Anna Maria van Geene =

Dutch gymnast

Personal information
- Nationality: Dutch
- Born: 27 February 1928; Amsterdam, Netherlands
- Died: 14 October 1992 (aged 64); Bergen, Netherlands

Sport
- Sport: Gymnastics

Anna Maria van Geene (27 February 1928 – 14 October 1992) was a Dutch gymnast. She competed in the women's artistic team all-around event at the 1948 Summer Olympics.
