= Emilie Schwindt =

Belgian fencer (1903–1998)

Personal information
- Nationality: Belgian
- Born: Emilie Emma Suzanne Schwind; 2 November 1903 Forest, Belgium
- Died: 20 January 1998 (aged 94) Forest, Belgium

Sport
- Sport: Fencing

Emilie Emma Suzanne Schwind (2 November 1903 – 20 January 1998) was a Belgian fencer. She competed in the women's individual foil event at the 1948 Summer Olympics. Schwindt died in Forest, Belgium on 20 January 1998, at the age of 94.
