= Dientje Meijer-Haantjes =

Dutch gymnast

Personal information
- Nationality: Dutch
- Born: 17 March 1918; Amsterdam, Netherlands
- Died: 5 October 1994 (aged 76); Amsterdam, Netherlands

Sport
- Sport: Gymnastics

Dientje Meijer-Haantjes (17 March 1918 – 5 October 1994) was a Dutch gymnast. She competed in the women's artistic team all-around event at the 1948 Summer Olympics.
