= Louis Fauconnier =

Belgian modern pentathlete (1915–1994)

Personal information
- Born: Louis Joseph Emmanuel Fauconnier; 3 October 1915 Luttre, Belgium
- Died: 30 March 1994 (aged 78)

Sport
- Sport: Modern pentathlon

Louis Joseph Emmanuel Fauconnier (3 October 1915 – 30 March 1994) was a Belgian modern pentathlete. He competed at the 1948 Summer Olympics.
