= Norma Icardi =

Italian gymnast (born 1930)

Personal information
- Nationality: Italian
- Born: 16 August 1930 (age 94); Trieste, Italy

Sport
- Sport: Gymnastics

Norma Icardi (born 16 August 1930) is an Italian gymnast. She competed in the women's artistic team all-around at the 1948 Summer Olympics.
