= Ferenc Pataki =

Hungarian gymnast (1917–1988)

- Born: 18 September 1917 Budapest, Austria-Hungary
- Died: 25 April 1988 (aged 70) Budapest, Hungary

Gymnastics career
- Discipline: Men's artistic gymnastics
- Country represented: Hungary
Medal record
Olympic Games
Gold medal – first place	1948 London	Floor exercise
Bronze medal – third place	1948 London	Vault
Bronze medal – third place	1948 London	Team

Ferenc Pataki (18 September 1917 – 25 April 1988) was a Hungarian gymnast and Olympic champion.

He competed at the 1948 Summer Olympics in London where he received a gold medal in floor exercise, and bronze medals in vault and team combined exercises.
