= Audrey Rennard =

British gymnast (1933–2020)

Personal information
- Nationality: British
- Born: 14 January 1933 Bierley, West Riding of Yorkshire, England
- Died: 19 January 2020 (aged 87) Baildon, West Yorkshire, England

Sport
- Sport: Gymnastics

Audrey Rennard (later Beever; 14 January 1933 – 19 January 2020) was a British gymnast. She competed in the women's artistic team all-around at the 1948 Summer Olympics.
