= Monique Yvinou =

French gymnast and teacher (1928–2021)

Personal information
- Full name: Monique Bouet, née Yvinou
- Nationality: French
- Born: 10 June 1928; Quimper, France
- Died: 5 February 2021 (aged 92); Quimper, France

Sport
- Sport: Gymnastics

Monique Bouet (née Yvinou; 10 June 1928 – 5 February 2021) was a French gymnast and schoolteacher. She competed in the women's artistic team all-around at the 1948 Summer Olympics.

Bouet was born in Quimper, Finistère, Brittany, France. She worked as a physical education teacher, and continued to host fitness classes until the age of 85.
