= Gerola Lindahl =

Swedish gymnast

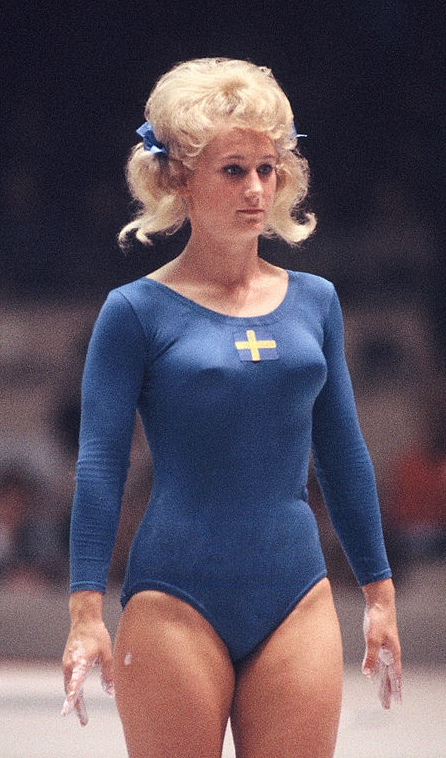
- Gerola Lindahl at the 1964 Olympic Games

Personal information
- Nationality: Swedish
- Born: 20 July 1943 (age 81); Stockholm, Sweden

Sport
- Sport: Gymnastics

Gerola Lindahl (born 20 July 1943) is a Swedish gymnast. She competed at the 1960 Summer Olympics and the 1964 Summer Olympics.
