= Ingrid Andersson (author) =

Swedish author (1918–1994)

- Born: 24 April 1918; Timrå, Medelpad, Sweden
- Died: 12 February 1994 (aged 75)
- Occupation: author

Ingrid Svea Margareta Andersson (24 April 1918 – 12 February 1994) was a Swedish author. Her works focused mainly on the culture of the Norrland region.

== Biography ==
Ingrid Andersson was born and raised on the island of Timrå in the south-western Norrland area of Sweden. Her first novel, Två berättelser (Two Stories) was published in 1975, when she was 57 years old, and describes the life and legends of the people of the south-western Norrland. This was followed the next year by Ensamheten (The Solitude) which told the story of a lonely older woman and inter-generational relations. Ensamheten was translated into English and German. In 1979 Andersson's autobiographical book Barnet (The Child) was published, and was followed in 1982 by Andersson's final book Tillbaka till livet (Back to life) which tells the story of a young woman who suffers aphasia after a car accident.

Andersson won the Norrlands Litteraturpris for Norrland Literature awarded by the Norrländska litteratursällskapet in 1977, and the Landsbygdens författarstipendium for rural authors awarded by the Studieförbundet Vuxenskolan in 1978. She also received the Sundsvall commune's 1975 Kulturstipendium and made appearances on Swedish radio.

Andersson died on 12 February 1994, at the age of 75.
