= Lilia Torriani =

Italian gymnast

Personal information
- Nationality: Italian
- Born: 30 November 1920; Genoa, Italy
- Died: 22 October 2003 (aged 82)

Sport
- Sport: Gymnastics

Lilia Torriani (30 November 1920 – 22 October 2003) was an Italian gymnast. She competed in the women's artistic team all-around at the 1948 Summer Olympics.
