= Neža Černe =

Slovenian gymnast (born 1933)

Personal information
- Nationality: Slovenian
- Born: 1933; Maribor, Yugoslavia

Sport
- Sport: Gymnastics

Neža Černe (born 1933) is a Slovenian gymnast. She competed in the women's artistic team all-around at the 1948 Summer Olympics.
