= Vida Gerbec =

Slovenian gymnast (1925–2010)

Personal information
- Nationality: Slovenian
- Born: 12 July 1925; Trieste, Italy
- Died: 22 November 2010 (aged 85); Koper, Slovenia

Sport
- Sport: Gymnastics

Vida Gerbec (12 July 1925 – 22 November 2010) was a Slovenian gymnast. She competed in the women's artistic team all-around at the 1948 Summer Olympics.
