= Klara Post =

Dutch gymnast (1926–2022)

Personal information
- Full name: Klaasje Post
- Nationality: Dutch
- Born: 5 July 1926; Arnhem, Netherlands
- Died: 12 January 2022 (aged 95)

Sport
- Sport: Gymnastics

Klara Post (5 July 1926 – 12 January 2022) was a Dutch gymnast. She competed in the women's artistic team all-around event at the 1948 Summer Olympics. Post died on 12 January 2022, at the age of 95.
