= Ulla Lindström (gymnast) =

Swedish gymnast

Personal information
- Nationality: Swedish
- Born: 17 April 1943 (age 82); Huskvarna, Sweden

Sport
- Sport: Gymnastics

Ulla Lindström (born 17 April 1943) is a Swedish gymnast. She competed at the 1960 Summer Olympics and the 1964 Summer Olympics.
