= Dragica Basletić =

Croatian gymnast (1916–1976)

Personal information
- Nationality: Croatian
- Born: 30 August 1916; Rijeka, Austria-Hungary
- Died: 26 August 1976 (aged 59); Zagreb, Yugoslavia

Sport
- Sport: Gymnastics

Dragica Basletić (30 August 1916 – 26 August 1976) was a Croatian gymnast. She competed in the women's artistic team all-around at the 1948 Summer Olympics.
