= Charles Vyt =

Belgian modern pentathlete (1914–2002)

Personal information
- Born: Carolus Pharailda Petrus Vyt; 2 January 1914 Brasschaat, Belgium
- Died: 28 July 2002 (aged 88) Tervuren, Belgium

Sport
- Sport: Modern pentathlon

Carolus Pharailda Petrus "Charles" Vyt (2 January 1914 – 28 July 2002) was a Belgian modern pentathlete. He competed at the 1948 Summer Olympics and he was also the flag bearer for Belgium at these Olympics. died in Tervuren, Belgium on 28 July 2002, at the age of 88.
