= Zlatica Mijatović =

Serbian gymnast (1922–2019)

Personal information
- Nationality: Serbian
- Born: 1 March 1922; Sombor, Kingdom of Serbs, Croats and Slovenes
- Died: 15 February 2019 (aged 96)

Sport
- Sport: Gymnastics

Zlatica Mijatović Waldman (1 March 1922 – 15 February 2019) was a Serbian gymnast. She competed in the women's artistic team all-around at the 1948 Summer Olympics.
