= Luciana Pezzoni =

Italian gymnast (born 1928)

Personal information
- Nationality: Italian
- Born: 31 October 1928 Lodi, Italy

Sport
- Sport: Gymnastics

Luciana Pezzoni (born 31 October 1928) is an Italian former gymnast. She competed in the women's artistic team all-around at the 1948 Summer Olympics.
