= Jeanine Touchard =

French gymnast

Personal information
- Nationality: French
- Born: 25 November 1924; Bondy, France
- Died: 23 December 2005 (aged 81); Saint-Mandé, France

Sport
- Sport: Gymnastics

Jeanine Emelie Marcelle Touchard-Vapaille (25 November 1924 – 23 December 2005) was a French gymnast. She competed in the women's artistic team all-around at the 1948 Summer Olympics.
