= Wanda Nuti =

Italian gymnast

Personal information
- Nationality: Italian
- Born: 21 September 1925; Colle di Val d'Elsa, Italy
- Died: 7 August 2017 (aged 91); Prato, Italy

Sport
- Sport: Gymnastics

Wanda Nuti (21 September 1925 – 7 August 2017) was an Italian gymnast. She competed in the women's artistic team all-around at the 1948 Summer Olympics.
