= Erna Wachtel =

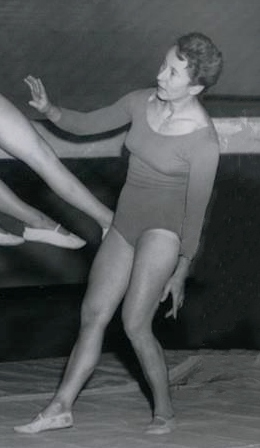
- Wachtel coaching in 1956

Personal information
- Born: April 3, 1907 Racibórz, Poland (then Prussia)
- Died: June 1, 1995 (aged 88) Chicago, U.S.

Sport
- Sport: Artistic gymnastics
- Club: Lincoln Turners

Erna Wachtel (April 3, 1907 – June 1, 1995) was an American artistic gymnast, coach and judge.

== Early life ==
Born in Germany, she immigrated to the United States at the age of 19.

== Athletic career ==
Wachtel won multiple AAU titles, and in 1944 was named an Honorary Olympic Team member for the games that were cancelled due to World War II.

== Later life ==
After retiring from competitions served as an AAU functionary, international referee, and national gymnastics coach, preparing the American women's gymnastics team to the 1956 Summer Olympics. From 1957 to 1973, she taught physical education at the Chicago Park District. In 1974 she was inducted into the U.S. Gymnastics Hall of Fame.

== Personal life ==
Wachtel never married.
