= Jacoba Wijnands =

Dutch gymnast (1924–2019)

Personal information
- Nationality: Dutch
- Born: 28 June 1924; Rotterdam, Netherlands
- Died: 2 February 2019 (aged 94)

Sport
- Sport: Gymnastics

Jacoba Wijnands (28 June 1924 – 2 February 2019) was a Dutch gymnast. She competed in the women's artistic team all-around event at the 1948 Summer Olympics.
