= Irén Daruházi-Karcsics =

Hungarian gymnast (1927–2011)

Olympic medal record

Women's gymnastics

Representing Hungary
Silver medal – second place	1948 London	Team
Silver medal – second place	1952 Helsinki	Team
Bronze medal – third place	1952 Helsinki	Team Portable Apparatus

Irén Daruházi-Karcsics (18 March 1927 – 13 October 2011) was a Hungarian gymnast who competed in the 1948 Summer Olympics and in the 1952 Summer Olympics. At the 1948 Games, she won the silver medal in the team competition. At the 1952 Games, Daruházi-Karcsics won silver medal with the Hungarian team and a bronze medal in the team portable apparatus.
