= Anna Fehér =

Hungarian gymnast

Medal record

Women's gymnastics

Representing Hungary

Olympic Games
| Silver medal – second place | 1948 London | Team |

Anna Fehér (24 September 1921 – 30 December 1999) was a Hungarian gymnast. She competed in the 1948 Summer Olympics, winning a silver medal in the team competition.
