= Gretchen Hehenberger =

Austrian gymnast (1918–2012)

Gretchen Hehenberger (10 February 1918 – 11 March 2012) was an Austrian gymnast who competed in the 1948 Summer Olympics. Before moving to Austria after her marriage to Ernst Hehenberger (1917-2007) in 1943, Gretchen Sievers twice won the German championships in a combined Gymnastics and Track & Field competition including 10 different disciplines. She barely missed the 1936 Olympics due to a broken leg. In 1948, she already was the mother of two boys, Rainer (born 1944) and Michael (born 1945), respectively.
