= Flying rings =

Former gymnastics event

Dislocate at end of front swing

Flying rings was a gymnastics event similar to still rings, but with the performer gripping a pair of rings, approximately shoulder width apart, and swinging— from the point of suspension of the rings— while executing a series of stunts.

== Apparatus ==
Whereas still rings are now 9.8 feet from the point of attachment, flying rings – also used as still rings in the past – were on cables up to 22 feet in length - the extra 12 feet allowing the gymnast to swing through an impressive arc. The rings themselves were at times larger and heavier than competition still rings today, designed on a steel core covered by rubber or leather.

== History ==
There is some evidence that the event took place in an international contest in the late 1800s, if not earlier. Records from Princeton University indicate one of its students, H. G. Otis, won the Eastern Intercollegiate Championships in flying rings in 1902. In America, the event persisted on a regular basis in both NCAA and AAU gymnastic competitions until the early 1960s, when those governing bodies eliminated the flying rings in future meets in an effort to correlate apparatus and performances with those in the modern Olympic Games. Another reason flying rings was removed from intercollegiate competitions is the dangerous nature of the event, with the gymnast soaring to a height of 15 feet or so at each end of a swing. Frank Snay, of Navy, was the last winner in the NCAA event in 1961. It is difficult to ascertain if flying rings ever existed in the Olympic Games, for records occasionally cite medalists in "flying rings" when in fact the event may have been the still rings.

In the 1948 Olympic women's artistic team all-around, there was a compulsory flying rings routine.

== The performance ==
To start a routine, the gymnast jumped or was lifted until he could grasp the rings; then an assistant pulled or pushed him, starting his swing. At the end of each arc the gymnast would do pikes, dislocates or front or back-uprises to build up height. A typical routine would show a number of "flying" dislocates or inlocates (a dislocate leading directly to a support above the rings or a shoulder stand). Advanced performers would do two tricks at each end of the swing. Such as a dislocate to a shoot the shoulder move done in the front or the back of the swing. The performer might also do additional moves typical of the still rings while in flight. After several passes the routine would end with a (usually) spectacular dismount, normally off a front swing. The winning dismount at the AAU held at the Air Force Academy in 1960 was at the front of the swing, a front dislocate immediately into a double flyaway from 15 feet. Fellow gymnasts in place, prepared to help break a fall if the move failed.

== Safety features ==
No nets or other safety devices, apart from standard gym mats, were used in competition, although, when training, gymnasts frequently used a flying mechanic (a suspended support rig).
