= Traudl Ruckser =

Austrian gymnast (1925–2018)

Irmentraud Ruckser (13 February 1925 – 23 April 2018) was an Austrian gymnast who competed in the 1948 Summer Olympics. She died in Vienna in April 2018 at the age of 93.
