= Ladislava Bakanic =

American gymnast (1924–2021)

Personal information
- Full name: Ladislava Aloisie Bakanic
- Born: May 3, 1924 New York City, New York, U.S.
- Died: February 26, 2021 (aged 96)
Medal record
Women's gymnastics
Representing the United States
Olympic Games
Bronze medal – third place	1948 London	Team

Ladislava Aloisie Bakanic (May 3, 1924 – February 26, 2021) was an American gymnast who competed in the 1948 Summer Olympics and won team bronze. She was born in New York City.
