= Milena Müllerová =

Czech gymnast

Olympic medal record

Women's gymnastics

Representing Czechoslovakia
Gold medal – first place	1948 London	Team

Milena Müllerová (9 June 1923, in Babice – 15 December 2009, in Prague) was a Czech gymnast who competed in the 1948 Summer Olympics and won a gold medal in the team competition.
