= Dorothy Dalton (gymnast) =

American gymnast

Olympic medal record

Women's gymnastics

Representing the United States
Bronze medal – third place	1948 London	Team

Dorothy Dalton (1 August 1922 – 9 May 1973) was an American gymnast who competed in the 1948 Summer Olympics and in the 1952 Summer Olympics.
