= Margit Nagy-Sándor =

Hungarian gymnast (1921–2001)

Olympic medal record

Women's gymnastics

Representing Hungary
Silver medal – second place	1948 London	Team
Bronze medal – third place	1936 Berlin	Team

Margit Nagy-Sándor (29 May 1921 – 15 January 2001) was a Hungarian gymnast who competed in the 1936 Summer Olympics and in the 1948 Summer Olympics, winning a team bronze and a team silver medal, respectively.
