= Edit Perényi-Weckinger =

Hungarian gymnast (1923–2019)

Olympic medal record

Women's gymnastics

Representing Hungary
Silver medal – second place	1948 London	Team
Silver medal – second place	1952 Helsinki	Team
Bronze medal – third place	1952 Helsinki	Team Portable Apparatus

Edit Perényi-Weckinger (5 May 1923 – 1 February 2019) was a Hungarian gymnast who competed in the 1948 Summer Olympics and in the 1952 Summer Olympics. She was born in Kispest.

At the London Olympics in 1948, she won silver in the team competition, behind the Czechs and ahead of the Americans. In 1952, she participated in the Helsinki Olympics, winning the silver medal in the team competition - behind the Soviets and ahead of the Czechoslovakia - and the bronze in the team competition with equipment (a modality similar to the current rhythmic gymnastics), behind the Swedes and the Soviets.
