= Kerstin Bohman =

Swedish gymnast

Personal information
- Nationality: Swedish
- Born: 9 November 1914 Hudiksvall, Sweden
- Died: 3 January 2005 (aged 80) Stockholm, Sweden

Sport
- Sport: Gymnastics

Kerstin Bohman (9 November 1914 – 3 January 2005) was a Swedish gymnast. She competed in the women's artistic team all-around event at the 1948 Summer Olympics where her team finished in the fourth place.
