= Anita Simonis =

American gymnast

Olympic medal record

Women's gymnastics

Representing United States
Bronze medal – third place	1948 London	Team

Anita Simonis Zetts (March 2, 1926 – December 11, 2011) was an American gymnast who competed in the 1948 Summer Olympics, where she won a bronze medal. Simonis Zetts was born in New York City and competed in gymnastics throughout her life. She was also a mother to four children.
