= Karin Lindberg =

Swedish gymnast (1929–2020)

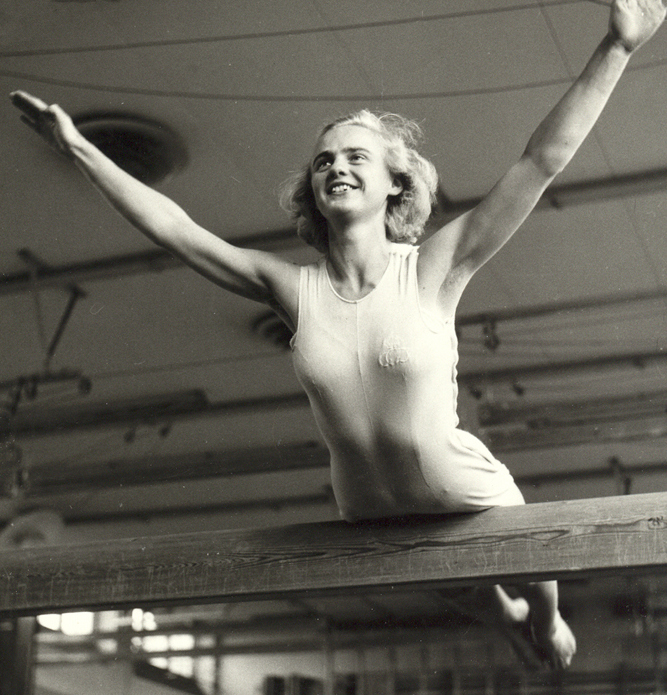

Personal information
- Born: 6 October 1929 Kalix, Sweden
- Died: 2 December 2020 (aged 91) Örebro, Sweden

Gymnastics career
- Discipline: Women's artistic gymnastics
- Club: GK Stockholmsflickorna, Stockholm; Arbetarnas GF, Örebro; SSIF, Stockholm
Medal record
Representing Sweden
Olympic Games
Gold medal – first place	1952 Helsinki	Team portable apparatus
Silver medal – second place	1956 Melbourne	Team portable apparatus
World Championships
Gold medal – first place	1950 Basel	Team all-around

Karin Elisabet Lindberg (later Lindén, 6 October 1929 – 2 December 2020) was a Swedish artistic gymnast. She competed at the 1948, 1952 and 1956 Summer Olympics and won a gold and a silver medal in team exercise with portable apparatus, in 1952 and 1956, respectively. Her teams finished fourth in the all-around in 1948 and 1952.

== Personal life ==
Lindberg was born in Kalix, Sweden on October 6, 1929 and moved to Stockholm as a child. She trained as a pharmacist while competing in gymnastics and began working as one in 1950. Later, she trained at the Gymnastics Central Institute to become a gymnastics director and completed her studies in 1954.

She married Erik Lindén, a trainer for the Swedish men's gymnastics team, three weeks before the 1956 Olympics. They moved to Örebro. The couple had two children together. Her husband died in 1977, and Lindberg died December 2, 2020.

== Career ==
Lindberg tried gymnastics in her early teens at an event held by Östermalms IP. A coach there had just begun a girls' gymnastics team, and Lindberg joined and began training several times a week. She participated in her first competition in 1947.

At the 1948 Summer Olympics, she was the youngest member of the Swedish team at 19 years old. It was also the first time that Sweden had sent a gymnastics team to the Olympics since 1920 due to differences between Swedish gymnastics and the developing international style of the sport. Lindberg enjoyed the flying rings event, which was removed after the 1948 Olympics.

Lindberg had the highest score in the entire competition on vault in both the compulsory and optional segments of the competition, although the Swedish gymnasts competed vault late at night with no audience. She did not receive a medal, as at that time only team medals were awarded to women. Much later in her life, Lindberg came to regard this as unfair, as men did receive individual medals at that Olympics, and did several interviews criticizing the discrepancy.

She next competed at the 1950 World Championships, which the Swedish team won; the result was unexpected, and the organizers did not have their national anthem prepared to play, which Lindberg found upsetting. She also participated in gymnastics demonstrations in other countries.

Lindberg remained impressive on vault in the following years, as evidenced by the fact that she took seventh place on the vault at the 1952 Summer Olympics. The Swedish team came in fourth and won gold in the team portable apparatus event. Lindberg was named Sportswomen of the Year in 1952.

In 1952 and 1953, she won the gold all-around medal at the national championships in the international style of gymnastics. She participated in the first World Gymnaestrada in Rotterdam in 1953. At the 1954 World Championships, Lindberg was the only remaining team member from the 1948 Olympic team. The Swedish team came in eight place and won bronze in the team apparatus event.

Lindberg continued to travel for gymnastics demonstrations; at the end of a 1955 tour in the United States, she was hit by a car and spent a month in the hospital with a pelvis injury. Lindberg felt that the Swedish Gymnastics Federation did little to help her while she recovered, but she received financial assistance for her return ticket from Swedish-American families. She returned to Sweden in April 1956 and was able to run again by June.

She was able to compete in the 1956 Swedish championships and was sent to the 1956 Summer Olympics, her last competition. She won a silver medal in the team portable apparatus event.

After she completed her competitive career, she worked in physical education and was the host of the radio gymnastics program Morgonpasset.
