= Consetta Caruccio-Lenz =

American gymnast (1918–1980)

- Consetta Caruccio-Lenz on balance beam at the 1936 Berlin Summer Olympics

Personal information
- Born: July 26, 1918
- Died: July 2, 1980 (aged 61)

Gymnastics career
- Discipline: Women's artistic gymnastics
- Country represented: United States
Medal record
Representing United States
Olympic Games
Bronze medal – third place	1948 London	Team

Consetta Caruccio-Lenz (26 September 1918 – 2 July 1980) was an American gymnast who competed in the 1936 Berlin Summer Olympics and in the 1948 London Summer Olympics.

Caruccio got her start in gymnastics at the age of 14 when she joined the Germania Turnverein gymnastics club in Baltimore, Maryland. A multi-sport athlete, at one point she set the US national record for the 50 yard dash, completing it in 6.3 seconds.

Incidentally, at the 1936 Berlin Olympics, where she competed when she was 18 years old, although individual medals had been awarded to male gymnasts since the inception of the modern Olympic Games in 1896, women were not awarded with individual medals there as they would not be awarded with individual medals until 1952; however, under the rules that began in 1952, Caruccio's performance in 1936 would have garnered her an individual medal of third-place bronze on balance beam, as Caruccio had the 3rd-highest score on the apparatus, tied with Germany's Erna Bürger, of 60+ athletes in the competition. Additionally, Caruccio had the very highest score on the bars (uncertainty exists as to whether this was the parallel bars or uneven bars, as some women competed on one and others on the other) in the voluntary segment of the competition. At the next Olympics in 1948, she would officially receive a medal as she helped her team to the bronze medal there.

Lenz served for 9 years on the U.S. Women's Olympic committee and was inducted in the USA Gymnastics Hall of Fame in 1976, the third year in which women were inducted into their Hall of Fame.
