= Erzsébet Balázs =

Hungarian gymnast (1920–2014)

Olympic medal record

Representing Hungary

Women's gymnastics

Olympic Games
Silver medal – second place	1948 London	Women's team competition

Erzsébet Balázs-Baranyai (October 15, 1920 − November 24, 2014) was a Hungarian gymnast who competed at the 1948 Summer Olympics in London, where she won a silver medal in the women's team competition after replacing an injured Ágnes Keleti. Born in Budapest, she was introduced to gymnastics at the age of 18 and competed out of Postás SE while earning a degree in physical education from Semmelweis University. From 1952 through 1971 she worked as a coach with Budapest Honvéd, becoming the head gymnastics coach in 1960. From there she spent two years at the Debreceni Városi Sportiskola (Debrecen School of Sport) prior to becoming a coach for Hungary's delegation of women gymnasts to the 1976 Summer Olympics and retiring in 1977. She was married to László Baranyai, who won a bronze medal in the men's team competition at the same Olympic Games. She died on November 24, 2014, at the age of 94.
