= László Baranyai =

Hungarian gymnast (1920–1984)

- Born: 13 January 1920 Budapest, Kingdom of Hungary
- Died: 14 December 1984 (aged 64) Budapest, Hungarian People's Republic
- Spouse: Erzsébet Balázs

Gymnastics career
- Discipline: Men's artistic gymnastics
- Country represented: Hungary
- Club: Postás Sportegyesület
Medal record
Men's artistic gymnastics
Representing Hungary
Olympic Games
Bronze medal – third place	1948 London	Team

László Baranyai (13 January 1920 – 14 December 1984) was a Hungarian gymnast, born in Budapest. He competed in gymnastics events at the 1948 Summer Olympics. He won a bronze medal with the Hungarian team at the 1948 Summer Olympics.

He was married to Erzsébet Balázs.
