= Mária Zalai-Kövi =

Hungarian gymnast (1924–2013)

Olympic medal record

Women's gymnastics

Representing Hungary
Silver medal – second place	1948 London	Team
Silver medal – second place	1952 Helsinki	Team
Bronze medal – third place	1952 Helsinki	Team Portable Apparatus

Mária Zalai-Kövi (20 September 1923 – 28 October 2013) was a Hungarian gymnast who competed in the 1948 Summer Olympics and in the 1952 Summer Olympics. She was born in Târgu Mureș, Romania. At the London Olympics in 1948, she won silver in the team competition. At the 1952 Olympic Games, Zalai-Kövi won a silver medal with the Hungarian team and a bronze medal in the team portable apparatus.
