= Stina Haage =

Swedish gymnast

- Born: 3 August 1924 Landskrona
- Died: 15 June 2017 (aged 92) Lidingö

Gymnastics career
- Discipline: Women's artistic gymnastics
- Country represented: Sweden

Ulla Stina Ljunggren, (née Haage; 3 August 1924 – 15 June 2017) was a Swedish gymnast. She competed in the women's artistic team all-around event at the 1948 Summer Olympics, in London, where the Swedish team finished in the fourth place. Afterward, she became influential in promoting sport in Sweden.

== Biography ==
Haage was born in Landskrona in 1924. She had four siblings, and the family moved to Stockholm when she was around 7.

She enrolled at the Swedish School of Sport and Health Sciences in 1946 due to her interest in gymnastics and became qualified in physical education. In 1948, she competed at the Summer Olympics, where she placed fourth in the team event with her Swedish teammates.

In 1949, she married Olle Ljunggren. The couple had two children together and also often worked together. Between 1949 and 1954, they worked in physical education in Belgium, then returned to Sweden to work at the Swedish School of Sport and Health Sciences. Between 1955 and 1977, Haage taught gymnastics and joined a number of sports-related organizations; she was on the board of the Swedish Gymnastics Association and became a brevet gymnastics judge.

In 1972, she was elected to the board of the Swedish Olympic Committee, the first woman to join the board. She held the position through the end of the 1980s. In 1977, she also became the director of the Swedish School of Sport and Health Sciences and was the first woman to hold that position as well. Her focuses as director included sports science and pedagogy. Later in her career, she gained an interest in parasports and sports for children with impairments.

She died in 2017 at the age of 92.
