= Truida Heil-Bonnet =

Dutch gymnast

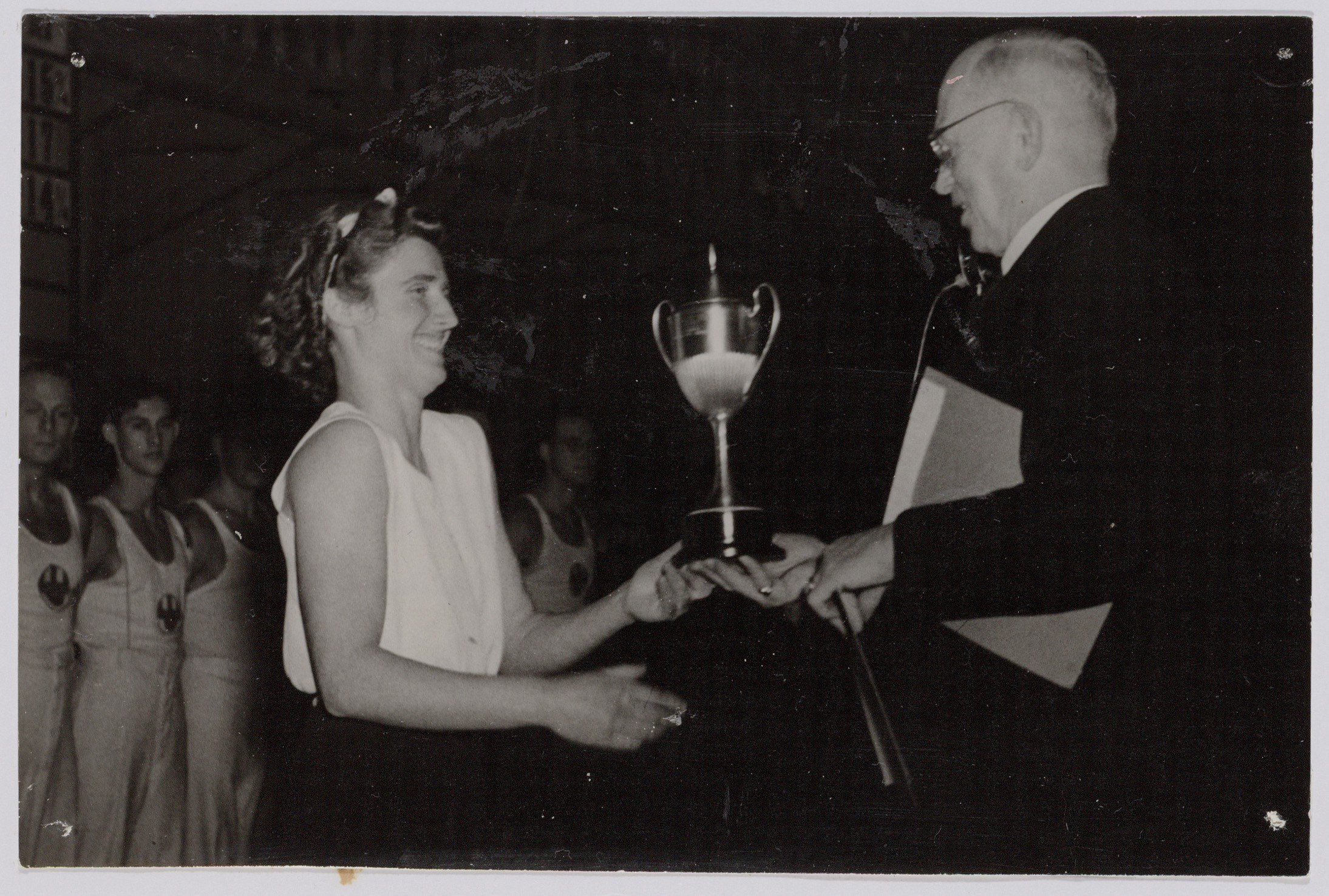
Truida Heil-Bonnet (1947)

Geertruida Johanna "Truida" Heil-Bonnet (11 July 1920 – 4 July 2014) was a Dutch artistic gymnast who competed in the 1948 Summer Olympics. She was born in Amsterdam.
