= Laura Micheli =

Italian gymnast (1931–2025)

Personal information
- Nationality: Italian
- Born: 21 April 1931 Trieste, Italy
- Died: 8 July 2025 (aged 94)

Sport
- Sport: Gymnastics

Laura Micheli (21 April 1931 – 8 July 2025) was an Italian gymnast. She was married to Romeo Romanutti. She competed in the women's artistic team all-around at the 1948 Summer Olympics. Micheli died on 8 July 2025, at the age of 94.
