= Nereto =

- Comune
- Comune di Nereto
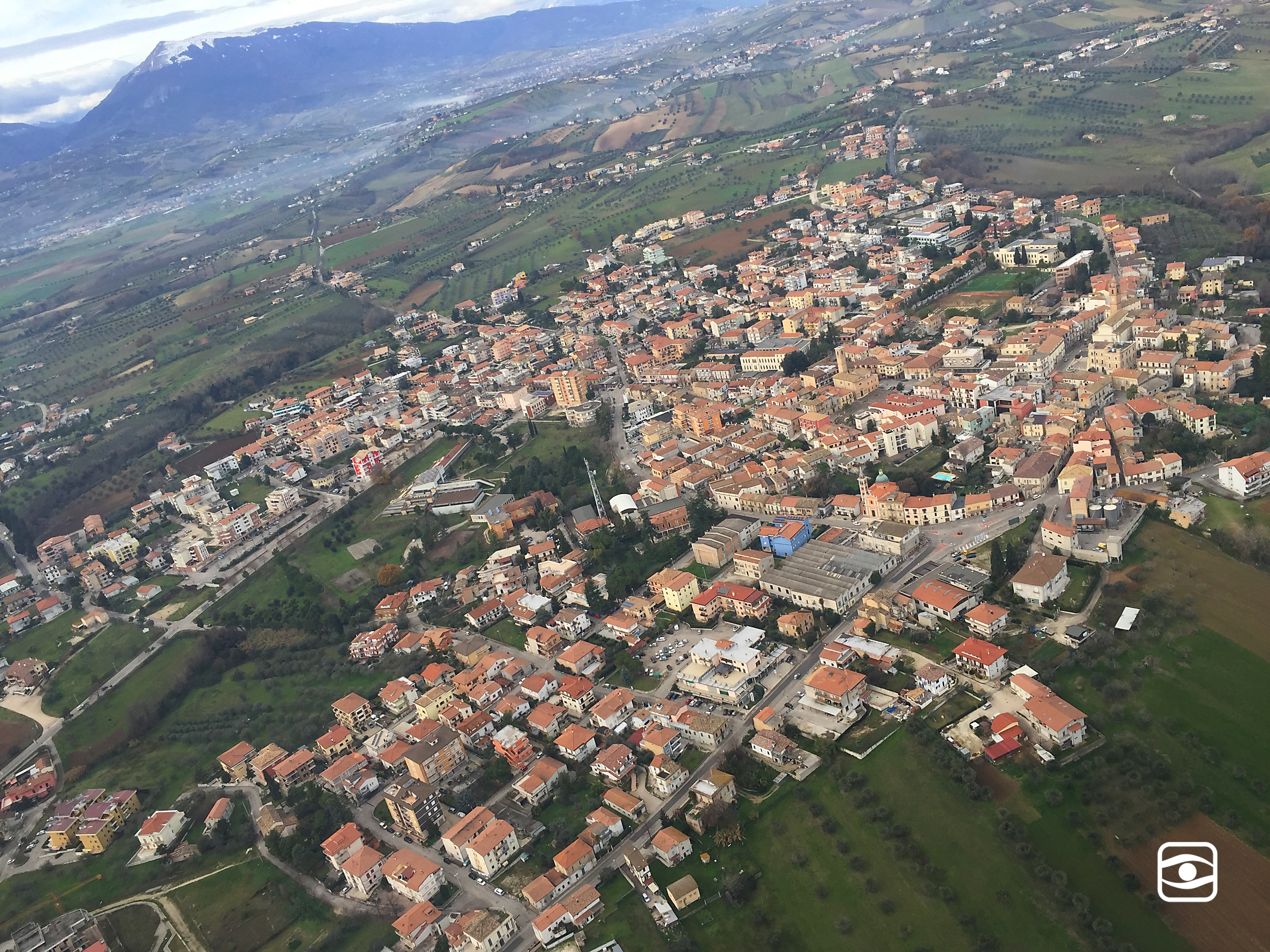

- Location within Italy Location within Abruzzo
- Coordinates: 42°49′12″N 13°49′1″E
- Country: Italy
- Region: Abruzzo
- Province: Teramo (TE)
- Frazioni: Capo di Valle, Certosa, Parignano, Pignotto, Rote, San Martino, San Savino, Vibrata

Area
  - Total: 7 km^{2} (2.7 sq mi)
- Elevation: 163 m (535 ft)

Population (31 December 2008)
  - Total: 4,993
  - Density: 710/km^{2} (1,800/sq mi)
- Demonym: Neretesi
- Time zone: UTC+1 (CET)
  - Summer (DST): UTC+2 (CEST)
- Postal code: 64015
- Dialing code: 0861
- ISTAT code: 067031
- Patron saint: San Martino
- Saint day: 11 November
- Website: Official website

Nereto is a town and comune in Teramo province in the Abruzzo region of eastern Italy.

== Climate ==
Climate data for Nereto, elevation 163 m (535 ft), (1951–2000)
Month	Jan	Feb	Mar	Apr	May	Jun	Jul	Aug	Sep	Oct	Nov	Dec	Year
Record high °C (°F)	22.0 (71.6)	24.8 (76.6)	26.2 (79.2)	28.7 (83.7)	35.0 (95.0)	35.5 (95.9)	43.2 (109.8)	41.0 (105.8)	36.0 (96.8)	31.0 (87.8)	27.5 (81.5)	25.0 (77.0)	43.2 (109.8)
Mean daily maximum °C (°F)	10.1 (50.2)	11.4 (52.5)	14.2 (57.6)	17.9 (64.2)	22.7 (72.9)	26.8 (80.2)	30.0 (86.0)	29.8 (85.6)	25.9 (78.6)	20.5 (68.9)	14.9 (58.8)	11.3 (52.3)	19.6 (67.3)
Daily mean °C (°F)	7.0 (44.6)	7.8 (46.0)	10.2 (50.4)	13.5 (56.3)	17.9 (64.2)	21.8 (71.2)	24.7 (76.5)	24.6 (76.3)	21.1 (70.0)	16.5 (61.7)	11.6 (52.9)	8.2 (46.8)	15.4 (59.7)
Mean daily minimum °C (°F)	3.9 (39.0)	4.2 (39.6)	6.2 (43.2)	9.0 (48.2)	13.0 (55.4)	16.8 (62.2)	19.5 (67.1)	19.5 (67.1)	16.4 (61.5)	12.4 (54.3)	8.2 (46.8)	5.2 (41.4)	11.2 (52.2)
Record low °C (°F)	−6.0 (21.2)	−6.5 (20.3)	−5.5 (22.1)	−0.9 (30.4)	1.0 (33.8)	5.2 (41.4)	11.8 (53.2)	10.3 (50.5)	6.5 (43.7)	2.4 (36.3)	−1.7 (28.9)	−5.0 (23.0)	−6.5 (20.3)
Average precipitation mm (inches)	60.5 (2.38)	52.2 (2.06)	68.1 (2.68)	63.6 (2.50)	46.7 (1.84)	51.8 (2.04)	43.0 (1.69)	53.9 (2.12)	62.1 (2.44)	83.9 (3.30)	79.4 (3.13)	76.2 (3.00)	741.4 (29.18)
Average precipitation days	5.9	6.1	6.9	6.3	5.9	6.0	4.5	4.3	5.6	6.6	7.1	8.0	73.2
Source: Regione Abruzzo
