= Edeltraud Schramm =

Austrian gymnast (1923–2002)

Personal information
- Nationality: Austrian
- Born: 16 December 1923; Linz, Austria
- Died: 1 October 2002 (aged 78); Linz, Austria

Sport
- Sport: Gymnastics

Edeltraud Schramm (16 December 1923 – 1 October 2002) was an Austrian gymnast. She competed at the 1948 Summer Olympics and the 1952 Summer Olympics.
