= Gunnel Johansson =

Swedish gymnast (1922–2013)

Gunnel Johansson (12 August 1922 – 7 May 2013) was a Swedish artistic gymnast. She competed in the women's artistic team all-around event at the 1948 Summer Olympics where the Swedish team finished in the fourth place.
