= Lenie Gerrietsen =

Dutch gymnast (1930–2024)

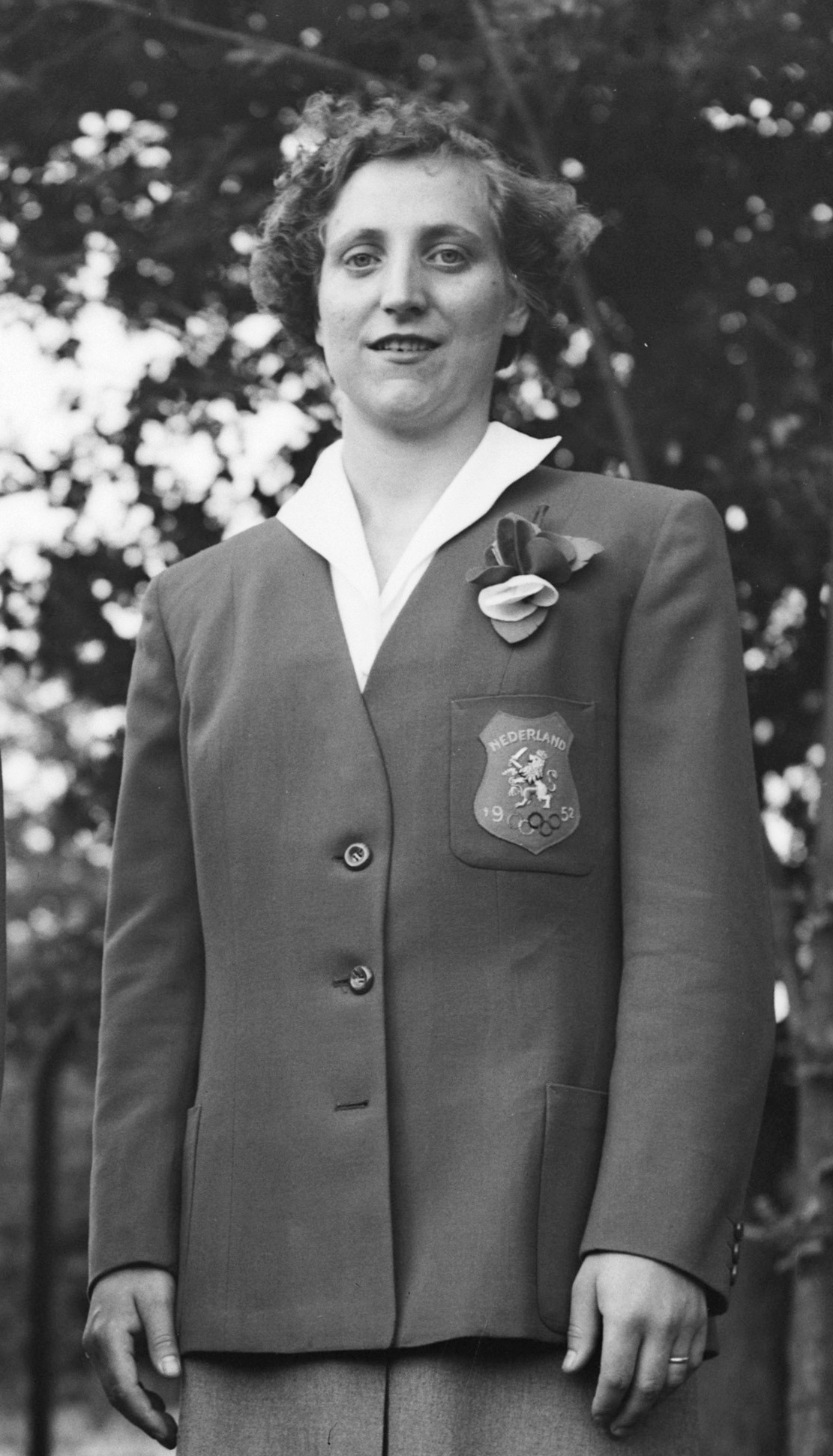
- Gerrietsen in 1952

Personal information
- Born: 28 March 1930 Utrecht, Netherlands
- Died: 22 June 2024 (aged 94) Utrecht, Netherlands

Sport
- Sport: Artistic gymnastics
- Club: Kracht en Vlugheid, Utrecht

Helena Antonette "Lenie" Gerrietsen (28 March 1930 – 22 June 2024) was a Dutch gymnast who competed at the 1948 Summer Olympics in London and the 1952 Summer Olympics in Helsinki. In 1948, Gerrietsen placed fifth in the team all-around competition. In 1952, she competed in all artistic gymnastics events with her best result being 6th place in the team portable apparatus. Gerrietsen died on 22 June 2024, at the age of 94.
