= Olga Šilhánová =

Czech gymnast

Olympic medal record

Women's gymnastics

Representing Czechoslovakia
Gold medal – first place	1948 London	Team

Olga Šilhánová (21 December 1920 in Vysoké nad Jizerou – 27 August 1986 in Prague) was a Czech gymnast who competed in the 1948 Summer Olympics, winning gold in the team event.
