= Märta Andersson =

Swedish gymnast

Martha Louise “Märta” Andersson (also known as Märta Ingemansson and Märta Karlsson) (14 February 1925 – 2 December 2018) was a Swedish gymnast. She competed in the women's artistic team all-around event at the 1948 Summer Olympics, where the Swedish team finished in the fourth place.
