= Marie Kovářová =

Czech gymnast (1927–2023)

Olympic medal record

Women's gymnastics

Representing Czechoslovakia
Gold medal – first place	1948 London	Team

Marie Ďurovičová (née Kovářová; 11 May 1927 – 4 January 2023) was a Czech gymnast who competed in the 1948 Summer Olympics, winning gold in the team event. She was born in Luleč on 11 May 1927, and died on 4 January 2023, at the age of 95.
