= Thérèse De Grijze =

Belgian gymnast (1926–2005)

Personal information
- Nationality: Belgian
- Born: 24 August 1926; Ostend, Belgium
- Died: 13 December 2005 (aged 79)

Sport
- Sport: Gymnastics

Thérèse De Grijze (24 August 1926 – 13 December 2005) was a Belgian gymnast. She competed in the women's artistic team all-around at the 1948 Summer Olympics.
