= Miloslava Misáková =

Czech gymnast

Olympic medal record

Women's gymnastics

Representing Czechoslovakia
Gold medal – first place	1948 London	Team

Miloslava Misáková (25 February 1922 – 1 July 2015) was a Czech gymnast who competed in the 1948 Summer Olympics, winning gold. She was born in Horákov.
