= Julienne Boudewijns =

Belgian gymnast (1929–1995)

Personal information
- Nationality: Belgian
- Born: 11 August 1929; Antwerp, Belgium
- Died: 27 February 1995; Edegem, Belgium

Sport
- Sport: Gymnastics

Julienne Boudewijns (11 August 1929 – 27 February 1995) was a Belgian gymnast. She competed in the women's artistic team all-around at the 1948 Summer Olympics.
