= Helen Schifano =

American gymnast

Olympic medal record

Women's gymnastics

Representing the United States
Bronze medal – third place	1948 London	Team

Helen Schifano (13 April 1922 – 9 November 2007) was an American gymnast who competed in the 1948 Summer Olympics.
