= Yvonne Van Bets =

Belgian gymnast (born 1928)

Yvonne Van Bets (born 14 December 1928) is a Belgian former gymnast who competed at the 1948 Summer Olympics in London, where she finished 11th and last with her team in the women's all around event. Born in Mechelen, she began training in gymnastics only two years prior to the Games and had to do so in secret while caring for her younger brothers and sisters. She later took part in the 1950 World Artistic Gymnastics Championships and three Belgian national championships before retiring from active competition in 1953 because of a hand injury.
