= Albertine Van Roy-Moens =

Belgian gymnast (1915–1987)

Personal information
- Nationality: Belgian
- Born: 13 October 1915; Willebroek, Belgium
- Died: 21 October 1987 (aged 72); Duffel, Belgium

Sport
- Sport: Gymnastics

Albertine Van Roy-Moens (13 October 1915 – 21 October 1987) was a Belgian gymnast. She competed in the women's artistic team all-around at the 1948 Summer Olympics.
