= Věra Růžičková =

Czech gymnast

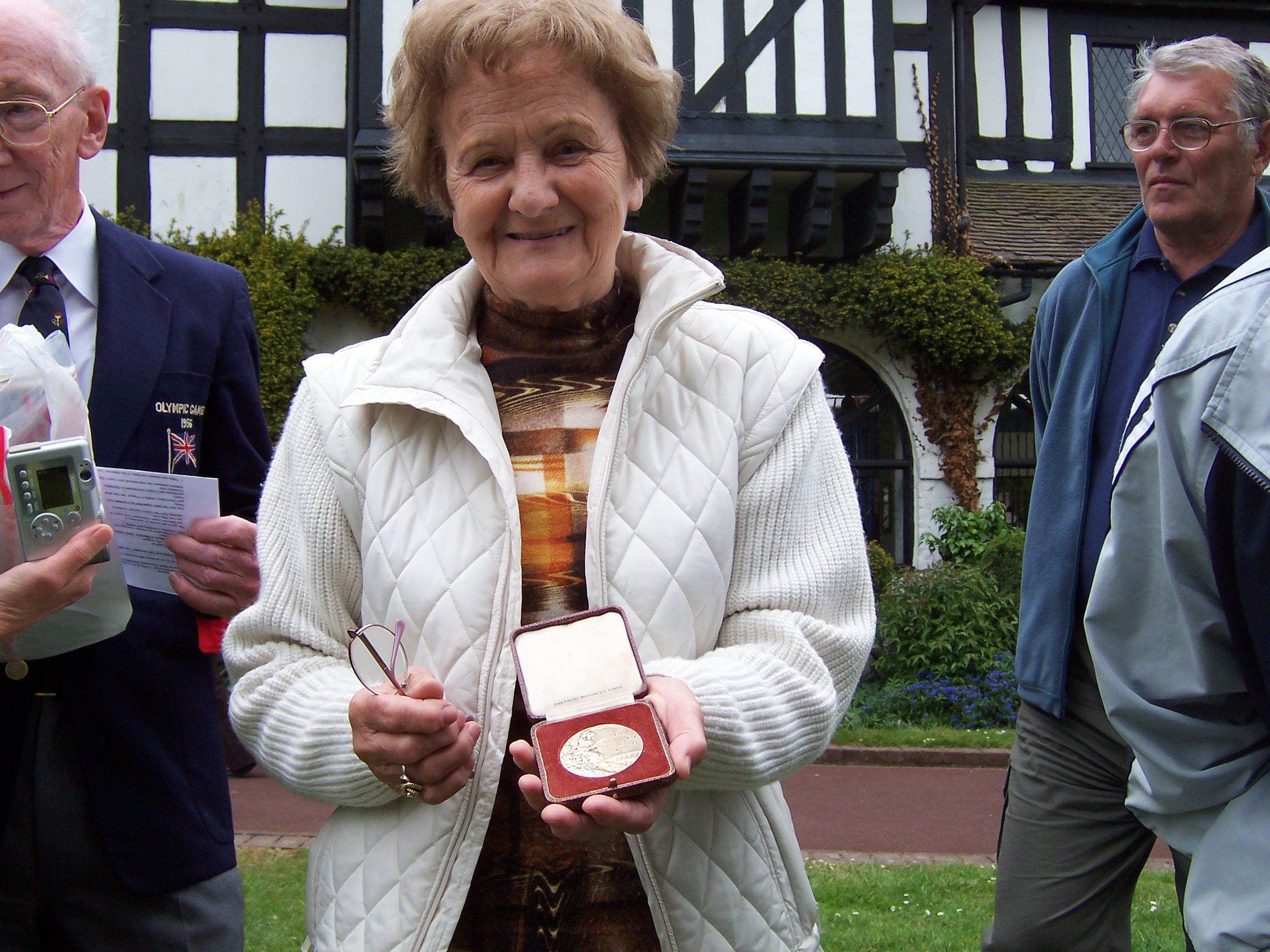
- Růžičková in 2011

Medal record

Women's gymnastics

Representing Czechoslovakia

Olympic Games
Gold medal – first place	1948 London	Team

Věra Růžičková (10 August 1928 – 24 November 2018) was a Czech gymnast who competed in the 1948 Summer Olympics, winning gold in the team event. She was born in Brno.
