= Anna Jordaens =

Belgian gymnast (1927–1996)

Personal information
- Nationality: Belgian
- Born: 20 December 1927; Mortsel, Belgium
- Died: 3 May 1996 (aged 68)

Sport
- Sport: Gymnastics

Anna Jordaens (20 December 1927 – 3 May 1996) was a Belgian gymnast. She competed in the women's artistic team all-around at the 1948 Summer Olympics.
