= Ingrid Andersson (gymnast) =

Swedish gymnast

Personal information
- Nationality: Swedish
- Born: 7 February 1924; Stockholm, Sweden
- Died: 3 January 2005 (aged 80); Stockholm, Sweden

Sport
- Sport: Gymnastics

Elsa Ingrid Andersson (7 February 1924 – 3 January 2005) was a Swedish gymnast. She competed in the women's artistic team all-around event at the 1948 Summer Olympics, in London, where the Swedish team finished in the fourth place.
