= Denise Parmentiers =

Belgian gymnast (1915–1969)

Denise Léonie Gérardine Antoinette Parmentiers
Personal information
- Nationality: Belgian
- Born: 5 July 1915; Liège, Belgium
- Died: 8 April 1969 (aged 53); Seraing, Belgium

Sport
- Sport: Gymnastics

Denise Parmentiers (5 July 1915 – 8 April 1969) was a Belgian gymnast. She competed in the women's artistic team all-around at the 1948 Summer Olympics.
