= Caroline Verbraecken-De Loose =

Belgian gymnast (1924–2001)

Personal information
- Nationality: Belgian
- Born: 26 November 1924; Antwerp, Belgium
- Died: 7 October 2001 (aged 76); Aartselaar, Belgium

Sport
- Sport: Gymnastics

Caroline Verbraecken-De Loose (26 November 1924 – 7 October 2001) was a Belgian gymnast. She competed in the women's artistic team all-around at the 1948 Summer Olympics.
