= Božena Srncová =

Czech gymnast (1925–1997)

Medal record

Women's gymnastics

Representing Czechoslovakia

Olympic Games
Gold medal – first place	1948 London	Team
Bronze medal – third place	1952 Helsinki	Team

Božena Srncová, née Krejcarová (11 June 1925 in Prague – 30 November 1997 in Semily) was a Czech gymnast. She competed in the 1948 Summer Olympics and the 1952 Summer Olympics, winning team event gold and bronze medals, respectively.
