= Ruža Vojsk =

Slovene gymnast (born 1930)

- Full name: Ruža Vojsk
- Born: 31 March 1930 (age 96) Maribor, Kingdom of Yugoslavia

Gymnastics career
- Discipline: Women's artistic gymnastics
- Country represented: Yugoslavia/Slovenia
- Head coaches: Boris Gregorka, Jelica Vazzaz
- Assistant coach: Milica Šepa

Ruža Vojsk OLY (born 31 March 1930), also known as Rose Voisk, is a Slovenian former gymnast. She represented Yugoslavia at the 1948 Summer Olympics in London, finishing seventh with the team and 48th all-around. Following the Olympics, she moved to Germany and then Paris before settling in New York City in 1968. Since 1976, she has attended 11 editions of the Summer and Winter Olympic Games.
