= Jenny Schumacher =

Belgian gymnast (1921–2003)

Personal information
- Nationality: Belgian
- Born: 10 September 1921; Liège, Belgium
- Died: November 2003

Sport
- Sport: Gymnastics

Jenny Schumacher (10 September 1921 – November 2003) was a Belgian gymnast. She competed in the women's artistic team all-around at the 1948 Summer Olympics.
