= Meta Elste-Neumann =

American gymnast

Medal record

Women's gymnastics

Representing United States

Summer Olympics
Bronze medal – third place	1948 London	Women's team competition

Meta Elste-Neumann (October 16, 1919 – October 30, 2010) was born in Bremen, Germany. As Meta Elste, she was a competitor for the United States Women's Olympic Gymnastics team at the 1948 Summer Olympics in London, United Kingdom and the 1952 Summer Olympics in Helsinki Finland.

She won an Olympic bronze medal with the United States team in 1948.

Elste was three when her parents emigrated from Germany and settled in Chicago. She learned her gymnastics at the Lincoln Turner Hall on the north side of the city. She briefly attended Lake View High, but after her father suffered a debilitating stroke she had to drop out at the age 14 to help earn money for her family. She used her gymnastics skills as a member of a traveling circus.

Elste's Olympic opportunities were delayed by World War II, when the Games were cancelled in 1940 and 1944, but in 1948 and 1952 she was well-prepared to compete. In national AAU competition, Elste won the uneven parallel bars in 1947, the floor exercise in 1949, and the balance beam in 1952. She was selected nine times for All-American honors by the AAU.

== See also ==
- Gymnastics at the 1948 Summer Olympics
- United States at the 1948 Summer Olympics
