= Joan Airey =

British gymnast (1926–1994)

Personal information
- Nationality: United Kingdom
- Born: 6 April 1926 Croydon, England
- Died: 16 October 1994 (aged 68) Richmond, London, England

Sport
- Sport: Gymnastics

Joan Winifred Airey-Weedon (4 April 1926 – 16 October 1994) was a British artistic gymnast. She competed in the 1948 Summer Olympics.

Airey represented Regent Street Gymnastics Club and was coached by Lucy Desmond and George Weedon. Following the 1948 Olympics, Airey married Weedon.
