= Hungary at the World Artistic Gymnastics Championships =

- Flag of Hungary
- IOC code: HUN
- Medals: Gold 11 Silver 15 Bronze 8 Total 34

Although Hungarian gymnasts competed at numerous Olympic Games as early as 1896, they competed as Austria-Hungary at the early World Championships in artistic gymnastics. At the 1930 World Championships Hungary competed for the first time as its own nation.

== Medalists ==
Medal	Name	Year	Event
Gold	István Pelle	1930 Luxembourg	Men's horizontal bar
Silver	Miklós Péter	1930 Luxembourg	Men's horizontal bar
Silver	Lenke Balkanyi, Judit Gamauf-Tóth, Anna Kael, Margit Kalocsai, Mária Munkácsi, Jenőné Varga	(Hungary) 1934 Budapest	Women's team
Silver	Margit Kalocsai	(Hungary) 1934 Budapest	Women's all-around
Silver	Eva Banati, Ilona Bánhegyi Milanovits, Irén Daruházi-Karcsics, Erzsébet Gulyás-Köteles, Ágnes Keleti, Alice Kertész, Olga Lemhényi-Tass, Edit Perényi-Weckinger	(Italy) 1954 Rome	Women's team
Gold	Ágnes Keleti	(Italy) 1954 Rome	Women's uneven bars
Bronze	Ágnes Keleti	(Italy) 1954 Rome	Women's balance beam
Bronze	Anikó Ducza	(Czechoslovakia) 1962 Prague	Women's balance beam
Bronze	Krisztina Medveczky, Mónika Császár, Zsuzsa Nagy, Marta Egervari, Zsuzsa Matulai, Ágnes Bánfai	(Bulgaria) 1974 Varna	Women's team
Gold	Zoltán Magyar	(Bulgaria) 1974 Varna	Men's pommel horse
Gold	Zoltán Magyar	(France) 1978 Strasbourg	Men's pommel horse
Gold	Zoltán Magyar	(United States) 1979 Fort Worth	Men's pommel horse
Bronze	György Guczoghy	(Soviet Union) 1981 Moscow	Men's pommel horse
Silver	György Guczoghy	(Hungary) 1983 Budapest	Men's pommel horse
Gold	Zsolt Borkai	(Netherlands) 1987 Rotterdam	Men's pommel horse
Bronze	Zsolt Borkai	(Netherlands) 1987 Rotterdam	Men's horizontal bar
Silver	Henrietta Ónodi	(United States) 1991 Indianapolis	Women's vault
Gold	Henrietta Ónodi	(France) 1992 Paris	Women's vault
Silver	Szilveszter Csollány	(France) 1992 Paris	Men's rings
Silver	Henrietta Ónodi	(France) 1992 Paris	Women's floor exercise
Bronze	Károly Schupkégel	(United Kingdom) 1993 Birmingham	Men's pommel horse
Bronze	Zoltán Supola	(United Kingdom) 1993 Birmingham	Men's horizontal bar
Silver	Zoltán Supola	(Australia) 1994 Brisbane	Men's horizontal bar
Silver	Szilveszter Csollány	(Puerto Rico) 1996 San Juan	Men's rings
Silver	Szilveszter Csollány	(Switzerland) 1997 Lausanne	Men's rings
Silver	Szilveszter Csollány	(China) 1999 Tianjin	Men's rings
Silver	Szilveszter Csollány	(Belgium) 2001 Ghent	Men's rings
Gold	Szilveszter Csollány	(Hungary) 2002 Debrecen	Men's rings
Bronze	Róbert Gál	(Australia) 2005 Melbourne	Men's floor exercise
Silver	Krisztián Berki	(Germany) 2007 Stuttgart	Men's pommel horse
Silver	Krisztián Berki	(United Kingdom) 2009 London	Men's pommel horse
Gold	Krisztián Berki	(Netherlands) 2010 Rotterdam	Men's pommel horse
Gold	Krisztián Berki	(Japan) 2011 Tokyo	Men's pommel horse
Gold	Krisztián Berki	(China) 2014 Nanning	Men's pommel horse

== Medal tables ==
=== By gender ===
Gender	Gold	Silver	Bronze	Total
Men	9	10	5	24
Women	2	5	3	10

=== By event ===
Event	Gold	Silver	Bronze	Total
Men's pommel horse	7	3	2	12
Men's rings	1	5	0	6
Men's horizontal bar	1	2	2	5
Women's vault	1	1	0	2
Women's uneven bars	1	0	0	1
Women's team	0	2	1	3
Women's floor exercise	0	1	0	1
Women's individual all-around	0	1	0	1
Women's balance beam	0	0	2	2
Men's floor exercise	0	0	1	1
Men's individual all-around	0	0	0	0
Men's parallel bars	0	0	0	0
Men's team	0	0	0	0
Men's vault	0	0	0	0

== Junior World medalists ==
Medal	Name	Year	Event
Bronze	Krisztián Balázs	(Hungary) 2019 Győr	Boys' horizontal bar
Bronze	Szilárd Závory	(Turkey) 2023 Antalya	Boys' vault

== See also ==
- Hungary women's national artistic gymnastics team
- List of Olympic female artistic gymnasts for Hungary
