= Team portable apparatus at the Olympics =

Former Olympic sport

Team portable apparatus at the Olympic Games

Overview
- Sport: Artistic gymnastics
- Gender: Women
- Years held: 1952–1956

Reigning champion
- Women: Hungary

The team portable apparatus was an artistic gymnastics event held at the Summer Olympics. It was only held at the 1952 and 1956 Olympic Games. While it is no longer officially contested, it did contain many similarities to modern day rhythmic gymnastics.

== Medalists ==
Games	Gold	Silver	Bronze
1952 Helsinki	Sweden; Karin Lindberg; Ann-Sofi Pettersson; Evy Berggren; Gun Roring; Göta Pettersson; Ingrid Sandahl; Hjördis Nordin; Vanja Blomberg	Soviet Union; Nina Bocharova; Pelageya Danilova; Maria Gorokhovskaya; Medea Jugeli; Ekaterina Kalinchuk; Galina Minaicheva; Galina Shamrai; Galina Urbanovich	Hungary; Andrea Bodó; Irén Daruházi-Karcsics; Erzsébet Gulyás-Köteles; Ágnes Keleti; Margit Korondi; Edit Perényi-Weckinger; Olga Tass; Mária Kövi-Zalai
1956 Melbourne	Hungary; Erzsébet Gulyás-Köteles; Ágnes Keleti; Alice Kertész; Margit Korondi; Olga Lemhényi-Tass; Andrea Molnár-Bodó	Sweden; Karin Lindberg; Ann-Sofi Pettersson; Eva Rönström; Evy Berggren; Doris Hedberg; Maud Karlén	Soviet Union; Polina Astakhova; Lyudmila Yegorova; Lidia Kalinina; Larisa Latynina; Tamara Manina; Sofia Muratova Poland; Helena Rakoczy; Natalia Kot; Danuta Nowak-Stachow; Dorota Horzonek-Jokiel; Barbara Wilk-Ślizowska; Lidia Szczerbińska

=== Team medal counts ===
Rank	Nation	Gold	Silver	Bronze	Total
1	Sweden	1	1	0	2
2	Hungary	1	0	1	2
3	Soviet Union	0	1	1	2
4	Poland	0	0	1	1
