= List of Olympic female artistic gymnasts for Hungary =

Gymnastics events have been staged at the Olympic Games since 1896. Hungarian female gymnasts have participated in every Summer Olympics since 1928, except for 1932 and 1984. A total of 50 female gymnasts have represented Hungary. Hungarian women have won 23 medals at the Olympics – 5 in team all-around, 2 in team portable apparatus, 2 in individual all-around, 2 in balance beam, 5 in floor exercise, 5 in uneven bars, and 2 in vault. The medals include 7 golds.

Five Hungarian female gymnasts have won at least four medals at the Olympic Games: Ágnes Keleti (10), Margit Korondi (8), Olga Lemhényi-Tass (6), Erzsébet Gulyás-Köteles (5), and Andrea Molnár-Bodó (4).

Ágnes Keleti competed at the 1952 and 1956 Olympics and won 10 total medals, more than any other Hungarian female gymnast. She won four medals in 1952, including the floor exercise gold, and then followed that up by winning six medals in 1956, including golds on balance beam, floor exercise, and uneven bars. Margit Korondi also competed at the 1952 and 1956 Games. She won six medals in 1952 and two in 1956.

From 1948 to 1960, Olga Lemhényi-Tass competed at four Olympic Games, the most of any Hungarian female gymnast. She won six total medals. Erzsébet Gulyás-Köteles participated in three Olympics from 1948 to 1956 and won five total medals. Andrea Molnár-Bodó won four total medals at the 1952 and 1956 Games.

After 1956, no Hungarian female gymnast won a gold medal until 1992. That year, Henrietta Ónodi earned two medals, including the gold in vault.

== Gymnasts ==
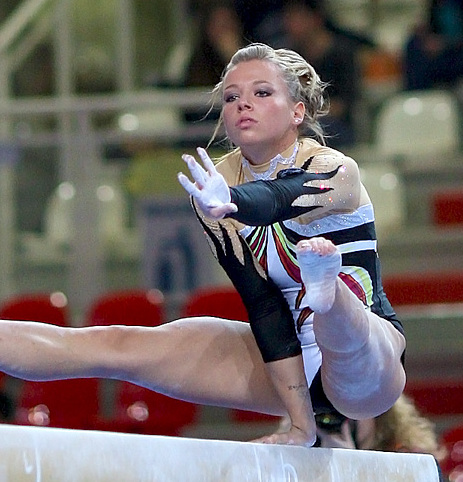
Dorina Böczögő

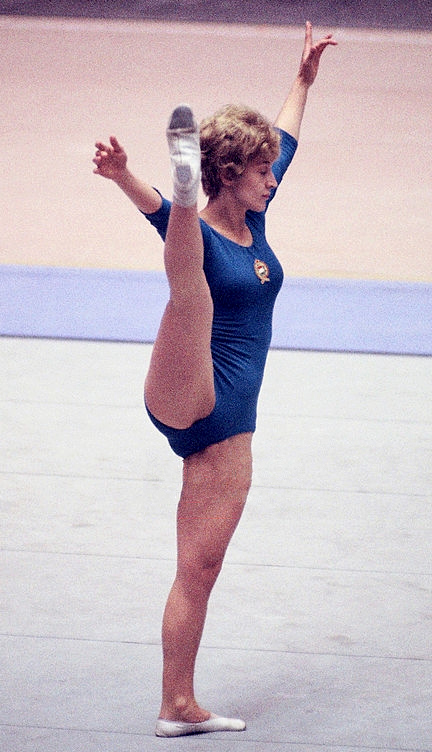
Aniko Ducza-Janosi

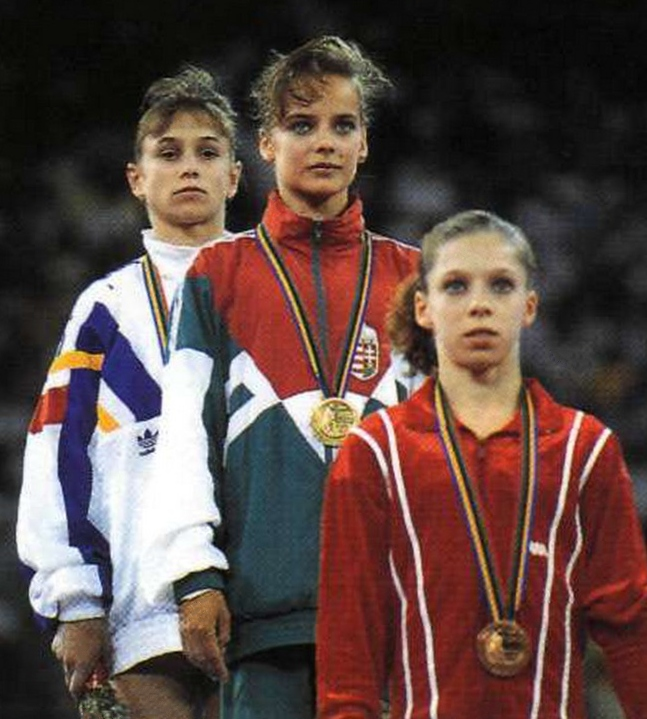
Henrietta Ónodi (centre)

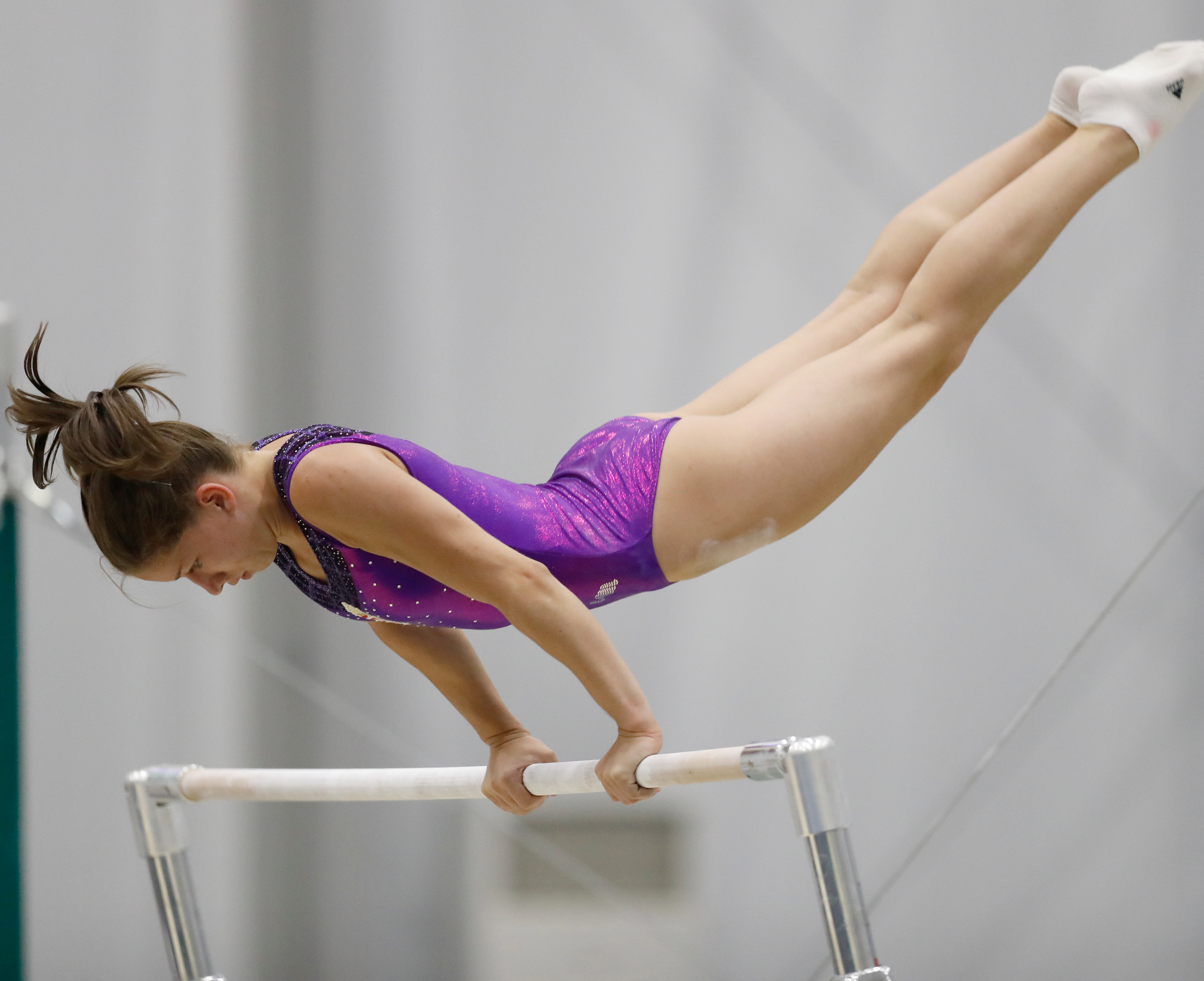
Zsofia Kovacs

| Gymnast | Years | Gold | Silver | Bronze | Total medals | Ref. |
|---|---|---|---|---|---|---|
| Lenke Almási | 1980 | 0 | 0 | 0 | 0 | |
| Csenge Bácskay | 2024 | 0 | 0 | 0 | 0 | |
| Ildikó Balog | 1992, 1996 | 0 | 0 | 0 | 0 | |
| Bernadett Balázs | 1992 | 0 | 0 | 0 | 0 | |
| Mária Bencsik | 1960 | 0 | 0 | 0 | 0 | |
| Ágnes Bánfai | 1968 | 0 | 0 | 0 | 0 | |
| Ilona Békési | 1968, 1972 | 0 | 0 | 1 | 1 | |
| Dorina Böczögő | 2008, 2012 | 0 | 0 | 0 | 0 | |
| Zsuzsa Csisztu | 1988 | 0 | 0 | 0 | 0 | |
| Erika Csányi | 1980 | 0 | 0 | 0 | 0 | |
| Mónika Császár | 1972 | 0 | 0 | 1 | 1 | |
| Bettina Lili Czifra | 2024 | 0 | 0 | 0 | 0 | |
| Irén Daruházi-Karcsics | 1948, 1952 | 0 | 2 | 1 | 3 | |
| Anikó Ducza-Jánosi | 1960, 1964, 1968 | 0 | 0 | 1 | 1 | |
| Márta Egervári | 1976, 1980 | 0 | 0 | 1 | 1 | |
| Erika Flander | 1980 | 0 | 0 | 0 | 0 | |
| Klára Förstner | 1960 | 0 | 0 | 0 | 0 | |
| Judit Füle | 1960 | 0 | 0 | 0 | 0 | |
| Erzsébet Gulyás-Köteles | 1948, 1952, 1956 | 1 | 3 | 1 | 5 | |
| Erzsébet Hanti | 1980 | 0 | 0 | 0 | 0 | |
| Kinga Horváth | 1992 | 0 | 0 | 0 | 0 | |
| Márta Kelemen | 1972, 1976 | 0 | 0 | 1 | 1 | |
| Ágnes Keleti | 1952, 1956 | 5 | 3 | 2 | 10 | |
| Alice Kertész | 1956 | 1 | 1 | 0 | 2 | |
| Margit Korondi | 1952, 1956 | 2 | 2 | 4 | 8 | |
| Zsófia Kovács | 2016, 2020 | 0 | 0 | 0 | 0 | |
| Nikolett Krausz | 1996 | 0 | 0 | 0 | 0 | |
| Anikó Kéry | 1972 | 0 | 0 | 1 | 1 | |
| Andrea Ladányi | 1988 | 0 | 0 | 0 | 0 | |
| Olga Lemhényi-Tass | 1948, 1952, 1956, 1960 | 1 | 3 | 2 | 6 | |
| Mária Lővey | 1976 | 0 | 0 | 0 | 0 | |
| Katalin Makray | 1964, 1968 | 0 | 1 | 0 | 1 | |
| Krisztina Medveczky | 1972, 1976 | 0 | 0 | 1 | 1 | |
| Zsuzsa Miskó | 1988 | 0 | 0 | 0 | 0 | |
| Ágnes Miskó | 1988 | 0 | 0 | 0 | 0 | |
| Andrea Molnár | 1992, 1996 | 0 | 0 | 0 | 0 | |
| Krisztina Molnár | 1992 | 0 | 0 | 0 | 0 | |
| Andrea Molnár-Bodó | 1952, 1956 | 1 | 2 | 1 | 4 | |
| Gyöngyi Mák-Kovács | 1964 | 0 | 0 | 0 | 0 | |
| Katalin Müller-Száll | 1960, 1964, 1968 | 0 | 0 | 0 | 0 | |
| Zsuzsa Nagy | 1972 | 0 | 0 | 1 | 1 | |
| Adrienn Nyeste | 1996, 2000 | 0 | 0 | 0 | 0 | |
| Henrietta Ónodi | 1992, 1996 | 1 | 1 | 0 | 2 | |
| Éva Óvári | 1976, 1980 | 0 | 0 | 0 | 0 | |
| Eszter Óváry | 1988, 1996 | 0 | 0 | 0 | 0 | |
| Edit Perényi-Weckinger | 1948, 1952 | 0 | 2 | 1 | 3 | |
| Beáta Storczer | 1988 | 0 | 0 | 0 | 0 | |
| Krisztina Szarka | 2004 | 0 | 0 | 0 | 0 | |
| Zója Székely | 2024 | 0 | 0 | 0 | 0 | |
| Márta Tolnai-Erdős | 1964, 1968 | 0 | 0 | 0 | 0 | |
| Mária Tressel | 1964 | 0 | 0 | 0 | 0 | |
| Margit Tóth | 1976 | 0 | 0 | 0 | 0 | |
| Adrienn Varga | 1996 | 0 | 0 | 0 | 0 | |
| Mária Zalai-Kövi | 1948, 1952 | 0 | 2 | 1 | 3 | |

== Medalists ==
| Medal | Name | Year | Event |
|---|---|---|---|
| Bronze | Csillik, Kalocsai, Madary, Mészáros, Nagy, Törös, Tóth, Voit | (Germany) 1936 Berlin | Women's team |
| Silver | Weckinger, Zalai-Kövi, Karcsics, Gulyás-Köteles, Balázs, Tass, Fehér, Nagy-Sándor | (United Kingdom) 1948 London | Women's team |
| Silver | Bodó, Daruházi-Karcsics, Gulyás-Köteles, Keleti, Korondi, Weckinger, Tass, Kövi-Zalai | (Finland) 1952 Helsinki | Women's team |
| Bronze | Bodó, Daruházi-Karcsics, Gulyás-Köteles, Keleti, Korondi, Weckinger, Tass, Kövi-Zalai | (Finland) 1952 Helsinki | Women's team portable apparatus |
| Bronze | Margit Korondi | (Finland) 1952 Helsinki | Women's all-around |
| Gold | Margit Korondi | (Finland) 1952 Helsinki | Women's uneven bars |
| Bronze | Ágnes Keleti | (Finland) 1952 Helsinki | Women's uneven bars |
| Bronze | Margit Korondi | (Finland) 1952 Helsinki | Women's balance beam |
| Gold | Ágnes Keleti | (Finland) 1952 Helsinki | Women's floor exercise |
| Bronze | Margit Korondi | (Finland) 1952 Helsinki | Women's floor exercise |
| Silver | Molnár-Bodó, Gulyás-Köteles, Keleti, Kertész, Korondi, Tass | (Australia) 1956 Melbourne | Women's team |
| Gold | Molnár-Bodó, Gulyás-Köteles, Keleti, Kertész, Korondi, Tass | (Australia) 1956 Melbourne | Women's team portable apparatus |
| Silver | Ágnes Keleti | (Australia) 1956 Melbourne | Women's all-around |
| Bronze | Olga Tass | (Australia) 1956 Melbourne | Women's vault |
| Gold | Ágnes Keleti | (Australia) 1956 Melbourne | Women's uneven bars |
| Gold | Ágnes Keleti | (Australia) 1956 Melbourne | Women's balance beam |
| Gold | Ágnes Keleti | (Australia) 1956 Melbourne | Women's floor exercise |
| Silver | Katalin Makray | (Japan) 1964 Tokyo | Women's uneven bars |
| Bronze | Békési, Császár, Kelemen, Kéry, Medveczky, Nagy | (Germany) 1972 Munich | Women's team |
| Bronze | Márta Egervári | (Canada) 1976 Montreal | Women's uneven bars |
| Gold | Henrietta Ónodi | (Spain) 1992 Barcelona | Women's vault |
| Silver | Henrietta Ónodi | (Spain) 1992 Barcelona | Women's floor exercise |
