= List of Olympic medal leaders in women's gymnastics =

Gymnastics events have been staged at the Olympic Games since 1896. Since then, 30 female gymnasts have won at least five total medals. The country with the most athletes on this list is the Soviet Union, with nine. Romania (6), United States (6), Hungary (4), East Germany (2), Russia (2), Brazil (1), and Czechoslovakia (1) are also represented.

Nine female gymnasts have won at least eight medals at the Olympic Games: Larisa Latynina (18), Věra Čáslavská (11), Simone Biles (11), Ágnes Keleti (10), Polina Astakhova (10), Nadia Comăneci (9), Ludmilla Tourischeva (9), Margit Korondi (8) and Sofia Muratova (8).

Larisa Latynina and Polina Astakhova each competed for the Soviet Union in 1956, 1960, and 1964. Latynina has the most medals of any female athlete in Olympic history, with 18. She won six medals in each Olympic Games that she competed in, winning the individual all-around titles in 1956 and 1960. Astakhova won two medals in 1956, four medals in 1960, and four medals in 1964. She won the uneven bars golds in 1960 and 1964. Sofia Muratova was Latynina's and Astakhova's teammate in 1956 and 1960. Muratova won a total of eight medals. Ludmilla Tourischeva also competed for the Soviet Union. She won one medal in 1968, four medals in 1972, and four medals in 1976.

Ágnes Keleti and Margit Korondi both competed for Hungary in 1956 and 1960. Keleti won 10 medals, including two golds on floor exercise. Korondi won eight total medals.

Czechoslovakia's Věra Čáslavská won 11 total Olympic medals, the second-most of any female gymnast. She won one in 1960, four in 1964, and six in 1968. She won the individual all-around golds in 1964 and 1968. She holds the record for the most individual gold medals (with 7, all her golds are individual). She remains the only gymnast, male or female, to have won an Olympic gold medal in each individual event.

Nadia Comăneci, who competed for Romania in 1976 and 1980, won nine medals. In 1976, she became the first gymnast to earn a perfect 10 at the Olympic Games and eventually achieved that mark seven times during the Games. She also won the individual all-around gold that year.

Gymnasts
Rank	Gymnast	Nation	Years	Gold	Silver	Bronze	Total medals	Ref.
1	Larisa Latynina	Soviet Union	1956, 1960, 1964	9	5	4	18	
2	Věra Čáslavská	Czechoslovakia	1960, 1964, 1968	7	4	0	11	
3	Simone Biles	United States	2016, 2020, 2024	7	2	2	11	
4	Ágnes Keleti	Hungary	1952, 1956	5	3	2	10	
5	Polina Astakhova	Soviet Union	1956, 1960, 1964	5	2	3	10	
6	Nadia Comăneci	Romania	1976, 1980	5	3	1	9	
7	Ludmilla Tourischeva	Soviet Union	1968, 1972, 1976	4	3	2	9	
8	Margit Korondi	Hungary	1952, 1956	2	2	4	8	
8	Sofia Muratova	Soviet Union	1956, 1960	2	2	4	8	
10	Simona Amânar	Romania	1996, 2000	3	1	3	7	
11	Maria Gorokhovskaya	Soviet Union	1952	2	5	0	7	
12	Svetlana Khorkina	Russia	1996, 2000, 2004	2	4	1	7	
13	Karin Büttner-Janz	East Germany	1968, 1972	2	3	2	7	
14	Shannon Miller	United States	1992, 1996	2	2	3	7	
14	Aliya Mustafina	Russia	2012, 2016	2	2	3	7	
16	Nellie Kim	Soviet Union	1976, 1980	5	1	0	6	
17	Olga Korbut	Soviet Union	1972, 1976	4	2	0	6	
18	Daniela Silivaș	Romania	1988	3	2	1	6	
18	Aly Raisman	United States	2012, 2016	3	2	1	6	
20	Tamara Manina	Soviet Union	1956, 1964	2	3	1	6	
20	Rebeca Andrade	Brazil	2016, 2020, 2024	2	3	1	6	
22	Lavinia Miloșovici	Romania	1992, 1996	2	1	3	6	
22	Sunisa Lee	United States	2020, 2024	2	1	3	6	
24	Olga Lemhényi-Tass	Hungary	1948, 1952, 1956	1	3	2	6	
25	Ecaterina Szabo	Romania	1984	4	1	0	5	
26	Svetlana Boginskaya	Soviet Union; Unified Team	1988, 1992	3	1	1	5	
26	Cătălina Ponor	Romania	2004, 2012, 2016	3	1	1	5	
28	Erzsébet Gulyás-Köteles	Hungary	1948, 1952, 1956	1	3	1	5	
28	Nastia Liukin	United States	2008	1	3	1	5	
30	Mary Lou Retton	United States	1984	1	2	2	5	

== See also ==
- List of multiple Olympic gold medalists
- List of multiple Olympic medalists
- List of Olympic medalists in gymnastics (women)
- List of top female medalists at major artistic gymnastics events
- List of female artistic gymnasts with the most appearances at Olympic Games
