= List of female artistic gymnasts with the most appearances at Olympic Games =

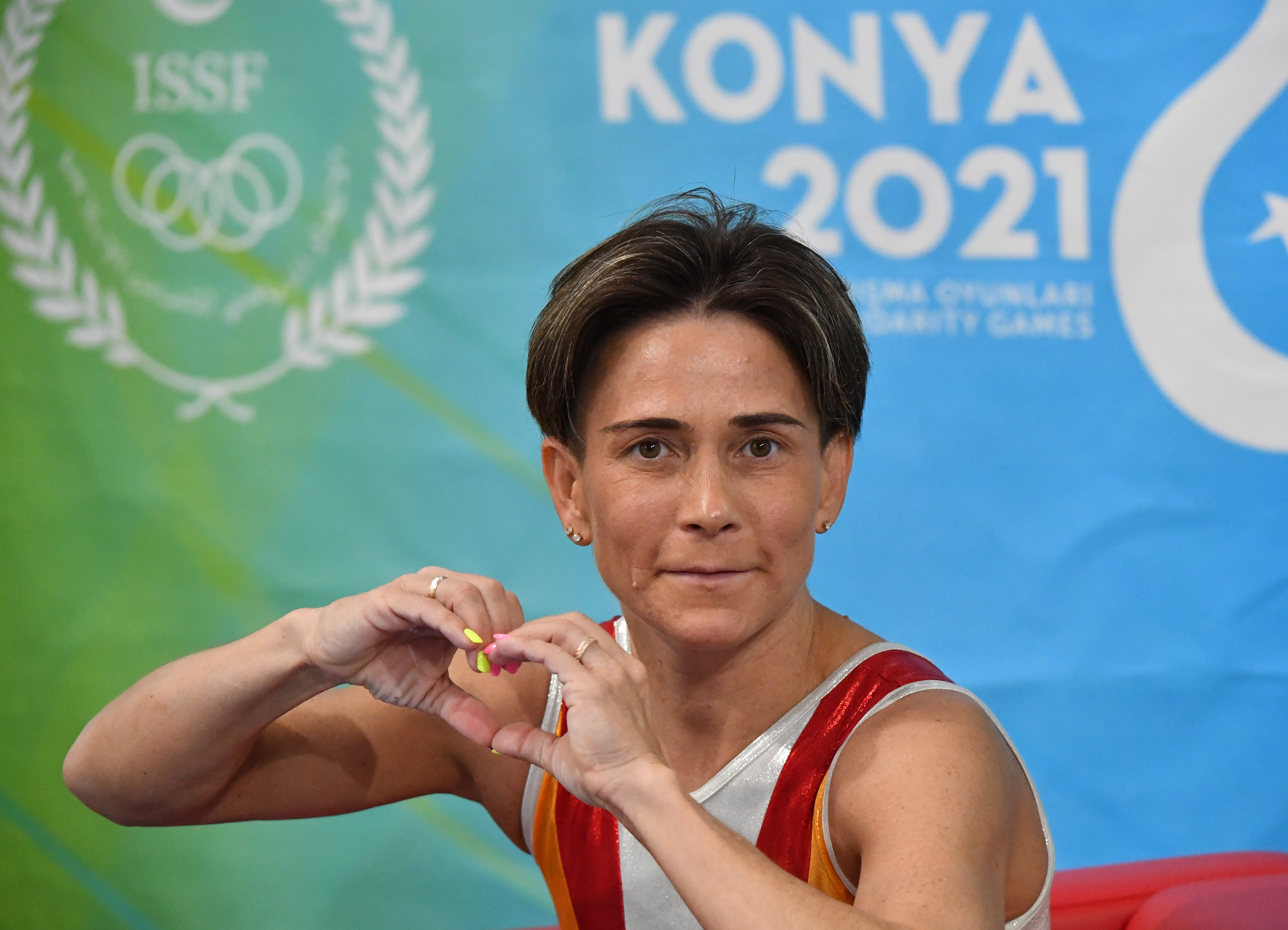
Oksana Chusovitina has competed at 8 Olympic Games, the most of any female artistic gymnast

Women have competed in artistic gymnastics at the Olympic Games since 1928. While many women artistic gymnasts have competed in multiple Olympic Games, only five have competed in at least four separate Games: Oksana Chusovitina (8), Daniele Hypólito (5), Olga Tass (4), Vanessa Ferrari (4), and Ellie Black (4).

Gymnasts
| Rank | Gymnast | Nation | Olympics | Total | Ref. |
|---|---|---|---|---|---|
| 1 | Oksana Chusovitina | Unified Team; Uzbekistan; Germany | 1992, 1996, 2000, 2004, 2008, 2012, 2016, 2020 | 8 | |
| 2 | Daniele Hypólito | Brazil | 2000, 2004, 2008, 2012, 2016 | 5 | |
| 3 | Ellie Black | Canada | 2012, 2016, 2020, 2024 | 4 | |
| 3 | Vanessa Ferrari | Italy | 2008, 2012, 2016, 2020 | 4 | |
| 3 | Olga Tass | Hungary | 1948, 1952, 1956, 1960 | 4 | |
| 6 | Rebeca Andrade | Brazil | 2016, 2020, 2024 | 3 | |
| 6 | Polina Astakhova | Soviet Union | 1956, 1960, 1964 | 3 | |
| 6 | Jade Barbosa | Brazil | 2008, 2016, 2024 | 3 | |
| 6 | Monica Bergamelli | Italy | 2000, 2004, 2008 | 3 | |
| 6 | Simone Biles | United States | 2016, 2020, 2024 | 3 | |
| 6 | Svetlana Boginskaya | Soviet Union; Unified Team; Belarus | 1988, 1992, 1996 | 3 | |
| 6 | Marine Boyer | France | 2016, 2020, 2024 | 3 | |
| 6 | Kim Bui | Germany | 2012, 2016, 2020 | 3 | |
| 6 | Simona Castro | Chile | 2012, 2016, 2020 | 3 | |
| 6 | Miranda Cicognani | Italy | 1952, 1956, 1960 | 3 | |
| 6 | Esbela da Fonseca | Portugal | 1960, 1964, 1968 | 3 | |
| 6 | Dominique Dawes | United States | 1992, 1996, 2000 | 3 | |
| 6 | Nina Derwael | Belgium | 2016, 2020, 2024 | 3 | |
| 6 | Ivanka Dolzheva | Bulgaria | 1952, 1956, 1960 | 3 | |
| 6 | Daiane dos Santos | Brazil | 2004, 2008, 2012 | 3 | |
| 6 | Becky Downie | Great Britain | 2008, 2016, 2024 | 3 | |
| 6 | Anikó Ducza | Hungary | 1960, 1964, 1968 | 3 | |
| 6 | Solveig Egman | Sweden | 1960, 1964, 1968 | 3 | |
| 6 | Sherine El-Zeiny | Egypt | 2008, 2012, 2016 | 3 | |
| 6 | Rayna Grigorova | Bulgaria | 1952, 1960, 1964 | 3 | |
| 6 | Muriel Grossfeld | United States | 1956, 1960, 1964 | 3 | |
| 6 | Erzsébet Gulyás-Köteles | Hungary | 1948, 1952, 1956 | 3 | |
| 6 | Pat Hirst | Great Britain | 1948, 1952, 1956 | 3 | |
| 6 | Sonia Iovan | Romania | 1956, 1960, 1964 | 3 | |
| 6 | Svetlana Khorkina | Russia | 1996, 2000, 2004 | 3 | |
| 6 | Larisa Latynina | Soviet Union | 1956, 1960, 1964 | 3 | |
| 6 | Elena Leușteanu | Romania | 1956, 1960, 1964 | 3 | |
| 6 | Karin Lindberg | Sweden | 1948, 1952, 1956 | 3 | |
| 6 | Jessica López | Venezuela | 2008, 2012, 2016 | 3 | |
| 6 | Marie Lundqvist | Sweden | 1964, 1968, 1972 | 3 | |
| 6 | Ana Filipa Martins | Portugal | 2016, 2020, 2024 | 3 | |
| 6 | Matylda Matoušková-Šínová | Czechoslovakia | 1952, 1956, 1960 | 3 | |
| 6 | Miyuki Matsuhisa | Japan | 1968, 1972, 1976 | 3 | |
| 6 | Teresa McDonnell | Canada | 1968, 1972, 1976 | 3 | |
| 6 | Linda Metheny | United States | 1964, 1968, 1972 | 3 | |
| 6 | Vasiliki Millousi | Greece | 2000, 2012, 2016 | 3 | |
| 6 | Alexa Moreno | Mexico | 2016, 2020, 2024 | 3 | |
| 6 | Katalin Müller-Száll | Hungary | 1960, 1964, 1968 | 3 | |
| 6 | Gaelle Mys | Belgium | 2008, 2012, 2016 | 3 | |
| 6 | Marianna Némethová-Krajčírová | Czechoslovakia | 1964, 1968, 1972 | 3 | |
| 6 | Cătălina Ponor | Romania | 2004, 2012, 2016 | 3 | |
| 6 | Flávia Saraiva | Brazil | 2016, 2020, 2024 | 3 | |
| 6 | Pauline Schäfer | Germany | 2016, 2020, 2024 | 3 | |
| 6 | Elisabeth Seitz | Germany | 2012, 2016, 2020 | 3 | |
| 6 | Lisa Skinner | Australia | 1996, 2000, 2004 | 3 | |
| 6 | Saltirka Spasova-Tarpova | Bulgaria | 1952, 1956, 1960 | 3 | |
| 6 | Ute Starke | United Team of Germany; East Germany | 1960, 1964, 1968 | 3 | |
| 6 | Giulia Steingruber | Switzerland | 2012, 2016, 2020 | 3 | |
| 6 | Keiko Tanaka-Ikeda | Japan | 1968, 1972, 1976 | 3 | |
| 6 | Ludmilla Tourischeva | Soviet Union | 1968, 1972, 1976 | 3 | |
| 6 | Beth Tweddle | Great Britain | 2004, 2008, 2012 | 3 | |
| 6 | Emilia Vătășoiu | Romania | 1956, 1960, 1964 | 3 | |
| 6 | Lieke Wevers | Netherlands | 2016, 2020, 2024 | 3 | |
| 6 | Sanne Wevers | Netherlands | 2016, 2020, 2024 | 3 | |

== See also ==
- List of Olympic medal leaders in women's gymnastics
- List of top female medalists at major artistic gymnastics events
- List of male artistic gymnasts with the most appearances at Olympic Games
