= Li Li (gymnast) =

Chinese artistic gymnast

- Born: February 26, 1975 (age 51) Xingning, Guangdong

Gymnastics career
- Discipline: Women's artistic gymnastics
- Country represented: China
- Eponymous skills: "Li Li" (uneven bars) "Li Li" (balance beam)
- Retired: 1994
Medal record
Representing China
World Cup Final
Silver medal – second place	1990 Brussels	Balance Beam
Goodwill Games
Bronze medal – third place	1990 Seattle	Team
Asian Games
Gold medal – first place	1990 Beijing	Team
Silver medal – second place	1990 Beijing	Uneven Bars
National Games
Gold medal – first place	1993 Beijing	Balance Beam

Li Li (李莉, born February 26, 1975, in Xingning County, Guangdong Province) is an artistic gymnast from China. She competed during the early 1990s, and retired in 1994. An Olympian, World Cup medallist and national champion, the beam was her best apparatus. Here, she pioneered the exceptionally difficult and innovative 1 1/4 turn on back in kip position, to which the skill is named after her. No other gymnast has been able to perform the maneuver with as many spins.

== Career ==
Li made her international debut at the 1990 Goodwill Games in Seattle, USA, where she wowed the world with her trademark 1 1/4 back spin on the beam, as well as a rare German giant into a Tkatchev on the uneven bars. Later the same year, she won one gold (team) and silver (bars) at the Asian Games, followed by another silver (beam) at the World Cup (her teammate Yang Bo took the gold). The following year, she competed at the 1991 World Championships in Indianapolis, where the Chinese team placed fourth.

At the 1992 Olympic Games, Li finished 14th in the all-around, and made the bars final where she placed eighth (9.887). Her teammate Lu Li won the gold with a perfect 10.0, one of only two 10s awarded at those games. Again, the Chinese women finished fourth in the team competition.

Li Li took the early lead in the all-around of the 1993 World Championships in Birmingham after performing on her best event, the beam. She stunned the crowd with a Yurchenko loop followed by the 1 1/4 back spin, and scored 9.837, the second-highest score awarded on that night (Tatiana Lysenko got a 9.862 on her first vault). Li finished in ninth place overall. She was in contention to win the beam gold in the event finals, but after a mistake on her Yang Bo jump, she decided to duplicate the element and, as a result, went over time, which cost her two-tenths of a point and dropped her to fourth place (9.600). Without the deduction, she would have taken the silver. Another favorite for the gold, Shannon Miller, had a disastrous performance, falling from the beam twice and sitting on her dismount (7.850). The gold went to Lavinia Miloșovici (9.850), who had a simple and plain routine in comparison to Miller's and Li Li's.

Li went on to win the beam title in the 1993 East Asian Games and also the 1993 Chinese National Games. She was in the 1994 World Championships in Brisbane but failed to make the beam final, earning a 9.237. She retired from the sport soon after.

She is now a women's gymnastics coach at Buckeye Gymnastics in Westerville, Ohio.

There has been some investigation into her actual birthdate, which may have been altered to allow her to compete in competitions she would not have been age-eligible for.

== Eponymous skills ==
Li has three eponymous skills listed in the Code of Points.

Apparatus	Name	Description	Difficulty (Note: Valid for the 2025–2028 Code of Points)
Uneven bars	Li Li	Clear rear pike support (legs together) on high bar – full circle swing backward with stoop out backward to hang on high bar	C (0.3)
Uneven bars	Li Li II	Clear rear pike support (legs together) on high bar – full circle swing backward with counter flight backward straddled	D (0.4)
Balance beam	Li Li	1¼ (450°) turn on back in kip position (hip-leg angle closed)	D (0.4)

== Competition history ==
Year	Event	TF	AA	VT	UB	BB	FX
1990
1990	Asian Games	1st place, gold medalist(s)			2nd place, silver medalist(s)		
1990	Cottbus International		3rd place, bronze medalist(s)		1st place, gold medalist(s)		
1990	Goodwill Games		10		8	5	
1990	World Cup Final		10			2nd place, silver medalist(s)	
1991	East Asian Championships	1st place, gold medalist(s)	2nd place, silver medalist(s)			1st place, gold medalist(s)	
1991	Li Ning Cup		2nd place, silver medalist(s)				
1991	Tokyo Cup				3rd place, bronze medalist(s)		
1991	World Sports Fair		1st place, gold medalist(s)		1st place, gold medalist(s)	1st place, gold medalist(s)	3rd place, bronze medalist(s)
1991	World Championships	4	9		6		
1992	Chinese Championships		4				
1992	DTB Cup		4			2nd place, silver medalist(s)	
1992	Gander Memorial		3rd place, bronze medalist(s)				
1992	Olympic Games	4	14		8		
1992	Swiss Cup	4					
1993
1993	East Asian Games	1st place, gold medalist(s)	2nd place, silver medalist(s)			1st place, gold medalist(s)	4
1993	World Championships		9			4	
