= Gymnastics at the 1992 Summer Olympics – Women's balance beam =

Women's balance beam at the Games of the XXV Olympiad
- Pictogram for Gymnastics
- Venue: Palau Sant Jordi
- Date: 28 July – 1 August 1992
- Competitors: 92 from 24 nations

Medalists
1st place, gold medalist(s)		Tatiana Lysenko	Unified Team
2nd place, silver medalist(s)		Lu Li	China
2nd place, silver medalist(s)		Shannon Miller	United States

These are the results of the women's balance beam competition, one of six events for female competitors in artistic gymnastics at the 1992 Summer Olympics in Barcelona. The qualification and final rounds took place on July 28 and August 1 at the Palau Sant Jordi.

== Results ==
=== Qualification ===
Ninety gymnasts competed in the balance beam event during the compulsory and optional rounds on July 26 and 28. The eight highest scoring gymnasts advanced to the final on August 1. Each country was limited to two competitors in the final.

Rank	Gymnast	Score
1	Lu Li (CHN)	19.812
2	Svetlana Boginskaya (EUN)	19.800
3	Tatiana Lysenko (EUN)	19.787
3	Shannon Miller (USA)	19.787
5	Cristina Bontaș (ROU)	19.762
6	Yang Bo (CHN)	19.725
7	Betty Okino (USA)	19.712
13	Lavinia Miloșovici (ROU)	19.637

=== Final ===
Rank	Gymnast	Score
Gold medal	Tatiana Lysenko (EUN)	9.975
Silver medal	Lu Li (CHN)	9.912
Silver medal	Shannon Miller (USA)	9.912
4	Cristina Bontaș (ROU)	9.875
5	Svetlana Boginskaya (EUN)	9.862
6	Betty Okino (USA)	9.837
7	Yang Bo (CHN)	9.300
8	Lavinia Miloșovici (ROU)	9.262
