= Gymnastics at the 1992 Summer Olympics – Women's vault =

Women's vault at the Games of the XXV Olympiad
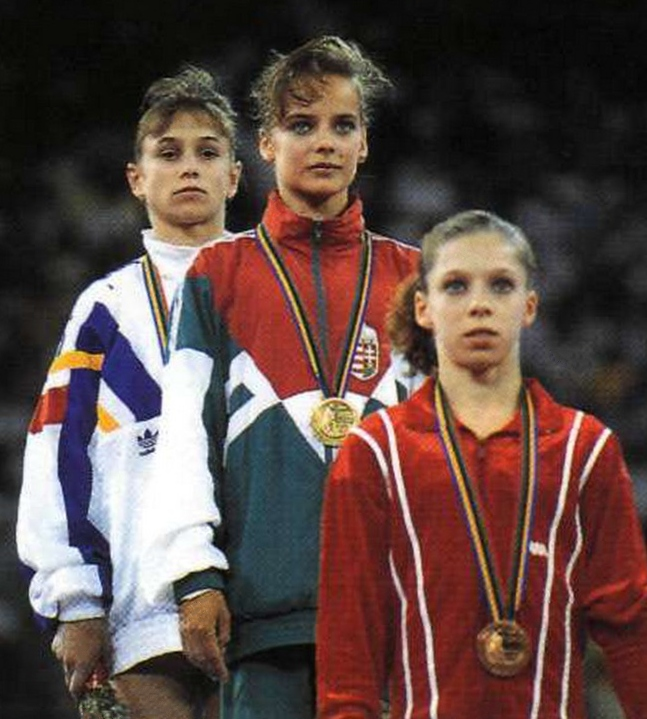
- Left-right: Miloşovici, Ónodi, Lysenko
- Venue: Palau Sant Jordi
- Date: 28 July – 1 August 1992
- Competitors: 92 from 24 nations

Medalists
1st place, gold medalist(s)		Henrietta Ónodi	Hungary
1st place, gold medalist(s)		Lavinia Miloșovici	Romania
3rd place, bronze medalist(s)		Tatiana Lysenko	Unified Team

These are the results of the women's vault competition, one of six events for female competitors in artistic gymnastics at the 1992 Summer Olympics in Barcelona. The qualification and final rounds took place on July 28 and August 1, 1992, at the Palau Sant Jordi.

== Results ==
=== Qualification ===
Eighty-nine gymnasts competed in the vault event during the compulsory and optional rounds on July 26 and 28. The eight highest scoring gymnasts advanced to the final on August 1. Each country was limited to two competitors in the final.

Rank	Gymnast	Score
1	Shannon Miller (USA)	19.875
2	Henrietta Ónodi (HUN)	19.862
3	Kim Zmeskal (USA)	19.850
4	Lavinia Miloșovici (ROM)	19.837
5	Tatiana Lysenko (EUN)	19.824
7	Gina Gogean (ROM)	19.812
8	Svetlana Boginskaya (EUN)	19.800
12	Eva Rueda (ESP)	19.774

=== Final ===
Rank	Gymnast	Score
Gold medal	Henrietta Ónodi (HUN)	9.925
Gold medal	Lavinia Miloșovici (ROM)	9.925
Bronze medal	Tatiana Lysenko (EUN)	9.912
4	Svetlana Boginskaya (EUN)	9.899
5	Gina Gogean (ROM)	9.893
6	Shannon Miller (USA)	9.837
7	Eva Rueda (ESP)	9.787
8	Kim Zmeskal (USA)	9.593
