= Marie Hoesly =

American gymnast

Marie Margaret Hoesly (November 5, 1916 – September 30, 2003) was an American artistic gymnast. She competed at the 1952 Summer Olympics when she was 35, making her the oldest female gymnast from the United States to compete at the Olympics as of the 2024 Olympics. Although it was officially recognized as rhythmic gymnastics, one of the seven female gymnastics events was the team portable apparatus event which resembles modern rhythmic gymnastics.
