= 1990 FIG Artistic Gymnastics World Cup =

International gymnastics competition

The 1990 Artistic Gymnastics World Cup Final was held in Brussels, Belgium in 1990.

== Medal winners ==
Event	Gold	Silver	Bronze	Ref.
Men
All-around	(Soviet Union) Valeri Belenki	(Soviet Union) Vitaly Scherbo	(China) Li Jing	
Floor exercise	(Soviet Union) Vitaly Scherbo	(Soviet Union) Valeri Belenki	(Italy) Juri Chechi	
Pommel horse	(China) Li Jing	(Soviet Union) Valeri Belenki	(West Germany) Andreas Wecker	
Rings	(Soviet Union) Valeri Belenki	(China) Li Jing	(Soviet Union) Vitaly Scherbo	
Vault	(Soviet Union) Vitaly Scherbo	(Japan) Daisuke Nishikawa	(Soviet Union) Valeri Belenki (China) Li Jing	
Parallel bars	(Soviet Union) Valeri Belenki	(Japan) Daisuke Nishikawa (China) Li Jing	None awarded	
Horizontal bar	(Soviet Union) Valeri Belenki (Japan) Daisuke Nishikawa (China) Li Jing	None awarded	None awarded	
Women
All-around	Tatiana Lysenko (URS)	Svetlana Boginskaya (URS)	Henrietta Ónodi (HUN)	
Vault	Henrietta Ónodi (HUN)	Eva Rueda (ESP)	Svetlana Boginskaya (URS)	
Uneven bars	Tatiana Lysenko (URS)	Mirela Pasca (ROU)	Henrietta Ónodi (HUN)	
Balance beam	Yang Bo (CHN)	Li Li (CHN)	Cristina Bontas (ROU)	
Floor Exercise	Svetlana Boginskaya (URS)	Henrietta Ónodi (HUN)	Tatiana Lysenko (URS) Mirela Pasca (ROU)	

== Women's results ==
=== All-around ===
Rank	Gymnast	Vault (gymnastics)	Uneven bars	Balance beam	Floor (gymnastics)	Total
1st place, gold medalist(s)	Tatiana Lysenko (URS)	9.925	9.887	9.887	9.900	39.599
2nd place, silver medalist(s)	Svetlana Boginskaya (URS)	9.937	9.825	9.887	9.937	39.586
3rd place, bronze medalist(s)	Henrietta Ónodi (HUN)	9.937	9.875	9.862	9.900	39.574
4	Yang Bo (CHN)	9.887	9.862	9.987	9.787	39.523
5	Brandy Johnson (USA)	9.800	9.850	9.850	9.850	39.350
6	Cristina Bontas (ROU)	9.850	9.800	9.825	9.862	39.337
7	Mirela Pasca (ROU)	9.787	9.875	9.800	9.825	39.287
8	Alicia Fernández (ESP)	9.787	9.800	9.775	9.650	39.012
9	Eva Rueda (ESP)	9.912	9.775	9.350	9.787	38.824
10	Li Li (CHN)	9.712	9.625	9.837	9.612	38.786
11	Hanaka Miura (JPN)	9.775	9.737	9.225	9.737	38.474
12	Karine Mermet (FRA)	9.862	9.025	9.775	9.712	38.374
13	Maya Hristova (BUL)	9.812	9.825	9.812	8.912	38.361
14	Mari Kosuge (JPN)	9.712	9.712	9.787	8.950	38.161
15	Sandy Woolsey (USA)	9.800	9.787	8.725	9.712	38.024
16	Leah Homma (CAN)	9.737	9.062	9.675	9.250	37.724
17	Anke Schonfelder (GDR)	9.687	8.950	9.650	9.350	37.662
18	Stephanie Moreau (BEL)	9.450	9.512	9.350	8.650	36.962
19	Stephanie Lamboray (BEL)	9.700	9.262	9.075	8.875	36.912

=== Vault Final ===
Rank	Gymnast	Total
1st place, gold medalist(s)	Henrietta Ónodi (HUN)	9.937
2nd place, silver medalist(s)	Eva Rueda (ESP)	9.918
3rd place, bronze medalist(s)	Svetlana Boginskaya (URS)	9.912
4	Tatiana Lysenko (URS)	9.887
5	Yang Bo (CHN)	9.868
5	Karine Mermet (FRA)	9.868
7	Cristina Bontas (ROU)	9.831
8	Maya Hristova (BUL)	9.687

=== Uneven Bars ===
Rank	Gymnast	Total
1st place, gold medalist(s)	Tatiana Lysenko (URS)	9.937
2nd place, silver medalist(s)	Mirela Pasca (ROU)	9.912
3rd place, bronze medalist(s)	Henrietta Ónodi (HUN)	9.900
4	Svetlana Boginskaya (URS)	9.887
4	Yang Bo (CHN)	9.887
6	Brandy Johnson (USA)	9.862
7	Cristina Bontas (ROU)	9.850
8	Maya Hristova (BUL)	9.737

=== Balance Beam ===
Rank	Gymnast	Total
1st place, gold medalist(s)	Yang Bo (CHN)	9.950
2nd place, silver medalist(s)	Li Li (CHN)	9.925
3rd place, bronze medalist(s)	Cristina Bontas (ROU)	9.912
4	Tatiana Lysenko (URS)	9.887
4	Svetlana Boginskaya (URS)	9.887
4	Maya Hristova (BUL)	9.887
7	Brandy Johnson (USA)	9.862
8	Henrietta Ónodi (HUN)	9.362

=== Floor Exercise ===
Rank	Gymnast	Total
1st place, gold medalist(s)	Svetlana Boginskaya (URS)	9.962
2nd place, silver medalist(s)	Henrietta Ónodi (HUN)	9.937
3rd place, bronze medalist(s)	Tatiana Lysenko (URS)	9.887
3rd place, bronze medalist(s)	Mirela Pasca (ROU)	9.887
4	Eva Rueda (ESP)	9.875
6	Yang Bo (CHN)	9.837
7	Cristina Bontas (ROU)	9.725
8	Brandy Johnson (USA)	9.375
