= Ute Starke =

East German gymnast

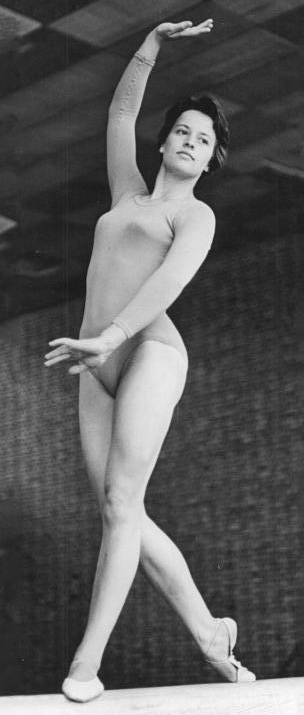
- Ute Starke in 1964

Personal information
- Born: 14 January 1939 (age 87) Eisleben, Germany
- Height: 1.71 m (5 ft 7 in)
- Weight: 49 kg (108 lb)

Sport
- Sport: Artistic gymnastics
- Club: SC Leipzig
Medal record
Representing East Germany
Olympic Games
Bronze medal – third place	1968 Mexico City	Team
European Championships
Gold medal – first place	1961 Leipzig	Vault
Silver medal – second place	1965 Sofia	Vault

Ute Starke (born 14 January 1939) is a German former gymnast. She competed at the 1960, 1964 and 1968 Summer Olympics in all artistic gymnastics events and finished in sixth, fourth and third place with the German and later East German teams. Individually her best achievement was sixth place on the vault in 1964. She won a gold and a silver medal in this event at the European championships of 1961 and 1965.

She was elected 1961 East German Sportswoman of the Year after winning the European Championship on the vault. She was one of the first gymnasts from the former GDR who reached world class status. Between 1961 and 1965 Starke won seven East German individual titles. She is now considered responsible for the rise of world class women's gymnastics in East Germany, and later became a longtime gymnast coach at her home club SC Leipzig.

== See also ==
- List of female artistic gymnasts with the most appearances at Olympic Games
