= István Sárkány =

Hungarian artistic gymnast (1913–2009)

- Born: 5 August 1913 Turda, Austria-Hungary
- Died: 27 November 2009 (aged 96) Budapest, Hungary
- Spouse: Ágnes Keleti

Gymnastics career
- Discipline: Men's artistic gymnastics
- Country represented: Hungary
- Club: Vívó és Atlétikai Club

István Sárkány (Hungarian pronunciation: [ˈʃaːrkaːɲ ˈiʃtvaːn]; 5 August 1913 – 27 November 2009) was a Hungarian Olympics gymnast, judge, and gymnastics coach. He represented Hungary at the 1936 Berlin Summer Olympics at the age of 22. Sárkány participated in all men's gymnastic events with highs of 29th in the Rings and 31st in the Vault competitions. He placed 64th in the Men's All-around competition.

== Career ==
Sárkány's personal gymnastics career was impacted by the World War II as the 1940 and 1944 Olympic Games were canceled due to said war. He was praised for his highly regarded career as a Hungarian and world gymnastics judge. Sárkány was noted in the official Olympic Game reports as judging the 1952 Horizontal Bar competitions, 1956 (no specific apparatus), 1960 Long Horse competitions, and 1964 Horizontal Bars competitions. Although Olympic reports no longer listed individual judges afterwards, Sárkány was also believed to have judged the 1968 and 1972 Summer Olympic Games, respectively in Mexico City and Munich.

Sárkány was honored in Hungarian gymnastics and sports hall of fames for his years of service. He was also featured in Hungarian sport documentaries, most notably on the 1956 Summer Olympic Games. That Olympic Games were noted for the famous "Blood in the Water match" in water polo between Hungary and Russia as well as numerous Hungarian Olympic athletes that sought asylum rather than return to Hungary under Russian rule. Some athletes stayed in Australia. Others were welcomed in the United States and toured the country under a Sports Illustrated-sponsored tour. Sárkány returned to Hungary to continue his storied judging and officiating career. Sárkány's obituary highlighted his contributions to Hungarian and Olympic gymnastics.

Sárkány died on 27 November 2009.
