= Josy Stoffel =

Luxembourgish gymnast (1928–2021)

Joseph Stoffel
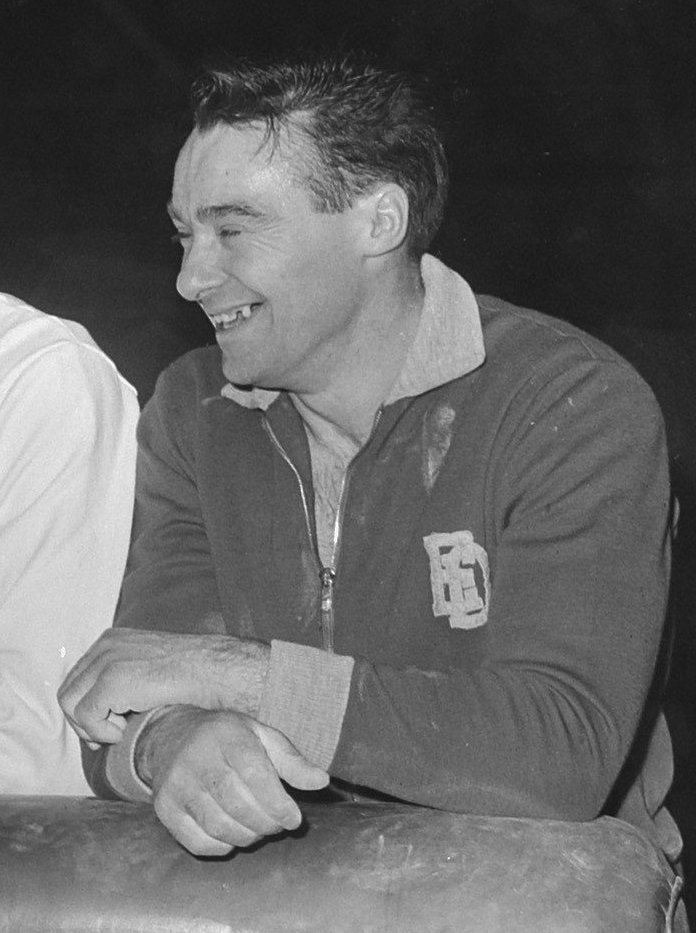
- Born: 27 June 1928 Differdange
- Died: 9 March 2021 (aged 92)

Gymnastics career
- Discipline: Men's artistic gymnastics
- Country represented: Luxembourg
Medal record
Representing Luxembourg
European Championships
Bronze medal – third place	1955 Frankfurt	Vault

Josy Stoffel (27 June 1928 – 9 March 2021) was a Luxembourgish gymnast. He was born in Differdange. He participated in five consecutive editions of the Summer Olympic Games (1948, 1952, 1956, 1960, 1964), but never won a medal. Nonetheless, Stoffel dominated the domestic scene, and won Luxembourg's national gymnastics championships for sixteen straight years, from 1949 until 1964. In 2008 he was promoted to the rank of Chevalier in the Order of Merit of the Grand Duchy of Luxembourg.
