= Yang Bo (gymnast) =

Chinese gymnast (born 1973)

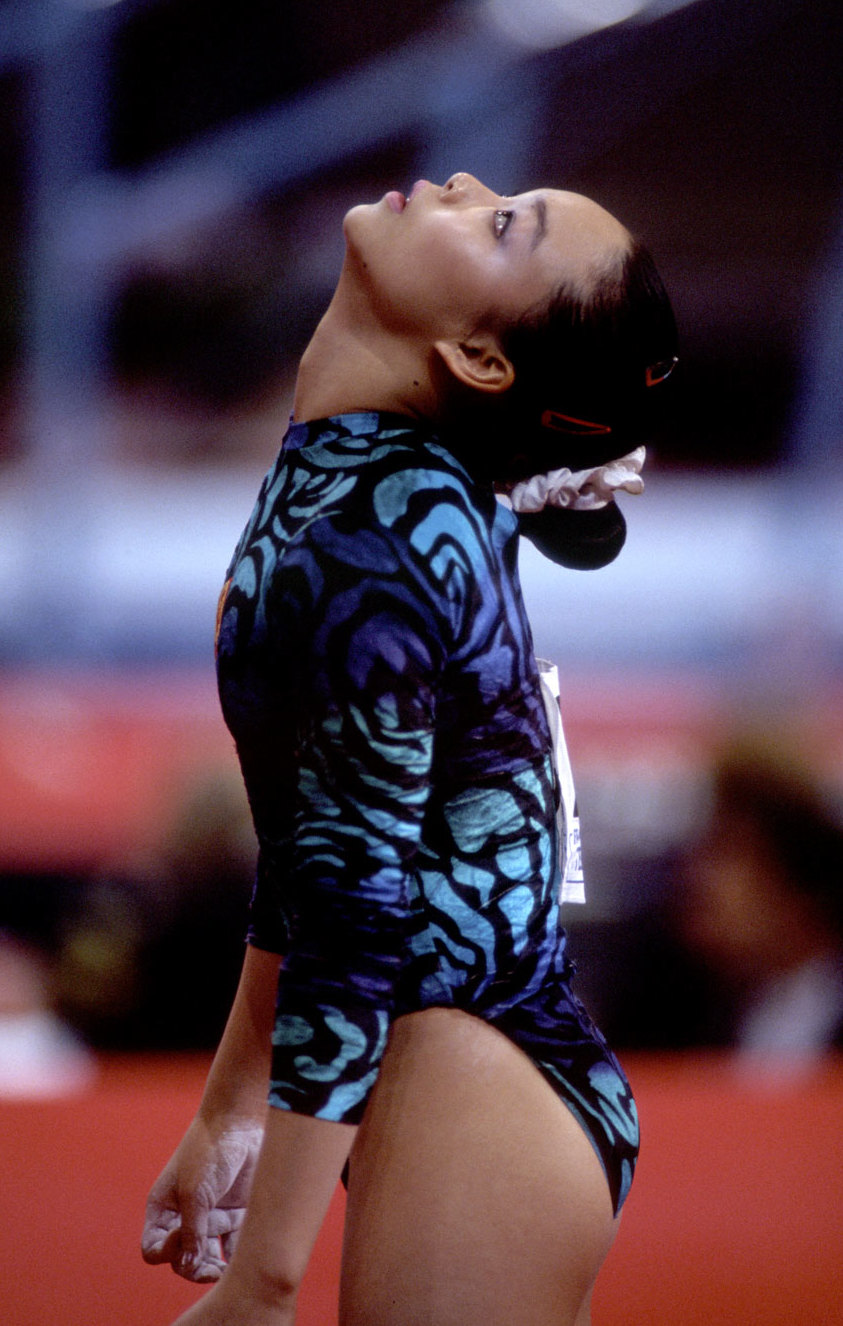
- Yang Bo at the World Championships in Paris-Bercy, 1992

Personal information
- Full name: Yang Bo
- Born: July 8, 1973 (age 53) Ningbo, Zhejiang

Gymnastics career
- Discipline: Women's artistic gymnastics
- Country represented: China
- Eponymous skills: "Yang Bo" (balance beam)
- Retired: 1993
Medal record
Representing China
World Championships
Bronze medal – third place	1989 Stuttgart	Team
World Cup Final
Gold medal – first place	1990 Brussels	Balance Beam
Asian Games
Gold medal – first place	1990 Beijing	Team
Gold medal – first place	1990 Beijing	Floor Exercise
Bronze medal – third place	1990 Beijing	Balance Beam

Yang Bo (simplified Chinese: 杨波; traditional Chinese: 楊波; pinyin: Yáng Bō; born July 8, 1973, in Ningbo, Zhejiang) is a Chinese gymnast. She is widely regarded as one of the greatest gymnasts ever on the balance beam, for which she created a move known as the "Yang Bo", which is rated as a D element in the Code of Points. Although widely renowned for her work on beam, Yang often had difficulty with consistency which prevented her from medalling at several major competitions. She competed at the 1992 Summer Olympics, placing 25th in the all-around and 7th on the beam. She won the 1990 World Cup Final on Balance Beam and won the bronze medal with her team at the 1989 World Championship.

At the 1989 World Championships in Stuttgart, Yang performed an innovative beam routine during the team and individual all-around competitions, where she placed 5th. In the event finals, she under-rotated her dismount and placed 7th with a score of 9.800.

In 1990, she competed at the Asian Games in Beijing, finishing 6th in the all-around, 3rd on beam, and won the team all-around gold. Later that year, she won the beam title at the World Cup Final in Brussels. At the 1991 World Championships, she placed 5th in the balance beam with a score of 9.887 after taking multiple steps on her dismount.

Yang was on the Chinese 1992 Summer Olympic team. The Chinese team placed 4th. Individually, she placed 13th in the all-around after a fall on bars. She also qualified in 6th place to the balance beam finals, where she fell during her layout series, though was able to stick the landing of her dismount. She placed 7th in that event with a score of 9.300. Her teammate, Lu Li and American gymnast Shannon Miller tied with a 9.912 to win a silver medal while Tatiana Lysenko won gold with a 9.975.

Yang retired from gymnastics in 1993 and pursued her university studies in journalism. She went on to enter show business and has been seen in TV shows with singing and acting performances in the 2000s.

== Eponymous skill ==
Yang has one eponymous skill listed in the Code of Points.

Apparatus	Name	Description	Difficulty (Note: Valid for the 2025–2028 Code of Points)
Balance beam	Yang Bo	From cross stand - jump to over split with body arched and head dropped backward	D (0.4)

== Competition history ==
Year	Event	TF	AA	VT	UB	BB	FX
1987	World Sports Fair		4				
1988	Catania Cup		2nd place, silver medalist(s)				
1988	Pacific Championships		1st place, gold medalist(s)				
1988	Moncada Cup		1st place, gold medalist(s)				
1989	Australian Grand Prix		2nd place, silver medalist(s)		1st place, gold medalist(s)	1st place, gold medalist(s)	
1989	Beijing International		1st place, gold medalist(s)				
1989	World Championships	3rd place, bronze medalist(s)	5		6	7	7
1989	Chunichi Cup		12				
1989	Tokyo Cup				2nd place, silver medalist(s)	1st place, gold medalist(s)	
1989	Konica Cup		3rd place, bronze medalist(s)				
1990	French International		3rd place, bronze medalist(s)		1st place, gold medalist(s)	1st place, gold medalist(s)	
1990	World Cup Final		4	5	4	1st place, gold medalist(s)	6
1990	China Cup		1st place, gold medalist(s)				
1990	Asian Games	1st place, gold medalist(s)	6			3rd place, bronze medalist(s)	
1991	Chinese Championships		2nd place, silver medalist(s)				
1991	World Championships	4				5	
1992	Massilia Gym Cup		32				
1992	Olympic Games	4	25			7	

== Sources ==
- Yang Bo at World Gymnastics
- Yang Bo at Olympics.com
- Yang Bo at Olympedia
- Animation of Yang Bo performing the move, named after her
- Video of a Yang Bo leap
