= List of male artistic gymnasts with the most appearances at Olympic Games =

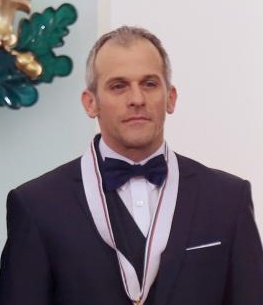
Yordan Yovchev has competed at 6 Olympic Games, the most of any male artistic gymnast

Men have competed in artistic gymnastics at the Olympic Games since its inauguration in 1896. While many male artistic gymnasts have competed in multiple Olympic Games, only four have competed in at least five separate Games: Yordan Yovchev (6), Marian Drăgulescu, Heikki Savolainen, and Josy Stoffel.

Gymnasts
Rank	Gymnast	Nation	Olympics	Total	Ref.
1	Yordan Yovchev	Bulgaria	1992, 1996, 2000, 2004, 2008, 2012	6	
2	Marian Drăgulescu	Romania	2000, 2004, 2008, 2016, 2020	5	
2	Heikki Savolainen	Finland	1928, 1932, 1936, 1948, 1952	5	
2	Josy Stoffel	Luxembourg	1948, 1952, 1956, 1960, 1964	5	
5	Alberto Busnari	Italy	2000, 2004, 2008, 2012	4	
5	Yann Cucherat	France	2000, 2004, 2008, 2012	4	
5	Artur Davtyan	Armenia	2012, 2016, 2020, 2024	4	
5	Ilia Giorgadze	Georgia	1996, 2000, 2004, 2008	4	
5	Fabian Hambüchen	Germany	2004, 2008, 2012, 2016	4	
5	Al Jochim	United States	1924, 1928, 1932, 1936	4	
5	Vlasios Maras	Greece	2004, 2008, 2012, 2016	4	
5	Michel Mathiot	France	1948, 1952, 1956, 1960	4	
5	Georges Miez	Switzerland	1924, 1928, 1932, 1936	4	
5	Takashi Ono	Japan	1952, 1956, 1960, 1964	4	
5	Igor Radivilov	Ukraine	2012, 2016, 2020, 2024	4	
5	Hans Sauter	Austria	1948, 1952, 1956, 1960	4	
5	Alexander Shatilov	Israel	2008, 2012, 2016, 2020	4	
5	Andreas Toba	Germany	2012, 2016, 2020, 2024	4	
5	Kōhei Uchimura	Japan	2008, 2012, 2016, 2020	4	
5	Max Whitlock	Great Britain	2012, 2016, 2020, 2024	4	
5	Epke Zonderland	Netherlands	2008, 2012, 2016, 2020	4	

== See also ==
- List of Olympic medal leaders in men's gymnastics
- List of female artistic gymnasts with the most appearances at Olympic Games
