= Andrea Molnár-Bodó =

Hungarian gymnast (1934–2022)

Andrea Bodó
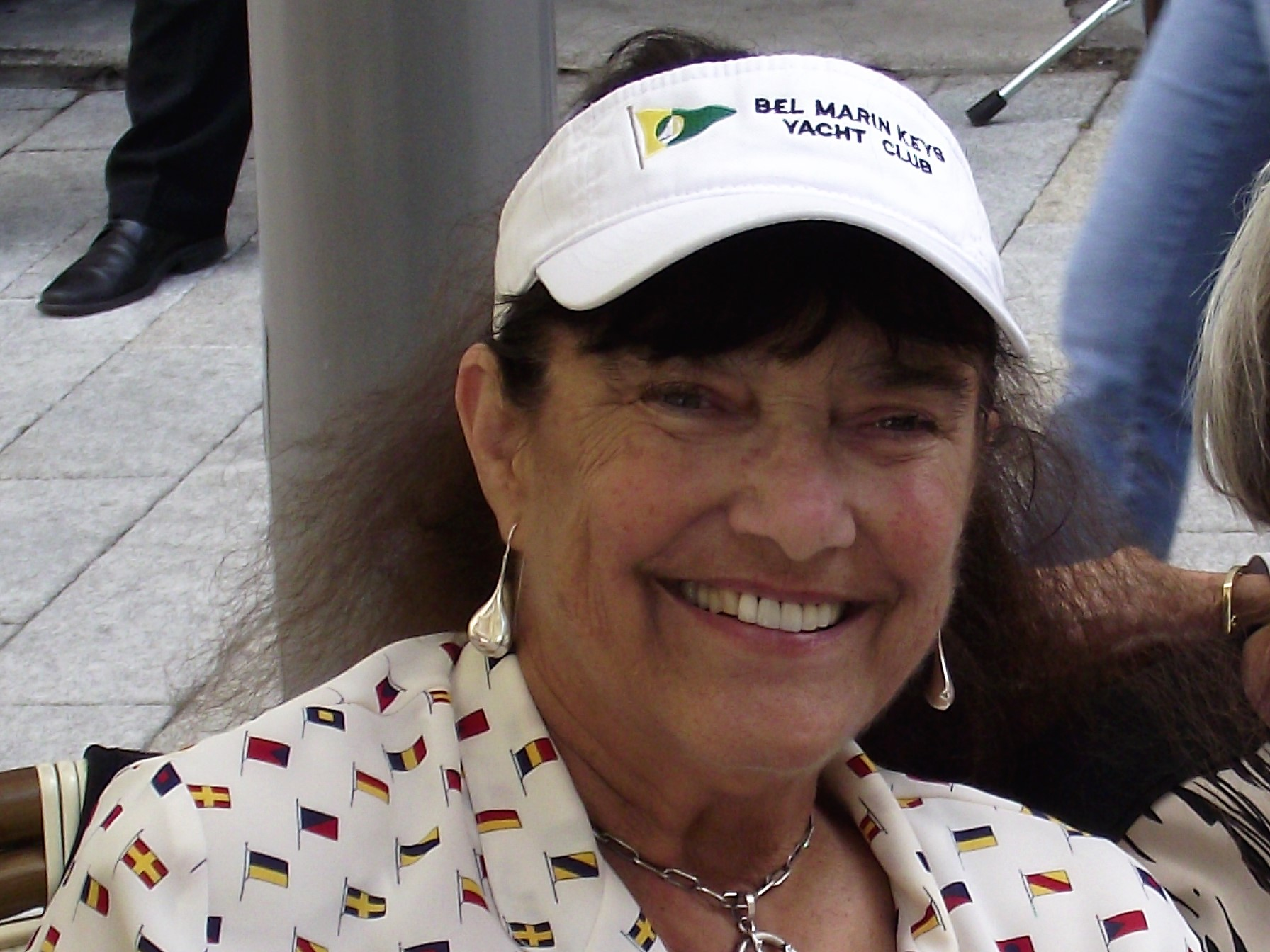
- Bodó in 2012

Medal record

Women's artistic gymnastics

Representing Hungary

Olympic Games
Gold medal – first place	1956 Melbourne	Team Portable Apparatus
Silver medal – second place	1952 Helsinki	Team
Silver medal – second place	1956 Melbourne	Team
Bronze medal – third place	1952 Helsinki	Team Portable Apparatus

Andrea Bodó, married Andrea Molnár-Bodó, Andrea Schmid-Bodó, and Andrea Schmid-Shapiro (4 August 1934 – 21 September 2022) was a Hungarian gymnast who competed in the 1952 Summer Olympics and in the 1956 Summer Olympics.

After 1956, the year of the Hungarian revolution suppressed by the army of the Soviet Union, she moved to the United States. She studied at the University of California. She became a rhythmic gymnastics coach, judge and administrator, serving as a member of the FIG RG technical committee for 17 years between 1984 and 2001. She also taught at the San Francisco State University.

Molnár-Bodó was first married to Miklos Molnar, sports journalist and fellow emigrant from Hungary, they had a daughter named Aniko. After splitting she married twice again, last time with physics professor Charles Shapiro.

Molnár-Bodó was also author of several books on gymnastics, like Introduction to Women's Gymnastics (1973, with Blanche Jessen Drury) and Modern rhythmic gymnastics (1976).

== See also ==
- List of Olympic female gymnasts for Hungary
