= Tatiana Lysenko =

Ukrainian gymnast

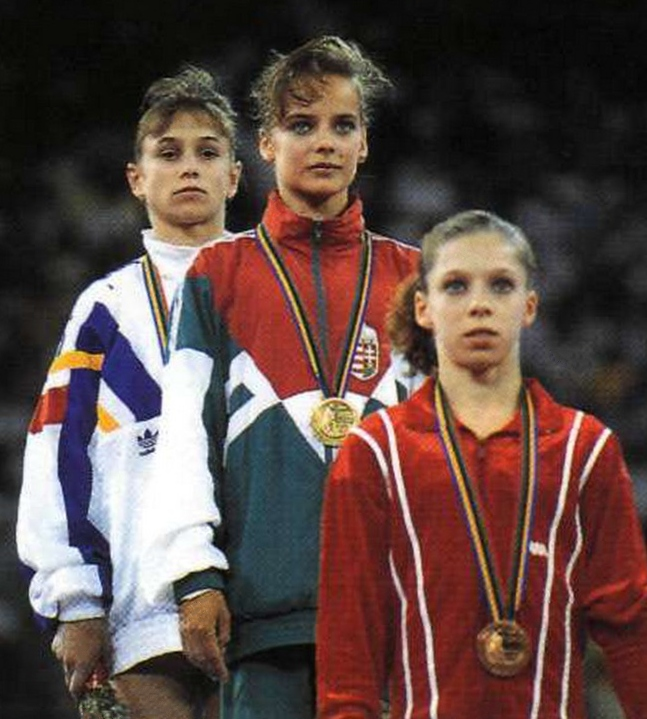
- Lysenko (right) at the 1992 Olympics

Personal information
- Full name: Tatiana Felixivna Lysenko
- Born: June 23, 1975 (age 51) Kherson, Ukrainian SSR, Soviet Union

Gymnastics career
- Discipline: Women's artistic gymnastics
- Country represented: Ukraine
- Former countries represented: CIS ( Unified Team); Soviet Union
- Club: Dynamo Kherson
- Head coach: Oleg Ostapenko
- Retired: 1994
Medal record
Representing CIS ( Unified Team)
Olympic Games
Gold medal – first place	1992 Barcelona	Team
Gold medal – first place	1992 Barcelona	Balance Beam
Bronze medal – third place	1992 Barcelona	Vault
World Championships
Bronze medal – third place	1992 Paris	Floor exercise
Representing Soviet Union
World Championships
Gold medal – first place	1991 Indianapolis	Team
World Cup Final
Gold medal – first place	1990 Brussels	All-around
Gold medal – first place	1990 Brussels	Uneven bars
Bronze medal – third place	1990 Brussels	Floor exercise
Goodwill Games
Gold medal – first place	1990 Seattle	Team
Representing Ukraine
World Championships
Bronze medal – third place	1993 Birmingham	All-around
European Championships
Silver medal – second place	1992 Nantes	Uneven bars
Summer Universiade
Gold medal – first place	1993 Buffalo	All-around
Gold medal – first place	1993 Buffalo	Team
Gold medal – first place	1993 Buffalo	Balance beam

Tatiana Felixivna Lysenko (Ukrainian: Тетяна Фелiксiвна Лисенко; born June 23, 1975) is a Soviet and Ukrainian former gymnast, who had her senior competitive career from 1990 to 1994. Lysenko was a member of the Soviet Union team during the early 1990s, a period when its pool of talent was deep (the USSR never lost the women's team competition in the Olympic Games). She is the 1992 Olympic champion on balance beam.

== Gymnastics career ==
Lysenko was born in Kherson, Ukrainian SSR, and has a Ukrainian-Jewish background. She took up gymnastics at the age of seven, and made her senior debut in 1990, winning the all-around competition at the World Cup. In 1990, Lysenko participated at the 1990 Goodwill Games in Seattle and won a gold medal in team competition

Next year she was selected for the world championships in Indianapolis, where she won the team competition. She qualified to the all-around competition, ahead of her talented teammates Oksana Chusovitina, Rozalia Galiyeva and Natalia Kalinina, but fell from beam and did not win any individual medal.

Lysenko's most notable achievements came at the 1992 Summer Olympics in Barcelona. She represented the Unified Team (ex-Soviets) along with Svetlana Boguinskaya, Tatiana Gutsu, Elena Grudneva, Rozalia Galiyeva and Oksana Chusovitina. They won the team title by a comfortable margin. Lysenko finished 7th all-around, but she won the bronze medal in the vault after performing the most difficult vault in the entire competition, a double-twisting Yurchenko (9.912). Lysenko then won the gold in the beam event (9.975).

Unlike many of her Soviet teammates, Lysenko opted to continue after the breakup of the USSR, and represented her native Ukraine at the 1993 World Championships in Birmingham. She won bronze in the all-around, which would have been gold had she not stepped out of the floor. Lysenko was one of only two ex-Soviets on the podium along with Oksana Chusovitina (representing Uzbekistan).

In 1993, Lysenko, representing Ukraine, competed at the 1993 Summer Universiade in Buffalo and won gold medals in all-around, team and balance beam.

Lysenko continued to compete internationally in 1994. She placed 18th in the all-around at the World Championships in Brisbane. In the event finals, she placed fourth on vault. She retired after the World Championships.

== Later life ==
After retiring from competitions Lysenko moved to the United States and now lives in Redwood City, California, where she is an attorney. She graduated from the University of San Francisco School of Law and was admitted the California State Bar in 2005. In 2002, she was inducted into the International Jewish Sports Hall of Fame, and in 2016 into the International Gymnastics Hall of Fame. She is married and has a daughter.

== Competitive history ==
Year	Event	Team	AA	VT	UB	BB	FX
1989	International Junior Championships		2nd place, silver medalist(s)	1st place, gold medalist(s)	4	1st place, gold medalist(s)	2nd place, silver medalist(s)
1989	Druzhba		3rd place, bronze medalist(s)				1st place, gold medalist(s)
1989	Junior URS-GDR Dual Meet	1st place, gold medalist(s)	1st place, gold medalist(s)				
1990	Chunichi Cup		2nd place, silver medalist(s)	3rd place, bronze medalist(s)	1st place, gold medalist(s)	3rd place, bronze medalist(s)	2nd place, silver medalist(s)
1990	Tokyo Cup				1st place, gold medalist(s)		
1990	Goodwill Games	1st place, gold medalist(s)					
1990	URS-USA Dual Meet	1st place, gold medalist(s)	5				
1990	Blume Memorial		9				
1990	USSR Championships		4				
1990	USSR Cup		8	3rd place, bronze medalist(s)			
1990	World Cup		1st place, gold medalist(s)	4	1st place, gold medalist(s)	4	3rd place, bronze medalist(s)
1991	Blume Memorial		3rd place, bronze medalist(s)				
1991	USSR Spartakiade		2nd place, silver medalist(s)				
1991	URS-ITA Dual Meet	1st place, gold medalist(s)	5				
1991	World Championships	1st place, gold medalist(s)	13		8		
1992	World Stars		2nd place, silver medalist(s)		4	7	3rd place, bronze medalist(s)
1992	DTB Cup		2nd place, silver medalist(s)	2nd place, silver medalist(s)		1st place, gold medalist(s)	1st place, gold medalist(s)
1992	CIS Championships		1st place, gold medalist(s)				
1992	CIS Cup		4			2nd place, silver medalist(s)	
1992	World Championships				9	7	3rd place, bronze medalist(s)
1992	European Championships		4	6	2nd place, silver medalist(s)		4
1992	Gander Memorial		2nd place, silver medalist(s)				
1992	Olympic Games	1st place, gold medalist(s)	7	3rd place, bronze medalist(s)		1st place, gold medalist(s)	
1993	Birmingham Classic		3rd place, bronze medalist(s)				
1993	UKR-USA-BLR Tri-Meet		3rd place, bronze medalist(s)				
1993	French International					2nd place, silver medalist(s)	
1993	Soapberry World Challenge		3rd place, bronze medalist(s)				
1993	Gander Memorial		3rd place, bronze medalist(s)				
1993	University Games	1st place, gold medalist(s)	1st place, gold medalist(s)	7		1st place, gold medalist(s)	6
1993	DTB Cup			3rd place, bronze medalist(s)	6	4	
1993	World Championships		3rd place, bronze medalist(s)		5		
1994
1994	World Championships		18	4			

== See also ==
- List of select Jewish gymnasts
