= Margit Korondi =

Hungarian gymnast (1932–2022)

- Born: 24 June 1932 Celje, Yugoslavia
- Died: 6 March 2022 (aged 89) Los Angeles, California, U.S.

Gymnastics career
- Discipline: Women's artistic gymnastics
- Country represented: Hungary (HUN)
Medal record
Olympic Games
Gold medal – first place	1952 Helsinki	Uneven Bars
Gold medal – first place	1956 Melbourne	Team Apparatus
Silver medal – second place	1952 Helsinki	Team Exercises
Silver medal – second place	1956 Melbourne	Team Combined
Bronze medal – third place	1952 Helsinki	All-Around
Bronze medal – third place	1952 Helsinki	Balance Beam
Bronze medal – third place	1952 Helsinki	Floor Exercises
Bronze medal – third place	1952 Helsinki	Team Apparatus

Margit Korondi (24 June 1932 – 6 March 2022) was a Hungarian gymnast. She competed at the 1952 Summer Olympics in Helsinki, where she received a gold medal in uneven bars, a silver medal in team all-around, and four bronze medals. At the 1956 Summer Olympics in Melbourne, she received a gold medal in team portable apparatus and a silver medal in team all-around.

== See also ==
- List of multiple Summer Olympic medalists
- List of multiple Olympic medalists at a single Games
- List of top Olympic gymnastics medalists
- List of Olympic female gymnasts for Hungary

Records
Preceded by	Most career Olympic medals by a woman 1952 – 1956	Succeeded by (Hungary) Ágnes Keleti
