= Ágnes Keleti =

Hungarian-Israeli artistic gymnast (1921–2025)

- אגנס קלטי
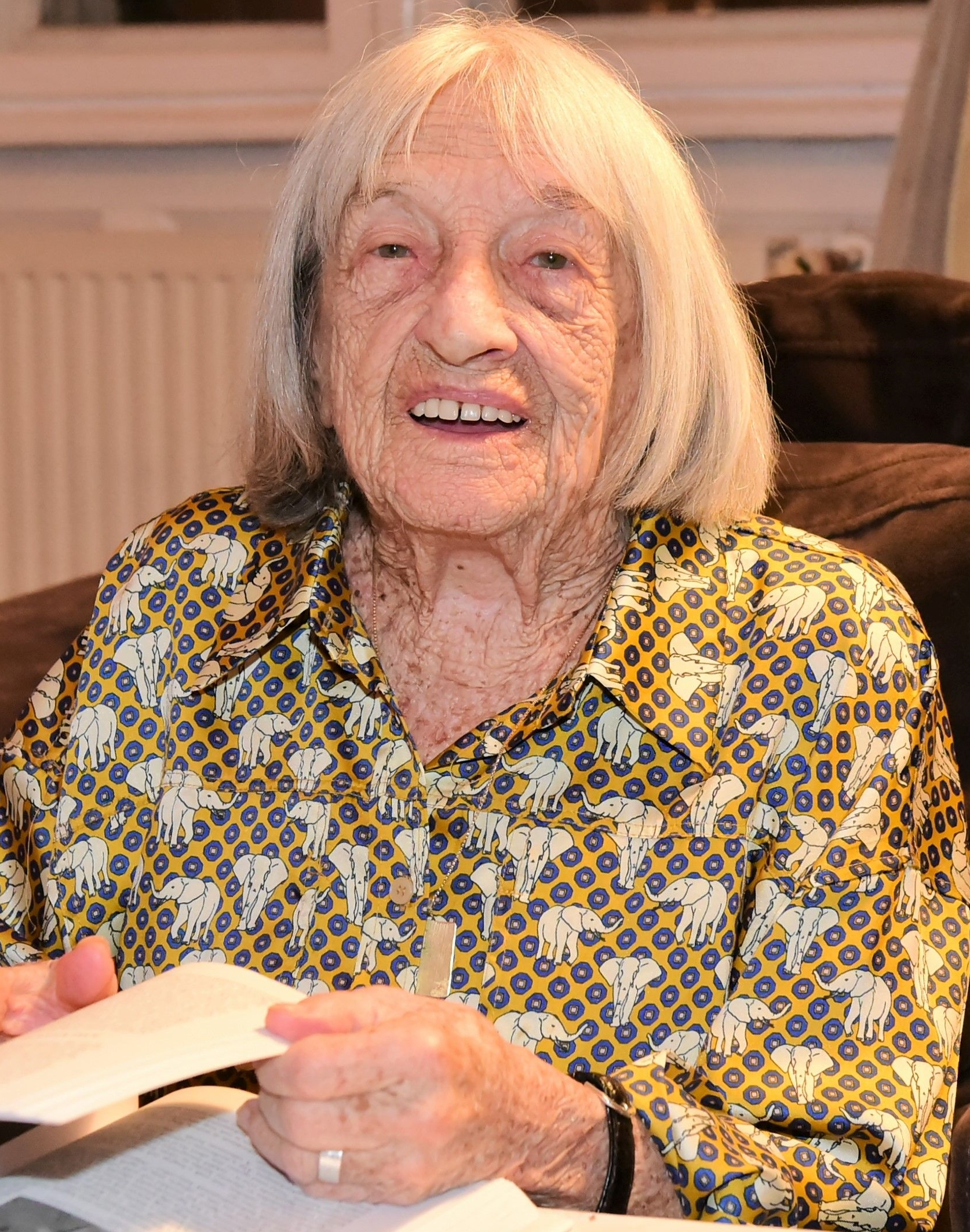
- Keleti in 2021

Personal information
- Alternative name: Ágnes Klein
- Nickname: Aggi
- Born: 9 January 1921 Budapest, Hungary
- Died: 2 January 2025 (aged 103) Budapest, Hungary
- Spouse: István Sárkány (m. 1944; div. 1950) Róbert Bíró (m. 1959)

Gymnastics career
- Discipline: Women's artistic gymnastics
- Country represented: Hungary (1937–1940, 1946–1958)
- Club: Nemzeti TE; Bp. Postás; TF Haladás; Újpesti TE
- Retired: 1958
Medal record
Women's gymnastics
Olympic Games
Gold medal – first place	1952 Helsinki	Floor exercise
Gold medal – first place	1956 Melbourne	Uneven bars
Gold medal – first place	1956 Melbourne	Balance beam
Gold medal – first place	1956 Melbourne	Floor exercise
Gold medal – first place	1956 Melbourne	Team, portable
Silver medal – second place	1952 Helsinki	Team
Silver medal – second place	1956 Melbourne	All-around
Silver medal – second place	1956 Melbourne	Team
Bronze medal – third place	1952 Helsinki	Uneven bars
Bronze medal – third place	1952 Helsinki	Team, portable
World Championships
Gold medal – first place	1954 Rome	Uneven bars
Silver medal – second place	1954 Rome	Team
Bronze medal – third place	1954 Rome	Balance beam

Ágnes Keleti (née Klein; Hebrew: אגנס קלט; 9 January 1921 – 2 January 2025) was a Hungarian and Israeli artistic gymnast and coach, who won multiple Olympic medals. She was the oldest living Olympic champion and medallist, reaching her 100th birthday on 9 January 2021. While representing Hungary at the Summer Olympics, she won 10 Olympic medals including five gold medals, three silver medals, and two bronze medals, and is considered to be one of the most successful Jewish Olympic athletes of all time. Keleti earned more Olympic medals than any other individual with Israeli citizenship, and more Olympic medals than any other Jew, except Mark Spitz. She was the most successful athlete at the 1956 Summer Olympics.

In 1957, Keleti immigrated to Israel, where she worked as a coach, eventually returning to her native Hungary in 2015 at the age of 94. In 2017, she was awarded the Israel Prize in sports.

== Biography ==
Agnes Klein (later Keleti) was born in Budapest, Hungary. She began to train in gymnastics at the age of 4, and by 16 was the Hungarian National Champion in gymnastics. Over the course of her career, between 1937 and 1956, she won the Championships title ten times. She changed her surname to Keleti to make it more Hungarian-sounding.

Keleti was considered a top prospect for the Hungarian team at the 1940 Olympics, but the escalation of World War II cancelled both the 1940 and the 1944 Games. She was expelled from her gymnastics club in 1941 for being a Jew. Because she had heard a rumour married women were not taken to labour camps, she hastily married István Sárkány in 1944. Sárkány was a Hungarian gymnast of the 1930s who achieved national titles and took part in the 1936 Berlin Olympics. Keleti survived the war by purchasing and using an identity paper of a Christian girl and working as a maid in a small village in the Hungarian countryside. Her mother and sister went into hiding and were saved using Swiss protection papers issued by diplomat Carl Lutz and possibly also by Swedish diplomat Raoul Wallenberg. Her father and other relatives were murdered by the Nazis by gassing in the Auschwitz concentration camp. In the winter of 1944–45, during the Siege of Budapest by Soviet forces near the end of World War II, Keleti would collect bodies of those who had died and place them in a mass grave each morning.

After the war, Keleti played the cello professionally and resumed training. In 1946, she won her first Hungarian championship. In 1947, she won the Central European gymnastics title. She qualified for the 1948 Summer Olympics, but missed the competition due to tearing a ligament in her ankle. She is listed on the Official List of Gymnastic Participants as Ágnes Sárkány. At the World University Games of 1949 she won four gold, one silver, and one bronze medal. She divorced her husband István Sárkány in 1950.

Keleti continued training and competed at the Olympics for the first time at the age of 31 at the 1952 Games in Helsinki. She earned four medals: gold in the floor exercise, silver in the team competition, and bronze in the team portable apparatus event and the uneven bars. Keleti continued on to the 1954 World Championships, where she won on the uneven bars, becoming world champion. At the 1956 Summer Olympics in Melbourne, Keleti won six medals including gold medals in three of the four individual event finals: floor, bars, and balance beam, and placed second in the all-around. She was the most successful athlete at these games. The Hungarian team placed first in the portable apparatus event and second in the team competition. At the age of 35, Keleti became the oldest female gymnast ever to win gold. The Soviet Union invaded Hungary during the 1956 Olympics. Keleti, along with 44 other athletes from the Hungarian delegation, decided to remain in Australia and received political asylum. She became a coach for Australian gymnasts.

Keleti immigrated to Israel in 1957, competing in the 1957 Maccabiah Games, and she was able to send for her mother and sister. In 1959, she married Hungarian physical education teacher Robert Biro whom she met in Israel, and they had two sons, Daniel and Rafael. Following her retirement from competition, Keleti worked as a physical education instructor at Tel Aviv University, and for 34 years at the Wingate Institute for Sports in Netanya.

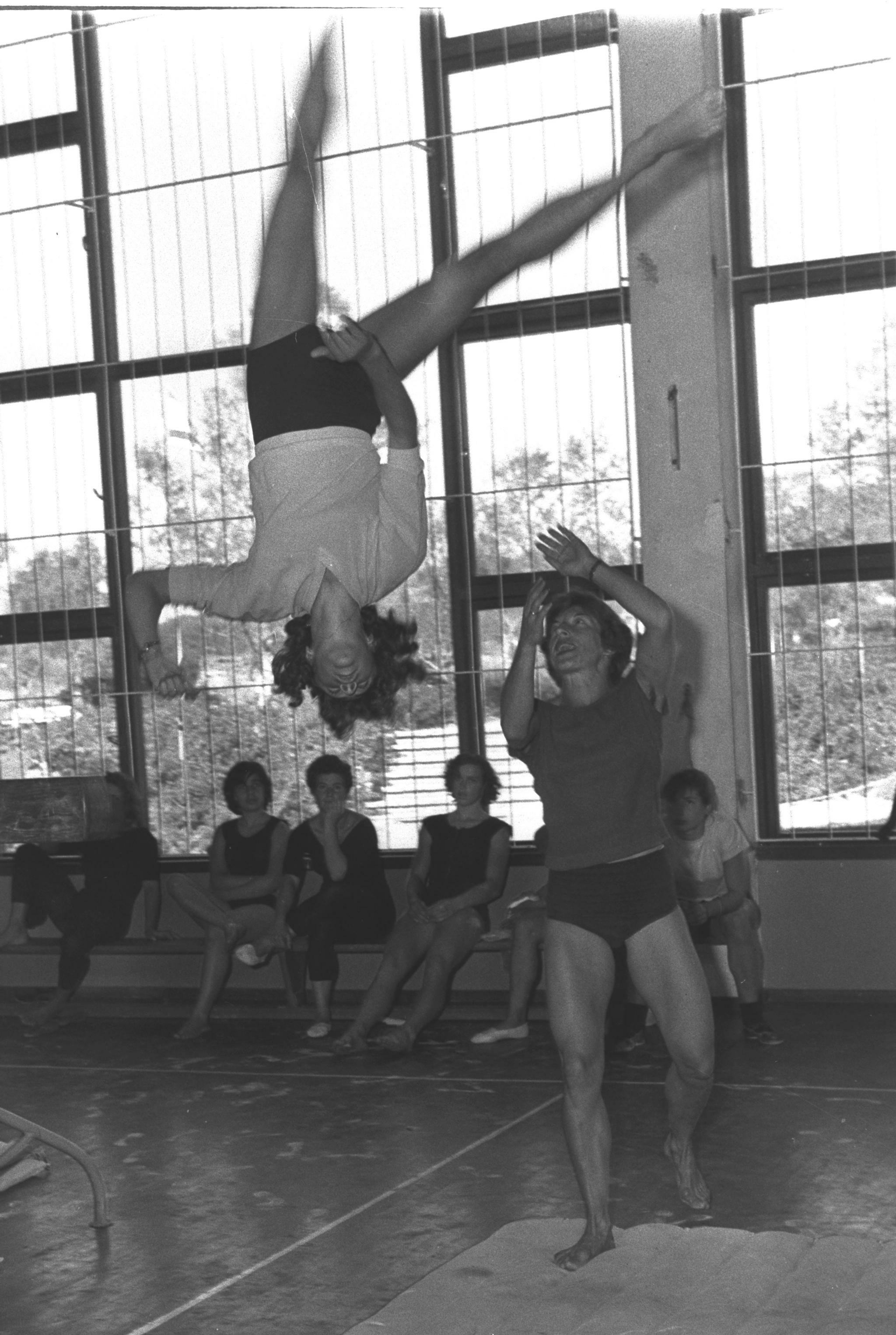
Ágnes Keleti training a student at the Wingate Institute in Israel on 12 May 1960

Keleti also coached and worked with Israel's national gymnastics team well into the 1990s. From 1990 onward, she gradually spent more time in her homeland of Hungary, ultimately settling in her native Budapest in 2015.

Keleti became the oldest Hungarian Olympic champion when Sándor Tarics died on 21 May 2016. She became the oldest living Olympic champion when Lydia Wideman died on 13 April 2019. She celebrated her 100th birthday in January 2021. She became the longest-lived Olympic champion ever on 7 August 2023, breaking the record previously held by Tarics.

Keleti died in Budapest on 2 January 2025, a week before her 104th birthday, after being hospitalised with pneumonia in the previous week.

== Awards and honours ==
- Keleti was inducted into the International Jewish Sports Hall of Fame in 1981, the Hungarian Sports Hall of Fame in 1991, the International Women's Sports Hall of Fame in 2001, and the International Gymnastics Hall of Fame in 2002.
- In 1982, she was awarded the Herzl Prize for sports.
- Keleti was named in Hungary's 12 "Athletes of the Nation" in 2004
- Asteroid 265594 Keletiágnes, discovered by Krisztián Sárneczky in 2005, was named in her honour. The official naming citation was published by the Minor Planet Center on 12 July 2014 (M.P.C. 89086).
- In 2017, she was announced laureate of the Israel Prize in the field of sports.

== Competitive results ==
Year	Event	Team	TPA	AA	VT	UB	BB	FX
1952	Helsinki Summer Olympics	2nd place, silver medalist(s)	3rd place, bronze medalist(s)	6	41	3rd place, bronze medalist(s)	4	1st place, gold medalist(s)
1954	Rome World Championships	2nd place, silver medalist(s)	—N/a			1st place, gold medalist(s)	3rd place, bronze medalist(s)	4
1956	Melbourne Summer Olympics	2nd place, silver medalist(s)	1st place, gold medalist(s)	2nd place, silver medalist(s)	23	1st place, gold medalist(s)	1st place, gold medalist(s)	1st place, gold medalist(s)

== See also ==
- List of Soviet and Eastern Bloc defectors
- List of Jews in sports
- List of multiple Olympic gold medalists
- List of multiple Olympic gold medalists at a single Games
- List of Olympic female artistic gymnasts for Hungary
- List of Olympic medal leaders in women's gymnastics
- List of multiple Summer Olympic medalists

Records
Preceded by (Hungary) Margit Korondi	Most career Olympic medals by a woman 1956–1964	Succeeded by (Soviet Union) Larisa Latynina
