= Henrietta Ónodi =

Hungarian gymnast (born 1974)

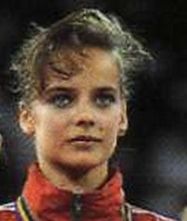
- Ónodi at the 1992 Olympics

Personal information
- Born: May 22, 1974 (age 52) Békéscsaba, Hungary
- Height: 146 cm (4 ft 9 in)
- Spouse: James Haley (m. 1993)

Gymnastics career
- Discipline: Women's artistic gymnastics
- Country represented: Hungary (1986–92, 1995–97 (HUN))
- Club: Békéscsabai Előre Atlétikai Club; ATorna Club Békéscsaba
- Head coach: Mihály Unyatyinszky
- Assistant coach: Júlia Karakas
- Retired: 1997
Medal record
Representing Hungary
Olympic Games
Gold medal – first place	1992 Barcelona	Vault
Silver medal – second place	1992 Barcelona	Floor exercise
World Championships
Gold medal – first place	1992 Paris	Vault
Silver medal – second place	1991 Indianapolis	Vault
Silver medal – second place	1992 Paris	Floor exercise
World Cup Final
Gold medal – first place	1990 Brussels	Vault
Silver medal – second place	1990 Brussels	Floor exercise
Bronze medal – third place	1990 Brussels	All-around
Bronze medal – third place	1990 Brussels	Uneven bars
Goodwill Games
Bronze medal – third place	1990 Seattle	All Around
European Championships
Gold medal – first place	1989 Brussels	Uneven bars
Bronze medal – third place	1989 Brussels	Floor exercise
Bronze medal – third place	1990 Athens	All-around
Bronze medal – third place	1990 Athens	Floor exercise

Henrietta Ónodi (born May 22, 1974) is a Hungarian artistic gymnast. She competed at the 1992 and 1996 Olympics and won a gold and a silver medal in 1992. After retiring from gymnastics in 1997 she moved to the United States, married American Olympic pentathlete James Haley, and became a naturalized U.S. citizen; they have three children together. In 2010, she was inducted into the International Gymnastics Hall of Fame.

== Early life ==
Ónodi was born in Békéscsaba and continued training there through her career.

== Career ==
Ónodi began gymnastics in 1978 and made her international debut in 1986. At the 1986 European Junior Championships, she placed 12th in the all-around and finished 4th in the balance beam final. Two years later, she finished 8th at the 1988 European Junior Championships and won silver on the uneven bars. Too young to qualify for the 1988 Olympics, she made her senior debut in 1989 and represented Hungary at the World Championships that year, where she placed 19th in the all-around and 5th in the balance beam event finals. Six weeks later, at the DTB cup, she won the all-around ahead of the 1989 World silver medalist, Natalia Lashchenova, and won three more medals in the apparatus final.

Over the next few years, Ónodi established herself as a medal contender at major events. In 1989, she became the first female Hungarian gymnast to medal at the European Championships with a gold on the uneven bars; at the 1990 Europeans, she placed third in the all-around and the floor exercise. In 1990, she also finished third in the all-around at the Goodwill Games and the World Cup where she won the vault event. At the 1991 World Championships Ónodi suffered a sudden back injury, but was able to win a silver medal on vault and helped the Hungarian squad qualify for the 1992 Olympics with an eighth-place finish in the team final.

The next year at the Olympics in Barcelona, Ónodi became the first female Hungarian gymnast in over 30 years to win an Olympic gold medal. She tied with Romanian Lavinia Miloșovici for the gold in the vault event final; on floor exercise, performing to "Hungarian Rhapsody" she finished second behind Miloşovici. Ónodi's difficulty level on vault was actually higher than Miloșovici's (they both used full twisting Yurchenkos but Henrietta did a piked barani and Milosovici a tucked). Ónodi also performed the difficult triple twist on floor, then an unusual move (nobody else in the Barcelona floor finals did it).

Ónodi semi-retired after Barcelona Olympics to focus on her studies. She returned to international competitions in 1995 at the World University Games and subsequently led the Hungarian team at the 1996 Olympics. She retired again in 1997 after attending her second University Games.

== Skills and style ==
Ónodi made many contributions to gymnastics during her competitive career. She was lauded for her unique style and power on vaulting and floor. Her uneven bars routine consisted of elements on the low bar at a time when most gymnasts did the minimum two elements on the low bar.

=== Eponymous skill ===
Onodi has one eponymous skill listed in the Code of Points.

Apparatus	Name	Description	Difficulty	Notes
Balance beam	Onodi	Jump bwd (flic-flac take-off) with ½ turn (180°) to walkover forward	D (0.4)	Though it is named after Ónodi, Olga Mostepanova was the first to compete the skill at a World Championships or Olympics. Henrietta also performed the skill on FX, but on FX it is rated as an A skill.

== Post-retirement ==
In 2001 Ónodi graduated with a degree in marketing and found a job in Miami, Florida, as Director of Community Relations for the World Olympians Association. She married Jimbo Haley, an American pentathlete who also competed at the 1992 Olympics, and became a naturalized U.S. citizen. In 2010, she was inducted into the International Gymnastics Hall of Fame.

In March 2024, at 50 years of age, Henrietta suffered a heart attack, the severity of which has necessitated long-term care. Her sister has set up a GoFund me.

== Competitive history ==
Year	Event	Team	AA	VT	UB	BB	FX
Junior
1985	FTC Cup				1st place, gold medalist(s)	1st place, gold medalist(s)	1st place, gold medalist(s)
1985	Pioneer Summer Olympics					3rd place, bronze medalist(s)	
1986	Avignon International		3rd place, bronze medalist(s)				
1986	Olso Tournament	1st place, gold medalist(s)	1st place, gold medalist(s)				
1986	BUL-HUN Dual Meet	2nd place, silver medalist(s)	4				
1986	European Championships		12			4	7
1986	Friendship Tournament	5	11		7		8
1986	Kosice International		17				
1986	Kraft International		3rd place, bronze medalist(s)	2nd place, silver medalist(s)	2nd place, silver medalist(s)		2nd place, silver medalist(s)
1986	Pioneer Summer Olympics		1st place, gold medalist(s)				
1987	McDonald's American Cup		7				
1987	Athens International		8	1st place, gold medalist(s)			
1987	International Mixed Pairs	15					
1987	Friendship Tournament	4	10		3rd place, bronze medalist(s)	6	7
1987	HUN-FRG Dual Meet	1st place, gold medalist(s)	1st place, gold medalist(s)				
1987	Kosice International		3rd place, bronze medalist(s)	2nd place, silver medalist(s)	6	2nd place, silver medalist(s)	3rd place, bronze medalist(s)
1988
1988	European Championships		8	6	2nd place, silver medalist(s)	4	
1988	Friendship Tournament	4	7	3rd place, bronze medalist(s)		6	6
1988	Hungarian Masters		1st place, gold medalist(s)	2nd place, silver medalist(s)	1st place, gold medalist(s)	1st place, gold medalist(s)	1st place, gold medalist(s)
1988	Mezobank Cup	1st place, gold medalist(s)					
Senior
1989	McDonald's American Cup		3rd place, bronze medalist(s)				
1989	DTB Cup		1st place, gold medalist(s)	2nd place, silver medalist(s)	2nd place, silver medalist(s)	4	1st place, gold medalist(s)
1989	European Championships		5	8	1st place, gold medalist(s)	5	3rd place, bronze medalist(s)
1989	Gander Memorial		2nd place, silver medalist(s)				
1989	GBR-HUN Dual Meet	1st place, gold medalist(s)	1st place, gold medalist(s)				
1989	Hungarian Championships		1st place, gold medalist(s)	1st place, gold medalist(s)	1st place, gold medalist(s)	1st place, gold medalist(s)	1st place, gold medalist(s)
1989	Hungarian High School Championships		2nd place, silver medalist(s)		1st place, gold medalist(s)	1st place, gold medalist(s)	
1989	Hungarian International		1st place, gold medalist(s)				
1989	Hungarian Masters		1st place, gold medalist(s)				
1989	International Mixed Pairs	5					
1989	World Championships	9	19			5	
1990	Blume Memorial		7				
1990	Bolzano Grand Prix		1st place, gold medalist(s)				
1990	Chunichi Cup		3rd place, bronze medalist(s)	2nd place, silver medalist(s)	3rd place, bronze medalist(s)	2nd place, silver medalist(s)	5
1990	Cottbus International		1st place, gold medalist(s)		3rd place, bronze medalist(s)	7	1st place, gold medalist(s)
1990	DTB Cup		1st place, gold medalist(s)	1st place, gold medalist(s)	2nd place, silver medalist(s)	6	1st place, gold medalist(s)
1990	European Championships		3rd place, bronze medalist(s)		8	8	3rd place, bronze medalist(s)
1990	French International		8				
1990	Goodwill Games		3rd place, bronze medalist(s)	4	5	7	4
1990	Hungarian Championships		1st place, gold medalist(s)				
1990	Hungarian Masters		1st place, gold medalist(s)				
1990	Tokyo Cup			2nd place, silver medalist(s)			3rd place, bronze medalist(s)
1990	World Cup Final		3rd place, bronze medalist(s)	1st place, gold medalist(s)	3rd place, bronze medalist(s)	8	2nd place, silver medalist(s)
1991	Blume Memorial		4	2nd place, silver medalist(s)	4	4	2nd place, silver medalist(s)
1991	Chunichi Cup		1st place, gold medalist(s)	2nd place, silver medalist(s)	1st place, gold medalist(s)	3rd place, bronze medalist(s)	1st place, gold medalist(s)
1991	Galvan Memorial		1st place, gold medalist(s)				
1991	Hapoel Games		1st place, gold medalist(s)				
1991	Hungarian Championships		1st place, gold medalist(s)	1st place, gold medalist(s)	1st place, gold medalist(s)	1st place, gold medalist(s)	1st place, gold medalist(s)
1991	Hungarian International		1st place, gold medalist(s)		1st place, gold medalist(s)	1st place, gold medalist(s)	1st place, gold medalist(s)
1991	Hungarian Masters		1st place, gold medalist(s)				
1991	HUN-ISR Dual Meet	1st place, gold medalist(s)	1st place, gold medalist(s)				
1991	Tokyo Cup				2nd place, silver medalist(s)		1st place, gold medalist(s)
1991	World Championships	8	31	2nd place, silver medalist(s)	4	7	8
1992	McDonald's American Cup		2nd place, silver medalist(s)				
1992	Cottbus International		1st place, gold medalist(s)	1st place, gold medalist(s)	4	2nd place, silver medalist(s)	1st place, gold medalist(s)
1992	FRA-HUN Dual Meet		1st place, gold medalist(s)				
1992	Hungarian Championships		1st place, gold medalist(s)				
1992	Hungarian International		1st place, gold medalist(s)	1st place, gold medalist(s)	1st place, gold medalist(s)	1st place, gold medalist(s)	1st place, gold medalist(s)
1992	HUN-ROM Dual Meet		1st place, gold medalist(s)				
1992	International Mixed Pairs	8					
1992	Olympic Games	6	8	1st place, gold medalist(s)			2nd place, silver medalist(s)
1992	World Championships			1st place, gold medalist(s)			2nd place, silver medalist(s)
1993	Hungarian International			1st place, gold medalist(s)	1st place, gold medalist(s)	1st place, gold medalist(s)	1st place, gold medalist(s)
1993	Subaru World Open		4				
1996	Olympic Games	9					

== See also ==
- List of Olympic female gymnasts for Hungary
