= Alice Kertész =

Hungarian artistic gymnast

- Born: November 17, 1935 (age 90) Budapest, Hungary

Gymnastics career
- Discipline: Women's artistic gymnastics
- Country represented: Hungary
- Club: Budapest Honvéd
Medal record
Women's artistic gymnastics
Representing Hungary
Olympic Games
Gold medal – first place	1956 Melbourne	Team, portable apparatus
Silver medal – second place	1956 Melbourne	Team competition
World Championships
Silver medal – second place	1954 Rome	Team

Alice Kertész (also Alíz Kertész; born November 17, 1935) is a former Hungarian gymnast.

She is Jewish, and was born in Budapest, Hungary. She helped Hungary win the silver medal in the team event in gymnastics at the 1954 World Artistic Gymnastics Championships.

She won a gold medal in team exercise with portable apparatus and a silver medal in team combined exercises at the 1956 Olympics in Melbourne. She placed 6th in the uneven bars.

The Hungarian Gymnastic Federation awarded her and her fellow Olympic team members the Hungarian President's Medal in June 2011.

== See also ==
- List of select Jewish gymnasts
