= Anikó Ducza =

Hungarian gymnast (born 1942)

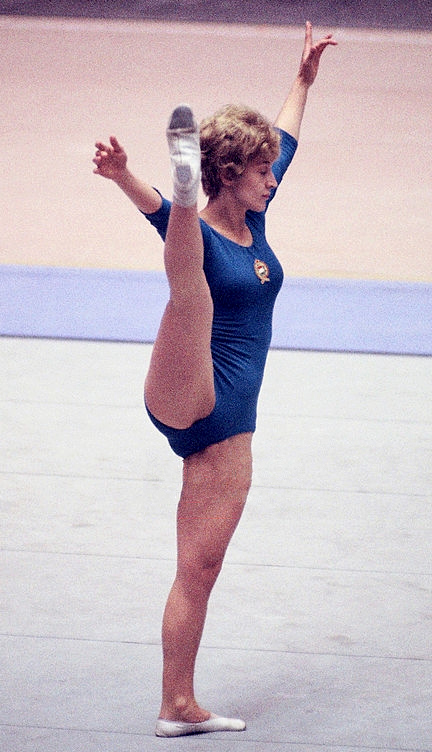
- Ducza at the 1964 Olympics

Personal information
- Full name: Anikó Ducza-Jánosi
- Born: 8 August 1942 (age 84) Budapest, Hungary
- Height: 1.61 m (5 ft 3 in)

Gymnastics career
- Discipline: Women's artistic gymnastics
- Club: Budapest Honvéd
Medal record
Representing Hungary
Olympic Games
Bronze medal – third place	1964 Tokyo	Floor Exercise
World Championships
Bronze medal – third place	1962 Prague	Balance Beam

Anikó Ducza-Jánosi (born 8 August 1942) is a retired Hungarian gymnast. She competed at the 1960, 1964 and 1968 Olympics and won a bronze medal in the floor exercise in 1964. She won another bronze medal on the balance beam at the 1962 World Championships. In 1963, she took an eleven-month break from training to give birth to her daughter, Zsuzsa Jánosi, and she began training again in early 1964. She won the 1965 Summer Universiade all-around gold, as well as a gold medal with the Hungarian team.

After finishing her gymnastics career, she became a coach. She accompanied the Hungarian team to the 1972 Summer Olympics, where they won a bronze team medal.
