= Olga Tass =

Hungarian gymnast (1929–2020)

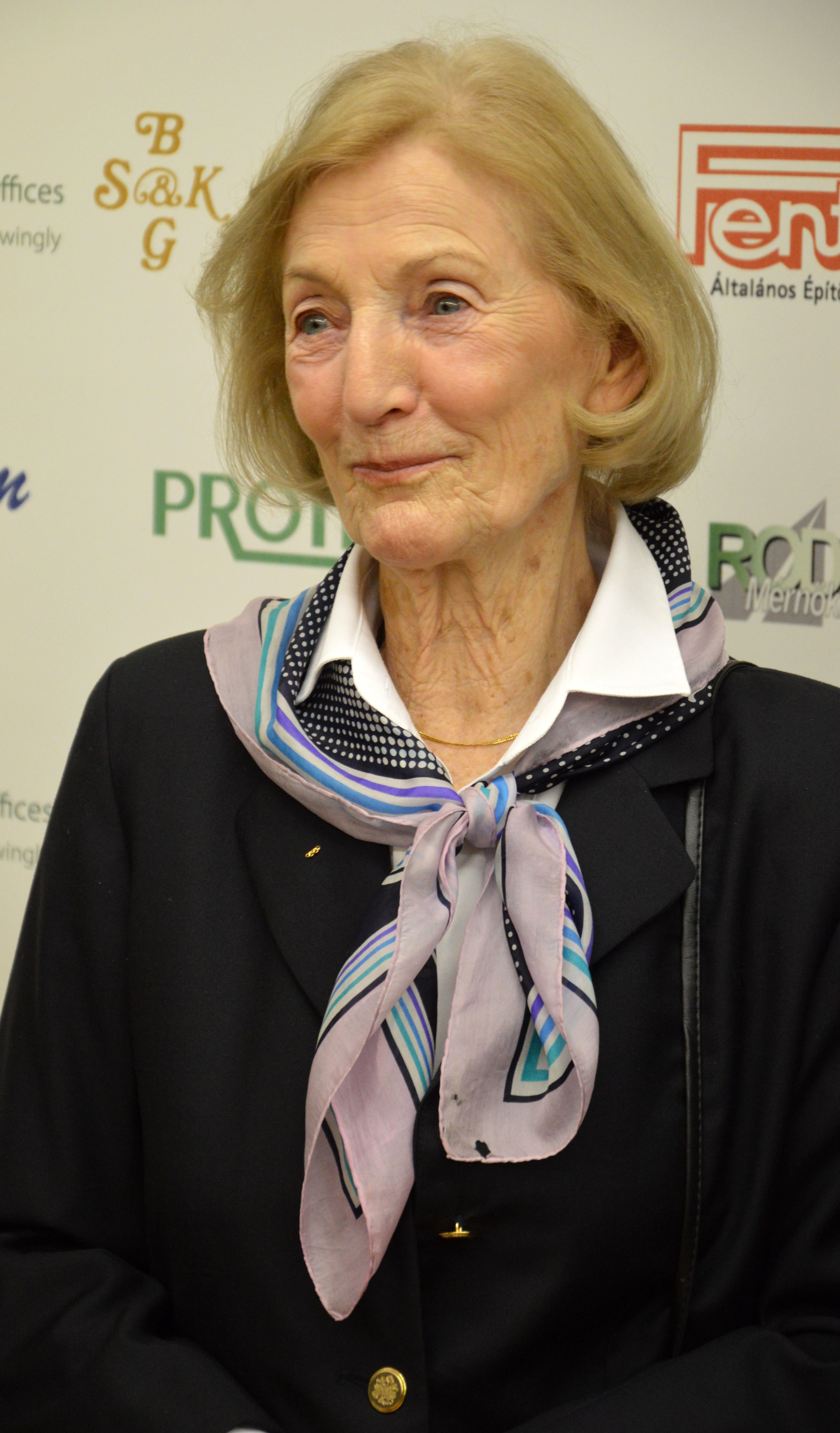
- Tass in 2014

Personal information
- Full name: Olga Tass
- Born: 29 March 1929 Pécs, Hungary
- Died: 10 July 2020 (aged 91) Budapest, Hungary
- Spouse: Dezső Lemhényi (until 2003)

Gymnastics career
- Discipline: Women's artistic gymnastics
- Country represented: Hungary (1948–1960)
- Club: Pécs EAC (1941–1947); TF (1947–1951); Bp. Honvéd (1951–1957); Bp. Spartacus (1957–1959); Bp. Vasas (1959–1960)
Medal record
Women's artistic gymnastics
Representing Hungary
Olympic Games
Gold medal – first place	1956 Melbourne	Team portable apparatus
Silver medal – second place	1948 London	Team
Silver medal – second place	1952 Helsinki	Team
Silver medal – second place	1956 Melbourne	Team
Bronze medal – third place	1952 Helsinki	Team portable apparatus
Bronze medal – third place	1956 Melbourne	Vault
World Championships
Silver medal – second place	1954 Rome	Team

Olga Tass (married name Lemhényi; 29 March 1929 – 10 July 2020) was a Hungarian gymnast who competed at the 1948, 1952, 1956, and 1960 Summer Olympics. She was born in Pécs.

== Gymnastics career ==
Tass began gymnastics in 1941 but would not be able to make her international debut until after World War II. In 1948 she competed at the Olympic Games and won a silver medal in the team competition. At the 1952 Olympic Games, Tass won a silver medal with the Hungarian team and a bronze medal in the team portable apparatus. At her third Olympic Games, she won a gold medal in the team portable apparatus, a silver in the team final, and an individual bronze on vault. She competed at her fourth Olympic Games in 1960. With four Olympic appearances, Tass held the record of most appearances by a female gymnast at the Olympics until 2008, when Oksana Chusovitina competed in her fifth Olympic Games.

== Coaching career ==
Tass studied at the University of Physical Education, becoming a teacher in 1951, a gymnastics coach in 1978, and a gymnastics master coach in 1981. She coached at the Újpesti TE prior to coaching the French national team from 1961 to 1968.

== Personal life ==
Tass was married to Dezső Lemhényi (1917–2003), a Hungarian water polo player who also competed in the 1948 and 1952 Summer Olympics. She died on 10 July 2020 at the age of 91; she is buried in Farkasréti Cemetery.

In 2021 Tass was inducted into the International Gymnastics Hall of Fame.

== See also ==
- List of Olympic female gymnasts for Hungary
- List of female artistic gymnasts with the most appearances at Olympic Games
