= Shannon Miller =

American gymnast (born 1977)

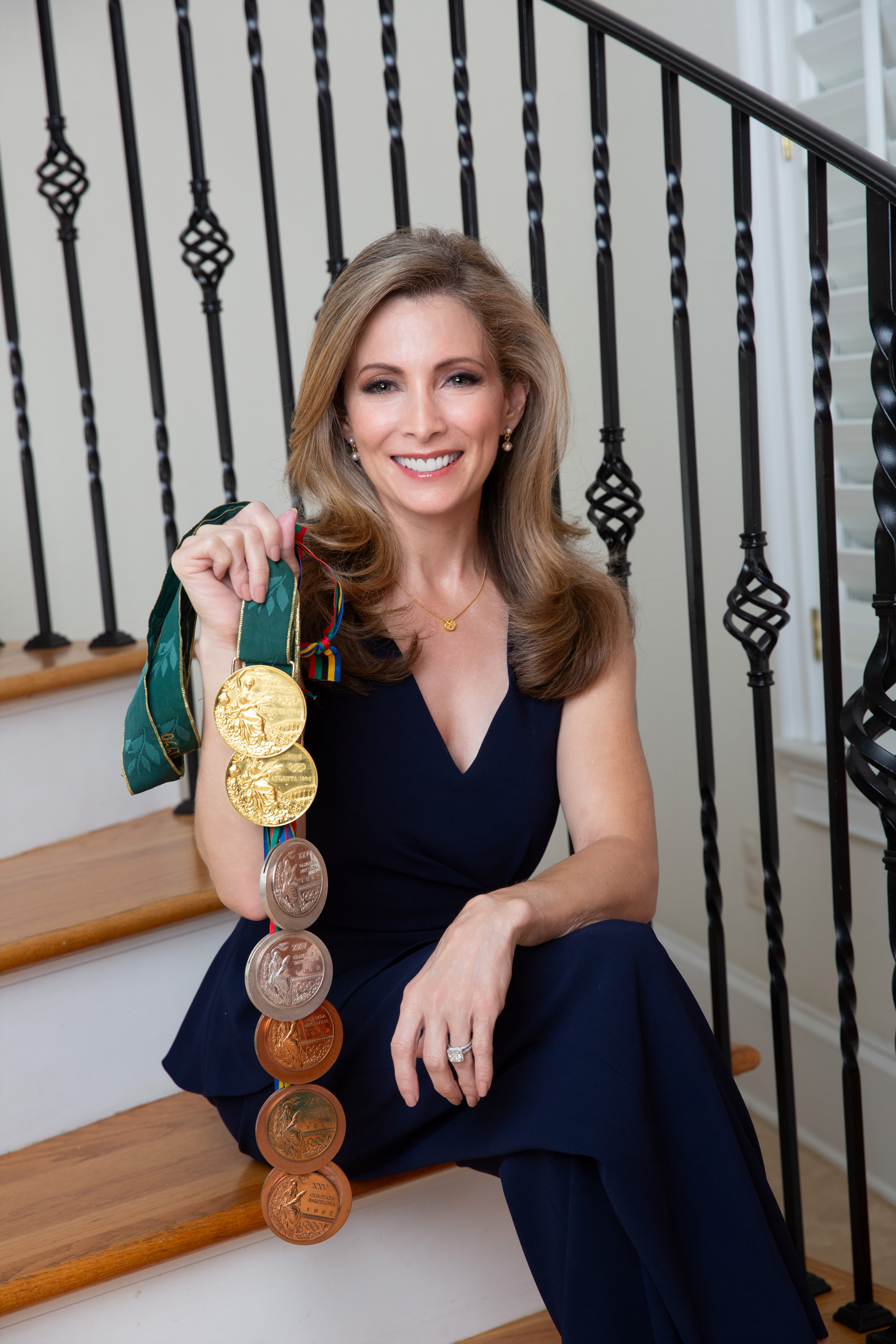
- Miller with her 7 Olympic medals

Personal information
- Full name: Shannon Lee Miller
- Born: March 10, 1977 (age 49) Rolla, Missouri, U.S.
- Height: 5 ft (152 cm)

Gymnastics career
- Discipline: Women's artistic gymnastics
- Country represented: United States; (1989–1997)
- Club: Dynamo
- Former coaches: Steve Nunno, Peggy Liddick
- Retired: August 20, 2000
Medal record
International gymnastics competitions
Event	1st	2nd	3rd
Olympic Games	2	2	3
World Championships	5	3	1
Goodwill Games	2	3	0
Pan American Games	4	1	0
Total	13	9	4
Event	1st	2nd	3rd
All-Around (OG/WC)	3	3	2
Uneven Bars (OG/WC)	1	1	1
Balance Beam (OG/WC)	2	1	0
Vault (OG/WC)	0	0	0
Floor Exercise (OG/WC)	1	0	1
Total	7	5	4
Women's artistic gymnastics
Representing United States
Olympic Games
Gold medal – first place	1996 Atlanta	Team
Gold medal – first place	1996 Atlanta	Balance Beam
Silver medal – second place	1992 Barcelona	All Around
Silver medal – second place	1992 Barcelona	Balance Beam
Bronze medal – third place	1992 Barcelona	Team
Bronze medal – third place	1992 Barcelona	Uneven Bars
Bronze medal – third place	1992 Barcelona	Floor Exercise
World Championships
Gold medal – first place	1993 Birmingham	All Around
Gold medal – first place	1993 Birmingham	Uneven Bars
Gold medal – first place	1993 Birmingham	Floor Exercise
Gold medal – first place	1994 Brisbane	All Around
Gold medal – first place	1994 Brisbane	Balance Beam
Silver medal – second place	1991 Indianapolis	Team
Silver medal – second place	1991 Indianapolis	Uneven Bars
Silver medal – second place	1994 Dortmund	Team
Bronze medal – third place	1995 Sabae	Team
Goodwill Games
Gold medal – first place	1994 St Petersburg	Balance Beam
Gold medal – first place	1994 St Petersburg	Floor Exercise
Silver medal – second place	1994 St Petersburg	All-Around
Silver medal – second place	1994 St Petersburg	Vault
Silver medal – second place	1994 St Petersburg	Uneven Bars
Pan American Games
Gold medal – first place	1995 Mar del Plata	Team
Gold medal – first place	1995 Mar del Plata	All Around
Gold medal – first place	1995 Mar del Plata	Uneven Bars
Gold medal – first place	1995 Mar del Plata	Floor Exercise
Silver medal – second place	1995 Mar del Plata	Vault

Shannon Lee Miller (born March 10, 1977) is an American former artistic gymnast. She was the 1993 and 1994 world all-around champion, the 1992 Summer Olympics all-around silver medallist, the 1996 Olympic balance beam champion, the 1995 Pan American Games all-around champion, and a member of the gold medal-winning Magnificent Seven team at the 1996 Olympics.

Miller is the second most decorated U.S. gymnast in Olympics history, with a total of seven medals, surpassed only by Simone Biles in 2024. With a combined total of 16 World Championships and Olympic medals between 1991 and 1996, she is the second-most decorated American gymnast, male or female. She was also the most successful American athlete at the 1992 Olympics, winning five medals.

== Early life ==
Miller was born in Rolla, Missouri, but she and her family moved to Edmond, Oklahoma, when she was six months old. She began gymnastics when she was five and travelled to Moscow with her mother at the age of nine to participate in a gymnastics camp.

As a teenager, Miller attended Edmond North High School, working with a flexible program that accommodated her training, travel and competition schedule.

Miller's mother was a bank vice president, and her father was a professor at the University of Central Oklahoma.

== Gymnastics career ==
=== 1989–1991 ===
For most of her career, Miller was coached by Steve Nunno and Peggy Liddick, who went on to become the national coach of the Australian women's gymnastics team.

As a 12-year-old, she finished third at the 1989 Olympic Festival, a competition designed to showcase up-and-coming talent.

She travelled to Europe in 1990 and 1991 for international meets and scored perfect 10s on the balance beam at the Swiss Cup and the Arthur Gander Memorial. At the 1991 Gander Memorial, she won the all-around with the highest total score ever recorded by an American woman under the traditional 10.0 scale: a 39.875.

At her first World Championships in 1991 in Indianapolis, Miller won two silver medals: one on the uneven bars (where she tied with Soviet gymnast Tatiana Gutsu) and one in the team competition. She placed second to Soviet Svetlana Boginskaya during the compulsory portion of the competition.

=== 1992 ===
Due to injury, Miller missed the 1992 World Championships in Paris. Not quite back up to speed with her more difficult skills, she pulled out of the optionals competition at the National Championships and petitioned to the Olympic Trials. Although the result was controversial, Miller won the Trials over her rival, Kim Zmeskal, who was the 1991 world champion.

Miller won the compulsory portion of the 1992 Olympic Games and scored the highest of any gymnast in the overall team competition, securing the bronze medal for the US women's team and advancing to the all-around final as the top-ranked gymnast in the world. In the all-around final, she missed out on the gold by the closest margin in Olympic history, finishing 0.012 points behind Gutsu. Her coach, Steve Nunno, claimed she was robbed of the gold medal by unfair judging.

In event finals, she captured three more individual medals: a silver on balance beam and bronzes on uneven bars and floor exercise. Her haul of five Olympic medals was more than that of any other American athlete in Barcelona. She was one of only two female gymnasts, along with Lavinia Miloşovici of Romania, to compete in every event final at the Games, and she alone performed all sixteen of her routines without serious error. Thirteen of her routines scored a 9.9 or higher, with her lowest score being a 9.837 in the vault final.

With her two silver and three bronze medals at the 1992 Summer Olympics, Miller holds the record for most medals won at a single Olympic Games without winning gold.

=== 1993 ===
At the 1993 World Championships in Birmingham, Miller won every event in preliminaries, and television commentator Kathy Johnson, a 1984 Olympian, remarked that she had not seen a gymnast so dominant since Nadia Comăneci in 1976. Bart Conner agreed, stating that Miller could only be beaten if she faltered. Following the break-up of the Soviet Union, its sports system had undergone upheaval, and most former Soviet gymnasts were not ready to mount a sustained challenge in 1993. Miller, on the other hand, had reworked her routines to comply better with the new Code of Points. She won the all-around title, followed by gold medals on bars and floor. However, she fell three times in the beam final and withdrew from the vault final due to illness.

=== 1994 ===
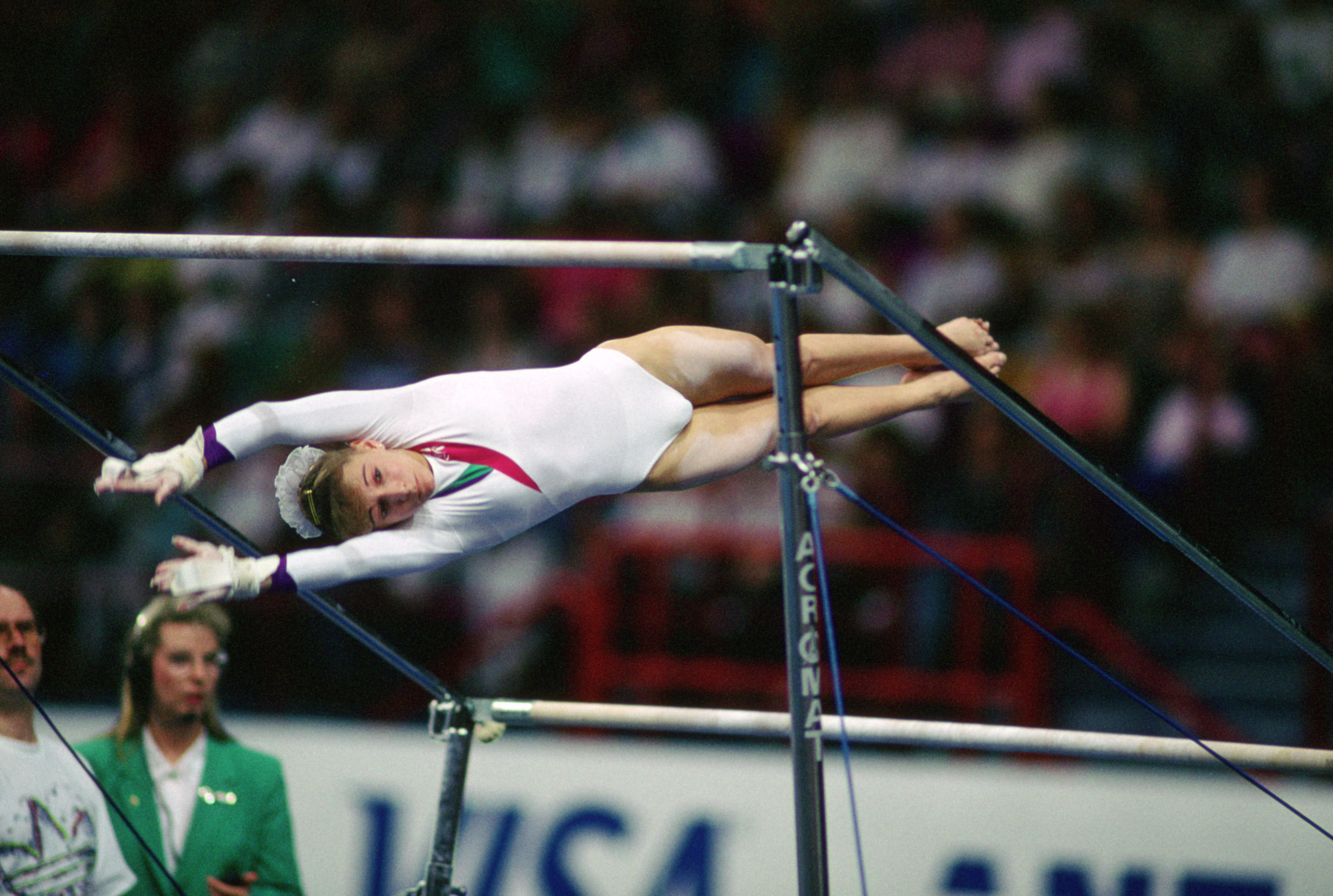
Shannon Miller in action

At the 1994 World Championships in Brisbane, Miller again took the all-around title, beating Miloşovici and becoming the first American gymnast to win back-to-back world all-around titles. She also won the beam title, which had eluded her the previous year, with a near-perfect exercise.

Her winning streak ended in late 1994 at the Goodwill Games, where Dina Kochetkova of Russia, who had finished in third place at the World Championships, defeated her by a narrow margin, 39.325 to 39.268. Miller rebounded by earning gold medals on beam and floor and silver medals on vault and bars. She missed out on medals in the team competition and the mixed team competition, both of which saw fourth-place finishes for the United States.

Two weeks later, Miller competed at the 1994 National Championships, where she won five silver medals, placing second to Dominique Dawes each time.

=== 1995 ===
Although she won the 1995 American Classic, Miller lost the 1995 National Championships to 13-year-old Dominique Moceanu. At the 1995 World Championships in Sabae, Japan, she amassed the highest total score of the American team but walked away without an individual medal. She placed seventh on the uneven bars and fourth on the balance beam, and had to withdraw from the vault and floor finals due to injury.

=== 1996 ===
Although struggling with severe tendinitis in her left wrist and a pulled hamstring, Miller won the 1996 National Championships. Once again, though, she was forced to sit out the World Championships in the Olympic year due to injury, and later the Olympic Trials. She was able to petition onto the American team as the top performer at Nationals, and the injury was sufficiently recovered by July to allow her to compete in her second Olympics.

Miller led the American team, dubbed the Magnificent Seven, to the gold medal, edging the Russian team. Kerri Strug garnered the majority of the media attention after landing her second vault on an injured foot, which forced her to withdraw from the all-around and event finals. But Miller, who was the team's highest scorer, placed second after the team competition behind Lilia Podkopayeva, qualifying her for her second Olympic all-around final.

In the all-around, Miller was ranked second halfway through the competition. In the end, she placed eighth, but she was the highest-ranking American in the competition. She also became the first American to win the balance beam final at the Olympics, as well as the first American woman to win an individual gold medal in a fully attended Olympics. She concluded her career with seven Olympic medals.

=== 1997–2000 ===
Following the Olympics, Miller and her teammates participated in a 100-city tour and several exhibitions. She competed in her final international meet in 1997, when she won the all-around title at the World University Games.

In 2000, Miller made a brief comeback attempt for the Sydney Olympics. She competed in the Olympic Trials, but after a fall on vault, she decided to withdraw from the competition despite being cleared by a doctor to continue.

=== Honors ===
Miller is a member of the USA Gymnastics Hall of Fame, the United States Olympic Hall of Fame the International Gymnastics Hall of Fame, and the Women's International Sports Hall of Fame. She is the only woman, in any sport, to be inducted into the United States Olympic Hall of Fame twice, as an individual and for her team.

With seven Olympic and nine World Championship medals, Miller is one of the most decorated American gymnasts, male or female. She is tied with Nastia Liukin for third most World Championship medals (9) won by an American gymnast, behind Simone Biles (30) and Alicia Sacramone (10).

Miller was presented with the 1993 Master of Sport Award and she was one of four finalists for the Zaharias Award in 1992, 1993, and 1994. In 1994 she won the Dial Award was named Athlete of the Year at the USA Gymnastics Congress, and was awarded the first Henry P. Iba Citizen Athlete Award.

In 1998, the Oklahoma Legislature named a section of Interstate 35 in Edmond, Oklahoma the Shannon Miller Parkway in her honor.

In 2017, Miller was inducted into the Oklahoma Hall of Fame.

In 1998, Edmond City Council renamed Liberty park to Shannon Miller Park and features an 18 ft Bronze Statue of Miller, designed by artist Shan R. Gray.

== Post-gymnastics career ==
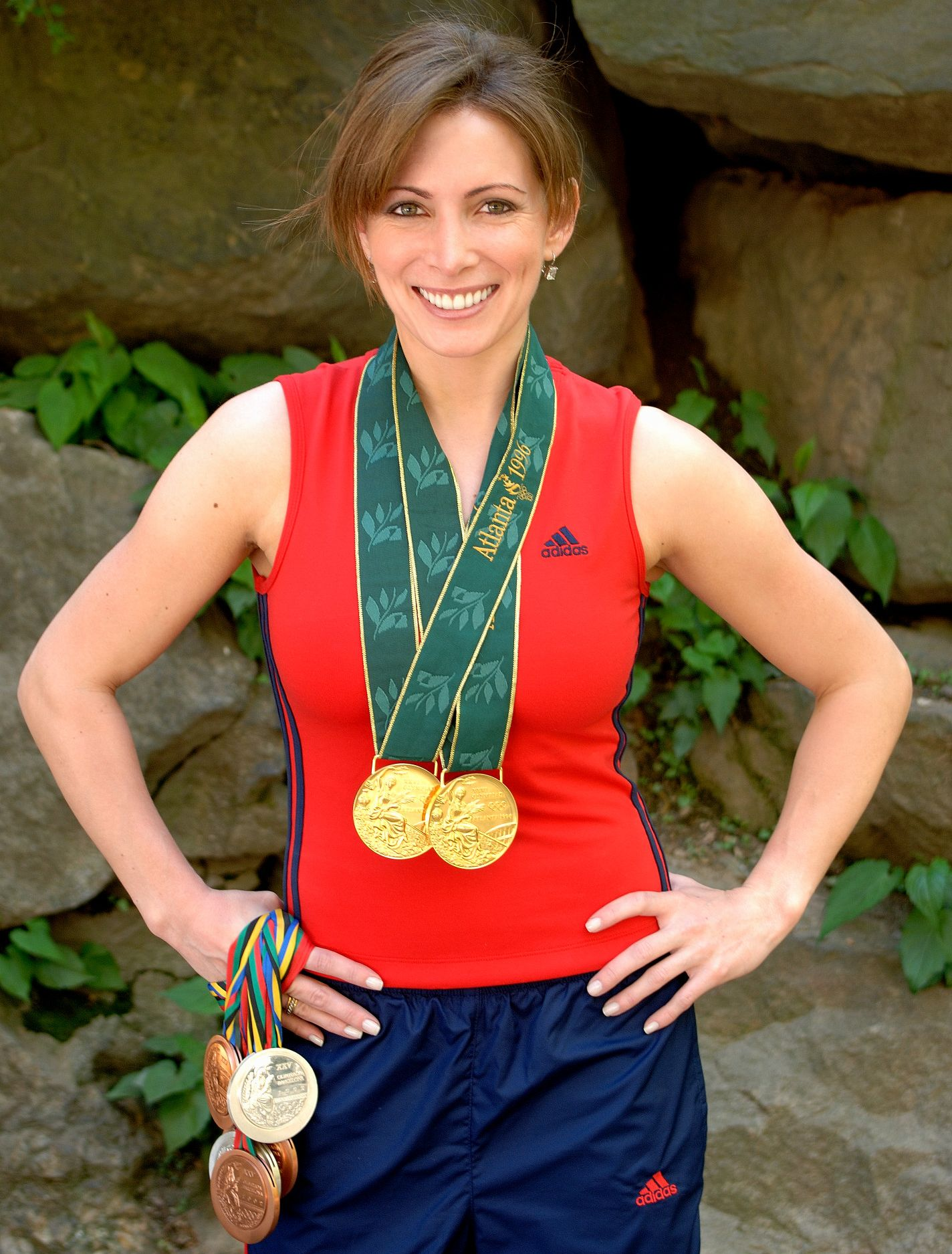
Miller in 2014

In 2003, Miller graduated from the University of Houston with a B.B.A. in marketing and entrepreneurship. She entered Boston College Law School later that year and graduated in 2007. After law school, Miller launched her company Shannon Miller Lifestyle (now Shannon Miller Worldwide) focused on helping women make their health a priority and included fitness DVD's, hosting a health focused radio show and speaking on health and wellness.

Miller was an analyst or commentator on artistic gymnastics at the 2000, 2004, 2012, 2016 and 2024 Olympic Games.She hosted Comcast Gymnastics 360 with Shannon Miller for five years.

On October 21, 2015, Miller entered a business partnership with Juice Plus for a branded line of dietary supplements. Also in 2015, her autobiography, It's Not About Perfect: Competing for My Country and Fighting for My Life, was published in 2015 by St. Martin's Press.

Miller is the president of Shannon Miller Worldwide and the Shannon Miller Foundation, which is dedicated to fighting children's issues such as obesity and cancer.

Miller is also a professional and corporate speaker on the topics of The Gold Medal Mindset: Resilience, Goals Setting, Teamwork, Mindset and Commitment to Excellence. She also speaks about survivorship as an ovarian cancer survivor.

== Personal life ==
Miller married lawyer and ophthalmologist Christopher B. Phillips in June 1999 and were divorced was finalized in 2006.

In August 2007, Miller announced her engagement to John Falconetti. They married on August 25, 2008, and have two children.

== Cancer Fight and Cancer Survivor ==
In February 2011, Miller revealed that she had been diagnosed with germ cell ovarian cancer, a month after doctors removed a baseball-sized cyst from one of her ovaries. She underwent three cycles of chemotherapy from March 7 to May 2, 2011. In June 2011, her doctor gave her a clean bill of health.

Following this, Miller used her platform to talk about taking on and defeating cancer.

== Competitive history ==
Year	Event	Team	AA	VT	UB	BB	FX
1988	U.S. Classic (junior)		2nd place, silver medalist(s)				
1989	U.S. Classic (junior)		1st place, gold medalist(s)				
1989	U.S. Olympic Festival		3rd place, bronze medalist(s)				
1990	American Classic		2nd place, silver medalist(s)				
1990	U.S. Classic		2nd place, silver medalist(s)				
1990	Swiss Cup Zürich					1st place, gold medalist(s)	
1991	U.S. Classic		2nd place, silver medalist(s)				
1991	U.S. National Championships		7	3rd place, bronze medalist(s)		1st place, gold medalist(s)	
1991	American Cup					1st place, gold medalist(s)	
1991	Arthur Gander Memorial		1st place, gold medalist(s)				
1991	DTB Cup		3rd place, bronze medalist(s)				
1991	Swiss Cup		1st place, gold medalist(s)				
1991	Indianapolis World Championships	2nd place, silver medalist(s)	6	6	2nd place, silver medalist(s)	6	4
1992	American Cup		3rd place, bronze medalist(s)	1st place, gold medalist(s)	1st place, gold medalist(s)	1st place, gold medalist(s)	
1992	International Mixed Pairs		1st place, gold medalist(s)				
1992	Olympic Trials		1st place, gold medalist(s)				
1992	Barcelona Olympic Games	3rd place, bronze medalist(s)	2nd place, silver medalist(s)	6	3rd place, bronze medalist(s)	2nd place, silver medalist(s)	3rd place, bronze medalist(s)
1993	U.S. National Championships		1st place, gold medalist(s)	2nd place, silver medalist(s)	1st place, gold medalist(s)	3rd place, bronze medalist(s)	1st place, gold medalist(s)
1993	American Cup		1st place, gold medalist(s)	1st place, gold medalist(s)	1st place, gold medalist(s)		1st place, gold medalist(s)
1993	Birmingham World Championships		1st place, gold medalist(s)		1st place, gold medalist(s)	8	1st place, gold medalist(s)
1994	U.S. National Championships		2nd place, silver medalist(s)	2nd place, silver medalist(s)	2nd place, silver medalist(s)	2nd place, silver medalist(s)	2nd place, silver medalist(s)
1994	Brisbane World Championships		1st place, gold medalist(s)	7		1st place, gold medalist(s)	4
1994	Dortmund Team World Championships	2nd place, silver medalist(s)					
1995	American Classic		1st place, gold medalist(s)				
1995	Mar del Plata Pan American Games	1st place, gold medalist(s)	1st place, gold medalist(s)	2nd place, silver medalist(s)	1st place, gold medalist(s)		1st place, gold medalist(s)
1995	U.S. National Championships		2nd place, silver medalist(s)	1st place, gold medalist(s)			3rd place, bronze medalist(s)
1995	Sabae World Championships	3rd place, bronze medalist(s)	12		7	4	
1996	U.S. National Championships		1st place, gold medalist(s)				
1996	Atlanta Olympic Games	1st place, gold medalist(s)	8	8		1st place, gold medalist(s)	
1997	International Mixed Pairs		3rd place, bronze medalist(s)				
1997	Sicily Summer Universiade	2nd place, silver medalist(s)	1st place, gold medalist(s)		4		
2000	Olympic Trials		13				

== See also ==
- List of multiple Olympic gold medalists at a single Games
- List of Olympic female gymnasts for the United States
- List of Olympic medal leaders in women's gymnastics
- List of top female medalists at the World Artistic Gymnastics Championships
