= Erzsébet Gulyás-Köteles =

Hungarian gymnast (1924–2019)

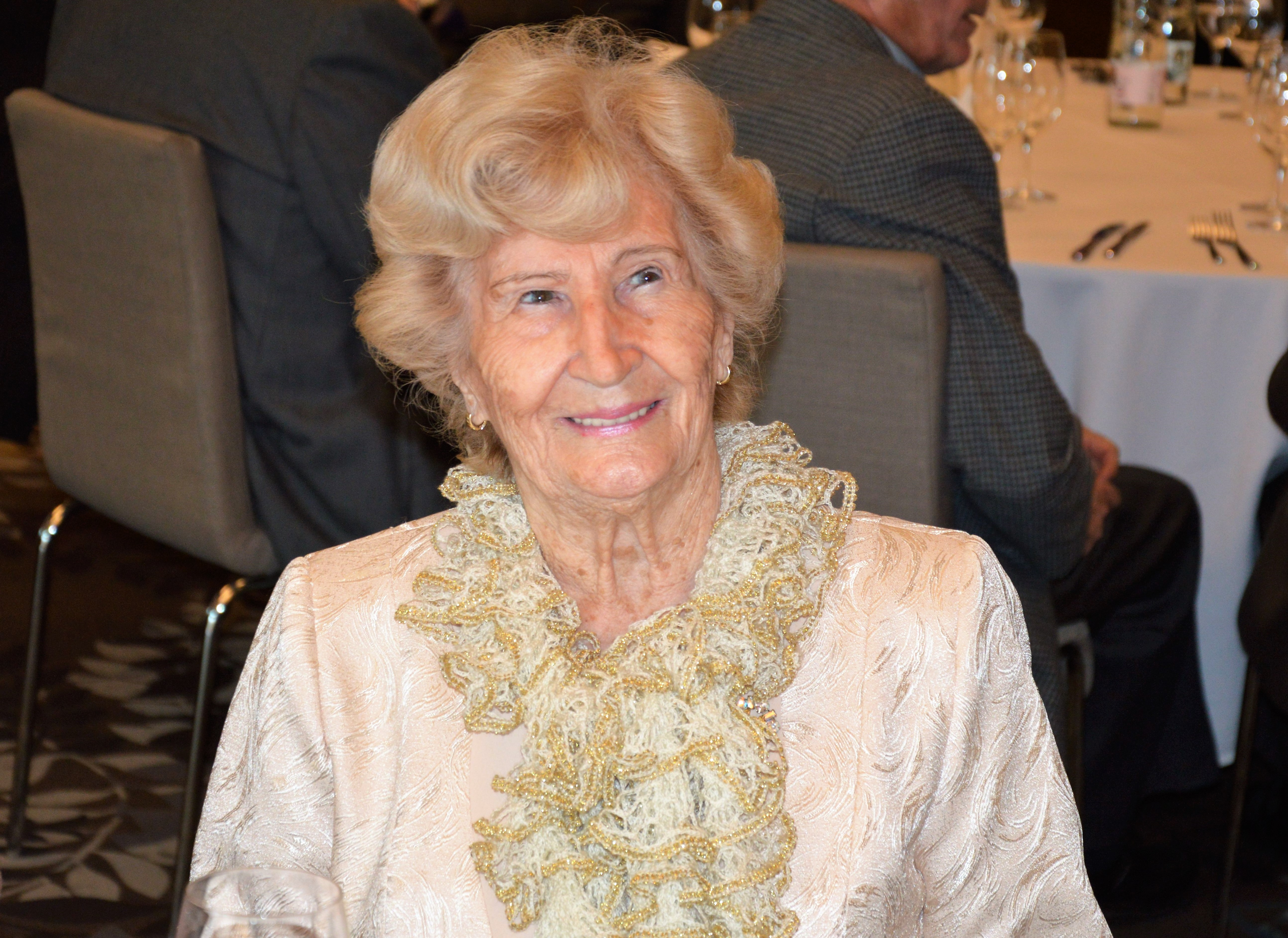
- Gulyás-Köteles in December 2013

Personal information
- Born: 3 November 1924 Budapest, Hungary
- Died: 16 June 2019 (aged 94) Budapest, Hungary

Sport
- Sport: Gymnastics
Medal record
Women's artistic gymnastics
Representing Hungary
Olympic Games
Gold medal – first place	1956 Melbourne	Team Portable Apparatus
Silver medal – second place	1948 London	Team
Silver medal – second place	1952 Helsinki	Team
Silver medal – second place	1956 Melbourne	Team
Bronze medal – third place	1952 Helsinki	Team Portable Apparatus

Erzsébet Gulyás-Köteles (3 November 1924 – 16 June 2019) was a Hungarian gymnast who competed in the 1948, 1952, and 1956 Summer Olympics.

In 1948 she competed at the Olympic Games, winning a silver medal in the team competition. At the 1952 Olympic Games, Gulyás-Köteles won a silver medal with the Hungarian team. At her third Olympic Games, she won a gold medal in the team portable apparatus, as well as a silver in the team final.

Gulyás-Köteles died in June 2019 in Budapest at the age of 94.

== See also ==
- List of Olympic female gymnasts for Hungary
- Hungary women's national gymnastics team
