= List of gymnasts at the 1956 Summer Olympics =

This is a list of the gymnasts who represented their country at the 1956 Summer Olympics in Melbourne from 22 November to 8 December 1956. Only one discipline, artistic gymnastics, was included in the Games.

== Female artistic gymnasts ==
	Name	Country	Date of birth (Age)
Youngest competitor	Muriel Davis-Grossfeld	United States	7 October 1940 (aged 16)
Oldest competitor	Pat Hirst	United Kingdom	18 November 1918 (aged 38)

NOC	Name	Date of birth (Age)	Hometown
Australia	Barbara Cunningham	28 July 1926 (aged 30)	Adelaide, South Australia
Australia	Ing Fraser	1928	Baden-Württemberg, Germany
Australia	Wendy Nicholls	22 May 1937 (aged 19)	
Bulgaria	Ivanka Dolzheva	10 September 1935 (aged 21)	Sofia, Bulgaria
Bulgaria	Saltirka Spasova-Tarpova	22 July 1933 (aged 23)	Gulyantsi, Bulgaria
Bulgaria	Tsvetanka Stancheva	18 August 1929 (aged 27)	
Canada	Ernestine Russell	6 October 1938 (aged 18)	Windsor, Ontario
Czechoslovakia	Eva Bosáková	18 December 1931 (aged 24)	Mladá Boleslav, Czechoslovakia
Czechoslovakia	Miroslava Brdíčková	4 September 1927 (aged 29)	Litomyšl, Czechoslovakia
Czechoslovakia	Věra Drazdíková	1 February 1933 (aged 23)	Prague, Czechoslovakia
Czechoslovakia	Anna Marejková	24 October 1933 (aged 23)	Turzovka, Czechoslovakia
Czechoslovakia	Matylda Matoušková-Šínová	29 March 1933 (aged 23)	Brno, Czechoslovakia
Czechoslovakia	Alena Reichová	27 July 1933 (aged 23)	Plzeň, Czechoslovakia
France	Jacqueline Dieudonné	30 June 1933 (aged 23)	Mérignac, France
France	Danièle Sicot-Coulon	24 March 1935 (aged 21)	Châteaudun, France
Great Britain	Pat Hirst	18 November 1918 (aged 38)	Wortley, England
Hungary	Erzsébet Gulyás-Köteles	3 November 1924 (aged 32)	Budapest, Hungary
Hungary	Ágnes Keleti	9 January 1921 (aged 35)	Budapest, Hungary
Hungary	Alice Kertész	17 November 1935 (aged 21)	Budapest, Hungary
Hungary	Margit Korondi	24 June 1932 (aged 24)	Celje, Yugoslavia
Hungary	Andrea Molnár-Bodó	4 August 1934 (aged 22)	Budapest, Hungary
Hungary	Olga Tass	29 March 1929 (aged 27)	Pécs, Hungary
Italy	Elisa Calsi	6 March 1937 (aged 19)	Lodi, Italy
Italy	Miranda Cicognani	12 September 1936 (aged 20)	Forlì, Italy
Italy	Rosella Cicognani	1 October 1939 (aged 17)	Forlì, Italy
Italy	Elena Lagorara	10 May 1939 (aged 17)	Sestri Ponente, Italy
Italy	Luciana Lagorara	25 November 1936 (aged 19)	Sestri Ponente, Italy
Italy	Luciana Reali	4 March 1936 (aged 20)	
Japan	Mitsuka Ikeda	15 September 1932 (aged 24)	
Japan	Kyoko Kubota	2 January 1933 (aged 23)	
Japan	Shizuko Sakashita	8 December 1933 (aged 22)	
Japan	Suzuko Seki	18 February 1936 (aged 20)	
Japan	Kazuko Sogabe	27 March 1936 (aged 20)	Kagawa Prefecture, Japan
Japan	Keiko Tanaka-Ikeda	11 November 1933 (aged 23)	Mihara, Japan
Luxembourg	Annette Krier	10 August 1937 (aged 19)	Luxembourg City, Luxembourg
Poland	Dorota Horzonek-Jokiel	3 February 1934 (aged 22)	Nowy Bytom, Poland
Poland	Natalia Kot	29 June 1938 (aged 18)	Siemianowice Śląskie, Poland
Poland	Danuta Nowak-Stachow	22 August 1934 (aged 22)	Gdynia, Poland
Poland	Helena Rakoczy	23 December 1921 (aged 34)	Kraków, Poland
Poland	Lidia Szczerbińska	30 April 1934 (aged 22)	Warsaw, Poland
Poland	Barbara Wilk-Ślizowska	4 February 1935 (aged 21)	Kraków, Poland
Romania	Georgeta Hurmuzachi	23 January 1936 (aged 20)	
Romania	Sonia Iovan	29 September 1935 (aged 21)	Cluj-Napoca, Romania
Romania	Elena Leușteanu	4 July 1935 (aged 21)	Chernivtsi, Ukrainian SSR
Romania	Elena Mărgărit	25 October 1936 (aged 20)	Timișoara, Romania
Romania	Elena Săcălici	18 July 1935 (aged 21)	Cluj-Napoca, Romania
Romania	Emilia Vătășoiu	20 October 1933 (aged 23)	Câineni, Romania
Soviet Union	Polina Astakhova	30 October 1936 (aged 20)	Zaporizhzhia, Ukrainian SSR
Soviet Union	Lidiya Kalinina-Ivanova	27 January 1937 (aged 19)	Moscow, Russian SFSR
Soviet Union	Larisa Latynina	27 December 1934 (aged 21)	Kherson, Ukrainian SSR
Soviet Union	Tamara Manina	5 September 1934 (aged 22)	Petrozavodsk, Russian SFSR
Soviet Union	Sofia Muratova	13 July 1929 (aged 27)	Saint Petersburg, Russian SFSR
Soviet Union	Lyudmila Yegorova	24 February 1931 (aged 25)	Lomonosov, Russian SFSR
Sweden	Evy Berggren	16 June 1934 (aged 22)	Skellefteå, Sweden
Sweden	Doris Hedberg	18 February 1936 (aged 20)	Skellefteå, Sweden
Sweden	Maude Karlén	25 November 1932 (aged 23)	Stockholm, Sweden
Sweden	Karin Lindberg	6 October 1929 (aged 27)	Kalix, Sweden
Sweden	Ann-Sofi Pettersson	1 January 1932 (aged 24)	Stockholm, Sweden
Sweden	Eva Rönström	29 December 1932 (aged 23)	Stockholm, Sweden
United States	Muriel Davis-Grossfeld	7 October 1940 (aged 16)	Speedway, Indiana
United States	Doris Fuchs	11 June 1938 (aged 18)	Villingen, Germany
United States	Judy Howe	25 June 1935 (aged 21)	Shippingport, Pennsylvania
United States	Jackie Klein	11 July 1937 (aged 19)	Chicago, Illinois
United States	Joyce Racek	16 August 1938 (aged 18)	West Point, Wisconsin
United States	Sandra Ruddick	3 September 1932 (aged 24)	Indianapolis, Indiana

== Male artistic gymnasts ==
	Name	Country	Date of birth (Age)
Youngest competitor	Sham Lal	India	15 July 1938 (aged 18)
Oldest competitor	Masao Takemoto	Japan	29 September 1919 (aged 37)

NOC	Name	Date of birth (Age)	Hometown
Australia	Brian Blackburn	15 October 1928 (aged 28)	Sydney, New South Wales
Australia	Graham Bond	6 May 1937 (aged 19)	Wondai, Queensland
Australia	David Gourlay	1937	
Australia	John Lees	1931	
Australia	Noel Punton	23 December 1931 (aged 24)	
Australia	Bruce Sharp	24 March 1931 (aged 25)	
Austria	Hans Sauter	6 June 1925 (aged 31)	Bregenz, Austria
Bulgaria	Velik Kapsazov	15 April 1935 (aged 21)	Asenovgrad, Bulgaria
Bulgaria	Stoyan Stoyanov	25 October 1931 (aged 25)	Nikolovo, Bulgaria
Bulgaria	Mincho Todorov	26 December 1931 (aged 24)	Krivnya, Bulgaria
Canada	Ed Gagnier	1 February 1936 (aged 20)	Windsor, Ontario
Cuba	Rafael Lecuona	2 June 1928 (aged 28)	Havana, Cuba
Czechoslovakia	Jaroslav Bím	12 January 1931 (aged 25)	Kyjov, Czechoslovakia
Czechoslovakia	Ferdinand Daniš	7 January 1929 (aged 27)	Lučenec, Czechoslovakia
Czechoslovakia	Vladimír Kejř	20 January 1929 (aged 27)	Úvaly, Czechoslovakia
Czechoslovakia	Jaroslav Mikoška	21 December 1933 (aged 22)	Zlín, Czechoslovakia
Czechoslovakia	Zdeněk Růžička	15 April 1925 (aged 31)	Ivančice, Czechoslovakia
Czechoslovakia	Josef Škvor	8 December 1929 (aged 26)	Dojetřice, Czechoslovakia
Finland	Raimo Heinonen	29 May 1935 (aged 21)	Turku, Finland
Finland	Onni Lappalainen	30 July 1922 (aged 34)	Mikkeli, Finland
Finland	Olavi Leimuvirta	26 November 1935 (aged 20)	Helsinki, Finland
Finland	Berndt Lindfors	21 October 1932 (aged 24)	Helsinki, Finland
Finland	Martti Mansikka	25 October 1933 (aged 23)	Antrea, Finland
Finland	Kalevi Suoniemi	14 July 1931 (aged 25)	Tampere, Finland
France	Raymond Dot	20 December 1926 (aged 29)	Puteaux, France
France	Jean Guillou	24 June 1931 (aged 25)	Plouédern, France
France	Michel Mathiot	23 August 1926 (aged 30)	Besançon, France
United Team of Germany	Helmut Bantz	14 September 1921 (aged 35)	Speyer, Germany
United Team of Germany	Jakob Kiefer	3 December 1919 (aged 36)	Bad Kreuznach, Germany
United Team of Germany	Robert Klein	10 December 1925 (aged 30)	Cologne, Germany
United Team of Germany	Hans Pfann	14 September 1920 (aged 36)	Nuremberg, Germany
United Team of Germany	Erich Wied	6 February 1923 (aged 33)	Stuttgart, Germany
United Team of Germany	Theo Wied	6 February 1923 (aged 33)	Stuttgart, Germany
Great Britain	Nik Stuart	20 July 1927 (aged 29)	Thirsk, England
Great Britain	Frank Turner	5 November 1922 (aged 34)	
Hungary	János Héder	20 October 1933 (aged 23)	Budapest, Hungary
Hungary	Attila Takács	19 January 1929 (aged 27)	Budapest, Hungary
India	Sham Lal	15 July 1938 (aged 18)	Lahore, India
India	Anant Ram	21 October 1932 (aged 24)	Behran, India
India	Pritam Singh	17 October 1924 (aged 32)	Garhshankar, India
Japan	Nobuyuki Aihara	16 December 1934 (aged 21)	Takasaki, Japan
Japan	Akira Kono	11 September 1929 (aged 27)	Uwajima, Japan
Japan	Masami Kubota	6 December 1931 (aged 24)	Okayama, Japan
Japan	Takashi Ono	26 July 1931 (aged 25)	Noshiro, Japan
Japan	Masao Takemoto	29 September 1919 (aged 37)	Hamada, Japan
Japan	Shinsaku Tsukawaki	3 January 1931 (aged 25)	Omuta, Japan
Luxembourg	Josy Stoffel	27 June 1928 (aged 28)	Differdange, Luxembourg
South Africa	Ronnie Lombard	28 July 1928 (aged 28)	Namibia
South Africa	Jack Wells	3 October 1926 (aged 30)	Bloemfontein, South Africa
Soviet Union	Albert Azaryan	11 March 1929 (aged 27)	Ganja, Azerbaijan SSR
Soviet Union	Viktor Chukarin	9 November 1921 (aged 35)	Krasnoarmeyskoye, Ukrainian SSR
Soviet Union	Valentin Muratov	30 July 1928 (aged 28)	Kostyukovo, Russian SFSR
Soviet Union	Boris Shakhlin	27 January 1932 (aged 24)	Ishim, Russian SFSR
Soviet Union	Pavel Stolbov	30 August 1929 (aged 27)	Krasnyi Luch, Ukrainian SSR
Soviet Union	Yuri Titov	27 November 1935 (aged 20)	Omsk, Russian SFSR
Sweden	William Thoresson	31 May 1932 (aged 24)	Gothenburg, Sweden
Sweden	Kurt Wigartz	21 March 1933 (aged 23)	Mariestad, Sweden
United States	Dick Beckner	24 November 1927 (aged 28)	Los Angeles, California
United States	Jack Beckner	9 June 1930 (aged 26)	Los Angeles, California
United States	Abie Grossfeld	1 March 1934 (aged 22)	New York, New York
United States	Charles Simms	24 January 1928 (aged 28)	New York, New York
United States	Bill Tom	8 March 1923 (aged 33)	San Francisco, California
United States	Armando Vega	24 October 1935 (aged 21)	Hurley, New Mexico
