= Gymnastics at the 1956 Summer Olympics – Women's floor =

Women's floor at the Games of the XVI Olympiad
- Venue: West Melbourne Stadium
- Date: 3–7 December 1956
- Competitors: 64 from 15 nations

Medalists
1st place, gold medalist(s)		Ágnes Keleti	Hungary
1st place, gold medalist(s)		Larisa Latynina	Soviet Union
3rd place, bronze medalist(s)		Elena Leuşteanu	Romania

These are the results of the women's floor competition, one of six events for female competitors in artistic gymnastics at the 1956 Summer Olympics in Melbourne.

== Competition format ==
The gymnastics format continued to use the aggregation format. Each nation entered either a team of six gymnasts or up to three individual gymnasts. All entrants in the gymnastics competitions performed both a compulsory exercise and a voluntary exercise for each apparatus. The 2 exercise scores were summed to give an apparatus total. No separate finals were contested.

Exercise scores ranged from 0 to 10 and apparatus scores from 0 to 20.

== Results ==
The results of the competition:

Rank	Gymnast	Nation	Compulsory	Voluntary	Total
1st place, gold medalist(s)	Larysa Latynina	Soviet Union	9.266	9.466	18.733
1st place, gold medalist(s)	Ágnes Keleti	Hungary	9.266	9.466	18.733
3rd place, bronze medalist(s)	Elena Leușteanu	Romania	9.266	9.433	18.700
4	Sofia Muratova	Soviet Union	9.300	9.266	18.566
4	Keiko Tanaka-Ikeda	Japan	9.300	9.266	18.566
4	Eva Bosáková-Věchtová	Czechoslovakia	9.233	9.333	18.566
7	Olga Tass-Lemhényi	Hungary	9.266	9.266	18.533
8	Doris Hedberg	Sweden	9.266	9.233	18.500
9	Tamara Manina	Soviet Union	9.200	9.266	18.466
9	Lyudmila Yegorova	Soviet Union	9.000	9.466	18.466
11	Georgeta Hurmuzachi	Romania	9.266	9.166	18.433
11	Lidiya Kalinina-Ivanova	Soviet Union	9.266	9.166	18.433
13	Polina Astakhova	Soviet Union	9.166	9.233	18.400
14	Helena Rakoczy	Poland	9.133	9.233	18.366
14	Natalia Kot	Poland	9.133	9.233	18.366
14	Anna Marejková	Czechoslovakia	9.200	9.166	18.366
17	Elena Mărgărit	Romania	9.166	9.166	18.333
18	Eva Rönström	Sweden	9.133	9.100	18.233
18	Mitsuka Ikeda	Japan	9.100	9.133	18.233
20	Sonia Iovan-Inovan	Romania	9.133	9.066	18.200
20	Ernestine Russell-Carter	Canada	9.000	9.200	18.200
22	Ann-Sofi Pettersson-Colling	Sweden	9.066	9.100	18.166
22	Miranda Cicognani	Italy	9.166	9.000	18.166
22	Shizuko Sakashita	Japan	9.033	9.133	18.166
25	Margit Korondi	Hungary	9.033	9.100	18.133
25	Kazuko Sogabe	Japan	9.033	9.100	18.133
25	Maude Karlén	Sweden	9.000	9.133	18.133
25	Tsvetanka Stancheva	Bulgaria	9.066	9.066	18.133
25	Muriel Davis-Grossfeld	United States	9.100	9.033	18.133
30	Andrea Bodó-Molnár	Hungary	9.166	8.933	18.100
30	Elena Săcălici	Romania	9.066	9.033	18.100
30	Saltirka Spasova-Tarpova	Bulgaria	9.000	9.100	18.100
33	Erzsébet Gulyás-Köteles	Hungary	8.966	9.100	18.066
34	Aliz Kertész	Hungary	9.066	8.966	18.033
35	Suzuko Seki	Japan	8.966	9.000	17.966
35	Kyoko Kubota	Japan	8.900	9.066	17.966
37	Matylda Matoušková-Šínová	Czechoslovakia	9.000	8.933	17.933
38	Věra Drazdíková	Czechoslovakia	9.033	8.866	17.900
39	Karin Lindberg	Sweden	9.033	8.833	17.866
39	Rosella Cicognani	Italy	8.666	9.200	17.866
39	Annette Krier	Luxembourg	8.966	8.900	17.866
42	Joyce Racek	United States	8.766	9.066	17.833
42	Danuta Nowak-Stachow	Poland	8.700	9.133	17.833
44	Ivanka Dolzheva	Bulgaria	8.800	9.000	17.800
44	Doris Fuchs	United States	8.966	8.833	17.800
44	Evy Berggren	Sweden	8.966	8.833	17.800
47	Lidia Szczerbińska	Poland	8.833	8.900	17.733
47	Barbara Wilk-Ślizowska	Poland	8.933	8.800	17.733
47	Danièle Sicot-Coulon	France	8.700	9.033	17.733
50	Emilia Vătăşoiu-Liţă	Romania	8.833	8.866	17.700
51	Elena Lagorara	Italy	8.633	9.033	17.666
52	Elisa Calsi	Italy	8.800	8.766	17.566
53	Luciana Lagorara	Italy	8.700	8.833	17.533
53	Sandra Ruddick	United States	9.100	8.433	17.533
53	Miroslava Brdíčková	Czechoslovakia	8.766	8.766	17.533
56	Luciana Reali	Italy	8.500	8.966	17.466
57	Alena Reichová	Czechoslovakia	8.933	8.500	17.433
57	Jackie Klein	United States	8.900	8.533	17.433
59	Dorota Horzonek-Jokiel	Poland	8.333	9.033	17.366
60	Judy Howe	United States	8.733	8.333	17.066
61	Ing Fraser	Australia	8.766	7.933	16.700
62	Barbara Cunningham	Australia	8.266	7.666	15.933
63	Pat Hirst	Great Britain	8.566	7.200	15.766
64	Wendy Nicholls	Australia	7.766	7.933	15.700
