= Gymnastics at the 1956 Summer Olympics – Women's artistic individual all-around =

Women's artistic individual all-around at the Games of the XVI Olympiad
- Venue: West Melbourne Stadium
- Date: 3–7 December 1956
- Competitors: 65 from 15 nations

Medalists
1st place, gold medalist(s)		Larisa Latynina	Soviet Union
2nd place, silver medalist(s)		Ágnes Keleti	Hungary
3rd place, bronze medalist(s)		Sofia Muratova	Soviet Union

These are the results of the women's artistic individual all-around competition, one of six events for female competitors in artistic gymnastics at the 1956 Summer Olympics in Melbourne.

== Competition format ==
The gymnastics competition continued to use the aggregation format. Each nation entered either a team of six gymnasts or up to three individual gymnasts. All entrants in the gymnastics competitions performed both a compulsory exercise and a voluntary exercise for each apparatus. The 8 exercise scores were summed to give an individual all-around total. No separate finals were contested.

Exercise scores ranged from 0 to 10, apparatus scores from 0 to 20, and individual totals from 0 to 80.

== Results ==
The results of the individual all-around:

Rank	Gymnast	Nation	Exercise results												Total
Rank	Gymnast	Nation	Floor (gymnastics)			Balance beam			Parallel bars			Vault (gymnastics)			Total
Rank	Gymnast	Nation	C	V	T	C	V	T	C	V	T	C	V	T	Total
1st place, gold medalist(s)	Larisa Latynina	Soviet Union	9.266	9.466	18.733	9.300	9.233	18.533	9.233	9.600	18.833	9.433	9.400	18.833	74.933
2nd place, silver medalist(s)	Ágnes Keleti	Hungary	9.266	9.466	18.733	9.433	9.366	18.800	9.533	9.433	18.966	8.833	9.300	18.133	74.633
3rd place, bronze medalist(s)	Sofia Muratova	Soviet Union	9.300	9.266	18.566	9.166	9.266	18.433	9.300	9.500	18.800	9.500	9.166	18.666	74.466
4	Olga Tass	Hungary	9.266	9.266	18.533	9.233	9.233	18.466	9.366	9.266	18.633	9.166	9.566	18.733	74.366
4	Elena Leușteanu	Romania	9.266	9.433	18.700	9.300	9.200	18.500	9.466	9.066	18.533	9.266	9.366	18.633	74.366
6	Tamara Manina	Soviet Union	9.200	9.266	18.466	9.233	9.400	18.633	9.000	9.333	18.333	9.466	9.333	18.800	74.233
7	Eva Bosáková	Czechoslovakia	9.233	9.333	18.566	9.300	9.333	18.633	9.400	9.333	18.733	9.000	9.166	18.166	74.100
8	Helena Rakoczy	Poland	9.133	9.233	18.366	9.033	9.100	18.133	9.166	9.533	18.700	9.233	9.266	18.500	73.700
9	Natalia Kot	Poland	9.133	9.233	18.366	9.100	9.066	18.166	9.266	9.333	18.600	9.333	9.166	18.500	73.633
10	Lyudmila Yegorova	Soviet Union	9.000	9.466	18.466	9.100	9.366	18.466	8.833	9.300	18.133	9.200	9.266	18.466	73.533
11	Anna Marejková	Czechoslovakia	9.200	9.166	18.366	9.300	9.233	18.533	9.100	9.266	18.366	9.133	9.100	18.233	73.500
12	Margit Korondi	Hungary	9.033	9.100	18.133	9.266	9.200	18.466	9.100	9.400	18.500	8.900	9.333	18.233	73.333
13	Keiko Tanaka-Ikeda	Japan	9.300	9.266	18.566	9.266	8.733	18.000	9.033	9.266	18.300	9.133	9.100	18.233	73.100
14	Andrea Molnár-Bodó	Hungary	9.166	8.933	18.100	9.066	9.066	18.133	9.233	9.166	18.400	9.066	9.200	18.266	72.900
14	Sonia Iovan	Romania	9.133	9.066	18.200	9.100	9.166	18.266	9.100	9.066	18.166	9.100	9.166	18.266	72.900
16	Georgeta Hurmuzachi	Romania	9.266	9.166	18.433	8.933	8.833	17.766	9.033	9.233	18.266	8.966	9.300	18.266	72.733
17	Polina Astakhova	Soviet Union	9.166	9.233	18.400	9.066	9.100	18.166	9.200	9.366	18.566	8.733	8.833	17.566	72.700
18	Erzsébet Gulyás-Köteles	Hungary	8.966	9.100	18.066	9.066	9.033	18.100	9.000	9.133	18.133	8.866	9.033	17.900	72.200
19	Ivanka Dolzheva	Bulgaria	8.800	9.000	17.800	8.800	9.066	17.866	9.100	9.266	18.366	8.900	9.200	18.100	72.133
20	Emilia Vătășoiu	Romania	8.833	8.866	17.700	9.100	9.133	18.233	8.966	9.133	18.100	8.900	9.166	18.066	72.100
21	Lidiya Kalinina-Ivanova	Soviet Union	9.266	9.166	18.433	8.900	9.100	18.000	9.033	9.233	18.266	9.200	8.133	17.333	72.033
21	Elena Mărgărit	Romania	9.166	9.166	18.333	8.833	8.800	17.633	8.833	9.100	17.933	8.933	9.200	18.133	72.033
23	Mitsuka Ikeda	Japan	9.100	9.133	18.233	9.033	8.400	17.433	8.966	9.200	18.166	9.133	8.933	18.066	71.900
24	Kazuko Sogabe	Japan	9.033	9.100	18.133	9.066	9.100	18.166	8.433	8.966	17.400	9.066	9.066	18.133	71.833
25	Danuta Nowak-Stachow	Poland	8.700	9.133	17.833	8.633	8.933	17.566	9.166	9.366	18.533	8.966	8.900	17.866	71.800
25	Matylda Matoušková-Šínová	Czechoslovakia	9.000	8.933	17.933	8.566	8.900	17.466	9.200	9.000	18.200	9.033	9.166	18.200	71.800
27	Dorota Horzonek-Jokiel	Poland	8.333	9.033	17.366	8.833	9.033	17.866	8.966	9.233	18.200	9.133	9.100	18.233	71.666
28	Miranda Cicognani	Italy	9.166	9.000	18.166	9.033	8.100	17.133	8.900	8.966	17.866	9.066	9.366	18.433	71.600
29	Shizuko Sakashita	Japan	9.033	9.133	18.166	8.966	9.166	18.133	8.700	9.000	17.700	8.800	8.700	17.500	71.500
30	Elena Săcălici	Romania	9.066	9.033	18.100	8.966	8.333	17.300	8.900	9.033	17.933	8.866	9.233	18.100	71.433
31	Ann-Sofi Pettersson	Sweden	9.066	9.100	18.166	8.600	8.800	17.400	8.333	8.766	17.100	9.433	9.300	18.733	71.400
32	Věra Drazdíková	Czechoslovakia	9.033	8.866	17.900	8.766	9.033	17.800	8.733	9.033	17.766	9.000	8.866	17.866	71.333
33	Tsvetanka Stancheva	Bulgaria	9.066	9.066	18.133	8.366	9.200	17.566	8.733	9.033	17.766	8.933	8.866	17.800	71.266
34	Kyoko Kubota	Japan	8.900	9.066	17.966	8.966	9.100	18.066	8.666	8.866	17.533	8.733	8.833	17.566	71.133
35	Suzuko Seki	Japan	8.966	9.000	17.966	9.100	8.400	17.500	8.533	9.133	17.666	9.000	8.866	17.866	71.000
36	Saltirka Spasova-Tarpova	Bulgaria	9.000	9.100	18.100	8.700	8.133	16.833	8.866	9.166	18.033	8.900	9.100	18.000	70.966
37	Luciana Reali	Italy	8.500	8.966	17.466	8.700	8.700	17.400	8.766	9.100	17.866	9.000	9.200	18.200	70.933
37	Eva Rönström	Sweden	9.133	9.100	18.233	8.166	8.733	16.900	8.700	9.000	17.700	8.900	9.200	18.100	70.933
39	Alena Reichová	Czechoslovakia	8.933	8.500	17.433	8.600	8.900	17.500	8.900	9.033	17.933	9.000	9.000	18.000	70.866
40	Miroslava Brdíčková	Czechoslovakia	8.766	8.766	17.533	8.800	8.766	17.566	8.966	9.033	18.000	8.866	8.866	17.333	70.833
41	Danièle Sicot-Coulon	France	8.700	9.033	17.733	8.900	9.000	17.900	8.766	9.000	17.766	8.400	9.000	17.400	70.800
42	Rosella Cicognani	Italy	8.666	9.200	17.866	8.566	8.866	17.433	8.566	8.866	17.433	8.733	9.300	18.033	70.766
43	Elisa Calsi	Italy	8.800	8.766	17.566	9.000	8.933	17.933	8.700	9.000	17.700	8.700	8.833	17.533	70.733
44	Elena Lagorara	Italy	8.633	9.033	17.666	8.633	8.666	17.300	8.533	8.900	17.433	8.933	9.366	18.300	70.700
45	Barbara Wilk-Ślizowska	Poland	8.933	8.800	17.733	8.700	8.633	17.333	8.833	9.066	17.900	8.833	8.733	17.566	70.533
46	Doris Hedberg	Sweden	9.266	9.233	18.500	8.466	7.933	16.400	8.066	9.066	17.133	9.200	9.233	18.433	70.466
47	Lidia Szczerbińska	Poland	8.833	8.900	17.733	8.866	8.766	17.633	8.433	8.766	17.200	9.033	8.700	17.733	70.300
48	Karin Lindberg	Sweden	9.033	8.833	17.866	8.266	8.966	17.233	8.100	8.700	16.800	8.866	9.266	18.133	70.033
49	Evy Berggren	Sweden	8.966	8.833	17.800	8.000	8.866	16.866	8.533	8.800	17.333	9.100	8.866	17.966	69.966
50	Luciana Lagorara	Italy	8.700	8.833	17.533	8.566	8.566	17.133	8.433	8.666	17.100	8.800	9.133	17.933	69.700
51	Sandra Ruddick	United States	9.100	8.433	17.533	8.333	8.133	16.466	8.800	8.533	17.333	8.933	8.866	17.800	69.133
52	Muriel Davis-Grossfeld	United States	9.100	9.033	18.133	8.633	8.966	17.600	8.533	7.700	16.233	8.633	8.333	16.966	68.933
53	Maude Karlén	Sweden	9.000	9.133	18.133	8.033	8.866	16.900	7.966	7.766	15.733	8.966	9.066	18.033	68.800
54	Joyce Racek	United States	8.766	9.066	17.833	8.600	7.733	16.333	8.266	8.033	16.300	8.900	9.133	18.033	68.500
55	Jackie Klein	United States	8.900	8.533	17.433	8.366	8.733	17.100	8.233	8.233	16.466	8.633	8.666	17.300	68.300
56	Ernestine Russell	Canada	9.000	9.200	18.200	8.666	7.000	15.766	7.966	8.166	16.133	9.000	8.833	17.833	67.933
57	Doris Fuchs	United States	8.966	8.833	17.800	8.300	6.633	14.933	8.500	8.500	17.000	8.966	9.033	18.000	67.733
58	Judy Howe	United States	8.733	8.333	17.066	8.466	8.400	16.866	8.500	8.500	17.000	8.600	7.666	16.266	67.200
59	Annette Krier	Luxembourg	8.966	8.900	17.866	7.433	8.533	15.966	8.200	8.400	16.600	8.033	7.800	15.833	66.266
60	Pat Hirst	Great Britain	8.566	7.200	15.766	7.733	8.166	15.900	8.100	8.166	16.266	8.966	8.933	17.900	65.833
61	Alice Kertész	Hungary	9.066	8.966	18.033	9.300	8.666	17.966	9.333	9.300	18.633	8.766	–	8.766	63.400
62	Ing Fraser	Australia	8.766	7.933	16.700	8.200	7.533	15.733	8.000	7.633	15.633	7.733	6.633	14.366	62.433
63	Barbara Cunningham	Australia	8.266	7.666	15.933	7.966	6.233	14.200	7.933	8.233	16.166	7.800	7.600	15.400	61.700
64	Wendy Nicholls	Australia	7.766	7.933	15.700	8.333	8.033	16.366	6.866	7.966	14.833	5.933	7.700	13.633	60.533
65	Jacqueline Dieudonné	France	–	–	–	–	–	–	8.266	–	8.266	–	–	–	8.266
