= Gymnastics at the 1956 Summer Olympics – Women's uneven bars =

Women's uneven bars at the Games of the XVI Olympiad
- Venue: West Melbourne Stadium
- Date: 3–7 December 1956
- Competitors: 65 from 15 nations

Medalists
1st place, gold medalist(s)		Ágnes Keleti	Hungary
2nd place, silver medalist(s)		Larisa Latynina	Soviet Union
3rd place, bronze medalist(s)		Sofia Muratova	Soviet Union

These are the results of the women's uneven bars competition, one of six events for female competitors in artistic gymnastics at the 1956 Summer Olympics in Melbourne.

== Competition format ==
The gymnastics format continued to use the aggregation format. Each nation entered either a team of six gymnasts or up to three individual gymnasts. All entrants in the gymnastics competitions performed both a compulsory exercise and a voluntary exercise for each apparatus. The 2 exercise scores were summed to give an apparatus total. No separate finals were contested.

Exercise scores ranged from 0 to 10 and apparatus scores from 0 to 20.

== Results ==
The results of the competition:

Rank	Gymnast	Nation	Compulsory	Voluntary	Total
1st place, gold medalist(s)	Ágnes Keleti	Hungary	9.533	9.433	18.966
2nd place, silver medalist(s)	Larysa Latynina	Soviet Union	9.233	9.600	18.833
3rd place, bronze medalist(s)	Sofia Muratova	Soviet Union	9.300	9.500	18.800
4	Eva Bosáková-Věchtová	Czechoslovakia	9.400	9.333	18.733
5	Helena Rakoczy	Poland	9.166	9.533	18.700
6	Olga Tass-Lemhényi	Hungary	9.366	9.266	18.633
6	Aliz Kertész	Hungary	9.333	9.300	18.633
8	Natalia Kot	Poland	9.266	9.333	18.600
9	Polina Astakhova	Soviet Union	9.200	9.366	18.566
10	Elena Leușteanu	Romania	9.466	9.066	18.533
10	Danuta Nowak-Stachow	Poland	9.166	9.366	18.533
12	Margit Korondi	Hungary	9.100	9.400	18.500
13	Andrea Bodó-Molnár	Hungary	9.233	9.166	18.400
14	Anna Marejková	Czechoslovakia	9.100	9.266	18.366
14	Ivanka Dolzheva	Bulgaria	9.100	9.266	18.366
16	Tamara Manina	Soviet Union	9.000	9.333	18.333
17	Keiko Tanaka-Ikeda	Japan	9.033	9.266	18.300
18	Georgeta Hurmuzachi	Romania	9.033	9.233	18.266
18	Lidiya Kalinina-Ivanova	Soviet Union	9.033	9.233	18.266
20	Matylda Matoušková-Šínová	Czechoslovakia	9.200	9.000	18.200
20	Dorota Horzonek-Jokiel	Poland	8.966	9.233	18.200
22	Mitsuka Ikeda	Japan	8.966	9.200	18.166
22	Sonia Iovan-Inovan	Romania	9.100	9.066	18.166
24	Lyudmila Yegorova	Soviet Union	8.833	9.300	18.133
24	Erzsébet Gulyás-Köteles	Hungary	9.000	9.133	18.133
26	Emilia Vătăşoiu-Liţă	Romania	8.966	9.133	18.100
27	Saltirka Spasova-Tarpova	Bulgaria	8.866	9.166	18.033
28	Miroslava Brdíčková	Czechoslovakia	8.966	9.033	18.000
29	Elena Mărgărit	Romania	8.833	9.100	17.933
29	Elena Săcălici	Romania	8.900	9.033	17.933
29	Alena Reichová	Czechoslovakia	8.900	9.033	17.933
32	Barbara Wilk-Ślizowska	Poland	8.833	9.066	17.900
33	Miranda Cicognani	Italy	8.900	8.966	17.866
33	Luciana Reali	Italy	8.766	9.100	17.866
35	Tsvetanka Stancheva	Bulgaria	8.733	9.033	17.766
35	Věra Drazdíková	Czechoslovakia	8.733	9.033	17.766
35	Danièle Sicot-Coulon	France	8.766	9.000	17.766
38	Eva Rönström	Sweden	8.700	9.000	17.700
38	Shizuko Sakashita	Japan	8.700	9.000	17.700
38	Elisa Calsi	Italy	8.700	9.000	17.700
41	Suzuko Seki	Japan	8.533	9.133	17.666
42	Kyoko Kubota	Japan	8.666	8.866	17.533
43	Rosella Cicognani	Italy	8.566	8.866	17.433
43	Elena Lagorara	Italy	8.533	8.900	17.433
45	Kazuko Sogabe	Japan	8.433	8.966	17.400
46	Evy Berggren	Sweden	8.533	8.800	17.333
46	Sandra Ruddick	United States	8.800	8.533	17.333
48	Lidia Szczerbińska	Poland	8.433	8.766	17.200
49	Doris Hedberg	Sweden	8.066	9.066	17.133
50	Ann-Sofi Pettersson-Colling	Sweden	8.333	8.766	17.100
50	Luciana Lagorara	Italy	8.433	8.666	17.100
52	Doris Fuchs	United States	8.500	8.500	17.000
52	Judy Howe	United States	8.500	8.500	17.000
54	Karin Lindberg	Sweden	8.100	8.700	16.800
55	Annette Krier	Luxembourg	8.200	8.400	16.600
56	Jackie Klein	United States	8.233	8.233	16.466
57	Joyce Racek	United States	8.266	8.033	16.300
58	Pat Hirst	Great Britain	8.100	8.166	16.266
59	Muriel Davis-Grossfeld	United States	8.533	7.700	16.233
60	Barbara Cunningham	Australia	7.933	8.233	16.166
61	Ernestine Russell-Carter	Canada	7.966	8.166	16.133
62	Maude Karlén	Sweden	7.966	7.766	15.733
63	Ing Fraser	Australia	8.000	7.633	15.633
64	Wendy Nicholls	Australia	6.866	7.966	14.833
65	Jacqueline Dieudonné	France	8.266	–	8.266
