= Gymnastics at the 1956 Summer Olympics – Women's vault =

Women's vault at the Games of the XVI Olympiad
- Venue: West Melbourne Stadium
- Date: 3–7 December 1956
- Competitors: 64 from 15 nations

Medalists
| 1st place, gold medalist(s) | | Larisa Latynina | Soviet Union |
| 2nd place, silver medalist(s) | | Tamara Manina | Soviet Union |
| 3rd place, bronze medalist(s) | | Olga Tass | Hungary |
| 3rd place, bronze medalist(s) | | Ann-Sofi Colling | Sweden |

These are the results of the women's vault competition, one of six events for female competitors in artistic gymnastics at the 1956 Summer Olympics in Melbourne.

== Competition format ==
The gymnastics format continued to use the aggregation format. Each nation entered either a team of six gymnasts or up to three individual gymnasts. All entrants in the gymnastics competitions performed both a compulsory exercise and a voluntary exercise for each apparatus. The 2 exercise scores were summed to give an apparatus total. No separate finals were contested.

Exercise scores ranged from 0 to 10 and apparatus scores from 0 to 20.

== Results ==
The results of the competition:

| Rank | Gymnast | Nation | Compulsory | Voluntary | Total |
|---|---|---|---|---|---|
| 1st place, gold medalist(s) | Larysa Latynina | Soviet Union | 9.433 | 9.400 | 18.833 |
| 2nd place, silver medalist(s) | Tamara Manina | Soviet Union | 9.466 | 9.333 | 18.800 |
| 3rd place, bronze medalist(s) | Olga Tass-Lemhényi | Hungary | 9.166 | 9.566 | 18.733 |
| 3rd place, bronze medalist(s) | Ann-Sofi Pettersson-Colling | Sweden | 9.433 | 9.300 | 18.733 |
| 5 | Sofia Muratova | Soviet Union | 9.500 | 9.166 | 18.666 |
| 6 | Elena Leușteanu | Romania | 9.266 | 9.366 | 18.633 |
| 7 | Helena Rakoczy | Poland | 9.233 | 9.266 | 18.500 |
| 7 | Natalia Kot | Poland | 9.333 | 9.166 | 18.500 |
| 9 | Lyudmila Yegorova | Soviet Union | 9.200 | 9.266 | 18.466 |
| 10 | Miranda Cicognani | Italy | 9.066 | 9.366 | 18.433 |
| 10 | Doris Hedberg | Sweden | 9.200 | 9.233 | 18.433 |
| 12 | Elena Lagorara | Italy | 8.933 | 9.366 | 18.300 |
| 13 | Andrea Bodó-Molnár | Hungary | 9.066 | 9.200 | 18.266 |
| 13 | Sonia Iovan-Inovan | Romania | 9.100 | 9.166 | 18.266 |
| 13 | Georgeta Hurmuzachi | Romania | 8.966 | 9.300 | 18.266 |
| 16 | Anna Marejková | Czechoslovakia | 9.133 | 9.100 | 18.233 |
| 16 | Margit Korondi | Hungary | 8.900 | 9.333 | 18.233 |
| 16 | Keiko Tanaka-Ikeda | Japan | 9.133 | 9.100 | 18.233 |
| 16 | Dorota Horzonek-Jokiel | Poland | 9.133 | 9.100 | 18.233 |
| 20 | Matylda Matoušková-Šínová | Czechoslovakia | 9.033 | 9.166 | 18.200 |
| 20 | Luciana Reali | Italy | 9.000 | 9.200 | 18.200 |
| 22 | Eva Bosáková-Věchtová | Czechoslovakia | 9.000 | 9.166 | 18.166 |
| 23 | Ágnes Keleti | Hungary | 8.833 | 9.300 | 18.133 |
| 23 | Elena Mărgărit | Romania | 8.933 | 9.200 | 18.133 |
| 23 | Kazuko Sogabe | Japan | 9.066 | 9.066 | 18.133 |
| 23 | Karin Lindberg | Sweden | 8.866 | 9.266 | 18.133 |
| 27 | Ivanka Dolzheva | Bulgaria | 8.900 | 9.200 | 18.100 |
| 27 | Elena Săcălici | Romania | 8.866 | 9.233 | 18.100 |
| 27 | Eva Rönström | Sweden | 8.900 | 9.200 | 18.100 |
| 30 | Emilia Vătăşoiu-Liţă | Romania | 8.900 | 9.166 | 18.066 |
| 30 | Mitsuka Ikeda | Japan | 9.133 | 8.933 | 18.066 |
| 32 | Rosella Cicognani | Italy | 8.733 | 9.300 | 18.033 |
| 32 | Maude Karlén | Sweden | 8.966 | 9.066 | 18.033 |
| 32 | Joyce Racek | United States | 8.900 | 9.133 | 18.033 |
| 35 | Saltirka Spasova-Tarpova | Bulgaria | 8.900 | 9.100 | 18.000 |
| 35 | Alena Reichová | Czechoslovakia | 9.000 | 9.000 | 18.000 |
| 35 | Doris Fuchs | United States | 8.966 | 9.033 | 18.000 |
| 38 | Evy Berggren | Sweden | 9.100 | 8.866 | 17.966 |
| 39 | Luciana Lagorara | Italy | 8.800 | 9.133 | 17.933 |
| 40 | Erzsébet Gulyás-Köteles | Hungary | 8.866 | 9.033 | 17.900 |
| 40 | Pat Hirst | Great Britain | 8.966 | 8.933 | 17.900 |
| 42 | Danuta Nowak-Stachow | Poland | 8.966 | 8.900 | 17.866 |
| 42 | Věra Drazdíková | Czechoslovakia | 9.000 | 8.866 | 17.866 |
| 42 | Suzuko Seki | Japan | 9.000 | 8.866 | 17.866 |
| 45 | Ernestine Russell-Carter | Canada | 9.000 | 8.833 | 17.833 |
| 46 | Tsvetanka Stancheva | Bulgaria | 8.933 | 8.866 | 17.800 |
| 46 | Sandra Ruddick | United States | 8.933 | 8.866 | 17.800 |
| 48 | Miroslava Brdíčková | Czechoslovakia | 8.866 | 8.866 | 17.333 |
| 48 | Lidia Szczerbińska | Poland | 9.033 | 8.700 | 17.733 |
| 50 | Polina Astakhova | Soviet Union | 8.733 | 8.833 | 17.566 |
| 50 | Kyoko Kubota | Japan | 8.733 | 8.833 | 17.566 |
| 50 | Barbara Wilk-Ślizowska | Poland | 8.833 | 8.733 | 17.566 |
| 53 | Elisa Calsi | Italy | 8.700 | 8.833 | 17.533 |
| 54 | Shizuko Sakashita | Japan | 8.800 | 8.700 | 17.500 |
| 55 | Danièle Sicot-Coulon | France | 8.400 | 9.000 | 17.400 |
| 56 | Lidiya Kalinina-Ivanova | Soviet Union | 9.200 | 8.133 | 17.333 |
| 57 | Jackie Klein | United States | 8.633 | 8.666 | 17.300 |
| 58 | Muriel Davis-Grossfeld | United States | 8.633 | 8.333 | 16.966 |
| 59 | Judy Howe | United States | 8.600 | 7.666 | 16.266 |
| 60 | Annette Krier | Luxembourg | 8.033 | 7.800 | 15.833 |
| 61 | Barbara Cunningham | Australia | 7.800 | 7.600 | 15.400 |
| 62 | Ing Fraser | Australia | 7.733 | 6.633 | 14.366 |
| 63 | Wendy Nicholls | Australia | 5.933 | 7.700 | 13.633 |
| 64 | Aliz Kertész | Hungary | 8.766 | – | 8.766 |
