= Gymnastics at the 1956 Summer Olympics – Women's balance beam =

Women's balance beam at the Games of the XVI Olympiad
- Venue: West Melbourne Stadium
- Date: 3–7 December 1956
- Competitors: 64 from 15 nations

Medalists
1st place, gold medalist(s)		Ágnes Keleti	Hungary
2nd place, silver medalist(s)		Eva Bosáková	Czechoslovakia
2nd place, silver medalist(s)		Tamara Manina	Soviet Union

These are the results of the women's balance beam competition, one of six events for female competitors in artistic gymnastics at the 1956 Summer Olympics in Melbourne.

== Competition format ==
The gymnastics format continued to use the aggregation format. Each nation entered either a team of six gymnasts or up to three individual gymnasts. All entrants in the gymnastics competitions performed both a compulsory exercise and a voluntary exercise for each apparatus. The 2 exercise scores were summed to give an apparatus total. No separate finals were contested.

Exercise scores ranged from 0 to 10 and apparatus scores from 0 to 20.

== Results ==
The results of the competition:

Rank	Gymnast	Nation	Compulsory	Voluntary	Total
1st place, gold medalist(s)	Ágnes Keleti	Hungary	9.433	9.366	18.800
2nd place, silver medalist(s)	Eva Bosáková-Věchtová	Czechoslovakia	9.300	9.333	18.633
2nd place, silver medalist(s)	Tamara Manina	Soviet Union	9.233	9.400	18.633
4	Larysa Latynina	Soviet Union	9.300	9.233	18.533
4	Anna Marejková	Czechoslovakia	9.300	9.233	18.533
6	Elena Leușteanu	Romania	9.300	9.200	18.500
7	Olga Tass-Lemhényi	Hungary	9.233	9.233	18.466
7	Margit Korondi	Hungary	9.266	9.200	18.466
7	Lyudmila Yegorova	Soviet Union	9.100	9.366	18.466
10	Sofia Muratova	Soviet Union	9.166	9.266	18.433
11	Sonia Iovan-Inovan	Romania	9.100	9.166	18.266
12	Emilia Vătăşoiu-Liţă	Romania	9.100	9.133	18.233
13	Natalia Kot	Poland	9.100	9.066	18.166
13	Polina Astakhova	Soviet Union	9.066	9.100	18.166
13	Kazuko Sogabe	Japan	9.066	9.100	18.166
16	Helena Rakoczy	Poland	9.033	9.100	18.133
16	Andrea Bodó-Molnár	Hungary	9.066	9.066	18.133
16	Shizuko Sakashita	Japan	8.966	9.166	18.133
19	Erzsébet Gulyás-Köteles	Hungary	9.066	9.033	18.100
20	Kyoko Kubota	Japan	8.966	9.100	18.066
21	Keiko Tanaka-Ikeda	Japan	9.266	8.733	18.000
21	Lidiya Kalinina-Ivanova	Soviet Union	8.900	9.100	18.000
23	Aliz Kertész	Hungary	9.300	8.666	17.966
24	Elisa Calsi	Italy	9.000	8.933	17.933
25	Danièle Sicot-Coulon	France	8.900	9.000	17.900
26	Ivanka Dolzheva	Bulgaria	8.800	9.066	17.866
26	Dorota Horzonek-Jokiel	Poland	8.833	9.033	17.866
28	Věra Drazdíková	Czechoslovakia	8.766	9.033	17.800
29	Georgeta Hurmuzachi	Romania	8.933	8.833	17.766
30	Elena Mărgărit	Romania	8.833	8.800	17.633
30	Lidia Szczerbińska	Poland	8.866	8.766	17.633
32	Muriel Davis-Grossfeld	United States	8.633	8.966	17.600
33	Danuta Nowak-Stachow	Poland	8.633	8.933	17.566
33	Miroslava Brdíčková	Czechoslovakia	8.800	8.766	17.566
33	Tsvetanka Stancheva	Bulgaria	8.366	9.200	17.566
36	Alena Reichová	Czechoslovakia	8.600	8.900	17.500
36	Suzuko Seki	Japan	9.100	8.400	17.500
38	Matylda Matoušková-Šínová	Czechoslovakia	8.566	8.900	17.466
39	Mitsuka Ikeda	Japan	9.033	8.400	17.433
39	Rosella Cicognani	Italy	8.566	8.866	17.433
41	Luciana Reali	Italy	8.700	8.700	17.400
41	Ann-Sofi Pettersson-Colling	Sweden	8.600	8.800	17.400
43	Barbara Wilk-Ślizowska	Poland	8.700	8.633	17.333
44	Elena Săcălici	Romania	8.966	8.333	17.300
44	Elena Lagorara	Italy	8.633	8.666	17.300
46	Karin Lindberg	Sweden	8.266	8.966	17.233
47	Miranda Cicognani	Italy	9.033	8.100	17.133
47	Luciana Lagorara	Italy	8.566	8.566	17.133
49	Jackie Klein	United States	8.366	8.733	17.100
50	Eva Rönström	Sweden	8.166	8.733	16.900
50	Maude Karlén	Sweden	8.033	8.866	16.900
52	Evy Berggren	Sweden	8.000	8.866	16.866
52	Judy Howe	United States	8.466	8.400	16.866
54	Saltirka Spasova-Tarpova	Bulgaria	8.700	8.133	16.833
55	Sandra Ruddick	United States	8.333	8.133	16.466
56	Doris Hedberg	Sweden	8.466	7.933	16.400
57	Wendy Nicholls	Australia	8.333	8.033	16.366
58	Joyce Racek	United States	8.600	7.733	16.333
59	Annette Krier	Luxembourg	7.433	8.533	15.966
60	Pat Hirst	Great Britain	7.733	8.166	15.900
61	Ernestine Russell-Carter	Canada	8.666	7.000	15.766
62	Ing Fraser	Australia	8.200	7.533	15.733
63	Doris Fuchs	United States	8.300	6.633	14.933
64	Barbara Cunningham	Australia	7.966	6.233	14.200
