= Gymnastics at the 1956 Summer Olympics – Women's artistic team all-around =

Women's artistic team all-around at the Games of the XVI Olympiad
- Venue: West Melbourne Stadium
- Date: 3–7 December 1956
- Competitors: 54 from 9 nations
- Winning score: 444.80

Medalists
1st place, gold medalist(s)		Polina Astakhova; Lyudmila Yegorova; Lidiya Ivanova; Larisa Latynina; Tamara Manina; Sofia Muratova	Soviet Union
2nd place, silver medalist(s)		Andrea Molnár-Bodó; Erzsébet Gulyás-Köteles; Ágnes Keleti; Alice Kertész; Margit Korondi; Olga Tass	Hungary
3rd place, bronze medalist(s)		Georgeta Hurmuzachi; Sonia Iovan; Elena Leușteanu; Elena Mărgărit; Elena Săcălici; Emilia Vătășoiu	Romania

The women's artistic team all-around competition at the 1956 Summer Olympics was held at the West Melbourne Stadium from 3 to 7 December. It was the fifth appearance of the event in the Olympics.

== Competition format ==
Each nation entered a team of six gymnasts (with up to two alternates). All entrants performed both a compulsory exercise and a voluntary exercise for each apparatus. The top five individual scores in each exercise (that is, compulsory floor, voluntary floor, compulsory vault, etc.) were added to give a team score for that exercise. The eight team exercise scores were summed, along with the team portable apparatus event score, to give a team total.

No separate finals were contested.

Exercise scores ranged from 0 to 10, apparatus scores from 0 to 20, individual totals from 0 to 80, team exercise scores from 0 to 50, portable apparatus scores from 0 to 80, and team total scores from 0 to 480.

== Results ==
The Soviet team won the gold medal, the Hungarian team won the silver, and the Romanian team won the bronze.

Rank	Nation	Gymnasts	Exercise results								Team portable apparatus	Team total
Rank	Nation	Gymnasts	Floor (gymnastics)		Balance beam		Parallel bars		Vault (gymnastics)		Team portable apparatus	Team total
Rank	Nation	Gymnasts	C	V	C	V	C	V	C	V	Team portable apparatus	Team total
1st place, gold medalist(s)	Soviet Union	Polina Astakhova	9.166	9.233	9.066	~~9.100~~	9.200	9.366	~~8.733~~	8.833	74.00	448.80
1st place, gold medalist(s)	Soviet Union	Lidiya Ivanova	9.266	~~9.166~~	~~8.900~~	9.100	9.033	~~9.233~~	9.200	~~8.133~~	74.00	448.80
1st place, gold medalist(s)	Soviet Union	Larisa Latynina	9.266	9.466	9.300	9.233	9.233	9.600	9.433	9.400	74.00	448.80
1st place, gold medalist(s)	Soviet Union	Tamara Manina	9.200	9.266	9.233	9.400	9.000	9.333	9.466	9.333	74.00	448.80
1st place, gold medalist(s)	Soviet Union	Sofia Muratova	9.300	9.266	9.166	9.266	9.300	9.500	9.500	9.166	74.00	448.80
1st place, gold medalist(s)	Soviet Union	Lyudmila Yegorova	~~9.000~~	9.466	9.100	9.366	~~8.833~~	9.300	9.200	9.266	74.00	448.80
1st place, gold medalist(s)	Soviet Union	Total	46.198	46.697	45.865	46.365	45.766	47.099	46.799	45.998	74.00	448.80
2nd place, silver medalist(s)	Hungary	Andrea Molnár-Bodó	9.166	~~8.933~~	9.066	9.066	9.233	9.166	9.066	9.200	75.20	443.50
2nd place, silver medalist(s)	Hungary	Erzsébet Gulyás-Köteles	~~8.966~~	9.100	~~9.066~~	9.033	9.000	~~9.133~~	8.866	9.033	75.20	443.50
2nd place, silver medalist(s)	Hungary	Ágnes Keleti	9.266	9.466	9.433	9.366	9.533	9.433	8.833	9.300	75.20	443.50
2nd place, silver medalist(s)	Hungary	Alice Kertész	9.066	8.966	9.300	~~8.666~~	9.333	9.300	~~8.766~~	–	75.20	443.50
2nd place, silver medalist(s)	Hungary	Margit Korondi	9.033	9.100	9.266	9.200	~~9.100~~	9.400	8.900	9.333	75.20	443.50
2nd place, silver medalist(s)	Hungary	Olga Tass	9.266	9.266	9.233	9.233	9.366	9.266	9.166	9.566	75.20	443.50
2nd place, silver medalist(s)	Hungary	Total	45.797	45.898	46.298	45.898	46.565	46.565	44.831	46.432	75.20	443.50
3rd place, bronze medalist(s)	Romania	Georgeta Hurmuzachi	9.266	9.166	8.933	8.833	9.033	9.233	8.966	9.300	73.40	438.20
3rd place, bronze medalist(s)	Romania	Sonia Iovan	9.133	9.066	9.100	9.166	9.100	9.066	9.100	9.166	73.40	438.20
3rd place, bronze medalist(s)	Romania	Elena Leușteanu	9.266	9.433	9.300	9.200	9.466	9.066	9.266	9.366	73.40	438.20
3rd place, bronze medalist(s)	Romania	Elena Mărgărit	9.166	9.166	~~8.833~~	8.800	~~8.833~~	9.100	8.933	9.200	73.40	438.20
3rd place, bronze medalist(s)	Romania	Elena Săcălici	9.066	9.033	8.966	~~8.333~~	8.900	~~9.033~~	~~8.866~~	9.233	73.40	438.20
3rd place, bronze medalist(s)	Romania	Emilia Vătășoiu	~~8.833~~	~~8.866~~	9.100	9.133	8.966	9.133	8.900	~~9.166~~	73.40	438.20
3rd place, bronze medalist(s)	Romania	Total	45.897	45.864	45.399	45.132	45.465	45.598	45.165	46.265	73.40	438.20
4	Poland	Dorota Horzonek-Jokiel	~~8.333~~	9.033	8.833	9.033	8.966	9.233	9.133	9.100	74.00	436.50
4	Poland	Natalia Kot	9.133	9.233	9.100	9.066	9.266	9.333	9.333	9.166	74.00	436.50
4	Poland	Danuta Nowak-Stachow	8.700	9.133	~~8.633~~	8.933	9.166	9.366	8.966	8.900	74.00	436.50
4	Poland	Helena Rakoczy	9.133	9.233	9.033	9.100	9.166	9.533	9.233	9.266	74.00	436.50
4	Poland	Lidia Szczerbińska	8.833	8.900	8.866	8.766	~~8.433~~	~~8.766~~	~~9.033~~	~~8.700~~	74.00	436.50
4	Poland	Barbara Wilk-Ślizowska	8.933	~~8.800~~	8.700	~~8.633~~	8.833	9.066	8.833	8.733	74.00	436.50
4	Poland	Total	44.732	45.532	44.532	44.898	45.397	46.531	45.698	45.165	74.00	436.50
5	Czechoslovakia	Eva Bosáková	9.233	9.333	9.300	9.333	9.400	9.333	9.000	9.166	73.00	435.356
5	Czechoslovakia	Miroslava Brdíčková	~~8.766~~	8.766	8.800	~~8.766~~	8.966	9.033	~~8.866~~	8.866	73.00	435.356
5	Czechoslovakia	Věra Drazdíková	9.033	8.866	8.766	9.033	~~8.733~~	9.033	9.000	~~8.866~~	73.00	435.356
5	Czechoslovakia	Anna Marejková	9.200	9.166	9.300	9.233	9.100	9.266	9.133	9.100	73.00	435.356
5	Czechoslovakia	Matylda Matoušková-Šínová	9.000	8.933	~~8.566~~	8.900	9.200	~~9.000~~	9.033	9.166	73.00	435.356
5	Czechoslovakia	Alena Reichová	8.933	~~8.500~~	8.600	8.900	8.900	9.033	9.000	9.000	73.00	435.356
5	Czechoslovakia	Total	45.399	45.064	44.766	45.399	45.566	45.698	45.166	45.298	73.00	435.356
6	Japan	Mitsuka Ikeda	9.100	9.133	9.033	8.400	8.966	9.200	9.133	8.933	73.20	433.653
6	Japan	Kyoko Kubota	~~8.900~~	9.066	8.966	9.100	8.666	~~8.866~~	~~8.733~~	8.833	73.20	433.653
6	Japan	Shizuko Sakashita	9.033	9.133	~~8.966~~	9.166	8.700	9.000	8.800	~~8.700~~	73.20	433.653
6	Japan	Suzuko Seki	8.966	~~9.000~~	9.100	~~8.400~~	8.533	9.133	9.000	8.866	73.20	433.653
6	Japan	Kazuko Sogabe	9.033	9.100	9.066	9.100	~~8.433~~	8.966	9.066	9.066	73.20	433.653
6	Japan	Keiko Tanaka-Ikeda	9.300	9.266	9.266	8.733	9.033	9.266	9.133	9.100	73.20	433.653
6	Japan	Total	45.432	45.698	45.431	44.499	43.898	45.565	45.132	44.798	73.20	433.653
7	Italy	Elisa Calsi	8.800	~~8.766~~	9.000	8.933	8.700	9.000	~~8.700~~	~~8.833~~	72.80	428.654
7	Italy	Miranda Cicognani	9.166	9.000	9.033	~~8.100~~	8.900	8.966	9.066	9.366	72.80	428.654
7	Italy	Rosella Cicognani	8.666	9.200	8.566	8.866	8.566	8.866	8.733	9.300	72.80	428.654
7	Italy	Elena Lagorara	8.633	9.033	8.633	8.666	8.533	8.900	8.933	9.366	72.80	428.654
7	Italy	Luciana Lagorara	8.700	8.833	~~8.566~~	8.566	~~8.433~~	~~8.666~~	8.800	9.133	72.80	428.654
7	Italy	Luciana Reali	~~8.500~~	8.966	8.700	8.700	8.766	9.100	9.000	9.200	72.80	428.654
7	Italy	Total	43.965	45.032	43.932	43.731	43.465	44.832	44.532	46.365	72.80	428.654
8	Sweden	Evy Berggren	~~8.966~~	~~8.833~~	~~8.000~~	8.866	8.533	8.800	9.100	~~8.866~~	74.20	428.60
8	Sweden	Doris Hedberg	9.266	9.233	8.466	~~7.933~~	8.066	9.066	9.200	9.233	74.20	428.60
8	Sweden	Maude Karlén	9.000	9.133	8.033	8.866	~~7.966~~	~~7.766~~	8.966	9.066	74.20	428.60
8	Sweden	Karin Lindberg	9.033	8.833	8.266	8.966	8.100	8.700	~~8.866~~	9.266	74.20	428.60
8	Sweden	Ann-Sofi Pettersson	9.066	9.100	8.600	8.800	8.333	8.766	9.433	9.300	74.20	428.60
8	Sweden	Eva Rönström	9.133	9.100	8.166	8.733	8.700	9.000	8.900	9.200	74.20	428.60
8	Sweden	Total	45.498	45.399	41.531	44.231	41.732	44.332	45.599	46.065	74.20	428.60
9	United States	Muriel Davis-Grossfeld	9.100	9.033	8.633	8.966	8.533	~~7.700~~	8.633	8.333	67.60	413.20
9	United States	Doris Fuchs	8.966	8.833	~~8.300~~	~~6.633~~	8.500	8.500	8.966	9.033	67.60	413.20
9	United States	Judy Howe	~~8.733~~	~~8.333~~	8.466	8.400	8.500	8.500	~~8.600~~	~~7.666~~	67.60	413.20
9	United States	Jackie Klein	8.900	8.533	8.366	8.733	~~8.233~~	8.233	8.633	8.666	67.60	413.20
9	United States	Joyce Racek	8.766	9.066	8.600	7.733	8.266	8.033	8.900	9.133	67.60	413.20
9	United States	Sandra Ruddick	9.100	8.433	8.333	8.133	8.800	8.533	8.933	8.866	67.60	413.20
9	United States	Total	44.832	43.898	42.398	41.965	42.599	41.799	44.065	44.031	67.60	413.20
