= Gymnastics at the 1956 Summer Olympics – Women's team portable apparatus =

Women's team portable apparatus at the Games of the XVI Olympiad
- Venue: West Melbourne Stadium
- Date: 3–7 December 1956
- Competitors: 54 from 9 nations

Medalists
1st place, gold medalist(s)		Andrea Molnár-Bodó; Erzsébet Gulyás-Köteles; Ágnes Keleti; Alice Kertesz; Margit Korondi; Olga Tass	Hungary
2nd place, silver medalist(s)		Karin Lindberg; Ann-Sofi Pettersson; Eva Rönström; Evy Berggren; Doris Hedberg; Maud Karlén	Sweden
3rd place, bronze medalist(s)		Polina Astakhova; Ludmila Egorova; Lidia Kalinina; Larisa Latynina; Tamara Manina; Sofia Muratova	Soviet Union
3rd place, bronze medalist(s)		Helena Rakoczy; Natalia Kot; Danuta Nowak-Stachow; Dorota Horzonek-Jokiel; Barbara Wilk-Ślizowska; Lidia Szczerbińska	Poland

The women's team portable apparatus competition was one of the events of the artistic gymnastics discipline contested in the 1956 Summer Olympics in Melbourne. The portable apparatus would eventually be removed from the Women's Artistic Gymnastics competition.

From the official Report of the 1956 Summer Olympics:

Probably the most popular and spectacular item was the women's gymnastics team exercises with portable apparatus and music. It was a spectacle of controlled rhythm and concerted movement that has never been seen in Australia before. Hungary was the noteworthy winner, but public acclaim calls for mention of Sweden (second) and Rumania, with their exciting and unforgettable music and costumes.

The event would be the foundation for rhythmic gymnastics, which would debut at the 1984 Summer Olympics in Los Angeles.

== Apparatus ==
Each team had to perform with an apparatus. The following were used in the 1956 competition. The scores would be added to the final team score.

- Ball
- Ribbon
- Hoop
- Clubs
- Rope

== Results ==
Rank	Nation	Gymnasts	Apparatus	Score
1st place, gold medalist(s)	Hungary	Andrea Molnár-Bodó; Erzsébet Gulyás-Köteles; Ágnes Keleti; Alice Kertesz; Margit Korondi; Olga Tass	Ribbon	75.200
2nd place, silver medalist(s)	Sweden	Karin Lindberg; Ann-Sofi Pettersson; Eva Rönström; Evy Berggren; Doris Hedberg; Maud Karlén	Ball	74.200
3rd place, bronze medalist(s)	Soviet Union	Polina Astakhova; Ludmila Egorova; Lidia Kalinina; Larisa Latynina; Tamara Manina; Sofia Muratova		74.000
3rd place, bronze medalist(s)	Poland	Helena Rakoczy; Natalia Kot; Danuta Nowak-Stachow; Dorota Horzonek-Jokiel; Barbara Wilk-Ślizowska; Lidia Szczerbińska	Hoop	74.000
5	Romania	Georgeta Hurmuzachi; Sonia Iovan; Elena Leuşteanu; Elena Mărgărit; Elena Săcălici; Emilia Vătăşoiu		73.400
6	Japan	Keiko Tanaka-Ikeda; Mitsuka Ikeda; Kazuko Sogabe; Shizuko Sakashita; Kyoko Kubota; Suzuko Seki		73.200
7	Czechoslovakia	Eva Bosáková; Anna Marejková; Matylda Matoušková-Šínová; Věra Drazdíková; Alena Reichová; Miroslava Brdíčková		73.000
8	Italy	Miranda Cicognani; Luciana Reali; Rosella Cicognani; Elisa Calsi; Elena Lagorara; Luciana Lagorara		72.800
9	United States	Sandra Ruddick; Muriel Davis-Grossfeld; Joyce Racek; Jacquelyn Klein; Doris Fuchs; Judy Howe		67.600
