= Soviet Union women's national artistic gymnastics team =

National sports team

Soviet Union
- Continental union: European Union of Gymnastics

Olympic Games
- Appearances: 9
- Medals: Gold: 1952, 1956, 1960, 1964, 1968, 1972, 1976, 1980, 1988

World Championships
- Appearances: 14
- Medals: Gold: 1954, 1958, 1962, 1970, 1974, 1978, 1981, 1983, 1985, 1989, 1991; Silver: 1966, 1979, 1987

The Soviet Union women's national artistic gymnastics team represented the Soviet Union in FIG international competitions. They were the dominant force in the sport from the 1950s until the Soviet Union's collapse. They lead the medal tally for women's artistic gymnastics with 88 medals including 33 gold. Larisa Latynina is also the most decorated female athlete at the Olympic games with a total of 18 medals. Soviet dominance was unprecedented in scale and longevity and was likely the result of the country's heavy investment in mass and elite sports to fulfill its political agenda.

== History ==
The Soviet Union won the team gold medal at the 1952 Summer Olympics – the first Olympics that the Soviet Union participated in, and they won the team gold for the next seven games. The winning streak was interrupted by the boycott of the 1984 Summer Olympics, but they won gold at the 1988 Summer Olympics – the last Olympics that the Soviet Union participated in. The Unified Team won the team gold at the 1992 Summer Olympics. The Soviet Union won team gold at every World Championships that they competed in (1954–1991) except 1966, 1979, and 1987 where they won silver.

== Team competition results ==
=== Olympic Games ===
- 1952 — gold medal
  Nina Bocharova, Pelageya Danilova, Maria Gorokhovskaya, Medea Jugeli, Ekaterina Kalinchuk, Galina Minaicheva, Galina Shamrai, Galina Urbanovich
- 1956 — gold medal
  Polina Astakhova, Lidiya Ivanova, Larisa Latynina, Tamara Manina, Sofia Muratova, Lyudmila Yegorova
- 1960 — gold medal
  Polina Astakhova, Lidiya Ivanova, Larisa Latynina, Sofia Muratova, Margarita Nikolaeva, Tamara Zamotaylova
- 1964 — gold medal
  Polina Astakhova, Lyudmila Gromova, Larisa Latynina, Tamara Manina, Yelena Volchetskaya, Tamara Zamotaylova
- 1968 — gold medal
  Lyubov Burda, Olga Karasyova, Natalia Kuchinskaya, Larisa Petrik, Ludmilla Tourischeva, Zinaida Voronina
- 1972 — gold medal
  Lyubov Burda, Olga Korbut, Antonina Koshel, Tamara Lazakovich, Elvira Saadi, Ludmilla Tourischeva
- 1976 — gold medal
  Maria Filatova, Svetlana Grozdova, Nellie Kim, Olga Korbut, Elvira Saadi, Ludmilla Tourischeva
- 1980 — gold medal
  Yelena Davydova, Maria Filatova, Nellie Kim, Yelena Naimushina, Natalia Shaposhnikova, Stella Zakharova
- 1984 — did not participate due to boycott
- 1988 — gold medal
  Svetlana Baitova, Svetlana Boginskaya, Natalia Lashchenova, Yelena Shevchenko, Yelena Shushunova, Olga Strazheva
- 1992 — gold medal – participated as the Unified Team
  Svetlana Boginskaya, Oksana Chusovitina, Rozalia Galiyeva, Elena Grudneva, Tatiana Gutsu, Tatiana Lysenko

=== World Championships ===
- 1934 — did not participate
- 1938 — did not participate
- 1950 — did not participate
- 1954 — gold medal
  Nina Bocharova, Pelageya Danilova, Maria Gorokhovskaya, Larisa Diriy, Tamara Manina, Sofia Muratova, Galina Rud'ko, Galina Sarabidze
- 1958 — gold medal
  Polina Astakhova, Raisa Borisova, Lidiya Kalinina, Larisa Latynina, Tamara Manina, Sofia Muratova
- 1962 — gold medal
  Polina Astakhova, Lidiya Ivanova, Larisa Latynina, Tamara Manina, Sofia Muratova, Irina Pervuschina
- 1966 — silver medal
  Polina Astakhova, Zinaida Druzhinina, Olga Karaseva, Natalia Kuchinskaya, Larisa Latynina, Larisa Petrik
- 1970 — gold medal
  Lyubov Burda, Olga Karaseva, Tamara Lazakovich, Larisa Petrik, Ludmilla Tourischeva, Zinaida Voronina
- 1974 — gold medal
  Nina Dronova, Nellie Kim, Olga Korbut, Elvira Saadi, Rusudan Sikharulidze, Ludmilla Tourischeva
- 1978 — gold medal
  Svetlana Agapova, Tatiana Arzhannikova, Maria Filatova, Nellie Kim, Elena Mukhina, Natalia Shaposhnikova
- 1979 — silver medal
  Maria Filatova, Nellie Kim, Elena Naimushina, Natalia Shaposhnikova, Natalia Tereschenko, Stella Zakharova
- 1981 — gold medal
  Olga Bicherova, Elena Davydova, Maria Filatova, Natalia Ilienko, Elena Polevaya, Stella Zakharova
- 1983 — gold medal
  Olga Bicherova, Tatiana Frolova, Natalia Ilienko, Olga Mostepanova, Albina Shishova, Natalia Yurchenko
- 1985 — gold medal
  Irina Baraksanova, Vera Kolesnikova, Olga Mostepanova, Oksana Omelianchik, Yelena Shushunova, Natalia Yurchenko
- 1987 — silver medal
  Svetlana Baitova, Svetlana Boginskaya, Elena Gurova, Oksana Omelianchik, Yelena Shushunova, Tatiana Tuzhikova
- 1989 — gold medal
  Svetlana Baitova, Svetlana Boginskaya, Olesia Dudnik, Natalia Laschenova, Elena Sazonenkova, Olga Strazheva
- 1991 — gold medal
  Svetlana Boginskaya, Oksana Chusovitina, Rozalia Galiyeva, Tatiana Gutsu, Natalia Kalinina, Tatiana Lysenko

== Most decorated gymnasts ==
This list includes all Soviet female artistic gymnasts who have won at least four medals at the Olympic Games and the World Artistic Gymnastics Championships combined. This list does include medals won as the Unified Team at the Olympics and the Commonwealth of Independent States in 1992 but does not includes medals won under the flag of an independent nation after the dissolution of the Soviet Union. Also not included are medals won at the 1984 Friendship Games (alternative Olympics).

Additionally medals won in the Team Portable Apparatus at the 1952 or 1956 Olympic Games are located under the Team column and are designated with an asterisk (*).

Rank	Gymnast	Years	Team	AA	VT	UB	BB	FX	Olympic Total	World Total	Total
1	Larisa Latynina	1954–1966	1956; 1960; 1964; 1956*; 1954; 1958; 1962; 1966	1956; 1960; 1964; 1958; 1962	1956; 1964; 1960; 1958; 1962	1956; 1960; 1964; 1958; 1962	1964; 1960; 1958; 1962	1956; 1960; 1964; 1962; 1958	18	14	32
2	Ludmilla Tourischeva	1968–1976	1968; 1972; 1976; 1970; 1974	1972; 1976; 1970; 1974	1976; 1972; 1974; 1970	1970; 1974	1974	1972; 1976; 1970; 1974	9	11	20
3	Nellie Kim	1974–1979	1976; 1980; 1974; 1978; 1979	1976; 1979; 1978	1976; 1978; 1979		1979; 1974	1976; 1980; 1978; 1979	6	11	17
4	Yelena Shushunova	1985–1988	1988; 1985; 1987	1988; 1985; 1987	1985; 1987	1988; 1987	1988; 1987; 1985	1987; 1985	4	11	15
5	Svetlana Boginskaya	1987–1992	1988; 1992; 1989; 1991; 1987	1988; 1989; 1991	1988; 1992		1991; 1987	1988; 1989	5	9	14
6	Tamara Manina	1954–1964	1956; 1964; 1956*; 1954; 1958; 1962	1958	1956; 1954; 1958; 1962		1956; 1964	1954	6	8	14
7	Polina Astakhova	1956–1964	1956; 1960; 1964; 1956*; 1958; 1962; 1966	1960; 1964		1960; 1964; 1958		1960; 1964	10	4	14
8	Sofia Muratova	1954–1962	1956; 1960; 1956*; 1954; 1958; 1962	1960; 1956	1960; 1958	1956	1960; 1958		8	5	13
9	Olga Korbut	1972–1976	1972; 1976; 1974	1974	1974	1972; 1974	1972; 1976; 1974	1972; 1974	5	7	12
10	Natalia Kuchinskaya	1966–1968	1968; 1966	1968; 1966	1966	1966	1968; 1966	1968; 1966	4	6	10
11	Zinaida Voronina	1966–1970	1968; 1970; 1966	1968; 1970	1968	1968; 1966; 1970		1970	4	6	10
12	Maria Gorokhovskaya	1952–1954	1952; 1952*; 1954	1952	1952	1952	1952	1952; 1954	7	2	9
13	Maria Filatova	1976–1981	1976; 1980; 1978; 1981; 1979	1981		1980			3	4	7
14	Tatiana Gutsu	1991–1992	1992; 1991	1992		1992; 1991	1991	1992	4	3	7
15	Yelena Davydova	1980–1981	1980; 1981	1980; 1981		1981	1980	1981	3	4	7
16	Larisa Petrik	1966–1970	1968; 1970; 1966				1968; 1966; 1970	1968	3	4	7
16	Natalia Shaposhnikova	1978–1980	1980; 1978; 1979	1978	1980		1980	1980	4	3	7
18	Lidiya Ivanova	1956–1962	1956; 1960; 1956*; 1958; 1962		1958				3	3	6
19	Nina Bocharova	1952–1954	1952; 1952*; 1954	1952			1952		4	1	5
19	Olga Mostepanova	1983–1985	1983; 1985	1983			1983	1983	0	5	5
19	Elena Mukhina	1978	1978	1978		1978	1978	1978	0	5	5
19	Galina Shamrai	1952–1954	1952; 1952*; 1954	1954		1954			2	3	5
23	Oksana Chusovitina	1991–1992	1992; 1991		1991; 1992			1991	1	4	5
24	Tatiana Lysenko	1991–1992	1992; 1991		1992		1992	1992	3	2	5
25	Stella Zakharova	1979–1981	1980; 1981; 1979		1979; 1981				1	4	5
26	Tamara Lazakovich	1970–1972	1972; 1970	1972			1972	1972	4	1	5
27	Oksana Omelianchik	1985–1987	1985	1985	1987			1985	0	4	4
28	Lyubov Burda	1968–1970	1968; 1972; 1970		1970				2	2	4
29	Olga Karasyova	1966–1970	1968; 1970; 1966					1970	2	2	4
30	Galina Minaicheva	1952–1954	1952; 1952*; 1954		1952				3	1	4
30	Irina Pervushina	1962	1962	1962		1962		1962	0	4	4
32	Olga Strazheva	1988–1989	1988; 1989	1989		1989			1	3	4
32	Tamara Zamotaylova	1960–1964	1960; 1964			1960		1960	4	0	4

== See also ==
- Russia women's national gymnastics team
- List of Olympic female artistic gymnasts for the Soviet Union
- Soviet Union men's national artistic gymnastics team
