= Czechoslovakia women's national artistic gymnastics team =

National sports team

Czechoslovakia
- Continental union: European Union of Gymnastics

Olympic Games
- Appearances: 11
- Medals: Gold: 1948; Silver: 1936, 1960, 1964, 1968; Bronze: 1952

World Championships
- Medals: Gold: 1934, 1938, 1966; Silver: 1958, 1962; Bronze: 1954, 1970

The Czechoslovakia women's national artistic gymnastics team represented Czechoslovakia in FIG international competitions.

== History ==
Czechoslovakia made its Olympic debut in 1936. In 1984, it joined the Soviet Union in boycotting the Olympic Games. In 1992, Czechoslovakia split into two separate nations: the Czech Republic and Slovakia.

== Team competition results ==
=== Olympic Games ===
- 1936 – Silver medal
  Jaroslava Bajerová, Vlasta Děkanová, Božena Dobešová, Vlasta Foltová, Anna Hřebřinová, Matylda Pálfyová, Zdeňka Veřmiřovská, Marie Větrovská
- 1948 – Gold medal
  Zdeňka Honsová, Marie Kovářová, Miloslava Misáková, Milena Müllerová, Věra Růžičková, Olga Šilhánová, Božena Srncová, Zdeňka Veřmiřovská
- 1952 – Bronze medal
  Hana Bobková, Alena Chadimová, Jana Rabasová, Alena Reichová, Matylda Matoušková-Šínová, Božena Srncová, Věra Vančurová, Eva Věchtová
- 1956 – 5th place
  Eva Bosáková, Miroslava Brdíčková, Věra Drazdíková, Anna Marejková, Matylda Matoušková-Šínová, Alena Reichová
- 1960 – Silver medal
  Eva Bosáková, Věra Čáslavská, Matylda Matoušková-Šínová, Hana Růžičková, Ludmila Švédová, Adolfína Tkačíková
- 1964 – Silver medal

- Věra Čáslavská, Marianna Némethová-Krajčírová, Jana Posnerová, Hana Růžičková, Jaroslava Sedláčková, Adolfína Tkačíková

- 1968 – Silver medal
  Věra Čáslavská, Marianna Némethová-Krajčírová, Jana Kubičková, Hana Lišková, Bohumila Řimnáčová, Miroslava Skleničková
- 1972 – 5th place
  Marianna Némethová-Krajčírová, Zdena Dorňáková, Soňa Brázdová, Zdena Bujnáčková, Hana Lišková, Marcela Váchová
- 1976 – 5th place
  Anna Pohludková, Ingrid Holkovičová, Jana Knopová, Drahomíra Smolíková, Eva Pořádková, Alena Černáková
- 1980 – 4th place
  Eva Marečková, Radka Zemanová, Jana Labáková, Katarína Šarišská, Dana Brýdlová, Anita Šauerová
- 1984 – did not participate due to boycott
- 1988 – 7th place
  Iveta Poloková, Hana Říčná, Alena Dřevjaná, Ivona Krmelová, Martina Velíšková, Jana Vejrková

=== World Championships ===
- 1934 – gold medal
  Maria Bajerová, Vlasta Děkanová, Vlasta Foltová, Eleonora Hajková, Vlasta Jarusková, Zdeňka Veřmiřovská
- 1938 – gold medal
  Vlasta Děkanová, Božena Dobešová, Marie Hendrychová, Anna Nezerpová, Matylda Pálfyová, Marie Skálová, Zdeňka Veřmiřovská
- 1954 – bronze medal
  Eva Bosáková, Miroslava Brdíčková, Alena Chadimová, Věra Drazdíková, Zdena Liškova, Anna Marejková, Alena Reichová, Věra Vančurová
- 1958 – silver medal
  Eva Bosáková, Věra Čáslavská, Anna Marejková, Matylda Matoušková-Šínová, Ludmila Švédová, Adolfína Tkačíková
- 1962 – silver medal
  Eva Bosáková, Věra Čáslavská, Libuše Cmíralová, Hana Růžičková, Ludmila Švédová, Adolfína Tkačíková
- 1966 – gold medal
  Věra Čáslavská, Jaroslava Sedláčková, Marianna Némethová-Krajčírová, Jana Kubičková, Bohumila Řimnáčová, Jindra Košťálová
- 1970 – bronze medal
  Soňa Brázdová, Ľubica Krásna, Hana Lišková, Marianna Némethová-Krajčírová, Bohumila Řimnáčová, Marcela Váchová
- 1974 – 5th place
  Zdena Dorňáková, Jana Knopová, Drahomíra Smolíková, Václava Soukupová, Zdena Bujnáčková, Božena Perdykulová
- 1979 – 5th place
  Věra Černá, Eva Marečková, Radka Zemanová, Katarína Šarišská, Anita Šauerová, Lenka Chatarová
- 1981 – 5th place
  Jana Labáková, Eva Marečková, Martina Polcrová, Jana Gajdošová, Jana Rulfová, Katarína Šarišská

== Most decorated gymnasts ==
This list includes all Czechoslovak female artistic gymnasts who have won at least four medals at the Olympic Games and the World Artistic Gymnastics Championships combined. Not included are medals won at the 1984 Friendship Games (alternative Olympics).

| Rank | Gymnast | Team | AA | VT | UB | BB | FX | Olympic Total | World Total | Total |
|---|---|---|---|---|---|---|---|---|---|---|
| 1 | Věra Čáslavská | 1960; 1964; 1968; 1966; 1958; 1962 | 1964; 1968; 1966; 1962 | 1964; 1968; 1962; 1966 | 1968 | 1964; 1968; 1966 | 1968; 1966; 1962 | 11 | 10 | 21 |
| 2 | Eva Bosáková | 1960; 1952; 1958; 1962; 1954 | 1954; 1958 | | 1958; 1962 | 1960; 1956; 1962; 1954 | 1958; 1954 | 4 | 11 | 15 |
| 3 | Vlasta Děkanová | 1936; 1934; 1938 | 1934; 1938 | 1938 | 1938 | 1938 | | 1 | 7 | 8 |
| 4 | Matylda Pálfyová | 1936; 1938 | 1938 | 1938 | | | 1938 | 1 | 4 | 5 |
| 5 | Zdeňka Veřmiřovská | 1948; 1936; 1938 | 1938 | | | | | 2 | 2 | 4 |
| 6 | Marianna Némethová-Krajčírová | 1964; 1968; 1966; 1970 | | | | | | 2 | 2 | 4 |
