= Cicognani =

Cicognani is an Italian surname that may refer to

- Amleto Giovanni Cicognani (1883–1973), Italian cardinal
- Gaetano Cicognani (1881–1962), Italian cardinal, brother of Amleto
- Miranda Cicognani (1936–2025), Italian gymnast
- Rosella Cicognani (born 1939), Italian gymnast, sister of Miranda
