= Lagorara =

Lagorara is an Italian surname. Notable people with the surname include:

- Elena Lagorara (1939–2003), Italian Olympic gymnast
- Luciana Lagorara (1936–2023), Italian Olympic gymnast, sister of Elena
