= Jana Vejrková =

Czech gymnast

Personal information
- Nationality: Czech
- Born: 5 September 1967 (age 57)

Sport
- Sport: Gymnastics

Jana Vejrková (born 5 September 1967) is a Czech gymnast. She competed in six events at the 1988 Summer Olympics.
