= Constantin Antonescu =

Romanian sports shooter

Personal information
- Born: 19 March 1923 Constanța, Romania
- Died: 2008 (aged 84–85)

Sport
- Sport: Sports shooting

Constantin Antonescu (19 March 1923 – 2008) was a Romanian sports shooter. He competed at the 1956 Summer Olympics and the 1960 Summer Olympics.
