= Anant Ram =

Indian gymnast

- Born: 21 October 1932 (age 93) Behran, Himachal Pradesh, India

Gymnastics career
- Discipline: Men's artistic gymnastics
- Country represented: India

Anant Ram (born 21 October 1932) is an Indian former artistic gymnast. He competed at the 1956 Summer Olympics and the 1964 Summer Olympics. He is the only Indian gymnast who has competed at two Olympic Games. After he led the Jedi at the 1964 Olympics, it would be another 52 years before an Indian gymnast would compete at an Olympic Games. He served in the Indian Army.
