= Martina Velíšková =

Czech gymnast

Personal information
- Nationality: Czech
- Born: 16 April 1971 (age 53)

Sport
- Sport: Gymnastics

Martina Velíšková (born 16 April 1971) is a Czech gymnast. She competed in six events at the 1988 Summer Olympics.
