= Romania at the 1956 Summer Olympics =

- IOC code: ROU
- NOC: Romanian Olympic Committee

in Melbourne/Stockholm
- Competitors: 44 (33 men and 11 women) in 10 sports
- Flag bearer: Iosif Sîrbu
- Medals Ranked 9th: Gold 5 Silver 3 Bronze 5 Total 13

Summer Olympics appearances (overview)
- 1900; 1904–1920; 1924; 1928; 1932; 1936; 1948; 1952; 1956; 1960; 1964; 1968; 1972; 1976; 1980; 1984; 1988; 1992; 1996; 2000; 2004; 2008; 2012; 2016; 2020; 2024

Romania competed at the 1956 Summer Olympics in Melbourne, Australia and Stockholm, Sweden (equestrian events). 44 competitors, 33 men and 11 women, took part in 35 events in 10 sports.

== Medalists ==
Medal	Name	Sport	Event	Date
Gold				
Gold				
Gold				
Gold				
Gold				
Silver				
Silver				
Silver				
Bronze				
Bronze				
Bronze				
Bronze				
Bronze				

Medals by sport
Sport	1st place, gold medalist(s)	2nd place, silver medalist(s)	3rd place, bronze medalist(s)	Total
Boxing				
Canoeing				
Fencing				
Gymnastics				
Shooting				
Wrestling				
Total	5	3	5	13

Medals by gender
Gender	1st place, gold medalist(s)	2nd place, silver medalist(s)	3rd place, bronze medalist(s)	Total
Male				
Female				
Total	5	3	5	13

=== Gold ===
- Nicolae Linca — Boxing, Men's Welterweight
- Leon Rotman — Canoeing, Men's C1 1.000m Canadian Singles
- Leon Rotman — Canoeing, Men's C1 10.000m Canadian Singles
- Alexe Dumitru and Simion Ismailciuc — Canoeing, Men's C2 1.000m Canadian Pairs
- Ștefan Petrescu — Shooting, Men's Rapid-Fire Pistol

=== Silver ===
- Mircea Dobrescu — Boxing, Men's Flyweight
- Gheorghe Negrea — Boxing, Men's Light Heavyweight
- Olga Orban-Szabo — Fencing, Women's Foil Individual

=== Bronze ===
- Constantin Dumitrescu — Boxing, Men's Light Welterweight
- Elena Leuşteanu — Gymnastics, Women's Floor Exercises
- Gheorghe Lichiardopol — Shooting, Men's Rapid-Fire Pistol
- Francisc Horvat — Wrestling, Men's Greco-Roman Bantamweight
- Elena Leuşteanu, Georgeta Hurmuzachi, Sonia Iovan, Emilia Vătăşoiu-Liţă, Elena Mărgărit-Niculescu, and Elena Săcălici — Gymnastics, Women's Team Combined Exercises

== Fencing ==
Two fencers, both women, represented Romania in 1956.

Women's foil

- Olga Orban-Szabo
- Ecaterina Orb-Lazăr

== Modern pentathlon ==
Three male pentathletes represented Romania in 1956.

Individual

- Cornel Vena
- Dumitru Țintea
- Victor Teodorescu

Team

- Cornel Vena
- Dumitru Ţintea
- Victor Teodorescu

== Shooting ==
Four shooters represented Romania in 1956. In the 25 m pistol event Ștefan Petrescu won gold and Gheorghe Lichiardopol won bronze.

25 m pistol

- Ștefan Petrescu
- Gheorghe Lichiardopol

300 m rifle, three positions

- Constantin Antonescu

50 m rifle, three positions

- Iosif Sîrbu
- Constantin Antonescu

50 m rifle, prone

- Iosif Sîrbu
- Constantin Antonescu

== Swimming ==
Men

Athlete	Event	Heat		Final	
Athlete	Event	Time	Rank	Time	Rank
Alexandru Popescu	200 m butterfly	2:29.9	8 Q	2:31.0	8

Women

Athlete	Event	Heat		Final	
Athlete	Event	Time	Rank	Time	Rank
Maria Both	100 m backstroke	1:15.8	12	Did not advance	
