= Annette Krier =

Luxembourgish gymnast (born 1937)

Personal information
- Nationality: Luxembourgish
- Born: 10 August 1937 (age 87); Luxembourg, Luxembourg

Sport
- Sport: Gymnastics

Annette Krier (born 10 August 1937) is a Luxembourgish gymnast. She competed in five events at the 1956 Summer Olympics.
