= Barbara Cunningham =

Australian gymnast (1926–2022)

Personal information
- Nationality: Australian
- Born: 28 July 1926; Adelaide, Australia
- Died: 23 August 2022 (aged 96); Melbourne, Australia

Sport
- Sport: Gymnastics

Barbara Cunningham (28 July 1926 – 23 August 2022) was an Australian gymnast. She competed in five events at the 1956 Summer Olympics.

Cunningham died in Melbourne on 23 August 2022, at the age of 96.
