= Ing Fraser =

Australian gymnast

Personal information
- Birth name: Ingeborg Haussler
- Nationality: Australian
- Born: 1928; Baden-Württemberg, Germany
- Died: 15 November 1957 (aged 28–29); Brisbane, Australia

Sport
- Sport: Gymnastics

Ing Fraser (1928 – 15 November 1957) was an Australian gymnast. She competed in five events at the 1956 Summer Olympics.

Fraser died of leukaemia in 1957.
