= Wendy Nicholls =

Australian gymnast (born 1937)

Personal information
- Nationality: Australian
- Born: 22 May 1937 (age 88)

Sport
- Sport: Gymnastics

Wendy Nicholls (born 22 May 1937) is an Australian gymnast. She competed in five events at the 1956 Summer Olympics.
