= Saltirka Spasova-Tarpova =

Bulgarian gymnast (born 1933)

Personal information
- Nationality: Bulgarian
- Born: 22 July 1933 (age 92) Gulyantsi, Bulgaria

Sport
- Sport: Gymnastics

Saltirka Spasova-Tarpova (born 22 July 1933) is a Bulgarian gymnast. She competed at the 1952 Summer Olympics, the 1956 Summer Olympics and the 1960 Summer Olympics.

== See also ==
- List of female artistic gymnasts with the most appearances at Olympic Games
