= Danièle Sicot-Coulon =

French gymnast (1935–2026)

Personal information
- Nationality: French
- Born: 24 March 1935 Châteaudun, France
- Died: 3 March 2026 (aged 90) Murat, Cantal, France

Sport
- Sport: Gymnastics

Danièle Sicot-Coulon (French: [danjɛl siko kulɔ̃]; 24 March 1935 – 3 March 2026) was a French gymnast. She competed at the 1956 Summer Olympics and the 1960 Summer Olympics. Sicot-Coulon died in Murat, Cantal on 3 March 2026, at the age of 90.
