= Pat Hirst =

British gymnast (1918–1996)

Personal information
- Nationality: British
- Born: 18 November 1918
- Died: January 1996 Leeds, England

Sport
- Sport: Gymnastics

Pat Hirst (18 November 1918 – January 1996) was a British gymnast. She competed at the 1948 Summer Olympics, the 1952 Summer Olympics and the 1956 Summer Olympics.
