= Evy Berggren =

Swedish gymnast (1934–2018)

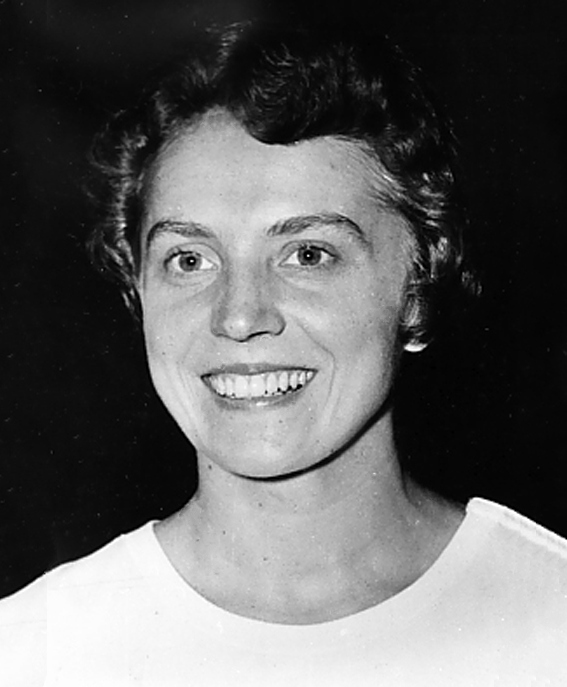
- Berggren in the 1950s

Personal information
- Full name: Evy Margareta Berggren (Westerberg)
- Born: 16 June 1934 Skellefteå, Sweden
- Died: 5 December 2018 (aged 84) Uppsala, Sweden

Gymnastics career
- Discipline: Women's artistic gymnastics
- Country represented: Sweden (1950–c. 1956)
- Club: Skellefteå Gymnastikförening, Gefle Gymnastikförening
Medal record
Women's artistic gymnastics
Representing Sweden
Olympic Games
Gold medal – first place	1952 Helsinki	Team portable apparatus
Silver medal – second place	1956 Melbourne	Team portable apparatus
World Championships
Gold medal – first place	1950 Basel	Team all-around
Gold medal – first place	1950 Basel	Team portable apparatus
Bronze medal – third place	1954 Rome	Vault

Evy Margareta Westerberg (née Berggren; 16 June 1934 – 5 December 2018) was a Swedish gymnast. She was a two-time Olympic medalist and three-time World Championship medalist during the 1950s.

== Career ==
Berggren made her debut with the Swedish national team at the 1950 World Artistic Gymnastics Championships in Basel, Switzerland. She had to apply for dispensation to participate in the world championships, as she had only recently turned sixteen at the time of competition and was considered underage for the Swedish squad. With the Swedish team, Berggren won gold in the women's team exercise with portable apparatus, an event that laid the foundation for modern rhythmic gymnastics, and in the women's team all-around – she placed fourth in the individual all-around.

At the 1952 Summer Olympics in Helsinki, Berggren won a gold medal in the team exercise with portable apparatus. Sweden placed fourth in the team all-around and Berggren was 36th in the individual all-around.

Berggren's best result in an individual event was earned at the 1954 World Artistic Gymnastics Championships in Rome, where she won bronze on vault. She finished 0.030 points behind her compatriot Ann-Sofi Pettersson and the Soviet Union's Tamara Manina, who tied for gold.

At the 1956 Summer Olympics in Melbourne, Berggren was part of the Swedish silver medal-winning team that participated in team portable apparatus.
