= Shizuko Sakashita =

Japanese gymnast

Personal information
- Nationality: Japanese
- Born: 8 December 1933
- Died: 17 May 1972 (aged 38) Toyama, Japan

Sport
- Sport: Gymnastics

Shizuko Sakashita (Japanese: 坂下 千津子, 8 December 1933 – 17 May 1972) was a Japanese gymnast. She competed in seven events at the 1956 Summer Olympics.

Sakashita died in 1972 at the age of 38; the cause of death with suicide.
