= Mitsuka Ikeda =

Japanese gymnast

Personal information
- Nationality: Japanese
- Born: 15 September 1932 (age 92)

Sport
- Sport: Gymnastics

Mitsuka Ikeda (born 15 September 1932) is a Japanese gymnast. She competed in seven events at the 1956 Summer Olympics.
