= Kyoko Kubota =

Japanese gymnast

Personal information
- Nationality: Japanese
- Born: 2 January 1933 (age 92)

Sport
- Sport: Gymnastics

Kyoko Kubota (久保田 恭子, Kubota Kyōko, born 2 January 1933) is a Japanese gymnast. She competed in seven events at the 1956 Summer Olympics.
