= Suzuko Seki =

Japanese gymnast

Suzuko Shintani
Personal information
- Native name: 新谷 鈴子
- Nationality: Japanese
- Born: Suzuko Seki (関 鈴子); 18 February 1936 (age 90)
- Education: Northwestern State University

Sport
- Sport: Gymnastics

Suzuko Shintani (新谷 鈴子, Shintani Suzuko; born 18 February 1936), nee Suzuko Seki (関 鈴子, Seki Suzuko), is a Japanese gymnast. She competed in seven events at the 1956 Summer Olympics, and wrote an article entitled Deep Emotions from the Hinomaru, describing her thoughts on Japanese identity represented by the waving of Japanese flags at the Olympics just a few short years after the end of the Second World War.

Shintani was due to participate in the 1960 Summer Olympics in Rome for the Japanese contingent, but was prevented from doing so by a herniated disc that caused paralysis in her right leg. Instead, she went on to study in the United States, graduating with a master's degree from Northwestern State University.

In 1962, Shintani worked as an assistant to gymnast Joanne Giannini (nee Pasquale). In 1970, she published a book entitled the Basics of Women's Gymnastics (女子体操競技の基礎).
