= Doris Fuchs =

American gymnast (born 1938)

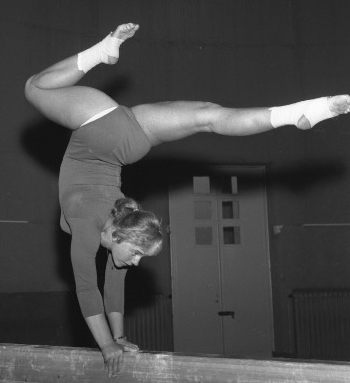
- Fuchs at the 1960 Olympics

Personal information
- Full name: Doris Gudrun Fuchs
- Born: June 11, 1938 (age 88) Villingen im Schwarzwald, Baden-Württemberg, Germany
- Height: 152 cm (5 ft 0 in)

Gymnastics career
- Discipline: Women's artistic gymnastics
- Club: Rochester Catholic Youth Organization
Medal record
Women's artistic gymnastics
Representing the United States
Pan American Games
Gold medal – first place	1963 São Paulo	Team all-around
Gold medal – first place	1963 São Paulo	Ind. all-around
Gold medal – first place	1963 São Paulo	Balance beam
Gold medal – first place	1963 São Paulo	Uneven bars

Doris Gudrun Fuchs (later Brause, born June 11, 1938) is a retired American gymnast who won four gold medals at the 1963 Pan American Games.

== Biography ==
Doris Fuchs was born in Villingen im Schwarzwald, Baden-Württemberg in 1938. She and her family came to the United States in 1951 when she was 12, living in Greece, New York near Rochester.

Fuchs competed in all artistic gymnastics events at the 1956 and 1960 Summer Olympics and finished ninth with the American team three times: all-around in both games and in the team portable apparatus in 1956. Her best individual result was eighth place on uneven bars in 1960. Fuchs attended the 1963 Pan American Games in São Paulo, and earned three individual gold medals there as well as a fourth gold medal from the USA winning the women's team competition. Fuchs attended the 1964 Olympics as a reserve. This attracted minor controversy, as the coach trusted one of his own gymnasts to be put on the main team over Fuchs despite Fuchs having higher scores in qualifying. At the 1966 World Artistic Gymnastics Championships in West Germany, Fuchs performed a well-regarded and innovative uneven bars event. While the crowd approved, she received low scores from the judges and did not medal. In 1982 she was inducted into the U.S. Gymnastics Hall of Fame.

Besides gymnastics, Fuchs trained in the javelin throw and triple jump. Her sister Inge was also an international gymnast. At the 1960 Olympics Fuchs became friends with the Soviet boxer Boris Nikonorov. She visited Nikonorov's family in 1963, when the U.S. gymnastics team had a competition in Moscow and had a long correspondence by mail, exchanging gifts and love letters, which was intercepted and suppressed by the KGB. Soviet authorities threatened Nikonorov with repercussions if he did not stop communicating with Fuchs, and after a long struggle, he was forced to oblige. Fuchs would eventually marry her coach instead, Eckhard Brause.
