= Elisa Calsi =

Italian gymnast

Personal information
- Nationality: Italian
- Born: 6 March 1937 (age 88); Lodi, Italy

Sport
- Sport: Gymnastics

Elisa Calsi (born 6 March 1937) is an Italian former gymnast. She competed in seven events at the 1956 Summer Olympics.
