= Muriel Grossfeld =

American gymnast (1940–2021)

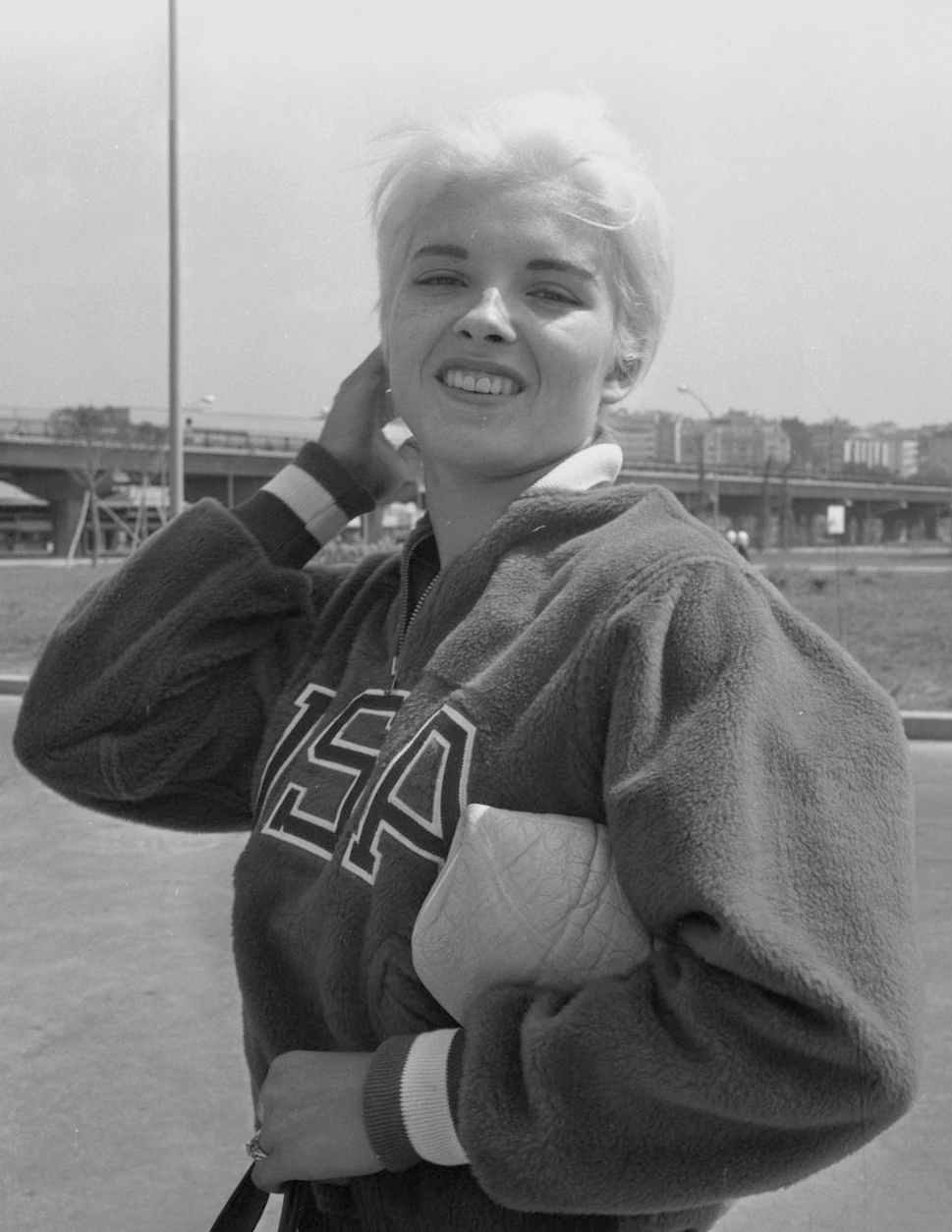
- Muriel Grossfeld at the 1960 Olympics

Personal information
- Born: October 7, 1940 New York City, United States
- Died: January 17, 2021 (aged 80)
- Height: 160 cm (5 ft 3 in)
- Weight: 50 kg (110 lb)

Sport
- Sport: Artistic gymnastics
- Club: Southern Connecticut Gym Club
Medal record
Representing United States
Pan American Games
Gold medal – first place	1963 São Paulo	Team all-around

Muriel Evelyn Grossfeld (née Davis; October 7, 1940 – January 17, 2021) was an American gymnast who won a team gold medal at the 1963 Pan American Games. She competed in all artistic gymnastics events at the 1956, 1960, and 1964 Olympics and finished ninth with the American team four times: all-around in all three games and in the team portable apparatus in 1956. Her best individual result was 19th place in the floor exercise in 1960.

In 1959 Muriel Davis was signed to star in a TV series, El Coyote, the adventures of an athletic "girl Zorro". Ken Murray produced a half-hour pilot for RKO Television; Murray co-directed the film with former stunt master Richard Talmadge. The series was to co-star screen veterans George Brent and Billy Gilbert. The pilot didn't sell but, as one trade journal reported, ABC-TV "is keeping Miss Davis on the payroll at $25,000, just in case. Miss Davis is spending the year improving her mind at the University of Illinois."

Grossfeld was married to the fellow Olympic gymnast Abie Grossfeld, but they later divorced. After retiring from competitions she had a long career as a national gymnastics coach and international referee. In 1981 she was inducted into the U.S. Gymnastics Hall of Fame.

She appeared on the TV program To Tell the Truth on March 15, 1965, and performed a routine on a balance beam.
