= Joyce Racek =

American artistic gymnast (1938–2001)

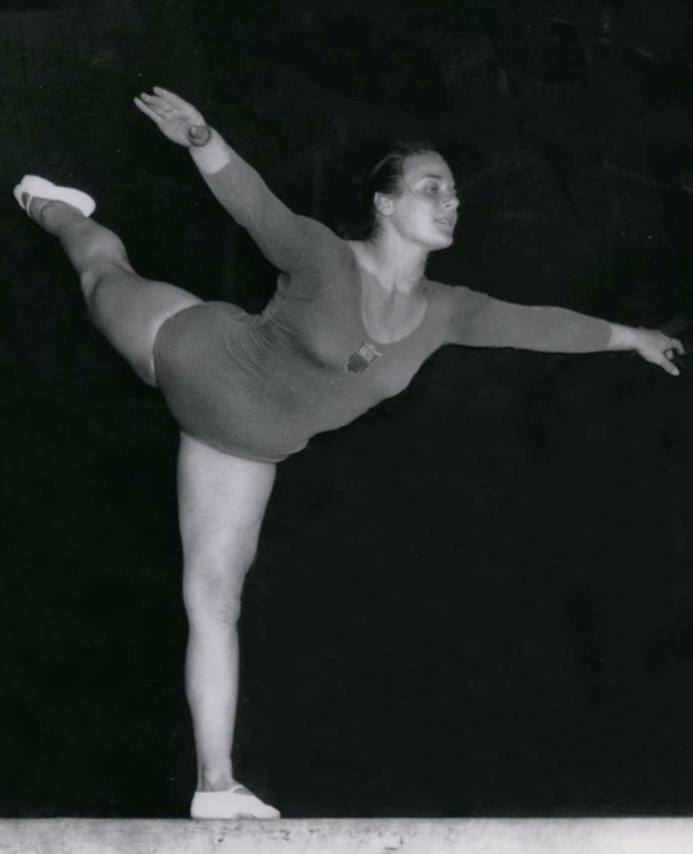
- Racek in 1956

Personal information
- Born: August 16, 1938 West Point, Wisconsin, U.S.
- Died: August 4, 2001 (aged 62) Littleton, Colorado, U.S.
- Height: 160 cm (5 ft 3 in)
- Weight: 61 kg (134 lb)

Sport
- Sport: Artistic gymnastics
- Club: Lincoln Turners
- Coached by: Erna Wachtel

Joyce May Racek (later Markley, later Budrunas, August 16, 1938 – August 4, 2001) was an American artistic gymnast. She competed at the 1956 Summer Olympics with the best individual result of 42nd place in the floor exercise.

Racek took up gymnastics aged four. The family moved to Chicago, IL in 1941. In 1956 she graduated from Lake View High School and then studied at a college in Michigan. She then moved to Sarasota Florida with her first husband Bill Markley, but they later divorced. Her first three children remained with her in the divorce, and her newborn daughter was adopted. In the early 1970s Racek lived in Australia with her first three children and her second husband Paul Budrunas. Later she moved back to the US to Littleton, Colorado, where Racek and Budrunas ended their marriage.

Racek died of lung cancer.
