= Anna Marejková =

Slovak gymnast (born 1933)

Personal information
- Full name: Anna Marejková-Krausová
- Nationality: Slovak
- Born: 24 October 1933 (age 91); Turzovka, Czechoslovakia

Sport
- Country: Czechoslovakia
- Sport: Gymnastics

Anna Marejková (married name Krausová, born 24 October 1933) is a Slovak gymnast. She competed for Czechoslovakia in seven events at the 1956 Summer Olympics.
