= Věra Drazdíková =

Czech gymnast (born 1933)

Personal information
- Nationality: Czech
- Born: 1 February 1933 (age 92); Prague, Czechoslovakia
- Died: 1983

Sport
- Sport: Gymnastics

Věra Drazdíková (1 February 1933 – 1983) was a Czech gymnast. She competed in seven events at the 1956 Summer Olympics.
