= Jackie Klein =

American gymnast

- Klein in 1956

Personal information
- Full name: Jacquelyn Joyce Klein
- Born: July 11, 1937 (age 88) Chicago, Illinois, U.S.
- Height: 164 cm (5 ft 5 in)
- Weight: 56 kg (123 lb)

Sport
- Sport: Artistic gymnastics
- Club: Lincoln Turners
- Coached by: Erna Wachtel

Jacquelyn Joyce "Jackie" Klein (later Fie, born July 11, 1937) is a retired American artistic gymnast, coach, referee and official. She competed at the 1956 Summer Olympics with the best individual result of 49th place in the balance beam.

Klein retired soon after the Olympics due to a back injury. In 1959, she earned a Bachelor of Science degree from Northwestern University, and then had a long career as a physical education teacher, gymnastics coach, judge and administrator. Since the 1970s, she was a member of the International Federation of Gymnastics and was named its honorary vice-president upon her retirement in 2004. Within the Federation she served as vice-president of the Women's Technical Committee (WTC) in 1984–1992, and in 1992 became the first American WTC president. In 1979, Klein was inducted into the U.S. Gymnastics Hall of Fame and, in 2014, into the International Gymnastics Hall of Fame.

Klein is married to Larry Fie; they have two sons.
