= Eva Rönström =

Swedish gymnast (1932–2021)

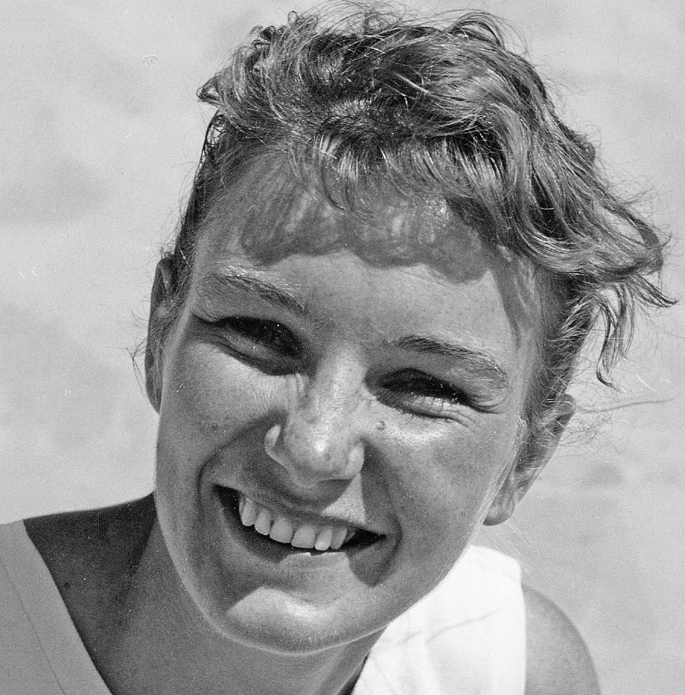
- Rönström in 1950s

Personal information
- Born: 29 December 1932 Stockholm, Sweden
- Died: 7 October 2021 (aged 88)

Sport
- Sport: Gymnastics
- Club: SSIF, Stockholm
Medal record
Representing Sweden
Olympic Games
Silver medal – second place	1956 Melbourne	Team portable apparatus

Eva Rönström (later Ericsson or Eriksson, 29 December 1932 – 7 October 2021) was a Swedish gymnast. She won a silver medal in the team portable apparatus event at the 1956 Summer Olympics. Rönstrom died on 7 October 2021, at the age of 88.
