= Maude Karlén =

Swedish gymnast

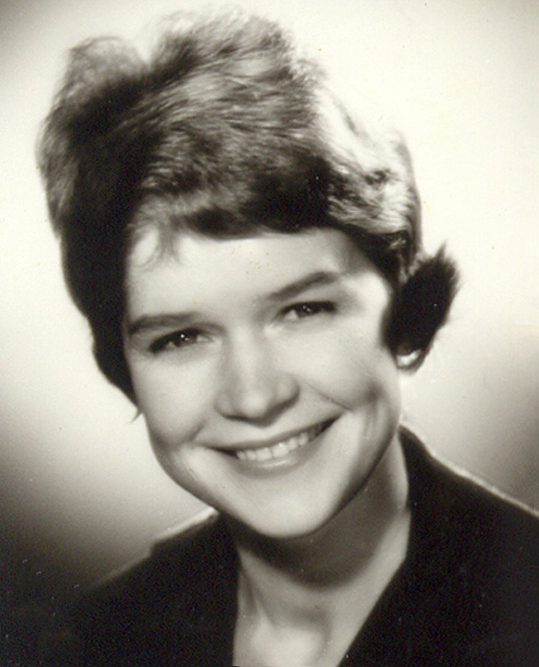

Personal information
- Born: 25 November 1932 (age 93) Stockholm, Sweden

Sport
- Sport: Gymnastics
- Club: GK Hermes, Stockholm
Medal record
Representing Sweden
Olympic Games
Silver medal – second place	1956 Melbourne	Team portable apparatus

Maude Astrid Karlén (born 25 November 1932) is a retired Swedish gymnast. She won a silver medal in the team portable apparatus event at the 1956 Summer Olympics.
