= Doris Hedberg =

Swedish gymnast (born 1936)

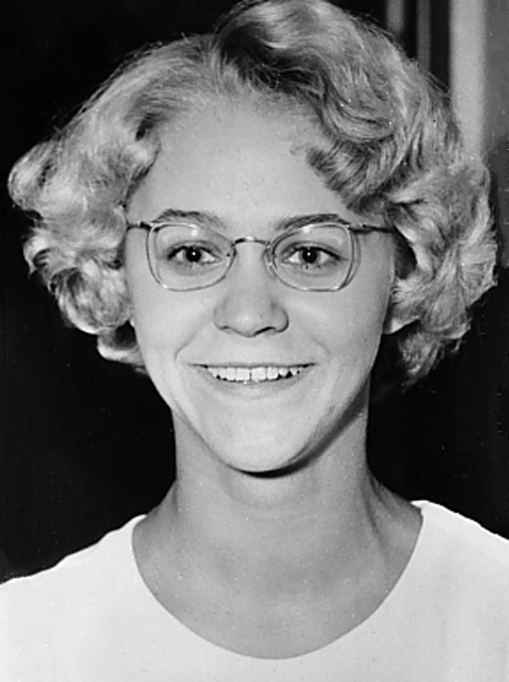

Personal information
- Born: 18 February 1936 (age 90) Skellefteå, Sweden

Sport
- Sport: Gymnastics
- Club: Skellefteå GF
Medal record
Representing Sweden
Olympic Games
Silver medal – second place	1956 Melbourne	Team portable apparatus

Doris Linnea Birgitta Hedberg (later Asplund; born 18 February 1936) is a retired Swedish gymnast. She won a silver medal in the team portable apparatus event at the 1956 Summer Olympics.
