= Sandra Ruddick =

American gymnast (1932–2017)

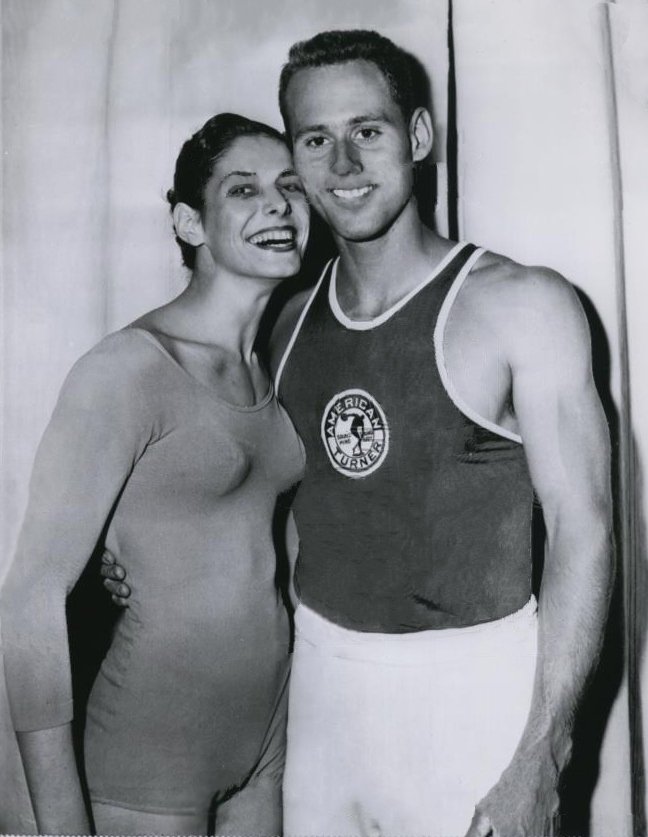
- Ruddick (left) in 1956

Personal information
- Born: September 3, 1932 Indianapolis, U.S.
- Died: October 10, 2017 (aged 85)
- Height: 176 cm (5 ft 9 in)
- Weight: 59 kg (130 lb)

Sport
- Sport: Artistic gymnastics
- Club: Athenaeum Turners
- Coached by: Erna Wachtel

Sandra Marlene Ruddick (née Anderson; September 3, 1932 – October 10, 2017) was an American artistic gymnast. She competed at the 1956 Summer Olympics with the best individual result of 46th place on the vault and uneven bars. She was married to Robert Ruddick Jr and had three children: Dave Ruddick, Kathi Ruddick-Waite, and Robert Ruddick. She later married Al John, with whom she had a son, Leo and a daughter, MaryAnn. In 2012 she was inducted into the Indiana Gymnastics Hall of Fame.
