= Miroslava Brdíčková =

Czech gymnast

Personal information
- Nationality: Czech
- Born: 4 September 1927; Litomyšl, Czechoslovakia
- Died: 19 September 1957 (aged 30)

Sport
- Sport: Gymnastics

Miroslava Brdíčková (4 September 1927 – 19 September 1957) was a Czech gymnast. She competed in seven events at the 1956 Summer Olympics.
