= Luciana Reali =

Italian gymnast

Personal information
- Nationality: Italian
- Born: 4 March 1936; Venice, Italy
- Died: 4 April 1981 (aged 45); Padua, Italy

Sport
- Sport: Gymnastics

Luciana Reali (4 March 1936 – 4 April 1981) was an Italian gymnast. She competed at the 1952 Summer Olympics and the 1956 Summer Olympics.
