= Kazuko Sogabe =

Japanese gymnast

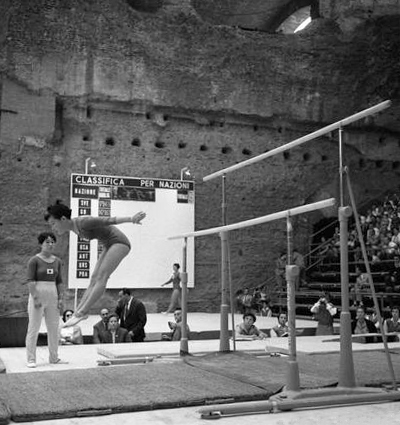
- Sogabe at the 1960 Olympics

Personal information
- Born: March 27, 1936 (age 90) Kanagawa Prefecture, Japan
- Height: 151 cm (4 ft 11 in)
- Weight: 48 kg (106 lb)

Sport
- Sport: Artistic gymnastics

Kazuko Sogabe (曽我部 和子, Sogabe Kazuko; born March 27, 1936) is a retired Japanese gymnast. She competed in all artistic gymnastics events at the 1956 and 1960 Summer Olympics and finished sixth and fourth with her teams, respectively. Her best individual result was 13th place in the floor exercise in 1960.
