= Judy Howe =

American gymnast

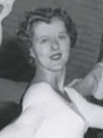
- Howe in 1956

Personal information
- Born: June 25, 1935 (age 91) Indianapolis, U.S.
- Height: 162 cm (5 ft 4 in)
- Weight: 55 kg (121 lb)

Sport
- Sport: Artistic gymnastics
- Club: Rochester Central Turners
- Coached by: Erna Wachtel

Judith Ann "Judy" Howe (later Hult, born June 25, 1935) is a retired American artistic gymnast. She competed at the 1956 Summer Olympics with the best individual result of 52nd place on the balance beam and uneven bars. In 1976 she was inducted into the Beaver County Sports Hall of Fame.
