= Elena Mărgărit =

Romanian artistic gymnast

Elena Mărgărit-Niculescu
- Full name: Elena Margarit-Mărgărit (-Dobrovolschi, -Fodor)
- Born: 25 October 1936 (age 89) Timișoara, Romania

Gymnastics career
- Discipline: Women's artistic gymnastics
- Country represented: Romania
Medal record
Olympic Games
Bronze medal – third place	1956 Melbourne	Team
Bronze medal – third place	1960 Rome	Team
World Championships
Bronze medal – third place	1958 Moscow	Team

Elena Mărgărit-Niculescu (also -Dobrovolschi and -Fodor, born 25 October 1936 in Timișoara) is a retired Romanian artistic gymnast who represented Romania at the 1956 Olympic Games and at the 1960 Olympic Games. She is a double Olympic bronze medalist and a world bronze medalist with the team.
