= Luciana Lagorara =

Italian gymnast (1936–2023)

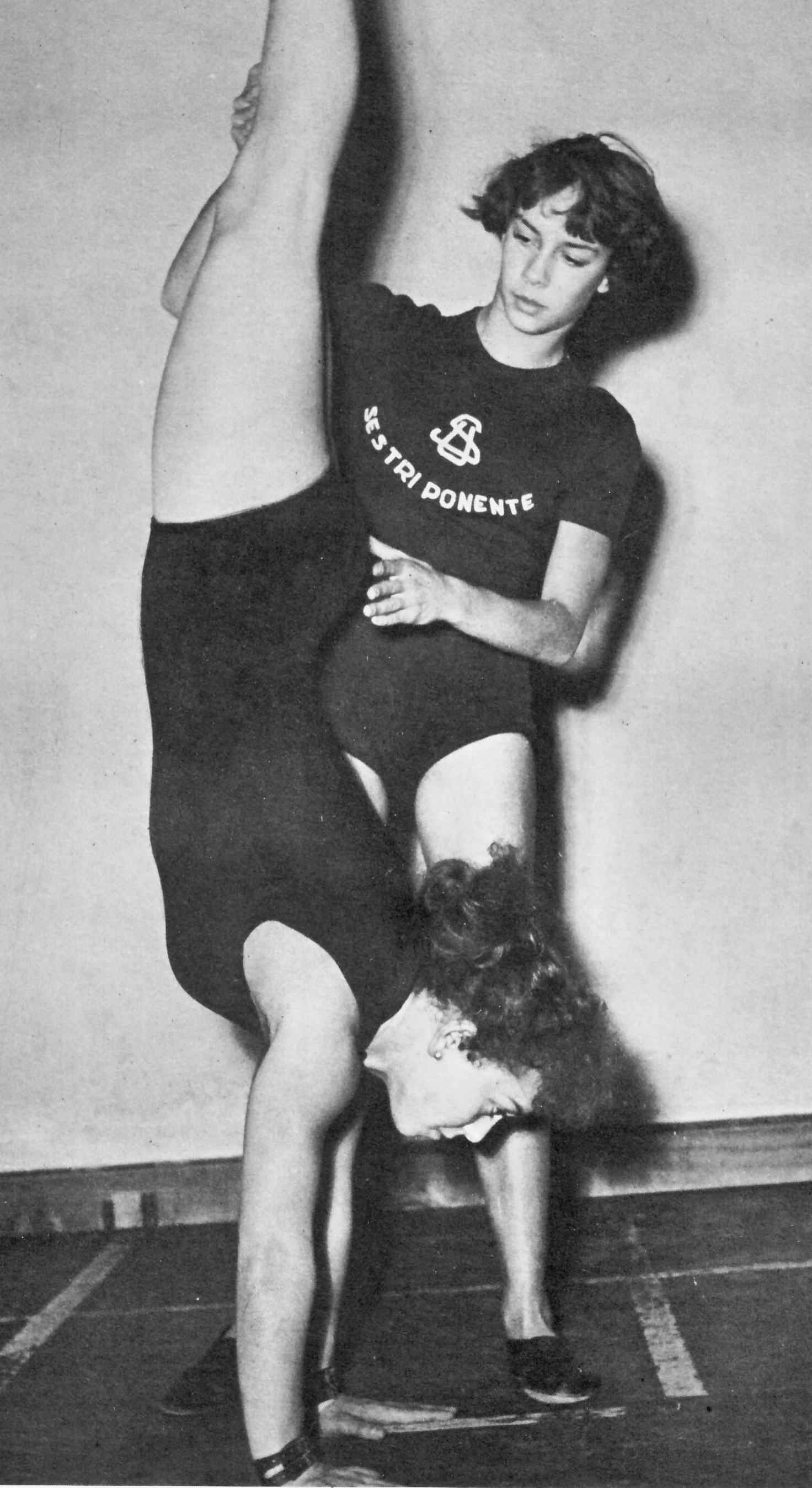
- Luciana and Elena Lagorara in 1956

Personal information
- Born: 25 November 1936 Sestri Ponente, Italy
- Died: 4 June 2023 (aged 86) Genoa, Italy

Sport
- Sport: Artistic gymnastics
- Club: US Sestri Ponente

Luciana Lagorara (25 November 1936 – 4 June 2023) was an Italian gymnast. Together with her younger sister Elena she competed in all artistic gymnastics events at the 1956 Summer Olympics with the best individual result of 39th place on the vault.
