= Rosella Cicognani =

Italian gymnast

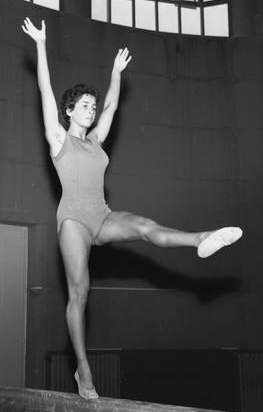
- Rosella Cicognani at the 1960 Olympics

Personal information
- Nationality: Italian
- Born: 1 October 1939 (age 85); Forlì, Italy
- Height: 1.58 m (5 ft 2 in)
- Weight: 49 kg (108 lb)

Sport
- Country: Italy
- Sport: Gymnastics

Rosella Cicognani (born 1 October 1939) is a retired Italian gymnast. Together with her elder sister Miranda she competed in the 1956 and 1960 Summer Olympics with the best individual result of 16th place on uneven bars in 1960.
