= Lyudmila Yegorova =

Russian artistic gymnast

Personal information
- Born: 24 February 1931 Lomonosov, Russian SFSR, Soviet Union
- Died: 21 May 2009 (aged 78) Kaliningrad, Russia

Sport
- Sport: Artistic gymnastics
- Club: SKA Leningrad
Medal record
Representing the Soviet Union
Olympic Games
Gold medal – first place	1956 Melbourne	Team allround
Bronze medal – third place	1956 Melbourne	Team portable apparatus

Lyudmila Borisovna Yegorova (Russian: Людмила Борисовна Егорова; 24 February 1931 – 21 May 2009) was a Russian artistic gymnast. She competed at the 1956 Summer Olympics, finishing within top 10 in all artistic gymnastics events, except for uneven bars. She won a team all-around gold medal and a bronze medal in the now-defunct team portable apparatus exercise.

She won four national titles in acrobatics in 1950–1953, and was a runner up in the vault and all-around in 1955 and 1956. She later graduated from the Institute of Physical Education in Saint Petersburg and worked as a gymnastics coach. At the time of her death she headed the Kaliningrad branch of Russian Athletes' Union.
