= Miranda Cicognani =

Italian gymnast (1936–2025)

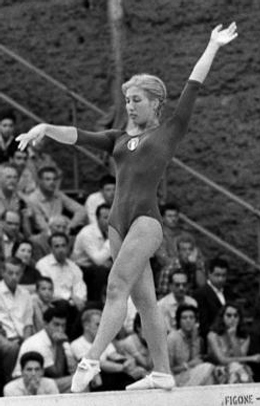
- Miranda Cicognani at the 1960 Olympics

Personal information
- Nationality: Italian
- Born: 12 September 1936; Forlì, Italy
- Died: 28 January 2025 (aged 88); Forlì, Italy
- Height: 1.55 m (5 ft 1 in)
- Weight: 51 kg (112 lb)

Sport
- Country: Italy
- Sport: Gymnastics

Miranda Cicognani (12 September 1936 – 28 January 2025) was an Italian gymnast. At the opening ceremony of the 1952 Summer Olympics she became the first Italian woman to bear the Olympic flag of Italy. She took part in the 1952, 1956, and 1960 Games with the best result of sixth place in the team all-around event in 1952. Her younger sister Rosella competed alongside in 1956 and 1960.

Cicognani died in Forlì on 28 January 2025, at the age of 88.

== See also ==
- List of flag bearers for Italy at the Olympics
- List of Olympic female gymnasts for Italy

Summer Olympics
Preceded by Gianni Rocca	Flag bearer for Italy; 1952 Helsinki	Succeeded by Edoardo Mangiarotti
