= Lidiya Ivanova (gymnast) =

Russian gymnast and referee

Personal information
- Born: 27 January 1937 (age 89) Moscow, Russian SFSR, Soviet Union
- Height: 1.64 m (5 ft 5 in)
- Weight: 57 kg (126 lb)

Sport
- Sport: Artistic gymnastics
- Club: Neftyanik, Dynamo Moscow, Burevestnik Moscow
Medal record
Representing Soviet Union
Olympic Games
Gold medal – first place	1956 Melbourne	Team all-round
Gold medal – first place	1960 Rome	Team all-round
Bronze medal – third place	1956 Melbourne	Team portable apparatus
World Championships
Gold medal – first place	1962 Prague	Team all-round
Gold medal – first place	1958 Moscow	Team all-round
Silver medal – second place	1958 Moscow	Vault

Lidiya Gavrilovna Ivanova (née Kalinina; Russian: Лидия Гавриловна Иванова (Калинина); born 27 January 1937) is a retired Russian artistic gymnast and international referee. She competed at the 1956 and 1960 Summer Olympics in all artistic gymnastics events. In 1956, she won a team all-around gold medal and a bronze medal in the now-defunct team portable apparatus exercise. In 1960, she finished within the first eight in all events, earning her second gold medal in the team all-around competition.

She was the all-around Soviet champion in 1958 and the world champion in the team all-around in 1958 and 1962; she also won a silver medal in the vault at the 1958 World Artistic Gymnastics Championships. She retired from competition in 1964 due to injury. In 1973, she graduated from the Moscow Institute of Physical Education with a degree of coach. She started working before the graduation, heading the junior national team between 1970 and 1980. Between 1982 and 1992, she assisted with the senior national team and was its head coach at the 1992 Summer Olympics. In 1970, she became an international referee, and was selected as a judge at all Olympics between 1972 and 1992, as well as world championships and other international competitions in between. After 1992, she worked as a sports commentator and later as the head of the women's national team. In 2023, saying she is a "child of the Great Patriotic War", Ivanova confirmed she would never allow her gymnasts to compete at the Olympic Games under a neutral flag, as had been proposed by the International Olympic Committee due to the Russian invasion of Ukraine, as she considered that "treason to the Fatherland". In 2024, she accused American gymnast Simone Biles of being a drug cheat.

In 1959, she married Valentin Ivanov, a football player who won a gold medal at the 1956 Olympics. Their son Valentin (b. 1961), is a football referee and retired football player.

She was awarded the Order of the Badge of Honour (1960, 1980), Medal "For Labour Valour" (1985) and Medal "Veteran of Labour" (1985). In 2008, she and her husband won the national "Slava" award of 2007.
