= Elena Săcălici =

Romanian artistic gymnast

- Full name: Elena Săcălici-Petroşanu
- Born: 18 July 1935
- Died: 1 October 1959 (aged 24)

Gymnastics career
- Discipline: Women's artistic gymnastics
- Country represented: Romania
Medal record
Olympic Games
Bronze medal – third place	1956 Melbourne	Team competition
World Championships
Bronze medal – third place	1958 Moscow	Team competition

Elena (Ileana) Săcălici-Petroşanu (18 July 1935 – 1 October 1959) was a Romanian artistic gymnast who represented Romania at the 1956 Olympic Games. She was a member of the team that won the first team Olympic medal (1956) and of the team that won the first team world medal (1958) for Romania.
