= Ann-Sofi Pettersson =

Swedish gymnast

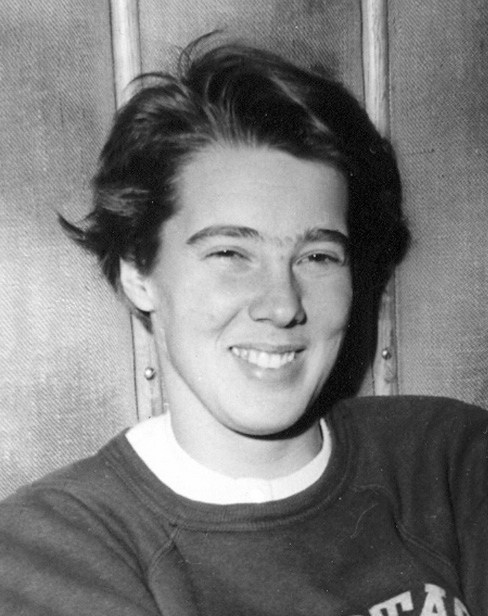

Personal information
- Born: 1 January 1932 (age 94) Stockholm, Sweden

Gymnastics career
- Country represented: Sweden (SWE)
- Club: SSIF, Stockholm
Medal record
Representing Sweden
Olympic Games
Gold medal – first place	1952 Helsinki	Team portable apparatus
Silver medal – second place	1956 Melbourne	Team portable apparatus
Bronze medal – third place	1956 Melbourne	Side horse vault
World Championships
Gold medal – first place	1950 Basel	Team all-around
Gold medal – first place	1950 Basel	Uneven bars
Silver medal – second place	1950 Basel	Ind. all-around
Gold medal – first place	1954 Rome	Vault

Elin Ann-Sofi Pettersson-Colling (later Saltin; born 1 January 1932) is a retired Swedish gymnast. She competed at the 1952 and 1956 Summer Olympics and won a gold and a silver medal in the obsolete event team portable apparatus. In 1956, she also won a bronze on the vault, the only Swedish gymnast to win an individual Olympic medal. Her landing was described as one of the best Olympic finishes of all time.

Pettersson was the national champion in 1951 to 1958 and sportswoman of the year in 1955. She later married Bengt Saltin, a sports scientist, and worked as a doctor.
