= Alena Reichová =

Czech gymnast (1933–2011)

Personal information
- Full name: Alena Reichová-Zámostná
- Born: 27 July 1933 Plzeň, Czechoslovakia
- Died: 21 June 2011 (aged 77)
Medal record
Women's artistic gymnastics
Representing Czechoslovakia
Olympic Games
| Bronze medal – third place | 1952 Helsinki | Team |

Alena Reichová-Zámostná (27 July 1933 – 21 June 2011) was a Czech gymnast who competed for Czechoslovakia in the 1952 Summer Olympics and in the 1956 Summer Olympics.
