= Matylda Růžičková-Šínová =

Czech gymnast (1933–2025)

Olympic medal record

Women's gymnastics

Representing Czechoslovakia
Silver medal – second place	1960 Rome	Team
Bronze medal – third place	1952 Helsinki	Team

Matylda Růžičková-Šínová (Note: born Šínová, married Matoušková, then married Růžičková; also known as Šínová-Matoušková and Matoušková-Šínová during her active career) (29 March 1933 – 7 December 2025) was a Czech gymnast who competed for Czechoslovakia in the 1952 Summer Olympics (bronze, team), in the 1956 Summer Olympics, and in the 1960 Summer Olympics (silver, team). After her active career, she was a university teacher in the field of physical education.

== Biography ==
Matylda Šínová was born in Brno on 29 March 1933. Her first husband was Jaroslav Matoušek. Her second husband was the gymnast and Olympic medalist Zdeněk Růžička. She studied pedagogy, which she devoted herself to after her active career ended. She taught in Prague, then at the Pedagogical Institute in Jihlava, and from 1964 to 1998 at the Department of Physical Education, Faculty of Education, Masaryk University in Brno.

Růžičková-Šínová died on 7 December 2025, at the age of 92.
