= Emilia Vătășoiu =

Romanian artistic gymnast

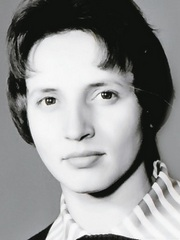

Personal information
- Full name: Emilia Vătășoiu-Liță
- Born: 20 October 1933 (age 92) Câineni, Romania
- Height: 156 cm (5 ft 1 in)

Gymnastics career
- Discipline: Women's artistic gymnastics
- Club: Dinamo Bucharest
Medal record
Representing Romania
Olympic Games
Bronze medal – third place	1956 Melbourne	Team
Bronze medal – third place	1960 Rome	Team
World Championships
Bronze medal – third place	1958 Moscow	Team

Emilia Vătășoiu-Liță (born 20 October 1933) is a Romanian retired artistic gymnast. She competed at the 1956, 1960 and 1964 Olympics and 1958 World Championships and won team bronze medals in 1956, 1958 and 1960.

Vătășoiu took up gymnastics in 1951, and in 1954 was included to the national team. After retiring from competitions she worked as a gymnastics coach and international referee.
