= Elena Lagorara =

Italian gymnast

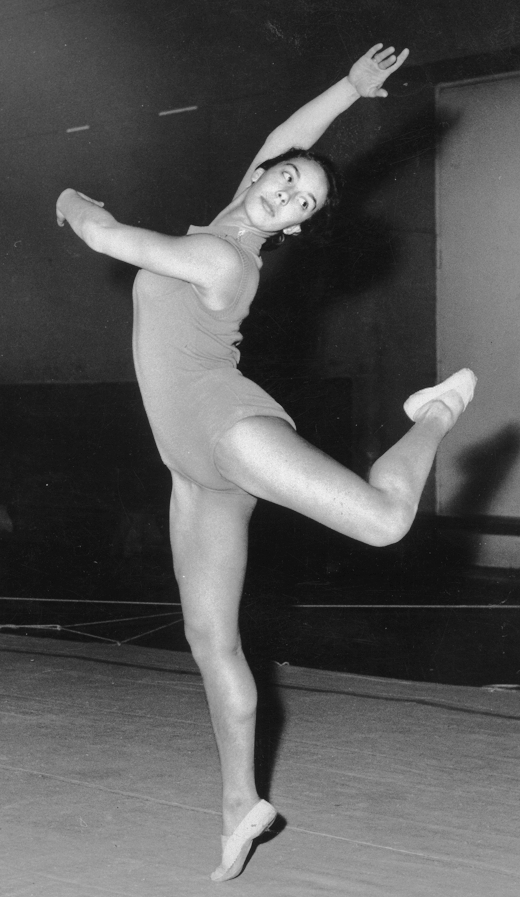
- Elena Lagorara in 1960

Personal information
- Born: 10 May 1939 Sestri Ponente, Italy
- Height: 158 cm (5 ft 2 in)
- Weight: 54 kg (119 lb)

Sport
- Sport: Artistic gymnastics
- Club: US Sestri Ponente

Elena Wilma Lagorara (10 May 1939 – 16 November 2003) was an Italian gymnast. She competed in all artistic gymnastics events at the 1956 and 1960 Summer Olympics with the best individual result of 12th place on the vault in 1956. Her elder sister Luciana competed alongside her in 1956. Elena Wilma Lagorara died in 2003.
