= Georgeta Hurmuzachi =

Romanian gymnast (born 1936)

- Full name: Georgeta Hurmuzachi-Dumitrescu
- Born: 23 January 1936 (age 90)

Gymnastics career
- Discipline: Women's artistic gymnastics
- Country represented: Romania
Medal record
Summer Olympics
| Bronze medal – third place | 1956 Melbourne | Team competition |

Georgeta Hurmuzachi-Dumitrescu (born 23 January 1936) is a retired Romanian artistic gymnast who represented Romania at the 1956 Olympic Games. She was a member of the team that won the first team Olympic medal for Romania.
