= Gymnastics at the 1956 Summer Olympics =

Gymnastics at the Games of the XVI Olympiad
- Venue: West Melbourne Stadium
- Dates: 3–7 December 1956

Gymnastics at the 1956 Summer Olympics was represented by 15 events: 7 for women and 8 for men. All events were held at the West Melbourne Stadium between December 3 and December 7. It is located some 3.4 km north-west of the main Olympic venue, Melbourne Cricket Ground, and was renamed Festival Hall.

== Format of competition ==
Each country was allowed to enter a team of eight gymnasts, but in contrast to the previous Olympics not more than six of them were allowed to participate in all exercises. Nations with incomplete teams, could enter one to three gymnasts for the individual competition.

=== Men's competition ===
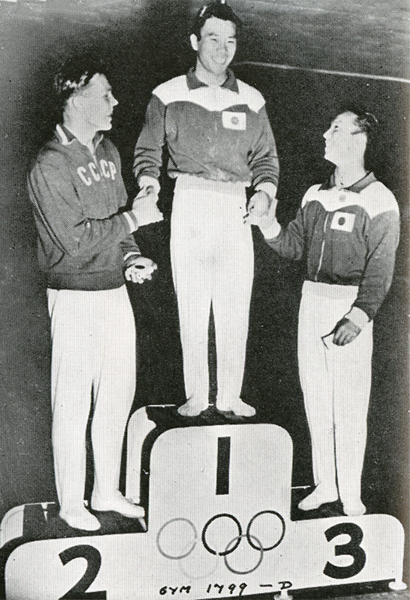
Yuri Titov, Takashi Ono, and Masao Takemoto on the podium for men's horizontal bar

The team included from five to eight gymnasts. Each team member performed compulsory and optional routines on each of six apparatus. Gymnast's scores in these performances counted for all of the events. Scores of gymnasts from incomplete teams counted only for individual events.

Like in the women's events, five best scores constituted the team's score for the routine. These scores constituted the overall team's totals.

=== Women's competition ===
Each team member performed compulsory and optional routines on each of four apparatus. Gymnast's scores in these performances counted for all of the events, except the separate team exercise with portable apparatus event (also known as group exercise with hand apparatus event), which was a group rhythmic exercises similar to the group competition event in rhythmic gymnastics. Scores of gymnasts from incomplete teams counted only for individual events.

The scoring in the team competition was different from the one at the previous Olympics, its principle became the same, as for men's events: five best scores constituted the team's score for the routine; these scores constituted the overall team's totals.

== Medal summary ==
=== Men's events ===
Games	Gold	Silver	Bronze
Individual all-around	Viktor Chukarin; Soviet Union	Takashi Ono; Japan	Yuri Titov; Soviet Union
Team all-around	Soviet Union; Albert Azaryan; Viktor Chukarin; Valentin Muratov; Boris Shakhlin; Pavel Stolbov; Yuri Titov	Japan; Nobuyuki Aihara; Akira Kono; Masami Kubota; Takashi Ono; Masao Takemoto; Shinsaku Tsukawaki	Finland; Raimo Heinonen; Olavi Laimuvirta; Onni Lappalainen; Berndt Lindfors; Martti Mansikka; Kalevi Suoniemi
Floor exercise	Valentin Muratov; Soviet Union	Nobuyuki Aihara; Japan	none awarded
Floor exercise	Valentin Muratov; Soviet Union	William Thoresson; Sweden	none awarded
Floor exercise	Valentin Muratov; Soviet Union	Viktor Chukarin; Soviet Union	none awarded
Horizontal bar	Takashi Ono; Japan	Yuri Titov; Soviet Union	Masao Takemoto; Japan
Parallel bars	Viktor Chukarin; Soviet Union	Masumi Kubota; Japan	Takashi Ono; Japan
Parallel bars	Viktor Chukarin; Soviet Union	Masumi Kubota; Japan	Masao Takemoto; Japan
Pommel horse	Boris Shakhlin; Soviet Union	Takashi Ono; Japan	Viktor Chukarin; Soviet Union
Rings	Albert Azaryan; Soviet Union	Valentin Muratov; Soviet Union	Masao Takemoto; Japan
Rings	Albert Azaryan; Soviet Union	Valentin Muratov; Soviet Union	Masumi Kubota; Japan
Vault	Helmut Bantz; United Team of Germany	none awarded	Yuri Titov; Soviet Union
Vault	Valentin Muratov; Soviet Union	none awarded	Yuri Titov; Soviet Union

=== Women's events ===
Games	Gold	Silver	Bronze
Individual all-around	Larisa Latynina; Soviet Union	Ágnes Keleti; Hungary	Sofia Muratova; Soviet Union
Team all-around	Soviet Union; Polina Astakhova; Lyudmila Yegorova; Lidia Kalinina; Larisa Latynina; Tamara Manina; Sofia Muratova	Hungary; Andrea Molnár-Bodó; Erzsébet Gulyás-Köteles; Ágnes Keleti; Alice Kertész; Margit Korondi; Olga Lemhényi-Tass	Romania; Georgeta Hurmuzachi; Sonia Iovan; Elena Leușteanu; Elena Mărgărit; Elena Săcălici; Emilia Vătășoiu
Balance beam	Ágnes Keleti; Hungary	Eva Bosáková; Czechoslovakia	none awarded
Balance beam	Ágnes Keleti; Hungary	Tamara Manina; Soviet Union	none awarded
Floor exercise	Ágnes Keleti; Hungary	none awarded	Elena Leușteanu; Romania
Floor exercise	Larisa Latynina; Soviet Union	none awarded	Elena Leușteanu; Romania
Uneven bars	Ágnes Keleti; Hungary	Larisa Latynina; Soviet Union	Sofia Muratova; Soviet Union
Vault	Larisa Latynina; Soviet Union	Tamara Manina; Soviet Union	Olga Lemhényi-Tass; Hungary
Vault	Larisa Latynina; Soviet Union	Tamara Manina; Soviet Union	Ann-Sofi Pettersson; Sweden
Team, portable apparatus	Hungary; Andrea Molnár-Bodó; Erzsébet Gulyás-Köteles; Ágnes Keleti; Alice Kertész; Margit Korondi; Olga Lemhényi-Tass	Sweden; Karin Lindberg; Ann-Sofi Pettersson; Eva Rönström; Evy Berggren; Doris Hedberg; Maud Karlén	Soviet Union; Polina Astakhova; Lyudmila Yegorova; Lidia Kalinina; Larisa Latynina; Tamara Manina; Sofia Muratova
Team, portable apparatus	Hungary; Andrea Molnár-Bodó; Erzsébet Gulyás-Köteles; Ágnes Keleti; Alice Kertész; Margit Korondi; Olga Lemhényi-Tass	Sweden; Karin Lindberg; Ann-Sofi Pettersson; Eva Rönström; Evy Berggren; Doris Hedberg; Maud Karlén	Poland; Helena Rakoczy; Natalia Kot-Wala; Danuta Stachow; Dorota Horzonek-Jokiel; Barbara Ślizowska; Lidia Szczerbińska

== Medal table ==
Rank	Nation	Gold	Silver	Bronze	Total
1	Soviet Union	11	6	6	23
2	Hungary	4	2	1	7
3	Japan	1	5	5	11
4	United Team of Germany	1	0	0	1
5	Sweden	0	2	1	3
6	Czechoslovakia	0	1	0	1
7	Romania	0	0	2	2
8	Finland	0	0	1	1
8	Poland	0	0	1	1
Totals (9 entries)		17	16	17	50

== Participating nations ==
- Australia (9)
- Austria (1)
- Bulgaria (6)
- Canada (2)
- Cuba (1)
- Czechoslovakia (12)
- Finland (6)
- France (5)
- United Team of Germany (6)
- Great Britain (3)
- Hungary (8)
- India (3)
- Italy (6)
- Japan (12)
- Luxembourg (2)
- Poland (6)
- Romania (6)
- South Africa (2)
- Soviet Union (12)
- Sweden (8)
- United States (12)

== Sources ==
- The Official Report of the Organizing Committee for the Games of the XVI Olympiad. Melbourne: W. M. Houston, Government Printer. 1958. Archived from the original on 2006-06-22.
