= Gymnastics at the 1948 Summer Olympics – Men's artistic individual all-around =

Olympic gymnastics event

Men's artistic individual all-around at the Games of the XIV Olympiad
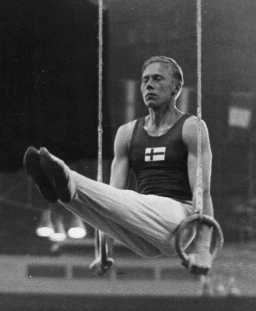
- Gold medalist Veikko Huhtanen
- Venue: Earls Court Exhibition Centre
- Date: 12–13 August 1948
- Competitors: 123 from 16 nations
- Winning score: 229.70

Medalists
1st place, gold medalist(s)		Veikko Huhtanen; Finland
2nd place, silver medalist(s)		Walter Lehmann; Switzerland
3rd place, bronze medalist(s)		Paavo Aaltonen; Finland

The men's artistic individual all-around competition at the 1948 Summer Olympics was held at Earls Court Exhibition Centre on 12 and 13 August. It was the tenth appearance of the event. There were 123 competitors from 16 nations, with each nation sending a team of up to 8 gymnasts. The event was won by Veikko Huhtanen of Finland, the nation's first victory in the men's all-around. Finland also earned bronze, with Paavo Aaltonen finishing third. For the second consecutive Games, Switzerland took silver—this time with Walter Lehmann as the nation's medalist.

== Background ==
This was the 10th appearance of the men's individual all-around. The first individual all-around competition had been held in 1900, after the 1896 competitions featured only individual apparatus events. A men's individual all-around has been held every Games since 1900.

Two of the top 10 gymnasts from the pre-war 1936 Games returned: fifth-place finisher Michael Reusch of Switzerland and ninth-place finisher Heikki Savolainen of Finland. Savolainen had also finished in the top 10 in 1928 and won a bronze medal in the event in 1932. Reigning gold medalist Alfred Schwarzmann was unable to defend his title due to Germany not being invited to the Games following World War II, though he would return in 1952. The last World Championships had been held in 1938, with no international competitions since the war, so it was difficult to determine a favorite.

Argentina, Cuba, and Mexico each made their debut in the event. Italy made its ninth appearance, most among nations, having missed only the 1904 Games in St. Louis.

== Competition format ==
The gymnastics format continued to use the aggregation format. Each nation entered a team of up to eight gymnasts (Cuba and Argentina had only 7; Mexico only 5). All entrants in the gymnastics competitions performed both a compulsory exercise and a voluntary exercise for each apparatus, with the scores summed to give a final total. The scores in each of the six apparatus competitions were added together to give individual all-around scores; the top six individual scores on each team were summed to give a team all-around score. No separate finals were contested.

For each exercise, four judges gave scores from 0 to 10 in one-tenth point increments. The top and bottom scores were discarded and the remaining two scores summed to give the exercise total. If the two scores were sufficiently far apart, the judges would "confer" and decide on a score. Thus, exercise scores ranged from 0 to 20, apparatus scores from 0 to 40, individual totals from 0 to 240, and team scores from 0 to 1,440.

== Schedule ==
All times are British Summer Time (UTC+1)

Date	Time	Round
Thursday, 12 August 1948	9:00	Final
Friday, 13 August 1948	9:00	Final, continued

== Results ==
Rank	Gymnast	Nation	Floor (gymnastics)	Pommel horse	Rings (gymnastics)	Parallel bars	Horizontal bar	Vault (gymnastics)	Total
1st place, gold medalist(s)	Veikko Huhtanen	Finland	36.3	38.7	37.8	39.3	39.2	38.4	229.7
2nd place, silver medalist(s)	Walter Lehmann	Switzerland	36.5	37.6	38.4	39.0	39.4	38.1	229.0
3rd place, bronze medalist(s)	Paavo Aaltonen	Finland	36.5	38.7	37.3	38.8	38.4	39.1	228.8
4	Josef Stalder	Switzerland	37.0	37.7	38.3	39.1	39.7	36.9	228.7
5	Christian Kipfer	Switzerland	36.5	37.2	37.8	39.1	38.6	37.9	227.1
6	Emil Studer	Switzerland	36.0	37.7	38.3	37.8	38.8	38.0	226.6
7	Zdeněk Růžička	Czechoslovakia	38.1	36.3	38.5	38.8	37.9	36.6	226.2
8	Kalevi Laitinen	Finland	37.15	36.9	37.4	38.1	38.1	38.0	225.65
9	Guido Figone	Italy	37.0	38.2	36.1	38.3	38.0	37.7	225.3
10	Olavi Rove	Finland	35.8	36.5	37.9	38.6	37.4	39.0	225.2
10	Lajos Tóth	Hungary	36.8	36.3	37.3	38.2	38.6	38.0	225.2
12	Einari Teräsvirta	Finland	35.8	37.0	36.8	38.4	38.7	38.3	225.0
13	Lajos Sántha	Hungary	37.3	37.1	36.8	38.7	38.8	35.6	224.3
14	Heikki Savolainen	Finland	34.65	38.7	38.1	38.9	37.1	36.5	223.95
15	Robert Lucy	Switzerland	36.0	37.1	37.0	37.8	37.5	37.9	223.3
16	László Baranyai	Hungary	36.0	36.3	37.9	38.1	36.5	37.6	222.4
17	Aleksanteri Saarvala	Finland	33.9	37.7	37.3	37.6	38.8	36.8	222.1
18	Michael Reusch	Switzerland	33.9	37.8	39.1	39.5	38.4	33.3	222.0
19	Ferenc Pataki	Hungary	38.7	35.2	37.8	38.0	33.1	38.5	221.3
20	Raymond Dot	France	37.8	32.4	36.4	38.0	38.8	37.4	220.8
21	Melchior Thalmann	Switzerland	36.6	36.5	36.5	37.9	35.5	37.6	220.6
22	Michel Mathiot	France	37.2	36.0	35.4	38.2	37.8	35.8	220.4
23	Pavel Benetka	Czechoslovakia	37.6	33.6	36.9	37.3	37.6	37.3	220.3
24	Lucien Masset	France	36.9	37.2	36.2	34.35	38.5	36.8	219.95
25	André Weingand	France	36.5	35.7	37.6	37.0	37.6	35.4	219.8
26	Luigi Zanetti	Italy	37.2	38.3	34.1	37.3	37.3	34.8	219.0
27	János Mogyorósi-Klencs	Hungary	38.4	34.3	35.85	35.9	36.0	38.5	218.95
28	Ernst Wister	Austria	37.2	36.4	35.7	36.1	35.8	37.7	218.9
29	Ferenc Várkõi	Hungary	36.3	36.4	36.7	36.6	34.7	38.0	218.7
30	Jozsef Fekete	Hungary	36.6	36.9	36.4	37.1	33.7	37.9	218.6
31	Sulo Salmi	Finland	32.05	35.2	37.3	36.8	38.0	38.1	217.45
32	Karl Frei	Switzerland	35.0	36.4	39.6	36.9	33.7	35.6	217.2
32	Savino Guglielmetti	Italy	32.3	36.9	36.0	38.5	37.2	36.3	217.2
34	Antoine Schildwein	France	36.7	34.8	37.2	35.4	36.0	36.4	216.5
35	Alphonse Anger	France	36.0	34.9	36.7	36.8	37.6	34.4	216.4
36	Karl Bohusch	Austria	37.1	36.3	33.9	33.8	36.7	36.6	214.4
36	Marcel de Wolf	France	36.0	36.2	36.4	35.7	34.8	35.3	214.4
38	Poul Jessen	Denmark	36.6	33.8	36.0	35.8	35.0	37.1	214.3
38	Gyözö Mogyorosi	Hungary	35.7	34.8	36.3	36.4	36.8	34.3	214.3
40	Domenico Grosso	Italy	34.6	36.6	34.2	35.4	36.6	36.7	214.1
40	Auguste Sirot	France	35.4	36.3	33.7	35.6	37.9	35.2	214.1
42	Jey Kugeler	Luxembourg	36.1	34.2	37.3	34.8	34.6	37.0	214.0
42	Quinto Vadi	Italy	34.1	37.4	34.4	35.7	36.6	35.8	214.0
44	Ed Scrobe	United States	34.3	35.6	34.6	37.8	36.6	35.0	213.9
45	Elkana Grønne	Denmark	37.65	32.25	37.5	35.8	33.1	37.2	213.5
46	Konrad Grilc	Yugoslavia	34.35	35.6	34.8	35.7	35.9	36.7	213.05
47	Miroslav Málek	Czechoslovakia	35.1	33.1	36.4	34.5	36.6	37.2	212.9
48	Vladimír Karas	Czechoslovakia	37.4	33.6	38.2	36.7	33.9	32.4	212.2
49	Vincent D'Autorio	United States	36.8	35.2	32.9	34.5	35.4	36.5	211.3
50	Leo Sotorník	Czechoslovakia	37.6	31.4	37.3	34.8	31.2	38.5	210.8
51	Danilo Fioravanti	Italy	36.3	34.4	33.5	35.9	36.6	34.0	210.7
52	František Wirth	Czechoslovakia	34.55	33.9	33.0	34.15	37.2	36.9	209.7
53	Bill Roetzheim	United States	36.3	36.4	27.9	36.0	36.4	36.1	209.1
54	Josip Kujundžić	Yugoslavia	37.1	32.0	32.5	34.5	35.5	37.3	208.9
55	Joe Kotys	United States	34.8	36.5	29.4	37.4	34.0	36.4	208.5
56	Freddy Jensen	Denmark	37.0	34.3	35.3	34.1	33.95	33.7	208.35
57	Ettore Perego	Italy	35.3	37.5	28.5	33.4	35.4	36.2	206.3
58	Arnold Thomsen	Denmark	36.6	31.65	35.1	32.1	33.3	37.5	206.25
59	Hans Friedrich	Austria	36.5	33.5	31.3	36.4	31.3	36.8	205.8
60	George Weedon	Great Britain	34.1	31.6	31.2	35.8	36.5	36.4	205.6
61	Willi Schreyer	Austria	36.1	34.9	32.2	33.0	36.1	33.1	205.4
62	Frank Cumiskey	United States	31.15	37.9	30.3	34.0	37.3	34.5	205.15
63	Ray Sorensen	United States	33.45	35.6	31.0	33.1	35.5	35.9	204.55
64	Josy Stoffel	Luxembourg	35.8	32.5	36.0	31.2	31.45	36.4	203.35
65	Vratislav Petráček	Czechoslovakia	34.2	32.3	36.9	35.3	31.3	33.3	203.3
66	Hans Sauter	Austria	33.75	36.0	31.8	34.25	34.4	32.9	203.1
67	Frank Turner	Great Britain	34.35	32.75	34.4	35.7	29.2	36.2	202.6
68	Vilhelm Møller	Denmark	37.0	28.7	34.7	31.9	31.85	37.6	201.75
69	William Bonsall	United States	33.2	33.2	31.75	33.1	32.95	37.5	201.7
70	Volmer Thomsen	Denmark	35.7	29.3	34.2	33.55	32.8	35.7	201.25
71	Miro Longyka	Yugoslavia	35.7	29.6	32.6	31.1	33.9	37.5	200.4
72	Egidio Armelloni	Italy	32.6	35.9	33.05	35.0	34.8	23.7	195.05
73	Gunner Olesen	Denmark	36.8	27.3	34.6	34.3	22.9	37.4	193.3
74	Gustav Hrubý	Czechoslovakia	36.1	35.6	35.5	26.8	21.3	37.8	193.1
75	Drago Jelić	Yugoslavia	29.9	32.75	32.4	28.45	33.9	34.4	191.8
76	Ivica Jelić	Yugoslavia	31.75	32.9	34.3	29.0	27.0	36.8	191.75
77	Polo Welfring	Luxembourg	33.5	25.0	32.3	27.45	33.9	37.1	189.25
78	Stjepan Boltižar	Yugoslavia	33.8	32.8	33.5	30.7	26.1	32.0	188.9
79	Ken Buffin	Great Britain	31.55	27.2	29.3	31.3	34.4	34.9	188.65
80	René Schroeder	Luxembourg	35.95	21.5	35.7	29.25	30.3	35.3	188.0
81	Rafael Lecuona	Cuba	29.25	34.3	32.0	31.8	26.35	34.0	187.7
82	Ali Zaky	Egypt	30.0	18.05	36.4	33.7	33.0	36.4	187.55
83	Alec Wales	Great Britain	30.5	35.8	33.15	33.9	29.45	18.0	180.8
84	Menn Krecke	Luxembourg	32.15	25.2	31.4	28.95	27.35	35.5	180.55
85	Jakob Šubelj	Yugoslavia	33.15	29.25	27.8	24.8	26.4	37.1	178.5
86	Moustafa Abdelal	Egypt	27.0	25.75	34.5	30.0	30.45	30.0	177.7
87	Mohamed Roushdi	Egypt	23.75	23.35	35.0	34.6	30.2	30.45	177.35
88	Ahmed Khalaf Ali	Egypt	26.25	24.85	30.7	31.8	30.05	33.5	177.15
89	Arturo Amos	Argentina	32.3	23.35	26.1	31.25	29.55	34.3	176.85
90	Pierre Schmitz	Luxembourg	25.8	22.55	32.7	27.25	31.2	35.8	175.3
91	Jos Bernard	Luxembourg	30.25	19.75	32.5	26.7	32.0	31.2	172.4
92	Percy May	Great Britain	30.0	26.75	30.8	31.2	19.5	33.2	171.45
93	Ali El-Hefnawi	Egypt	32.0	15.05	30.5	30.7	24.3	37.0	169.55
94	Mohamed Aly	Egypt	31.1	12.5	31.0	31.75	28.5	33.8	168.65
95	Mahmoud Abdel-Aal	Egypt	28.0	14.05	33.2	34.5	28.0	29.75	167.5
96	Georges Wengler	Luxembourg	27.65	28.25	32.3	23.75	23.15	31.6	166.7
97	Fernando Lecuona	Cuba	25.3	29.5	33.9	32.95	17.3	27.4	166.35
98	Jack Flaherty	Great Britain	23.25	26.5	33.9	28.75	36.9	16.0	165.3
99	Robert Pranz	Austria	28.75	31.6	29.8	24.0	29.4	21.0	164.55
100	Børge Minerth	Denmark	19.0	16.0	17.8	34.5	31.9	37.1	156.3
101	Ángel Aguiar	Cuba	31.0	20.2	34.9	27.45	14.5	28.1	156.15
102	Pedro Lonchibuco	Argentina	25.75	18.5	32.2	28.3	20.5	28.95	154.2
103	Karel Janež	Yugoslavia	29.85	23.6	21.8	29.0	16.0	32.2	152.45
104	Raimundo Rey	Cuba	31.3	29.85	20.25	24.3	16.25	30.1	152.05
105	Baldomero Rubiera	Cuba	23.8	21.5	32.95	22.5	19.0	31.4	151.15
106	Enrique Rapesta	Argentina	24.5	21.5	30.25	25.0	25.05	22.6	148.9
107	Ahmed Khalil El-Giddawi	Egypt	24.75	14.5	26.4	29.7	25.5	28.0	148.85
108	César Bonoris	Argentina	23.0	14.0	22.5	28.45	22.2	29.5	139.65
109	Roberto Villacián	Cuba	27.25	24.4	33.2	22.65	16.5	13.3	137.3
110	Alejandro Díaz	Cuba	29.05	27.75	26.2	17.25	16.5	20.0	136.75
111	Glyn Hopkins	Great Britain	25.75	23.95	23.0	21.25	13.75	27.1	134.8
112	Ivor Vice	Great Britain	28.5	23.5	23.6	16.25	13.0	29.65	134.5
113	Jorge Soler	Argentina	23.3	17.0	22.8	20.5	21.4	29.3	134.3
114	Gottfried Hermann	Austria	15.5	16.4	14.25	32.3	35.1	18.75	132.3
115	Roberto Núñez	Argentina	21.75	12.0	19.0	18.5	14.4	24.3	109.95
116	Jorge Castro	Mexico	20.0	11.0	14.5	14.5	17.0	26.9	103.9
117	Rubén Lira	Mexico	17.0	14.0	13.2	12.25	17.0	25.5	98.95
118	Dionisio Aguilar	Mexico	11.0	14.0	11.4	17.0	8.0	20.4	81.8
119	Louis Bordo	United States	17.6	12.0	16.75	14.9	15.75	–	77.0
120	Everardo Rios	Mexico	12.0	4.7	11.0	9.5	6.0	12.0	55.2
121	Jorge Vidal	Argentina	—	11.8	8.0	6.5	6.0	5.0	37.2
122	Nicanor Villarreal	Mexico	4.0	—	—	—	—	—	4.0
123	Willi Welt	Austria	—	—	—	2.0	—	—	2.0
