= Gymnastics at the 1948 Summer Olympics – Men's pommel horse =

Olympic gymnastics event

Men's pommel horse at the Games of the XIV Olympiad
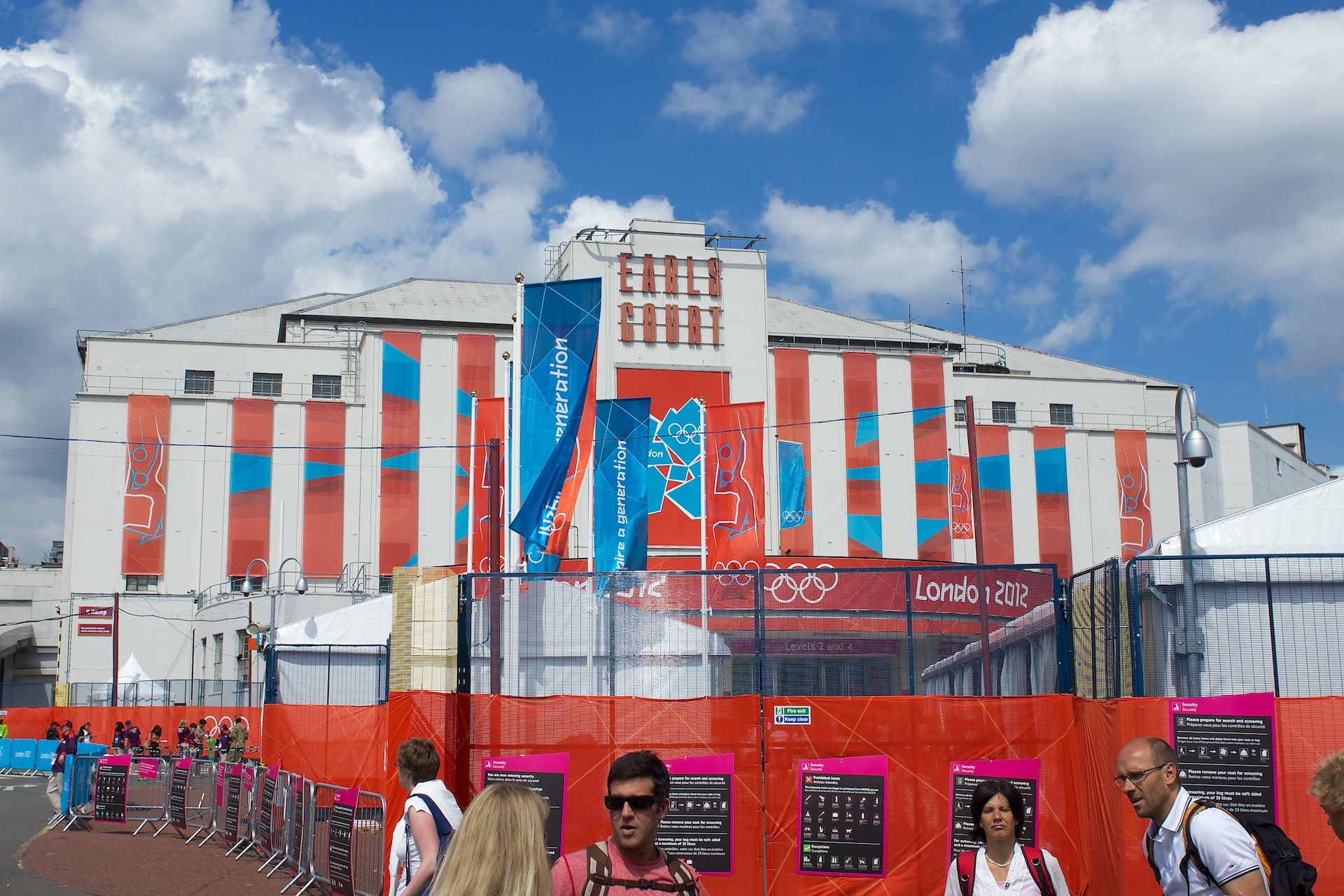
- Earls Court Exhibition Centre (2012)
- Venue: Earls Court Exhibition Centre
- Dates: 12–13 August 1948
- Competitors: 121 from 16 nations
- Winning score: 38.7

Medalists
1st place, gold medalist(s)		Paavo Aaltonen	Finland
1st place, gold medalist(s)		Veikko Huhtanen	Finland
1st place, gold medalist(s)		Heikki Savolainen	Finland

The men's pommel horse competition at the 1948 Summer Olympics was held at Earls Court Exhibition Centre on 12 and 13 August. It was the seventh appearance of the event. There were 121 competitors from 16 nations, with each nation sending a team of up to 8 gymnasts. The event ended in a three-way tie for the gold medal, with all three winners from Finland: Paavo Aaltonen, Veikko Huhtanen, and Heikki Savolainen. It was the third time the medals had been swept in the event (United States in 1904, Switzerland in 1924). Another three-way tie would occur in 1988. It was Finland's first victory in the event, and first medal since 1928.

== Background ==
This was the seventh appearance of the event, which is one of the five apparatus events held every time there were apparatus events at the Summer Olympics (no apparatus events were held in 1900, 1908, 1912, or 1920). One of the top 10 gymnasts from 1936 returned: seventh-place finisher Michael Reusch of Switzerland. Reusch had won the 1938 world championship, the last before World War II; there had not yet been another since the war, so he was the reigning champion.

Argentina, Cuba, Denmark, and Egypt each made their debut in the men's pommel horse. The United States made its sixth appearance, most of any nation, having missed only the inaugural 1896 Games.

== Competition format ==
The gymnastics format continued to use the aggregation format. Each nation entered a team of up to eight gymnasts (Cuba and Argentina had only 7; Mexico only 5). All entrants in the gymnastics competitions performed both a compulsory exercise and a voluntary exercise for each apparatus, with the scores summed to give a final total. The scores in each of the six apparatus competitions were added together to give individual all-around scores; the top six individual scores on each team were summed to give a team all-around score. No separate finals were contested.

For each exercise, four judges gave scores from 0 to 10 in one-tenth point increments. The top and bottom scores were discarded and the remaining two scores summed to give the exercise total. If the two scores were sufficiently far apart, the judges would "confer" and decide on a score. Thus, exercise scores ranged from 0 to 20, apparatus scores from 0 to 40, individual totals from 0 to 240, and team scores from 0 to 1,440.

== Schedule ==
All times are British Summer Time (UTC+1)

Date	Time	Round
Thursday, 12 August 1948	9:00	Compulsory
Friday, 13 August 1948	9:00	Voluntary

== Results ==
Rank	Gymnast	Nation	Compulsory	Voluntary	Total
1st place, gold medalist(s)	Paavo Aaltonen	Finland	19.2	19.5	38.7
1st place, gold medalist(s)	Veikko Huhtanen	Finland	19.2	19.5	38.7
1st place, gold medalist(s)	Heikki Savolainen	Finland	19.3	19.4	38.7
4	Luigi Zanetti	Italy	18.9	19.4	38.3
5	Guido Figone	Italy	19.0	19.2	38.2
6	Frank Cumiskey	United States	18.8	19.1	37.9
7	Michael Reusch	Switzerland	18.6	19.2	37.8
8	Aleksanteri Saarvala	Finland	19.2	18.5	37.7
8	Josef Stalder	Switzerland	19.3	18.4	37.7
8	Emil Studer	Switzerland	18.7	19.0	37.7
11	Walter Lehmann	Switzerland	18.4	19.2	37.6
12	Ettore Perego	Italy	18.9	18.6	37.5
13	Quinto Vadi	Italy	18.4	19.0	37.4
14	Christian Kipfer	Switzerland	18.3	18.9	37.2
14	Lucien Masset	France	19.1	18.1	37.2
16	Robert Lucy	Switzerland	18.8	18.3	37.1
16	Lajos Sántha	Hungary	18.3	18.8	37.1
18	Einari Teräsvirta	Finland	18.2	18.8	37.0
19	Jozsef Fekete	Hungary	18.4	18.5	36.9
19	Savino Guglielmetti	Italy	18.2	18.7	36.9
19	Kalevi Laitinen	Finland	17.5	19.4	36.9
22	Domenico Grosso	Italy	18.5	18.1	36.6
23	Joe Kotys	United States	17.9	18.6	36.5
23	Olavi Rove	Finland	17.9	18.6	36.5
23	Melchior Thalmann	Switzerland	18.3	18.2	36.5
26	Karl Frei	Switzerland	18.5	17.9	36.4
26	Bill Roetzheim	United States	18.5	17.9	36.4
26	Ernst Wister	Austria	18.0	18.4	36.4
26	Ferenc Várkõi	Hungary	18.4	18.0	36.4
30	László Baranyai	Hungary	17.3	19.0	36.3
30	Karl Bohusch	Austria	17.9	18.4	36.3
30	Zdeněk Růžička	Czechoslovakia	18.8	17.5	36.3
30	Auguste Sirot	France	18.0	18.3	36.3
30	Lajos Tóth	Hungary	18.1	18.2	36.3
35	Marcel de Wolf	France	18.0	18.2	36.2
36	Michel Mathiot	France	18.0	18.0	36.0
36	Hans Sauter	Austria	18.1	17.9	36.0
38	Egidio Armelloni	Italy	18.4	17.5	35.9
39	Alec Wales	Great Britain	17.6	18.2	35.8
40	André Weingand	France	18.4	17.3	35.7
41	Konrad Grilc	Yugoslavia	17.7	17.9	35.6
41	Gustav Hrubý	Czechoslovakia	18.7	16.9	35.6
41	Ed Scrobe	United States	17.4	18.2	35.6
41	Ray Sorensen	United States	17.8	17.8	35.6
45	Vincent D'Autorio	United States	18.7	16.5	35.2
45	Ferenc Pataki	Hungary	17.6	17.6	35.2
45	Sulo Salmi	Finland	16.9	18.3	35.2
48	Alphonse Anger	France	17.6	17.3	34.9
48	Willi Schreyer	Austria	16.9	18.0	34.9
50	Gyözö Mogyorosi	Hungary	17.8	17.0	34.8
50	Antoine Schildwein	France	16.8	18.0	34.8
52	Danilo Fioravanti	Italy	18.1	16.3	34.4
53	Freddy Jensen	Denmark	18.1	16.2	34.3
53	Rafael Lecuona	Cuba	18.0	16.3	34.3
53	János Mogyorósi-Klencs	Hungary	17.8	16.5	34.3
56	Jey Kugeler	Luxembourg	16.7	17.5	34.2
57	František Wirth	Czechoslovakia	18.3	15.6	33.9
58	Poul Jessen	Denmark	17.7	16.1	33.8
59	Pavel Benetka	Czechoslovakia	18.1	15.5	33.6
59	Vladimír Karas	Czechoslovakia	17.2	16.4	33.6
61	Hans Friedrich	Austria	18.1	15.4	33.5
62	William Bonsall	United States	16.1	17.1	33.2
63	Miroslav Málek	Czechoslovakia	17.0	16.1	33.1
64	Ivica Jelić	Yugoslavia	16.2	16.7	32.9
65	Stjepan Boltižar	Yugoslavia	15.8	17.0	32.8
66	Drago Jelić	Yugoslavia	17.0	15.75	32.75
66	Frank Turner	Great Britain	17.0	15.75	32.75
68	Josy Stoffel	Luxembourg	16.0	16.5	32.5
69	Raymond Dot	France	18.2	14.2	32.4
70	Vratislav Petráček	Czechoslovakia	15.6	16.7	32.3
71	Elkana Grønne	Denmark	18.0	14.25	32.25
72	Josip Kujundžić	Yugoslavia	15.4	16.6	32.0
73	Arnold Thomsen	Denmark	15.25	16.4	31.65
74	Robert Pranz	Austria	13.5	18.1	31.6
74	George Weedon	Great Britain	15.5	16.1	31.6
76	Leo Sotorník	Czechoslovakia	17.0	14.4	31.4
77	Raimundo Rey	Cuba	15.1	14.75	29.85
78	Miro Longyka	Yugoslavia	14.1	15.5	29.6
79	Fernando Lecuona	Cuba	16.5	13.0	29.5
80	Volmer Thomsen	Denmark	16.3	13.0	29.3
81	Jakob Šubelj	Yugoslavia	14.5	14.75	29.25
82	Vilhelm Møller	Denmark	14.75	13.95	28.7
83	Georges Wengler	Luxembourg	15.25	13.0	28.25
84	Alejandro Díaz	Cuba	14.5	13.25	27.75
85	Gunner Olesen	Denmark	14.3	13.0	27.3
86	Ken Buffin	Great Britain	14.95	12.25	27.2
87	Percy May	Great Britain	14.0	12.75	26.75
88	Jack Flaherty	Great Britain	12.0	14.5	26.5
89	Moustafa Abdelal	Egypt	12.0	13.75	25.75
90	Menn Krecke	Luxembourg	11.2	14.0	25.2
91	Polo Welfring	Luxembourg	10.0	15.0	25.0
92	Ahmed Khalaf Ali	Egypt	11.6	13.25	24.85
93	Roberto Villacián	Cuba	14.4	10.0	24.4
94	Glyn Hopkins	Great Britain	11.45	12.5	23.95
95	Karel Janež	Yugoslavia	13.6	10.0	23.6
96	Ivor Vice	Great Britain	11.0	12.5	23.5
97	Arturo Amos	Argentina	9.1	14.25	23.35
97	Mohamed Roushdi	Egypt	10.6	12.75	23.35
99	Pierre Schmitz	Luxembourg	9.8	12.75	22.55
100	Enrique Rapesta	Argentina	10.0	11.5	21.5
100	Baldomero Rubiera	Cuba	10.5	11.0	21.5
100	René Schroeder	Luxembourg	10.5	11.0	21.5
103	Ángel Aguiar	Cuba	10.2	10.0	20.2
104	Jos Bernard	Luxembourg	7.0	12.75	19.75
105	Pedro Lonchibuco	Argentina	6.0	12.5	18.5
106	Ali Zaky	Egypt	6.3	11.75	18.05
107	Jorge Soler	Argentina	6.0	11.0	17.0
108	Gottfried Hermann	Austria	16.4	—	16.4
109	Børge Minerth	Denmark	16.0	—	16.0
110	Ali El-Hefnawi	Egypt	5.3	9.75	15.05
111	Ahmed Khalil El-Giddawi	Egypt	5.5	9.0	14.5
112	Mahmoud Abdel-Aal	Egypt	4.8	9.25	14.05
113	Dario Aguilar	Mexico	4.0	10.0	14.0
113	César Bonoris	Argentina	4.0	10.0	14.0
113	Rubén Lira	Mexico	7.5	6.5	14.0
116	Mohamed Aly	Egypt	3.5	9.0	12.5
117	Louis Bordo	United States	12.0	—	12.0
117	Roberto Núñez	Argentina	4.0	8.0	12.0
119	Jorge Vidal	Argentina	11.8	—	11.8
120	Jorge Castro	Mexico	3.0	8.0	11.0
121	Everardo Rios	Mexico	4.7	—	4.7
