= Gymnastics at the 1948 Summer Olympics – Men's parallel bars =

Olympic gymnastics event

Men's parallel bars at the Games of the XIV Olympiad
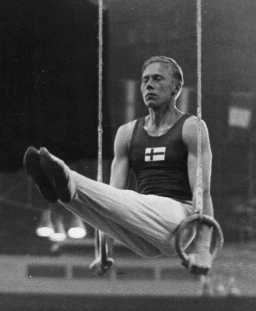
- Veikko Huhtanen competing on the rings
- Venue: Earls Court Exhibition Centre
- Dates: 12–13 August 1948
- Competitors: 122 from 16 nations
- Winning score: 39.5

Medalists
1st place, gold medalist(s)		Michael Reusch; Switzerland
2nd place, silver medalist(s)		Veikko Huhtanen; Finland
3rd place, bronze medalist(s)		Christian Kipfer; Switzerland
3rd place, bronze medalist(s)		Josef Stalder; Switzerland

The men's parallel bars competition at the 1948 Summer Olympics was held at Earls Court Exhibition Centre on 12 and 13 August. It was the seventh appearance of the event. There were 122 competitors from 16 nations, with each nation sending a team of up to 8 gymnasts. The event was won by Michael Reusch of Switzerland, with his countrymen Christian Kipfer and Josef Stalder tying for bronze. Between the Swiss gymnasts was Veikko Huhtanen of Finland, taking silver. Reusch was the first man to win multiple medals in the event (and the only one to do so 12 years apart); Stalder would become the second in 1952. It was Switzerland's second victory in the event, tying Germany for most gold medals.

== Background ==
This was the seventh appearance of the event, which is one of the five apparatus events held every time there were apparatus events at the Summer Olympics (no apparatus events were held in 1900, 1908, 1912, or 1920). Four of the top 10 gymnasts from 1936 returned: silver medalist Michael Reusch of Switzerland, seventh-place finisher Heikki Savolainen of Finland, ninth-place finisher Savino Guglielmetti of Italy, and tenth-place finisher Lajos Tóth of Hungary. Reusch was the reigning world champion, though the title was 10 years old—no world championship had yet been held post-World War II, so the 1938 event was the latest.

Argentina, Cuba, Denmark, and Egypt each made their debut in the men's parallel bars. The United States made its sixth appearance, most of any nation, having missed only the inaugural 1896 Games.

== Competition format ==
The gymnastics format continued to use the aggregation format. Each nation entered a team of up to eight gymnasts (Cuba and Argentina had only 7; Mexico only 5). All entrants in the gymnastics competitions performed both a compulsory exercise and a voluntary exercise for each apparatus, with the scores summed to give a final total. The scores in each of the six apparatus competitions were added together to give individual all-around scores; the top six individual scores on each team were summed to give a team all-around score. No separate finals were contested.

For each exercise, four judges gave scores from 0 to 10 in one-tenth point increments. The top and bottom scores were discarded and the remaining two scores summed to give the exercise total. If the two scores were sufficiently far apart, the judges would "confer" and decide on a score. Thus, exercise scores ranged from 0 to 20, apparatus scores from 0 to 40, individual totals from 0 to 240, and team scores from 0 to 1,440.

== Schedule ==
All times are British Summer Time (UTC+1)

Date	Time	Round
Thursday, 12 August 1948	9:00	Compulsory
Friday, 13 August 1948	9:00	Voluntary

== Results ==
Rank	Gymnast	Nation	Compulsory	Voluntary	Total
1st place, gold medalist(s)	Michael Reusch	Switzerland	19.8	19.7	39.5
2nd place, silver medalist(s)	Veikko Huhtanen	Finland	19.7	19.6	39.3
3rd place, bronze medalist(s)	Christian Kipfer	Switzerland	19.7	19.4	39.1
3rd place, bronze medalist(s)	Josef Stalder	Switzerland	19.3	19.8	39.1
5	Walter Lehmann	Switzerland	19.5	19.5	39.0
6	Heikki Savolainen	Finland	19.2	19.7	38.9
7	Paavo Aaltonen	Finland	19.0	19.8	38.8
7	Zdeněk Růžička	Czechoslovakia	19.6	19.2	38.8
9	Lajos Sántha	Hungary	19.4	19.3	38.7
10	Olavi Rove	Finland	19.5	19.1	38.6
11	Savino Guglielmetti	Italy	19.1	19.4	38.5
12	Einari Teräsvirta	Finland	19.5	18.9	38.4
13	Guido Figone	Italy	19.3	19.0	38.3
14	Michel Mathiot	France	18.9	19.3	38.2
14	Lajos Tóth	Hungary	19.1	19.1	38.2
16	László Baranyai	Hungary	19.3	18.8	38.1
16	Kalevi Laitinen	Finland	19.5	18.6	38.1
18	Raymond Dot	France	19.1	18.9	38.0
18	Ferenc Pataki	Hungary	19.1	18.9	38.0
20	Melchior Thalmann	Switzerland	19.1	18.8	37.9
21	Robert Lucy	Switzerland	18.9	18.9	37.8
21	Ed Scrobe	United States	18.8	19.0	37.8
21	Emil Studer	Switzerland	18.5	19.3	37.8
24	Aleksanteri Saarvala	Finland	18.2	19.4	37.6
25	Joe Kotys	United States	18.9	18.5	37.4
26	Pavel Benetka	Czechoslovakia	18.8	18.5	37.3
26	Luigi Zanetti	Italy	18.9	18.4	37.3
28	Jozsef Fekete	Hungary	18.5	18.6	37.1
29	André Weingand	France	18.2	18.8	37.0
30	Karl Frei	Switzerland	18.3	18.6	36.9
31	Alphonse Anger	France	18.6	18.2	36.8
31	Sulo Salmi	Finland	18.1	18.7	36.8
33	Vladimír Karas	Czechoslovakia	18.8	17.9	36.7
34	Ferenc Várkõi	Hungary	17.8	18.8	36.6
35	Hans Friedrich	Austria	18.3	18.1	36.4
35	Gyözö Mogyorosi	Hungary	18.1	18.3	36.4
37	Ernst Wister	Austria	18.1	18.0	36.1
38	Bill Roetzheim	United States	18.3	17.7	36.0
39	Danilo Fioravanti	Italy	17.4	18.5	35.9
39	János Mogyorósi-Klencs	Hungary	17.4	18.5	35.9
41	Elkana Grønne	Denmark	17.9	17.9	35.8
41	Poul Jessen	Denmark	18.0	17.8	35.8
41	George Weedon	Great Britain	18.0	17.8	35.8
44	Marcel de Wolf	France	18.2	17.5	35.7
44	Konrad Grilc	Yugoslavia	18.9	16.8	35.7
44	Frank Turner	Great Britain	17.7	18.0	35.7
44	Quinto Vadi	Italy	17.5	18.2	35.7
48	Auguste Sirot	France	17.6	18.0	35.6
49	Domenico Grosso	Italy	17.7	17.7	35.4
49	Antoine Schildwein	France	18.0	17.4	35.4
51	Vratislav Petráček	Czechoslovakia	17.6	17.7	35.3
52	Egidio Armelloni	Italy	17.6	17.4	35.0
53	Jey Kugeler	Luxembourg	17.6	17.2	34.8
53	Leo Sotorník	Czechoslovakia	18.6	16.2	34.8
55	Mohamed Roushdi	Egypt	16.7	17.9	34.6
56	Mahmoud Abdel-Aal	Egypt	17.5	17.0	34.5
56	Vincent D'Autorio	United States	16.6	17.9	34.5
56	Josip Kujundžić	Yugoslavia	17.4	17.1	34.5
56	Miroslav Málek	Czechoslovakia	17.4	17.1	34.5
56	Børge Minerth	Denmark	19.0	15.5	34.5
61	Lucien Masset	France	18.6	15.75	34.35
62	Gunner Olesen	Denmark	17.8	16.5	34.3
63	Hans Sauter	Austria	18.3	15.95	34.25
64	František Wirth	Czechoslovakia	18.7	15.45	34.15
65	Freddy Jensen	Denmark	17.6	16.5	34.1
66	Frank Cumiskey	United States	16.2	17.8	34.0
67	Alec Wales	Great Britain	16.5	17.4	33.9
68	Karl Bohusch	Austria	17.2	16.6	33.8
69	Ali Zaky	Egypt	15.7	18.0	33.7
70	Volmer Thomsen	Denmark	17.8	15.75	33.55
71	Ettore Perego	Italy	15.6	17.8	33.4
72	William Bonsall	United States	15.8	17.3	33.1
72	Ray Sorensen	United States	15.6	17.5	33.1
74	Willi Schreyer	Austria	16.1	16.9	33.0
75	Fernando Lecuona	Cuba	17.7	15.25	32.95
76	Gottfried Hermann	Austria	17.8	14.5	32.3
77	Arnold Thomsen	Denmark	17.6	14.5	32.1
78	Vilhelm Møller	Denmark	15.0	16.9	31.9
79	Ahmed Khalaf Ali	Egypt	14.9	16.9	31.8
79	Rafael Lecuona	Cuba	17.3	14.5	31.8
81	Mohamed Aly	Egypt	17.0	14.75	31.75
82	Ken Buffin	Great Britain	16.3	15.0	31.3
83	Arturo Amos	Argentina	17.0	14.25	31.25
84	Percy May	Great Britain	15.0	16.2	31.2
84	Josy Stoffel	Luxembourg	17.7	13.5	31.2
86	Miro Longyka	Yugoslavia	18.1	13.0	31.1
87	Stjepan Boltižar	Yugoslavia	14.9	15.8	30.7
87	Ali El-Hefnawi	Egypt	16.7	14.0	30.7
89	Moustafa Abdelal	Egypt	14.0	16.0	30.0
90	Ahmed Khalil El-Giddawi	Egypt	16.2	13.5	29.7
91	René Schroeder	Luxembourg	14.0	15.25	29.25
92	Karel Janež	Yugoslavia	14.5	14.5	29.0
92	Ivica Jelić	Yugoslavia	14.5	14.5	29.0
94	Menn Krecke	Luxembourg	14.7	14.25	28.95
95	Jack Flaherty	Great Britain	16.0	12.75	28.75
96	César Bonoris	Argentina	14.2	14.25	28.45
96	Drago Jelić	Yugoslavia	14.4	14.05	28.45
98	Pedro Lonchibuco	Argentina	13.3	15.0	28.3
99	Ángel Aguiar	Cuba	15.7	11.75	27.45
99	Polo Welfring	Luxembourg	16.2	11.25	27.45
101	Pierre Schmitz	Luxembourg	14.0	13.25	27.25
102	Gustav Hrubý	Czechoslovakia	16.8	10.0	26.8
103	Jos Bernard	Luxembourg	13.2	13.5	26.7
104	Enrique Rapesta	Argentina	11.0	14.0	25.0
105	Jakob Šubelj	Yugoslavia	13.8	11.0	24.8
106	Raimundo Rey	Cuba	12.8	11.5	24.3
107	Robert Pranz	Austria	10.5	13.5	24.0
108	Georges Wengler	Luxembourg	10.5	13.25	23.75
109	Roberto Villacián	Cuba	14.4	8.25	22.65
110	Baldomero Rubiera	Cuba	13.5	9.0	22.5
111	Glyn Hopkins	Great Britain	7.5	13.75	21.25
112	Jorge Soler	Argentina	7.0	13.5	20.5
113	Roberto Núñez	Argentina	6.5	12.0	18.5
114	Alejandro Díaz	Cuba	6.0	11.25	17.25
115	Dario Aguilar	Mexico	6.0	11.0	17.0
116	Ivor Vice	Great Britain	1.0	15.25	16.25
117	Louis Bordo	United States	14.9	–	14.9
118	Jorge Castro	Mexico	7.0	7.5	14.5
119	Rubén Lira	Mexico	4.0	8.25	12.25
120	Everardo Rios	Mexico	9.5	–	9.5
121	Jorge Vidal	Argentina	6.5	–	6.5
122	Willi Welt	Austria	2.0	–	2.0
