= Gymnastics at the 1948 Summer Olympics – Men's horizontal bar =

Olympic gymnastics event

Men's horizontal bar at the Games of the XIV Olympiad
- Artistic gymnastics pictogram
- Venue: Earls Court Exhibition Centre
- Dates: 12–13 August 1948
- Competitors: 121 from 16 nations
- Winning score: 39.7

Medalists
1st place, gold medalist(s)		Josef Stalder; Switzerland
2nd place, silver medalist(s)		Walter Lehmann; Switzerland
3rd place, bronze medalist(s)		Veikko Huhtanen; Finland

The men's horizontal bar competition at the 1948 Summer Olympics was held at Earls Court Exhibition Centre on 12 and 13 August. It was the seventh appearance of the event. There were 121 competitors from 16 nations, with each nation sending a team of up to 8 gymnasts. The event was won by Josef Stalder of Switzerland, with his countryman Walter Lehmann taking silver. It was the nation's second victory in the event (after 1928), tying the United States for most all-time. Veikko Huhtanen of Finland earned bronze, giving Finland a three-Games podium streak in the event.

== Background ==
This was the seventh appearance of the event, which is one of the five apparatus events held every time there were apparatus events at the Summer Olympics (no apparatus events were held in 1900, 1908, 1912, or 1920). Two of the top 10 gymnasts from 1936 returned: gold medalist Aleksanteri Saarvala and fifth-place finisher Heikki Savolainen of Finland. Savolainen was competing in his fourth Olympics; he had placed 13th in 1928 and won the silver medal in 1932. The reigning world champion, Michael Reusch of Switzerland, had won that title in 1938; he was still competing and a serious contender (taking gold in the parallel bars in London).

Argentina, Cuba, Denmark, and Egypt each made their debut in the men's parallel bars. The United States made its sixth appearance, most of any nation, having missed only the inaugural 1896 Games.

== Competition format ==
The gymnastics format continued to use the aggregation format. Each nation entered a team of up to eight gymnasts (Cuba and Argentina had only 7; Mexico only 5). All entrants in the gymnastics competitions performed both a compulsory exercise and a voluntary exercise for each apparatus, with the scores summed to give a final total. The scores in each of the six apparatus competitions were added together to give individual all-around scores; the top six individual scores on each team were summed to give a team all-around score. No separate finals were contested.

For each exercise, four judges gave scores from 0 to 10 in one-tenth point increments. The top and bottom scores were discarded and the remaining two scores summed to give the exercise total. If the two scores were sufficiently far apart, the judges would "confer" and decide on a score. Thus, exercise scores ranged from 0 to 20, apparatus scores from 0 to 40, individual totals from 0 to 240, and team scores from 0 to 1,440.

== Schedule ==
All times are British Summer Time (UTC+1)

Date	Time	Round
Thursday, 12 August 1948	9:00	Compulsory
Friday, 13 August 1948	9:00	Voluntary

== Results ==
Rank	Gymnast	Nation	Compulsory	Voluntary	Total
1st place, gold medalist(s)	Josef Stalder	Switzerland	19.8	19.9	39.7
2nd place, silver medalist(s)	Walter Lehmann	Switzerland	19.7	19.7	39.4
3rd place, bronze medalist(s)	Veikko Huhtanen	Finland	19.6	19.6	39.2
4	Raymond Dot	France	19.3	19.5	38.8
4	Aleksanteri Saarvala	Finland	19.0	19.8	38.8
4	Lajos Sántha	Hungary	19.4	19.4	38.8
4	Emil Studer	Switzerland	19.5	19.3	38.8
8	Einari Teräsvirta	Finland	19.5	19.2	38.7
9	Christian Kipfer	Switzerland	19.2	19.4	38.6
9	Lajos Tóth	Hungary	19.0	19.6	38.6
11	Lucien Masset	France	19.3	19.2	38.5
12	Paavo Aaltonen	Finland	18.8	19.6	38.4
12	Michael Reusch	Switzerland	19.6	18.8	38.4
14	Kalevi Laitinen	Finland	19.1	19.0	38.1
15	Guido Figone	Italy	19.2	18.8	38.0
15	Sulo Salmi	Finland	19.1	18.9	38.0
17	Zdeněk Růžička	Czechoslovakia	19.5	18.4	37.9
17	Auguste Sirot	France	18.6	19.3	37.9
19	Michel Mathiot	France	18.5	19.3	37.8
20	Alphonse Anger	France	19.0	18.6	37.6
20	Pavel Benetka	Czechoslovakia	18.7	18.9	37.6
20	André Weingand	France	18.9	18.7	37.6
23	Robert Lucy	Switzerland	18.6	18.9	37.5
24	Olavi Rove	Finland	18.5	18.9	37.4
25	Frank Cumiskey	United States	18.6	18.7	37.3
25	Luigi Zanetti	Italy	19.0	18.3	37.3
27	Savino Guglielmetti	Italy	18.9	18.3	37.2
27	František Wirth	Czechoslovakia	18.6	18.6	37.2
29	Heikki Savolainen	Finland	19.5	17.6	37.1
30	Jack Flaherty	Great Britain	18.0	18.9	36.9
31	Gyözö Mogyorosi	Hungary	18.0	18.8	36.8
32	Karl Bohusch	Austria	18.9	17.8	36.7
33	Danilo Fioravanti	Italy	18.1	18.5	36.6
33	Domenico Grosso	Italy	18.5	18.1	36.6
33	Miroslav Málek	Czechoslovakia	18.3	18.3	36.6
33	Ed Scrobe	United States	18.8	17.8	36.6
33	Quinto Vadi	Italy	18.4	18.2	36.6
38	László Baranyai	Hungary	17.7	18.8	36.5
38	George Weedon	Great Britain	18.1	18.4	36.5
40	Bill Roetzheim	United States	17.8	18.6	36.4
41	Willi Schreyer	Austria	18.8	17.3	36.1
42	János Mogyorósi-Klencs	Hungary	18.0	18.0	36.0
42	Antoine Schildwein	France	16.8	19.2	36.0
44	Konrad Grilc	Yugoslavia	18.4	17.5	35.9
45	Ernst Wister	Austria	19.3	16.5	35.8
46	Josip Kujundžić	Yugoslavia	17.5	18.0	35.5
46	Ray Sorensen	United States	17.2	18.3	35.5
46	Melchior Thalmann	Switzerland	17.6	17.9	35.5
49	Vincent D'Autorio	United States	18.0	17.4	35.4
49	Ettore Perego	Italy	18.4	17.0	35.4
51	Gottfried Hermann	Austria	18.0	17.1	35.1
52	Poul Jessen	Denmark	17.2	17.8	35.0
53	Egidio Armelloni	Italy	18.3	16.5	34.8
53	Marcel de Wolf	France	16.2	18.6	34.8
55	Ferenc Várkõi	Hungary	16.6	18.1	34.7
56	Jey Kugeler	Luxembourg	16.0	18.6	34.6
57	Ken Buffin	Great Britain	17.4	17.0	34.4
57	Hans Sauter	Austria	17.5	16.9	34.4
59	Joe Kotys	United States	17.2	16.8	34.0
60	Freddy Jensen	Denmark	15.75	18.2	33.95
61	Drago Jelić	Yugoslavia	17.4	16.5	33.9
61	Vladimír Karas	Czechoslovakia	17.3	16.6	33.9
61	Miro Longyka	Yugoslavia	17.4	16.5	33.9
61	Polo Welfring	Luxembourg	16.2	17.7	33.9
65	Jozsef Fekete	Hungary	17.4	16.3	33.7
65	Karl Frei	Switzerland	15.0	18.7	33.7
67	Arnold Thomsen	Denmark	15.5	17.8	33.3
68	Elkana Grønne	Denmark	16.2	16.9	33.1
68	Ferenc Pataki	Hungary	14.0	19.1	33.1
70	Ali Zaky	Egypt	17.6	15.4	33.0
71	William Bonsall	United States	15.25	17.7	32.95
72	Volmer Thomsen	Denmark	16.4	16.4	32.8
73	Jos Bernard	Luxembourg	15.0	17.0	32.0
74	Børge Minerth	Denmark	16.8	15.1	31.9
75	Vilhelm Møller	Denmark	14.75	17.1	31.85
76	Josy Stoffel	Luxembourg	14.75	16.7	31.45
77	Hans Friedrich	Austria	18.0	13.3	31.3
77	Vratislav Petráček	Czechoslovakia	16.0	15.3	31.3
79	Pierre Schmitz	Luxembourg	15.0	16.2	31.2
79	Leo Sotorník	Czechoslovakia	14.0	17.2	31.2
81	Moustafa Abdelal	Egypt	13.75	16.7	30.45
82	René Schroeder	Luxembourg	15.5	14.8	30.3
83	Mohamed Roushdi	Egypt	14.0	16.2	30.2
84	Ahmed Khalaf Ali	Egypt	13.75	16.3	30.05
85	Arturo Amos	Argentina	15.75	13.8	29.55
86	Alec Wales	Great Britain	12.25	17.2	29.45
87	Robert Pranz	Austria	13.0	16.4	29.4
88	Frank Turner	Great Britain	13.0	16.2	29.2
89	Mohamed Aly	Egypt	10.6	17.9	28.5
90	Mahmoud Abdel-Aal	Egypt	16.0	12.0	28.0
91	Menn Krecke	Luxembourg	11.75	15.6	27.35
92	Ivica Jelić	Yugoslavia	14.0	13.0	27.0
93	Jakob Šubelj	Yugoslavia	10.0	16.4	26.4
94	Rafael Lecuona	Cuba	10.75	15.6	26.35
95	Stjepan Boltižar	Yugoslavia	10.5	15.6	26.1
96	Ahmed Khalil El-Giddawi	Egypt	9.5	16.0	25.5
97	Enrique Rapesta	Argentina	10.25	14.8	25.05
98	Ali El-Hefnawi	Egypt	10.5	13.8	24.3
99	Georges Wengler	Luxembourg	9.25	13.9	23.15
100	Gunner Olesen	Denmark	6.0	16.9	22.9
101	César Bonoris	Argentina	8.0	14.2	22.2
102	Jorge Soler	Argentina	8.5	12.9	21.4
103	Gustav Hrubý	Czechoslovakia	15.3	6.0	21.3
104	Pedro Lonchibuco	Argentina	6.0	14.5	20.5
105	Percy May	Great Britain	6.0	13.5	19.5
106	Baldomero Rubiera	Cuba	4.5	14.5	19.0
107	Fernando Lecuona	Cuba	5.5	11.8	17.3
108	Jorge Castro	Mexico	6.0	11.0	17.0
108	Rubén Lira	Mexico	3.0	14.0	17.0
110	Alejandro Díaz	Cuba	5.5	11.0	16.5
110	Roberto Villacián	Cuba	5.5	11.0	16.5
112	Raimundo Rey	Cuba	6.25	10.0	16.25
113	Karel Janež	Yugoslavia	8.0	8.0	16.0
114	Louis Bordo	United States	15.75	—	15.75
115	Ángel Aguiar	Cuba	5.5	9.0	14.5
116	Roberto Núñez	Argentina	5.0	9.4	14.4
117	Glyn Hopkins	Great Britain	5.25	8.5	13.75
118	Ivor Vice	Great Britain	4.5	8.5	13.0
119	Dario Aguilar	Mexico	2.0	6.0	8.0
120	Everardo Rios	Mexico	6.0	—	6.0
120	Jorge Vidal	Argentina	6.0	—	6.0
