= Gymnastics at the 1948 Summer Olympics – Men's floor =

Olympic gymnastics event

Men's floor exercise at the Games of the XIV Olympiad
- Venue: Earls Court Exhibition Centre
- Date: 12–13 August 1948
- Competitors: 121 from 16 nations
- Winning score: 38.7

Medalists
1st place, gold medalist(s)		Ferenc Pataki	Hungary
2nd place, silver medalist(s)		János Mogyorósi-Klencs	Hungary
3rd place, bronze medalist(s)		Zdeněk Růžička	Czechoslovakia

The men's floor exercise competition at the 1948 Summer Olympics was held at Earls Court Exhibition Centre on 12 and 13 August. It was the third appearance of the event.

== Competition format ==
The gymnastics format continued to use the aggregation format. Each nation entered a team of up to eight gymnasts (Cuba and Argentina had only 7; Mexico only 5). All entrants in the gymnastics competitions performed both a compulsory exercise and a voluntary exercise for each apparatus, with the scores summed to give a final total. The scores in each of the six apparatus competitions were added together to give individual all-around scores; the top six individual scores on each team were summed to give a team all-around score. No separate finals were contested.

For each exercise, four judges gave scores from 0 to 10 in one-tenth point increments. The top and bottom scores were discarded and the remaining two scores summed to give the exercise total. If the two scores were sufficiently far apart, the judges would "confer" and decide on a score. Thus, exercise scores ranged from 0 to 20, apparatus scores from 0 to 40, individual totals from 0 to 240, and team scores from 0 to 1,440.

== Results ==
Rank	Gymnast	Nation	Compulsory	Voluntary	Total
1st place, gold medalist(s)	Ferenc Pataki	Hungary	19.3	19.4	38.7
2nd place, silver medalist(s)	János Mogyorósi-Klencs	Hungary	19.5	18.9	38.4
3rd place, bronze medalist(s)	Zdeněk Růžička	Czechoslovakia	19.1	19.0	38.1
4	Raymond Dot	France	18.8	19.0	37.8
5	Elkana Grønne	Denmark	18.45	19.2	37.65
6	Pavel Benetka	Czechoslovakia	18.9	18.7	37.6
6	Leo Sotorník	Czechoslovakia	18.8	18.8	37.6
8	Vladimír Karas	Czechoslovakia	18.8	18.6	37.4
9	Lajos Sántha	Hungary	18.9	18.4	37.3
10	Michel Mathiot	France	18.5	18.7	37.2
10	Ernst Wister	Austria	17.9	19.3	37.2
10	Luigi Zanetti	Italy	18.6	18.6	37.2
13	Kalevi Laitinen	Finland	18.75	18.4	37.15
14	Karl Bohusch	Austria	18.6	18.5	37.1
14	Josip Kujundžić	Yugoslavia	18.5	18.6	37.1
16	Guido Figone	Italy	18.9	18.1	37.0
16	Freddy Jensen	Denmark	18.7	18.3	37.0
16	Vilhelm Møller	Denmark	18.7	18.3	37.0
16	Josef Stalder	Switzerland	18.6	18.4	37.0
20	Lucien Masset	France	18.1	18.8	36.9
21	Vincent D'Autorio	United States	18.1	18.7	36.8
21	Gunner Olesen	Denmark	18.4	18.4	36.8
21	Lajos Tóth	Hungary	18.7	18.1	36.8
24	Antoine Schildwein	France	18.2	18.5	36.7
25	Jozsef Fekete	Hungary	18.2	18.4	36.6
25	Poul Jessen	Denmark	17.9	18.7	36.6
25	Melchior Thalmann	Switzerland	18.5	18.1	36.6
25	Arnold Thomsen	Denmark	18.3	18.3	36.6
29	Paavo Aaltonen	Finland	18.5	18.0	36.5
29	Hans Friedrich	Austria	17.9	18.6	36.5
29	Christian Kipfer	Switzerland	18.4	18.1	36.5
29	Walter Lehmann	Switzerland	18.3	18.2	36.5
29	André Weingand	France	18.3	18.2	36.5
34	Danilo Fioravanti	Italy	17.9	18.4	36.3
34	Veikko Huhtanen	Finland	17.8	18.5	36.3
34	Bill Roetzheim	United States	18.55	17.75	36.3
34	Ferenc Várkõi	Hungary	18.8	17.5	36.3
38	Gustav Hrubý	Czechoslovakia	18.1	18.0	36.1
38	Jey Kugeler	Luxembourg	17.7	18.4	36.1
38	Willi Schreyer	Austria	17.8	18.3	36.1
41	Alphonse Anger	France	17.8	18.2	36.0
41	László Baranyai	Hungary	18.3	17.7	36.0
41	Marcel de Wolf	France	17.9	18.1	36.0
41	Robert Lucy	Switzerland	18.3	17.7	36.0
41	Emil Studer	Switzerland	18.8	17.2	36.0
46	René Schroeder	Luxembourg	17.75	18.2	35.95
47	Olavi Rove	Finland	17.9	17.9	35.8
47	Josy Stoffel	Luxembourg	17.4	18.4	35.8
47	Einari Teräsvirta	Finland	17.6	18.2	35.8
50	Miro Longyka	Yugoslavia	17.5	18.2	35.7
50	Gyözö Mogyorosi	Hungary	17.9	17.8	35.7
50	Volmer Thomsen	Denmark	18.0	17.7	35.7
53	Auguste Sirot	France	17.5	17.9	35.4
54	Ettore Perego	Italy	18.3	17.0	35.3
55	Miroslav Málek	Czechoslovakia	17.5	17.6	35.1
56	Karl Frei	Switzerland	17.0	18.0	35.0
57	Joe Kotys	United States	16.3	18.5	34.8
58	Heikki Savolainen	Finland	17.55	17.1	34.65
59	Domenico Grosso	Italy	17.7	16.9	34.6
60	František Wirth	Czechoslovakia	17.8	17.35	34.55
61	Konrad Grilc	Yugoslavia	16.25	18.1	34.35
61	Frank Turner	Great Britain	17.55	16.8	34.35
63	Ed Scrobe	United States	17.9	16.4	34.3
64	Vratislav Petráček	Czechoslovakia	16.0	18.2	34.2
65	Quinto Vadi	Italy	17.1	17.0	34.1
65	George Weedon	Great Britain	16.0	18.1	34.1
67	Michael Reusch	Switzerland	16.2	17.7	33.9
67	Aleksanteri Saarvala	Finland	17.9	16.0	33.9
69	Stjepan Boltižar	Yugoslavia	17.0	16.8	33.8
70	Hans Sauter	Austria	17.0	16.75	33.75
71	Polo Welfring	Luxembourg	15.4	18.2	33.5
72	Ray Sorensen	United States	16.75	16.7	33.45
73	William Bonsall	United States	17.95	15.25	33.2
74	Jakob Šubelj	Yugoslavia	15.95	17.2	33.15
75	Egidio Armelloni	Italy	15.9	16.7	32.6
76	Arturo Amos	Argentina	16.0	16.3	32.3
76	Savino Guglielmetti	Italy	15.0	17.3	32.3
78	Menn Krecke	Luxembourg	14.75	17.4	32.15
79	Sulo Salmi	Finland	17.05	15.0	32.05
80	Ali El-Hefnawi	Egypt	17.0	15.0	32.0
81	Ivica Jelić	Yugoslavia	16.0	15.75	31.75
82	Ken Buffin	Great Britain	16.05	15.5	31.55
83	Raimundo Rey	Cuba	16.3	15.0	31.3
84	Frank Cumiskey	United States	17.4	13.75	31.15
85	Mohamed Aly	Egypt	16.1	15.0	31.1
86	Ángel Aguiar	Cuba	16.25	14.75	31.0
87	Alec Wales	Great Britain	15.0	15.5	30.5
88	Jos Bernard	Luxembourg	13.75	16.5	30.25
89	Percy May	Great Britain	15.5	14.5	30.0
89	Ali Zaky	Egypt	15.5	14.5	30.0
91	Drago Jelić	Yugoslavia	13.0	16.9	29.9
92	Karel Janež	Yugoslavia	14.0	15.85	29.85
93	Rafael Lecuona	Cuba	14.75	14.5	29.25
94	Alejandro Díaz	Cuba	14.25	14.8	29.05
95	Robert Pranz	Austria	13.0	15.75	28.75
96	Ivor Vice	Great Britain	13.5	15.0	28.5
97	Mahmoud Abdel-Aal	Egypt	14.75	13.25	28.0
98	Georges Wengler	Luxembourg	12.75	14.9	27.65
99	Roberto Villacián	Cuba	12.75	14.5	27.25
100	Moustafa Abdelal	Egypt	14.25	12.75	27.0
101	Ahmed Khalaf Ali	Egypt	13.25	13.0	26.25
102	Pierre Schmitz	Luxembourg	9.0	16.8	25.8
103	Glyn Hopkins	Great Britain	13.5	12.25	25.75
103	Pedro Lonchibuco	Argentina	12.25	13.5	25.75
105	Fernando Lecuona	Cuba	11.0	14.3	25.3
106	Ahmed Khalil El-Giddawi	Egypt	13.0	11.75	24.75
107	Enrique Rapesta	Argentina	11.5	13.0	24.5
108	Baldomero Rubiera	Cuba	11.5	12.3	23.8
109	Mohamed Roushdi	Egypt	10.0	13.75	23.75
110	Jorge Soler	Argentina	12.0	11.3	23.3
111	Jack Flaherty	Great Britain	9.5	13.75	23.25
112	César Bonoris	Argentina	10.0	13.0	23.0
113	Roberto Núñez	Argentina	10.5	11.25	21.75
114	Jorge Castro	Mexico	11.0	9.0	20.0
115	Børge Minerth	Denmark	19.0	–	19.0
116	Louis Bordo	United States	17.6	–	17.6
117	Rubén Lira	Mexico	9.5	7.5	17.0
118	Gottfried Hermann	Austria	15.5	–	15.5
119	Everardo Rios	Mexico	12.0	–	12.0
120	Dario Aguilar	Mexico	4.0	7.0	11.0
121	Nicolas Villareal	Mexico	4.0	–	4.0
