= Gymnastics at the 1948 Summer Olympics – Men's vault =

Olympic gymnastics event

Men's vault at the Games of the XIV Olympiad
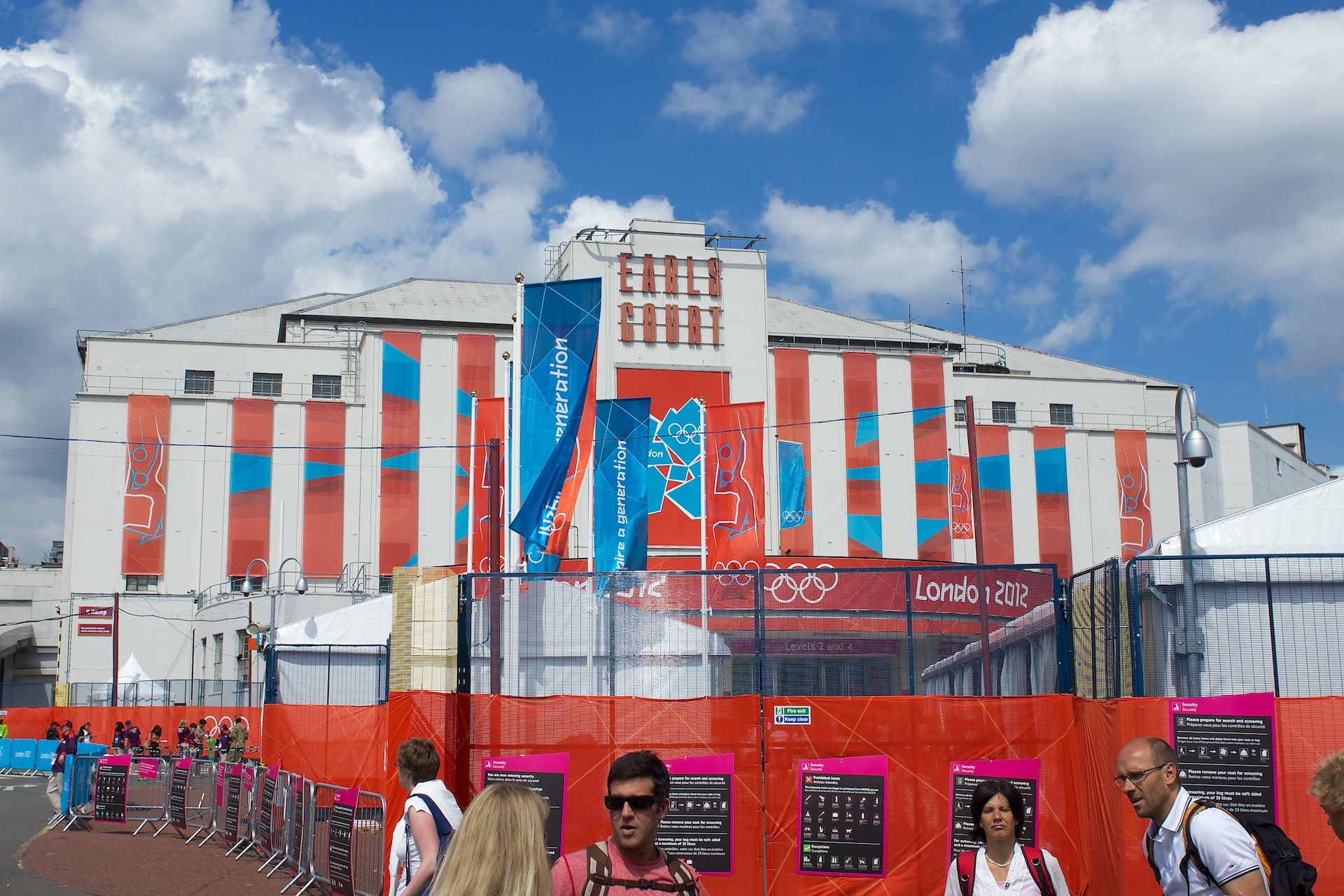
- Earls Court Exhibition Centre (2012)
- Venue: Earls Court Exhibition Centre
- Dates: 12–13 August 1948
- Competitors: 120 from 16 nations
- Winning score: 39.1

Medalists
1st place, gold medalist(s)		Paavo Aaltonen; Finland
2nd place, silver medalist(s)		Olavi Rove; Finland
3rd place, bronze medalist(s)		János Mogyorósi-Klencs; Hungary
3rd place, bronze medalist(s)		Ferenc Pataki; Hungary
3rd place, bronze medalist(s)		Leo Sotorník; Czechoslovakia

The men's vault competition at the 1948 Summer Olympics was held at Earls Court Exhibition Centre on 12 and 13 August. It was the seventh appearance of the event. There were 120 competitors from 16 nations, with each nation sending a team of up to 8 gymnasts. The event was won by Paavo Aaltonen of Finland with fellow Finn Olavi Rove finishing second; the medals were the nation's first in the men's vault. There was a three-way tie for third place resulting in three bronze medals being awarded to János Mogyorósi-Klencs and Ferenc Pataki of Hungary and Leo Sotorník of Czechoslovakia.

== Background ==
This was the seventh appearance of the event, which is one of the five apparatus events held every time there were apparatus events at the Summer Olympics (no apparatus events were held in 1900, 1908, 1912, or 1920). One of the top 10 gymnasts from 1936 returned: seventh-place finisher Michael Reusch of Switzerland. There had been no world championship yet after World War II, so the reigning two-time world champion was 40-year-old Eugen Mack, who had won Olympic gold in 1928 and silver in 1936; he did not compete.

Argentina, Cuba, Denmark, Egypt, and Mexico each made their debut in the men's vault. The United States made its sixth appearance, most of any nation, having missed only the inaugural 1896 Games.

== Competition format ==
The gymnastics format continued to use the aggregation format. The event used a "vaulting horse" aligned parallel to the gymnast's run (rather than the modern "vaulting table" in use since 2004). Each nation entered a team of up to eight gymnasts (Cuba and Argentina had only 7; Mexico only 5), though 3 gymnasts did not compete in the vault (one each from Austria, Mexico, and the United States). All entrants in the gymnastics competitions performed both a compulsory exercise and a voluntary exercise for each apparatus, with the scores summed to give a final total. The scores in each of the six apparatus competitions were added together to give individual all-around scores; the top six individual scores on each team were summed to give a team all-around score. No separate finals were contested.

For each exercise, four judges gave scores from 0 to 10 in one-tenth point increments. The top and bottom scores were discarded and the remaining two scores summed to give the exercise total. If the two scores were sufficiently far apart, the judges would "confer" and decide on a score. Thus, exercise scores ranged from 0 to 20, apparatus scores from 0 to 40, individual totals from 0 to 240, and team scores from 0 to 1,440. For the vault, each gymnast attempted both the compulsory and voluntary vaults twice, with the better score counting.

== Schedule ==
All times are British Summer Time (UTC+1)

Date	Time	Round
Thursday, 12 August 1948	9:00	Compulsory
Friday, 13 August 1948	9:00	Voluntary

== Results ==
Rank	Gymnast	Nation	Compulsory	Voluntary	Total
1st place, gold medalist(s)	Paavo Aaltonen	Finland	19.6	19.5	39.1
2nd place, silver medalist(s)	Olavi Rove	Finland	19.6	19.4	39.0
3rd place, bronze medalist(s)	János Mogyorósi-Klencs	Hungary	18.9	19.6	38.5
3rd place, bronze medalist(s)	Ferenc Pataki	Hungary	19.0	19.5	38.5
3rd place, bronze medalist(s)	Leo Sotorník	Czechoslovakia	19.1	19.4	38.5
6	Veikko Huhtanen	Finland	19.5	18.9	38.4
7	Einari Teräsvirta	Finland	19.3	19.0	38.3
8	Walter Lehmann	Switzerland	19.0	19.1	38.1
8	Sulo Salmi	Finland	19.2	18.9	38.1
10	Kalevi Laitinen	Finland	19.3	18.7	38.0
10	Emil Studer	Switzerland	19.2	18.8	38.0
10	Lajos Tóth	Hungary	18.9	19.1	38.0
10	Ferenc Várkõi	Hungary	18.6	19.4	38.0
14	Jozsef Fekete	Hungary	18.7	19.2	37.9
14	Christian Kipfer	Switzerland	19.0	18.9	37.9
14	Robert Lucy	Switzerland	19.0	18.9	37.9
17	Gustav Hrubý	Czechoslovakia	18.7	19.1	37.8
18	Guido Figone	Italy	19.1	18.6	37.7
18	Ernst Wister	Austria	18.7	19.0	37.7
20	László Baranyai	Hungary	18.7	18.9	37.6
20	Vilhelm Møller	Denmark	19.3	18.3	37.6
20	Melchior Thalmann	Switzerland	19.0	18.6	37.6
23	William Bonsall	United States	18.5	19.0	37.5
23	Miro Longyka	Yugoslavia	18.3	19.2	37.5
23	Arnold Thomsen	Denmark	18.6	18.9	37.5
26	Raymond Dot	France	19.1	18.3	37.4
26	Gunner Olesen	Denmark	18.9	18.5	37.4
28	Pavel Benetka	Czechoslovakia	18.2	19.1	37.3
28	Josip Kujundžić	Yugoslavia	18.1	19.2	37.3
30	Elkana Grønne	Denmark	18.4	18.8	37.2
30	Miroslav Málek	Czechoslovakia	18.6	18.6	37.2
32	Poul Jessen	Denmark	18.6	18.5	37.1
32	Børge Minerth	Denmark	18.4	18.7	37.1
32	Jakob Šubelj	Yugoslavia	18.2	18.9	37.1
32	Polo Welfring	Luxembourg	18.3	18.8	37.1
36	Ali El-Hefnawi	Egypt	18.1	18.9	37.0
36	Jey Kugeler	Luxembourg	38.3	18.7	37.0
38	Josef Stalder	Switzerland	18.7	18.2	36.9
38	František Wirth	Czechoslovakia	18.4	18.5	36.9
40	Hans Friedrich	Austria	18.6	18.2	36.8
40	Ivica Jelić	Yugoslavia	18.0	16.8	36.8
40	Lucien Masset	France	18.8	18.0	36.8
40	Aleksanteri Saarvala	Finland	18.7	18.1	36.8
44	Konrad Grilc	Yugoslavia	17.5	19.2	36.7
44	Domenico Grosso	Italy	18.5	18.2	36.7
46	Karl Bohusch	Austria	18.4	18.2	36.6
46	Zdeněk Růžička	Czechoslovakia	17.9	18.7	36.6
48	Vincent D'Autorio	United States	18.6	17.9	36.5
48	Heikki Savolainen	Finland	18.5	18.0	36.5
50	Joe Kotys	United States	18.7	17.7	36.4
50	Antoine Schildwein	France	18.3	18.1	36.4
50	Josy Stoffel	Luxembourg	18.2	18.2	36.4
50	George Weedon	Great Britain	18.2	18.2	36.4
50	Ali Zaky	Egypt	18.4	18.0	36.4
55	Savino Guglielmetti	Italy	18.0	18.3	36.3
56	Ettore Perego	Italy	18.2	18.0	36.2
56	Frank Turner	Great Britain	18.1	18.1	36.2
58	Bill Roetzheim	United States	18.3	17.8	36.1
59	Ray Sorensen	United States	18.6	17.3	35.9
60	Michel Mathiot	France	18.2	17.6	35.8
60	Pierre Schmitz	Luxembourg	17.7	18.1	35.8
60	Quinto Vadi	Italy	18.0	17.8	35.8
63	Volmer Thomsen	Denmark	18.7	17.0	35.7
64	Karl Frei	Switzerland	317.1	18.5	35.6
64	Lajos Sántha	Hungary	18.3	17.3	35.6
66	Menn Krecke	Luxembourg	17.6	17.9	35.5
67	André Weingand	France	17.7	17.7	35.4
68	Marcel de Wolf	France	18.0	17.3	35.3
68	René Schroeder	Luxembourg	16.8	18.5	35.3
70	Auguste Sirot	France	17.1	18.2	35.2
71	Ed Scrobe	United States	16.7	18.3	35.0
72	Ken Buffin	Great Britain	17.7	17.2	34.9
73	Luigi Zanetti	Italy	16.8	18.0	34.8
74	Frank Cumiskey	United States	18.5	16.0	34.5
75	Alphonse Anger	France	16.0	18.4	34.4
75	Drago Jelić	Yugoslavia	17.2	17.2	34.4
77	Arturo Amos	Argentina	16.0	18.3	34.3
77	Gyözö Mogyorosi	Hungary	18.2	16.1	34.3
79	Danilo Fioravanti	Italy	16.0	18.0	34.0
79	Rafael Lecuona	Cuba	18.0	16.0	34.0
81	Mohamed Aly	Egypt	15.8	18.0	33.8
82	Freddy Jensen	Denmark	15.6	18.1	33.7
83	Ahmed Khalaf Ali	Egypt	17.0	16.5	33.5
84	Vratislav Petráček	Czechoslovakia	15.8	17.5	33.3
84	Michael Reusch	Switzerland	16.1	17.2	33.3
86	Percy May	Great Britain	16.0	17.2	33.2
87	Willi Schreyer	Austria	14.2	18.9	33.1
88	Hans Sauter	Austria	14.4	18.5	32.9
89	Vladimír Karas	Czechoslovakia	14.4	18.0	32.4
90	Karel Janež	Yugoslavia	13.8	18.4	32.2
91	Stjepan Boltižar	Yugoslavia	15.3	11.7	32.0
92	Georges Wengler	Luxembourg	15.6	16.0	31.6
93	Baldomero Rubiera	Cuba	15.6	15.8	31.4
94	Jos Bernard	Luxembourg	15.3	15.9	31.2
95	Mohamed Roushdi	Egypt	15.25	15.2	30.45
96	Raimundo Rey	Cuba	15.6	14.5	30.1
97	Moustafa Abdelal	Egypt	13.1	16.9	30.0
98	Mahmoud Abdel-Aal	Egypt	13.95	15.8	29.75
99	Ivor Vice	Great Britain	13.65	16.0	29.65
100	César Bonoris	Argentina	16.1	13.4	29.5
101	Jorge Soler	Argentina	12.0	17.3	29.3
102	Pedro Lonchibuco	Argentina	13.75	15.2	28.95
103	Ángel Aguiar	Cuba	11.8	16.3	28.1
104	Ahmed Khalil El-Giddawi	Egypt	11.5	16.5	28.0
105	Fernando Lecuona	Cuba	15.4	12.0	27.4
106	Glyn Hopkins	Great Britain	14.1	13.0	27.1
107	Jorge Castro	Mexico	16.9	10.0	26.9
108	Rubén Lira	Mexico	11.5	14.0	25.5
109	Roberto Núñez	Argentina	13.0	11.3	24.3
110	Egidio Armelloni	Italy	6.0	17.7	23.7
111	Enrique Rapesta	Argentina	11.0	11.6	22.6
112	Robert Pranz	Austria	5.0	16.0	21.0
113	Dario Aguilar	Mexico	4.0	16.4	20.4
114	Alejandro Díaz	Cuba	6.0	14.0	20.0
115	Gottfried Hermann	Austria	6.0	12.75	18.75
116	Alec Wales	Great Britain	5.0	13.0	18.0
117	Jack Flaherty	Great Britain	6.0	10.0	16.0
118	Roberto Villacián	Cuba	13.3	—	13.3
119	Everardo Rios	Mexico	12.0	—	12.0
120	Jorge Vidal	Argentina	5.0	—	5.0
