= Austria at the 1948 Summer Olympics =

- IOC code: AUT
- NOC: Austrian Olympic Committee

in London
- Competitors: 147 (115 men, 32 women) in 17 sports
- Medals Ranked 21st: Gold 1 Silver 0 Bronze 3 Total 4

Summer Olympics appearances (overview)
- 1896; 1900; ~~1904~~; 1908; 1912; 1920; 1924; 1928; 1932; 1936; 1948; 1952; 1956; 1960; 1964; 1968; 1972; 1976; 1980; 1984; 1988; 1992; 1996; 2000; 2004; 2008; 2012; 2016; 2020; 2024; 2028

Other related appearances
- 1906 Intercalated Games

Austria competed at the 1948 Summer Olympics in London, England. 147 competitors, 115 men and 32 women, took part in 79 events in 17 sports.

== Medalists ==
Medal	Name	Sport	Event
Gold	Herma Bauma	Athletics	Women's Javelin
Bronze	Ine Schäffer	Athletics	Women's Shot Put
Bronze	Fritzi Schwingl	Canoeing	Women's K-1 500m
Bronze	Ellen Preis	Fencing	Women's Individual Foil

== Athletics ==
Key

- Note–Ranks given for track events are within the athlete's heat only
- Q = Qualified for the next round
- q = Qualified for the next round as a fastest loser or, in field events, by position without achieving the qualifying target
- NR = National record
- OR = Olympic record
- N/A = Round not applicable for the event
- Bye = Athlete not required to compete in round
- NP = Not placed

Men
Field Events

Athlete	Event	Qualification		Final	
Athlete	Event	Distance	Position	Distance	Position
Felix Würth	Long Jump	7.08	8 Q	7.00	8
Arnulf Pilhatsch	High Jump	1.84	21	did not advance	
Felix Würth	Triple Jump	13.92	21	did not advance	
Hermann Tunner	Discus throw	45.92	10 Q	44.43	11

Women
Track & road events

Athlete	Event	Heat		Semifinal		Final	
Athlete	Event	Result	Rank	Result	Rank	Result	Rank
Maria Oberbreyer	100 m		4	did not advance			
Grete Pavlousek	100 m		4	did not advance			
Grete Pavlousek	200 m		4	did not advance			
Maria Oberbreyer	80 m Hurdles	11.9	3 Q	11.9	2 Q	11.8	5
Elfriede Steurer	80 m Hurdles	12.2	1 Q	12.4	6	did not advance	
Grete Jenny; Elfriede Steurer; Grete Pavlousek; Maria Oberbreyer	4 × 100 m relay	50.0	2 Q	—N/a		49.2	6

Women
Field events

Athlete	Event	Qualification		Final	
Athlete	Event	Distance	Position	Distance	Position
Ilse Steinegger	long jump	5.30	10 Q	5.19	10
Maria Oberbreyer	long jump	5.35	9	5.24	9
Ilse Steinegger	high jump	—N/a		1.55	7
Ine Schäffer	Shot put	—N/a		13.08	3rd place, bronze medalist(s)
Anni Bruk	Shot put	—N/a		12.50	6
Marianne Schläger	Shot put	—N/a		11.75	12
Lotte Haidegger	Discus throw	—N/a		38.81	5
Frieda Tiltsch	Discus throw	—N/a		37.19	9
Marianne Schläger	Discus throw	—N/a		34.79	15
Herma Bauma	Javelin throw	—N/a		45.57	(gold) OR
Gerda Schilling-Staniek	Javelin throw	—N/a		38.01	9

== Boxing ==
Athlete	Event	Round of 32	Round of 16	Quarterfinals	Semifinals	Final	
Athlete	Event	Opposition Result	Opposition Result	Opposition Result	Opposition Result	Opposition Result	Rank
Robert Gausterer	Flyweight	Han (KOR); L PTS	did not advance				
Hermann Mazurkiewitsch	Bantamweight	Carrizo (URU); L PTS	did not advance				
Eduard Kerschbaumer	Featherweight	Bye	Verdú (ESP); W PTS	Núñez (ARG); L PTS	did not advance		
Otto Michtits	Light heavyweight	Siljander (FIN); L PTS	did not advance				
Karl Ameisbichler	Heavyweight	Bye	Gardner (GBR); L KO2	did not advance			

Five other competitors did not start: Hans Schmöllerl (flyweight), Franz Dyma (bantamweight), W. Müller (featherweight), Norbert Oschgan (light heavyweight) and Otto Hofstätter (heavyweight)

== Canoeing ==
DNS = did not start

Men

Canoe Singles - Men's C-1 1,000 metres
Karl Molnar DNS

Canoe Singles - Men's C-1 10,000 metres
Karl Molnar DNS

Canoe Doubles - Men's C-2 1,000 metres
Karl Molnar, Viktor Salmhofer (5th)

Canoe Doubles - Men's C-2 1,0000 metres
Karl Molnar, Viktor Salmhofer (4th)

Kayak Singles - Men's K-1 1,000 metres
Walter Piemann (8th)

Kayak Singles - Men's K-1 10,000 metres
Herbert Klepp (10th)

Kayak Doubles - Men's K-2 1,000 metres
Paul Felinger, Herbert Klepp (5th place, Heat 2)

Kayak Doubles - Men's K-2 10,000 metres
Walter Piemann, Alfred Umgeher (9th)

Women
Kayak Singles – Women's K-1 500 metres
Fritzi Schwingl Bronze

== Cycling ==
Eight cyclists, all men, represented Austria in 1948.

Individual road race

- Rudi Valenta
- Hans Goldschmid
- Siegmund Huber
- Josef Pohnetal

Team road race

- Rudi Valenta
- Hans Goldschmid
- Siegmund Huber
- Josef Pohnetal

Sprint

- Erich Welt

Time trial

- Walter Freitag

Tandem

- Kurt Nemetz
- Erich Welt

Team pursuit

- Walter Freitag
- Hans Goldschmid
- Josef Pohnetal
- Heinrich Schiebel

== Diving ==
Men

Athlete	Event	Final	
Athlete	Event	Points	Rank
Wilhelm Lippa	3 m springboard	103.18	19
Franz Worisch	3 m springboard	112.15	12
Wilhelm Lippa	10 m platform	89.04	17
Franz Worisch	10 m platform	90.05	15

Women

Athlete	Event	Final	
Athlete	Event	Points	Rank
Gudrun Grömer	3 m springboard	93.30	5
Alma Staudinger	3 m springboard	86.93	11
Gudrun Grömer	10 m platform	DNF	
Alma Staudinger	10 m platform	64.59	4

== Equestrian ==
Individual dressage
Alois Podhajsky on Teja (7th)

Individual eventing
Heinrich Sauer on Sobri - DNF

== Fencing ==
Seven fencers, four men and three women, represented Austria in 1948.

Men's sabre

- Hubert Loisel
- Heinz Putzl
- Werner Plattner

Men's team sabre

- Werner Plattner, Heinz Putzl, Heinz Lechner, Hubert Loisel

A fifth competitor in the individual sabre and team sabre events, Karl Hanisch, did not start.

Women's foil

- Ellen Müller-Preis
- Fritzi Wenisch-Filz
- Gabriele Zeilinger

== Football ==
Head coach: Eduard Frühwirth

Pos.	Player	DoB	Age	Caps	Club	Tournament games	Tournament goals	Minutes played	Sub off	Sub on	Cards yellow/red
FW	Josef Epp	1 Mar 1920	28	?	(Austria) Wiener Sportclub	1	0	90	-	-	-
FW	Erich Habitzl	9 Oct 1923	24	?	(Austria) SK Admira Wien	1	0	90	-	-	-
FW	Wilhelm Hahnemann	14 Apr 1914	34	?	(Austria) SC Wacker Wien	1	0	90	-	-	-
DF	Ernst Happel	29 Nov 1925	22	?	(Austria) SK Rapid Wien	1	0	90	-	-	-
MF	Siegfried Joksch	4 Jul 1917	31	?	FK Austria Wien	1	0	90	-	-	-
FW	Alfred Körner	14 Feb 1926	22	?	(Austria) SK Rapid Wien	1	0	90	-	-	-
DF	Karl Kowanz	15 Apr 1926	22	?	(Austria) SK Admira Wien	1	0	65	-	-	/1red
FW	Ernst Melchior	26 Jun 1920	28	?	FK Austria Wien	1	0	90	-	-	-
MF	Leopold Mikolasch	17 Oct 1920	27	?	FK Austria Wien	1	0	90	-	-	-
DF	Ernst Ocwirk	7 Mar 1926	22	?	FK Austria Wien	1	0	90	-	-	1 yel. / -
GK	Franz Pelikan	6 Nov 1925	22	?	(Austria) SC Wacker Wien	1	0	90	-	-	-
	Stand-by players -
MF	Theodor Brinek	9 May 1921	27	?	(Austria) SC Wacker Wien	0	0	0	-	-	-
MF	Karl Decker	5 Sep 1921	26	?	(Austria) First Vienna FC	0	0	0	-	-	-
FW	Ludwig Durek	27 Jan 1921	27	?	(Austria) SK Sturm Graz	0	0	0	-	-	-
GK	Bruno Engelmeier	5 Sep 1927	20	?	(Austria) First Vienna FC	0	0	0	-	-	-
DF	Gustav Gerhart	4 Feb 1922	26	?	(Austria) SK Admira Wien	0	0	0	-	-	-
MF	Leopold Gernhardt	16 Mar 1920	28	?	(Austria) SK Rapid Wien	0	0	0	-	-	-
GK	Josef Musil	7 Aug 1920	27	?	(Austria) SK Rapid Wien	0	0	0	-	-	-
FW	Ernst Stojaspal	14 Jan 1925	23	?	FK Austria Wien	0	0	0	-	-	-
FW	Josef Stroh	5 Mar 1913	35	?	FK Austria Wien	0	0	0	-	-	-
FW	Theodor Wagner	6 Aug 1927	20	?	(Austria) SC Wacker Wien	0	0	0	-	-	-

== Gymnastics ==
Men

Gymnast	Event	Score	Rank
Ernst Wister	Men's all-around	229.7	28th
Karl Bohusch	Men's all-around	228.8	=36th
Hans Friedrich	Men's all-around	225.65	59th
Willi Schreyer	Men's all-around	225.2	61st
Hans Sauter	Men's all-around	225.0	66th
Robert Pranz	Men's all-around	223.95	99th
Gottfried Hermann	Men's all-around	221.1	114th
Willi Welt	Men's all-around	217.45	123rd
Ernst Wister	Men's team all-around		9th
Karl Bohusch	Men's team all-around		9th
Hans Friedrich	Men's team all-around		9th
Willi Schreyer	Men's team all-around		9th
Hans Sauter	Men's team all-around		9th
Robert Pranz	Men's team all-around		9th
Gottfried Hermann	Men's team all-around		9th
Willi Welt	Men's team all-around		9th
Karl Bohusch	Men's horizontal bar		32nd
Willi Schreyer	Men's horizontal bar		41st
Ernst Wister	Men's horizontal bar		45th
Gottfried Hermann	Men's horizontal bar		51st
Hans Sauter	Men's horizontal bar		=57th
Hans Friedrich	Men's horizontal bar		=77th
Robert Pranz	Men's horizontal bar		87th
Hans Friedrich	Men's parallel bars		=35th
Ernst Wister	Men's parallel bars		37th
Hans Sauter	Men's parallel bars		63rd
Karl Bohusch	Men's parallel bars		68th
Willi Schreyer	Men's parallel bars		74th
Gottfried Hermann	Men's parallel bars		76th
Robert Pranz	Men's parallel bars		107th
Willi Welt	Men's parallel bars		122nd
Ernst Wister	Men's pommel horse		=26th
Karl Bohusch	Men's pommel horse		=30th
Hans Sauter	Men's pommel horse		=36th
Willi Schreyer	Men's pommel horse		=48th
Hans Friedrich	Men's pommel horse		61st
Robert Pranz	Men's pommel horse		=74th
Gottfried Hermann	Men's pommel horse		108th
Ernst Wister	Men's rings		44th
Karl Bohusch	Men's rings		=63th
Willi Schreyer	Men's rings		=83rd
Hans Sauter	Men's rings		86th
Hans Friedrich	Men's rings		89th
Robert Pranz	Men's rings		98th
Gottfried Hermann	Men's rings		117th
Ernst Wister	Men's vault		=18th
Hans Friedrich	Men's vault		=40th
Karl Bohusch	Men's vault		=46th
Willi Schreyer	Men's vault		87th
Hans Sauter	Men's vault		88th
Robert Pranz	Men's vault		112th
Gottfried Hermann	Men's vault		115th
Ernst Wister	Men's floor		=10th
Karl Bohusch	Men's floor		=14th
Hans Friedrich	Men's floor		=29th
Willi Schreyer	Men's floor		=38th
Hans Sauter	Men's floor		=70th
Robert Pranz	Men's floor		=95th
Gottfried Hermann	Men's floor		118th

Two further male team members, Karl Bilas and Leopold Redl, did not start.

Women

Women's team all-around
Gerti Fesl, Gretchen Hehenberger, Gertrude Kolar aka Trude Gollner-Kolar, Edeltraud Schramm, Erika Enzenhofer, Traudl Ruckser, Gertrude Gries aka Gerti Gries, Gertrude Winnige aka Winnige-Barosch - 6th place

A further female team member, Christl Luft, did not start.

== Hockey ==
Head coach:

No.	Pos.	Player	DoB	Age	Caps	Club	Tournament games	Tournament goals
	B	Adam Bischof	13 October 1915	32	?		3	?
	FW	Karl Brandl	2 May 1912	36	?		3	?
		Siegfried Egger			?		0	0
	B	Karl Holzapfel	20 October 1923	24	?		3	?
		Wolfgang Klee			?		0	0
	FW	Johann Koller	3 April 1921	27	?		2	?
	FW	Franz Lovato	28 February 1923	25	?		3	?
	FW	Walter Niederle	17 February 1921	27	?		3	?
	FW	Oskar Nowak	25 March 1913	35	?		3	?
	FW	Karl Ördögh	10 March 1908	40	?		2	?
		Josef Pecanka			?		0	0
	GK	Franz Raule	20 November 1920	27	?		3	?
	HB	Friedrich Rückert	7 July 1920	28	?		3	?
	HB	Franz Strachota	14 October 1918	29	?		2	?
	HB	Ernst Schala	13 July 1916	32	?		3	?

== Rowing ==
Austria had seven male rowers participate in two out of seven rowing events in 1948.

Men's coxless pair

- Gert Watzke
- Kurt Watzke

Men's coxed four

- Erwin Bittmann
- Karl Sitter
- Franz Frauneder
- Theodor Obrietan
- Karl Riedel (cox)

== Sailing ==
Open

Athlete	Event	Race							Net points	Final rank
Athlete	Event	1	2	3	4	5	6	7	Net points	Final rank
Harald Musil	Firefly	20	~~DNF~~	DNF	18	17	19	DNF	499	21
Georg Obermuller; Hans Schachinger; G. Werner; Horst Obermuller	Star	10	~~15~~	14	14	15	8	9	1661	13

== Shooting ==
Three shooters represented Austria in 1948.

Men

Athlete	Event	Final	
Athlete	Event	Score	Rank
Richard Bohslavsky	50 m rifle, prone	575	58
Andreas Krapf	50 m rifle, prone	581	50
Ernst Wöll	50 m rifle, prone	573	60

== Swimming ==
Men

Athlete	Event	Heat		Semifinal		Final	
Athlete	Event	Time	Rank	Time	Rank	Time	Rank
Fritz Zwazl	100 m backstroke	1:13.5	6	Did not advance			
Walter Pavlicek	200 m breaststroke	2:50.6	13 Q	2:50.1	11	Did not advance	

A third competitor, Helmut Koppelstätter in the 100 m backstroke, did not start.

== Weightlifting ==
Bantamweight (56kg)
Johann Josef Vojtech (17th)

Featherweight (60kg)
Anton Richter (11th)

Middleweight (75 kg)
Klement Schuh (16th)

Light-Heavyweight (82.5 kg)
Wilhelm Pankl (13th); Fritz Hala aka Haller (14th)

Heavyweight (+82.5)
Franz Eibler (14th)

== Wrestling ==
Freestyle featherweight
Georg Weidner did not start

Middleweight, Freestyle, Men
Anton Vogel (unplaced)

Greco-Roman bantamweight
Kurt Elias (unplaced)

Greco-Roman featherweight
Georg Weidner (4th)

Greco-Roman welterweight
Josef Schmidt (=4th)

Greco-Roman middleweight
Anton Vogel (unplaced)

Greco-Roman light heavyweight
Peter Enzinger (unplaced)
