= Niederle =

Niederle is a surname. Notable people with the surname include:

- Ivo Niederle, Czech actor, entertainer, and commentator
- Lubor Niederle (1865–1944), Czech archeologist, anthropologist, and ethnographer
- Muriel Niederle (born c. 1970), American economist
- Walter Niederle (born 1921), Austrian field hockey player
