= Krecke =

Krecke or Krecké is a surname. Notable people with the surname include:

- Jeannot Krecké (born 1950), Luxembourgish footballer and politician
- Menn Krecke (1922–1976), Luxembourgish gymnast
