= Viktor Salmhofer =

Austrian canoeist

Viktor Salmhofer (24 July 1909 – 18 April 1988) was an Austrian sprint canoeist who competed in the late 1940s. At the 1948 Summer Olympics in London, paired with Karl Molnar, he finished fourth in the C-2 10000 m event and fifth in the C-2 1000 m event. He was born in Vienna and died in Korneuburg.
