= Gudrun Grömer =

Austrian diver (born 1919)

Personal information
- Nationality: Austrian
- Born: 7 November 1919 Chemnitz, Germany

Sport
- Sport: Diving

Gudrun Grömer (born 7 November 1919, date of death unknown) was an Austrian diver. She competed in two events at the 1948 Summer Olympics. Grömer is deceased.
