= Maria Oberbreyer =

Austrian sprinter (1921–2000)

Personal information
- Nationality: Austrian
- Born: Maria Elisabeth Gabriele Trösch; 19 November 1921 Zwölfaxing, Austria
- Died: 5 November 2000 (aged 78)

Sport
- Sport: Sprinting
- Event: 100 metres

Maria Elisabeth Gabriele Oberbreyer (née Trösch; 19 November 1921 – 5 November 2000) was an Austrian sprinter. She competed in the women's 100 metres at the 1948 Summer Olympics. Oberbreyer died on 5 November 2000, at the age of 78.
