= Karl Brandl =

Austrian hockey player (1912–1976)

Personal information
- Nationality: Austrian
- Born: 2 May 1912
- Died: 23 February 1976 (aged 63)

Sport
- Sport: Field hockey

Karl Brandl (2 May 1912 – 23 February 1976) was an Austrian field hockey player. He competed in the men's tournament at the 1948 Summer Olympics.
