= Karl Holzapfel =

Austrian hockey player

Personal information
- Full name: Karl Johann Holzapfel
- Nationality: Austrian
- Born: 10 October 1923
- Died: 12 August 2009 (aged 85)

Sport
- Sport: Field hockey

Karl Johann Holzapfel (10 October 1923 – 12 August 2009) was an Austrian field hockey player. He competed at the 1948 Summer Olympics and the 1952 Summer Olympics.
