= Ernst Schala =

Austrian field hockey player

Personal information
- Nationality: Austrian
- Born: 13 July 1916
- Died: 26 October 1977 (aged 61)

Sport
- Sport: Field hockey

Ernst Schala (13 July 1916 – 26 October 1977) was an Austrian field hockey player. He competed at the 1948 Summer Olympics and the 1952 Summer Olympics.
