= Franz Raule =

Austrian field hockey player

Personal information
- Nationality: Austrian
- Born: 20 November 1920
- Died: 19 October 2001 (aged 80)

Sport
- Sport: Field hockey

Franz Raule (20 November 1920 – 19 October 2001) was an Austrian field hockey player. He competed at the 1948 Summer Olympics and the 1952 Summer Olympics.
