= Adam Bischof =

Austrian field hockey player (1915–1977)

Personal information
- Full name: Adam Eduard Bischof
- Nationality: Austrian
- Born: 13 March 1915 Vienna, Austria
- Died: 25 August 1977 (aged 62) Vienna, Austria

Sport
- Sport: Field hockey

Adam Eduard Bischof (13 March 1915 – 25 August 1977) was an Austrian field hockey player. He competed in the men's tournament at the 1948 Summer Olympics. Bischof played as a full-back and represented the Währing Wien (Vienna) hockey club domestically. He died in Vienna on 25 August 1977, at the age of 62.
