= Gustav Gerhart =

Austrian footballer (1922–1990)

Personal information
- Date of birth: 4 February 1922
- Date of death: 8 September 1990 (aged 68)

International career
Years	Team	Apps	(Gls)
1945-1949	Austria	4	(0)

Gustav Gerhart (4 February 1922 – 8 September 1990) was an Austrian footballer. He played in four matches for the Austria national football team between 1945 and 1949.
