= Franz Lovato =

Austrian field hockey player

Personal information
- Nationality: Austrian
- Born: 28 February 1923
- Died: 14 September 2018 (aged 95)

Sport
- Sport: Field hockey

Franz Lovato (28 February 1923 – 14 September 2018) was an Austrian field hockey player. He competed in the men's tournament at the 1948 Summer Olympics.
