= Hans Goldschmid =

Austrian cyclist

Personal information
- Born: 6 March 1919 Graz, Austria
- Died: 13 July 1981 (aged 62)

Cycling career
- Sport: Cycling

Hans Goldschmid (6 March 1919 – 13 July 1981) was an Austrian cyclist. He competed in three events at the 1948 Summer Olympics.
