= Czechoslovakia at the 1948 Summer Olympics =

- IOC code: TCH
- NOC: Czechoslovak Olympic Committee

in London, Great Britain 29 July 1948 – 14 August 1948
- Competitors: 87 (73 men and 14 women) in 11 sports
- Flag bearer: Ladislav Trpkoš
- Medals Ranked 8th: Gold 6 Silver 2 Bronze 3 Total 11

Summer Olympics appearances (overview)
- 1920; 1924; 1928; 1932; 1936; 1948; 1952; 1956; 1960; 1964; 1968; 1972; 1976; 1980; 1984; 1988; 1992

Other related appearances
- Bohemia (1900–1912); Czech Republic (1994–pres.); Slovakia (1994–pres.)

Czechoslovakia competed at the 1948 Summer Olympics in London, England. Eighty-seven competitors, 73 men and 14 women, took part in 55 events in 11 sports.

Twenty-six-year-old Emil Zátopek won the gold medal in the 10-kilometre run on the first day (his third race at that distance). On the second day he added a silver medal in the 5 km run. Czechoslovak canoeists were also very successful (gaining three gold and one silver medal), Jan Brzák-Felix successfully defended his medal that he had won 12 years earlier in 1936 Summer Olympics with another partner, Václav Havel and Jiří Pecka won a silver medal using a 12-year-old boat from the 1936 Olympics. Boxer Július Torma won the gold medal in the Welterweight class, although he had injured his left arm before the semi-final. Women's gymnastics team also secured gold medals, but this victory was overshadowed by the death of their teammate Eliška Misáková, who succumbed to polio in London.

== Medalists ==
Medal	Name	Sport	Event	Date
Gold	Emil Zátopek	Athletics	Men's 10,000 metres	30 July
Gold	František Čapek	Canoeing	Men's C-1 10000 m	11 August
Gold	Josef Holeček	Canoeing	Men's C-1 1000 m	12 August
Gold	Jan Brzák-Felix; Bohumil Kudrna	Canoeing	Men's C-2 1000 m	12 August
Gold	Július Torma	Boxing	Men's welterweight	13 August
Gold	Zdeňka Honsová; Marie Kovářová; Miloslava Misáková; Milena Müllerová; Věra Růžičková; Olga Šilhánová; Božena Srncová; Zdeňka Veřmiřovská; Eliška Misáková^{(awarded posthumously)}	Gymnastics	Women's artistic team all-around	14 August
Silver	Emil Zátopek	Athletics	Men's 5000 metres	2 August
Silver	Václav Havel; Jiří Pecka	Canoeing	Men's C-2 10000 m	11 August
Bronze	Zdeněk Růžička	Gymnastics	Men's floor	13 August
Bronze	Zdeněk Růžička	Gymnastics	Men's rings	13 August
Bronze	Leo Sotorník	Gymnastics	Men's vault	13 August

== Fencing ==
Five fencers, all men, represented Czechoslovakia in 1948.

Men's sabre

- Alois Sokol
- Svatopluk Skyva
- Jaroslav Starý

Men's team sabre

- Jindřich Kakos, Svatopluk Skyva, Jaroslav Starý, Alois Sokol, Jindřich Chmela

== Gymnastics ==
The following athletes took part.

Men's all-around

- Zdeněk Růžička
- Pavel Benetka
- Vladimír Karas
- Leo Sotorník
- František Wirth
- Miroslav Málek

Women's all-around

- Zdeňka Honsová
- Miloslava Misáková
- Věra Růžičková
- Božena Srncová
- Milena Müllerová
- Zdeňka Veřmiřovská
- Olga Šilhánová
- Marie Kovářová

== Modern pentathlon ==
Two male pentathletes represented Czechoslovakia in 1948.

- Karel Bártů
- Otto Jemelka

== Rowing ==
Czechoslovakia had four male rowers participate in one out of seven rowing events in 1948.

Men's coxless four

- Václav Roubík
- Josef Kalaš
- Josef Schejbal
- Jiří Vaněk

== Swimming ==
Men

Athlete	Event	Heat		Semifinal		Final	
Athlete	Event	Time	Rank	Time	Rank	Time	Rank
Miroslav Bartůšek	400 m freestyle	4:57.9	12 q	4:58.7	=11	Did not advance	
Miroslav Bartůšek	1500 m freestyle	20:19.4	7 Q	20:32.9	12	Did not advance	
Jiří Kovář	100 m backstroke	1:12.9	3*	Did not advance			
Jiří Linhart	200 m breaststroke	2:53.8	17	Did not advance			

*Rank given is within the heat.
