= Grete Pavlousek =

Austrian sprinter (1923–2015)

Personal information
- Nationality: Austrian
- Born: Margareta Pavlousek; 7 October 1923 Vienna, Austria
- Died: 17 October 2015 (aged 92)

Sport
- Sport: Sprinting
- Event: 100 metres

Margareta Pavlousek (7 October 1923 – 17 October 2015) was an Austrian sprinter. She competed in the women's 100 metres at the 1948 Summer Olympics. Pavlousek died on 17 October 2015, at the age of 92.
