= Leopold Mikolasch =

Austrian footballer (1920–1964)

Personal information
- Date of birth: 17 October 1920
- Date of death: 12 March 1964 (aged 43)

International career
Years	Team	Apps	(Gls)
- Austria

Leopold Mikolasch (17 October 1920 – 12 March 1964) was an Austrian footballer. He competed in the men's tournament at the 1948 Summer Olympics.
