= Wilhelm Lippa =

Austrian diver (1923–1970)

Personal information
- Nationality: Austrian
- Born: 2 May 1923
- Died: 20 January 1970 (aged 46) Vienna, Austria

Sport
- Sport: Diving

Wilhelm Lippa (2 May 1923 – 20 January 1970) was an Austrian diver. He competed in two events at the 1948 Summer Olympics. Lippa died in Vienna on 20 January 1970, at the age of 46.
