= Karl Kowanz =

Austrian footballer (1926–1997)

Personal information
- Date of birth: 15 April 1926
- Date of death: 30 November 1997 (aged 71)
- Position: Defender

Senior career*
Years	Team	Apps	(Gls)
–1950	Admira Wien		
1950–1958	Austria Wien	142	(0)
1958–1961	WAC		

International career
1948–1953	Austria	17	(0)

Managerial career
- 1965–1967: Grazer AK
- 1967–1968: Sturm Graz
- * Club domestic league appearances and goals

Karl Kowanz (15 April 1926 – 30 November 1997) was an Austrian football player and coach. He played for Austria at the 1948 Summer Olympics. Karl Kowanz was the father of the internationally renowned artist Brigitte Kowanz.
