= Josef Pohnetal =

Austrian cyclist

Personal information
- Born: 14 March 1925 Judenburg, Austria
- Died: 17 June 2008 (aged 83) Mistelbach, Austria

Cycling career
- Sport: Cycling

Josef Pohnetal (14 March 1925 – 17 June 2008) was an Austrian cyclist. He competed in three events at the 1948 Summer Olympics.
