= Siegfried Joksch =

Austrian footballer (1917–2006)

Personal information
- Date of birth: 4 July 1917
- Date of death: 29 April 2006 (aged 88)
- Position: Midfielder

Senior career*
Years	Team	Apps	(Gls)
1932–1937	Admira Wien		
1937–1953	Austria Wien	104+	(1+)
1953–1955	FC Zürich		
1955–1959	SC Ortmann		
1959	FK Leopoldstadt		

International career
1945–1950	Austria	22	(0)

Managerial career
- 1961-1964: Kapfenberger SV
- * Club domestic league appearances and goals

Siegfried Joksch (4 July 1917 – 29 April 2006) was an Austrian international footballer. He played for Austria at the 1948 Summer Olympics.
