= Walter Niederle =

Austrian hockey player

Personal information
- Nationality: Austrian
- Born: 17 February 1921
- Died: 28 November 1962

Sport
- Sport: Field hockey

Walter Niederle (17 February 1921 – 28 November 1962) was an Austrian field hockey player. He competed in the men's tournament at the 1948 Summer Olympics.
