= Willi Welt =

Austrian gymnast (born 1926)

- Born: 19 August 1926

Gymnastics career
- Discipline: Men's artistic gymnastics
- Country represented: Austria

Willi Welt (born 19 August 1926) was an Austrian gymnast. He competed at the 1948 Summer Olympics and the 1952 Summer Olympics.
