= Jorge Vidal (gymnast) =

Argentinian gymnast (born c. 1917)

- Full name: Jorge Rodolfo Vidal
- Born: c. 1917

Gymnastics career
- Discipline: Men's artistic gymnastics
- Country represented: Argentina

Jorge Vidal (born c. 1917, date of death unknown) was an Argentine gymnast who competed in the 1948 Summer Olympics. Vidal is deceased.
