= Christian Kipfer =

Swiss gymnast

- Born: 19 December 1921
- Died: 2009 (aged 87–88)

Gymnastics career
- Discipline: Men's artistic gymnastics
- Country represented: Switzerland
Medal record
Men's artistic gymnastics
Representing Switzerland
Olympic Games
Silver medal – second place	1948 London	Team
Bronze medal – third place	1948 London	Parallel bars

Christian Kipfer (19 December 1921 – 2009) was a Swiss gymnast who competed in the 1948 Summer Olympics.
