= Louis Bordo =

American gymnast (1920–2001)

- Full name: Louis John Bordo
- Born: June 2, 1920 Philadelphia, Pennsylvania, U.S.
- Died: February 27, 2001 (aged 80) Philadelphia, Pennsylvania, U.S.

Gymnastics career
- Discipline: Men's artistic gymnastics
- Country represented: United States
- College team: Penn State Nittany Lions (1941–1943)
- Club: South Philadelphia High School
- Head coach: Gene Wettstone
- Retired: c. 1948
Medal record
Men's artistic gymnastics
Representing Penn State Nittany Lions
Event	1st	2nd	3rd
NCAA Championships	0	1	0
Total	0	1	0
NCAA Championships
Silver medal – second place	1942 Annapolis	Team

Louis John Bordo (June 2, 1920 – February 27, 2001) was an American gymnast. He was a member of the United States men's national artistic gymnastics team and competed in eight events at the 1948 Summer Olympics.

== Early life and education ==
Bordo attended South Philadelphia High School and competed for the school's gymnastics team. He graduated high school in 1939 and later enrolled at Pennsylvania State University to pursue gymnastics.

== Gymnastics career ==
As a gymnast, Bordo was a member of the Penn State Nittany Lions men's gymnastics team from 1941 to 1943. He served as team captain for his final season in 1943.

Bordo was inducted into the National Gymnastics Judges Association Hall of Fame in 1979. In 1991, he was inducted to the USA Gymnastics Hall of Fame.

== Personal life ==
Bordo died on February 27, 2001, in Philadelphia of kidney failure.
