= Arturo Amos =

Argentine gymnast (1927–1999)

- Born: March 6, 1927 Temperley, Argentina
- Died: December 29, 1999 (aged 72) Buenos Aires, Argentina

Gymnastics career
- Discipline: Men's artistic gymnastics
- Country represented: Argentina

Arturo Amos (March 6, 1927 – December 29, 1999) was an Argentine gymnast who competed in the 1948 Summer Olympics.
