= József Fekete =

Hungarian gymnast (1923–1987)

- Born: 27 February 1923 Kecskemét, Hungary
- Died: 4 August 1987 (aged 64) Budapest, Hungarian People's Republic

Gymnastics career
- Discipline: Men's artistic gymnastics
- Country represented: Hungary
- Club: Postás Sportegyesület, Budapesti Honvéd Sportegyesület
Medal record
Men's artistic gymnastics
Representing Hungary
Olympic Games
Bronze medal – third place	1948 London	Team

József Fekete (27 February 1923 – 4 August 1987) was a Hungarian gymnast, born in Kecskemét. He competed in gymnastics events at the 1948 Summer Olympics and the 1952 Summer Olympics. He won a bronze medal with the Hungarian team at the 1948 Summer Olympics.
