= Auguste Sirot =

French gymnast

- Full name: Auguste Francisque Sirot
- Born: 29 September 1919 Roanne, France
- Died: 7 April 1994 (aged 74) Roanne, France

Gymnastics career
- Discipline: Men's artistic gymnastics
- Country represented: France

Auguste Francisque Sirot (29 September 1919 – 7 April 1994) was a French gymnast. He competed in eight events at the 1948 Summer Olympics.
