= Vilhelm Møller =

Danish gymnast (1922–2000)

- Born: 20 February 1922 Gjerlev, Denmark
- Died: 13 November 2000 (aged 78) Modesto, California, U.S.

Gymnastics career
- Discipline: Men's artistic gymnastics
- Country represented: Denmark

Vilhelm Møller (20 February 1922 – 13 November 2000) was a Danish gymnast. He competed in eight events at the 1948 Summer Olympics. Møller died in Modesto, California on 13 November 2000, at the age of 78.
