= Gustav Hrubý =

Czech gymnast

- Full name: Augustin Ulrich Hrubý
- Born: 18 April 1916 Vienna, Austria-Hungary

Gymnastics career
- Discipline: Men's artistic gymnastics
- Country represented: Czechoslovakia

Augustin Ulrich "Gustav" Hrubý (born 18 April 1916, date of death unknown) was a Czech gymnast. He competed in eight events at the 1948 Summer Olympics.
