= Jakob Šubelj =

Slovenian gymnast (1922–2003)

- Born: 9 July 1922 Ljubljana, Kingdom of Serbs, Croats and Slovenes
- Died: 1 June 2003 (aged 80) Adelaide, South Australia, Australia

Gymnastics career
- Discipline: Men's artistic gymnastics
- Country represented: Federal People's Republic of Yugoslavia
- Club: Enotnost

Jakob Šubelj (9 July 1922 – 1 June 2003) was a Slovenian gymnast. He competed in eight events at the 1948 Summer Olympics. Šubelj died on 1 June 2003, at the age of 80.
