= Moustafa Abdel-Aal =

Egyptian gymnast

- مصطفى عبد العال
- Born: Cairo, Egypt

Gymnastics career
- Discipline: Men's artistic gymnastics
- Country represented: Egypt

Moustafa Abdel-Aal is an Egyptian gymnast. He competed in the 1948 Summer Olympics.
