= Ahmed Khalil El-Giddawi =

Egyptian gymnast

Ahmed El-Giddawi
- أحمد خليل أحمد الجداوي
- Full name: Ahmed Khalil Ahmed El-Giddawi
- Born: 1931 Cairo, Kingdom of Egypt
- Died: 11 May 2013 (aged 81–82) Cairo, Egypt

Gymnastics career
- Discipline: Men's artistic gymnastics
- Country represented: Egypt
Medal record
Men's artistic gymnastics
Representing Egypt
Mediterranean Games
| Bronze medal – third place | 1955 Barcelona | Team |

Ahmed Khalil Ahmed El-Giddawi (1931 – 11 May 2013) was an Egyptian gymnast. He competed at the 1948 Summer Olympics and the 1952 Summer Olympics.
