= Quinto Vadi =

Italian gymnast

- Born: 13 September 1921 Faenza, Kingdom of Italy
- Died: 17 March 2014 (aged 92) Prato, Italy

Gymnastics career
- Discipline: Men's artistic gymnastics
- Country represented: Italy
- Gym: Società Ginnastica Etruria 1897

Quinto Vadi (13 September 1921 – 17 March 2014) was an Italian gymnast who competed at the 1948 and 1952 Summer Olympics. In 1948 his best individual finish was 13th in the men's pommel horse and his team was ranked 5th among 16 nations in the men's team all-around. In 1952 Italy was 10th among 22 nations in the team exercises and Vadi's best placing was joint 57th in the men's pommel horse. He later served as a teacher, athletics instructor, and trainer with P.G. Libertas. Vadi was born in Faenza and died in Prato, aged 92.
