= Konrad Grilec =

Slovenian gymnast (1909–2002)

- Full name: Konrad Viljem Grilec
- Alternative name: Konrad Grilc
- Born: 25 October 1909 Celje, Austria-Hungary
- Died: 28 April 2002 (aged 92) Ljubljana, Slovenia
- Height: 1.70 m (5 ft 7 in)

Gymnastics career
- Discipline: Men's artistic gymnastics
- Country represented: Yugoslavia
- Club: Sokolsko društvo Celje; Enotnost

Konrad Viljem Grilec (25 October 1909 – 28 April 2002) was a Slovenian gymnast. He competed at the 1936 Summer Olympics and the 1948 Summer Olympics.
