= Mahmoud Abdel-Aal =

Egyptian gymnast (1929–2010)

- محمود عبد العال
- Born: 11 February 1929 Cairo, Kingdom of Egypt
- Died: 4 April 2010 (aged 81) Cairo, Egypt

Gymnastics career
- Discipline: Men's artistic gymnastics
- Country represented: Egypt

Mahmoud Abdel-Aal (11 February 1929 – 4 April 2010) was an Egyptian gymnast. He competed in the 1948 Summer Olympics.
