= Alphonse Anger =

French gymnast

- Full name: Alphonse Eugène Anger
- Born: 20 August 1915 Pfastatt, France
- Died: 22 October 1999 (aged 84) Mulhouse, France

Gymnastics career
- Discipline: Men's artistic gymnastics
- Country represented: France
Medal record
Men's artistic gymnastics
Representing France
World Championships
Bronze medal – third place	1950 Basel	Team

Alphonse Eugène Anger (20 August 1915 – 22 October 1999) was a French gymnast. He competed in eight events at the 1948 Summer Olympics.

== Biography ==
Alphonse Anger was the French champion in the all-around competition in 1943. At the Gymnastics at the 1948 Summer Olympics in London, he came fourth in the team all-around competition. Two years later, at the 1950 Artistic Gymnastics World Championships in Basel, he won the bronze medal in the team all-around competition.
