= Glyn Hopkins =

British gymnast (1928–2023)

- Full name: Glyn T. Hopkins
- Born: 1 October 1928 Pontypridd, Wales
- Died: 23 November 2023 (aged 95) Morriston, Swansea, Wales

Gymnastics career
- Discipline: Men's artistic gymnastics
- Country represented: (United Kingdom) Great Britain

Glyn T. Hopkins (1 October 1928 – 23 November 2023) was a British gymnast. He competed in eight events at the 1948 Summer Olympics. Hopkins died in Swansea on 23 November 2023, at the age of 95.
