= Paavo Aaltonen =

Finnish artistic gymnast (1919–1962)

- Full name: Paavo Johannes Aaltonen
- Born: 11 December 1919 Kemi, Finland
- Died: 9 September 1962 (aged 42) Sipoo, Finland
- Height: 175 cm (5 ft 9 in)

Gymnastics career
- Discipline: Men's artistic gymnastics
- Country represented: Finland
Medal record
Olympic Games
Gold medal – first place	1948 London	Pommel horse
Gold medal – first place	1948 London	Vault
Gold medal – first place	1948 London	Team
Bronze medal – third place	1948 London	All-around
Bronze medal – third place	1952 Helsinki	Team
World Championships
Gold medal – first place	1950 Basel	Horizontal bar
Silver medal – second place	1950 Basel	Team

Paavo Johannes Aaltonen (11 December 1919 – 9 September 1962) was a Finnish artistic gymnast and a three-time Olympic champion. At the 1948 Summer Olympics, he won four medals, of which three were gold, including a three-way tie for gold in the pommel horse with teammates Veikko Huhtanen and Heikki Savolainen. He also competed at the 1952 Summer Olympics, winning a team bronze for a total of five Olympic medals during his career. At the 1950 World Championships, Aaltonen won the gold medal on the horizontal bar and the team silver medal.
