= Emil Studer =

Swiss gymnast

- Born: 11 May 1914 Rorschach, Switzerland

Gymnastics career
- Discipline: Men's artistic gymnastics
- Country represented: Switzerland
Medal record
Men's artistic gymnastics
Representing Switzerland
Olympic Games
Silver medal – second place	1948 London	Team

Emil Studer (born 11 May 1914, date of death unknown) was a Swiss gymnast who competed in the 1948 Summer Olympics.
