= Alejandro Díaz (gymnast) =

Cuban gymnast (1924–2002)

- Full name: Alejandro Díaz Corpión
- Born: 24 November 1924 Havana, Cuba
- Died: 21 October 2002 (aged 77) Caguas, Puerto Rico

Gymnastics career
- Discipline: Men's artistic gymnastics
- Country represented: Cuba

Alejandro Díaz Corpión (24 November 1924 – 21 October 2002) was a Cuban gymnast. He competed in eight events at the 1948 Summer Olympics.
