= Freddy Jensen =

Danish gymnast

- Full name: Josua Frederik Isaias Ananias Jensen
- Born: 28 January 1926 Nuuk, Greenland
- Died: 9 April 1996 (aged 70) Copenhagen, Denmark

Gymnastics career
- Discipline: Men's artistic gymnastics
- Country represented: Denmark

Josua Frederik Isaias Ananias Jensen (28 January 1926 – 9 April 1996) was a Danish gymnast. He competed at the 1948 Summer Olympics and the 1952 Summer Olympics.
