= Dionisio Aguilar =

Mexican gymnast (died 2002)

- Full name: Dionisio Aguilar González
- Died: 2 March 2002 Nuevo León, Mexico

Gymnastics career
- Discipline: Men's artistic gymnastics
- Country represented: Mexico

Dionisio Aguilar González (died 2 March 2002) was a Mexican gymnast. He competed in the 1948 Summer Olympics.
