= Mohamed Roushdi =

Egyptian gymnast

Adli Roushdi
- محمد عدلي رشدى
- Full name: Mohamed Adli Roushdi
- Born: 21 July 1921 Cairo, Sultanate of Egypt
- Died: 28 April 2016 (aged 94) Columbia, South Carolina, US

Gymnastics career
- Discipline: Men's artistic gymnastics
- Country represented: Egypt
- College team: California Golden Bears (1952–1954)
- Head coach: Charles Keeney

Mohamed Adli Roushdi (21 July 1921 – 28 April 2016) was an Egyptian gymnast. He competed in eight events at the 1948 Summer Olympics.
