= Poul Jessen (gymnast) =

Danish gymnast

- Full name: Poul Erik Ravn Jessen
- Born: 17 February 1926 Copenhagen, Denmark
- Died: 16 June 2015 (aged 89)

Gymnastics career
- Discipline: Men's artistic gymnastics
- Country represented: Denmark

Poul Erik Ravn Jessen (17 February 1926 – 16 June 2015) was a Danish gymnast. He competed at the 1948 Summer Olympics and the 1952 Summer Olympics.
