= Volmer Thomsen =

Danish gymnast

- Full name: Volmer Laurits Thomsen
- Born: 31 October 1917 Horsens, Denmark
- Died: 28 October 2000 (aged 82) Viborg, Denmark

Gymnastics career
- Discipline: Men's artistic gymnastics
- Country represented: Denmark

Volmer Laurits Thomsen (31 October 1917 – 28 October 2000) was a Danish gymnast. He competed at the 1948 Summer Olympics and the 1952 Summer Olympics.
