= Sulo Salmi =

Finnish artistic gymnast (1914–1984)

- Full name: Sulo Artur Salmi
- Born: 4 March 1914 Vaasa, Grand Duchy of Finland, Russian Empire
- Died: 29 April 1984 (aged 70) Vaasa, Finland

Gymnastics career
- Discipline: Men's artistic gymnastics
- Country represented: Finland
Medal record
Men's artistic gymnastics
Representing Finland
Olympic Games
Gold medal – first place	1948 London	Team

Sulo Artur Salmi (4 March 1914 – 29 April 1984) was a Finnish gymnast who competed in the 1948 Summer Olympics.
