= Georges Wengler =

Luxembourgish gymnast (1918–2004)

- Born: 14 November 1918 Luxembourg City, Luxembourg
- Died: 17 May 2004 (aged 85) Luxembourg City, Luxembourg

Gymnastics career
- Discipline: Men's artistic gymnastics
- Country represented: Luxembourg

Georges "Butz" Wengler (14 November 1918 – 17 May 2004) was a Luxembourgish gymnast. He competed in eight events at the 1948 Summer Olympics.
