= Karel Janež =

Slovenian gymnast (1914–2006)

- Born: 22 January 1914 Ljubljana, Austria-Hungary
- Died: April 2006 (aged 92)

Gymnastics career
- Discipline: Men's artistic gymnastics
- Country represented: Yugoslavia
- Club: Enotnost

Karel Janež (22 January 1914 – April 2006) was a Slovenian gymnast. He competed at the 1948 Summer Olympics and the 1952 Summer Olympics.
