= René Schroeder =

Luxembourgish gymnast (1920–2001)

- Born: 23 December 1920 Esch-sur-Alzette, Luxembourg
- Died: 10 February 2001 (aged 80) Esch-sur-Alzette, Luxembourg

Gymnastics career
- Discipline: Men's artistic gymnastics
- Country represented: Luxembourg

René Schroeder (23 December 1920 – 10 February 2001) was a Luxembourgish gymnast. He competed at the 1948 Summer Olympics and the 1952 Summer Olympics.
