= Everardo Rios =

Mexican gymnast (born 1915)

- Full name: Everardo Rios Peña
- Born: 12 May 1915 Los Aldamas, Mexico

Gymnastics career
- Discipline: Men's artistic gymnastics
- Country represented: Mexico

Everardo Rios Peña (born 12 May 1915, date of death unknown) was a Mexican gymnast. He competed in eight events at the 1948 Summer Olympics.
