= Lajos Tóth (gymnast) =

Hungarian gymnast (1914–1984)

- Born: 25 August 1914 Debrecen, Austria-Hungary
- Died: 24 August 1984 (aged 69) Debrecen, People's Republic of Hungary

Gymnastics career
- Discipline: Men's artistic gymnastics
- Country represented: Hungary
- Club: Debreceni Torna Egylet, Debreceni Postás Sport Egyesület
Medal record
Men's artistic gymnastics
Representing Hungary
Olympic Games
| Bronze medal – third place | 1948 London | Team |

Lajos Tóth (25 August 1914 – 24 August 1984) was a Hungarian gymnast, born in Debrecen. He competed in gymnastics events at the 1936 Summer Olympics, 1948 Summer Olympics, and the 1952 Summer Olympics. He won a bronze medal with the Hungarian team at the 1948 Summer Olympics.
