= Ivor Vice =

British gymnast (1929–2005)

- Full name: Ivor Joseph Vice
- Born: 23 July 1929 Swansea, Wales
- Died: 22 September 2005 (aged 76) Swansea, Wales

Gymnastics career
- Discipline: Men's artistic gymnastics
- Country represented: (United Kingdom) Great Britain

Ivor Joseph Vice (23 July 1929 – 22 September 2005) was a British gymnast. He competed in eight events at the 1948 Summer Olympics.
