= Miro Longyka =

Slovenian gymnast (1913–2008)

- Born: 22 March 1913 Ljubljana, Austria-Hungary
- Died: 20 February 2008 (aged 94) Ljubljana, Slovenia

Gymnastics career
- Discipline: Men's artistic gymnastics
- Country represented: Yugoslavia
- Club: Enotnost

Miro Longyka (22 March 1913 – 20 February 2008) was a Slovenian gymnast. He competed in eight events at the 1948 Summer Olympics.
