= Danilo Fioravanti =

Italian gymnast

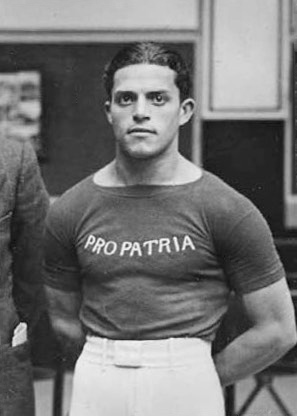

Personal information
- Born: 23 August 1913 Berra, Kingdom of Italy
- Died: 4 May 2007 (aged 93) Vigevano, Italy

Gymnastics career
- Discipline: Men's artistic gymnastics
- Country represented: Italy
- Gym: Gruppo Sportivo "Maurizio Marconi" Vigili del Fuoco

Danilo Fioravanti (23 August 1913 – 4 May 1997) was an Italian gymnast. He competed at the 1936 and 1948 Olympics and finished in fifth place with the Italian team. His best individual result was 12th place on the vault in 1936.
