= Stjepan Boltižar =

Croatian gymnast (1913–1989)

- Стјепан Болтижар
- Born: 1 August 1913 Varaždin, Austria-Hungary
- Died: 30 November 1989 (aged 76) Zagreb, Yugoslavia

Gymnastics career
- Discipline: Men's artistic gymnastics
- Country represented: (Socialist Federal Republic of Yugoslavia) Yugoslavia

Stjepan Boltižar (1 August 1913 – 30 November 1989) was a Croatian gymnast. He competed in eight events at the 1948 Summer Olympics.
