= Børge Minerth =

Danish gymnast

- Full name: Børge Ernst Minerth
- Born: 2 April 1920 Copenhagen, Denmark
- Died: 19 March 1980 (aged 59) Copenhagen, Denmark

Gymnastics career
- Discipline: Men's artistic gymnastics
- Country represented: Denmark

Børge Ernst Minerth (2 April 1920 – 19 March 1980) was a Danish gymnast. He competed at the 1948 Summer Olympics and the 1952 Summer Olympics.
