= Domenico Grosso =

Italian gymnast

- Born: 15 June 1922 Legnano, Kingdom of Italy
- Died: 13 August 2005 (aged 83) Castellanza, Italy

Gymnastics career
- Discipline: Men's artistic gymnastics
- Country represented: Italy
- Gym: Ginnastica Perseverant ASD

Domenico Grosso (15 June 1922 – 13 August 2005) was an Italian gymnast. He competed in eight events at the 1948 Summer Olympics.
