= Polo Welfring =

Luxembourgish gymnast (1926–1993)

- Full name: Pierre Welfring
- Born: 10 April 1926 Esch-sur-Alzette, Luxembourg
- Died: 28 January 1993 (aged 66)

Gymnastics career
- Discipline: Men's artistic gymnastics
- Country represented: Luxembourg

Pierre "Polo" Welfring (10 April 1926 – 28 January 1993) was a Luxembourgish gymnast. He competed in eight events at the 1948 Summer Olympics.
