= Arnold Thomsen =

Danish gymnast (1913–2001)

- Full name: Arnold Sigfred Thomsen
- Born: 31 May 1913 Esbjerg, Denmark
- Died: 8 June 2001 (aged 88) Esbjerg, Denmark

Gymnastics career
- Discipline: Men's artistic gymnastics
- Country represented: Denmark

Arnold Sigfred Thomsen (31 May 1913 – 8 June 2001) was a Danish gymnast. He competed in eight events at the 1948 Summer Olympics.
