= Alec Wales =

British gymnast (1916–1975)

- Full name: Albert Thomas Wales
- Born: 4 December 1916 Stepney, England
- Died: 1975 (aged 58–59) Wrexham, Wales

Gymnastics career
- Discipline: Men's artistic gymnastics
- Country represented: (United Kingdom) Great Britain

Albert Thomas "Alec" Wales (4 December 1916 – 1975) was a British gymnast. He competed in eight events at the 1948 Summer Olympics.
