= Jos Bernard =

Luxembourgish gymnast (1924–2020)

- Born: 26 April 1924 Cologne, Weimar Republic
- Died: 26 January 2020 (aged 95)

Gymnastics career
- Discipline: Men's artistic gymnastics
- Country represented: Luxembourg

Jos Bernard (26 April 1924 – 26 January 2020) was a Luxembourgish gymnast who competed in the 1948 Summer Olympics. He was born in Cologne in April 1924 and died in January 2020 at the age of 95.
