= Lajos Sántha =

Hungarian gymnast (1915–1992)

- Born: 13 July 1915 Csorvás, Austria-Hungary
- Died: 21 June 1992 (aged 76) Budapest, Hungary

Gymnastics career
- Discipline: Men's artistic gymnastics
- Country represented: Hungary
- Club: Postás Sportegyesület
Medal record
Men's artistic gymnastics
Representing Hungary
Olympic Games
Bronze medal – third place	1948 London	Team

Lajos Sántha (13 July 1915 – 21 June 1992) was a Hungarian gymnast, born in Csorvás. He competed in gymnastics events at the 1948 Summer Olympics and the 1952 Summer Olympics. He won a bronze medal with the Hungarian team at the 1948 Summer Olympics.
