= Egidio Armelloni =

Italian gymnast

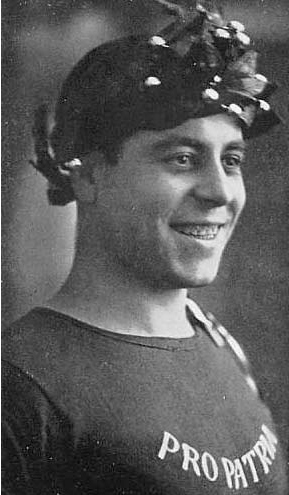
- Armelloni c. 1930

Personal information
- Full name: Egidio Luigi Secondo Armelloni
- Born: 22 July 1909 Soresina, Kingdom of Italy
- Died: 4 May 1997 (aged 87) Milan, Italy

Gymnastics career
- Discipline: Men's artistic gymnastics
- Country represented: Italy
- Club: Pro Patria Milano

Egidio Luigi Secondo Armelloni (22 July 1909 – 4 May 1997) was an Italian gymnast. He competed at the 1936 and 1948 Olympics and finished in fifth place with the Italian team. His best individual result was 11th place on the pommel horse in 1936.

In 1929 Armelloni joined the military. Next year he was arrested for alleged communist propaganda activities among the military and in industrial plants. He was sentenced to two years in November 1931 and released on 28 October 1932 by an amnesty. As a result, he missed the 1932 Olympics while being a member of the national gymnastics team. Upon release he was asked to sign a letter denying his activities. He refused, and thus was also removed from the 1936 Olympic team. He was reinstated only by interference of Giorgio Vaccaro, Secretary-General of Italian Olympic Committee. After retiring from competitions Armelloni had a long career as gymnastics coach.
