= Percy May (gymnast) =

British gymnast (1927–1977)

- Full name: Percy Mckay May
- Born: 6 October 1927 Swansea, Wales
- Died: 16 October 1977 (aged 50) Swansea, Wales

Gymnastics career
- Discipline: Men's artistic gymnastics
- Country represented: (United Kingdom) Great Britain

Percy Mckay May (6 October 1927 – 16 October 1977) was a British gymnast. He competed in eight events at the 1948 Summer Olympics. May was a member of the Swansea YMCA gymnastics club, which won the British men's championship teams competition seven times between 1947 and 1954.
