= Drago Jelić =

Yugoslav gymnast (1914–1990)

- Full name: Dragutin Jelić
- Born: 16 November 1914
- Died: 11 December 1990 (aged 76) Durban, South Africa
- Relatives: Ivica Jelić (brother)

Gymnastics career
- Discipline: Men's artistic gymnastics
- Country represented: (Socialist Federal Republic of Yugoslavia) Yugoslavia

Dragutin Jelić (16 November 1914 – 11 December 1990) was a Croatian gymnast who competed for Yugoslavia. He competed in eight events at the 1948 Summer Olympics.
