= Antoine Schlindwein =

French gymnast (1911–1995)

- Full name: Antoine Pierre Schlindwein
- Born: 10 August 1911 Sarreguemines, France
- Died: 24 September 1995 (aged 84) Sarreguemines, France

Gymnastics career
- Discipline: Men's artistic gymnastics
- Country represented: France

Antoine Pierre Schlindwein (10 August 1911 – 24 September 1995) was a French gymnast. He competed at the 1936 Summer Olympics and the 1948 Summer Olympics.
