= Josip Kujundžić =

Yugoslav gymnast

- Јосип Кујунџић
- Born: 18 April 1915 Subotica, Austria-Hungary
- Died: 19 April 1994 (aged 79) Subotica, Yugoslavia

Gymnastics career
- Discipline: Men's artistic gymnastics
- Country represented: Yugoslavia
- Club: Gimnastičkog društva Partizan

Josip Kujundžić (18 April 1915 – 19 April 1994) was a Yugoslav gymnast. He competed in eight events at the 1948 Summer Olympics.
