= Robert Lucy =

Swiss gymnast (1923–2009)

- Born: 20 February 1923
- Died: 23 December 2009 (aged 86)

Gymnastics career
- Discipline: Men's artistic gymnastics
- Country represented: Switzerland
- Gym: BTV Bern
Medal record
Men's artistic gymnastics
Representing Switzerland
Olympic Games
Silver medal – second place	1948 London	Team

Robert Lucy (20 February 1923 – 23 December 2009) was a Swiss gymnast. He took part in the 1948 Olympics, where he was part of the Swiss team that won silver in the team competition. He won no individual medals, but finished 14th on the mat, and 16th on the pommel horse for his best positions. Overall, he finished 15th. Lucy died on 23 December 2009 of old age.
