= Jorge Castro (gymnast) =

Mexican gymnast (1919–2011)

- Full name: Jorge Armando Paulino Castro Valdés
- Born: 22 June 1919 Mexico City, Mexico
- Died: 5 August 2011 (aged 92) Mexico City, Mexico

Gymnastics career
- Discipline: Men's artistic gymnastics
- Country represented: Mexico

Jorge Armando Paulino Castro Valdés (22 June 1919 – 5 August 2011) was a Mexican gymnast. He competed in eight events at the 1948 Summer Olympics.
