= Győző Mogyorossy =

Hungarian gymnast (1914–1981)

Győző Mogyoróssy
- Full name: Győző István Mogyoróssy
- Born: 23 December 1914 Debrecen, Austria-Hungary
- Died: 20 December 1981 (aged 66) Budapest, Hungarian People's Republic
- Relatives: János Mogyorósi-Klencs (cousin)

Gymnastics career
- Discipline: Men's artistic gymnastics
- Country represented: Hungary
- Club: Debreceni Torna Egylet, Testnevelési Főiskola Sport Egylet
Medal record
Men's artistic gymnastics
Representing Hungary
Olympic Games
Bronze medal – third place	1948 London	Team

Győző István Mogyoróssy (23 December 1914 – 20 December 1981) was a Hungarian gymnast, born in Debrecen. He competed in gymnastics events at the 1936 Summer Olympics and the 1948 Summer Olympics. He won a bronze medal with the Hungarian team at the 1948 Summer Olympics.
