= Jack Flaherty (gymnast) =

British gymnast (1908–1980)

- Full name: John Flaherty
- Born: 21 September 1908 Manchester, England
- Died: 10 May 1980 (aged 71) Stockport, England

Gymnastics career
- Discipline: Men's artistic gymnastics
- Country represented: (United Kingdom) Great Britain

John Flaherty (21 September 1908 – 10 May 1980) was a British gymnast. He competed in eight events at the 1948 Summer Olympics.
