= Gunner Olesen =

Danish gymnast (1916–1979)

- Full name: Gunner Rønnow Olesen
- Born: 22 December 1916 Slagelse, Denmark
- Died: 24 February 1979 (aged 62) Slagelse, Denmark

Gymnastics career
- Discipline: Men's artistic gymnastics
- Country represented: Denmark

Gunner Rønnow Olesen (22 December 1916 – 24 February 1979) was a Danish gymnast. He competed in eight events at the 1948 Summer Olympics.
