= Ferenc Várkõi =

Hungarian gymnast (1916–1987)

Ferenc Várkői
- Born: 27 January 1916 Csongrád, Austria-Hungary
- Died: 22 November 1987 (aged 71) Pécs, Hungarian People's Republic

Gymnastics career
- Discipline: Men's artistic gymnastics
- Country represented: Hungary
- Club: Pécsi Börgyár Torna Club
Medal record
Men's artistic gymnastics
Representing Hungary
Olympic Games
Bronze medal – third place	1948 London	Team

Ferenc Várkői (27 January 1916 – 22 November 1987) was a Hungarian gymnast, born in Csongrád. He competed in gymnastics events at the 1948 Summer Olympics. He won a bronze medal with the Hungarian team at the 1948 Summer Olympics.
