= Elkana Grønne =

Danish gymnast

- Full name: Tage Elkana Grønne
- Born: 24 February 1925 Esbjerg, Denmark
- Died: 23 December 2001 (aged 76) Sorø, Denmark

Gymnastics career
- Discipline: Men's artistic gymnastics
- Country represented: Denmark

Tage Elkana Grønne (24 February 1925 – 23 December 2001) was a Danish gymnast. He competed in eight events at the 1948 Summer Olympics.
