= Ettore Perego =

Italian gymnast (1913–2013)

- Born: 11 April 1913 Monza, Kingdom of Italy
- Died: 23 October 2013 (aged 100) Sesto San Giovanni, Italy

Gymnastics career
- Discipline: Men's artistic gymnastics
- Country represented: Italy
- Club: Società Ginnastica Pro Lissone

Ettore Perego (11 April 1913 – 23 October 2013) was an Italian gymnast who competed at the 1948 Summer Olympics, where his best individual finish was 12th in the men's pommel horse while his team was ranked 5th among 16 nations in the men's team all-around. Born in Monza and competing out of Pro Lissone, he was an Italian national champion prior to the Games and later, until his 1978 retirement, worked as a gymnastics coach with Pro Lissone. He turned 100 in April 2013 and died in Sesto San Giovanni in October 2013.
