= Pierre Schmitz =

Luxembourgish gymnast (1920–2004)

- Born: 16 May 1920 Differdange, Luxembourg
- Died: 7 December 2004 (aged 84) Niederkorn, Luxembourg

Gymnastics career
- Discipline: Men's artistic gymnastics
- Country represented: Luxembourg

Pierre Schmitz (16 May 1920 – 7 December 2004) was a Luxembourgish gymnast. He competed in eight events at the 1948 Summer Olympics.
