= Ali Zaky =

Egyptian gymnast

- علي زكي عطية
- Full name: Ali Zaky Attia
- Born: 1930 Alexandria, Kingdom of Egypt
- Died: 12 March 2005 (aged 74–75) Giza, Egypt

Gymnastics career
- Discipline: Men's artistic gymnastics
- Country represented: Egypt
Medal record
Men's artistic gymnastics
Event	1st	2nd	3rd
Mediterranean Games	4	6	8
Total	4	6	8
Representing Egypt
Mediterranean Games
Gold medal – first place	1951 Alexandria	Team vault
Gold medal – first place	1951 Alexandria	Vault
Gold medal – first place	1951 Alexandria	Parallel bars
Gold medal – first place	1951 Alexandria	Horizontal bar
Silver medal – second place	1951 Alexandria	Team floor
Silver medal – second place	1951 Alexandria	Team rings
Silver medal – second place	1951 Alexandria	Team parallel bars
Silver medal – second place	1951 Alexandria	Rings
Silver medal – second place	1955 Barcelona	Vault
Silver medal – second place	1955 Barcelona	Parallel bars
Bronze medal – third place	1951 Alexandria	Team all-around
Bronze medal – third place	1951 Alexandria	Team pommel horse
Bronze medal – third place	1951 Alexandria	Team horizontal bar
Bronze medal – third place	1951 Alexandria	All-around
Bronze medal – third place	1955 Barcelona	Team
Bronze medal – third place	1955 Barcelona	All-around
Bronze medal – third place	1955 Barcelona	Floor
Bronze medal – third place	1955 Barcelona	Horizontal bar

Ali Zaky Attia (1930 – 12 March 2005) was an Egyptian gymnast. He competed at the 1948 Summer Olympics and the 1952 Summer Olympics.
