= Veikko Huhtanen =

Finnish artistic gymnast

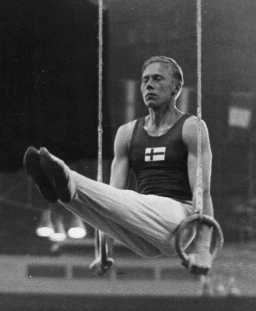

Personal information
- Born: 5 June 1919 Viipuri, Finland
- Died: 29 January 1976 (aged 56)

Gymnastics career
- Discipline: Men's artistic gymnastics
- Country represented: Finland
Medal record
Representing Finland
Olympic Games
Gold medal – first place	1948 London	All-around
Gold medal – first place	1948 London	Pommel horse
Gold medal – first place	1948 London	Team all-around
Silver medal – second place	1948 London	Parallel bars
Bronze medal – third place	1948 London	Horizontal bar
World Championships
Silver medal – second place	1950 Basel	Horizontal bar
Silver medal – second place	1950 Basel	Team all-around

Veikko Aarne Aleks Huhtanen (5 June 1919 – 29 January 1976) was a Finnish artistic gymnast. He was the most successful gymnast at the 1948 Summer Olympics, taking home five medals, including three gold medals. In the pommel horse event, Huhtanen and two other Finns, Heikki Savolainen and Paavo Aaltonen, had the same score, and the gold medal was shared among the three.

Huhtanen won two silver medals at the 1950 World Championships, in horizontal bar and with a team. Domestically, he won only one individual title, in horizontal bar in 1948. Huhtanen retired after failing to qualify for the 1952 Olympics. He later worked as a machine operator in a factory and remained involved with gymnastics as a referee.
