= Ivica Jelić (gymnast) =

Yugoslav gymnast (1917–1989)

- Full name: Ivan Jelić
- Born: 28 September 1917
- Died: 17 April 1989 (aged 71) Zagreb, Yugoslavia
- Relatives: Drago Jelić (brother)

Gymnastics career
- Discipline: Men's artistic gymnastics
- Country represented: Yugoslavia
- Club: Dinamo Zagreb

Ivan "Ivica" Jelić (28 September 1917 – 17 April 1989) was a Yugoslav gymnast. He competed at the 1948 Summer Olympics and the 1952 Summer Olympics.
