= Menn Krecke =

Luxembourgish gymnast (1922–1976)

- Full name: Joseph Krecke
- Born: 20 December 1922 Neudorf-Weimershof, Luxembourg
- Died: 29 July 1976 (aged 53) Luxembourg City, Luxembourg
- Height: 1.74 m (5 ft 9 in)

Gymnastics career
- Discipline: Men's artistic gymnastics
- Country represented: Luxembourg

Joseph "Menn" Krecke (20 December 1922 – 29 July 1976) was a Luxembourgish gymnast. He competed in eight events at the 1948 Summer Olympics.
