= Willi Schreyer =

Austrian gymnast (1914–2002)

- Full name: Wilhelm Paul Moritz Schreyer
- Alternative name: Walter Schreyer
- Born: 9 September 1914 Salzburg, Austria-Hungary
- Died: 2 May 2002 (aged 87) Salzburg, Austria

Gymnastics career
- Discipline: Men's artistic gymnastics
- Country represented: Austria

Wilhelm Paul Moritz Schreyer (9 September 1914 – 2 May 2002) was an Austrian gymnast. He competed in eight events at the 1948 Summer Olympics.
