= Miroslav Málek =

Czech gymnast

- Born: 30 November 1915 Prague, Austria-Hungary
- Died: 30 November 1995 (aged 80)

Gymnastics career
- Discipline: Men's artistic gymnastics
- Country represented: Czechoslovakia

Miroslav Málek (30 November 1915 – 30 November 1995) was a Czech gymnast. He competed in eight events at the 1948 Summer Olympics.
