= Karl Bohusch =

Austrian gymnast (1916–1962)

- Full name: Karl Ludwig Bohusch
- Born: 18 May 1916 Vienna, Austria-Hungary
- Died: 31 May 1962 (aged 46) Vienna, Austria

Gymnastics career
- Discipline: Men's artistic gymnastics
- Country represented: Austria

Karl Ludwig Bohusch (18 May 1916 – 31 May 1962) was an Austrian gymnast. He competed in eight events at the 1948 Summer Olympics.
