= Hans Sauter =

Austrian gymnast (1925–2014)

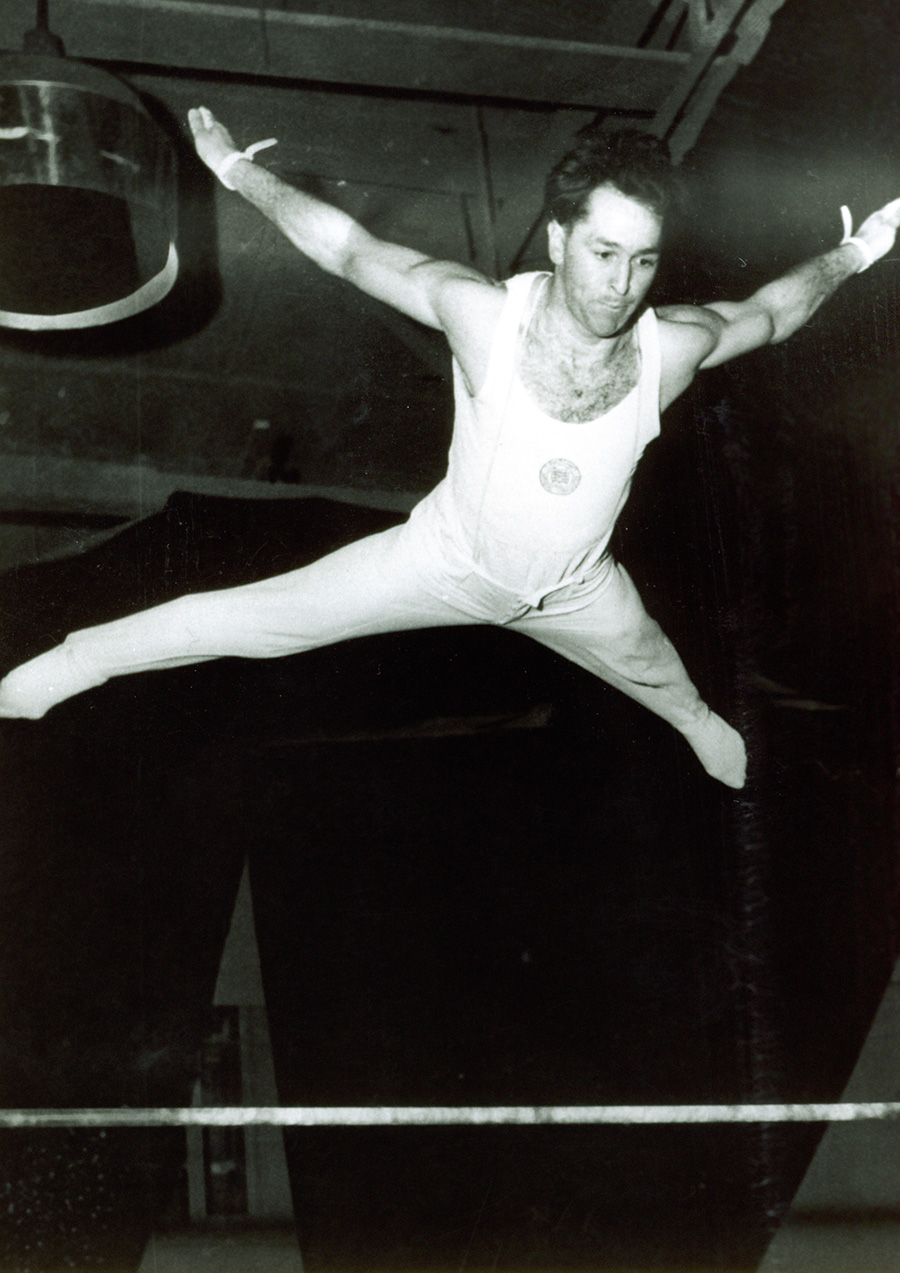
- Sauter in 1959

Personal information
- Alternative name: Johann Sauter
- Born: 6 June 1925 Bregenz, Austria
- Died: 1 October 2014 (aged 89)

Gymnastics career
- Discipline: Men's artistic gymnastics
- Country represented: Austria
Medal record
Representing Austria
European Championships
Bronze medal – third place	1955 Frankfurt	Pommel horse

Hans Sauter (6 June 1925 – 1 October 2014) was an Austrian gymnast. He competed at the 1948, 1952, 1956 and the 1960 Summer Olympics.
