= Hans Friedrich =

Austrian gymnast (1924–1977)

- Born: 9 February 1924
- Died: 6 July 1977 (aged 53)

Gymnastics career
- Discipline: Men's artistic gymnastics
- Country represented: Austria

Hans Friedrich (9 February 1924 – 6 July 1977) was an Austrian gymnast. He competed at the 1948 Summer Olympics and the 1952 Summer Olympics. Friedrich died on 6 July 1977, at the age of 53.
