= Ernst Wister =

Austrian gymnast (1922–1990)

- Full name: Ernst Valentin Wister
- Born: 11 June 1922 Graz, Austria
- Died: 4 July 1990 (aged 68) Graz, Austria

Gymnastics career
- Discipline: Men's artistic gymnastics
- Country represented: Austria

Ernst Valentin Wister (11 June 1922 – 4 July 1990) was an Austrian gymnast. He competed at the 1948 Summer Olympics and the 1952 Summer Olympics.

Wister died in Graz on 4 July 1990, at the age of 68.
