= Robert Pranz =

Austrian gymnast

- Born: 22 October 1904
- Died: 1 October 1981 (aged 76)

Gymnastics career
- Discipline: Men's artistic gymnastics
- Country represented: Austria

Robert Pranz (22 October 1904 – 1 October 1981) was an Austrian gymnast. He competed at the 1936 Summer Olympics and the 1948 Summer Olympics.
