= Vladimír Karas =

Czech gymnast

- Born: 22 May 1927 Prague, Czechoslovakia
- Died: 19 June 2003 (aged 76)

Gymnastics career
- Discipline: Men's artistic gymnastics
- Country represented: Czechoslovakia

Vladimír Karas (22 May 1927 – 19 June 2003) was a Czech gymnast. He competed in eight events at the 1948 Summer Olympics.
