= František Wirth =

Czech gymnast

- Born: 7 March 1915 Prague, Austria-Hungary
- Died: 1 June 2003 (aged 88)

Gymnastics career
- Discipline: Men's artistic gymnastics
- Country represented: Czechoslovakia

František Wirth (7 March 1915 – 1 June 2003) was a Czech gymnast. He competed in eight events at the 1948 Summer Olympics.
