= Gymnastics at the Pan American Games – Men's team all-around =

Men's events at the Gymnastics at the Pan American Games were first held at the 1951 Pan American Games.

Three medals are awarded: gold for first place, silver for second place, and bronze for third place. Tie breakers have not been used in every year.

== Medalists ==
Games	Location	Gold	Silver	Bronze
1951	(Argentina) Buenos Aires	Argentina; Mario Fizbein; Ovidio Ferrari; César Bonoris; Jorge Soler; Enrique Rapesta; Pedro Lonchibuco; Juan Caviglia; Roberto Núñez	Cuba; José Vazquez; Raimundo Rey; Francisco Cascante; Baldomero Rubiera; Roberto Villacián; Fernando Lecuona; Ángel Aguiar; Rafael Lecuona	Mexico; José Savignon; Manuel Ortiz; Carlos Duarte; José Rosellón; Rubén Lira; Guillermo Yáñez; Manuel Guzmán; Everardo Rios
1955	Mexico City	United States; Jack Beckner; Joe Kotys; Jack Miles; Abie Grossfeld; Don Holder; Dick Beckner	Cuba; Rafael Lecuona; Luis Santana; Francisco Cascante; Baldomero Rubiera; Ángel Franco; Roberto Villacián	Argentina; Juan Caviglia; Ovidio Ferrari; César Bonoris; Enrique Rapesta; Joaquín Zbikowski; Jaroslav Slanina
1959	(United States) Chicago	United States; Jack Beckner; Don Tonry; Gregor Weiss; Abie Grossfeld; Gar O'Quinn; Jamile Ashmore	Canada; Richard Montpetit; Carl Girard; Hans Gerbig; Dieter Weichort; Nino Marion; William Vennels	Argentina; Juan Caviglia; Ricardo Licenziato; César Bonoris; Martín Carranza; Bautista di Giacomo; José Flecha
1963	(Brazil) São Paulo	United States; Jay Warner; Don Tonry; Fred Orlofsky; Abie Grossfeld; Gar O'Quinn; Jamile Ashmore	Canada; Richard Montpetit; Wilhelm Weiler; Roger Dion; Ivan Boisclair; Nino Marion	Cuba; Octavio Suárez; Héctor Ramírez; Andrés González; Félix Padrón; Luis de Pablo; Juan Pizarro
1967	(Canada) Winnipeg	United States; Fred Roethlisberger; Dave Thor; Mark Cohn; Arno Lascari; Robert Emery; Richard Lloyd	Cuba; Héctor Ramírez; Octavio Suárez; Jorge Rodríguez; Andrés González; Pablo Hernández; Carlos Garcia	Mexico; Armando Valles; Armando Garcia; Fernando Valles; Rogelio Mendoza; Enrique García; Enrique Salazar
1971	(Colombia) Cali	Cuba; Jorge Rodríguez; Jorge Cuervo; Emilio Sagre; René Badell; Miguel García; Luis Ramirez	United States; Gary Anderson; David Butzman; John Crosby; John Ellas; Thomas Lindner; Brent Simmons	Canada; Sidney Jensen; Andre Simard; Steplien Mitruk; Ivan Boisclair; Richard Bigras; Ronald Hunter
1975	Mexico City	United States; Marshall Avener; Bart Conner; Peter Kormann; Kurt Thomas; Glenn Tidwell; Gene Whelan	Cuba; Jorge Cuervo; Roberto Richard; Jorge Rodríguez; José Tejeda; Jorge Roche; Roberto Arego	Mexico; Fernando Decena; Rogelio Mendoza; Gerardo Araujo; Luis Garcia; José Sosa; José Vilchis
1979	(Puerto Rico) San Juan	Cuba; Casimiro Suárez; Jorge Roche; Enrique Bravo; Roberto Richard; Adolfo Fernández; Mario Castro	Canada; Warren Long; Joan Choquette; Mark Epprecht; Nigel Rothwell; Pierre Clavel; Owen Walstrom	Brazil; Helio de Araújo; João Ribeiro; Reinaldo Ferreira; Mario Albuquerque; Altair Rodrigues; João Tavares
1983	(Venezuela) Caracas	Cuba; Casimiro Suárez; Israel Sanchez; Roberto Richard; Jesús Rivera; Lázaro Amador; Mario Castro	United States; Brian Babcock; Tom Beach; Mark Caso; Billy Paul; Mario McCutcheon; Joey Ray	Canada; David Arnold; Yves Dion; Marshall Garfield; Curtis Hibbert; Guy Lemelin; James Rozon
1987	(United States) Indianapolis	United States; Tim Daggett; Kevin Davis; Brian Ginsberg; Scott Johnson; Charles Lakes; Tom Schlesinger	Cuba; Casimiro Suárez; Félix Aguillera; Lázaro Amador; Luis Cartaya; José Fraga; Jesús Rivera	Brazil; Gerson Gnoatto; Guilherme Pinto; Carlo Sabino; Carlos Fulcher; Marco Monteiro; Ricardo Nassar
1991	(Cuba) Havana	Cuba; Casimiro Suárez; Erick López; José Tejeda; Félix Aguillera; Raúl Menéndez; Damián Meriño	United States; Trent Dimas; Jeff Lutz; Dominick Minicucci; Bob Stelter; Mike Racanelli; Mark Warburton	Mexico; Alejandro Peniche; Luis Lopez; Francisco Lopez; Andrés Sanchez; Oscar Figueroa; Licurgo Díaz
1995	(Argentina) Mar del Plata	United States; Mihai Bagiu; Stephen McCain; John Roethlisberger; Bill Roth; Kip Simons; Chainey Umphrey; Chris Waller	Cuba; Erick López; Lázaro Lamelas; Abel Driggs; Félix Aguillera; Damián Meriño; Francisco Díaz; Yoel Gutiérrez	Canada; Kris Burley; Peter Schmidt; Travis Romagnoli; Alan Nolet; Jason Papp; Jason Hardabura; Richard Ikeda
1999	(Canada) Winnipeg	Cuba; Yoandry Diaz; Erick López; Lázaro Lamelas; Adonis Vázquez; Francisco Dias; Abel Driggs	United States; Michael Ashe; Raj Bhavsar; Michael Dutka; Stephen McCain; Michael Moran; James Young	Canada; Darin Good; Richard Ikeda; Alexander Jeltkov; Kris Burley; Roshawn Amendra; Grant Golding
2003	(Dominican Republic) Santo Domingo	Cuba; Erick López; Charles León Tamayo; Abel Driggs; Michael Brito; Lazaro Lamelas; Yoslani Mendoza	Brazil; Danilo Nogueira; Diego Hypólito; Michel Conceição; Mosiah Rodrigues; Victor Rosa; Vitor Camargo	United States; David Durante; Daniel Gill; Jonathan Horton; Sho Nakamori; David Sender; Clayton Strother
2007	(Brazil) Rio de Janeiro	Puerto Rico; Rafael Morales Castado; Reinaldo Oquendo; Tommy Ramos; Luis Rivera; Alexander Rodríguez; Luis Vargas	Brazil; Luiz Anjos; Diego Hypólito; Danilo Nogueira; Mosiah Rodrigues; Victor Rosa; Adan Santos	United States; Guillermo Alvarez; David Durante; Sean Golden; Joseph Hagerty; Justin Spring; Todd Thornton
2011	(Mexico) Guadalajara	Brazil; Francisco Barretto Júnior; Petrix Barbosa; Péricles Silva; Diego Hypólito; Arthur Zanetti; Sérgio Sasaki	Puerto Rico; Rafael Morales; Angel Ramos; Tommy Ramos; Luis Rivera; Alexander Rodríguez; Luis Vargas	United States; Donothan Bailey; Christopher Maestas; Tyler Mizoguchi; Sho Nakamori; Paul Ruggeri; Brandon Wynn
2015	(Canada) Toronto	United States; Marvin Kimble; Steven Legendre; Sam Mikulak; Paul Ruggeri; Donnell Whittenburg	Brazil; Francisco Barretto Júnior; Caio Souza; Lucas Bitencourt; Arthur Zanetti; Arthur Nory	Colombia; Carlos Calvo; Jossimar Calvo; Jorge Hugo Giraldo; Didier Lugo; Jhonny Muñoz
2019	(Peru) Lima	Brazil; Francisco Barretto; Arthur Nory; Luís Guilherme Porto; Caio Souza; Arthur Zanetti	United States; Cameron Bock; Grant Breckenridge; Brody Malone; Robert Neff; Genki Suzuki	Canada; Zachary Clay; René Cournoyer; Justin Karstadt; Cory Paterson; Samuel Zakutney
2023	(Chile) Santiago	United States; Cameron Bock; Stephen Nedoroscik; Curran Phillips; Colt Walker; Donnell Whittenburg	Canada; Zachary Clay; René Cournoyer; Félix Dolci; William Émard; Jayson Rampersad	Brazil; Yuri Guimarães; Arthur Mariano; Bernardo Miranda; Patrick Sampaio; Diogo Soares

== Medal table ==
Rank	Nation	Gold	Silver	Bronze	Total
1	United States (USA)	9	5	3	17
2	Cuba (CUB)	6	6	1	13
3	Brazil (BRA)	2	3	3	8
4	Puerto Rico (PUR)	1	1	0	2
5	Argentina (ARG)	1	0	2	3
6	Canada (CAN)	0	4	5	9
7	Mexico (MEX)	0	0	4	4
8	Colombia (COL)	0	0	1	1
Totals (8 entries)		19	19	19	57
