= List of Pan American Games medalists in gymnastics =

This is the complete list of Pan American Games medalists in gymnastics from 1951 to 2023.

== Artistic gymnastics ==
=== Men's events ===
- Gymnastics at the Pan American Games – Men's team all-around
- Gymnastics at the Pan American Games – Men's individual all-around
- Gymnastics at the Pan American Games – Men's floor
- Gymnastics at the Pan American Games – Men's pommel horse
- Gymnastics at the Pan American Games – Men's rings
- Gymnastics at the Pan American Games – Men's vault
- Gymnastics at the Pan American Games – Men's parallel bars
- Gymnastics at the Pan American Games – Men's horizontal bar

==== Men's team floor exercise ====
Games	Gold	Silver	Bronze
1951 Buenos Aires	Argentina; Mario Fizbein; Ovidio Ferrari; César Bonoris; Jorge Soler; Enrique Rapesta; Pedro Lonchibuco; Juan Caviglia; Roberto Núñez	Cuba; José Vázquez; Raimundo Rey; Francisco Cascante; Baldomero Rubiera; Roberto Villacián; Fernando Lecuona; Ángel Aguiar; Rafael Lecuona	Mexico; José Savignon; Manuel Ortiz; Carlos Duarte; José Rosellón; Rubén Lira; Guillermo Yáñez; Manuel Guzmán; Everardo Rios
1955 Mexico City	United States; Jack Beckner; Joe Kotys; Jack Miles; Abie Grossfeld; Don Holder; Dick Beckner	Cuba; Rafael Lecuona; Luis Santana; Francisco Cascante; Baldomero Rubiera; Ángel Franco; Roberto Villacián	Argentina; Juan Caviglia; Ovidio Ferrari; César Bonoris; Enrique Rapesta; Joaquín Zbikowski; Jaroslav Slanina

==== Men's team pommel horse ====
Games	Gold	Silver	Bronze
1951 Buenos Aires	Argentina; Mario Fizbein; Ovidio Ferrari; César Bonoris; Jorge Soler; Enrique Rapesta; Pedro Lonchibuco; Juan Caviglia; Roberto Núñez	Cuba; José Vázquez; Raimundo Rey; Francisco Cascante; Baldomero Rubiera; Roberto Villacián; Fernando Lecuona; Ángel Aguiar; Rafael Lecuona	Mexico; José Savignon; Manuel Ortiz; Carlos Duarte; José Rosellón; Rubén Lira; Guillermo Yáñez; Manuel Guzmán; Everardo Rios
1955 Mexico City	United States; Jack Beckner; Joe Kotys; Jack Miles; Abie Grossfeld; Don Holder; Dick Beckner	Cuba; Rafael Lecuona; Luis Santana; Francisco Cascante; Baldomero Rubiera; Ángel Franco; Roberto Villacián	Argentina; Juan Caviglia; Ovidio Ferrari; César Bonoris; Enrique Rapesta; Joaquín Zbikowski; Jaroslav Slanina

==== Men's team still rings ====
Games	Gold	Silver	Bronze
1951 Buenos Aires	Cuba; José Vázquez; Raimundo Rey; Francisco Cascante; Baldomero Rubiera; Roberto Villacián; Fernando Lecuona; Ángel Aguiar; Rafael Lecuona	Argentina; Mario Fizbein; Ovidio Ferrari; César Bonoris; Jorge Soler; Enrique Rapesta; Pedro Lonchibuco; Juan Caviglia; Roberto Núñez	Mexico; José Savignon; Manuel Ortiz; Carlos Duarte; José Rosellón; Rubén Lira; Guillermo Yáñez; Manuel Guzmán; Everardo Rios
1955 Mexico City	United States; Jack Beckner; Joe Kotys; Jack Miles; Abie Grossfeld; Don Holder; Dick Beckner	Cuba; Rafael Lecuona; Luis Santana; Francisco Cascante; Baldomero Rubiera; Ángel Franco; Roberto Villacián	Argentina; Juan Caviglia; Ovidio Ferrari; César Bonoris; Enrique Rapesta; Joaquín Zbikowski; Jaroslav Slanina

==== Men's team vault ====
Games	Gold	Silver	Bronze
1951 Buenos Aires	Cuba; José Vázquez; Raimundo Rey; Francisco Cascante; Baldomero Rubiera; Roberto Villacián; Fernando Lecuona; Ángel Aguiar; Rafael Lecuona	Argentina; Mario Fizbein; Ovidio Ferrari; César Bonoris; Jorge Soler; Enrique Rapesta; Pedro Lonchibuco; Juan Caviglia; Roberto Núñez	Mexico; José Savignon; Manuel Ortiz; Carlos Duarte; José Rosellón; Rubén Lira; Guillermo Yáñez; Manuel Guzmán; Everardo Rios
1955 Mexico City	United States; Jack Beckner; Joe Kotys; Jack Miles; Abie Grossfeld; Don Holder; Dick Beckner	Argentina; Juan Caviglia; Ovidio Ferrari; César Bonoris; Enrique Rapesta; Joaquín Zbikowski; Jaroslav Slanina	Cuba; Rafael Lecuona; Luis Santana; Francisco Cascante; Baldomero Rubiera; Ángel Franco; Roberto Villacián

==== Men's team parallel bars ====
Games	Gold	Silver	Bronze
1951 Buenos Aires	Cuba; José Vázquez; Raimundo Rey; Francisco Cascante; Baldomero Rubiera; Roberto Villacián; Fernando Lecuona; Ángel Aguiar; Rafael Lecuona	Argentina; Mario Fizbein; Ovidio Ferrari; César Bonoris; Jorge Soler; Enrique Rapesta; Pedro Lonchibuco; Juan Caviglia; Roberto Núñez	Mexico; José Savignon; Manuel Ortiz; Carlos Duarte; José Rosellón; Rubén Lira; Guillermo Yáñez; Manuel Guzmán; Everardo Rios
1955 Mexico City	United States; Jack Beckner; Joe Kotys; Jack Miles; Abie Grossfeld; Don Holder; Dick Beckner	Cuba; Rafael Lecuona; Luis Santana; Francisco Cascante; Baldomero Rubiera; Ángel Franco; Roberto Villacián	Argentina; Juan Caviglia; Ovidio Ferrari; César Bonoris; Enrique Rapesta; Joaquín Zbikowski; Jaroslav Slanina

==== Men's team horizontal bar ====
Games	Gold	Silver	Bronze
1951 Buenos Aires	Argentina; Mario Fizbein; Ovidio Ferrari; César Bonoris; Jorge Soler; Enrique Rapesta; Pedro Lonchibuco; Juan Caviglia; Roberto Núñez	Mexico; José Savignon; Manuel Ortiz; Carlos Duarte; José Rosellón; Rubén Lira; Guillermo Yáñez; Manuel Guzmán; Everardo Rios	Cuba; José Vázquez; Raimundo Rey; Francisco Cascante; Baldomero Rubiera; Roberto Villacián; Fernando Lecuona; Ángel Aguiar; Rafael Lecuona
1955 Mexico City	United States; Jack Beckner; Joe Kotys; Jack Miles; Abie Grossfeld; Don Holder; Dick Beckner	Argentina; Juan Caviglia; Ovidio Ferrari; César Bonoris; Enrique Rapesta; Joaquín Zbikowski; Jaroslav Slanina	Cuba; Rafael Lecuona; Luis Santana; Francisco Cascante; Baldomero Rubiera; Ángel Franco; Roberto Villacián

=== Women's events ===
- Gymnastics at the Pan American Games – Women's team all-around
- Gymnastics at the Pan American Games – Women's individual all-around
- Gymnastics at the Pan American Games – Women's vault
- Gymnastics at the Pan American Games – Women's uneven bars
- Gymnastics at the Pan American Games – Women's balance beam
- Gymnastics at the Pan American Games – Women's floor

== Club swinging ==
=== Men's club swinging ===
Games	Gold	Silver	Bronze
1955 Mexico City	Francisco Alvarez; Mexico	Don Holder; United States	Jack Miles; United States
1959 Chicago	Francisco Alvarez; Mexico	Porfirio Rivera; Mexico	Ronald Munn; United States

== Rhythmic gymnastics ==
=== Team all-around ===
Games	Gold	Silver	Bronze
1991 Havana	Canada; Mary Fuzesi; Susan Cushman; Madonna Gimotea	Cuba; Lourdes Medina; Danelis Alarcon; Yalili Fung	United States; Naomi Hewitt; Diane Simpson; Jenifer Lovell
1995 Mar del Plata	United States; Tamara Levinson; Jessica Davis	Cuba; Yordania Corrales; Yamile Sotolongo; Kirenia Ruiz	Argentina; Cecilia Schtutman; Luciana Eslava; Alejandra Unsain

=== Group all-around ===
Games	Gold	Silver	Bronze
1991 Havana	Cuba; Nelly Ochoa; Raima Pérez; Yordania Corrales; Yonaisy Amores; Yuliex Cuevas; Laritza Jiménez	Brazil; Gabriela Astiazara; Valquíria Aydos; Débora Sana; Bibiana Pitta; Alessandra Seligman; Alessandra Frederico	Canada; Maddie Beamer; Dorin Grunwald; Vanessa Hill; Alyssa Pearce; Katie Wills; Colleen McDermott
1995 Mar del Plata	Cuba; Yonaisy Amores; Lisell Pedraza; Danae Varela; Yasleidy Rodriguez; Yuliex Cuevas	United States; Aliane Baquerot; Becky Turner; Brandi Siegel; Challen Sievers; Mandy James	Brazil; Dayane da Silva; Luciana Barichelo; Camila Ferezin; Fernanda Festa; Luciane de Oliveira
1999 Winnipeg	Brazil; Camila Ferezin; Alessandra Ferezin; Flávia de Faria; Dayane da Silva; Juliana Coradine; Michele Salzano	Cuba; Yordania Corrales; Yasleidy Rodriguez; Kirenia Ruiz; Arletys Chacon; Grissell Pedraza	Canada; Katie Iafolla; Julie Hayward; Andrea Sellen; Jenny Pudavick; Joanna Krecsy
2003 Santo Domingo	Brazil; Fernanda Cavalieri; Ana Maria Maciel; Thalita Nakadomari; Gabriela Andrioli; Dayane da Silva; Natália Eidt	Canada; Roxy Cervantes; Ira Funtikova; Pam Jewell; Emilie Livingstone; Sarah Stock	Cuba; Yenly Figueredo; Kirenia Ruíz; Arletys Chacon; Yanet Comas; Diana Díaz; Mirlay Sánchez
2007 Rio de Janeiro	Brazil; Daniela Leite; Tayanne Mantovaneli; Luisa Matsuo; Marcela Menezes; Nicole Muller; Natália Sanchez	Cuba; Yanet Comas; Maydelis Delgado; Rachel Kindelan; Elsy Ortíz; Yeney Renovales; Mirlay Sánchez	Canada; Kathryn de Cata; Alissa Hansen; Monika Lechowicz; Suzanne Lendvay; Brihana Mosienko; Roxanne Porter
2011 Guadalajara	Brazil; Dayane Amaral; Debora Falda; Luisa Matsuo; Bianca Mendonça; Eliane Sampaio; Drielly Daltoe	Canada; Katrina Cameron; Rose Cossar; Alexandra Landry; Anastasiya Muntyanu; Anjelika Reznik; Kelsey Titmarsh	Cuba; Maydelis Delgado; Zenia Fernandez; Lianet Jose; Martha Perez; Yeney Renovales; Legna Savon
2015 Toronto	Brazil; Dayane Amaral; Morgana Gmach; Emanuelle Lima; Jessica Maier; Ana Paula Ribeiro; Beatriz Pomini	United States; Kiana Eide; Alisa Kano; Natalie McGiffert; Jennifer Rokhman; Monica Rokhman; Kristen Shaldybin	Cuba; Claudia Arjona; Zenia Fernandez; Melissa Kindelan; Martha Perez; Adriana Ramirez; Legna Savon
2019 Lima	Mexico; Ana Galindo; Adriana Hernández; Mildred Maldonado; Britany Sainz; Karen Villanueva	United States; Isabelle Connor; Yelyzaveta Merenzon; Elizaveta Pletneva; Nicole Sladkov; Kristina Sobolevskaya	Brazil; Vitoria Guerra; Déborah Medrado; Nicole Pircio; Camila Rossi; Beatriz da Silva
2023 Santiago	Brazil; Bárbara Urquiza; Gabriella Coradine; Victória Borges; Giovanna Oliveira; Nicole Pircio	Mexico; Julia Gutiérrez; Ana Flores; Kimberly Salazar; Adirem Tejeda; Dalia Alcocer	United States; Katrine Sakhnov; Gergana Petkova; Hana Starkman; Isabelle Connor; Karolina Saverino

=== Group single apparatus ===
Games	Gold	Silver	Bronze
2003 Santo Domingo	Brazil; Ana Maria Maciel; Thalita Nakadomari; Gabriela Andrioli; Dayane da Silva; Natália Eidt	Cuba; Yenly Figueredo; Arletys Chacon; Yanet Comas; Diana Díaz; Mirlay Sánchez	Canada; Roxy Cervantes; Ira Funtikova; Pam Jewell; Emilie Livingstone; Sarah Stock
2007 Rio de Janeiro	Brazil; Daniela Leite; Tayanne Mantovaneli; Luisa Matsuo; Marcela Menezes; Nicole Muller; Natália Sanchez	Cuba; Yanet Comas; Maydelis Delgado; Rachel Kindelan; Elsy Ortíz; Yeney Renovales; Mirlay Sánchez	Canada; Kathryn de Cata; Alissa Hansen; Monika Lechowicz; Suzanne Lendvay; Brihana Mosienko; Roxanne Porter
2011 Guadalajara	Brazil; Dayane Amaral; Debora Falda; Luisa Matsuo; Bianca Mendonça; Eliane Sampaio; Drielly Daltoe	United States; Jessica Bogdanov; Megan Frohlich; Aimee Gupta; Michelle Przybylo; Sofya Roytburg; Sydney Sachs	Canada; Katrina Cameron; Rose Cossar; Alexandra Landry; Anastasiya Muntyanu; Anjelika Reznik; Kelsey Titmarsh
2015 Toronto	Brazil; Dayane Amaral; Morgana Gmach; Emanuelle Lima; Jessica Maier; Ana Paula Ribeiro; Beatriz Pomini	United States; Kiana Eide; Alisa Kano; Natalie McGiffert; Jennifer Rokhman; Monica Rokhman; Kristen Shaldybin	Canada; Katrina Cameron; Maya Kojevnikov; Lucinda Nowell; Vanessa Panov; Anjelika Reznik; Victoria Reznik
2019 Lima	Mexico; Ana Galindo; Adriana Hernández; Mildred Maldonado; Britany Sainz; Karen Villanueva	United States; Isabelle Connor; Yelyzaveta Merenzon; Elizaveta Pletneva; Nicole Sladkov; Kristina Sobolevskaya	Brazil; Vitoria Guerra; Déborah Medrado; Nicole Pircio; Camila Rossi; Beatriz da Silva
2023 Santiago	Brazil; Bárbara Urquiza; Gabriella Coradine; Victória Borges; Giovanna Oliveira; Nicole Pircio	Mexico; Julia Gutiérrez; Ana Flores; Kimberly Salazar; Adirem Tejeda; Dalia Alcocer	United States; Katrine Sakhnov; Gergana Petkova; Hana Starkman; Isabelle Connor; Karolina Saverino

=== Group multiple apparatus ===
Games	Gold	Silver	Bronze
2003 Santo Domingo	Brazil; Fernanda Cavalieri; Ana Maria Maciel; Thalita Nakadomari; Gabriela Andrioli; Dayane da Silva	Cuba; Kirenia Ruíz; Arletys Chacon; Yanet Comas; Diana Díaz; Mirlay Sánchez	Canada; Roxy Cervantes; Ira Funtikova; Pam Jewell; Emilie Livingstone; Sarah Stock
2007 Rio de Janeiro	Brazil; Daniela Leite; Tayanne Mantovaneli; Luisa Matsuo; Marcela Menezes; Nicole Muller; Natália Sanchez	Cuba; Yanet Comas; Maydelis Delgado; Rachel Kindelan; Elsy Ortíz; Yeney Renovales; Mirlay Sánchez	Mexico; Blajaith Aguilar Rojas; Sofia Díaz de León; Marlenne Martínez Medina; Ana Cristina Ortega; Citlaly Quinta Álvarez; Sara Reyes Rodríguez
2011 Guadalajara	Brazil; Dayane Amaral; Debora Falda; Luisa Matsuo; Bianca Mendonça; Eliane Sampaio; Drielly Daltoe	Canada; Katrina Cameron; Rose Cossar; Alexandra Landry; Anastasiya Muntyanu; Anjelika Reznik; Kelsey Titmarsh	United States; Jessica Bogdanov; Megan Frohlich; Aimee Gupta; Michelle Przybylo; Sofya Roytburg; Sydney Sachs
2015 Toronto	United States; Kiana Eide; Alisa Kano; Natalie McGiffert; Jennifer Rokhman; Monica Rokhman; Kristen Shaldybin	Brazil; Dayane Amaral; Morgana Gmach; Emanuelle Lima; Jessica Maier; Ana Paula Ribeiro; Beatriz Pomini	Canada; Katrina Cameron; Maya Kojevnikov; Lucinda Nowell; Vanessa Panov; Anjelika Reznik; Victoria Reznik
2019 Lima	Brazil; Vitoria Guerra; Déborah Medrado; Nicole Pircio; Camila Rossi; Beatriz da Silva	Mexico; Ana Galindo; Adriana Hernández; Mildred Maldonado; Britany Sainz; Karen Villanueva	Cuba; Claudia Arjona; Melissa Kindelán; Tatiana Frometa; Elaine Rojas; Danay Utria
2023 Santiago	Brazil; Bárbara Urquiza; Gabriella Coradine; Victória Borges; Giovanna Oliveira; Nicole Pircio	Mexico; Julia Gutiérrez; Ana Flores; Kimberly Salazar; Adirem Tejeda; Dalia Alcocer	United States; Katrine Sakhnov; Gergana Petkova; Hana Starkman; Isabelle Connor; Karolina Saverino

=== Individual all-around ===
Games	Gold	Silver	Bronze
1987 Indianapolis	Lourdes Medina; Cuba	Diane Simpson; United States	Mary Fuzesi; Canada
1991 Havana	Lourdes Medina; Cuba	Mary Fuzesi; Canada	Susan Cushman; Canada
1995 Mar del Plata	Yordania Corrales; Cuba	Tamara Levinson; United States	Jessica Davis; United States
1999 Winnipeg	Emilie Livingston; Canada	Jessica Howard; United States	Yordania Corrales; Cuba
2003 Santo Domingo	Mary Sanders; United States	Olga Karmansky; United States	Anahí Sosa; Argentina
2007 Rio de Janeiro	Lisa Wang; United States	Cynthia Valdez; Mexico	Rut Castillo Galindo; Mexico
2011 Guadalajara	Julie Zetlin; United States	Cynthia Valdez; Mexico	Angélica Kvieczynski; Brazil
2015 Toronto	Laura Zeng; United States	Jasmine Kerber; United States	Patricia Bezzoubenko; Canada
2019 Lima	Evita Griskenas; United States	Camilla Feeley; United States	Natália Gaudio; Brazil
2023 Santiago	Bárbara Domingos; Brazil	Evita Griskenas; United States	Maria Eduarda Alexandre; Brazil

=== Individual rope ===
Games	Gold	Silver	Bronze
1987 Indianapolis	Diane Simpson; United States	Lourdes Medina; Cuba	Marina Kunyavsky; United States
1991 Havana	Lourdes Medina; Cuba	Mary Fuzesi; Canada	Naomi Hewitt; United States
1995 Mar del Plata	Yordania Corrales; Cuba	Kirenia Ruiz; Cuba	Tamara Levinson; United States
2007 Rio de Janeiro	Alexandra Orlando; Canada	Lisa Wang; United States	Cynthia Valdéz Pérez; Mexico

=== Individual hoop ===
Games	Gold	Silver	Bronze
1987 Indianapolis	Lourdes Medina; Cuba	Diane Simpson; United States	Mary Fuzesi; Canada
1991 Havana	Mary Fuzesi; Canada	Lourdes Medina; Cuba	Susan Cushman; Canada
2003 Santo Domingo	Mary Sanders; United States	Alexandra Orlando; Canada	Anahí Sosa; Argentina
2007 Rio de Janeiro	Alexandra Orlando; Canada	Rut Castillo Galindo; Mexico	Ana Paula Scheffer; Brazil
2011 Guadalajara	Cynthia Valdez; Mexico	Julie Zetlin; United States	Angélica Kvieczynski; Brazil
2015 Toronto	Laura Zeng; United States	Jasmine Kerber; United States	Angélica Kvieczynski; Brazil
2019 Lima	Evita Griskenas; United States	Katherine Uchida; Canada	Camilla Feeley; United States
2023 Santiago	Maria Eduarda Alexandre; Brazil	Bárbara Domingos; Brazil	Evita Griskenas; United States

=== Individual clubs ===
Games	Gold	Silver	Bronze
1987 Indianapolis	Lourdes Medina; Cuba	Mary Fuzesi; Canada	Susan Cushman; Canada Marina Kunyavsky; United States
1991 Havana	Lourdes Medina; Cuba	Naomi Hewitt; United States	Yalili Fung; Cuba
1995 Mar del Plata	Yordania Corrales; Cuba	Jessica Davis; United States	Tamara Levinson; United States
2003 Santo Domingo	Mary Sanders; United States	Alexandra Orlando; Canada	Tayanne Mantovaneli; Brazil
2007 Rio de Janeiro	Alexandra Orlando; Canada	Lisa Wang; United States	Rut Castillo Galindo; Mexico
2011 Guadalajara	Cynthia Valdez; Mexico	Angélica Kvieczynski; Brazil	Mariam Chamilova; Canada
2015 Toronto	Laura Zeng; United States	Patricia Bezzoubenko; Canada	Jasmine Kerber; United States
2019 Lima	Camilla Feeley; United States	Natalie Garcia; Canada	Evita Griskenas; United States
2023 Santiago	Maria Eduarda Alexandre; Brazil	Bárbara Domingos; Brazil	Evita Griskenas; United States

=== Individual ribbon ===
Games	Gold	Silver	Bronze
1987 Indianapolis	Diane Simpson; United States	Lourdes Medina; Cuba	Mary Fuzesi; Canada Thalia Fung; Cuba
1995 Mar del Plata	Tamara Levinson; United States	Jessica Davis; United States	Luciana Eslava; Argentina
2003 Santo Domingo	Mary Sanders; United States	Alexandra Orlando; Canada	Cynthia Valdez; Mexico
2007 Rio de Janeiro	Lisa Wang; United States	Julie Zetlin; United States	Cynthia Valdéz Pérez; Mexico
2011 Guadalajara	Julie Zetlin; United States	Cynthia Valdez; Mexico	Ana Pini Carrasco; Argentina
2015 Toronto	Laura Zeng; United States	Jasmine Kerber; United States	Angélica Kvieczynski; Brazil
2019 Lima	Evita Griskenas; United States	Bárbara Domingos; Brazil	Karla Diaz; Mexico
2023 Santiago	Bárbara Domingos; Brazil	Maria Eduarda Alexandre; Brazil	Evita Griskenas; United States

=== Individual ball ===
Games	Gold	Silver	Bronze
1991 Havana	Lourdes Medina; Cuba	Mary Fuzesi; Canada	Madonna Gimotea; Canada Jenifer Lovell; United States
1995 Mar del Plata	Alejandra Unsain; Argentina	Cecilia Schtutman; Argentina	Tamara Levinson; United States
2003 Santo Domingo	Mary Sanders; United States	Olga Karmansky; United States	Alexandra Orlando; Canada
2011 Guadalajara	Julie Zetlin; United States	Cynthia Valdez; Mexico	Angélica Kvieczynski; Brazil
2015 Toronto	Laura Zeng; United States	Jasmine Kerber; United States	Karla Diaz; Mexico
2019 Lima	Evita Griskenas; United States	Katherine Uchida; Canada	Camilla Feeley; United States
2023 Santiago	Bárbara Domingos; Brazil	Geovanna Santos; Brazil	Evita Griskenas; United States

== Rope climbing ==
=== Men's rope climbing ===
Games	Gold	Silver	Bronze
1955 Mexico City	Donald Perry; United States	Baldomero Rubiera; Cuba	Roberto Villacián; Cuba
1959 Chicago	Garvin Smith; United States	Nino Marion; Canada	Richard Montpetit; Canada

== Trampoline and tumbling ==
=== Men's individual trampoline ===
Games	Gold	Silver	Bronze
1955 Mexico City	Donald Harper; United States	William Roy; United States	Eduardo Fereda; Venezuela
1959 Chicago	Ronald Munn; United States	Harold Holmes; United States	Abie Grossfeld; United States
2007 Rio de Janeiro	Chris Estrada; United States	Jason Burnett; Canada	Ryan Weston; United States
2011 Guadalajara	Keegan Soehn; Canada	Rafael Andrade; Brazil	José Alberto Vargas; Mexico
2015 Toronto	Keegan Soehn; Canada	Steven Gluckstein; United States	Ángel Hernández; Colombia
2019 Lima	Jérémy Chartier; Canada	Jeffrey Gluckstein; United States	Ruben Padilla; United States
2023 Santiago	Ángel Hernández; Colombia	Rayan Dutra; Brazil	Santiago Ferrari; Argentina

=== Men's individual tumbling ===
Games	Gold	Silver	Bronze
1955 Mexico City	William Roy; United States	Joe Kotys; United States	Juan Caviglia; Argentina
1959 Chicago	Harold Holmes; United States	Jamile Ashmore; United States	Abie Grossfeld; United States

=== Men's synchronized trampoline ===
Games	Gold	Silver	Bronze
2023 Santiago	United States; Aliaksei Shostak; Ruben Padilla	Canada; Rémi Aubin; Keegan Soehn	Brazil; Lucas Tobias; Rayan Dutra

=== Women's individual trampoline ===
Games	Gold	Silver	Bronze
2007 Rio de Janeiro	Karen Cockburn; Canada	Rosie MacLennan; Canada	Giovanna Matheus; Brazil
2011 Guadalajara	Rosie MacLennan; Canada	Dakota Earnest; United States	Alaina Williams; United States
2015 Toronto	Rosie MacLennan; Canada	Dafne Navarro; Mexico	Karen Cockburn; Canada
2019 Lima	Samantha Smith; Canada	Nicole Ahsinger; United States	Dafne Navarro; Mexico
2023 Santiago	Jessica Stevens; United States	Camilla Gomes; Brazil	Dafne Navarro; Mexico

=== Women's synchronized trampoline ===
Games	Gold	Silver	Bronze
2023 Santiago	United States; Jessica Stevens; Nicole Ahsinger	Brazil; Alice Gomes; Camilla Gomes	Mexico; Dafne Navarro; Mariola García
