= Gymnastics at the Pan American Games – Men's parallel bars =

Men's events at the Gymnastics at the Pan American Games were first held at the 1951 Pan American Games.

Three medals are awarded: gold for first place, silver for second place, and bronze for third place.

== Medalists ==
Year	Location	Gold	Silver	Bronze
1951	(Argentina) Buenos Aires	(Argentina) Pedro Lonchibuco	(Argentina) Enrique Rapesta	(Argentina) Juan Caviglia
1955	Mexico City	(United States) Jack Beckner (United States) Dick Beckner	Not awarded	(United States) Abie Grossfeld
1959	(United States) Chicago	(United States) Jack Beckner	(United States) Gregor Weiss	(United States) Don Tonry
1963	(Brazil) São Paulo	(United States) Don Tonry	(Canada) Wilhelm Weiler	(United States) Gar O'Quinn
1967	(Canada) Winnipeg	(United States) Richard Lloyd (United States) Fred Roethlisberger	Not awarded	(United States) Arno Lascari
1971	(Colombia) Cali	(United States) John Ellas	(United States) John Crosby Jr.	(United States) David Butzman
1975	Mexico City	(Cuba) Roberto Léon Richards	(United States) Gene Whelan	(Cuba) Jorge Cuervo
1979	(Puerto Rico) San Juan	(Cuba) Roberto Léon Richards	(United States) Daniel Muenz	(Cuba) Enrique Bravo
1983	(Venezuela) Caracas	(Cuba) Roberto Léon Richards	(United States) Tom Beach	(Cuba) Casimiro Suárez
1987	(United States) Indianapolis	(United States) Scott Johnson	(Cuba) Casimiro Suárez	(Cuba) Félix Aguilera
1991	(Cuba) Havana	(Cuba) Erick López (United States) Dominick Minicucci	Not awarded	(Cuba) Félix Aguilera (Mexico) Luis López (Argentina) Isidro Ibarrondo
1995	(Argentina) Mar del Plata	(Cuba) Erick López	(Cuba) Lazaro Lamelas Ramirez	(Argentina) Isidro Ibarrondo
1999	(Canada) Winnipeg	(Cuba) Erick López	(Colombia) Jorge Hugo Giraldo	(Cuba) Abel Driggs Santos
2003	(Dominican Republic) Santo Domingo	(Cuba) Erick López	(Cuba) Abel Driggs Santos	(Colombia) Jorge Hugo Giraldo
2007	(Brazil) Rio de Janeiro	(United States) Justin Spring	(Colombia) Jorge Hugo Giraldo	(Puerto Rico) Luis Vargas Velásquez
2011	(Mexico) Guadalajara	(Mexico) Daniel Corral	(Colombia) Jorge Hugo Giraldo (United States) Paul Ruggeri (Puerto Rico) Luis Vargas Velásquez	Not awarded
2015	(Canada) Toronto	(Colombia) Jossimar Calvo	(Cuba) Manrique Larduet	(United States) Sam Mikulak
2019	(Peru) Lima	(Mexico) Isaac Núñez	(Brazil) Caio Souza	(United States) Cameron Bock
2023	(Chile) Santiago	(United States) Curran Phillips	(United States) Colt Walker	(Mexico) Isaac Núñez

== Medal table ==
Rank	Nation	Gold	Silver	Bronze	Total
1	United States (USA)	11	7	7	25
2	Cuba (CUB)	7	4	6	17
3	Mexico (MEX)	2	0	2	4
4	Colombia (COL)	1	3	1	5
5	Argentina (ARG)	1	1	3	5
6	Puerto Rico (PUR)	0	1	1	2
7	Brazil (BRA)	0	1	0	1
7	Canada (CAN)	0	1	0	1
Totals (8 entries)		22	18	20	60
