= Gymnastics at the Pan American Games – Men's horizontal bar =

Men's events at the Gymnastics at the Pan American Games were first held at the 1951 Pan American Games.

Three medals are awarded: gold for first place, silver for second place, and bronze for third place.

== Medalists ==
Year	Location	Gold	Silver	Bronze
1951	(Argentina) Buenos Aires	(United States) Bill Roetzheim	(Argentina) Juan Caviglia	(Argentina) César Bonoris
1955	Mexico City	(United States) Abie Grossfeld	(United States) Jack Miles	(United States) Joe Kotys
1959	(United States) Chicago	(United States) Abie Grossfeld	(United States) Jack Beckner	(United States) Don Tonry
1963	(Brazil) São Paulo	(United States) Abie Grossfeld	(Canada) Wilhelm Weiler	(United States) Jay Werner
1967	(Canada) Winnipeg	(United States) Fred Roethlisberger	(Mexico) Fernando Valles	(United States) Dave Thor
1971	(Colombia) Cali	(Cuba) Jorge Rodríguez	(United States) John Crosby Jr.	(Cuba) Jorge Cuervo (United States) Brent Simmons
1975	Mexico City	(Cuba) Jorge Cuervo	(United States) Gene Whelan	(United States) Kurt Thomas
1979	(Puerto Rico) San Juan	(Cuba) Jorge Roche	(Cuba) Roberto Léon Richards	(Canada) Warren Long
1983	(Venezuela) Caracas	(Cuba) Casimiro Suárez	(Cuba) Jesús Rivera	(United States) Billy Paul
1987	(United States) Indianapolis	(Cuba) Félix Aguilera	(United States) Scott Johnson (Cuba) Casimiro Suárez	Not awarded
1991	(Cuba) Havana	(Cuba) Félix Aguilera	(Mexico) Luis López	(United States) Trent Dimas
1995	(Argentina) Mar del Plata	(United States) John Roethlisberger	(Puerto Rico) Victor Colon	(United States) Bill Roth
1999	(Canada) Winnipeg	(Canada) Alexander Jeltkov	(Cuba) Erick López	(Puerto Rico) Luis Vargas Velásquez
2003	(Dominican Republic) Santo Domingo	(Puerto Rico) Tommy Ramos	(Cuba) Michael Brito	(Brazil) Mosiah Rodrigues
2007	(Brazil) Rio de Janeiro	(Brazil) Mosiah Rodrigues	(Colombia) Jorge Hugo Giraldo	(Brazil) Danilo Nogueira
2011	(Mexico) Guadalajara	(United States) Paul Ruggeri	(Colombia) Jossimar Calvo	(Puerto Rico) Angel Ramos
2015	(Canada) Toronto	(Colombia) Jossimar Calvo	(Canada) Kevin Lytwyn	(United States) Paul Ruggeri
2019	(Peru) Lima	(Brazil) Francisco Barretto	(Brazil) Arthur Mariano	(Cuba) Huber Godoy
2023	(Chile) Santiago	(Brazil) Arthur Mariano	(Brazil) Bernardo Miranda	(Canada) René Cournoyer

== Medal table ==
Rank	Nation	Gold	Silver	Bronze	Total
1	United States (USA)	7	5	10	22
2	Cuba (CUB)	6	5	2	13
3	Brazil (BRA)	3	2	2	7
4	Canada (CAN)	1	2	2	5
5	Colombia (COL)	1	2	0	3
6	Puerto Rico (PUR)	1	1	2	4
7	Mexico (MEX)	0	2	0	2
8	Argentina (ARG)	0	1	1	2
Totals (8 entries)		19	20	19	58
