= Gymnastics at the Pan American Games – Men's vault =

Men's events at the Gymnastics at the Pan American Games were first held at the 1951 Pan American Games.

Three medals are awarded: gold for first place, silver for second place, and bronze for third place.

== Medalists ==
Year	Location	Gold	Silver	Bronze
1951	(Argentina) Buenos Aires	(Cuba) Ángel Aguiar	(Cuba) Rafael Lecuona	(Argentina) Ovidio Ferrari
1955	Mexico City	(United States) Joe Kotys	(United States) Don Holder (United States) Jack Miles	Not awarded
1959	(United States) Chicago	(United States) Jack Beckner	(Canada) Richard Montpetit (United States) Gregor Weiss	Not awarded
1963	(Brazil) São Paulo	(Canada) Wilhelm Weiler	(United States) Jay Werner	(United States) Don Tonry
1967	(Canada) Winnipeg	(Cuba) Jorge Rodríguez	(Cuba) Octavio Suárez	(Canada) Roger Dion (Mexico) Rogelio Mendoza (United States) Fred Roethlisberger
1971	(Colombia) Cali	(Cuba) Jorge Cuervo	(Cuba) Jorge Rodríguez	(United States) John Crosby Jr.
1975	Mexico City	(Cuba) Jorge Cuervo	(United States) Kurt Thomas	(United States) Marshall Avener
1979	(Puerto Rico) San Juan	(Cuba) Casimiro Suárez	(Canada) Warren Long	(Peru) Richard Mazabel
1983	(Venezuela) Caracas	(Cuba) Casimiro Suárez	(Venezuela) Jorge Marin	(Cuba) Israel Sánchez
1987	(United States) Indianapolis	(Cuba) Casimiro Suárez	(United States) Scott Johnson	(Mexico) Alejandro Peniche
1991	(Cuba) Havana	(Cuba) Erick López	(Cuba) Casimiro Suárez	(Puerto Rico) Victor Colon (Mexico) Alejandro Peniche
1995	(Argentina) Mar del Plata	(Venezuela) Víctor Solorzano	(Cuba) Lazaro Lamelas Ramirez	(Canada) Kris Burley
1999	(Canada) Winnipeg	(Cuba) Abel Driggs Santos	(Cuba) Yoandry Díaz	(Canada) Kris Burley
2003	(Dominican Republic) Santo Domingo	(Cuba) Erick López	(Brazil) Diego Hypólito	(Brazil) Michel Conceição
2007	(Brazil) Rio de Janeiro	(Brazil) Diego Hypólito	(Chile) Tomás González	(Puerto Rico) Luis Rivera
2011	(Mexico) Guadalajara	(Brazil) Diego Hypólito	(Chile) Tomás González	(Canada) Hugh Smith
2015	(Canada) Toronto	(Cuba) Manrique Larduet	(United States) Donnell Whittenburg	(Brazil) Caio Souza
2019	(Peru) Lima	(Dominican Republic) Audrys Nin Reyes	(Guatemala) Jorge Vega	(Cuba) Alejandro de la Cruz
2023	(Chile) Santiago	(Dominican Republic) Audrys Nin Reyes	(Brazil) Arthur Mariano	(Canada) Félix Dolci

== Medal table ==
Rank	Nation	Gold	Silver	Bronze	Total
1	Cuba (CUB)	11	7	1	19
2	United States (USA)	2	7	4	13
3	Brazil (BRA)	2	2	2	6
4	Dominican Republic (DOM)	2	0	0	2
5	Canada (CAN)	1	2	5	8
6	Venezuela (VEN)	1	1	0	2
7	Chile (CHI)	0	2	0	2
8	Guatemala (GUA)	0	1	0	1
9	Mexico (MEX)	0	0	3	3
10	Puerto Rico (PUR)	0	0	2	2
11	Argentina (ARG)	0	0	1	1
11	Peru (PER)	0	0	1	1
Totals (12 entries)		19	22	19	60
