= Gymnastics at the Pan American Games – Men's individual all-around =

Men's events at the Gymnastics at the Pan American Games were first held at the 1951 Pan American Games.

Three medals are awarded: gold for first place, silver for second place, and bronze for third place.

== Medalists ==
Year	Location	Gold	Silver	Bronze
1951	(Argentina) Buenos Aires	(United States) Bill Roetzheim	(Cuba) Rafael Lecuona	(Argentina) Juan Caviglia
1955	Mexico City	(United States) Jack Beckner	(United States) Joe Kotys	(United States) Jack Miles
1959	(United States) Chicago	(United States) Jack Beckner	(United States) Abie Grossfeld	(United States) Don Tonry
1963	(Brazil) São Paulo	(Canada) Wilhelm Weiler	(United States) Don Tonry	(United States) Jay Werner
1967	(Canada) Winnipeg	(United States) Fred Roethlisberger	(Mexico) Fernando Valles	(United States) Dave Thor
1971	(Colombia) Cali	(Cuba) Jorge Rodríguez	(United States) John Crosby Jr.	(Cuba) Jorge Cuervo
1975	Mexico City	(Cuba) Jorge Cuervo	(Cuba) Roberto Richards	(United States) Kurt Thomas
1979	(Puerto Rico) San Juan	(Cuba) Casimiro Suárez	(Cuba) Jorge Roche	(Cuba) Enrique Bravo (Canada) Warren Long
1983	(Venezuela) Caracas	(Cuba) Casimiro Suárez	(United States) Brian Babcock	(Cuba) Israel Sánchez
1987	(United States) Indianapolis	(United States) Scott Johnson	(Cuba) Casimiro Suárez	(United States) Tim Daggett
1991	(Cuba) Havana	(Cuba) Erick López	(Cuba) José Tejada	(Cuba) Félix Aguilera
1995	(Argentina) Mar del Plata	(Cuba) Erick López	(United States) John Roethlisberger	(Cuba) Lazaro Lamelas
1999	(Canada) Winnipeg	(Cuba) Erick López	(Canada) Alexander Jeltkov	(Cuba) Lazaro Lamelas
2003	(Dominican Republic) Santo Domingo	(Cuba) Erick López	(United States) David Durante	(Colombia) Giovanni Quintero
2007	(Brazil) Rio de Janeiro	(Venezuela) José Luis Fuentes	(Colombia) Jorge Hugo Giraldo	(United States) Guillermo Alvarez
2011	(Mexico) Guadalajara	(Colombia) Jossimar Calvo	(Colombia) Jorge Hugo Giraldo	(Chile) Tomás González
2015	(Canada) Toronto	(United States) Sam Mikulak	(Cuba) Manrique Larduet	(Colombia) Jossimar Calvo
2019	(Peru) Lima	(Brazil) Caio Souza	(Brazil) Arthur Mariano	(Canada) Cory Paterson
2023	(Chile) Santiago	(Canada) Félix Dolci	(Brazil) Diogo Soares	(United States) Donnell Whittenburg

== Medal table ==
Rank	Nation	Gold	Silver	Bronze	Total
1	Cuba (CUB)	8	6	6	20
2	United States (USA)	6	7	8	21
3	Canada (CAN)	2	1	2	5
4	Colombia (COL)	1	2	2	5
5	Brazil (BRA)	1	2	0	3
6	Venezuela (VEN)	1	0	0	1
7	Mexico (MEX)	0	1	0	1
8	Argentina (ARG)	0	0	1	1
8	Chile (CHI)	0	0	1	1
Totals (9 entries)		19	19	20	58
