= Gymnastics at the Pan American Games – Men's rings =

Men's events at the Gymnastics at the Pan American Games were first held at the 1951 Pan American Games.

Three medals are awarded: gold for first place, silver for second place, and bronze for third place.

== Medalists ==
Year	Location	Gold	Silver	Bronze
1951	(Argentina) Buenos Aires	(Cuba) Ángel Aguiar	(Cuba) Fernando Lecuona	(Cuba) Roberto Villacián
1955	Mexico City	(United States) Dick Beckner	(United States) Don Holder	(United States) Abie Grossfeld (United States) Jack Miles
1959	(United States) Chicago	(United States) Jamile Ashmore (United States) Abie Grossfeld	Not awarded	(Canada) Nino Marion
1963	(Brazil) São Paulo	(United States) Jamile Ashmore	(United States) Abie Grossfeld	(Canada) Wilhelm Weiler
1967	(Canada) Winnipeg	(Mexico) Fernando Valles	(United States) Mark Cohn (United States) Fred Roethlisberger	Not awarded
1971	(Colombia) Cali	(United States) John Crosby Jr. (United States) John Ellas	Not awarded	(Cuba) Jorge Rodríguez (Canada) André Simard
1975	Mexico City	(Cuba) Jorge Cuervo (Cuba) Roberto Richards	Not awarded	(United States) Bart Conner
1979	(Puerto Rico) San Juan	(Cuba) Jorge Roche	(Cuba) Mario Castro	(United States) Jeff LaFleur
1983	(Venezuela) Caracas	(Cuba) Casimiro Suárez	(Cuba) Israel Sánchez	(United States) Mark Caso
1987	(United States) Indianapolis	(United States) Scott Johnson	(Cuba) José Fraga	(Cuba) Luis Cartaya (United States) Brian Ginsberg
1991	(Cuba) Havana	(Cuba) Damian Merino	(Cuba) Erick López	(United States) Bob Stelter
1995	(Argentina) Mar del Plata	(Cuba) Damian Merino	(United States) John Roethlisberger	(Cuba) Erick López
1999	(Canada) Winnipeg	(Cuba) Erick López	(Argentina) Sergio Alvarino	(Puerto Rico) Diego Lizardi
2003	(Dominican Republic) Santo Domingo	(Cuba) Erick López	(Venezuela) Regulo Carmona	(Cuba) Abel Driggs Santos
2007	(Brazil) Rio de Janeiro	(Venezuela) Regulo Carmona	(United States) Sean Golden	(Venezuela) Carlos Carbonell
2011	(Mexico) Guadalajara	(United States) Brandon Wynn	(Brazil) Arthur Zanetti	(United States) Christopher Maestas
2015	(Canada) Toronto	(Brazil) Arthur Zanetti	(United States) Donnell Whittenburg	(Cuba) Manrique Larduet
2019	(Peru) Lima	(Mexico) Fabián de Luna	(Brazil) Arthur Zanetti	(Argentina) Federico Molinari
2023	(Chile) Santiago	(United States) Donnell Whittenburg	(Argentina) Daniel Villafañe	(Canada) Félix Dolci

== Medal table ==
Rank	Nation	Gold	Silver	Bronze	Total
1	United States (USA)	9	7	8	24
2	Cuba (CUB)	9	5	6	20
3	Mexico (MEX)	2	0	0	2
4	Brazil (BRA)	1	2	0	3
5	Venezuela (VEN)	1	1	1	3
6	Argentina (ARG)	0	2	1	3
7	Canada (CAN)	0	0	4	4
8	Puerto Rico (PUR)	0	0	1	1
Totals (8 entries)		22	17	21	60
