= Gymnastics at the Pan American Games – Men's floor =

Men's events at the Gymnastics at the Pan American Games were first held at the 1951 Pan American Games.

Three medals are awarded: gold for first place, silver for second place, and bronze for third place.

== Medalists ==
Year	Location	Gold	Silver	Bronze
1951	(Argentina) Buenos Aires	(Argentina) Juan Caviglia	(United States) Bill Roetzheim	(Cuba) Francisco Cascante
1955	Mexico City	(United States) Jack Beckner	(United States) Joe Kotys	(Argentina) Juan Caviglia (United States) Abie Grossfeld
1959	(United States) Chicago	(United States) Abie Grossfeld	(United States) Jamile Ashmore	(United States) Don Tonry
1963	(Brazil) São Paulo	(Canada) Wilhelm Weiler	(Cuba) Héctor Ramírez	(United States) Don Tonry
1967	(Canada) Winnipeg	(Cuba) Héctor Ramírez	(United States) Richard Lloyd	(Mexico) Armando García (United States) Dave Thor
1971	(Colombia) Cali	(United States) John Crosby Jr.	(Cuba) Jorge Rodríguez	(Cuba) Emilio Sagre
1975	Mexico City	(United States) Peter Kormann	(Cuba) Jorge Cuervo	(United States) Bart Conner
1979	(Puerto Rico) San Juan	(Cuba) Casimiro Suárez	(Canada) Warren Long	(Cuba) Jorge Roche
1983	(Venezuela) Caracas	(Cuba) Casimiro Suárez	(Cuba) Jesús Rivera	(United States) Mark Caso
1987	(United States) Indianapolis	(Cuba) Casimiro Suárez	(United States) Scott Johnson	(Cuba) Félix Aguilera
1991	(Cuba) Havana	(Cuba) Damian Merino (United States) Mike Racanelli	Not awarded	(United States) Trent Dimas
1995	(Argentina) Mar del Plata	(Cuba) Damian Merino	(United States) Bill Roth	(Canada) Kris Burley
1999	(Canada) Winnipeg	(Argentina) Eric Pedercini	(Cuba) Yoandry Díaz	(Venezuela) Víctor Solorzano
2003	(Dominican Republic) Santo Domingo	(Canada) Brandon O'Neill	(Brazil) Michel Conceição (United States) Clayton Strother	Not awarded
2007	(Brazil) Rio de Janeiro	(Brazil) Diego Hypólito	(United States) Guillermo Alvarez	(Chile) Tomás González
2011	(Mexico) Guadalajara	(Brazil) Diego Hypólito	(Chile) Tomás González	(Puerto Rico) Alexander Rodríguez
2015	(Canada) Toronto	(Guatemala) Jorge Vega	(United States) Donnell Whittenburg	(United States) Sam Mikulak
2019	(Peru) Lima	(Chile) Tomás González	(United States) Robert Neff	(Colombia) Andrés Martínez
2023	(Chile) Santiago	(Canada) Félix Dolci	(Brazil) Arthur Mariano	(Colombia) Juan Larrahondo

== Medal table ==
Rank	Nation	Gold	Silver	Bronze	Total
1	Cuba (CUB)	6	5	4	15
2	United States (USA)	4	11	8	23
3	Canada (CAN)	3	1	1	5
4	Brazil (BRA)	2	2	0	4
5	Argentina (ARG)	2	0	1	3
6	Chile (CHI)	1	1	1	3
7	Guatemala (GUA)	1	0	0	1
8	Colombia (COL)	0	0	2	2
9	Mexico (MEX)	0	0	1	1
9	Puerto Rico (PUR)	0	0	1	1
9	Venezuela (VEN)	0	0	1	1
Totals (11 entries)		19	20	20	59
