= Gymnastics at the Pan American Games – Men's pommel horse =

Men's events at the Gymnastics at the Pan American Games were first held at the 1951 Pan American Games.

Three medals are awarded: gold for first place, silver for second place, and bronze for third place.

== Medalists ==
Year	Location	Gold	Silver	Bronze
1951	(Argentina) Buenos Aires	(Cuba) Rafael Lecuona	(United States) Bill Roetzheim	(Argentina) Ovidio Ferrari
1955	Mexico City	(United States) Jack Beckner	(Cuba) Rafael Lecuona	(United States) Joe Kotys
1959	(United States) Chicago	(United States) Gregor Weiss	(Canada) Richard Montpetit	(United States) Jack Beckner (United States) Gar O'Quinn
1963	(Brazil) São Paulo	(United States) Gar O'Quinn	(Canada) Wilhelm Weiler	(Canada) Richard Montpetit
1967	(Canada) Winnipeg	(United States) Mark Cohn	(United States) Richard Lloyd	(United States) Dave Thor
1971	(Colombia) Cali	(Cuba) Jorge Rodríguez	(United States) John Crosby Jr.	(United States) John Ellas
1975	Mexico City	(Cuba) Roberto Richards	(United States) Kurt Thomas	(United States) Gene Whelan
1979	(Puerto Rico) San Juan	(Cuba) Roberto Richards	(Cuba) Enrique Bravo	(Canada) Jean Choquette
1983	(Venezuela) Caracas	(Cuba) Luis Amador	(United States) Brian Babcock	(Cuba) Israel Sánchez
1987	(United States) Indianapolis	(United States) Tim Daggett	(United States) Scott Johnson	(Cuba) Félix Aguilera (Puerto Rico) Mario Gonzales (Mexico) Tony Piñeda
1991	(Cuba) Havana	(Cuba) José Tejada	(Cuba) Félix Aguilera	(United States) Dominick Minicucci
1995	(Argentina) Mar del Plata	(Cuba) Erick López	(United States) Mihai Bagiu	(Canada) Richard Ikeda
1999	(Canada) Winnipeg	(Cuba) Erick López	(Venezuela) Carycel Briceno	(Colombia) Jorge Hugo Giraldo
2003	(Dominican Republic) Santo Domingo	(Cuba) Erick López	(Puerto Rico) Luis Vargas Velásquez	(Brazil) Mosiah Rodrigues (United States) Clayton Strother
2007	(Brazil) Rio de Janeiro	(Puerto Rico) Luis Rivera (Venezuela) José Luis Fuentes	Not awarded	(Puerto Rico) Alexander Rodríguez
2011	(Mexico) Guadalajara	(Mexico) Daniel Corral	(Colombia) Jorge Hugo Giraldo	(Colombia) Jorge Peña
2015	(Canada) Toronto	(Colombia) Jossimar Calvo (United States) Marvin Kimble	Not awarded	(Mexico) Daniel Corral
2019	(Peru) Lima	(Brazil) Francisco Barretto	(United States) Robert Neff	(Colombia) Carlos Calvo
2023	(Chile) Santiago	(Canada) Zachary Clay	(Canada) Jayson Rampersad	(Puerto Rico) Nelson Guilbe

== Medal table ==
Rank	Nation	Gold	Silver	Bronze	Total
1	Cuba (CUB)	9	3	2	14
2	United States (USA)	6	8	8	22
3	Canada (CAN)	1	3	3	7
4	Colombia (COL)	1	1	3	5
4	Puerto Rico (PUR)	1	1	3	5
6	Mexico (MEX)	1	0	2	3
7	Brazil (BRA)	1	0	1	2
8	Venezuela (VEN)	0	2	0	2
9	Argentina (ARG)	0	0	1	1
Totals (9 entries)		20	18	23	61
