= Gymnastics at the Pan American Games =

- No. of events: 24 (men: 9; women: 15)

Men's and Women's Artistic gymnastics have been contested at the Pan American Games since the 1951 edition. In 1987, Rhythmic gymnastics was introduced. In 2007, Trampoline gymnastics was added to the program.

== Editions ==
Edition	Host city	Country	Events (men/women)	Most gold medals (artistic gymnastics)	Most gold medals (rhythmic gymnastics)	Most gold medals (trampoline/tumbling)
1951	Buenos Aires	Argentina	14 / 0	Cuba	—N/a	—N/a
1955	Mexico City	Mexico	18 / 0	United States	—N/a	United States
1959	Chicago	United States	12 / 6	United States	—N/a	United States
1963	São Paulo	Brazil	8 / 6	United States	—N/a	—N/a
1967	Winnipeg	Canada	8 / 6	United States	—N/a	—N/a
1971	Cali	Colombia	8 / 6	United States	—N/a	—N/a
1975	Mexico City	Mexico	8 / 6	United States	—N/a	—N/a
1979	San Juan	Puerto Rico	8 / 6	Cuba	—N/a	—N/a
1983	Caracas	Venezuela	8 / 6	Cuba	—N/a	—N/a
1987	Indianapolis	United States	8 / 11	United States	Cuba	—N/a
1991	Havana	Cuba	8 / 13	Cuba	Cuba	—N/a
1995	Mar del Plata	Argentina	8 / 13	United States	Cuba	—N/a
1999	Winnipeg	Canada	8 / 8	Cuba	Canada	—N/a
2003	Santo Domingo	Dominican Republic	8 / 14	Cuba	United States	—N/a
2007	Rio de Janeiro	Brazil	9 / 15	United States	Canada	Canada
2011	Guadalajara	Mexico	9 / 15	United States	United States	Canada
2015	Toronto	Canada	9 / 15	United States	United States	Canada
2019	Lima	Peru	9 / 15	Brazil	United States	Canada
2023	Santiago	Chile	10 / 16	United States	Brazil	United States

== Events ==
Events	Editions																			Years
Events	Argentina	Mexico	USA	Brazil	Canada	Colombia	Mexico	Puerto Rico	Venezuela	USA	Cuba	Argentina	Canada	Dominican Republic	Brazil	Mexico	Canada	Peru	Chile	Years
Events	1951	1955	1959	1963	1967	1971	1975	1979	1983	1987	1991	1995	1999	2003	2007	2011	2015	2019	2023	Years
Artistic gymnastics
Men's team	•	•	•	•	•	•	•	•	•	•	•	•	•	•	•	•	•	•	•	19
Men's all-around	•	•	•	•	•	•	•	•	•	•	•	•	•	•	•	•	•	•	•	19
Men's floor exercise	•	•	•	•	•	•	•	•	•	•	•	•	•	•	•	•	•	•	•	19
Men's pommel horse	•	•	•	•	•	•	•	•	•	•	•	•	•	•	•	•	•	•	•	19
Men's still rings	•	•	•	•	•	•	•	•	•	•	•	•	•	•	•	•	•	•	•	19
Men's vault	•	•	•	•	•	•	•	•	•	•	•	•	•	•	•	•	•	•	•	19
Men's parallel bars	•	•	•	•	•	•	•	•	•	•	•	•	•	•	•	•	•	•	•	19
Men's horizontal bar	•	•	•	•	•	•	•	•	•	•	•	•	•	•	•	•	•	•	•	19
Women's team			•	•	•	•	•	•	•	•	•	•	•	•	•	•	•	•	•	17
Women's all-around			•	•	•	•	•	•	•	•	•	•	•	•	•	•	•	•	•	17
Women's vault			•	•	•	•	•	•	•	•	•	•	•	•	•	•	•	•	•	17
Women's uneven bars			•	•	•	•	•	•	•	•	•	•	•	•	•	•	•	•	•	17
Women's balance beam			•	•	•	•	•	•	•	•	•	•	•	•	•	•	•	•	•	17
Women's floor exercise			•	•	•	•	•	•	•	•	•	•	•	•	•	•	•	•	•	17
Men's team floor exercise	•	•																		2
Men's team pommel horse	•	•																		2
Men's team still rings	•	•																		2
Men's team vault	•	•																		2
Men's team parallel bars	•	•																		2
Men's team horizontal bar	•	•																		2
Club swinging
Men's club swinging		•	•																	2
Rhythmic gymnastics
Individual all-around										•	•	•	•	•	•	•	•	•	•	10
Group all-around											•	•	•	•	•	•	•	•	•	10
Individual clubs										•	•	•		•	•	•	•	•	•	10
Individual ribbon										•		•		•	•	•	•	•	•	8
Individual hoop										•	•			•	•	•	•	•	•	8
Individual ball											•	•		•		•	•	•	•	7
Group single apparatus														•	•	•	•	•	•	6
Group mixed apparatus														•	•	•	•	•	•	6
Individual rope										•	•	•			•					4
Team											•	•								2
Rope climbing
Men's rope climbing		•	•																	2
Trampoline and tumbling
Men's individual trampoline		•	•												•	•	•	•	•	7
Women's individual trampoline															•	•	•	•	•	5
Men's individual tumbling		•	•																	2
Men's synchronized trampoline																			•	1
Women's synchronized trampoline																			•	1
Total events	14	18	18	14	14	14	14	14	14	19	21	21	16	22	24	24	24	24	26	

== All-time medal table ==
=== Artistic gymnastics ===
- Includes medals earned in artistic gymnastics, rope climbing and club swinging events

Men's and women's events (1951–2023)
Rank	Nation	Gold	Silver	Bronze	Total
1	United States	132	111	94	337
2	Cuba	73	65	50	188
3	Canada	27	34	43	104
4	Brazil	17	23	27	67
5	Mexico	8	8	23	39
6	Argentina	7	10	17	34
7	Colombia	4	8	10	22
8	Venezuela	4	4	3	11
9	Puerto Rico	3	4	10	17
10	Guatemala	2	2	2	6
11	Dominican Republic	2	1	0	3
12	Chile	1	3	2	6
13	Peru	0	0	1	1
Totals (13 entries)		280	273	282	835

=== Rhythmic gymnastics ===
- Includes medals earned in individual and group events

Individual and group events (1987–2023)
Rank	Nation	Gold	Silver	Bronze	Total
1	United States	25	25	21	71
2	Brazil	21	8	12	41
3	Cuba	12	12	7	31
4	Canada	6	14	19	39
5	Mexico	4	9	8	21
6	Argentina	1	1	5	7
Totals (6 entries)		69	69	72	210

=== Trampoline ===
- Includes medals earned in trampoline and tumbling

Men's and women's events (1955–1959, 2007–2023)
Rank	Nation	Gold	Silver	Bronze	Total
1	United States	8	8	5	21
2	Canada	7	3	1	11
3	Colombia	1	0	1	2
4	Brazil	0	4	2	6
5	Mexico	0	1	4	5
6	Argentina	0	0	2	2
7	Venezuela	0	0	1	1
Totals (7 entries)		16	16	16	48

=== Combined total ===
Updated after the 2023 Pan American Games.

Rank	Nation	Gold	Silver	Bronze	Total
1	United States	165	144	120	429
2	Cuba	85	77	57	219
3	Canada	40	51	63	154
4	Brazil	38	35	41	114
5	Mexico	12	18	35	65
6	Argentina	8	11	24	43
7	Colombia	5	8	11	24
8	Venezuela	4	4	4	12
9	Puerto Rico	3	4	10	17
10	Guatemala	2	2	2	6
11	Dominican Republic	2	1	0	3
12	Chile	1	3	2	6
13	Peru	0	0	1	1
Totals (13 entries)		365	358	370	1,093

== See also ==
- List of Pan American Games medalists in gymnastics
- Pan American Gymnastics Championships
- Gymnastics at the Central American and Caribbean Games
- Gymnastics at the South American Games
- South American Gymnastics Championships
