= Gymnastics at the 1955 Pan American Games =

Men's gymnastics events were held at the 1955 Pan American Games in Mexico City, Mexico.

== Medal table ==
* Host nation (Mexico)

Rank	NOC	Gold	Silver	Bronze	Total
1	United States	18	9	8	35
2	Mexico*	1	0	0	1
3	Cuba	0	7	3	10
4	Argentina	0	2	7	9
5	Venezuela	0	0	1	1
Totals (5 entries)		19	18	19	56

== Medalists ==
=== Artistic gymnastics ===
==== Men's events ====
Event	Gold	Silver	Bronze
Individual all-around	John Beckner; United States	Joseph Kotys; United States	Jack Miles; United States
Team all-around	United States; John Beckner; Joseph Kotys; Jack Miles; Abraham Grossfeld; Donald Holder; Richard Beckner	Cuba; Rafael Lecuona; Luis Santana; Francisco Cascante; Baldomero Rubiera; Ángel Franco; Roberto Villacián	Argentina; Juan Caviglia; Ovidio Ferrari; Cesar Bonoris; Enrique Rapesta; Joaquín Zbikowski; Jaroslav Slanina
Floor exercise	John Beckner; United States	Joseph Kotys; United States	Juan Caviglia; Argentina Abraham Grossfeld; United States
Pommel horse	John Beckner; United States	Rafael Lecuona; Cuba	Joseph Kotys; United States
Rings	Richard Beckner; United States	Donald Holder; United States	Jack Miles; United States Abraham Grossfeld; United States
Vault	Joseph Kotys; United States	Jack Miles; United States Donald Holder; United States	—
Parallel bars	John Beckner; United States Richard Beckner; United States	—	Abraham Grossfeld; United States
Horizontal bar	Abraham Grossfeld; United States	Jack Miles; United States	Joseph Kotys; United States
Team floor exercise	United States; John Beckner; Joseph Kotys; Jack Miles; Abraham Grossfeld; Donald Holder; Richard Beckner	Cuba; Rafael Lecuona; Luis Santana; Francisco Cascante; Baldomero Rubiera; Ángel Franco; Roberto Villacián	Argentina; Juan Caviglia; Ovidio Ferrari; Cesar Bonoris; Enrique Rapesta; Joaquín Zbikowski; Jaroslav Slanina
Team pommel horse	United States; John Beckner; Joseph Kotys; Jack Miles; Abraham Grossfeld; Donald Holder; Richard Beckner	Cuba; Rafael Lecuona; Luis Santana; Francisco Cascante; Baldomero Rubiera; Ángel Franco; Roberto Villacián	Argentina; Juan Caviglia; Ovidio Ferrari; Cesar Bonoris; Enrique Rapesta; Joaquín Zbikowski; Jaroslav Slanina
Team rings	United States; John Beckner; Joseph Kotys; Jack Miles; Abraham Grossfeld; Donald Holder; Richard Beckner	Cuba; Rafael Lecuona; Luis Santana; Francisco Cascante; Baldomero Rubiera; Ángel Franco; Roberto Villacián	Argentina; Juan Caviglia; Ovidio Ferrari; Cesar Bonoris; Enrique Rapesta; Joaquín Zbikowski; Jaroslav Slanina
Team vault	United States; John Beckner; Joseph Kotys; Jack Miles; Abraham Grossfeld; Donald Holder; Richard Beckner	Argentina; Juan Caviglia; Ovidio Ferrari; Cesar Bonoris; Enrique Rapesta; Joaquín Zbikowski; Jaroslav Slanina	Cuba; Rafael Lecuona; Luis Santana; Francisco Cascante; Baldomero Rubiera; Ángel Franco; Roberto Villacián
Team parallel bars	United States; John Beckner; Joseph Kotys; Jack Miles; Abraham Grossfeld; Donald Holder; Richard Beckner	Cuba; Rafael Lecuona; Luis Santana; Francisco Cascante; Baldomero Rubiera; Ángel Franco; Roberto Villacián	Argentina; Juan Caviglia; Ovidio Ferrari; Cesar Bonoris; Enrique Rapesta; Joaquín Zbikowski; Jaroslav Slanina
Team horizontal bar	United States; John Beckner; Joseph Kotys; Jack Miles; Abraham Grossfeld; Donald Holder; Richard Beckner	Argentina; Juan Caviglia; Ovidio Ferrari; Cesar Bonoris; Enrique Rapesta; Joaquín Zbikowski; Jaroslav Slanina	Cuba; Rafael Lecuona; Luis Santana; Francisco Cascante; Baldomero Rubiera; Ángel Franco; Roberto Villacián

== Club swinging ==
Event	Gold	Silver	Bronze
Men's club swinging	Francisco Alvarez; Mexico	Donald Holder; United States	Jack Miles; United States

== Rope climbing ==
Event	Gold	Silver	Bronze
Men's rope climbing	Donald Perry; United States	Baldomero Rubiera; Cuba	Roberto Villacián; Cuba

== Trampoline and tumbling ==
Event	Gold	Silver	Bronze
Men's individual trampoline	Donald Harper; United States	William Roy; United States	Eduardo Fereda; Venezuela
Men's individual tumbling	William Roy; United States	Joseph Kotys; United States	Juan Caviglia; Argentina

== See also ==
- Pan American Gymnastics Championships
- South American Gymnastics Championships
- Gymnastics at the 1956 Summer Olympics
