= Pan American Artistic Gymnastics Championships – Men's pommel horse =

The Pan American Gymnastics Championships were first held in 1997.

Three medals are awarded: gold for first place, silver for second place, and bronze for third place.

== Medalists ==
Year	Location	Gold	Silver	Bronze	Ref
1997	(Colombia) Medellín	(Cuba) Erick López	(United States) Jay Thornton	(Colombia) Jorge Hugo Giraldo	
2001	(Mexico) Cancún	(Puerto Rico) Luis Vargas Velásquez	(Cuba) Erick López	(Venezuela) Carycel Briceno	
2004	(Venezuela) Maracaibo	(Venezuela) Johny Parra Marana	(Puerto Rico) Alexander Rodríguez	(Brazil) Mosiah Rodrigues	
2005	(Brazil) Rio de Janeiro	(Puerto Rico) Luis Rivera	(Puerto Rico) Luis Vargas Velásquez	(Cuba) Abel Driggs Santos	
2008	(Argentina) Rosario	(Venezuela) José Luis Fuentes	(United States) Danell Leyva	(Puerto Rico) Rafael Morales	
2010	(Mexico) Guadalajara	(United States) Glen Ishino	(Mexico) Jorge Peña	(Canada) Casey Sandy	
2012	(Colombia) Medellín	(Venezuela) José Luis Fuentes	(Colombia) Jhonny Muñoz	(Puerto Rico) Luis Rivera	
2013	(Puerto Rico) San Juan	(Brazil) Sérgio Sasaki	(Colombia) Jorge Hugo Giraldo	(Brazil) Pericles Silva	
2014	(Canada) Mississauga	(Mexico) Daniel Corral	(United States) Marvin Kimble	(Puerto Rico) Alexander Rodríguez	
2016	(Bolivia) Sucre	(Brazil) Fellipe Arakawa	(Ecuador) Israel Chiriboga	(Mexico) Jorge Íñigo	
2017	(Peru) Lima	(Canada) Zachary Clay	(Brazil) Caio Souza	(Colombia) Erick Vargas	
2018	(Peru) Lima	(United States) Genki Suzuki	(Cuba) Manrique Larduet (United States) Cameron Bock	—N/a	
2021	(Brazil) Rio de Janeiro	(Argentina) Santiago Mayol	(Colombia) Javier Sandoval	(Brazil) Francisco Barretto Júnior	
2022	(Brazil) Rio de Janeiro	(United States) Yul Moldauer	(Canada) Jayson Rampersad	(Colombia) Andrés Martínez	
2023	(Colombia) Medellín	(United States) Khoi Young	(Puerto Rico) Nelson Guilbe	(United States) Yul Moldauer	
2024	(Colombia) Santa Marta	(Brazil) Diogo Soares	(Peru) Edward Alarcón	(Argentina) Luca Alfieri	
2025	Panama City	(United States) Brandon Dang	(United States) Joshua Karnes	(Jamaica) Elel Wahrmann-Baker	
2026	(Brazil) Rio de Janeiro	(United States) Patrick Hoopes	(Canada) Jordan Carroll	(Colombia) Ángel Barajas	

== Medal table ==
Rank	Nation	Gold	Silver	Bronze	Total
1	United States (USA)	6	5	1	12
2	Brazil (BRA)	3	1	3	7
3	Venezuela (VEN)	3	0	1	4
4	Puerto Rico (PUR)	2	3	3	8
5	Canada (CAN)	1	2	1	4
5	Cuba (CUB)	1	2	1	4
7	Mexico (MEX)	1	1	1	3
8	Argentina (ARG)	1	0	1	2
9	Colombia (COL)	0	3	4	7
10	Ecuador (ECU)	0	1	0	1
10	Peru (PER)	0	1	0	1
12	Jamaica (JAM)	0	0	1	1
Totals (12 entries)		18	19	17	54
