= Gymnastics at the 1951 Pan American Games =

Men's artistic gymnastics events were held at the 1951 Pan American Games in Buenos Aires, Argentina.

== Medal table ==
* Host nation (Argentina)

Rank	NOC	Gold	Silver	Bronze	Total
1	Cuba	6	6	3	15
2	Argentina*	6	5	5	16
3	United States	2	2	0	4
4	Mexico	0	1	6	7
Totals (4 entries)		14	14	14	42

== Medalists ==
=== Artistic gymnastics ===
==== Men's events ====
Event	Gold	Silver	Bronze
Individual all-around	William Roetzheim; United States	Rafael Lecuona; Cuba	Juan Caviglia; Argentina
Team all-around	Argentina; Mario Fizbein; Ovidio Ferrari; César Bonoris; Jorge Soler; Enrique Rapesta; Pedro Lonchibucco; Juan Caviglia; Roberto Nuñez	Cuba; José Vázquez; Raimundo Rey; Francisco Cascante; Baldomero Rubiera; Roberto Villacián; Fernando Lecuona; Ángel Aguiar; Rafael Lecuona	Mexico; José Savignon; Manuel Ortiz; Carlos Duarte; José Rosellón; Rubén Lira; Guillermo Yáñez; Manuel Guzmán; Everardo Peña
Floor exercise	Juan Caviglia; Argentina	William Roetzheim; United States	Francisco Cascante; Cuba
Pommel horse	Rafael Lecuona; Cuba	William Roetzheim; United States	Ovidio Ferrari; Argentina
Rings	Ángel Aguiar; Cuba	Fernando Lecuona; Cuba	Roberto Villacián; Cuba
Vault	Ángel Aguiar; Cuba	Rafael Lecuona; Cuba	Ovidio Ferrari; Argentina
Parallel bars	Pedro Lonchibucco; Argentina	Enrique Rapesta; Argentina	Juan Caviglia; Argentina
Horizontal bar	William Roetzheim; United States	Juan Caviglia; Argentina	César Bonoris; Argentina
Team floor exercise	Argentina; Mario Fizbein; Ovidio Ferrari; César Bonoris; Jorge Soler; Enrique Rapesta; Pedro Lonchibucco; Juan Caviglia; Roberto Nuñez	Cuba; José Vázquez; Raimundo Rey; Francisco Cascante; Baldomero Rubiera; Roberto Villacián; Fernando Lecuona; Ángel Aguiar; Rafael Lecuona	Mexico; José Savignon; Manuel Ortiz; Carlos Duarte; José Rosellón; Rubén Lira; Guillermo Yáñez; Manuel Guzmán; Everardo Peña
Team pommel horse	Argentina; Mario Fizbein; Ovidio Ferrari; César Bonoris; Jorge Soler; Enrique Rapesta; Pedro Lonchibucco; Juan Caviglia; Roberto Nuñez	Cuba; José Vázquez; Raimundo Rey; Francisco Cascante; Baldomero Rubiera; Roberto Villacián; Fernando Lecuona; Ángel Aguiar; Rafael Lecuona	Mexico; José Savignon; Manuel Ortiz; Carlos Duarte; José Rosellón; Rubén Lira; Guillermo Yáñez; Manuel Guzmán; Everardo Peña
Team rings	Cuba; José Vázquez; Raimundo Rey; Francisco Cascante; Baldomero Rubiera; Roberto Villacián; Fernando Lecuona; Ángel Aguiar; Rafael Lecuona	Argentina; Mario Fizbein; Ovidio Ferrari; César Bonoris; Jorge Soler; Enrique Rapesta; Pedro Lonchibucco; Juan Caviglia; Roberto Nuñez	Mexico; José Savignon; Manuel Ortiz; Carlos Duarte; José Rosellón; Rubén Lira; Guillermo Yáñez; Manuel Guzmán; Everardo Peña
Team vault	Cuba; José Vázquez; Raimundo Rey; Francisco Cascante; Baldomero Rubiera; Roberto Villacián; Fernando Lecuona; Ángel Aguiar; Rafael Lecuona	Argentina; Mario Fizbein; Ovidio Ferrari; César Bonoris; Jorge Soler; Enrique Rapesta; Pedro Lonchibucco; Juan Caviglia; Roberto Nuñez	Mexico; José Savignon; Manuel Ortiz; Carlos Duarte; José Rosellón; Rubén Lira; Guillermo Yáñez; Manuel Guzmán; Everardo Peña
Team parallel bars	Cuba; José Vázquez; Raimundo Rey; Francisco Cascante; Baldomero Rubiera; Roberto Villacián; Fernando Lecuona; Ángel Aguiar; Rafael Lecuona	Argentina; Mario Fizbein; Ovidio Ferrari; César Bonoris; Jorge Soler; Enrique Rapesta; Pedro Lonchibucco; Juan Caviglia; Roberto Nuñez	Mexico; José Savignon; Manuel Ortiz; Carlos Duarte; José Rosellón; Rubén Lira; Guillermo Yáñez; Manuel Guzmán; Everardo Peña
Team horizontal bar	Argentina; Mario Fizbein; Ovidio Ferrari; César Bonoris; Jorge Soler; Enrique Rapesta; Pedro Lonchibucco; Juan Caviglia; Roberto Nuñez	Mexico; José Savignon; Manuel Ortiz; Carlos Duarte; José Rosellón; Rubén Lira; Guillermo Yáñez; Manuel Guzmán; Everardo Peña	Cuba; José Vázquez; Raimundo Rey; Francisco Cascante; Baldomero Rubiera; Roberto Villacián; Fernando Lecuona; Ángel Aguiar; Rafael Lecuona

== See also ==
- Pan American Gymnastics Championships
- South American Gymnastics Championships
- Gymnastics at the 1952 Summer Olympics
