= Gymnastics at the 1971 Pan American Games =

Gymnastics events were competed at the 1971 Pan American Games in Cali, Colombia.

== Medal table ==
* Host nation (Colombia)

| Rank | NOC | Gold | Silver | Bronze | Total |
|---|---|---|---|---|---|
| 1 | United States | 9 | 9 | 10 | 28 |
| 2 | Cuba | 5 | 5 | 4 | 14 |
| 3 | Canada | 0 | 0 | 5 | 5 |
| Totals (3 entries) | | 14 | 14 | 19 | 47 |

== Medalists ==
=== Men's events ===
| Event | Gold | Silver | Bronze |
|---|---|---|---|
| Individual all-around | Jorge Rodriguez; Cuba | John Crosby; United States | Jorge Cuervo; Cuba |
| Team all-around | Cuba; Jorge Rodríguez; Jorge Cuervo; Emilio Sagre; René Badell; Miguel García; Luis Ramirez | United States; Gary Anderson; David Butzman; John Crosby; John Ellas; Thomas Lindner; Brent Simmons | Canada; Sidney Jensen; Andre Simard; Steplien Mitruk; Ivan Boisclair; Richard Bigras; Ronald Hunter |
| Floor exercise | John Crosby; United States | Jorge Rodriguez; Cuba | Emilio Sagre; Cuba |
| Pommel horse | Jorge Rodriguez; Cuba | John Crosby; United States | John Ellas; United States |
| Rings | John Crosby; United States | John Ellas; United States | Jorge Rodriguez; Cuba Andre Simard; Canada |
| Vault | Jorge Cuervo; Cuba | Jorge Rodriguez; Cuba | John Crosby; United States |
| Parallel bars | John Ellas; United States | John Crosby; United States | David Butzman; United States |
| Horizontal bar | Jorge Rodriguez; Cuba | John Crosby; United States | Jorge Cuervo; Cuba Brent Simmons; United States |

=== Women's events ===
| Event | Gold | Silver | Bronze |
|---|---|---|---|
| Individual all-around | Roxanne Pierce; United States | Linda Metheny; United States | Kim Chace; United States |
| Team all-around | United States; Kim Chace; Theresa Fileccia; Adele Gleaves; Linda Metheny; Roxanne Pierce; Terry Spencer | Cuba; Vivian Garcia; Miriam Villacián; Nancy Aldama; Suzette Blanco; Vicenta Cruzata; Zulema Bregado | Canada; Lise Arsenault; Jennifer Diachun; Nancy McDonnell; Teresa McDonnell; Lise Cullete; Micheline Turcotte |
| Vault | Roxanne Pierce; United States | Miriam Villacián; Cuba | Adele Gleaves; United States |
| Uneven bars | Roxanne Pierce; United States | Linda Metheny; United States | Kim Chace; United States |
| Balance beam | Kim Chace; United States | Vivian Garcia; Cuba | Linda Metheny; United States Roxanne Pierce; United States |
| Floor exercise | Linda Metheny; United States | Kim Chace; United States | Lise Arsenault; Canada Jennifer Diachun; Canada Roxanne Pierce; United States |

== See also ==
- Pan American Gymnastics Championships
- South American Gymnastics Championships
- Gymnastics at the 1972 Summer Olympics
