= Pan American Artistic Gymnastics Championships – Men's horizontal bar =

The Pan American Gymnastics Championships were first held in 1997.

Three medals are awarded: gold for first place, silver for second place, and bronze for third place.

== Medalists ==
Year	Location	Gold	Silver	Bronze	Ref
1997	(Colombia) Medellín	(United States) Aaron Cotter	(Colombia) Alexander Rangel	(Cuba) Lazaro Lamelas Ramirez	
2001	(Mexico) Cancún	(Colombia) Jesús Romero	(Cuba) Lazaro Lamelas Ramirez	(Puerto Rico) Luis Vargas Velásquez	
2004	(Venezuela) Maracaibo	(Venezuela) Carycel Briceño	(Venezuela) Johny Parra Marana	(United States) Jonathan Horton	
2005	(Brazil) Rio de Janeiro	(Brazil) Mosiah Rodrigues	(Puerto Rico) Luis Vargas Velásquez	(United States) Joseph Hagerty	
2008	(Argentina) Rosario	(United States) Danell Leyva	(Venezuela) José Luis Fuentes	(Argentina) Lucas Chiarlo	
2010	(Mexico) Guadalajara	(United States) Alexander Buscaglia	(Venezuela) José Luis Fuentes	(United States) Wesley Haagensen	
2012	(Colombia) Medellín	(Argentina) Nicolas Cordoba	(Brazil) Sérgio Sasaki (Puerto Rico) Angel Ramos	—N/a	
2013	(Puerto Rico) San Juan	(Colombia) Jossimar Calvo	(Argentina) Nicolás Córdoba	(Brazil) Francisco Barretto Júnior	
2014	(Canada) Mississauga	(Colombia) Jossimar Calvo	(Brazil) Sérgio Sasaki (Cuba) Manrique Larduet	—N/a	
2016	(Bolivia) Sucre	(Colombia) Didier Lugo	(Argentina) Osvaldo Martinez	(Chile) Christian Bruno	
2017	(Peru) Lima	(Dominican Republic) Audrys Nin Reyes	(Mexico) Kevin Cerda	(Brazil) Caio Souza	
2018	(Peru) Lima	(Brazil) Caio Souza	(Brazil) Francisco Barretto Júnior	(Cuba) Randy Lerú	
2021	(Brazil) Rio de Janeiro	(Colombia) Javier Sandoval	(Colombia) José Martínez	(Argentina) Santiago Mayol	
2022	(Brazil) Rio de Janeiro	(United States) Brody Malone	(Brazil) Caio Souza	(Brazil) Arthur Mariano	
2023	(Colombia) Medellín	(United States) Curran Phillips	(United States) Yul Moldauer	(Chile) Luciano Letelier	
2024	(Colombia) Santa Marta	(Brazil) Diogo Soares	(Brazil) Caio Souza	(Mexico) Joseph Solís	
2025	Panama City	(Canada) Félix Dolci	(United States) Joshua Karnes	(Canada) Evgeny Siminiuc	
2026	(Brazil) Rio de Janeiro	(Colombia) Ángel Barajas	(Brazil) Diogo Soares	(Canada) Félix Dolci (Brazil) Arthur Mariano	

== Medal table ==
Rank	Nation	Gold	Silver	Bronze	Total
1	Colombia (COL)	6	2	0	8
2	United States (USA)	5	2	3	10
3	Brazil (BRA)	3	6	4	13
4	Venezuela (VEN)	1	3	0	4
5	Argentina (ARG)	1	2	2	5
6	Canada (CAN)	1	0	2	3
7	Dominican Republic (DOM)	1	0	0	1
8	Cuba (CUB)	0	2	2	4
9	Puerto Rico (PUR)	0	2	1	3
10	Mexico (MEX)	0	1	1	2
11	Chile (CHI)	0	0	2	2
Totals (11 entries)		18	20	17	55
