= Villacián =

Villacián is a surname. Notable people with the surname include:

- Miriam Villacián (born 1950), Cuban gymnast
- Roberto Villacián (1928–2003), Cuban gymnast
