= Gymnastics at the 1963 Pan American Games =

Gymnastics events were competed at the 1963 Pan American Games in São Paulo, Brazil.

== Medal table ==
* Host nation (Brazil)

Rank	NOC	Gold	Silver	Bronze	Total
1	United States	11	7	7	25
2	Canada	3	7	3	13
3	Cuba	0	1	3	4
Totals (3 entries)		14	15	13	42

== Medalists ==
=== Men's events ===
Event	Gold	Silver	Bronze
Individual all-around	Wilhelm Weiler; Canada	Don Tonry; United States	Jay Werner; United States
Team all-around	United States; Jay Warner; Donald Tonry; Fred Orlofsky; Abraham Grossfeld; Garland O'Quinn; Jamile Ashmore	Canada; Richard Montpetit; Wilhelm Weiler; Roger Dion; Ivan Boisclair; Nino Marion	Cuba; Octavio Suarez; Hector Ramirez; Andres Gonzalez; Felix Padrón; Luis de Pablo; Juan Pizarro
Floor exercise	Wilhelm Weiler; Canada	Héctor Ramírez; Cuba	Donald Tonry; United States
Horizontal bar	Abie Grossfeld; United States	Wilhelm Weiler; Canada	Jay Werner; United States
Parallel bars	Donald Tonry; United States	Wilhelm Weiler; Canada	Garland O'Quinn; United States
Pommel horse	Garland O'Quinn; United States	Wilhelm Weiler; Canada	Richard Montpetit; Canada
Rings	Jay Ashmore; United States	Abie Grossfeld; United States	Wilhelm Weiler; Canada
Vault	Wilhelm Weiler; Canada	Jay Werner; United States	Donald Tonry; United States

=== Women's events ===
Event	Gold	Silver	Bronze
Individual all-around	Doris Fuchs; United States	Dale McClements; United States Kathleen Corrigan; United States	—
Team all-around	United States; Doris Fuchs; Dale McClements; Kathleen Corrigan; Avis Tieber; Marie Walther; Muriel Grossfeld	Canada; Gail Daley; Dorothy Haworth; Susan McDonnell; Maureen McDonald; Leissa Kroll	Cuba; Yolanda Williams; Julia Uria; Nancy Aldama; Yolanda Vega; Lilia Wong; Toren Oliva
Balance beam	Doris Fuchs; United States	Dorothy Haworth; Canada	Gail Daley; Canada
Floor exercise	Avis Tieber; United States	Susan McDonnell; Canada	Kathleen Corrigan; United States
Uneven bars	Doris Fuchs; United States	Dale McClements; United States	Yolanda Williams; Cuba
Vault	Dale McClements; United States	Avis Tieber; United States	Kathleen Corrigan; United States

== See also ==
- Pan American Gymnastics Championships
- South American Gymnastics Championships
- Gymnastics at the 1964 Summer Olympics
