= Gymnastics at the 2023 Pan American Games – Men's artistic individual all-around =

Men's artistic individual all-around at the 2023 Pan American Games
- Venue: Training Center for Collective Sport
- Dates: October 23
- Competitors: 24
- Winning score: 82.531

Medalists
Gold medal	Félix Dolci	Canada
Silver medal	Diogo Soares	Brazil
Bronze medal	Donnell Whittenburg	United States

The men's artistic individual all-around gymnastic event at the 2023 Pan American Games was held on October 23 at the Training Center for Collective Sport in Santiago, Chile. Félix Dolci of Canada became the first Canadian to win the men's all-around title since Wilhelm Weiler did so at the 1963 Pan American Games.

== Results ==
=== Final ===
Rank	Gymnast	Floor (gymnastics)	Pommel horse	Rings (gymnastics)	Vault (gymnastics)	Parallel bars	Horizontal bar	Total
1st place, gold medalist(s)	Félix Dolci (CAN)	14.566	12.333	14.033	14.400	14.366	12.833	82.531
2nd place, silver medalist(s)	Diogo Soares (BRA)	13.400	13.766	13.233	14.033	13.833	13.600	81.865
3rd place, bronze medalist(s)	Donnell Whittenburg (USA)	13.900	12.466	14.566	14.166	13.600	13.066	81.764
4	Cameron Bock (USA)	13.200	13.700	12.766	14.266	14.300	12.466	80.698
5	Audrys Nin Reyes (DOM)	13.233	12.400	13.066	14.600	13.333	13.533	80.165
6	Joel Álvarez (CHI)	13.333	12.266	13.266	13.733	13.666	12.666	78.930
7	Isaac Núñez (MEX)	13.200	12.433	12.900	13.833	13.966	11.733	78.065
8	Andrés Martínez (COL)	13.166	12.100	13.000	13.666	12.933	13.166	78.031
9	Arthur Mariano (BRA)	13.833	11.933	12.500	14.333	10.833	14.500	77.932
10	Santiago Mayol (ARG)	13.766	11.900	12.733	13.566	13.033	12.733	77.731
11	Rodrigo Gómez (MEX)	13.433	12.566	12.866	13.866	12.600	12.400	77.731
12	Julian Jato (ARG)	13.100	11.933	12.833	13.466	13.366	12.966	77.664
13	José López Martínez (PUR)	13.166	12.100	12.900	13.400	13.066	13.000	77.632
14	Diorges Escobar (CUB)	12.166	10.900	12.133	13.833	13.433	13.766	76.231
15	Adickxon Trejo (VEN)	12.533	12.700	12.466	13.700	12.100	12.333	75.832
16	William Émard (CAN)	14.400	12.333	13.733	14.366	11.766	9.066	75.664
17	Andres Perez Gines (PUR)	12.866	12.233	12.366	13.200	11.700	13.100	75.465
18	Daniel Alarcón (PER)	11.400	12.733	13.166	12.766	12.066	12.400	74.531
19	Caleb Faulk (JAM)	12.600	11.666	12.733	12.666	12.000	11.733	73.398
20	Luciano Letelier (CHI)	12.000	12.500	12.333	12.700	11.766	11.866	73.165
21	César López (ECU)	11.333	10.433	13.000	13.500	11.666	12.500	72.432
22	Dilan Jiménez (COL)	12.966	5.533	11.666	13.833	13.700	12.900	70.598
23	Johnny Adrian Valencia (ECU)	12.700	11.733	11.033	12.633	11.500	10.700	70.299
24	Pablo Harold Pozo (CUB)	1.600	11.133	12.000	12.333	13.400	13.200	63.666

=== Qualification ===
Rank	Gymnast	Floor (gymnastics)	Pommel horse	Rings (gymnastics)	Vault (gymnastics)	Parallel bars	Horizontal bar	Total	Results
1	(United States) Cameron Bock	13.466	13.766	13.600	14.533	13.433	13.800	82.598	Q
2	(United States) Donnell Whittenburg	14.233	12.400	14.433	14.066	13.833	13.366	82.331	Q
3	(Brazil) Diogo Soares	13.600	12.900	13.033	14.266	14.100	14.033	81.932	Q
4	(United States) Colt Walker	13.533	12.000	13.633	14.500	14.366	13.666	81.698	–
5	(Brazil) Arthur Mariano	14.066	12.266	12.533	14.633	13.633	14.100	81.231	Q
6	(Canada) William Émard	12.966	12.400	13.666	14.633	13.866	13.300	80.831	Q
7	(Canada) Félix Dolci	14.266	12.000	13.800	14.400	13.400	12.766	80.632	Q
8	(Brazil) Yuri Guimarães	14.100	11.966	12.800	14.300	13.766	13.600	80.532	–
9	(Argentina) Santiago Mayol	14.000	13.866	12.266	13.800	13.400	12.700	80.032	Q
10	(Dominican Republic) Audrys Nin Reyes	13.266	11.900	12.633	14.000	13.600	13.566	78.965	Q
11	(Mexico) Rodrigo Gómez	13.900	13.133	12.800	13.800	12.733	12.433	78.799	Q
12	(Mexico) Isaac Núñez	12.600	11.933	12.800	13.966	14.033	13.233	78.565	Q
13	(Peru) Edward Gonzáles	13.000	13.233	12.266	13.800	13.300	12.533	78.132	Q W
14	(Chile) Joel Álvarez	13.466	12.466	13.166	13.700	12.033	12.900	77.731	Q
15	(Puerto Rico) Andres Perez Ginez	12.433	12.566	11.266	13.433	13.633	13.100	76.431	Q
16	(Argentina) Julian Jato	12.833	12.166	12.366	12.866	13.233	12.966	76.430	Q
17	(Venezuela) Adickxon Trejo	12.433	11.933	12.333	13.533	12.800	12.533	75.565	Q
18	(Chile) Luciano Letelier	13.600	10.766	12.166	13.966	12.833	12.133	75.464	Q
19	(Colombia) Andrés Martínez	12.133	11.633	12.533	13.700	12.166	13.166	75.331	Q
20	(Cuba) Diorges Escobar	10.600	11.133	11.866	13.900	14.166	13.100	74.765	Q
21	(Peru) Daniel Alarcón	12.100	11.133	12.566	13.766	12.300	12.433	74.298	Q
22	(Ecuador) Johnny Adrian Valencia	12.566	12.333	12.466	12.466	12.666	11.600	74.097	Q
22	(Puerto Rico) José López Martínez	11.933	11.800	12.600	12.933	12.866	11.700	73.832	Q
23	(Colombia) Dilan Jiménez	11.400	10.133	12.766	13.433	13.633	12.300	73.665	Q
24	(United States) Vahe Petrosyan	9.833	13.433	12.566	13.833	10.900	12.866	73.431	–
25	(Ecuador) César López	12.500	11.233	13.100	12.200	11.266	12.800	73.099	Q
26	(Jamaica) Caleb Faulk	12.600	10.933	12.766	12.566	12.166	11.466	72.497	Q
27	(Cuba) Pablo Harold Pozo	12.333	11.900	9.666	13.833	11.533	13.066	72.331	R1 S
28	(Cuba) Alejandro de la Cruz	13.366	5.166	13.600	14.200	13.333	12.200	71.865	–
29	(Panama) Richard Atencio	11.766	11.133	11.566	12.933	12.933	11.266	71.597	R2
30	(Bolivia) Oliver Sons Sánchez	11.000	9.200	12.600	13.766	11.300	10.833	68.699	R3
