= Gymnastics at the 1959 Pan American Games =

Gymnastics at the I959 Pan American Games
- Venue: Navy Pier

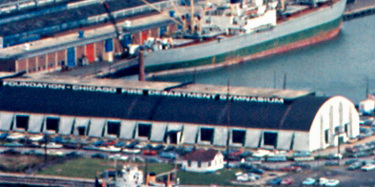
The gymnasium at Navy Pier, where the competition took place

Men's and women's gymnastics events were held at the 1959 Pan American Games in Chicago, United States.

== Medal table ==
* Host nation (United States)

Rank	NOC	Gold	Silver	Bronze	Total
1	United States*	14	11	11	36
2	Canada	4	6	5	15
3	Mexico	1	1	0	2
4	Argentina	0	0	1	1
Totals (4 entries)		19	18	17	54

== Medalists ==
=== Artistic gymnastics ===
==== Men's events ====
Event	Gold	Silver	Bronze
Individual all-around	John Beckner; United States	Abraham Grossfeld; United States	Don Tonry; United States
Team all-around	United States; John Beckner; Donald Tonry; Gregor Weiss; Abraham Grossfeld; Garland O'Quinn; Jamile Ashmore	Canada; Richard Montpetit; Carl Girard; Hans Gerbig; Dieter Weichort; Nino Marion; William Vennels	Argentina; Juan Caviglia; Ricardo Licenziato; Cesar Bonoris; Martín Carranza; Bautista di Giacomo; José Flecha
Floor exercise	Abraham Grossfeld; United States	Jamile Ashmore; United States	Don Tonry; United States
Pommel horse	Gregor Weiss; United States	Richard Montpetit; Canada	John Beckner; United States Garland O'Quinn; United States
Rings	Jamile Ashmore; United States Abraham Grossfeld; United States	—N/a	Nino Marion; Canada
Vault	John Beckner; United States	Richard Montpetit; Canada Gregor Weiss; United States	—N/a
Parallel bars	John Beckner; United States	Gregor Weiss; United States	Don Tonry; United States
Horizontal bar	Abraham Grossfeld; United States	John Beckner; United States	Don Tonry; United States

==== Women's events ====
Event	Gold	Silver	Bronze
Individual all-around	Ernestine Russell; Canada	Betty Maycock; United States	Marie-Claire Larsen; Canada
Team all-around	United States; Betty Maycock; Cassie Collawn; Theresa Montefusco; Sharon Phelps; Judy Klauser; Sharon Richardson	Canada; Ernestine Russell; Marie-Claire Larsen; Louise Parker; Leissa Kroll; Rosemary Ripley; Margaret Schran	—N/a
Vault	Ernestine Russell; Canada	Betty Maycock; United States	Louise Parker; Canada
Uneven bars	Ernestine Russell; Canada	Theresa Montefusco; United States	Marie-Claire Larsen; Canada
Balance beam	Ernestine Russell; Canada	Betty Maycock; United States	Cassie Collawn; United States
Floor exercise	Theresa Montefusco; United States	Ernestine Russell; Canada	Sharon Phelps; United States

=== Club swinging ===
Event	Gold	Silver	Bronze
Men's club swinging	Francisco Alvarez; Mexico	Porfirio Rivera; Mexico	Ronald Munn; United States

=== Rope climbing ===
Event	Gold	Silver	Bronze
Men's rope climbing	Garvin Smith; United States	Nino Marion; Canada	Richard Montpetit; Canada

=== Trampoline and tumbling ===
Event	Gold	Silver	Bronze
Men's individual trampoline	Ronald Munn; United States	Harold Holmes; United States	Abraham Grossfeld; United States
Men's individual tumbling	Harold Holmes; United States	Jamile Ashmore; United States	Abraham Grossfeld; United States

== See also ==
- Pan American Gymnastics Championships
- South American Gymnastics Championships
- Gymnastics at the 1960 Summer Olympics
