= Eduardo Fereda =

Venezuelan diver (1926–1995)

Personal information
- Full name: Jesús Eduardo Jorge Fereda Merchán
- Born: 6 March 1926 Mérida, Venezuela
- Died: 27 August 1995 (aged 69) Caracas, Venezuela

Sport
- Sport: Diving, trampolining
Medal record
Representing Venezuela
Pan American Games
Trampolining
Bronze medal – third place	1955 Mexico City	Men's trampoline
Central American and Caribbean Games
Diving
Bronze medal – third place	1959 Caracas	3m springboard

Jesús Eduardo Jorge Fereda Merchán (Note: In this Spanish name, the first or paternal surname is Fereda and the second or maternal family name is Merchan.) (6 March 1926 – 27 August 1995) was a Venezuelan diver. He competed in the men's 3 metre springboard event at the 1952 Summer Olympics. Fereda died on 27 August 1995, at the age of 69.
