= Tamara Levinson =

American rhythmic gymnast

- Born: November 17, 1976 (age 49) Buenos Aires, Argentina
- Height: 155 cm (5 ft 1 in)

Gymnastics career
- Discipline: Rhythmic gymnastics
- Country represented: United States

Tamara Levinson (born November 17, 1976, Buenos Aires, Argentina) is a dance choreographer and retired American rhythmic gymnast.

She competed for the United States of America in the individual rhythmic gymnastics all-around competition at the 1992 Olympic Games in Barcelona. She was 40th in the qualification round and didn't advance to the final.

After spots, she began work as a dance choreographer; she appeared in Laura Welsh's "Cold Front" video.

She also auditioned and appeared as a dancer in three of Madonna's tours, the Drowned World Tour (2001), the Re-Invention World Tour (2004) and the Confessions Tour (2006).
