= Armando Valles =

Mexican gymnast (born 1941)

- Full name: Armando Valles Montañez
- Born: 6 May 1941 (age 85) Mexico City, Mexico
- Height: 1.70 m (5 ft 7 in)
- Relatives: Fernando Valles (brother)

Gymnastics career
- Discipline: Men's artistic gymnastics
- Country represented: Mexico

Armando Valles Montañez (born 6 May 1941) is a Mexican gymnast. He competed at the 1960 Summer Olympics and the 1968 Summer Olympics.
