= Andrés González (gymnast) =

Cuban gymnast (born 1945)

- Full name: Andrés González Navas
- Born: 4 December 1945 (age 80)

Gymnastics career
- Discipline: Men's artistic gymnastics
- Country represented: Cuba

Andrés González Navas (born 4 December 1945) is a Cuban gymnast. He competed in eight events at the 1964 Summer Olympics.
