= Octavio Suárez =

Cuban gymnast (born 1944)

- Full name: Octavio Juan Suárez Caldzadilla
- Born: 26 July 1944 (age 82) Havana, Cuba

Gymnastics career
- Discipline: Men's artistic gymnastics
- Country represented: Cuba

Octavio Joni Suárez Caldzadilla (born 26 July 1944) is a Cuban gymnast. He competed at the 1964 Summer Olympics and the 1968 Summer Olympics.

Suárez got a bronze medal at the Panamerican Games in 1963 in Sao Pablo for the teams category, and silver for pommel horse. In 1967 he won a silver medal in the teams category at the Panamerican Games in Winnipeg, Canada. At the Centroamerican Games in Panama he won gold at the teams category and bronze at horizontal bar.
