= Héctor Ramírez (gymnast) =

Cuban gymnast (born 1943)

- Full name: Héctor Juan Ramírez Guerra
- Born: 31 January 1943 (age 83) Havana, Cuba

Gymnastics career
- Discipline: Men's artistic gymnastics
- Country represented: Cuba

Héctor Juan Ramírez Guerra (born 31 January 1943) is a Cuban former gymnast. He competed at the 1964 and 1968 Summer Olympics.
