= Roger Dion =

Canadian gymnast (born 1938)

- Full name: Joseph Gaston Roger Dion
- Born: 20 April 1938 Quebec City, Canada

Gymnastics career
- Discipline: Men's artistic gymnastics
- Country represented: Canada

Roger Dion (born 20 April 1938) is a Canadian gymnast. He competed in eight events at the 1968 Summer Olympics.
