= Raimundo Rey =

Cuban gymnast (1925–2013)

- Full name: Raimundo Rey Carcano
- Born: 29 July 1925 Havana, Cuba
- Died: 2 November 2013 (aged 88) Miami, Florida, US

Gymnastics career
- Discipline: Men's artistic gymnastics
- Country represented: Cuba

Raimundo Rey Carcano (29 July 1925 – 2 November 2013) was a Cuban gymnast. He competed in eight events at the 1948 Summer Olympics.
