= Rubén Lira =

Mexican gymnast (1922–1983)

- Full name: Rubén Lira Avilés
- Born: 22 October 1922 Monterrey, Nuevo León, Mexico
- Died: 7 January 1983 (aged 60)

Gymnastics career
- Discipline: Men's artistic gymnastics
- Country represented: Mexico

Rubén Lira Avilés (22 October 1922 – 7 January 1983) was a Mexican gymnast. He competed in eight events at the 1948 Summer Olympics.
