= Jorge Soler (gymnast) =

Argentine gymnast (??–??)

Gymnastics career
- Discipline: Men's artistic gymnastics
- Country represented: Argentina

Jorge Soler was an Argentine gymnast who competed in the 1948 Summer Olympics and the 1951 Pan American Games.
