= Roberto Núñez (gymnast) =

Argentine gymnast (born 1928)

- Born: 1928

Gymnastics career
- Discipline: Men's artistic gymnastics
- Country represented: Argentina

Roberto Núñez (Latin American Spanish: [roˈβeɾto ˈnuɲes]) (born 1928, date of death unknown) was an Argentine gymnast who competed in the 1948 Summer Olympics.
