= Brent Simmons =

- Full name: Brent C. Simmons

Gymnastics career
- Discipline: Men's artistic gymnastics
- Country represented: United States
- College team: Iowa State Cyclones
Medal record
Men's artistic gymnastics
Representing United States
Event	1st	2nd	3rd
Pan American Games	0	1	1
Total	0	1	1
Pan American Games
Silver medal – second place	1971 Cali	Team
Bronze medal – third place	1971 Cali	Horizontal bar
- Awards: Nissen-Emery Award (1971)

Brent C. Simmons is an American former artistic gymnast. He was a United States men's national artistic gymnastics team member and was named to the 1970 and 1974 teams for the World Artistic Gymnastics Championships. He also represented the United States at the 1971 Pan American Games where he won two medals.

== Early life and education ==
Simmons was a native of Columbus, Indiana. He attended Columbus High School and was a standout on the school's boys gymnastics team. With multiple schools pursuing him offering full scholarships, Simmons selected Iowa State University to pursue gymnastics.

== Gymnastics career ==
While at Iowa State, Simmons was a member of the Iowa State Cyclones men's gymnastics team. In his senior season, he was the 1971 NCAA Parallel Bars and Horizontal Bar champion as Iowa State won their first NCAA team championship. He was named the 1971 Nissen-Emery Award winner.

== Legacy ==
Simmons was inducted into the Iowa State Cyclones Hall of Fame in 2002.
