= Pedro Lonchibuco =

Argentine gymnast (c. 1920–1987)

- Born: c. 1920
- Died: June 7, 1987

Gymnastics career
- Discipline: Men's artistic gymnastics
- Country represented: Argentina

Pedro Lonchibuco (c. 1920 – 7 June 1987) was an Argentine gymnast who competed in the 1948 Summer Olympics.
