= Dick Beckner =

American gymnast (1927–1997)

- Full name: Richard Andrew Beckner
- Born: November 24, 1927 Los Angeles, California, U.S.
- Died: September 9, 1997 (aged 69) Lake Elsinore, California, U.S.
- Height: 5 ft 7 in (170 cm)
- Relatives: Jack Beckner (brother)

Gymnastics career
- Discipline: Men's artistic gymnastics
- Country represented: United States
- College team: Los Angeles State College; Los Angeles City College
- Club: Los Angeles Turners; Franklin High School
- Retired: 1958
Medal record
Men's artistic gymnastics
Representing United States
Event	1st	2nd	3rd
Pan American Games	3	0	0
Total	3	0	0
Pan American Games
Gold medal – first place	1955 Mexico City	Team
Gold medal – first place	1955 Mexico City	Rings
Gold medal – first place	1955 Mexico City	Parallel bars

Richard Andrew Beckner (November 24, 1927 – September 9, 1997) was an American gymnast. He was a member of the United States men's national artistic gymnastics team and competed in eight events at the 1956 Summer Olympics.

As a gymnast, Beckner was a member of the Los Angeles Turners Club. His brother, Jack Beckner, was a teammate on the 1956 USA Olympic gymnastics team.

He attended Franklin High School and graduated in 1945. He competed for the high school's gymnastics team under coach Tony Spangler.

He retired from gymnastics in 1958. He later coached gymnastics at El Modena High School.
