= Fernando Valles =

Mexican gymnast (1944–2010)

- Full name: Fernando Valles Montañez
- Born: 9 October 1944 Mexico City, Mexico
- Died: 31 May 2010 (aged 65)
- Height: 1.71 m (5 ft 7 in)
- Relatives: Armando Valles (brother)

Gymnastics career
- Discipline: Men's artistic gymnastics
- Country represented: Mexico

Fernando Valles Montañez was a Mexican artistic gymnast who represented Mexico in international competition during the 1960s and 1970s. He competed at the 1966 World Artistic Gymnastics Championships in Dortmund, won a bronze medal with the Mexican team at the 1967 Pan American Games in Winnipeg, represented Mexico at the 1968 Summer Olympics in Mexico City, and was a member of the Mexican team that won the silver medal at the 1970 Central American and Caribbean Games in Panama City. He was the younger brother of fellow Mexican Olympic gymnast Armando Valles.

== Gymnastics career ==
=== 1966 World Championships ===
Valles represented Mexico at the 1966 World Artistic Gymnastics Championships in Dortmund, West Germany. He was listed 142nd in the published men's all-around results with a total of 37.750 points.

=== 1967 season ===
Valles competed in the pre-Olympic gymnastics competition held in Mexico City in 1967 as part of preparations for the 1968 Summer Olympics. In a 2008 interview, he recalled that he had accumulated only two years of gymnastics preparation by the time of the competition.

In the same interview, Valles recalled suffering a serious shoulder injury during one of his first international competitions in Canada. He said that he dislocated his shoulder while performing on the rings, subsequently underwent surgery, and continued competing despite not feeling fully recovered.

At the 1967 Pan American Games in Winnipeg, Valles was a member of the Mexican men's team that won the bronze medal in the team competition. The Mexican team consisted of Armando Valles, Armando García, Fernando Valles, Rogelio Mendoza, Enrique García and Enrique Salazar.

Valles later identified vault, pommel horse and parallel bars as the apparatuses in which he performed best, and described vault as his favorite event.

=== 1968 Summer Olympics ===
Valles represented Mexico at the 1968 Summer Olympics in Mexico City. He competed in the men's individual all-around, all six individual apparatus events, and the men's team competition.

He finished 104th in the individual all-around with 99.05 points. His best apparatus result was in vault, where he scored 18.00 points and placed equal 68th. He was also equal 73rd on pommel horse with 17.25 points.

Fernando Valles at the 1968 Summer Olympics
Event	Score	Rank
Individual all-around	99.05	104th
Floor exercise	15.80	=106th
Pommel horse	17.25	=73rd
Rings	15.60	105th
Vault	18.00	=68th
Parallel bars	15.65	111th
Horizontal bar	16.75	=101st

Mexico finished 14th in the men's team competition with 518.25 points. The competing team consisted of Armando Valles, Rogelio Mendoza, José Vilchis, José González, Enrique García and Fernando Valles; Enrique Salazar was listed as the substitute.

=== 1970 Central American and Caribbean Games ===
Valles continued representing Mexico after the Olympic Games. At the 1970 Central American and Caribbean Games in Panama City, he was a member of the Mexican men's artistic gymnastics team that won the silver medal.

Mexico scored 516.0 points, finishing behind Cuba. The Mexican team consisted of Fernando Valles, Rogelio Mendoza, Manuel Vargas, Gerardo Araújo, José González and José Vilchis.

== Academic career ==
Outside gymnastics, Valles studied a master's degree in microelectronics at the Escuela Superior de Ingeniería Mecánica y Eléctrica (ESIME), Culhuacán Unit, of the Instituto Politécnico Nacional. In 2008, Gaceta Politécnica reported that he was a professor at ESIME Culhuacán, where he taught subjects including digital signal processing, differential and integral calculus, complex variables, linear algebra, electronics and communications.

Institutional records from the IPN also document Valles's involvement in academic and research work at ESIME Culhuacán during the late 1990s.

== Major results ==
Year	Competition	Location	Event	Result
1966	World Championships	Dortmund, West Germany	Men's all-around	142nd
1967	1967 Pan American Games	Winnipeg, Canada	Men's team	(bronze) Bronze
1968	1968 Summer Olympics	Mexico City, Mexico	Men's team	14th
1968	1968 Summer Olympics	Mexico City, Mexico	Individual all-around	104th
1970	1970 Central American and Caribbean Games	Panama City, Panama	Men's team	(silver) Silver
