= Baldomero Rubiera =

Cuban gymnast (1926–2018)

- Full name: Baldomero Rubiera Fernández
- Born: 24 November 1926 Havana, Cuba
- Died: 2018 (aged 91–92)

Gymnastics career
- Discipline: Men's artistic gymnastics
- Country represented: Cuba

Baldomero Rubiera Fernández (24 November 1926 – 2018) was a Cuban gymnast. He competed in eight events at the 1948 Summer Olympics.
