= Don Holder =

American gymnast

- Full name: Donald Joseph Holder
- Born: September 29, 1928 Jersey City, New Jersey, U.S.
- Died: September 1, 2015 (aged 86)

Gymnastics career
- Discipline: Men's artistic gymnastics
- Country represented: United States
- College team: Florida State Seminoles
- Gym: Swiss Gymnastic Society

Donald Joseph Holder (September 29, 1928 – September 1, 2015) was an American gymnast. He was a member of the United States men's national artistic gymnastics team and competed in eight events at the 1952 Summer Olympics.

Born and raised in Jersey City, New Jersey, Holder attended William L. Dickinson High School and graduated in 1946. As a gymnast, he was a member of the Swiss Gymnastic Society.

He attended Florida State University, where he was chosen to serve as co-captain of the gymnastics team.

Holder was the second college freshman ever named to an Olympics team when selected for the 1952 Summer Olympics following Bill Roetzheim in 1948.
