= Alexander Rodríguez (gymnast) =

Puerto Rican artistic gymnast

Alexander Rodriguez
- Full name: Alexander Rodriguez Colon
- Born: December 21, 1985 (age 40)

Gymnastics career
- Discipline: Men's artistic gymnastics
- Country represented: Puerto Rico (2007)
Medal record
Pan American Games
Silver medal – second place	2011 Guadalajara	Team
Bronze medal – third place	2011 Guadalajara	Floor exercise

Alexander Rodriguez Colon (born December 21, 1985) is a Puerto Rican male artistic gymnast, representing his nation at international competitions. He won an individual bronze medal in the pommel horse at the 2007 Pan American Games and another bronze medal in the floor exercise at the 2011 Pan American Games.
