= Fernando Lecuona =

Cuban gymnast (1926–2020)

- Full name: Fernando Isidro Lecuona Asencio
- Born: 20 October 1926 Havana, Cuba
- Died: 2 January 2020 (aged 93) Ormond Beach, Florida, US

Gymnastics career
- Discipline: Men's artistic gymnastics
- Country represented: Cuba

Fernando Isidro Lecuona Asencio (20 October 1926 – 2 January 2020) was a Cuban gymnast who competed in the 1948 Summer Olympics.
