= Ángel Aguiar =

Cuban gymnast (1926–2008)

- Full name: Ángel Aguiar García
- Born: 7 November 1926 Havana, Cuba
- Died: 9 April 2008 (aged 81) Cape Coral, Florida, US

Gymnastics career
- Discipline: Men's artistic gymnastics
- Country represented: Cuba

Ángel Aguiar García (Note: In this Spanish name, the first or paternal surname is Aguiar and the second or maternal family name is García.) (7 November 1926 – 9 April 2008) was a Cuban gymnast. He competed in the 1948 and 1952 Summer Olympics.
