= Enrique Rapesta =

Argentine gymnast (1919–2009)

- Full name: Enrique Wilson Libertario Rapesta Fabregat
- Born: 12 April 1919 Saladillo, Argentina
- Died: 19 June 2009 (aged 90) Rio de Janeiro, Brazil

Gymnastics career
- Discipline: Men's artistic gymnastics
- Country represented: Argentina

Enrique Wilson Libertario Rapesta Fabregat (April 12, 1919 – June 19, 2009) was an Argentine gymnast who competed in the 1948 Summer Olympics.
