= Gregor Weiss =

American gymnast

- Full name: Gregor Richard Weiss
- Born: February 18, 1941 Newark, New Jersey, U.S.
- Height: 167 cm (5 ft 6 in)

Gymnastics career
- Discipline: Men's artistic gymnastics
- Country represented: United States
- College team: Penn State Nittany Lions
- Gym: Swiss Turners
Medal record
Men's artistic gymnastics
Representing United States
Event	1st	2nd	3rd
Pan American Games	2	2	0
Total	2	2	0
Pan American Games
Gold medal – first place	1959 Chicago	Team
Gold medal – first place	1959 Chicago	Pommel horse
Silver medal – second place	1959 Chicago	Vault
Silver medal – second place	1959 Chicago	Parallel bars

Gregor Richard Weiss (born February 18, 1941) is an American artistic gymnast. He was a member of the United States men's national artistic gymnastics team and represented the United States at the 1964 Summer Olympics, placing 7th in the team event and 59th in the individual all-around. He was a member of the U.S. team at the 1966 World Artistic Gymnastics Championships. In the NCAA, he competed for Penn State University and was the NCAA all-around champion in 1961. He was inducted into the U.S. Gymnastics Hall of Fame in 1991.

A resident of Ridgefield, New Jersey, Weiss graduated from Dwight Morrow High School in nearby Englewood.

Following his graduation from Penn State, Weiss served in the U.S. Air Force while still competing internationally and coached at the United States Air Force Academy. He is the father of Michael Weiss.

== See also ==
- List of Pennsylvania State University Olympians
