= Francisco Cascante =

Cuban gymnast (1928–1999)

- Full name: Francisco Cascante Coba
- Born: 28 June 1928 Havana, Cuba
- Died: 1 August 1999 (aged 71) Miami, Florida, US

Gymnastics career
- Discipline: Men's artistic gymnastics
- Country represented: Cuba

Francisco Cascante Coba (28 June 1928 – 1 August 1999) was a Cuban gymnast. He competed in seven events at the 1952 Summer Olympics.
