= Lázaro Lamelas =

Cuban artistic gymnast (born 1974)

- Full name: Lázaro Lamelas Ramírez
- Born: 1 August 1974 (age 52) Havana, Cuba

Gymnastics career
- Discipline: Men's artistic gymnastics
- Country represented: Cuba (c. 1995–2003)

Lázaro Lamelas Ramírez (born 1 August 1974) is a Cuban male artistic gymnast, representing his nation at international competitions. He participated at the 2000 Summer Olympics. He also competed at world championships, including the 2003 World Artistic Gymnastics Championships.
