= César Bonoris =

Argentine gymnast (1927–2005)

- Born: September 22, 1927
- Died: December 13, 2005 (aged 78)

Gymnastics career
- Discipline: Men's artistic gymnastics
- Country represented: Argentina
Medal record
Men's artistic gymnastics
Representing Argentina
Pan American Games
Gold medal – first place	1951 Buenos Aires	Team
Bronze medal – third place	1951 Buenos Aires	Horizontal bar
South American Championships
Gold medal – first place	1957 Buenos Aires	Team
Gold medal – first place	1957 Buenos Aires	Vault
Bronze medal – third place	1957 Buenos Aires	All-around

César Bonoris (September 22, 1927 – December 13, 2005) was an Argentine gymnast who competed in the 1948 Summer Olympics and the 1952 Summer Olympics.
