= Abel Driggs Santos =

Cuban artistic gymnast (born 1975)

- Born: 12 December 1975 (age 50)

Gymnastics career
- Discipline: Men's artistic gymnastics
- Country represented: Cuba

Abel Driggs Santos (born 12 December 1975) is a Cuban male artistic gymnast, representing his nation at international competitions. He participated at the 2004 Summer Olympics. He also competed at world championships, including the 2003 World Artistic Gymnastics Championships in Anaheim.
