= Bill Roetzheim =

American gymnast

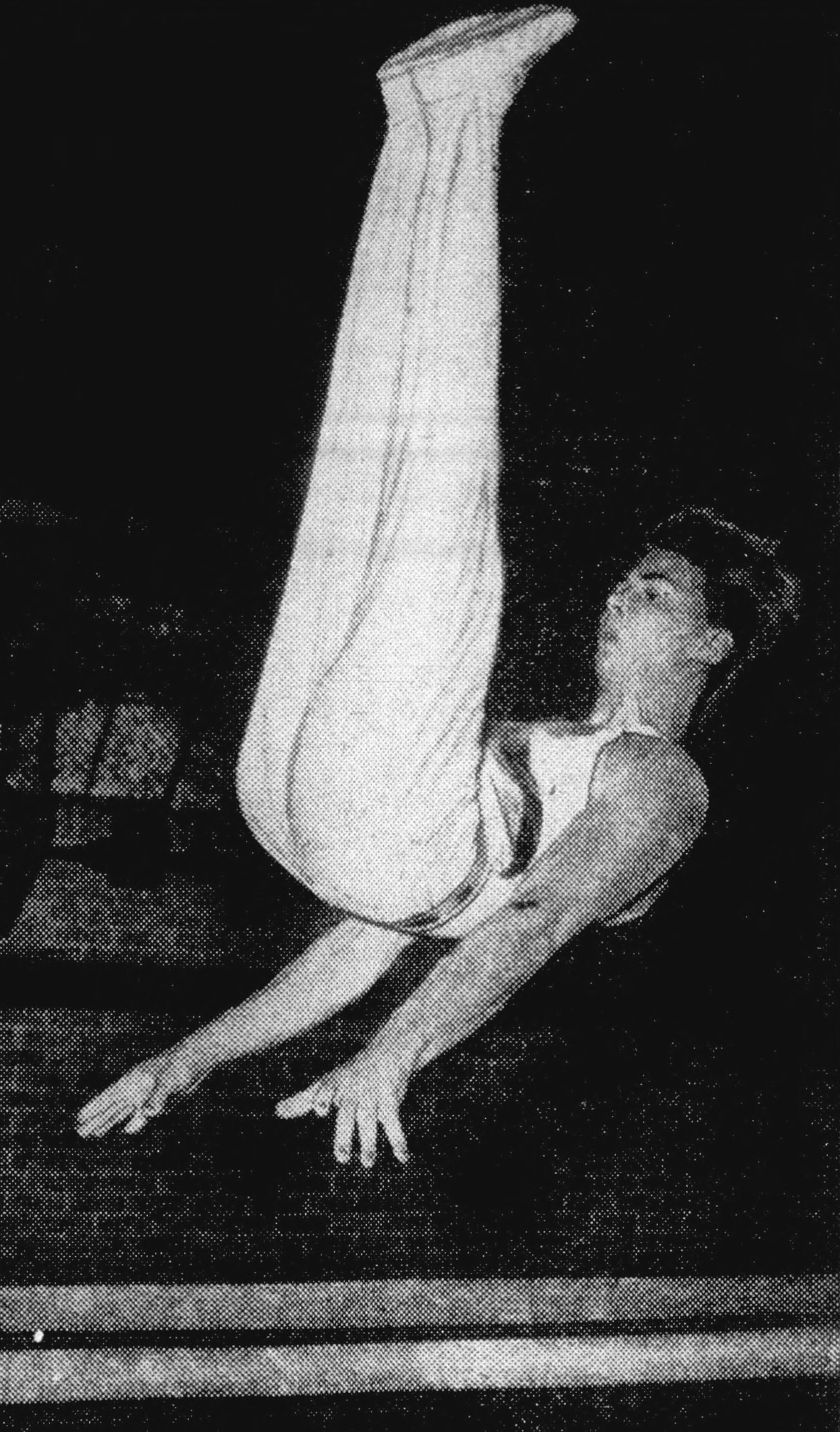
- Roetzheim, circa 1950

Personal information
- Full name: William Henry Roetzheim, Jr.
- Born: August 7, 1928 Chicago, Illinois, U.S.
- Died: February 26, 2014 (aged 85) Plant City, Florida, U.S.

Gymnastics career
- Discipline: Men's artistic gymnastics
- Country represented: United States
- College team: UIC Flames, Florida State Seminoles
Medal record
Representing Florida State Seminoles
Event	1st	2nd	3rd
NCAA Championships	2	0	0
Total	2	0	0
NCAA Championships
Gold medal – first place	1951 Ann Arbor	All-around
Gold medal – first place	1951 Ann Arbor	Horizontal bar
- Coaching career

Coaching career (HC unless noted)
- 1968–1973: Chicago Circle

Administrative career (AD unless noted)
- 1974–1985: UIC Flames

Head coaching record
- Overall: 82–25

William Henry Roetzheim, Jr. (August 7, 1928 – February 26, 2014) was an American gymnast, collegiate coach, and administrator. He was a member of the United States men's national artistic gymnastics team and competed at the 1948 Summer Olympics and the 1952 Summer Olympics. Roetzheim won gold at the 1951 Pan American Games, and he was also an army veteran who served in the Korean War.

== Early life and gymnastics career ==
Roetzheim was born in Chicago, Illinois, in 1928. His career in gymnastics began with the Southside Turners. From there, he attended the Navy Pier campus at the University of Illinois Chicago before going to Florida State University.

At Florida State, he became the NCAA Men's Gymnastics All-Round Champion, and led his school to win the team event. Later the same year, Roetzheim travelled to the 1951 Pan American Games in Buenos Aires at his own expense. At the games, he won two gold medals, in the individual all-around and horizontal bar, along with two silver medals, in the floor and pommel horse. During the 1940s and 1950s, Roetzheim went on to win seven AUU titles.

Roetzheim competed at two Olympic Games. Upon selection to his first, the 1948 Summer Olympics in London, he was the first collegiate freshman to qualify for an Olympic games. He was part of the United States team that finished in seventh place in the team all-round event. Four years later, at the 1952 Summer Olympics in Helsinki, the US team finished in eighth place in the same event.

== Later life and legacy ==
From 1955 to 1968, Roetzheim coached high school gymnastics in Illinois. He had 3 Illinois team championships and a further 19 individual state champions.

In 1968, Roetzheim became the gymnastics coach at the University of Illinois at Chicago Circle, a post he held until 1973. He compiled a record of 82–25 with the team and the following year, he became the athletic director at the university. He oversaw the transition of the school's athletic program to NCAA Division I status in 1981 before leaving the role in 1985.

He was also a judge at four consecutive Summer Olympics from 1984 to 1996.

Roetzheim was inducted into the US Gymnastics Hall of Fame in 1975, the UIC Athletics Hall of Fame in 1990, the National Gymnastics Judges Association Hall of Fame and the Illinois High School Hall of Fame.

Roetzheim died in February 2014 in Plant City, Florida, at the age of 85.
