= Luis Vargas Velásquez =

Puerto Rican gymnast

Luis Vargas
- Full name: Luis Felipe Vargas Velázquez
- Nickname: Tingui
- Born: June 8, 1983 (age 43) Río Piedras, Puerto Rico

Gymnastics career
- Discipline: Men's artistic gymnastics
- Country represented: Puerto Rico (1999–2011)
Medal record
Pan American Games
Silver medal – second place	2011 Guadalajara	Parallel bars
Silver medal – second place	2011 Guadalajara	Team

Luis Felipe Vargas Velázquez (born June 8, 1983) is a Puerto Rican male artistic gymnast and part of the national team. He participated at 2004 Summer Olympics. He also competed at world championships, including the 2010 World Artistic Gymnastics Championships in Rotterdam, the Netherlands.

== Education ==
Luis Vargas completed a Master's Degree in Health Promotion at the University of Turabo (UT) in Puerto Rico, USA.

== See also ==
- List of Pennsylvania State University Olympians
