= Roberto León Richards =

Cuban gymnast (born 1954)

- Full name: Roberto Antonio León Richards Aguilar
- Born: 12 June 1954 (age 72) Cárdenas, Cuba

Gymnastics career
- Discipline: Men's artistic gymnastics
- Country represented: Cuba

Roberto Antonio León Richards Aguilar (born 12 June 1954) is a Cuban gymnast. He competed at the 1972 Summer Olympics, the 1976 Summer Olympics and the 1980 Summer Olympics.
