= Roberto Villacián =

Cuban gymnast (1928–2003)

- Full name: Roberto Villacián Alemany
- Born: 5 September 1928 Havana, Cuba
- Died: 18 February 2003 (aged 74)

Gymnastics career
- Discipline: Men's artistic gymnastics
- Country represented: Cuba

Roberto Villacián Alemany (5 September 1928 – 18 February 2003) was a Cuban gymnast. He competed in eight events at the 1948 Summer Olympics.
