= Casimiro Suárez =

Cuban gymnast (born 1962)

- Full name: Sergio Casimiro Suárez Aimée
- Born: 4 March 1962 (age 64)

Gymnastics career
- Discipline: Men's artistic gymnastics
- Country represented: Cuba

Sergio Casimiro Suárez Aimée (born 4 March 1962) is a retired Cuban gymnast. He competed for Cuba at the 1980 Summer Olympics in the men's individual and team all-around competitions. His best performance was in the horizontal bar portion, where he advanced to the final and finished sixth.

Suarez has been assistant coach of the men's gymnastics team at Ohio State University since 2011.
