= Don Tonry =

American gymnast

- Full name: Donald Robert Tonry
- Born: November 24, 1935 Brooklyn, New York, U.S.
- Died: May 17, 2013 (aged 77) New Haven, Connecticut, U.S.
- Height: 5 ft 7 in (170 cm)

Gymnastics career
- Discipline: Men's artistic gymnastics
- Country represented: United States
- College team: Illinois Fighting Illini
Medal record
Men's artistic gymnastics
Representing United States
Event	1st	2nd	3rd
Pan American Games	2	1	2
Total	2	1	2
Pan American Games
Gold medal – first place	1963 São Paulo	Team
Gold medal – first place	1963 São Paulo	Parallel bars
Silver medal – second place	1963 São Paulo	All-around
Bronze medal – third place	1963 São Paulo	Floor
Bronze medal – third place	1963 São Paulo	Vault

Donald Robert Tonry (November 24, 1935 – May 17, 2013) was an American gymnast. He got his start in professional Gymnastics whilst attending the University of Illinois where he was the NCAA Champion for all-around and floor. He was a member of the United States men's national artistic gymnastics team and competed in eight events at the 1960 Summer Olympics.
