= Abie Grossfeld =

American artistic gymnast (born 1934)

- Full name: Abraham Israel Grossfeld
- Born: March 1, 1934 (age 92) New York City, New York, U.S.
- Height: 175 cm (5 ft 9 in)
- Spouse: Muriel Grossfeld (m. 1960–1966)

Gymnastics career
- Discipline: Men's artistic gymnastics
- Country represented: United States
- College team: Illinois Fighting Illini
- Gym: West Side YMCA
- Former coach: John Van Aalten
Medal record
Men's artistic gymnastics
Representing United States
Event	1st	2nd	3rd
Pan American Games	8	2	3
Total	8	2	3
Pan American Games
Gold medal – first place	1955 Mexico City	Team
Gold medal – first place	1955 Mexico City	Horizontal bar
Gold medal – first place	1959 Chicago	Team
Gold medal – first place	1959 Chicago	Floor
Gold medal – first place	1959 Chicago	Rings
Gold medal – first place	1959 Chicago	Horizontal bar
Gold medal – first place	1963 São Paulo	Team
Gold medal – first place	1963 São Paulo	Horizontal bar
Silver medal – second place	1959 Chicago	All-around
Silver medal – second place	1963 São Paulo	Rings
Bronze medal – third place	1955 Mexico City	Floor
Bronze medal – third place	1955 Mexico City	Rings
Bronze medal – third place	1955 Mexico City	Parallel bars

Abraham Israel "Abie" Grossfeld (pronounced AY-bee; born March 1, 1934) is an American gymnastics coach and former gymnast. Grossfeld represented the United States as a gymnast for 15 consecutive years in 35 countries as a member of 26 international United States men's national artistic gymnastics teams including the Olympic Games, World Championships, and Pan American Games.

== Early life and education ==
Born in New York City, Grossfeld was involved in multiple sports from a young age. He won gold medals in two Jr. Olympic Cycling Championships, (1949–50). He also won the New York City 4 X 50 relay team title at Madison Square Garden in 1949, and the Bronx High School high jump and standing long jump titles in 1949.

Grossfeld joined the West Side YMCA in New York City at the age of 16, initially to swim. He was captain of his high school swimming team and competed mostly in the 50 yd. and 100 yd. freestyle events. Additionally, he helped the team as a diver, and also swam and competed unattached in the NYC Boys’ Swimming Championships, winning gold in the 100 and silver in diving in 1949. He was awarded the “New York Maritime Benevolent Association Medal” in 1951 for saving a human life in peril. When he was 16 years old, he dove into an ice-filled river in New York to save a drowning five-year-old.

The YMCA introduced him to gymnastics and he was coached by John Van Aalten.

== Gymnastics career ==
=== College ===
Grossfeld finished 2nd in the individual all-around at the 1957 NCAA Championships (he attended the University of Illinois, class of 1960). He received a master's degree from the school in 1962. Grossfeld received the Dike Eddleman Athlete of the Year Award in 1959 as an Illinois Fighting Illini men's gymnastics team member.

At the NCAAs, he won four gold - AA, FX, two HB titles, and three silver and three bronze medals. He finished in the top three in 10 of 16 events, (1957–59). At the Big Ten Championships he won seven gold medals - 3 AA, FX, R, PB, & HB (1957–59). At the national AAU Championships he was four times the horizontal bar champion (1955–61).

=== World Championships ===
He competed in the 1958 World Championships, finishing 7th in the team competition and 53rd in the individual all-around.

Four years later, Grossfeld again competed in the World Championships, when the U.S. team placed 6th and Grossfeld finished 85th in the all-around.

=== Olympics career ===
==== Competing ====
A two-time Olympian for the United States' men's gymnastics team, Grossfeld first competed at the 1956 Melbourne Games. While the U.S. finished 6th overall in the team competition (271.5 points, only 5 points behind Czechoslovakia for the bronze medal), Grossfeld finished in 39th place in the individual all-around competition (107.75 points). During the Games, he also placed 13th in the horizontal bar, 23rd in the free-standing exercise, 34th in the rings, 48th in the parallel bars, and 52nd in the pommel horse.

Four years later, at the 1960 Summer Olympics, the U.S. team finished 5th and Grossfeld placed 36th in the all-around.

==== Coaching ====
After retiring from international competition, he coached the American gymnasts at the 1964, 1972, 1984, and 1988 Olympics. His 1984 team, with Mitch Gaylord, won the combined exercises championship.

=== Pan American Games ===
He had more success at the Pan American Games, competing in 1955, 1959, and 1963. He won 15 medals (eight golds; including three for Horizontal Bar championships), including the gold in the individual all-around in 1959.

=== Maccabiah Games ===
Grossfeld also dominated at the Maccabiah Games. He competed at the 1953 Maccabiah Games, the 1957 Maccabiah Games (winning 7 golds in 7 events; AA, R, PH, FX, HB, PB, & V), and the 1965 Maccabiah Games (winning four gold medals, four silver medals, and three bronze medals), winning a combined 17 gold medals.

== Coaching career ==
After retiring from competition, Grossfeld turned to coaching. He served as head coach of U.S. men's gymnastics team at five World Championships (1966, 1981, 1983, 1985, and 1987), and head coach of the U.S. team at Pan American Games in 1983 and 1987.

He was also the head coach of the men's team at the 1986 Goodwill Games.

In addition, he coached the U.S. gymnasts in three Maccabiah Games: 1973, 1977 (men and women), and 1981. His 1981 squad won three team gold medals.

During this time, he also became a professor of physical education and head gymnastics coach at Southern Connecticut State University, helping the program become one of the best in the country.

He coached four Nissen Award winners (akin to football's Heisman Trophy), three NCAA Div. II championship teams, 10 Consecutive Eastern Collegiate Conference (EIGL) team championships (1975-’84), and 148 gymnasts who achieved All-American status.

Among those he coached were Peter Kormann, the first U.S. Olympic individual gymnastics medalist since 1932; John Crosby, two World Cup individual gold medals; and three Pan American individual gold medal winners (1971 & ’75).

== Legacy ==
In 1959, Grossfeld was voted the University of Illinois’ “Athlete of the Year" and was awarded a Big Ten Medal of Honor for demonstrating joint athletic and academic excellence throughout his college career.

He received the Federation Internationale de Gymnastique Master of Sports Award in 1960.

He was chosen NCAA National Coach of the Year three times (1973, 1975, and 1976).

He was elected to the United States Gymnastics Hall of Fame in 1979.

He was named Gymnastics Federation Coach of the Year in 1984.

Grossfeld, who is Jewish, was inducted into the International Jewish Sports Hall of Fame in 1991.

He received the USA Gymnastics "Spirit of the Flame Award" in 1999.

Grossfeld received the World Acrobatic Society's Acrobatic Legend Award in 2001.

He was elected into National Judges Frank Cumiskey Hall of Fame.

== See also ==
- List of select Jewish gymnasts
