= Jorge Rodríguez (gymnast) =

Cuban gymnast (born 1948)

- Full name: Jorge Rodríguez Mone
- Born: 18 April 1948 (age 78) Havana, Cuba

Gymnastics career
- Discipline: Men's artistic gymnastics
- Country represented: Cuba

Jorge Rodríguez Mone (born 18 April 1948) is a Cuban gymnast. He competed at the 1968 Summer Olympics and the 1972 Summer Olympics.
