= Erick López =

Cuban artistic gymnast (born 1972)

- Full name: Erick López Ríos
- Born: 29 December 1972 (age 53) Havana, Cuba

Gymnastics career
- Discipline: Men's artistic gymnastics
- Country represented: Cuba (1991–2004)
Medal record
Men's artistic gymnastics
Representing Cuba
Event	1st	2nd	3rd
World Championships	0	1	0
Pan American Games	18	3	1
Pan American Championships	8	4	0
Total	26	8	1
World Championships
Silver medal – second place	2001 Ghent	Parallel bars
Pan American Games
Gold medal – first place	1991 Havana	Team
Gold medal – first place	1991 Havana	All-around
Gold medal – first place	1991 Havana	Vault
Gold medal – first place	1991 Havana	Parallel bars
Gold medal – first place	1995 Mar del Plata	All-around
Gold medal – first place	1995 Mar del Plata	Pommel horse
Gold medal – first place	1995 Mar del Plata	Parallel bars
Gold medal – first place	1999 Winnipeg	Team
Gold medal – first place	1999 Winnipeg	All-around
Gold medal – first place	1999 Winnipeg	Pommel horse
Gold medal – first place	1999 Winnipeg	Rings
Gold medal – first place	1999 Winnipeg	Parallel bars
Gold medal – first place	2003 Santo Domingo	Team
Gold medal – first place	2003 Santo Domingo	All-around
Gold medal – first place	2003 Santo Domingo	Pommel horse
Gold medal – first place	2003 Santo Domingo	Rings
Gold medal – first place	2003 Santo Domingo	Vault
Gold medal – first place	2003 Santo Domingo	Parallel bars
Silver medal – second place	1991 Havana	Rings
Silver medal – second place	1995 Mar del Plata	Team
Silver medal – second place	1999 Winnipeg	Horizontal bar
Bronze medal – third place	1995 Mar del Plata	Rings
Pacific Rim Championships
Gold medal – first place	1997 Medellín	Team
Gold medal – first place	1997 Medellín	All-around
Gold medal – first place	1997 Medellín	Pommel horse
Gold medal – first place	1997 Medellín	Parallel bars
Gold medal – first place	2001 Cancún	Team
Gold medal – first place	2001 Cancún	All-around
Gold medal – first place	2001 Cancún	Rings
Gold medal – first place	2001 Cancún	Parallel bars
Silver medal – second place	1997 Medellín	Rings
Silver medal – second place	2001 Cancún	Floor exercise
Silver medal – second place	2001 Cancún	Pommel horse
Silver medal – second place	2001 Cancún	Vault

Erick López Ríos (born 29 December 1972) is a Cuban male artistic gymnast, representing his nation at international competitions. He participated at the 2000 Summer Olympics and 2004 Summer Olympics as well as the Pan American Games. He also competed at world championship level.
