= Jorge Cuervo =

Cuban gymnast (born 1950)

- Full name: Jorge Cuervo Rivero
- Born: 4 May 1950 (age 76)

Gymnastics career
- Discipline: Men's artistic gymnastics
- Country represented: Cuba

Jorge Cuervo Rivero (born 4 May 1950) is a Cuban gymnast. He competed in eight events at the 1972 Summer Olympics.

His namesake Cuervo vault, first performed in 1973, consists of a handspring off the springboard, a half-twist, and a backward salto off the horse.
