= Scott Johnson (gymnast) =

American artistic gymnast

- Full name: Scott Philip Johnson
- Born: July 12, 1961 (age 65) Cincinnati, Ohio, U.S.
- Height: 160 cm (5 ft 3 in)

Gymnastics career
- Discipline: Men's artistic gymnastics
- Country represented: United States; (1981–1988)
- College team: Nebraska Cornhuskers
- Retired: 1988
Medal record
Men's artistic gymnastics
Representing United States
Olympic Games
Gold medal – first place	1984 Los Angeles	Team
Pan American Games
Gold medal – first place	1987 Indianapolis	Team
Gold medal – first place	1987 Indianapolis	All-around
Gold medal – first place	1987 Indianapolis	Still rings
Gold medal – first place	1987 Indianapolis	Parallel bars
Silver medal – second place	1987 Indianapolis	Floor exercise
Silver medal – second place	1987 Indianapolis	Pommel horse
Silver medal – second place	1987 Indianapolis	Vault
Silver medal – second place	1987 Indianapolis	Horizontal bar

Scott Philip Johnson (born July 12, 1961) is an American former artistic gymnast. He won a gold medal at the 1984 Summer Olympics in the team competition and was the team captain at the 1988 Summer Olympics. He won six medals at the 1987 Pan American Games, including the individual all-around title. He also competed at the collegiate level for the University of Nebraska and won seven NCAA titles. He was nominated for the James E. Sullivan Award in 1988 and was inducted into the USA Gymnastics Hall of Fame in 1999.

== Gymnastics career ==
Johnson began gymnastics at the age of ten at the YMCA in Colorado Springs, Colorado. He became the Colorado state all-around champion during his senior year of high school and then joined Nebraska Cornhuskers men's gymnastics team. While there, he won seven NCAA titles, including four consecutive team titles, and was an eleven-time All-American.

Johnson first joined the United States men's national artistic gymnastics team in 1981. He competed with the teams that placed fifth at the 1981 World Championships and fourth at the 1983 World Championships. He then represented the United States at the 1984 Summer Olympics and helped the team win the gold medal.

Johnson advanced into the individual all-around final at the 1985 World Championships and finished 22nd. He made history at the 1987 Pan American Games by becoming the first gymnast to win a medal in each event. He won gold medals in the team, all-around, still rings, and parallel bars events, and silver medals in the pommel horse, vault, and horizontal bar events. He represented the United States at the 1988 Summer Olympics and was the team captain. He retired from competition after these Olympic Games.

== Post-gymnastics ==
After retiring from competition, Johnson moved to Florida and began his coaching career at local YMCAs. He then opened Scott Johnson's Tumble and Gymnastics Academy, which has locations in Winter Springs, Lake Mary, and Apopka.

Johnson was inducted into the USA Gymnastics Hall of Fame in 1999. He was then inducted into the University of Nebraska Athletics Hall of Fame in 2017.
