= Jack Beckner =

American gymnast

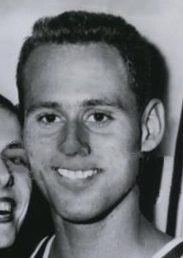
- Beckner in 1956

Personal information
- Full name: John Gilbert Beckner
- Born: June 9, 1930 Los Angeles, California, U.S.
- Died: November 16, 2016 (aged 86) Studio City, California, U.S.
- Height: 1.83 m (6 ft 0 in)
- Relatives: Dick Beckner (brother)

Gymnastics career
- Discipline: Men's artistic gymnastics
- Country represented: United States
- College team: USC Trojans; Los Angeles City College
- Club: Los Angeles Turners; Franklin High School
- Head coach: Charlie Graves
- Retired: c. 1964
Medal record
Men's artistic gymnastics
Representing United States
Event	1st	2nd	3rd
Pan American Games	9	1	1
Total	9	1	1
Pan American Games
Gold medal – first place	1955 Mexico City	Team
Gold medal – first place	1955 Mexico City	All-around
Gold medal – first place	1955 Mexico City	Floor
Gold medal – first place	1955 Mexico City	Pommel horse
Gold medal – first place	1955 Mexico City	Parallel bars
Gold medal – first place	1959 Chicago	Team
Gold medal – first place	1959 Chicago	All-around
Gold medal – first place	1959 Chicago	Vault
Gold medal – first place	1959 Chicago	Parallel bars
Silver medal – second place	1959 Chicago	Horizontal bar
Bronze medal – third place	1959 Chicago	Pommel horse

John Gilbert Beckner (June 9, 1930 – November 16, 2016) was an American artistic gymnast, coach, and referee. He was a member of the United States men's national artistic gymnastics team and competed at the 1952, 1956 and 1960 Summer Olympics with the best individual result of seventh place on the vault and horizontal bar in 1956. His elder brother Dick was also part of the 1956 Olympic gymnastics team.

== Early life and education ==
Beckner was born to Lola and Andrew Vernon Beckner. He studied at Los Angeles Valley College and the University of Southern California, graduating in 1953.

== Gymnastics and career ==
While attending USC, Beckner competed for the USC Trojans men's gymnastics team. He was the NCAA Champion in Parallel Bars in 1951 and 1952 and won the 1952 individual All-Around title. After college, Beckner was a member of the Los Angeles Turners Club.

Beckner won the individual AAU all-around title in 1956–59. At the 1955 and 1959 Pan American Games he collected 8 gold medals, which remains one of the best achievements of any American athlete.

In 1962 he earned a master's degree at the University of Southern California and coached there from 1969 to 1981. Previously he was a PE teacher and gymnastics coach and mentor at Van Nuys Jr High School from 1960 to 1967, then spent a year at Eagle Rock High School before becoming the gymnastics coach at USC. He also acted as the head coach for the 1968 USA gymnastics team for the 1968 Summer Olympics and served as a national and international judge.

== Personal life and legacy ==
He was inducted into the U.S. Gymnastics Hall of Fame (1976), National Gymnastics Judges Association Hall of Fame (1989), USC Hall of Fame (2005), and Los Angeles High Schools Sports Hall of Fame (2011). Beckner was married to Barbara Blaine, they had three children. He died in his sleep aged 86.
