= Juan Caviglia (gymnast) =

Argentine gymnast (1929–2022)

- Full name: Juan Nicolás Caviglia
- Born: 28 November 1929 Córdoba, Argentina
- Died: 17 January 2022 (aged 92) Alta Gracia, Argentina

Gymnastics career
- Discipline: Men's artistic gymnastics
- Country represented: Argentina

Juan Nicolás Caviglia (28 November 1929 – 17 January 2022) was an Argentine gymnast. He competed at the 1952 Summer Olympics and the 1960 Summer Olympics. Caviglia died on 17 January 2022, at the age of 92.

Later in life, Caviglia was named as the municipality's director of sports after forming gymnastics, athletics, volleyball, swimming, and handball teams in Alta Gracia, as well as constructing the city’s first heated swimming pool.
