= Wilhelm Weiler =

Canadian gymnast

- Full name: Wilhelm Friedrich Weiler
- Nickname: Willie
- Born: 1 March 1936 (age 90) Rastatt, Germany
- Height: 172 cm (5 ft 8 in)

Gymnastics career
- Discipline: Men's artistic gymnastics
- Country represented: Canada
- Eponymous skills: Weiler Kip: Clear hip circle fwd to handstand
Medal record
Men's artistic gymnastics
Representing Canada
Pan American Games
Gold medal – first place	1963 São Paulo	All-around
Gold medal – first place	1963 São Paulo	Floor exercise
Gold medal – first place	1963 São Paulo	Vault
Silver medal – second place	1963 São Paulo	Team
Silver medal – second place	1963 São Paulo	Pommel horse
Silver medal – second place	1963 São Paulo	Parallel bars
Silver medal – second place	1963 São Paulo	Horizontal bar
Bronze medal – third place	1963 São Paulo	Rings

Wilhelm Friedrich Weiler (born 1 March 1936) is a Canadian gymnast. He competed at the 1964 Summer Olympics. He won eight medals at the 1963 Pan American Games.
