= John Crosby Jr. =

American gymnast (1951–2017)

- Full name: John George Crosby, Jr.
- Born: June 29, 1951 New York City, New York, U.S.
- Died: October 17, 2017 (aged 66)
- Height: 172 cm (5 ft 8 in)

Gymnastics career
- Discipline: Men's artistic gymnastics
- Country represented: United States
- College team: Southern Connecticut State Owls
- Gym: New York Athletic Club
Medal record
Men's artistic gymnastics
Representing United States
Event	1st	2nd	3rd
Pan American Games	2	5	1
Total	2	5	1
Pan American Games
Gold medal – first place	1971 Cali	Floor
Gold medal – first place	1971 Cali	Rings
Silver medal – second place	1971 Cali	Team
Silver medal – second place	1971 Cali	All-around
Silver medal – second place	1971 Cali	Pommel horse
Silver medal – second place	1971 Cali	Parallel bars
Silver medal – second place	1971 Cali	Horizontal bar
Bronze medal – third place	1971 Cali	Vault

John George Crosby, Jr. (June 29, 1951 – October 17, 2017) was an American gymnast. He was a member of the United States men's national artistic gymnastics team and competed in eight events at the 1972 Summer Olympics.

Crosby was part of the US team for the 1973 Summer Universiade but was hospitalized with appendicitis while in the Soviet Union.

Crosby competed collegiately on the Southern Connecticut Owls men's gymnastics team under Abie Grossfeld and Crosby's 13 individual titles were the most in the history of the National Collegiate Athletic Association.
