= Gymnastics at the Pan American Games – Women's team all-around =

Women's events at the Gymnastics at the Pan American Games were first held at the 1959 Pan American Games.

Three medals are awarded: gold for first place, silver for second place, and bronze for third place. Tie breakers have not been used in every year. In the event of a tie between two gymnasts, both names are listed, and the following position (second for a tie for first, third for a tie for second) is left empty because a medal was not awarded for that position. If three gymnastics tied for a position, the following two positions are left empty.

== Medalists ==
Games	Location	Gold	Silver	Bronze
1959	(United States) Chicago	United States; Betty Maycock; Cassie Collawn; Teri Montefusco; Sharon Phelps; Judy Klauser; Sharon Richardson	Canada; Ernestine Russell; Marie-Claire Larsen; Louise Parker; Leissa Kroll; Rosemary Ripley; Margaret Schran	—N/a
1963	(Brazil) São Paulo	United States; Doris Fuchs; Dale McClements; Kathleen Corrigan; Avis Tieber; Marie Walther; Muriel Grossfeld	Canada; Gail Daley; Dorothy Haworth; Susan McDonnel; Maureen McDonald; Leissa Kroll	Cuba; Yolanda Williams; Julia Uria; Nancy Aldama; Yolanda Vega; Lilia Wong; Teresa Oliva
1967	(Canada) Winnipeg	United States; Linda Metheny; Joyce Tanac; Kathy Gleason; Marie Walther; Donna Schaenzer; Deborah Bailey	Canada; Susan McDonnell; Sandra Hartley; Marilynn Minaker; Glenna Sebestyen; Suzanne Cloutier; Dianne Masse	Cuba; Zulema Bregado; Nancy Aldama; Manuela Ponce; Yolanda Vega; Yolanda Williams; Julia Uria
1971	(Colombia) Cali	United States; Kim Chace; Theresa Fileccia; Adele Gleaves; Linda Metheny; Roxanne Pierce; Terry Spencer	Cuba; Vivian Garcia; Miriam Villacián; Nancy Aldama; Suzette Blanco; Vicenta Cruzata; Zulema Bregado	Canada; Lise Arsenault; Jennifer Diachun; Nancy McDonnell; Teresa McDonnell; Lise Cullete; Micheline Turcotte
1975	Mexico City	United States; Ann Carr; Kolleen Casey; Diane Dunbar; Kathy Howard; Roxanne Pierce; Debra Willcox	Cuba; Alicia Sanchez; Ivonne Fonseca; Orisel Martinez; Vicenta Cruzata; Mayra Hernandez; Estrella Valdés	Mexico; Herlinda Sanchez; Patricia García; Teresa Díaz; Eunice Aguillar; Carmen Gómez; Deby Grimberg
1979	(Puerto Rico) San Juan	Canada; Monica Goermann; Elfi Schlegel; Sherry Hawko; Diana Carnegie; Ellen Stewart; Carmen Alie; Shannon Fleming	Cuba; Tania González; Orisel Martínez; Elsa Chivás; Vicenta Cruzata; Zulma Rodriguez; Anet Rubido; Ileana Pérez	Mexico; Esther Thomas; Gabriela Apellániz; Michelle Popoff; Olga Brito; Estela de la Torre; Patricia García; Yeini Gutiérrez
1983	(Venezuela) Caracas	United States; Tracy Bulter; Yumi Mordre; Cindy Rosenberry; Trina Tinti; Lucy Wener; Lisa Wittwer	Cuba; Anet Rubido; Luisa Prieto; Orisel Martinez; Isabel Cruzata; Elsa Chivas; Tania Gonzalez	Brazil; Tatiana Figueiredo; Jacqueline Pires; Cláudia Costa; Miriam Fernandes; Altair Prado; Denilse Campos
1987	(United States) Indianapolis	United States; Rhonda Faehn; Kelly Garrison-Steves; Sabrina Mar; Missy Marlowe; Kristie Phillips; Hope Spivey	Cuba; Laura Rodríguez; Luisa Prieto; Tania Guia; Elsa Chivas; Ibis Naredo; Lufea Prieto	Canada; Andrea Conway; Yanic Giguère; Ildiko Hattayer; Theresa Mackenzie; Amélie Major; Daphné Vallières
1991	(Cuba) Havana	United States; Hillary Anderson; Juliet Bangerter; Kristin McDermott; Chelle Stack; Stephanie Woods; Anne Woynerowski	Cuba; Odaimis Jiménez; Leyanet González; Georgina Benítez; Indira Hernandez; Dayami Nuñez; Lisandra Cardoso	Canada; Mylene Fleury; Colleen Johnson; Stephanie Pierce; Tara Sherwood; Jenniffer Wood; Stacey Galloway
1995	(Argentina) Mar del Plata	United States; Mary Beth Arnold; Amanda Borden; Amy Chow; Shannon Miller; Kristy Powell; Katie Teft; Doni Thompson	Cuba; Annia Portuondo; Leyanet González; Lisandra Cardoso; Lidia Hidalgo; Mayludis Bombino; Arazay Jova; Yureisy Bermúdez	Argentina; Aldana Simone; Ana Destefano; Romina Plataroti; Romina Mazzoni; Laura Alvarez; Nancy Diorio; Ariadna Argoitía
1999	(Canada) Winnipeg	Canada; Yvonne Tousek; Lise Leveille; Michelle Conway; Kate Richardson; Emilie Fournier; Julie Beaulieu	United States; Jeanette Antolin; Alyssa Beckerman; Jamie Dantzscher; Erinn Dooley; Jennie Thompson; Morgan White	Brazil; Patricia Aoki; Daniele Hypólito; Heine Araújo; Marilia Gomes; Daiane dos Santos; Camila Comin
2003	(Dominican Republic) Santo Domingo	United States; Nastia Liukin; Courtney McCool; Tia Orlando; Chellsie Memmel; Marcia Newby; Allyse Ishino	Canada; Melanie Banville; Lydia Williams; Heather Purnell; Richelle Simpson; Gael Mackie; Kylie Stone	Brazil; Ana Paula Rodrigues; Camila Comin; Caroline Molinari; Daiane dos Santos; Daniele Hypólito; Laís Souza
2007	(Brazil) Rio de Janeiro	United States; Rebecca Bross; Ivana Hong; Shawn Johnson; Nastia Liukin; Samantha Peszek; Amber Trani	Brazil; Jade Barbosa; Khiuani Dias; Daniele Hypólito; Ana Silva; Laís Souza; Daiane dos Santos	Canada; Stéphanie Desjardins-Labelle; Peng Peng Lee; Ti Liu; Charlotte Mackie; Brittany Rogers; Emma Willis
2011	(Mexico) Guadalajara	United States; Bridgette Caquatto; Jessie DeZiel; Brandie Jay; Shawn Johnson; Grace McLaughlin; Bridget Sloan	Canada; Kristina Vaculik; Peng Peng Lee; Coralie Leblond-Chartrand; Mikaela Gerber; Dominique Pegg; Talia Chiarelli	Mexico; Elsa García; Marisela Cantú; Ana Lago; Karla Salazar; Yessenia Estrada; Alexa Moreno
2015	(Canada) Toronto	United States; Madison Desch; Rachel Gowey; Amelia Hundley; Emily Schild; Megan Skaggs	Canada; Ellie Black; Maegan Chant; Madison Copiak; Isabela Onyshko; Victoria Woo	Brazil; Lorrane Oliveira; Letícia Costa; Flávia Saraiva; Daniele Hypólito; Julie Sinmon
2019	(Peru) Lima	United States; Kara Eaker; Aleah Finnegan; Morgan Hurd; Riley McCusker; Leanne Wong	Canada; Ellie Black; Brooklyn Moors; Shallon Olsen; Isabela Onyshko; Victoria-Kayen Woo	Brazil; Jade Barbosa; Thaís Fidélis; Lorrane Oliveira; Carolyne Pedro; Flávia Saraiva
2023	(Chile) Santiago	United States; Jordan Chiles; Kayla DiCello; Kaliya Lincoln; Zoe Miller; Tiana Sumanasekera	Brazil; Rebeca Andrade; Jade Barbosa; Carolyne Pedro; Flávia Saraiva; Júlia Soares	Canada; Cassie Lee; Frédérique Sgarbossa; Ava Stewart; Aurélie Tran; Sydney Turner

== Medal table ==
Rank	Nation	Gold	Silver	Bronze	Total
1	United States (USA)	15	1	0	16
2	Canada (CAN)	2	7	5	14
3	Cuba (CUB)	0	7	2	9
4	Brazil (BRA)	0	2	5	7
5	Mexico (MEX)	0	0	3	3
6	Argentina (ARG)	0	0	1	1
Totals (6 entries)		17	17	16	50
