= United States women's national artistic gymnastics team =

American gymnastics team

United States
- Founded: 1982
- Continental union: PAGU
- National federation: USA Gymnastics
- Head coach: Chellsie Memmel; Betty Okino; Alicia Sacramone-Quinn
- Training location: The Gymnastics Company
- Uniform supplier: GK Elite

Olympic Games
- Appearances: 19
- Medals: Gold: 1996, 2012, 2016, 2024; Silver: 1984, 2004, 2008, 2020; Bronze: 1948, 1992, 2000

World Championships
- Appearances: 29
- Medals: Gold: 2003, 2007, 2011, 2014, 2015, 2018, 2019, 2022, 2023; Silver: 1991, 1994, 2006, 2010, 2026; Bronze: 1995, 2001

Pan American Games
- Medals: Gold: 1959, 1963, 1967, 1971, 1975, 1983, 1987, 1991, 1995, 2003, 2007, 2011, 2015, 2019, 2023; Silver: 1999

Pan American Championships
- Medals: Gold: 2001, 2005, 2010, 2014, 2018, 2023, 2025, 2026; Silver: 1997, 2022

Junior World Championships
- Appearances: 3
- Medals: Silver: 2023; Bronze: 2019, 2025

The United States women's national artistic gymnastics team represents the United States in FIG international competitions.

As of 2026, the U.S. team is the reigning Olympic team gold medalist, with the five gymnasts nicknamed the "Golden Girls."

== History ==
The U.S. women won the team competition bronze medal at the 1948 Summer Olympics. Afterwards, they did not win another Summer Olympics or World Championships medal until 1984 when the Olympic team won silver. During that competition, Mary Lou Retton also became the first American to win the individual all-around gold medal. The Americans started consistently winning Olympic and World team medals in the early 1990s with future Hall of Famers Shannon Miller and Dominique Dawes. The 1996 Olympic team, known as the Magnificent Seven, was the first American team to win Olympic gold. An iconic moment in the sport's history came late in the competition, when an injured Kerri Strug stuck a vault to secure the title. After 1996, the team regressed for several years as their stars took breaks from competing.

Márta Károlyi headed the program after the 2000 Olympics, ushering in an era of success for the U.S. team as they became one of the most dominant countries in women's gymnastics. The U.S. team has medalled in every Olympics and Worlds since 2000. They won their first team World gold medal in 2003. At the 2004 Olympics, they won the team silver, and Carly Patterson became the second American gymnast to win the individual all-around and the first to do so at a non-Boycotted Olympic Games. The U.S. team continued their success into the next quad. They won another Olympic silver medal in 2008. Nastia Liukin and Shawn Johnson were two of the best gymnasts of their era and finished first and second in the 2008 individual all-around.

They won gold at the 2011 World Championships and then won gold at the 2012 Olympics by over five points. The 2012 team was nicknamed the Fierce Five and included Gabby Douglas, the first African American woman to win the Olympic individual all-around. In 2013, Simone Biles started her senior career and helped the U.S. team dominate the sport through 2016. In addition to the team gold medals, Biles won the individual all-around at the World Championships and Olympic Games for four straight years. The 2016 Olympic team, featuring Biles and veterans Douglas and Aly Raisman, was named the Final Five. They won the team competition by more than eight points.

=== Olympic Games ===
The USA Gymnastics women have won the Olympic Gold four times, in 1996, 2012, 2016, and 2024. These successes led to the nicknames Magnificent Seven, Fierce Five, Final Five, and Golden Girls, respectively. They won four silvers in 1984, 2004, 2008, and 2020 and three bronzes in 1948, 1992 and 2000. The 2016 team name alluded to Márta Károlyi's final team to coach and that the team structure will be changed to four members beginning with the 2020 Olympic Games. The 1988 Olympic Games was the only year in which the team did not medal since its formation in 1982; they missed the bronze medal by one controversial deduction. Six American women have won the Olympic individual all-around title, including six consecutive titles from 2004–24: Mary Lou Retton (1984), Carly Patterson (2004), Nastia Liukin (2008), Gabby Douglas (2012), Simone Biles (2016 and 2024), and Sunisa Lee (2020). The most decorated American gymnast at the Olympics, with eleven medals, is Simone Biles (7 gold, 2 silvers, 2 bronze).

=== World Championships ===
The United States women team is currently third in the all-time medal count for the World Artistic Gymnastics Championships. The first American gymnast to win a medal at the World Championships was Cathy Rigby who won silver on beam in 1970. The first female American gymnast to win a world title was Marcia Frederick in 1978 on the uneven bars. The most decorated American gymnast at the World Championships is Simone Biles, who won 25 medals (19 gold, 3 silver and 3 bronze) from 2013 to 2019. The United States won team gold in 2003, 2007, 2011, 2014, 2015, 2018, 2019, 2022, and 2023 . Additionally, nine American women have won the individual World all-around title: Kim Zmeskal (1991), Shannon Miller (1993–1994), Chellsie Memmel (2005), Shawn Johnson (2007), Bridget Sloan (2009), Jordyn Wieber (2011), Simone Biles (2013–2015, 2018–2019, 2023), Morgan Hurd (2017), and Skye Blakely (2026). Biles is the only American gymnast to win both the Olympic and World all-around titles.

== Current roster ==
As of August 9, 2026:

=== Senior team ===
Name	Birth date and age	Current residence	Club	Head coach(es)	College team
Skye Blakely	February 4, 2005 (age 21)	Frisco, Texas	University of Florida	Jenny Rowland; Owen Field	Florida Gators (2025–2028)
Charleigh Bullock	July 2, 2010 (age 16)	Spotsylvania, Virginia	Capital Gymnastics	Tatiana Perskaia	
Jade Carey	May 27, 2000 (age 26)	Corvallis, Oregon	Oregon State University	Brian Carey	Oregon State Beavers (2022–2025)
Dulcy Caylor	December 9, 2007 (age 18)	Spring, Texas	World Champions Centre	Daymon Jones; Patrick Kiens	Florida Gators (2027–2030)
Tatum Drusch	November 25, 2008 (age 17)	White Bear Lake, Minnesota	Flips Gymnastics	Bart Rokowski	Louisiana State Tigers (2028-2031)
Reese Esponda	October 28, 2008 (age 18)	Shenandoah, Texas	World Champions Centre	Daymon Jones; Patrick Kiens	Louisiana State Tigers (2028–2031)
Zoey Molomo	July 11, 2008 (age 18)	McKinney, Texas	Metroplex Gymnastics	Marnie Futch	UCLA Bruins (2027–2030)
Caroline Moreau	February 17, 2010 (age 16)	Keller, Texas	Texas Dreams	Kim Zmeskal	
Claire Pease	January 5, 2009 (age 17)	Sunnyvale, Texas	WOGA	Valeri Liukin	Utah Utes (2028–2031)
Lila Richardson	January 12, 2010 (age 16)	Russellville, Arkansas	Metroplex Gymnastics	Marnie Futch	Alabama Crimson Tide (2029–2032)
Hezly Rivera	June 4, 2008 (age 18)	Plano, Texas	WOGA	Valeri Liukin	Louisiana State Tigers (2027–2030)
Simone Rose	July 9, 2008 (age 18)	Sammamish, Washington	Pacific Reign	Cale Robinson	Florida Gators (2027–2030)
Izzy Stassi	September 21, 2008 (age 18)	Lewis Center, Ohio	University of Oklahoma	K.J. Kindler	Oklahoma Sooners (2027–2030)

=== Junior team ===
Name	Birth date and age	Current residence	Club	Head coach(es)
Vivi Crain	June 8, 2012 (age 14)	Spring, Texas	World Champions Centre	Daymon Jones; Patrick Kiens
Eva Doherty	May 27, 2011 (age 15)	Virginia Beach, Virginia	World Class Gymnastics	
Sadie Drake	May 27, 2011 (age 15)	Sammamish, Washington	Advantage Gymnastics Academy	
Madelyn Eagle	April 28, 2011 (age 15)	Mansfield, Texas	WOGA	
Avery Haines	March 30, 2013 (age 13)	Bowie, Maryland	First State Gymnastics	
Brooklyn Klauser	August 16, 2013 (age 13)	Prosper, Texas	WOGA	
Anslee McCauley	July 26, 2011 (age 15)	Marietta, Georgia	Georgia All-Star Gymnastics	
Amia Pugh-Banks	October 19, 2011 (age 15)	Newport News, Virginia	World Class Gymnastics	Tami Harrison
Paisley Ritger	October 12, 2012 (age 14)	Dayton, Minnesota	Twin City Twisters	Seth Helland
Kylie Smith	June 18, 2011 (age 15)	Loveland, Ohio	Cincinnati Gymnastics	Rachael Gardner
Cassandra Tan	July 18, 2011 (age 15)	Poulsbo, Washington	Pacific Reign	Cale Robinson
Addalye VanGrinsven	August 6, 2011 (age 15)	Bothell, Washington	Pacific Reign	Cale Robinson
Audrey VanGrinsven	April 6, 2014 (age 12)	Bothell, Washington	Pacific Reign	Cale Robinson
Sydney Williams	April 20, 2012 (age 14)	Frisco, Texas	Metroplex Gymnastics	

== Staff ==
- Betty Okino – Developmental Lead
- Chellsie Memmel – Technical Lead
- Alicia Sacramone-Quinn – Strategic Lead
- Annie Heffernon – Senior Vice President
- Krissy Klein – Women's Program Manager
- Kim Riley – Managing Director of Athlete and Coaching Programs

== Team competition results ==
=== Olympic Games ===
Year	Position	Squad
1936	5th place	Jennie Caputo, Consetta Caruccio-Lenz, Margaret Duff, Irma Haubold, Marie Kibler, Ada Lunardoni, Adelaide Meyer, Mary Wright
1948	Bronze medal	Ladislava Bakanic, Marian Barone, Consetta Caruccio-Lenz, Dorothy Dalton, Meta Elste-Neumann, Helen Schifano, Clara Schroth, Anita Simonis
1952	15th place	Marian Barone, Dorothy Dalton, Meta Elste-Neumann, Ruth Grulkowski, Marie Hoesly, Doris Kirkman, Clara Schroth, Ruth Topalian
1956	9th place	Muriel Davis, Doris Fuchs, Judy Howe, Jackie Klein, Joyce Racek, Sandra Ruddick
1960	9th place	Muriel Davis, Doris Fuchs, Betty-Jean Maycock, Teresa Montefusco, Sharon Richardson, Gail Sontgerath
1964	9th place	Kathleen Corrigan, Muriel Davis, Dale McClements, Linda Metheny, Janie Speaks, Marie Walther
1968	6th place	Wendy Cluff, Kathy Gleason, Linda Metheny, Colleen Mulvihill, Cathy Rigby, Joyce Tanac
1972	4th place	Kimberly Chace, Linda Metheny, Joan Moore, Roxanne Pierce, Cathy Rigby, Nancy Thies
1976	6th place	Kolleen Casey, Kimberly Chace, Carrie Englert, Kathy Howard, Debra Willcox, Leslie Wolfsberger
1980	boycott	Luci Collins, Marcia Frederick, Kathy Johnson, Beth Kline, Amy Koopman, Julianne McNamara, Tracee Talavera (Note: A team was named for the 1980 Olympic Games; however they did not compete as the USA boycotted and did not send any athletes)
1984	Silver medal	Pam Bileck, Michelle Dusserre, Kathy Johnson, Julianne McNamara, Mary Lou Retton, Tracee Talavera
1988	4th place	Brandy Johnson, Kelly Garrison, Melissa Marlowe, Phoebe Mills, Hope Spivey, Chelle Stack
1992	Bronze medal	Wendy Bruce, Dominique Dawes, Shannon Miller, Betty Okino, Kerri Strug, Kim Zmeskal
1996	Gold medal	Amanda Borden, Amy Chow, Dominique Dawes, Shannon Miller, Dominique Moceanu, Jaycie Phelps, Kerri Strug
2000	Bronze medal	Amy Chow, Jamie Dantzscher, Dominique Dawes, Kristen Maloney, Elise Ray, Tasha Schwikert
2004	Silver medal	Mohini Bhardwaj, Annia Hatch, Terin Humphrey, Courtney Kupets, Courtney McCool, Carly Patterson
2008	Silver medal	Shawn Johnson, Nastia Liukin, Chellsie Memmel, Samantha Peszek, Alicia Sacramone, Bridget Sloan
2012	Gold medal	Gabby Douglas, McKayla Maroney, Aly Raisman, Kyla Ross, Jordyn Wieber
2016	Gold medal	Simone Biles, Gabby Douglas, Laurie Hernandez, Madison Kocian, Aly Raisman
2020	Silver medal	Simone Biles, Jordan Chiles, Sunisa Lee, Grace McCallum
2024	Gold medal	Simone Biles, Jade Carey, Jordan Chiles, Sunisa Lee, Hezly Rivera
Total	4 Titles	

=== World Championships ===
Names in italics are alternates who received a team medal.

Year	Position	Squad
1962	8th place	Muriel Davis, Doris Fuchs, Betty-Jean Maycock, Gail Sontgerath, Avis Tieber, Marie Walther
1966	6th place	Debbie Bailey, Doris Fuchs, Dale McClements, Kathy Gleason, Carolyn Hacker, Joyce Tanac
1970	7th place	Cleo Carver, Kimberly Chace, Wendy Cluff, Adele Gleaves, Joan Moore, Cathy Rigby
1974	6th place	Janette Anderson, Ann Carr, Diane Dunbar, Debbie Fike, Kathy Howard, Joan Moore
1978	5th place	Christa Canary, Marcia Frederick, Kathy Johnson, Leslie Pyfer, Rhonda Schwandt, Donna Turnbow
1979	6th place	Christa Canary, Marcia Frederick, Kathy Johnson, Suzy Kellems, Leslie Pyfer, Leslie Russo
1981	6th place	Michelle Goodwin, Kathy Johnson, Amy Koopman, Julianne McNamara, Gina Stallone, Tracee Talavera
1983	7th place	Pam Bileck, Kelly Garrison, Kathy Johnson, Julianne McNamara, Yumi Mordre, Tanya Service
1985	6th place	Pam Bileck, Tracey Calore, Kelly Garrison, Sabrina Mar, Marie Roethlisberger, Jennifer Sey
1987	6th place	Rhonda Faehn, Kelly Garrison, Sabrina Mar, Melissa Marlowe, Phoebe Mills, Kristie Phillips
1989	4th place	Wendy Bruce, Christy Henrich, Brandy Johnson, Kim Kelly, Chelle Stack, Sandy Woolsey
1991	Silver medal	Michelle Campi, Hilary Grivich, Shannon Miller, Betty Okino, Kerri Strug, Kim Zmeskal
1994	Silver medal	Amanda Borden, Amy Chow, Dominique Dawes, Larissa Fontaine, Shannon Miller, Jaycie Phelps, Kerri Strug
1995	Bronze medal	Mary Beth Arnold, Theresa Kulikowski, Shannon Miller, Dominique Moceanu, Jaycie Phelps, Kerri Strug, Doni Thompson
1997	6th place	Kendall Beck, Mohini Bhardwaj, Kristen Maloney, Dominique Moceanu, Kristy Powell, Jennie Thompson
1999	5th place	Jeanette Antolin, Vanessa Atler, Jamie Dantzscher, Kristen Maloney, Elise Ray, Morgan White
2001	Bronze medal	Mohini Bhardwaj, Katie Heenan, Ashley Miles, Tasha Schwikert, Rachel Tidd, Tabitha Yim
2003	Gold medal	Terin Humphrey, Courtney Kupets, Chellsie Memmel, Carly Patterson, Tasha Schwikert, Hollie Vise
2006	Silver medal	Jana Bieger, Natasha Kelley, Nastia Liukin, Chellsie Memmel, Ashley Priess, Alicia Sacramone
2007	Gold medal	Ivana Hong, Shawn Johnson, Nastia Liukin, Samantha Peszek, Alicia Sacramone, Shayla Worley
2010	Silver medal	Rebecca Bross, Mackenzie Caquatto, Mattie Larson, Aly Raisman, Alicia Sacramone, Bridget Sloan
2011	Gold medal	Gabby Douglas, McKayla Maroney, Aly Raisman, Alicia Sacramone, Sabrina Vega, Jordyn Wieber
2014	Gold medal	Alyssa Baumann, Simone Biles, Madison Desch, Madison Kocian, Ashton Locklear, Kyla Ross, MyKayla Skinner
2015	Gold medal	Simone Biles, Gabby Douglas, Brenna Dowell, Madison Kocian, Maggie Nichols, Aly Raisman, MyKayla Skinner
2018	Gold medal	Simone Biles, Kara Eaker, Morgan Hurd, Grace McCallum, Riley McCusker, Ragan Smith
2019	Gold medal	Simone Biles, Jade Carey, Kara Eaker, Sunisa Lee, Grace McCallum, MyKayla Skinner
2022	Gold medal	Skye Blakely, Jade Carey, Jordan Chiles, Shilese Jones, Leanne Wong, Lexi Zeiss
2023	Gold medal	Simone Biles, Skye Blakely, Shilese Jones, Joscelyn Roberson, Leanne Wong, Kayla DiCello
2026	Silver medal	Skye Blakely, Charleigh Bullock, Dulcy Caylor, Reese Esponda, Claire Pease, Hezly Rivera
Total	9 Titles	

=== Pan American Games ===
Year	Position	Squad
1959	Gold medal	Betty Maycock, Cassie Collawn, Theresa Montefusco, Sharon Phelps, Judy Klauser, Sharon Richardson
1963	Gold medal	Doris Fuchs, Dale McClements, Kathleen Corrigan, Avis Tieber, Marie Walther, Muriel Grossfeld
1967	Gold medal	Linda Metheny, Joyce Tanac, Kathy Gleason, Marie Walther, Donna Schaenzer, Deborah Bailey
1971	Gold medal	Kim Chace, Theresa Fileccia, Adele Gleaves, Linda Metheny, Roxanne Pierce, Terry Spencer
1975	Gold medal	Ann Carr, Kolleen Casey, Diane Dunbar, Kathy Howard, Roxanne Pierce, Debbie Wilcox
1983	Gold medal	Tracy Butler, Yumi Mordre, Cindy Rosenberry, Trina Tinti, Lucy Wener, Lisa Wittwer
1987	Gold medal	Rhonda Faehn, Kelly Garrison-Steves, Sabrina Mar, Melissa Marlowe, Kristie Phillips, Hope Spivey
1991	Gold medal	Hillary Anderson, Juliet Bangerter, Kristin McDermott, Chelle Stack, Stephanie Woods, Anne Woynerowski
1995	Gold medal	Mary Beth Arnold, Amanda Borden, Amy Chow, Shannon Miller, Kristy Powell, Katie Teft, Doni Thompson
1999	Silver medal	Jeanette Antolin, Alyssa Beckerman, Jamie Dantzscher, Erinn Dooley, Jennie Thompson, Morgan White
2003	Gold medal	Nastia Liukin, Courtney McCool, Tia Orlando, Chellsie Memmel, Marcia Newby, Allyse Ishino
2007	Gold medal	Rebecca Bross, Ivana Hong, Shawn Johnson, Nastia Liukin, Samantha Peszek, Amber Trani
2011	Gold medal	Bridgette Caquatto, Jessie DeZiel, Brandie Jay, Shawn Johnson, Grace McLaughlin, Bridget Sloan
2015	Gold medal	Madison Desch, Rachel Gowey, Amelia Hundley, Emily Schild, Megan Skaggs
2019	Gold medal	Kara Eaker, Aleah Finnegan, Morgan Hurd, Riley McCusker, Leanne Wong
2023	Gold medal	Jordan Chiles, Kayla DiCello, Kaliya Lincoln, Zoe Miller, Tiana Sumanasekera
Total	15 Titles	

=== Pan American Championships ===
Year	Position	Squad
1997	Silver medal	Erinn Dooley, Nicole Kilpatrick, Raegan Tomasek, Morgan White
2001	Gold medal	Tasha Schwikert, Mohini Bhardwaj, Tabitha Yim, Katie Heenan
2005	Gold medal	Chellsie Memmel, Alicia Sacramone, Jana Bieger, Bianca Flohr
2010	Gold medal	Gabby Douglas, Brenna Dowell, Kyla Ross, Sarah Finnegan, Sabrina Vega, McKayla Maroney
2014	Gold medal	MyKayla Skinner, Maggie Nichols, Madison Desch, Amelia Hundley, Madison Kocian, Ashton Locklear
2018	Gold medal	Jade Carey, Kara Eaker, Shilese Jones, Grace McCallum, Trinity Thomas
2021	—N/a	Did not participate
2022	Silver medal	Skye Blakely, Kayla DiCello, Addison Fatta, Zoe Miller, Elle Mueller, Lexi Zeiss
2023	Gold medal	Addison Fatta, Madray Johnson, Nola Matthews, Zoe Miller, Joscelyn Roberson, Tiana Sumanasekera
2024	—N/a	Did not participate
2025	Gold medal	Dulcy Caylor, Jayla Hang, Gabrielle Hardie, Hezly Rivera, Tiana Sumanasekera, Alessia Rosa
2026	Gold medal	Charleigh Bullock, Claire Pease, Alessia Rosa, Hezly Rivera, Simone Rose, Lila Richardson
Total	8 Titles	

=== Junior World Championships ===
Names in italics are alternates who received a team medal.

Year	Position	Squad
2019	Bronze medal	Sydney Barros, Skye Blakely, Kayla DiCello, Konnor McClain
2023	Silver medal	Jayla Hang, Hezly Rivera, Izzy Stassi, Kieryn Finnell
2025	Bronze medal	Charleigh Bullock, Lavi Crain, Caroline Moreau, Addy Fulcher
Total	0 Titles	

== Most decorated gymnasts ==
This list includes all American female artistic gymnasts who have won at least four medals at the Olympic Games and the World Artistic Gymnastics Championships combined.

Rank	Gymnast	Years	Team	AA	VT	UB	BB	FX	Olympic Total	World Total	Total
1	Simone Biles	2013–2024	2016; 2024; 2014; 2015; 2018; 2019; 2023; 2020	2016; 2024; 2013; 2014; 2015; 2018; 2019; 2023	2016; 2024; 2018; 2019; 2013; 2014; 2023; 2015	2018	2016; 2020; 2014; 2015; 2019; 2023; 2013; 2018	2016; 2024; 2013; 2014; 2015; 2018; 2019; 2023	11	30	41
2	Shannon Miller	1991–1996	1996; 1992; 1991; 1994; 1995	1992; 1993; 1994		1992; 1993; 1991	1996; 1992; 1994	1992; 1993	7	9	16
3	Nastia Liukin	2005–2008	2008; 2007; 2006	2008; 2005		2008; 2005; 2006; 2007	2008; 2005; 2007	2008; 2005	5	9	14
4	Alicia Sacramone	2005–2011	2008; 2007; 2011; 2006; 2010		2010; 2006; 2005; 2007			2005; 2007	1	10	11
5	Jade Carey	2017–2024	2024; 2019; 2022		2024; 2022; 2017; 2019			2020; 2017; 2022	3	7	10
5	Aly Raisman	2010–2016	2012; 2016; 2011; 2015; 2010	2016			2012	2012; 2016; 2011	6	4	10
7	Sunisa Lee	2019–2024	2024; 2020; 2019	2020; 2024		2020; 2024; 2019		2019	6	3	9
8	Dominique Dawes	1992–2000	1996; 1992; 2000; 1994			1993	1993; 1996	1996	4	4	8
9	Shawn Johnson	2007–2008	2008; 2007	2008; 2007			2008	2008; 2007	4	3	7
10	Chellsie Memmel	2003–2008	2008; 2003; 2006	2005		2003; 2005	2005		1	6	7
11	Gabby Douglas	2011–2016	2012; 2016; 2011; 2015	2012; 2015					3	3	6
12	Skye Blakely	2022–2026	2022; 2023; 2026	2026	2026	2026			0	6	6
12	Kim Zmeskal	1991–1992	1992; 1991	1991			1992	1992; 1991	1	5	6
14	Kyla Ross	2012–2014	2012; 2014	2013; 2014		2013	2013		1	5	6
15	Shilese Jones	2022–2023	2022; 2023	2022; 2023		2022; 2023			0	6	6
16	Rebecca Bross	2009–2010	2010	2009; 2010		2009; 2010	2010		0	6	6
17	Madison Kocian	2014–2016	2016; 2014; 2015			2016; 2015			2	3	5
17	McKayla Maroney	2011–2013	2012; 2011		2012; 2011; 2013				2	3	5
19	MyKayla Skinner	2014–2021	2014; 2015; 2019		2020; 2014				1	4	5
20	Jordan Chiles	2020–2024	2024; 2020; 2022		2022			2022	2	3	5
20	Carly Patterson	2003–2004	2004; 2003	2004; 2003			2004		3	2	5
22	Morgan Hurd	2017–2018	2018	2017; 2018			2017	2018	0	5	5
22	Leanne Wong	2021–2025	2022; 2023	2021; 2025				2021	0	5	5
24	Mary Lou Retton	1984	1984	1984	1984	1984		1984	5	0	5
24	Kerri Strug	1991–1996	1996; 1992; 1991; 1994; 1995						2	3	5
26	Jordyn Wieber	2011–2012	2012; 2011	2011			2011		1	3	4
27	Courtney Kupets	2002–2004	2004; 2003			2004; 2002			2	2	4
28	Amy Chow	1994–2000	1996; 2000; 1994			1996			3	1	4
28	Julianne McNamara	1981–1984	1984			1984; 1981	1984		3	1	4
30	Betty Okino	1991–1992	1992; 1991			1992	1991		1	3	4

== Best international results ==
Event	TF	AA	VT	UB	BB	FX
Olympic Games	1st place, gold medalist(s)	1st place, gold medalist(s)	1st place, gold medalist(s)	1st place, gold medalist(s)	1st place, gold medalist(s)	1st place, gold medalist(s)
World Championships	1st place, gold medalist(s)	1st place, gold medalist(s)	1st place, gold medalist(s)	1st place, gold medalist(s)	1st place, gold medalist(s)	1st place, gold medalist(s)
Pan American Games	1st place, gold medalist(s)	1st place, gold medalist(s)	1st place, gold medalist(s)	1st place, gold medalist(s)	1st place, gold medalist(s)	1st place, gold medalist(s)
Pan American Championships	1st place, gold medalist(s)	1st place, gold medalist(s)	1st place, gold medalist(s)	1st place, gold medalist(s)	1st place, gold medalist(s)	1st place, gold medalist(s)
Junior World Championships	2nd place, silver medalist(s)	4	1st place, gold medalist(s)	3rd place, bronze medalist(s)	3rd place, bronze medalist(s)	2nd place, silver medalist(s)
Junior Pan American Games	1st place, gold medalist(s)	1st place, gold medalist(s)	1st place, gold medalist(s)	1st place, gold medalist(s)	1st place, gold medalist(s)	1st place, gold medalist(s)
Junior Pan American Championships	1st place, gold medalist(s)	1st place, gold medalist(s)	1st place, gold medalist(s)	1st place, gold medalist(s)	1st place, gold medalist(s)	1st place, gold medalist(s)

== Hall of Famers ==
Nine national team gymnasts, one national team coach, and one official have been inducted into the International Gymnastics Hall of Fame:

- Béla Károlyi (coach) – 1997
- Mary Lou Retton – 1997
- Cathy Rigby – 1997
- Shannon Miller – 2006
- Dominique Dawes – 2009
- Kim Zmeskal – 2012
- Jackie Fie (FIG official) – 2014
- Alicia Sacramone – 2017
- Nastia Liukin – 2018
- Shawn Johnson – 2019
- Chellsie Memmel – 2022

== See also ==
- Artistic gymnastics in the United States
- United States men's national artistic gymnastics team
- List of former United States women's national gymnastics team rosters
- List of U.S. National Championships medalists in gymnastics
- List of Olympic female artistic gymnasts for the United States
- United States at the World Artistic Gymnastics Championships
