= Gymnastics at the Pan American Games – Women's individual all-around =

Women's events at the Gymnastics at the Pan American Games were first held at the 1959 Pan American Games.

Three medals are awarded: gold for first place, silver for second place, and bronze for third place. Tie breakers have not been used in every year. In the event of a tie between two gymnasts, both names are listed, and the following position (second for a tie for first, third for a tie for second) is left empty because a medal was not awarded for that position. If three gymnastics tied for a position, the following two positions are left empty.

== Medalists ==
Year	Location	Gold	Silver	Bronze
1959	(United States) Chicago	(Canada) Ernestine Russell	(United States) Betty Maycock	(Canada) Marie-Claire Larsen
1963	(Brazil) São Paulo	(United States) Doris Fuchs	(United States) Marie-Claire Larsen (United States) Avis Tieber	—
1967	(Canada) Winnipeg	(United States) Linda Metheny	(United States) Joyce Tanac	(United States) Marie Walther
1971	(Colombia) Cali	(United States) Roxanne Pierce	(United States) Linda Metheny	(United States) Kim Chace
1975	Mexico City	(United States) Ann Carr	(United States) Roxanne Pierce	(United States) Kolleen Casey
1979	(Puerto Rico) San Juan	(Canada) Monica Goermann	(United States) Jeanine Creek	(Canada) Elfi Schlegel
1983	(Venezuela) Caracas	(Cuba) Orisel Martinez	(United States) Yumi Mordre	(United States) Lisa Wittwer
1987	(United States) Indianapolis	(United States) Sabrina Mar	(United States) Kristie Phillips	(United States) Kelly Garrison
1991	(Cuba) Havana	(United States) Stephanie Woods	(United States) Chelle Stack	(Argentina) Romina Plataroti
1995	(Argentina) Mar del Plata	(United States) Shannon Miller	(United States) Amanda Borden	(United States) Amy Chow
1999	(Canada) Winnipeg	(United States) Morgan White	(Canada) Michelle Conway	(United States) Jennie Thompson
2003	(Dominican Republic) Santo Domingo	(United States) Chellsie Memmel	(United States) Nastia Liukin	(Brazil) Daniele Hypólito
2007	(Brazil) Rio de Janeiro	(United States) Shawn Johnson	(United States) Rebecca Bross	(United States) Ivana Hong
2011	(Mexico) Guadalajara	(United States) Bridgette Caquatto	(Guatemala) Ana Sofía Gómez	(Canada) Kristina Vaculik
2015	(Canada) Toronto	(Canada) Ellie Black	(United States) Madison Desch	(Brazil) Flávia Saraiva
2019	(Peru) Lima	(Canada) Ellie Black	(United States) Riley McCusker	(Brazil) Flávia Saraiva
2023	(Chile) Santiago	(United States) Kayla DiCello	(Brazil) Flávia Saraiva	(United States) Jordan Chiles

== Medal table ==
Rank	Nation	Gold	Silver	Bronze	Total
1	United States (USA)	11	15	8	34
2	Canada (CAN)	4	1	3	8
3	Cuba (CUB)	1	0	0	1
4	Brazil (BRA)	0	1	3	4
5	Guatemala (GUA)	0	1	0	1
6	Argentina (ARG)	0	0	1	1
Totals (6 entries)		16	18	15	49
