= Gymnastics at the Pan American Games – Women's floor =

Women's events at the Gymnastics at the Pan American Games were first held at the 1959 Pan American Games.

Three medals are awarded: gold for first place, silver for second place, and bronze for third place. Tie breakers have not been used in every year. In the event of a tie between two gymnasts, both names are listed, and the following position (second for a tie for first, third for a tie for second) is left empty because a medal was not awarded for that position. If three gymnastics tied for a position, the following two positions are left empty.

== Medalists ==
Year	Location	Gold	Silver	Bronze
1959	(United States) Chicago	(Canada) Ernestine Russell	(United States) Theresa Montefusco	(Canada) Marie-Claire Larsen
1963	(Brazil) São Paulo	(United States) Avis Tieber	(Canada) Susan McDonnell	(United States) Kathleen Corrigan
1967	(Canada) Winnipeg	(United States) Linda Metheny	(United States) Joyce Tanac	(United States) Donna Schaenzer
1971	(Colombia) Cali	(United States) Linda Metheny	(United States) Kim Chace	(United States) Roxanne Pierce (Canada) Lise Arsenault (Canada) Jennifer Diachun
1975	Mexico City	(United States) Ann Carr	(United States) Kathy Howard	(United States) Roxanne Pierce (Cuba) Vicenta Cruzata
1979	(Puerto Rico) San Juan	(United States) Jeanine Creek	(United States) Heidi Anderson	(Canada) Monica Goermann
1983	(Venezuela) Caracas	(United States) Yumi Mordre	(Cuba) Orisel Martinez	(United States) Lisa Wittwer
1987	(United States) Indianapolis	(United States) Kristie Phillips	(United States) Sabrina Mar	(Cuba) Laura Rodriguez
1991	(Cuba) Havana	(United States) Chelle Stack	(Cuba) Dayami Nunez	(Cuba) Georgina Benítez
1995	(Argentina) Mar del Plata	(United States) Shannon Miller	(United States) Amanda Borden	(Cuba) Leyanet Gonzalez
1999	(Canada) Winnipeg	(Canada) Yvonne Tousek	(Canada) Michelle Conway	(Brazil) Daiane dos Santos
2003	(Dominican Republic) Santo Domingo	(United States) Tia Orlando	(Mexico) Brenda Magaña	(United States) Nastia Liukin
2007	(Brazil) Rio de Janeiro	(United States) Rebecca Bross	(United States) Shawn Johnson	(Brazil) Jade Barbosa
2011	(Mexico) Guadalajara	(Mexico) Ana Lago	(Canada) Mikaela Gerber	(Brazil) Daniele Hypólito
2015	(Canada) Toronto	(Canada) Ellie Black	(United States) Amelia Hundley	(Guatemala) Ana Sofía Gómez
2019	(Peru) Lima	(Canada) Brooklyn Moors	(United States) Kara Eaker	(Brazil) Flávia Saraiva
2023	(Chile) Santiago	(United States) Kaliya Lincoln	(United States) Kayla DiCello (Brazil) Flávia Saraiva	—N/a

== Medal table ==
Rank	Nation	Gold	Silver	Bronze	Total
1	United States (USA)	12	11	6	29
2	Canada (CAN)	4	3	4	11
3	Mexico (MEX)	1	1	0	2
4	Cuba (CUB)	0	2	4	6
5	Brazil (BRA)	0	1	4	5
6	Guatemala (GUA)	0	0	1	1
Totals (6 entries)		17	18	19	54
