= Gymnastics at the Pan American Games – Women's vault =

Women's events at the Gymnastics at the Pan American Games were first held at the 1959 Pan American Games.

Three medals are awarded: gold for first place, silver for second place, and bronze for third place. Tie breakers have not been used in every year. In the event of a tie between two gymnasts, both names are listed, and the following position (second for a tie for first, third for a tie for second) is left empty because a medal was not awarded for that position. If three gymnastics tied for a position, the following two positions are left empty.

== Medalists ==
Year	Location	Gold	Silver	Bronze
1959	(United States) Chicago	(Canada) Ernestine Russell	(United States) Betty Maycock	(Canada) Louise Parker
1963	(Brazil) São Paulo	(United States) Dale McClements	(United States) Avis Tieber	(United States) Kathleen Corrigan
1967	(Canada) Winnipeg	(United States) Linda Metheny	(United States) Donna Schaenzer	(United States) Marie Walther
1971	(Colombia) Cali	(United States) Roxanne Pierce	(Cuba) Miriam Villacian	(United States) Adele Gleaves
1975	Mexico City	(United States) Kolleen Casey	(United States) Debbie Willcox	(United States) Roxanne Pierce
1979	(Puerto Rico) San Juan	(United States) Jackie Cassello	(Canada) Elfi Schlegal	(Cuba) Elsa Chivas (Cuba) Tania Gonzalez
1983	(Venezuela) Caracas	(Cuba) Orisel Martinez	(Cuba) Luisa Prieto	(United States) Lisa Wittwer
1987	(United States) Indianapolis	(Cuba) Laura Rodríguez	(Cuba) Luisa Prieto	(United States) Kristie Phillips
1991	(Cuba) Havana	(Brazil) Luisa Parente	(United States) Anne Woyernowski	(Canada) Jennifer Wood
1995	(Argentina) Mar del Plata	(United States) Amy Chow	(United States) Shannon Miller	(Cuba) Annia Portuondo
1999	(Canada) Winnipeg	(Cuba) Arazay Jova	(Brazil) Daiane dos Santos	(Venezuela) Eddylin Zabaleta
2003	(Dominican Republic) Santo Domingo	(Cuba) Leyanet Gonzalez	(United States) Courtney McCool	(Mexico) Brenda Magaña
2007	(Brazil) Rio de Janeiro	(Brazil) Jade Barbosa	(United States) Amber Trani	(Brazil) Laís Souza
2011	(Mexico) Guadalajara	(United States) Brandie Jay	(Mexico) Elsa García	(Colombia) Catalina Escobar
2015	(Canada) Toronto	(Cuba) Marcia Videaux	(Dominican Republic) Yamilet Peña	(Canada) Ellie Black
2019	(Peru) Lima	(Canada) Ellie Black	(Cuba) Yesenia Ferrera	(Canada) Shallon Olsen
2023	(Chile) Santiago	(Brazil) Rebeca Andrade	(United States) Jordan Chiles	(Mexico) Natalia Escalera

== Medal table ==
Rank	Nation	Gold	Silver	Bronze	Total
1	United States (USA)	7	8	6	21
2	Cuba (CUB)	5	4	3	12
3	Canada (CAN)	2	1	4	7
4	Brazil (BRA)	2	1	1	4
5	Mexico (MEX)	0	1	1	2
6	Dominican Republic (DOM)	0	1	0	1
7	Colombia (COL)	0	0	1	1
7	Venezuela (VEN)	0	0	1	1
Totals (8 entries)		16	16	17	49
