= Gymnastics at the Pan American Games – Women's balance beam =

Women's events at the Gymnastics at the Pan American Games were first held at the 1959 Pan American Games.

Three medals are awarded: gold for first place, silver for second place, and bronze for third place. Tie breakers have not been used in every year. In the event of a tie between two gymnasts, both names are listed, and the following position (second for a tie for first, third for a tie for second) is left empty because a medal was not awarded for that position. If three gymnastics tied for a position, the following two positions are left empty.

== Medalists ==
Year	Location	Gold	Silver	Bronze
1959	(United States) Chicago	(United States) Theresa Montefusco	(Canada) Ernestine Russell	(United States) Sharon Phelps
1963	(Brazil) São Paulo	(United States) Doris Fuchs	(Canada) Dorothy Haworth	(Canada) Gail Daley
1967	(Canada) Winnipeg	(United States) Linda Metheny	(United States) Deborah Bailey	(Cuba) Zulima Bregado
1971	(Colombia) Cali	(United States) Kim Chace	(Cuba) Vivian Garcia	(United States) Linda Metheny (United States) Roxanne Pierce
1975	Mexico City	(United States) Ann Carr	(United States) Kolleen Casey	(United States) Roxanne Pierce
1979	(Puerto Rico) San Juan	(Canada) Sherry Hawco	(United States) Jackie Cassello	(Cuba) Elsa Chivas (Canada) Monica Goermann
1983	(Venezuela) Caracas	(Cuba) Elsa Chivas	(Cuba) Orisel Martinez	(United States) Tracy Butler
1987	(United States) Indianapolis	(United States) Kelly Garrison	(Cuba) Tania Guia	(United States) Sabrina Mar (Cuba) Elsa Chivas
1991	(Cuba) Havana	(Cuba) Leyanet Gonzalez (United States) Stephanie Woods	—	(Cuba) Odaimis Jimenez (Guatemala) Luisa Portocarrero
1995	(Argentina) Mar del Plata	(United States) Amanda Borden	(Cuba) Annia Portuondo	(Cuba) Leyanet Gonzalez
1999	(Canada) Winnipeg	(Canada) Lise Leveille	(Argentina) Barbara Rivarola	(Argentina) Melina Sirolli
2003	(Dominican Republic) Santo Domingo	(United States) Nastia Liukin	(Brazil) Daniele Hypólito	(United States) Chellsie Memmel
2007	(Brazil) Rio de Janeiro	(United States) Shawn Johnson	(United States) Nastia Liukin	(Brazil) Daniele Hypólito
2011	(Mexico) Guadalajara	(Guatemala) Ana Sofía Gómez	(Canada) Kristina Vaculik	(Brazil) Daniele Hypólito
2015	(Canada) Toronto	(Canada) Ellie Black	(United States) Megan Skaggs	(Canada) Victoria Woo
2019	(Peru) Lima	(United States) Kara Eaker	(Canada) Ellie Black	(United States) Riley McCusker
2023	(Chile) Santiago	(Brazil) Rebeca Andrade	(Brazil) Flávia Saraiva	(Canada) Ava Stewart

== Medal table ==
Rank	Nation	Gold	Silver	Bronze	Total
1	United States (USA)	11	5	8	24
2	Canada (CAN)	3	4	4	11
3	Cuba (CUB)	2	4	5	11
4	Brazil (BRA)	1	2	2	5
5	Guatemala (GUA)	1	0	1	2
6	Argentina (ARG)	0	1	1	2
Totals (6 entries)		18	16	21	55
