= Gymnastics at the Pan American Games – Women's uneven bars =

Women's events at the Gymnastics at the Pan American Games were first held at the 1959 Pan American Games.

Three medals are awarded: gold for first place, silver for second place, and bronze for third place. Tie breakers have not been used in every year. In the event of a tie between two gymnasts, both names are listed, and the following position (second for a tie for first, third for a tie for second) is left empty because a medal was not awarded for that position. If three gymnastics tied for a position, the following two positions are left empty.

== Medalists ==
Year	Location	Gold	Silver	Bronze
1959	(United States) Chicago	(Canada) Ernestine Russell	(United States) Betty Maycock	(United States) Cassie Collawn
1963	(Brazil) São Paulo	(United States) Doris Fuchs	(United States) Dale McClements	(Cuba) Yolanda Williams
1967	(Canada) Winnipeg	(Canada) Susan McDonnell	(United States) Linda Metheny	(United States) Kathy Gleason
1971	(Colombia) Cali	(United States) Roxanne Pierce	(United States) Linda Metheny	(United States) Kim Chace
1975	Mexico City	(United States) Ann Carr (United States) Roxanne Pierce	—	(United States) Diane Dunbar
1979	(Puerto Rico) San Juan	(Canada) Monica Goermann	(Canada) Elfi Schlegal	(Cuba) Tania Gonzalez
1983	(Venezuela) Caracas	(United States) Lucy Wener	(United States) Lisa Wittwer	(Cuba) Tania Gonzalez
1987	(United States) Indianapolis	(United States) Melissa Marlowe	(United States) Sabrina Mar	(Brazil) Luisa Parente
1991	(Cuba) Havana	(Brazil) Luisa Parente	(United States) Hillary Anderson (Canada) Mylene Fleury	—
1995	(Argentina) Mar del Plata	(United States) Shannon Miller	(United States) Amy Chow	(Cuba) Annia Portuondo
1999	(Canada) Winnipeg	(Canada) Yvonne Tousek	(Canada) Julie Beaulieu	(United States) Morgan White
2003	(Dominican Republic) Santo Domingo	(United States) Chellsie Memmel	(Brazil) Daniele Hypólito	(United States) Nastia Liukin
2007	(Brazil) Rio de Janeiro	(United States) Shawn Johnson	(United States) Nastia Liukin	(Brazil) Laís Souza
2011	(Mexico) Guadalajara	(United States) Bridgette Caquatto	(United States) Shawn Johnson	(Mexico) Elsa García (Mexico) Marisela Cantu
2015	(Canada) Toronto	(United States) Rachel Gowey	(Venezuela) Jessica López	(United States) Amelia Hundley
2019	(Peru) Lima	(United States) Riley McCusker	(United States) Leanne Wong	(Canada) Ellie Black
2023	(Chile) Santiago	(United States) Zoe Miller	(Brazil) Rebeca Andrade	(Brazil) Flávia Saraiva

== Medal table ==
Rank	Nation	Gold	Silver	Bronze	Total
1	United States (USA)	12	11	7	30
2	Canada (CAN)	4	3	1	8
3	Brazil (BRA)	1	1	2	4
4	Venezuela (VEN)	0	1	0	1
5	Cuba (CUB)	0	0	4	4
6	Mexico (MEX)	0	0	2	2
Totals (6 entries)		17	16	16	49
