= Gymnastics at the 1975 Pan American Games =

Gymnastics at the 1975 Pan American Games in Mexico City, Mexico.

== Men's events ==
Event	Gold	Silver	Bronze
Individual all-around	Jorge Cuervo; Cuba	Roberto Richard; Cuba	Kurt Thomas; United States
Team all-around	United States	Cuba	Mexico
Floor exercise	Peter Kormann; United States	Jorge Cuervo; Cuba	Bart Conner; United States
Horizontal bar	Jorge Cuervo; Cuba	Gene Whelan; United States	Kurt Thomas; United States
Parallel bars	Roberto Richard; Cuba	Gene Whelan; United States	Jorge Cuervo; Cuba
Pommel horse	Roberto Richard; Cuba	Kurt Thomas; United States	Gene Whelan; United States
Rings	Jorge Cuervo; Cuba Roberto Richard; Cuba	None awarded	Bart Conner; United States
Vault	Jorge Cuervo; Cuba	Kurt Thomas; United States	Marshall Avener; United States

== Women's events ==
Event	Gold	Silver	Bronze
Individual all-around	Ann Carr; United States	Roxanne Pierce; United States	Kolleen Casey; United States
Team all-around	United States	Cuba	Mexico
Balance beam	Ann Carr; United States	Kolleen Casey; United States	Roxanne Pierce; United States
Floor exercise	Ann Carr; United States	Kathy Howard; United States	Vicenta Cruzata; Cuba Roxanne Pierce; United States
Uneven bars	Ann Carr; United States Roxanne Pierce; United States	None awarded	Diane Dunbar; United States
Vault	Kolleen Casey; United States	Debbie Willcox; United States	Roxanne Pierce; United States

== Medal table ==
Rank	Nation	Gold	Silver	Bronze	Total
1	United States	9	8	11	28
2	Cuba	7	4	2	13
3	Mexico	0	0	2	2
Totals (3 entries)		16	12	15	43

== See also ==
- Pan American Gymnastics Championships
- South American Gymnastics Championships
- Gymnastics at the 1976 Summer Olympics
