= Louise Parker =

Louise Parker may refer to:

- Louise Parker (contralto) (1926–1986), American opera singer
- Louise Parker (gymnast) (1942–2001), Canadian gymnast
