= Gymnastics at the 1979 Pan American Games =

Gymnastics at the 1979 Pan American Games in San Juan, Puerto Rico.

== Men's events ==
Event	Gold	Silver	Bronze
Team all-around	Cuba; Casimiro Suárez; Jorge Roche; Enrique Bravo; Roberto Richard; Adolfo Fernández; Mario Castro	Canada; Warren Long; Joan Choquette; Mark Epprecht; Nigel Rothwell; Pierre Clavel; Owen Walstrom	Brazil; Helio de Araújo; João Ribeiro; Reinaldo Ferreira; Mario Albuquerque; Altair Rodrigues; João Tavares
Individual all-around	Casimiro Suárez; Cuba	Jorge Roche; Cuba	Enrique Bravo; Cuba Warren Long; Canada
Floor exercise	Casimiro Suárez; Cuba	Warren Long; Canada	Jorge Roche; Cuba
Pommel horse	Roberto Richard; Cuba	Enrique Bravo; Cuba	Jean Choquette; Canada
Rings	Jorge Roche; Cuba	Mario Castro; Cuba	Jeff LaFleur; United States
Vault	Casimiro Suárez; Cuba	Warren Long; Canada	Ricardo Mazabel; Peru
Parallel bars	Roberto Richard; Cuba	Daniel Muenz; United States	Enrique Bravo; Cuba
Horizontal bar	Jorge Roche; Cuba	Roberto Richard; Cuba	Warren Long; Canada

== Women's events ==
Event	Gold	Silver	Bronze
Team all-around	Canada; Monica Goermann; Elfi Schlegel; Sherry Hawco; Diana Carnegie; Ellen Stewart; Carmen Alie; Shannon Fleming	Cuba; Tania González; Elsa Chivas; Orisel Martínez; Vicenta Cruzata; Zulma Rodríguez; Anet Rubido; Ileana Pérez	Mexico; Esther Thomas; Gabriela Apellaniz; Michelle Popoff; Olga Brito; Estela de la Torre; Patricia Garcia; Ivonne Chirino Barcelo
Individual all-around	Monica Goermann; Canada	Jeanine Creek; United States	Elfi Schlegel; Canada
Vault	Jackie Cassello; United States	Elfi Schlegel; Canada	Elsa Chivas; Cuba Tania González; Cuba
Uneven bars	Monica Goermann; Canada	Elfi Schlegel; Canada Tania González; Cuba	—N/a
Balance beam	Sherry Hawco; Canada	Jackie Cassello; United States	Elsa Chivas; Cuba Monica Goermann; Canada
Floor exercise	Jeanine Creek; United States	Heidi Anderson; United States Monica Goermann; Canada	—N/a

== See also ==
- Pan American Gymnastics Championships
- South American Gymnastics Championships
- Gymnastics at the 1980 Summer Olympics
- 1979 World Artistic Gymnastics Championships
