= Elfi Schlegel =

Canadian gymnast and sports broadcaster

- Born: 17 May 1964 (age 62) Toronto, Ontario, Canada

Gymnastics career
- Discipline: Women's artistic gymnastics
- Country represented: Canada
- College team: University of Florida
Medal record
Representing Canada
World Cup Final
Bronze medal – third place	1980 Toronto	Vault
Commonwealth Games
Gold medal – first place	1978 Edmonton	All-Around
Gold medal – first place	1978 Edmonton	Team
Pan American Games
Gold medal – first place	1979 San Jaun	Team
Silver medal – second place	1979 San Juan	Uneven Bars
Silver medal – second place	1979 San Juan	Vault
Bronze medal – third place	1979 San Juan	All-Around

Elfi Schlegel (born May 17, 1964) is a Canadian gymnast and commentator. She competed in four NCAA women's gymnastics tournaments for the Florida Gators women's gymnastics team and won gold medals at the 1978 Commonwealth Games and 1979 Pan American Games. She was chosen to represent Canada at the 1980 Summer Olympics, but did not compete due to the 1980 Summer Olympics boycott. She covered the sport as a commentator for CTV (1984–1988), CBC (1988–1992), and NBC (1992–2012).

== Early years ==
Schlegel was born in Toronto, Ontario, to parents Peter and Vlasta Schlegel, immigrants from Switzerland. Growing up in the Toronto suburb of Etobicoke, she started gymnastics at the age of 7. She attended Silverthorn Collegiate Institute in Toronto, and graduated with her diploma after her grade twelve year—a year early in the (then) thirteen-year Ontario education system.

== International career ==
Schlegel established herself as one of the best gymnasts in Canadian history (at that point) when she won a gold medal in the all-around and team competitions in gymnastics at the 1978 Commonwealth Games in Edmonton, Alberta. At the 1979 Pan American Games in San Juan, Puerto Rico, she won a bronze medal in the individual all around, two silver medals for the uneven bars and vault, and a gold medal as a member of the first-place Canadian team. She also won a bronze medal in the vault at the 1980 World Cup in Toronto, the first-ever World Cup medal for a Canadian.

She was selected as a member of the Canadian national team for the 1980 Summer Olympics in Moscow, Russia, but was unable to participate when Canada joined the United States–led boycott of the Moscow Games in protest of the invasion of Afghanistan by the Soviet Union.

== College career ==
After graduation from high school, Schlegel wanted to continue to compete, but Canadian universities did not offer intercollegiate gymnastics competition or athletic scholarships. She sought and received an athletic scholarship to attend the University of Florida in Gainesville, Florida, where she was a member of coach Ernestine Weaver's Florida Gators women's gymnastics team in National Collegiate Athletic Association (NCAA) competition from 1982 to 1986. As a Gator gymnast, she was a four-time individual Southeastern Conference (SEC) champion–all-around (1983), twice in the balance beam (1983, 1986), and vault (1984). The Gators qualified for the NCAA national championship tournament all four of Schlegel's years on the team, and finished third at the 1983 NCAA tournament. She received six All-American honours.

Schlegel graduated from Florida with a bachelor's degree in telecommunications production in 1986, and was inducted into the University of Florida Athletic Hall of Fame as a "Gator Great" in 1997.

== Broadcasting career ==
In 1984, Schlegel began her television career as a gymnastics commentator for CTV's Wide World of Sports. She covered the Gymnastics at the 1988 Summer Olympics for CBC. Schlegel was a gymnastics analyst on NBC's Olympic broadcasts from 1992 to 2012. She also covered the Breeders Cup and Olympic curling for the network.

== Personal ==
Schlegel is married to Marc Dunn, a former Olympian who represented Canada in beach volleyball at the 1996 Summer Olympics. They have three children and live in Toronto.

== See also ==
- Florida Gators
- List of University of Florida alumni
- List of University of Florida Athletic Hall of Fame members

== Bibliography ==
- Caraccioli, Jerry, & Tom Caraccioli, Boycott: Stolen Dreams of the 1980 Moscow Olympic Games, New Chapter Press, Washington, D.C. (2009). ISBN 978-0-942257-54-0.
- Schlegel, Elfi, & Claire Ross Dunn, The Gymnastics Book: The Young Performer's Guide to Gymnastics, Firefly Books Ltd., Richmond Hill, Ontario (2001). ISBN 978-1-55209-414-3.
