= Sherry Hawco =

Canadian artistic gymnast

- Born: February 17, 1964
- Died: October 26, 1991 (aged 27)

Gymnastics career
Medal record
Gymnastics
Commonwealth Games
Gold medal – first place	1978 Edmonton	Team
Silver medal – second place	1978 Edmonton	All-around
Pan American Games
Gold medal – first place	1979 San Juan	Team
Gold medal – first place	1979 San Juan	Beam

Sherry Louise Hawco (February 17, 1964 – October 26, 1991) was a Canadian gymnast.

Hawco competed at the 1978 Commonwealth Games where she won a gold medal in the women's team event and a silver medal in the women's all-around event. She also won two gold medals at the 1979 Pan American Games in the beam and women's team events. She suffered a knee injury in 1981 and retired from gymnastics in 1982.

Hawco underwent surgery for breast cancer in 1990 but stopped having chemotherapy after learning she was pregnant. She died on October 26, 1991, 7 weeks after giving birth to her son, Brandon. She was inducted into the Cambridge Sports Hall of Fame in 1997.
