= Gail Sontgerath =

American gymnast

Personal information
- Nationality: American
- Born: March 11, 1944 (age 81); New Jersey, United States

Sport
- Sport: Gymnastics

Gail Sontgerath (born March 11, 1944) is an American gymnast. She was the 1960 U.S. Women's National Amateur Athletic Union Gymnastics Champion. She competed in six events at the 1960 Summer Olympics.

Raised in Dover, New Jersey, Sontgerath moved to Florida as a child, graduating from Palm Beach High School and Florida State University. In March 1961, she appeared as a mystery contestant on the television quiz show To Tell the Truth, where she was described as the highest scoring U.S. women's gymnast at the 1960 Summer Olympics.
