= Ivana Hong =

American artistic gymnast

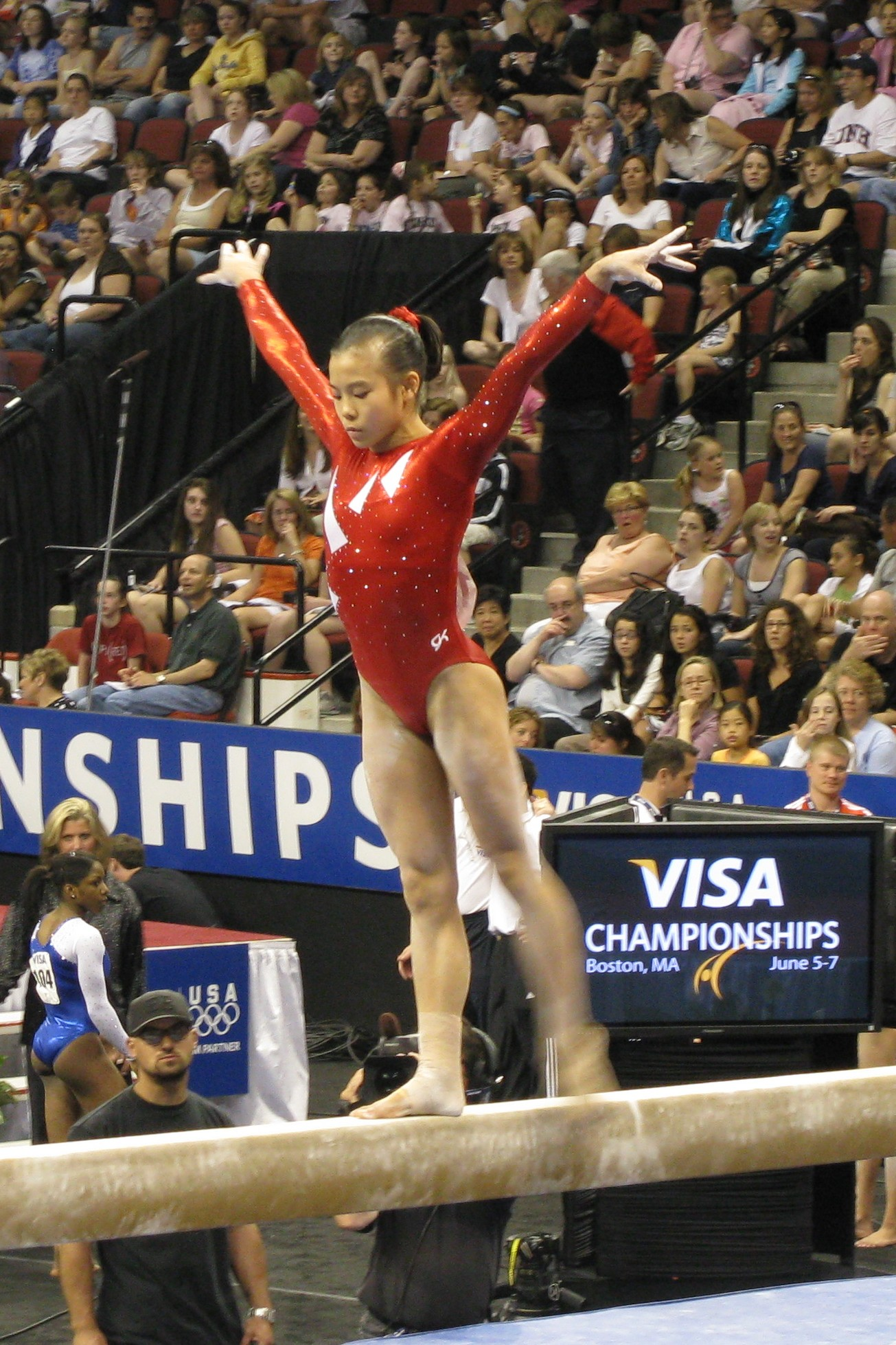
- Hong at the 2008 U.S. National Championships

Personal information
- Full name: Ivana Hong
- Born: December 11, 1992 (age 33) Worcester, Massachusetts
- Height: 157 cm (5 ft 2 in)

Gymnastics career
- Discipline: Women's artistic gymnastics
- Country represented: United States (2005–10 (US))
- College team: Stanford Cardinal
- Club: WOGA
- Head coach: Valeri Liukin
- Assistant coach: Natalya Marakova
- Former coaches: Al Fong, Armine Barutian-Fong
- Music: Armenian Duduk (2008), My Sweet and Tender Beast (2009)
Medal record
Gymnastics
Representing United States
World Championships
Gold medal – first place	2007 Stuttgart	Team
Bronze medal – third place	2009 London	Balance Beam
Pan American Games
Gold medal – first place	Rio de Janeiro 2007	Team
Bronze medal – third place	Rio de Janeiro 2007	All-Around
Visa Championships
Gold medal – first place	2009 Dallas	Balance Beam
Gold medal – first place	2009 Dallas	Vault
Silver medal – second place	2009 Dallas	All-Around

Ivana Hong (born December 11, 1992, in Worcester, Massachusetts) is an American former artistic gymnast. She was a member of the gold medal American team at the 2007 World Artistic Gymnastics Championships and the all-around bronze medalist at the 2007 Pan American Games. Hong was named an alternate to the 2008 U.S. Olympic team and was a member of the U.S. Women's Team in the 2009 World Artistic Gymnastics Championships in London.

Hong is of Chinese and Vietnamese ancestry. Hong lived in Blue Springs, Missouri, and trained at Great American Gymnastics Express (GAGE) for four years. She also trained under Valeri Liukin at the World Olympic Gymnastics Academy (WOGA). She competed for Stanford University from 2012 to 2016.

== Gymnastics career ==
Hong became a junior international elite in 2004 and qualified to her first United States Junior National Championships at age eleven. She was named to the Junior National Team for the first time following the 2005 National Championships, a feat she repeated in 2006 after a fifth-place finish in the all-around.

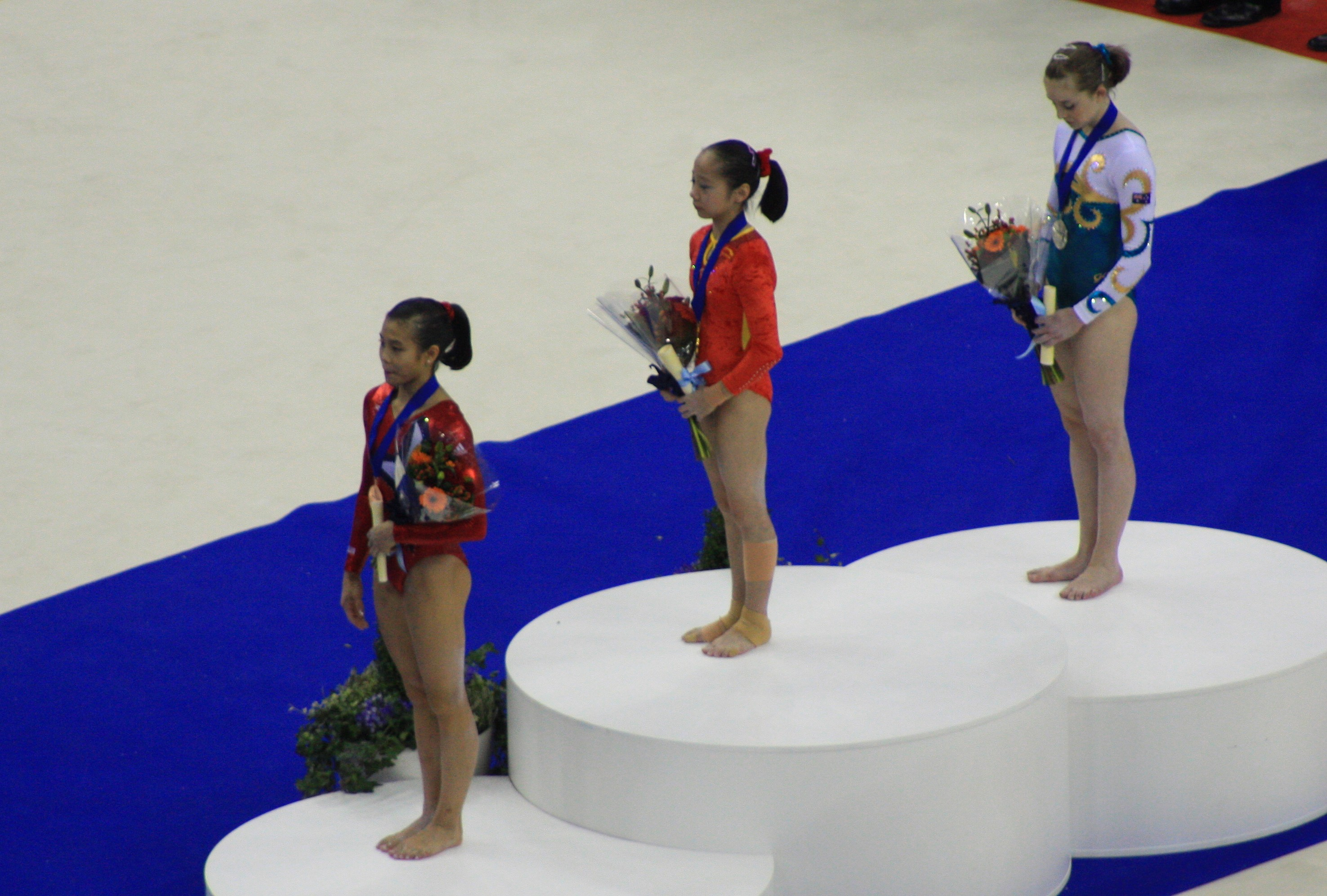
Hong winning bronze on balance beam at the 2009 World Championships

Hong became a Senior International Elite in 2007. She was part of the gold medal-winning U.S. team at 2007 Pan-American Games and won the bronze medal in the all-around competition. This and a strong showing at the 2007 Visa National Championships assured her place on the U.S. World Championships team, which again won the gold medal.

The following year, Hong was named to the 2008–2009 U.S. Senior National team, and was invited to the 2008 Olympic Trials. Hong's skill as an all-around athlete without a weak event enabled her to be named, along with Jana Bieger and Corrie Lothrop, as one of three alternates for the U.S. Olympic team.

Following the Olympics, Hong left her former gym and moved to WOGA to train with Valeri Liukin.

Hong finished second in the all-around at the 2009 U.S. National Championships with a total score of 117.250 in Dallas, Texas. She also won the national titles on the balance beam (with a combined score of 30.350) and the vault (combined score 29.950).

At the 2009 World Championships in London, Ivana scored a 14.550 on balance beam to win the bronze medal on that event. This made medalists of all four American gymnasts (Bridget Sloan, Kayla Williams and Rebecca Bross in addition to Hong) in the women's competition.

In early March 2010, Hong tore the anterior cruciate ligament in her right knee at the National Team training camp as she landed a vault. She subsequently spent several months out of training, recovering from surgery.

She was inducted into the USA Gymnastics Hall of Fame as a member of the class of 2024.
