= Sharon Richardson =

American gymnast (born 1943)

Personal information
- Nationality: American
- Born: May 26, 1943 (age 81); Albion, Wisconsin, United States

Sport
- Sport: Gymnastics

Sharon Richardson (born May 26, 1943) is an American gymnast. She competed in six events at the 1960 Summer Olympics.
