= Linda Metheny =

American artistic gymnast

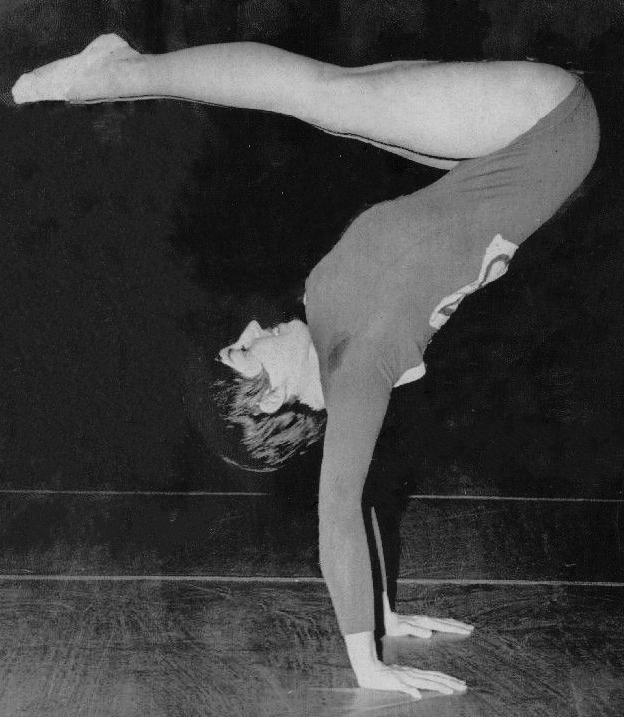
- Metheny in 1967

Personal information
- Born: August 12, 1947 (age 78) Olney, Illinois, U.S.
- Height: 156 cm (5 ft 1 in)
- Weight: 46 kg (101 lb)

Sport
- Sport: Artistic gymnastics
- Club: McKinley YMCA
Medal record
Representing the United States
Pan American Games
Gold medal – first place	1967 Winnipeg	Team
Gold medal – first place	1967 Winnipeg	All-around
Gold medal – first place	1967 Winnipeg	Vault
Gold medal – first place	1967 Winnipeg	Floor
Gold medal – first place	1967 Winnipeg	Balance beam
Silver medal – second place	1967 Winnipeg	Uneven bars
Gold medal – first place	1971 Cali	Team
Gold medal – first place	1971 Cali	Floor
Silver medal – second place	1971 Cali	All-around
Silver medal – second place	1971 Cali	Uneven bars
Bronze medal – third place	1971 Cali	Balance beam

Linda Joan Metheny-Mulvihill (born August 12, 1947) is a retired American artistic gymnast. She won seven gold, three silver and one bronze medal at the Pan American Games in 1967 and 1971, and served as the flag bearer for the American team in 1971. She competed at the 1964, 1968 and 1972 Olympics with the best individual result of fourth place on the balance beam in 1968, becoming the first American gymnast to qualify to an Olympic event final. Domestically she won at least 18 individual national titles. In 1985 she was inducted into the U.S. Gymnastic Hall of Fame.

Metheny started competing in 1962, and between 1964 and 1973 was a member of the national team. After the 1964 Olympics she enrolled at the University of Illinois as their only female gymnast. After retiring from competition she became a gymnastics coach working together with her husband Dick Mulvihill, and worked as an international referee. She judged at the World Cup in 2000, at the world championships in 1994, 1995, 2002 and 2003, and at the Olympic Games in 1996 and 2000. Together with her husband she has run the National Academy of Artistic Gymnastics in Eugene, Oregon, since 1973.
