= Marie Walther =

American gymnast (born 1944)

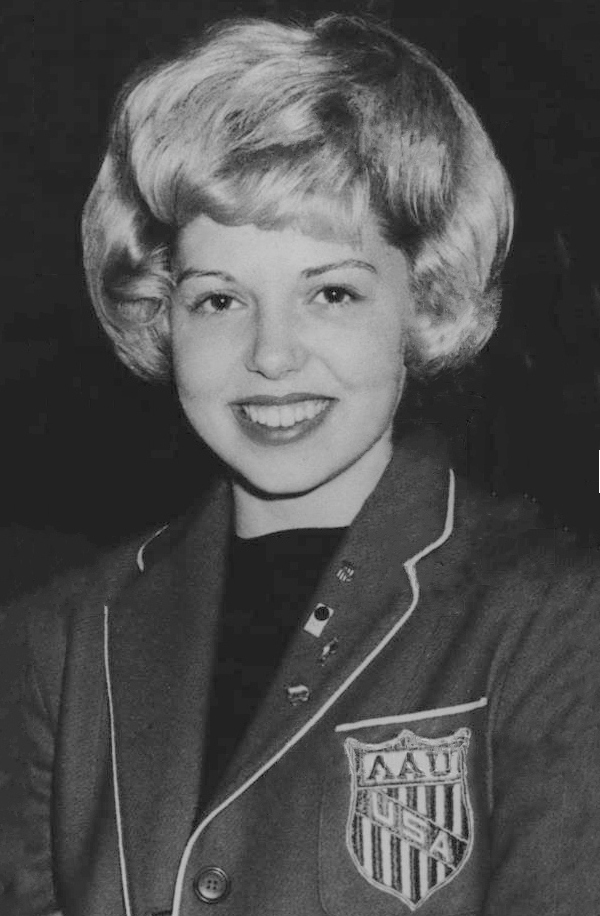
- Walther in 1963

Personal information
- Born: December 8, 1944 (age 81) Cleveland, Ohio, U.S.
- Height: 155 cm (5 ft 1 in)
- Weight: 48 kg (106 lb)

Sport
- Sport: Artistic gymnastics
- Club: Kent State Golden Flashes
Medal record
Representing the United States
Pan American Games
Gold medal – first place	1963 São Paulo	Team
Gold medal – first place	1967 Winnipeg	Team
Bronze medal – third place	1967 Winnipeg	All-around
Bronze medal – third place	1967 Winnipeg	Vault

Marie Susan "Sue" Walther (later Bilski, later Kuhlman; born December 8, 1944) is a retired American artistic gymnast. She won two gold and two bronze medals at the Pan American Games in 1963 and 1967. She competed at the 1964 Summer Olympics with the best individual result of 29th place in the floor exercise. Her sister Jackie was also a competitive gymnast.
