= Donna Schaenzer =

American artistic gymnast

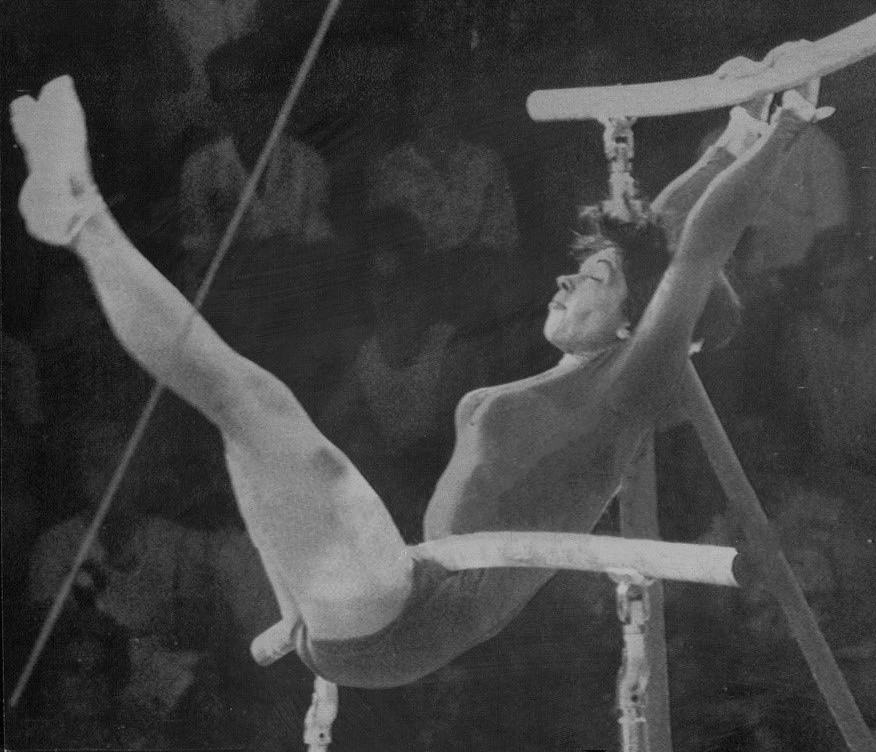
- Schaenzer at the 1967 Pan American Game

Sport
- Sport: Artistic gymnastics
Medal record
Representing the United States
Pan American Games
Gold medal – first place	1967 Winnipeg	Team
Silver medal – second place	1967 Winnipeg	Vault
Bronze medal – third place	1967 Winnipeg	Floor

Donna Schaenzer Kramer is a retired American artistic gymnast. She won a gold, a silver and a bronze medal at the 1967 Pan American Games, and a silver at the 1966 Trampoline World Championships. She held the national all-around title in 1963 and 1966. Between 1979 and 1985, she worked as gymnastics coach at Iowa State University.
