= Judy Klauser =

American artistic gymnast

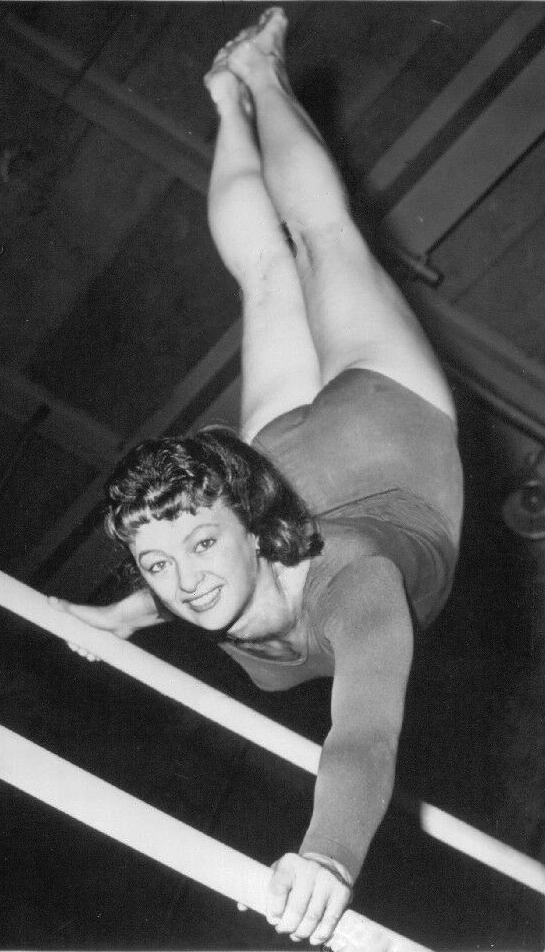
- Klauser in 1960

Personal information
- Born: 1940 (age 85–86)
- Education: Flint Junior College, Michigan

Sport
- Sport: Artistic gymnastics
- Coached by: Herb Vogel
Medal record
Representing the United States
Pan American Games
Gold medal – first place	1959 Chicago	Team

Judy Klauser (born c. 1940) is a retired American gymnast. She won a team gold medal at the 1959 Pan American Games, and the individual all-round AAU junior championship in 1961.
