= Kimberly Chace =

American artistic gymnast

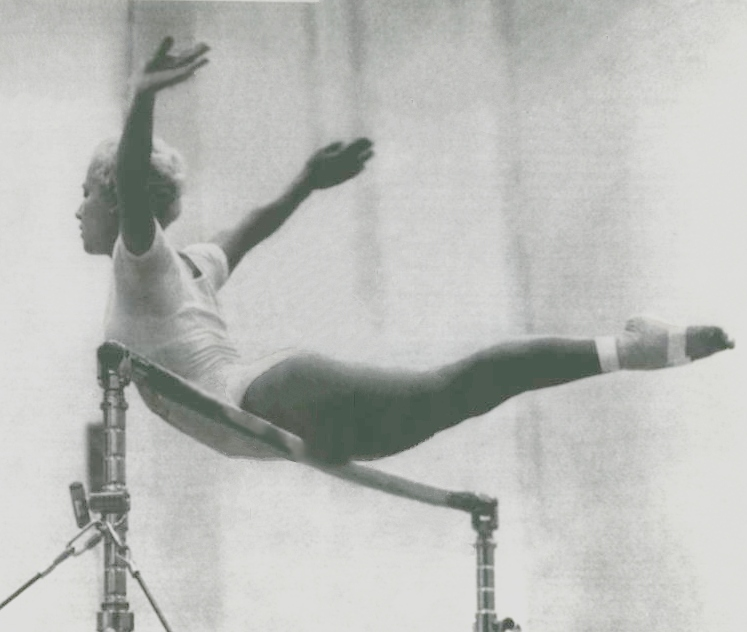
- Chace in 1976

Personal information
- Born: Kimberly Ann Chace; May 4, 1956 (age 70) Manchester, Tennessee, U.S.
- Height: 5 ft 2 in (157 cm)
- Weight: 110 lb (50 kg)

Sport
- Sport: Artistic gymnastics
- Club: Chace School of Gymnastics
Medal record
Representing the United States
Pan American Games
Gold medal – first place	1971 Cali	Team
Gold medal – first place	1971 Cali	Balance beam
Silver medal – second place	1971 Cali	Floor
Bronze medal – third place	1971 Cali	All-around
Bronze medal – third place	1971 Cali	Uneven bars

Kimberly Ann Chace (later Boyle, then May, born May 4, 1956) is an American retired artistic gymnast, who competed at the 1972 and 1976 Summer Olympics and placed 14th all around in 1972; her teams finished fourth in 1972 and sixth in 1976. She also won five medals at the 1971 Pan American Games, including two gold medals. In 1996, Chace was inducted into the USA Gymnastics Hall of Fame.

Chace was trained by her father. In July 1973 she married Chuck Boyle. They had a child, Christopher Boyle, born in 1974, and briefly ran their own gymnastics club, before divorcing by 1976. She then made her comeback to sports and finished at 14th place in the Olympic Games which was the highest in the US women's team.

== Competitive history ==
Year	Event	Team	AA	VT	UB	BB	FX
Junior
1966	Sarasota National Gymnastics Clinic				2nd place, silver medalist(s)		3rd place, bronze medalist(s)
1967	Florida AAU JO Championships		2nd place, silver medalist(s)	2nd place, silver medalist(s)		4	
1967	Sarasota National Gymnastics Clinic		1st place, gold medalist(s)		1st place, gold medalist(s)		1st place, gold medalist(s)
1968	AAU Regional Championships		2nd place, silver medalist(s)				
1968	Florida AAU JO Championships	1st place, gold medalist(s)	1st place, gold medalist(s)				
1968	Sarasota National Gymnastics Clinic		1st place, gold medalist(s)		1st place, gold medalist(s)	1st place, gold medalist(s)	1st place, gold medalist(s)
1968	Southwest Florida Invitational Championships	1st place, gold medalist(s)	1st place, gold medalist(s)				
1968	Valastic Invitational		1st place, gold medalist(s)				
1969	AAU JO Nationals		1st place, gold medalist(s)		1st place, gold medalist(s)		1st place, gold medalist(s)
1969	AAU Regional Championships		1st place, gold medalist(s)				
1969	Gold Coast District AAU Meet		1st place, gold medalist(s)				
Senior
1970	AAU Championships		6				
1970	Manitoba World Invitational	2nd place, silver medalist(s)	8				3rd place, bronze medalist(s)
1970	World Trials		5	3rd place, bronze medalist(s)	1st place, gold medalist(s)		4
1970	World Championships	7	61				
1971	USA-USSR Dual Meet	2nd place, silver medalist(s)	10				
1971	Pan American Trials		3rd place, bronze medalist(s)				
1971	Pan American Games	1st place, gold medalist(s)	3rd place, bronze medalist(s)	4	3rd place, bronze medalist(s)	1st place, gold medalist(s)	2nd place, silver medalist(s)
1971	USGF Championships		1st place, gold medalist(s)		1st place, gold medalist(s)	1st place, gold medalist(s)	1st place, gold medalist(s)
1971	World Cup		2nd place, silver medalist(s)				
1972	Chunichi Cup		6				
1972	Fukuoka Cup				5	5	
1972	Tokyo Cup		7				
1972	USA-JPN Dual Meet			3rd place, bronze medalist(s)			
1972	USGF Championships		3rd place, bronze medalist(s)			1st place, gold medalist(s)	3rd place, bronze medalist(s)
1972	Olympic Games	4	28				
1973	AAU Championships		3rd place, bronze medalist(s)			1st place, gold medalist(s)	2nd place, silver medalist(s)
1973	Antibes International		1st place, gold medalist(s)				
1973	USA-ROM Dual Meet		4				
1973	USGF Elite Championships		6	3rd place, bronze medalist(s)	2nd place, silver medalist(s)		5
1975	1st National Elite Qualification Meet		2nd place, silver medalist(s)				
1975	Region VIII Elite Qualifier		1st place, gold medalist(s)				
1976	USA-CAN-MEX Tri-Meet		6				
1976	U.S. Championships		5				4
1976	U.S. Olympic Trials		3rd place, bronze medalist(s)				
1976	Olympic Games	6	14				
