= Louise Parker (gymnast) =

Canadian gymnast

Personal information
- Full name: Louise Margaret Parker
- Born: 10 December 1942 Montreal, Quebec, Canada
- Died: 5 September 2001 (aged 58)

Sport
- Sport: Gymnastics

Louise Parker (10 December 1942 – 5 September 2001) was a Canadian gymnast. She competed in five events at the 1960 Summer Olympics.

== Personal life ==
Louise was married to gymnastics coach John Hemingway from 1964 until they divorced in the 1970s. The couple established the Flicka Gymnastics Club. Louise married Hugh Chesley in 1981 and remained married until her death in 2001.
