= Michelle Conway =

Canadian gymnast (born 1983)

Personal information
- Born: 24 November 1983 (age 41) Toronto, Ontario, Canada

Sport
- Sport: Gymnastics

Michelle Conway (born 24 November 1983) is a Canadian gymnast. She competed at the 2000 Summer Olympics.
