= Jackie Cassello =

American gymnast

Jackie Cassello is an American gymnast.

== Gymnastic career ==
Cassello left home at the age of 11 to live with gymnastic coaches Margie and Gregor Weiss. In 1979, at age thirteen, she won a gymnastics gold medal in the Pan American Games.

== Original "Supersister" ==
In 1979, the Supersisters trading card set was produced and distributed; one of the cards featured Cassello's name and picture.
