= Rebecca Bross =

American artistic gymnast

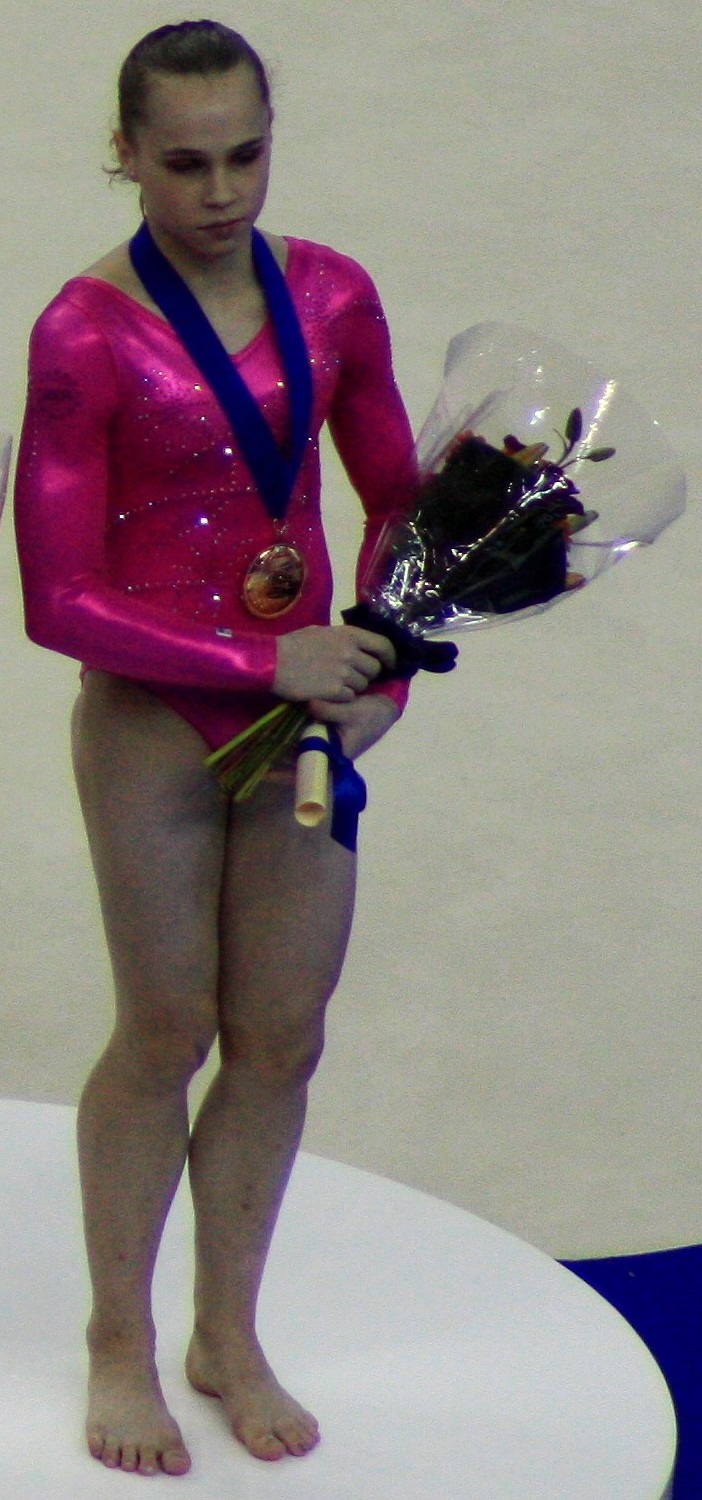
- Bross at the 2009 World Championships

Personal information
- Full name: Rebecca Marie Bross
- Nicknames: Becky; Becca; Bross the Boss
- Born: July 11, 1993 (age 33) Ann Arbor, Michigan, U.S.
- Height: 5 ft 0 in (152 cm)
- Spouse: Billy Burks

Gymnastics career
- Discipline: Women's artistic gymnastics
- Country represented: United States (2005–2012)
- Club: WOGA
- Head coach: Valeri Liukin
- Former coach: Natalia Marakova
- Choreographer: Antonia Marakova
Medal record
Women's gymnastics
Representing the United States
World Championships
| Silver medal – second place | 2009 London | All-Around |
| Silver medal – second place | 2010 Rotterdam | Team |
| Silver medal – second place | 2010 Rotterdam | Balance Beam |
| Bronze medal – third place | 2009 London | Uneven Bars |
| Bronze medal – third place | 2010 Rotterdam | All-Around |
| Bronze medal – third place | 2010 Rotterdam | Uneven Bars |
Pan American Games
| Gold medal – first place | 2007 Rio de Janeiro | Team |
| Gold medal – first place | 2007 Rio de Janeiro | Floor Exercise |
| Silver medal – second place | 2007 Rio de Janeiro | All-Around |
Pacific Rim Championships
| Gold medal – first place | 2008 San Jose | Team |
| Gold medal – first place | 2010 Melbourne | Team |
| Gold medal – first place | 2010 Melbourne | All-Around |
| Gold medal – first place | 2010 Melbourne | Balance Beam |
| Gold medal – first place | 2010 Melbourne | Floor Exercise |
| Silver medal – second place | 2010 Melbourne | Uneven Bars |
American Cup
| Gold medal – first place | 2010 Worcester | All-Around |

Rebecca Marie Bross (born July 11, 1993) is an American former artistic gymnast and six-time World Championship medalist.

== Personal life ==
Rebecca Marie Bross is the daughter of Terry Bross and Donna Bross. She has one older brother named Benjamin. She married Billy Burks December 17, 2022.

Her parents put her in a gymnastics class at the age of five. She was coached by Valeri Liukin at WOGA Gymnastics in Plano, Texas.

== Career ==
Bross first qualified to Junior International Elite in 2005, when she also qualified to her first U.S. Nationals. She placed 16th all-around and earned a spot on the national team. She then competed in a few international assignments over the next year. At the 2006 U.S. Nationals, Bross placed fourth all-around, which also qualified her to the Junior Pan American Championships team. In 2007, she was selected for the Pan American Games team. She finished second all-around behind teammate Shawn Johnson. At the 2007 U.S. Championships, Bross won her first national championships title despite a fall. She later won the Junior Japan Invitational.

Bross was able to compete in some Classics and Invitationals in early 2008. She competed with WOGA teammate Nastia Liukin at the Pacific Rim Championships, where she won gold medals in the all-around and on beam, bars and floor. She sat out the rest of the year because of a broken foot.

On July 25, 2009, at the Covergirl Classic in Des Moines, Iowa, Bross competed on the uneven bars, scoring a 13.150 (.050 better than her teammate Ivana Hong), but she was unable to compete on floor, beam or vault because of an ankle injury suffered during practice a few days earlier. She competed her bars routine without a dismount, thus lowering her overall score.

In August 2009, Bross finished third all-around behind Bridget Sloan (first) and Ivana Hong (second) at the U.S. National Championships. Bross also placed third on balance beam and second on floor to end a successful first senior Nationals.

The following October, at the World Championships in London, England, Bross qualified in first place into the all-around final. She also qualified second on uneven bars and eighth on floor exercise. She fell on her beam dismount in preliminaries, which prevented her from qualifying on that event. In the all-around final, Bross led the competition going into the final rotation by a sizeable margin, having received the top scores of the competition on both bars and beam. Needing only a 12.925 to clinch the gold, she fell on her final tumbling pass on floor and just missed that score (the judges awarded her a 12.875). Her teammate Bridget Sloan claimed the gold, while Bross took the silver. Bross tied Romania's Ana Porgras for the bronze medal in the uneven bars event final, as well as in the floor final, where they both placed fifth.

In March 2010, she won the all-around at the American Cup. Bross won every event with the exception of the vault, which was won by Aly Raisman. In April, she won the senior all-around title at the Pacific Rim Championships in Melbourne, Australia. At the 2010 Visa Championships, Bross finished Day 1 with a two-point lead. On Day 2, she finished with a three-point lead, clinching the event to become the 2010 national champion. She was selected for the women's team for the 2010 World Artistic Gymnastics Championships in Rotterdam, Netherlands. There, she helped the United States win a silver medal behind the newly dominant Russian team. In the all-around, after a fall on beam, she bounced back on floor to get the bronze medal, scoring a 15.233, which was the highest score given on floor to any women in the entire meet. Russia's Aliya Mustafina was the winner, and China's Jiang Yuyuan was the silver medalist. In event finals, Bross clinched the bronze on the uneven bars and tied with China's Deng Linlin for the silver on the balance beam behind Romania's Porgras.

During Night 2 of competition at the 2011 Visa Championships, Bross dislocated her right kneecap during a third-rotation vault. Because of the injury, Bross sat out of competition for the remainder of the 2011 season. Despite this, she earned a second-place finish on floor exercise, with a two-night total of 29.50. She also placed eighth on beam (27.6).

== 2012 Olympic Trials ==
In the summer of 2012, Bross competed in the Olympic trials in hopes of making the Olympic team for London. She competed on the beam and uneven bars, finishing in last place on both. Despite an excellent routine on the first night of competition, Bross fell three times off the bars on Night 2 and was instructed by her coach to stop mid-routine. As a result of her low scores, particularly on the uneven bars—an area in which National Team Coordinator Márta Károlyi stated that the women's team would need strong competitors—Bross did not make the main Olympic team, nor was she named as an alternate. Sports commentators speculated that Bross's defeat at the trials would likely be a career-ending one because of her previous injuries and age.

== Post-competitive career ==
Bross did not officially announce her retirement, but she did not train or compete after the Olympic trials in 2012. She is regarded by some gymnastics fans as "one of the most unfortunate and unluckiest gymnasts" because of the injuries she suffered. In the four-year period from 2008 to 2012, she incurred four injuries, including a broken foot, dislocated knee and other ankle and knee injuries that could have been serious.

In September 2013, Bross began coaching at Iarov Elite Gymnastics in Dallas, Texas. In 2022, Bross completed her studies at University of Texas Southwestern Medical Center to become a physical therapist.

== Routines ==
As of 2011, Bross performed the following skills on these apparatus:

| Apparatus | Skills | Difficulty | Top Score in World Championships, World Cup or Olympic Competition |
|---|---|---|---|
| Vault | Double twisting Yurchenko | 5.8 | 15.100 |
| Uneven Bars | Glide Kip Cast to Handstand (KCHS) (B) on low bar + toe-on to handstand 1/1 (D) + Van Leeuwen (toe-on circle to Shaposhnikova 1/2) (E); KCHS (B) + piked stalder 1/1 (E) + Tkatchev (D); KCHS (B) + piked stalder 1/2 (D) + Straddled Jaegar (D); KCHS (B) + stalder to handstand 1/1 (D) + Pak Salto (D); KCHS 1/2 (B) + toe-on shoot up to high bar; KCHS (B) + giant + giant + tucked full-in dismount (D) | 6.5 | 15.300 |
| Balance Beam | Jump on to beam; 1/1 turn in tuckstand (B); standing Arabian (F); front aerial (D) + flip flop (B) + back layout stepout (C); switch split leap (C) + back tuck (C); sheep jump (D); switch split ring leap (E); side somi (D); front tuck (D); roundoff + Arabian double front dismount (G) | 6.5 | 15.300 |
| Floor Exercise | Front handspring + front layout (B) + double front (E) + Stag jump (A); roundoff + back layout 3/2 (C) + front layout 2/1 (D) + Split Leap (A); switch ring leap (C) + switch leap 1/2 (C); 2/1 turn with leg at horizontal (D); split leap 3/2 (D); roundoff + back layout 5/2 (D) + front layout 1/1 (C) | 6.3 | 15.233 |

== Floor music ==
2011: "Beethoven Virus"

2010: "Dark Eyes"

2005-2009: "National Treasure Suite" from the National Treasure Soundtrack Jh

== Competitive history ==
| Year | Event | Team | AA | VT | UB | BB | FX |
Junior
| 2006 | Pacific Alliance Championships | 1st place, gold medalist(s) | 4 | | | 5 | |
| 2006 | Pan American Championships | 1st place, gold medalist(s) | 5 | 1st place, gold medalist(s) | | | |
| 2006 | U.S. Classic | | 6 | | | | |
| 2006 | Visa Championships | | 4 | 8 | 15 | 2nd place, silver medalist(s) | 20 |
2007
| 2007 | Pan American Games | 1st place, gold medalist(s) | 2nd place, silver medalist(s) | | | | 1st place, gold medalist(s) |
| 2007 | Visa Championships | | 1st place, gold medalist(s) | 1st place, gold medalist(s) | 1st place, gold medalist(s) | 2nd place, silver medalist(s) | 1st place, gold medalist(s) |
| 2007 | Junior Japan Int'l | | 1st place, gold medalist(s) | 1st place, gold medalist(s) | 1st place, gold medalist(s) | 1st place, gold medalist(s) | 1st place, gold medalist(s) |
| 2008 | ITA-ESP-POL-USA Friendly | 1st place, gold medalist(s) | 2nd place, silver medalist(s) | | | | |
| 2008 | Pacific Rim Championships | 1st place, gold medalist(s) | 1st place, gold medalist(s) | 1st place, gold medalist(s) | 8 | 1st place, gold medalist(s) | 1st place, gold medalist(s) |
Senior
| 2009 | U.S. Classic | | | | 10 | | |
| 2009 | Visa Championships | | 3rd place, bronze medalist(s) | | 6 | 3rd place, bronze medalist(s) | 2nd place, silver medalist(s) |
| 2009 | World Championships | | 2nd place, silver medalist(s) | | 3rd place, bronze medalist(s) | | 5 |
| 2010 | American Cup | | 1st place, gold medalist(s) | | | | |
| 2010 | Pacific Rim Championships | 1st place, gold medalist(s) | 1st place, gold medalist(s) | | 2nd place, silver medalist(s) | 1st place, gold medalist(s) | 1st place, gold medalist(s) |
| 2010 | U.S. Classic | | | | 1st place, gold medalist(s) | 6 | |
| 2010 | Visa Championships | | 1st place, gold medalist(s) | | 1st place, gold medalist(s) | 1st place, gold medalist(s) | 2nd place, silver medalist(s) |
| 2010 | World Championships | 2nd place, silver medalist(s) | 3rd place, bronze medalist(s) | | 3rd place, bronze medalist(s) | 2nd place, silver medalist(s) | |
| 2011 | Visa Championships | | | | | 8 | 2nd place, silver medalist(s) |
| 2012 | City of Jesolo Trophy | 1st place, gold medalist(s) | | | 9 | 8 | |
| 2012 | U.S. Classic | | | | 3rd place, bronze medalist(s) | 16 | |
| 2012 | U.S. National Championships | | | | 4 | 13 | |
| 2012 | Olympic Trials | | | | 13 | 14 | |
