= Kathy Gleason (gymnast) =

American gymnast (born 1949)

Personal information
- Born: March 8, 1949 (age 76); Buffalo, New York, United States

Sport
- Sport: Gymnastics

Kathy Gleason (born March 8, 1949) is an American gymnast. She competed in six events at the 1968 Summer Olympics.
