= Kristie Phillips =

American gymnast (born 1972)

- Born: March 23, 1972 (age 54) Baton Rouge, Louisiana, U.S.

Gymnastics career
- Country represented: United States
- College team: Louisiana State University
- Former coach: Béla Károlyi
Medal record
Representing United States
Gymnastics
Pan American Games
Gold medal – first place	1987 Indianapolis	Team
Gold medal – first place	1987 Indianapolis	Floor exercise
Silver medal – second place	1987 Indianapolis	All-around
Bronze medal – third place	1987 Indianapolis	Vault

Kristie Phillips-Bannister (born March 23, 1972), formerly known as Kristie Phillips, is a retired American elite gymnast. The 1987 senior U.S. National Champion and one of the American team's strongest and most visible competitors in the mid-1980s, Phillips was considered to be one of the front-runners for the 1988 U.S. Olympic team. By the Olympic Trials in 1988, however, she had endured several coaching changes and a growth spurt, and was only named second alternate to the team. She went on to participate in competitive cheerleading in college and has since enjoyed successful careers as an actress, stunt woman, coach and gymnastics club owner.

== Early life ==
Phillips was born in Baton Rouge, Louisiana. She began gymnastics in her home state at the age of 4. At 10, she was the children's all-around gold medalist at the Louisiana State Championships. As she excelled in the sport, she moved to the Atlanta School of Gymnastics, and to Houston, Texas to train with Béla Károlyi. She also trained at Parkettes in Allentown, Pennsylvania.

== Junior career ==
As a junior, Phillips was one of the United States' top-ranking athletes in both national and international competition. From 1985 to 1987, she placed first in the all-around in every single American competition she entered, including the 1986 American Classic, the 1986 U.S. Olympic Festival and the 1987 U.S. Classic. At her first U.S. National Championships in 1985, Phillips won the all-around title in the junior division; she repeated her success the following year, despite competing with a broken wrist.

Phillips made her debut in international competition at the age of 12, at the 1984 Canada Classic, where she won a silver medal on the floor exercise, a bronze on the uneven bars and placed seventh in the all-around. She continued to do well in international meets over the next three years, placing sixth at the prestigious 1986 City of Popes, winning a vault silver medal at the 1986 World Sports Fair and earning the all-around gold at the 1986 American Cup. Her signature move on balance beam, known as "the Phillips", was a reverse straddle planche. She called it the "butt on the head" move". Her beam mount also attracted attention.

By 1986, Phillips was considered to be one of the United States' best hopes for a medal at the 1988 Olympics in Seoul, and was the subject of a considerable amount of media attention. Her signature move, a reverse straddle planche on beam that was eventually named after her, was featured on the cover of the September 1, 1986 issue of Sports Illustrated. The caption beside her photo touted the 14 year old gymnast as "The New Mary Lou" (in reference to Mary Lou Retton). She was also interviewed for the 1987 ABC-TV documentary Olga, Nadia and Mary Lou.

== Senior career ==
As Phillips moved into the senior ranks in 1987, she appeared to be on track for the Seoul Olympics. Since December 1985 she had been training and competing with a navicular fracture of the wrist. Speaking about her injury, the fifteen year old Phillips said, "I knew if I was going to keep training, I'd have to work with some pain[...]Sometimes it's not so bad. Sometimes it's unbearable. But it's not that big of a deal anymore. I wear a brace." She won the 1987 national championships, but this was to be her only senior all-around title.

During the 1987 Pan Am Games Phillips fell off the balance beam, placing second behind Sabrina Mar in the all around competition. She also won a gold on the floor exercise, and a bronze medal in the vault.

She placed first all-around at the USA vs. USSR dual meet, and won her second American Cup. Phillips was also nominated for the 1987 James E. Sullivan Award.

However, Phillips' Olympic ambitions were derailed when she placed 45th all around at the 1987 World Championships. Marta Karolyi told USA Today in 1987 that Phillips "has had some problems with her weight, mostly because her heredity is not the best. Her mother is quite heavy". National team coach Greg Marsden speculated that Phillips may not have been well prepared for the Worlds: "Kristie was wholly not prepared. She wasn't physically prepared. I had calls from her mother complaining Bela was not preparing her and what could she do[...] at the world championships, I sat in a room with Kristie and she cried because she had given her heart and soul for two years, helped him maintain his reputation and media exposure and now he had abandoned her."

In 1988, Phillips returned to the Karolyis. She placed 9th at the U.S. Nationals that spring.

At the 1988 Olympic Trials, she moved up one place to 8th and was named as the second alternate to the U.S. Olympic team. She trained with the squad in America, but did not travel with them to Seoul. During the trials, she said: "Being told I'm a has-been forced my confidence to sink really fast [...] It's really hard to build that back up." She later said, "The reason I didn't make it was all politics," and that she thought it was wrong that the media had spoken of her as being overweight and constantly asked her how much she weighed when she was going through puberty. She also described eating very little food despite training 40 hours a week.

== After gymnastics ==
Phillips attended Louisiana State University from 1990 to 1992, where she was a competitive cheerleader and a Delta Gamma sister. After college, she moved to New York City, where she coached gymnastics and performed in various film and television projects, including 1994's Spitfire (a straight-to-video 007-spoof, which several fans have compared to Gymkata).

Throughout the mid-1990s, Phillips participated in the Reese's Cup, a televised elite gymnastics exhibition, where she continued to wow audiences with her unique brand of artistry. In 1999, she returned to the world of elite competitive gymnastics, placing 23rd at that year's U.S. National Championships. That year, Kristie was also named USA Gymnastics Sportswoman of the Year. She competed at the US Nationals again in 2000, placing 24th, before retiring.

Phillips lives in Troutman, North Carolina with her husband, photographer Horatio Bannister, and three children: Sebastian, Isabella and Eberlie. She owns KPAC, gymnastics facilities in Statesville and Mooresville, North Carolina, and is certified as an International Brevet judge. She was Athlete Representative for USA Gymnastics, and served in the same capacity for the 2008 U.S. Olympic gymnastics team selection committee. She has spoken about her experiences in gymnastics on several occasions, most recently in the 2003 CNN documentary Achieving the Perfect 10. She was inducted into the USA Gymnastics Hall of Fame in 2006.

== Eponymous skill ==
Phillips has one eponymous skill listed in the Code of Points.

Apparatus	Name	Description	Difficulty (Note: Valid for the 2025–2028 Code of Points)
Balance beam	Phillips	Press to side handstand - walkover forward to side stand on both legs	D (0.4)
