= Dorothy McClements =

American gymnast (born 1944)

- Full name: Dorothy Dale Elizabeth McClements-Kephart
- Born: December 31, 1944 (age 81) Winnipeg, Manitoba, Canada
- Height: 5 ft 0 in (152 cm)

Gymnastics career
- Discipline: Women's artistic gymnastics
- Country represented: United States
Medal record
Women's artistic gymnastics
Representing the United States
Pan American Games
Gold medal – first place	1963 São Paulo	Team all-around
Gold medal – first place	1963 São Paulo	Vault
Silver medal – second place	1963 São Paulo	Ind. all-around
Silver medal – second place	1963 São Paulo	Uneven Bars

Dorothy Dale Elizabeth McClements-Kephart (born December 31, 1944, in Winnipeg, Manitoba, Canada) was an American gymnast. She competed for the United States at the 1964 Summer Olympics in Tokyo.

== Gymnastics career ==
McClements-Kephart wrote articles for International Gymnastics Magazine and is an inductee to USA Gymnastics (Class of 1984. Disciplines(s): Women's Artistic. Inducted as: Athlete, Coach) and the University of Washington Halls of Fame.

== Personal life ==
She joined the Church of Jesus Christ of Latter-day Saints after competing in the 1964 Olympics.
