= Kathleen Corrigan =

American gymnast (1945–2025)

Personal information
- Full name: Kathleen Corrigan Ekas
- Born: March 3, 1945; Quincy, Massachusetts, U.S.
- Died: May 2, 2025 (aged 80); Norwell, Massachusetts, U.S.

Sport
- Sport: Gymnastics

Kathleen Corrigan (March 3, 1945 – May 2, 2025) was an American gymnast. She competed in six events at the 1964 Summer Olympics. She died in Norwell, Massachusetts on May 2, 2025, at the age of 80.
