= Kathy Howard =

American artistic gymnast

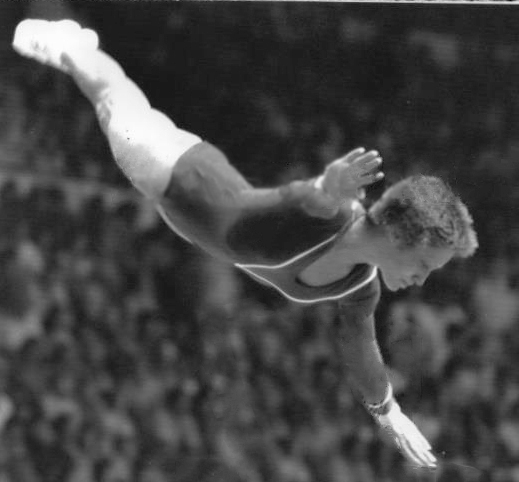
- Howard in 1976

Personal information
- Born: June 21, 1958 (age 68) Plainview, Texas, U.S.
- Height: 163 cm (5 ft 4 in)
- Weight: 50 kg (110 lb)

Sport
- Sport: Artistic gymnastics
- Club: Oklahoma City Gymnastics Center
Medal record
Representing United States
Pan American Games
Gold medal – first place	1975 Mexico City	Team
Silver medal – second place	1975 Mexico City	Floor

Kathy Howard (born June 21, 1958) is a retired American artistic gymnast. She won a team gold medal and a silver in floor at the 1975 Pan American Games. At the 1976 Summer Olympics she placed sixth with the team and shared 12th place in floor.
