= Joyce Tanac =

American gymnast

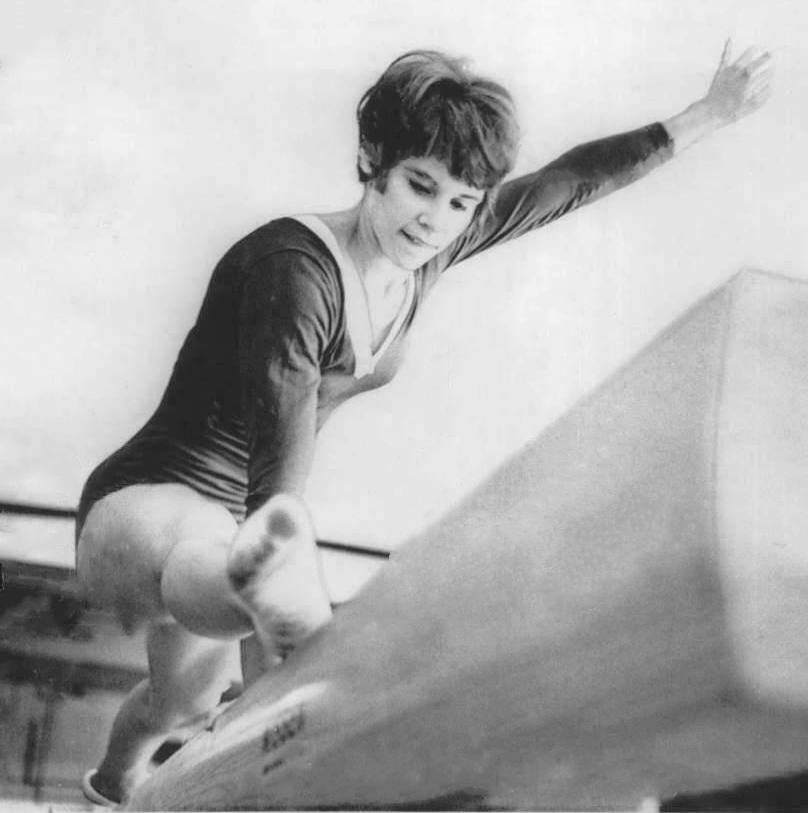
- Tanac in 1968

Personal information
- Born: September 27, 1950 (age 75) Seattle, Washington, U.S.
- Height: 156 cm (5 ft 1 in)
- Weight: 49 kg (108 lb)

Sport
- Sport: Gymnastics
- Club: Seattle Young Men's Christian Association
- Coached by: George Lewis; Frank Hailand
Medal record
Representing the United States
Pan American Games
Gold medal – first place	1967 Winnipeg	Team
Silver medal – second place	1967 Winnipeg	All-around
Silver medal – second place	1967 Winnipeg	Floor

Joyce Eileen Tanac (born September 27, 1950) is an American gymnast. She competed in six events at the 1968 Summer Olympics with the best individual result of 27th place on uneven bars and balance beam.

Tanac won the all-around, floor, beam, vault, and uneven bars events at the 1966 YMCA Championships and 1969 AAU Championships. Besides the Olympics she was part of the U.S. teams at the 1966 World Championships and 1967 Pan American Games. In 1969 she won a bronze medal all-around at the first Gymnastics World Cup. In 1972 she graduated from the University of Washington and later worked as a pharmacist. In 1990 she was inducted into the US Gymnastics Hall of Fame, and in 1998 into the University of Washington Athletic Hall of Fame. A gymnastics element, a dismount on even bars, is named after her.
