= Debra Willcox =

American gymnast

Personal information
- Born: September 16, 1959 (age 65); Denver, Colorado, United States

Sport
- Sport: Gymnastics

Debra Willcox (born September 16, 1959) is an American gymnast. She competed in six events at the 1976 Summer Olympics.
