= Teri Montefusco =

American gymnast (born 1941)

Personal information
- Nationality: American
- Born: June 18, 1941 (age 83); Peoria, Illinois, United States

Sport
- Sport: Gymnastics

Teri Montefusco (born June 18, 1941) is an American gymnast. She competed in six events at the 1960 Summer Olympics.
