= Chelle Stack =

American former gymnast

- Full name: Carol Michelle Stack
- Alternative name: Chelle
- Born: July 23, 1973 (age 53) Endicott, New York, U.S.

Gymnastics career
- Discipline: Women's artistic gymnastics
- Country represented: United States
Medal record
Pan American Games
Gold medal – first place	1991 Havana	Team
Gold medal – first place	1991 Havana	Floor exercise
Silver medal – second place	1991 Havana	All-around

Carol Michelle "Chelle" Stack (born July 23, 1973) is a former gymnast. She competed for the United States national team at the 1988 Seoul Summer Olympics. She is currently active as a brevet rated judge at US national gymnastics competitions.

== Career ==
=== Junior elite gymnastics ===
At the 1987 US Gymnastics Championships, Stack won silver in the junior all-around. Also in 1987, when Stack was fourteen, she competed at the Chunichi Cup in Japan. While practicing on the balance beam an hour before the competition, she fell and broke two of her toes. Coach Bela Karolyi yelled at Stack for this, telling her, "I have to single you out in the whole gymnastics world as the craziest person I've ever seen and the most uneducated." Karolyi still wanted Stack to compete, so she was treated with two shots of Novocain to dull the pain in her foot. She finished 16th in the Chunichi Cup all-around.

=== Senior elite gymnastics ===
Stack joined the senior national team in 1988. She competed at the 1988 American Cup, winning the floor exercise and finishing third in the vault, balance beam and all-around. She was fourth in the all-around, first on uneven bars and third in floor exercise at the 1988 US Gymnastics Championships. At the US Olympic Trials, she was fifth in the all-around. She placed fourth with the United States team at the 1988 Summer Olympics. At the 1988 Summer Olympics, Stack fell during her compulsory uneven bars routine so she did not compete in the finals. Seven out of eight of her routines counted for the team final score.

In 1989, Stack competed at the American Cup and was third in the all-around preliminaries. She was seventh in the all-around, first on uneven bars, and second in floor exercise at the 1989 US Gymnastics Championships. At the 1989 World Championships Team Trials, she was fourth in the all-around. That same year, she competed at the Gymnastics World Championships, placing fourth with the United States team and 28th individually in the all-around.

In 1990, Stack was 11th in the all-around and fourth on the balance beam at the US Gymnastics Championships. Internationally, she competed at Golden Sands in Bulgaria, winning silver medals in the all-around and balance beam.

In 1991, she competed at the American Cup, placing seventh in the all-around preliminaries. She competed at the 1991 Pan American Games, winning team gold, all-around silver and gold in the floor exercise. Stack was injured at the 1991 World Championships Team Trials.

In 1992, Stack competed at two national meets, the US Classic and the US Gymnastics Championships. She was ninth in the all-around at the US Classic and 29th in the all-around at the US Championships. After 1992, Stack was no longer on the US national team because she retired from elite gymnastics due to a broken knee.

During her elite gymnastics career, Stack trained with coaches Martha and Bela Karolyi at their gym, at SCATS Gymnastics and at Cypress Academy with coach Debbie Kaitschuck. While training with the Karolyis, Stack saw fellow Karolyi trainee Julissa Gomez perform the Yurchenko vault in practice. Stack said, "You could tell it was not a safe vault for her to be doing," and was quoted in Joan Ryan's book Little Girls in Pretty Boxes. In the same book, Chelle Stack's mother Carrol was also quoted, speaking about the verbal abuse she and Stack's coaches subjected Stack to during her career as an elite gymnast. When Stack retired from elite gymnastics, she had eighteen hairline fractures in her knee and her toes were deformed due to gymnastics.

=== Career after retirement from elite gymnastics ===
Stack attended the University of Oklahoma and competed on the gymnastics team there during the 1994 and 1995 seasons. She graduated from the University of Oklahoma in 1996 with degrees in Communications and Spanish. From 1998 until December 2001 or early 2002 Stack helped produce and performed in Cirque de Soleil's show "La Nouba." From 2002 until 2011, Stack owned her own gym in Winter Park, Florida and worked as a gymnastics coach. During this time, she became a gymnastics judge. She received her brevet judge rating in 2004. In 2011, Stack was inducted into the USA Gymnastics Hall of Fame. As of 2019, she is a member of the committee to Restore Integrity to the USOC, also known as Team Integrity.

== Personal life ==
In 2011, Stack was engaged to marry Robert Marcella. Her married name is Stack-Marcella.
