= Betty-Jean Maycock =

American gymnast

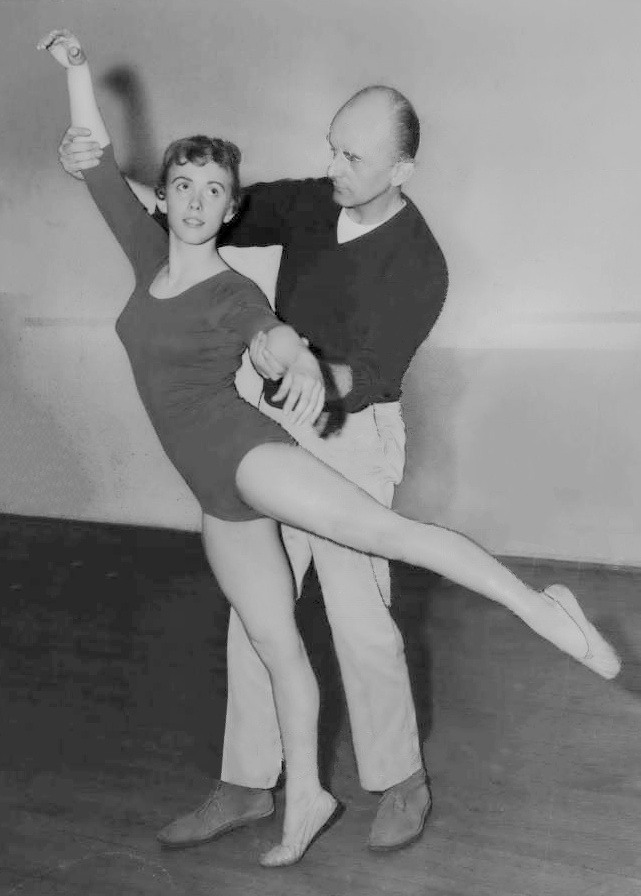
- Maycock in 1960

Personal information
- Born: December 13, 1942 (age 83) Cleveland, Ohio, U.S.
- Height: 157 cm (5 ft 2 in)
- Weight: 49 kg (108 lb)

Sport
- Sport: Artistic gymnastics
Medal record
Representing the United States
Pan American Games
Gold medal – first place	1959 Chicago	Team
Silver medal – second place	1959 Chicago	All-around
Silver medal – second place	1959 Chicago	Uneven bars
Silver medal – second place	1959 Chicago	Vault

Betty Jean Maycock Harrington (born December 13, 1942) is a former Olympic gymnast from Cleveland, Ohio. Maycock was a member of the American gymnastics team that placed ninth at the 1960 Summer Olympics. Prior to the Olympics, she was part of the first collegiate women's gymnastics team in the United States at Kent State University in 1959 while still a student at Kent State High School. She also won four medals at the 1959 Pan American Games. Following the Olympics, she returned to college, graduating cum laude from Kent State in 1964, and later earned a Ph.D. in Child Development from the University of Maryland. She was married to Robert Sutton Harrington (1942–1993) in 1976, and has two daughters, Amy and Ann. She currently works with the organization Microcredit in Africa, which implements microcredit projects in Niger.
