= Monica Goermann =

Canadian gymnast (born 1964)

Personal information
- Born: 1 September 1964 (age 62) Winnipeg, Manitoba, Canada
Medal record
Gymnastics
Commonwealth Games
Gold medal – first place	1978 Edmonton	Team
Pan American Games
Gold medal – first place	1979 San Juan	All-Around
Gold medal – first place	1979 San Juan	Team
Gold medal – first place	1979 San Juan	Uneven Bars
Silver medal – second place	1979 San Juan	Floor Exercise
Bronze medal – third place	1979 San Juan	Balance Beam

Monica Goermann (born September 1, 1964) is a Canadian former gymnast and gymnastics coach. She is also the owner, artistic director, and choreographer of Monica's Danz Gym. She was named to the 1980 Canadian Olympic team, although the team did not compete due to Canada's decision to boycott the Olympics in Moscow.

== Personal life ==
Goermann was born on September 1, 1964, in Winnipeg, Manitoba, where she attended Dakota Collegiate. Her parents Elfriede and Wolfgang Goermann were gymnastics coaches who went on to found the Winnipeg Gymnastics Center in 1997.

Goermann has a daughter who is also a competitive gymnast.

== Career ==
Goermann was a member of the Canadian National Gymnastics Team from 1977 to 1983, and competed all over the world, including Japan and Russia. Her signature grace and artistic flair were widely known at the time. She became a five-time medalist at the Pan American Games during this period. Goermann also won the all around title at the Pan American Games in 1979. In 1991, Goermann was inducted into the Manitoba Sports Hall of Fame.

Monica's Danz Gym was established in 1993 after her successful career as a coach and choreographer for the Guatemalan National Gymnastics Team.
