= Kolleen Shields =

American gymnast

- Full name: Kolleen Casey Shields
- Born: 1959 (age 66–67) Saint Paul, Minnesota

Gymnastics career
- Discipline: Women's artistic gymnastics
- Country represented: United States

Kolleen Casey Shields (born 1959) was a gymnast who competed for the United States in the 1976 Montreal Olympics. She finished 23rd in the vault, an event won by Nadia Comăneci. She was the 1975 U.S. national champion in vault. Shields competed for Southwest Missouri State University from 1977 to 1979, where she won the Honda Sports Award as the nation's top female gymnast in 1979. She transferred to the University of Minnesota, graduating with a degree in Physical Therapy. Shields became a physical therapist at the University of Iowa.
