= Ann Carr (gymnast) =

American gymnast

- Full name: Ann Carr-Tunney

Gymnastics career
- Country represented: United States
- College team: Penn State (1977–80)
- Gym: Lakettes Gymnastics Academy

Ann Carr, also known as Ann Carr-Tunney, is an American gymnast. She was a U.S. National Team member at the 1974 World Gymnastics Championships, as well as at the 1975 Pan American Games where she earned gold medals in the team competition, all-around, uneven bars, balance beam and floor exercise, and several other international competitions. She was the first woman to receive a full athletic scholarship from Penn State University, where she competed from 1977 through 1980. She led her gymnastics team at Penn State to first place in 1978 and 1980, and finished first individually in the all-around, balance beam, floor and uneven bars in 1978, and second in the all-around in 1980. She received the Broderick Award (awarded to the nation’s most outstanding collegiate gymnast and now known as the Honda Sports Award), the Pennsylvania Sports Hall of Fame Meritorious Achievement Award (in 1978 and 1980), and Penn State University’s Eric A. Walker Award (given to the senior whose achievements have enhanced the public esteemed renown of the university). She later served as the owner, manager, and coach of the Lakettes Gymnastics Academy in Erie, Pennsylvania, from 1981 through 1985.

In 1979, the Supersisters trading card set was produced and distributed; one of the cards featured Carr's name and picture.

She was inducted into the U.S. Gymnastics Hall of Fame in 2001.
