= Ernestine Russell =

Canadian gymnast (1938–2026)

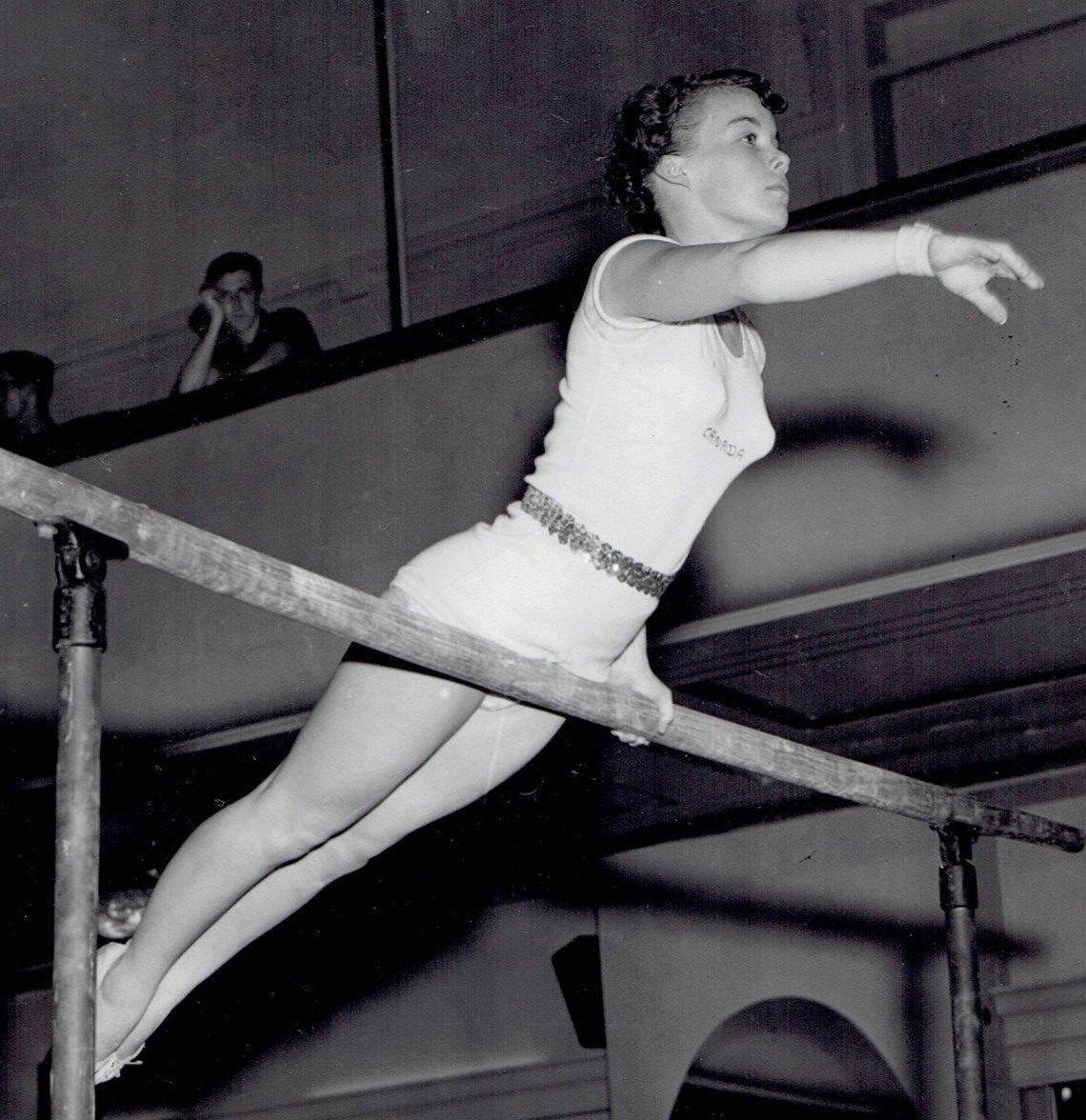
- Russell at the 1954 AAU Championships

Personal information
- Born: June 10, 1938 Windsor, Ontario, Canada
- Died: January 14, 2026 (aged 87)
- Height: 153 cm (5 ft 0 in)
- Weight: 52 kg (115 lb)

Sport
- Sport: Artistic gymnastics
Medal record
Representing Canada
Pan American Games
Gold medal – first place	1959 Chicago	All-around
Gold medal – first place	1959 Chicago	Vault
Gold medal – first place	1959 Chicago	Uneven bars
Gold medal – first place	1959 Chicago	Floor
Silver medal – second place	1959 Chicago	Balance beam

Ernestine Jean Russell (June 10, 1938 – January 14, 2026), later known by her married names Ernestine Carter and Ernestine Weaver, was a Canadian gymnast and American college gymnastics coach. She represented Canada in the 1956 and 1960 Summer Olympics. Although Russell won no medals in her two Olympic appearances, she is regarded as Canada's first notable female Olympic gymnast and contributed significantly to the growing popularity of women's gymnastics in Canada and the United States.

Russell later became a college gymnastics coach, leading the women's programs at Clarion State College and the University of Florida, where her teams won three college national championships.

== Early years ==
Ernestine Russell was born and raised in Windsor, Ontario. She learned ballet early on from her mother who taught dance training as an instructor at the British Royal Academy. As her training progressed, it became apparent that she lacked the body to become a ballerina.

Bernie Newman, the Russell family's neighbour and a future member of the provincial parliament, had formed a vocational boys' gymnastics team, and suggested to Russell that she try the trampoline. She was quoted as saying "I got on, and I never got off."

Russell would compete for the first time when she was 13 years old, and won nine Canadian championships. Newman would be a leading force that would encourage her throughout the years, hoping that he would one day see her in the Olympic Games.

== International gymnastics career ==
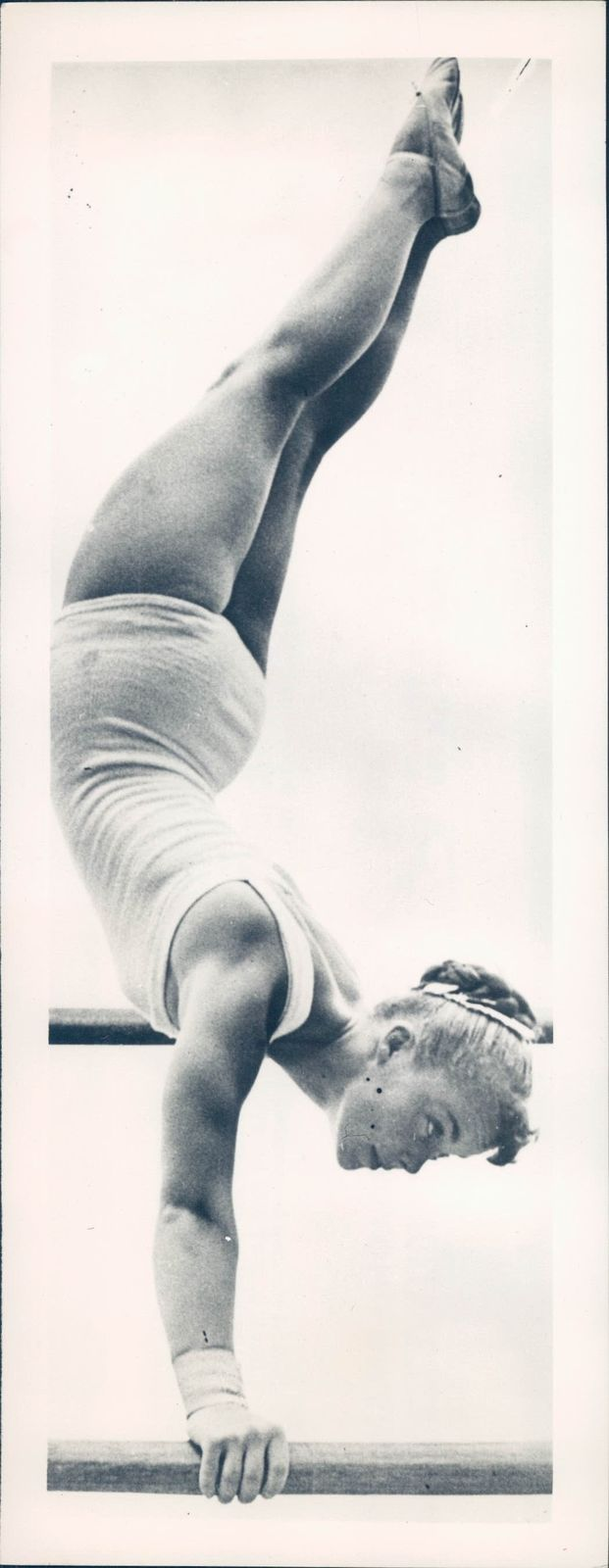
Ernestine Russell 1956

Russell, at age 17, qualified for the 1956 Summer Olympics in Melbourne, Australia. She was the first Canadian to compete in Olympic gymnastics events since 1908, and the first Canadian woman to ever compete in the Olympics. Although her routine was ill-prepared, she performed well in the floor exercise, the balance beam and the vault. She finished among the top twenty in the floor exercise, 45th in the vault, 56th in the all-around, and 61st in the balance beam and uneven bars.

After she graduated from Kennedy Collegiate Institute in 1956, she continued to pursue her focus in gymnastics.

At the 1959 Pan American Games in Chicago, Russell won gold medals for all-around, vault, uneven bars, and floor exercise, and a silver in balance beam, which made her the first Canadian medal winner in an international gymnastics competition. The Canadian team finished second behind the U.S. team.

At age 21, she qualified to participate in the 1960 Summer Olympics in Rome. While receiving significant media coverage, she did not match her 1956 Olympic performance.

== College education ==
Russell received a tuition-only scholarship offer from Michigan State University, and the opportunity to train with the Michigan State Spartans men's gymnastics team under head coach George Szypula. Russell married John Carter, a Michigan State Spartans baseball player in December 1959. In addition to being coached by Szypula, she had access to one of the best athletic physical plants in the United States. During her time as a Michigan State undergraduate, she also performed at a half-dozen gymnastics exhibitions on campus. Following the 1960 Olympics, she completed her bachelor's degree in physical education and dance from Michigan State, and then taught high school for five years.

== College coaching career ==
After teaching high school and coaching a cheerleading team for five years, Michigan State athletic director Biggie Munn invited Russell to become the head coach of the Michigan State women's gymnastics club team. In 1969, she became the women's gymnastics head coach at Clarion State College. Over the next decade, her Clarion State Golden Eagles teams compiled a perfect dual meet win–loss record of 58–0 in ten seasons and won Association for Intercollegiate Athletics for Women (AIAW) college national championships in 1977 and 1978.

Russell then accepted an offer to become the head gymnastics coach for at the University of Florida, where she made a large impact upon joining the Florida Gators women's gymnastics team. With her as their head coach, the Gators won one AIAW national championship in 1982, and subsequently qualified for eleven consecutive NCAA national championship tournament appearances from 1982 to 1992. The Gators earned a total of 35 All-America honours and claimed three national event titles. Russell was named national coach of the year in 1982, when Florida won the AIAW gymnastics championship. Her Florida Gators teams also won five Southeastern Conference (SEC) championships, and she was named SEC Coach of the Year in 1989 and 1992. Her Florida Gators gymnasts compiled an overall win–loss record of 185–48; her 23-year career record as a head coach was 243–48. Russell's program marketing and event showmanship contributed greatly to the development and popularity of the Gator gymnastics program, and it was studied and emulated by other programs.

She was inducted into the University of Florida Athletic Hall of Fame as an "Honorary Letterwinner" in 2013.

== Death ==
Russell died on January 14, 2026, at the age of 87.

== Olympic results ==
Games	Age	City	Sport	Event	Team	Finish
1956	18	Melbourne	Gymnastics	Women's Floor Exercise	Canada	20T
1956	18	Melbourne	Gymnastics	Women's Horse Vault	Canada	45
1956	18	Melbourne	Gymnastics	Women's Uneven Bars	Canada	61
1956	18	Melbourne	Gymnastics	Women's Balance Beam	Canada	61
1956	18	Melbourne	Gymnastics	Women's Individual All-Around	Canada	56
1960	21	Rome	Gymnastics	Women's Floor Exercise	Canada	86 QR
1960	21	Rome	Gymnastics	Women's Horse Vault	Canada	75 QR
1960	21	Rome	Gymnastics	Women's Uneven Bars	Canada	76 QR
1960	21	Rome	Gymnastics	Women's Balance Beam	Canada	68 T QR
1960	21	Rome	Gymnastics	Women's Individual All-Around	Canada	76

Women's Floor Exercise
Games	Age	City	Sport	Country	Phase	Unit Finish	Points
1956	18	Melbourne	Gymnastics	Canada	Final Standing	20T	18.200
1960	21	Rome	Gymnastics	Canada	Final Standing	86QR	
1960	21	Rome	Gymnastics	Canada	Qualifying	86	17.433

Women's Horse Vault
Games	Age	City	Sport	Country	Phase	Unit Finish	Points
1956	18	Melbourne	Gymnastics	Canada	Final Standing	45	17.833
1960	21	Rome	Gymnastics	Canada	Final Standing	75 QR	
1960	21	Rome	Gymnastics	Canada	Qualifying	75	17.00

Women's Uneven Bars
Games	Age	City	Sport	Country	Phase	Unit Finish	Points
1956	18	Melbourne	Gymnastics	Canada	Final Standing	61	16.133
1960	21	Rome	Gymnastics	Canada	Final Standing	76 QR	
1960	21	Rome	Gymnastics	Canada	Qualifying	76	17.466

Women's Balance Beam
Games	Age	City	Sport	Country	Phase	Unit Finish	Points
1956	18	Melbourne	Gymnastics	Canada	Final Standing	61	15.766
1960	21	Rome	Gymnastics	Canada	Final Standing	68T QR	
1960	21	Rome	Gymnastics	Canada	Qualifying	68T	17.033

Women's Individual All-Around
Games	Age	City	Sport	Country	Phase	Unit Finish	Points
1956	18	Melbourne	Gymnastics	Canada	Final Standing	56	67.933
1960	21	Rome	Gymnastics	Canada	Final Standing	76	68.932

Source: Sports-Reference.com

== See also ==
- Canadian Olympic Hall of Fame
- University of Florida Athletic Hall of Fame
- List of Olympic female gymnasts for Canada
- List of University of Florida Athletic Hall of Fame members
