= Roxanne Pierce =

American gymnast

Personal information
- Nationality: American
- Born: October 14, 1954 (age 70); Springfield, New Jersey, United States

Sport
- Sport: Gymnastics

Roxanne Pierce (born October 14, 1954) is an American gymnast. She competed in six events at the 1972 Summer Olympics.

== Competitive history ==
Year	Event	Team	AA	VT	UB	BB	FX
1970	AAU Championships		5	2nd place, silver medalist(s)	3rd place, bronze medalist(s)		3rd place, bronze medalist(s)
1970	USGF Championships		4				
1971	AAU Championships		2nd place, silver medalist(s)				
1971	Chunichi Cup		9				
1971	Pan American Games	1st place, gold medalist(s)	1st place, gold medalist(s)	1st place, gold medalist(s)	1st place, gold medalist(s)	3rd place, bronze medalist(s)	3rd place, bronze medalist(s)
1971	Riga International			5			
1971	USA-USSR Dual Meet	2nd place, silver medalist(s)	9				
1971	U.S. Championships		4				
1972	Scarborough Winstonettes Invitational		1st place, gold medalist(s)	1st place, gold medalist(s)	1st place, gold medalist(s)	2nd place, silver medalist(s)	2nd place, silver medalist(s)
1972	USA-JPN Dual Meet			1st place, gold medalist(s)	2nd place, silver medalist(s)		
1972	USGF Championships			2nd place, silver medalist(s)	2nd place, silver medalist(s)		
1972	Olympic Games	4	33				
1973	AAU Championships		2nd place, silver medalist(s)	1st place, gold medalist(s)	1st place, gold medalist(s)		2nd place, silver medalist(s)
1973	HUN-USA Dual Meet		4				
1973	Riga International		6				
1973	USA-ROM Dual Meet		8				
1973	USGF Elite Championships		2nd place, silver medalist(s)	1st place, gold medalist(s)	1st place, gold medalist(s)	5	3rd place, bronze medalist(s)
1974	AAU Championships		4		2nd place, silver medalist(s)		
1974	Elite Qualification Meet		2nd place, silver medalist(s)				
1974	U.S. World Trials		8				
1974	USGF Elite Championships		5	2nd place, silver medalist(s)	3rd place, bronze medalist(s)		
1975	AAU Championships		1st place, gold medalist(s)		2nd place, silver medalist(s)	1st place, gold medalist(s)	
1975	Elite Qualification Meet		2nd place, silver medalist(s)				
1975	Mardi Gras Invitational		4				
1975	USGF Elite Championships		5			6	
1975	Pan American Trials		6				
1975	Pan American Games	1st place, gold medalist(s)	2nd place, silver medalist(s)	3rd place, bronze medalist(s)	1st place, gold medalist(s)		3rd place, bronze medalist(s)
1976	AAU Championships		1st place, gold medalist(s)				
1976	AIAW Nationals		3rd place, bronze medalist(s)		5	2nd place, silver medalist(s)	1st place, gold medalist(s)
1976	USA-CAN Dual Meet		8				
1976	U.S. Championships		22				
1976	U.S. Olympic Trials		25				
