= Sabrina Mar =

American gymnast

Sabrina Mar (born 1969 or 1970) is an American gymnast. She was the 1985 U.S. national all-around champion. She was inducted into the USA Gymnastics Hall of Fame in 2004.

== Early life ==
Mar's parents emigrated to the United States from China after World War II. Sabrina Mar was named for Audrey Hepburn's character in Sabrina. Mar grew up in Monterey Park, California. She started ballet at an early age where one of her instructors noticed her talent for tumbling and suggested putting her in gymnastics.

== Education ==
In 1993, Mar earned a degree from UCLA.

== Gymnastics career ==
As a junior, Mar finished second at U.S. nationals twice. Mar trained at Southern California Acro Team (SCATS), a non-profit gym which produced several champion gymnasts, including Cathy Rigby. At SCATS, Mar was coached by Mary Wright and Steve Gerlach.

Mar won the all-around title at the 1985 USA Gymnastics National Championships. At that meet she also won gold on floor exercise and uneven bars and silver on balance beam and vault. She suffered from back pain in 1986 and only managed an 11th-place finish at the 1986 National Champships. Mar recovered from an ankle injury in 1987 to place third at the National Championships that year. Mar won the all-around title at the 1987 Pan American Games where she also won team gold. Mar was part of the U.S. gymnastics team for the 1987 World Championships. The team finished a disappointing sixth, with Mar being the only team member to qualify for an individual event final.

Mar pulled out of the 1988 USA Gymnastics National Championships with a back injury. Mar had long suffered from spondylolisthesis, a slippage of disks in the back. Mar was given an waiver to compete in the national trials, however the injury prevented her from competing. She retired from gymnastics when she pulled out of the trials. Mar was inducted into the USA Gymnastics Hall of Fame in 2004.

=== Allegations against USA Gymnastics ===
Mar is one of several former USA gymnasts who has alleged former coach Doug Boger mistreated young gymnasts. According to Mar, Boger would pin gymnasts against the wall and "basically just choke you." USA Gymnastics placed Boger on its list of ineligible coaches in 2010.

== Post-gymnastics career ==
Mar was a dancer in Annie (1982). She then became an animator on the television show South Park.

== Personal life ==
Mar's husband is Dennis. They have one son and a daughter.
