= 1938 World Artistic Gymnastics Championships =

Gymnastics competition

- Location: Prague, Czechoslovakia

The 11th Artistic Gymnastics World Championships were held in Prague, Czechoslovakia, in 1938.

According to the website Gymnastics-History.com, various original source materials stated that the political situation, with what would become World War II on the near horizon, was grave in Czechoslovakia. An article in the 28 May 1938 edition of The New York Times described the political situation in Czechoslovakia as a “powder barrel” about which Soviet spokespersons “continued to evince concern all week over the possibilities of a general war blazing up from the Czechoslovakia situation Also, the Yorkshire Post and Leeds Intelligencer stated, in an article in their 6 July 1938 edition, “In the midst of the gravest crisis experienced since the foundation of Czechoslovakia, Prague is celebrating the tenth Congress of the Slavonic Gymnastic Movement called the Sokol, or Falcon”. It was due to this political context that the 1938 World Championships were under-attended. A Sokol publication stated

“Only one thing they were not that happy about. The Hungarians, who were an excellent team in Budapest and Berlin, and the Germans, who were 0.5% ahead of our team in Berlin, did not have their strong competitors here. Both teams were registered for the competition and withdrew only at the last minute. The Dutch team apologized on the eve of the competition and did not participate.”

== Medals ==
Rank	Nation	Gold	Silver	Bronze	Total
1	Czechoslovakia (TCH)	11	6	2	19
2	Switzerland (SUI)	4	4	4	12
3	Yugoslavia (YUG)	0	1	2	3
4	Poland (POL)	0	0	1	1
Totals (4 entries)		15	11	9	35

== Men ==
=== Team final ===
Medal	Country	Points
Gold medal	Czechoslovakia; Jan Gajdoš, Gustav Hrubý, Alois Hudec, Emanuel Löffler, Vratislav Petráček, Jan Sládek, Jindřich Tintěra	806.800
Silver medal	Switzerland; Albert Bachmann, Walter Beck, Eugen Mack, Hans Negelin, Michael Reusch, Leo Schürmann, ?? Smid	791.833
Bronze medal	Yugoslavia; Miroslav Forte, Boris Gregorka, Josip Kujundžić, Janez Pristov, Josip Primožič, Miloš Skrbinšek, Jože Vadnov	741.300
4	France	740.133
5	Poland	681.233
6	Luxembourg	626.033
7	Belgium	558.400
8	Bulgaria	518.933

=== All-around ===
A total of 59 competitors were individually ranked in the all-around competition.

Medal	Country	Gymnast	Score
Gold medal	Czechoslovakia	Jan Gajdoš	138.06
Silver medal	Czechoslovakia	Jan Sládek	137.466
Bronze medal	Switzerland	Eugen Mack	136.40
4	Czechoslovakia	Alois Hudec	136.333
5	Switzerland	Leo Schürmann	134.533
6	Czechoslovakia	Gustav Hrubý	133.833
7	Switzerland	Walter Beck	132.60
8	Switzerland	Hans Negelin	131.366
9	Czechoslovakia	Emanuel Löffler	131.333
10	Czechoslovakia	Vratislav Petráček	129.833
11	Switzerland	Guglielmo Schmid	128.766
12	France	Lucien Masset	128.633
13	Switzerland	Albert Bachmann	127.533
14	Yugoslavia	Josip Vadnav	127.3
15	Yugoslavia	Janez Pristov	127.266
16	France	Armand Walter	126.6
17	France	Maurice Benhaim	125.266
18	France	Gaston Murray	124.666
19	Yugoslavia	Josip Primožič	124.633
20	Czechoslovakia	Jindřich Tintěra	124.133
21	Poland	Edmund Kosman	124.1
22 (tie)	Yugoslavia	Boris Gregorka	123.766
22 (tie)	Luxembourg	Jey Kugeler	123.766
24	Switzerland	Michael Reusch	121.00
25	Poland	Wiencenty Pietrzykowski	120.833
26	Yugoslavia	Josip Kujundžić	119.366
27	Switzerland	Siegbert Bader	119.333
28	France	Louis Riollet	119.166
29	Yugoslavia	Miroslav Forte	118.9
30	Czechoslovakia	Josef Novotný	116.3
31	Yugoslavia	Stjepan Boltižar	116.033
32	France	Paul Cacheux	115.5
33	France	Armand Solbach	115.1
34	Luxembourg	Mathias Logelin	114.566
35	Yugoslavia	Miloš Skrbinšek	111.866
36	Poland	Wilhelm Breguła	110.666
37	Bulgaria	Nino Mirtchev	110.366
38	France	André Weingand	109.366
39	Poland	Tadeusz Bettyna	109.066
40	Luxembourg	Jos Romersa	108.366
41	Poland	Paweł Gaca	108.333
42	Poland	Bernard Radajewski	108.233
43	Belgium	Arther Defer	104.1
44	Belgium	Hri Boddaert, Jr.	103.466
45	Luxembourg	Georges Wengler	99.9
46	Belgium	Adolf Bickert	99.433
47	Poland	Wilhelm Szlosarek	99.133
48	Bulgaria	Kosta Ignatov	96.033
49	Poland	Maksymilian Pradela	95.966
50	Belgium	Joseph Foulon	93.933
51	Luxembourg	Franz Haupert	90.566
52	Luxembourg	Willy Klein	88.9
53	Bulgaria	Ivan Tchouresky	86.133
54	Belgium	Albert Maest	83.166
55	Bulgaria	Metodi Christov	78.966
56	Bulgaria	Josif Christov	74.833
57	Belgium	Stan. Stobbaert	74.4
58	Bulgaria	Ivan Siarov	72.6
59	Luxembourg	Robert Weiwers	66.833

=== Floor exercise ===
Medal	Country	Gymnast	Score
Gold medal	Czechoslovakia	Jan Gajdoš	18.83
Silver medal	Czechoslovakia	Alois Hudec†	18.56
Silver medal	Switzerland	Eugen Mack†	18.56
4	Switzerland	Michael Reusch	18.36
5 (tie)	Czechoslovakia	Vratislav Petráček	18.26
5 (tie)	France	Maurice Benhaim	18.26
5 (tie)	Switzerland	Leo Schürmann	18.26
8	France	Lucien Masset	18.23
9	Czechoslovakia	Emanuel Löffler	18.06
10	Switzerland	Walter Beck	18.00

† = Although on page 65 of the FIG’s 125-Year Anniversary Publication, Hudec and Mack are listed as having won silver and bronze, respectively, on the Floor Exercise, two different contemporaneous reports of these World Championships show Hudec and Mack as having tied for silver, each with "18.56" or "18.5 & 2/3" points.

=== Pommel horse ===
Medal	Country	Gymnast	Score
Gold medal	Switzerland	Michael Reusch	19.56
Silver medal	Czechoslovakia	Vratislav Petráček	19.46
Bronze medal	Switzerland	Leo Schürmann	19.40
4	Czechoslovakia	Jan Gajdoš	19.16
5	Czechoslovakia	Jan Sládek	19.06
6	Switzerland	Eugen Mack	18.90
7	Switzerland	Albert Bachmann	18.76
8	Switzerland	Guglielmo Schmid	18.46
9	Czechoslovakia	Alois Hudec	18.30
10	Czechoslovakia	Jindřich Tintěra	18.23

=== Rings ===
Medal	Country	Gymnast	Score
Gold medal	Czechoslovakia	Alois Hudec	19.63
Silver medal	Switzerland	Michael Reusch	19.30
Bronze medal	Czechoslovakia	Vratislav Petráček	18.76
4	Czechoslovakia	Emanuel Löffler	18.43
5	Poland	Edmund Kosman	18.33
6	Switzerland	Eugen Mack	18.30
7 (tie)	Czechoslovakia	Jan Gajdoš	18.26
7 (tie)	Yugoslavia	Miloš Skrbinšek	18.26
7 (tie)	Czechoslovakia	Jindřich Tintěra	18.26
10	Yugoslavia	Miroslav Forte	17.90

=== Vault ===
Medal	Country	Gymnast	Score
Gold medal	Switzerland	Eugen Mack	19.83
Silver medal	Switzerland	Walter Beck	19.66
Bronze medal	Switzerland	Hans Nagelin	19.50
4	Czechoslovakia	Gustav Hrubý	19.36
5	France	Armand Walter	19.16
6	Switzerland	Leo Schürmann	19.06
7	Luxembourg	Jey Kugeler	18.96
8	Switzerland	Albert Bachmann	18.93
9 (tie)	Czechoslovakia	Alois Hudec	18.90
9 (tie)	Yugoslavia	Jože Vadnov	18.90

=== Parallel bars ===
Medal	Country	Gymnast	Score
Gold medal	Switzerland	Michael Reusch	19.56
Silver medal	Czechoslovakia	Alois Hudec	19.53
Bronze medal	Yugoslavia	Josip Primožič	18.73
4	Switzerland	Eugen Mack	18.66
5	Switzerland	Hans Nagelin	18.46
6	Czechoslovakia	Jan Gajdoš	18.33
7	France	Lucien Masset	18.16
8	Switzerland	Guglielmo Schmid	18.13
9 (tie)	Switzerland	Walter Beck	18.10
9 (tie)	Switzerland	Leo Schürmann	18.10

=== Horizontal bar ===
Medal	Country	Gymnast	Score
Gold medal	Switzerland	Michael Reusch	19.76
Silver medal	Czechoslovakia	Alois Hudec	19.70
Bronze medal	Switzerland	Walter Beck	19.63
4	Switzerland	Eugen Mack	19.33
5	Yugoslavia	Josip Primožič	19.30
6	Switzerland	Leo Schürmann	19.16
7	France	Armand Walter	19.06
8 (tie)	Czechoslovakia	Jan Gajdoš	19.03
8 (tie)	Yugoslavia	Josip Kujundžić	19.03
10	Czechoslovakia	Jan Sládek	18.86

=== Track and Field and Athletics component ===
According to the official commemorative publication for the 10th Prague Sokol Slet in 1938, of which these World Championships were a feature, as well as to an article on Gymnastics-History.com, there was a Track and Field and Athletics component to the competition, as there had been in some previous World Championships and Olympic Games. In this edition of the World Championships, the track and field and athletics segment of the competition included 100 meter, High jump, and Shot put events. According to information given in this 10th Sokol Slet publication, the maximum possible individual all-around total was 150 points, of which the track and field and athletics component contributed a total of 30 points, with a maximum of 10 points each being awarded for the 100 meter, High Jump, and Shot Put events.

Although there is no mention of there having been awarded medals solely for placements earned in the track and field segment of the competition, the ten highest-placing individuals in the Track and Field segment of the competition were:

Placement	Country	Gymnast	Score
1	Poland	Wiencenty Pietrzykowski	29.6
2	Czechoslovakia	Gustav Hrubý	28.7
3	Czechoslovakia	Jan Sládek	28.4
4	France	Maurice Benhaim	26.6
5	Poland	Edmund Kosman	26.2
6	Czechoslovakia	Jan Gajdoš	26.1
7 (tie)	Poland	Bernard Radajewski	25.8
7 (tie)	Switzerland	Leo Schürmann	25.8
9	Yugoslavia	Janez Pristov	25.5
10	Yugoslavia	Boris Gregorka	25.5

=== Gymnastics apparatuses only ===
The 1938 Sokol Slet commemorative publication also specifically articulates that, minus the track and field events, among the highest individual placers of the gymnastics-apparatus-only segment of the competition (120 of the 150 total points), the top 3 places were earned by:

1. Alois Hudec of Czechoslovakia, with 114.633 points
2. Eugen Mack of Switzerland, with 113.6 points
3. Michael Reusch of Switzerland, with 112.266 points

with Gajdoš, Petráček and Beck rounding out the top 6, in that order.

Under all World Championships and Olympic Games editions of artistic gymnastics competition since World War II, there is no longer a track and field or athletics component to the competition. In view of these currently prevailing standards, in "pure gymnastics" terms, people could argue that Alois Hudec could be considered one of the sport’s repeat World All-Around Champions, who are rare compared to single-time winners.

== Women ==
=== Team final ===
Medal	Country	Points
Gold medal	Czechoslovakia; Vlasta Děkanová, Božena Dobešová, Marie Hendrychová, Anna Nezerpová, Matylda Pálfyová, Marie Skálová, Zdeňka Veřmiřovská	552.76
Silver medal	Yugoslavia; Ančka Hafner, Ema Kovačić, Marta Podpac, Marta Pustišek, Dušica Radivojević, Lidija Rupnik, Milena Sket, Jelica Vazzaz	513.96
Bronze medal	Poland	510.21
4	Bulgaria	286.34

=== All-around ===
A total of 32 woman gymnasts were individually ranked for the all-around competition. With the context of both the previous World Championships which were the first with a women's segment to the competition as well as the interceding Olympic Games, the outcome and composition of the women's all-around podium at these championships was significant. Reportedly, cheating occurred at the first 1934 women's installment of these games which, when undone, allowed the Czechoslovak team and their foremost star Vlasta Děkanová to be the first-place finishers, as a team and individual, respectively. Going into the 1936 Olympics, the Czechoslovaks and Děkanová were the favorites, but had to take 2nd place behind the home-ground advantaged German team (who did not compete at the 1934 Worlds), and the top three scoring individuals were all German. These 1938 Worlds were hosted in Prague, Czechoslovakia, and this time all three spots on the all-around podium were occupied by individuals from the Czechoslovak team. Děkanová (a Czech) successfully defended her first-place finish from the previous worlds, Zdeňka Veřmiřovská (a Moravian) won silver, and Matylda Pálfyová (a Slovak) won bronze. The three regions from which each hailed within the former Czechoslovakia were the 3 largest and most significant regions of that nation, so the fullest representation possible of geographical diversity within that country was made manifest on this all-around podium.

Rank	Nation	Gymnast	Gymnastics Events						Athletics Events			Individual Grand Totals
Rank	Nation	Gymnast	†	††	Flying Rings	Balance beam	Vault (gymnastics)	Gymnastics Events Totals	60 meters	Discus	Athletics Events Totals	Individual Grand Total
1st place, gold medalist(s)	Czechoslovakia	Vlasta Děkanová	9.65	14.85	9.55	14.9	14.76	63.66	10	10	20	83.66
2nd place, silver medalist(s)	Czechoslovakia	Zdeňka Veřmiřovská	9.4	14.1	9.9	14.55	14.76	62.71	10	10	20	82.71
3rd place, bronze medalist(s)	Czechoslovakia	Matylda Pálfyová	7.95	14.75	9.95	14.7	14.83	62.18	10	9.8	19.8	81.98
4	Poland	Janina Skirlińska	8.15	14.7	9.65	14.4	13.4	60.3	10	10	20	80.3
5	Czechoslovakia	Marie Skálová	7.35	14.7	9.2	14.25	14.6	60.1	10	10	20	80.1
6	Czechoslovakia	Anna Nezerpová	7.95	14.5	9.25	14.15	14.73	60.58	10	8.3	18.3	78.88
7	Yugoslavia	Lidija Rupnik	8.6	13.75	8.65	13.4	14.46	58.86	10	10	20	78.86
8	Yugoslavia	Ančka Hafner	9.25	14.7	8.75	14.2	14.5	61.4	10	7.3	17.3	78.7
9	Czechoslovakia	Marie Hendrychová	8.5	14.3	9.45	14.35	14.43	61.03	8	8.8	16.8	77.83
10	Czechoslovakia	Božena Dobešová	8.8	14.8	9.7	11.6	14.66	59.56	9	8.4	17.4	76.96
12	Yugoslavia	Milena Sket										75.21
13	Yugoslavia	Ema Kovačić										74.13
15	Yugoslavia	Jelica Vazzaz										73.16
17	Yugoslavia	Marta Pustišek										72.15
21	Yugoslavia	Marta Podpac										70.38
22	Yugoslavia	Dušica Radivojević										69.96

† Compulsory Uneven Bars †† Optional Uneven Bars

=== Vault ===
Medal	Country	Gymnast	Score
(tie)	Czechoslovakia	Matylda Pálfyová	14.83
(tie)	Poland	Marta Majowska	14.83
(tie)	Czechoslovakia	Božena Dobešová	14.76
(tie)	Czechoslovakia	Vlasta Děkanová	14.76
(tie)	Yugoslavia	Milena Sket	14.76

=== Compulsory Uneven Bars ===
Medal	Country	Gymnast	Score
Gold medal	Czechoslovakia	Vlasta Děkanová	9.65
Silver medal	Czechoslovakia	Zdeňka Veřmiřovská	9.40
Bronze medal	Yugoslavia	Ančka Hafner	9.25

=== Optional Uneven Bars ===
Medal	Country	Gymnast	Score
(tie)	Czechoslovakia	Vlasta Děkanová	14.85
(tie)	Czechoslovakia	Vlasta Foltová	14.80
(tie)	Czechoslovakia	Božena Dobešová	14.80

=== Balance Beam ===
Medal	Country	Gymnast	Score
Gold medal	Czechoslovakia	Vlasta Děkanová	14.90
Silver medal	Yugoslavia	Milena Sket	14.76
Bronze medal	Czechoslovakia	Vlasta Foltová	14.75

=== Flying Rings ===
Medal	Country	Gymnast	Score
Gold medal	Czechoslovakia	Matylda Pálfyová	9.95
Silver medal	Czechoslovakia	Zdeňka Veřmiřovská	9.90
(tie)	Czechoslovakia	Vlasta Foltová	9.80
(tie)	Poland	Wiesława Noskiewicz	9.80

=== 60 meters ===
Medal	Country	Gymnast	Time (seconds)
Gold medal	Yugoslavia	Ema Kovačić	8.30
Silver medal	Czechoslovakia	Vlasta Děkanová	8.40
Bronze medal	Czechoslovakia	Matylda Pálfyová	9.80

=== Discus ===
Medal	Country	Gymnast	Distance (meters)
Gold medal	Yugoslavia	Milena Sket	30.23
Silver medal	Czechoslovakia	Vlasta Děkanová	29.80
Bronze medal	Czechoslovakia	Marie Skálová	28.15
