= Gymnastics at the 1948 Summer Olympics – Men's rings =

Olympic gymnastics event

Men's rings at the Games of the XIV Olympiad
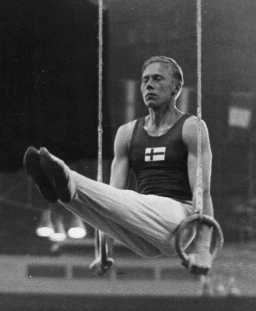
- Veikko Huhtanen competing on the rings
- Venue: Earls Court Exhibition Centre
- Dates: 12–13 August 1948
- Competitors: 121 from 16 nations
- Winning score: 39.6

Medalists
1st place, gold medalist(s)		Karl Frei; Switzerland
2nd place, silver medalist(s)		Michael Reusch; Switzerland
3rd place, bronze medalist(s)		Zdeněk Růžička; Czechoslovakia

The men's rings competition at the 1948 Summer Olympics was held at Earls Court Exhibition Centre on 12 and 13 August. It was the seventh appearance of the event. There were 121 competitors from 16 nations, with each nation sending a team of up to 8 gymnasts. The event was won by Karl Frei of Switzerland, with his countryman Michael Reusch earning silver; they were the nation's first medals in the event. Zdeněk Růžička of Czechoslovakia took bronze.

== Background ==
This was the seventh appearance of the event, which is one of the five apparatus events held every time there were apparatus events at the Summer Olympics (no apparatus events were held in 1900, 1908, 1912, or 1920). Two of the top 10 gymnasts from 1936 returned: sixth-place finisher Michael Reusch of Switzerland and eighth-place finisher (and 1932 competitor) Heikki Savolainen of Finland. No world championship had been held since World War II; Alois Hudec, who did not compete in 1948, was still the reigning world (1938) and Olympic (1936) champion. Reusch had finished second at the 1938 world championship.

Argentina, Cuba, Denmark, and Egypt each made their debut in the men's rings. The United States made its sixth appearance, most of any nation, having missed only the inaugural 1896 Games.

== Competition format ==
The gymnastics format continued to use the aggregation format. Each nation entered a team of up to eight gymnasts (Cuba and Argentina had only 7; Mexico only 5, with one not starting in the rings; and Austria had one gymnast of its 8 not start in the rings). All entrants in the gymnastics competitions performed both a compulsory exercise and a voluntary exercise for each apparatus, with the scores summed to give a final total. The scores in each of the six apparatus competitions were added together to give individual all-around scores; the top six individual scores on each team were summed to give a team all-around score. No separate finals were contested.

For each exercise, four judges gave scores from 0 to 10 in one-tenth point increments. The top and bottom scores were discarded and the remaining two scores summed to give the exercise total. If the two scores were sufficiently far apart, the judges would "confer" and decide on a score. Thus, exercise scores ranged from 0 to 20, apparatus scores from 0 to 40, individual totals from 0 to 240, and team scores from 0 to 1,440.

== Schedule ==
All times are British Summer Time (UTC+1)

Date	Time	Round
Thursday, 12 August 1948	9:00	Compulsory
Friday, 13 August 1948	9:00	Voluntary

== Results ==
Rank	Gymnast	Nation	Compulsory	Voluntary	Total
1st place, gold medalist(s)	Karl Frei	Switzerland	19.8	19.8	39.6
2nd place, silver medalist(s)	Michael Reusch	Switzerland	19.5	19.6	39.1
3rd place, bronze medalist(s)	Zdeněk Růžička	Czechoslovakia	18.8	19.7	38.5
4	Walter Lehmann	Switzerland	19.2	19.2	38.4
5	Josef Stalder	Switzerland	18.8	19.5	38.3
5	Emil Studer	Switzerland	18.9	19.4	38.3
7	Vladimír Karas	Czechoslovakia	18.9	19.3	38.2
8	Heikki Savolainen	Finland	19.0	19.1	38.1
9	László Baranyai	Hungary	18.7	19.2	37.9
9	Olavi Rove	Finland	18.8	19.1	37.9
11	Veikko Huhtanen	Finland	18.7	19.1	37.8
11	Christian Kipfer	Switzerland	18.8	19.0	37.8
11	Ferenc Pataki	Hungary	18.9	18.9	37.8
14	André Weingand	France	18.7	18.9	37.6
15	Elkana Grønne	Denmark	18.6	18.9	37.5
16	Kalevi Laitinen	Finland	18.6	18.8	37.4
17	Paavo Aaltonen	Finland	18.7	18.6	37.3
17	Jey Kugeler	Luxembourg	18.7	18.6	37.3
17	Aleksanteri Saarvala	Finland	18.5	18.8	37.3
17	Sulo Salmi	Finland	18.7	18.6	37.3
17	Leo Sotorník	Czechoslovakia	18.8	18.5	37.3
17	Lajos Tóth	Hungary	18.4	18.9	37.3
23	Antoine Schildwein	France	18.5	18.7	37.2
24	Robert Lucy	Switzerland	18.3	18.7	37.0
25	Pavel Benetka	Czechoslovakia	18.0	18.9	36.9
25	Vratislav Petráček	Czechoslovakia	18.4	18.5	36.9
27	Lajos Sántha	Hungary	18.6	18.2	36.8
27	Einari Teräsvirta	Finland	18.4	18.4	36.8
29	Alphonse Anger	France	18.4	18.3	36.7
29	Ferenc Várkõi	Hungary	18.9	17.8	36.7
31	Melchior Thalmann	Switzerland	17.8	18.7	36.5
32	Marcel de Wolf	France	17.6	18.8	36.4
32	Raymond Dot	France	18.4	18.0	36.4
32	Jozsef Fekete	Hungary	17.8	18.6	36.4
32	Miroslav Málek	Czechoslovakia	17.4	19.0	36.4
32	Ali Zaky	Egypt	17.7	18.7	36.4
37	Gyözö Mogyorosi	Hungary	17.6	18.7	36.3
38	Lucien Masset	France	17.6	18.6	36.2
39	Guido Figone	Italy	18.3	17.8	36.1
40	Savino Guglielmetti	Italy	17.7	18.3	36.0
40	Poul Jessen	Denmark	17.8	18.2	36.0
40	Josy Stoffel	Luxembourg	17.8	18.4	36.0
43	János Mogyorósi-Klencs	Hungary	17.65	18.2	35.85
44	René Schroeder	Luxembourg	17.2	18.5	35.7
44	Ernst Wister	Austria	17.8	17.9	35.7
46	Gustav Hrubý	Czechoslovakia	17.0	18.5	35.5
47	Michel Mathiot	France	17.5	17.9	35.4
48	Freddy Jensen	Denmark	17.5	17.8	35.3
49	Arnold Thomsen	Denmark	17.7	17.4	35.1
50	Mohamed Roushdi	Egypt	16.9	18.1	35.0
51	Ángel Aguiar	Cuba	16.8	18.1	34.9
52	Konrad Grilc	Yugoslavia	17.7	17.1	34.8
53	Vilhelm Møller	Denmark	17.3	17.4	34.7
54	Gunner Olesen	Denmark	16.7	17.9	34.6
54	Ed Scrobe	United States	17.8	16.8	34.6
56	Moustafa Abdelal	Egypt	17.0	17.5	34.5
57	Frank Turner	Great Britain	17.6	16.8	34.4
57	Quinto Vadi	Italy	17.6	16.8	34.4
59	Ivica Jelić	Yugoslavia	16.0	18.3	34.3
60	Domenico Grosso	Italy	17.0	17.2	34.2
60	Volmer Thomsen	Denmark	16.4	17.8	34.2
62	Luigi Zanetti	Italy	16.2	17.9	34.1
63	Karl Bohusch	Austria	16.4	17.5	33.9
63	Jack Flaherty	Great Britain	17.4	16.5	33.9
63	Fernando Lecuona	Cuba	17.1	16.8	33.9
66	Auguste Sirot	France	17.8	15.9	33.7
67	Stjepan Boltižar	Yugoslavia	16.9	16.6	33.5
67	Danilo Fioravanti	Italy	17.3	16.2	33.5
69	Mahmoud Abdel-Aal	Egypt	16.0	17.2	33.2
69	Roberto Villacián	Cuba	17.2	16.0	33.2
71	Alec Wales	Great Britain	16.95	16.2	33.15
72	Egidio Armelloni	Italy	15.75	17.3	33.05
73	František Wirth	Czechoslovakia	16.6	16.4	33.0
74	Baldomero Rubiera	Cuba	16.05	16.9	32.95
75	Vincent D'Autorio	United States	16.3	16.6	32.9
76	Pierre Schmitz	Luxembourg	17.0	15.7	32.7
77	Miro Longyka	Yugoslavia	16.0	16.6	32.6
78	Jos Bernard	Luxembourg	16.6	15.9	32.5
78	Josip Kujundžić	Yugoslavia	14.5	18.0	32.5
80	Drago Jelić	Yugoslavia	15.0	17.4	32.4
81	Polo Welfring	Luxembourg	17.1	15.2	32.3
81	Georges Wengler	Luxembourg	16.9	15.4	32.3
83	Pedro Lonchibuco	Argentina	16.2	16.0	32.2
83	Willi Schreyer	Austria	16.5	15.7	32.2
85	Rafael Lecuona	Cuba	16.8	15.2	32.0
86	Hans Sauter	Austria	16.2	15.6	31.8
87	William Bonsall	United States	16.05	15.7	31.75
88	Menn Krecke	Luxembourg	16.8	14.6	31.4
89	Hans Friedrich	Austria	14.0	17.3	31.3
90	George Weedon	Great Britain	16.8	14.4	31.2
91	Mohamed Aly	Egypt	17.3	13.7	31.0
91	Ray Sorensen	United States	16.8	14.2	31.0
93	Percy May	Great Britain	14.5	16.3	30.8
94	Ahmed Khalaf Ali	Egypt	15.0	15.7	30.7
95	Ali El-Hefnawi	Egypt	15.0	15.5	30.5
96	Frank Cumiskey	United States	15.5	14.8	30.3
97	Enrique Rapesta	Argentina	15.75	14.5	30.25
98	Robert Pranz	Austria	15.5	14.3	29.8
99	Joe Kotys	United States	15.4	14.2	29.4
100	Ken Buffin	Great Britain	14.5	14.8	29.3
101	Ettore Perego	Italy	13.8	14.7	28.5
102	Bill Roetzheim	United States	14.5	13.0	27.9
103	Jakob Šubelj	Yugoslavia	12.0	15.8	27.8
104	Ahmed Khalil El-Giddawi	Egypt	12.0	14.4	26.4
105	Alejandro Díaz	Cuba	13.0	13.2	26.2
106	Arturo Amos	Argentina	14.0	12.1	26.1
107	Ivor Vice	Great Britain	11.5	12.1	23.6
108	Glyn Hopkins	Great Britain	12.0	11.0	23.0
109	Jorge Soler	Argentina	10.0	12.8	22.8
110	César Bonoris	Argentina	10.5	12.0	22.5
111	Karel Janež	Yugoslavia	9.5	12.3	21.8
112	Raimundo Rey	Cuba	9.75	10.5	20.25
113	Roberto Núñez	Argentina	7.5	11.5	19.0
114	Børge Minerth	Denmark	17.8	—	17.8
115	Louis Bordo	United States	16.75	—	16.75
116	Jorge Castro	Mexico	6.5	8.0	14.5
117	Gottfried Hermann	Austria	14.25	—	14.25
118	Rubén Lira	Mexico	7.0	6.2	13.2
119	Dario Aguilar	Mexico	6.0	5.4	11.4
120	Everardo Rios	Mexico	11.0	—	11.0
121	Jorge Vidal	Argentina	8.0	—	8.0
