= Gymnastics at the 1948 Summer Olympics – Men's artistic team all-around =

Men's artistic team all-around at the Games of the XIV Olympiad
- Venue: Earls Court Exhibition Centre
- Date: 12–13 August 1948
- Competitors: 123 from 16 nations
- Winning score: 1,358.30

Medalists
| 1st place, gold medalist(s) | | Paavo Aaltonen; Veikko Huhtanen; Kalevi Laitinen; Olavi Rove; Aleksanteri Saarvala; Sulo Salmi; Heikki Savolainen; Einari Teräsvirta | Finland |
| 2nd place, silver medalist(s) | | Karl Frei; Christian Kipfer; Walter Lehmann; Robert Lucy; Michael Reusch; Josef Stalder; Emil Studer; Melchior Thalmann | Switzerland |
| 3rd place, bronze medalist(s) | | László Baranyai; Jozsef Fekete; Gyözö Mogyorosi; János Mogyorósi-Klencs; Ferenc Pataki; Lajos Sántha; Lajos Tóth; Ferenc Várkõi | Hungary |

The men's artistic team all-around competition at the 1948 Summer Olympics was held at Earls Court Exhibition Centre. It was held on 12 and 13 August, and was the ninth appearance of the event.

== Competition format ==
The gymnastics format continued to use the aggregation format. Each nation entered a team of up to eight gymnasts (Cuba and Argentina had only 7; Mexico only 5). All entrants in the gymnastics competitions performed both a compulsory exercise and a voluntary exercise for each apparatus, with the scores summed to give a final total. The scores in each of the six apparatus competitions were added together to give individual all-around scores; the top six individual scores on each team were summed to give a team all-around score. No separate finals were contested.

For each exercise, four judges gave scores from 0 to 10 in one-tenth point increments. The top and bottom scores were discarded and the remaining two scores summed to give the exercise total. If the two scores were sufficiently far apart, the judges would "confer" and decide on a score. Thus, exercise scores ranged from 0 to 20, apparatus scores from 0 to 40, individual totals from 0 to 240, and team scores from 0 to 1,440.

== Results ==
| Rank | Nation | Gymnasts | Individual results | | | | | | | Team total |
| Rank | Nation | Gymnasts | Floor (gymnastics) | Pommel horse | Rings (gymnastics) | Parallel bars | Horizontal bar | Vault (gymnastics) | Total | Team total |
|---|---|---|---|---|---|---|---|---|---|---|
| 1st place, gold medalist(s) | Finland | Veikko Huhtanen | 36.3 | 38.7 | 37.8 | 39.3 | 39.2 | 38.4 | 229.7 | 1,358.30 |
| 1st place, gold medalist(s) | Finland | Paavo Aaltonen | 36.5 | 38.7 | 37.3 | 38.8 | 38.4 | 39.1 | 228.8 | 1,358.30 |
| 1st place, gold medalist(s) | Finland | Kalevi Laitinen | 37.15 | 36.9 | 37.4 | 38.1 | 38.1 | 38.0 | 225.65 | 1,358.30 |
| 1st place, gold medalist(s) | Finland | Olavi Rove | 35.8 | 36.5 | 37.9 | 38.6 | 37.4 | 39.0 | 225.2 | 1,358.30 |
| 1st place, gold medalist(s) | Finland | Einari Teräsvirta | 35.8 | 37.0 | 36.8 | 38.4 | 38.7 | 38.3 | 225.0 | 1,358.30 |
| 1st place, gold medalist(s) | Finland | Heikki Savolainen | 34.65 | 38.7 | 38.1 | 38.9 | 37.1 | 36.5 | 223.95 | 1,358.30 |
| 1st place, gold medalist(s) | Finland | Aleksanteri Saarvala | 33.9 | 37.7 | 37.3 | 37.6 | 38.8 | 36.8 | ~~222.1~~ | 1,358.30 |
| 1st place, gold medalist(s) | Finland | Sulo Salmi | 32.05 | 35.2 | 37.3 | 36.8 | 38.0 | 38.1 | ~~217.45~~ | 1,358.30 |
| 2nd place, silver medalist(s) | Switzerland | Walter Lehmann | 36.5 | 37.6 | 38.4 | 39.0 | 39.4 | 38.1 | 229.0 | 1,356.70 |
| 2nd place, silver medalist(s) | Switzerland | Josef Stalder | 37.0 | 37.7 | 38.3 | 39.1 | 39.7 | 36.9 | 228.7 | 1,356.70 |
| 2nd place, silver medalist(s) | Switzerland | Christian Kipfer | 36.5 | 37.2 | 37.8 | 39.1 | 38.6 | 37.9 | 227.1 | 1,356.70 |
| 2nd place, silver medalist(s) | Switzerland | Emil Studer | 36.0 | 37.7 | 38.3 | 37.8 | 38.8 | 38.0 | 226.6 | 1,356.70 |
| 2nd place, silver medalist(s) | Switzerland | Robert Lucy | 36.0 | 37.1 | 37.0 | 37.8 | 37.5 | 37.9 | 223.3 | 1,356.70 |
| 2nd place, silver medalist(s) | Switzerland | Michael Reusch | 33.9 | 37.8 | 39.1 | 39.5 | 38.4 | 33.3 | 222.0 | 1,356.70 |
| 2nd place, silver medalist(s) | Switzerland | Melchior Thalmann | 36.6 | 36.5 | 36.5 | 37.9 | 35.5 | 37.6 | ~~220.6~~ | 1,356.70 |
| 2nd place, silver medalist(s) | Switzerland | Karl Frei | 35.0 | 36.4 | 39.6 | 36.9 | 33.7 | 35.6 | ~~217.2~~ | 1,356.70 |
| 3rd place, bronze medalist(s) | Hungary | Lajos Tóth | 36.8 | 36.3 | 37.3 | 38.2 | 38.6 | 38.0 | 225.2 | 1,330.85 |
| 3rd place, bronze medalist(s) | Hungary | Lajos Sántha | 37.3 | 37.1 | 36.8 | 38.7 | 38.8 | 35.6 | 224.3 | 1,330.85 |
| 3rd place, bronze medalist(s) | Hungary | László Baranyai | 36.0 | 36.3 | 37.9 | 38.1 | 36.5 | 37.6 | 222.4 | 1,330.85 |
| 3rd place, bronze medalist(s) | Hungary | Ferenc Pataki | 38.7 | 35.2 | 37.8 | 38.0 | 33.1 | 38.5 | 221.3 | 1,330.85 |
| 3rd place, bronze medalist(s) | Hungary | János Mogyorósi-Klencs | 38.4 | 34.3 | 35.85 | 35.9 | 36.0 | 38.5 | 218.95 | 1,330.85 |
| 3rd place, bronze medalist(s) | Hungary | Ferenc Várkõi | 36.3 | 36.4 | 36.7 | 36.6 | 34.7 | 38.0 | 218.7 | 1,330.85 |
| 3rd place, bronze medalist(s) | Hungary | Jozsef Fekete | 36.6 | 36.9 | 36.4 | 37.1 | 33.7 | 37.9 | ~~218.6~~ | 1,330.85 |
| 3rd place, bronze medalist(s) | Hungary | Gyözö Mogyorosi | 35.7 | 34.8 | 36.3 | 36.4 | 36.8 | 34.3 | ~~214.3~~ | 1,330.85 |
| 4 | France | Raymond Dot | 37.8 | 32.4 | 36.4 | 38.0 | 38.8 | 37.4 | 220.8 | 1,313.85 |
| 4 | France | Michel Mathiot | 37.2 | 36.0 | 35.4 | 38.2 | 37.8 | 35.8 | 220.4 | 1,313.85 |
| 4 | France | Lucien Masset | 36.9 | 37.2 | 36.2 | 34.35 | 38.5 | 36.8 | 219.95 | 1,313.85 |
| 4 | France | André Weingand | 36.5 | 35.7 | 37.6 | 37.0 | 37.6 | 35.4 | 219.8 | 1,313.85 |
| 4 | France | Antoine Schildwein | 36.7 | 34.8 | 37.2 | 35.4 | 36.0 | 36.4 | 216.5 | 1,313.85 |
| 4 | France | Alphonse Anger | 36.0 | 34.9 | 36.7 | 36.8 | 37.6 | 34.4 | 216.4 | 1,313.85 |
| 4 | France | Marcel de Wolf | 36.0 | 36.2 | 36.4 | 35.7 | 34.8 | 35.3 | ~~214.4~~ | 1,313.85 |
| 4 | France | Auguste Sirot | 35.4 | 36.3 | 33.7 | 35.6 | 37.9 | 35.2 | ~~214.1~~ | 1,313.85 |
| 5 | Italy | Guido Figone | 37.0 | 38.2 | 36.1 | 38.3 | 38.0 | 37.7 | 225.3 | 1,300.30 |
| 5 | Italy | Luigi Zanetti | 37.2 | 38.3 | 34.1 | 37.3 | 37.3 | 34.8 | 219.0 | 1,300.30 |
| 5 | Italy | Savino Guglielmetti | 32.3 | 36.9 | 36.0 | 38.5 | 37.2 | 36.3 | 217.2 | 1,300.30 |
| 5 | Italy | Domenico Grosso | 34.6 | 36.6 | 34.2 | 35.4 | 36.6 | 36.7 | 214.1 | 1,300.30 |
| 5 | Italy | Quinto Vadi | 34.1 | 37.4 | 34.4 | 35.7 | 36.6 | 35.8 | 214.0 | 1,300.30 |
| 5 | Italy | Danilo Fioravanti | 36.3 | 34.4 | 33.5 | 35.9 | 36.6 | 34.0 | 210.7 | 1,300.30 |
| 5 | Italy | Ettore Perego | 35.3 | 37.5 | 28.5 | 33.4 | 35.4 | 36.2 | ~~206.3~~ | 1,300.30 |
| 5 | Italy | Egidio Armelloni | 32.6 | 35.9 | 33.05 | 35.0 | 34.8 | 23.7 | ~~195.05~~ | 1,300.30 |
| 6 | Czechoslovakia | Zdeněk Růžička | 38.1 | 36.3 | 38.5 | 38.8 | 37.9 | 36.6 | 226.2 | 1,292.10 |
| 6 | Czechoslovakia | Pavel Benetka | 37.6 | 33.6 | 36.9 | 37.3 | 37.6 | 37.3 | 220.3 | 1,292.10 |
| 6 | Czechoslovakia | Miroslav Málek | 35.1 | 33.1 | 36.4 | 34.5 | 36.6 | 37.2 | 212.9 | 1,292.10 |
| 6 | Czechoslovakia | Vladimír Karas | 37.4 | 33.6 | 38.2 | 36.7 | 33.9 | 32.4 | 212.2 | 1,292.10 |
| 6 | Czechoslovakia | Leo Sotorník | 37.6 | 31.4 | 37.3 | 34.8 | 31.2 | 38.5 | 210.8 | 1,292.10 |
| 6 | Czechoslovakia | František Wirth | 34.55 | 33.9 | 33.0 | 34.15 | 37.2 | 36.9 | 209.7 | 1,292.10 |
| 6 | Czechoslovakia | Vratislav Petráček | 34.2 | 32.3 | 36.9 | 35.3 | 31.3 | 33.3 | ~~203.3~~ | 1,292.10 |
| 6 | Czechoslovakia | Gustav Hrubý | 36.1 | 35.6 | 35.5 | 26.8 | 21.3 | 37.8 | ~~193.1~~ | 1,292.10 |
| 7 | United States | Ed Scrobe | 34.3 | 35.6 | 34.6 | 37.8 | 36.6 | 35.0 | 213.9 | 1,252.50 |
| 7 | United States | Vincent D'Autorio | 36.8 | 35.2 | 32.9 | 34.5 | 35.4 | 36.5 | 211.3 | 1,252.50 |
| 7 | United States | Bill Roetzheim | 36.3 | 36.4 | 27.9 | 36.0 | 36.4 | 36.1 | 209.1 | 1,252.50 |
| 7 | United States | Joe Kotys | 34.8 | 36.5 | 29.4 | 37.4 | 34.0 | 36.4 | 208.5 | 1,252.50 |
| 7 | United States | Frank Cumiskey | 31.15 | 37.9 | 30.3 | 34.0 | 37.3 | 34.5 | 205.15 | 1,252.50 |
| 7 | United States | Ray Sorensen | 33.45 | 35.6 | 31.0 | 33.1 | 35.5 | 35.9 | 204.55 | 1,252.50 |
| 7 | United States | William Bonsall | 33.2 | 33.2 | 31.75 | 33.1 | 32.95 | 37.5 | ~~201.7~~ | 1,252.50 |
| 7 | United States | Louis Bordo | 17.6 | 12.0 | 16.75 | 14.9 | 15.75 | – | ~~77.0~~ | 1,252.50 |
| 8 | Denmark | Poul Jessen | 36.6 | 33.8 | 36.0 | 35.8 | 35.0 | 37.1 | 214.3 | 1,245.40 |
| 8 | Denmark | Elkana Grønne | 37.65 | 32.25 | 37.5 | 35.8 | 33.1 | 37.2 | 213.5 | 1,245.40 |
| 8 | Denmark | Freddy Jensen | 37.0 | 34.3 | 35.3 | 34.1 | 33.95 | 33.7 | 208.35 | 1,245.40 |
| 8 | Denmark | Arnold Thomsen | 36.6 | 31.65 | 35.1 | 32.1 | 33.3 | 37.5 | 206.25 | 1,245.40 |
| 8 | Denmark | Vilhelm Møller | 37.0 | 28.7 | 34.7 | 31.9 | 31.85 | 37.6 | 201.75 | 1,245.40 |
| 8 | Denmark | Volmer Thomsen | 35.7 | 29.3 | 34.2 | 33.55 | 32.8 | 35.7 | 201.25 | 1,245.40 |
| 8 | Denmark | Gunner Olesen | 36.8 | 27.3 | 34.6 | 34.3 | 22.9 | 37.4 | ~~193.3~~ | 1,245.40 |
| 8 | Denmark | Børge Minerth | 19.0 | 16.0 | 17.8 | 34.5 | 31.9 | 37.1 | ~~156.3~~ | 1,245.40 |
| 9 | Austria | Ernst Wister | 37.2 | 36.4 | 35.7 | 36.1 | 35.8 | 37.7 | 218.9 | 1,212.15 |
| 9 | Austria | Karl Bohusch | 37.1 | 36.3 | 33.9 | 33.8 | 36.7 | 36.6 | 214.4 | 1,212.15 |
| 9 | Austria | Hans Friedrich | 36.5 | 33.5 | 31.3 | 36.4 | 31.3 | 36.8 | 205.8 | 1,212.15 |
| 9 | Austria | Willi Schreyer | 36.1 | 34.9 | 32.2 | 33.0 | 36.1 | 33.1 | 205.4 | 1,212.15 |
| 9 | Austria | Hans Sauter | 33.75 | 36.0 | 31.8 | 34.25 | 34.4 | 32.9 | 203.1 | 1,212.15 |
| 9 | Austria | Robert Pranz | 28.75 | 31.6 | 29.8 | 24.0 | 29.4 | 21.0 | 164.55 | 1,212.15 |
| 9 | Austria | Gottfried Hermann | 15.5 | 16.4 | 14.25 | 32.3 | 35.1 | 18.75 | ~~132.3~~ | 1,212.15 |
| 9 | Austria | Willi Welt | – | – | – | 2.0 | – | – | ~~2.0~~ | 1,212.15 |
| 10 | Yugoslavia | Konrad Grilc | 34.35 | 35.6 | 34.8 | 35.7 | 35.9 | 36.7 | 213.05 | 1,194.80 |
| 10 | Yugoslavia | Josip Kujundžić | 37.1 | 32.0 | 32.5 | 34.5 | 35.5 | 37.3 | 208.9 | 1,194.80 |
| 10 | Yugoslavia | Miro Longyka | 35.7 | 29.6 | 32.6 | 31.1 | 33.9 | 37.5 | 200.4 | 1,194.80 |
| 10 | Yugoslavia | Drago Jelić | 29.9 | 32.75 | 32.4 | 28.45 | 33.9 | 34.4 | 191.8 | 1,194.80 |
| 10 | Yugoslavia | Ivica Jelić | 31.75 | 32.9 | 34.3 | 29.0 | 27.0 | 36.8 | 191.75 | 1,194.80 |
| 10 | Yugoslavia | Stjepan Boltižar | 33.8 | 32.8 | 33.5 | 30.7 | 26.1 | 32.0 | 188.9 | 1,194.80 |
| 10 | Yugoslavia | Jakob Šubelj | 33.15 | 29.25 | 27.8 | 24.8 | 26.4 | 37.1 | ~~178.5~~ | 1,194.80 |
| 10 | Yugoslavia | Karel Janež | 29.85 | 23.6 | 21.8 | 29.0 | 16.0 | 32.2 | ~~152.45~~ | 1,194.80 |
| 11 | Luxembourg | Jey Kugeler | 36.1 | 34.2 | 37.3 | 34.8 | 34.6 | 37.0 | 214.0 | 1,150.45 |
| 11 | Luxembourg | Josy Stoffel | 35.8 | 32.5 | 36.0 | 31.2 | 31.45 | 36.4 | 203.35 | 1,150.45 |
| 11 | Luxembourg | Polo Welfring | 33.5 | 25.0 | 32.3 | 27.45 | 33.9 | 37.1 | 189.25 | 1,150.45 |
| 11 | Luxembourg | René Schroeder | 35.95 | 21.5 | 35.7 | 29.25 | 30.3 | 35.3 | 188.0 | 1,150.45 |
| 11 | Luxembourg | Menn Krecke | 32.15 | 25.2 | 31.4 | 28.95 | 27.35 | 35.5 | 180.55 | 1,150.45 |
| 11 | Luxembourg | Pierre Schmitz | 25.8 | 22.55 | 32.7 | 27.25 | 31.2 | 35.8 | 175.3 | 1,150.45 |
| 11 | Luxembourg | Jos Bernard | 30.25 | 19.75 | 32.5 | 26.7 | 32.0 | 31.2 | ~~172.4~~ | 1,150.45 |
| 11 | Luxembourg | Georges Wengler | 27.65 | 28.25 | 32.3 | 23.75 | 23.15 | 31.6 | ~~166.7~~ | 1,150.45 |
| 12 | Great Britain | George Weedon | 34.1 | 31.6 | 31.2 | 35.8 | 36.5 | 36.4 | 205.6 | 1,114.40 |
| 12 | Great Britain | Frank Turner | 34.35 | 32.75 | 34.4 | 35.7 | 29.2 | 36.2 | 202.6 | 1,114.40 |
| 12 | Great Britain | Ken Buffin | 31.55 | 27.2 | 29.3 | 31.3 | 34.4 | 34.9 | 188.65 | 1,114.40 |
| 12 | Great Britain | Alec Wales | 30.5 | 35.8 | 33.15 | 33.9 | 29.45 | 18.0 | 180.8 | 1,114.40 |
| 12 | Great Britain | Percy May | 30.0 | 26.75 | 30.8 | 31.2 | 19.5 | 33.2 | 171.45 | 1,114.40 |
| 12 | Great Britain | Jack Flaherty | 23.25 | 26.5 | 33.9 | 28.75 | 36.9 | 16.0 | 165.3 | 1,114.40 |
| 12 | Great Britain | Glyn Hopkins | 25.75 | 23.95 | 23.0 | 21.25 | 13.75 | 27.1 | ~~134.8~~ | 1,114.40 |
| 12 | Great Britain | Ivor Vice | 28.5 | 23.5 | 23.6 | 16.25 | 13.0 | 29.65 | ~~134.5~~ | 1,114.40 |
| 13 | Egypt | Ali Zaky | 30.0 | 18.05 | 36.4 | 33.7 | 33.0 | 36.4 | 187.55 | 1,057.95 |
| 13 | Egypt | Moustafa Abdelal | 27.0 | 25.75 | 34.5 | 30.0 | 30.45 | 30.0 | 177.7 | 1,057.95 |
| 13 | Egypt | Mohamed Roushdi | 23.75 | 23.35 | 35.0 | 34.6 | 30.2 | 30.45 | 177.35 | 1,057.95 |
| 13 | Egypt | Ahmed Khalaf Ali | 26.25 | 24.85 | 30.7 | 31.8 | 30.05 | 33.5 | 177.15 | 1,057.95 |
| 13 | Egypt | Ali El-Hefnawi | 32.0 | 15.05 | 30.5 | 30.7 | 24.3 | 37.0 | 169.55 | 1,057.95 |
| 13 | Egypt | Mohamed Aly | 31.1 | 12.5 | 31.0 | 31.75 | 28.5 | 33.8 | 168.65 | 1,057.95 |
| 13 | Egypt | Mahmoud Abdel-Aal | 28.0 | 14.05 | 33.2 | 34.5 | 28.0 | 29.75 | ~~167.5~~ | 1,057.95 |
| 13 | Egypt | Ahmed Khalil El-Giddawi | 24.75 | 14.5 | 26.4 | 29.7 | 25.5 | 28.0 | ~~148.85~~ | 1,057.95 |
| 14 | Cuba | Rafael Lecuona | 29.25 | 34.3 | 32.0 | 31.8 | 26.35 | 34.0 | 187.7 | 950.70 |
| 14 | Cuba | Fernando Lecuona | 25.3 | 29.5 | 33.9 | 32.95 | 17.3 | 27.4 | 166.35 | 950.70 |
| 14 | Cuba | Ángel Aguiar | 31.0 | 20.2 | 34.9 | 27.45 | 14.5 | 28.1 | 156.15 | 950.70 |
| 14 | Cuba | Raimundo Rey | 31.3 | 29.85 | 20.25 | 24.3 | 16.25 | 30.1 | 152.05 | 950.70 |
| 14 | Cuba | Baldomero Rubiera | 23.8 | 21.5 | 32.95 | 22.5 | 19.0 | 31.4 | 151.15 | 950.70 |
| 14 | Cuba | Roberto Villacián | 27.25 | 24.4 | 33.2 | 22.65 | 16.5 | 13.3 | 137.3 | 950.70 |
| 14 | Cuba | Alejandro Díaz | 29.05 | 27.75 | 26.2 | 17.25 | 16.5 | 20.0 | ~~136.75~~ | 950.70 |
| 15 | Argentina | Arturo Amos | 32.3 | 23.35 | 26.1 | 31.25 | 29.55 | 34.3 | 176.85 | 863.85 |
| 15 | Argentina | Pedro Lonchibuco | 25.75 | 18.5 | 32.2 | 28.3 | 20.5 | 28.95 | 154.2 | 863.85 |
| 15 | Argentina | Enrique Rapesta | 24.5 | 21.5 | 30.25 | 25.0 | 25.05 | 22.6 | 148.9 | 863.85 |
| 15 | Argentina | César Bonoris | 23.0 | 14.0 | 22.5 | 28.45 | 22.2 | 29.5 | 139.65 | 863.85 |
| 15 | Argentina | Jorge Soler | 23.3 | 17.0 | 22.8 | 20.5 | 21.4 | 29.3 | 134.3 | 863.85 |
| 15 | Argentina | Roberto Núñez | 21.75 | 12.0 | 19.0 | 18.5 | 14.4 | 24.3 | 109.95 | 863.85 |
| 15 | Argentina | Jorge Vidal | – | 11.8 | 8.0 | 6.5 | 6.0 | 5.0 | ~~37.2~~ | 863.85 |
| 16 | Mexico | Jorge Castro | 20.0 | 11.0 | 14.5 | 14.5 | 17.0 | 26.9 | 103.9 | 343.85 |
| 16 | Mexico | Rubén Lira | 17.0 | 14.0 | 13.2 | 12.25 | 17.0 | 25.5 | 98.95 | 343.85 |
| 16 | Mexico | Dionisio Aguilar | 11.0 | 14.0 | 11.4 | 17.0 | 8.0 | 20.4 | 81.8 | 343.85 |
| 16 | Mexico | Everardo Rios | 12.0 | 4.7 | 11.0 | 9.5 | 6.0 | 12.0 | 55.2 | 343.85 |
| 16 | Mexico | Nicanor Villarreal | 4.0 | – | – | – | – | – | 4.0 | 343.85 |
