= Matylda Pálfyová =

Czechoslovak/Slovak gymnast

Matylda Vilma Pálfyová
- Matylda Pálfyová at the 1938 World Championships.

Personal information
- Full name: Matylda Vilma Pálfyová
- Nickname: Maťa
- Born: 11 March 1912 Hernádszentistván, Austria-Hungary (now Kostoľany nad Hornádom, Slovakia)
- Died: 23 September 1944 (aged 32) Brestovany, Trnava Region, Slovakia

Gymnastics career
- Discipline: Women's artistic gymnastics
- Country represented: Czechoslovakia
- Club: TJ Sokol Košice
Medal record
Representing Czechoslovakia
Olympic Games
Silver medal – second place	1936 Berlin	Team
World Championships
Gold medal – first place	1938 Prague	Team
Gold medal – first place	1938 Prague	Vault
Bronze medal – third place	1938 Prague	All-around

Matylda Vilma Pálfyová (11 March 1912 – 23 September 1944) was a Slovak gymnast who competed in the 1936 Summer Olympics, helping her team to a silver medal. She was the first female Slovak Olympic medalist and world champion. She also competed at the 1938 World Artistic Gymnastics Championships, where she won two gold medals in team, vault and the bronze medal in the all-around competitions.

== Biography ==
=== Personal life ===
She was born in Hernádszentistván, Kingdom of Hungary, Austria-Hungary (now Kostoľany nad Hornádom, Slovakia). Her first job was as a correspondent in the construction company of Ing. Beřich Minařa, who was a member of Sokol and fully supported Matylda. Then Pálfyová worked in Košice as a correspondent from the age of 18, between 1934 and 1937 at Východoslovenské elektrárne, úč. spol. At the administrative building of Východoslovenská energetika, a.s. in Košice today a memorial plaque commemorates her. In 1937, she moved to Bratislava, where she worked at Západoslovenské elektrárne, úč. spol. She was also a member of the Academic Singing Association. Its conductor was the music composer Ján Cikker, to whom Pálfyová even became engaged. Finally, in 1942, she married offtheir JUDr. Ondrej Marek, their marriage lasted only two years until the gymnast's death.

She died on 23 September 1944 in Brestovany while riding her favorite mare, which was attacked by a wild stallion while galloping. Matylda fell to the ground, but remained hanging in the stirrups and the frightened mare dragged her around. When the people freed her, she was already dead. She died as a result of a fracture of the lower skull bone at the age of only 32. After her death, her husband JUDr. Marek went to the warfront at the beginning of 1945 and all trace of him was lost. Their marriage was childless due to its brevity. She is buried at the new cemetery in Trnava.

=== Gymnastics career ===
When she studied at the Gymnasium, she became a member of the Sokol Košice at the age of twelve. She started doing gymnastics there at the age of 15. She finished high school and took part in the first competition in Prague in 1932 (tools, simple training, athletics), where she won 3rd place overall.

In addition to her job, she worked hard on herself, which earned her participation in the search competition in sports gymnastics, which took place on 16 July 1935 in Prague. Matylda, who placed 26th out of 33 competitors, did not initially make it to the team of the ČOS. However, Kobelářová dropped out, as she had to decline the nomination for official reasons, and she was the one who got the chance. She accepted her chance in the ČOS team as an opportunity of a lifetime and trained hard for two years.

==== Major competitions ====
"I am a happy Slovak woman that served the nation and the homeland as a small member of it."

— Matylda Pálfyová

As part of the Sokol (ČOS) team, she went to various demonstration exercises to prepare for the Olympic Games. After 1935, her sports activities started successfully, when she was one of Czechoslovakia's best female gymnasts. She scored 7.3 and took fourth place in the so-called elimination (i.e. nomination) Sokol competitions on 18 May 1936 and thereby secured participation in the 1936 Summer Olympic Games in Berlin. At the 1936 Olympic Games in Berlin, she won a silver medal in the women's team competition (the only gymnastics discipline for women) as a member of the Czechoslovakia women's national artistic gymnastics team.

At the 1938 World Gymnastics Championships in Prague, the strength of the Czechoslovak team, operating on the basis of the Sokol physical education units, was fully demonstrated. As a member of the Czechoslovakia team, Pálfyová won the title of world champion, while she received the highest marks in rings and vault. She also won bronze in the women's all-around behind compatriots Vlasta Děkanová and Zdenka Veřmiřovská.

In 1939, after the establishment of the First Slovak Republic, she quit gymnastics because she refused to train in the physical education organization Hlinkova garda. She worked as part of the Club of Slovak Tourists and Skiers, where she was engaged in canoeing or equestrianism.

== Legacy ==
The Slovak Olympic and Sports Committee awards the Matylda Pálfyová Award annually since 2005, which is intended exclusively for women - for their sporting achievements, activity in sports and in the Olympic movement.

== Competition history ==
Year	Event	Team	AA	VT	UB	BB	FX
1936	Sokol Gymnastics Competitions	3rd place, bronze medalist(s)	4				
1936	Olympic Games	2nd place, silver medalist(s)					
1938
1938	World Championships	1st place, gold medalist(s)	3rd place, bronze medalist(s)	1st place, gold medalist(s)			1st place, gold medalist(s)
