= Jelica Vazzaz =

Slovene gymnast (1914–2007)

- Vazazz in 1934, Teachers College Graduation portrait

Personal information
- Full name: Jelica Helena Zoe Vazazz
- Born: 5 August 1914 Gorizia, Austria-Hungary
- Died: 15 June 2007 (aged 92)

Gymnastics career
- Discipline: Women's artistic gymnastics
- Country represented: Yugoslavia/Slovenia
- Head coach: Viktor Murnik
Medal record
Representing Yugoslavia
World Championships
Silver medal – second place	1938 Prague	Team

Jelica Helena Zoe Vazzaz (5 August 1914 – 15 June 2007) was a Slovenian artistic gymnast who competed for Yugoslavia. She was a part of the silver medal-winning Yugoslav team at the 2nd-ever World Championships at which a women's competition was included. A survivor of World War II concentration camps and political persecution, Vazzaz was a teacher of both academics and gymnastics, the Yugoslav national team coach for over two decades, a top-level international judge, a pioneer of rhythmic gymnastics, a professor, an author of many monographs and journal articles, and an overall promoter of physical well-being. She has been referred to as the most important woman of Slovenian physical culture.

== Early life ==
Jelica Vazzaz was born on 5 August 1914 in Gorizia, Austria-Hungary (now Italy). She was the third of four children born to father Ludovik (born near Slovenska Bistrica) and mother Terezija (née Kololaj). Ludovik was sent to school in Vienna because of his scholastic aptitude, and was the author of a geography textbook. One of the names he gave Jelica was "Helena" in memory of a daughter of the family he lived with in Vienna, the other was "Zoe", named after a family friend. Her mother Terezija came from Pula, Croatia. She married Ludovik and accompanied him to Vienna for his studies. Terezija was a homemaker. Her father Ludovik taught history and geography at the Bezigrad Grammar School. Her two older siblings were a sister, Liudmile, and a brother, Vladimir, and her younger brother was named Vidko. In 1915, a bomb destroyed their home and they moved around from village to village during World War I. After living in a few other villages during World War I, the family lived in Maribor for a little while and then moved to Ljubljana. Her younger brother Vitko died (perhaps from diphtheria) when he was 5 and she was 12 or 13. The family had a few students who Ludovik taught, in an extracurricular fashion, for additional money.

== Education and teaching career ==
Vazzaz's Diploma from the National Institute of Physical Education, Belgrade, former Yugoslavia

Vazzaz completed all her primary schooling but was delayed by a year from entering teachers' college due to being born 2 months too late into the year. When she finished school at the Ljubljana Teachers' College in 1934, her political associations with the Sokol Society led to her having to wait four years for a full-time job. At that time, she worked part-time at a classical grammar school, and at the same time at the Poljane Grammar School. In 1938, she got her first job in Dolenjska as a subject teacher at the primary school in Trebelno nad Mokronogom from which she was transferred to the primary school in Doljni Karteljevo in 1941, where she was acting school principal. In 1939, the first higher school for physical education in the Kingdom of Yugoslavia opened in Belgrade, which she really wanted to attend. Her mother Terezija sold all her jewelry, determined that Jelica would be able to afford to pursue the higher educational opportunities that she was not able to afford for her two older children, thus providing her the money to complete the two-year program in Belgrade where she was the first Slovenian professional student at the college. At that time, she was already teaching in Trebelno, but she was nevertheless granted paid leave by the Ministry of Education. At the time when she was studying and living in a boarding school in Belgrade, the Belgrade area was engulfed by World War II, so just before the end of her studies, she had to return home. Later, she completed the newly established third and fourth year of the formerly-two-year-program and in 1951 graduated from the National Institute of Physical Education. She was given the title of Senior Coach for Rhythmic Gymnastics.

== World War II Activism ==
Her studies were halted because of World War II and she did not finish her course of study until 1955. During the war, Vazzaz joined the Red Cross as a Volunteer and was an activist with the Slovenian Liberation Front. At one point, she replaced Zoran Polič who had been the organization's head. She organized and carried out various illegal and dangerous activities for the resistance, and at one point was arrested by the Gestapo and imprisoned for 4 months at Miklošičeva Road in Ljubljana where she was held in solitary confinement while hostages were shot. Later, she was transferred to Ravensbrück concentration camp. During her nearly 2 years total in captivity, she sometimes did very physically demanding work. This was a fate that she shared with other competitive gymnasts and Sokol members, from Slavic nations during the time, such as compatriots Lidija Rupnik and Marta Pustišek, as well as Czechoslovaks František Erben, František Pecháček, Ladislav Vácha, Jan Gajdoš, and Vlasta Děkanová, a number of whom did not survive World War II. She was freed at the end of the war, and returned home to Ljubljana in Mid July 1945.

== Gymnastics career ==
=== Competitive career ===
Vazzaz started attending in the Narodni dom in Ljubljana at age 6, and joined Sokol in 1928, under the leadership of Milica Šepa. Many other World Championship and Olympic medalists and champions involved with Slovenian Sokol, such as Viktor Murnik, Boris Gregorka, Peter Šumi, and Miroslav Cerar were in close proximity. Vazzaz eventually became Murnik's closest co-worker and he was a mentor to her. Towards the beginning of her competitive year, she attended the 1930 All-Sokol rally in Belgrade which included a large delegation from Czechoslovakia and several smaller delegations from other countries. A couple of years later, she helped her team to the 1932 Yugoslav National Youth Champion title. That same year, at the All-Sokol Slet in 1932, her team won the volleyball championships. Her last competitive year was in 1941 where she won Gold in the Javelin Throw at the 1941 Slovenian Championships.

In the annals of international competitive gymnastics, her greatest achievement was probably her helping her Yugoslav team to the silver medal at the 1938 World Championships behind the Czechoslovaks who defended their title from the previous 1934 World Championships. Her teammate Lidija Rupnik led the team in scoring, placing 7th in the all-around, and Vazzaz won 15th place out of 40 competitors, being the 5th highest-scoring individual on her team of 8. Incidentally, very unsportsmanlike behavior surrounded the Polish team who took 3rd place to Yugoslavia's 2nd place, although in the team free exercise, her Yugoslav team performed to a Polonaise piece by Polish composer Frédéric Chopin.

L-R: (?) Babinek, (?) Maria, Ruša Pustišek, Lidija Rupnik-Šifrer, Vazzaz, Marta Pustišek. This photograph of the 1932 Slovenian Sokol Volleyball Team Champions includes three individuals (Rupnik-Šifrer, Vazzaz, and Marta Pustišek) who would later help their Yugoslav national women's team to their only World Championships team medal (silver), to date, in the sport of Artistic Gymnastics at the 1938 World Championships in Prague. Rupnik-Šifrer and Marta Pustišek were both also on the Yugoslav gymnastics team at the 1936 Berlin Olympics.

=== Coach ===
Vazzaz was the coach of the Slovenian as well as Yugoslav national teams in gymnastics from 1946 to 1970. Among the gymnasts she coached were Vida Gerbec, Nevenka Pogačnik, Zdenka Cerar, and Marlenka Kovac – all of whom were World Championships and/or Olympic team members through the 1940s-1970s. One telling moment of the importance of her coaching and program occurred at the 1961 Youth Day in Belgrade featuring 2,000 young women from all the Yugoslav republics. President and Prime Minister of Yugoslavia for over 35 years Josip Broz Tito more than once made a great gesture during snack times during this festival where he once said "Vsi stran, to moje pionirke iz Ljubljane prve dobijo!" - "Everyone away, this is what my pioneers from Ljubljana get first!", even clearing away male army members. Tito was a helpful supporter of Vazzaz.

In recollection, her students praised her. Dr. Doljana Novak, a gifted student of hers, continued to look up to Vazzaz even when Novak was a Doctor. Novak said that Vazzaz was strict, honest, consistent, combative and uncompromising. Additionally, Novak said that although Vazzaz did not keep in touch with the trends of such things as computers, she knew how to play a supporting role. Zdenka Cerar said that Vazzaz was very consistent as a trainer and laid down penalties for tardiness or absence, often by banning a student from attending the next training session. Cerar also intimated that Vazzaz would give ear to her students' personal problems, which was unusual among trainers during the time, and her compassion and attention extended not only to her most gifted students but to those who were struggling as well, and she would sometimes refer them to other sources for help. Cerar also reported that Vazzaz would yell, but would never be uncontrolled or insulting. Cerar also underlined Vazzaz's media savvy which was helpful given the great discrepancy between the results of the Yugoslav men's and women's programs at the time. Toni Bolkovic (her assistant in the Faculty of Sports at the University of Ljubljana who succeeded her in various capacities) said that Vazzaz was meticulous, orderly, strict, demanding, and determined as a professor and inspired awe in her female students.Her Slovenian students demonstrated higher exam-passing rates than students in the other republics of Yugoslavia.

=== Administrator and academic ===
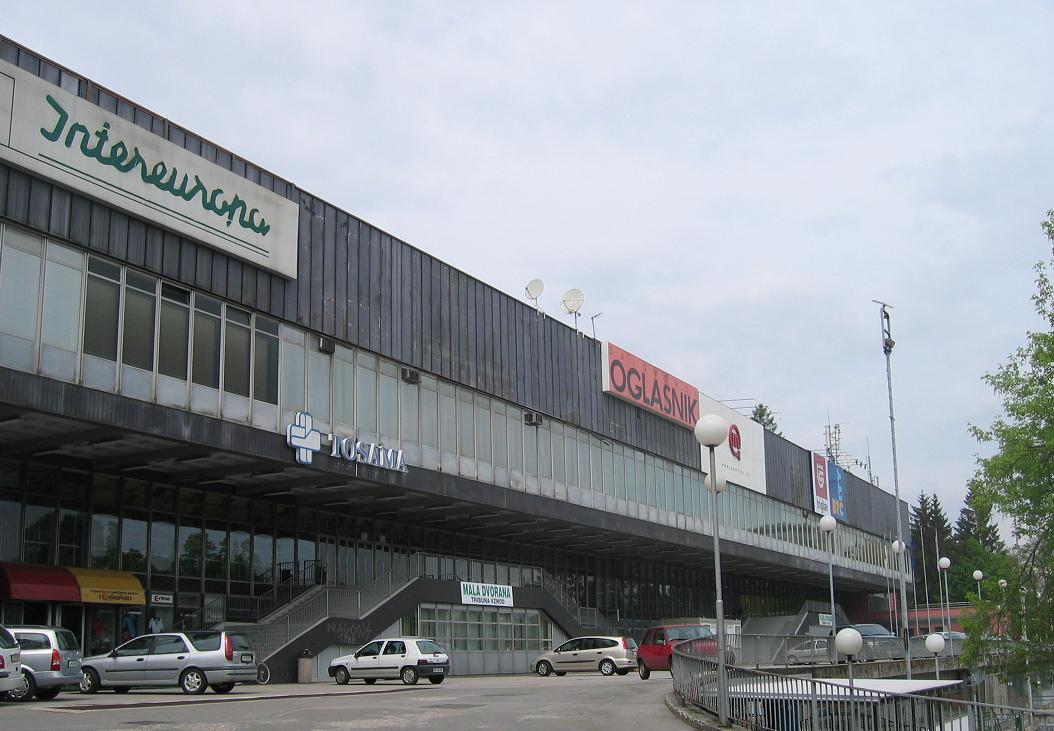
Tivoli Hall was the venue for the 1970 Ljubljana World Championships, for which Vazzaz was one of the chief organizers

When Vazzaz was a teenager and a gifted, actively competing gymnast and Sokol member, she became close to Viktor Murnik, who was very instrumental in the development of gymnastics and physical culture, in general, in Slovenia, and she eventually ended up becoming his closest colleague. At the beginning of her administrative track, she was the Clerk for Physical Education at the Ministry of Education of the People's Republic of Slovenia for a few years starting in 1945, during which time she helped establish the Institute of Physical Education in Ljubljana in 1946. By 1960, the institute was renamed the College of Physical Education. Vazzaz served as a professor there in both artistic gymnastics apparatuses and rhythmic gymnastics. In 1962, she became full professor there, and additionally was Vice-Dean of Student Affairs. She retired from this position in 1979. Other professional association responsibilities she held were being, until 1957, the head of Partizan Slovenije, and the Vice President, in charge of women, of the Slovenian Gymnastics Federation.

When the 1970 Ljubljana World Championships came to Ljubljana, Vazzaz, along with Boris Gregorka, organized those championships. Her responsibilities included being the technical manager of the women's section of the competition.

=== Judge ===
Vazzaz was a FIG brevet judge (judges responsible for judging international and elite competitions) from 1948 to 1979. Among the largest competitions she judged were the 1948 London Olympics, 1952 Helsinki Olympics, 1954 Rome Worlds, and the 1974 Varna Worlds. She also judged rhythmic gymnastics, becoming the first person from her country to be FIG-certified to do so.

=== Developer of rhythmic gymnastics ===
Later in her career, Vazzaz increasingly focused her work on rhythmic gymnastics. In 1966, she and the Gymnastics Association of Slovenia organized the first national championship in rhythmic gymnastics that was tailored to FIG requirements. Since the appearance of rhythmic gymnastics on Yugoslav soil, she has been a member of various committees for rhythmic gymnastics, both at the Gymnastics Association of Slovenia and the Gymnastics Association of Yugoslavia. Among her more prominent monographs related to the subject were A-B-C moderne ritmične gimnastike ("The A-B-Cs of Modern Rhythmic Gymnastics") from 1973 and ABC športne ritmične gimnastike ("The ABCs of the Sport of Rhythmic Gymnastics") from 1981 which was a translation-into-Slovenian of the rules of assessment in rhythmic gymnastics. Among the more successful competitors in rhythmic gymnastics that she coached were Marjeta Kline, Dominika Kacin (who eventually became Nedeljka Pirjevec?), and Ana Lazič.

== Author and documentarian ==
Vazzaz undertook extensive studies and documentation, which included filming, of the 1963 European Championships, 1964 Olympics, and 1970 Worlds, and focused on biomechanical analysis of aspects of the sport. Eventually contributing a total of 68 articles, in 1951 she co-founded and developed a magazine entitled Šport, originally entitled Vodnik, and later Ljudski šport and Telesna kultura which, as of 2006, had been in publication for over 50 years. In addition to the monographs she published on rhythmic gymnastics, other of her more prominent monographs were two, both co-authored with Boris Gregorka, entitled Razvoj telovadnega orodja na Slovenskem ("Development of Gymnastic Tools in Slovenia") from 1984, and Zlata doba slovenskega sokolstva ("The Golden Age of Slovenian Falconry") from 1991. In Vazzaz's efforts to collect and disseminate knowledge on the sport of gymnastics, she collected hundreds of books on gymnastics in several different languages including Czech, Slovenian, Serbian, Bulgarian, Russian, German, French, Italian, English, and Polish, building a library, and donated them to Faculty of Sports at the University of Ljubljana. (As of 2006, those materials remained unprocessed and unused in a faculty basement).

=== 1948 Olympics ===
During her judging experience at the 1948 London Olympics, where in the women's competition Vazzaz judged on the flying rings apparatus and on the team non-apparatus free exercise, she took extensive notes. Among her observations were that the athletes were affected by the protractedness of the competition, sometimes having to wait an hour long to perform their exercises, and which caused the competition to extend well into the evening. She also noted that the equipment was not properly inspected beforehand, routines were sometimes interrupted by announcements on the intercom, and sometimes, the entire evening sessions were interrupted. She also noted that transportation was not well-provided for. Her complaints about the food (which included the ability to get any warm food) found agreement with one of her compatriots, Milica Rožman, (who was an alternate at these games and a fully-contributing competitor for her Yugoslav team at the next Olympics in Helsinki in 1952). Vazzaz also noted that the results were not easily and readily available, and sometimes, quick self-transcription from the source was all that could be had. When it came to her assessments of the other judges, in general, she noted that lack of real-world experience and knowledge of the competitors existed in the older judges who only knew theory on paper. Vazzaz also asserted that there was favoritism in judging, which sometimes manifested in more than a 2-point difference being awarded by different judges for the same performance.

Vazzaz also detailed her evaluations of the various teams at these games (only team medals were awarded). About the gold medal-winning Czechoslovak team, she praised the team's uniformity, loveliness, femininity, modesty, solidity in work, precision, versatility, self-discipline, and solid competitiveness. She noted that they were especially good on flying rings where their on-apparatus posture was gorgeous, and they had big somersault dismounts with safe landings. In summary, she asserted that they deservedly took first place. Her assessment of the silver medal-winning Hungarian team, who were greatly disappointed to lose because they were expected to be the champions, included that their dismounts from rings were much less safe than that of the Czechoslovak team, but were very good on beam and surpassed the Czechoslovak team there to become the highest-scoring team on that apparatus (in both compulsory and voluntary segments of the competition). An additional criticism of hers was that the Hungarians were not uniform enough, their older competitors not being as competitive as their younger ones who looked very promising. About the bronze medal-winning team from the US, she noted that they were a younger group of contestants, and stood out because of their unique stature, being wide at the shoulders, narrow at the hips, but with too much facial make-up. She stated that the USA team had strong hands, which saved them when they did not execute well otherwise. In particular, she noted that on the flying rings apparatus, they got lower scores than they deserved, in relation to subsequently competing teams, because they were first up on the apparatus and judging rules had not been made sufficiently clear.

Among the non-medaling teams at these games, she noted of the 5th-place (out of 11) team from the Netherlands, team champions at the first women's gymnastics competition at the Olympics in 1928, (and one of only two thus, such far), she stated that although they were older and did not look like good contestants, they rightly occupied 2nd place on the team free exercise with hand apparatus (balls), showing considerable knowledge, loveliness, and sense of performance. Among the 8th-place Italian team, Vazzaz singled out Laura Micheli, who at only 16 or 17 (especially young for a competitor for this time), was the third-highest scorer, overall, among the competitive field of over 80 contestants, scoring much higher than any of her teammates. Vazzaz also singled out the Italian team's work on the optional segment of the beam exercises where they showed some original elements.

== Personal life ==
Jelica Vazzaz and Boris Gregorka in later life

Vazzaz's close working-relationship with the married Boris Gregorka eventually resulted in their relationship becoming more than professional. This was long-standing, openly acknowledged, and was tolerated by Boris's wife, Njune. In addition to the many capacities in which she worked professionally within the competitive aspects of the sport of gymnastics, her enthusiasm spilled over into providing opportunities for recreational gymnastics. She developed her own ideas for family-based gymnastics, offering classes designed specifically for children under the age of 3, and including both their mothers and fathers. She also developed and offered a program named “Skokice” which was targeted to older people ranging in age from their early 50s to over 90, and she offered these classes until she was nearly 90 years old.

Vazzaz stayed active throughout her entire life. Well into her 80s, she still got up regularly at 5:30 and read the daily newspaper. She continued to work diligently organizing all of her effects and documents in her archives, and actively stayed in communication with many of her previous students. She also drove regularly throughout her 80s, worked crossword puzzles, smoked a pack of cigarettes a day, and went to bed only at 1 am. Not including her daytime naps, she only slept 3 or 4 hours at night. On 15 June 2007, she died after a "serious illness" at the age of 92. She was very fond of travelling and visited such European countries as Bulgaria, France, Monaco, and Spain, and, more broadly, she travelled to China, India, Nepal, Russia, and parts of Africa as well. She particularly liked Finland and their saunas and was instrumental in introducing them to Slovenia.

Every time fellow Yugoslav 1924 Olympic Gymnastics All-Around Champion Leon Štukelj came to Ljubljana, he first stopped to see Gregorka, then they both talked with Vazzaz.

== Legacy ==
In her obituary, Slovenian newspaper Delo called Vazzaz the most important woman of physical culture in Slovenia and a Slovenian sports legend.

=== Honors and awards ===
The following are some of the honors and awards that were bestowed upon Vazzaz during her lifetime:

- State decoration: Order of Merit for the People III. degrees – Presidium of the National Assembly of the Federal People's Republic of Yugoslavia – Belgrade (1951)
- Bloudek Award for professional work – Association for Physical Culture of Slovenia (the first woman honored) (1965)
- Golden Plaque – Ljubljana City of Heroes – City Assembly of Ljubljana (1977)
- National decoration: Order of The Red Flag for Special Merits and Achievements in Socialist State Building - SFR Yugoslavia, President of the Republic (1979)
- Marjan Rožanec Lifetime Achievement Award in the field of sports for amateur workers – City Assembly of Ljubljana (1992)
- ŠD Narodni dom Ljubljana – Acknowledgment: Genera of Gymnasts of the Sports Association ND, Ljubljana (1996)
- Lifetime Achievement Award as an Amateur Worker – Sports Association Ljubljana (2000)
- Honorary gold medallion – Faculty of Sports in Ljubljana – 40th anniversary higher education (2001)

Additionally, in 2006, she was awarded with the Honorary Charter of Sports Associations, the highest award of the Olympic Committee of Slovenia.
