= Zdenka Cerar =

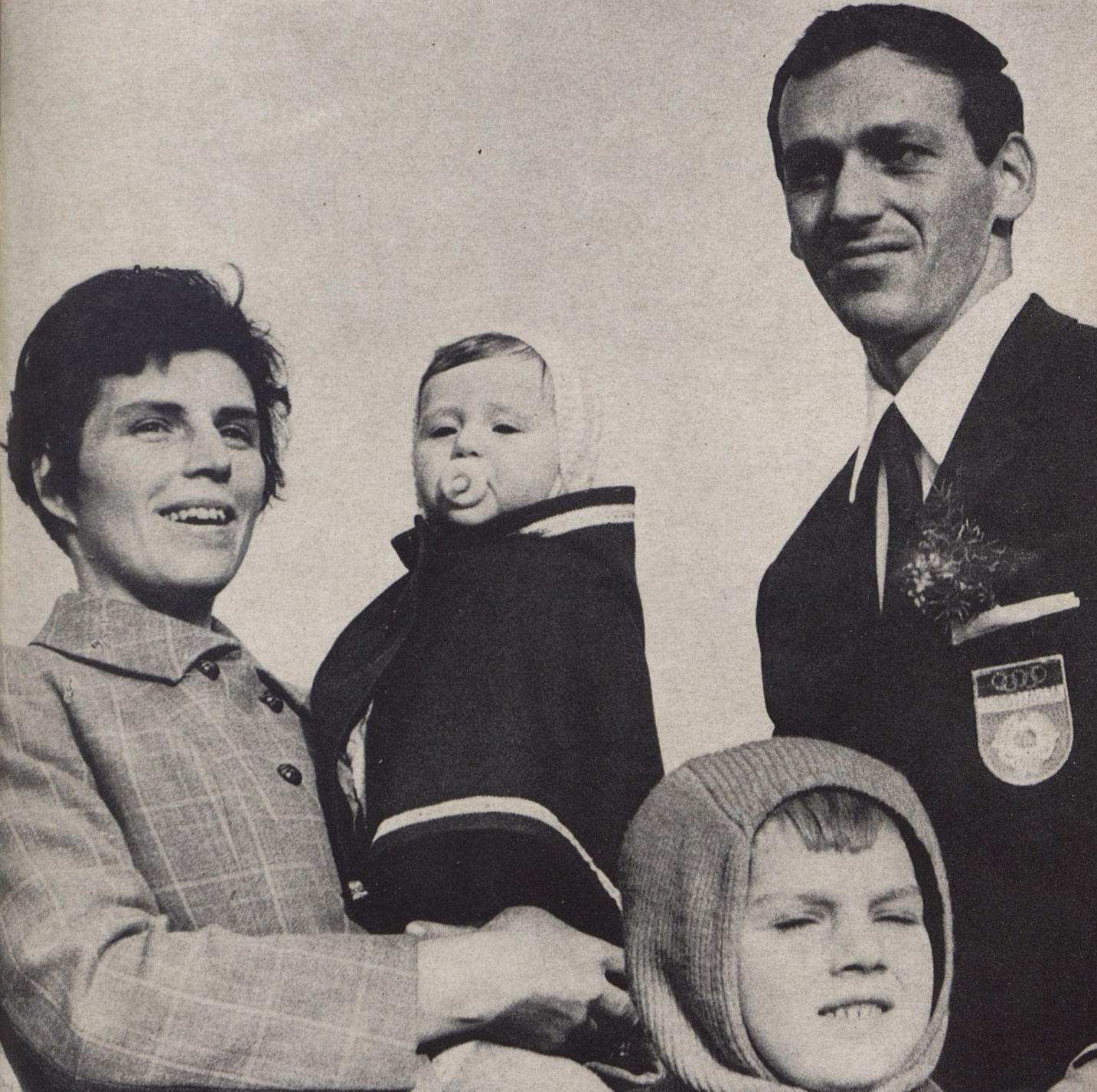
- Zdenka Cerar, with her husband Miroslav Cerar, and family, c. 1968

Personal information
- Full name: Zdenka Prusnik-Cerar
- Born: September 7, 1941 Ljubljana, Kingdom of Italy
- Died: 28 August 2013 (aged 71) Grosuplje, Slovenia

Gymnastics career
- Discipline: Women's artistic gymnastics
- Country represented: Yugoslavia/Slovenia
- Head coaches: Jelica Vazzaz, Milica Rožman
- Former coach: Vida Gerbec

Zdenka Prusnik-Cerar (7 September 1941 – 28 August 2013) was a Slovenian gymnast who competed for Yugoslavia at the 1962 World Artistic Gymnastics Championships. She had a very prominent political career, being appointed, in 1999, the General State Prosecutor in the National Assembly of Slovenia and, later in 2005, the Minister of Justice of Slovenia. She was the wife of European, World, and Olympic individual champion gymnast Miroslav Cerar and the mother of Miro Cerar, Prime Minister of Slovenia in 2014–2018.
