= Stoch =

Stoch (Polish pronunciation: [ˈstɔx]) is a surname of West Slavic origin. It may refer to:

- Amy Stoch (born 1958), American actress (credited as Amy Stock or Amy Stock-Poynton)
- Andreas Stoch (born 1969), German politician
- Kamil Stoch (born 1987), Polish ski jumper
- Miroslav Stoch (born 1989), Slovak association footballer

== See also ==
- Stochov
- Butters Stotch
