= Walter Beck =

Walter Beck may refer to:

- Boom-Boom Beck (Walter William Beck, 1904–1987), American pitcher in Major League Baseball
- Walter Beck (gymnast) (1907–1992), Swiss gymnast
