= Družstevná pri Hornáde =

Družstevná pri Hornáde Družstevná pri Hornáde
- Municipality
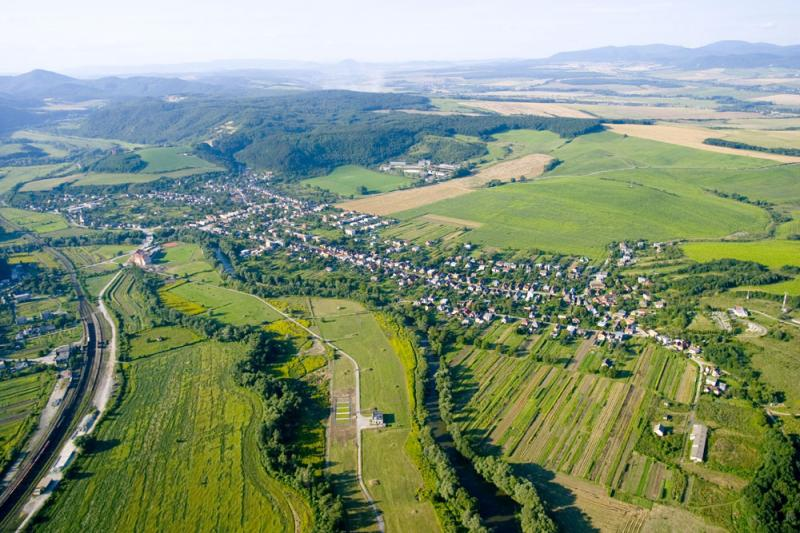
- Aerial view

- Flag

- Location of Družstevná pri Hornáde in the Košice Region Location of Družstevná pri Hornáde in Slovakia
- Coordinates: 48.80°N 21.25°E
- Country: Slovakia
- Region: Košice Region
- District: Košice-okolie District
- First mentioned: 1960

Area
  - Total: 16.40 km^{2} (6.33 sq mi)
- Elevation: 226 m (741 ft)

Population (2025)
  - Total: 2,902
- Time zone: UTC+1 (CET)
  - Summer (DST): UTC+2 (CEST)
- Postal code: 443 1
- Area code: +421 55
- Vehicle registration plate (until 2022): KS
- Website: www.druzstevna.sk

Družstevná pri Hornáde is a village and municipality of the Košice-okolie District, located in the Kosice Region of eastern Slovakia.

== Etymology ==
The name is derived from "Jednotné roľnícke družstvo", which was a type of agricultural cooperative that was common during the Soviet era.

== Geography ==
The municipality lies at an altitude of 226 metres (741 ft) and covers an area of 16.40 km^{2} (6.33 sq mi) (2025).

== History ==
Družstevná pri Hornáde was originally 3 villages: Malá Vieska, Kostoľany nad Hornádom and Tepličany. They were combined into one administrative area during the Soviet era. Kostoľany nad Hornádom became an independent municipality in 2003.

== Geography ==
The River Hornád flows through the village.

== Population ==
Population statistic (10 years)
Year	1995	2005	2015	2025
Count	3049	2297	2701	2902
Difference		−24.66%	+17.58%	+7.44%

Population statistic
Year	2024	2025
Count	2852	2902
Difference		+1.75%

It has a population of 2902 people (31 December 2025).

=== Ethnicity ===
Census 2021 (1+ %)
Ethnicity	Number	Fraction
Slovak	2568	92.9%
Romani	236	8.53%
Not found out	146	5.28%
Total	2764	

In year 2021 was 2764 people by ethnicity 2568 as Slovak, 236 as Romani, 146 as Not found out, 20 as Czech, 19 as Rusyn, 6 as Other, 5 as Hungarian, 5 as French, 4 as Polish, 2 as Russian, 1 as Jewish, 1 as Ukrainian, 1 as Moravian and 1 as Canadian.

Note on population: The difference values of population numbers in the table "Population statistic" and in the sections "Ethnicity" & "Religion" is caused by the use of various statistical methods.

=== Religion ===
Census 2021 (1+ %)
Religion	Number	Fraction
Roman Catholic Church	2010	72.72%
None	376	13.6%
Not found out	138	4.99%
Evangelical Church	105	3.8%
Greek Catholic Church	81	2.93%
Total	2764	

In year 2021 was 2764 people by religion 2010 from Roman Catholic Church, 376 from None, 138 from Not found out, 105 from Evangelical Church, 81 from Greek Catholic Church, 12 from Eastern Orthodox Church, 9 from Calvinist Church, 7 from Other, 7 from Apostolic Church, 7 from Ad hoc movements, 5 from Other and not ascertained christian church, 2 from Jehovah's Witnesses, 2 from Christian Congregations in Slovakia, 1 from New Apostolic Church, 1 from Seventh-day Adventist Church and 1 from Church of Jesus Christ of Latter-day Saints.

== Genealogical resources ==
The records for genealogical research are available at the state archive "Statny Archiv in Kosice, Slovakia"

== See also ==
- List of municipalities and towns in Slovakia
