= Božena Dobešová =

Czech gymnast

- Born: 2 October 1914 Stochov, Bohemia, Austria-Hungary
- Died: 28 November 1990 (aged 76) Bílovice nad Svitavou, Czechoslovakia

Gymnastics career
- Discipline: Women's artistic gymnastics
- Country represented: Czechoslovakia
Medal record
Olympic Games
Silver medal – second place	1936 Berlin	Team
World Championships
Gold medal – first place	1938 Prague	Team
Silver medal – second place	1938 Prague	Uneven Bars
Bronze medal – third place	1938 Prague	Vault

Božena Dobešová (2 October 1914 – 28 November 1990) was a Czech gymnast who competed for Czechoslovakia in the 1936 Summer Olympics.

She was born on 2 October 1914 in Stochov. In 1936, she won the silver Olympic medal as member of the Czechoslovak gymnastics team. Her career was stopped by the occupation of Czechoslovakia (1938–1945). After finishing her active career, she worked as a coach and later as a sports official. She died on 28 November 1990 in Bílovice nad Svitavou.
