= Stredoslovenská energetika =

Stredoslovenská energetika, a.s.
- Industry: Electricity
- Headquarters: Žilina, Slovakia
- Revenue: 1,825,000,000 (2023)
- Net income: 22,000,000 (2023)
- Number of employees: 370 (2023)
- Website: www.sse.sk

Stredoslovenská energetika, a.s. (SSE) is an electric utility company based in Žilina, Slovakia. It is second largest electricity distributor in Slovakia, which serves the Žilina Region, Banská Bystrica Region and in a part of the Trenčín Region, where it delivers and distributes electricity to circa 700,000 customers - businesses and households. SSE's shareholding structure is 51.00% Government of Slovakia and 49.00% Energetický a průmyslový holding (EPH).

In May 2013 Électricité de France (EDF) confirmed that it would sell its 49% stake in SSE to Energetický a průmyslový holding (EPH) for about €400 million.

== See also ==
- Západoslovenská energetika
- Východoslovenská energetika

== Sources ==
http://www.bne.eu/story4987/EDF_follows_the_beaten_track_out_of_Slovakia
