= Račice-Pístovice =

- Municipality
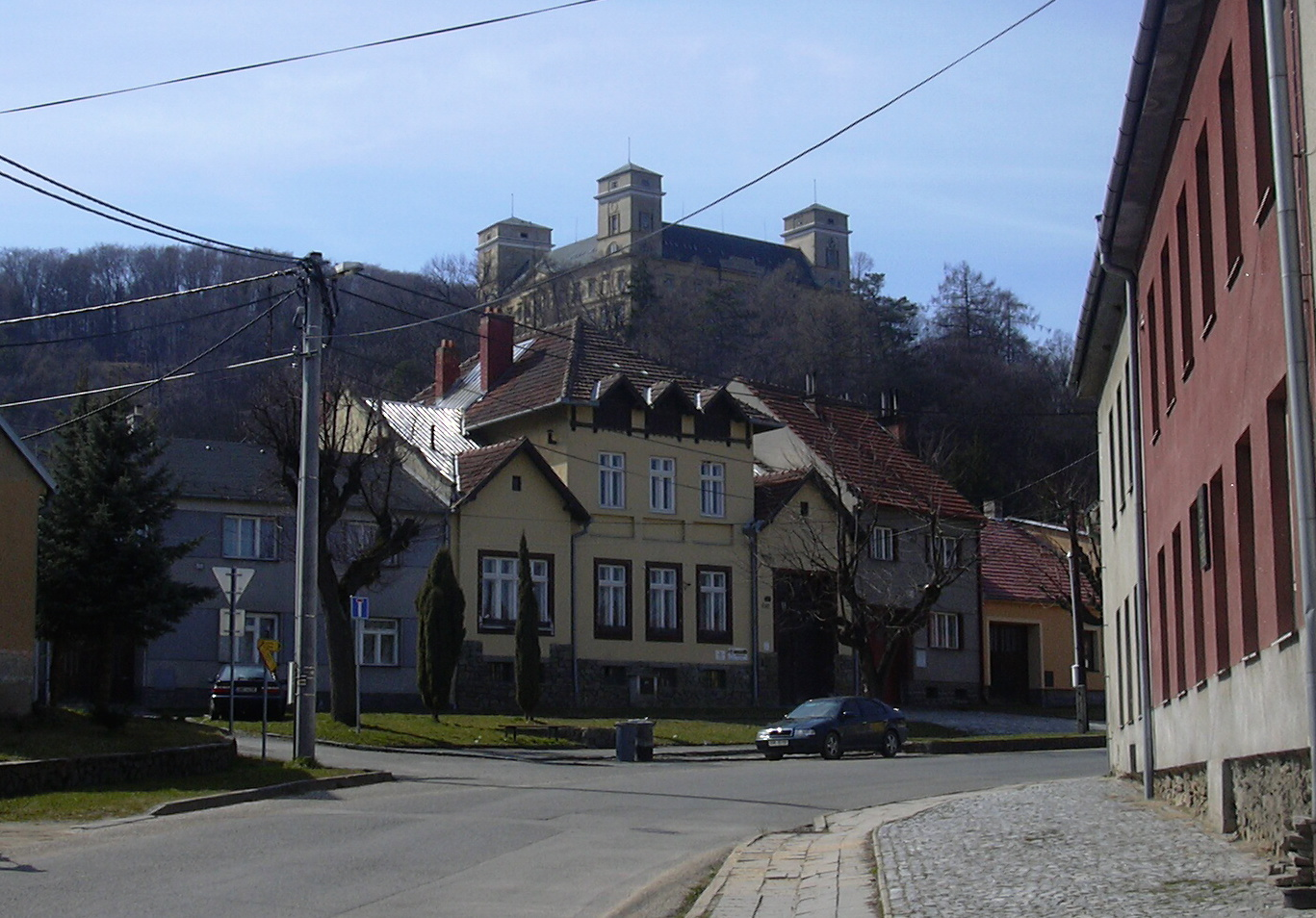
- Račice Castle

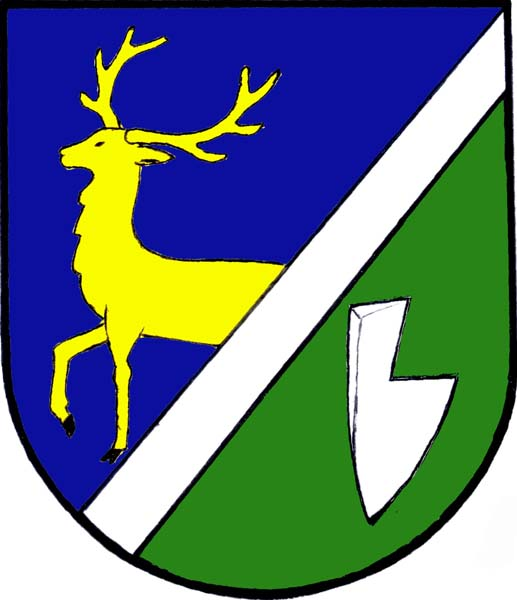
- Flag Coat of arms

- Location in the Czech Republic
- Coordinates: 49°16′33″N 16°52′22″E
- Country: Czech Republic
- Region: South Moravian
- District: Vyškov
- First mentioned: 1227

Area
  - Total: 18.86 km^{2} (7.28 sq mi)
- Elevation: 340 m (1,120 ft)

Population (2026-01-01)
  - Total: 1,369
  - Density: 72.59/km^{2} (188.0/sq mi)
- Time zone: UTC+1 (CET)
  - Summer (DST): UTC+2 (CEST)
- Postal code: 683 05
- Website: www.racice-pistovice.cz

Račice-Pístovice is a municipality in Vyškov District in the South Moravian Region of the Czech Republic. It has about 1,400 inhabitants.

Račice-Pístovice lies approximately 9 kilometres (6 mi) west of Vyškov, 21 km (13 mi) north-east of Brno, and 199 km (124 mi) south-east of Prague.

== Administrative division ==
Račice-Pístovice consists of two municipal parts (in brackets population according to the 2021 census):

- Račice (683)
- Pístovice (552)

== History ==
The first written mention about Račice is from 1227 and about Pístovice is from 1375. Račice and Pístovice were merged into one municipality in 1960.

== Demographics ==
Historical population
Year	Pop.	±%
1869	1,291	—
1880	1,343	+4.0%
1890	1,452	+8.1%
1900	1,369	−5.7%
1910	1,455	+6.3%
1921	1,383	−4.9%
1930	1,407	+1.7%
1950	1,347	−4.3%
1961	1,399	+3.9%
1970	1,279	−8.6%
1980	1,147	−10.3%
1991	1,000	−12.8%
2001	1,018	+1.8%
2011	1,107	+8.7%
2021	1,235	+11.6%
Source: Censuses

== Notable people ==
- Alois Hudec (1908–1997), gymnast, Olympic champion
