= Albert Bachmann (gymnast) =

Swiss artistic gymnast (1906–1990)

- Born: 8 November 1906
- Died: 16 January 1990 (aged 83)

Gymnastics career
- Discipline: Men's artistic gymnastics
- Country represented: Switzerland
Medal record
Men's artistic gymnastics
Representing Switzerland
Olympic Games
Silver medal – second place	1936 Berlin	Team
Bronze medal – third place	1936 Berlin	Pommel horse
World Championships
Silver medal – second place	1938 Prague	Team

Albert Bachmann (8 November 1906 – 16 January 1990) was a Swiss gymnast who competed in the 1936 Summer Olympics.
