= Miroslav Forte =

Slovenian gymnast (1911–1942)

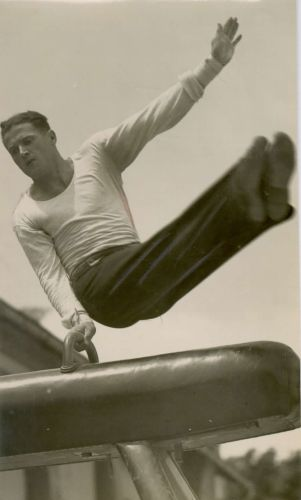
- Forte in 1938

Personal information
- Born: 24 October 1911 Trbovlje, Austria-Hungary
- Died: February 1942 (aged 30)
- Height: 1.68 m (5 ft 6 in)

Gymnastics career
- Discipline: Men's artistic gymnastics
- Country represented: Yugoslavia
- Club: Ljubljanski Sokol

Miroslav Forte (24 October 1911 – February 1942) was a Slovenian gymnast. He competed in eight events at the 1936 Summer Olympics. He was killed in action during World War II.
