= Východoslovenská energetika =

Východoslovenská energetika, a.s.
- Industry: Electricity
- Headquarters: Košice, Slovakia
- Website: www.vse.sk

Východoslovenská energetika, a.s. (VSE) is an electric utility company based in Košice, Slovakia. It is the third largest electricity distributor in the Slovakia, which serves the Košice Region and Prešov Region, where it delivers and distributes electricity to circa 500,000 customers – businesses and households.

Since 2003, Východoslovenská energetika has been part of a large European energy company called Innogy, which currently supplies energy to approximately 16 million electricity consumers and 7 million gas customers in 11 European countries.

== See also ==
- Západoslovenská energetika
- Stredoslovenská energetika
