= Walter Beck (gymnast) =

Swiss gymnast

- Born: 20 November 1907
- Died: 1992

Gymnastics career
- Discipline: Men's artistic gymnastics
- Country represented: Switzerland
Medal record
Men's gymnastics
Representing Switzerland
Olympic Games
Silver medal – second place	1936 Berlin	Team
World Championships
Silver medal – second place	1938 Prague	Team
Silver medal – second place	1938 Prague	Vault
Bronze medal – third place	1938 Prague	Horizontal bar

Walter Beck (20 November 1907 – 1992) was a Swiss gymnast who competed in the 1936 Summer Olympics. Additionally, he competed at the 1938 World Artistic Gymnastics Championships where he helped his Swiss team to silver, and won an individual silver medal on the vault apparatus and an individual bronze medal on the horizontal bar apparatus.
