= Milica Rožman =

Slovenian gymnast (born 1932)

- Full name: Milica Rožman - Šlibar
- Born: August 5, 1932 Ljubljana, Kingdom of Yugoslavia

Gymnastics career
- Discipline: Women's artistic gymnastics
- Former countries represented: Yugoslavian
- Head coach: none (self)
- Assistant coaches: Boris Gregorka, Jelica Vazzaz

Milica Rožman-Šlibar (born 1932) is a Slovenian-Yugoslavian gymnast. She competed in seven events at the 1952 Summer Olympics. Previously, she attended the 1948 Olympics as a team reserve member, although she did not compete. Additionally, she competed at the 1950 World Championships, where she helped her team to a 4th-place finish.
