= Armand Walter =

French gymnast

- Born: 5 April 1908 Pfastatt, France
- Died: 11 July 1995 (aged 87) Belfort, France

Gymnastics career
- Discipline: Men's artistic gymnastics
- Country represented: France
- Gym: Société de Gymnastique 1860 Guebwiller

Armand Walter (5 April 1908 – 11 July 1995) was a French gymnast. He competed in eight events at the 1936 Summer Olympics.
