= Lidija Rupnik =

Slovenian gymnast (1915–2003)

Personal information
- Full name: Lidija Rupnik – Šifrer
- Born: 20 February 1915 Trieste, Austria-Hungary
- Died: 11 November 2003 (aged 88) Ljubljana, Slovenia

Gymnastics career
- Discipline: Women's artistic gymnastics
- Country represented: Yugoslavia
Medal record
Representing Yugoslavia
World Championships
Silver medal – second place	1938 Prague	Team

Lidija Rupnik (20 February 1915 – 2003) was a Slovenian gymnast. She competed in the women's artistic team all-around event at the 1936 Summer Olympics. Additionally, she competed at the 1938 World Championships where she placed 7th in the individual all-around competition and led her team in scoring to win the team silver medal.
