= Willy Klein =

Luxembourgish gymnast (1912–2004)

- Born: 11 October 1912 Dudelange, Luxembourg
- Died: 15 July 2004 (aged 91) Dudelange, Luxembourg

Gymnastics career
- Discipline: Men's artistic gymnastics
- Country represented: Luxembourg

Willy Klein (11 October 1912 – 15 July 2004) was a Luxembourgish gymnast. He competed in eight events at the 1936 Summer Olympics, where his best result was placing 12th in the Men's Team All-Around event.
