= Brestovany =

- Municipality
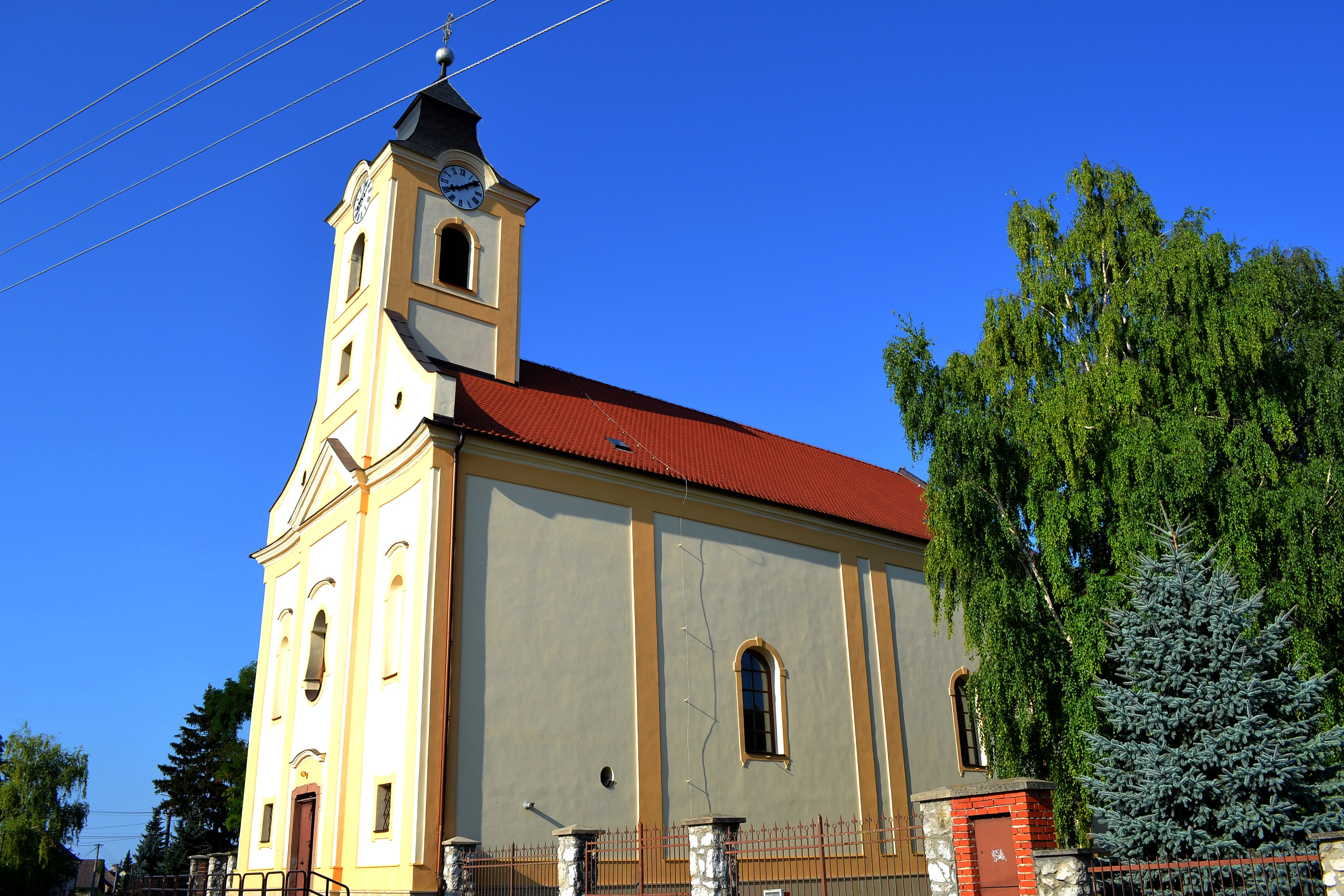

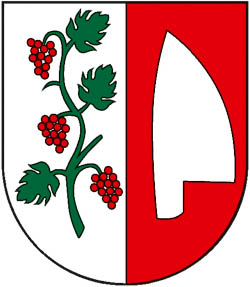
- Flag Coat of arms

- Location of Brestovany in the Trnava Region Location of Brestovany in Slovakia
- Coordinates: 48.38°N 17.68°E
- Country: Slovakia
- Region: Trnava Region
- District: Trnava District
- First mentioned: 1113

Area
  - Total: 16.36 km^{2} (6.32 sq mi)
- Elevation: 136 m (446 ft)

Population (2025)
  - Total: 2,496
- Time zone: UTC+1 (CET)
  - Summer (DST): UTC+2 (CEST)
- Postal code: 919 27
- Area code: +421 33
- Vehicle registration plate (until 2022): TT
- Website: www.brestovany.sk

Brestovany (Hungarian: Bresztovány) is a municipality in the Trnava District of the Trnava region of Slovakia, with a population of about 2,000 inhabitants. The name of the village is likely derived from the Slovak word brest, meaning elm, a tree which used to be common in the area.

== Geography ==
The municipality lies at an altitude of 136 metres (446 ft) and covers an area of 16.36 km^{2} (6.32 sq mi) (2025).

== History ==
The first recorded mention of Brestovany dates back to 1113 in a document known as the Zoborská listina, where it is referred to as Bristem. The village has faced numerous challenges throughout its history, including a Tatars invasion in 1241 and a conquest by the Czech army in 1271. In 1280, Brestovany became hereditary property of the town of Trnava, making its inhabitants serfs until the abolition of serfdom in 1848. The village was plundered and burned by the Ottoman Empire in 1533.

In the 18th century, two significant religious structures were built in Brestovany: the Chapel of Saint Martin and the Church of Saint John the Baptist. The village suffered severe fires in 1811 and 1818, which destroyed large parts of it. By 1824, Brestovany belonged to Polish count Jozef Saryusz Zamoyski, who built a neoclassical mansion in the village, now housing a primary school. The mansion later became the property of another Polish noble, Albert Wielopolski, both of whom are buried in the local cemetery.

== Archaeology ==
In July 2022, archaeologists from the Monuments Board of Trnava and the Western Slovakia Museum announced the discovery of a 4,000-year-old female grave. The skeleton was found in a curled position on her left side with jewels from the Early Bronze Age Nitra culture containing two willow-shaped earrings, bone beads, a copper bracelet.

== Population ==
Population statistic (10 years)
Year	1995	2005	2015	2025
Count	1880	2062	2589	2496
Difference		+9.68%	+25.55%	−3.59%

Population statistic
Year	2024	2025
Count	2507	2496
Difference		−0.43%

It has a population of 2496 people (31 December 2025).

=== Ethnicity ===
Census 2021 (1+ %)
Ethnicity	Number	Fraction
Slovak	2403	91.64%
Not found out	210	8%
Total	2622	

In year 2021 was 2622 people by ethnicity 2403 as Slovak, 210 as Not found out, 16 as Czech, 5 as Hungarian, 4 as Ukrainian, 3 as Other, 2 as Vietnamese, 2 as Romani, 2 as Rusyn, 2 as Romanian, 2 as Moravian, 1 as Italian, 1 as Polish, 1 as German, 1 as Croatian and 1 as Albanian.

Note on population: The difference values of population numbers in the table "Population statistic" and in the sections "Ethnicity" & "Religion" is caused by the use of various statistical methods.

=== Religion ===
Census 2021 (1+ %)
Religion	Number	Fraction
Roman Catholic Church	1790	68.27%
None	527	20.1%
Not found out	217	8.28%
Total	2622	

In year 2021 was 2622 people by religion 1790 from Roman Catholic Church, 527 from None, 217 from Not found out, 23 from Evangelical Church, 15 from Ad hoc movements, 12 from Greek Catholic Church, 8 from Other, 7 from Christian Congregations in Slovakia, 5 from Other and not ascertained christian church, 4 from Calvinist Church, 3 from Eastern Orthodox Church, 3 from Paganism and natural spirituality, 2 from Church of the Brethren, 2 from Seventh-day Adventist Church, 1 from Jewish community, 1 from United Methodist Church, 1 from Buddhism and 1 from Bahá'i Community.

== Culture and social life ==
There are several remarkable historic buildings in Brestovany: the baroque Chapel of Saint Martin (1767), the baroque Church of Saint John the Baptist (1772) and the neoclassical manor house with a large park built in 1826. The village's organizations include a hunters' association, a carrier-pigeon breeders society, a volunteer fire brigade, a sports club and several choirs.

== Notable residents ==
Ľudmila Zamoyska-Gizická (1829 – 1889)– music composer, pianist

Jožo Nižnánsky (1903 – 1976) – writer, journalist, publicist, author of novel Čachtická pani (1932)

František Nižnánsky (1911- 1967) – Brother of Jožo Nižnánsky, one of founders of modern veterinary science in Slovakia

František Hrušovský (1903 – 1956) – historian, publicist

== See also ==
- List of municipalities and towns in Slovakia

== Genealogical resources ==
The records for genealogical research are available at the state archive "Statny Archiv in Bratislava, Slovakia"

- Roman Catholic church records (births/marriages/deaths): 1711-1897 (parish A)
- Lutheran church records (births/marriages/deaths): 1666-1895 (parish B)
