= Marta Pustišek =

Slovenian gymnast (1917–1966)

- Marta Pustišek

Personal information
- Full name: Marta Pustišek
- Born: 21 February 1917 Ljubljana, Austria-Hungary
- Died: 2 August 1966 (aged 49) Ljubljana, Yugoslavia

Gymnastics career
- Discipline: Women's artistic gymnastics
- Country represented: Yugoslavia /Slovenia
- Head coach: Viktor Murnik
Medal record
Representing Yugoslavia
World Championships
Silver medal – second place	1938 Prague	Team

Marta Pustišek (21 February 1917 – 2 August 1966) was a Slovenian gymnast. She competed for Yugoslavia at the women's artistic team all-around event at the 1936 Summer Olympics as well as at the 1938 World Championships where she helped her team to the silver medal.
