= Jože Vadnov =

Slovenian gymnast

- Born: 5 July 1912 Ljubljana, Austria-Hungary
- Died: 20 September 1996 (aged 84) Ljubljana, Slovenia

Gymnastics career
- Discipline: Men's artistic gymnastics
- Country represented: Kingdom of Yugoslavia
- Club: Ljubljanski Sokol

Jože Vadnov (5 July 1912 – 20 September 1996) was a Slovenian gymnast. He competed in eight events at the 1936 Summer Olympics.
