= Alois Hudec =

Czechoslovak gymnast

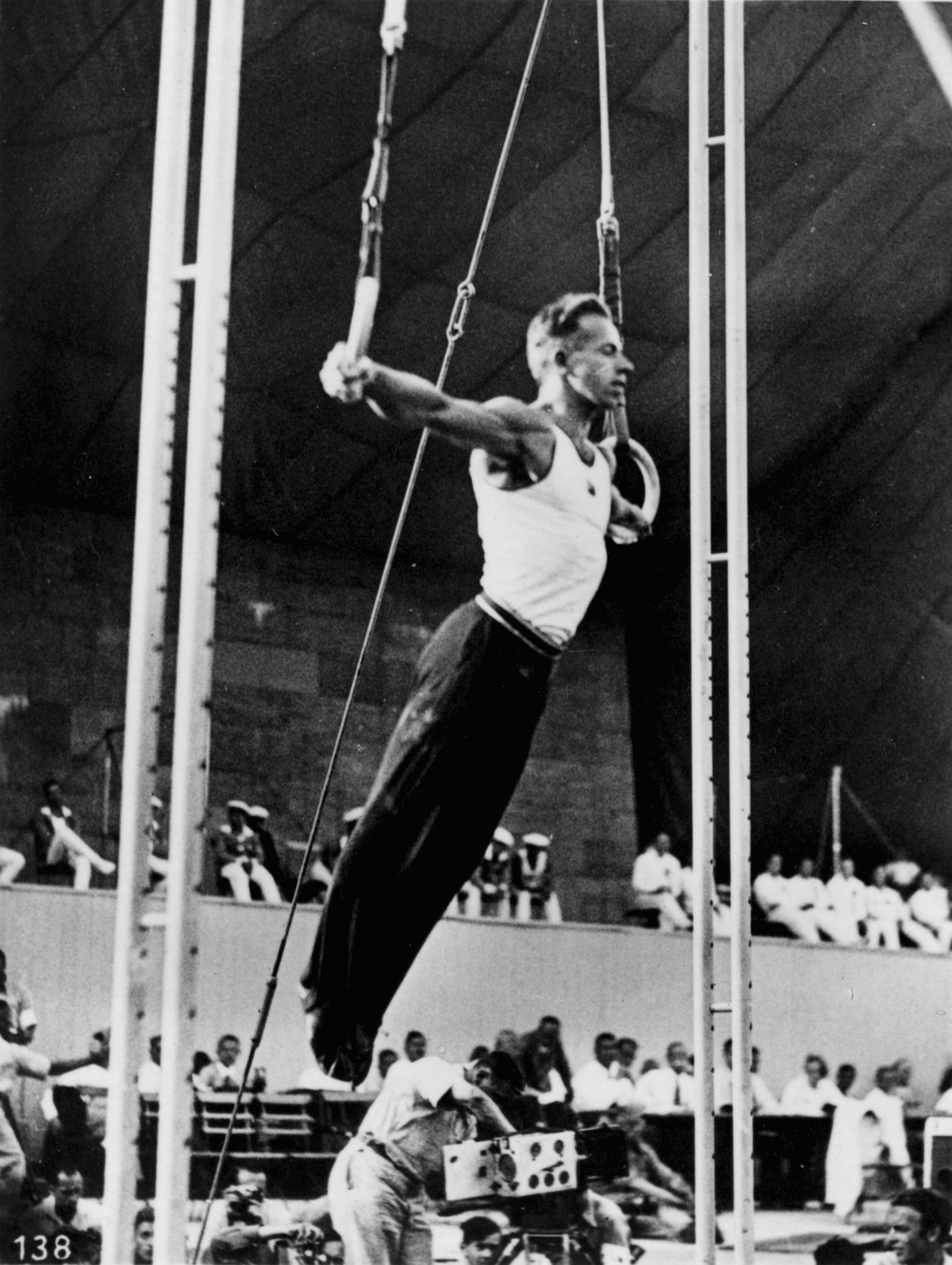
- Alois Hudec, displaying his mastery on the Still Rings apparatus c. 1931

Personal information
- Born: 12 July 1908 Račice, Austria-Hungary
- Died: 23 January 1997 (aged 88) Prague, Czech Republic

Gymnastics career
- Discipline: Men's artistic gymnastics
- Country represented: Czechoslovakia
Medal record
Olympic Games
Gold medal – first place	1936 Berlin	Rings
World Championships
Gold medal – first place	1931 Paris	All-Around
Gold medal – first place	1931 Paris	Floor Exercise
Gold medal – first place	1931 Paris	Rings
Gold medal – first place	1934 Budapest	Rings
Gold medal – first place	1938 Prague	Team
Gold medal – first place	1938 Prague	Rings
Silver medal – second place	1938 Prague	Floor
Silver medal – second place	1938 Prague	Parallel Bars
Silver medal – second place	1938 Prague	Horizontal Bar
Silver medal – second place	1934 Budapest	Team

Alois Hudec (12 July 1908 – 23 January 1997) was a Czechoslovak gymnast and an individual World and Olympic Champion in the sport.

He competed for Czechoslovakia at the 1936 Summer Olympics in Berlin, where he received a gold medal in rings. Part of his performance there is recorded in an 85-second shot in Leni Riefenstahl's film Olympia. He also competed at three World Championships in a row (1931, 1934, 1938) where he won the rings title every time.

Hudec also bears another particular distinction within the annals of the history of the sport. Although the 1931 World Artistic Gymnastics Championships often seem to go ignored by various authorities within the sport, the FIG, in their 125-Year Anniversary Publication, refers to them as the "First Artistic Men's World Championships". As he became the overall World All-Around Champion at those games, according to some authorities, Hudec could be considered the first-ever World All-Around Champion in the sport of Men's Artistic Gymnastics.
