= Janez Pristov =

Slovenian gymnast

- Born: 10 January 1907 Gorizia, Austria-Hungary
- Died: July 2000 (aged 93) Ljubljana, Slovenia
- Height: 1.82 m (6 ft 0 in)

Gymnastics career
- Discipline: Men's artistic gymnastics
- Country represented: Kingdom of Yugoslavia
- Club: Sokolskog društva Jesenice

Janez Pristov (10 January 1907 – July 2000) was a Slovenian gymnast. He competed in eight events at the 1936 Summer Olympics.
