= Západoslovenská energetika =

Slovakian electric utility

Západoslovenská energetika, a.s.
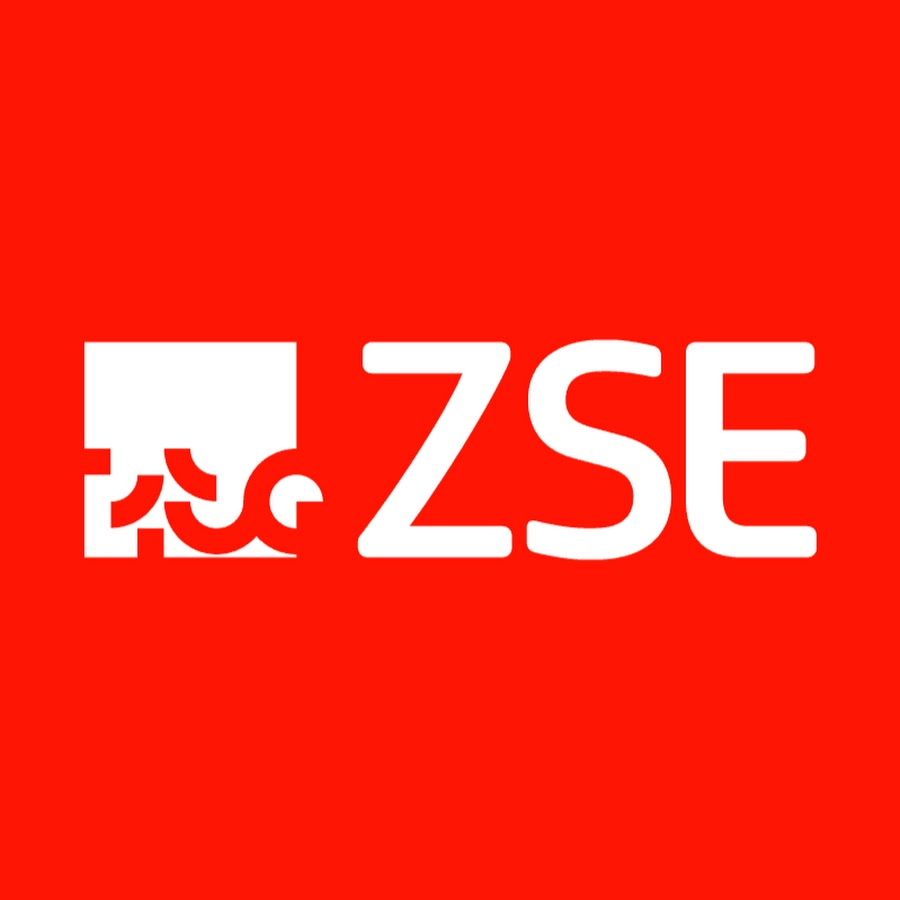
- Company type: joint stock company
- Industry: Electricity
- Founder: National Property Fund (FNM)
- Headquarters: Čulenova 6; 816 47 Bratislava, Slovakia
- Area served: Slovakia
- Key people: Markus Kaune; Chairman of the Board of Directors and CEO
- Owner: 51% Ministry of Economy of the Slovak Republic; 39% E.ON Slovensko, a.s. 10% E.ON Beteiligungen GmbH
- Subsidiaries: ZSE Energia, a. s. Západoslovenská distribučná, a.s.
- Website: www.zse.sk

Západoslovenská energetika, a.s. (ZSE) is a Slovak utility company based in Bratislava. Its main objective is to sell and supply electricity to end customers. In 2002 it became a member of the E.ON Group. On 1 July 2007, electricity distribution and trade became independent services provided by respective subsidiaries. Západoslovenská distribučná, a.s. and ZSE Energia, a.s., are 100% subsidiaries of ZSE.

== History ==
The first power plant in Slovakia launched its operation in 1884 in the S. Ludwig mill in Bratislava. The establishing General Meeting of Západoslovenská elektrárna took place on 20 December 1921. The company acquired its legal form on 1 June 1922. It was transformed into a joint-stock company in 2001 within the preparations for privatisation. Representatives of the Slovak government and the German E.ON Energie Group based in Munich signed an agreement on transferring a 49% share in ZSE to E.ON Energie at a price of EUR 330 million on 19 November 2003, by which the privatisation was concluded. Under European legislation aimed at ensuring non-discriminative conditions on the energy market, in 2007 a legal unbundling of the company took place, resulting in the establishment of ZSE Energia, a.s. as an energy trader and ZSE Distribúcia, a.s., later renamed to Západoslovenská distribučná, a.s., as an independent distribution system operator.

== Utility sales ==
ZSE is a traditional electricity supplier in Slovakia. Within the historical division into Western, Central and Eastern Slovakia, ZSE was the supplier in the Western part of Slovakia, covering the current Bratislava, Trnava, Nitra and Trenčín regions. The Regulatory Office for Network Industries appointed ZSE as the Supplier of the last instance, which means it is obliged to supply electricity if another supplier is unable to comply with their obligations. The company took on this role when PBPT Holding and Vaša Energia ended their operations.

== Non-commodity services ==
After 2008, ZSE extended its activities and turned from a commodity (utility) supplier to a supplier of comprehensive energy solutions for households, companies and institutions. Electricity and gas sales were supplemented by several non-commodity services and services aimed at renewables (photovoltaic - PV, solar collectors, air-conditioning, various assistance services, insurances, smart home appliances, etc.). Utilities and non-commodity services are being sold through its ZSE Energia, a.s. subsidiary.

== Electricity distribution ==
Západoslovenská distribučná, a.s., a subsidiary of ZSE, is the largest electricity distributor in Slovakia with over 1 million supply points. The mission of Západoslovenská distribučná is a reliable and safe electricity supply in Western Slovakia. Its activities include significant investments in the renewal and development of distribution equipment and the development of electronic services.

== E-mobility ==
ZSE is one of the largest providers of infrastructure for electric vehicles (EV) in Slovakia. Under its own ZSE Drive brand, ZSE operates an own network of charging stations across all regions of Slovakia. ZSE also provides related services to households, companies and municipalities.

== Corporate Responsibility ==
ZSE has traditionally been a socially responsible corporation. For these purposes, the ZSE Foundation was established in 2014. The main areas supported by ZSE are environment conservation, education support, development of innovations and community-oriented welfare activities. In 2010 – 2013, ZSE reconstructed a technical heritage object in its assets – the building of the former municipal diesel-powered power plant in Piešťany (this facility started its operations in 1906). The "Elektrárňa Piešťany", as it is called, serves today as a community centre for education, culture and social activities.

== See also ==
- Stredoslovenská energetika
- Východoslovenská energetika
