= János Mogyorósi-Klencs =

Hungarian gymnast (1922–1997)

- Born: 31 March 1922 Debrecen, Hungary
- Died: 22 July 1997 (aged 75) Budapest, Hungary
- Relatives: Győző Mogyoróssy (cousin)

Gymnastics career
- Discipline: Men's artistic gymnastics
- Country represented: Hungary
- Club: Debreceni Postás Sportegyesület
Medal record
Men's artistic gymnastics
Representing Hungary
Olympic Games
Silver medal – second place	1948 London	Floor
Bronze medal – third place	1948 London	Team
Bronze medal – third place	1948 London	Vault

János Mogyorósi-Klencs (31 March 1922 – 22 July 1997) was a Hungarian gymnast, born in Debrecen. He competed in gymnastics events at the 1948 Summer Olympics and the 1952 Summer Olympics. He won a bronze medal with the Hungarian team at the 1948 Summer Olympics, as well as an individual silver medal in floor exercise, and a bronze medal in horse vault.
