= Kostoľany nad Hornádom =

Kostoľany nad Hornádom Hernádszentistván
- Municipality
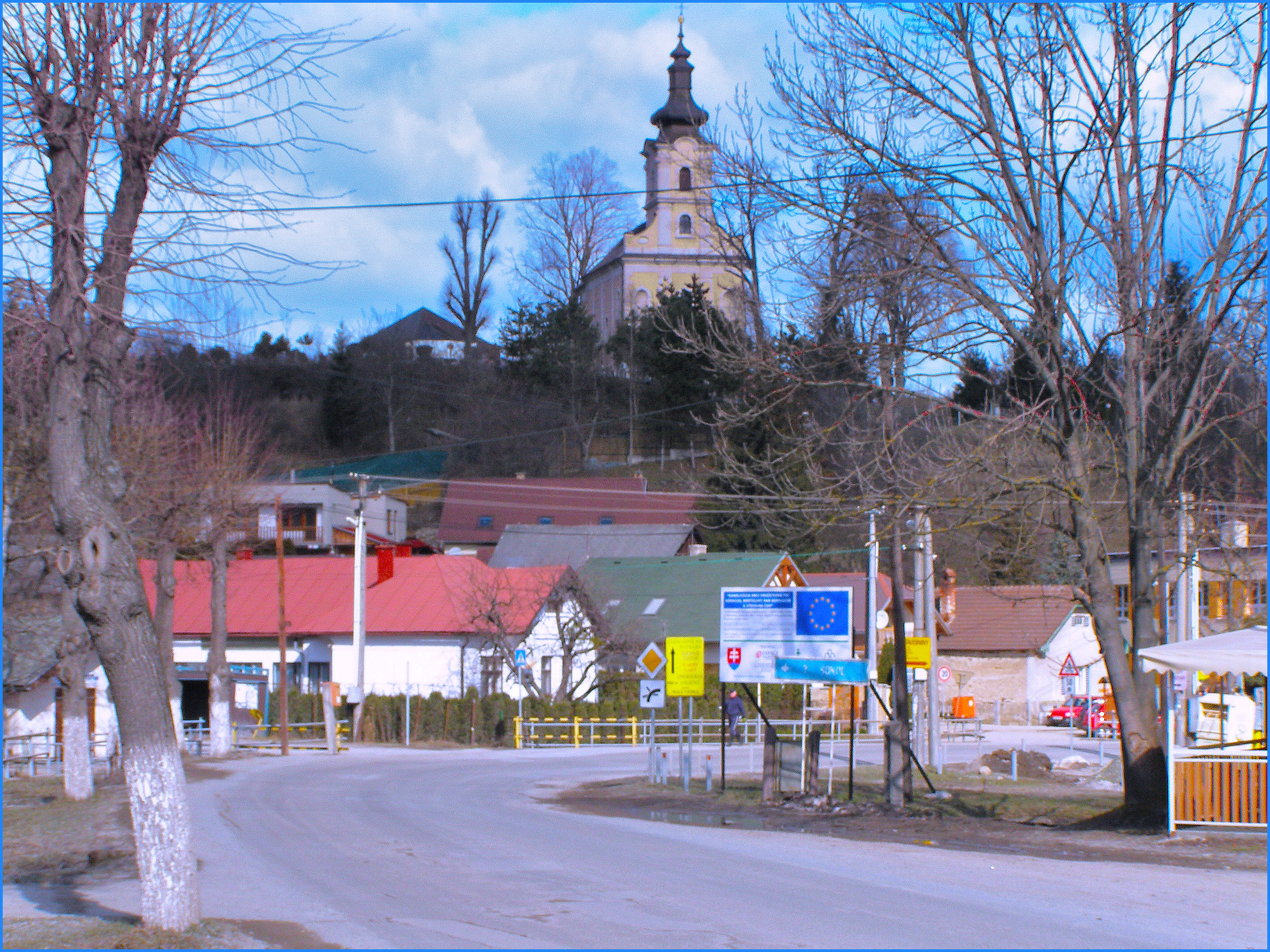

- Flag

- Location of Kostoľany nad Hornádom in the Košice Region Location of Kostoľany nad Hornádom in Slovakia
- Coordinates: 48.71°N 21.24°E
- Country: Slovakia
- Region: Košice Region
- District: Košice-okolie District
- First mentioned: 1423

Area
  - Total: 0.00 km^{2} (0 sq mi)
- Elevation: 230 m (750 ft)

Population (2025)
  - Total: 1,183
- Time zone: UTC+1 (CET)
  - Summer (DST): UTC+2 (CEST)
- Postal code: 443 1
- Area code: +421 55
- Vehicle registration plate (until 2022): KS
- Website: www.kostolany.sk

Kostoľany nad Hornádom (Hungarian: Hernádszentistván) is a village and municipality of Košice-okolie District in the Košice Region of eastern Slovakia, about 10 km north of the city of Košice.

== History ==
In historical records, the village was first mentioned in 1423.

== Geography ==
The municipality lies at an altitude of 230 metres (750 ft) and covers an area of 0.00 km^{2} (0 sq mi) (2025).

== Population ==
Population statistic (10 years)
Year	1995	2005	2015	2025
Count	0	1186	1236	1183
Difference		–	+4.21%	−4.28%

Population statistic
Year	2024	2025
Count	1188	1183
Difference		−0.42%

It has a population of 1183 people (31 December 2025).

=== Ethnicity ===
Census 2021 (1+ %)
Ethnicity	Number	Fraction
Slovak	1186	95.1%
Not found out	55	4.41%
Rusyn	14	1.12%
Total	1247	

In year 2021 was 1247 people by ethnicity 1186 as Slovak, 55 as Not found out, 14 as Rusyn, 11 as Czech, 6 as Romani, 3 as Hungarian, 3 as English, 1 as Polish, 1 as Canadian, 1 as Other and 1 as Albanian.

Note on population: The difference values of population numbers in the table "Population statistic" and in the sections "Ethnicity" & "Religion" is caused by the use of various statistical methods.

=== Religion ===
Census 2021 (1+ %)
Religion	Number	Fraction
Roman Catholic Church	903	72.41%
None	206	16.52%
Not found out	48	3.85%
Greek Catholic Church	44	3.53%
Evangelical Church	23	1.84%
Total	1247	

In year 2021 was 1247 people by religion 903 from Roman Catholic Church, 206 from None, 48 from Not found out, 44 from Greek Catholic Church, 23 from Evangelical Church, 6 from Eastern Orthodox Church, 5 from Other, 3 from Ad hoc movements, 2 from Calvinist Church, 2 from Islam, 1 from Old Catholic Church, 1 from Christian Congregations in Slovakia, 1 from Hinduism, 1 from Church of Jesus Christ of Latter-day Saints and 1 from Apostolic Church.

== Notable people ==
- Matylda Pálfyová (1912-1944), gymnast
