= Stochov =

- Town
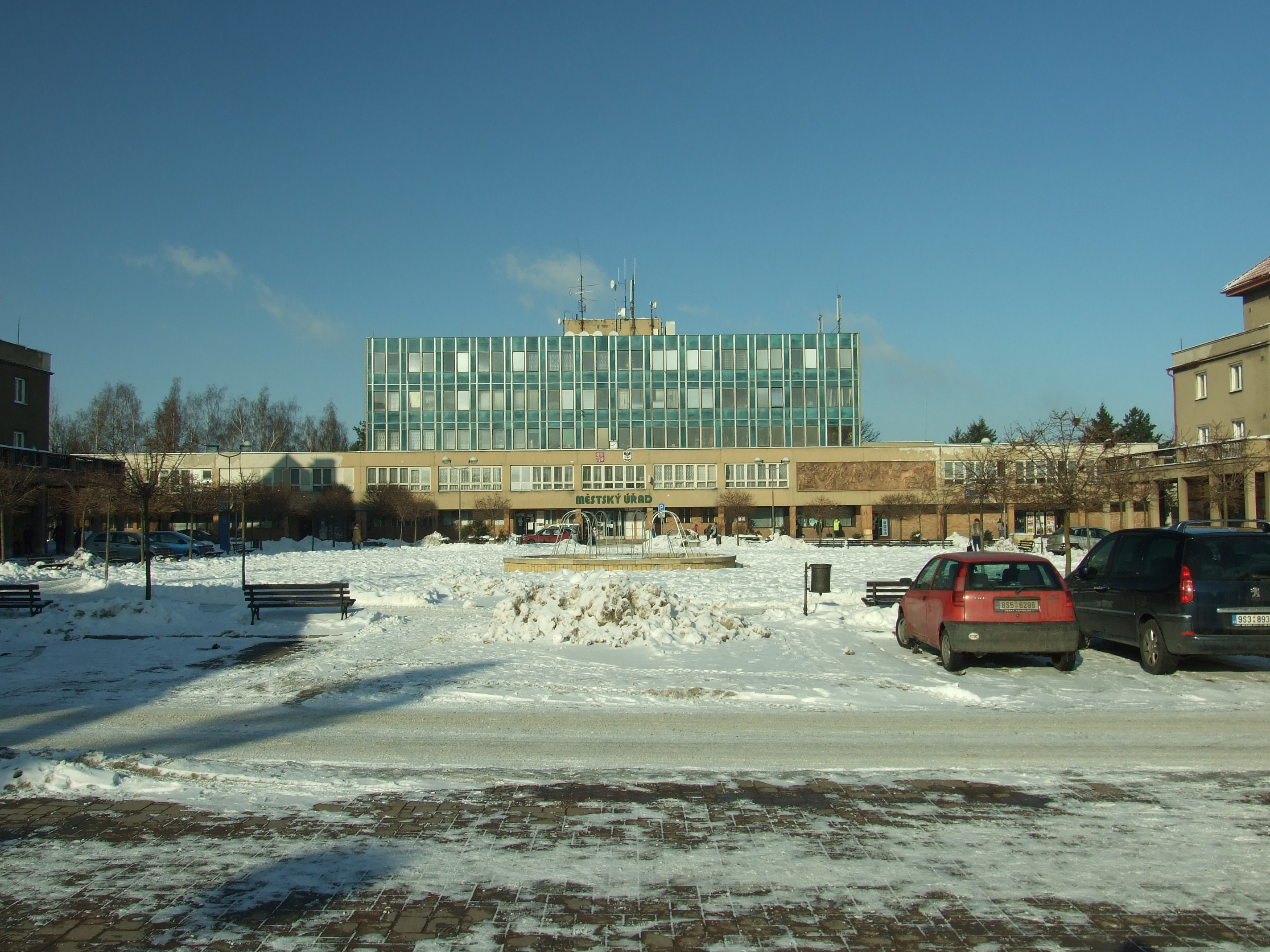
- Town hall

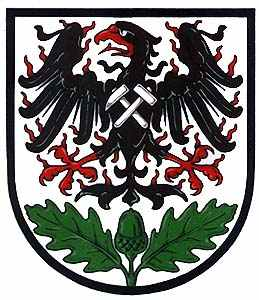
- Flag Coat of arms

- Location in the Czech Republic
- Coordinates: 50°8′47″N 13°57′49″E
- Country: Czech Republic
- Region: Central Bohemian
- District: Kladno
- First mentioned: 1316

Government
  - Mayor: Roman Foršt

Area
  - Total: 9.54 km^{2} (3.68 sq mi)
- Elevation: 448 m (1,470 ft)

Population (2026-01-01)
  - Total: 5,362
  - Density: 562/km^{2} (1,460/sq mi)
- Time zone: UTC+1 (CET)
  - Summer (DST): UTC+2 (CEST)
- Postal code: 273 03
- Website: www.stochov.cz

Stochov (Czech pronunciation: [ˈstoxof]; German: Stochau) is a town in Kladno District in the Central Bohemian Region of the Czech Republic. It has about 5,400 inhabitants.

== Administrative division ==
Stochov consists of three municipal parts (in brackets population according to the 2021 census):

- Stochov (4,423)
- Čelechovice (365)
- Honice (491)

== Etymology ==
According to legend, the name is derived from sto chův (i.e. "hundred nannies") and refers to nannies, who take care here of young Saint Wenceslaus. In fact, the name is derived from the personal name Stoch, meaning "Stoch's (court)".

== Geography ==
Stochov is located about 9 kilometres (6 mi) west of Kladno and 29 km (18 mi) west of Prague. It lies in the Džbán range. The Loděnice River flows along the northern municipal border.

== History ==
The first written mention of Stochov is from 1316. It used to be a small village until the second half of 20th century, when a large housing estate was built west of Stochov to accommodate the increasing number of people working in coal mines in the Kladno area in the 1950s and 1960s. Subsequently, Stochov gained town status in 1967.

== Demographics ==
Historical population

Year	Pop.	±%
1869	909	—
1880	880	−3.2%
1890	880	+0.0%
1900	985	+11.9%
1910	1,119	+13.6%

Year	Pop.	±%
1921	1,096	−2.1%
1930	1,263	+15.2%
1950	1,102	−12.7%
1961	4,333	+293.2%
1970	6,561	+51.4%

Year	Pop.	±%
1980	6,131	−6.6%
1991	5,425	−11.5%
2001	5,397	−0.5%
2011	5,398	+0.0%
2021	5,279	−2.2%

Source: Censuses

== Transport ==
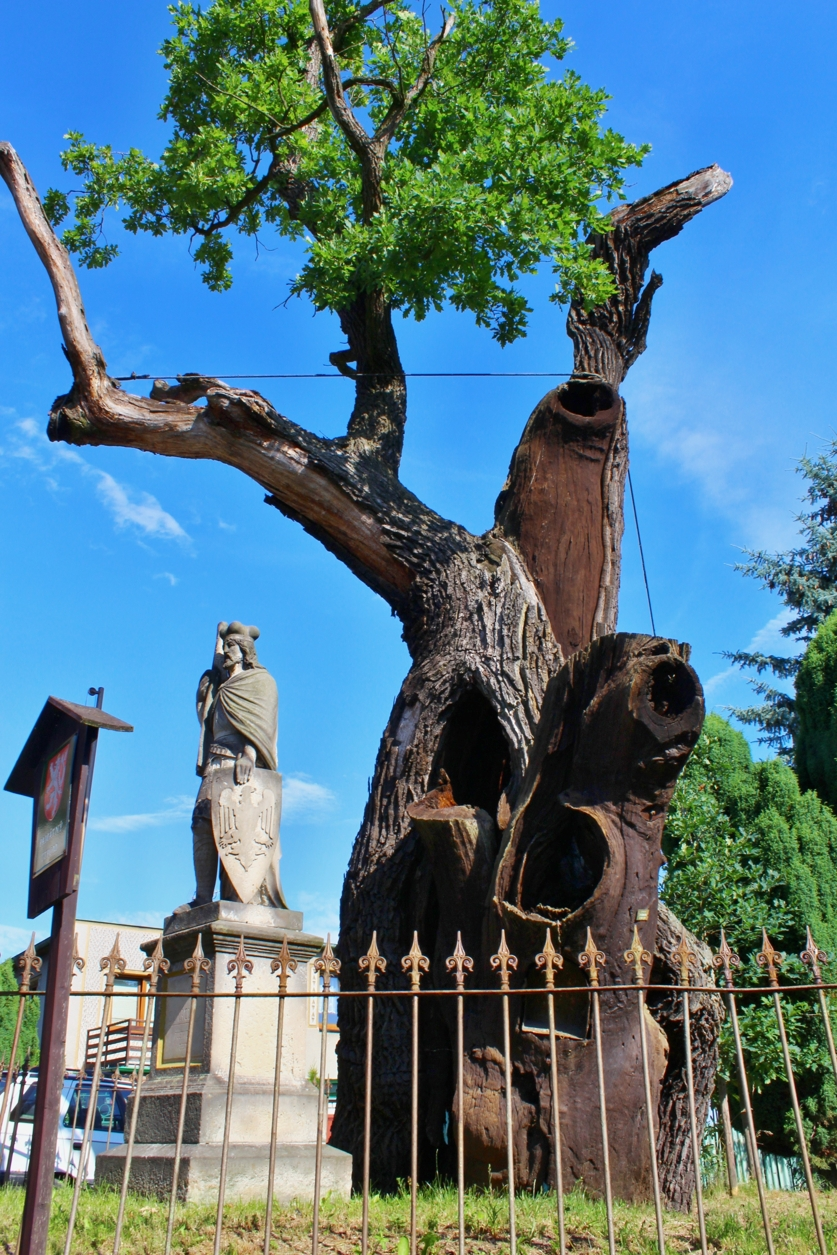
Saint Wenceslaus' Oak

The D6 motorway from Prague to Karlovy Vary runs through the municipal territory.

Stochov is located on the railway line Prague–Rakovník via Kladno.

== Sights ==
According to legend, Saint Wenceslaus was born in Stochov and his grandmother Saint Ludmila then planted an oak tree to commemorate this event. The aged and half withered oak tree, estimated to be about 700–1,000 years old and called Svatováclavský dub ("Saint Wenceslaus' Oak"), is the main sight of the town, and is considered to be one of the oldest and most significant trees in the Czech Republic.

A sandstone statue of St. Wenceslaus from 1887 stands in front of the oak tree.

== Notable people ==
- Božena Dobešová (1914–1990), gymnast

== Twin towns – sister cities ==
Stochov is twinned with:

- Bourbon-Lancy, France
- Saarwellingen, Germany
