= Michael Reusch =

Swiss artistic gymnast

Personal information
- Born: 3 February 1914
- Died: 6 April 1989 (aged 75)

Gymnastics career
- Discipline: Men's artistic gymnastics
- Country represented: Switzerland
Medal record
Olympic Games
Gold medal – first place	1948 London	Parallel bars
Silver medal – second place	1936 Berlin	Parallel bars
Silver medal – second place	1936 Berlin	Team combined exercises
Silver medal – second place	1948 London	Rings
Silver medal – second place	1948 London	Team combined exercises
World Championships
Gold medal – first place	1938 Prague	Pommel horse
Gold medal – first place	1938 Prague	Parallel bars
Gold medal – first place	1938 Prague	Horizontal bar
Silver medal – second place	1938 Prague	Team
Silver medal – second place	1938 Prague	Rings

Michael Reusch (3 February 1914 – 6 April 1989) was a Swiss gymnast and Olympic champion. He competed at the 1936 Summer Olympics in Berlin, where he received silver medals in parallel bars and team combined exercises. At the 1948 Summer Olympics in London he received a gold medal in parallel bars, and silver medals in rings and team combined exercises. Additionally, he competed at the 1938 World Artistic Gymnastics Championships where he helped his Swiss team to the silver medal, won individual gold medals on the pommel horse, parallel bars, and horizontal bars apparatuses, and an individual silver medal on the rings apparatus.
