= Vratislav Petráček =

Czech gymnast (1910–1987)

- Born: 22 February 1910 České Budějovice, Bohemia, Austria-Hungary
- Died: 23 May 1987 (aged 77) Prague, Czech Republic

Gymnastics career
- Discipline: Men's artistic gymnastics
- Country represented: Czechoslovakia
Medal record
Men's gymnastics
Representing Czechoslovakia
World Championships
Gold medal – first place	1938 Prague	Team
Silver medal – second place	1938 Prague	Pommel horse
Bronze medal – third place	1938 Prague	Rings

Vratislav Petráček (22 February 1910 – 23 May 1987) was a Czech gymnast. He competed for Czechoslovakia at the 1936 Summer Olympics, helping his team to 4th there, and the 1948 Summer Olympics, where he helped his team to 6th place. Additionally, he competed at the 1938 World Artistic Gymnastics Championships where he helped his Czechoslovak team to a gold medal, won an individual silver medal on the pommel horse apparatus, and an individual bronze medal on the rings apparatus.
