= Karl Frei =

Swiss gymnast

- Born: 8 March 1917
- Died: 18 June 2011 (aged 94)

Gymnastics career
- Discipline: Men's artistic gymnastics
Medal record
Olympic Games
Gold medal – first place	1948 London	Rings

Karl Frei (8 March 1917 – 18 June 2011) was a Swiss gymnast and Olympic Champion. He competed at the 1948 Summer Olympics in London where he received a gold medal in the rings discipline.
