= André Weingand =

French gymnast (1915–2004)

- Full name: Georges André Weingand
- Born: 14 March 1915 Luxeuil-les-Bains, France
- Died: 6 March 2004 (aged 88) Saint-Martin-d'Hères, France
- Height: 1.68 m (5 ft 6 in)

Gymnastics career
- Discipline: Men's artistic gymnastics
- Country represented: France
Medal record
Men's artistic gymnastics
Representing France
World Championships
Bronze medal – third place	1950 Basel	Team

Georges André Weingand (14 March 1915 – 6 March 2004) was a French gymnast. He competed at the 1948 Summer Olympics and the 1952 Summer Olympics.
