= Lucien Masset =

French gymnast

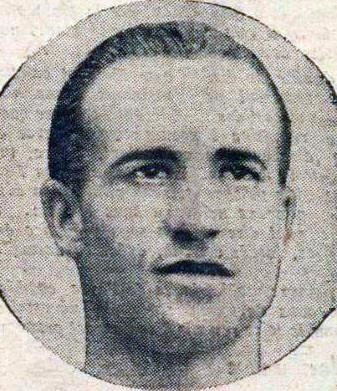
- Masset in 1941

Personal information
- Full name: Joannès Lucien Masset
- Born: 11 May 1914 Lyon, France
- Died: 17 April 2005 (aged 90) Charnay, Rhône, France

Gymnastics career
- Discipline: Men's artistic gymnastics
- Country represented: France
- Gym: Lyon
Medal record
Men's artistic gymnastics
Representing France
World Championships
Bronze medal – third place	1950 Basel	Team

Joannès Lucien Masset (11 May 1914 – 17 April 2005) was a French gymnast. He competed at the 1936 Summer Olympics and the 1948 Summer Olympics.
