= Jey Kugeler =

Luxembourgish gymnast (1910–1983)

- Full name: Jean Kugeler
- Born: 18 April 1910 Schifflange, Luxembourg
- Died: 25 August 1983 (aged 73) Differdange, Luxembourg

Gymnastics career
- Discipline: Men's artistic gymnastics
- Country represented: Luxembourg

Jean "Jey" Kugeler (18 April 1910 – 25 August 1983) was a Luxembourgish gymnast. He competed at the 1936 Summer Olympics, the 1948 Summer Olympics and the 1952 Summer Olympics.
