= Gymnastics at the 1960 Summer Olympics – Women's floor =

Women's floor at the Games of the XVII Olympiad
- Date: 6–8 September 1960
- Competitors: 124 from 28 nations
- Winning score: 19.583

Medalists
1st place, gold medalist(s)		Larisa Latynina	Soviet Union
2nd place, silver medalist(s)		Polina Astakhova	Soviet Union
3rd place, bronze medalist(s)		Tamara Lyukhina	Soviet Union

These are the results of the women's floor competition, one of six events for female competitors in artistic gymnastics at the 1960 Summer Olympics in Rome.

== Competition format ==
The gymnastics all-around events continued to use the aggregation format. Each nation entered a team of six gymnasts or up to three individual gymnasts. All entrants in the gymnastics competitions performed both a compulsory exercise and a voluntary exercise for each apparatus. The scores for all 8 exercises were summed to give an individual all-around score.

These exercise scores were also used for qualification for the new apparatus finals. The two exercises (compulsory and voluntary) for each apparatus were summed to give an apparatus score; the top 6 in each apparatus participated in the finals; others were ranked 7th through 124th. For the apparatus finals, the all-around score for that apparatus was multiplied by one-half then added to the final round exercise score to give a final total.

Exercise scores ranged from 0 to 10, with the final total apparatus score from 0 to 20.

== Results ==
Rank	Gymnast	Nation	Preliminary			Final		
Rank	Gymnast	Nation	Compulsory	Voluntary	Total	1/2 Prelim.	Final	Total
1st place, gold medalist(s)	Larisa Latynina	Soviet Union	9.666	9.900	19.566	9.783	9.800	19.583
2nd place, silver medalist(s)	Polina Astakhova	Soviet Union	9.666	9.866	19.532	9.766	9.766	19.532
3rd place, bronze medalist(s)	Tamara Zamotaylova	Soviet Union	9.566	9.800	19.366	9.683	9.766	19.449
4	Eva Bosáková	Czechoslovakia	9.500	9.666	19.166	9.583	9.800	19.383
5	Sofia Muratova	Soviet Union	9.500	9.733	19.233	9.616	9.733	19.349
6	Sonia Iovan	Romania	9.466	9.733	19.199	9.599	9.633	19.232
7	Lidiya Ivanova	Soviet Union	9.433	9.700	19.133	did not advance		
7	Anikó Ducza	Hungary	9.333	9.800	19.133	did not advance		
9	Věra Čáslavská	Czechoslovakia	9.500	9.600	19.100	did not advance		
9	Ingrid Föst	United Team of Germany	9.500	9.600	19.100	did not advance		
9	Elena Leușteanu	Romania	9.400	9.700	19.100	did not advance		
12	Natalia Kot	Poland	9.466	9.600	19.066	did not advance		
12	Keiko Tanaka-Ikeda	Japan	9.533	9.533	19.066	did not advance		
12	Danuta Nowak-Stachow	Poland	9.466	9.600	19.066	did not advance		
15	Margarita Nikolaeva	Soviet Union	9.433	9.533	18.966	did not advance		
15	Emilia Vătășoiu	Romania	9.400	9.566	18.966	did not advance		
17	Adolfína Tkačíková-Tačová	Czechoslovakia	9.400	9.500	18.900	did not advance		
18	Olga Tass	Hungary	9.233	9.666	18.899	did not advance		
19	Muriel Grossfeld	United States	9.466	9.400	18.866	did not advance		
20	Gizela Niedurny	Poland	9.466	9.366	18.832	did not advance		
21	Ludmila Švédová	Czechoslovakia	9.400	9.400	18.800	did not advance		
21	Brygida Dziuba	Poland	9.400	9.400	18.800	did not advance		
23	Atanasia Ionescu	Romania	9.266	9.500	18.766	did not advance		
23	Miranda Cicognani	Italy	9.300	9.466	18.766	did not advance		
23	Jacqueline Dieudonné	France	9.266	9.500	18.766	did not advance		
26	Judit Füle	Hungary	9.166	9.566	18.732	did not advance		
27	Kazuko Sogabe	Japan	9.400	9.300	18.700	did not advance		
28	Gail Sontgerath	United States	9.333	9.333	18.666	did not advance		
28	Roselore Sonntag	United Team of Germany	9.300	9.366	18.666	did not advance		
30	Kiyoko Ono	Japan	9.333	9.300	18.633	did not advance		
30	Rosella Cicognani	Italy	9.133	9.500	18.633	did not advance		
30	Ute Starke	United Team of Germany	9.133	9.500	18.633	did not advance		
33	Barbara Eustachiewicz	Poland	9.200	9.400	18.600	did not advance		
33	Hana Růžičková	Czechoslovakia	9.300	9.300	18.600	did not advance		
35	Danièle Sicot-Coulon	France	9.133	9.433	18.566	did not advance		
35	Rayna Grigorova	Bulgaria	9.200	9.366	18.566	did not advance		
35	Eryka Mondry-Kost	Poland	9.266	9.300	18.566	did not advance		
38	Kimiko Tsukada	Japan	9.300	9.233	18.533	did not advance		
38	Elena Lagorara	Italy	9.133	9.400	18.533	did not advance		
40	Ulla Lindström	Sweden	9.266	9.266	18.532	did not advance		
41	Gretel Schiener	United Team of Germany	9.266	9.233	18.499	did not advance		
42	Ewa Rydell	Sweden	9.066	9.400	18.466	did not advance		
42	Ginko Abukawa-Chiba	Japan	9.200	9.266	18.466	did not advance		
44	Uta Poreceanu	Romania	9.200	9.233	18.433	did not advance		
44	Mária Bencsik	Hungary	9.133	9.300	18.433	did not advance		
46	Tsvetanka Rangelova	Bulgaria	9.166	9.266	18.432	did not advance		
46	Elena Mărgărit	Romania	9.066	9.366	18.432	did not advance		
48	Gabriella Santarelli	Italy	9.100	9.300	18.400	did not advance		
49	Klára Förstner	Hungary	8.966	9.433	18.399	did not advance		
50	Matylda Matoušková-Šínová	Czechoslovakia	9.133	9.233	18.366	did not advance		
51	Sharon Richardson	United States	9.033	9.300	18.333	did not advance		
52	Katalin Müller-Száll	Hungary	9.066	9.233	18.299	did not advance		
52	Stanka Pavlova	Bulgaria	9.933	9.366	18.299	did not advance		
54	Karin Boldemann	United Team of Germany	9.066	9.200	18.266	did not advance		
54	Ivanka Dolzheva	Bulgaria	9.000	9.266	18.266	did not advance		
54	Teri Montefusco	United States	8.866	9.400	18.266	did not advance		
54	Saltirka Spasova-Tarpova	Bulgaria	9.033	9.233	18.266	did not advance		
54	Anne-Marie Demortière	France	8.933	9.333	18.266	did not advance		
59	Wanda Soprani	Italy	9.000	9.233	18.233	did not advance		
60	Toshiko Shirasu-Aihara	Japan	9.000	9.200	18.200	did not advance		
61	Renate Schneider	United Team of Germany	9.133	9.066	18.199	did not advance		
61	Betty-Jean Maycock	United States	8.833	9.366	18.199	did not advance		
61	Tereza Kočiš	Yugoslavia	8.966	9.233	18.199	did not advance		
61	Francesca Costa	Italy	9.033	9.166	18.199	did not advance		
61	Pirkko Nieminen	Finland	9.166	9.033	18.199	did not advance		
66	Mirjana Bilić	Yugoslavia	9.100	9.066	18.166	did not advance		
67	Monique Rossi	France	8.933	9.200	18.133	did not advance		
68	Lena Adler	Sweden	8.866	9.200	18.066	did not advance		
68	Doris Fuchs	United States	8.866	9.200	18.066	did not advance		
70	Yu Myeong-ja	South Korea	9.033	9.000	18.033	did not advance		
71	Elisaveta Mileva	Bulgaria	8.966	9.066	18.032	did not advance		
72	Ralli Ben-Yehuda	Israel	8.800	9.200	18.000	did not advance		
73	Gerola Lindahl	Sweden	8.733	9.266	17.966	did not advance		
73	Tuovi Sappinen	Finland	8.833	9.166	17.999	did not advance		
75	Paulette le Raer	France	8.900	9.066	17.966	did not advance		
75	Ritva Salonen	Finland	8.933	9.033	17.966	did not advance		
77	Solveig Egman-Andersson	Sweden	8.766	9.133	17.899	did not advance		
78	Antoinette Kuiters	South Africa	8.766	9.066	17.832	did not advance		
79	Ruth Abeles	Israel	8.700	9.066	17.766	did not advance		
80	Renée Hugon	France	8.800	8.933	17.733	did not advance		
80	Elfriede Hirnschall	Austria	8.933	8.800	17.733	did not advance		
82	Monica Elfvin	Sweden	8.700	9.000	17.700	did not advance		
83	Miriam Kara	Israel	8.700	8.866	17.566	did not advance		
84	Raili Tuominen-Hämäläinen	Finland	8.633	8.833	17.466	did not advance		
84	Kaarina Autio	Finland	8.500	8.966	17.466	did not advance		
86	Ernestine Russell	Canada	8.500	8.933	17.433	did not advance		
87	Nevenka Pogačnik	Yugoslavia	8.200	9.066	17.266	did not advance		
88	Eira Lehtonen	Finland	8.533	8.700	17.233	did not advance		
89	Kaye Breadsell	Australia	8.500	8.633	17.133	did not advance		
90	Veronica Grymonprez	Belgium	8.533	8.566	17.099	did not advance		
91	Bep Ipenburg	Netherlands	8.200	8.833	17.033	did not advance		
92	Val Roberts	Australia	8.533	8.466	16.999	did not advance		
93	Nel Fritz	Netherlands	8.166	8.766	16.932	did not advance		
94	Henriette Parzer	Austria	8.466	8.433	16.899	did not advance		
95	Ria Meyburg	Netherlands	8.066	8.700	16.766	did not advance		
95	Lineke Majolee	Netherlands	8.000	8.766	16.766	did not advance		
95	Waltraud Benesch	Austria	8.200	8.566	16.766	did not advance		
95	Nel Wambach	Netherlands	7.966	8.800	16.766	did not advance		
99	Dorothy Summers	Great Britain	7.700	8.800	16.500	did not advance		
100	Gwynedd Lewis-Lingard	Great Britain	7.933	8.333	16.266	did not advance		
101	Liliane Becker	Luxembourg	8.100	8.100	16.200	did not advance		
102	Godelieve Brys	Belgium	8.400	7.766	16.166	did not advance		
102	Renata Müller	Spain	8.200	7.966	16.166	did not advance		
104	Rita Van De Velde	Belgium	8.000	8.100	16.100	did not advance		
105	Yvonne Stoffel-Wagener	Luxembourg	8.066	7.700	15.766	did not advance		
105	Maria Helena Cunha	Portugal	7.933	7.833	15.766	did not advance		
107	Rosa Balaguer	Spain	7.633	7.966	15.599	did not advance		
108	Anni Cermak	Austria	7.500	8.033	15.533	did not advance		
108	Margaret Thomas-Neale	Great Britain	7.633	7.900	15.533	did not advance		
110	Dália da Cunha-Sammer	Portugal	7.700	7.800	15.500	did not advance		
111	Erika Bogovic	Austria	7.466	7.933	15.399	did not advance		
112	Esbela da Fonseca	Portugal	7.366	7.700	15.066	did not advance		
113	Pat Perks	Great Britain	6.766	8.133	14.899	did not advance		
114	Marjorie Carter	Great Britain	7.500	7.166	14.666	did not advance		
115	Montserrat Artamendi	Spain	6.266	8.200	14.466	did not advance		
116	María del Carmen González	Spain	6.433	7.833	14.266	did not advance		
117	Jill Pollard	Great Britain	6.466	7.766	14.232	did not advance		
118	María Luisa Fernández	Spain	6.266	7.933	14.199	did not advance		
119	Louise Parker	Canada	5.100	8.033	13.133	did not advance		
120	Julia Uria	Cuba	4.733	5.666	10.399	did not advance		
121	Yolanda Williams	Cuba	4.933	4.600	9.533	did not advance		
122	Elena Artamendi	Spain	8.300	–	8.300	did not advance		
123	Ria van Velsen	Netherlands	8.066	–	8.066	did not advance		
124	Hildegard Reitter	Austria	7.900	–	7.900	did not advance		
