= Gymnastics at the 1960 Summer Olympics – Women's artistic individual all-around =

Olympic gymnastics event

Women's artistic individual all-around at the Games of the XVII Olympiad
- Venue: Baths of Caracalla
- Date: 6–8 September 1960
- Competitors: 124 from 28 nations
- Winning score: 77.031

Medalists
1st place, gold medalist(s)		Larysa Latynina	Soviet Union
2nd place, silver medalist(s)		Sofiya Muratova	Soviet Union
3rd place, bronze medalist(s)		Polina Astakhova	Soviet Union

The women's artistic individual all-around competition at the 1960 Summer Olympics was held at the Baths of Caracalla from 6 to 8 September. It was the third appearance of the event.

== Competition format ==
The gymnastics format continued to use the aggregation format. Each nation entered either a team of six gymnasts or up to three individual gymnasts. All entrants in the gymnastics competitions performed both a compulsory exercise and a voluntary exercise for each apparatus. The 8 exercise scores were summed to give an individual all-around total. Separate apparatus finals were held, with the top 6 in each apparatus advancing to the final.

Exercise scores ranged from 0 to 10, apparatus scores from 0 to 20, and individual totals from 0 to 80.

== Results ==
Rank	Gymnast	Nation	Exercise results												Total
Rank	Gymnast	Nation	Floor (gymnastics)			Balance beam			Parallel bars			Vault (gymnastics)			Total
Rank	Gymnast	Nation	C	V	T	C	V	T	C	V	T	C	V	T	Total
1st place, gold medalist(s)	Larisa Latynina	Soviet Union	9.666	9.900	19.566	9.366	9.700	19.066	9.700	9.733	19.433	9.533	9.433	18.966	77.031
2nd place, silver medalist(s)	Sofia Muratova	Soviet Union	9.500	9.733	19.233	9.466	9.666	19.132	9.633	9.666	19.299	9.566	9.466	19.032	76.696
3rd place, bronze medalist(s)	Polina Astakhova	Soviet Union	9.666	9.866	19.532	9.500	8.733	18.233	9.800	9.833	19.633	9.466	9.300	18.766	76.164
4	Margarita Nikolaeva	Soviet Union	9.433	9.533	18.966	9.400	9.566	18.966	9.333	9.466	18.799	9.500	9.600	19.100	75.831
5	Sonia Iovan	Romania	9.466	9.733	19.199	9.200	9.400	18.600	9.600	9.666	19.266	9.466	9.266	18.732	75.797
6	Keiko Tanaka-Ikeda	Japan	9.533	9.533	19.066	9.266	9.666	18.932	9.533	9.733	19.266	9.166	9.266	18.432	75.696
7	Lidiya Ivanova	Soviet Union	9.433	9.700	19.133	9.233	9.466	18.699	9.533	9.500	19.033	9.300	9.266	18.566	75.431
8	Věra Čáslavská	Czechoslovakia	9.500	9.600	19.100	9.233	9.533	18.766	9.233	9.500	18.733	9.433	9.266	18.699	75.298
9	Ingrid Föst	United Team of Germany	9.500	9.600	19.100	9.300	9.400	18.700	9.433	9.533	18.966	9.133	9.366	18.499	75.265
10	Eva Bosáková	Czechoslovakia	9.500	9.666	19.166	9.400	9.766	19.166	9.400	9.466	18.866	9.333	8.666	17.999	75.197
11	Elena Leușteanu	Romania	9.400	9.700	19.100	9.066	9.300	18.366	9.400	9.566	18.966	9.333	9.100	18.433	74.865
12	Natalia Kot	Poland	9.466	9.600	19.066	8.900	9.433	18.333	9.466	9.533	18.999	9.266	9.200	18.466	74.864
13	Ludmila Švédová	Czechoslovakia	9.400	9.400	18.800	9.200	9.433	18.633	9.400	9.233	18.633	9.333	9.166	18.499	74.565
14	Adolfína Tkačíková-Tačová	Czechoslovakia	9.400	9.500	18.900	9.166	9.266	18.432	9.166	9.300	18.466	9.466	9.300	18.766	74.564
15	Kiyoko Ono	Japan	9.333	9.300	18.633	9.066	9.300	18.366	9.400	9.566	18.966	9.400	9.033	18.433	74.398
16	Emilia Vătășoiu	Romania	9.400	9.566	18.966	9.000	9.233	18.233	9.366	9.366	18.732	9.300	9.033	18.333	74.264
17	Danuta Nowak-Stachow	Poland	9.466	9.600	19.066	8.966	9.266	18.232	9.100	9.433	18.533	9.133	8.966	18.099	73.930
18	Rayna Grigorova	Bulgaria	9.200	9.366	18.566	9.200	9.466	18.666	9.466	9.400	18.866	9.000	8.800	17.800	73.898
19	Judit Füle	Hungary	9.166	9.566	18.732	9.000	9.200	18.400	9.466	9.000	18.466	9.033	9.200	18.233	73.831
20	Miranda Cicognani	Italy	9.300	9.466	18.766	9.000	9.366	18.366	9.433	9.566	18.999	8.433	9.033	17.466	73.597
21	Atanasia Ionescu	Romania	9.266	9.500	18.766	9.133	9.200	18.333	9.166	9.300	18.466	9.033	9.966	17.999	73.564
22	Anikó Ducza	Hungary	9.333	9.800	19.133	8.166	9.233	17.399	9.200	9.400	18.600	9.266	9.000	18.266	73.398
22	Kimiko Tsukada	Japan	9.300	9.233	18.533	8.833	9.366	18.199	9.300	9.600	18.900	9.100	8.666	17.766	73.398
24	Barbara Eustachiewicz	Poland	9.200	9.400	18.600	9.000	9.233	18.233	9.233	9.233	18.466	9.033	8.966	17.999	73.298
24	Toshiko Shirasu-Aihara	Japan	9.000	9.200	18.200	9.266	9.200	18.466	9.300	9.300	18.600	9.066	8.966	18.032	73.298
26	Matylda Matoušková-Šínová	Czechoslovakia	9.133	9.233	18.366	9.000	9.200	18.200	9.266	9.400	18.666	9.100	8.933	18.033	73.265
27	Uta Poreceanu	Romania	9.200	9.233	18.433	8.933	9.233	18.166	9.166	9.366	18.532	9.066	9.000	18.066	73.197
28	Gail Sontgerath	United States	9.333	9.333	18.666	9.000	9.333	18.333	9.066	8.900	17.966	9.166	8.966	18.132	73.097
29	Roselore Sonntag	United Team of Germany	9.300	9.366	18.666	9.133	9.200	18.333	9.166	9.466	18.632	8.933	8.400	17.333	72.964
29	Ewa Rydell	Sweden	9.066	9.400	18.466	8.966	9.033	17.999	9.066	9.000	18.066	9.200	9.233	18.433	72.964
31	Ute Starke	United Team of Germany	9.133	9.500	18.633	9.066	9.400	18.466	9.400	9.033	18.433	7.800	9.466	17.266	72.798
32	Eryka Mondry-Kost	Poland	9.266	9.300	18.566	9.000	9.300	18.300	8.966	9.233	18.199	9.133	8.566	17.699	72.764
33	Hana Růžičková	Czechoslovakia	9.300	9.300	18.600	9.100	9.200	18.300	8.966	9.000	17.966	9.166	8.700	17.866	72.732
34	Rosella Cicognani	Italy	9.133	9.500	18.633	9.066	8.233	17.299	9.366	9.533	18.899	8.766	9.100	17.866	72.697
34	Gretel Schiener	United Team of Germany	9.266	9.233	18.499	9.100	9.233	18.333	9.300	9.133	18.433	8.866	8.566	17.432	72.697
34	Klára Förstner	Hungary	8.966	9.433	18.399	9.000	9.000	18.000	9.000	9.266	18.266	9.066	8.966	18.032	72.697
37	Gizela Niedurny	Poland	9.466	9.366	18.832	9.000	7.983	16.983	9.366	9.600	18.966	9.166	8.700	17.866	72.647
38	Katalin Müller-Száll	Hungary	9.066	9.233	18.299	9.300	9.066	18.366	8.966	9.033	17.999	9.200	8.666	17.866	72.530
39	Doris Fuchs	United States	8.866	9.200	18.066	9.066	8.400	17.466	9.400	9.600	19.000	9.066	8.900	17.966	72.498
40	Olga Tass	Hungary	9.233	9.666	18.899	9.033	7.966	16.999	9.333	9.300	18.633	9.133	8.733	17.866	72.397
41	Tereza Kočiš	Yugoslavia	8.966	9.233	18.199	8.833	9.233	18.066	9.300	9.266	18.566	8.766	8.766	17.532	72.363
42	Ivanka Dolzheva	Bulgaria	9.000	9.266	18.266	8.633	9.033	17.666	9.300	9.200	18.500	9.200	8.700	17.900	72.332
43	Ginko Abukawa-Chiba	Japan	9.200	9.266	18.466	9.000	8.166	17.166	9.233	9.233	18.466	9.433	8.800	18.233	72.331
44	Sharon Richardson	United States	9.033	9.300	18.333	8.366	9.233	17.599	8.600	9.066	17.666	9.200	9.333	18.533	72.131
45	Saltirka Spasova-Tarpova	Bulgaria	9.033	9.233	18.266	8.900	8.966	17.866	9.366	9.300	18.666	8.200	9.066	17.266	72.064
46	Mária Bencsik	Hungary	9.133	9.300	18.433	9.066	8.766	17.832	8.966	8.933	17.899	8.933	8.933	17.866	72.030
46	Mirjana Bilić	Yugoslavia	9.100	9.066	18.166	8.933	9.066	17.999	9.333	8.400	17.733	8.966	9.166	18.132	72.030
48	Renate Schneider	United Team of Germany	9.133	9.066	18.199	9.133	8.266	17.399	9.166	9.333	18.499	8.766	9.166	17.932	72.029
49	Tsvetanka Rangelova	Bulgaria	9.166	9.266	18.432	9.066	7.966	17.032	8.800	9.366	18.166	9.033	9.333	18.366	71.996
50	Elisaveta Mileva	Bulgaria	8.966	9.066	18.032	8.966	8.966	17.932	9.000	8.900	17.900	9.000	9.100	18.100	71.964
51	Betty-Jean Maycock	United States	8.833	9.366	18.199	8.600	9.166	17.766	9.066	9.066	18.132	8.633	9.200	17.833	71.930
52	Brygida Dziuba	Poland	9.400	9.400	18.800	9.066	8.200	17.266	8.866	9.033	17.899	8.933	9.000	17.933	71.898
53	Danièle Sicot-Coulon	France	9.133	9.433	18.566	9.000	8.033	17.033	9.033	9.266	18.299	9.100	8.766	17.866	71.764
54	Stanka Pavlova	Bulgaria	9.933	9.366	18.299	8.933	9.133	18.066	8.633	9.133	17.766	8.733	8.833	17.566	71.697
55	Wanda Soprani	Italy	9.000	9.233	18.233	9.066	8.933	17.999	9.100	8.866	17.966	8.700	8.766	17.466	71.664
56	Kazuko Sogabe	Japan	9.400	9.300	18.700	8.900	9.533	18.433	9.333	9.500	18.833	8.966	6.666	15.632	71.598
57	Jacqueline Dieudonné	France	9.266	9.500	18.766	9.133	8.833	17.966	9.000	8.800	17.800	8.766	8.266	17.032	71.564
58	Teri Montefusco	United States	8.866	9.400	18.266	8.533	9.166	17.699	8.566	9.266	17.832	8.633	8.933	17.566	71.363
59	Karin Boldemann	United Team of Germany	9.066	9.200	18.266	9.000	7.933	16.933	9.300	8.866	18.166	9.200	8.733	17.933	71.298
60	Elena Lagorara	Italy	9.133	9.400	18.533	8.700	7.900	16.600	9.366	9.366	18.732	8.233	9.166	17.399	71.264
61	Gerola Lindahl	Sweden	8.733	9.266	17.966	8.933	8.850	17.783	9.000	8.366	17.366	9.166	8.933	18.099	71.247
62	Lena Adler	Sweden	8.866	9.200	18.066	8.666	8.900	17.566	8.766	8.333	17.099	9.000	9.446	18.466	71.197
63	Pirkko Nieminen	Finland	9.166	9.033	18.199	8.266	9.000	17.266	9.233	9.333	18.566	8.133	8.966	17.099	71.130
64	Monica Elfvin	Sweden	8.700	9.000	17.700	8.866	9.000	17.866	9.000	8.133	17.133	9.033	9.033	18.066	70.765
65	Anne-Marie Demortière	France	8.933	9.333	18.266	9.166	8.900	18.066	8.933	8.600	17.533	8.633	8.266	16.899	70.764
66	Solveig Egman-Andersson	Sweden	8.766	9.133	17.899	8.900	8.700	17.600	8.433	8.666	17.099	9.000	9.133	18.133	70.731
67	Elena Mărgărit	Romania	9.066	9.366	18.432	6.800	9.066	15.866	9.033	9.000	18.033	9.166	9.066	18.232	70.563
68	Ulla Lindström	Sweden	9.266	9.266	18.532	9.033	9.200	18.233	8.800	8.200	17.000	7.266	9.366	16.632	70.397
69	Paulette le Raer	France	8.900	9.066	17.966	8.600	8.600	17.200	8.800	8.766	17.566	8.900	8.600	17.500	70.232
70	Muriel Grossfeld	United States	9.466	9.400	18.866	8.900	8.200	17.100	9.233	7.733	16.966	8.400	8.800	17.200	70.132
71	Gabriella Santarelli	Italy	9.100	9.300	18.400	8.966	8.066	17.032	9.300	8.766	18.066	8.066	8.366	16.432	69.930
72	Francesca Costa	Italy	9.033	9.166	18.199	8.700	8.600	17.300	8.900	8.133	17.033	8.333	8.933	17.266	69.798
73	Monique Rossi	France	8.933	9.200	18.133	8.700	8.466	17.166	8.800	8.366	17.166	8.733	8.300	17.033	69.498
74	Tuovi Sappinen	Finland	8.833	9.166	17.999	7.800	8.900	16.700	8.833	9.166	17.999	7.666	8.800	16.466	69.164
75	Bep Ipenburg	Netherlands	8.200	8.833	17.033	8.133	8.766	16.899	8.933	9.300	18.233	8.333	8.600	16.933	69.098
76	Ernestine Russell	Canada	8.500	8.933	17.433	8.833	8.200	17.033	8.533	8.933	17.466	8.300	8.700	17.000	68.932
77	Ritva Salonen	Finland	8.933	9.033	17.966	7.566	8.800	16.366	8.400	8.766	17.166	8.500	8.700	17.200	68.698
78	Nevenka Pogačnik	Yugoslavia	8.200	9.066	17.266	8.233	7.500	15.733	8.933	9.100	18.033	8.800	8.600	17.400	68.432
79	Lineke Majolee	Netherlands	8.000	8.766	16.766	8.000	8.866	16.966	8.700	9.100	17.800	8.266	8.633	16.899	68.431
80	Antoinette Kuiters	South Africa	8.766	9.066	17.832	8.100	8.533	16.633	8.633	8.733	17.366	8.333	8.233	16.566	68.397
81	Ralli Ben-Yehuda	Israel	8.800	9.200	18.000	7.600	8.666	16.266	8.733	9.166	17.899	7.566	8.433	15.999	68.164
82	Eira Lehtonen	Finland	8.533	8.700	17.233	8.033	9.066	17.099	8.666	8.166	16.832	8.200	8.500	16.700	67.864
83	Waltraud Benesch	Austria	8.200	8.566	16.766	8.200	8.666	16.866	8.500	9.000	17.500	8.100	8.266	16.366	67.498
84	Renée Hugon	France	8.800	8.933	17.733	7.833	7.633	15.466	8.700	8.700	17.400	8.666	8.133	16.799	67.398
85	Nel Fritz	Netherlands	8.166	8.766	16.932	8.033	9.000	17.033	8.366	9.000	17.366	8.000	8.066	16.066	67.397
86	Miriam Kara	Israel	8.700	8.866	17.566	7.800	8.700	16.500	8.766	9.033	17.799	7.700	7.600	15.300	67.165
86	Nel Wambach	Netherlands	7.966	8.800	16.766	7.900	8.900	16.800	8.466	9.033	17.499	8.000	8.100	16.100	67.165
88	Yu Myeong-ja	South Korea	9.033	9.000	18.033	7.333	7.833	15.166	8.466	8.800	17.266	8.000	8.666	16.666	67.131
89	Tamara Zamotaylova	Soviet Union	9.566	9.800	19.366	9.533	–	9.533	9.566	9.700	19.266	9.266	9.233	18.499	66.664
90	Raili Tuominen-Hämäläinen	Finland	8.633	8.833	17.466	8.000	7.866	15.866	8.000	8.966	16.966	7.966	8.366	16.332	66.630
91	Henriette Parzer	Austria	8.466	8.433	16.899	8.333	7.066	15.399	8.166	8.800	16.966	8.400	8.866	17.266	66.530
92	Kaarina Autio	Finland	8.500	8.966	17.466	7.400	8.800	16.200	8.400	8.500	16.900	7.600	8.333	15.933	66.499
93	Ruth Abeles	Israel	8.700	9.066	17.766	6.900	7.700	14.600	8.766	9.233	17.999	8.133	7.766	15.899	66.264
94	Elfriede Hirnschall	Austria	8.933	8.800	17.733	8.666	8.800	17.466	8.366	8.166	16.532	8.200	6.000	14.200	65.931
95	Ria Meyburg	Netherlands	8.066	8.700	16.766	8.100	8.933	17.033	5.966	8.900	14.866	8.466	8.666	17.132	65.797
96	Veronica Grymonprez	Belgium	8.533	8.566	17.099	8.033	7.666	15.699	8.566	8.233	16.799	7.766	8.200	15.966	65.563
97	Godelieve Brys	Belgium	8.400	7.766	16.166	7.933	8.300	16.233	8.533	7.200	15.733	8.433	8.033	16.466	64.598
98	Liliane Becker	Luxembourg	8.100	8.100	16.200	7.533	8.400	15.933	7.633	7.866	15.499	8.066	8.500	16.566	64.198
99	Rita Van De Velde	Belgium	8.000	8.100	16.100	7.733	8.033	15.766	8.400	8.066	16.466	7.966	7.800	15.766	64.098
100	Kaye Breadsell	Australia	8.500	8.633	17.133	7.800	7.366	15.166	8.900	8.333	17.233	7.933	6.366	14.299	63.831
101	Erika Bogovic	Austria	7.466	7.933	15.399	7.600	8.433	16.033	7.866	8.600	16.466	7.400	7.366	14.766	62.664
102	Anni Cermak	Austria	7.500	8.033	15.533	7.933	6.583	14.516	7.800	8.566	16.366	7.966	8.100	16.066	62.491
103	Gwynedd Lewis-Lingard	Great Britain	7.933	8.333	16.266	7.366	7.833	15.199	6.500	6.666	13.166	8.366	8.033	16.399	61.030
104	Renata Müller	Spain	8.200	7.966	16.166	6.433	7.533	13.966	7.833	7.800	15.633	6.866	7.900	14.766	60.531
105	Rosa Balaguer	Spain	7.633	7.966	15.599	7.400	7.866	15.266	6.200	7.666	13.866	7.700	8.033	15.733	60.464
106	Yvonne Stoffel-Wagener	Luxembourg	8.066	7.700	15.766	6.533	8.000	14.533	6.866	7.366	14.232	7.966	7.600	15.566	60.097
107	Pat Perks	Great Britain	6.766	8.133	14.899	7.433	7.400	14.833	7.166	7.200	14.366	8.133	7.700	15.833	59.931
108	Margaret Thomas-Neale	Great Britain	7.633	7.900	15.533	7.433	7.633	15.066	6.900	7.400	14.300	7.833	6.666	14.499	59.398
109	Dália da Cunha-Sammer	Portugal	7.700	7.800	15.500	6.400	8.166	14.566	5.133	7.800	12.933	8.233	7.933	16.166	59.165
110	Marjorie Carter	Great Britain	7.500	7.166	14.666	7.166	7.266	14.432	6.833	6.666	13.499	7.766	8.100	15.866	58.463
111	Val Roberts	Australia	8.533	8.466	16.999	7.066	8.233	15.299	5.200	7.000	12.200	8.000	5.800	13.800	58.298
112	Montserrat Artamendi	Spain	6.266	8.200	14.466	7.400	7.266	14.666	5.700	6.833	12.533	8.066	8.066	16.132	57.797
113	María del Carmen González	Spain	6.433	7.833	14.266	7.333	6.200	13.533	7.033	7.333	14.366	7.933	7.333	15.266	57.431
114	María Luisa Fernández	Spain	6.266	7.933	14.199	7.766	6.333	14.099	6.433	6.200	12.633	7.300	7.400	14.700	55.631
115	Elena Artamendi	Spain	8.300	–	8.300	7.600	7.766	15.366	8.100	7.766	15.866	7.933	8.066	15.999	55.531
116	Esbela da Fonseca	Portugal	7.366	7.700	15.066	6.933	6.833	13.766	3.600	7.133	10.733	8.100	7.766	15.866	55.431
117	Jill Pollard	Great Britain	6.466	7.766	14.232	7.366	7.500	14.866	5.466	5.566	11.032	7.700	6.800	14.500	54.630
118	Dorothy Summers	Great Britain	7.700	8.800	16.500	7.500	7.100	14.600	6.133	2.500	8.633	7.566	7.066	14.632	54.365
119	Maria Helena Cunha	Portugal	7.933	7.833	15.766	6.966	7.466	14.432	2.666	6.433	9.099	7.666	6.200	13.866	53.163
120	Louise Parker	Canada	5.100	8.033	13.133	6.733	6.066	12.799	7.033	3.500	10.533	6.500	8.033	14.533	50.998
121	Yolanda Williams	Cuba	4.933	4.600	9.533	4.000	7.333	11.333	6.200	7.166	13.366	–	7.866	7.866	42.098
122	Ria van Velsen	Netherlands	8.066	–	8.066	7.666	–	7.666	9.033	8.000	17.033	8.633	–	8.633	41.398
123	Julia Uria	Cuba	4.733	5.666	10.399	3.833	5.966	9.799	6.066	7.133	13.199	–	5.933	5.933	39.330
124	Hildegard Reitter	Austria	7.900	–	7.900	7.800	–	7.800	8.100	–	8.100	7.000	–	7.000	30.800
