= Gymnastics at the 1960 Summer Olympics – Women's uneven bars =

Women's uneven bars at the Games of the XVII Olympiad
- Date: 6–8 September 1960
- Competitors: 124 from 28 nations
- Winning score: 19.616

Medalists
1st place, gold medalist(s)		Polina Astakhova	Soviet Union
2nd place, silver medalist(s)		Larisa Latynina	Soviet Union
3rd place, bronze medalist(s)		Tamara Lyukhina	Soviet Union

These are the results of the women's uneven bars competition, one of six events for female competitors in artistic gymnastics at the 1960 Summer Olympics in Rome.

== Competition format ==
The gymnastics all-around events continued to use the aggregation format. Each nation entered a team of six gymnasts or up to three individual gymnasts. All entrants in the gymnastics competitions performed both a compulsory exercise and a voluntary exercise for each apparatus. The scores for all 8 exercises were summed to give an individual all-around score.

These exercise scores were also used for qualification for the new apparatus finals. The two exercises (compulsory and voluntary) for each apparatus were summed to give an apparatus score; the top 6 in each apparatus participated in the finals; others were ranked 7th through 124th. For the apparatus finals, the all-around score for that apparatus was multiplied by one-half then added to the final round exercise score to give a final total.

Exercise scores ranged from 0 to 10, with the final total apparatus score from 0 to 20.

== Results ==
Rank	Gymnast	Nation	Preliminary			Final		
Rank	Gymnast	Nation	Compulsory	Voluntary	Total	1/2 Prelim.	Final	Total
1st place, gold medalist(s)	Polina Astakhova	Soviet Union	9.800	9.833	19.633	9.816	9.800	19.616
2nd place, silver medalist(s)	Larisa Latynina	Soviet Union	9.700	9.733	19.433	9.716	9.700	19.416
3rd place, bronze medalist(s)	Tamara Zamotaylova	Soviet Union	9.566	9.700	19.266	9.633	9.766	19.399
4	Sofia Muratova	Soviet Union	9.633	9.666	19.299	9.649	9.733	19.382
5	Keiko Tanaka-Ikeda	Japan	9.533	9.733	19.266	9.633	9.700	19.333
6	Sonia Iovan	Romania	9.600	9.666	19.266	9.633	9.466	19.099
7	Lidiya Ivanova	Soviet Union	9.533	9.500	19.033	did not advance		
8	Doris Fuchs	United States	9.400	9.600	19.000	did not advance		
9	Natalia Kot	Poland	9.466	9.533	18.999	did not advance		
9	Miranda Cicognani	Italy	9.433	9.566	18.999	did not advance		
11	Ingrid Föst	United Team of Germany	9.433	9.533	18.966	did not advance		
11	Elena Leușteanu	Romania	9.400	9.566	18.966	did not advance		
11	Gizela Niedurny	Poland	9.366	9.600	18.966	did not advance		
11	Kiyoko Ono	Japan	9.400	9.566	18.966	did not advance		
15	Kimiko Tsukada	Japan	9.300	9.600	18.900	did not advance		
16	Rosella Cicognani	Italy	9.366	9.533	18.899	did not advance		
17	Eva Bosáková	Czechoslovakia	9.400	9.466	18.866	did not advance		
17	Rayna Grigorova	Bulgaria	9.466	9.400	18.866	did not advance		
19	Kazuko Sogabe	Japan	9.333	9.500	18.833	did not advance		
20	Margarita Nikolaeva	Soviet Union	9.333	9.466	18.799	did not advance		
21	Věra Čáslavská	Czechoslovakia	9.233	9.500	18.733	did not advance		
22	Emilia Vătășoiu	Romania	9.366	9.366	18.732	did not advance		
22	Elena Lagorara	Italy	9.366	9.366	18.732	did not advance		
24	Matylda Matoušková-Šínová	Czechoslovakia	9.266	9.400	18.666	did not advance		
24	Saltirka Spasova-Tarpova	Bulgaria	9.366	9.300	18.666	did not advance		
26	Ludmila Švédová	Czechoslovakia	9.400	9.233	18.633	did not advance		
27	Olga Tass	Hungary	9.333	9.300	18.633	did not advance		
28	Roselore Sonntag	United Team of Germany	9.166	9.466	18.632	did not advance		
29	Anikó Ducza	Hungary	9.200	9.400	18.600	did not advance		
29	Toshiko Shirasu-Aihara	Japan	9.300	9.300	18.600	did not advance		
31	Tereza Kočiš	Yugoslavia	9.300	9.266	18.566	did not advance		
31	Pirkko Nieminen	Finland	9.233	9.333	18.566	did not advance		
33	Danuta Nowak-Stachow	Poland	9.100	9.433	18.533	did not advance		
34	Uta Poreceanu	Romania	9.166	9.366	18.532	did not advance		
35	Ivanka Dolzheva	Bulgaria	9.300	9.200	18.500	did not advance		
36	Renate Schneider	United Team of Germany	9.166	9.333	18.499	did not advance		
37	Adolfína Tkačíková-Tačová	Czechoslovakia	9.166	9.300	18.466	did not advance		
37	Atanasia Ionescu	Romania	9.166	9.300	18.466	did not advance		
37	Judit Füle	Hungary	9.466	9.000	18.466	did not advance		
37	Barbara Eustachiewicz	Poland	9.233	9.233	18.466	did not advance		
37	Ginko Abukawa-Chiba	Japan	9.233	9.233	18.466	did not advance		
42	Ute Starke	United Team of Germany	9.400	9.033	18.433	did not advance		
42	Gretel Schiener	United Team of Germany	9.300	9.133	18.433	did not advance		
44	Danièle Sicot-Coulon	France	9.033	9.266	18.299	did not advance		
45	Klára Förstner	Hungary	9.000	9.266	18.266	did not advance		
46	Bep Ipenburg	Netherlands	8.933	9.300	18.233	did not advance		
47	Eryka Mondry-Kost	Poland	8.966	9.233	18.199	did not advance		
48	Tsvetanka Rangelova	Bulgaria	8.800	9.366	18.166	did not advance		
48	Karin Boldemann	United Team of Germany	9.300	8.866	18.166	did not advance		
50	Betty-Jean Maycock	United States	9.066	9.066	18.132	did not advance		
51	Ewa Rydell	Sweden	9.066	9.000	18.066	did not advance		
51	Gabriella Santarelli	Italy	9.300	8.766	18.066	did not advance		
53	Elena Mărgărit	Romania	9.033	9.000	18.033	did not advance		
53	Nevenka Pogačnik	Yugoslavia	8.933	9.100	18.033	did not advance		
55	Katalin Müller-Száll	Hungary	8.966	9.033	17.999	did not advance		
55	Tuovi Sappinen	Finland	8.833	9.166	17.999	did not advance		
55	Ruth Abeles	Israel	8.766	9.233	17.999	did not advance		
58	Gail Sontgerath	United States	9.066	8.900	17.966	did not advance		
58	Hana Růžičková	Czechoslovakia	8.966	9.000	17.966	did not advance		
58	Wanda Soprani	Italy	9.100	8.866	17.966	did not advance		
61	Elisaveta Mileva	Bulgaria	9.000	8.900	17.900	did not advance		
62	Brygida Dziuba	Poland	8.866	9.033	17.899	did not advance		
62	Mária Bencsik	Hungary	8.966	8.933	17.899	did not advance		
62	Ralli Ben-Yehuda	Israel	8.733	9.166	17.899	did not advance		
65	Teri Montefusco	United States	8.566	9.266	17.832	did not advance		
66	Jacqueline Dieudonné	France	9.000	8.800	17.800	did not advance		
66	Lineke Majolee	Netherlands	8.700	9.100	17.800	did not advance		
68	Miriam Kara	Israel	8.766	9.033	17.799	did not advance		
69	Stanka Pavlova	Bulgaria	8.633	9.133	17.766	did not advance		
70	Mirjana Bilić	Yugoslavia	9.333	8.400	17.733	did not advance		
71	Sharon Richardson	United States	8.600	9.066	17.666	did not advance		
72	Paulette le Raer	France	8.800	8.766	17.566	did not advance		
73	Anne-Marie Demortière	France	8.933	8.600	17.533	did not advance		
74	Waltraud Benesch	Austria	8.500	9.000	17.500	did not advance		
75	Nel Wambach	Netherlands	8.466	9.033	17.499	did not advance		
76	Ernestine Russell	Canada	8.533	8.933	17.466	did not advance		
77	Renée Hugon	France	8.700	8.700	17.400	did not advance		
78	Gerola Lindahl	Sweden	9.000	8.366	17.366	did not advance		
78	Antoinette Kuiters	South Africa	8.633	8.733	17.366	did not advance		
78	Nel Fritz	Netherlands	8.366	9.000	17.366	did not advance		
81	Yu Myeong-ja	South Korea	8.466	8.800	17.266	did not advance		
82	Kaye Breadsell	Australia	8.900	8.333	17.233	did not advance		
83	Monique Rossi	France	8.800	8.366	17.166	did not advance		
83	Ritva Salonen	Finland	8.400	8.766	17.166	did not advance		
85	Monica Elfvin	Sweden	9.000	8.133	17.133	did not advance		
86	Lena Adler	Sweden	8.766	8.333	17.099	did not advance		
86	Solveig Egman-Andersson	Sweden	8.433	8.666	17.099	did not advance		
88	Francesca Costa	Italy	8.900	8.133	17.033	did not advance		
88	Ria van Velsen	Netherlands	9.033	8.000	17.033	did not advance		
90	Ulla Lindström	Sweden	8.800	8.200	17.000	did not advance		
91	Muriel Grossfeld	United States	9.233	7.733	16.966	did not advance		
91	Raili Tuominen-Hämäläinen	Finland	8.000	8.966	16.966	did not advance		
91	Henriette Parzer	Austria	8.166	8.800	16.966	did not advance		
94	Kaarina Autio	Finland	8.400	8.500	16.900	did not advance		
95	Eira Lehtonen	Finland	8.666	8.166	16.832	did not advance		
96	Veronica Grymonprez	Belgium	8.566	8.233	16.799	did not advance		
97	Elfriede Hirnschall	Austria	8.366	8.166	16.532	did not advance		
98	Rita Van De Velde	Belgium	8.400	8.066	16.466	did not advance		
98	Erika Bogovic	Austria	7.866	8.600	16.466	did not advance		
100	Anni Cermak	Austria	7.800	8.566	16.366	did not advance		
101	Elena Artamendi	Spain	8.100	7.766	15.866	did not advance		
102	Godelieve Brys	Belgium	8.533	7.200	15.733	did not advance		
103	Renata Müller	Spain	7.833	7.800	15.633	did not advance		
104	Liliane Becker	Luxembourg	7.633	7.866	15.499	did not advance		
105	Ria Meyburg	Netherlands	5.966	8.900	14.866	did not advance		
106	Pat Perks	Great Britain	7.166	7.200	14.366	did not advance		
106	María del Carmen González	Spain	7.033	7.333	14.366	did not advance		
108	Margaret Thomas-Neale	Great Britain	6.900	7.400	14.300	did not advance		
109	Yvonne Stoffel-Wagener	Luxembourg	6.866	7.366	14.232	did not advance		
110	Rosa Balaguer	Spain	6.200	7.666	13.866	did not advance		
111	Marjorie Carter	Great Britain	6.833	6.666	13.499	did not advance		
112	Yolanda Williams	Cuba	6.200	7.166	13.366	did not advance		
113	Julia Uria	Cuba	6.066	7.133	13.199	did not advance		
114	Gwynedd Lewis-Lingard	Great Britain	6.500	6.666	13.166	did not advance		
115	Dália da Cunha-Sammer	Portugal	5.133	7.800	12.933	did not advance		
116	María Luisa Fernández	Spain	6.433	6.200	12.633	did not advance		
117	Montserrat Artamendi	Spain	5.700	6.833	12.533	did not advance		
118	Val Roberts	Australia	5.200	7.000	12.200	did not advance		
119	Jill Pollard	Great Britain	5.466	5.566	11.032	did not advance		
120	Esbela da Fonseca	Portugal	3.600	7.133	10.733	did not advance		
121	Louise Parker	Canada	7.033	3.500	10.533	did not advance		
122	Maria Helena Cunha	Portugal	2.666	6.433	9.099	did not advance		
123	Dorothy Summers	Great Britain	6.133	2.500	8.633	did not advance		
124	Hildegard Reitter	Austria	8.100	–	8.100	did not advance		
