= List of gymnasts at the 1960 Summer Olympics =

This is a list of the gymnasts who represented their country at the 1960 Summer Olympics in Rome from 25 August to 11 September 1960. Only one discipline, artistic gymnastics, was included in the Games.

== Female artistic gymnasts ==
	Name	Country	Date of birth (Age)
Youngest competitor	Elfriede Hirnschall	Austria	16 February 1945 (aged 15)
Oldest competitor	Dália da Cunha-Sammer	Portugal	26 December 1928 (aged 31)

NOC	Name	Date of birth (Age)	Hometown
Australia	Kaye Breadsell	2 January 1942 (aged 18)	Perth, Western Australia
Australia	Val Roberts	10 July 1938 (aged 22)	Ballarat, Victoria
Austria	Waltraud Benesch	5 January 1941 (aged 19)	Vienna, Austria
Austria	Erika Bogovic	3 January 1934 (aged 26)	Inzersdorf, Austria
Austria	Anni Cermak	18 June 1940 (aged 20)	
Austria	Elfriede Hirnschall	16 February 1945 (aged 15)	Vienna, Austria
Austria	Henriette Parzer	28 August 1943 (aged 16)	Vienna, Austria
Austria	Hildegard Reitter	1936	
Belgium	Godelieve Brys	24 April 1937 (aged 23)	Aalst, Belgium
Belgium	Veronica Grymonprez	17 January 1944 (aged 16)	Berlin, Germany
Belgium	Rita van de Velde	23 September 1941 (aged 18)	Schellebelle, Belgium
Bulgaria	Ivanka Dolzheva	10 September 1935 (aged 24)	Sofia, Bulgaria
Bulgaria	Rayna Grigorova	25 July 1931 (aged 29)	Varna, Bulgaria
Bulgaria	Elisaveta Mileva	10 July 1934 (aged 26)	Pudria, Bulgaria
Bulgaria	Stanka Pavlova	24 May 1938 (aged 22)	Sofia, Bulgaria
Bulgaria	Tsvetanka Rangelova	31 August 1938 (aged 21)	Dimitrovgrad, Bulgaria
Bulgaria	Saltirka Spasova-Tarpova	22 July 1933 (aged 27)	Gulyantsi, Bulgaria
Canada	Louise Parker	10 December 1942 (aged 17)	Montreal, Quebec
Canada	Ernestine Russell	6 October 1938 (aged 21)	Windsor, Ontario
Cuba	Julia Uria	31 January 1944 (aged 16)	San Germán, Cuba
Cuba	Yolanda Williams	15 July 1943 (aged 17)	Havana, Cuba
Czechoslovakia	Eva Bosáková	18 December 1931 (aged 28)	Mladá Boleslav, Czechoslovakia
Czechoslovakia	Věra Čáslavská	3 May 1942 (aged 18)	Prague, Czechoslovakia
Czechoslovakia	Matylda Matoušková-Šínová	29 March 1933 (aged 27)	Brno, Czechoslovakia
Czechoslovakia	Hana Růžičková	18 February 1941 (aged 19)	Třebotov, Czechoslovakia
Czechoslovakia	Ludmila Švédová	13 November 1936 (aged 23)	Šumperk, Czechoslovakia
Czechoslovakia	Adolfína Tkačíková-Tačová	19 April 1939 (aged 21)	Petřkovice, Czechoslovakia
Finland	Kaarina Autio	28 July 1941 (aged 19)	Vampula, Finland
Finland	Eira Lehtonen	22 January 1939 (aged 21)	Turku, Finland
Finland	Pirkko Nieminen	23 March 1939 (aged 21)	Tampere, Finland
Finland	Ritva Salonen	28 February 1936 (aged 24)	Tampere, Finland
Finland	Tuovi Sappinen	8 April 1941 (aged 19)	Turku, Finland
Finland	Raili Tuominen-Hämäläinen	13 October 1932 (aged 27)	Tampere, Finland
France	Anne-Marie Demortière	27 January 1938 (aged 22)	Le Creusot, France
France	Jacqueline Dieudonné	30 June 1933 (aged 27)	Mérignac, France
France	Renée Hugon	21 September 1930 (aged 29)	Clichy, France
France	Paulette le Raer	7 January 1932 (aged 28)	Saint-Malo, France
France	Monique Rossi	16 December 1937 (aged 22)	Montceau-les-Mines, France
France	Danièle Sicot-Coulon	24 March 1935 (aged 25)	Châteaudun, France
United Team of Germany	Karin Boldemann	6 October 1940 (aged 19)	Berlin, Germany
United Team of Germany	Ingrid Föst	9 November 1934 (aged 25)	Potsdam, Germany
United Team of Germany	Gretel Schiener	9 April 1940 (aged 20)	Altenburg, Germany
United Team of Germany	Renate Schneider	3 May 1939 (aged 21)	Berlin, Germany
United Team of Germany	Roselore Sonntag	6 February 1934 (aged 26)	Geringswalde, Germany
United Team of Germany	Ute Starke	14 January 1939 (aged 21)	Eisleben, Germany
Great Britain	Gwynedd Lewis-Lingard	28 December 1934 (aged 25)	Cardiff, Wales
Great Britain	Pat Perks	1 May 1940 (aged 20)	Cardiff, Wales
Great Britain	Jill Pollard	21 July 1935 (aged 25)	Bradford, West Yorkshire
Great Britain	Marjorie Carter	10 May 1934 (aged 26)	Bradford, West Yorkshire
Great Britain	Dorothy Summers	29 September 1941 (aged 18)	Cardiff, Wales
Great Britain	Margaret Thomas-Neale	22 August 1931 (aged 29)	Cardiff, Wales
Hungary	Mária Bencsik	10 November 1939 (aged 20)	Budapest, Hungary
Hungary	Anikó Ducza	8 August 1942 (aged 18)	Budapest, Hungary
Hungary	Klára Förstner	29 April 1942 (aged 18)	Budapest, Hungary
Hungary	Judit Füle	2 October 1941 (aged 18)	Cegléd, Hungary
Hungary	Katalin Müller-Száll	13 September 1943 (aged 16)	Budapest, Hungary
Hungary	Olga Tass	29 March 1929 (aged 31)	Pécs, Hungary
Israel	Ruth Abeles	7 August 1942 (aged 18)	Haifa, Mandatory Palestine
Israel	Ralli Ben-Yehuda	26 September 1934 (aged 25)	Tel Aviv, Mandatory Palestine
Israel	Miriam Kara	3 December 1938 (aged 21)	Jerusalem, Mandatory Palestine
Italy	Miranda Cicognani	12 September 1936 (aged 23)	Forlì, Italy
Italy	Rosella Cicognani	1 October 1939 (aged 20)	Forlì, Italy
Italy	Francesca Costa	16 February 1936 (aged 24)	Lodi, Italy
Italy	Elena Lagorara	10 May 1939 (aged 21)	Sestri Ponente, Italy
Italy	Gabriella Santarelli	2 March 1936 (aged 24)	Forlì, Italy
Italy	Wanda Soprani	9 March 1940 (aged 20)	Forlì, Italy
Japan	Ginko Abukawa-Chiba	25 February 1938 (aged 22)	Akita Prefecture, Japan
Japan	Kiyoko Ono	4 February 1936 (aged 24)	Iwanuma, Japan
Japan	Toshiko Shirasu-Aihara	3 June 1939 (aged 21)	Mihara, Japan
Japan	Kazuko Sogabe	27 March 1936 (aged 24)	Kagawa Prefecture, Japan
Japan	Keiko Tanaka-Ikeda	11 November 1933 (aged 26)	Mihara, Japan
Japan	Kimiko Tsukada	26 October 1937 (aged 22)	Aichi Prefecture, Japan
Luxembourg	Liliane Becker	9 November 1942 (aged 17)	Luxembourg City, Luxembourg
Luxembourg	Yvonne Stoffel-Wagener	16 May 1931 (aged 29)	Esch-sur-Alzette, Luxembourg
Netherlands	Nel Fritz	4 June 1937 (aged 23)	Vlissingen, Netherlands
Netherlands	Bep Ipenburg	21 June 1936 (aged 24)	Zandvoort, Netherlands
Netherlands	Lineke Majolee	30 September 1938 (aged 21)	Heiloo, Netherlands
Netherlands	Ria Meyburg	7 January 1939 (aged 21)	Vlissingen, Netherlands
Netherlands	Ria van Velsen	18 May 1939 (aged 21)	Bodegraven, Netherlands
Netherlands	Nel Wambach	9 May 1938 (aged 22)	Rotterdam, Netherlands
Poland	Brygida Dziuba	11 February 1939 (aged 21)	Nowy Bytom, Poland
Poland	Barbara Eustachiewicz	5 November 1938 (aged 21)	Katowice, Poland
Poland	Natalia Kot	29 June 1938 (aged 22)	Siemianowice Śląskie, Poland
Poland	Eryka Mondry-Kost	18 January 1940 (aged 20)	Ruda Śląska, Poland
Poland	Gizela Niedurny	31 January 1939 (aged 21)	Nowy Bytom, Poland
Poland	Danuta Nowak-Stachow	22 August 1934 (aged 26)	Gdynia, Poland
Portugal	Maria Helena Cunha	19 December 1943 (aged 16)	Paredes, Portugal
Portugal	Esbela da Fonseca	26 July 1942 (aged 18)	Lisbon, Portugal
Portugal	Dália da Cunha-Sammer	26 December 1928 (aged 31)	Lisbon, Portugal
Romania	Atanasia Ionescu	19 March 1935 (aged 25)	Ploiești, Romania
Romania	Sonia Iovan	29 September 1935 (aged 24)	Cluj-Napoca, Romania
Romania	Elena Leușteanu	4 July 1935 (aged 25)	Chernivtsi, Ukrainian SSR
Romania	Elena Mărgărit	25 October 1936 (aged 23)	Timișoara, Romania
Romania	Uta Poreceanu	13 November 1936 (aged 23)	Brașov, Romania
Romania	Emilia Vătășoiu	20 October 1933 (aged 26)	Câineni, Romania
South Africa	Antoinette Kuiters	11 September 1939 (aged 20)	Schiedam, Netherlands
South Korea	Yu Myeong-ja	2 April 1943 (aged 17)	Chungcheongnam, South Korea
Soviet Union	Polina Astakhova	30 October 1936 (aged 23)	Zaporizhzhia, Ukrainian SSR
Soviet Union	Lidiya Ivanova	27 January 1937 (aged 23)	Moscow, Russian SFSR
Soviet Union	Larisa Latynina	27 December 1934 (aged 25)	Kherson, Ukrainian SSR
Soviet Union	Sofia Muratova	13 July 1929 (aged 31)	Saint Petersburg, Russian SFSR
Soviet Union	Margarita Nikolaeva	23 September 1935 (aged 24)	Ivanovo, Russian SFSR
Soviet Union	Tamara Zamotaylova	11 May 1939 (aged 21)	Mishenka, Russian SFSR
Spain	Elena Artamendi	7 August 1939 (aged 21)	Barcelona, Spain
Spain	Montserrat Artamendi	17 September 1941 (aged 18)	Barcelona, Spain
Spain	Rosa Balaguer	12 November 1941 (aged 18)	Barcelona, Spain
Spain	María Luisa Fernández	7 March 1943 (aged 17)	Oviedo, Spain
Spain	María del Carmen González	6 April 1941 (aged 19)	Madrid, Spain
Spain	Renata Müller	11 February 1937 (aged 23)	Neunburg vorm Wald, Germany
Sweden	Lena Adler	24 October 1941 (aged 18)	Gothenburg, Sweden
Sweden	Solveig Egman-Andersson	6 January 1942 (aged 18)	Arvika, Sweden
Sweden	Monica Elfvin	22 November 1938 (aged 21)	Gothenburg, Sweden
Sweden	Gerola Lindahl	20 July 1943 (aged 17)	Stockholm, Sweden
Sweden	Ulla Lindström	17 April 1943 (aged 17)	Huskvarna, Sweden
Sweden	Ewa Rydell	26 February 1942 (aged 18)	Gothenburg, Sweden
United States	Doris Fuchs	11 June 1938 (aged 22)	Villingen, Germany
United States	Muriel Grossfeld	7 October 1940 (aged 19)	Speedway, Indiana
United States	Betty-Jean Maycock	13 December 1942 (aged 17)	Cleveland, Ohio
United States	Teri Montefusco	18 June 1941 (aged 19)	Peoria, Illinois
United States	Sharon Richardson	26 May 1943 (aged 17)	Albion, Wisconsin
United States	Gail Sontgerath	11 March 1944 (aged 16)	Dover, New Jersey
Yugoslavia	Mirjana Bilić	11 May 1936 (aged 24)	Bačka Topola, Yugoslavia
Yugoslavia	Tereza Kočiš	27 April 1934 (aged 26)	Sombor, Yugoslavia
Yugoslavia	Nevenka Pogačnik	14 April 1936 (aged 24)	Ljubljana, Yugoslavia

== Male artistic gymnasts ==
	Name	Country	Date of birth (Age)
Youngest competitor	Franco Menichelli	Italy	3 August 1941 (aged 19)
Oldest competitor	Masao Takemoto	Japan	29 September 1919 (aged 40)

NOC	Name	Date of birth (Age)	Hometown
Argentina	Juan Caviglia	28 November 1929 (aged 30)	Córdoba, Argentina
Australia	Graham Bond	6 May 1937 (aged 23)	Wondai, Queensland
Australia	Benjamin de Roo	11 February 1940 (aged 20)	Enschede, Netherlands
Austria	Anton Hertl	12 May 1921 (aged 39)	Graz, Austria
Austria	Gerhard Huber	20 January 1934 (aged 26)	Salzburg, Austria
Austria	Willi Kafel	6 July 1930 (aged 30)	Vuzenica, Yugoslavia
Austria	Hermann Klien	22 October 1932 (aged 27)	
Austria	Johann König	21 September 1932 (aged 27)	Bregenz, Austria
Austria	Hans Sauter	6 June 1925 (aged 35)	Bregenz, Austria
Belgium	Léopold Desmet	15 July 1935 (aged 25)	Brussels, Belgium
Belgium	René Marteaux	3 August 1929 (aged 31)	Saint-Gilles, Belgium
Bulgaria	Todor Bachvarov	8 January 1936 (aged 24)	Yambol, Bulgaria
Bulgaria	Velik Kapsazov	15 April 1935 (aged 25)	Asenovgrad, Bulgaria
Bulgaria	Georgi Khristov	28 April 1938 (aged 22)	Ruse, Bulgaria
Bulgaria	Ljuben Khristov	15 July 1935 (aged 25)	Sofia, Bulgaria
Bulgaria	Nikola Prodanov	26 May 1940 (aged 20)	Burgas, Bulgaria
Bulgaria	Stoyan Stoyanov	25 October 1931 (aged 28)	Nikolovo, Bulgaria
Canada	Richard Montpetit	11 October 1939 (aged 20)	Verdun, Quebec
Czechoslovakia	Jaroslav Bím	12 January 1931 (aged 29)	Kyjov, Czechoslovakia
Czechoslovakia	Ferdinand Daniš	7 January 1929 (aged 31)	Lučenec, Czechoslovakia
Czechoslovakia	Pavel Gajdoš	1 October 1936 (aged 23)	Velykyi Bereznyi, Ukrainian SSR
Czechoslovakia	Ladislav Pazdera	6 December 1936 (aged 23)	Radostice, Czechoslovakia
Czechoslovakia	Jaroslav Šťastný	6 April 1936 (aged 24)	Penčice, Czechoslovakia
Czechoslovakia	Josef Trmal	12 March 1932 (aged 28)	Prague, Czechoslovakia
Finland	Eugen Ekman	27 October 1937 (aged 22)	Vaasa, Finland
Finland	Kauko Heikkinen	3 March 1938 (aged 22)	Pielisjärvi, Finland
Finland	Raimo Heinonen	29 May 1935 (aged 25)	Turku, Finland
Finland	Otto Kestola	20 May 1936 (aged 24)	Vyborg, Finland
Finland	Olavi Leimuvirta	26 November 1935 (aged 24)	Helsinki, Finland
Finland	Sakari Olkkonen	15 January 1931 (aged 29)	Vyborg, Finland
France	Robert Caymaris	27 September 1935 (aged 24)	Algiers, Algeria
France	Bernard Fauqueux	2 September 1938 (aged 21)	Vernon, France
France	Jean Jaillard	6 October 1931 (aged 28)	Carpentras, France
France	Mohamed Lazhari	28 April 1938 (aged 22)	Algiers, Algeria
France	Michel Mathiot	23 August 1926 (aged 34)	Besançon, France
France	Daniel Touche	16 July 1939 (aged 21)	Versailles, France
United Team of Germany	Karl-Heinz Friedrich	31 July 1934 (aged 26)	Zwickau, Germany
United Team of Germany	Siegfried Fülle	6 October 1939 (aged 20)	Greiz, Germany
United Team of Germany	Philipp Fürst	8 November 1936 (aged 23)	Oppau, Germany
United Team of Germany	Erwin Koppe	29 March 1938 (aged 22)	Rosenheim, Germany
United Team of Germany	Günter Lyhs	20 April 1934 (aged 26)	Sulimy, Poland
United Team of Germany	Günter Nachtigall	5 March 1930 (aged 30)	Blankenburg, Germany
Great Britain	Ken Buffin	1 November 1923 (aged 36)	Barry, Wales
Great Britain	Dick Gradley	6 March 1932 (aged 28)	London, England
Great Britain	John Mulhall	18 August 1938 (aged 22)	Cardiff, Wales
Great Britain	Jack Pancott	1 April 1933 (aged 27)	Farnborough, England
Great Britain	Peter Starling	15 August 1925 (aged 35)	Norwich, England
Great Britain	Nik Stuart	20 July 1927 (aged 33)	Thirsk, England
Hungary	Géza Bejek	20 April 1934 (aged 26)	Székesfehérvár, Hungary
Hungary	Sándor Békési	27 August 1928 (aged 31)	Debrecen, Hungary
Hungary	Rajmund Csányi	22 April 1936 (aged 24)	Bucharest, Romania
Hungary	Rudolf Keszthelyi	29 March 1935 (aged 25)	Pécs, Hungary
Hungary	János Mester	8 February 1938 (aged 22)	Budapest, Hungary
Hungary	Lajos Varga	23 November 1933 (aged 26)	Gyoma, Hungary
Italy	Giovanni Carminucci	14 November 1939 (aged 20)	San Benedetto del Tronto, Italy
Italy	Pasquale Carminucci	29 August 1937 (aged 22)	San Benedetto del Tronto, Italy
Italy	Gianfranco Marzolla	9 January 1937 (aged 23)	Donada, Italy
Italy	Franco Menichelli	3 August 1941 (aged 19)	Rome, Italy
Italy	Orlando Polmonari	11 March 1924 (aged 36)	Ferrara, Italy
Italy	Angelo Vicardi	9 October 1936 (aged 23)	Melegnano, Italy
Japan	Nobuyuki Aihara	16 December 1934 (aged 25)	Takasaki, Japan
Japan	Yukio Endō	18 January 1937 (aged 23)	Akita, Japan
Japan	Takashi Mitsukuri	19 February 1939 (aged 21)	Toyama Prefecture, Japan
Japan	Takashi Ono	26 July 1931 (aged 29)	Noshiro, Japan
Japan	Masao Takemoto	29 September 1919 (aged 40)	Hamada, Japan
Japan	Shuji Tsurumi	29 January 1938 (aged 22)	Tokyo, Japan
Luxembourg	Marcel Coppin	27 April 1928 (aged 32)	Paris, France
Luxembourg	François Eisenbarth	27 March 1928 (aged 32)	Rumelange, Luxembourg
Luxembourg	Hubert Erang	4 March 1931 (aged 29)	Esch-sur-Alzette, Luxembourg
Luxembourg	Armand Huberty	16 August 1930 (aged 30)	Esch-sur-Alzette, Luxembourg
Luxembourg	Michel Kiesgen	15 September 1933 (aged 26)	Luxembourg City, Luxembourg
Luxembourg	Josy Stoffel	27 June 1928 (aged 32)	Differdange, Luxembourg
Mexico	Armando Valles	6 May 1941 (aged 19)	Mexico City, Mexico
Morocco	Ahmed Fellat	1929	Rabat, Morocco
Morocco	Kacem Klifa	1940	Casablanca, Morocco
Morocco	Miloud M'Sellek	1937	Casablanca, Morocco
Morocco	Abdesselem Regragui	1939	Rabat, Morocco
Morocco	Mohamed Sekkat	1937	Fez, Morocco
Morocco	Darif Tanjaoui	1939	Casablanca, Morocco
Norway	Åge Storhaug	5 April 1938 (aged 22)	Klepp, Norway
Poland	Ernest Hawełek	28 January 1935 (aged 25)	Radlin, Poland
Poland	Jerzy Jokiel	9 August 1931 (aged 29)	Ruda Śląska, Poland
Poland	Andrzej Konopka	1 September 1934 (aged 25)	Sandomierz, Poland
Poland	Alfred Kucharczyk	2 November 1937 (aged 22)	Radlin, Poland
Poland	Józef Rajnisz	3 March 1932 (aged 28)	Bytom, Poland
Poland	Aleksander Rokosa	17 July 1936 (aged 24)	Brzeziny, Poland
Portugal	Hermenegildo Candeias	17 April 1934 (aged 26)	Oeiras, Portugal
South Korea	Kim Sang-guk	1 December 1934 (aged 25)	Seoul, South Korea
Soviet Union	Albert Azaryan	11 March 1929 (aged 31)	Ganja, Azerbaijan SSR
Soviet Union	Valery Kerdemelidi	18 July 1938 (aged 22)	Tver, Russian SFSR
Soviet Union	Nikolai Miligulo	27 December 1936 (aged 23)	Minsk, Byelorussian SSR
Soviet Union	Vladimir Portnoy	9 June 1931 (aged 29)	Odessa, Ukrainian SSR
Soviet Union	Boris Shakhlin	27 January 1932 (aged 28)	Ishim, Russian SFSR
Soviet Union	Yuri Titov	27 November 1935 (aged 24)	Omsk, Russian SFSR
Spain	Jaime Belenguer	23 June 1937 (aged 23)	Valencia, Spain
Spain	Ramón García	14 February 1940 (aged 20)	Madrid, Spain
Spain	Emilio Lecuona	30 August 1935 (aged 24)	Barcelona, Spain
Spain	Hermenegildo Martínez	13 August 1937 (aged 23)	Melilla, Spain
Spain	Enrique Montserrat	19 September 1935 (aged 24)	Barcelona, Spain
Spain	Luis Valbuena	26 January 1936 (aged 24)	Barcelona, Spain
Sweden	Jean Cronstedt	6 October 1932 (aged 27)	Helsinki, Finland
Sweden	Leif Korn	26 July 1937 (aged 23)	Stockholm, Sweden
Sweden	Stig Lindewall	15 August 1936 (aged 24)	Adelsö, Sweden
Sweden	William Thoresson	31 May 1932 (aged 28)	Gothenburg, Sweden
Sweden	Kurt Wigartz	21 March 1933 (aged 27)	Mariestad, Sweden
Sweden	Bo Wirhed	11 November 1935 (aged 24)	Hedemora, Sweden
Switzerland	Max Benker	8 December 1932 (aged 27)	Zürich, Switzerland
Switzerland	André Brüllmann	7 August 1934 (aged 26)	Geneva, Switzerland
Switzerland	Fritz Feuz	28 April 1931 (aged 29)	Wilderswil, Switzerland
Switzerland	Ernst Fivian	12 August 1931 (aged 29)	Thun, Switzerland
Switzerland	Hans Schwarzentruber	25 March 1929 (aged 31)	Lucerne, Switzerland
Switzerland	Edy Thomi	9 June 1929 (aged 31)	Brig, Switzerland
United Arab Republic	Ismail Abdallah	1933	Cairo, Egypt
United Arab Republic	Ahmed Issam Allam	13 September 1931 (aged 28)	Cairo, Egypt
United Arab Republic	Ahmed Dakkeli	1936	Cairo, Egypt
United Arab Republic	Selim El-Sayed	1936	Dyarb Negm, Egypt
United Arab Republic	Ahmed Goneim	1937	Cairo, Egypt
United Arab Republic	Abdel Vares Sharraf	1934	Cairo, Egypt
United States	Larry Banner	6 June 1936 (aged 24)	Van Nuys, California
United States	Jack Beckner	9 June 1930 (aged 30)	Los Angeles, California
United States	Abie Grossfeld	1 March 1934 (aged 26)	New York, New York
United States	Gar O'Quinn	1 July 1935 (aged 25)	Fort Worth, Texas
United States	Fred Orlofsky	8 April 1937 (aged 23)	North Bergen, New Jersey
United States	Don Tonry	24 November 1935 (aged 24)	Brooklyn, New York
Yugoslavia	Ivan Čaklec	5 August 1932 (aged 28)	Varaždin, Yugoslavia
Yugoslavia	Miroslav Cerar	28 October 1939 (aged 20)	Ljubljana, Yugoslavia
Yugoslavia	Dragan Gagić	9 December 1935 (aged 24)	Vinča, Yugoslavia
Yugoslavia	Milenko Lekić	5 April 1936 (aged 24)	Subotica, Yugoslavia
Yugoslavia	Marsel Markulin	29 October 1936 (aged 23)	Zagreb, Yugoslavia
Yugoslavia	Alojz Petrovič	12 May 1936 (aged 24)	Čepin, Yugoslavia
