= Gymnastics at the 1960 Summer Olympics – Women's balance beam =

Women's balance beam at the Games of the XVII Olympiad
- Date: 6–8 September 1960
- Competitors: 124 from 28 nations
- Winning score: 19.283

Medalists
1st place, gold medalist(s)		Eva Bosáková	Czechoslovakia
2nd place, silver medalist(s)		Larisa Latynina	Soviet Union
3rd place, bronze medalist(s)		Sofia Muratova	Soviet Union

These are the results of the women's balance beam competition, one of six events for female competitors in artistic gymnastics at the 1960 Summer Olympics in Rome.

== Competition format ==
The gymnastics all-around events continued to use the aggregation format. Each nation entered a team of six gymnasts or up to three individual gymnasts. All entrants in the gymnastics competitions performed both a compulsory exercise and a voluntary exercise for each apparatus. The scores for all 8 exercises were summed to give an individual all-around score.

These exercise scores were also used for qualification for the new apparatus finals. The two exercises (compulsory and voluntary) for each apparatus were summed to give an apparatus score; the top 6 in each apparatus participated in the finals; others were ranked 7th through 124th. For the apparatus finals, the all-around score for that apparatus was multiplied by one-half then added to the final round exercise score to give a final total.

Exercise scores ranged from 0 to 10, with the final total apparatus score from 0 to 20.

== Results ==
Rank	Gymnast	Nation	Preliminary			Final		
Rank	Gymnast	Nation	Compulsory	Voluntary	Total	1/2 Prelim.	Final	Total
1st place, gold medalist(s)	Eva Bosáková	Czechoslovakia	9.400	9.766	19.166	9.583	9.700	19.283
2nd place, silver medalist(s)	Larisa Latynina	Soviet Union	9.366	9.700	19.066	9.533	9.700	19.233
3rd place, bronze medalist(s)	Sofia Muratova	Soviet Union	9.466	9.666	19.132	9.566	9.666	19.232
4	Margarita Nikolaeva	Soviet Union	9.400	9.566	18.966	9.483	9.700	19.183
5	Keiko Tanaka-Ikeda	Japan	9.266	9.666	18.932	9.466	9.666	19.132
6	Věra Čáslavská	Czechoslovakia	9.233	9.533	18.766	9.383	9.700	19.083
7	Ingrid Föst	United Team of Germany	9.300	9.400	18.700	did not advance		
8	Lidiya Ivanova	Soviet Union	9.233	9.466	18.699	did not advance		
9	Rayna Grigorova	Bulgaria	9.200	9.466	18.666	did not advance		
10	Ludmila Švédová	Czechoslovakia	9.200	9.433	18.633	did not advance		
11	Sonia Iovan	Romania	9.200	9.400	18.600	did not advance		
12	Toshiko Shirasu-Aihara	Japan	9.266	9.200	18.466	did not advance		
12	Ute Starke	United Team of Germany	9.066	9.400	18.466	did not advance		
14	Kazuko Sogabe	Japan	8.900	9.533	18.433	did not advance		
15	Adolfína Tkačíková-Tačová	Czechoslovakia	9.166	9.266	18.432	did not advance		
16	Judit Füle	Hungary	9.000	9.200	18.400	did not advance		
17	Miranda Cicognani	Italy	9.000	9.366	18.366	did not advance		
17	Elena Leușteanu	Romania	9.066	9.300	18.366	did not advance		
17	Kiyoko Ono	Japan	9.066	9.300	18.366	did not advance		
17	Katalin Müller-Száll	Hungary	9.300	9.066	18.366	did not advance		
21	Natalia Kot	Poland	8.900	9.433	18.333	did not advance		
21	Roselore Sonntag	United Team of Germany	9.133	9.200	18.333	did not advance		
21	Atanasia Ionescu	Romania	9.133	9.200	18.333	did not advance		
21	Gretel Schiener	United Team of Germany	9.100	9.233	18.333	did not advance		
21	Gail Sontgerath	United States	9.000	9.333	18.333	did not advance		
26	Eryka Mondry-Kost	Poland	9.000	9.300	18.300	did not advance		
26	Hana Růžičková	Czechoslovakia	9.100	9.200	18.300	did not advance		
28	Polina Astakhova	Soviet Union	9.500	8.733	18.233	did not advance		
28	Emilia Vătășoiu	Romania	9.000	9.233	18.233	did not advance		
28	Barbara Eustachiewicz	Poland	9.000	9.233	18.233	did not advance		
28	Ulla Lindström	Sweden	9.033	9.200	18.233	did not advance		
32	Danuta Nowak-Stachow	Poland	8.966	9.266	18.232	did not advance		
33	Matylda Matoušková-Šínová	Czechoslovakia	9.000	9.200	18.200	did not advance		
34	Kimiko Tsukada	Japan	8.833	9.366	18.199	did not advance		
35	Uta Poreceanu	Romania	8.933	9.233	18.166	did not advance		
36	Tereza Kočiš	Yugoslavia	8.833	9.233	18.066	did not advance		
36	Stanka Pavlova	Bulgaria	8.933	9.133	18.066	did not advance		
36	Anne-Marie Demortière	France	9.166	8.900	18.066	did not advance		
39	Klára Förstner	Hungary	9.000	9.000	18.000	did not advance		
40	Ewa Rydell	Sweden	8.966	9.033	17.999	did not advance		
40	Wanda Soprani	Italy	9.066	8.933	17.999	did not advance		
40	Mirjana Bilić	Yugoslavia	8.933	9.066	17.999	did not advance		
43	Jacqueline Dieudonné	France	9.133	8.833	17.966	did not advance		
44	Elisaveta Mileva	Bulgaria	8.966	8.966	17.932	did not advance		
45	Saltirka Spasova-Tarpova	Bulgaria	8.900	8.966	17.866	did not advance		
45	Monica Elfvin	Sweden	8.866	9.000	17.866	did not advance		
47	Mária Bencsik	Hungary	9.066	8.766	17.832	did not advance		
48	Gerola Lindahl	Sweden	8.933	8.850	17.783	did not advance		
49	Betty-Jean Maycock	United States	8.600	9.166	17.766	did not advance		
50	Teri Montefusco	United States	8.533	9.166	17.699	did not advance		
51	Ivanka Dolzheva	Bulgaria	8.633	9.033	17.666	did not advance		
52	Solveig Egman-Andersson	Sweden	8.900	8.700	17.600	did not advance		
53	Sharon Richardson	United States	8.366	9.233	17.599	did not advance		
54	Lena Adler	Sweden	8.666	8.900	17.566	did not advance		
55	Doris Fuchs	United States	9.066	8.400	17.466	did not advance		
55	Elfriede Hirnschall	Austria	8.666	8.800	17.466	did not advance		
57	Anikó Ducza	Hungary	8.166	9.233	17.399	did not advance		
57	Renate Schneider	United Team of Germany	9.133	8.266	17.399	did not advance		
59	Francesca Costa	Italy	8.700	8.600	17.300	did not advance		
60	Rosella Cicognani	Italy	9.066	8.233	17.299	did not advance		
61	Pirkko Nieminen	Finland	8.266	9.000	17.266	did not advance		
61	Brygida Dziuba	Poland	9.066	8.200	17.266	did not advance		
63	Paulette le Raer	France	8.600	8.600	17.200	did not advance		
64	Ginko Abukawa-Chiba	Japan	9.000	8.166	17.166	did not advance		
64	Monique Rossi	France	8.700	8.466	17.166	did not advance		
66	Muriel Grossfeld	United States	8.900	8.200	17.100	did not advance		
67	Eira Lehtonen	Finland	8.033	9.066	17.099	did not advance		
68	Danièle Sicot-Coulon	France	9.000	8.033	17.033	did not advance		
68	Ernestine Russell	Canada	8.833	8.200	17.033	did not advance		
68	Nel Fritz	Netherlands	8.033	9.000	17.033	did not advance		
68	Ria Meyburg	Netherlands	8.100	8.933	17.033	did not advance		
72	Tsvetanka Rangelova	Bulgaria	9.066	7.966	17.032	did not advance		
72	Gabriella Santarelli	Italy	8.966	8.066	17.032	did not advance		
74	Olga Tass	Hungary	9.033	7.966	16.999	did not advance		
75	Gizela Niedurny	Poland	9.000	7.983	16.983	did not advance		
76	Lineke Majolee	Netherlands	8.000	8.866	16.966	did not advance		
77	Karin Boldemann	United Team of Germany	9.000	7.933	16.933	did not advance		
78	Bep Ipenburg	Netherlands	8.133	8.766	16.899	did not advance		
79	Waltraud Benesch	Austria	8.200	8.666	16.866	did not advance		
80	Nel Wambach	Netherlands	7.900	8.900	16.800	did not advance		
81	Tuovi Sappinen	Finland	7.800	8.900	16.700	did not advance		
82	Antoinette Kuiters	South Africa	8.100	8.533	16.633	did not advance		
83	Elena Lagorara	Italy	8.700	7.900	16.600	did not advance		
84	Miriam Kara	Israel	7.800	8.700	16.500	did not advance		
85	Ritva Salonen	Finland	7.566	8.800	16.366	did not advance		
86	Ralli Ben-Yehuda	Israel	7.600	8.666	16.266	did not advance		
87	Godelieve Brys	Belgium	7.933	8.300	16.233	did not advance		
88	Kaarina Autio	Finland	7.400	8.800	16.200	did not advance		
89	Erika Bogovic	Austria	7.600	8.433	16.033	did not advance		
90	Liliane Becker	Luxembourg	7.533	8.400	15.933	did not advance		
91	Elena Mărgărit	Romania	6.800	9.066	15.866	did not advance		
91	Raili Tuominen-Hämäläinen	Finland	8.000	7.866	15.866	did not advance		
93	Rita Van De Velde	Belgium	7.733	8.033	15.766	did not advance		
94	Nevenka Pogačnik	Yugoslavia	8.233	7.500	15.733	did not advance		
95	Veronica Grymonprez	Belgium	8.033	7.666	15.699	did not advance		
96	Renée Hugon	France	7.833	7.633	15.466	did not advance		
97	Henriette Parzer	Austria	8.333	7.066	15.399	did not advance		
98	Elena Artamendi	Spain	7.600	7.766	15.366	did not advance		
99	Val Roberts	Australia	7.066	8.233	15.299	did not advance		
100	Rosa Balaguer	Spain	7.400	7.866	15.266	did not advance		
101	Gwynedd Lewis-Lingard	Great Britain	7.366	7.833	15.199	did not advance		
102	Yu Myeong-ja	South Korea	7.333	7.833	15.166	did not advance		
102	Kaye Breadsell	Australia	7.800	7.366	15.166	did not advance		
104	Margaret Thomas-Neale	Great Britain	7.433	7.633	15.066	did not advance		
105	Jill Pollard	Great Britain	7.366	7.500	14.866	did not advance		
106	Pat Perks	Great Britain	7.433	7.400	14.833	did not advance		
107	Montserrat Artamendi	Spain	7.400	7.266	14.666	did not advance		
108	Ruth Abeles	Israel	6.900	7.700	14.600	did not advance		
108	Dorothy Summers	Great Britain	7.500	7.100	14.600	did not advance		
110	Dália da Cunha-Sammer	Portugal	6.400	8.166	14.566	did not advance		
111	Yvonne Stoffel-Wagener	Luxembourg	6.533	8.000	14.533	did not advance		
112	Anni Cermak	Austria	7.933	6.583	14.516	did not advance		
113	Marjorie Carter	Great Britain	7.166	7.266	14.432	did not advance		
113	Maria Helena Cunha	Portugal	6.966	7.466	14.432	did not advance		
115	María Luisa Fernández	Spain	7.766	6.333	14.099	did not advance		
116	Renata Müller	Spain	6.433	7.533	13.966	did not advance		
117	Esbela da Fonseca	Portugal	6.933	6.833	13.766	did not advance		
118	María del Carmen González	Spain	7.333	6.200	13.533	did not advance		
119	Louise Parker	Canada	6.733	6.066	12.799	did not advance		
120	Yolanda Williams	Cuba	4.000	7.333	11.333	did not advance		
121	Julia Uria	Cuba	3.833	5.966	9.799	did not advance		
122	Tamara Zamotaylova	Soviet Union	9.533	–	9.533	did not advance		
123	Hildegard Reitter	Austria	7.800	–	7.800	did not advance		
124	Ria van Velsen	Netherlands	7.666	–	7.666	did not advance		
