= Gymnastics at the 1960 Summer Olympics – Women's vault =

Women's vault at the Games of the XVII Olympiad
- Date: 6–8 September 1960
- Competitors: 124 from 28 nations
- Winning score: 19.316

Medalists
1st place, gold medalist(s)		Margarita Nikolaeva	Soviet Union
2nd place, silver medalist(s)		Sofia Muratova	Soviet Union
3rd place, bronze medalist(s)		Larisa Latynina	Soviet Union

These are the results of the women's vault competition, one of six events for female competitors in artistic gymnastics at the 1960 Summer Olympics in Rome.

== Competition format ==
The gymnastics all-around events continued to use the aggregation format. Each nation entered a team of six gymnasts or up to three individual gymnasts. All entrants in the gymnastics competitions performed both a compulsory exercise and a voluntary exercise for each apparatus. The scores for all 8 exercises were summed to give an individual all-around score.

These exercise scores were also used for qualification for the new apparatus finals. The two exercises (compulsory and voluntary) for each apparatus were summed to give an apparatus score; the top 6 in each apparatus participated in the finals; others were ranked 7th through 124th. For the apparatus finals, the all-around score for that apparatus was multiplied by one-half then added to the final round exercise score to give a final total.

Exercise scores ranged from 0 to 10, with the final total apparatus score from 0 to 20.

== Results ==
Rank	Gymnast	Nation	Preliminary			Final		
Rank	Gymnast	Nation	Compulsory	Voluntary	Total	1/2 Prelim.	Final	Total
1st place, gold medalist(s)	Margarita Nikolaeva	Soviet Union	9.500	9.600	19.100	9.550	9.766	19.316
2nd place, silver medalist(s)	Sofia Muratova	Soviet Union	9.566	9.466	19.032	9.516	9.533	19.049
3rd place, bronze medalist(s)	Larisa Latynina	Soviet Union	9.533	9.433	18.966	9.483	9.533	19.016
4	Adolfína Tkačíková-Tačová	Czechoslovakia	9.466	9.300	18.766	9.383	9.400	18.783
5	Sonia Iovan	Romania	9.466	9.266	18.732	9.366	9.400	18.766
6	Polina Astakhova	Soviet Union	9.466	9.300	18.766	9.383	9.333	18.716
7	Věra Čáslavská	Czechoslovakia	9.433	9.266	18.699	did not advance		
8	Lidiya Ivanova	Soviet Union	9.300	9.266	18.566	did not advance		
9	Sharon Richardson	United States	9.200	9.333	18.533	did not advance		
10	Ingrid Föst	United Team of Germany	9.133	9.366	18.499	did not advance		
10	Ludmila Švédová	Czechoslovakia	9.333	9.166	18.499	did not advance		
10	Tamara Zamotaylova	Soviet Union	9.266	9.233	18.499	did not advance		
13	Natalia Kot	Poland	9.266	9.200	18.466	did not advance		
13	Lena Adler	Sweden	9.000	9.446	18.466	did not advance		
15	Elena Leușteanu	Romania	9.333	9.100	18.433	did not advance		
15	Kiyoko Ono	Japan	9.400	9.033	18.433	did not advance		
15	Ewa Rydell	Sweden	9.200	9.233	18.433	did not advance		
18	Keiko Tanaka-Ikeda	Japan	9.166	9.266	18.432	did not advance		
19	Tsvetanka Rangelova	Bulgaria	9.033	9.333	18.366	did not advance		
20	Emilia Vătășoiu	Romania	9.300	9.033	18.333	did not advance		
21	Anikó Ducza	Hungary	9.266	9.000	18.266	did not advance		
22	Judit Füle	Hungary	9.033	9.200	18.233	did not advance		
22	Ginko Abukawa-Chiba	Japan	9.433	8.800	18.233	did not advance		
24	Elena Mărgărit	Romania	9.166	9.066	18.232	did not advance		
25	Solveig Egman-Andersson	Sweden	9.000	9.133	18.133	did not advance		
26	Gail Sontgerath	United States	9.166	8.966	18.132	did not advance		
26	Mirjana Bilić	Yugoslavia	8.966	9.166	18.132	did not advance		
28	Elisaveta Mileva	Bulgaria	9.000	9.100	18.100	did not advance		
29	Danuta Nowak-Stachow	Poland	9.133	8.966	18.099	did not advance		
29	Gerola Lindahl	Sweden	9.166	8.933	18.099	did not advance		
31	Uta Poreceanu	Romania	9.066	9.000	18.066	did not advance		
31	Monica Elfvin	Sweden	9.033	9.033	18.066	did not advance		
33	Matylda Matoušková-Šínová	Czechoslovakia	9.100	8.933	18.033	did not advance		
34	Toshiko Shirasu-Aihara	Japan	9.066	8.966	18.032	did not advance		
34	Klára Förstner	Hungary	9.066	8.966	18.032	did not advance		
36	Eva Bosáková	Czechoslovakia	9.333	8.666	17.999	did not advance		
36	Atanasia Ionescu	Romania	9.033	9.966	17.999	did not advance		
36	Barbara Eustachiewicz	Poland	9.033	8.966	17.999	did not advance		
39	Doris Fuchs	United States	9.066	8.900	17.966	did not advance		
40	Brygida Dziuba	Poland	8.933	9.000	17.933	did not advance		
40	Karin Boldemann	United Team of Germany	9.200	8.733	17.933	did not advance		
42	Renate Schneider	United Team of Germany	8.766	9.166	17.932	did not advance		
43	Ivanka Dolzheva	Bulgaria	9.200	8.700	17.900	did not advance		
44	Hana Růžičková	Czechoslovakia	9.166	8.700	17.866	did not advance		
44	Rosella Cicognani	Italy	8.766	9.100	17.866	did not advance		
44	Gizela Niedurny	Poland	9.166	8.700	17.866	did not advance		
44	Katalin Müller-Száll	Hungary	9.200	8.666	17.866	did not advance		
44	Olga Tass	Hungary	9.133	8.733	17.866	did not advance		
44	Mária Bencsik	Hungary	8.933	8.933	17.866	did not advance		
44	Danièle Sicot-Coulon	France	9.100	8.766	17.866	did not advance		
51	Betty-Jean Maycock	United States	8.633	9.200	17.833	did not advance		
52	Rayna Grigorova	Bulgaria	9.000	8.800	17.800	did not advance		
53	Kimiko Tsukada	Japan	9.100	8.666	17.766	did not advance		
54	Eryka Mondry-Kost	Poland	9.133	8.566	17.699	did not advance		
55	Stanka Pavlova	Bulgaria	8.733	8.833	17.566	did not advance		
55	Teri Montefusco	United States	8.633	8.933	17.566	did not advance		
57	Tereza Kočiš	Yugoslavia	8.766	8.766	17.532	did not advance		
58	Paulette le Raer	France	8.900	8.600	17.500	did not advance		
59	Miranda Cicognani	Italy	8.433	9.033	17.466	did not advance		
59	Wanda Soprani	Italy	8.700	8.766	17.466	did not advance		
61	Gretel Schiener	United Team of Germany	8.866	8.566	17.432	did not advance		
62	Nevenka Pogačnik	Yugoslavia	8.800	8.600	17.400	did not advance		
63	Elena Lagorara	Italy	8.233	9.166	17.399	did not advance		
64	Roselore Sonntag	United Team of Germany	8.933	8.400	17.333	did not advance		
65	Ute Starke	United Team of Germany	7.800	9.466	17.266	did not advance		
65	Saltirka Spasova-Tarpova	Bulgaria	8.200	9.066	17.266	did not advance		
65	Francesca Costa	Italy	8.333	8.933	17.266	did not advance		
65	Henriette Parzer	Austria	8.400	8.866	17.266	did not advance		
69	Muriel Grossfeld	United States	8.400	8.800	17.200	did not advance		
69	Ritva Salonen	Finland	8.500	8.700	17.200	did not advance		
71	Ria Meyburg	Netherlands	8.466	8.666	17.132	did not advance		
72	Monique Rossi	France	8.733	8.300	17.033	did not advance		
73	Jacqueline Dieudonné	France	8.766	8.266	17.032	did not advance		
74	Pirkko Nieminen	Finland	8.133	8.966	17.099	did not advance		
75	Ernestine Russell	Canada	8.300	8.700	17.000	did not advance		
76	Bep Ipenburg	Netherlands	8.333	8.600	16.933	did not advance		
77	Anne-Marie Demortière	France	8.633	8.266	16.899	did not advance		
77	Lineke Majolee	Netherlands	8.266	8.633	16.899	did not advance		
79	Renée Hugon	France	8.666	8.133	16.799	did not advance		
80	Eira Lehtonen	Finland	8.200	8.500	16.700	did not advance		
81	Yu Myeong-ja	South Korea	8.000	8.666	16.666	did not advance		
82	Ulla Lindström	Sweden	7.266	9.366	16.632	did not advance		
83	Antoinette Kuiters	South Africa	8.333	8.233	16.566	did not advance		
83	Liliane Becker	Luxembourg	8.066	8.500	16.566	did not advance		
85	Tuovi Sappinen	Finland	7.666	8.800	16.466	did not advance		
85	Godelieve Brys	Belgium	8.433	8.033	16.466	did not advance		
87	Gabriella Santarelli	Italy	8.066	8.366	16.432	did not advance		
88	Gwynedd Lewis-Lingard	Great Britain	8.366	8.033	16.399	did not advance		
89	Waltraud Benesch	Austria	8.100	8.266	16.366	did not advance		
90	Raili Tuominen-Hämäläinen	Finland	7.966	8.366	16.332	did not advance		
91	Dália da Cunha-Sammer	Portugal	8.233	7.933	16.166	did not advance		
92	Montserrat Artamendi	Spain	8.066	8.066	16.132	did not advance		
93	Nel Wambach	Netherlands	8.000	8.100	16.100	did not advance		
94	Nel Fritz	Netherlands	8.000	8.066	16.066	did not advance		
94	Anni Cermak	Austria	7.966	8.100	16.066	did not advance		
96	Ralli Ben-Yehuda	Israel	7.566	8.433	15.999	did not advance		
96	Elena Artamendi	Spain	7.933	8.066	15.999	did not advance		
98	Veronica Grymonprez	Belgium	7.766	8.200	15.966	did not advance		
99	Kaarina Autio	Finland	7.600	8.333	15.933	did not advance		
100	Ruth Abeles	Israel	8.133	7.766	15.899	did not advance		
101	Marjorie Carter	Great Britain	7.766	8.100	15.866	did not advance		
101	Esbela da Fonseca	Portugal	8.100	7.766	15.866	did not advance		
103	Pat Perks	Great Britain	8.133	7.700	15.833	did not advance		
104	Rita Van De Velde	Belgium	7.966	7.800	15.766	did not advance		
105	Rosa Balaguer	Spain	7.700	8.033	15.733	did not advance		
106	Yvonne Stoffel-Wagener	Luxembourg	7.966	7.600	15.566	did not advance		
107	Kazuko Sogabe	Japan	8.966	6.666	15.632	did not advance		
108	Miriam Kara	Israel	7.700	7.600	15.300	did not advance		
109	María del Carmen González	Spain	7.933	7.333	15.266	did not advance		
110	Erika Bogovic	Austria	7.400	7.366	14.766	did not advance		
110	Renata Müller	Spain	6.866	7.900	14.766	did not advance		
112	María Luisa Fernández	Spain	7.300	7.400	14.700	did not advance		
113	Dorothy Summers	Great Britain	7.566	7.066	14.632	did not advance		
114	Louise Parker	Canada	6.500	8.033	14.533	did not advance		
115	Jill Pollard	Great Britain	7.700	6.800	14.500	did not advance		
116	Margaret Thomas-Neale	Great Britain	7.833	6.666	14.499	did not advance		
117	Kaye Breadsell	Australia	7.933	6.366	14.299	did not advance		
118	Elfriede Hirnschall	Austria	8.200	6.000	14.200	did not advance		
119	Maria Helena Cunha	Portugal	7.666	6.200	13.866	did not advance		
120	Val Roberts	Australia	8.000	5.800	13.800	did not advance		
121	Ria van Velsen	Netherlands	8.633	–	8.633	did not advance		
122	Yolanda Williams	Cuba	–	7.866	7.866	did not advance		
123	Hildegard Reitter	Austria	7.000	–	7.000	did not advance		
124	Julia Uria	Cuba	–	5.933	5.933	did not advance		
