= Gymnastics at the 1960 Summer Olympics – Women's artistic team all-around =

Women's artistic team all-around at the Games of the XVII Olympiad
- Venue: Baths of Caracalla
- Date: 6–8 September 1960
- Competitors: 102 from 17 nations
- Winning score: 382.320

Medalists
1st place, gold medalist(s)		Polina Astakhova; Lidia Ivanova; Larisa Latynina; Tamara Lyukhina; Sofia Muratova; Margarita Nikolaeva	Soviet Union
2nd place, silver medalist(s)		Eva Bosáková; Věra Čáslavská; Matylda Matoušková-Šínová; Hana Růžičková; Ludmila Švédová; Adolfína Tkačíková-Tačová	Czechoslovakia
3rd place, bronze medalist(s)		Atanasia Ionescu; Sonia Iovan; Elena Leuşteanu; Emilia Vătăşoiu-Liţă; Elena Mărgărit; Uta Poreceanu	Romania

The women's artistic team all-around competition, one of six events for female competitors in artistic gymnastics at the 1960 Summer Olympics in Rome, was held at the Baths of Caracalla from 6 to 8 September. It was the 6th appearance of the event.

== Competition format ==
The gymnastics all-around events continued to use the aggregation format, though the team portable apparatus component was eliminated. Each nation entered a team of six gymnasts. All entrants in the gymnastics competitions performed both a compulsory exercise and a voluntary exercise for each apparatus. The top five individual scores in each exercise (that is, compulsory floor, voluntary floor, compulsory vault, etc.) were added to give a team score for that exercise. The 8 team exercise scores were summed to give a team total.

No separate finals were contested for the all-around events, though separate apparatus finals were added.

Exercise scores ranged from 0 to 10, apparatus scores from 0 to 20, individual totals from 0 to 80, and team scores from 0 to 400.

== Results ==
Rank	Nation	Gymnasts	Exercise results								Team total
Rank	Nation	Gymnasts	Floor (gymnastics)		Balance beam		Parallel bars		Vault (gymnastics)		Team total
Rank	Nation	Gymnasts	C	V	C	V	C	V	C	V	Team total
1st place, gold medalist(s)	Soviet Union	Polina Astakhova	9.666	9.866	9.500	8.733	9.800	9.833	9.466	9.300	382.320
1st place, gold medalist(s)	Soviet Union	Lidiya Ivanova	9.433	9.700	~~9.233~~	9.466	9.533	9.500	9.300	9.266	382.320
1st place, gold medalist(s)	Soviet Union	Larisa Latynina	9.666	9.900	9.366	9.700	9.700	9.733	9.533	9.433	382.320
1st place, gold medalist(s)	Soviet Union	Sofia Muratova	9.500	9.733	9.466	9.666	9.633	9.666	9.566	9.466	382.320
1st place, gold medalist(s)	Soviet Union	Margarita Nikolaeva	~~9.433~~	~~9.533~~	9.400	9.566	~~9.333~~	~~9.466~~	9.500	9.600	382.320
1st place, gold medalist(s)	Soviet Union	Tamara Zamotaylova	9.566	9.800	9.533	–	9.566	9.700	~~9.266~~	~~9.233~~	382.320
1st place, gold medalist(s)	Soviet Union	Total	47.831	48.999	17.265	47.131	48.432	96664	47.365	47.065	382.320
2nd place, silver medalist(s)	Czechoslovakia	Eva Bosáková	9.500	9.666	9.400	9.766	9.400	9.466	9.333	~~8.666~~	373.323
2nd place, silver medalist(s)	Czechoslovakia	Věra Čáslavská	9.500	9.600	9.233	9.533	9.233	9.500	9.433	9.266	373.323
2nd place, silver medalist(s)	Czechoslovakia	Matylda Matoušková-Šínová	~~9.133~~	~~9.233~~	~~9.000~~	9.200	9.266	9.400	~~9.100~~	8.933	373.323
2nd place, silver medalist(s)	Czechoslovakia	Hana Růžičková	9.300	9.300	9.100	~~9.200~~	~~8.966~~	~~9.000~~	9.166	8.700	373.323
2nd place, silver medalist(s)	Czechoslovakia	Ludmila Švédová	9.400	9.400	9.200	9.433	9.400	9.233	9.333	9.166	373.323
2nd place, silver medalist(s)	Czechoslovakia	Adolfína Tkačíková-Tačová	9.400	9.500	9.166	9.266	9.166	9.300	9.466	9.300	373.323
2nd place, silver medalist(s)	Czechoslovakia	Total	47.100	47.466	46.099	47.198	46.899	93364	46.731	45.365	373.323
3rd place, bronze medalist(s)	Romania	Atanasia Ionescu	9.266	9.500	9.133	9.200	9.166	9.300	~~9.033~~	9.966	372.053
3rd place, bronze medalist(s)	Romania	Sonia Iovan	9.466	9.733	9.200	9.400	9.600	9.666	9.466	9.266	372.053
3rd place, bronze medalist(s)	Romania	Elena Leușteanu	9.400	9.700	9.066	9.300	9.400	9.566	9.333	9.100	372.053
3rd place, bronze medalist(s)	Romania	Elena Mărgărit	~~9.066~~	9.366	~~6.800~~	~~9.066~~	~~9.033~~	~~9.000~~	9.166	9.066	372.053
3rd place, bronze medalist(s)	Romania	Uta Poreceanu	9.200	~~9.233~~	8.933	9.233	9.166	9.366	9.066	~~9.000~~	372.053
3rd place, bronze medalist(s)	Romania	Emilia Vătășoiu	9.400	9.566	9.000	9.233	9.366	9.366	9.300	9.033	372.053
3rd place, bronze medalist(s)	Romania	Total	46.732	47.865	45.332	46.366	47.264	93962	46.331	45.465	372.053
4	Japan	Ginko Abukawa-Chiba	9.200	9.266	9.000	~~8.166~~	~~9.233~~	~~9.233~~	9.433	8.800	371.422
4	Japan	Kiyoko Ono	9.333	9.300	9.066	9.300	9.400	9.566	9.400	9.033	371.422
4	Japan	Toshiko Shirasu-Aihara	~~9.000~~	~~9.200~~	9.266	9.200	9.300	9.300	9.066	8.966	371.422
4	Japan	Kazuko Sogabe	9.400	9.300	8.900	9.533	9.333	9.500	~~8.966~~	~~6.666~~	371.422
4	Japan	Keiko Tanaka-Ikeda	9.533	9.533	9.266	9.666	9.533	9.733	9.166	9.266	371.422
4	Japan	Kimiko Tsukada	9.300	9.233	~~8.833~~	9.366	9.300	9.600	9.100	8.666	371.422
4	Japan	Total	46.766	46.632	45.498	47.065	47.699	94565	46.165	44.731	371.422
5	Poland	Brygida Dziuba	9.400	9.400	9.066	8.200	~~8.866~~	~~9.033~~	~~8.933~~	9.000	368.620
5	Poland	Barbara Eustachiewicz	~~9.200~~	9.400	9.000	9.233	9.233	9.233	9.033	8.966	368.620
5	Poland	Natalia Kot	9.466	9.600	~~8.900~~	9.433	9.466	9.533	9.266	9.200	368.620
5	Poland	Eryka Mondry-Kost	9.266	~~9.300~~	9.000	9.300	8.966	9.233	9.133	~~8.566~~	368.620
5	Poland	Gizela Niedurny	9.466	9.366	9.000	~~7.983~~	9.366	9.600	9.166	8.700	368.620
5	Poland	Danuta Nowak-Stachow	9.466	9.600	8.966	9.266	9.100	9.433	9.133	8.966	368.620
5	Poland	Total	47.064	47.366	45.032	45.432	47.032	93163	45.731	44.832	368.620
6	United Team of Germany	Karin Boldemann	~~9.066~~	9.200	~~9.000~~	~~7.933~~	9.300	~~8.866~~	9.200	8.733	367.754
6	United Team of Germany	Ingrid Föst	9.500	9.600	9.300	9.400	9.433	9.533	9.133	9.366	367.754
6	United Team of Germany	Gretel Schiener	9.266	9.233	9.100	9.233	9.300	9.133	8.866	8.566	367.754
6	United Team of Germany	Renate Schneider	9.133	~~9.066~~	9.133	8.266	9.166	9.333	8.766	9.166	367.754
6	United Team of Germany	Roselore Sonntag	9.300	9.366	9.133	9.200	~~9.166~~	9.466	8.933	~~8.400~~	367.754
6	United Team of Germany	Ute Starke	9.133	9.500	9.066	9.400	9.400	9.033	~~7.800~~	9.466	367.754
6	United Team of Germany	Total	46.332	46.899	45.732	45.499	46.498	93097	44.898	45.297	367.754
7	Hungary	Mária Bencsik	9.133	9.300	9.066	8.766	8.966	~~8.933~~	~~8.933~~	8.933	367.054
7	Hungary	Anikó Ducza	9.333	9.800	~~8.166~~	9.233	9.200	9.400	9.266	9.000	367.054
7	Hungary	Klára Förstner	~~8.966~~	9.433	9.000	9.000	9.000	9.266	9.066	8.966	367.054
7	Hungary	Judit Füle	9.166	9.566	9.000	9.200	9.466	9.000	9.033	9.200	367.054
7	Hungary	Katalin Müller-Száll	9.066	~~9.233~~	9.300	9.066	8.966	9.033	9.200	~~8.666~~	367.054
7	Hungary	Olga Tass	9.233	9.666	9.033	~~7.966~~	9.333	9.300	9.133	8.733	367.054
7	Hungary	Total	45.931	47.765	45.599	45.265	45.999	91964	45.698	44.832	367.054
8	Bulgaria	Ivanka Dolzheva	9.000	9.266	~~8.633~~	9.033	9.300	9.200	9.200	~~8.700~~	364.920
8	Bulgaria	Rayna Grigorova	9.200	9.366	9.200	9.466	9.466	9.400	9.000	8.800	364.920
8	Bulgaria	Elisaveta Mileva	~~8.966~~	~~9.066~~	8.966	8.966	9.000	~~8.900~~	9.000	9.100	364.920
8	Bulgaria	Stanka Pavlova	9.933	9.366	8.933	9.133	~~8.633~~	9.133	8.733	8.833	364.920
8	Bulgaria	Tsvetanka Rangelova	9.166	9.266	9.066	~~7.966~~	8.800	9.366	9.033	9.333	364.920
8	Bulgaria	Saltirka Spasova-Tarpova	9.033	9.233	8.900	8.966	9.366	9.300	~~8.200~~	9.066	364.920
8	Bulgaria	Total	45.365	46.497	45.065	45.564	46.399	92331	44.966	45.132	364.920
9	United States	Doris Fuchs	8.866	~~9.200~~	9.066	8.400	9.400	9.600	9.066	8.900	363.053
9	United States	Muriel Grossfeld	9.466	9.400	8.900	~~8.200~~	9.233	~~7.733~~	~~8.400~~	~~8.800~~	363.053
9	United States	Betty-Jean Maycock	~~8.833~~	9.366	8.600	9.166	9.066	9.066	8.633	9.200	363.053
9	United States	Teri Montefusco	8.866	9.400	8.533	9.166	~~8.566~~	9.266	8.633	8.933	363.053
9	United States	Sharon Richardson	9.033	9.300	~~8.366~~	9.233	8.600	9.066	9.200	9.333	363.053
9	United States	Gail Sontgerath	9.333	9.333	9.000	9.333	9.066	8.900	9.166	8.966	363.053
9	United States	Total	45.564	46.799	44.099	45.298	45.898	91263	44.698	45.332	363.053
10	Italy	Miranda Cicognani	9.300	9.466	9.000	9.366	9.433	9.566	8.433	9.033	360.719
10	Italy	Rosella Cicognani	9.133	9.500	9.066	8.233	9.366	9.533	8.766	9.100	360.719
10	Italy	Francesca Costa	9.033	~~9.166~~	8.700	8.600	~~8.900~~	~~8.133~~	8.333	8.933	360.719
10	Italy	Elena Lagorara	9.133	9.400	~~8.700~~	~~7.900~~	9.366	9.366	8.233	9.166	360.719
10	Italy	Gabriella Santarelli	9.100	9.300	8.966	8.066	9.300	8.766	~~8.066~~	~~8.366~~	360.719
10	Italy	Wanda Soprani	~~9.000~~	9.233	9.066	8.933	9.100	8.866	8.700	8.766	360.719
10	Italy	Total	45.699	46.899	44.798	43.198	46.097	92662	42.465	44.998	360.719
11	Sweden	Lena Adler	8.866	9.200	~~8.666~~	8.900	8.766	8.333	9.000	9.446	359.470
11	Sweden	Solveig Egman-Andersson	8.766	9.133	8.900	~~8.700~~	~~8.433~~	8.666	9.000	9.133	359.470
11	Sweden	Monica Elfvin	~~8.700~~	~~9.000~~	8.866	9.000	9.000	~~8.133~~	9.033	9.033	359.470
11	Sweden	Gerola Lindahl	8.733	9.266	8.933	8.850	9.000	8.366	9.166	~~8.933~~	359.470
11	Sweden	Ulla Lindström	9.266	9.266	9.033	9.200	8.800	8.200	~~7.266~~	9.366	359.470
11	Sweden	Ewa Rydell	9.066	9.400	8.966	9.033	9.066	9.000	9.200	9.233	359.470
11	Sweden	Total	44.697	46.265	44.698	44.983	42.565	87197	45.399	46.231	359.470
12	France	Anne-Marie Demortière	8.933	9.333	9.166	8.900	8.933	8.600	~~8.633~~	8.266	354.189
12	France	Jacqueline Dieudonné	9.266	9.500	9.133	8.833	9.000	8.800	8.766	8.266	354.189
12	France	Renée Hugon	~~8.800~~	~~8.933~~	~~7.833~~	~~7.633~~	~~8.700~~	8.700	8.666	~~8.133~~	354.189
12	France	Paulette le Raer	8.900	9.066	8.600	8.600	8.800	8.766	8.900	8.600	354.189
12	France	Monique Rossi	8.933	9.200	8.700	8.466	8.800	~~8.366~~	8.733	8.300	354.189
12	France	Danièle Sicot-Coulon	9.133	9.433	9.000	8.033	9.033	9.266	9.100	8.766	354.189
12	France	Total	45.165	45.532	44.599	42.832	44.132	88698	44.165	42.198	354.189
13	Finland	Kaarina Autio	~~8.500~~	8.966	~~7.400~~	8.800	8.400	8.500	~~7.600~~	~~8.333~~	345.420
13	Finland	Eira Lehtonen	8.533	~~8.700~~	8.033	9.066	8.666	~~8.166~~	8.200	8.500	345.420
13	Finland	Pirkko Nieminen	9.166	9.033	8.266	9.000	9.233	9.333	8.133	8.966	345.420
13	Finland	Ritva Salonen	8.933	9.033	7.566	8.800	8.400	8.766	8.500	8.700	345.420
13	Finland	Tuovi Sappinen	8.833	9.166	7.800	8.900	8.833	9.166	7.666	8.800	345.420
13	Finland	Raili Tuominen-Hämäläinen	8.633	8.833	8.000	~~7.866~~	~~8.000~~	8.966	7.966	8.366	345.420
13	Finland	Total	44.098	45.031	30.665	44.566	44.731	88263	40.465	43.332	345.420
14	Netherlands	Nel Fritz	8.166	8.766	8.033	9.000	8.366	9.000	8.000	8.066	341.688
14	Netherlands	Bep Ipenburg	8.200	8.833	8.133	8.766	8.933	9.300	8.333	8.600	341.688
14	Netherlands	Ria van Velsen	8.066	–	~~7.666~~	–	9.033	~~8.000~~	8.633	–	341.688
14	Netherlands	Ria Meyburg	8.066	8.700	8.100	8.933	~~5.966~~	8.900	8.466	8.666	341.688
14	Netherlands	Nel Wambach	~~7.966~~	8.800	7.900	8.900	8.466	9.033	~~8.000~~	8.100	341.688
14	Netherlands	Lineke Majolee	8.000	8.766	8.000	8.866	8.700	9.100	8.266	8.633	341.688
14	Netherlands	Total	40.498	43.865	40.266	44.465	45.333	88831	41.698	42.065	341.688
15	Austria	Waltraud Benesch	8.200	8.566	8.200	8.666	8.500	9.000	8.100	8.266	326.038
15	Austria	Erika Bogovic	~~7.466~~	7.933	~~7.600~~	8.433	7.866	8.600	7.400	7.366	326.038
15	Austria	Anni Cermak	7.500	8.033	7.933	6.583	~~7.800~~	8.566	7.966	8.100	326.038
15	Austria	Elfriede Hirnschall	8.933	8.800	8.666	8.800	8.366	8.166	8.200	6.000	326.038
15	Austria	Henriette Parzer	8.466	8.433	8.333	7.066	8.166	8.800	8.400	8.866	326.038
15	Austria	Hildegard Reitter	7.900	–	7.800	–	8.100	–	~~7.000~~	–	326.038
15	Austria	Total	40.999	41.765	40.932	39.548	43.132	84130	40.066	38.598	326.038
16	Spain	Elena Artamendi	8.300	–	7.600	7.766	8.100	7.766	7.933	8.066	302.387
16	Spain	Montserrat Artamendi	6.266	8.200	7.400	7.266	~~5.700~~	6.833	8.066	8.066	302.387
16	Spain	Rosa Balaguer	7.633	7.966	7.400	7.866	6.200	7.666	7.700	8.033	302.387
16	Spain	María del Carmen González	6.433	7.833	7.333	~~6.200~~	7.033	7.333	7.933	~~7.333~~	302.387
16	Spain	María Luisa Fernández	~~6.266~~	7.933	7.766	6.333	6.433	~~6.200~~	7.300	7.400	302.387
16	Spain	Renata Müller	8.200	7.966	~~6.433~~	7.533	7.833	7.800	~~6.866~~	7.900	302.387
16	Spain	Total	36.832	39.898	37.499	36.764	37.398	72997	38.932	39.465	302.387
17	Great Britain	Gwynedd Lewis-Lingard	7.933	8.333	7.366	7.833	6.500	6.666	8.366	8.033	297.721
17	Great Britain	Pat Perks	6.766	8.133	7.433	7.400	7.166	7.200	8.133	7.700	297.721
17	Great Britain	Jill Pollard	~~6.466~~	7.766	7.366	7.500	~~5.466~~	5.566	7.700	6.800	297.721
17	Great Britain	Marjorie Carter	7.500	~~7.166~~	~~7.166~~	7.266	6.833	6.666	7.766	8.100	297.721
17	Great Britain	Dorothy Summers	7.700	8.800	7.500	~~7.100~~	6.133	~~2.500~~	~~7.566~~	7.066	297.721
17	Great Britain	Margaret Thomas-Neale	7.633	7.900	7.433	7.633	6.900	7.400	7.833	~~6.666~~	297.721
17	Great Britain	Total	37.532	40.932	37.098	37.632	33.498	67030	39.798	37.699	297.721
