= List of Olympic female artistic gymnasts for South Africa =

Gymnastics events have been staged at the Olympic Games since 1896. South African female artistic gymnasts have participated in three editions of the Summer Olympics, in 1960, 2004, and 2020. South African women have yet to win a medal at the Olympics.

== Gymnasts ==
Gymnast	Years	Ref.
Antoinette Kuiters	1960	
Zandré Labuschagne	2004	
Caitlin Rooskrantz	2020, 2024	
Naveen Daries	2020	
