= Godelieve Brys =

Belgian gymnast (born 1937)

Personal information
- Nationality: Belgian
- Born: 24 April 1937 (age 87); Aalst, Belgium

Sport
- Sport: Gymnastics

Godelieve Brys (born 24 April 1937) is a Belgian gymnast. She competed in five events at the 1960 Summer Olympics.
