= Rita Van De Velde =

Belgian gymnast (born 1941)

Personal information
- Nationality: Belgian
- Born: 23 September 1941 (age 83); Schellebelle, Belgium

Sport
- Sport: Gymnastics

Rita Van De Velde (born 23 September 1941) is a Belgian gymnast. She competed in five events at the 1960 Summer Olympics.
