= Yu Myeong-ja =

South Korean gymnast

Personal information
- Nationality: South Korean
- Born: 2 April 1943 (age 82); Chungcheongnam, South Korea

Sport
- Sport: Gymnastics

- Yu Myeong-ja
- Hangul: 유명자
- Hanja: 柳明子
- RR: Yu Myeongja
- MR: Yu Myŏngja

Yu Myeong-ja (born 2 April 1943) is a South Korean gymnast. She competed in five events at the 1960 Summer Olympics.
