= Julia Uria =

Cuban gymnast (born 1944)

Personal information
- Born: 31 January 1944 (age 81); Holguín, Cuba

Sport
- Sport: Gymnastics

Julia Uria (born 31 January 1944) is a Cuban gymnast. She competed in five events at the 1960 Summer Olympics.
