= Yvonne Stoffel-Wagener =

Luxembourgish gymnast (1931–2014)

Personal information
- Nationality: Luxembourgish
- Born: 16 May 1931; Esch-sur-Alzette, Luxembourg
- Died: 5 April 2014 (aged 82); Esch-sur-Alzette, Luxembourg

Sport
- Sport: Gymnastics

Yvonne Stoffel-Wagener (16 May 1931 – 5 April 2014) was a Luxembourgish gymnast. She competed in five events at the 1960 Summer Olympics.
