= Yolanda Williams =

Cuban gymnast (born 1943)

Personal information
- Born: 15 July 1943 (age 81); Havana, Cuba

Sport
- Sport: Gymnastics

Yolanda Williams (born 15 July 1943) is a Cuban gymnast. She competed in five events at the 1960 Summer Olympics.
