= Maria Helena Cunha =

Portuguese gymnast (born 1943)

Personal information
- Nationality: Portuguese
- Born: 19 December 1943 (age 81); Paredes, Portugal

Sport
- Sport: Gymnastics

Maria Helena Pachedo da Cunha (born 19 December 1943) is a Portuguese gymnast. She competed in five events at the 1960 Summer Olympics.
