= Liliane Becker =

Luxembourgish gymnast (1942–1981)

Personal information
- Nationality: Luxembourgish
- Born: 9 November 1942; Luxembourg City, Luxembourg
- Died: 14 September 1981 (aged 38); Nancy, France

Sport
- Sport: Gymnastics

Liliane Becker (9 November 1942 – 14 September 1981) was a Luxembourgish gymnast. She competed in five events at the 1960 Summer Olympics.
