= Nevenka Pogačnik =

Slovenian gymnast (born 1936)

Personal information
- Nationality: Slovenian
- Born: 14 April 1936 (age 88); Ljubljana, Yugoslavia

Sport
- Sport: Gymnastics

Nevenka Pogačnik (born 14 April 1936) is a Slovenian gymnast. She competed in five events at the 1960 Summer Olympics.
