= Kaye Breadsell =

Australian gymnast (1942–2024)

Personal information
- Full name: Kaye J. Breadsell
- Nationality: Australian
- Born: 2 January 1942; Perth, Western Australia, Australia
- Died: 23 June 2024 (aged 82)

Sport
- Sport: Gymnastics

Kaye Breadsell (2 January 1942 – 23 June 2024), also known as Kaye Brajkovich, was an Australian gymnast. She competed in five events at the 1960 Summer Olympics in Rome as an 18 year old. Breadsell died on 23 June 2024, at the age of 82.
