= Gabriella Santarelli =

Italian gymnast

Personal information
- Nationality: Italian
- Born: 2 March 1936 (age 89); Forlì, Italy

Sport
- Sport: Gymnastics

Gabriella Santarelli (born 2 March 1936) is an Italian former gymnast. She competed in six events at the 1960 Summer Olympics.
