= María Luisa Fernández (gymnast) =

Spanish gymnast

Personal information
- Nationality: Spanish
- Born: 7 March 1943 (age 82); Oviedo, Spain

Sport
- Sport: Gymnastics

María Luisa Fernández (born 7 March 1943) is a Spanish gymnast. She competed in six events at the 1960 Summer Olympics.
