= Karin Boldemann =

East German artistic gymnast

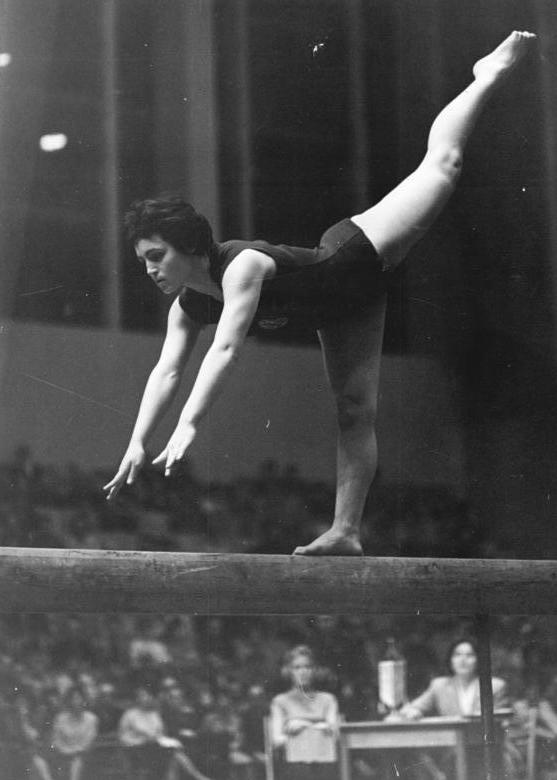
- Karin Boldemann in 1960

Personal information
- Born: 6 October 1940 (age 85) Berlin, Germany
- Height: 1.58 m (5 ft 2 in)
- Weight: 52 kg (115 lb)

Sport
- Sport: Artistic gymnastics
- Club: SC Dynamo Berlin

Karin Boldemann (born 6 October 1940) is a retired German gymnast. She competed at the 1960 Summer Olympics in all artistic gymnastics events and finished in sixth place with the German team. Individually her best achievement was 40th place in the vault.
