= Judit Füle =

Hungarian gymnast

Personal information
- Nationality: Hungarian
- Born: 2 October 1941 (age 83); Cegléd, Hungary

Sport
- Sport: Gymnastics

Judit Füle (born 2 October 1941) is a Hungarian gymnast. She competed in six events at the 1960 Summer Olympics.
