= Lena Adler =

Swedish gymnast (1941–2023)

Personal information
- Nationality: Swedish
- Born: 24 October 1941; Gothenburg, Sweden
- Died: 19 May 2023 (aged 81); Kullavik, Kungsbacka, Sweden
- Height: 1.62 m (5 ft 4 in)
- Weight: 56 kg (123 lb)

Sport
- Sport: Gymnastics

Lena Kristina Adler (24 October 1941 – 19 May 2023) was a Swedish gymnast. She competed in the 1960 Summer Olympics.
