= Elisaveta Mileva =

Bulgarian gymnast (born 1934)

Personal information
- Nationality: Bulgarian
- Born: 10 July 1934 (age 90); Vratsa, Bulgaria

Sport
- Sport: Gymnastics

Elisaveta Mileva (born 10 July 1934) is a Bulgarian gymnast. She competed in six events at the 1960 Summer Olympics.
