= Kaarina Autio =

Finnish gymnast

Personal information
- Nationality: Finnish
- Born: 28 July 1941; Huittinen, Finland
- Died: 4 February 2013 (aged 71); Turku, Finland

Sport
- Sport: Gymnastics

Kaarina Autio (28 July 1941 – 4 February 2013) was a Finnish gymnast. She competed in six events at the 1960 Summer Olympics.
