= Tsvetanka Rangelova =

Bulgarian gymnast (born 1938)

Personal information
- Nationality: Bulgarian
- Born: 31 August 1938 (age 86); Dimitrovgrad, Bulgaria

Sport
- Sport: Gymnastics

Tsvetanka Rangelova (Bulgarian: Цветанка Рангелова) (born 31 August 1938) is a Bulgarian gymnast. She competed in six events at the 1960 Summer Olympics.
