= Eryka Mondry-Kost =

Polish gymnast

Personal information
- Nationality: Polish
- Born: 18 January 1940 (age 85); Ruda Śląska, Poland

Sport
- Sport: Gymnastics

Eryka Mondry-Kost (born 18 January 1940) is a Polish gymnast. She competed in six events at the 1960 Summer Olympics.
