= Kimiko Tsukada =

Japanese artistic gymnast

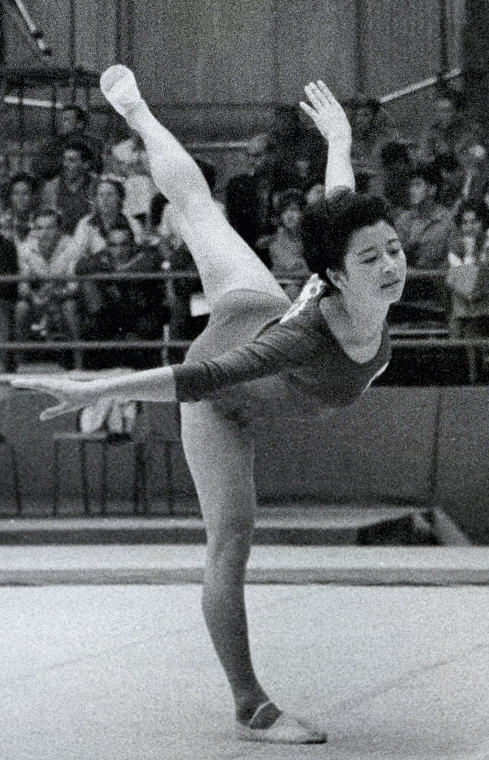
- Tsukada at the 1960 Olympics

Personal information
- Born: October 26, 1937 (age 88) Aichi Prefecture, Japan
- Height: 153 cm (5 ft 0 in)
- Weight: 47 kg (104 lb)

Sport
- Sport: Artistic gymnastics

Kimiko Tsukada (塚田 紀美子, Tsukada Kimiko; born October 26, 1937) is a retired Japanese artistic gymnast. She placed fourth with the Japanese team at the 1960 Summer Olympics, while her best individual result was 15th place on uneven bars.
