= Elfriede Hirnschall =

Austrian gymnast (born 1945)

Personal information
- Nationality: Austrian
- Born: 16 February 1945 (age 80); Vienna, Austria

Sport
- Sport: Gymnastics

Elfriede Hirnschall (born 16 February 1945) is an Austrian gymnast. She competed in six events at the 1960 Summer Olympics.
