= Paulette le Raer =

French gymnast

Personal information
- Nationality: French
- Born: 7 January 1932; Saint-Malo, France
- Died: 28 January 1989 (aged 57)

Sport
- Sport: Gymnastics

Paulette le Raer (7 January 1932 – 28 January 1989) was a French gymnast. She competed in six events at the 1960 Summer Olympics.
