= Tuovi Sappinen =

Finnish gymnast

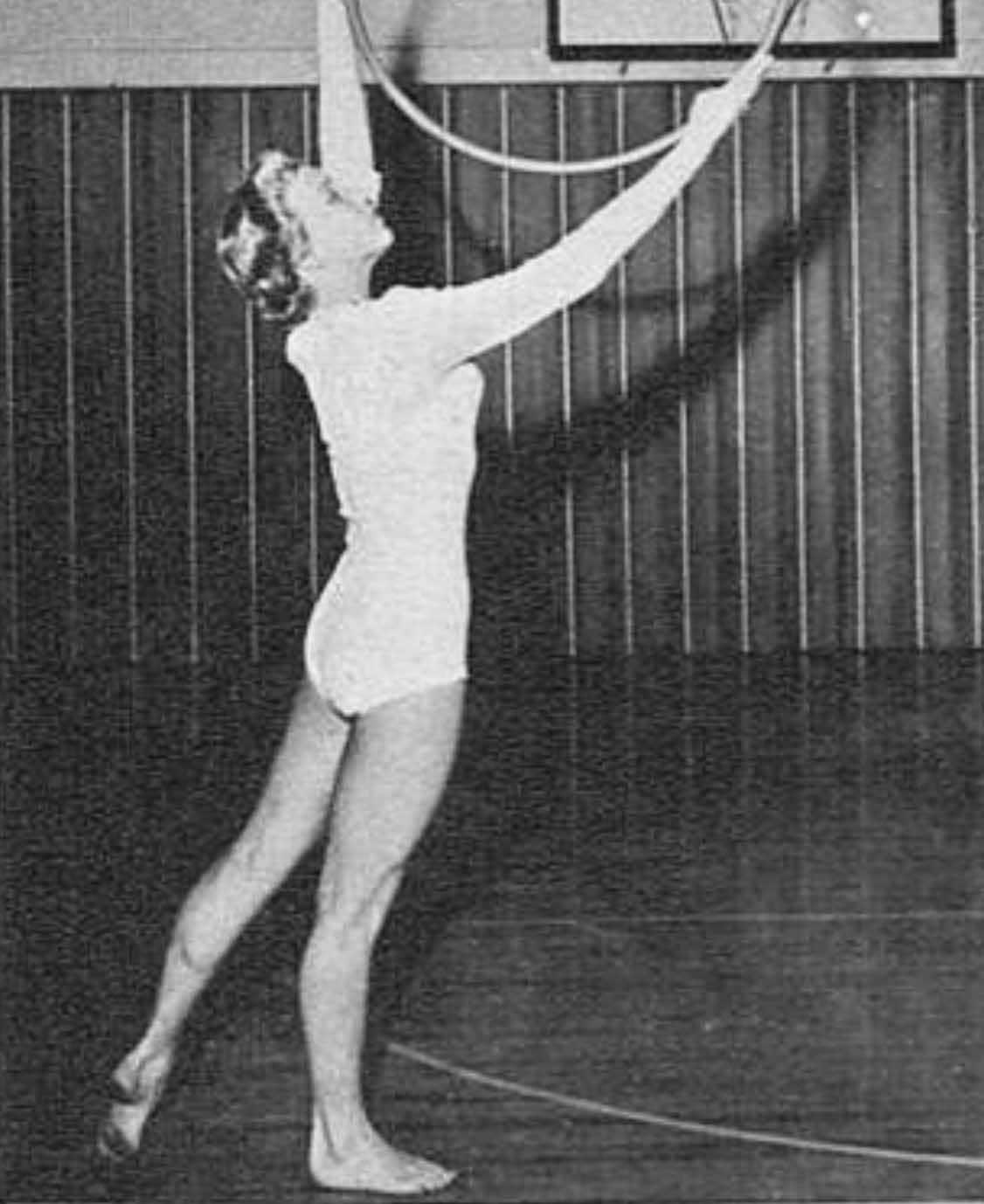

Personal information
- Nationality: Finnish
- Born: 8 April 1941 (age 83); Turku, Finland

Sport
- Sport: Gymnastics

Tuovi Sappinen (born 8 April 1941) is a Finnish gymnast. She competed in six events at the 1960 Summer Olympics.
