= Nel Fritz =

Dutch artistic gymnast

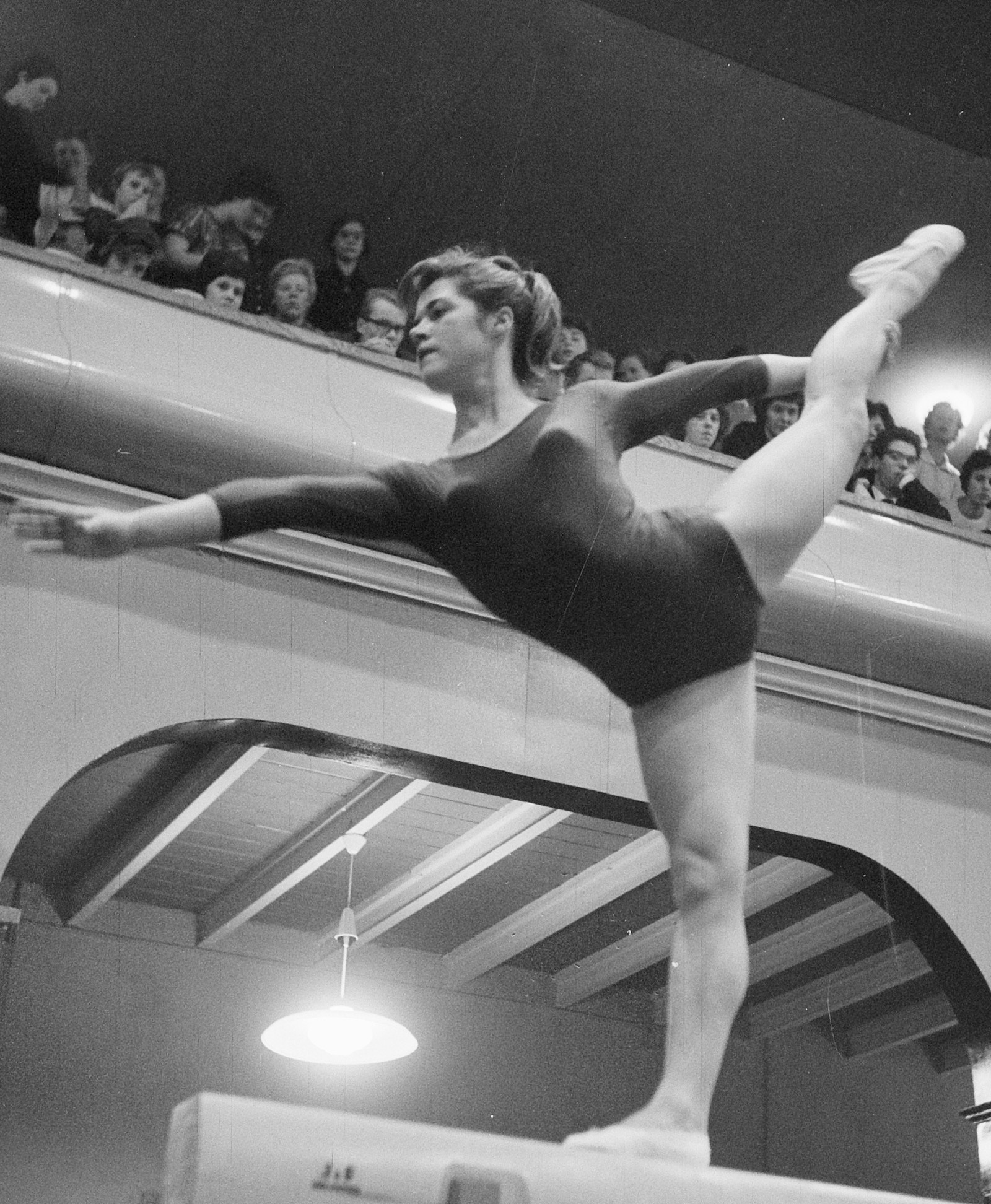
- Nel Fritz in 1961

Personal information
- Born: 4 June 1937 (age 89) Vlissingen, the Netherlands
- Height: 1.67 m (5 ft 6 in)
- Weight: 59 kg (130 lb)

Sport
- Sport: Artistic gymnastics
- Club: VTV, Vlissingen

Pieternella "Nel" Fritz (later Zandee; born 4 June 1937) is a retired Dutch gymnast. She competed at the 1960 Summer Olympics in all artistic gymnastics events and finished in 14th place with the Dutch team. Her best individual result was 68th place on the balance beam.
