= Wanda Soprani =

Italian artistic gymnast (born 1940)

Wanda Soprani (born 9 March 1940) is an Italian former artistic gymnast. She competed at the 1960 Summer Olympics.
