= María del Carmen González =

Spanish gymnast

Personal information
- Nationality: Spanish
- Born: 6 April 1941 (age 83); Madrid, Spain

Sport
- Sport: Gymnastics

María del Carmen González (born 6 April 1941) is a Spanish gymnast. She competed in six events at the 1960 Summer Olympics.
