= Hildegard Reitter =

Austrian gymnast (born 1936)

Personal information
- Nationality: Austrian
- Born: 1936 (age 88–89)

Sport
- Sport: Gymnastics

Hildegard Reitter (born 1936) is an Austrian gymnast. She competed in six events at the 1960 Summer Olympics.
