= Rosa Balaguer =

Spanish gymnast

Personal information
- Nationality: Spanish
- Born: 12 November 1941 (age 83); Barcelona, Spain

Sport
- Sport: Gymnastics

Rosa Balaguer (born 12 November 1941) is a Spanish gymnast. She competed in six events at the 1960 Summer Olympics.
