= Renata Müller =

Spanish gymnast (1937–2021)

Personal information
- Nationality: Spanish
- Born: 11 February 1937; Barcelona, Spain
- Died: 29 July 2021 (aged 84)

Sport
- Sport: Gymnastics

Renata Müller Von-Rathlef (11 February 1937 – 29 July 2021) was a Spanish gymnast. She competed in six events at the 1960 Summer Olympics. Müller died on 29 July 2021, at the age of 84.
