= Nel Wambach =

Dutch artistic gymnast

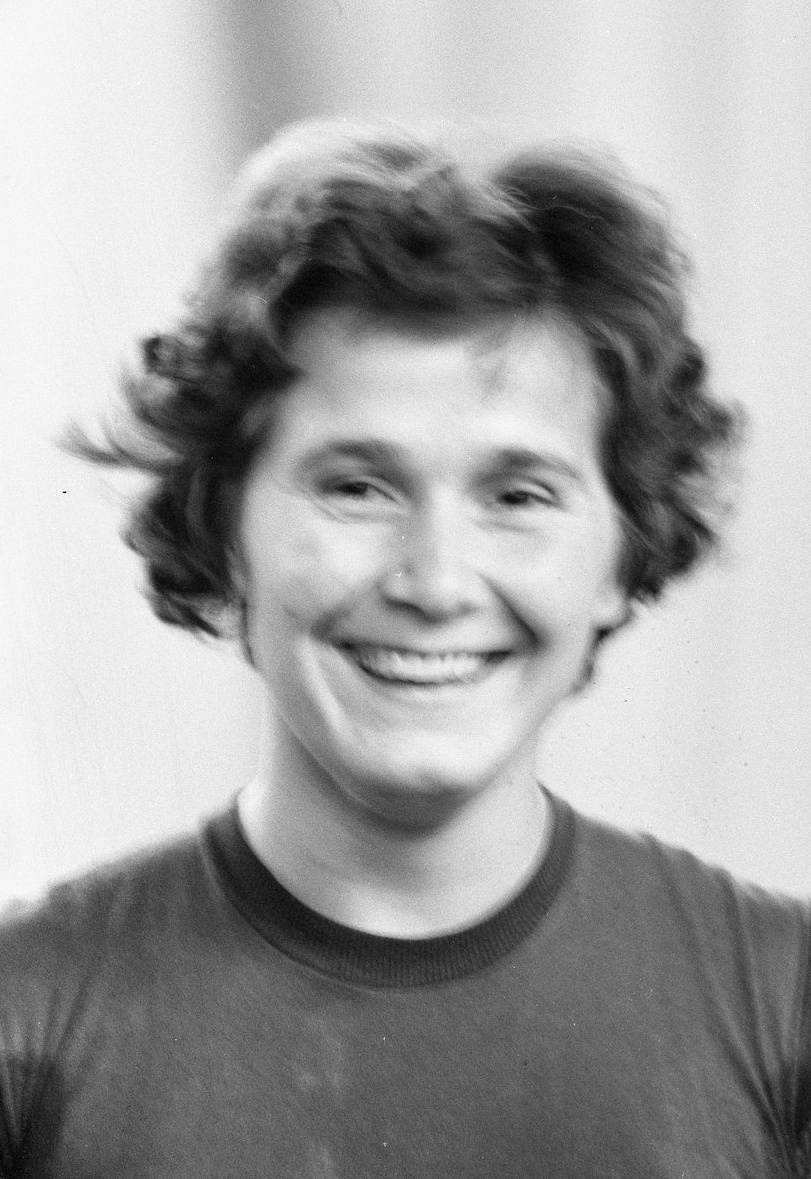
- Nel Wambach in 1960

Personal information
- Born: 9 May 1938 (age 88) Rotterdam, Netherlands
- Height: 1.58 m (5 ft 2 in)
- Weight: 56 kg (123 lb)

Sport
- Sport: Artistic gymnastics
- Club: DOS, Amsterdam

Neeltje "Nel" Wambach (born 9 May 1938) is a former artistic gymnast from the Netherlands. She competed at the 1960 Summer Olympics in all artistic gymnastics events with the best achievement of 14th place in the team allaround.

She won a bronze allround medal at the national championships in 1959.
