= Lineke Majolee =

Dutch gymnast

Personal information
- Nationality: Dutch
- Born: 30 September 1938 (age 86); Heiloo, Netherlands

Sport
- Sport: Gymnastics

Lineke Majolee (born 30 September 1938) is a Dutch gymnast. She competed in six events at the 1960 Summer Olympics.
