= Renate Schneider =

German artistic gymnast

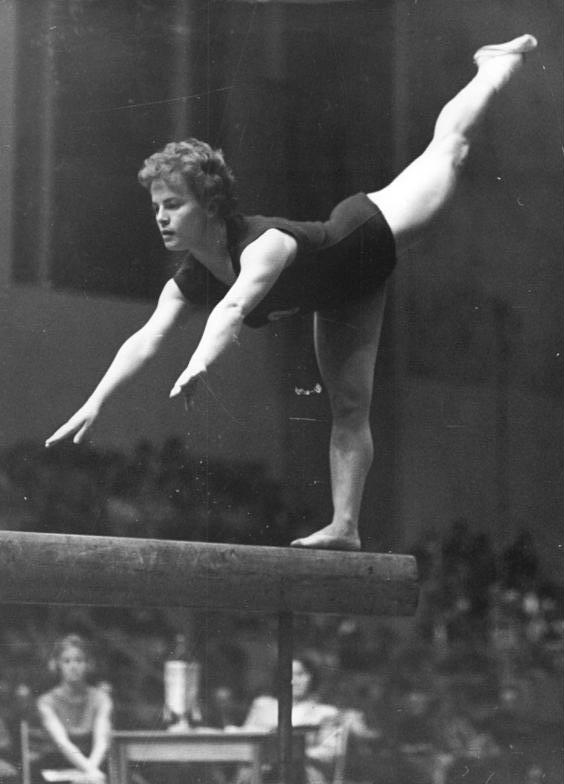
- Renate Schneider in 1960

Personal information
- Born: 3 March 1939 (age 87) Berlin, Germany
- Height: 1.59 m (5 ft 3 in)
- Weight: 50 kg (110 lb)

Sport
- Sport: Artistic gymnastics
- Club: ASK Vorwärts Berlin, SC Dynamo Berlin

Renate Schneider (born 3 May 1939) is a retired German gymnast. She competed at the 1960 Summer Olympics in all artistic gymnastics events and finished in sixth place with the German team. Individually her best achievement was 36th place on the uneven bars. In 1956 she won a national title on the vault.
