= Stanka Pavlova =

Bulgarian gymnast (born 1938)

Personal information
- Nationality: Bulgarian
- Born: 24 May 1938 (age 86); Sofia, Bulgaria

Sport
- Sport: Gymnastics

Stanka Pavlova (Bulgarian: Станка Павлова) (born 24 May 1938) is a Bulgarian gymnast. She competed in six events at the 1960 Summer Olympics.
