= Elena Artamendi =

Spanish gymnast

- Full name: Elena Artamendi García
- Born: 7 August 1939 (age 87) Barcelona, Spain

Gymnastics career
- Discipline: Women's artistic gymnastics
- Country represented: Spain

Elena Artamendi García (born 7 August 1939) is a Spanish gymnast. She competed in six events at the 1960 Summer Olympics.

== See also ==
- List of Olympic female artistic gymnasts for Spain
