= Pat Perks =

British gymnast (born 1940)

Personal information
- Nationality: British
- Born: 1 May 1940 (age 84); Cardiff, Wales

Sport
- Sport: Gymnastics

Pat Perks (born 1 May 1940) is a British gymnast. She competed in six events at the 1960 Summer Olympics.
