= Anni Cermak =

Austrian gymnast (born 1940)

Personal information
- Nationality: Austrian
- Born: 18 June 1940 (age 84)

Sport
- Sport: Gymnastics

Anni Cermak (born 18 June 1940) is an Austrian gymnast. She competed in six events at the 1960 Summer Olympics.
