= Montserrat Artamendi =

Spanish gymnast

Personal information
- Nationality: Spanish
- Born: 17 September 1941 (age 83); Barcelona, Spain

Sport
- Sport: Gymnastics

Montserrat Artamendi García (born 17 September 1941) is a Spanish gymnast. She competed in six events at the 1960 Summer Olympics.
