= Gretel Schiener =

German artistic gymnast

Personal information
- Born: 9 April 1940 (age 86) Altenburg, Germany
- Height: 1.70 m (5 ft 7 in)
- Weight: 49 kg (108 lb)

Sport
- Sport: Artistic gymnastics
- Club: SC Lok Leipzig

Gretel Schiener (born 9 April 1940) is a retired German gymnast. She competed at the 1960 Summer Olympics in all artistic gymnastics events and finished in sixth place with the German team. Individually her best achievement was 21st place on the balance beam.
