= Antoinette Kuiters =

South African gymnast

Personal information
- Nationality: South African
- Born: 11 September 1939 (age 85); Schiedam, Netherlands

Sport
- Sport: Gymnastics

Antoinette Kuiters (born 11 September 1939) is a South African gymnast. She competed in five events at the 1960 Summer Olympics.
