= Francesca Costa =

Italian gymnast

Personal information
- Nationality: Italian
- Born: 16 February 1936; Lodi, Italy
- Died: 12 August 1961 (aged 25)

Sport
- Sport: Gymnastics

Francesca Costa (16 February 1936 – 12 August 1961) was an Italian gymnast. She competed in six events at the 1960 Summer Olympics.
