= Mária Bencsik =

Hungarian gymnast (born 1939)

Personal information
- Nationality: Hungarian
- Born: 10 November 1939 (age 85); Budapest, Hungary

Sport
- Sport: Gymnastics

Mária Bencsik (born 10 November 1939) is a Hungarian gymnast. She competed in six events at the 1960 Summer Olympics.She was born in Budapest, where she began training in gymnastics during her youth and later represented Hungary in national competitions leading up to the Olympics.
