= Ria Meyburg =

Dutch artistic gymnast

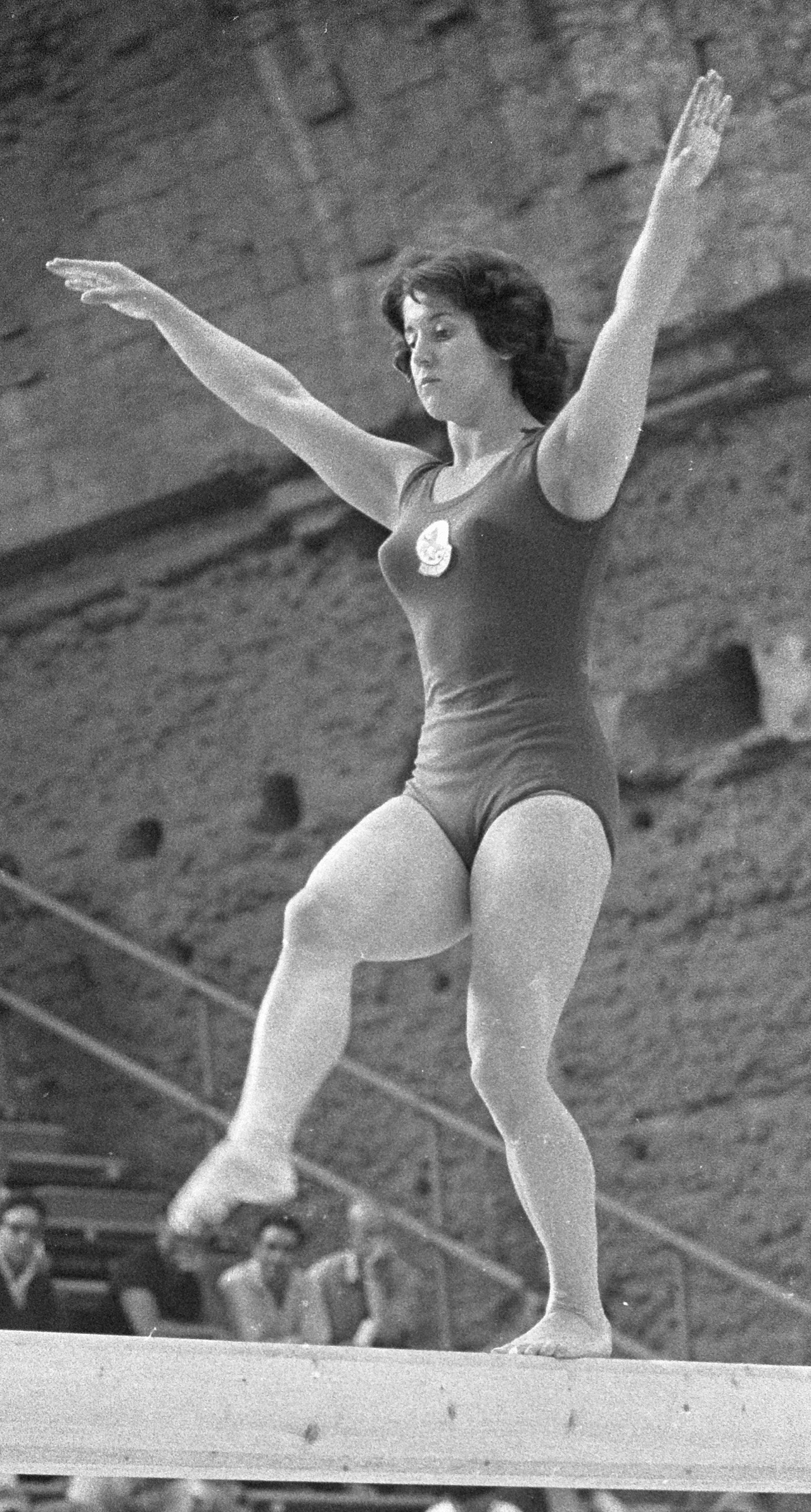
- Ria Meyburg in 1960

Personal information
- Born: 7 January 1939 (age 87) Rotterdam, the Netherlands
- Height: 1.58 m (5 ft 2 in)
- Weight: 52 kg (115 lb)

Sport
- Sport: Artistic gymnastics

Maria Adriana "Ria" Meyburg (born 7 January 1939) is a former artistic gymnast from the Netherlands. She competed at the 1960 Summer Olympics in all artistic gymnastics event with the best achievement of 14th place in the team all-around.
