= Bep Ipenburg =

Dutch artistic gymnast

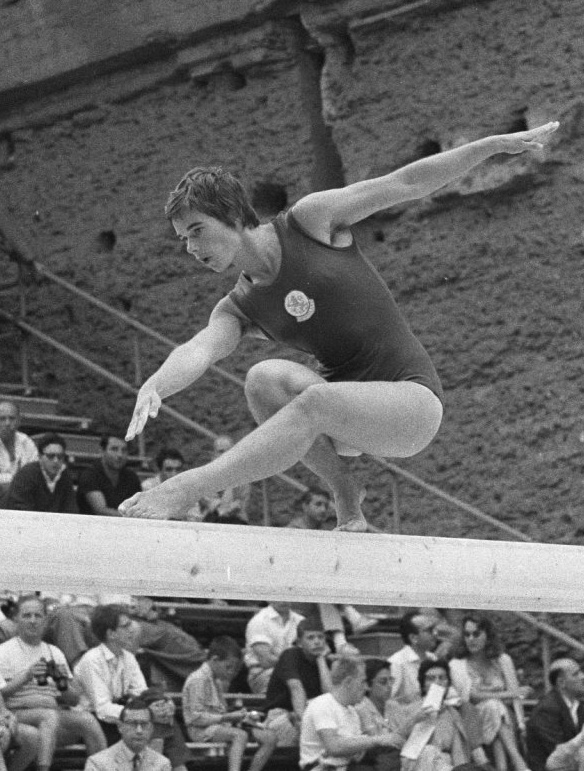
- Ipenburg at the 1960 Olympics

Personal information
- Full name: Lamberta Ipenburg-Drommel
- Born: 21 June 1936 (age 90) Zandvoort, Netherlands
- Height: 1.65 m (5 ft 5 in)
- Weight: 56 kg (123 lb)

Sport
- Sport: Artistic gymnastics
- Club: OSS, Zandvoort

Lamberta "Bep" Ipenburg-Drommel (born 21 June 1936) is a former artistic gymnast from the Netherlands. She competed at the 1960 Summer Olympics in all artistic gymnastics event with the best achievement of 14th place in the team all-around.

She won all-round national titles in 1957–1959 and finished second in 1960 and 1961. She married in 1957–1958 and changed her last name from Drommel to Ipenburg-Drommel.
