= Waltraud Benesch =

Austrian gymnast (born 1941)

Personal information
- Nationality: Austrian
- Born: 5 January 1941 (age 84); Vienna, Austria

Sport
- Sport: Gymnastics

Waltraud Benesch (born 5 January 1941) is an Austrian gymnast. She competed in six events at the 1960 Summer Olympics.
