= Brygida Dziuba =

Polish gymnast

Personal information
- Born: 11 February 1939; Nowy Bytom, Śląskie, Poland

Brygida Dziuba (born 11 February 1939) is a former Polish gymnast. She competed at the 1960 Summer Olympics representing Poland.

== See also ==
- Poland at the 1960 Summer Olympics
