= Pirkko Nieminen =

Finnish gymnast (1939–2022)

Personal information
- Nationality: Finnish
- Born: 23 March 1939 Tampere, Finland
- Died: 8 November 2022 (aged 83)

Sport
- Sport: Gymnastics

Pirkko Nieminen (23 March 1939 – 8 November 2022) was a Finnish gymnast. She competed in six events at the 1960 Summer Olympics.
