= Ritva Salonen =

Finnish gymnast

Personal information
- Nationality: Finnish
- Born: 28 February 1936; Tampere, Finland
- Died: 28 March 1996 (aged 60); Helsinki, Finland

Sport
- Sport: Gymnastics

Ritva Salonen (28 February 1936 – 28 March 1996) was a Finnish gymnast. She competed in six events at the 1960 Summer Olympics.
