= Erika Bogovic =

Austrian gymnast (born 1934)

Personal information
- Nationality: Austrian
- Born: 3 January 1934 (age 91); Vienna, Austria

Sport
- Sport: Gymnastics

Erika Bogovic (born 3 January 1934) is an Austrian gymnast. She competed in six events at the 1960 Summer Olympics.
