= Klára Förstner =

Hungarian gymnast

Personal information
- Nationality: Hungarian
- Born: 29 April 1942 (age 82); Budapest, Hungary

Sport
- Sport: Gymnastics

Klára Förstner (born 29 April 1942) is a Hungarian gymnast. She competed in six events at the 1960 Summer Olympics.
