= European Artistic Gymnastics Championships – Women's balance beam =

The balance beam event at the European Women's Artistic Gymnastics Championships was first held in 1957.

Three medals are awarded: gold for first place, silver for second place, and bronze for third place. Tie breakers have not been used in every year. In the event of a tie between two gymnasts, both names are listed, and the following position (second for a tie for first, third for a tie for second) is left empty because a medal was not awarded for that position. If three gymnastics tied for a position, the following two positions are left empty.

Cătălina Ponor, with five golds and one bronze, holds the records for most gold medals and most total medals in this event.

== Medalists ==
Year	Location	Gold	Silver	Bronze
1957	(Romania) Bucharest	(Soviet Union) Larisa Latynina	(Romania) Sonia Iovan	(Soviet Union) Tamara Manina
1959	(Poland) Kraków	(Czechoslovakia) Věra Čáslavská	(Romania) Sonia Iovan	(Poland) Natalia Kot
1961	(East Germany) Leipzig	(Soviet Union) Polina Astakhova	(Soviet Union) Larisa Latynina	(East Germany) Ingrid Föst
1963	(France) Paris	(Sweden) Ewa Rydell	(Socialist Federal Republic of Yugoslavia) Tereza Kočiš	(Socialist Federal Republic of Yugoslavia) Mirjana Bilić
1965	(Bulgaria) Sofia	(Czechoslovakia) Věra Čáslavská	(Soviet Union) Larisa Latynina	(East Germany) Birgit Radochla (Soviet Union) Larisa Petrik
1967	(Netherlands) Amsterdam	(Czechoslovakia) Věra Čáslavská	(Soviet Union) Natalia Kuchinskaya	(Soviet Union) Zinaida Voronina
1969	(Sweden) Landskrona	(East Germany) Karin Büttner-Janz	(Soviet Union) Olga Karasyova	(Czechoslovakia) Jindra Košťálová
1971	(Soviet Union) Minsk	(Soviet Union) Tamara Lazakovich	(Soviet Union) Ludmilla Tourischeva	(East Germany) Erika Zuchold
1973	(United Kingdom) London	(Soviet Union) Ludmilla Tourischeva	(East Germany) Kerstin Gerschau	(Romania) Anca Grigoraș
1975	(Norway) Skien	(Romania) Nadia Comăneci	(Soviet Union) Nellie Kim	(Romania) Alina Goreac
1977	(Czechoslovakia) Prague	(Soviet Union) Elena Mukhina	(Soviet Union) Nellie Kim	(Soviet Union) Maria Filatova
1979	(Denmark) Copenhagen	(Soviet Union) Natalia Shaposhnikova	(Romania) Emilia Eberle	(Romania) Nadia Comăneci
1981	(Spain) Madrid	(East Germany) Maxi Gnauck	(Soviet Union) Natalia Ilienko	(Romania) Rodica Dunca
1983	(Sweden) Gothenburg	(Romania) Lavinia Agache	(East Germany) Astrid Heese	(Romania) Mihaela Stănuleț
1985	(Finland) Helsinki	(Soviet Union) Oksana Omelianchik	(Czechoslovakia) Hana Říčná	(Soviet Union) Yelena Shushunova
1987	(Soviet Union) Moscow	(Romania) Daniela Silivaș	(Romania) Eugenia Golea	(West Germany) Anja Wilhelm
1989	(Belgium) Brussels	(Soviet Union) Olesya Dudnik (Romania) Gabriela Potorac	None awarded	(Romania) Daniela Silivaș
1990	(Greece) Athens	(Soviet Union) Svetlana Boginskaya	(Soviet Union) Natalia Kalinina	(Romania) Maria Neculiță
1992	(France) Nantes	(Belarus) Svetlana Boginskaya	(Ukraine) Tatiana Gutsu	(Ukraine) Ludmila Stovbchataya
1994	(Sweden) Stockholm	(Romania) Gina Gogean	(Ukraine) Lilia Podkopayeva	(Romania) Lavinia Miloșovici
1996	(United Kingdom) Birmingham	(Russia) Rozalia Galiyeva	(Romania) Gina Gogean	(Belarus) Elena Piskun
1998	(Russia) Saint Petersburg	(Russia) Evgeniya Kuznetsova	(Ukraine) Olha Teslenko	(Russia) Ludmila Ezhova (Romania) Simona Amânar
2000	(France) Paris	(Russia) Svetlana Khorkina	(Romania) Simona Amânar	(Russia) Elena Zamolodchikova
2002	(Greece) Patras	(Russia) Ludmila Ezhova	(Russia) Svetlana Khorkina	(Netherlands) Verona van de Leur
2004	(Netherlands) Amsterdam	(Romania) Cătălina Ponor	(Romania) Alexandra Eremia	(Russia) Svetlana Khorkina
2005	(Hungary) Debrecen	(Romania) Cătălina Ponor	(France) Marine Debauve	(Russia) Anna Pavlova
2006	(Greece) Volos	(Romania) Cătălina Ponor	(Spain) Lenika de Simone	(Ukraine) Maryna Proskurina (Romania) Sandra Izbașa
2007	(Netherlands) Amsterdam	(Russia) Yulia Lozhechko	(Romania) Sandra Izbașa	(Greece) Stefani Bismpikou (Romania) Steliana Nistor
2008	(France) Clermont-Ferrand	(Russia) Ksenia Semyonova	(Romania) Sandra Izbașa (Ukraine) Alina Kozich	None awarded
2009	(Italy) Milan	(Ukraine) Yana Demyanchuk	(Romania) Anamaria Tămârjan	(Romania) Gabriela Drăgoi
2010	(United Kingdom) Birmingham	(Romania) Amelia Racea	(Russia) Aliya Mustafina	(Romania) Raluca Haidu
2011	(Germany) Berlin	(Russia) Anna Dementyeva	(Italy) Carlotta Ferlito	(Italy) Elisabetta Preziosa
2012	(Belgium) Brussels	(Romania) Cătălina Ponor	(Romania) Larisa Iordache	(United Kingdom) Hannah Whelan
2013	(Russia) Moscow	(Romania) Larisa Iordache	(Romania) Diana Bulimar	(Russia) Anastasia Grishina
2014	(Bulgaria) Sofia	(Russia) Maria Kharenkova	(Romania) Larisa Iordache	(Russia) Aliya Mustafina
2015	(France) Montpellier	(Romania) Andreea Munteanu	(United Kingdom) Becky Downie	(France) Claire Martin
2016	(Switzerland) Bern	(Russia) Aliya Mustafina	(France) Marine Boyer	(Romania) Cătălina Ponor
2017	(Romania) Cluj-Napoca	(Romania) Cătălina Ponor	(Netherlands) Eythora Thorsdottir	(Romania) Larisa Iordache
2018	(Scotland) Glasgow	(Netherlands) Sanne Wevers	(Belgium) Nina Derwael	(France) Marine Boyer
2019	(Poland) Szczecin	(United Kingdom) Alice Kinsella	(France) Mélanie de Jesus dos Santos	(France) Lorette Charpy
2020	(Turkey) Mersin	(Romania) Larisa Iordache	(Romania) Silviana Sfiringu	(Ukraine) Anastasiia Motak
2021	(Switzerland) Basel	(France) Mélanie de Jesus dos Santos	(Netherlands) Sanne Wevers	(Ukraine) Anastasia Bachynska
2022	(Germany) Munich	(Germany) Emma Malewski	(United Kingdom) Ondine Achampong	(France) Carolann Héduit
2023	(Turkey) Antalya	(Netherlands) Sanne Wevers	(Italy) Manila Esposito	(Hungary) Zsófia Kovács
2024	(Italy) Rimini	(Italy) Manila Esposito	(Romania) Sabrina Voinea	(France) Marine Boyer
2025	(Germany) Leipzig	(Belgium) Nina Derwael	(Romania) Ana Bărbosu	(Italy) Sofia Tonelli
2026	(Croatia) Zagreb	(France) Elena Colas	(Italy) Manila Esposito	(Russia) Angelina Melnikova

== Medal table ==
Rank	Nation	Gold	Silver	Bronze	Total
1	Romania (ROU)	14	16	15	45
2	Soviet Union (URS)	9	9	5	23
3	Russia (RUS)	9	2	7	18
4	Czechoslovakia (TCH)	3	1	1	5
5	France (FRA)	2	3	5	10
6	East Germany (GDR)	2	2	3	7
7	Netherlands (NED)	2	2	1	5
8	Ukraine (UKR)	1	4	4	9
9	Italy (ITA)	1	3	2	6
10	Great Britain (GBR)	1	2	1	4
11	Belgium (BEL)	1	1	0	2
12	Belarus (BLR)	1	0	1	2
13	Germany (GER)	1	0	0	1
13	Sweden (SWE)	1	0	0	1
15	Yugoslavia (YUG)	0	1	1	2
16	Spain (ESP)	0	1	0	1
17	Greece (GRE)	0	0	1	1
17	Hungary (HUN)	0	0	1	1
17	Poland (POL)	0	0	1	1
17	West Germany (FRG)	0	0	1	1
Totals (20 entries)		48	47	50	145

Notes

- At the 2026 European Championships, the Croatian government banned the use of Russian flags and emblems despite World Gymnastics lifting the ban on Russian athletes; therefore the Russian team competed under the banner World Gymnastics 2. Their results here are attributed to Russia.
