= European Artistic Gymnastics Championships – Women's individual all-around =

The European Women's Artistic Gymnastics Championships were first held in 1957.

Three medals are awarded: gold for first place, silver for second place, and bronze for third place. Tie breakers have not been used in every year. In the event of a tie between two gymnasts, both names are listed, and the following position (second for a tie for first, third for a tie for second) is left empty because a medal was not awarded for that position. If three gymnastics tied for a position, the following two positions are left empty.

Svetlana Khorkina, with three golds and one silver, holds the record for most medals in this event. Khorkina and Nadia Comăneci are tied for most gold medals.

== Medalists ==
Year	Location	Gold	Silver	Bronze
1957	(Romania) Bucharest	(Soviet Union) Larisa Latynina	(Romania) Elena Leușteanu	(Romania) Sonia Iovan
1959	(Poland) Kraków	(Poland) Natalia Kot	(Romania) Elena Leușteanu	(Romania) Sonia Iovan
1961	(East Germany) Leipzig	(Soviet Union) Larisa Latynina	(Soviet Union) Polina Astakhova	(Czechoslovakia) Věra Čáslavská (East Germany) Ingrid Föst
1963	(France) Paris	(Socialist Federal Republic of Yugoslavia) Mirjana Bilić	(Sweden) Solveig Egman-Andersson	(Sweden) Ewa Rydell
1965	(Bulgaria) Sofia	(Czechoslovakia) Věra Čáslavská	(Soviet Union) Larisa Latynina	(East Germany) Birgit Radochla
1967	(Netherlands) Amsterdam	(Czechoslovakia) Věra Čáslavská	(Soviet Union) Zinaida Voronina	(Czechoslovakia) Marianna Némethová-Krajčírová
1969	(Sweden) Landskrona	(East Germany) Karin Büttner-Janz	(Soviet Union) Olga Karasyova	(Soviet Union) Ludmilla Tourischeva (East Germany) Erika Zuchold
1971	(Soviet Union) Minsk	(Soviet Union) Tamara Lazakovich (Soviet Union) Ludmilla Tourischeva	None awarded	(East Germany) Erika Zuchold
1973	(United Kingdom) London	(Soviet Union) Ludmilla Tourischeva	(Soviet Union) Olga Korbut	(East Germany) Kerstin Gerschau
1975	(Norway) Skien	(Romania) Nadia Comăneci	(Soviet Union) Nellie Kim	(East Germany) Annelore Zinke
1977	(Czechoslovakia) Prague	(Romania) Nadia Comăneci	(Soviet Union) Elena Mukhina	(Soviet Union) Nellie Kim
1979	(Denmark) Copenhagen	(Romania) Nadia Comăneci	(Romania) Emilia Eberle	(Soviet Union) Natalia Shaposhnikova
1981	(Spain) Madrid	(East Germany) Maxi Gnauck	(Romania) Cristina Elena Grigoraș	(Soviet Union) Alla Misnik
1983	(Sweden) Gothenburg	(Soviet Union) Olga Bicherova	(Romania) Lavinia Agache	(Romania) Ecaterina Szabo (Soviet Union) Albina Shishova
1985	(Finland) Helsinki	(Soviet Union) Yelena Shushunova	(East Germany) Maxi Gnauck	(Soviet Union) Oksana Omelianchik
1987	(Soviet Union) Moscow	(Romania) Daniela Silivaș	(Soviet Union) Aleftina Pryakhina	(Bulgaria) Diana Dudeva (Soviet Union) Yelena Shushunova
1989	(Belgium) Brussels	(Soviet Union) Svetlana Boginskaya	(Romania) Daniela Silivaș	(Soviet Union) Olga Strazheva
1990	(Greece) Athens	(Soviet Union) Svetlana Boginskaya	(Soviet Union) Natalia Kalinina	(Hungary) Henrietta Ónodi
1992	(France) Nantes	(Ukraine) Tatiana Gutsu	(Romania) Gina Gogean	(Romania) Vanda Hădărean
1994	(Sweden) Stockholm	(Romania) Gina Gogean	(Russia) Svetlana Khorkina (Russia) Dina Kochetkova	None awarded
1996	(United Kingdom) Birmingham	(Ukraine) Lilia Podkopayeva	(Belarus) Svetlana Boginskaya	(Romania) Lavinia Miloșovici
1998	(Russia) Saint Petersburg	(Russia) Svetlana Khorkina	(Romania) Simona Amânar	(Romania) Claudia Presăcan
2000	(France) Paris	(Russia) Svetlana Khorkina	(Russia) Elena Zamolodchikova	(Ukraine) Viktoria Karpenko
2002	(Greece) Patras	(Russia) Svetlana Khorkina	(Netherlands) Verona van de Leur	(Ukraine) Alona Kvasha
2004	(Netherlands) Amsterdam	(Ukraine) Alina Kozich	(Romania) Nicoleta Daniela Șofronie	(Russia) Elena Zamolodchikova
2005	(Hungary) Debrecen	(France) Marine Debauve	(Russia) Anna Pavlova	(Russia) Yulia Lozhechko
2007	(Netherlands) Amsterdam	(Italy) Vanessa Ferrari	(Romania) Sandra Izbașa	(Ukraine) Alina Kozich
2009	(Italy) Milan	(Russia) Ksenia Semyonova	(Russia) Ksenia Afanasyeva	(Switzerland) Ariella Käslin
2011	(Germany) Berlin	(Russia) Anna Dementyeva	(Germany) Elisabeth Seitz	(Romania) Amelia Racea
2013	(Russia) Moscow	(Russia) Aliya Mustafina	(Romania) Larisa Iordache	(Russia) Anastasia Grishina
2015	(France) Montpellier	(Switzerland) Giulia Steingruber	(Russia) Maria Kharenkova	(United Kingdom) Ellie Downie
2017	(Romania) Cluj-Napoca	(United Kingdom) Ellie Downie	(Hungary) Zsófia Kovács	(France) Mélanie de Jesus dos Santos
2019	(Poland) Szczecin	(France) Mélanie de Jesus dos Santos	(United Kingdom) Ellie Downie	(Russia) Angelina Melnikova
2021	(Switzerland) Basel	(Russia) Viktoria Listunova	(Russia) Angelina Melnikova	(United Kingdom) Jessica Gadirova
2022	(Germany) Munich	(Italy) Asia D'Amato	(United Kingdom) Alice Kinsella	(Italy) Martina Maggio
2023	(Turkey) Antalya	(United Kingdom) Jessica Gadirova	(Hungary) Zsófia Kovács	(Italy) Alice D'Amato
2024	(Italy) Rimini	(Italy) Manila Esposito	(Italy) Alice D'Amato	(United Kingdom) Alice Kinsella
2025	(Germany) Leipzig	(Italy) Manila Esposito	(Spain) Alba Petisco	(Romania) Ana Bărbosu
2026	(Croatia) Zagreb	(Russia) Angelina Melnikova	(Russia) Anna Kalmykova	(France) Elena Colas

== Medal table ==
Rank	Nation	Gold	Silver	Bronze	Total
1	Soviet Union (URS)	9	9	8	26
2	Russia (RUS)	8	8	4	20
3	Romania (ROU)	5	11	8	24
4	Italy (ITA)	4	1	2	7
5	Ukraine (UKR)	3	0	3	6
6	Great Britain (GBR)	2	2	3	7
7	East Germany (GDR)	2	1	6	9
8	Czechoslovakia (TCH)	2	0	2	4
8	France (FRA)	2	0	2	4
10	Switzerland (SUI)	1	0	1	2
11	Poland (POL)	1	0	0	1
11	Yugoslavia (YUG)	1	0	0	1
13	Hungary (HUN)	0	2	1	3
14	Sweden (SWE)	0	1	1	2
15	Belarus (BLR)	0	1	0	1
15	Germany (GER)	0	1	0	1
15	Netherlands (NED)	0	1	0	1
15	Spain (ESP)	0	1	0	1
19	Bulgaria (BUL)	0	0	1	1
Totals (19 entries)		40	39	42	121

Notes

- At the 2026 European Championships, the Croatian government banned the use of Russian flags and emblems despite World Gymnastics lifting the ban on Russian athletes; therefore the Russian team competed under the banner World Gymnastics 2. Their results here are attributed to Russia.

== See also ==
- European Men's and Women's Artistic Gymnastics Individual Championships
- European Women's Artistic Gymnastics Championships
- World Artistic Gymnastics Championships
