= Balance beam at the Olympics =

Olympic sport

Balance beam at the Olympic Games
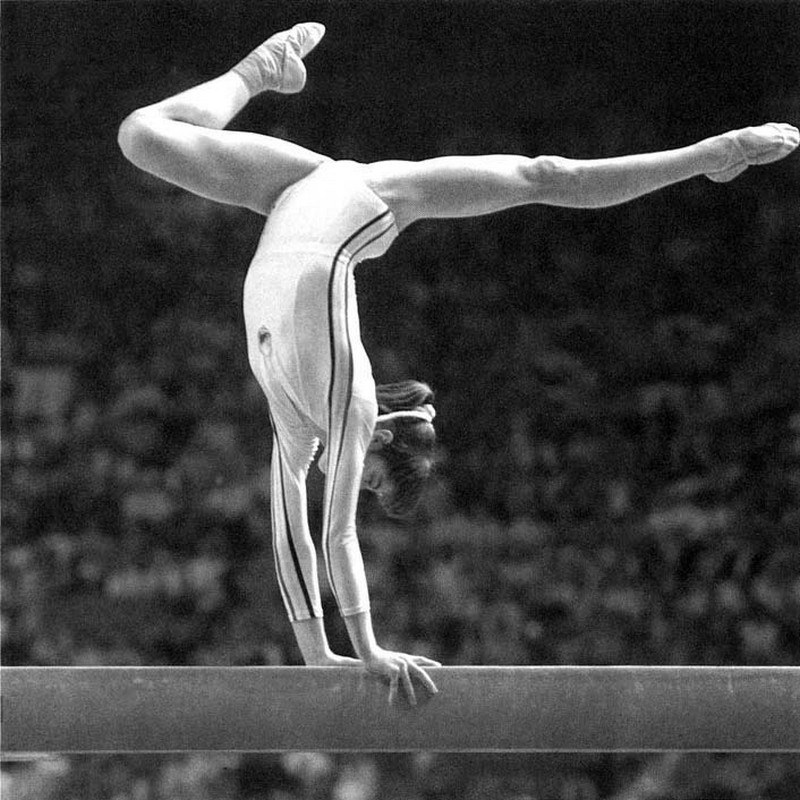
- Nadia Comăneci competing on the balance beam at the 1976 Summer Olympics

Overview
- Sport: Artistic gymnastics
- Gender: Women
- Years held: 1952 – 2024

Reigning champion
- Women: Alice D'Amato (ITA)

The balance beam is an artistic gymnastics event held at the Summer Olympics on which only women compete. Women started competing in and earning medals at apparatus finals in 1952.

== Medalists ==
=== Women ===
Games	Gold	Silver	Bronze
1952 Helsinki	Nina Bocharova; Soviet Union	Maria Gorokhovskaya; Soviet Union	Margit Korondi; Hungary
1956 Melbourne	Ágnes Keleti; Hungary	Eva Bosáková; Czechoslovakia Tamara Manina; Soviet Union	none awarded
1960 Rome	Eva Bosáková; Czechoslovakia	Larisa Latynina; Soviet Union	Sofia Muratova; Soviet Union
1964 Tokyo	Věra Čáslavská; Czechoslovakia	Tamara Manina; Soviet Union	Larisa Latynina; Soviet Union
1968 Mexico City	Natalia Kuchinskaya; Soviet Union	Věra Čáslavská; Czechoslovakia	Larisa Petrik; Soviet Union
1972 Munich	Olga Korbut; Soviet Union	Tamara Lazakovich; Soviet Union	Karin Janz; East Germany
1976 Montreal	Nadia Comăneci; Romania	Olga Korbut; Soviet Union	Teodora Ungureanu; Romania
1980 Moscow	Nadia Comăneci; Romania	Yelena Davydova; Soviet Union	Natalia Shaposhnikova; Soviet Union
1984 Los Angeles	Simona Păucă; Romania Ecaterina Szabo; Romania	none awarded	Kathy Johnson; United States
1988 Seoul	Daniela Silivaș; Romania	Yelena Shushunova; Soviet Union	Phoebe Mills; United States Gabriela Potorac; Romania
1992 Barcelona	Tatiana Lysenko; Unified Team	Lu Li; China Shannon Miller; United States	none awarded
1996 Atlanta	Shannon Miller; United States	Lilia Podkopayeva; Ukraine	Gina Gogean; Romania
2000 Sydney	Liu Xuan; China	Yekaterina Lobaznyuk; Russia	Yelena Produnova; Russia
2004 Athens	Cătălina Ponor; Romania	Carly Patterson; United States	Alexandra Eremia; Romania
2008 Beijing	Shawn Johnson; United States	Nastia Liukin; United States	Cheng Fei; China
2012 London	Deng Linlin; China	Sui Lu; China	Aly Raisman; United States
2016 Rio de Janeiro	Sanne Wevers; Netherlands	Laurie Hernandez; United States	Simone Biles; United States
2020 Tokyo	Guan Chenchen; China	Tang Xijing; China	Simone Biles; United States
2024 Paris	Alice D'Amato; Italy	Zhou Yaqin; China	Manila Esposito; Italy

==== Multiple medalists ====
Rank	Gymnast	Nation	Olympics	Gold	Silver	Bronze	Total
1	Nadia Comăneci	Romania	1976–1980	2	0	0	2
2	Eva Bosáková	Czechoslovakia	1956–1960	1	1	0	2
2	Věra Čáslavská	Czechoslovakia	1964–1968	1	1	0	2
2	Olga Korbut	Soviet Union	1972–1976	1	1	0	2
2	Shannon Miller	United States	1992–1996	1	1	0	2
6	Tamara Manina	Soviet Union	1956–1960	0	2	0	2
7	Larisa Latynina	Soviet Union	1960–1964	0	1	1	2
8	Simone Biles	United States	2016–2020	0	0	2	2

==== Medalists by country ====
Rank	Nation	Gold	Silver	Bronze	Total
1	Romania	6	0	4	10
2	Soviet Union	3	8	4	15
3	China	3	4	1	8
4	United States	2	4	5	11
5	Czechoslovakia	2	2	0	4
6	Hungary	1	0	1	2
6	Italy	1	0	1	2
8	Netherlands	1	0	0	1
8	Unified Team	1	0	0	1
10	Russia	0	1	1	2
11	Ukraine	0	1	0	1
12	East Germany	0	0	1	1

== Gallery ==
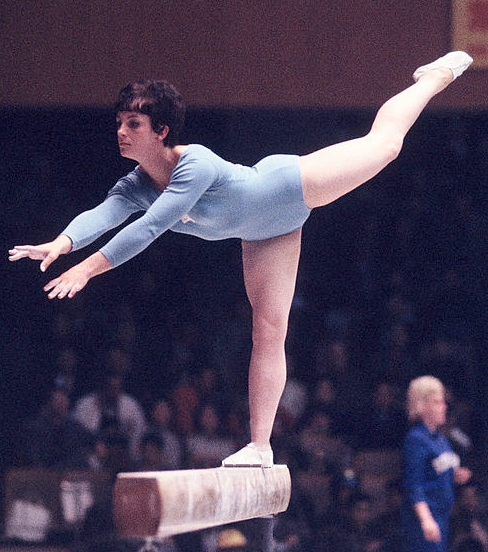
Denise Goddard, 1964

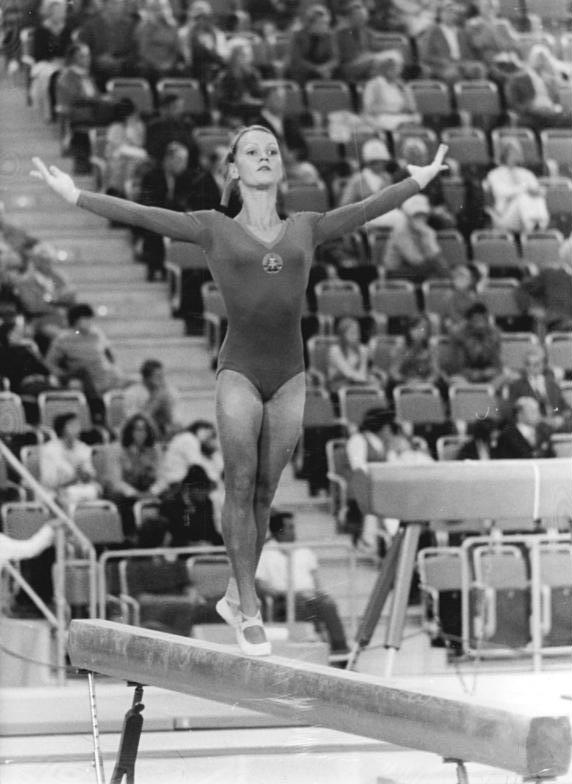
Karin Janz, 1972

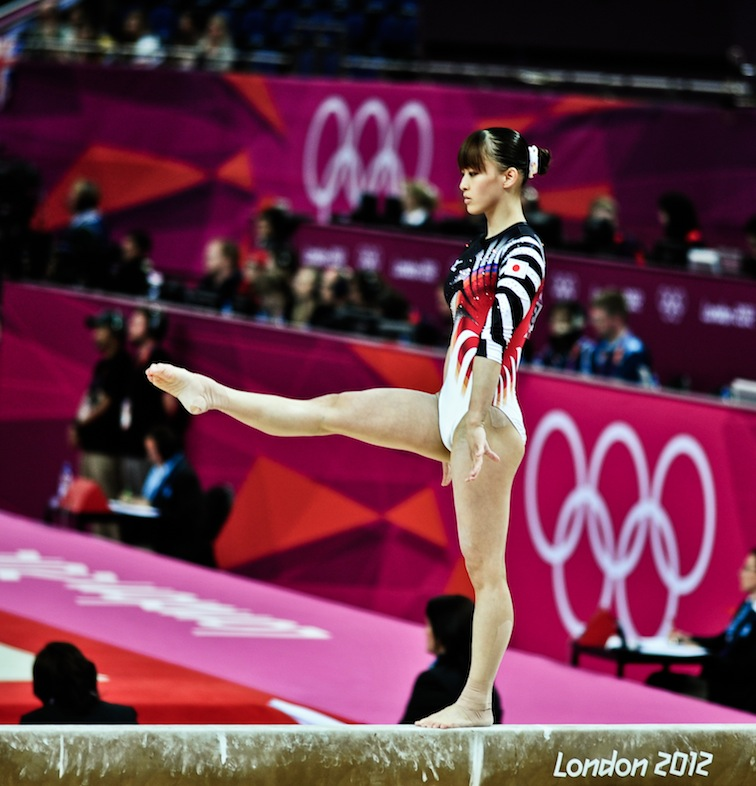
Rie Tanaka, 2012

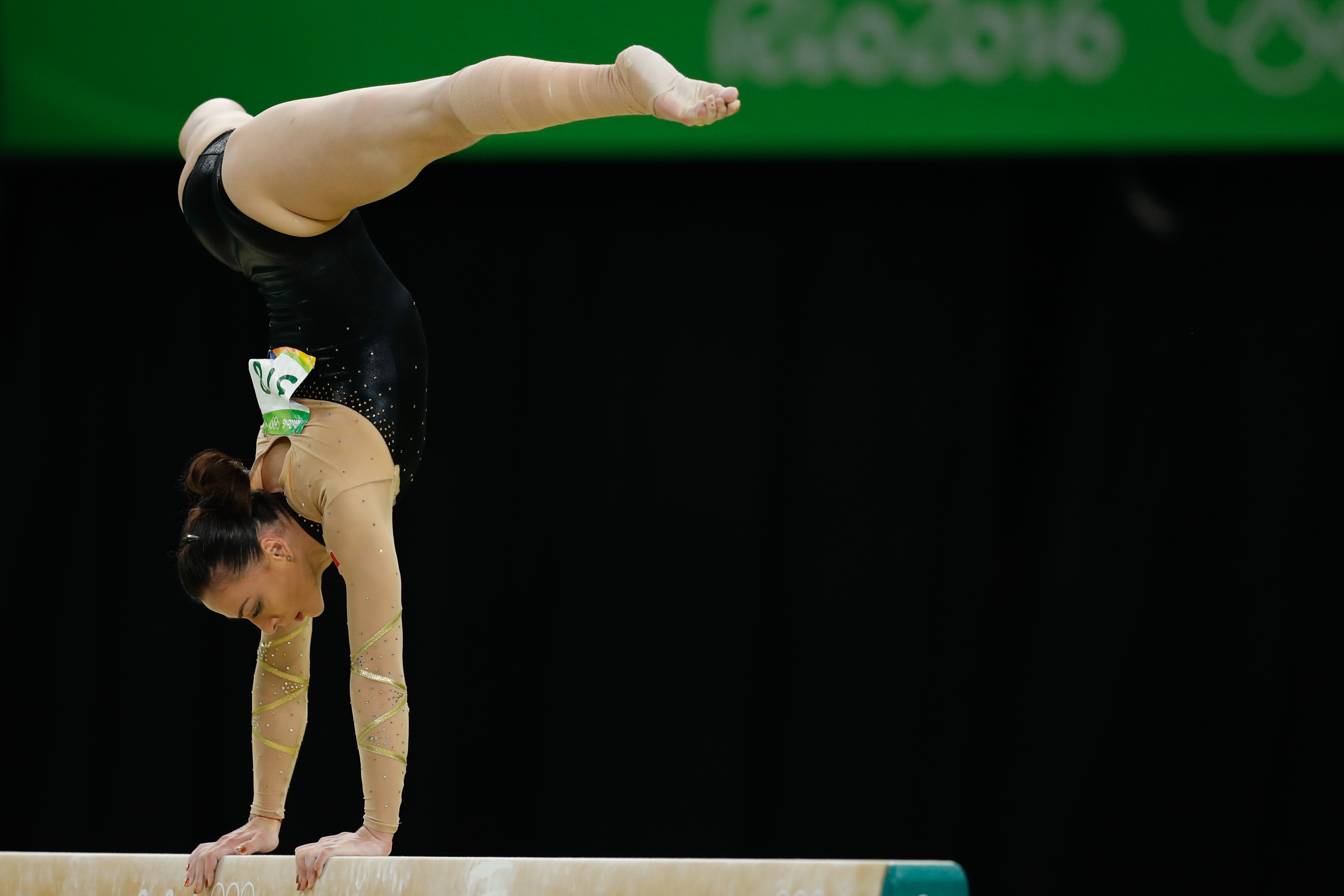
Cătălina Ponor, 2016

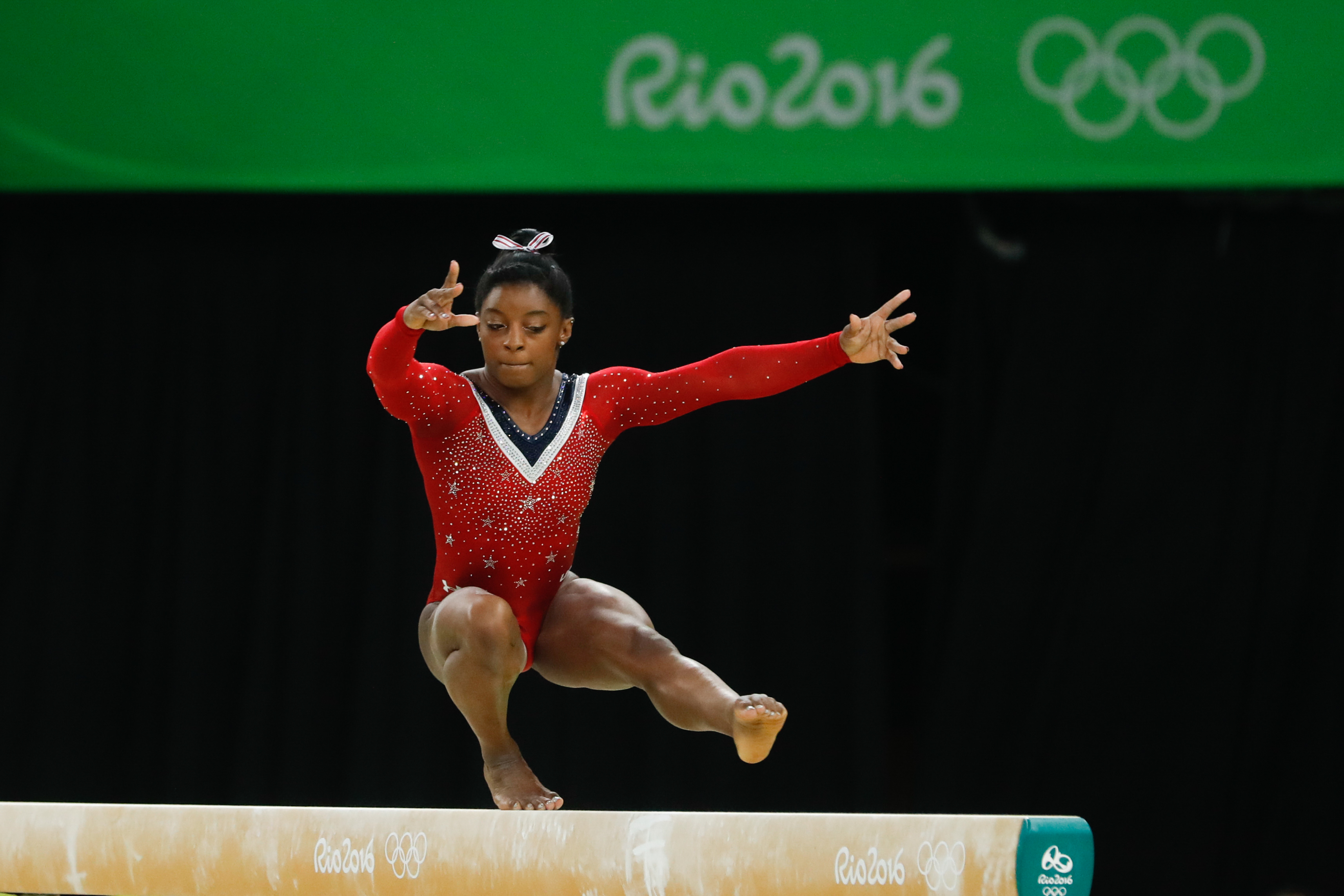
Simone Biles, 2016

Women's Balance Beam at the Olympics
