= 1961 European Women's Artistic Gymnastics Championships =

3rd European Women's Artistic Gymnastics Championships
- Location: Leipzig, East Germany
- Dates: 3–4 June 1961

The 3rd European Women's Artistic Gymnastics Championships were held in Leipzig, East Germany, from June 3–4, 1961.

== Medalists ==
Event	Gold	Silver	Bronze
Seniors
All-around	Larisa Latynina (URS)	Polina Astakhova (URS)	Věra Čáslavská (TCH); Ingrid Föst (GDR)
Vault	Ute Starke (GDR)	Ingrid Föst (GDR)	Natalia Kot (POL)
Uneven bars	Polina Astakhova (URS)	Larisa Latynina (URS)	Ingrid Föst (GDR)
Balance beam	Polina Astakhova (URS)	Larisa Latynina (URS)	Ingrid Föst (GDR)
Floor	Larisa Latynina (URS)	Polina Astakhova (URS)	Věra Čáslavská (TCH)

== Results ==
=== All-around ===
Rank	Gymnast	Vault (gymnastics)	Uneven bars	Balance beam	Floor (gymnastics)	Total
1st place, gold medalist(s)	Larisa Latynina (URS)	9.500	9.650	9.650	9.700	38.500
2nd place, silver medalist(s)	Polina Astakhova (URS)	9.200	9.700	9.700	9.600	38.200
3rd place, bronze medalist(s)	Věra Čáslavská (TCH)	9.450	9.500	9.650	9.550	38.150
3rd place, bronze medalist(s)	Ingrid Föst (GDR)	9.550	9.600	9.550	9.450	38.150
5	Ute Starke (GDR)	9.750	9.300	9.500	9.500	38.050
6	Elena Leușteanu (ROU)	9.100	9.500	9.300	9.450	37.500
7	Mirjana Bilić (YUG)	9.150	9.400	9.200	9.050	36.800
8	Sonia Iovan (ROU)	9.200	8.650	9.350	9.500	36.700
9	Judith Hamori (HUN)	9.400	9.050	9.500	9.100	36.600
10	Eva Bosáková (TCH)	8.950	8.750	9.500	9.350	36.550
10	Julia Trashlieva (BUL)	8.650	9.200	9.300	9.400	36.550

=== Vault ===
Rank	Gymnast	Score
1st place, gold medalist(s)	Ute Starke (GDR)	18.934
2nd place, silver medalist(s)	Ingrid Föst (GDR)	18.934
3rd place, bronze medalist(s)	Natalia Kot (POL)	19.010
4	Larisa Latynina (URS)	18.967
5	Judith Hamori (HUN)	18.867
6	Věra Čáslavská (TCH)	18.767

=== Uneven bars ===
Rank	Gymnast	Score
1st place, gold medalist(s)	Polina Astakhova (URS)	19.400
2nd place, silver medalist(s)	Larisa Latynina (URS)	19.250
3rd place, bronze medalist(s)	Ingrid Föst (GDR)	19.100
4	Elena Leușteanu (ROU)	19.067
5	Věra Čáslavská (TCH)	18.867
6	Mirjana Bilić (YUG)	18.767

=== Balance beam ===
Rank	Gymnast	Score
1st place, gold medalist(s)	Polina Astakhova (URS)	19.433
2nd place, silver medalist(s)	Larisa Latynina (URS)	19.317
3rd place, bronze medalist(s)	Ingrid Föst (GDR)	19.183
4	Ute Starke (GDR)	19.033
5	Eva Bosáková (TCH)	19.000
6	Rayna Grigorova (BUL)	18.867
7	Věra Čáslavská (TCH)	18.217

=== Floor ===
Rank	Gymnast	Score
1st place, gold medalist(s)	Larisa Latynina (URS)	19.400
2nd place, silver medalist(s)	Polina Astakhova (URS)	19.267
3rd place, bronze medalist(s)	Věra Čáslavská (TCH)	19.217
4	Ute Starke (GDR)	19.200
5	Ingrid Föst (GDR)	19.050
5	Elena Leușteanu (ROU)	19.050
7	Sonia Iovan (ROU)	19.000
