= List of top female medalists at major artistic gymnastics events =

== Individual women who won eight or more medals ==
=== World Artistic Gymnastics Championships ===
The years listed for each gymnast only include World Championships where they won medals. American gymnast Simone Biles holds the record for the most World Championship medals (30), as well as the most gold medals (23) in World Championship history for an athlete of either sex.

| Rank | Gymnast | Nation | Years | Gold | Silver | Bronze | Total | Ref. |
|---|---|---|---|---|---|---|---|---|
| 1 | Simone Biles | United States | 2013–2023 | 23 | 4 | 3 | 30 | |
| 2 | Svetlana Khorkina | Russia | 1994–2003 | 9 | 8 | 3 | 20 | |
| 3 | Gina Gogean | Romania | 1993–1997 | 9 | 2 | 4 | 15 | |
| 4 | Larisa Latynina (Diriy) | Soviet Union | 1954–1966 | 9 | 4 | 1 | 14 | |
| 5 | Lavinia Miloșovici | Romania | 1991–1996 | 5 | 3 | 5 | 13 | |
| 6 | Aliya Mustafina | Russia | 2010–2018 | 3 | 4 | 5 | 12 | |
| 7 | Ludmilla Tourischeva | Soviet Union | 1970–1974 | 7 | 2 | 2 | 11 | |
| 8 | Nellie Kim | Soviet Union | 1974–1979 | 5 | 4 | 2 | 11 | |
| 8 | Yelena Shushunova | Soviet Union | 1985–1987 | 5 | 4 | 2 | 11 | |
| 10 | Oksana Chusovitina | Soviet Union; CIS; Uzbekistan; Germany | 1991–2011 | 3 | 4 | 4 | 11 | |
| 11 | Eva Bosáková | Czechoslovakia | 1954–1962 | 2 | 8 | 1 | 11 | |
| 12 | Daniela Silivaș | Romania | 1985–1989 | 7 | 2 | 1 | 10 | |
| 13 | Simona Amânar | Romania | 1994–1999 | 6 | 4 | 0 | 10 | |
| 14 | Věra Čáslavská | Czechoslovakia | 1958–1966 | 4 | 5 | 1 | 10 | |
| 15 | Rebeca Andrade | Brazil | 2021–2026 | 4 | 4 | 2 | 10 | |
| 15 | Alicia Sacramone | United States | 2005–2011 | 4 | 4 | 2 | 10 | |
| 17 | Angelina Melnikova | Russia; RGF; AIN | 2019–2025 | 3 | 4 | 3 | 10 | |
| 18 | Ecaterina Szabo | Romania | 1983–1987 | 2 | 6 | 2 | 10 | |
| 19 | Tamara Manina | Soviet Union | 1954–1962 | 6 | 1 | 2 | 9 | |
| 20 | Svetlana Boginskaya | Soviet Union; CIS | 1987–1992 | 5 | 3 | 1 | 9 | |
| 20 | Shannon Miller | United States | 1991–1995 | 5 | 3 | 1 | 9 | |
| 22 | Maxi Gnauck | East Germany | 1979–1983 | 5 | 1 | 3 | 9 | |
| 23 | Nastia Liukin | United States | 2005–2007 | 4 | 5 | 0 | 9 | |
| 24 | Andreea Răducan | Romania | 1999–2001 | 5 | 1 | 2 | 8 | |
| 25 | Keiko Ikeda (Tanaka) | Japan | 1954–1966 | 1 | 1 | 6 | 8 | |

== Individual women who won medals in every event ==
This section lists the female Artistic Gymnasts who have won at least one medal in every event (team final, all-around, Vault, Uneven Bars, Balance Beam, and Floor Exercise) at the World Artistic Gymnastics Championships. The years listed refer to the World Championships at which the gymnast won her first medal in the event; the dates of any subsequent medals she may have won in the same event are not listed. The Soviet gymnast Larisa Latynina was the first gymnast to have been World Champion in every event. Larisa Latynina and Věra Čáslavská have been a World Champion or Olympic Champion in every event. Lavinia Milosovici is the last gymnast to have been a World Champion or Olympic Champion in every event final.

Listed separately are the gymnasts who have at some point in their career won medals in every event either in the World Championships or in the Olympic Games; gymnasts who have won medals in all six events at the same World Championships; and the gymnasts who have won medals in all six events at the same Olympic Games.

=== Medaled in every event over their career ===
Gymnasts who won medals in every event at the World Championships
| Gymnast | Nation | TF | AA | VT | UB | BB | FX | Year accomplished | Ref. |
|---|---|---|---|---|---|---|---|---|---|
| Larisa Latynina | Soviet Union | 1954 | 1958 | 1958 | 1958 | 1958 | 1958 | 1958 | |
| Natalia Kuchinskaya | Soviet Union | 1966 | 1966 | 1966 | 1966 | 1966 | 1966 | 1966 | |
| Ludmilla Tourischeva | Soviet Union | 1970 | 1970 | 1970 | 1970 | 1974 | 1970 | 1974 | |
| Olga Korbut | Soviet Union | 1974 | 1974 | 1974 | 1974 | 1974 | 1974 | 1974 | |
| Ecaterina Szabo | Romania | 1983 | 1983 | 1983 | 1983 | 1985 | 1983 | 1985 | |
| Yelena Shushunova | Soviet Union | 1985 | 1985 | 1985 | 1987 | 1985 | 1985 | 1987 | |
| Lavinia Miloșovici | Romania | 1991 | 1994 | 1991 | 1992 | 1991 | 1994 | 1994 | |
| Svetlana Khorkina | Russia | 1994 | 1995 | 1994 | 1994 | 1997 | 1997 | 1997 | |
| Aliya Mustafina | Russia | 2010 | 2010 | 2010 | 2010 | 2013 | 2010 | 2013 | |
| Simone Biles | United States | 2014 | 2013 | 2013 | 2018 | 2013 | 2013 | 2018 | |
| Rebeca Andrade | Brazil | 2023 | 2022 | 2021 | 2021 | 2023 | 2022 | 2023 | |

Gymnasts who won medals in every event at World Championships or Olympic Games (Note: The years in which the medals were won in the Olympic Games are in bold.)
| Gymnast | Nation | TF | AA | VT | UB | BB | FX | Year accomplished | Ref. |
|---|---|---|---|---|---|---|---|---|---|
| Maria Gorokhovskaya | Soviet Union | 1954 | **1952** | **1952** | **1952** | **1952** | 1954 | 1954 | |
| Helena Rakoczy | Poland | **1956** (Note: Rakoczy did not win a Team Final medal at the Olympics or World Championships. Poland did however win the bronze in the Team Portable Apparatus) | 1950 | 1950 | 1950 | 1950 | 1950 | 1956 | |
| Věra Čáslavská | Czechoslovakia | 1958 | 1962 | 1962 | **1968** | 1966 | 1962 | 1968 | |
| Nadia Comăneci | Romania | 1978 | **1976** | 1978 | **1976** | 1978 | **1976** | 1978 | |
| Maxi Gnauck | East Germany | 1979 | 1979 | 1981 | 1979 | 1981 | **1980** | 1981 | |
| Daniela Silivaş | Romania | 1987 | 1987 | **1988** | 1987 | 1985 | 1987 | 1988 | |

=== Medaled in every event at a single edition ===
Gymnasts who won medals in every event at a single World Championships
| Gymnast | Nation | Year accomplished |
|---|---|---|
| Larisa Latynina | Soviet Union | 1958, 1962 |
| Natalia Kuchinskaya | Soviet Union | 1966 |
| Ludmilla Tourischeva | Soviet Union | 1974 |
| Olga Korbut | Soviet Union | 1974 |
| Yelena Shushunova | Soviet Union | 1987 |
| Simone Biles | United States | 2018 |

Gymnasts who won medals in every event at a single Olympic Games
| Gymnast | Nation | Year accomplished |
|---|---|---|
| Maria Gorokhovskaya | Soviet Union | 1952 |
| Larisa Latynina | Soviet Union | 1960, 1964 |
| Věra Čáslavská | Czechoslovakia | 1968 |
| Daniela Silivaş | Romania | 1988 |

== See also ==
- List of Olympic medal leaders in women's gymnastics
- List of female artistic gymnasts with the most appearances at Olympic Games
