= 1962 World Artistic Gymnastics Championships =

Gymnastics competition

- Location: Prague, Czechoslovakia

The 15th Artistic Gymnastics World Championships were held on July 3–8, 1962 in Prague, the capital of Czechoslovakia, this being the 3rd time that Prague hosted these championships.

These were the last championships China competed in until 1979. Following a 1964 vote to accept Taiwan as a member nation, China withdrew from the International Gymnastics Federation in protest. They would not rejoin until 1978.

== Medallists ==
Event	Gold	Silver	Bronze
Men
Team all-around	Japan; Nobuyuki Aihara; Yukio Endo; Takashi Mitsukuri; Takashi Ono; Shuji Tsurumi; Haruhiro Yamashita	Soviet Union; Valery Kerdemelidi; Viktor Leontyev; Viktor Lisitsky; Boris Shakhlin; Pavel Stolbov; Yuri Titov	Czechoslovakia; Pavel Gajdoš; Karel Klečka; Přemysl Krbec; Václav Kubíčka; Ladislav Pazdera; Jaroslav Šťastný
Individual all-around	(Soviet Union) Yuri Titov	(Japan) Yukio Endo	(Soviet Union) Boris Shakhlin
Floor	(Japan) Nobuyuki Aihara (Japan) Yukio Endo	none awarded	(Italy) Franco Menichelli
Pommel horse	(Socialist Federal Republic of Yugoslavia) Miroslav Cerar	(Soviet Union) Boris Shakhlin	(Japan) Takashi Mitsukuri (China) Yu Lifeng
Rings	(Soviet Union) Yuri Titov	(Japan) Yukio Endo (Soviet Union) Boris Shakhlin	none awarded
Vault	(Czechoslovakia) Přemysl Krbec	(Japan) Haruhiro Yamashita	(Soviet Union) Boris Shakhlin (Japan) Yukio Endo
Parallel bars	(Socialist Federal Republic of Yugoslavia) Miroslav Cerar	(Soviet Union) Boris Shakhlin	(Japan) Yukio Endo
Horizontal bar	(Japan) Takashi Ono	(Japan) Yukio Endo (Soviet Union) Pavel Stolbov	none awarded
Women
Team all-around	Soviet Union; Polina Astakhova; Lidiya Ivanova; Larisa Latynina; Tamara Manina; Sofia Muratova; Irina Pervuschina	Czechoslovakia; Eva Bosáková; Věra Čáslavská; Libuse Cmiralova; Hana Růžičková; Ludmila Švédová; Adolfína Tkačíková	Japan; Ginko Abukawa; Keiko Ikeda; Taniko Nakamura; Kiyoko Ono; Toshiko Shirasu; Hiroko Tsuji
Individual all-around	(Soviet Union) Larisa Latynina	(Czechoslovakia) Věra Čáslavská	(Soviet Union) Irina Pervuschina
Vault	(Czechoslovakia) Věra Čáslavská	(Soviet Union) Larisa Latynina	(Soviet Union) Tamara Manina
Uneven bars	(Soviet Union) Irina Pervuschina	(Czechoslovakia) Eva Bosáková	(Soviet Union) Larisa Latynina
Balance beam	(Czechoslovakia) Eva Bosáková	(Soviet Union) Larisa Latynina	(Japan) Keiko Ikeda (Hungary) Anikó Ducza
Floor	(Soviet Union) Larisa Latynina	(Soviet Union) Irina Pervuschina	(Czechoslovakia) Věra Čáslavská

== Men's results ==
=== Team competition ===
Rank	Team	Compulsory	Optional	Total
1st place, gold medalist(s)	Japan	285.650	289.000	574.650
2nd place, silver medalist(s)	Soviet Union	285.700	287.450	573.150
3rd place, bronze medalist(s)	Czechoslovakia	280.450	281.050	561.500
4	China	278.450	280.550	559.000
5	Italy	278.200	279.000	557.200
6	United States	273.650	281.600	555.250
7	Finland	274.250	280.650	554.900
8	East Germany	275.450	279.050	554.500
9	Switzerland	274.050	278.900	552.950
10	Yugoslavia	274.800	277.900	552.700
11	Bulgaria	275.450	276.300	551.750
12	Hungary	273.800	276.850	550.650
13	Poland	276.050	274.300	550.350
14	France	272.400	270.750	543.150
15	Sweden	269.200	272.550	541.750
16	West Germany	267.550	270.650	538.200
17	United Arab Republic	257.950	259.300	517.250
18	Canada	248.900	255.950	504.850
19	Cuba	231.500	230.250	461.750
20	Turkey	171.350	202.800	374.150

=== Individual all-around ===
Rank	Gymnast	Total
1st place, gold medalist(s)	Yuri Titov (URS)	115.650
2nd place, silver medalist(s)	Yukio Endo (JPN)	115.500
3rd place, bronze medalist(s)	Boris Shakhlin (URS)	115.200
4	Takashi Ono (JPN)	115.150
5	Miroslav Cerar (YUG)	114.950
6	Takashi Mitsukuri (JPN)	114.300
7	Haruhiro Yamashita (JPN)	114.100
8	Pavel Stolbov (URS)	114.000
9	Valery Kerdemelidi (URS)	113.850
9	Shuji Tsurumi (JPN)	113.850
11	Franco Menichelli (ITA)	113.600
12	Nobuyuki Aihara (JPN)	113.450

=== Floor exercise ===
Rank	Gymnast	Total
1st place, gold medalist(s)	Nobuyuki Aihara (JPN)	19.500
1st place, gold medalist(s)	Yukio Endo (JPN)	19.500
3rd place, bronze medalist(s)	Franco Menichelli (ITA)	19.450
4	Haruhiro Yamashita (JPN)	19.300
5	Takashi Ono (JPN)	19.275
6	Jaroslav Stastny (TCH)	19.000

=== Pommel horse ===
Rank	Gymnast	Total
1st place, gold medalist(s)	Miroslav Cerar (YUG)	19.750
2nd place, silver medalist(s)	Boris Shakhlin (URS)	19.375
3rd place, bronze medalist(s)	Takashi Mitsukuri (JPN)	19.300
3rd place, bronze medalist(s)	Yu Lifeng (CHN)	19.300
5	Yuri Titov (URS)	19.275
6	Valery Kerdemelidi (URS)	18.400

=== Rings ===
Rank	Gymnast	Total
1st place, gold medalist(s)	Yuri Titov (URS)	19.550
2nd place, silver medalist(s)	Yukio Endo (JPN)	19.425
2nd place, silver medalist(s)	Boris Shakhlin (URS)	19.425
4	Nobuyuki Aihara (JPN)	19.250
5	Viktor Leontyev (URS)	19.225
6	Miroslav Cerar (YUG)	19.200

=== Vault ===
Rank	Gymnast	Total
1st place, gold medalist(s)	Přemysl Krbec (TCH)	19.550
2nd place, silver medalist(s)	Haruhiro Yamashita (JPN)	19.350
3rd place, bronze medalist(s)	Boris Shakhlin (URS)	19.225
3rd place, bronze medalist(s)	Yukio Endo (JPN)	19.225
5	Takashi Ono (JPN)	19.175
6	Siegfried Fülle (GDR)	19.075

=== Parallel Bars ===
Rank	Gymnast	Total
1st place, gold medalist(s)	Miroslav Cerar (YUG)	19.625
2nd place, silver medalist(s)	Boris Shakhlin (URS)	19.600
3rd place, bronze medalist(s)	Yukio Endo (JPN)	19.500
4	Haruhiro Yamashita (JPN)	19.375
5	Takashi Ono (JPN)	19.250
6	Valery Kerdemelidi (URS)	19.125

=== Horizontal Bar ===
Rank	Gymnast	Total
1st place, gold medalist(s)	Takashi Ono (JPN)	19.675
2nd place, silver medalist(s)	Yukio Endo (JPN)	19.625
2nd place, silver medalist(s)	Pavel Stolbov (URS)	19.625
4	Takashi Mitsukuri (JPN)	19.500
4	Yuri Titov (URS)	19.500
6	Miroslav Cerar (YUG)	19.425

== Women's results ==
=== Team competition ===
Rank	Team	Compulsory	Optional	Total
1st place, gold medalist(s)	Soviet Union	190.461	194.527	384.988
2nd place, silver medalist(s)	Czechoslovakia	188.562	194.028	382.590
3rd place, bronze medalist(s)	Japan	186.861	192.662	379.523
4	Hungary	185.562	192.228	377.790
5	East Germany	184.626	190.660	375.286
6	China	183.795	189.193	372.988
7	Poland	181.726	190.161	371.887
8	United States	179.926	188.426	368.352
9	Romania	180.859	186.061	366.920
10	Sweden	181.194	185.661	366.855
11	Yugoslavia	179.228	183.526	362.754
12	France	179.262	182.661	361.923
13	West Germany	175.226	179.692	354.918
14	Finland	171.262	180.860	352.122
15	Israel	170.495	175.494	345.989
16	Canada	160.693	170.292	330.985
17	Cuba	137.095	154.727	291.822

=== Individual all-around ===
Rank	Gymnast	Total
1st place, gold medalist(s)	Larisa Latynina (URS)	78.030
2nd place, silver medalist(s)	Věra Čáslavská (TCH)	77.732
3rd place, bronze medalist(s)	Irina Pervuschina (URS)	77.465
4	Eva Bosáková (TCH)	76.898
5	Tamara Manina (URS)	76.865
6	Keiko Ikeda (JPN)	76.832
7	Ingrid Föst (GDR)	76.631
8	Polina Astakhova (URS)	76.330
9	Judith Hamori (HUN)	76.264
10	Toshiko Shirasu (JPN)	76.064
11	Kiyoko Ono (JPN)	75.965
12	Natalia Kot (POL)	75.931

=== Vault ===
Rank	Gymnast	Total
1st place, gold medalist(s)	Věra Čáslavská (TCH)	19.649
2nd place, silver medalist(s)	Larisa Latynina (URS)	19.632
3rd place, bronze medalist(s)	Tamara Manina (URS)	19.549
4	Birgit Radochla (GDR)	19.483
5	Ingrid Föst (GDR)	19.466
6	Irina Pervuschina (URS)	19.433

=== Uneven bars ===
Rank	Gymnast	Total
1st place, gold medalist(s)	Irina Pervuschina (URS)	19.566
2nd place, silver medalist(s)	Eva Bosáková (TCH)	19.466
3rd place, bronze medalist(s)	Larisa Latynina (URS)	19.449
4	Polina Astakhova (URS)	19.399
5	Věra Čáslavská (TCH)	19.366
6	Katalin Makray (HUN)	19.316

=== Balance beam ===
Rank	Gymnast	Total
1st place, gold medalist(s)	Eva Bosáková (TCH)	19.499
2nd place, silver medalist(s)	Larisa Latynina (URS)	19.416
3rd place, bronze medalist(s)	Keiko Ikeda (JPN)	19.366
3rd place, bronze medalist(s)	Anikó Ducza (HUN)	19.366
5	Věra Čáslavská (TCH)	19.333
6	Irina Pervuschina (URS)	19.250

=== Floor exercise ===
Rank	Gymnast	Total
1st place, gold medalist(s)	Larisa Latynina (URS)	19.716
2nd place, silver medalist(s)	Irina Pervuschina (URS)	19.616
3rd place, bronze medalist(s)	Věra Čáslavská (TCH)	19.550
4	Polina Astakhova (URS)	19.466
4	Eva Bosáková (TCH)	19.466
6	Toshiko Shirasu (JPN)	19.416

== Medal table ==
Rank	Nation	Gold	Silver	Bronze	Total
1	Soviet Union (URS)	6	8	5	19
2	Japan (JPN)	4	4	5	13
3	Czechoslovakia (TCH)	3	3	2	8
4	Yugoslavia (SFR Yugoslavia)	2	0	0	2
5	China (People's Republic of China)	0	0	1	1
5	Hungary (HUN)	0	0	1	1
5	Italy (ITA)	0	0	1	1
Totals (7 entries)		15	15	15	45
