= Elena Leușteanu =

Romanian artistic gymnast

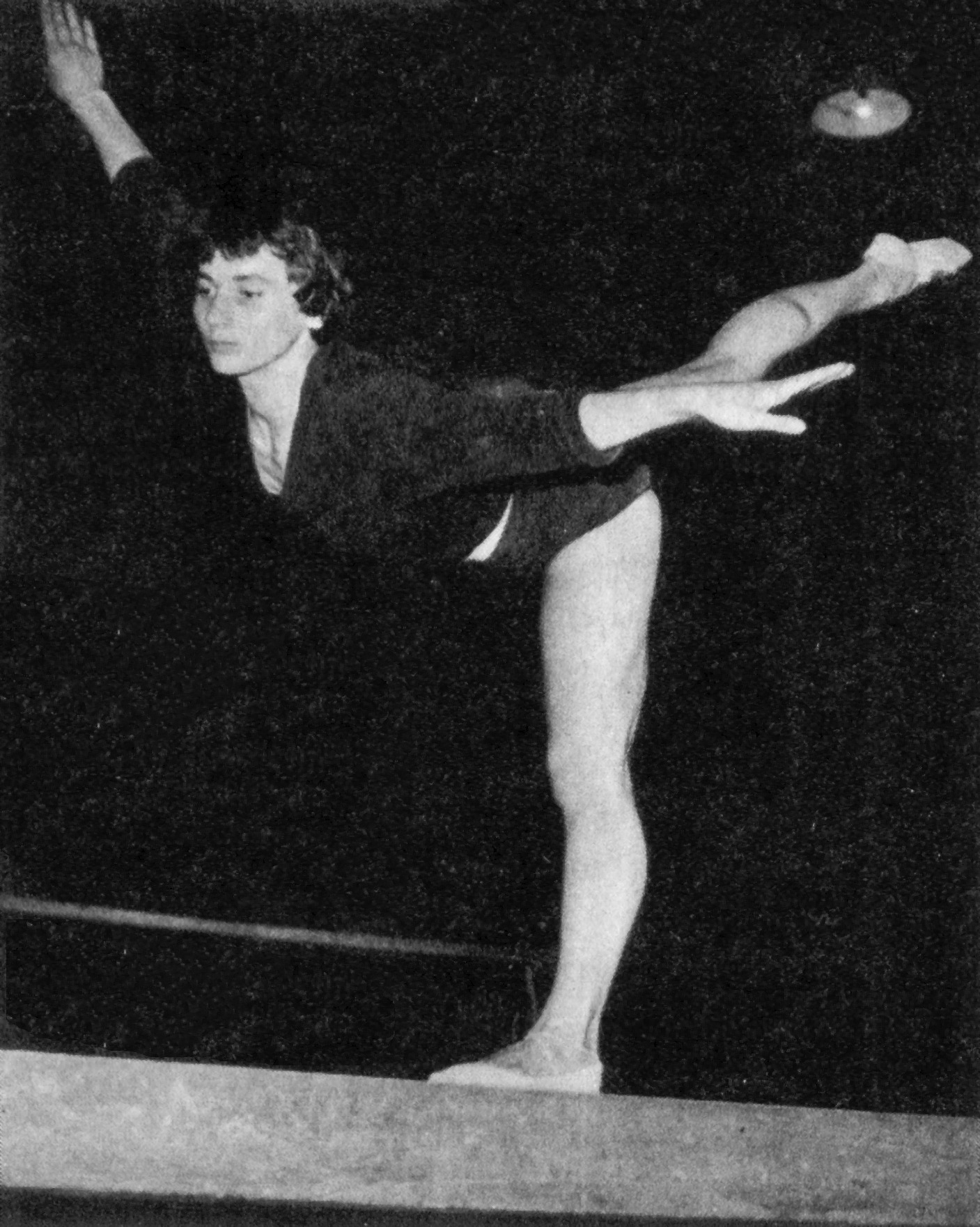

Personal information
- Full name: Elena Leușteanu
- Born: 4 July 1935 Cernăuți, Kingdom of Romania (present day Cernivtsi, Ukraine)
- Died: 16 August 2008 (aged 73) Bucharest, Romania
- Height: 162 cm (5 ft 4 in)

Gymnastics career
- Discipline: Women's artistic gymnastics
- Country represented: Romania
Medal record
Representing Romania
Olympic Games
Bronze medal – third place	1956 Melbourne	Team
Bronze medal – third place	1956 Melbourne	Floor exercise
Bronze medal – third place	1960 Rome	Team
World Championships
Bronze medal – third place	1958 Moscow	Team
European Championships
Silver medal – second place	1957 Bucharest	All-around
Silver medal – second place	1957 Bucharest	Uneven bars
Silver medal – second place	1957 Bucharest	Floor exercise
Silver medal – second place	1959 Kraków	All-around
Silver medal – second place	1959 Kraków	Uneven bars

Elena Leușteanu-Popescu (later Teodorescu, 4 July 1935 – 16 August 2008) was a Romanian artistic gymnast who competed at the 1956, 1960 and 1964 Olympics. During her career she won three Olympic bronze medals, one world bronze medal and five continental silver medals. She was the first Romanian artistic gymnast to win an individual Olympic medal (in 1956).

== Early years ==
As a teenager Leușteanu showed talents in handball, athletics, cross-country skiing and gymnastics. In 1949 she won a junior national title in athletics triathlon. In 1953, when she was a member of the national athletics team, she had her best results at 5.14 m in the long jump and 1.43 m in the high jump. In 1951 she also became a member of the national gymnastics team.

== 1954–1956: world championships and Olympic debut ==
Leușteanu made her debut at the 1954 World Championships in Rome, Italy, where she placed 4th with her team, 5th in the individual combined standings, and was a vault finalist.

At the 1956 Melbourne Olympics, Leușteanu led her Romanian team the bronze medal at these games, a first for Romania at any World Championships or Olympics. In the individual combined standings, she tied Olga Tass of Hungary for 4th place, just .100 behind bronze medal position. She qualified for three of the four event finals: vault, where she placed 6th; balance beam, where she placed 6th; and floor exercise, where she became the first Romanian woman to win an individual Olympic gymnastics medal – a bronze.

== 1957–1960: continued success ==
The first ever European Artistic Gymnastics Championships for women, held in 1957 in Bucharest in her native country of Romania, saw Leușteanu win the silver in the individual all-around competition behind Soviet Larisa Latynina. In the event finals, she collected two more medals in both the uneven bars and floor exercises.

In Moscow at the 1958 World Championships, competing as Elena Teodorescu, she helped her team to the bronze medal and placed 17th in the all around and was, again, a vault finalist.

At the second European Artistic Gymnastics Championships for women, held in 1959 in Kraków, Poland, she repeated her 2nd-place all-around finish and qualified to three of the four event finals where she won silver on the uneven bars as she had at the previous European Championships.

At the 1960 Rome Olympics, she buttressed her stronger teammate Sonia Iovan, helping their team to the bronze and she was 11th in the individual all around.

== Later life ==
In Leușteanu's 3rd appearance at the European Championships held in 1961 in Leipzig, East Germany, she placed 6th in the all-around and qualified to two event finals – uneven bars and floor where she placed 4th and 5th, respectively. In 1964 she was a member of the team representing Romania at the Olympic Games. She placed 6th with the team and 20th all around.

In 2006, at a celebration commemorating the 100th anniversary of the Romanian Gymnastics Federation, Leușteanu was the first gymnast to be mentioned and honoured and clips of her performance on the uneven bars were presented. She took part in the celebration, ascending to the podium along with other notable Romanian gymnasts of the past such as Nadia Comăneci, Daniela Silivaş, and Lavinia Miloșovici.

While her fellow Romanians were at the 2008 Beijing Summer Olympics, successfully defending the legacy of Romanian gymnastics she helped to create, Leușteanu died from pancreatic cancer in mid-August 2008 at the age of 73.
