= 1959 European Women's Artistic Gymnastics Championships =

2nd European Women's Artistic Gymnastics Championships
- Location: Kraków, Poland
- Dates: 3–4 June 1959

The 2nd European Women's Artistic Gymnastics Championships were held in Kraków.

== Medalists ==
Event	Gold	Silver	Bronze
Seniors
All-around	Natalia Kot (POL)	Elena Leușteanu (ROU)	Sonia Iovan (ROU)
Vault	Natalia Kot (POL)	Věra Čáslavská (TCH)	Ingrid Föst (GDR)
Uneven bars	Polina Astakhova (URS)	Elena Leușteanu (ROU)	Ingrid Föst (GDR)
Balance beam	Věra Čáslavská (TCH)	Sonia Iovan (ROU)	Natalia Kot (POL)
Floor	Polina Astakhova (URS)	Tamara Manina (URS)	Eva Bosáková (TCH)

== Results ==
=== All-around ===
Rank	Gymnast	Vault (gymnastics)	Uneven bars	Balance beam	Floor (gymnastics)	Total
1st place, gold medalist(s)	Natalia Kot (POL)	9.667	9.300	9.533	9.333	37.833
2nd place, silver medalist(s)	Elena Leușteanu (ROU)	9.467	9.567	9.533	9.200	37.767
3rd place, bronze medalist(s)	Sonia Iovan (ROU)	9.400	9.367	9.367	9.267	37.401
4	Anikó Ducza (HUN)	9.433	9.433	9.468	8.967	37.300
5	Eva Bosáková (TCH)	9.167	9.100	9.533	9.467	37.267
6	Ingrid Föst (GDR)	9.467	9.467	9.467	8.833	37.234
7	Polina Astakhova (URS)	9.433	9.700	9.667	8.233	37.033
8	Věra Čáslavská (TCH)	9.457	8.233	9.333	9.633	36.666
9	Olga Tass (HUN)	9.033	9.300	9.533	8.767	36.633
10	Tretanka Dimova (BUL)	9.567	8.867	9.233	9.133	36.600

=== Vault ===
Rank	Gymnast	Score
1st place, gold medalist(s)	Natalia Kot (POL)	19.010
2nd place, silver medalist(s)	Věra Čáslavská (TCH)	18.967
3rd place, bronze medalist(s)	Ingrid Föst (GDR)	18.934
4	Elena Leușteanu (ROU)	18.867
5	Mirjana Bilić (YUG)	18.766
6	Danièle Sicot-Coulon (FRA)	18.733

=== Uneven bars ===
Rank	Gymnast	Score
1st place, gold medalist(s)	Polina Astakhova (URS)	19.467
2nd place, silver medalist(s)	Elena Leușteanu (ROU)	19.200
3rd place, bronze medalist(s)	Ingrid Föst (GDR)	19.034
4	Anikó Ducza (HUN)	18.800
4	Sonia Iovan (ROU)	18.800
6	Tamara Manina (URS)	18.734

=== Balance beam ===
Rank	Gymnast	Score
1st place, gold medalist(s)	Věra Čáslavská (TCH)	19.166
2nd place, silver medalist(s)	Sonia Iovan (ROU)	18.867
3rd place, bronze medalist(s)	Natalia Kot (POL)	18.800
4	Eva Bosáková (TCH)	18.634
5	Tretanka Dimova (BUL)	18.333
6	Elena Leușteanu (ROU)	17.733

=== Floor ===
Rank	Gymnast	Score
1st place, gold medalist(s)	Polina Astakhova (URS)	19.400
2nd place, silver medalist(s)	Tamara Manina (URS)	19.200
3rd place, bronze medalist(s)	Eva Bosáková (TCH)	19.100
4	Elena Leușteanu (ROU)	19.033
5	Olga Tass (HUN)	18.966
6	Natalia Kot (POL)	18.833
