= Irina Pervushina =

Russian artistic gymnast

- Born: 1 April 1942 (age 84) Voronezh, Russia

Gymnastics career
- Discipline: Women's artistic gymnastics
- Club: Burevestnik Voronezh
Medal record
Representing the Soviet Union
World Championships
| Gold medal – first place | 1962 Prague | Uneven bars |
| Gold medal – first place | 1962 Prague | Team |
| Silver medal – second place | 1962 Prague | Floor |
| Bronze medal – third place | 1962 Prague | All-around |

Irina Ivanovna Pervuschina (Russian: Ирина Ивановна Первушина; born 1 April 1942) is a retired Russian artistic gymnast. She won four medals at the 1962 World Championships, including two gold medals, and attended the 1960 Summer Olympics as a substitute.
