= Natalia Kot =

Polish former artistic gymnast

Medal record

Gymnastics

Representing Poland

Olympic Games
Bronze medal – third place	1956 Melbourne	Team PA

European Championships
Gold medal – first place	1959 Kraków	All-Around
Gold medal – first place	1959 Kraków	Vault
Bronze medal – third place	1959 Kraków	Balance Beam
Bronze medal – third place	1961 Leipzig	Vault

Natalia Kot-Wala (born 29 June 1938) is a Polish former artistic gymnast. She is the 1956 Olympic bronze medalist with the Polish team, 1959 European all-around and vault champion, as well as 2-time European bronze medalist. She also competed at the 1960 Summer Olympics.

== Career ==
She was a 3-time Polish all-around champion from 1959, 1961 and 1962. Throughout her career, she won 15 national titles

Kot competed at the 1956 Summer Olympic Games in Melbourne. She won a bronze medal in the team portable apparatus event, tying with the USSR team. Polish women also finished fourth in the all-around team competition, behind USSR, Hungary and Romania respectively. Individually, she finished 9th in the all-around with her country's second highest score. She also finished 7th on vault, tying with teammate and the 1950 World all-around champion Helena Rakoczy, 8th on the uneven bars, 13th on the balance beam and 14th on the floor exercise.

Two years later, she represented Poland at the 1958 World Artistic Gymnastics Championships in Moscow, where she finished 8th in the team all-around competition. She did not make any individual finals.

In 1959, she won the all-around title at the European Championships in Kraków. She also won a gold medal on vault and bronze on the balance beam and finished 6th on the floor exercise. She is the only Polish gymnast ever to win the European all-around gold.

She competed at the 1960 Summer Olympic Games in Rome, where she did not manage to win any medals. She finished 12th in the individual all-around, as well as 13th on vault, 9th on the uneven bars, 21st on the balance beam and 12th on the floor exercise. Polish team finished 5th behind USSR, Czechoslovakia, Romania and Japan.

One year later, she competed at the 1961 European Championships in Leipzig, where she won a bronze medal on vault.

In 1962, she competed at the World Championships in Prague, where she finished 7th with the Polish team.

== Personal life ==
She was born on 29 June 1938 in Bytków, Poland.

She is married to Polish ski jumper Piotr Wala, who competed at the 1964 Winter Olympic Games. They have a son. After retiring from gymnastics and finishing university, she worked in a primary school and became a gymnastics coach in Bielsko-Biała. She and her husband currently live in Bystra Śląska.
