= Tamara Manina =

Soviet Olympic gymnast (born 1934)

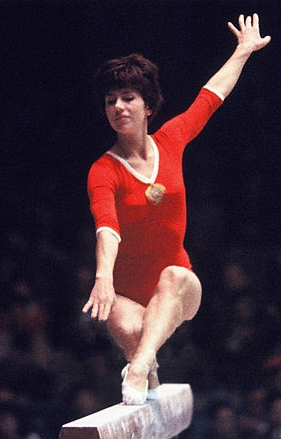
- Tamara Manina at the 1964 Olympics

Personal information
- Full name: Tamara Ivanovna Manina
- Nickname: Monia The Bird
- Born: 16 September 1934 (age 91) Petrozavodsk, Respublika Kareliya, Russian SFSR, Soviet Union
- Height: 1.62 m (5 ft 4 in)

Gymnastics career
- Discipline: Women's artistic gymnastics
- Country represented: Soviet Union
- Club: Burevestnik, Leningrad
Medal record
Olympic Games
Gold medal – first place	1956 Melbourne	Team
Gold medal – first place	1964 Tokyo	Team
Silver medal – second place	1956 Melbourne	Vault
Silver medal – second place	1956 Melbourne	Balance beam
Silver medal – second place	1964 Tokyo	Balance Beam
Bronze medal – third place	1956 Melbourne	Team PA
World Championships
Gold medal – first place	1954 Rome	Team
Gold medal – first place	1954 Rome	Vault
Gold medal – first place	1954 Rome	Floor exercise
Gold medal – first place	1958 Moscow	Team
Gold medal – first place	1962 Prague	Team
Silver medal – second place	1958 Moscow	Vault
Bronze medal – third place	1958 Moscow	All-around
Bronze medal – third place	1962 Prague	Vault
European Championships
Silver medal – second place	1957 Bucharest	Vault
Silver medal – second place	1959 Krakow	Floor exercise
Bronze medal – third place	1957 Bucharest	Balance beam

Tamara Ivanovna Manina (Russian: Тама́ра Ива́новна Ма́нина; born 16 September 1934) is a retired Soviet Olympic gymnast and a sports scientist.

== Biography ==
Her family lived in Petersburg (and later in Leningrad), but Manina was born in Petrozavodsk, where her father was on a long mission. During the German-Soviet War she was evacuated from besieged Leningrad into Tashkent. She returned into Leningrad in 1944 and began gymnastics at the Leningrad Young Pioneer Palace in the same year. She was called "Monia the Bird" by groupmates for her graceful and light vaults.

Competing as a junior, she won the all-around title at the USSR Nationals in 1953, and became a candidate for the USSR team. In the same year Manina debuted at the senior USSR Championships, placing 12th in the all-around. Between 1953 and 1964 Manina successfully competed in many national and international events.

One of Manina's most successful performances took place at the 1954 World Artistic Gymnastics Championships, where she earned several gold medals on vault, on the floor and in the team competition. At the 1956 Olympics she rivalled Ágnes Keleti, Larisa Latynina, and other strong competitors, and placed 6th in the all-around, but won silver medals on vault and balance beam. She also contributed to the team's gold and bronze medals. The USSR team won more gold medals than any other country at that year's Olympics. In one of her interviews Manina said, that the team had a warm welcome everywhere in the USSR: on their way by train from Vladivostok to Moscow they were met with flowers on each small station, people organized solemn meetings and made other arrangements to honor their visit.

Although in the event finals of the 1958 Worlds Manina, apart from the gold in the team competition, won a gold on the balance beam, and won a silver medal on vault, she placed 3rd in the all-around to Latynina and Eva Bosáková. She missed the 1960 Summer Olympics due to an injury, but competed in the 1962 World Artistic Gymnastics Championships, contributing to the team's gold and winning the bronze on vault. At age 30 she went to the 1964 Summer Olympics and won the team's gold and silver on the balance beam. Finishing her competitive career, Manina seriously injured her ankle during the display competition in Vienna and was not able to continue training afterward. She coached the French national team in 1975 and has been an international judge since 1971.

Manina is also known for her scientific activities. Starting in 1958, she studied at the Leningrad State Institute of Fine Mechanics and Optics, and graduated in 1965. She defended a dissertation for the Candidate of Science degree at the Lesgaft State Institute of Physical Culture in 1969 and taught at the gymnastics department of the institute until 1973. Since 1975 she has been a professor at the Saint Petersburg State Art-Industrial Academy. She has published more than 40 scientific, methodical and popular science books.

Tamara Manina lives and works in Saint Petersburg. She is married to Valery Lutkov, a sports medicine doctor, and has a son, also named Valery Lutkov, an international tennis official.

== See also ==
- List of top Olympic gymnastics medalists
- List of top medalists at the World Artistic Gymnastics Championships
- List of Olympic female gymnasts for the Soviet Union
