= 1958 World Artistic Gymnastics Championships =

Gymnastics competition

- Location: (Soviet Union) Moscow, USSR

The 14th Artistic Gymnastics World Championships were held on July 6–10, 1958 in Moscow, the capital of the USSR.

== Medallists ==
Event	Gold	Silver	Bronze
Men
Team all-around	Soviet Union; Albert Azaryan; Valentin Lipatov; Valentin Muratov; Boris Shakhlin; Pavel Stolbov; Yuri Titov	Japan; Nobuyuki Aihara; Akira Kono; Takashi Ono; Masao Takemoto; Katsumi Terai; Shinsaku Tsukawaki	Czechoslovakia; Jaroslav Bím; Ferdinand Daniš; Pavel Gajdoš; Karel Klečka; Jindřich Mikulec; Josef Škvor
Individual all-around	(Soviet Union) Boris Shakhlin	(Japan) Takashi Ono	(Soviet Union) Yuri Titov
Floor	(Japan) Masao Takemoto	(Japan) Takashi Ono	(Soviet Union) Yuri Titov
Pommel horse	(Soviet Union) Boris Shakhlin	(Soviet Union) Pavel Stolbov	(Socialist Federal Republic of Yugoslavia) Miroslav Cerar
Rings	(Soviet Union) Albert Azaryan	(Japan) Nobuyuki Aihara	(Soviet Union) Yuri Titov
Vault	(Soviet Union) Yuri Titov	(Japan) Masao Takemoto	(Japan) Takashi Ono
Parallel bars	(Soviet Union) Boris Shakhlin	(Japan) Takashi Ono	(Soviet Union) Pavel Stolbov
Horizontal bar	(Soviet Union) Boris Shakhlin	(Soviet Union) Albert Azaryan	(Soviet Union) Yuri Titov (Japan) Masao Takemoto
Women
Team all-around	Soviet Union; Polina Astakhova; Raisa Borisova; Lidiya Kalinina; Larisa Latynina; Tamara Manina; Sofia Muratova	Czechoslovakia; Eva Bosáková; Věra Čáslavská; Anna Marejková; Matylda Matoušková; Ludmila Švédová; Adolfína Tkačíková	Romania; Elena Mărgărit; Atanasia Ionescu; Sonia Iovan; Emilia Vătășoiu; Elena Săcălici; Elena Leuşteanu
Individual all-around	(Soviet Union) Larisa Latynina	(Czechoslovakia) Eva Bosáková	(Soviet Union) Tamara Manina
Vault	(Soviet Union) Larisa Latynina	(Soviet Union) Sofia Muratova (Soviet Union) Lidiya Kalinina (Soviet Union) Tamara Manina	none awarded
Uneven bars	(Soviet Union) Larisa Latynina	(Czechoslovakia) Eva Bosáková	(Soviet Union) Polina Astakhova
Balance beam	(Soviet Union) Larisa Latynina	(Soviet Union) Sofia Muratova	(Japan) Keiko Tanaka
Floor	(Czechoslovakia) Eva Bosáková	(Soviet Union) Larisa Latynina	(Japan) Keiko Tanaka

== Men's results ==
=== All-around ===
Rank	Gymnast	Total
1st place, gold medalist(s)	Boris Shakhlin (URS)	116.050
2nd place, silver medalist(s)	Takashi Ono (JPN)	115.600
3rd place, bronze medalist(s)	Yuri Titov (URS)	115.450
4	Masao Takemoto (JPN)	115.300
5	Pavel Stolbov (URS)	114.750
6	Nobuyuki Aihara (JPN)	114.300
7	Albert Azaryan (URS)	114.050
8	Valentin Lipatov (URS)	113.650
9	Shinsaku Tsukawaki (JPN)	112.750
9	Akira Kono (JPN)	112.750
11	Valentin Muratov (URS)	112.500
12	Ferdinand Daniš (TCH)	111.200

=== Floor exercise ===
Rank	Gymnast	Total
1st place, gold medalist(s)	Masao Takemoto (JPN)	19.550
2nd place, silver medalist(s)	Takashi Ono (JPN)	19.500
3rd place, bronze medalist(s)	Yuri Titov (URS)	19.400
4	Nobuyuki Aihara (JPN)	19.350
5	Pavel Stolbov (URS)	19.175
6	Katsumi Terai (JPN)	19.125

=== Pommel horse ===
Rank	Gymnast	Total
1st place, gold medalist(s)	Boris Shakhlin (URS)	19.550
2nd place, silver medalist(s)	Pavel Stolbov (URS)	19.375
3rd place, bronze medalist(s)	Miroslav Cerar (YUG)	19.350
4	Akira Kono (JPN)	19.125
5	Valentin Lipatov (URS)	19.075
6	Albert Azaryan (URS)	18.950

=== Rings ===
Rank	Gymnast	Total
1st place, gold medalist(s)	Albert Azaryan (URS)	19.875
2nd place, silver medalist(s)	Nobuyuki Aihara (JPN)	19.475
3rd place, bronze medalist(s)	Yuri Titov (URS)	19.455
4	Shinsaku Tsukawaki (JPN)	19.350
5	Masao Takemoto (JPN)	19.300
6	Takashi Ono (JPN)	19.175

=== Vault ===
Rank	Gymnast	Total
1st place, gold medalist(s)	Yuri Titov (URS)	19.350
2nd place, silver medalist(s)	Masao Takemoto (JPN)	19.150
3rd place, bronze medalist(s)	Takashi Ono (JPN)	19.125
4	Nobuyuki Aihara (JPN)	19.075
5	Valentin Lipatov (URS)	19.050
6	Boris Shakhlin (URS)	19.025

=== Parallel bars ===
Rank	Gymnast	Total
1st place, gold medalist(s)	Boris Shakhlin (URS)	19.650
2nd place, silver medalist(s)	Takashi Ono (JPN)	19.500
3rd place, bronze medalist(s)	Pavel Stolbov (URS)	19.425
4	Yuri Titov (URS)	19.325
5	Masao Takemoto (JPN)	19.200
6	Valentin Lipatov (URS)	19.175

=== Horizontal bar ===
Rank	Gymnast	Total
1st place, gold medalist(s)	Boris Shakhlin (URS)	19.575
2nd place, silver medalist(s)	Albert Azaryan (URS)	19.350
3rd place, bronze medalist(s)	Yuri Titov (URS)	19.300
3rd place, bronze medalist(s)	Masao Takemoto (JPN)	19.300
5	Pavel Stolbov (URS)	19.200
6	Takashi Ono (JPN)	19.025

=== Team final ===
Rank	Team	Compulsory	Optional	Total
1st place, gold medalist(s)	Soviet Union	287.300	288.150	575.450
2nd place, silver medalist(s)	Japan	284.050	288.550	572.600
3rd place, bronze medalist(s)	Czechoslovakia	273.700	275.600	549.300
4	Finland	271.100	278.050	549.150
5	Poland	269.300	272.550	541.850
6	Yugoslavia	269.250	271.800	541.050
7	United States	267.150	272.700	539.850
8	West Germany	267.250	271.850	539.100
9	East Germany	267.500	271.150	538.650
10	Bulgaria	265.400	271.800	537.200
11	China	265.750	264.200	529.950
12	France	259.000	270.550	529.550
13	Romania	262.050	266.350	528.400
14	Hungary	260.500	266.400	526.900
15	South Africa	216.400	236.300	452.700

== Women's results ==
=== All-around ===
Rank	Gymnast	Total
1st place, gold medalist(s)	Larisa Latynina (URS)	77.464
2nd place, silver medalist(s)	Eva Bosáková (TCH)	76.332
3rd place, bronze medalist(s)	Tamara Manina (URS)	76.167
4	Sofia Muratova (URS)	75.897
5	Keiko Tanaka (JPN)	75.797
6	Lidiya Kalinina (URS)	75.732
7	Polina Astakhova (URS)	74.996
8	Věra Čáslavská (TCH)	74.197
9	Elena Petroșanu (ROU)	74.097
9	Olga Lemhényi-Tass (HUN)	73.763
11	Raisa Borisova (URS)	73.730
12	Ludmila Švédová (TCH)	73.664

=== Vault ===
Rank	Gymnast	Total
1st place, gold medalist(s)	Larisa Latynina (URS)	19.233
2nd place, silver medalist(s)	Sofia Muratova (URS)	19.100
2nd place, silver medalist(s)	Lidiya Kalinina (URS)	19.100
2nd place, silver medalist(s)	Tamara Manina (URS)	19.100
5	Ann-Sofi Pettersson (SWE)	18.832
6	Elena Teodorescu (ROU)	18.799

=== Uneven bars ===
Rank	Gymnast	Total
1st place, gold medalist(s)	Larisa Latynina (URS)	19.499
2nd place, silver medalist(s)	Eva Bosáková (TCH)	19.300
3rd place, bronze medalist(s)	Polina Astakhova (URS)	19.199
4	Raisa Borisova (URS)	19.133
5	Tamara Manina (URS)	19.066
6	Lidiya Kalinina (URS)	18.966

=== Balance beam ===
Rank	Gymnast	Total
1st place, gold medalist(s)	Larisa Latynina (URS)	19.399
2nd place, silver medalist(s)	Sofia Muratova (URS)	19.099
3rd place, bronze medalist(s)	Keiko Tanaka (JPN)	19.066
4	Tamara Manina (URS)	18.999
5	Eva Bosáková (TCH)	18.933
6	Lidiya Kalinina (URS)	18.666

=== Floor exercise ===
Rank	Gymnast	Total
1st place, gold medalist(s)	Eva Bosáková (TCH)	19.400
2nd place, silver medalist(s)	Larisa Latynina (URS)	19.333
3rd place, bronze medalist(s)	Keiko Tanaka (JPN)	19.199
4	Sofia Muratova (URS)	19.166
5	Tamara Manina (URS)	19.032
6	Lidiya Kalinina (URS)	19.000

=== Team final ===
Rank	Team	Compulsory	Optional	Total
1st place, gold medalist(s)	Soviet Union	190.461	191.159	381.620
2nd place, silver medalist(s)	Czechoslovakia	183.859	187.996	371.855
3rd place, bronze medalist(s)	Romania	183.659	183.361	367.020
4	Japan	182.560	184.391	366.951
5	Hungary	181.527	183.860	365.387
6	Bulgaria	181.126	183.927	365.053
7	China	179.527	183.896	363.423
8	Poland	181.457	181.726	363.183
9	East Germany	180.262	182.795	363.057
10	France	178.628	180.194	358.822
11	Sweden	177.461	180.358	357.819
12	Yugoslavia	175.459	178.728	354.187
13	Finland	174.827	178.027	352.854

== Medals ==
Rank	Nation	Gold	Silver	Bronze	Total
1	Soviet Union (URS)	12	7	7	26
2	Japan (JPN)	1	6	4	11
3	Czechoslovakia (TCH)	1	3	1	5
4	Romania (ROU)	0	0	1	1
4	Yugoslavia (SFR Yugoslavia)	0	0	1	1
Totals (5 entries)		14	16	14	44
