= Kerstin Gerschau =

East German gymnast

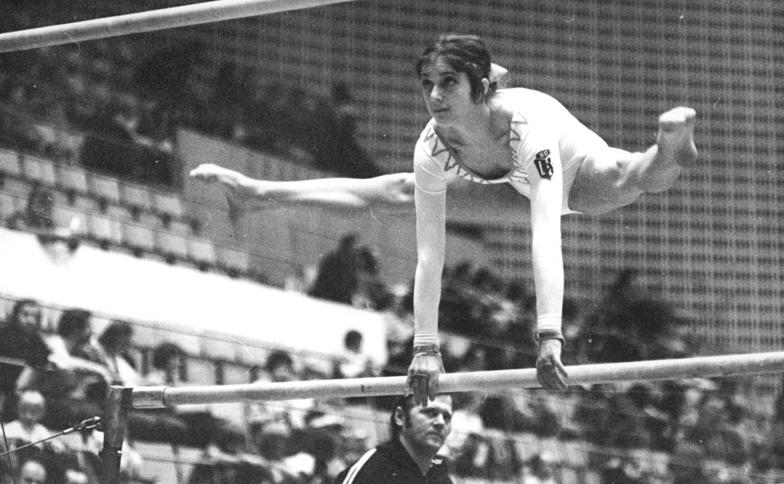
- Gerschau in 1976

Personal information
- Born: 26 January 1958 (age 68) Leipzig, East Germany
- Height: 1.61 m (5 ft 3 in)
- Spouse: Klaus-Dieter Kurrat

Gymnastics career
- Discipline: Women's artistic gymnastics
- Club: SC Leipzig
Medal record
Representing East Germany
Olympic Games
Bronze medal – third place	1976 Montreal	Team
European Championships
Silver medal – second place	1973 London	Floor
Bronze medal – third place	1973 London	All-around

Kerstin Gerschau (later Kurrat, born 26 January 1958) is a retired German gymnast. She competed at the 1976 Summer Olympics in all artistic gymnastics events and won a bronze medal in the team competition. Her best individual result was seventh place on uneven bars. She won a silver on the floor and a bronze all-around at the 1973 European championships.

Her father Helmut was a national gymnastics coach. After retiring from competitions, she studied choreography at the Theater Academy in Leipzig and received a degree in physical education from the German College of Physical Education. In 1978, she married Klaus-Dieter Kurrat, a German sprinter who also competed at the 1976 Olympics; they have three children. Since 1990 she runs her dance studio in Teltow.
