= Eva Bosáková =

Czech gymnast

- Eva Bosáková in c. 1960

Personal information
- Born: 18 December 1931 Mladá Boleslav, Czechoslovakia
- Died: 10 January 1991 (aged 59) Prague, Czechoslovakia

Sport
- Country: Czechoslovakia
Medal record
Olympic Games
| Gold medal – first place | 1960 Rome | Balance Beam |
| Silver medal – second place | 1956 Melbourne | Balance Beam |
| Silver medal – second place | 1960 Rome | Team |
| Bronze medal – third place | 1952 Helsinki | Team |
World Championships
| Gold medal – first place | 1958 Moscow | Floor Exercise |
| Gold medal – first place | 1962 Prague | Balance Beam |
| Silver medal – second place | 1954 Rome | All-Around |
| Silver medal – second place | 1954 Rome | Balance Beam |
| Silver medal – second place | 1954 Rome | Floor Exercise |
| Silver medal – second place | 1958 Moscow | Team |
| Silver medal – second place | 1958 Moscow | All-Around |
| Silver medal – second place | 1958 Moscow | Uneven Bars |
| Silver medal – second place | 1962 Prague | Team |
| Silver medal – second place | 1962 Prague | Uneven Bars |
| Bronze medal – third place | 1954 Rome | Team |
European Championships
| Bronze medal – third place | 1957 Bucharest | Balance Beam |
| Bronze medal – third place | 1957 Bucharest | Floor Exercise |
| Bronze medal – third place | 1959 Kraków | Floor Exercise |

Eva Bosáková-Hlaváčková (née Věchtová; 18 December 1931 – 10 January 1991) was a Czech gymnast who represented Czechoslovakia. Her career spanned at least from the 1954 World Championships to the 1962 World Championships. Her father was also a gymnast for the Czech national team at the 1936 Berlin Olympics.

== Career ==
During the time period of 1958–1962, Bosáková and her teammate Věra Čáslavská were among the leading Czechoslovak women gymnasts, at the championships during those years – the 1958 World Championships, 1959 European Championships, 1960 Olympics, 1961 European Championships, and 1962 World Championships.

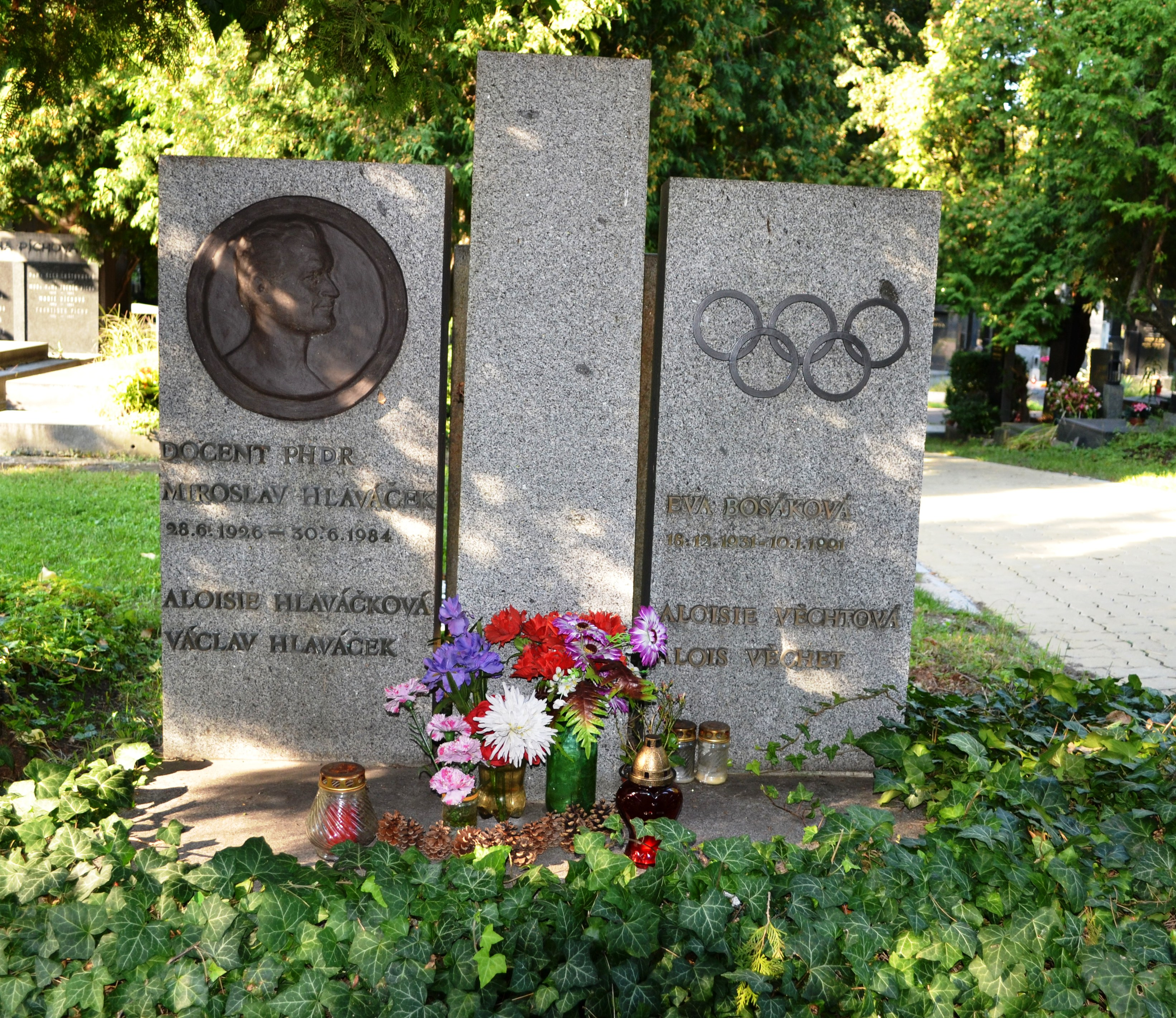
Grave of Eva Bosáková at Vinohrady Cemetery in Prague

On the balance beam, Bosáková became the first woman to perform a cartwheel in Olympic competition at the 1956 Olympics. According to the cited source, she won the balance beam title at the 1962 World Championships and the 1960 Olympics. She also earned all-around silver medals at the 1958 and 1962 World Championships.

After her competitive career was over, Bosáková became a member of the Czechoslovak Song and Dance Ensemble and later became a coach in her home country. She starred in the 1963 film Something Different, directed by Věra Chytilová, inspired in part by Bosáková's own gymnastic career.

== See also ==
- List of top medalists at the World Artistic Gymnastics Championships
