= Ludmila Švédová =

Czech gymnast

Olympic medal record

Women's gymnastics

Representing Czechoslovakia
Silver medal – second place	1960 Rome	Team

Ludmila Švédová (13 November 1936 – 10 February 2018) was a Czech gymnast who competed in the 1960 Summer Olympics. She was born in Šumperk.
