= 1973 European Women's Artistic Gymnastics Championships =

9th European Women's Artistic Gymnastics Championships
- Location: London, United Kingdom
- Dates: 20–27 October 1973

The 9th European Women's Artistic Gymnastics Championships were held in London, United Kingdom, in 1973.

== Medalists ==
Event	Gold	Silver	Bronze
Seniors
All-Around	Ludmilla Tourischeva (URS)	Olga Korbut (URS)	Kerstin Gerschau (GDR)
Vault	Ludmilla Tourischeva (URS); Angelika Hellmann (GDR)		Uta Schorn (FRG)
Uneven Bars	Ludmilla Tourischeva (URS)	Angelika Hellmann (GDR)	Alina Goreac (ROU)
Balance Beam	Ludmilla Tourischeva (URS)	Alina Goreac (ROU)	Anca Grigoraș (ROU)
Floor	Ludmilla Tourischeva (URS)	Kerstin Gerschau (GDR)	Alina Goreac (ROU)
