= 1965 European Women's Artistic Gymnastics Championships =

5th European Women's Artistic Gymnastics Championships
- Location: Sofia, Bulgaria
- Dates: 22–23 May 1965

The 1965 European Women's Artistic Gymnastics Championships were held in Sofia from May 22–23, 1965.

== Medalists ==
Event	Gold	Silver	Bronze
Seniors
All-around	Věra Čáslavská (TCH)	Larisa Latynina (URS)	Birgit Radochla (GDR)
Vault	Věra Čáslavská (TCH)	Ute Starke (GDR)	Larisa Latynina (URS)
Uneven bars	Věra Čáslavská (TCH)	Mariya Karashka (BUL); Larisa Latynina (URS)	
Balance beam	Věra Čáslavská (TCH)	Larisa Latynina (URS)	Larisa Petrik (URS); Birgit Radochla (GDR)
Floor	Věra Čáslavská (TCH)	Larisa Latynina (URS); Birgit Radochla (GDR)	

== Results ==
=== All-around ===
Rank	Gymnast	Vault (gymnastics)	Uneven bars	Balance beam	Floor (gymnastics)	Total
1st place, gold medalist(s)	Věra Čáslavská (TCH)	9.800	9.833	9.733	9.533	38.899
2nd place, silver medalist(s)	Larisa Latynina (URS)	9.666	9.633	9.533	9.366	38.198
3rd place, bronze medalist(s)	Birgit Radochla (GDR)	9.466	9.633	9.533	9.366	37.998
4	Larisa Petrik (URS)	9.433	9.500	9.466	9.266	37.665
5	Mariya Karashka (BUL)	9.600	9.566	9.400	8.966	37.532
6	Anikó Ducza (HUN)	9.233	9.433	9.200	9.333	37.199
7	Ute Starke (GDR)	9.700	9.133	9.233	9.100	37.166
8	Evelyne Letourneur (FRA)	9.333	9.333	9.000	9.100	36.766
9	Adolfína Tkačíková-Tačová (TCH)	9.466	9.566	8.233	9.300	36.565
10	Małgorzata Wilczek (POL)	9.400	9.133	9.000	8.966	36.532

=== Vault ===
Rank	Gymnast	Score
1st place, gold medalist(s)	Věra Čáslavská (TCH)	19.750
2nd place, silver medalist(s)	Ute Starke (GDR)	19.500
3rd place, bronze medalist(s)	Larisa Latynina (URS)	19.366
4	Mariya Karashka (BUL)	19.233
5	Adolfína Tkačíková-Tačová (TCH)	19.132
6	Birgit Radochla (GDR)	18.932

=== Uneven bars ===
Rank	Gymnast	Score
1st place, gold medalist(s)	Věra Čáslavská (TCH)	19.633
2nd place, silver medalist(s)	Mariya Karashka (BUL)	19.299
2nd place, silver medalist(s)	Larisa Latynina (URS)	19.299
4	Birgit Radochla (GDR)	19.266
5	Adolfína Tkačíková-Tačová (TCH)	19.232
6	Larisa Petrik (URS)	19.100

=== Balance beam ===
Rank	Gymnast	Score
1st place, gold medalist(s)	Věra Čáslavská (TCH)	19.433
2nd place, silver medalist(s)	Larisa Latynina (URS)	19.299
3rd place, bronze medalist(s)	Larisa Petrik (URS)	19.099
3rd place, bronze medalist(s)	Birgit Radochla (GDR)	19.099
5	Elena Ceampelea (ROU)	19.032
6	Mariya Karashka (BUL)	18.933

=== Floor ===
Rank	Gymnast	Score
1st place, gold medalist(s)	Věra Čáslavská (TCH)	19.333
2nd place, silver medalist(s)	Larisa Latynina (URS)	19.066
2nd place, silver medalist(s)	Birgit Radochla (GDR)	19.066
4	Anikó Ducza (HUN)	18.933
4	Larisa Petrik (URS)	18.933
6	Adolfína Tkačíková-Tačová (TCH)	18.900
