= 1957 European Women's Artistic Gymnastics Championships =

1st European Women's Artistic Gymnastics Championships
- Location: Bucharest, Romania
- Dates: 25–26 May 1957

The 1957 European Women's Artistic Gymnastics Championships took place in Bucharest, Romania. It was the first European competition for female artistic gymnastics.

== Medalists ==
Event	Gold	Silver	Bronze
Seniors
All-around	Larisa Latynina (URS)	Elena Leușteanu (ROU)	Sonia Iovan (ROU)
Vault	Larisa Latynina (URS)	Tamara Manina (URS)	Sonia Iovan (ROU)
Uneven bars	Larisa Latynina (URS)	Elena Leușteanu (ROU)	Eva Bosáková (TCH)
Balance beam	Larisa Latynina (URS)	Sonia Iovan (ROU)	Tamara Manina (URS)
Floor	Larisa Latynina (URS)	Elena Leușteanu (ROU)	Eva Bosáková (TCH)

== Results ==
=== All-around ===
Rank	Gymnast	Vault (gymnastics)	Uneven bars	Balance beam	Floor (gymnastics)	Total
1st place, gold medalist(s)	Larisa Latynina (URS)	9.666	9.500	9.666	9.633	38.465
2nd place, silver medalist(s)	Elena Leușteanu (ROU)	9.633	9.333	9.566	9.266	37.798
3rd place, bronze medalist(s)	Sonia Iovan (ROU)	9.500	9.433	9.333	9.333	37.599
4	Olga Tass (HUN)	9.433	9.300	9.366	9.333	37.432
5	Tamara Manina (URS)	9.433	9.133	9.333	9.500	37.399
6	Anna Marejková (TCH)	9.400	9.266	9.466	9.066	37.198
7	Eva Bosáková (TCH)	9.533	9.155	9.400	9.100	37.166
8	Danuta Nowak-Stachow (POL)	9.433	9.100	9.266	8.900	36.699
9	Danièle Sicot-Coulon (FRA)	9.300	8.900	9.333	9.100	36.633

=== Vault ===
Rank	Gymnast	Score
1st place, gold medalist(s)	Larisa Latynina (URS)	19.299
2nd place, silver medalist(s)	Tamara Manina (URS)	18.950
3rd place, bronze medalist(s)	Sonia Iovan (ROU)	18.733

=== Uneven bars ===
Rank	Gymnast	Score
1st place, gold medalist(s)	Larisa Latynina (URS)	19.466
2nd place, silver medalist(s)	Elena Leușteanu (ROU)	19.232
3rd place, bronze medalist(s)	Eva Bosáková (TCH)	19.066

=== Balance beam ===
Rank	Gymnast	Score
1st place, gold medalist(s)	Larisa Latynina (URS)	19.000
2nd place, silver medalist(s)	Sonia Iovan (ROU)	18.999
3rd place, bronze medalist(s)	Tamara Manina (URS)	18.733

=== Floor ===
Rank	Gymnast	Score
1st place, gold medalist(s)	Larisa Latynina (URS)	19.332
2nd place, silver medalist(s)	Elena Leușteanu (ROU)	19.266
3rd place, bronze medalist(s)	Eva Bosáková (TCH)	19.199
