= Polina Astakhova =

Soviet gymnast (1936–2005)

Polina Astakhova Полина Астахова
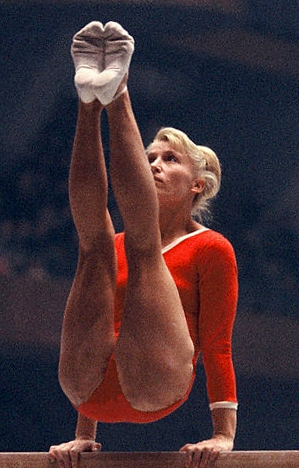
- Polina Astakhova at the 1964 Olympics

Personal information
- Full name: Polina Grigoryevna Astakhova; Поліна Григорівна Астахова; Полина Григорьевна Астахова
- Born: 30 October 1936 Zaporizhzhia, Ukrainian SSR, Soviet Union
- Died: 6 August 2005 (aged 68) Kyiv, Ukraine
- Height: 1.66 m (5 ft 5 in)

Gymnastics career
- Discipline: Women's artistic gymnastics
- Country represented: Soviet Union
- Club: Shakhtar Donetsk, Avangard Kyiv, CSKA Kyiv
Medal record
Representing Soviet Union
Olympic Games
Gold medal – first place	1956 Melbourne	Team
Gold medal – first place	1960 Rome	Team
Gold medal – first place	1960 Rome	Uneven Bars
Gold medal – first place	1964 Tokyo	Team
Gold medal – first place	1964 Tokyo	Uneven Bars
Silver medal – second place	1960 Rome	Floor Exercise
Silver medal – second place	1964 Tokyo	Floor Exercise
Bronze medal – third place	1956 Melbourne	Team, apparatus
Bronze medal – third place	1960 Rome	All-Around
Bronze medal – third place	1964 Tokyo	All-Around
World Championships
Gold medal – first place	1958 Moscow	Team
Gold medal – first place	1962 Prague	Team
Silver medal – second place	1966 Dortmund	Team
Bronze medal – third place	1958 Moscow	Uneven Bars
European championships
Gold medal – first place	1959 Krakow	Balance Beam
Gold medal – first place	1959 Krakow	Floor
Gold medal – first place	1961 Leipzig	Balance Beam
Gold medal – first place	1961 Leipzig	Uneven Bars
Silver medal – second place	1961 Leipzig	All-Around
Silver medal – second place	1961 Leipzig	Floor Exercise

Polina Ghrighorievna Astakhova (Ukrainian: Поліна Григорівна Астахова; 30 October 1936 – 5 August 2005) was a Soviet and Ukrainian artistic gymnast. She won ten medals at the 1956, 1960 and 1964 Summer Olympics.

== Biography ==
Astakhova became interested in artistic gymnastics at age 13, after she had watched the gymnastics championships in Donetsk, where their family moved a short time before. She trained in the local gymnastics sports club Shakhtyor under Vladimir Alieksandrovitch Smirnov.

Astakhova earned a nickname The Russian Birch in Western countries for her exceptional grace, and at the 1960 Olympics she was even called Madonna by the Italian journalists. Between 1956 and 1966 Astakhova was on top of many international and national competitions especially on the uneven bars apparatus event. She was a member of the USSR team between 1955 and 1968.

In 1954 Astakhova competed in the USSR Championships for the first time and in a year she made the USSR National team at the 1956 Summer Olympics. She was the youngest team member and contributed to the team's gold. At the 1960 Summer Olympics in Rome she led in the all-around, but lost a whole point for a fall on beam, which was the seventh routine of eight contested. She was very disappointed by the accident and even did not compete that year, although in Rome she won the gold in the team competition and on the bars, silver on the floor and bronze in the all-around. She recovered after the 1961 European Championships, where she won gold medals on the bars and on beam. Competing in the 1964 Summer Olympics, Astakhova contributed to the team's gold, won on the bars, was second on the floor and third in the all-around. She became the first gymnast to defend her Olympic gold medal in the uneven bars event. Her feat was only matched in 2000 by Svetlana Khorkina and later in 2016 by Aliya Mustafina.

After retiring from competitions, since 1972 Astakhova worked as a national coach in Ukraine. In 2002, she was inducted into the International Gymnastics Hall of Fame. Astakhova spent the last years of her life in Kyiv before her death at age 68 from pneumonia.

== Non-Olympic achievements ==
Year	Event	AA	Team	VT	UB	BB	FX
1956	USSR Championships	3rd			3rd		3rd
1957	USSR Championships				3rd		
1958	World Championships		1st		3rd		
1958	USSR Championships	3rd		3rd	2nd		3rd
1959	European Championships				1st		1st
1959	USSR Championships	1st			1st	2nd	1st
1959	USSR Cup	1st			1st	3rd	1st
1960	USSR Championships				1st	2nd	1st
1960	USSR Cup	1st					
1961	European Championships	2nd			1st	1st	2nd
1961	USSR Championships				2nd	1st	2nd
1961	USSR Cup				2nd	1st	
1962	World Championships		1st				
1962	USSR Championships	3rd			2nd		3rd
1963	USSR Championships	3rd			1st		2nd
1963	USSR Cup	1st		2nd	1st	2nd	1st
1964	USSR Championships				2nd		1st
1965	USSR Championships	2nd				3rd	
1965	USSR Cup	1st					
1966	World Championships		2nd				
1966	USSR Championships	3rd					
1967	USSR Championships				3rd		

== See also ==
- List of multiple Olympic medalists
- List of top Olympic gymnastics medalists
- List of Olympic female gymnasts for the Soviet Union
- List of multiple Summer Olympic medalists
