= Sonia Iovan =

Romanian gymnast (1935–2024)

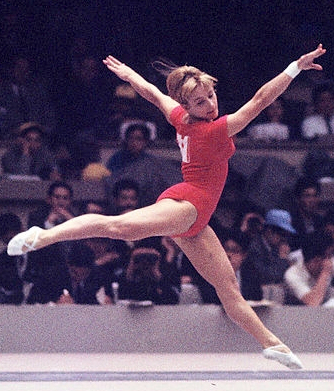
- Iovan in 1964

Personal information
- Full name: Sonia Iovan-Inovan
- Born: 29 September 1935 Cluj-Napoca, Romania
- Died: 6 September 2024 (aged 88) La Chapelle-de-Brain, France
- Height: 1.50 m (4 ft 11 in)

Gymnastics career
- Discipline: Women's artistic gymnastics
- Country represented: Romania
Medal record
Olympic Games
| Bronze medal – third place | 1960 Rome | Team |
| Bronze medal – third place | 1956 Melbourne | Team |
World Championships
| Bronze medal – third place | 1958 Moscow | Team |
European Championships
| Silver medal – second place | 1959 Krakow | Beam |
| Silver medal – second place | 1957 Bucharest | Beam |
| Bronze medal – third place | 1959 Krakow | All around |
| Bronze medal – third place | 1957 Bucharest | All around |
| Bronze medal – third place | 1957 Bucharest | Vault |

Sonia Iovan-Inovan (29 September 1935 – 6 September 2024) was a Romanian artistic gymnast who competed at the 1956, 1960, and 1964 Olympic Games. She was a double Olympic bronze medalist, a bronze world medalist and a multiple European medalist. Iovan died in France on 6 September 2024, at the age of 88.
