= Věra Čáslavská =

Czech gymnast (1942–2016)

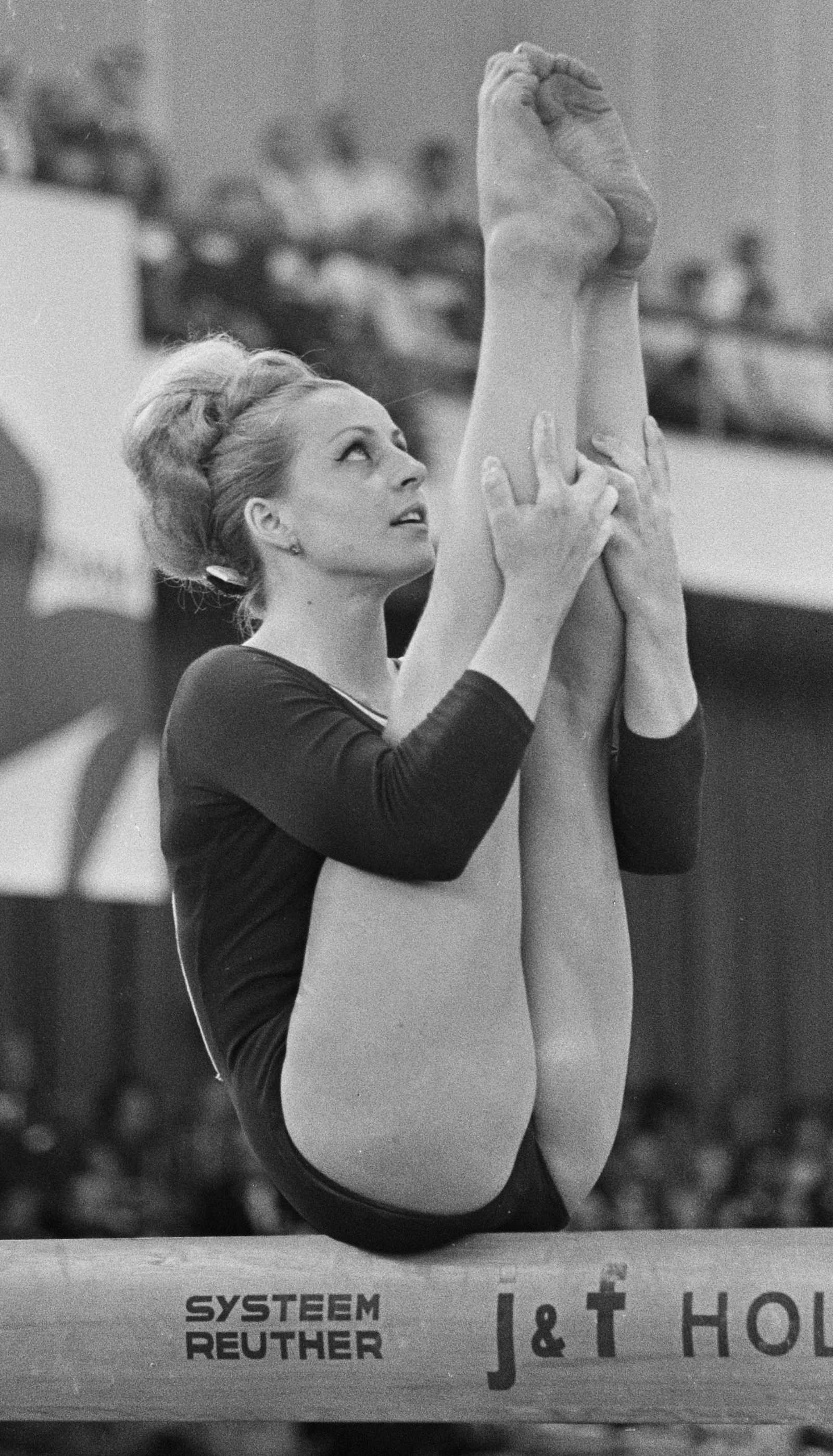
- Čáslavská at the 1967 European Championships

Personal information
- Full name: Věra Čáslavská
- Nicknames: Japanese: 「東京の恋人」 English: the love of Tokyo; Japanese: 「オリンピックの名花」 English: darling of the Olympic Games; Spanish: La Novia de México; English: The Bride of Mexico
- Born: 3 May 1942 Prague, Protectorate of Bohemia and Moravia
- Died: 30 August 2016 (aged 74) Prague, Czech Republic
- Height: 1.60 m (5 ft 3 in)

Gymnastics career
- Discipline: Women's artistic gymnastics
- Country represented: Czechoslovakia; (~1958–68)
- Retired: 1968
Medal record
Representing Czechoslovakia
Olympic Games
| Gold medal – first place | 1964 Tokyo | All-around |
| Gold medal – first place | 1964 Tokyo | Vault |
| Gold medal – first place | 1964 Tokyo | Balance beam |
| Gold medal – first place | 1968 Mexico City | All-around |
| Gold medal – first place | 1968 Mexico City | Vault |
| Gold medal – first place | 1968 Mexico City | Uneven bars |
| Gold medal – first place | 1968 Mexico City | Floor exercise |
| Silver medal – second place | 1960 Rome | Team |
| Silver medal – second place | 1964 Tokyo | Team |
| Silver medal – second place | 1968 Mexico City | Team |
| Silver medal – second place | 1968 Mexico City | Balance beam |
World Championships
| Gold medal – first place | 1962 Prague | Vault |
| Gold medal – first place | 1966 Dortmund | All-around |
| Gold medal – first place | 1966 Dortmund | Team |
| Gold medal – first place | 1966 Dortmund | Vault |
| Silver medal – second place | 1958 Moscow | Team |
| Silver medal – second place | 1962 Prague | All-around |
| Silver medal – second place | 1962 Prague | Team |
| Silver medal – second place | 1966 Dortmund | Balance beam |
| Silver medal – second place | 1966 Dortmund | Floor exercise |
| Bronze medal – third place | 1962 Prague | Floor exercise |
European Championships
| Gold medal – first place | 1959 Kraków | Balance beam |
| Gold medal – first place | 1965 Sofia | All-around |
| Gold medal – first place | 1965 Sofia | Vault |
| Gold medal – first place | 1965 Sofia | Uneven bars |
| Gold medal – first place | 1965 Sofia | Floor exercise |
| Gold medal – first place | 1965 Sofia | Balance beam |
| Gold medal – first place | 1967 Amsterdam | All-around |
| Gold medal – first place | 1967 Amsterdam | Vault |
| Gold medal – first place | 1967 Amsterdam | Uneven bars |
| Gold medal – first place | 1967 Amsterdam | Floor exercise |
| Gold medal – first place | 1967 Amsterdam | Balance beam |
| Silver medal – second place | 1959 Kraków | Vault |
| Bronze medal – third place | 1961 Leipzig | All-around |

Věra Čáslavská (Czech pronunciation: [ˈvjɛra ˈtʃaːslafskaː]; 3 May 1942 – 30 August 2016) was a Czechoslovak artistic gymnast and Czech sports official. She won a total of 22 international titles between 1959 and 1968 including seven Olympic gold medals, four world titles and eleven European championships. Čáslavská is the most decorated Czech gymnast in history and is one of only three female gymnasts, along with the Soviet Larisa Latynina and American Simone Biles, to win the all-around gold medal at two Olympics. She remains the only gymnast, male or female, to have won an Olympic gold medal in each individual event. She was also the first gymnast to achieve a perfect 10 at a major competition in the post-1952 era. She held the record for the most individual gold medals (with 7) among all female athletes (not only gymnasts) in Olympic history as well until it was surpassed by swimmer Katie Ledecky in 2024 after 56 years.

In addition to her gymnastics success, Čáslavská was known for her outspoken support of the Czechoslovak democratization movement and her opposition to the 1968 Soviet-led invasion of Czechoslovakia. At the 1968 Olympics in Mexico City, she took this protest to the world stage by quietly looking down and away while the Soviet national anthem was played during the medal ceremonies for the balance beam and floor exercise event finals. While Čáslavská's actions were applauded by her compatriots, they resulted in her becoming a persona non grata in the new regime. She was forced into retirement and for many years was denied the right to travel, work and attend sporting events.

Čáslavská's situation improved in the 1980s after the intervention of members of the International Olympic Committee, and following the Velvet Revolution her status got better significantly. During the 1990s she held several positions of honor, including a term as president of the Czech Olympic Committee.

== Gymnastics career ==
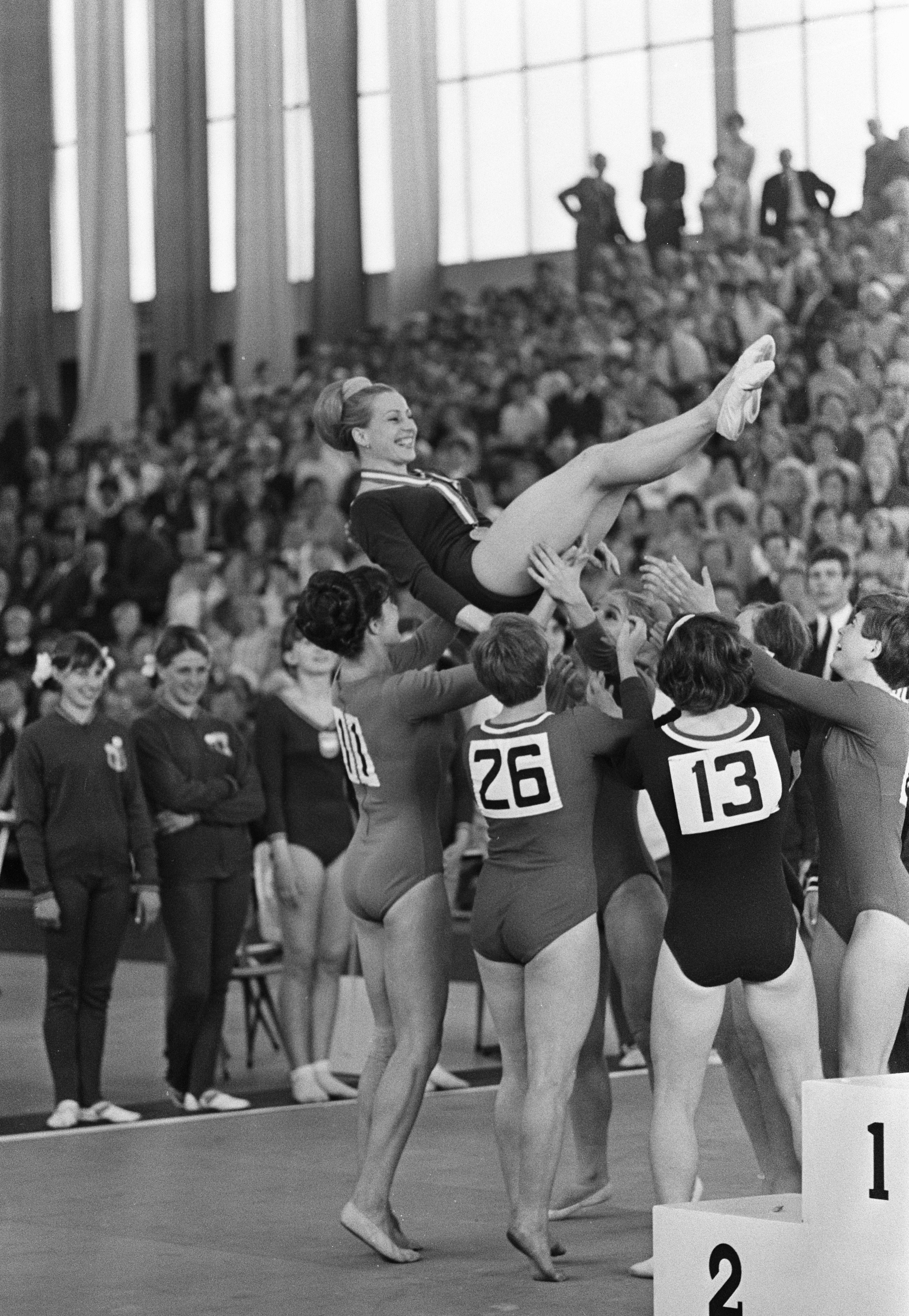
Čáslavská and the Czechoslovak team at the 1967 European Championships

Born in Prague and originally a figure skater, Čáslavská debuted internationally in 1958 at the World Artistic Gymnastics Championships, winning a silver medal in the team event. Her first international title came the following year at the European Women's Artistic Gymnastics Championships where she won gold on the vault and silver on the balance beam. She first participated in the 1960 Summer Olympic Games, winning a silver medal with the Czechoslovak team, and then won bronze in the all around event at the 1961 European Championships. She fought for the all-around title at home in the 1962 World Championships, held off only by Larisa Latynina, and managed to win her first world title, in the vault. She did not compete at the 1963 European Championships in Paris.

Between 1964 and 1968, Čáslavská won 19 individual gold medals in major international competitions. In this period she remained undefeated in the all-around in major international competition. She is the only female gymnast ever to win every Olympic, World Championships and European Championships all-around title from one Olympiad to the next one. She was at her peak at the 1964 Summer Olympics in Tokyo, winning the overall title and taking gold medals in the balance beam and the vault, in addition to another silver medal in the team event. At the 1966 World Championships, Čáslavská defended her vault title, winning a team gold – breaking the Soviet monopoly in that event – and became all-around world champion. Čáslavská dominated the 1965 and 1967 European Championships, taking all five individual titles and scoring two perfect scores of 10 in 1967. She is the only gymnast who has swept all five European individual golds twice.

Prior to the 1968 Summer Olympics in Mexico City, Čáslavská lost her training facility due to the Soviet-led invasion of Czechoslovakia. Instead, she used potato sacks as weights and logs as beams whilst training in the forests of Hrubý Jeseník mountains in northern Moravia. She was again dominant at the 1968 Summer Olympics, winning medals in all six events. She defended her all-around title and won additional gold medals on the floor, uneven bars and vault, as well as two silvers, for the team competition and balance beam. She won the 1968 Olympic all-around title with the highest recorded score up to that time. Her win by 1.4 points has remained the largest margin of victory in Olympics, World, World Cup, or European Championships for women in an all-around competition for 48 years. It was finally surpassed in 2016, ten years after a major rule change (the 2006 implementation of open ended scoring). As of the 2024 Olympic Games in Paris, she and Larisa Latynina are the only gymnasts to win the gold medal in individual all-around in consecutive Olympic games. She is also one of only two female gymnasts to defend gold medal in the vault apparatus. Her use of the "Jarabe tapatío" as the music for her floor routine and her subsequent marriage in the city made her immensely popular with the Mexican crowd.

=== Protest at the 1968 Olympics ===
Čáslavská's wins at the 1968 Olympics were particularly poignant because of the political turmoil in Czechoslovakia. She had publicly voiced her strong opposition to Soviet-style Communism and the Soviet invasion, and had signed Ludvik Vaculík's protest manifesto "Two Thousand Words" in the spring of 1968. Consequently, to avoid being arrested, she left the training facility in the town of Šumperk with the help of Zdeněk Zerzáň, chief of Jeseníky Mountain Rescue Service. She spent the weeks leading up to the Olympics hiding in a remote mountain hut at Vřesová studánka, and was only granted permission to travel to Mexico City at the last minute.

At the Olympics, where she once again faced Soviet opposition, Čáslavská continued to subtly voice her views. After she appeared to have won the gold medal on floor outright, the judging panel curiously upgraded the preliminary scores of Soviet Larisa Petrik, and declared a tie for the gold instead. All of this occurred on the heels of another very controversial judging decision that cost Čáslavská the gold on beam, instead awarding the title to her Soviet rival Natalia Kuchinskaya. Clearly disheartened and angered by the politics that favored the USSR, she protested during both medal ceremonies by quietly turning her head down and away during the playing of the Soviet national anthem.

== Later career ==
Čáslavská was revered by Czech people for her brave demonstration on the world's biggest stage, and she was awarded Czechoslovakia's Sportsperson of the Year award in 1968 (for the fourth and final time). Her federation, however, was none too pleased. For her consistent support of the Czechoslovak democratization movement (the Prague Spring) in 1968, and during the purges which followed the Soviet-led invasion in August 1968, she was deprived of the right to travel abroad and participate in public sport events both in Czechoslovakia and abroad. Čáslavská was effectively forced into retirement, and was considered a persona non grata for many years in her home country.

Czechoslovak authorities refused to publish her autobiography, and insisted that it be heavily censored when it was released in Japan. She was granted leave to work as a coach in Mexico, but reportedly only when the Mexican government threatened to cease oil exports to Czechoslovakia. After returning from Mexico in the beginning of 1980s, she shared an office with Emil Zátopek where the two former sport stars and present-day outcasts were given meaningless administrative roles. In the late 1980s, following pressure from Juan Antonio Samaranch, the then president of the International Olympic Committee, who had presented her with the Olympic Order, Čáslavská was finally allowed to work as a gymnastics coach and judge in her home country.

After the Velvet Revolution in November 1989 brought an end to communist government in Czechoslovakia, Čáslavská's status improved dramatically. She became President Havel's adviser on sports and social matters and Honorary President of the Czech-Japan Association. Later, after leaving the President's Office, she was elected President of the Czech Olympic Committee. In 1995, she was appointed to the IOC membership committee.

== Eponymous skill ==
Čáslavská has one eponymous skill listed in the Code of Points.

| Apparatus | Name | Description | Difficulty (Note: Valid for the 2025-2028 Code of Points) |
|---|---|---|---|
| Uneven bars | Čáslavská | From front support on high bar - swing backward with release and 1/1 turn (360°) to hang on high bar | C |

== Honours ==
Čáslavská received numerous accolades for her contributions to the sport of gymnastics. In addition to the Olympic Order, she was awarded a 1989 Pierre de Coubertin International Fair Play Trophy by UNESCO and was noted at the ceremony for her "exemplary dignity". In 1995, she was honored with the Czech Republic's Medal of Merit. She was inducted into the International Women's Sports Hall of Fame in 1991 and the International Gymnastics Hall of Fame in 1998. In 2010, she was awarded the Order of the Rising Sun, 3rd class. She was also presented a 17th-century katana and a ceremonial kimono from the Japanese emperor.

In 2014, she was the joint recipient (with AP journalist Iva Drapalova) of the Hanno R. Ellenbogen Citizenship Award, awarded annually by the Prague Society for International Cooperation and Global Panel Foundation, for outstanding civic courage.

An inner main belt asteroid (26986) Caslavska is named for her.

On 28 October 2026, Čáslavská was awarded the Order of the White Lion II. class in memoriam.

== Personal life and death ==
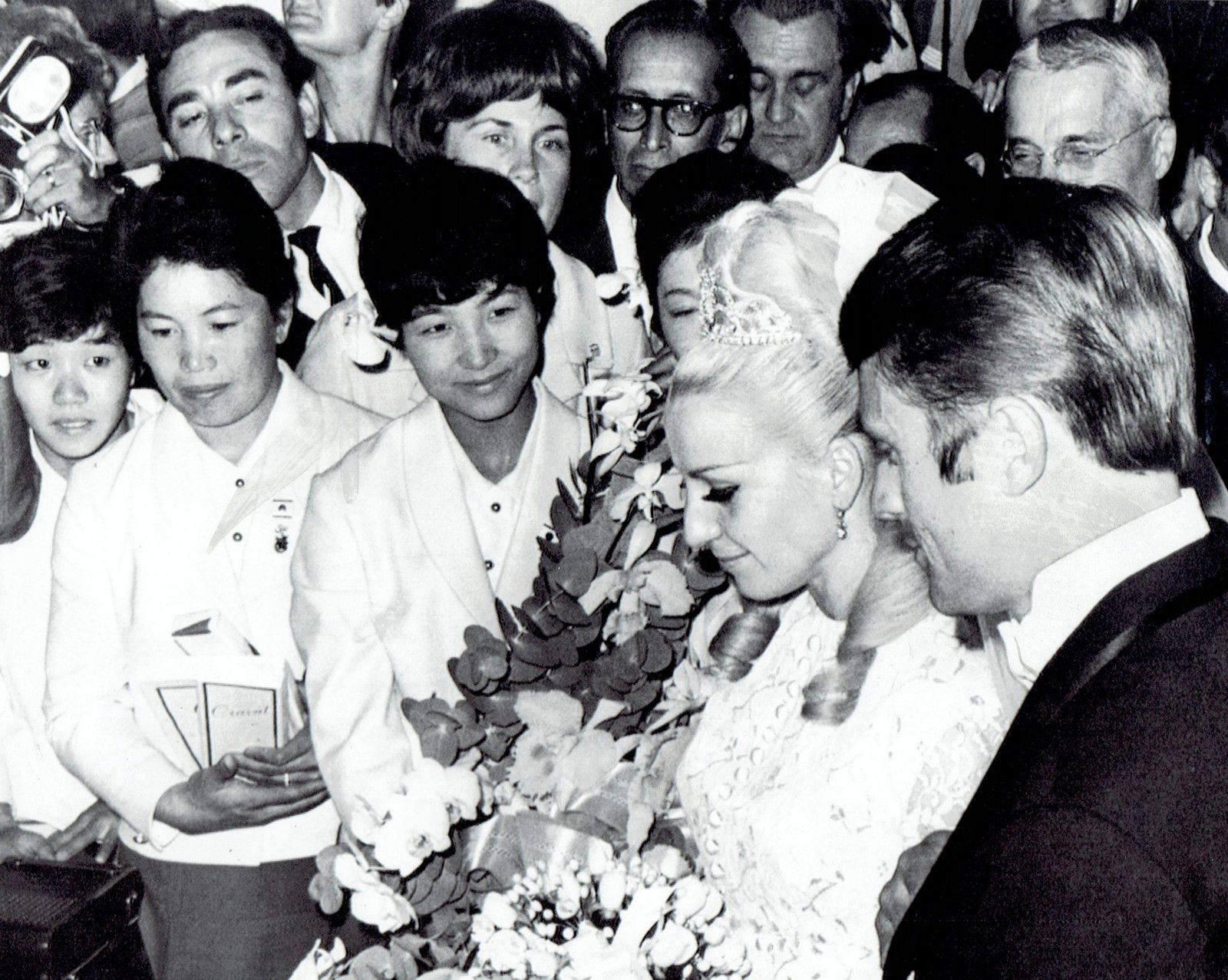
Čáslavská and Odložil getting married in Mexico City on 26 October 1968

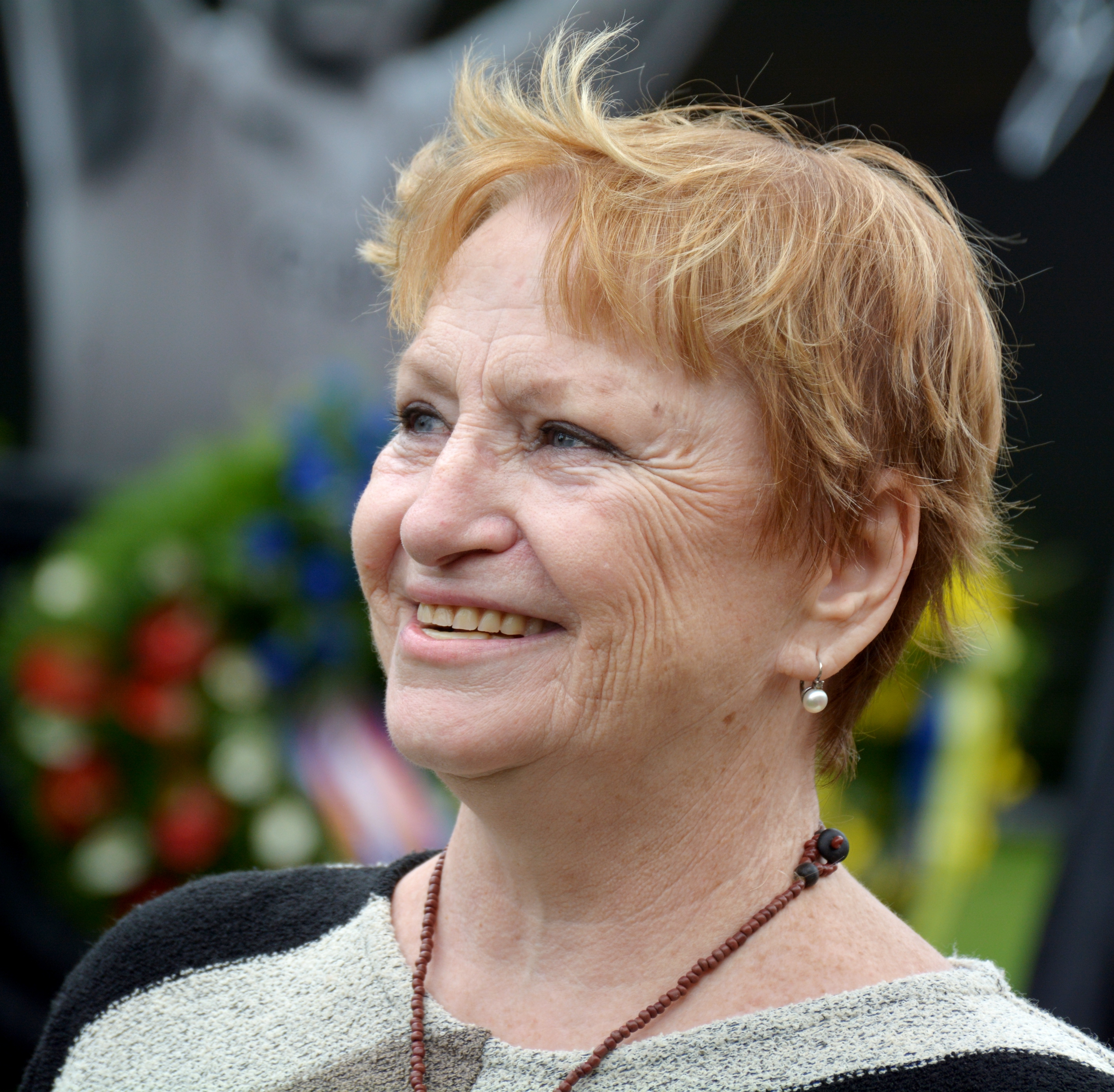
Čáslavská in 2015

Shortly before the end of the 1968 Olympics, Čáslavská married runner Josef Odložil, who had been a silver medalist at the 1964 Olympics in Tokyo. The ceremony, which took place at the Mexico City Cathedral, drew a crowd of thousands. They had a daughter, Radka, and a son, Martin. The couple divorced in 1987. In 1993, her son and ex-husband were involved in an altercation, with Martin allegedly punching Josef; he fell to the floor and struck his head, leading to his death after 35 days. Čáslavská became severely depressed and apathetic and was rarely seen in public afterwards.

For a while, she was treated at a psychiatric hospital where she even underwent electroshock treatment, before moved into nursing home. Čáslavská eventually overcame her depression (which she had been fighting for about 15 years), cancelled all medication and returned to both social and sports lives, coaching younger gymnasts. After many years of seclusion, when she was barely seen except by her closest friends and family, she had seemed to be regaining her appetite for life. She described her new-found energy as “miraculous” and had recovered enough joie de vivre to delight Mexican spectators, as a guest at a gymnastics event in Acapulco, by demonstrating spontaneously that at 70 she could still do the splits.

Čáslavská was diagnosed with pancreatic cancer in 2015. Her health deteriorated significantly in the summer of 2016, to such an extent that she was taken to a hospital in Prague on 30 August, where she died at the age of 74.

== Competition history ==
| Year | Event | Team | AA | VT | UB | BB | FX |
|---|---|---|---|---|---|---|---|
| 1957 | Junior Championships of the Republic | | 1st place, gold medalist(s) | | | | |
| 1958 | Czechoslovak Championships | | 2nd place, silver medalist(s) | | | | |
| 1958 | World Championships | 2nd place, silver medalist(s) | 8 | | | | |
| 1959 | Czechoslovak Championships | | 3rd place, bronze medalist(s) | 1st place, gold medalist(s) | 2nd place, silver medalist(s) | 2nd place, silver medalist(s) | 2nd place, silver medalist(s) |
| 1959 | European Championships | | 8 | 2nd place, silver medalist(s) | | | 1st place, gold medalist(s) |
| 1960 | Czechoslovak Championships | | 2nd place, silver medalist(s) | | | | |
| 1960 | Czechoslovak Spartakiade | | 1st place, gold medalist(s) | | | 1st place, gold medalist(s) | 1st place, gold medalist(s) |
| 1960 | Olympic Games | 2nd place, silver medalist(s) | 8 | | | 6 | |
| 1961 | Czechoslovak Championships | | 1st place, gold medalist(s) | 1st place, gold medalist(s) | 1st place, gold medalist(s) | | |
| 1961 | Czechoslovakia – East Germany Dual Meet | 1st place, gold medalist(s) | 4 | 2nd place, silver medalist(s) | | | 3rd place, bronze medalist(s) |
| 1961 | European Championships | | 3rd place, bronze medalist(s) | 6 | 5 | 6 | 3rd place, bronze medalist(s) |
| 1962 | Czechoslovak Championships | | 1st place, gold medalist(s) | 1st place, gold medalist(s) | 1st place, gold medalist(s) | 1st place, gold medalist(s) | 1st place, gold medalist(s) |
| 1962 | Czechoslovakia – East Germany – Ukraine (Soviet Union) Tri-Meet | 1st place, gold medalist(s) | 1st place, gold medalist(s) | | | | |
| 1962 | Tbilisi International | | 1st place, gold medalist(s) | | | | |
| 1962 | World Championships | 2nd place, silver medalist(s) | 2nd place, silver medalist(s) | 1st place, gold medalist(s) | 5 | 5 | 3rd place, bronze medalist(s) |
| 1963 | Japan – Czechoslovakia Dual Meet | 1st place, gold medalist(s) | 1st place, gold medalist(s) | | | | |
| 1964 | Czechoslovak Championships | | 1st place, gold medalist(s) | 1st place, gold medalist(s) | 1st place, gold medalist(s) | 1st place, gold medalist(s) | 1st place, gold medalist(s) |
| 1964 | Czechoslovakia – East Germany Dual Meet | 1st place, gold medalist(s) | 1st place, gold medalist(s) | | | | |
| 1964 | Olympic Games | 2nd place, silver medalist(s) | 1st place, gold medalist(s) | 1st place, gold medalist(s) | 5 | 1st place, gold medalist(s) | 6 |
| 1964 | United States – Czechoslovakia Dual Meet | 1st place, gold medalist(s) | 1st place, gold medalist(s) | | | | |
| 1965 | Czechoslovak Spartakiade | | 1st place, gold medalist(s) | 1st place, gold medalist(s) | 1st place, gold medalist(s) | 1st place, gold medalist(s) | 1st place, gold medalist(s) |
| 1965 | European Championships | | 1st place, gold medalist(s) | 1st place, gold medalist(s) | 1st place, gold medalist(s) | 1st place, gold medalist(s) | 1st place, gold medalist(s) |
| 1966 | Czechoslovak Championships | | 1st place, gold medalist(s) | | | | |
| 1966 | Hungary – Czechoslovakia – Britain Tri-Meet | | 1st place, gold medalist(s) | 1st place, gold medalist(s) | 1st place, gold medalist(s) | 1st place, gold medalist(s) | 1st place, gold medalist(s) |
| 1966 | Germany – Czechoslovakia Dual Meet | 1st place, gold medalist(s) | 1st place, gold medalist(s) | | | | |
| 1966 | World Championships | 1st place, gold medalist(s) | 1st place, gold medalist(s) | 1st place, gold medalist(s) | 4 | 2nd place, silver medalist(s) | 2nd place, silver medalist(s) |
| 1967 | Czechoslovak Championships | | 1st place, gold medalist(s) | 1st place, gold medalist(s) | 1st place, gold medalist(s) | 1st place, gold medalist(s) | 1st place, gold medalist(s) |
| 1967 | European Championships | | 1st place, gold medalist(s) | 1st place, gold medalist(s) | 1st place, gold medalist(s) | 1st place, gold medalist(s) | 1st place, gold medalist(s) |
| 1968 | Czechoslovak Championships | | 1st place, gold medalist(s) | 1st place, gold medalist(s) | 1st place, gold medalist(s) | 1st place, gold medalist(s) | 1st place, gold medalist(s) |
| 1968 | Olympic Games | 2nd place, silver medalist(s) | 1st place, gold medalist(s) | 1st place, gold medalist(s) | 1st place, gold medalist(s) | 2nd place, silver medalist(s) | 1st place, gold medalist(s) |

== See also ==
- List of top Olympic gymnastics medalists
- List of top medalists at the World Artistic Gymnastics Championships

Sporting positions
| Preceded by Jindřich Poledník | President of the Czech Olympic Committee; 1990–1996 | Succeeded by Milan Jirásek |
