= Ingrid Föst =

German gymnast

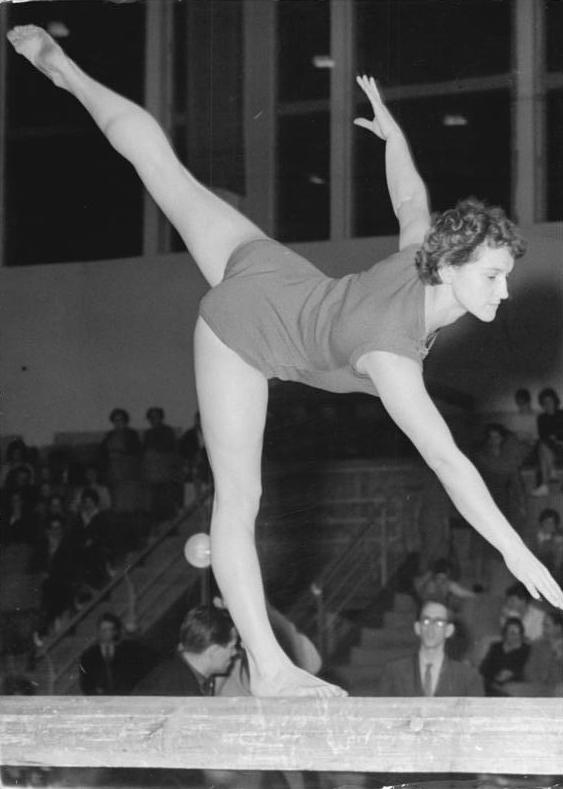
- Ingrid Föst in 1960

Personal information
- Born: 9 November 1934 (age 91) Nowawes, Potsdam-Babelsberg, Germany
- Height: 1.60 m (5 ft 3 in)
- Weight: 50 kg (110 lb)

Sport
- Sport: Artistic gymnastics
- Club: Sportclub Einheit Nordost; ZSKA Vorwärts Berlin; SC Dynamo Berlin
Medal record
Representing East Germany
European Championships
Silver medal – second place	1961 Leipzig	Vault
Bronze medal – third place	1959 Kraków	Vault
Bronze medal – third place	1959 Kraków	Uneven Bars
Bronze medal – third place	1961 Leipzig	All-Around
Bronze medal – third place	1961 Leipzig	Uneven Bars
Bronze medal – third place	1961 Leipzig	Balance Beam

Ingrid Föst (née Michaelis; born 9 November 1934) is a retired German gymnast. She competed at the 1960 and 1964 Summer Olympics in all artistic gymnastics events and finished in sixth and fourth place with the United Team of Germany, respectively. Individually her best achievement was fifth place on the floor in 1964. She won one silver and five bronze medals at the European championships of 1959 and 1961.
