= European Women's Artistic Gymnastics Championships =

The European Women's Gymnastics Championships are an artistic gymnastics championships for female gymnasts from European countries organised by European Gymnastics. They are held annually, though rotate between two different formats.

== History ==
Originally held biannually in odd-numbered years, the championships moved to even-numbered years in 1990. In 2005 a second set of championships was introduced, titled the "individual championships". Although numbered as a separate event, winners in either event are considered European champions, and the championships as a result have in effect become an annual event, but in two formats: in even-numbered years, a stand-alone women's event incorporates the European Junior Artistic Gymnastics championships (an entirely separate men's competition is held in the same years, although occasionally at the same venue), while in odd-numbered years, the separately numbered 'individual championships' are held in conjunction with the men's competition of the same description, but without juniors, as a single event.

As a result, there is no individual all-around title awarded in even-numbered years (except for juniors), and similarly no team all-around title awarded in odd-numbered years. Otherwise the apparatus and titles are identical. In effect, the juniors championships remain biannual.

In 2022, as part of the multisport 2022 European Championships in Munich, an individual all-around title was introduced in an unusual format, combined with both team and apparatus qualification. In 2023 an equivalent modification was made so that the qualification process for the individual and all-around finals doubled as a team final. In so far as even numbered years still have a separate team final, and odd numbered years a separate individual final, the distinction in formats remains, but all titled are now awarded annually.

A further event, the European Games also holds a full set of championships for European artistic gymnasts in the year preceding the Summer Olympic Games, having begun in 2015. These, however, are organized by the European Olympic Committees and are not recognized as part of the continuity of the European Championships. Gymnastics was dropped from the 2023 European Games. (Note: winners are therefore described as European Games champions, not European Champions.)

== Championships ==
2018 and 2022 were part of the European Championships (Multi-Sport). Juniors from 1978 to 1992 were held in another country and from 1994 was held along with seniors.

=== Juniors ===
The 1990 and 1992 editions were team-only championships designated as European Junior Team Gymnastics Championships, whereas all other editions featured all-around and event finals.

Number	Year	Host City	Host Country	Events
1	1978	Milan	Italy	5
2	1980	Lyon	France	5
3	1982	Ankara	Turkey	5
4	1984	Rimini	Italy	5
5	1986	Karlsruhe	West Germany	5
6	1988	Avignon	France	5
7	1990	Barcelona	Spain	1
8	1991	Athens	Greece	5
9	1992	Arezzo	Italy	1
10	1993	Gent	Belgium	5

=== Women's European Artistic Gymnastics Championships ===
The following tables include all editions of the stand-alone women's championships (column 1 and 2) as well as, for completeness, a table of the separate European Men's and Women's individual Championships which also crown women's champions in all events.

Number (S/J)	Year	Host City	Host Country	Events (S+J)
1	1957	Bucharest	Romania	5
2	1959	Kraków	Poland	5
3	1961	Leipzig	East Germany	5
4	1963	Paris	France	5
5	1965	Sofia	Bulgaria	5
6	1967	Amsterdam	Netherlands	5
7	1969	Landskrona	Sweden	5
8	1971	Minsk	Soviet Union	5
9	1973	London	United Kingdom	5
10	1975	Skien	Norway	5
11	1977	Prague	Czechoslovakia	5
12	1979	Copenhagen	Denmark	5
13	1981	Madrid	Spain	5
14	1983	Gothenburg	Sweden	5
15	1985	Helsinki	Finland	5
16	1987	Moscow	Soviet Union	5
17	1989	Brussels	Belgium	5
18	1990	Piraeus	Greece	5
19	1992	Nantes	France	5
20/11	1994	Stockholm	Sweden	6+5
21/12	1996	Birmingham	United Kingdom	6+6
22/13	1998	Saint Petersburg	Russia	6+6
23/14	2000	Paris	France	6+6
24/15	2002	Patras	Greece	6+6
25/16	2004	Amsterdam	Netherlands	6+6

Number (S/J)	Year	Host City	Host Country	Events (S+J)
26/17	2006	Volos	Greece	5+6
27/18	2008	Clermont-Ferrand	France	5+5
28/19	2010	Birmingham	United Kingdom	5+6
29/20	2012	Brussels	Belgium	5+6
30/21	2014	Sofia	Bulgaria	5+6
31/22	2016	Bern	Switzerland	5+6
32/23	2018	Glasgow	United Kingdom	5+6
33/24	2020	Mersin	Turkey	5+6
34/25	2022	Munich	Germany	6+6
35/26	2024	Rimini	Italy	6+6
36/27	2026	Zagreb	Croatia	6+6
37/28	2028	Athens	Greece	6+6

== Medal table ==
=== Seniors ===
As of 2026.

Rank	Nation	Gold	Silver	Bronze	Total
1	Romania	56	58	48	162
2	Soviet Union	56	35	25	116
3	Russia	44	35	32	111
4	Italy	17	16	13	46
5	Great Britain	15	21	10	46
6	Ukraine	12	11	21	44
7	France	12	8	16	36
8	East Germany	11	17	20	48
9	Czechoslovakia	11	2	10	23
10	Switzerland	7	1	5	13
11	Hungary	6	4	6	16
12	Germany	5	6	6	17
13	Belgium	4	1	5	10
14	Netherlands	3	10	7	20
15	Sweden	2	4	2	8
16	Yugoslavia	2	2	2	6
17	Poland	2	0	2	4
18	Belarus	1	2	1	4
19	Bulgaria	0	5	5	10
20	Spain	0	4	6	10
21	Azerbaijan	0	1	0	1
21	Czech Republic	0	1	0	1
21	Turkey	0	1	0	1
24	West Germany	0	0	2	2
25	Greece	0	0	1	1
25	Israel	0	0	1	1
25	Slovakia	0	0	1	1
Totals (27 entries)		266	245	247	758

== See also ==
- European Artistic Gymnastics Championships – Women's individual all-around
- European Men's and Women's Artistic Gymnastics Individual Championships
- European Men's Artistic Gymnastics Championships
- World Artistic Gymnastics Championships

== Results ==
- "European Artistic Gymnastics Championships". GymnasticsResults.com. Archived from the original on 2009-12-13.
- "European Championships". Gymn-Forum.net.
