= Wilfried Stallknecht =

German architect, designer, and planner (1928–2019)

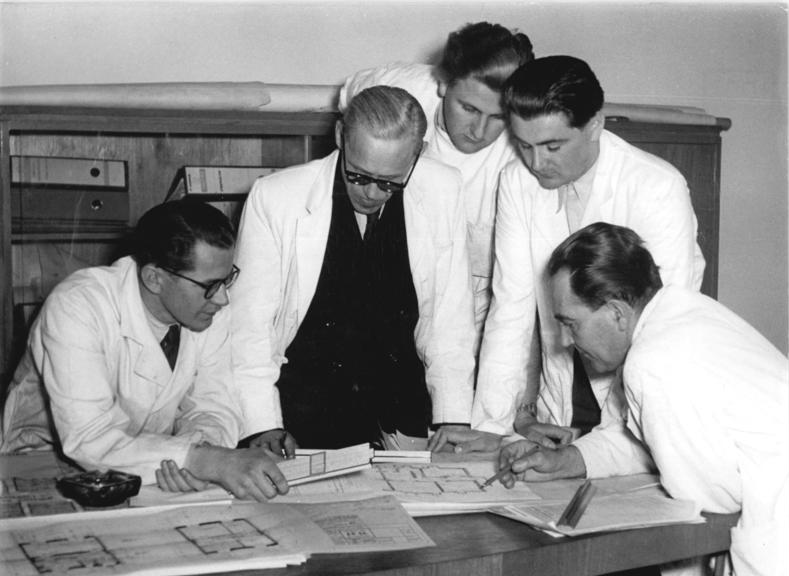
Stallknecht (second from right) in 1954 at work on single-family house designs

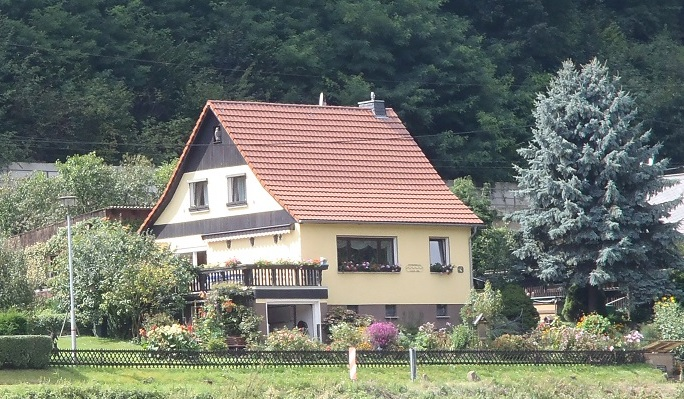
EW58 single-family house in Saxony with typical customizations such as the terrace.

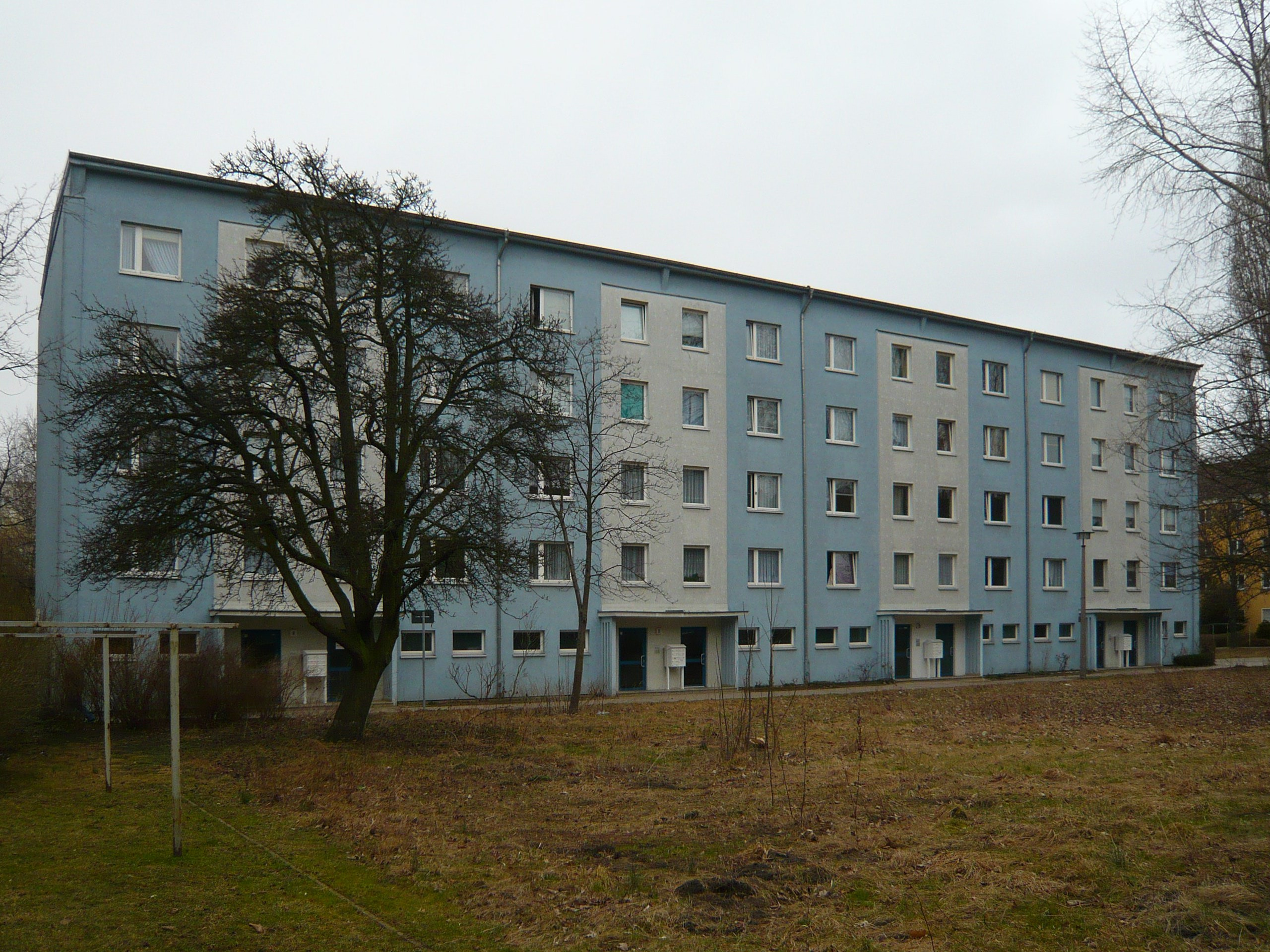
P2 Plattenbau prototype in Fennpfuhl, Berlin

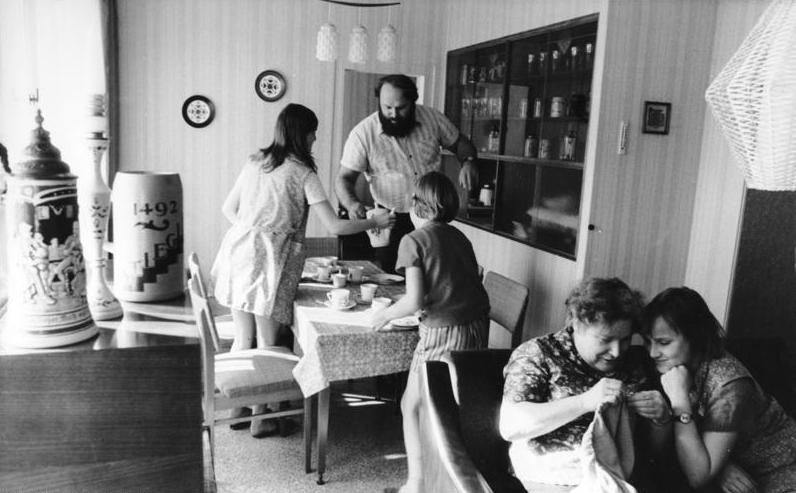
Kitchen pass-through in a P2 Plattenbau

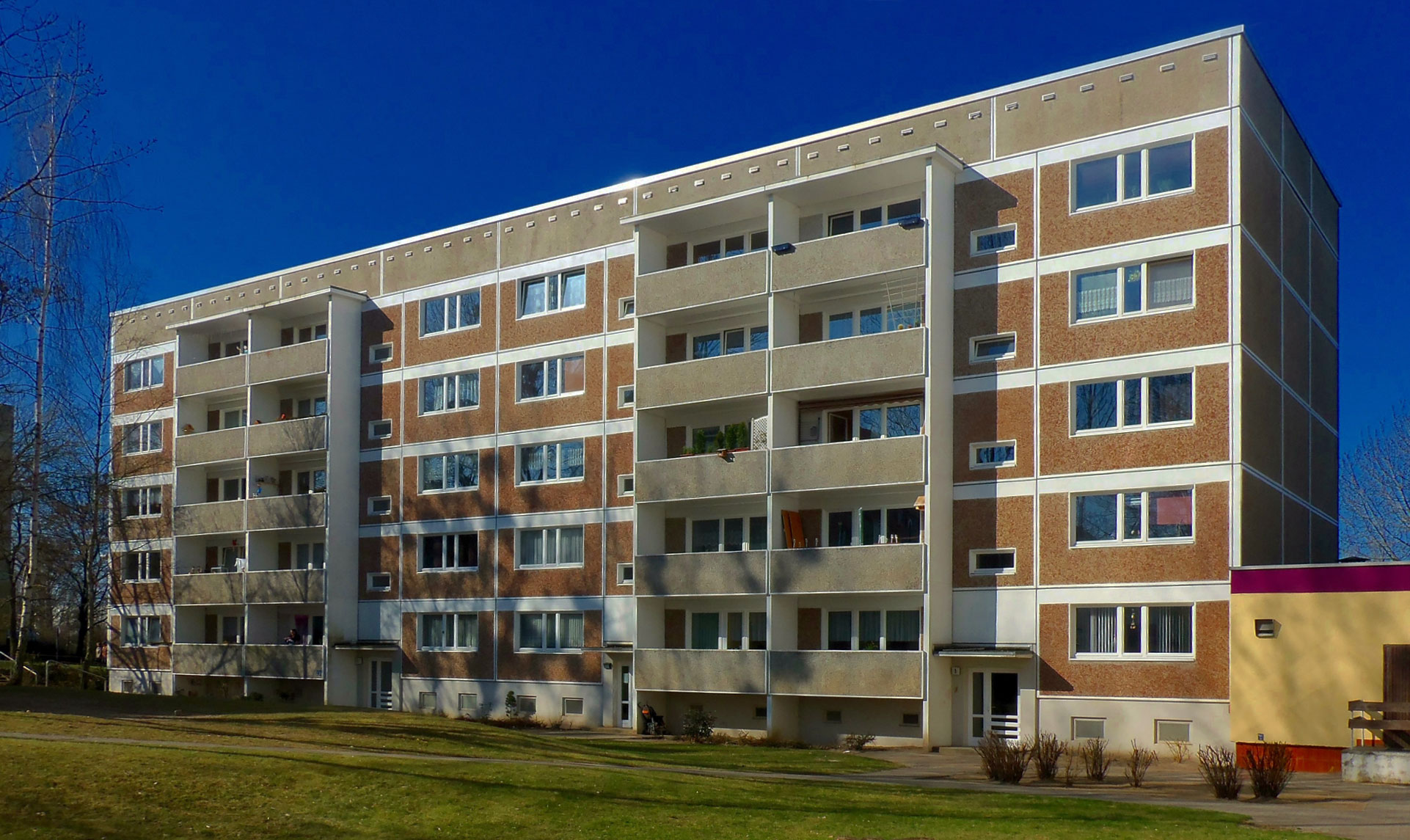
The first WBS 70 apartment building, in Neubrandenburg

Wilfried Stallknecht (12 August 1928 – 22 December 2019) was a German architect, planner and furniture designer. He was known chiefly for his significant role in shaping Germany's post-World War II built environment – particularly that of the former East Germany (GDR) – through his major contributions to the designs of the country's ubiquitous, iconic and often standardized housing blocks – the so-called Plattenbau – as well as a similarly ubiquitous and standardized single-family house design known as the EW58. He was affiliated with the GDR's Bauakademie from 1959 to 1973 and served as planner for the town of Bernau bei Berlin from 1974 to 1984.

== Life and works ==
Stallknecht was born in Geringswalde, Germany in August 1928. In 1932, Stallknecht's father bought a vacant factory in Geringswalde in which he began producing clocks and tables. His mother was an accountant. At the factory he entered a carpentry apprenticeship which was interrupted in 1944 upon his conscription into an anti-aircraft auxiliary. After the war, the family factory was expropriated, becoming a state-owned enterprise, the Geringswalde Table Factory, and there the son completed his apprenticeship. After a compulsory work detail in 1949 at a uranium ore mine of the Soviet-German Bismuth Corporation (SDAG Wismut), Stallknecht entered the Fachschule für angewandte Kunst in Erfurt (College of Applied Art) where he studied interior design and obtained a cabinetmaking diploma, graduating in 1951 The following year he joined the Project Planning Berlin state-owned enterprise and participated in the design of interiors for prestigious East German buildings such as the Wilhelm Pieck High School at the Bogensee. Joining the newly founded Design Institute (Institut für Entwurf, later Zentralinstitut für Typung) a year later, he witnessed the genesis of the GDR's standardized housing structures, which would go on to be a major influence on his career. Around this time he became interested in architecture proper and in 1954 designed a standardized series of private homes which he later described as "a blow to increasing standardization", as a number of different houses could be built based on it. They were not mass-produced, however, due to the diversity of floor plans and window sizes.

A commission for a series of houses resulted in the design known as the EW58, which went on to become widely popular, with about 500,000 being built in the GDR beginning in 1958. The house was relatively affordable, often constructed by the owners with the help of neighbors, and has an important role in the material form of the country's postwar peri-urban and rural life. The EW58's simple design was frequently modified by its owners in an ad-hoc fashion with individualized elements such as enlargements, finished basements, and balconies. By 1959 Stallknecht was a researcher for the architect Hermann Henselmann at the Bauakademie, focusing on "industrial" building for providing rapid access to new housing for large numbers of people.

Together with the architects Achim Felz and Herbert Kuschy he developed the "P2" panel building system. The standardized apartment blocks based on this design provided clean new housing on an unprecedented scale for millions whose homes had been damaged or destroyed in the war. For the first prototype building, in Berlin's Fennpfuhl district, he designed an open pass-through between kitchen and living-dining area, an influential innovation that came to be a defining feature of countless apartments of the era. The prototype building has been under historic preservation protection since the 1980s. His involvement with the P2 continued through the course of his affiliations with a number of institutes at the Bauakademie.

It was Stallknecht's idea to add curves to the P2 type, first realized at Berlin's Lenin Square (now United Nations Plaza) in a housing development commonly referred to as the Wohnschlange (housing-snake). Later he and Felz developed a P3 type, and the Plattenbau 69 study from around the same time later became the basis for the widely built WBS 70 building series.

At the Berlin-Weißensee Art College he undertook postgraduate studies, writing a thesis, "Residential Building Requirements of Advanced Socialist Society in the GDR", and in 1978 completing a doctoral dissertation, "Plattenbau Construction Concepts for the Transformation of Inner-City Residential Areas". In addition to lecturing at the Hochschule für Architektur und Bauwesen Weimar he completed his habilitation with the dissertation "Flexible Space in Industrial Housing in the GDR".

In 1974 Stallknecht became director of planning for the town of Bernau, ten kilometers north of Berlin. His projects included the Cafe am Pulverturm, the Steintor tavern, and most notably, prefabricated handicapped-accessible housing.

Stallknecht's carpentry training served as preparation for his work on interiors and furnishings design, such as his 1968 design for the "Selio" convertible armchair-ottoman-daybed, although as of 2013 it had not found a manufacturer. Stallknecht remained active after the 1990 German unification, participating in symposia, serving as consultant for the town of Bernau, and planning and building a passive-solar house. He submitted more than 20 patents – as late as 2013 – including one for a "slide-tipping" construction method (Gleit-Kipp-Verfahren) for erecting residential buildings in a horizontal position and then raising them upright. Similar methods can be applied to chimney construction, resulting in economies and cost savings. In 2013, it was noted that Stallknecht worked on retrofitting solar cells to balconies and facade elements for a public housing society in Dresden. Small wind turbines for housing complex roofs were also under consideration.

Stallknecht lived with his family in the Fennpfuhl district of Berlin in a prefabricated housing complex. He died in December 2019 at the age of 91.

== Bibliography ==
- Engler, Harald (2014). Wilfried Stallknecht und das industrielle Bauen: Ein Architektenleben in der DDR. Berlin: Lukas Verlag. ISBN 978-3-86732-174-7
- Entwerfen im System. Der Architekt Wilfried Stallknecht. Ausstellungskatalog, 2009 (Online; PDF; 57,1 MB)
- Wagner, Volker (2010). Stallknecht, Wilfried. In: Wer war wer in der DDR? 5. Ausgabe. Band 2 Berlin: Ch. Links Verlag. ISBN 978-3-86153-561-4.
