= Q3A =

Q3A may refer to:

- Quake III Arena, a first-person shooter video game developed by id Software
- Q3A Panel house, a type of German panel house
