= DDR Museum =

Berlin museum about life in East Germany

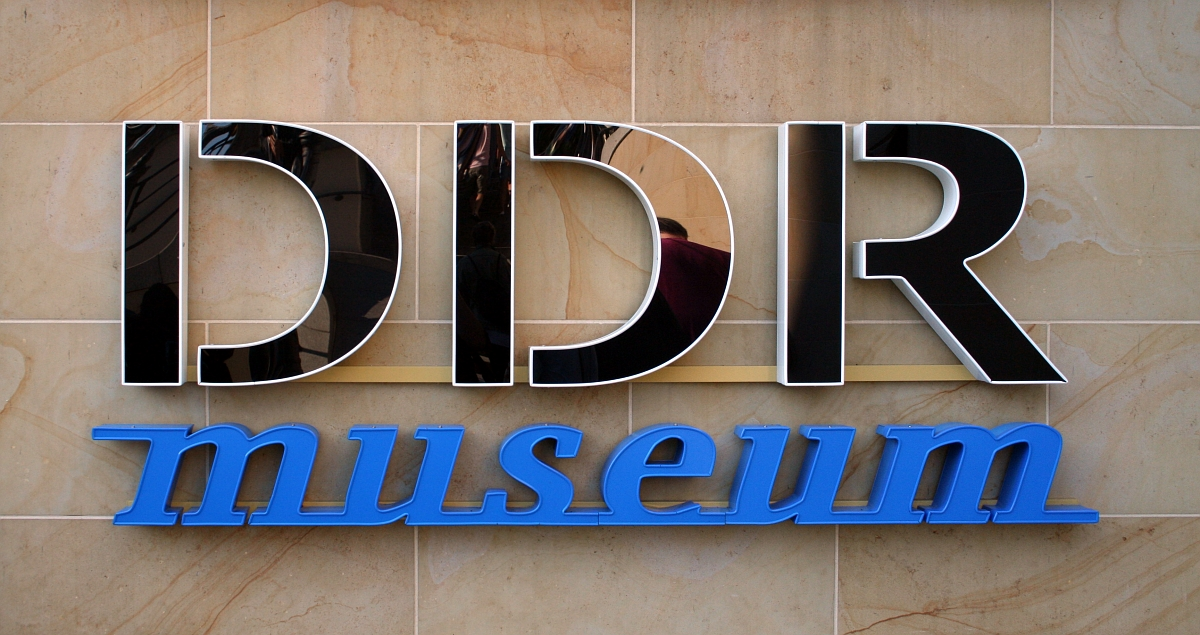

- Location within Central Berlin Location within Germany
- Location: Germany, Berlin
- Coordinates: 52°31′8.5″N 13°24′8″E

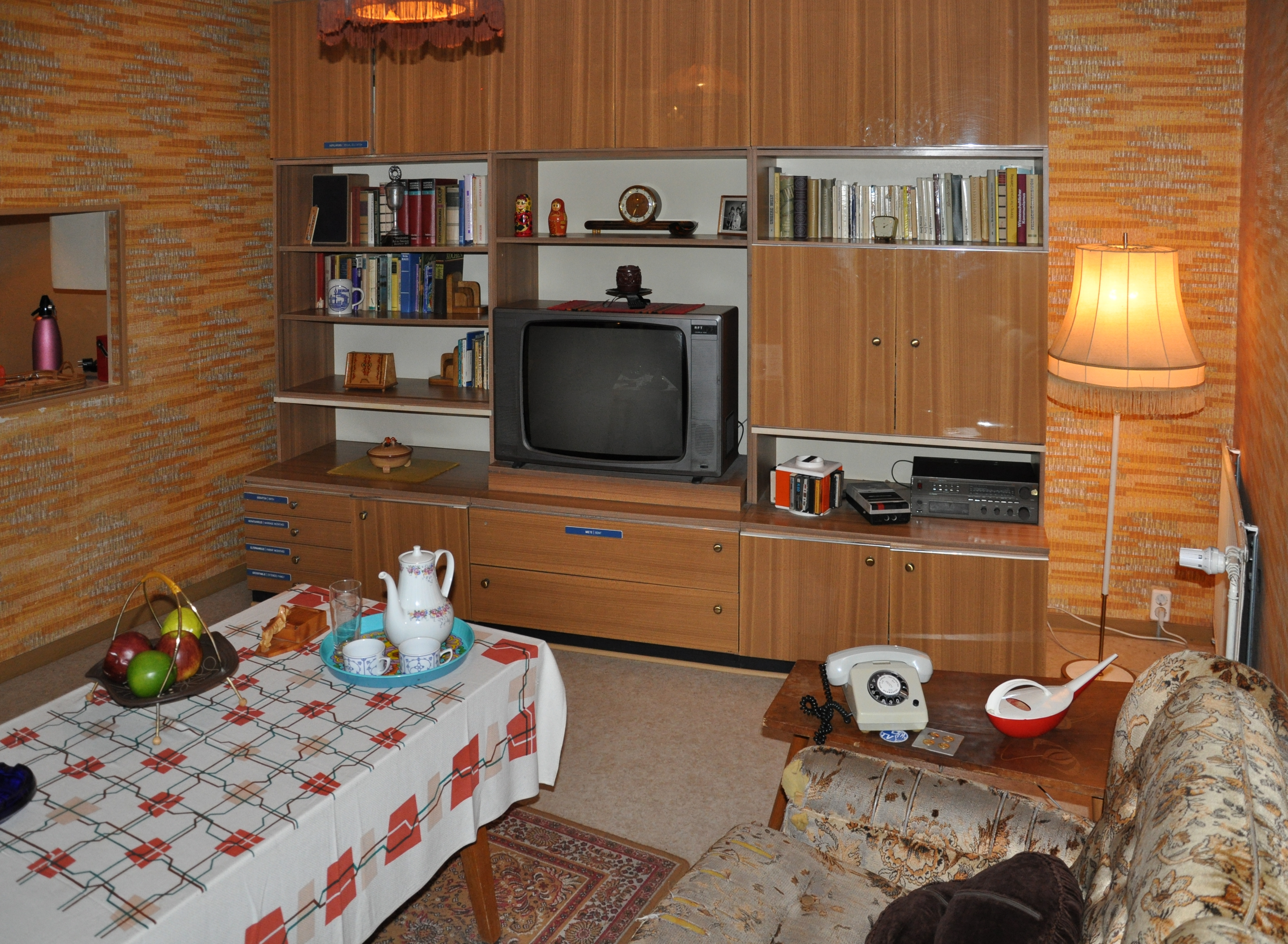
Living room in the DDR

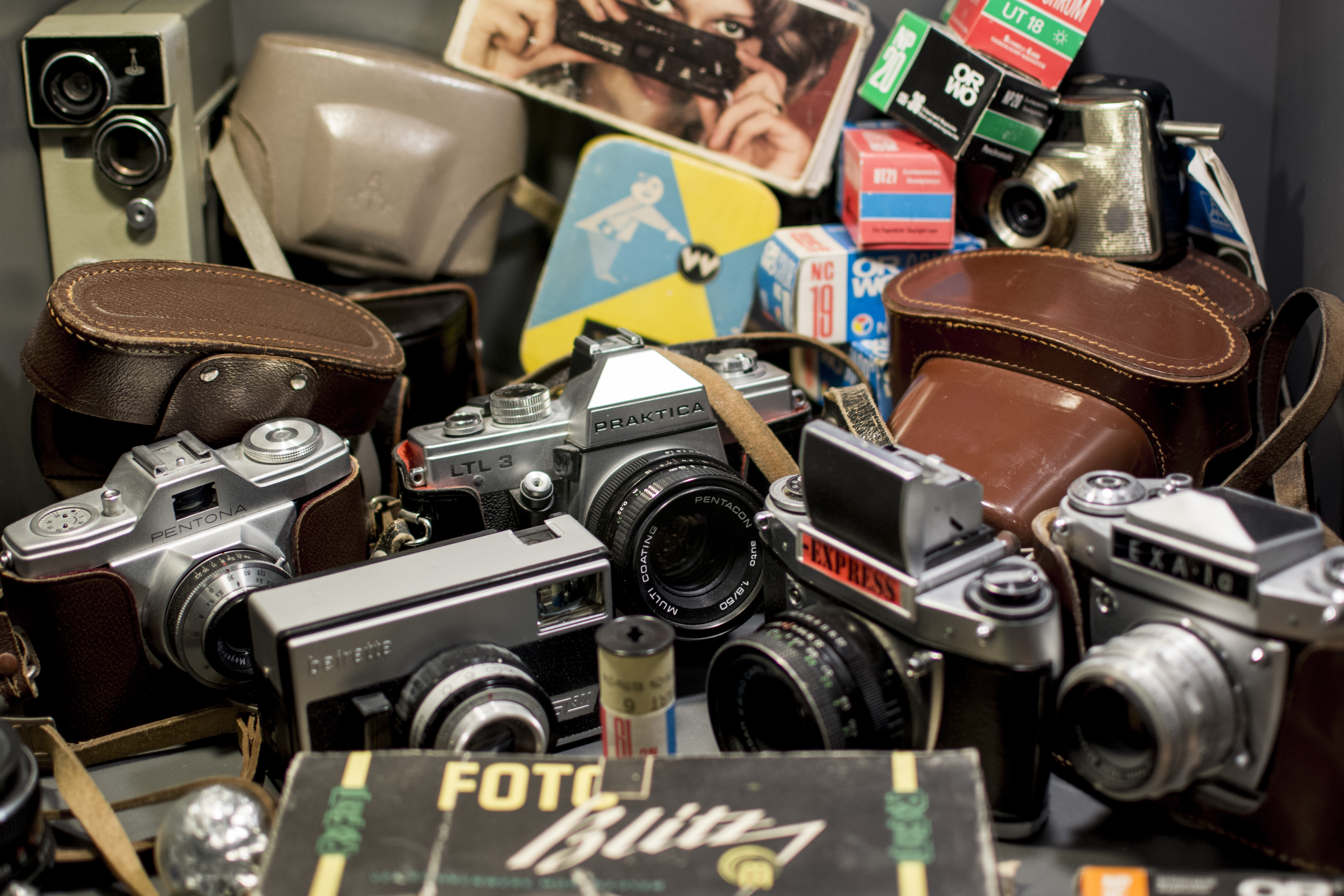
Photographic films and cameras made in East Germany (GDR)

The DDR Museum is a museum in the centre of Berlin. The museum is located in the former governmental district of East Germany, right on the river Spree, opposite the Berlin Cathedral. The museum is the 11th most visited museum in Berlin.

Its exhibition depicts life in the former East Germany (known in German as the Deutsche Demokratische Republik or DDR) in a direct "hands-on" way. For example, a covert listening device ("bug") gives visitors the sense of being "under surveillance". One can also try DDR clothes on in the recreated tower block apartment, change TV channels or use an original typewriter. The exhibition consists of thematic blocks, including education, work life, holidays, shopping, sports, economy, environment, the Stasi and its surveillance methods as well as ideology, to name just a few. Each of them is presented under a critical light: the positives as well as the negative sides of the DDR are explored in this exhibition.

The museum was opened on 15 July 2006, as a private museum. Private funding is unusual in Germany, because German museums are normally funded by the state. The museum met some opposition from state-owned museums, who considered possibly "suspect" a private museum and were concerned that the museum could be used as an argument to question the public funding of museums in general.

In 2008, the DDR Museum was nominated for the European Museum of the Year Award.

== Exhibition highlights ==
- Recreated WBS 70 tower block flat with five rooms
- Cinema
- Prison cell
- Surveillance room
- Interrogation room
- Nursery

== Special exhibits ==
- A Trabant car with a driving simulation
- A motion-ride "elevator"
- A Volvo limousine 264 TE (from the ministerial car pool)
- "Praise of Communism", a mural by Ronald Paris
- Records of food shortages, school books
- A 1 megabit chip
- A printing press from the Umweltbibliothek

In general, the exhibition does not focus on every single individual exhibit, but rather on the overall atmosphere, emotions and reflections conveyed. According to the DDR Museum, the collection contains more than 250,000 objects. A database of these objects is available on the museum's website.

== Design of the exhibition ==
The visitor is entering the first part of the exhibition via an entrance platform. He will discover an estate of prefabricated buildings on a scale of 1:20. The prefabricated buildings are both room dividers and showcase cabinets at the same time. In the second part of the exhibition visitors experience the “semicircle of power” where it's clear to see: The Party is the center of everything. This center is surrounded by a semicircle of different topics such as “Politics” and “Political System”. The visitor can open doors, hatches and drawers and will gain detailed insights behind the facade of the socialist dictatorship. In the third part of the permanent exhibition, a completely furnished Plattenbau apartment shows the private life in the GDR. A children's room, a bedroom, a living room, a kitchen, a bathroom, a Stasi control room as well as a garage can be explored and experienced freely.

== History of the museum ==
The DDR Museum project was brought to life by the ethnologist Peter Kenzelmann from Freiburg. According to the media, he had searched for a museum about the DDR on a trip to Berlin, but had found none. He therefore decided to fill the gap and so the museum opened on 15 July 2006. The director of the museum is Gordon Freiherr von Godin, who came into position in 2016, and until the end of 2024 the academic director was Dr. Stefan Wolle.

The museum celebrated its first anniversary on 14 July 2007 and announced that it had welcomed 180,000 visitors during that first year. The DDR Museum was nominated for the European Museum of the Year Award in 2008 and 2012. The German National Tourist Board (DZT) conducted a survey and the DDR Museum came 44th in the ranking of Germany's top 100 attractions in 2015 and 36th in 2016. The museum welcomed its 500,000th visitor on 26 August 2008 and its millionth visitor on 23 December 2009. The second part of the permanent exhibition opened on 10 October 2010, which introduced new themes, objects and interactive platforms. By 14 September 2015, the museum had welcomed 4,000,000 visitors.

The DDR Museum celebrated its tenth anniversary on 14 July 2016. The third part of the permanent exhibition opened in August 2016, which consists of a recreated WBS-70 tower block flat. Here as well, visitors have the opportunity to interact and try out the many installations.

== See also ==
- "Everyday life in the GDR" exhibit at the Museum in the Kulturbrauerei
- Ostalgie
- Culture of East Germany
