= Wolfgang Blochwitz =

German footballer (1941–2005)

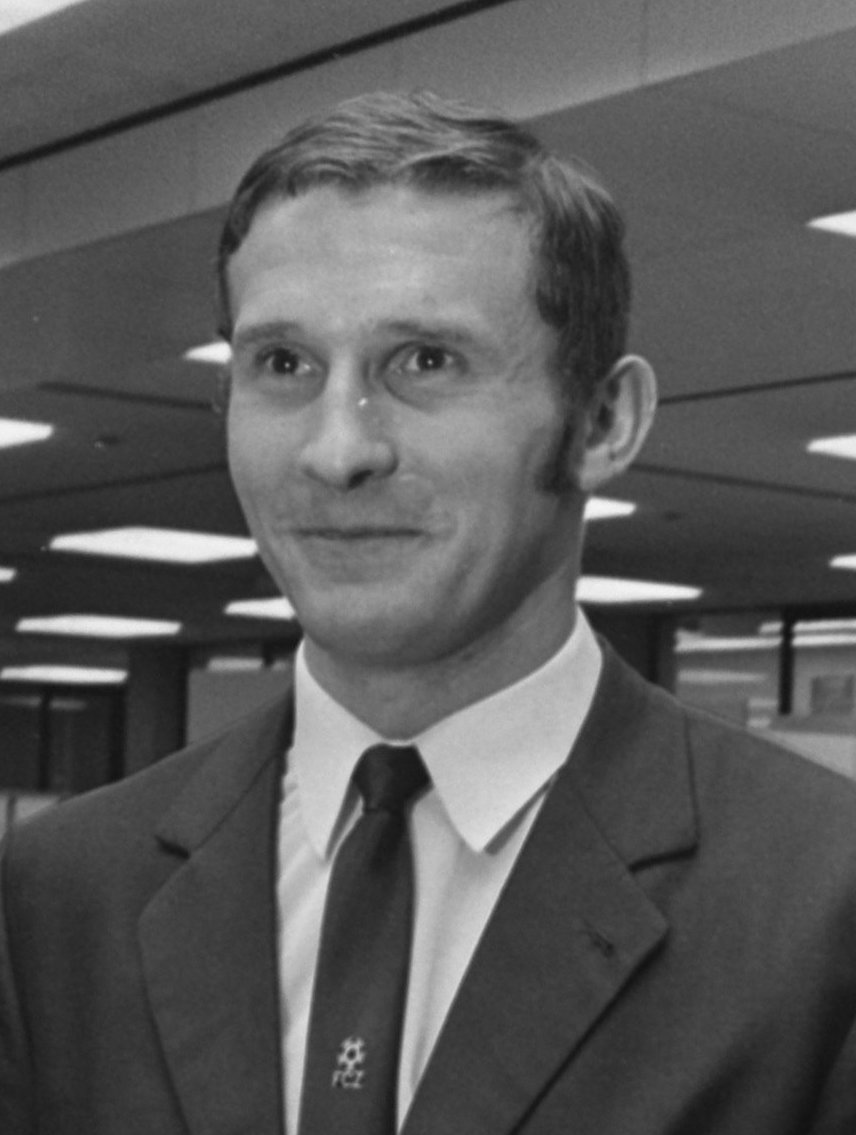
- Blochwitz in 1970

Personal information
- Full name: Wolfgang Blochwitz
- Date of birth: 8 February 1941
- Place of birth: Geringswalde, Germany
- Date of death: 8 May 2005 (aged 64)
- Place of death: Bad Berka, Germany
- Height: 1.82 m (6 ft 0 in)
- Position: Goalkeeper

Senior career*
Years	Team	Apps	(Gls)
1960–1966	1. FC Magdeburg		
1966–1976	Carl Zeiss Jena		

International career
1966–1974	East Germany	17	(0)
- * Club domestic league appearances and goals

Wolfgang Blochwitz (8 February 1941 – 8 May 2005) was a football goalkeeper from East Germany.

== Playing career ==
During his club career he played for 1. FC Magdeburg (1960–1966) and FC Carl Zeiss Jena (1966–1976). He made 275 appearances in the East German top flight.

He played 17 matches (19 if Olympic matches were also counted) for the East Germany national football team and was a backup keeper at the 1974 FIFA World Cup.

== Career after football ==
He was chairman at Carl Zeiss Jena between 1988 and 1990.
