= Roselore Sonntag =

German artistic gymnast (1934–2025)

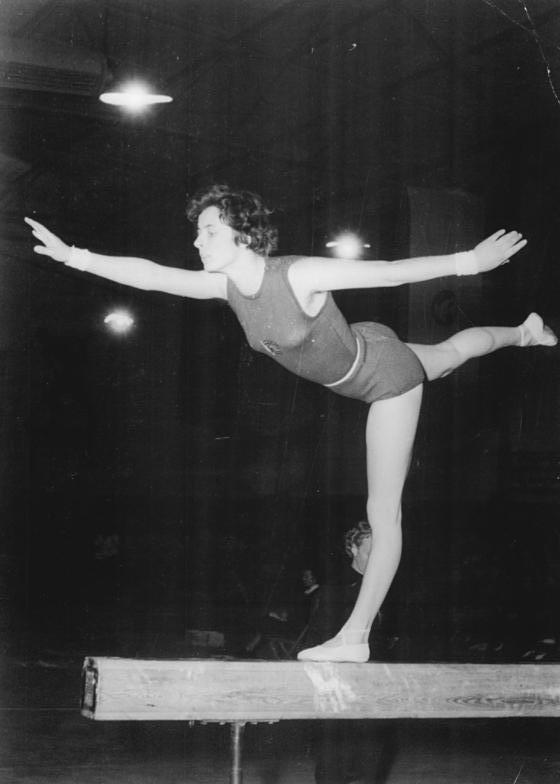
- Stöbe in 1955

Personal information
- Born: Roselore Stöbe; 6 February 1934 Geringswalde, Gau Saxony, Germany
- Died: 30 March 2025 (aged 91) Döbeln, Saxony, Germany
- Height: 1.65 m (5 ft 5 in)
- Weight: 51 kg (112 lb)

Sport
- Sport: Artistic gymnastics
- Club: SC Lok Leipzig

Roselore Sonntag (née Stöbe, 6 February 1934 – 30 March 2025) was a German gymnast. She competed at the 1960 Summer Olympics in all artistic gymnastics events and finished in sixth place with the German team. Individually her best achievement was 21st place in the balance beam. Between 1954 and 1960 she won 10 national titles, competing as Stöbe before 1957. Following her retirement from competition she had a long career as a gymnastics coach. Sonntag died on 30 March 2025, at the age of 91.
