= Stefan Wolle =

German historian

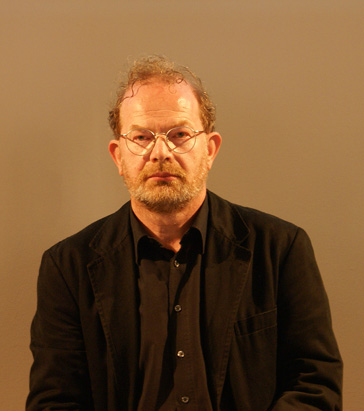
Stefan Wolle 2007

Stefan Wolle (born 22 October 1950) is a German historian. A focus of his socio-historical research is on the German Democratic Republic (East Germany) which is where, before reunification, he lived and worked.

== Life ==
Stefan Wolle was born in Halle. His father was a committed supporter of East Germany's recently constructed ruling party. He attended school in Berlin and embarked on a traineeship in the book trade. After undertaking his military service he was enrolled at Berlin's Humboldt University to study historical sciences. However, in 1972 he was released from the university on account of his "intellectual arrogance". However, he was subsequently permitted to return and pursue his studies at the Humboldt between 1973 and 1976. He still had not become a member of the Socialist Unity Party ("Sozialistische Einheitspartei Deutschlands" / SED), and never would: he spent the next thirteen years as an academic researcher, attached to the Central Historical Institute and the Institute for General History at the (East) German Academy of Sciences.

Wolle received his doctorate in 1984 for work on Vladimir the Great of Kievan Rus', consciously selected as a non-ideological topic, and reworked for publication as a book in 1991. He came to wider prominence in the context of the Peaceful Revolution which was followed by German reunification, formally in October 1990. During the second half of the 1980s he had been establishing contacts with underground opposition groups, and after the wall was breached in November 1989 he was able to become a Round Table expert witness on Stasi files. He was also a member of the "Normannenstraße Citizens Committee". He was tasked, together with Armin Mitter, with ensuring the preservation of files at the Stasi national centre in Normannenstraße as the Stasi operation itself was dissolved. During a period of rapid change, the occupation in January 1990 by concerned citizens (taking their cue from similar actions in Erfurt, Leipzig and Rostock) of the building housing the archives, thwarted a more extensive destruction of the evidence. In March 1990 Wolle and Mitter, using their access to the files, published a first edition of Stasi reports and instructions. 200,000 copies were printed within a few days and by July 1990 250,000 had been produced. The question of what to do with the Stasi archives had become pressing very quickly because of the extent and nature of government surveillance over citizens in East Germany between 1949 and 1989: in March 1990 a more structured approach to the archives began to emerge. Stefan Wolle served as a member of what became known as the Stasi Records Agency ("Bundesbeauftragter für die Stasi-Unterlagen" / BStU / "Gauck commission") between March 1990 and February 1991.

In February or March 1991 Wolle and Mitter were summarily dismissed from the Stasi Records Agency for "disloyalty". The dismissal came at the behest of Wolfgang Schäuble, at that time Interior Minister in the German government, and followed a television interview in which Wolle had disclosed that the name of the last East German prime minister, Lothar de Maizière, had appeared in Stasi files listing informal Stasi collaborators. (Schäuble's intervention appeared to have arisen because the disclosure about de Maizière directly contradicted public assurances previously given by Schäuble with respect to the matter.) The dismissal had been implemented by Joachim Gauck, then head of the Stasi Records Agency. Writing later in a memoir, Gauck recalled his very deep regret over the affair: he had been given no choice, and had indeed tried to reinstate Wolle at a later date.

Between 1991 and 1996 Wolle was engaged as an academic research assistant at the Humboldt University. Between 1996 and 1998 his work was funded by the German Research Foundation ("Deutsche Forschungsgemeinschaft" / DFG). Between 1998 and 2000 he worked with the National Foundation for the Evaluation of the SED Dictatorship ("Bundesstiftung zur Aufarbeitung der SED-Diktatur"). Since 2002 he has worked with the Forschungsverbund SED-Staat (" SED [one-party-]state Research Association") at Berlin's Free University.

Since 2005 Stefan Wolle has been director of academic research at the popular DDR Museum, which opened to the public in July 2006.

In July 2024 it was confirmed that Wolle would serve as Executive Producer on upcoming Cold War thriller Whispers of Freedom. The British-German co-production, which is based on the true story of Chris Gueffroy, is supported by the DDR Museum.
