= WHH GT 18 =

Type of residential building in Berlin, Germany

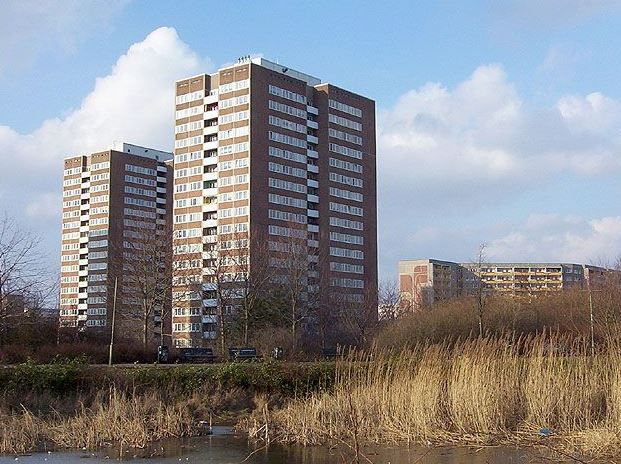
GT 18, Bürgerpark Marzahn

WHH GT 18 is a standard residential high-rise building type in East Berlin. It was developed by architects Helmut Stingl and Joachim Seifert between 1969 and 1971 using large panel construction for mixed-use housing in Berlin.

The acronym refers to the type WHH (Wohnhochhaus, residential tower), the GT stands for Großtafelbauweise (applied large-panel construction), and 18 for the number of storeys. The building is a detached structure or high point under the name of WHH GT 18/21 double as high-rise with 21 floors, with a load level of 6.3 tonnes. Depending on the version of the developed type, it contains 136 or 296 apartments. It is one of the largest large panel construction types in the former GDR.

The first example of this building type was erected in 1971 at the Holzmarktstraße in East Berlin. With the redevelopment of Fischerinsel, modified version of this series were built. From 1972 onward they were used in almost all East Berlin housing development projects. In contrast to the mostly 11-storey building with buildings of WBS 70 these buildings dominated high-rise urban construction. They were built near major road intersections, or in the vicinity of high capacity public transportation, such as subway or train stations.

== Specifications ==
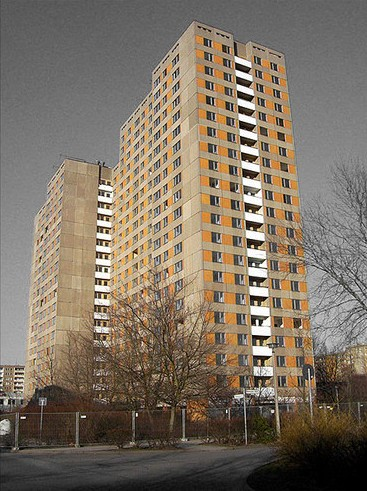
Gt 21/18, Oberweißbacher Straße, Berlin

- Principal material: Large panels of lightweight concrete
- Mass of the finished parts: a maximum of 6.3 t
- Structural grid: nominally 3.60 × 3.60 m
- Exterior walls:
  - 100 mm of B300 concrete
  - 50 mm polystyrene rigid insulation
  - 60 mm concrete
- Interior walls: 190 mm thick, 300 B reinforced and unreinforced concrete
- Floor structure: 3.60 m span, 14 cm thick steel reinforced B300 concrete
- Incorporation type: Continuous steel slab thickness of 1.00 m and
- 60 cm concrete slab for installation ducts
- Monolithic part in situ : first floor height of 4.20 m
- Roof shape and type of roof: low-slope roof, insulated
- Heat supply from district heating
- Home automation and transformer station on the ground floor
- Two elevators and exterior stairwell 3
