= Geringswalde =

- Town
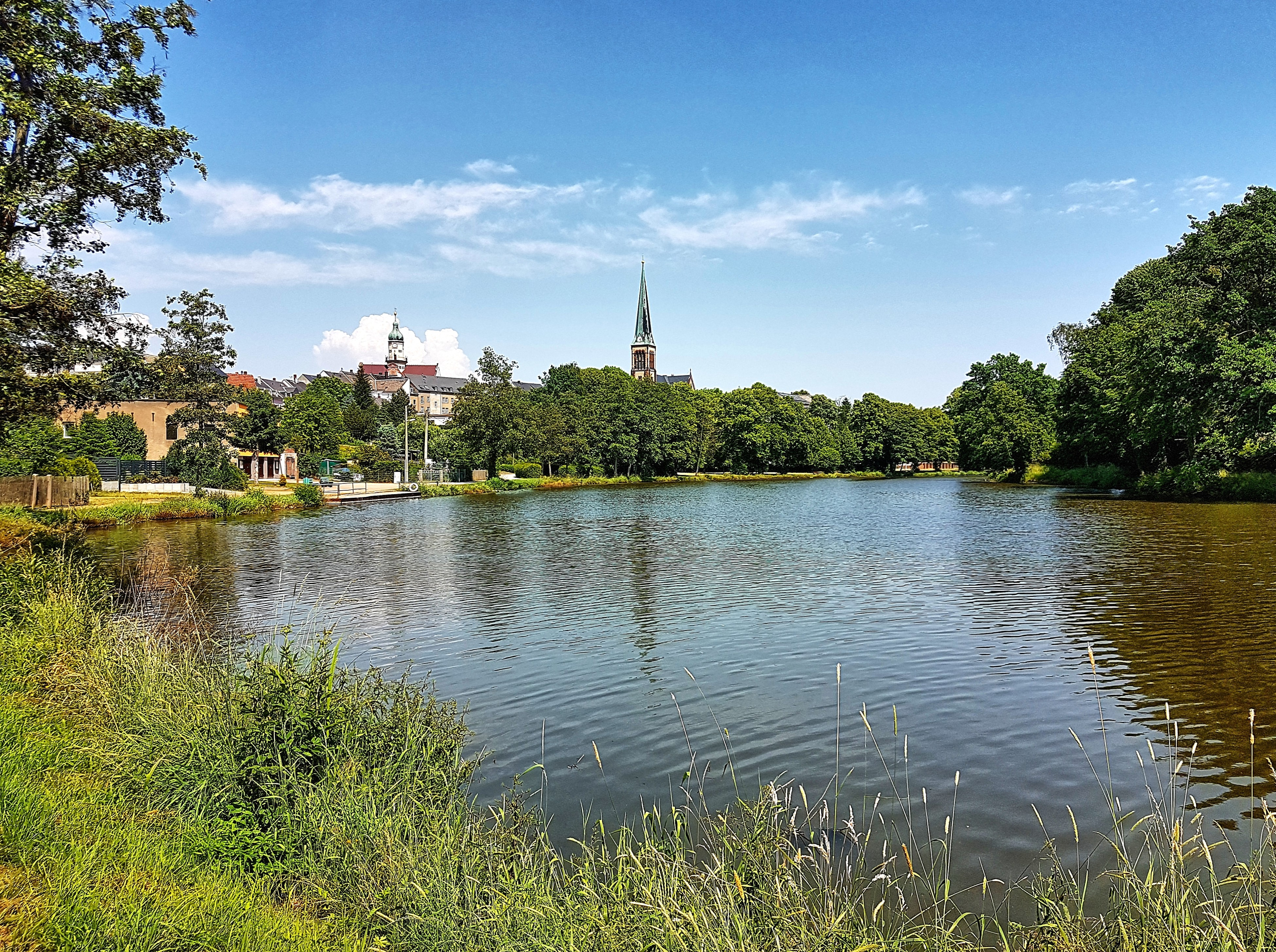
- View across pond towards Martin Luther church and town hall

- Coat of arms

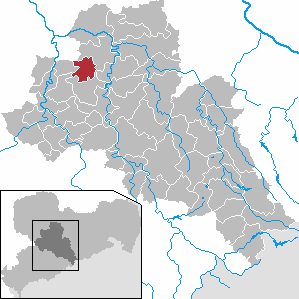
- Location of Geringswalde within Mittelsachsen district
- Interactive map of Geringswalde
- Location within Germany Location within Saxony
- Coordinates: 51°4′35″N 12°54′15″E
- Country: Germany
- State: Saxony
- District: Mittelsachsen

Government
  - Mayor (2022–29): Sandra Fischer

Area
  - Total: 30.06 km^{2} (11.61 sq mi)
- Elevation: 268 m (879 ft)

Population (2025-12-31)
  - Total: 3,994
  - Density: 132.9/km^{2} (344.1/sq mi)
- Time zone: UTC+01:00 (CET)
  - Summer (DST): UTC+02:00 (CEST)
- Postal codes: 09326
- Dialling codes: 037382
- Vehicle registration: FG (formerly MW)
- Website: www.geringswalde.de

Geringswalde (German pronunciation: [ɡeːʁɪŋsˈvaldə]) is a town in the district of Mittelsachsen, in Saxony, Germany. It is situated 12 km northwest of Mittweida, and 27 km north of Chemnitz.

== History ==
The town was first mentioned in 1233 in a document confirming the establishment of a Benedictine nun's convent as Gerungeswalde as a deserted oppidum together with a destroyed castle . After the Protestant reformation, the convent was dissolved and transformed into a manor. The town was never walled. An orthodox Lutheran school was funded in 1566, but closed again in 1568 due to the founder and the rector being accused of Gnesio-Lutheranism. 134 freeholders were counted in 1587, but in 1764 there were only 36 freeholders and 168 smallholders.

A stream traversing the grounds of the town was dammed in the Middle Ages, forming a large pond known as Großteich.

Until the 19th century, the economy was chiefly based on agriculture and linen manufacture. After industrialization Geringswalde was known for the production of furniture (mainly chairs and armchairs) and cutting tools. The manor was dissolved after World War II and most of its buildings demolished. Geringswalde was part of Kreis Rochlitz from 1945 to 1994, of Landkreis Mittweida from 1994 to 2008 and belongs now to the Central Saxony administrative district.

In 1949, the neighbouring villages of Hilmsdorf and Klostergeringswalde were incorporated into the town, Altgeringswalde joined in 1994, and in 1999 Aitzendorf (with Dittmannsdorf), Arras, and Holzhausen (with Hoyersdorf and Neuwallwitz) were incorporated.

Year	Inhabitants
1834	2252
1871	2850
1890	2891
1910	4499
1925	4293
1939	4278
1950	6290
1964	5956
1990	4680
2000	5445

From 1893 to 1997, the town was served by the standard-gauge railway line Waldheim - Rochlitz.

== Economy ==
Traditional occupations were agriculture, weaving of linen, legwear knitting, tannery, and brewing. A stream drove several watermills. Industrialisation in the 19th century brought large-scale furniture making and metalworking to the town. There were also a brickyard and a cigar factory. The brewery closed in the 1920s.

After World War II until the early 1990s the economy of the town was dominated by tool making, furniture making and the production of hydraulic cylinders. Some smaller factories produced clothes, cosmetics, electronic circuits, animal fodder, and concrete parts. Most factories closed in the early 1990s, but the tradition of metalworking in particular is still continued by several small and medium-sized enterprises. A number of wind turbines has been erected on the heights surrounding the town since the 2000s.

== Sights ==
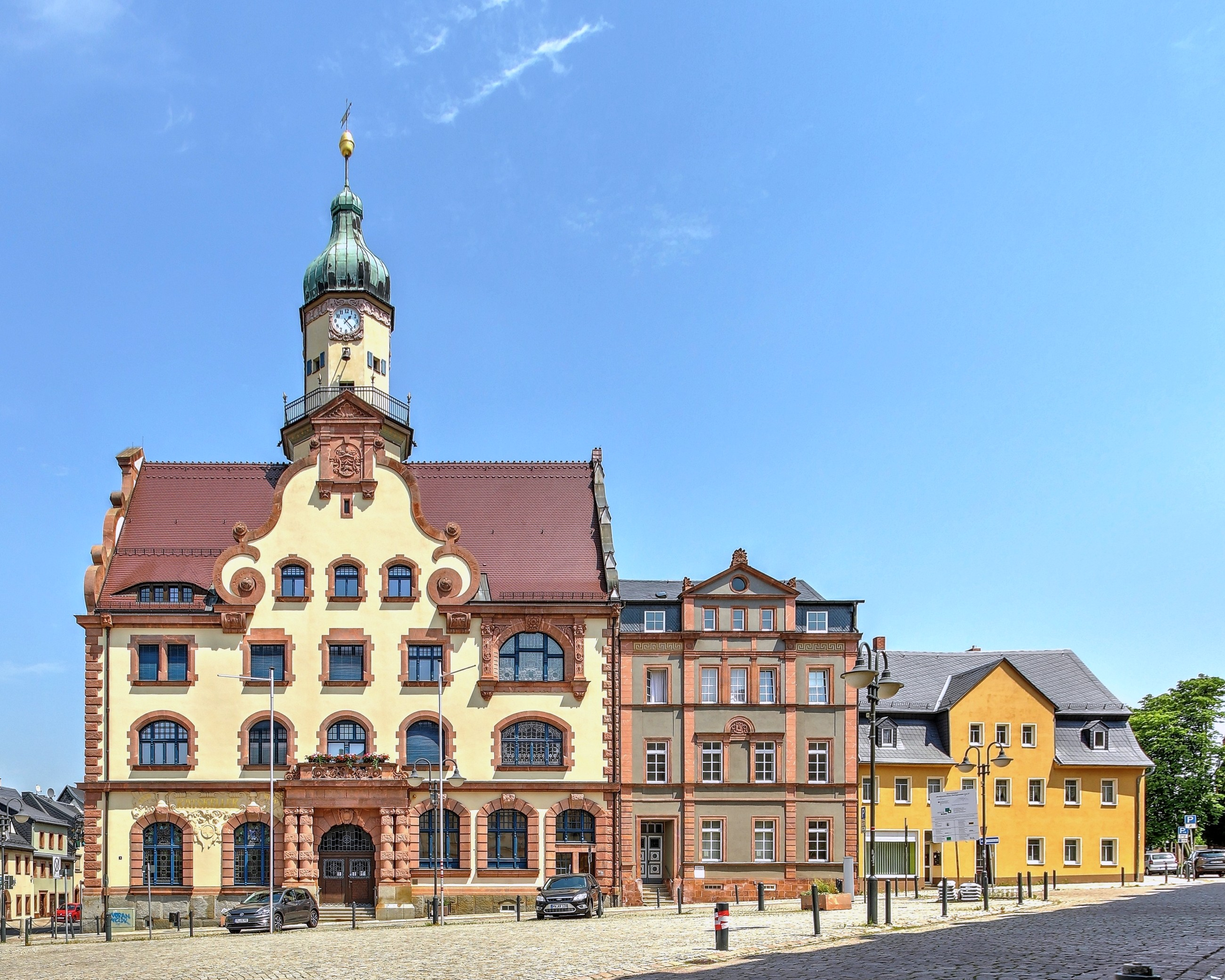
Town hall

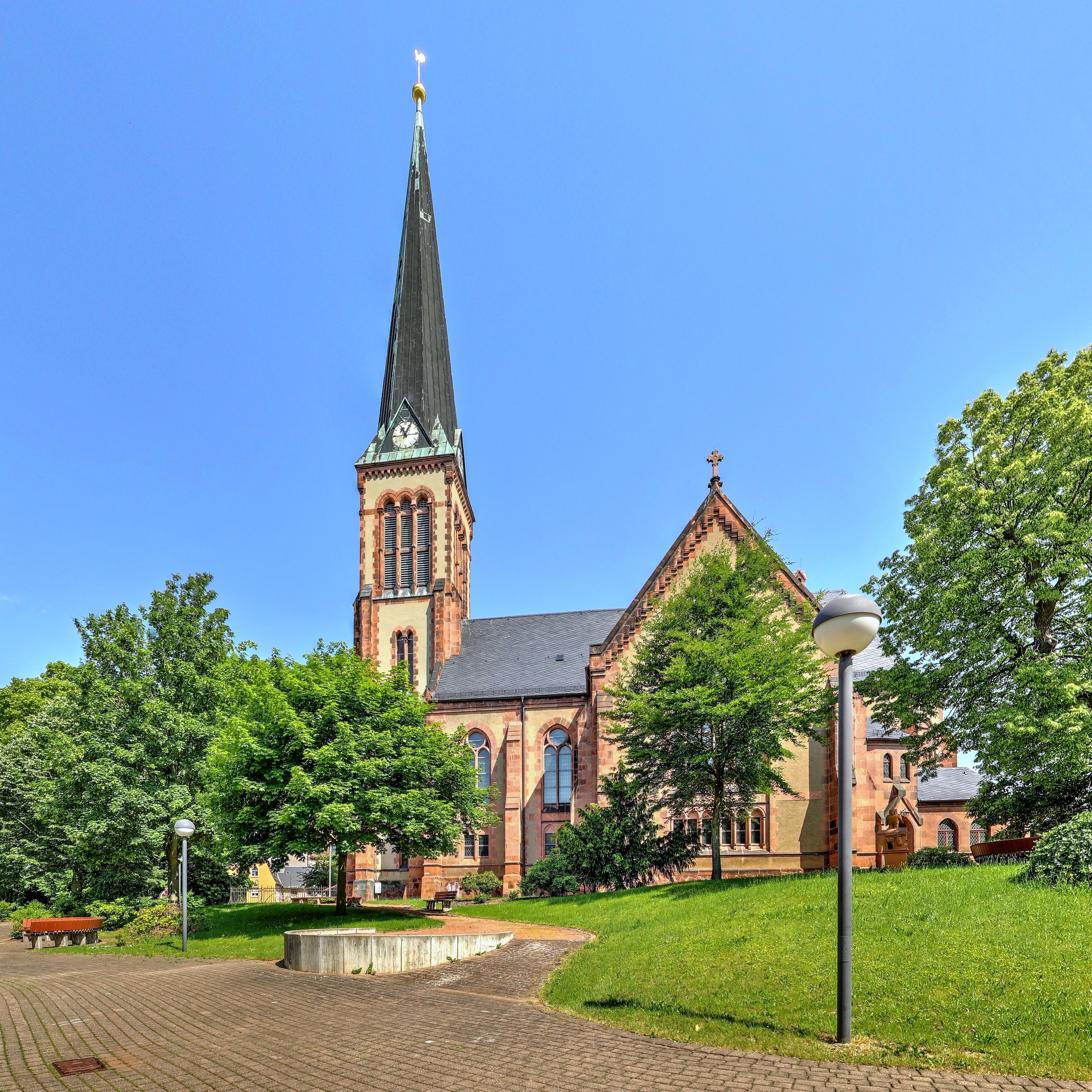
Martin Luther church

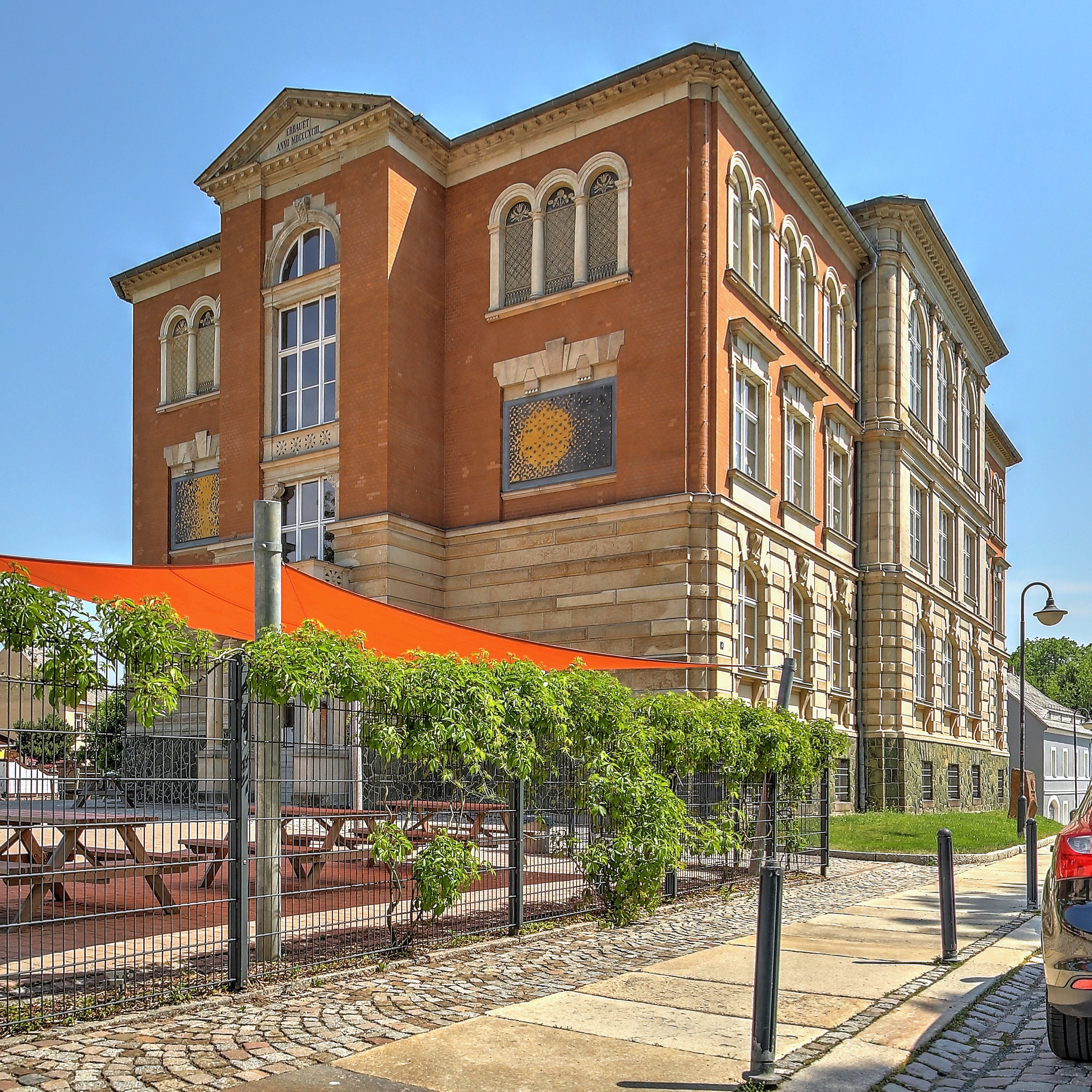
Schoolhouse

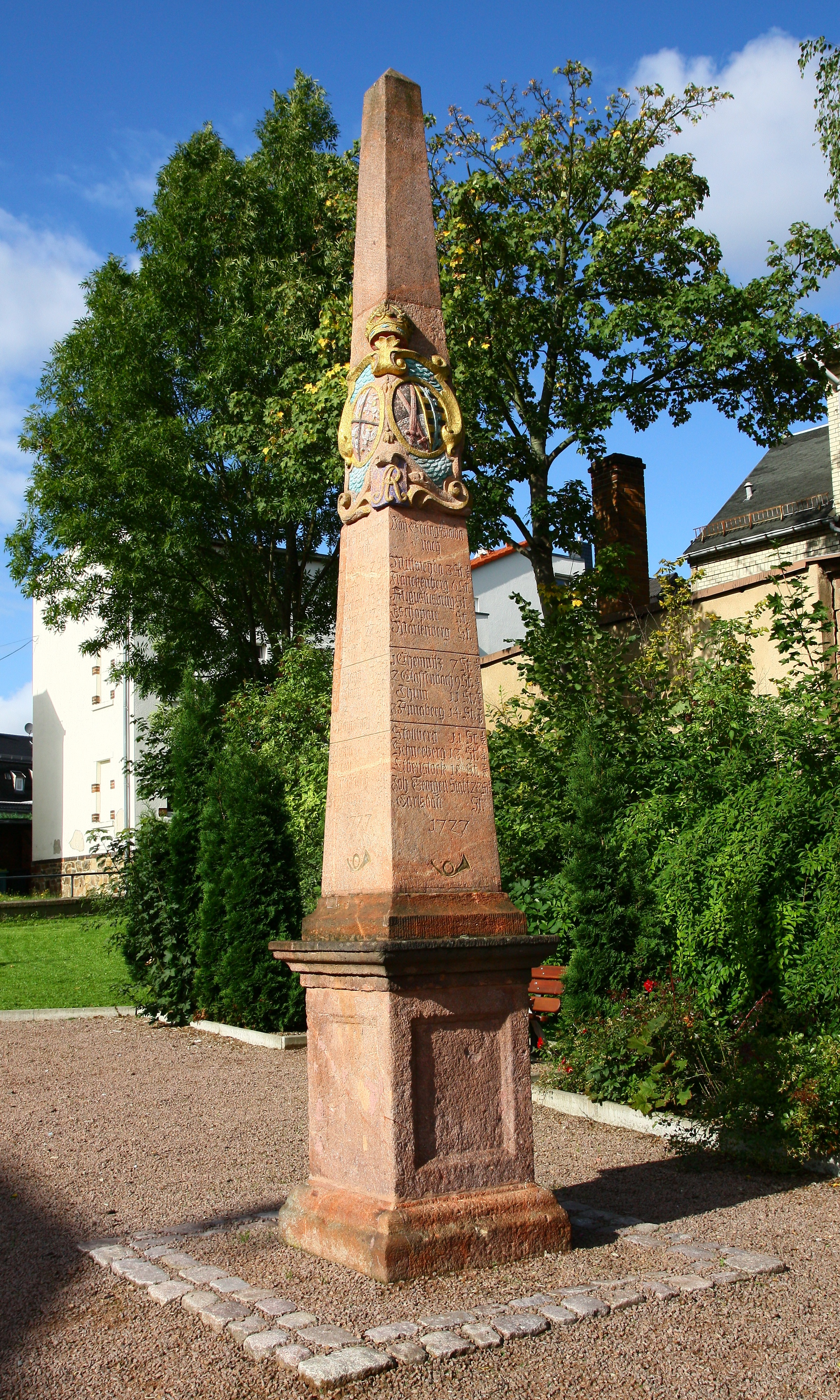
Post milestone (restored)

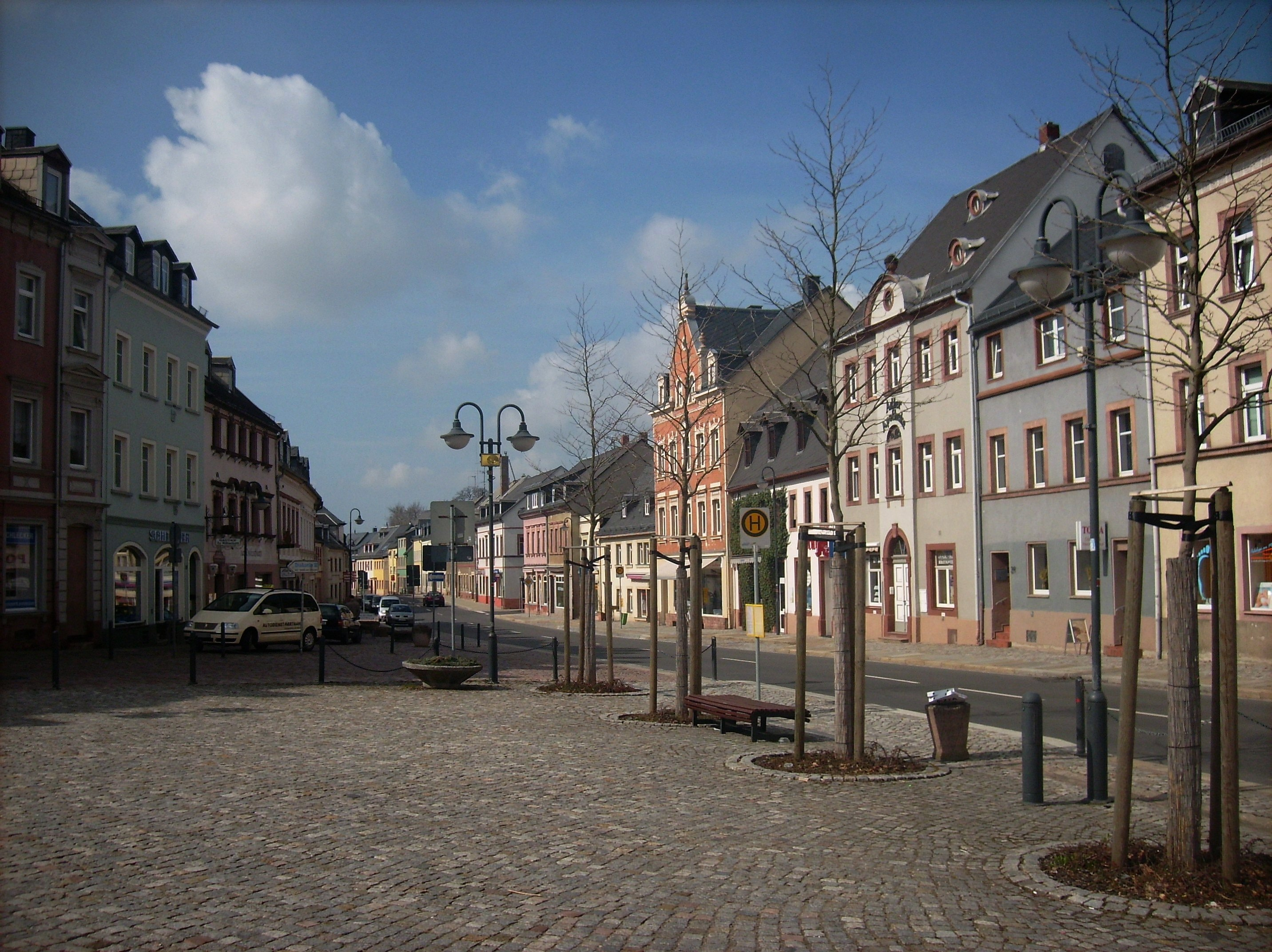
Market square

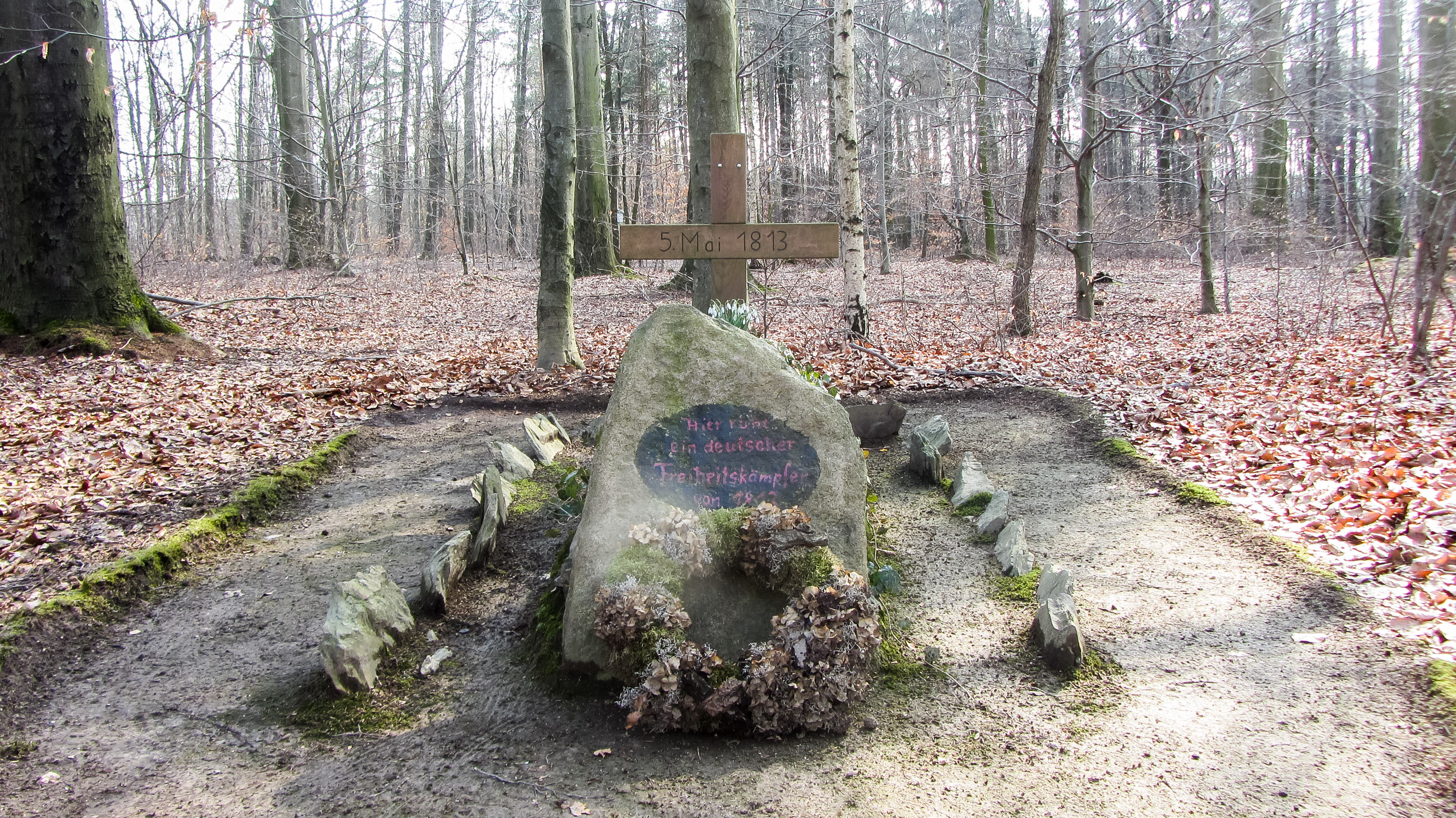
Grave of a fighter in the Napoleonic wars, north of the town

The neo-Gothic Martin Luther church of 1890 replaces a former Romanesque church. The neo-Baroque town hall was opened in 1905, the schoolhouse in neo-Renaissance style in 1894. An observation tower named after Frederick Augustus III of Saxony, situated north of the town, opened in 1907.

A copy of the 1727 Saxon post milestone (Postmeilensäule) stands near the town centre. The original is kept in a museum in Rochlitz.

A castle in the nearby forest was destroyed in the Middle Ages, only minuscule remains of its basement walls are left.

The village church of Altgeringswalde houses a painted wooden altar which was made around 1510 and restored in 1994.

360-degree panorama of the market square, in the middle the town hall, to the right the old town hall, further to the right the Martin Luther Church, to the left of the town hall runs the Bundesstraße 175 (Leipziger Straße / Dresdener Straße)

== Personalities ==
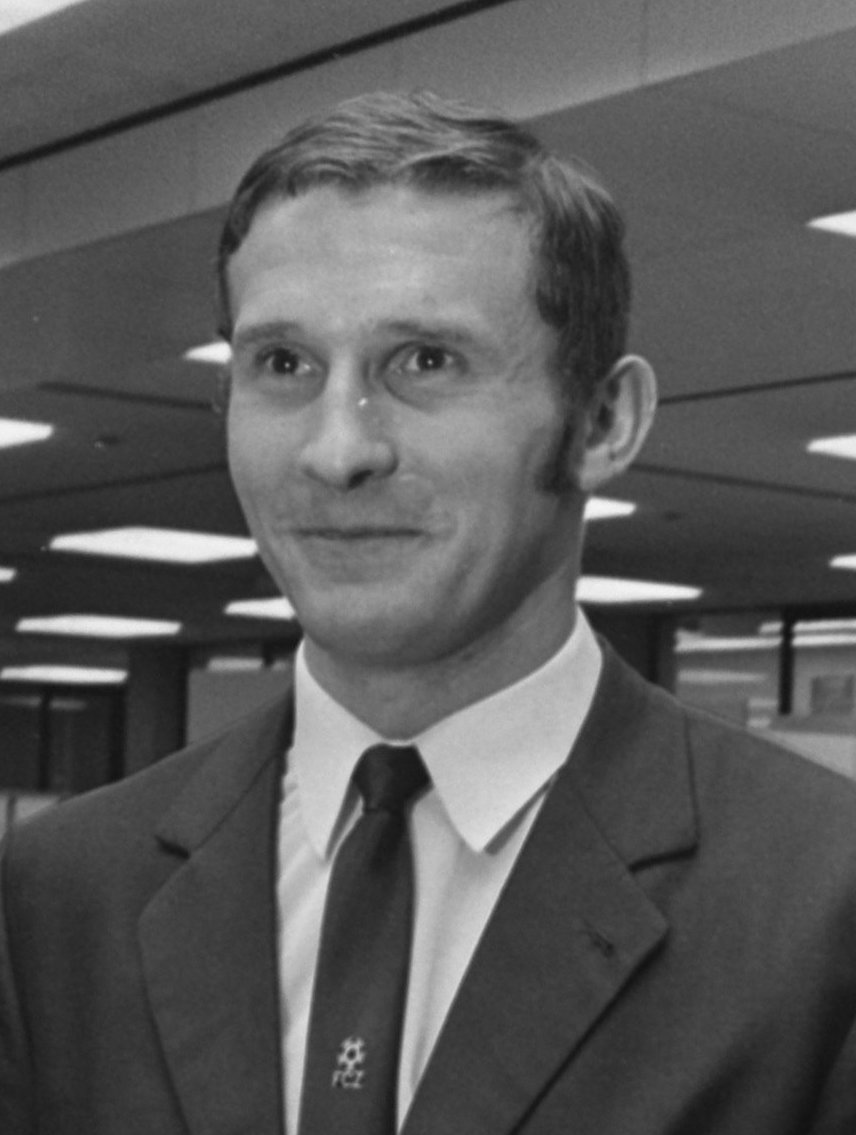
Wolfgang Blochwitz (front) in 1970

- Wilfried Stallknecht (1928–2019), architect, urban planner and furniture designer
- Roselore Sonntag (1934–2025), gymnast, Olympic contender in Rome 1960
- Wolfgang Blochwitz (1941–2005), football goalkeeper, played 19 times for the national team of the GDR
