= Q3A Panel house =

Type of housing in East Germany

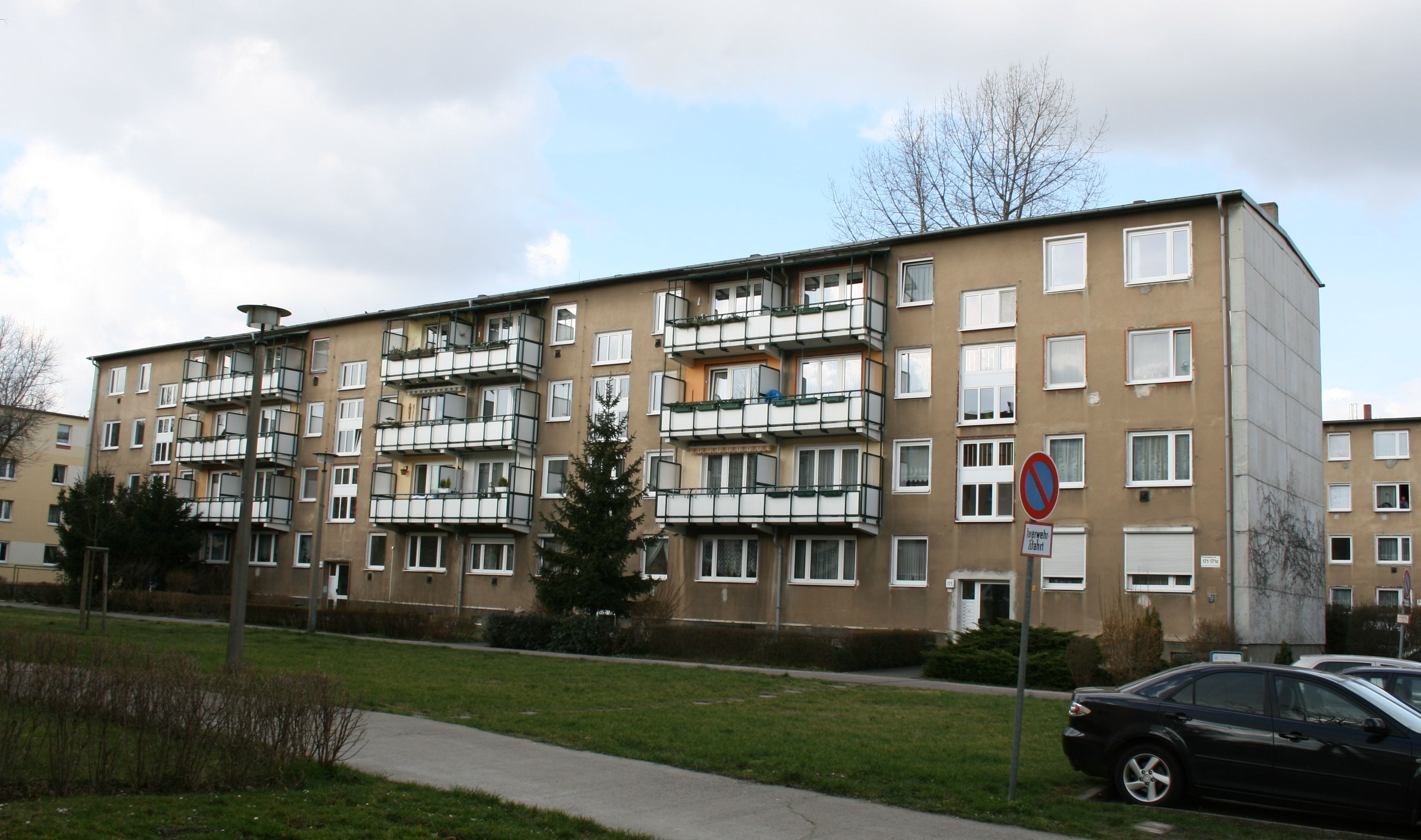
Q3A-frontal view

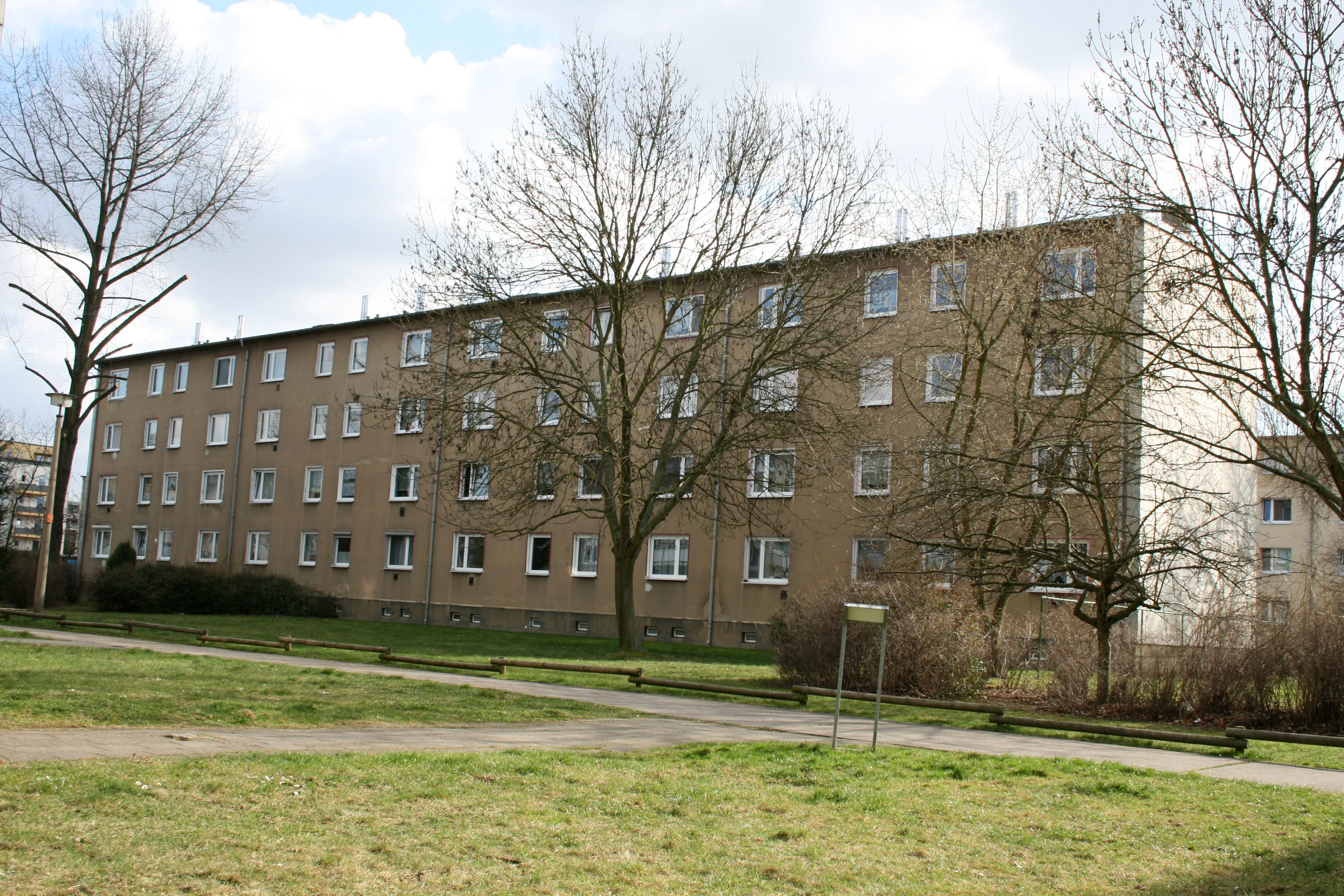

The Q3A is a type of three, four and five storey prefabricated building constructed in East Germany in the 1950s and 1960s. The letter "Q" in the abbreviation stands for "Querwandbau" (cross wall construction).

== Description ==
In a Q3A panel house, the walls are constructed entirely from concrete blocks, while the ceiling consists of multiple concrete plates that were placed perpendicular to, and on top of the wall elements. This explains the source of the "cross wall construction" name. The flat roof construction is the most visible difference between the Q3A series and other East Germany buildings of its time. Q3A homes are equipped with a furnace for heating, and a balcony for use by tenants was also provided in approximately half the cases. In later years (after the fall of the Berlin Wall and German Reunification), most houses were retrofitted with additional balconies.

The concrete blocks and ceiling elements of the first houses were manufactured at an industrial plant in the Ostseestrasse in Berlin. Other types of panel construction used for Q3A houses were the IW57- and IW58-types. These were produced in much smaller numbers, with some even lacking the signature flat roof, being built with a more classic Hip Roof.

Shortly after the first houses were erected in 1957 in the eight quarters of East Berlin, further series utilizing cross wall construction were developed. The QX-series, which were mostly 4-storey buildings, were not constructed from blocks, but from cheaper concrete strips. Most buildings of this series can be found in the "Hans-Loch" quarter, which was the first, newly constructed, large-scale settlement in East Berlin after the end of the Second World War. While Q3A block buildings were used in most areas of the GDR, the QX-series was constructed on a relatively limited basis. It is therefore regarded as an experimental series.

Further developments of cross-wall panel buildings happened from 1959 to 1983. These, even more frequently built homes, had the building type designation QP or QP64, for those mainly built in 1964. They were built with five, eight or ten storeys and in contrast to the two previous Q-series buildings, fulfilled the existing building codes by being furnished with a lift. The QP-series was the first type of house utilizing larger, industrial-sized panels. Each individual plate forms a complete wall of a room. The most striking and visible feature of many houses in the QP series is the colouring of the exterior walls, usually consisting of white or yellow tiles. The first buildings of this series originated in Berlin, between Strausberg and the Alexanderplatz, in the western half of the former Stalin Avenue as well as the Hans-Loch Quarter.

The early 1970s were marked by the arrival of by far the most common series -- the WBS70 (Wohnungsbauserie 70). Approximately 900,000 apartment units of this type were constructed -- consisting of five-, six- and eleven-storey buildings. Other large-panel series were the P2 and WHH GT 18 series. These were constructed as part of the "Sonderbauprogramm Berlin" (special construction program Berlin), which allocated special funds to improving the housing of what was then, the capital of the GDR -- East Berlin.

== Specifications ==
Q3A

- Basic principle: light concrete construction utilising pre-fabricated blocks
- Mass of the prefabricated parts: Maximum of 0.8 metric tons
- Distance between the inner transverse walls: 2.40 m and 3.60 m
- Building depth: 10.0 m
- Roof shape: flat, sloping cold-roof with bituminous roofing membranes
- Balcony arrangement: if present, in pairs at the front long side
- Built in Berlin: 1957-1969 28,600 housing units
  - subsequent variants: IW64 (type "Brandenburg")

QX

- Basic principle: light concrete construction utilising pre-fabricated strips
- Mass of the prefabricated parts: Maximum of 1.0 metric tons
- Roof shape: flat, pitched cold-roof
- Balcony arrangement: in pairs and individually on the front long side
- Built in Berlin: 1959-1964 3300 housing units
  - subsequent variant: Type "Magdeburg"

QP

- Basic principle: light concrete construction utilising pre-fabricated panels
- Mass of the prefabricated parts: Maximum of 5.0 metric tons
- Types: QP59, QP61, Qp62, QP64, QP71, QP71R
- Roof shape: Butterfly-/V-shaped, cold-roof with "bekriechbarem Drempelraum" (air vents large enough to be accessed via crawling)
- Balcony arrangement: often on both long sides; but, depending on the type, sometimes also only on the front long side
- Built in Berlin: 1959-1983 35,000 housing units
