= P2 (panel building) =

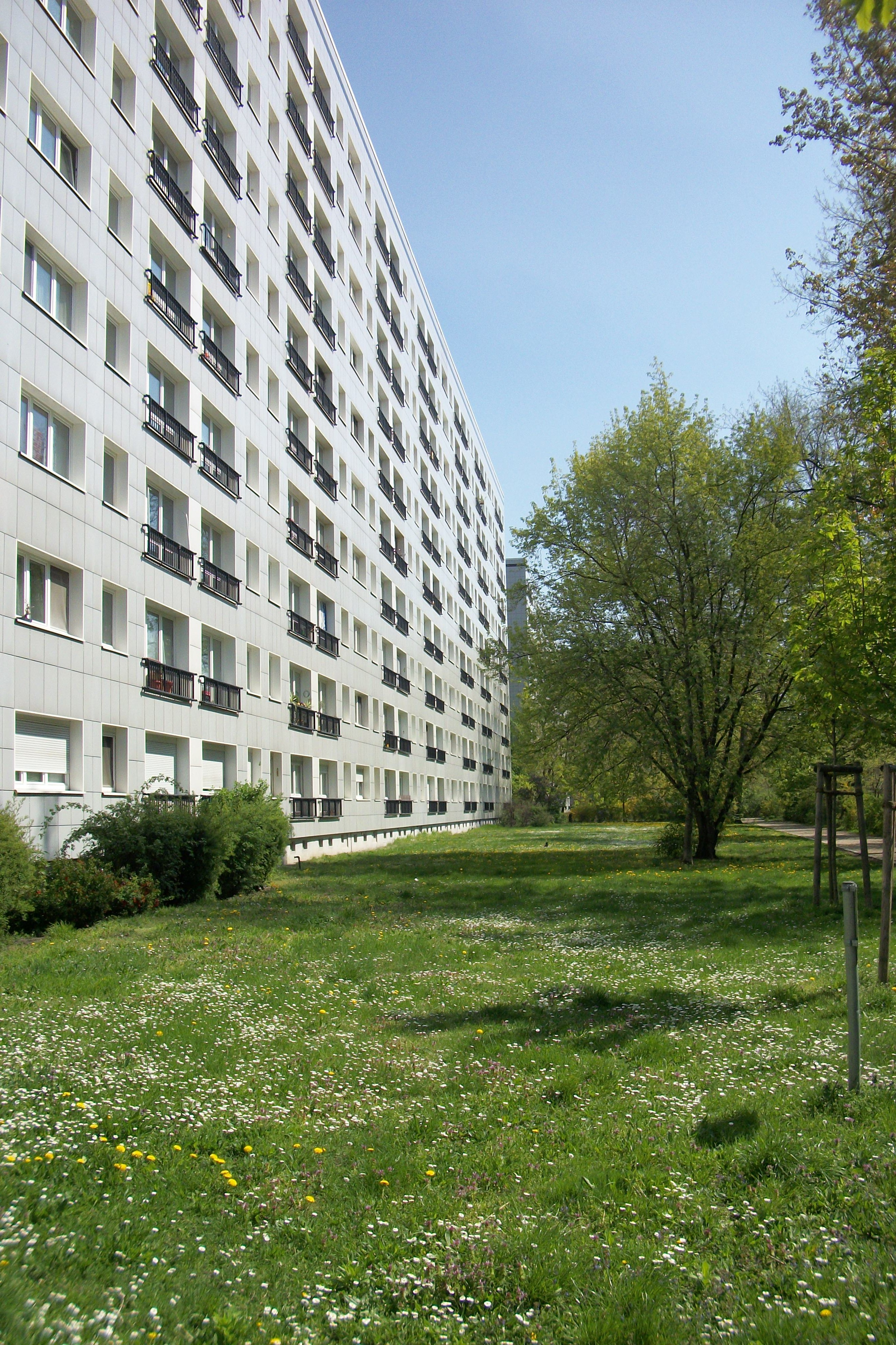
Renovated P2/10 on Mollstraße, Berlin

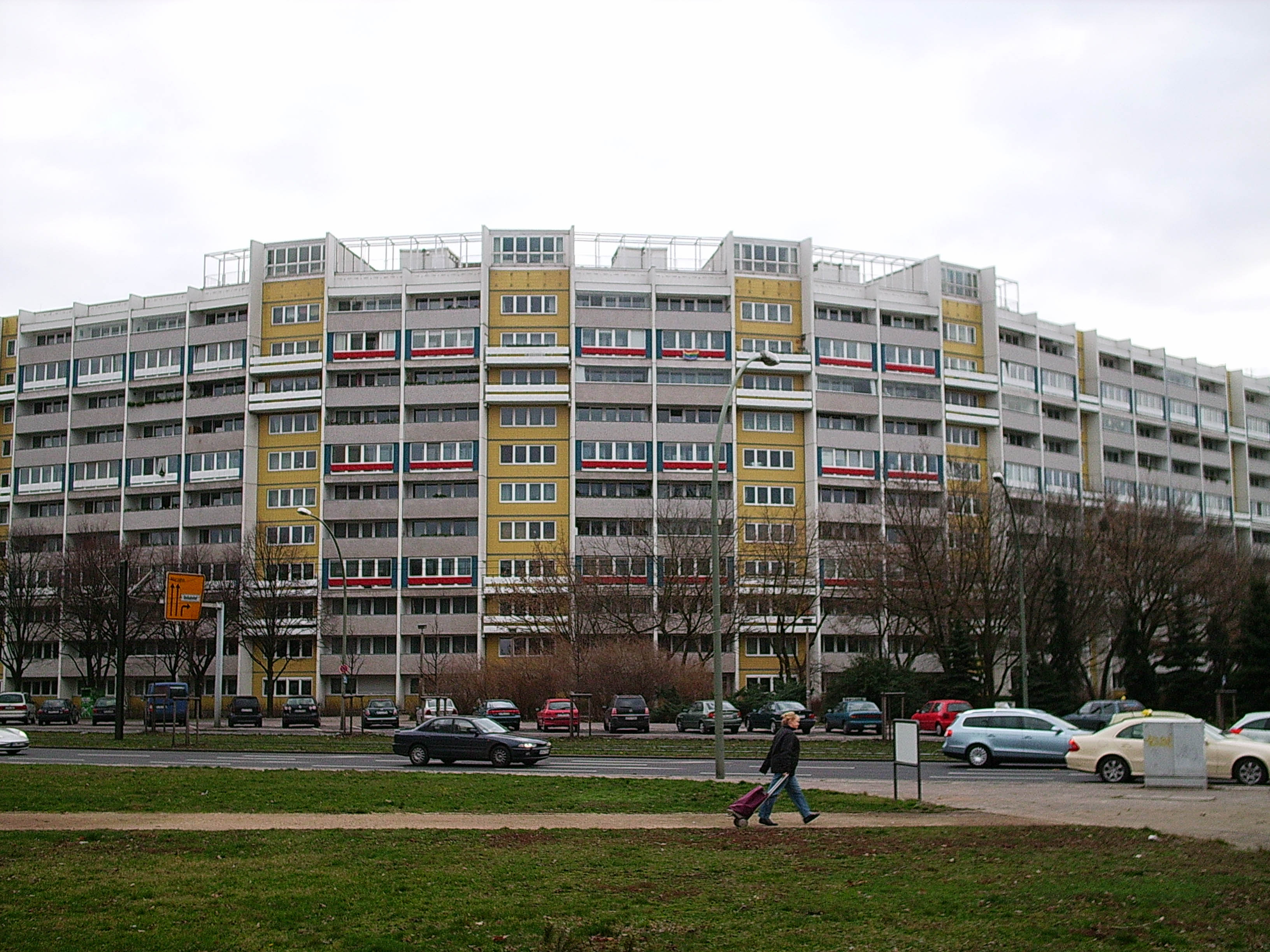
Adapted P2 buildings on the Place of the United Nations (Platz der Vereinten Nationen) in Berlin

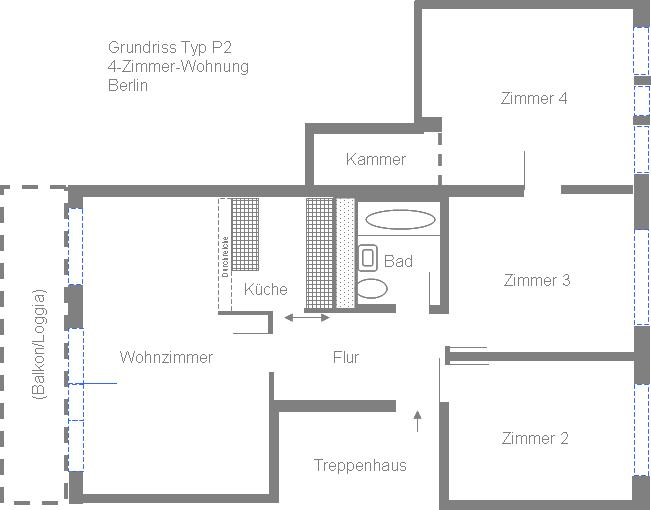
Example layout of a 4-room apartment

P2 is the abbreviation for a type of residential panel building found in former East Germany. The P stands for parallel and refers to load-bearing walls arranged parallel to wall surfaces. 2 denotes the arrangement of two stairways in a building.

The first building of this type was built in 1961 as an experimental building in Berlin-Lichtenberg. The original building was located at Erich-Kuttner-Straße 9-15 in the Fennpfuhl district and is now a listed building.

== Stairs and arrangement of dwellings ==
A P2 building is characterized by the arrangement of apartments around a nearly square interior stairwell, often equipped with a glass roof. The buildings have five to eleven stories and there are usually two apartments per floor, although some designs have three apartments per floor, above and below the stairwell access.

== Floors ==
As a standard design, the P2 is five or six stories high, with the lowest floor raised half a story above the ground. This allows natural light and ventilation to the basement, and minimizes the excavation required for the foundation. The building interior can be accessed by way of an outdoor stairway or via a half-staircase in the entrance area.

The staircase and access area reduce the amount of space available for a ground-floor apartment. Therefore the ground floor arrangement consists of a four-room apartment and a one-bedroom apartment - unlike the symmetric three-bedroom apartments on the upper floors. The remaining space is configured as a hallway.

In P2-buildings with more than six stories, every third floor has a distribution hallway. The hallway is usually located on the entrance side of a building and serves as the access or entrance to stairwells, elevators, waste discharge and storerooms. The apartments located above or below the distribution hallways are not accessed directly from the elevator but via a staircase. Typically the distribution hallways are arranged like this:

- P2/10 (with 10 stories): first, third, sixth and ninth floors
- P2/11 (with 11 stories): first, fourth, seventh and tenth floors (Seventh floor has an emergency exit passage connecting to a neighboring building).

== Apartment ==
As a standard, apartments in P2-buildings have one-to-four rooms. In buildings with special elements, such as a trapezoidal shape, there are also 5-room apartments with two rooms that have no right angles.

Originally there were no loggias on the raised ground floor. Ground floor loggias were added later in the course of reconstruction work.

== Kitchens and baths ==
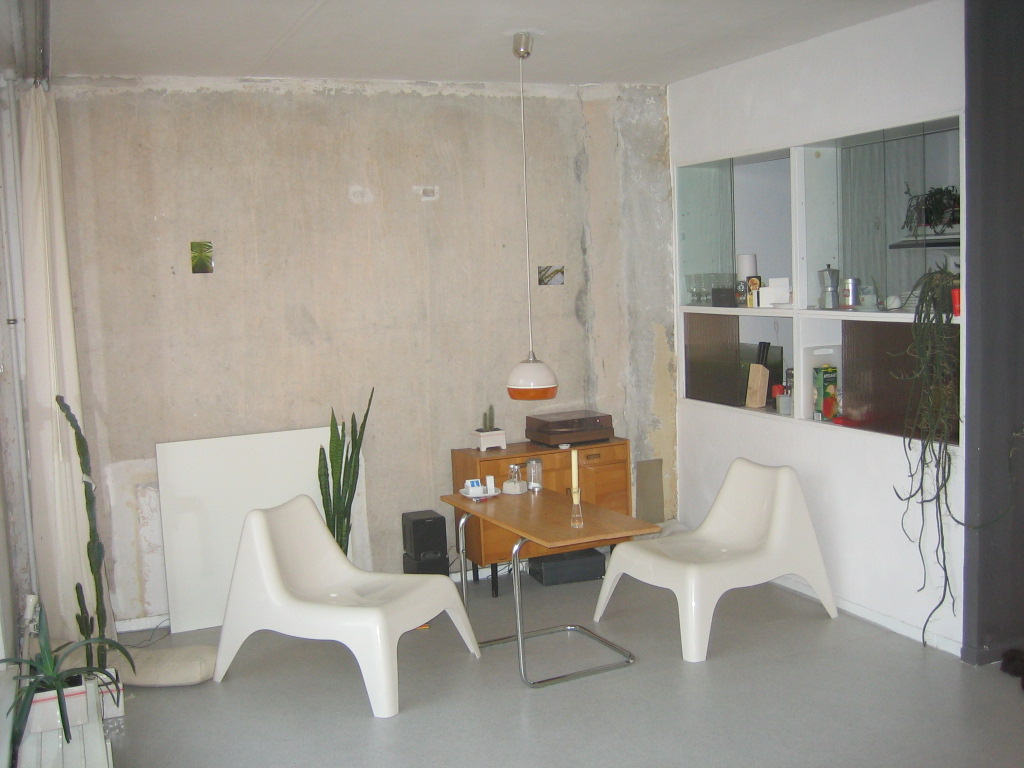
Kitchen hatch

The novelty of the bathrooms and kitchens is the optimization of space. The bathrooms and kitchens are located inside and next to each other and they utilize the same supply shaft for water, sewage, and ventilation. Bathrooms are fully equipped sanitary room modules (including toilet, sink, tub, faucets and washing machine connection; and kitchen modules include vertical supply and disposal lines. During construction, they are lifted into the shell construction in one piece. The bathroom and kitchen modules require a simple connection to the pipes at ground level for installation. The walls of the service shaft are made of different materials, ranging from pressboard over the plaster to massive concrete elements.

The designers avoided the typical kitchen and separate dining room arrangement, which required a lengthwise format and separated the family during meal preparation. This arrangement reduced living space and therefore reduced expenses. The designers hoped to integrate women more effectively into the family by opening the kitchen to the living room and thereby encouraging men to participate in the household. The kitchens were initially connected to the living rooms by large service hatches in the form of built-in furniture.

After widespread criticism that the kitchen was not isolated enough from the living room, later buildings incorporated concrete walls with a small hatch window. In the last series produced, the kitchen was completely separated from the living room by a wall. Daylight fell into the kitchen only through the door or service hatch.

== Specifications ==
- Finished parts in the load level to 5.0 t
- Grid 6 m × 6 m
- Building depth (standard) 12 m
- Story height from 2.60 to 2.80 m
- Number of floors: 5 to 11 - and with retail and office floors up to 14
