= WBS 70 =

Type of housing in East Germany

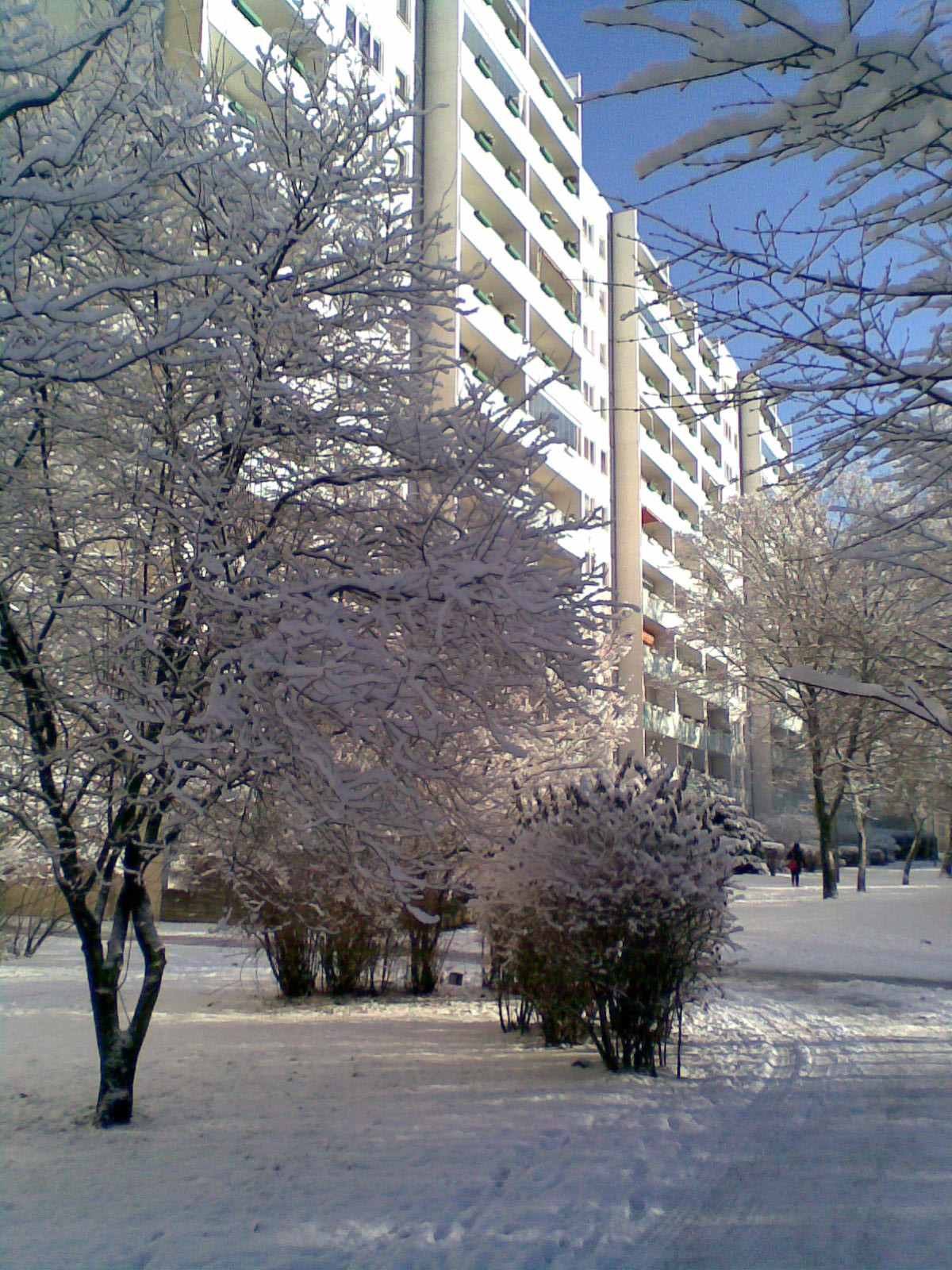
WBS 70/11, in Berlin in Winter

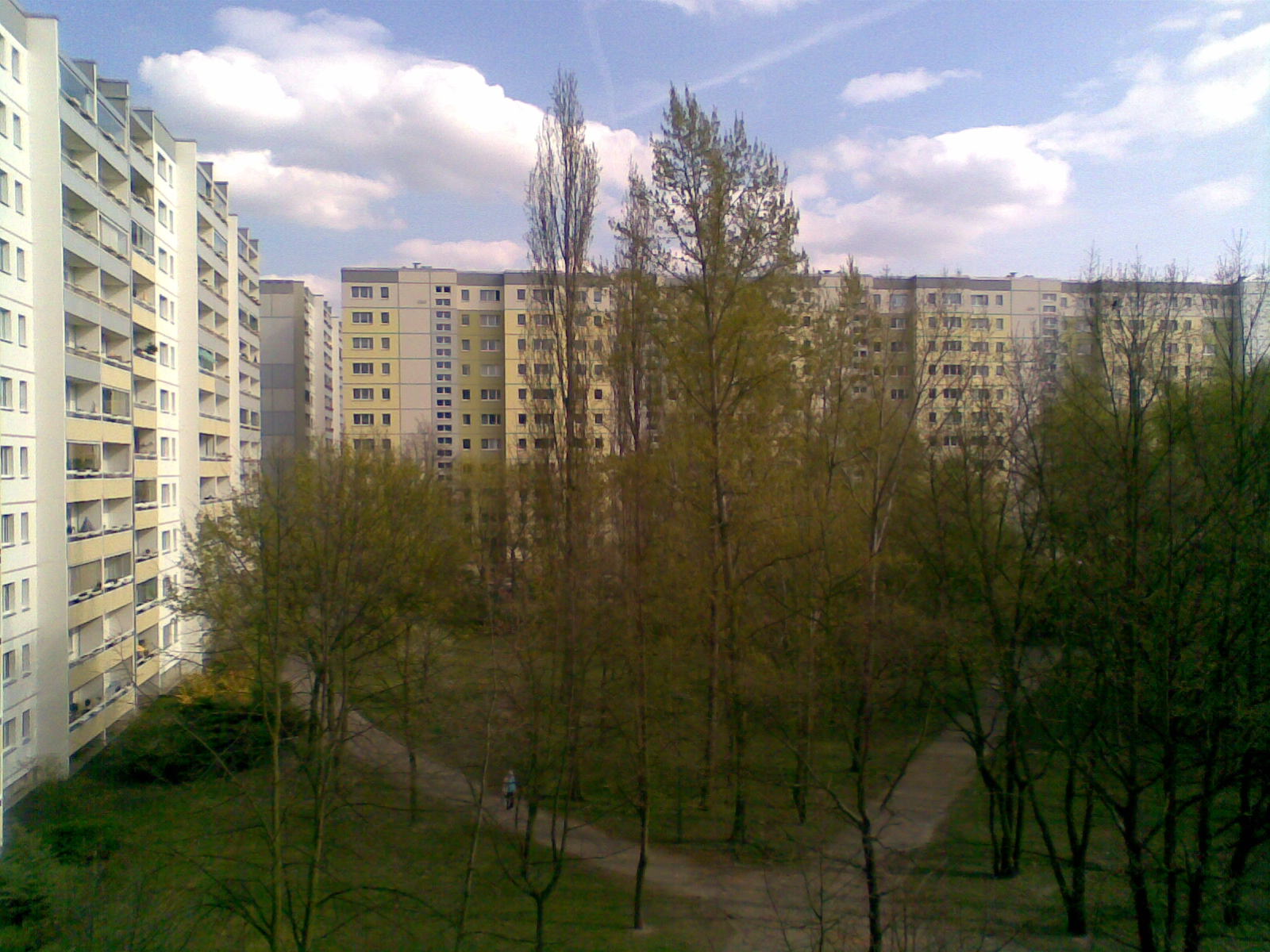
WBS 70/11 in Berlin-Prenzlauer Berg-Nord

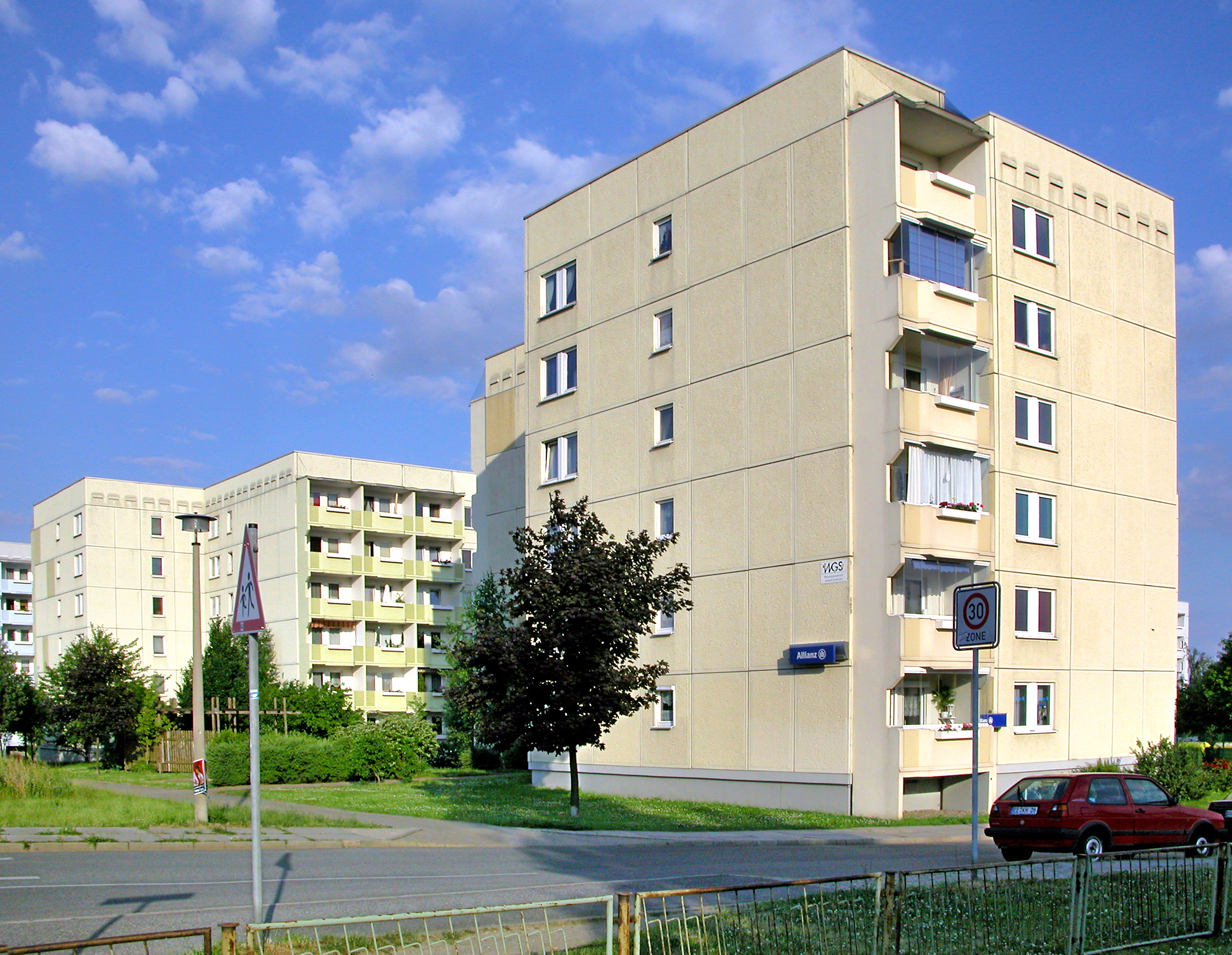
separate 6-storey blocks in Dresden

WBS 70 (Wohnungsbauserie 70th series) is a type of dwelling that was built in the German Democratic Republic using slab construction. It was developed in the early 1970s by the German Academy of Architecture and the Technical University of Dresden. In 1973, the first block in the city was built in Neubrandenburg and this house is now a historical monument. Of the approximately 1.52 million dwellings constructed in slab construction to 1990, the Type 70 WBS is widespread, accounting for up to 42 percent of housing constructed in the East.

In Berlin-Hellersdorf, there is a museum at Hellersdorfer Strasse 179 open to visitors of the apartment type WBS 70th. The 61-square-meter three-room apartment was furnished with original household items manufactured in the GDR.

In Russia, several microdistricts of WBS 70 houses were built in the 1990s as part of contracts with German construction companies for gas infrastructure workers and military housing. Notable examples include residential quarters in Chaykovsky and Polazna (Perm Krai), as well as in Izhevsk.

The DDR Museum in Berlin also contains a full-size replica of a WBS 70 flat with five rooms.

== Technical details ==
- Load range: 6.3 tons (63 kN)
- Modular system, basic grid: 6.00 meters × 6.00 meters
- Building depth: 10.8, 12.0 or 14.4 meters
- Floor height: 2.80 meters (WBS 70/G: 3.30 meters)
- Number of storeys: 5, 6 or 11
- Outer wall: three layers with core insulation
- Interior bathrooms, lying outside staircase

== Functional features ==
- Minimizing traffic areas in buildings and housing for the benefit of living space
- Variability of apartment sizes and occupancy density by assembling the different functional units
- Adjust the number of stories and the outline of the floor plans to the functional and urban demands by vertical and horizontal combination of functional units.
