= Athletics at the 1960 Summer Olympics =

Athletics at the Games of the XVII Olympiad
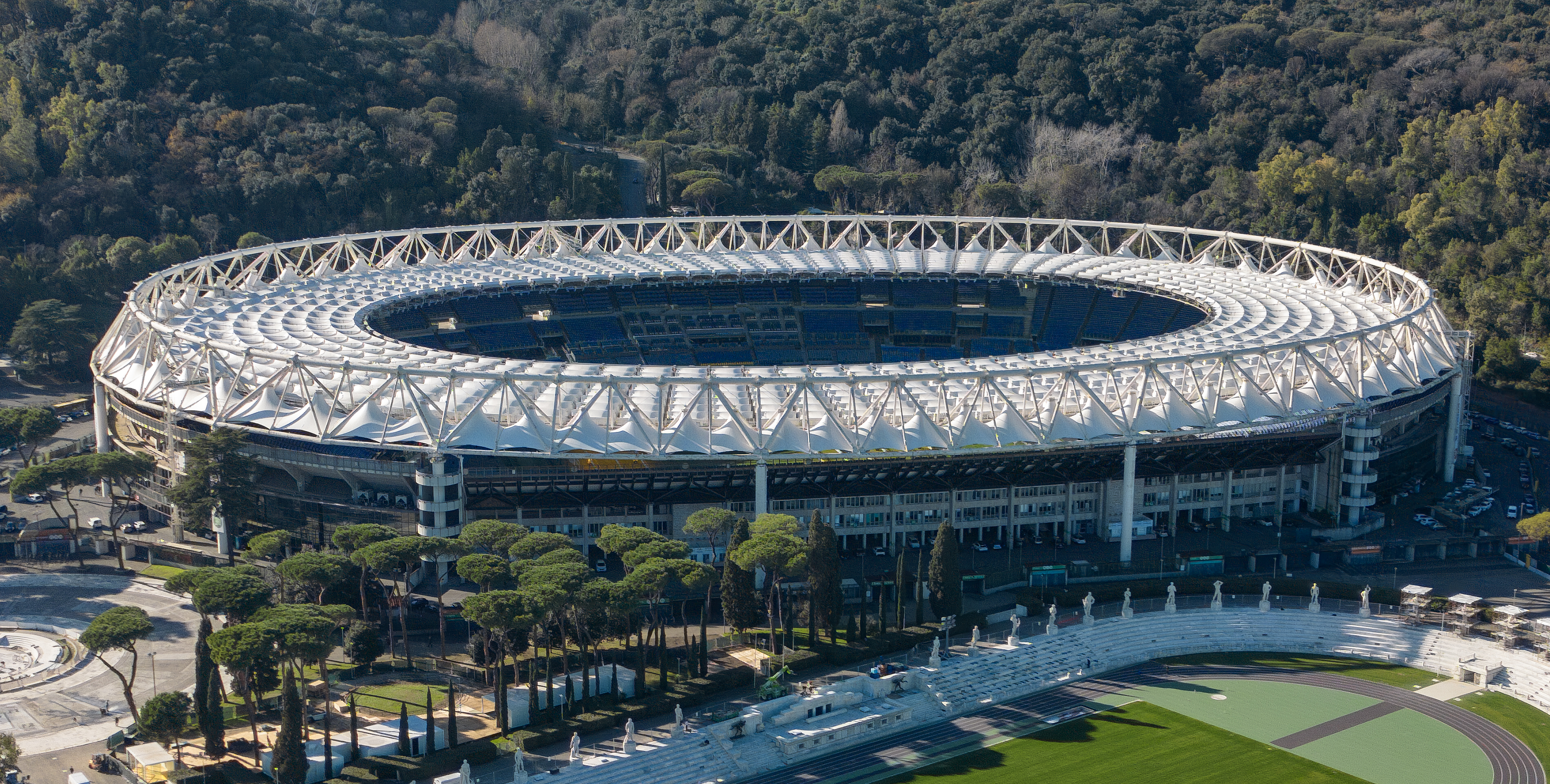
- Host stadium (shown in 2024)
- Venue: Stadio Olimpico
- Dates: August 31–September 8
- Competitors: 1,016 from 73 nations

At the 1960 Summer Olympics in Rome, 34 events in athletics were contested, 24 by men and 10 by women. There were a total number of 1016 participating athletes from 73 countries.

== Medal summary ==
=== Men ===
Event	Gold		Silver		Bronze	
100 metres	Armin Hary; United Team of Germany	10.2 (=OR)	Dave Sime; United States	10.2 (=OR)	Peter Radford; Great Britain	10.3
200 metres	Livio Berruti; Italy	20.5 (=WR)	Lester Carney; United States	20.6	Abdoulaye Seye; France	20.7
400 metres	Otis Davis; United States	44.9 (WR)	Carl Kaufmann; United Team of Germany	44.9 (WR)	Malcolm Spence; South Africa	45.5
800 metres	Peter Snell; New Zealand	1:46.3 (OR)	Roger Moens; Belgium	1:46.5	George Kerr; British West Indies	1:47.1
1500 metres	Herb Elliott; Australia	3:35.6 (WR)	Michel Jazy; France	3:38.4	István Rózsavölgyi; Hungary	3:39.2
5000 metres	Murray Halberg; New Zealand	13:43.4	Hans Grodotzki; United Team of Germany	13:44.6	Kazimierz Zimny; Poland	13:44.8
10,000 metres	Pyotr Bolotnikov; Soviet Union	28:32.2 (OR)	Hans Grodotzki; United Team of Germany	28:37.0	Dave Power; Australia	28:38.2
110 metres hurdles	Lee Calhoun; United States	13.8	Willie May; United States	13.8	Hayes Jones; United States	14.0
400 metres hurdles	Glenn Davis; United States	49.3 (OR)	Clifton Cushman; United States	49.6	Dick Howard; United States	49.7
3000 metres steeplechase	Zdzisław Krzyszkowiak; Poland	8:34.2 (OR)	Nikolay Sokolov; Soviet Union	8:36.4	Semyon Rzhishchin; Soviet Union	8:42.2
4 × 100 metres relay	United Team of Germany; Bernd Cullmann; Armin Hary; Walter Mahlendorf; Martin Lauer	39.5 (=WR)	Soviet Union; Gusman Kosanov; Leonid Bartenyev; Yuriy Konovalov; Edvin Ozolin	40.1	Great Britain; Peter Radford; David Jones; David Segal; Nick Whitehead	40.2
4 × 400 metres relay	United States; Jack Yerman; Earl Young; Glenn Davis; Otis Davis	3:02.2 (WR)	United Team of Germany; Hans-Joachim Reske; Manfred Kinder; Johannes Kaiser; Carl Kaufmann	3:02.7	British West Indies; Malcolm Spence; Jim Wedderburn; Keith Gardner; George Kerr	3:04.0
Marathon	Abebe Bikila; Ethiopia	2:15:16.2 (WB)	Rhadi Ben Abdesselam; Morocco	2:15:41.6	Barry Magee; New Zealand	2:17:18.2
20 kilometres walk	Volodymyr Holubnychy; Soviet Union	1:34:07.2	Noel Freeman; Australia	1:34:16.4	Stan Vickers; Great Britain	1:34.56.4
50 kilometres walk	Don Thompson; Great Britain	4:25:30.0 (OR)	John Ljunggren; Sweden	4:25:47.0	Abdon Pamich; Italy	4:27:55.4
High jump	Robert Shavlakadze; Soviet Union	2.16 m (OR)	Valeriy Brumel; Soviet Union	2.16 m (OR)	John Thomas; United States	2.14 m
Pole vault	Don Bragg; United States	4.70 m (OR)	Ron Morris; United States	4.60 m	Eeles Landström; Finland	4.55 m
Long jump	Ralph Boston; United States	8.12 m (OR)	Bo Roberson; United States	8.11 m	Igor Ter-Ovanesyan; Soviet Union	8.04 m
Triple jump	Józef Szmidt; Poland	16.81 m (OR)	Vladimir Goryaev; Soviet Union	16.63 m	Vitold Kreyer; Soviet Union	16.43 m
Shot put	Bill Nieder; United States	19.68 m (OR)	Parry O'Brien; United States	19.11 m	Dallas Long; United States	19.01 m
Discus throw	Al Oerter; United States	59.18 m (OR)	Rink Babka; United States	58.02 m	Dick Cochran; United States	57.16 m
Hammer throw	Vasily Rudenkov; Soviet Union	67.10 m (OR)	Gyula Zsivótzky; Hungary	65.79 m	Tadeusz Rut; Poland	65.64 m
Javelin throw	Viktor Tsybulenko; Soviet Union	84.64 m	Walter Krüger; United Team of Germany	79.36 m	Gergely Kulcsár; Hungary	78.57 m
Decathlon	Rafer Johnson; United States	8392 (OR)	Yang Chuan-kwang; Formosa	8334	Vasili Kuznetsov; Soviet Union	7809

=== Women ===
Event	Gold		Silver		Bronze	
100 metres	Wilma Rudolph; United States	11.0	Dorothy Hyman; Great Britain	11.3	Giuseppina Leone; Italy	11.3
200 metres	Wilma Rudolph; United States	24.0	Jutta Heine; United Team of Germany	24.4	Dorothy Hyman; Great Britain	24.7
800 metres	Lyudmila Shevtsova; Soviet Union	2:04.3 (=WR)	Brenda Jones; Australia	2:04.4	Ursula Donath; United Team of Germany	2:05.6
80 metres hurdles	Irina Press; Soviet Union	10.8	Carole Quinton; Great Britain	10.9	Gisela Birkemeyer; United Team of Germany	11.0
4 × 100 metres relay	United States; Martha Hudson; Lucinda Williams; Barbara Jones; Wilma Rudolph	44.5	United Team of Germany; Martha Langbein; Anni Biechl; Brunhilde Hendrix; Jutta Heine	44.8	Poland; Teresa Wieczorek; Barbara Janiszewska; Celina Jesionowska; Halina Richter	45.0
High jump	Iolanda Balaș; Romania	1.85 m (OR)	Jarosława Jóźwiakowska; Poland	1.71 m	none awarded as there was a tie for silver	
High jump	Iolanda Balaș; Romania	1.85 m (OR)	Dorothy Shirley; Great Britain	1.71 m	none awarded as there was a tie for silver	
Long jump	Vera Krepkina; Soviet Union	6.37 m (OR)	Elżbieta Krzesińska; Poland	6.27 m	Hildrun Claus; United Team of Germany	6.21 m
Shot put	Tamara Press; Soviet Union	17.32 m (OR)	Johanna Lüttge; United Team of Germany	16.61 m	Earlene Brown; United States	16.42 m
Discus throw	Nina Ponomaryova; Soviet Union	55.10 m (OR)	Tamara Press; Soviet Union	52.59 m	Lia Manoliu; Romania	52.36 m
Javelin throw	Elvīra Ozoliņa; Soviet Union	55.98 m (OR)	Dana Zátopková; Czechoslovakia	53.78 m	Birutė Kalėdienė; Soviet Union	53.45 m

== Medal table ==
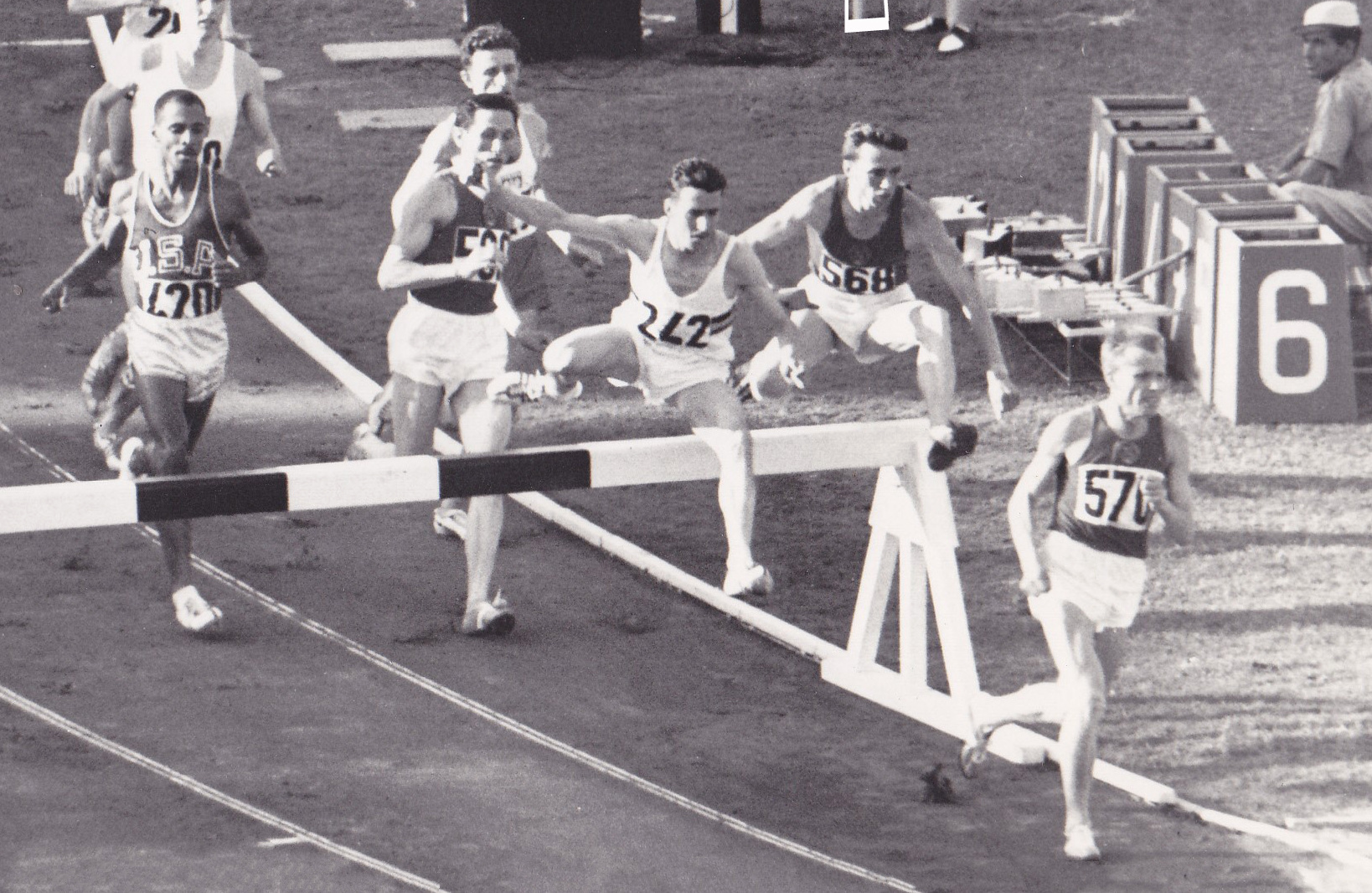
3000 m steeplechase final. Sokolov (#570, URS) is in the lead, chased by Roelants (#242, BEL), Rzhishchin (#568, URS) and Konov (URS). Jones (#420, USA) is on the left

Rank	Nation	Gold	Silver	Bronze	Total
1	United States	12	8	6	26
2	Soviet Union	11	5	5	21
3	United Team of Germany	2	8	3	13
4	Poland	2	2	3	7
5	New Zealand	2	0	1	3
6	Great Britain	1	3	4	8
7	Australia	1	2	1	4
8	Italy	1	0	2	3
9	Romania	1	0	1	2
10	Ethiopia	1	0	0	1
11	Hungary	0	1	2	3
12	France	0	1	1	2
13	Belgium	0	1	0	1
13	Czechoslovakia	0	1	0	1
13	Formosa	0	1	0	1
13	Morocco	0	1	0	1
13	Sweden	0	1	0	1
18	British West Indies	0	0	2	2
19	Finland	0	0	1	1
19	South Africa	0	0	1	1
Totals (20 entries)		34	35	33	102

== Participating nations ==
- Afghanistan (6)
- Argentina (4)
- Australia (28)
- Austria (10)
- Bahamas (3)
- Belgium (12)
- Brazil (5)
- British West Indies (8)
- Bulgaria (9)
- Burma (1)
- Canada (16)
- Ceylon (1)
- Chile (4)
- Cuba (3)
- Czechoslovakia (28)
- Denmark (9)
- Egypt (2)
- Ethiopia (6)
- Fiji (2)
- Finland (26)
- Formosa (6)
- France (36)
- United Team of Germany (91)
- Ghana (7)
- Great Britain (62)
- Greece (19)
- Guyana (4)
- Hungary (27)
- Iceland (7)
- India (12)
- Indonesia (1)
- Iran (1)
- Iraq (11)
- Ireland (9)
- Israel (8)
- Italy (47)
- Japan (20)
- Kenya (5)
- South Korea (6)
- Lebanon (1)
- Liberia (4)
- Liechtenstein (2)
- Luxembourg (6)
- Malaya (3)
- Mexico (5)
- Morocco (8)
- Netherlands (11)
- New Zealand (14)
- Nigeria (8)
- Norway (11)
- Pakistan (12)
- Panama (4)
- Philippines (7)
- Poland (52)
- Portugal (5)
- Puerto Rico (8)
- Rhodesia (3)
- Romania (9)
- Somalia (1)
- South Africa (7)
- Soviet Union (83)
- Spain (13)
- Sudan (2)
- Suriname (1)
- Sweden (28)
- Switzerland (22)
- Thailand (8)
- Tunisia (11)
- Turkey (14)
- Uganda (4)
- United States (81)
- Uruguay (1)
- Venezuela (8)
- Yugoslavia (22)

== Records broken ==
During the 1960 Summer Olympic Games, 28 new Olympic records and 4 new world records were set in the athletics events.

=== Men's Olympic and world records ===
Event	Date	Round	Name	Nationality	Result	OR	WR
100 metres	August 31	Final	Armin Hary	United Team of Germany	10.2 s	OR	
200 metres	September 3	Semi-Final	Livio Berruti	Italy	20.5 s	OR	
400 metres	September 6	Final	Otis Davis	United States	44.9 s	OR	WR
800 metres	September 2	Final	Peter Snell	New Zealand	1:46.3	OR	
1500 metres	September 6	Final	Herb Elliott	Australia	3:35.6	OR	WR
10,000 metres	September 8	Final	Pyotr Bolotnikov	Soviet Union	28:32.2	OR	
4 × 400 metres relay	September 8	Final	Jack Yerman; Earl Young; Glenn Davis; Otis Davis	United States	3:02.2	OR	WR
400 metres hurdles	September 2	Final	Glenn Davis	United States	49.3 s	OR	
3000 metres steeplechase	September 3	Final	Zdzisław Krzyszkowiak	Poland	8:34.2	OR	
Marathon	September 10	Final	Abebe Bikila	Ethiopia	2:15:16.2	OR	
50 km walk	September 7	Final	Don Thompson	Great Britain	4:25:30.0	OR	
High jump	September 3	Final	Robert Shavlakadze; Valeriy Brumel	Soviet Union	2.16 m	OR	
Long jump	September 2	Final	Ralph Boston	United States	8.12 m	OR	
Triple jump	September 6	Final	Józef Szmidt	Poland	16.81 m	OR	
Pole vault	September 7	Final	Don Bragg	United States	4.70 m	OR	
Shot put	August 31	Final	Bill Nieder	United States	19.68 m	OR	
Hammer throw	September 3	Final	Vasily Rudenkov	Soviet Union	67.10 m	OR	
Decathlon	September 6	Final	Rafer Johnson	United States	8,392 points	OR	

=== Women's Olympic and world records ===
Event	Date	Round	Name	Nationality	Result	OR	WR
100 metres	September 2	Semi-Final	Wilma Rudolph	United States	11.3 s	OR	
200 metres	September 3	First Round	Wilma Rudolph	United States	23.2 s	OR	
800 metres	September 7	Final	Lyudmila Shevtsova	Soviet Union	2:04.03	OR	
80 metres hurdles	August 31	Semi-Final	Irina Press	Soviet Union	10.6 s	OR	
4 × 100 metres relay	September 7	First Round	Martha Hudson; Lucinda Williams; Barbara Jones; Wilma Rudolph	United States	44.4 s	OR	WR
High jump	September 8	Final	Iolanda Balaş	Romania	1.85 m	OR	
Long jump	August 31	Final	Vera Krepkina	Soviet Union	6.37 m	OR	
Discus throw	September 5	Final	Nina Romashkova	Soviet Union	55.10 m	OR	
Shot put	September 2	Final	Tamara Press	Soviet Union	17.32 m	OR	
Javelin throw	September 1	Final	Elvīra Ozoliņa	Soviet Union	55.98 m	OR	
