= Athletics at the 1960 Summer Olympics – Women's 4 × 100 metres relay =

Women's 4 × 100 metres relay at the Games of the XVII Olympiad
- Venue: Olympic Stadium
- Dates: September 7, 1960 (heats); September 8, 1960 (final)

Medalists
1st place, gold medalist(s)		Martha Hudson; Lucinda Williams; Barbara Jones; Wilma Rudolph; United States
2nd place, silver medalist(s)		Martha Langbein; Anni Biechl; Brunhilde Hendrix; Jutta Heine; United Team of Germany
3rd place, bronze medalist(s)		Teresa Ciepły; Barbara Janiszewska; Celina Jesionowska; Halina Richter; Poland

The women's 4 × 100 metres relay event at the 1960 Olympic Games took place on September 7 and September 8.

== Results ==
=== Heats ===
The fastest three teams in each of the two heats advanced to the final round.

Heat one

Rank	Name	Nationality	Time	Notes
1	Carole Quinton; Dorothy Hyman; Jenny Smart; Mary Rand	Great Britain	45.92	
2	Martha Langbein; Anni Biechl; Brunhilde Hendrix; Jutta Heine	United Team of Germany	45.96	
3	Letizia Bertoni; Sandra Valenti; Piera Tizzoni; Giuseppina Leone	Italy	46.76	
4	Erzsébet Heldt; Mária Bácskai; Antónia Munkácsi; Ildikó Jónás	Hungary	47.54	
5	Nancy Lewington; Sally McCallum; Valerie Jerome; Eleanor Haslam	Canada	48.05	

Heat two

Rank	Name	Nationality	Time	Notes
1	Martha Hudson; Lucinda Williams; Barbara Jones; Wilma Rudolph	United States	44.50	WR
2	Vera Krepkina; Valentina Maslovskaya; Mariya Itkina; Irina Press	Soviet Union	45.15	
3	Teresa Ciepły; Barbara Janiszewska; Celina Jesionowska; Halina Richter	Poland	45.40	
4	Silvia Hunte; Carlota Gooden; Lorraine Dunn; Jean Holmes-Mitchell	Panama	46.66	
-	Marlene Mathews; Norma Thrower; Norma Croker; Pat Duggan	Australia	[47.59]	DQ

=== Final ===
Rank	Name	Nationality	Time	Notes
1st place, gold medalist(s)	Martha Hudson; Lucinda Williams; Barbara Jones; Wilma Rudolph	United States	44.72	
2nd place, silver medalist(s)	Martha Langbein; Anni Biechl; Brunhilde Hendrix; Jutta Heine	United Team of Germany	45.00	
3rd place, bronze medalist(s)	Teresa Ciepły; Barbara Janiszewska; Celina Jesionowska; Halina Richter	Poland	45.19	
4	Vera Krepkina; Valentina Maslovskaya; Mariya Itkina; Irina Press	Soviet Union	45.39	
5	Letizia Bertoni; Sandra Valenti; Piera Tizzoni; Giuseppina Leone	Italy	45.80	
-	Carole Quinton; Dorothy Hyman; Jenny Smart; Mary Rand	Great Britain		DNF

Key: WR = world record; DQ = disqualified; DNF = did not finish
