= Lyudmila Radchenko =

Lyudmila Radchenko may refer to:

- Liudmyla Radchenko (born 1932), Soviet-Ukrainian long jumper
- Ludmilla Radchenko (born 1978), Russian model, artist and actress
