= Wilma Rudolph =

American athlete (1940–1994)

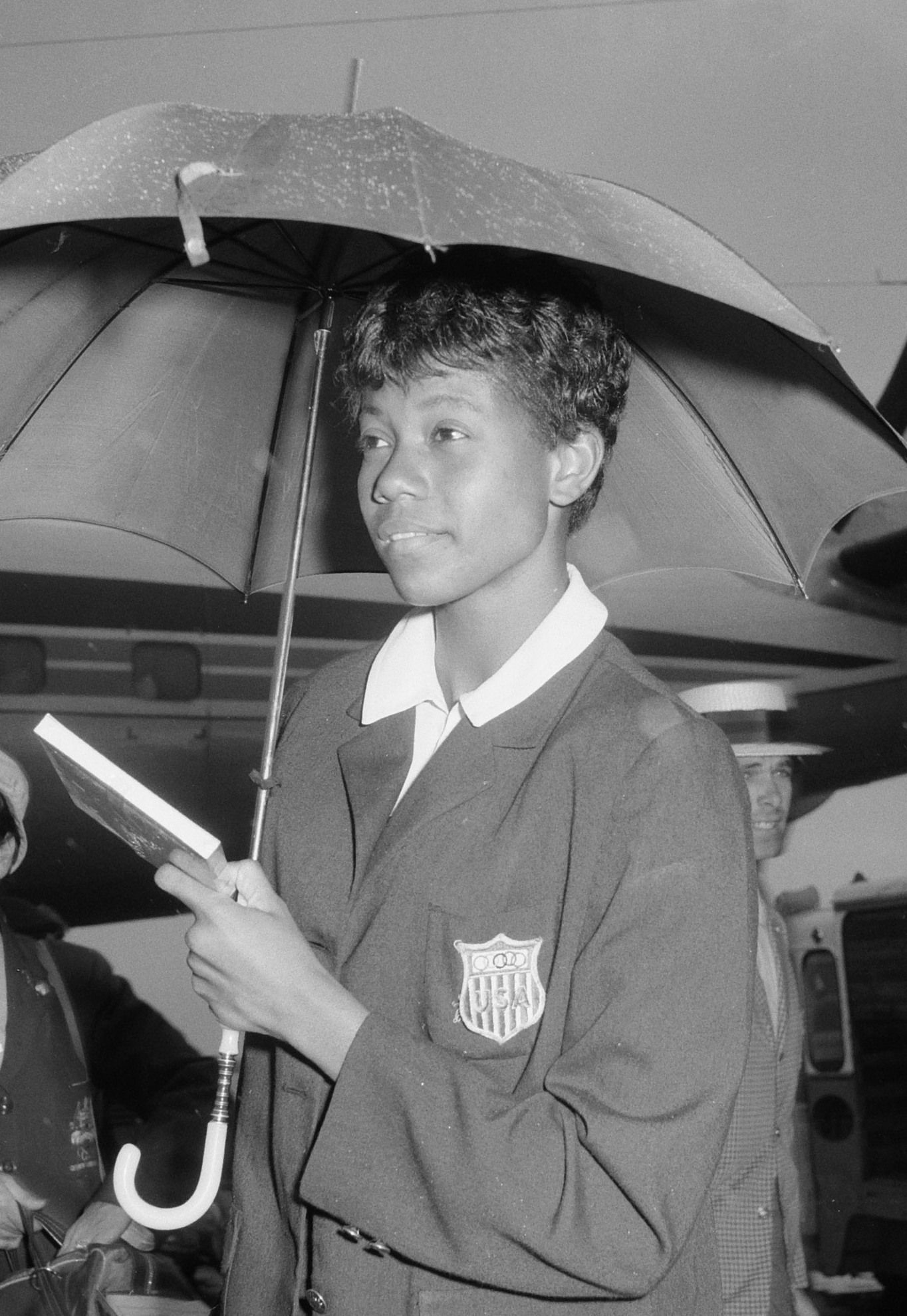
- Rudolph in 1960

Personal information
- Full name: Wilma Glodean Rudolph
- Nicknames: Skeeter; The Black Gazelle; The Tornado; The Black Pearl; The Flash; The Track Star
- Born: Wilma Glodean Rudolph; June 23, 1940 Saint Bethlehem, Tennessee, U.S.
- Died: November 12, 1994 (aged 54) Brentwood, Tennessee, U.S.
- Height: 5 ft 11 in (180 cm)
- Weight: 130 lb (59 kg)

Sport
- Country: United States
- Sport: Track and field
- Club: TSU Tigerbelles, Nashville
- Retired: 1962

Achievements and titles
- Olympic finals: 1956 Summer Olympics; 1960 Summer Olympics
- Personal bests: 100 m: 11.0h (Rome, Italy, September 2, 1960; Olympic final, wind-assisted +2.8 m/s); 200 m: 22.9h (Corpus Christi, Texas, USA, July 9, 1960; wind-assisted +1.4 m/s); 4×100 m relay: 44.3h (Moscow, USSR, July 15, 1961; wind-assisted); 60-yard dash: 6.9 (Los Angeles, USA, January 22, 1961; World Indoor Record)
Medal record
Women's athletics
Representing the United States
Olympic Games
Gold medal – first place	1960 Rome	100 m
Gold medal – first place	1960 Rome	200 m
Gold medal – first place	1960 Rome	4 × 100 m relay
Bronze medal – third place	1956 Melbourne	4 × 100 m relay

Wilma Glodean Rudolph (June 23, 1940 – November 12, 1994) was an American sprinter who overcame polio as a child and went on to become a world-record-holding Olympic champion and international sports icon in track and field following her successes in the 1956 and 1960 Olympic Games. Rudolph competed in the 200-meter dash and won a bronze medal in the 4 × 100-meter relay at the 1956 Summer Olympics at Melbourne, Australia. She also won three gold medals, in the 100- and 200-meter individual events and the 4 × 100-meter relay at the 1960 Summer Olympics in Rome, Italy. Rudolph was acclaimed as the fastest woman in the world in the 1960s; she became the first American woman to win three gold medals in track and field during a single Olympic Games.

With the worldwide television coverage of the 1960 Summer Olympics, Rudolph became an international star, along with other Olympic athletes such as Cassius Clay (later known as Muhammad Ali), Oscar Robertson, and Rafer Johnson.

As an Olympic champion in the early 1960s, Rudolph was among the most highly visible black women in America and abroad. She became a role model for black and female athletes; her Olympic successes helped elevate women's track and field in the United States. Rudolph is also regarded as a civil rights and women's rights pioneer. In 1962, Rudolph retired from competition at the peak of her athletic career as the world record-holder in the 100- and 200-meter individual events and the 4 × 100-meter relays. After competing in the 1960 Summer Olympics, the 1963 graduate of Tennessee State University became an educator and coach. Rudolph died of brain and throat cancer in 1994, and her achievements are memorialized in a variety of tributes, including a U.S. postage stamp, documentary films, and a made-for-television movie, as well as in numerous publications, especially books for young readers.

== Early life and education ==
Wilma Rudolph was born prematurely to Blanche Rudolph at 4.5 pounds (2.0 kg) on June 23, 1940, in Saint Bethlehem, Tennessee (now part of Clarksville). She was the 20th of 22 children from her father Ed Rudolph's two marriages. Shortly after Wilma's birth, her family moved to Clarksville, Tennessee, where she grew up and attended elementary and high school. Ed, who worked as a railway porter and did odd jobs in Clarksville, died in 1961; her mother, Blanche, worked as a maid in Clarksville homes and died in 1994.

Rudolph had several early childhood illnesses, including pneumonia and scarlet fever, and she contracted infantile paralysis (caused by the poliovirus) at age five. Rudolph recovered from polio but lost strength in her left leg and foot. Physically disabled for much of her early life, Rudolph wore a leg brace until she was 12 years old. Because there was little medical care available to African American residents of Clarksville in the 1940s, Rudolph's parents sought treatment for her at the historically black Meharry Medical College (now Nashville General Hospital at Meharry) in Nashville, Tennessee, about 50 miles (80 km) from Clarksville.

For two years, Rudolph and her mother made weekly bus trips to Nashville for treatments to regain the use of her weakened leg. Rudolph also received subsequent at-home massage treatments four times a day from members of her family and wore an orthopedic shoe for support of her foot for another two years. Because of the treatments she received at Meharry and the daily massages from her family members, Rudolph was able to overcome the debilitating effects of polio and learned to walk without a leg brace or orthopedic shoe for support by the time she was 12 years old.

Rudolph was initially homeschooled due to the frequent illnesses that caused her to miss kindergarten and first grade. Rudolph began attending second grade at Cobb Elementary School in Clarksville in 1947 at age seven. She attended Clarksville's all-black Burt High School, where Rudolph excelled in basketball and track. During her senior year of high school, Rudolph became pregnant with her first child, Yolanda, who was born in 1958, a few weeks before her enrollment at Tennessee State University in Nashville. In college, Rudolph continued to compete in track. She also became a member of the Delta Sigma Theta sorority. In 1963, Rudolph graduated from Tennessee State with a bachelor's degree in education. Her college education was paid by her participation in a work-study scholarship program that required Rudolph to work on the TSU campus for two hours a day.

== Career ==
=== Early years ===
Rudolph was first introduced to organized sports at Burt High School, the center of Clarksville's African American community. After completing several years of medical treatments to regain the use of her left leg, Rudolph chose to follow in her sister Yvonne's footsteps and began playing basketball in the eighth grade. Rudolph continued to play basketball in high school, where she became a starter on the team and began competing in track. In her sophomore year, Rudolph scored 803 points and set a new record for high school girls' basketball. Rudolph's high school coach, C. C. Gray, gave her the nickname of "Skeeter" (for mosquito) because she moved so fast.

While playing for her high school basketball team, Rudolph was spotted by Ed Temple, Tennessee State's track and field coach, a major break for the active young athlete. The day that Temple saw the tenth grader for the first time, he knew Rudolph was a natural athlete. She had already gained some track experience on Burt High School's track team two years earlier, mostly as a way to keep busy between basketball seasons. As a high school sophomore, Rudolph competed at Alabama's Tuskegee Institute in her first major track event. Although she lost the race, Rudolph was determined to continue competing and win.

Temple invited 14-year-old Rudolph to join his summer training program at Tennessee State. After attending the track camp, Rudolph won all nine events she entered at an Amateur Athletic Union track meet in Philadelphia, Pennsylvania. Under Temple's guidance, she continued to train regularly at TSU while still a high school student. Rudolph raced at amateur athletic events with TSU's women's track team, known as the Tigerbelles, for two more years before enrolling at TSU as a student in 1958.

=== 1956 Summer Olympics ===
When Rudolph was 16 and a junior in high school, she attended the 1956 U.S. Olympic track and field team trials in Seattle, Washington, and qualified to compete in the 200-meter individual event at the 1956 Summer Olympics in Melbourne, Australia. Rudolph, the youngest member of the U.S. Olympic team, was one of five TSU Tigerbelles to qualify for the 1956 Melbourne Olympics.

Rudolph was defeated in a preliminary heat of the 200-meter race at the Melbourne Olympic Games but ran the third leg of the 4 × 100 m relay. The American team of Rudolph, Isabelle Daniels, Mae Faggs, and Margaret Matthews, all of whom were TSU Tigerbelles, won the bronze medal, matching the world-record time of 44.9 seconds. The British team won the silver medal. The Australian team, with the 100- and 200-meter gold medalist Betty Cuthbert as their anchor leg, won the gold medal in a time of 44.5 seconds. After Rudolph returned to her Tennessee home from the Melbourne Olympic Games, Rudolph showed her high school classmates the bronze medal that she had won and decided to try to win a gold medal at the 1960 Summer Olympics in Rome, Italy.

In 1958, Rudolph enrolled at Tennessee State, where Temple continued as her track coach. At the Pan American Games in Chicago, Illinois the following year, Rudolph won a silver medal in the 100-meter individual event, as well as a gold medal in the 4 × 100-meter relay with teammates Isabelle Dan, Barbara Joe, and Lucinda Williams. She also won the AAU 200-meter title in 1959 and defended it for four consecutive years. During her career, Rudolph also won three AAU indoor titles.

=== 1960 Summer Olympics ===
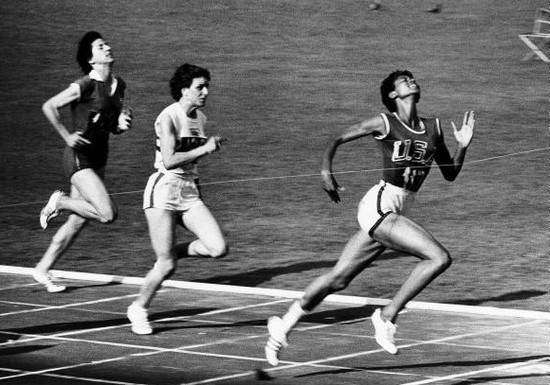
Rudolph wins the women's 100-meter dash at the 1960 Summer Olympics in Rome.

While she was still a sophomore at Tennessee State, Rudolph competed in the U.S. Olympic track and field trials at Abilene Christian University in Abilene, Texas, where she set a world record in the 200-meter dash that stood for eight years. Rudolph also qualified for the 1960 Summer Olympics in the 100-meter dash.

At the 1960 Summer Olympics in Rome, Italy, Rudolph competed in three events on a cinder track in Rome's Stadio Olimpico: the 100- and 200-meter sprints, as well as the 4 × 100-meter relay. Rudolph, who won a gold medal in each of these events, became the first American woman to win three gold medals in a single Olympiad.

Rudolph ran the finals in the 100-meter dash in a wind-aided time of 11.0 seconds. (The record-setting time was not credited as a world record, because the wind, at 2.75 metres (3.01 yd) per second, exceeded the maximum of 2 metres (2.2 yd).) Rudolph became the first American woman to win a gold medal in the 100-meter race since Helen Stephens did so in the 1936 Summer Olympics. Rudolph won another gold medal in the finals of the 200-meter dash with a time of 24.0 seconds, after setting a new Olympic record of 23.2 seconds in the opening heat. After these wins, she was hailed throughout the world as "the fastest woman in history."

On September 7, 1960, the temperature climbed toward 40 °C (104 °F) as thousands of spectators jammed the stadium. Rudolph combined efforts with her Olympic teammates from Tennessee State—Martha Hudson, Lucinda Williams, and Barbara Jones—to win the 4 × 100-meter relays with a time of 44.5 seconds, after setting a world record of 44.4 seconds in the semifinals. Rudolph ran the anchor leg for the American team in the finals and nearly dropped the baton after a pass from Williams, but she overtook Germany's anchor leg to win the relay in a close finish. Rudolph had a special, personal reason to hope for victory—to pay tribute to Jesse Owens, the celebrated American athlete and star of the 1936 Summer Olympics in Berlin, Germany, who had been her inspiration.

Rudolph was one of the most popular athletes of the 1960 Rome Olympics and emerged from the Olympic Games as "The Tornado, the fastest woman on earth." The Italians nicknamed her "La Gazzella Nera" ("The Black Gazelle"). The French called her "La Perle Noire" ("The Black Pearl"), as well as "La Chattanooga Choo-Choo." Along with other 1960 Olympic athletes such as Cassius Clay (later known as Muhammad Ali), Oscar Robertson, and Rafer Johnson, Rudolph became an international star due to the first worldwide television coverage of the Olympics that year. The 1960 Rome Olympics launched her into the public spotlight and the media cast her as America's athletic "leading lady" and a "queen," with praises of Rudolph's athletic accomplishments as well as her feminine beauty and poise.

=== Post-Olympic career ===
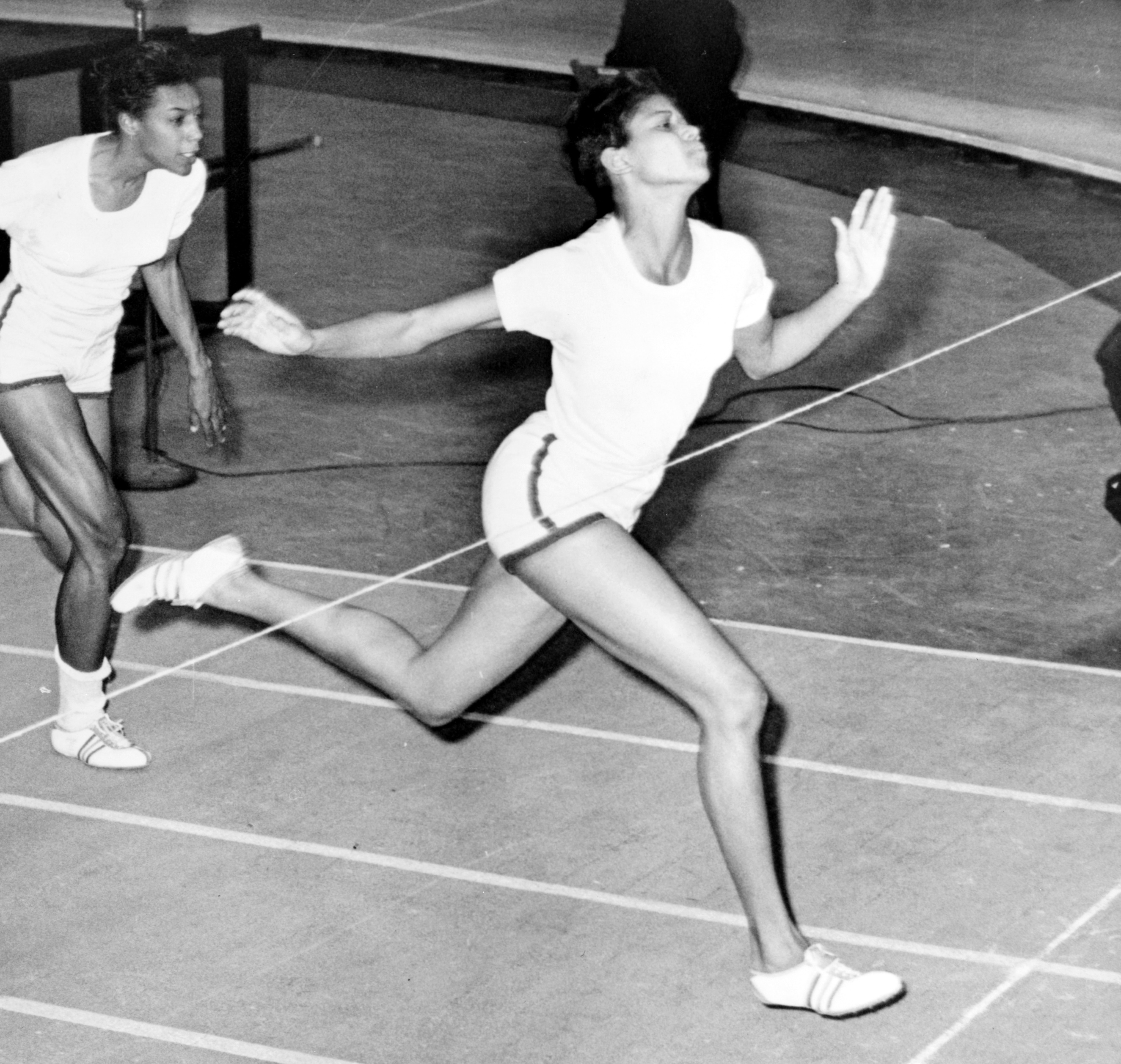
Rudolph at the finish line during the 50-yard dash at the track meet at Madison Square Garden in 1961

Rudolph returned home to Clarksville after completing a post-games European tour, where she and her Olympic teammates competed in meets in London, West Germany, the Netherlands, and at other venues in Europe. Rudolph's hometown of Clarksville celebrated "Welcome Wilma Day" on October 4, 1960, with a full day of festivities. Governor Buford Ellington had created these plans to welcome Rudolph home with a parade. Ellington was elected because he had old fashioned segregationist beliefs. This was the complete opposite of what Rudolph stood for. Rudolph heard this and refused to attend her own celebration because of it being segregated. Due to the concern of Rudolph not attending her own event, the parade was changed to be integrated. She made everlasting history by standing up for what she believed in as this parade marked the first ever integrated event in her hometown of Clarksville, Tennessee. An estimated 1,100 attended the banquet in Rudolph's honor and thousands lined the city streets to watch the parade.

Rudolph's gold-medal victories in Rome also "propelled her to become one of the most highly visible black women across the United States and around the world." Her Olympic star status also "gave an enormous boost to the indoor track circuit in the months following the Olympic Games in Rome." In 1961, Rudolph competed in the prestigious, Los Angeles Invitational indoor track meet, where thousands turned out to watch her run. Besides this event, Rudolph was invited to compete in New York Athletic Club track events and became the first woman invited to compete at the Millrose Games. She was also invited to compete at the Penn Relays and the Drake Relays, among others.

Following Rudolph's Olympic victories, the United States Information Agency made a 10-minute documentary film, Wilma Rudolph: Olympic Champion (1961), to highlight her accomplishments on the track. Rudolph's appearance in 1960 on To Tell the Truth, an American television game show, and later as a guest on The Ed Sullivan Show also helped promote her status as an iconic sports star.

In 1961, Rudolph married William Ward, a North Carolina College at Durham track team member; they divorced in 1963. In the interim, Rudolph retired from track competition at age 22, following victories in the 100-meter and 4 × 100-meter-relay races at the U.S.–Soviet meet at Stanford University in 1962. At the time of her retirement, Rudolph was still the world record-holder in the 100-meter (11.2 seconds set on July 19, 1961), 200-meter (22.9 seconds set on July 9, 1960), and 4 × 100-meter-relay events. She had also won seven national AAU sprint titles and set the women's indoor track record of 6.9 seconds in the 60-yard dash. As Rudolph explained it, she retired at the peak of her athletic career because Rudolph wanted to leave the sport while still at her best. As such, Rudolph did not compete at the 1964 Summer Olympic Games in Tokyo, Japan, saying, "If I won two gold medals, there would be something lacking. I'll stick with the glory I've already won like Jesse Owens did in 1936."

After retiring from competition, Rudolph continued her education at Tennessee State and earned a bachelor's degree in elementary education in 1963. That same year, she made a month-long trip to West Africa as a goodwill ambassador for the U.S State Department. Rudolph served as U.S. representative to the 1963 Friendship Games in Dakar, Senegal, and visited Ghana, Guinea, Mali, and Upper Volta, where she attended sporting events, visited schools, and made guest appearances on television and radio broadcasts. Rudolph also attended the premiere of the U.S. Information Agency's documentary film that highlighted her track career.

In May 1963, a few weeks after returning from Africa, Rudolph participated in a civil rights protest in her hometown of Clarksville to desegregate one of the city's restaurants. Within a short time, the mayor announced that the city's public facilities, including its restaurants, would become fully integrated. Rudolph also married Robert Eldridge, who had fathered her child when she was in high school, later that year. The couple had three additional children, but divorced after 17 years of marriage.

== Later years ==
Rudolph did not earn significant money as an amateur athlete and shifted to a career in teaching and coaching after her retirement from track competition. She began as a second-grade teacher at Cobb Elementary School, which Rudolph had attended as a child, and coached track at Burt High School, where she had once been a student-athlete herself.

Rudolph moved several times over the years and lived in various places such as Chicago, Illinois; Indianapolis, Indiana; St. Louis, Missouri; Detroit, Michigan; Tennessee; California; and Maine.

Rudolph's autobiography, Wilma: The Story of Wilma Rudolph, was published in 1977. It served as the basis for several other publications and films. By 2014, at least 21 books on Rudolph's life have been published for children, from pre-school youth to high school students.

In addition to teaching, Rudolph worked for nonprofit organizations and government-sponsored projects that supported athletic development among American children. In Boston, Massachusetts, she became involved in the federal Job Corps program, and Rudolph served as a track specialist for Operation Champion in 1967. In 1981, Rudolph established and led the Wilma Rudolph Foundation, a nonprofit organization based in Indianapolis, Indiana, that trains youth athletes. Six years later, she joined DePauw University in Greencastle, Indiana, as director of its women's track program and served as a consultant on minority affairs to the university's president.

Rudolph went on to host a local television show in Indianapolis. She was also a publicist for Universal Studios as well as a television sports commentator for ABC Sports during the 1984 Summer Olympics in Los Angeles, California, and lit the cauldron to open the Pan American Games in Indianapolis in 1987 in front of 80,000 spectators at the Indianapolis Motor Speedway. In 1992, two years before her untimely death, Rudolph became a vice president at Nashville's Baptist Hospital.

== Marriage and family ==
Rudolph dated boxing legend Muhammad Ali during the early 1960s. She was married twice, with both marriages ending in divorce. On October 14, 1961, Rudolph married William "Willie" Ward, a member of the North Carolina College at Durham track team. They divorced in May 1963. After her graduation from Tennessee State in 1963, Rudolph married Robert Eldridge, her high school sweetheart, with whom she already had a daughter, Yolanda, born in 1958. Rudolph and Eldridge had four children: two daughters (Yolanda, born in 1958, and Djuanna, born in 1964) and two sons (Robert Jr., born in 1965, and Xurry, born in 1971 and died in 2025). They divorced in 1980.

== Death and legacy ==
In July 1994 (shortly after her mother's death), Rudolph was diagnosed with brain cancer. She also had been diagnosed with throat cancer. Her condition deteriorated rapidly, and Rudolph died on November 12, 1994, at her home in Brentwood, a suburb of Nashville, Tennessee; she was only 54 years old.

Rudolph's legacy lies in her efforts to overcome obstacles that included childhood illnesses and a physical disability to become the fastest woman runner in the world in 1960. At the 1960 Rome Olympics, Rudolph became the first American woman to win three gold medals in a single Olympiad. Rudolph was one of the first role models for black and female athletes. Her Olympic success "gave a tremendous boost to women's track in the United States." Rudolph's celebrity also caused gender barriers to be broken at previously all-male track and field events such as the Millrose Games.

In addition to her athletic accomplishments, Rudolph is remembered for her contributions to youth, including founding and heading the Wilma Rudolph Foundation, which trains youth athletes. Her life is remembered in numerous publications, especially books for young readers. Rudolph's life has been featured in documentary films and made-for-television movies too:

- Walter de Hoog directed Wilma Rudolph: Olympic Champion (1961), the United States Information Agency's ten-minute film documentary of her accomplishments on the track.
- In 1977, Bud Greenspan produced Wilma (also known as The Story of Wilma Rudolph), a made-for-television docudrama adaptation of her autobiography starring Shirley Jo Finney as Rudolph and costarring Cicely Tyson, Jason Bernard, and Denzel Washington in one of his first roles.
- In 2015, Positive Edge Education Ltd. commissioned Pixel Revolution Films, a United Kingdom-based film company, to produce three short inspiration dramas to be screened in schools, including one about Rudolph's life. Unlimited (2015) was written and directed by Ian and Dominic Higgins.
- A children's book on her life was distributed by McDonald's in 2025–26.

== Awards and honors ==
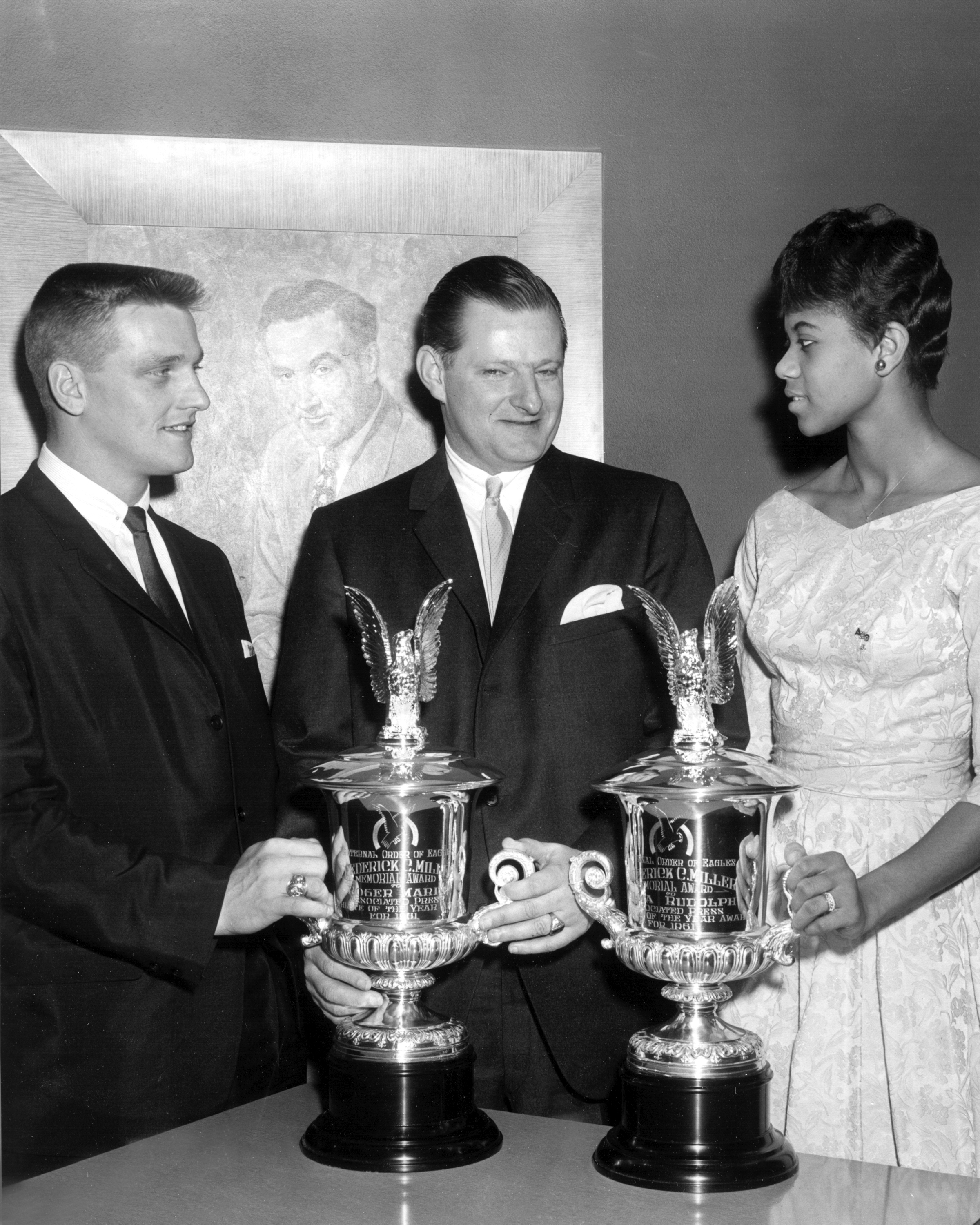
Rudolph receiving a Fraternal Order of Eagles Award with Roger Maris (left)

Rudolph was named United Press International Athlete of the Year (1960) and Associated Press Woman Athlete of the Year (1960 and 1961). She was also the recipient of the James E. Sullivan Award (1960) for the top amateur athlete in the United States and the Babe Didrikson Zaharias Award (1962). In addition, Rudolph had a private meeting with President John F. Kennedy in the Oval Office. Rudolph was also honored with the National Sports Award (1993).

Rudolph was inducted into several women's and sports halls of fame:

- Black Sports Hall of Fame (1973)
- U.S. National Track and Field Hall of Fame (1974)
- U.S. Olympic Hall of Fame (1983)
- National Women's Hall of Fame (1994)
- National Black Sports and Entertainment Hall of Fame (2001)

In 1984, the Women's Sports Foundation selected Rudolph as one of the five greatest women athletes in the United States. In 1996, the foundation presented its first Wilma Rudolph Courage Award to Jackie Joyner-Kersee.

In 1994, a portion of U.S. Route 79 was named Wilma Rudolph Boulevard, extending from Interstate 24, exit 4, in Clarksville to the Red River (Lynnwood-Tarpley) bridge near the Kraft Street intersection. On November 21, 1995, the Wilma Rudolph Memorial Commission placed a black marble marker at her grave site in Edgefield Missionary Baptist Church. In April 1996, a life-size bronze statue of Rudolph was erected "at the southern end of the Cumberland River Walk at the base of the Pedestrian Overpass" at College Street and Riverside Drive in Clarksville.

In 2012, the city of Clarksville, Tennessee built the Wilma Rudolph Event Center, located at Liberty Park on Cumberland Drive. The life-size bronze statue was moved there from its previous location at Riverside Drive, and stands near the entrance of the building.

On December 2, 1980, Tennessee State University named its indoor track in Rudolph's honor. On August 11, 1995 (nine months after Rudolph's death), Tennessee State University dedicated a new, six-story dormitory as the Wilma G. Rudolph Residence Center. The building, which includes a computer lab, beauty salon, and cafeteria, houses upper class and graduate women. In 1997, Governor Don Sundquist proclaimed June 23 as "Wilma Rudolph Day" in Tennessee.

The December 29, 1999, issue of Sports Illustrated ranked Rudolph first on its list of the top 50 greatest sports figures of the twentieth-century from Tennessee. ESPN ranked Rudolph forty-first in its listing of the twentieth century's greatest athletes.

Following the withdrawal of U.S. troops from Berlin in 1994, Berlin American High School (BAHS) was turned over to the people of Berlin and became the "Gesamtschule Am Hegewinkel". The school was renamed the "Wilma Rudolph Oberschule" in her honor in the summer of 2000.

On July 14, 2004, the U.S. Postal Service issued a 23-cent postage stamp, the fifth in its Distinguished Americans series, in recognition of Rudolph's accomplishments.
