= Piera Tizzoni =

Italian long jumper and sprinter

Personal information
- Nationality: Italian
- Born: February 14, 1940 (age 86) Turin, Italy
- Height: 1.60 m (5 ft 3 in)
- Weight: 53 kg (117 lb)

Sport
- Country: Italy
- Sport: Athletics
- Events: Long jump Sprint

Achievements and titles
- Personal bests: 100 m: 12.1 (1959); Long jump: 5.91 m (1959)

Piera Tizzoni (born 14 February 1940, in Turin) is a former Italian long jumper.

== Biography ==
Piera Tizzoni participated at one edition of the Summer Olympics (1960), she has 5 caps in national team from 1958 to 1960.

== Achievements ==
Year	Competition	Venue	Position	Event	Performance	Note
1960	Olympic Games	(Italy) Rome	21st	Long jump	5.65 m	
1960	Olympic Games	(Italy) Rome	5th	4 × 100 m relay	45.80	

== National titles ==
Piera Tizzoni has won the individual national championship eight times.

- 2 wins on long jump (1959, 1960)

== See also ==
- Italian record progression women's long jump
- Italy national relay team
