= Athletics at the 1960 Summer Olympics – Women's 100 metres =

Women's 100 metres at the Games of the XVII Olympiad
- Venue: Olympic Stadium
- Dates: September 1, 1960 (heats and quarterfinals); September 2, 1960 (semifinals and final)

Medalists
1st place, gold medalist(s)		Wilma Rudolph; United States
2nd place, silver medalist(s)		Dorothy Hyman; Great Britain
3rd place, bronze medalist(s)		Giuseppina Leone; Italy

Official Video Highlights

The women's 100 metres sprint event at the 1960 Olympic Games took place between September 1 and September 2.

== Results ==
=== Heats ===
The fastest four runners in each of the seven heats advanced to the quarterfinal round.

==== Heat 1 ====
Rank	Athlete	Nation	Time	Notes
1	Giuseppina Leone	Italy	11.87	Q
2	Barbara Jones	United States	11.91	Q
3	Eleanor Haslam	Canada	12.21	Q
4	Elizabeth Jenner	Great Britain	12.39	Q
	Ulla Flegel	Austria	DNS	

==== Heat 2 ====
Rank	Athlete	Nation	Time	Notes
1	Pat Duggan	Australia	12.18	Q
2	Mona Sulaiman	Philippines	12.40	Q
3	Vivi Markussen	Denmark	12.53	Q
4	Nancy Lewington	Canada	12.67	Q
	Erzsébet Heldt	Hungary	DNS	
	Irina Press	Soviet Union	DNS	

==== Heat 3 ====
Rank	Athlete	Nation	Time	Notes
1	Mariya Itkina	Soviet Union	11.83	Q
2	Marlene Mathews-Willard	Australia	12.10	Q
3	Olga Šikovec	Yugoslavia	12.24	Q
4	Carlota Gooden	Panama	12.36	Q
	Antónia Munkácsi	Hungary	DNS	

==== Heat 4 ====
Rank	Athlete	Nation	Time	Notes
1	Jenny Smart	Great Britain	12.04	Q
2	Betty Cuthbert	Australia	12.21	Q
3	Valerie Morgan	New Zealand	12.61	Q
4	Snezhana Kerkova	Bulgaria	12.66	Q
	Alena Stolzová	Czechoslovakia	DNS	

==== Heat 5 ====
Rank	Athlete	Nation	Time	Notes
1	Dorothy Hyman	Great Britain	11.98	Q
2	Gisela Köhler-Birkemeyer	United Team of Germany	12.31	Q
3	Jean Holmes-Mitchell	Panama	12.52	Q
4	Valerie Jerome	Canada	12.58	Q
5	Maeve Kyle	Ireland	12.59	
6	Ilana Adir	Israel	13.04	

==== Heat 6 ====
Rank	Athlete	Nation	Time	Notes
1	Wilma Rudolph	United States	11.65	Q
2	Catherine Capdevielle	France	11.94	Q
3	Halina Richter-Górecka-Herrmann	Poland	12.13	Q
4	Hannelore Raepke	United Team of Germany	12.45	Q
	Siloo Mystri	India	DNS	

==== Heat 7 ====
Rank	Athlete	Nation	Time	Notes
1	Vera Kalashnikova-Krepkina	Soviet Union	11.97	Q
2	Brunhilde Hendrix	United Team of Germany	11.99	Q
3	Teresa Ciepły-Wieczorek	Poland	12.25	Q
4	Martha Hudson	United States	12.33	Q
5	Aycan Önel	Turkey	13.59	

=== Quarterfinals ===
The fastest three runners in each of the four heats advanced to the semifinal round.

==== Quarterfinal 1 ====
Rank	Athlete	Nation	Time	Notes
1	Wilma Rudolph	United States	11.70	Q
2	Vera Kalashnikova-Krepkina	Soviet Union	12.14	Q
3	Marlene Mathews-Willard	Australia	12.25	Q
4	Gisela Köhler-Birkemeyer	United Team of Germany	12.26	
5	Eleanor Haslam	Canada	12.46	
6	Mona Sulaiman	Philippines	12.54	
7	Valerie Morgan	New Zealand	12.66	

==== Quarterfinal 2 ====
Rank	Athlete	Nation	Time	Notes
1	Mariya Itkina	Soviet Union	11.88	Q
2	Brunhilde Hendrix	United Team of Germany	12.02	Q
3	Halina Richter-Górecka-Herrmann	Poland	12.10	Q
4	Pat Duggan	Australia	12.32	
5	Jean Holmes-Mitchell	Panama	12.39	
6	Elizabeth Jenner	Great Britain	12.50	
7	Snezhana Kerkova	Bulgaria	12.80	

==== Quarterfinal 3 ====
Rank	Athlete	Nation	Time	Notes
1	Giuseppina Leone	Italy	12.11	Q
2	Catherine Capdevielle	France	12.16	Q
3	Jenny Smart	Great Britain	12.17	Q
4	Martha Hudson	United States	12.30	
5	Olga Šikovec	Yugoslavia	12.61	
6	Carlota Gooden	Panama	12.70	
7	Nancy Lewington	Canada	13.23	

==== Quarterfinal 4 ====
Rank	Athlete	Nation	Time	Notes
1	Dorothy Hyman	Great Britain	11.77	Q
2	Barbara Jones	United States	12.02	Q
3	Teresa Ciepły-Wieczorek	Poland	12.14	Q
4	Betty Cuthbert	Australia	12.18	
5	Valerie Jerome	Canada	12.50	
6	Vivi Markussen	Denmark	12.56	
	Hannelore Raepke	United Team of Germany	DNS	

=== Semifinals ===
The fastest three runners in each of the two heats advanced to the final round.

==== Semifinal 1 ====
Rank	Athlete	Nation	Time	Notes
1	Wilma Rudolph	United States	11.41	Q, =WR
2	Giuseppina Leone	Italy	11.71	Q
3	Jenny Smart	Great Britain	11.89	Q
4	Halina Richter-Górecka-Herrmann	Poland	11.93	
5	Brunhilde Hendrix	United Team of Germany	11.99	
6	Vera Kalashnikova-Krepkina	Soviet Union	12.08	

==== Semifinal 2 ====
Rank	Athlete	Nation	Time	Notes
1	Dorothy Hyman	Great Britain	11.65	Q
2	Mariya Itkina	Soviet Union	11.78	Q
3	Catherine Capdevielle	France	11.82	Q
4	Barbara Jones	United States	11.84	
5	Teresa Ciepły-Wieczorek	Poland	12.05	
6	Marlene Mathews-Willard	Australia	12.05	

=== Final ===
Wind = 2.8 m/s.
Wind was over the allotted speed. All times in the finals were considered wind assisted and therefore were not counted toward world or Olympic records.

Rank	Athlete	Nation	Time
1st place, gold medalist(s)	Wilma Rudolph	United States	11.18
2nd place, silver medalist(s)	Dorothy Hyman	Great Britain	11.43
3rd place, bronze medalist(s)	Giuseppina Leone	Italy	11.48
4	Mariya Itkina	Soviet Union	11.54
5	Catherine Capdevielle	France	11.64
6	Jenny Smart	Great Britain	11.72
