= Sandra Valenti =

Italian sprinter

Personal information
- Nationality: Italian
- Born: November 27, 1939 Rome, Italy
- Died: 5 February 2005 (aged 65) Rome, Italy
- Height: 1.74 m (5 ft 8 1/2 in)
- Weight: 63 kg (139 lb)

Sport
- Country: Italy
- Sport: Athletics
- Event: Sprint
- Club: Club Atletico Centrale

Achievements and titles
- Personal best: 100 m: 11.9 (1958)

Sandra Valenti (27 November 1939 – 5 February 2005) was an Italian sprinter. She was born in Rome.

== Biography ==
Valenti participated in one edition of the Summer Olympics (1960). She earned 10 caps with the national team from 1955 to 1960.

== Achievements ==
Year	Competition	Venue	Position	Event	Performance	Note
1960	Olympic Games	(Italy) Rome	5th	4 × 100 m relay	45.80	

== See also ==
- Italy national relay team
