= Yasuko Kimura =

Japanese long jumper (born 1937)

Personal information
- Nationality: Japanese
- Born: 19 November 1937 (age 88)

Sport
- Sport: Athletics
- Event: Long jump

Yasuko Kimura (木村 安子, Kimura Yasuko; born 19 November 1937) is a Japanese athlete. She competed in the women's long jump at the 1960 Summer Olympics.
