= Ilana Adir =

Israeli sprinter

Ilana Adir (-Kamarshik) אילנה אדיר-קמרשיק
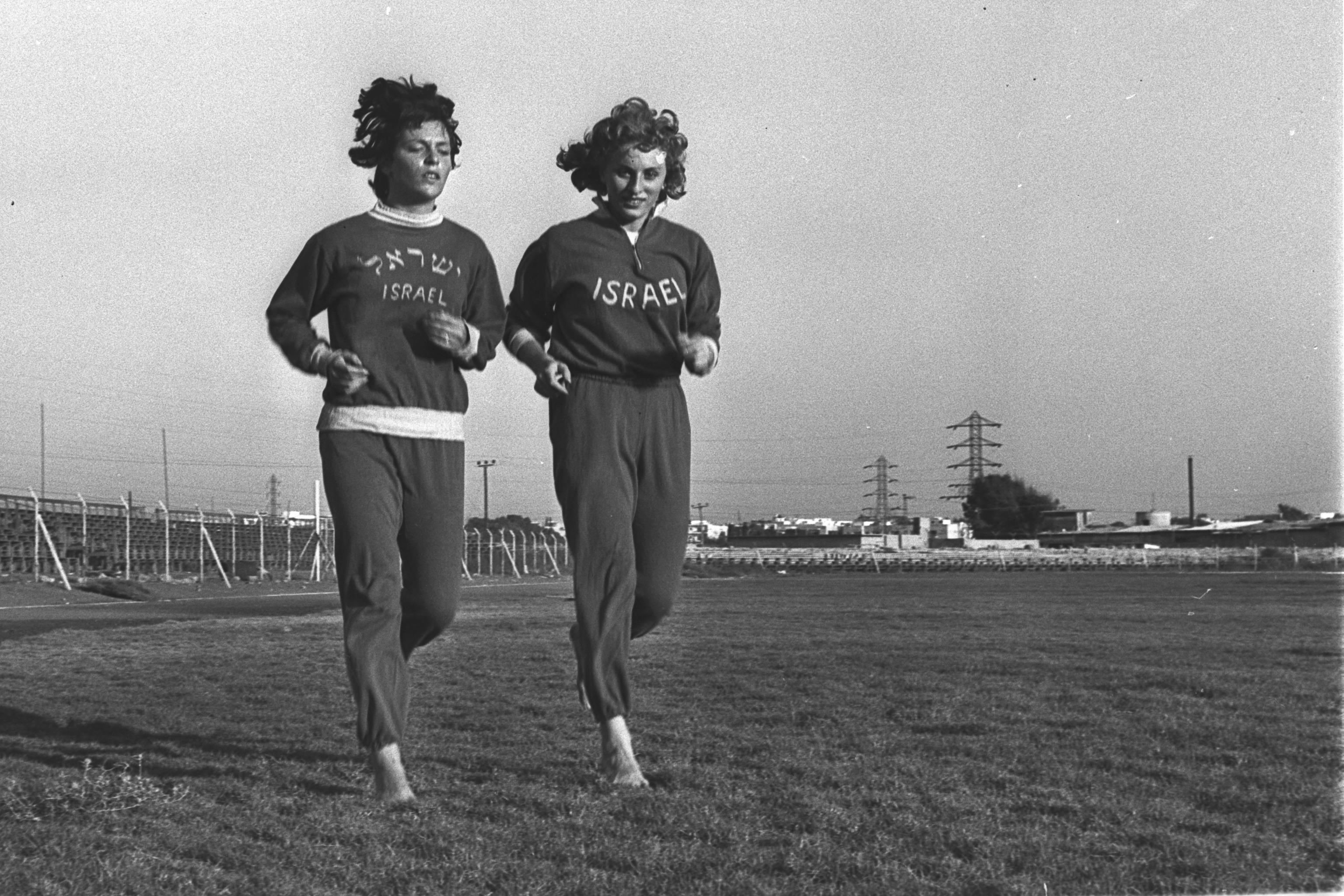
- Ilana Adir (left), prepares to compete in the 1960 Olympics with Ilana Karaszyk (right)

Personal information
- Born: 28 June 1941 (age 85) Tel Aviv, Mandatory Palestine
- Height: 5 ft 4.5 in (164 cm)
- Weight: 128 lb (58 kg)

Sport
- Country: Israel
- Sport: Athletics
- Event: 100 metres

Achievements and titles
- National finals: Israeli Champion in 100 metres (1960)
- Personal best: 100 m: 12.3 (1960)

Ilana Adir (-Kamarshik; Hebrew: אילנה אדיר-קמרשיק; born 28 June 1941) is an Israeli former Olympic sprinter, and former Israeli Women's Champion in the 100 metre sprint.

Adir was born in Tel Aviv and is Jewish.

== Sprinting career ==
Her personal best in the 100 metres was 12.3 in 1960. That year she was Israeli Women's Champion in the 100 metres, with a time of 12.4.

Adir competed for Israel at the 1960 Summer Olympics in Rome, Italy, at the age of 19. In the Women's 100 metres she came in 6th in Heat 5, with a time of 12.9. When she competed in the Olympics, she was 5 ft 4.5 in (164 cm) and weighed 128 lb (58 kg).
