= Ralli Ben-Yehuda =

Israeli artistic gymnast

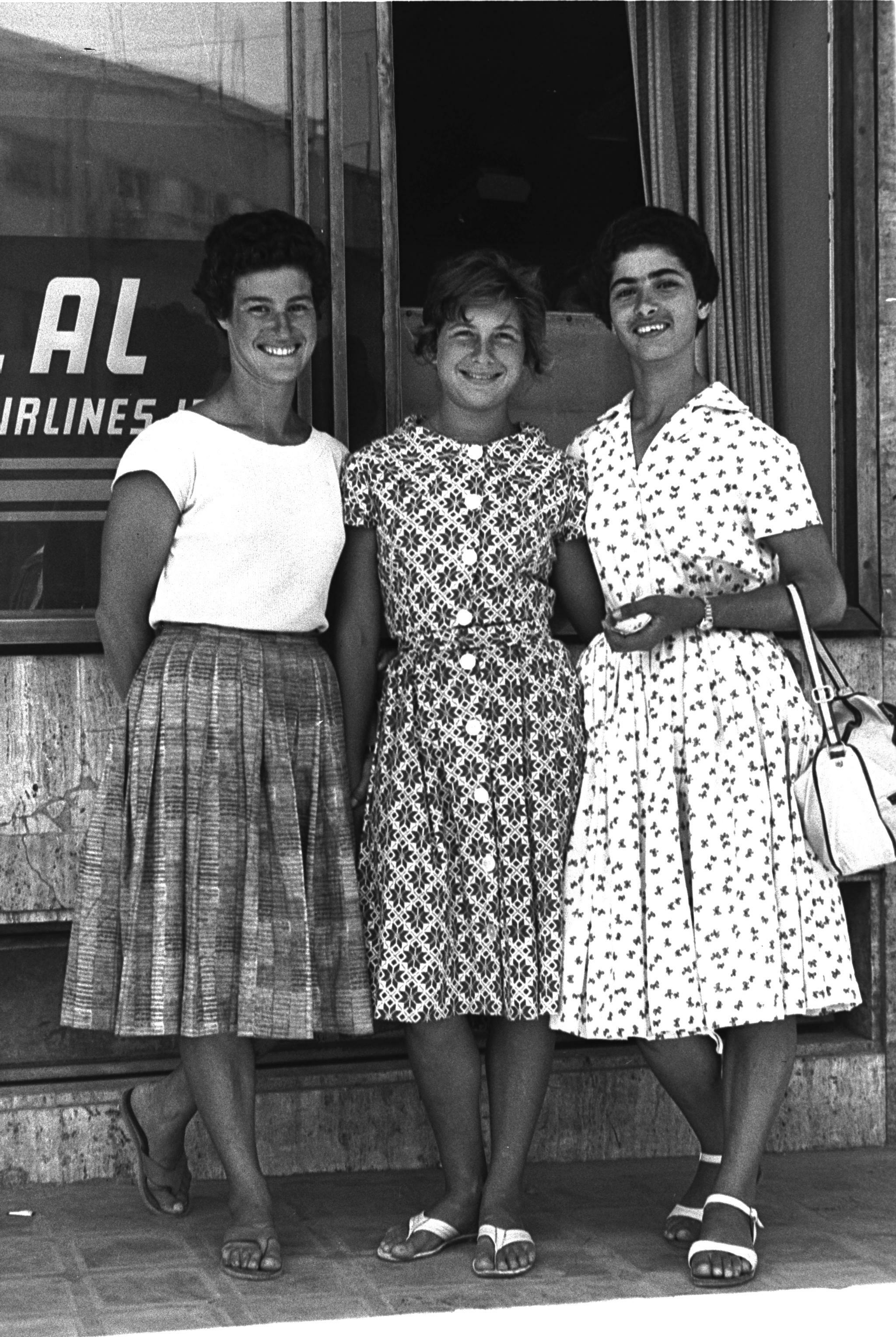
- Israel's women gymnasts on departure for Rome Olympics; L-R, Miriam Kara, Ruth Abeles, Ralli Ben-Yehuda.

Personal information
- Alternative name: ראלי בן יהודה
- Born: September 26, 1934 (age 91) Tel Aviv, Israel
- Height: 5 ft 1.5 in (156 cm)

Gymnastics career
- Discipline: Women's artistic gymnastics
- Country represented: Israel

Ralli Ben-Yehuda (Hebrew: ראלי בן יהודה; born September 26, 1934) is an Israeli former Olympic gymnast.

She was born in Tel Aviv and is Jewish.

== Gymnastics career ==
Ben-Yehuda competed for Israel at the 1960 Summer Olympics in Rome, Italy, at the age of 25. She placed 81st in the individual all-around, 72nd on the floor exercise, and 86th on the balance beam, and tied for 96th on the horse vault and 62nd on the uneven bars. When she competed in the Olympics, she was 5 ft 1.5 in (156 cm) tall and weighed 115 lb (52 kg).
