= Amos Grodzinowsky =

Israeli former Olympic runner (born 1940)

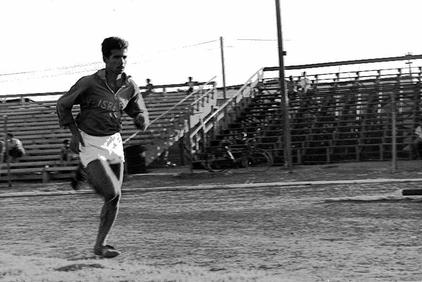
- Amos Grodzinowsky

Personal information
- Native name: עמוס גרודז'ינובסקי
- Citizenship: Israel
- Born: June 3, 1940 (age 86) Tel Aviv
- Height: 5 ft 8.5 in (174 cm)
- Weight: 143 lb (65 kg)

Sport
- Country: Israel
- Sport: Athletics
- Events: 100m; 200m; 400m

Achievements and titles
- National finals: Israeli Champion in 100 metres (1960), and in 200 metres (1962-63).
- Personal bests: 200 metres: 21.99 (1960); 400 metres: 47.6 (1966)

Amos Grodzinowsky (also "Grodzinowsky" and "Grozhinowski"; Hebrew: עמוס גרודז'ינובסקי; born June 3, 1940) is an Israeli former Olympic runner. He was the Israeli Men's Champion in the 100 metres in 1960, and in the 200 metres in 1962 and 1963.

He was born in Tel Aviv, Israel.

== Running career ==
His personal bests were 21.97 in the 200 metres (in 1960); and 48.1 in the 400 metres (in 1966). He was the Israeli Men's Champion in the 100 metres in 1960, and in the 200 metres in 1962 and 1963.

He competed for Israel at the 1960 Summer Olympics in Rome, Italy, at the age of 20 in Athletics. In the Men's 100 metres he came in 6th in Heat 1 with a time of 11.1, in the Men's 200 metres he came in 4th in Heat 9 with a time of 21.8, and in the Men's 400 metres he came in 6th in Heat 9 with a time of 48.9. When he competed in the Olympics, he was 5 ft 8.5 in (174 cm) tall, and weighed 143 lb (65 kg).
