= Israel at the 1960 Summer Olympics =

- IOC code: ISR
- NOC: Olympic Committee of Israel

in Rome
- Competitors: 23 in 7 sports
- Flag bearer: Gideon Ariel
- Medals: Gold 0 Silver 0 Bronze 0 Total 0

Summer Olympics appearances (overview)
- 1952; 1956; 1960; 1964; 1968; 1972; 1976; 1980; 1984; 1988; 1992; 1996; 2000; 2004; 2008; 2012; 2016; 2020; 2024; 2028

Israel competed at the 1960 Summer Olympics in Rome, Italy. 23 competitors, 17 men and 6 women, took part in 28 events in 7 sports.

== Results by event ==
=== Athletics ===
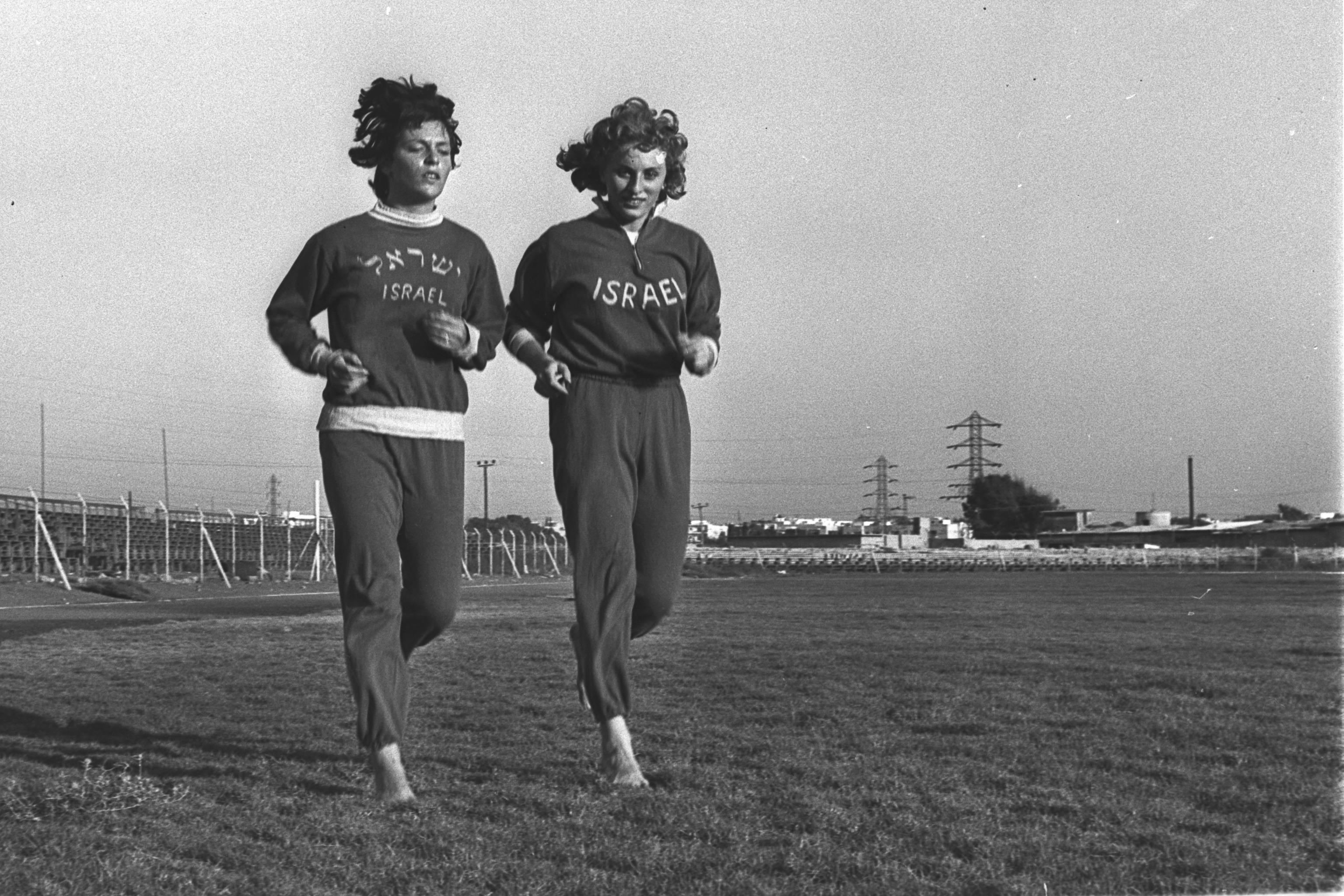
Ilana Adir (left) and Ilana Karaszyk prepare to compete in the 1960 Olympics.

Gideon Ariel

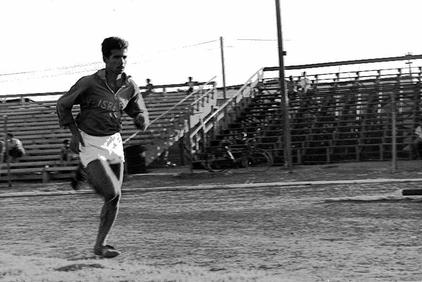
Amos Grodzinowsky

Event	Participant	Result	Ref
Women's 100 metres	Ilana Adir	6th in Heat 5	
Men's Shot Put	Gideon Ariel	21st	
Men's 100 metres; Men's 200 metres; Men's 400 metres	Amos Grodzinowsky	6th in Heat 1; 4th in Heat 9; 6th in Heat 9	
Women's Shot Put	Ayala Hezroni	17th	
Men's Javelin Throw	Baruch Feinberg	24th	
Men's 800 metres; Men's 1,500 metres	Yair Pantilat	5th in Heat 1; 12th in Heat 3	
Men's Long Jump	David Kushnir	25th	
Women's Long Jump; Women's 200 metres	Ilana Karaszyk	28th; 5th in Heat 2	

=== Cycling ===
Two cyclists, both men, represented Israel in 1960.

Event	Participant	Result	Ref
Men's individual road race	Henry Ohayon	39th	
Men's individual road race	Itzhak Ben David	DNF	

=== Fencing ===
Two sabre fencers, both men, represented Israel in 1960.

Event	Participant	Result	Ref
Men's sabre	Michael Ron	5th in Pool 9	
Men's sabre	David van Gelder	6th in Pool 12	

=== Gymnastics ===
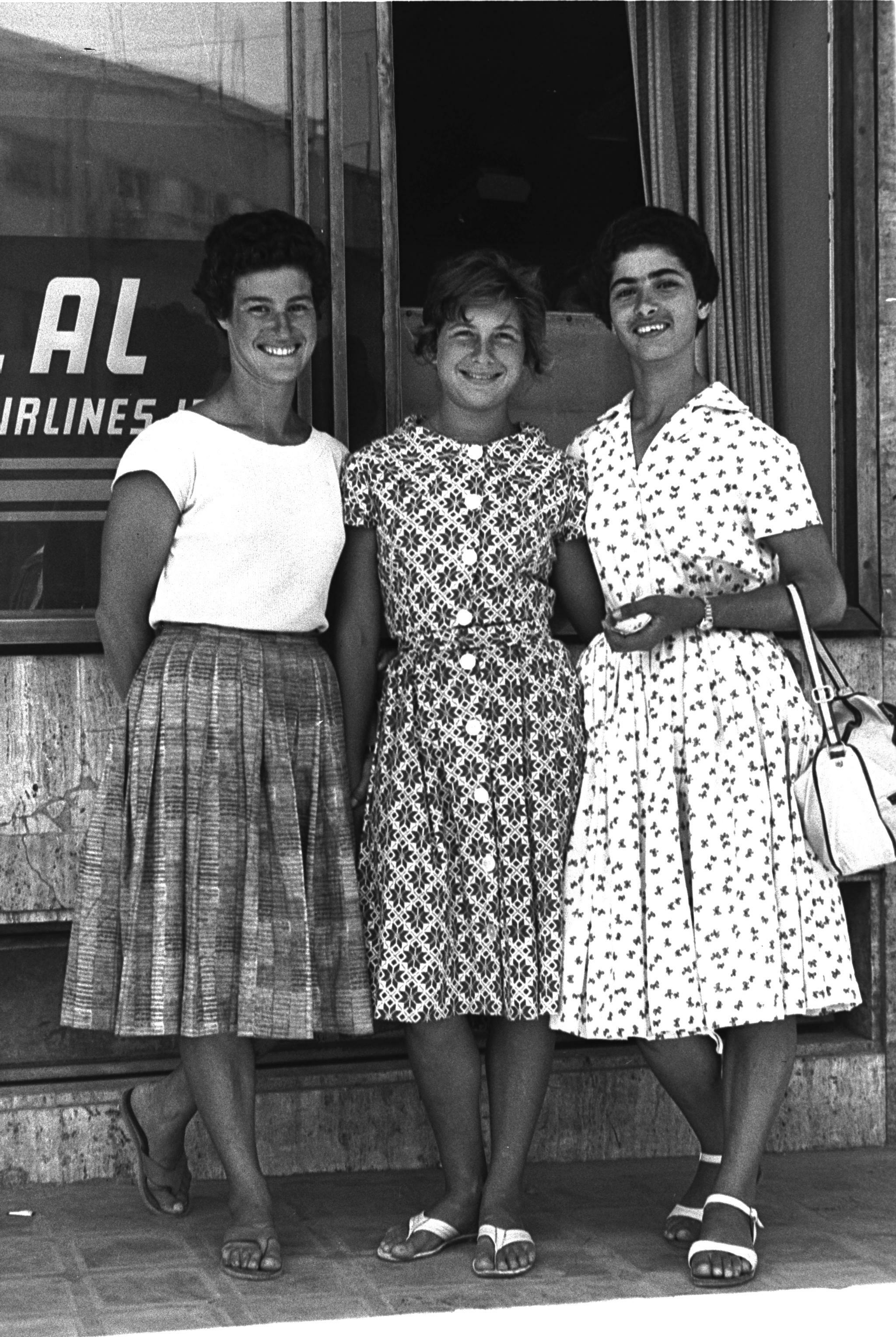
L-R, Miriam Kara, Ruth Abeles, Ralli Ben-Yehuda

Event	Participant	Result	Ref
Women's Individual All-Around; Women's Floor Exercise; Women's Horse Vault; Women's Uneven Bars; Women's Balance Beam	Ruth Abeles	93rd; 79th; 100th; 55th; 108th	
Women's Individual All-Around; Women's Floor Exercise; Women's Horse Vault; Women's Uneven Bars; Women's Balance Beam	Ralli Ben-Yehuda	81st; 72nd; 96th (tied); 62nd (tied); 86th	
Women's Individual All-Around; Women's Floor Exercise; Women's Horse Vault; Women's Uneven Bars; Women's Balance Beam	Miriam Kara	86th (tied); 83rd; 108th; 68th; 84th	

=== Shooting ===
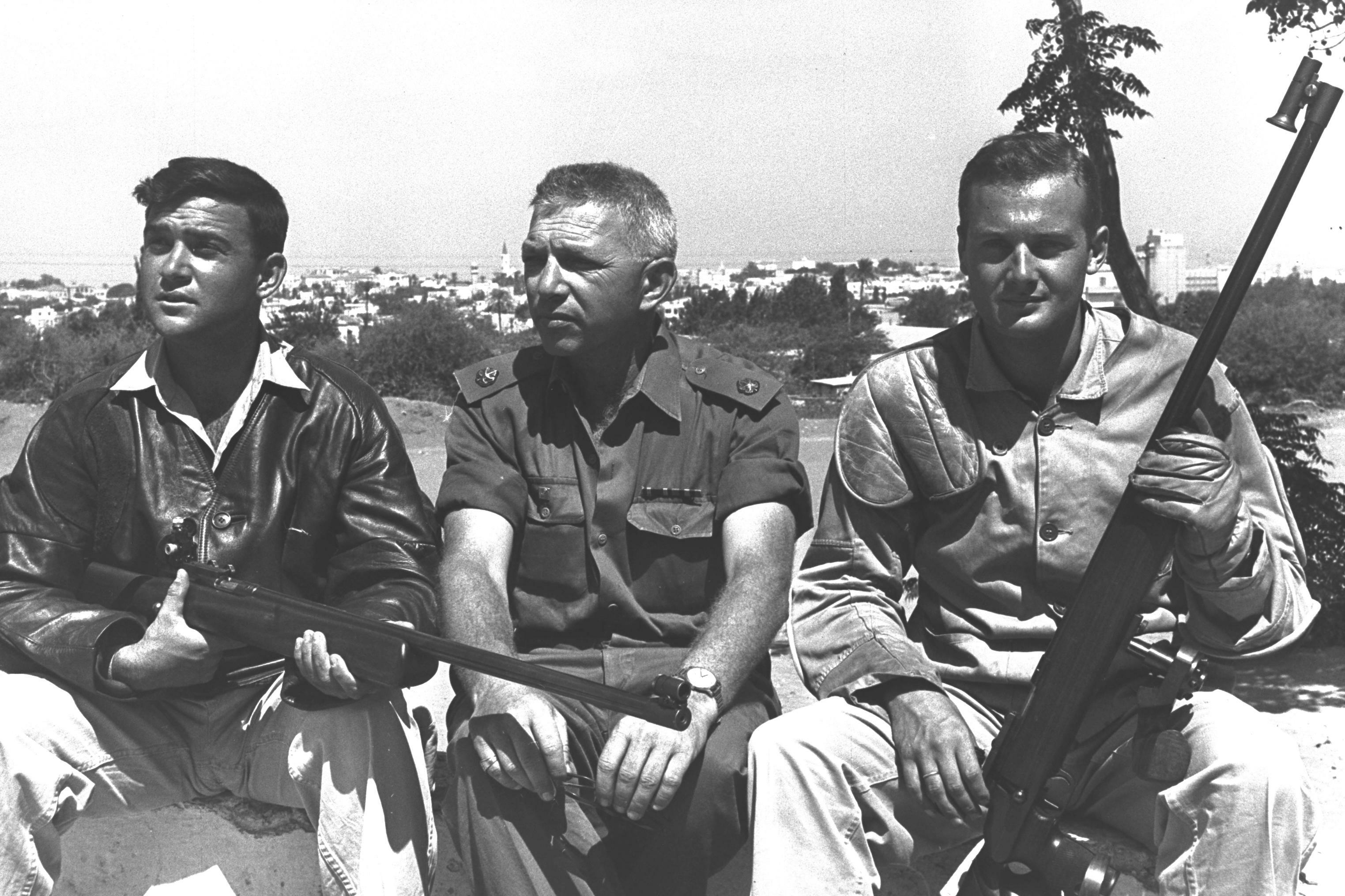
L-R, Hannan Crystal, trainer Izzy Gilam, and Rafael Peles

Two shooters represented Israel in 1960.

Event	Participant	Result	Ref
Men's 50 metre rifle, three positions; Men's 50 metre rifle, prone	Rafael Peles	50th; 57th (tied)	
Men's 50 metre rifle, three positions; Men's 50 metre rifle, prone	Hannan Crystal	48th; 71st (tied)	

=== Swimming ===
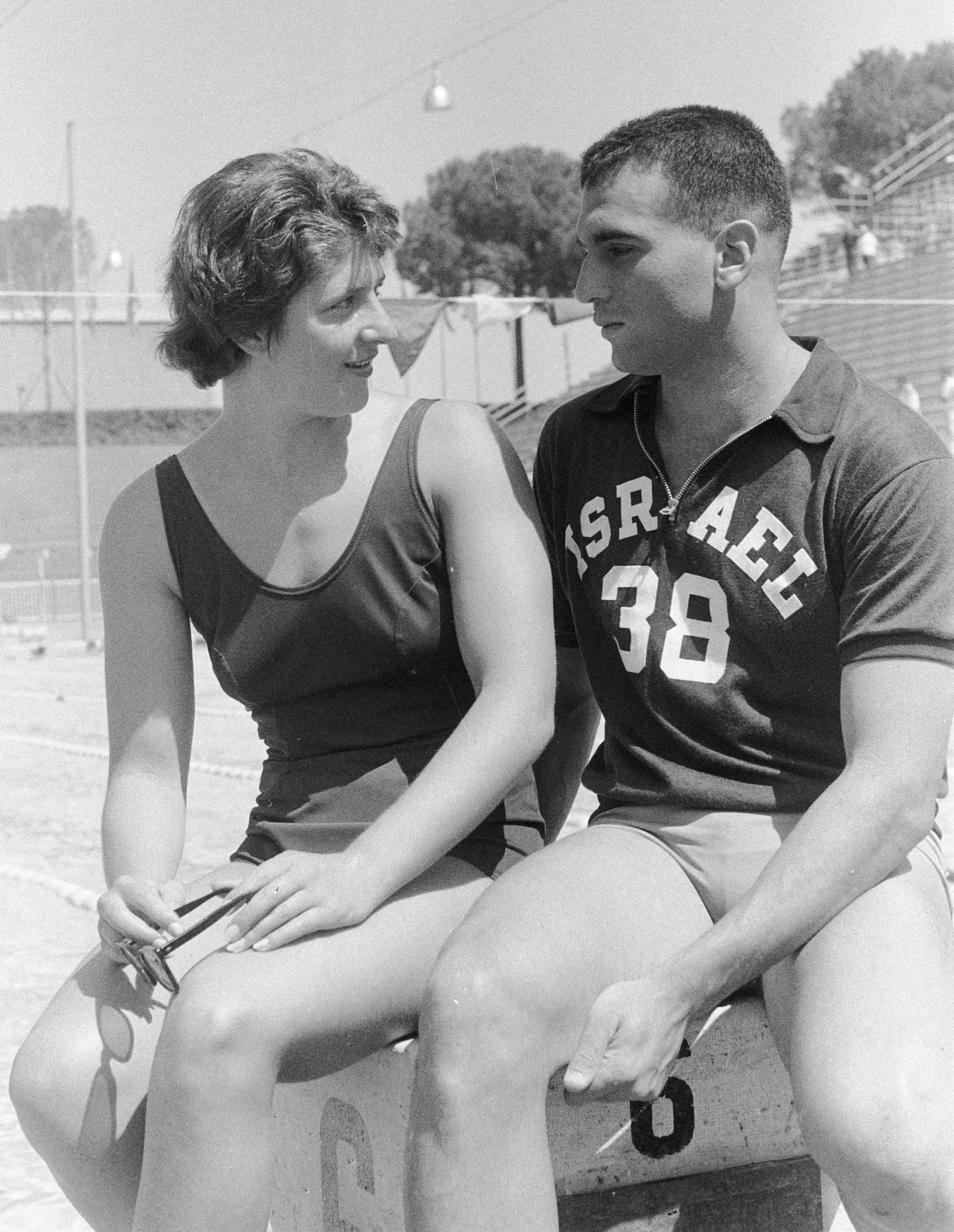
Amiram Trauber (right) and Dawn Fraser at the 1960 Olympics

Event	Participant	Result	Ref
Men's 4 × 100 metre medley relay; Men's 100 metre freestyle; Men's 400 metre freestyle	Amiram Trauber	6th in Heat 1; 5th in Heat 4; 6th in Heat 4	
Men's 4 × 100 metre medley relay; Men's 100 metre freestyle	Yizthak Lurie	6th in Heat 1; 8th in Heat 7	
Men's 4 × 100 metre medley relay; Men's 100 metre Backstroke	Yoram Shneider	6th in Heat 1; 7th in Heat 2	
Men's 4 × 100 metre medley relay; Men's 200 metre Breaststroke	Gershon Shefa	6th in Heat 1; 6th in Heat 6	

=== Weightlifting ===
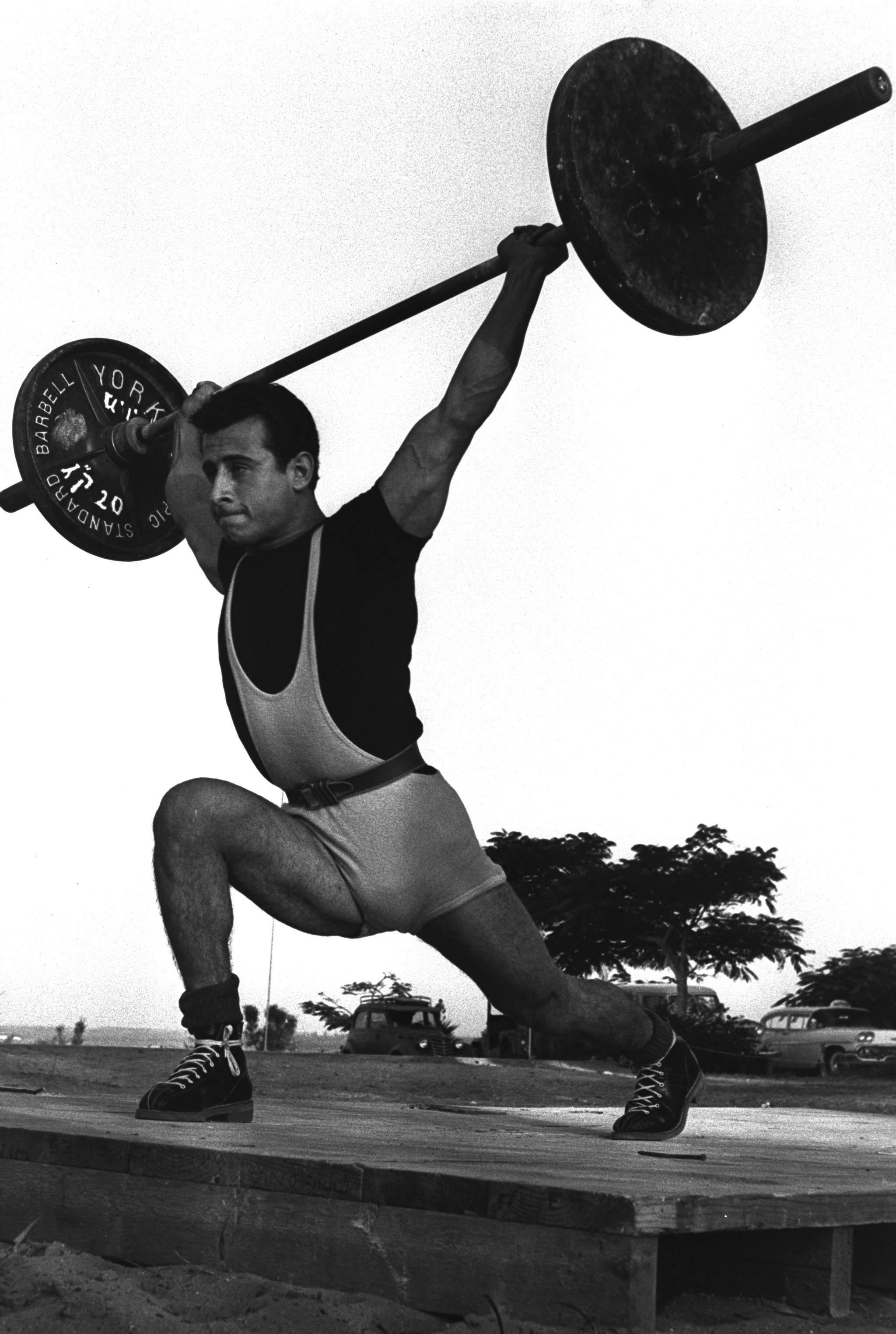
Eduard Meron (1960)

Event	Participant	Result	Ref
Men's Featherweight	Gezi Cohen	19th	
Men's Bantamweight	Eduard Meron	18th	
