= Lin Chau-tai =

Taiwanese long jumper

Personal information
- Nationality: Taiwanese
- Born: 4 July 1938 (age 88)

Sport
- Sport: Athletics
- Event: Long jump

Lin Chau-tai (born 4 July 1938) is a Taiwanese athlete. She competed in the women's long jump at the 1960 Summer Olympics. She was the first woman to represent Taiwan at the Olympics.
