= Gezi Cohen =

Israeli weightlifter (born 1938)

Personal information
- Native name: גזי כהן
- Born: 1938 (age 86–87); Baghdad, Iraq
- Height: 5 ft 4.5 in (163.8 cm)
- Weight: 132 lb (60 kg)

Sport
- Country: Israel
- Sport: Weightlifting
- Weight class: Featherweight

Gezi Cohen is (Hebrew: גזי כהן; sometimes "Gazi"; born in 1938) is an Israeli former Olympic weightlifter. Cohen was born in Baghdad, Iraq.

== Weightlifting career ==
He competed for Israel at the 1960 Summer Olympics in Rome, in Weightlifting--Men's Featherweight. Cohen came in 19th after lifting 285 kilograms (628 lb) total in his best lifts in military press, snatch, and clean & jerk. When he competed in the Olympics, he was 5 ft 4.5 in (163.8 cm) tall, and weighed 132 pounds (60 kg).
