= Ruth Abeles =

Israeli artistic gymnast

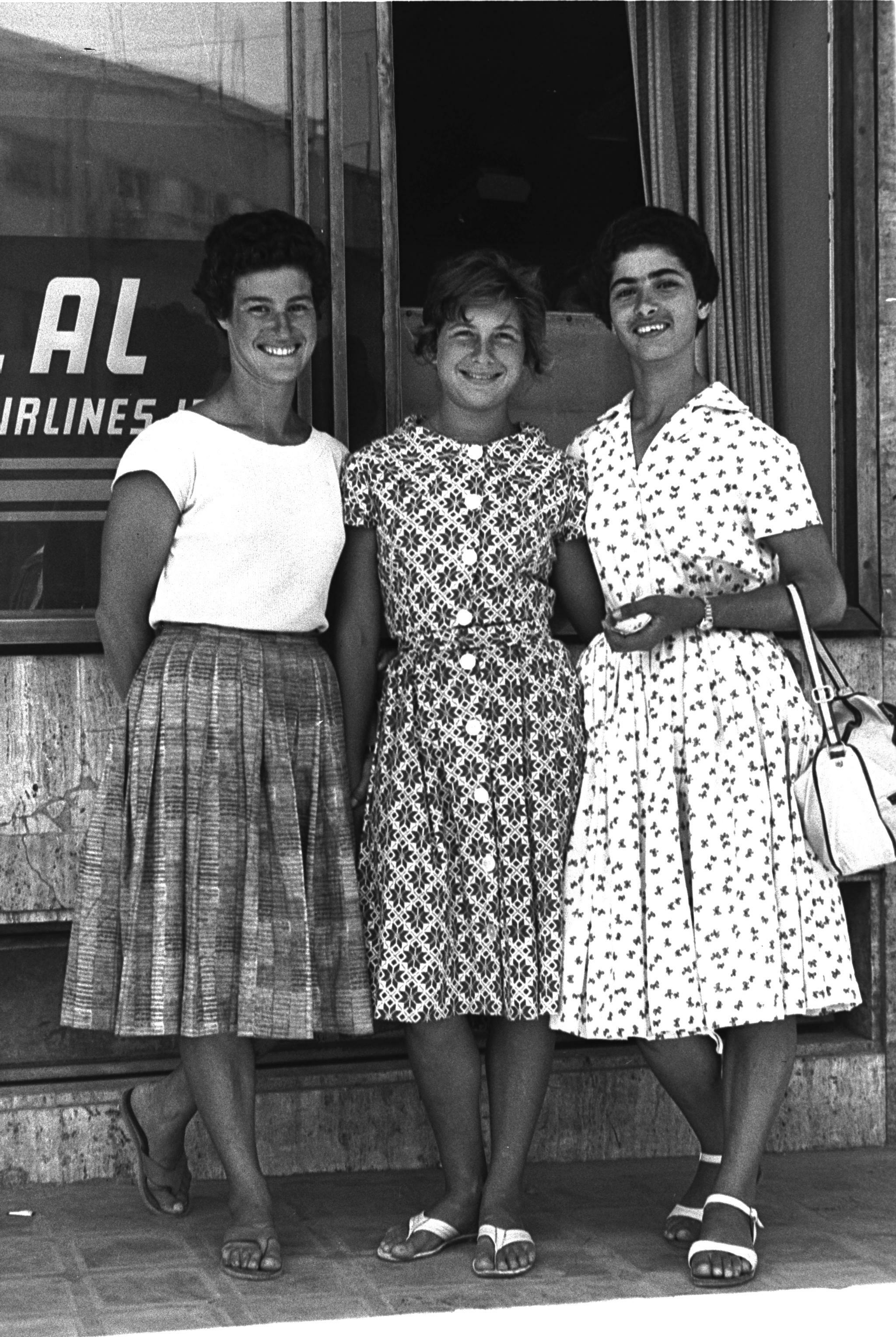
- Israel's women gymnasts on departure for Rome Olympics; L-R, Miriam Kara, Ruth Abeles, Ralli Ben-Yehuda.

Personal information
- Alternative name: רות אבלס
- Born: August 7, 1942 (age 84) Haifa, Mandatory Palestine
- Height: 5 ft 0 in (152 cm)

Gymnastics career
- Discipline: Women's artistic gymnastics
- Country represented: Israel

Ruth Abeles-Peled (Hebrew: רות אבלס; born August 7, 1942) is an Israeli former Olympic gymnast.

She was born in Haifa, Israel, and is Jewish.

== Gymnastics career ==
She competed for Israel at the 1960 Summer Olympics in Rome, Italy, in gymnastics at the age of 18. In the Women's Individual All-Around, she came in 93rd out of 124 gymnasts, in the Women's Floor Exercise she came in 79th, in the Women's Horse Vault she came in 100th, in the Women's Uneven Bars she came in tied for 55th, and in the Women's Balance Beam she came in tied for 108th. When she competed in the Olympics she was 5 feet 0 inches (152 cm) tall and weighed 106 pounds (48 kg).

At the 1962 World Artistic Gymnastics Championships, she helped the Israeli team gain 15th place as she finished in 67th place in the individual all-around.
