= Renate Junker =

German long jumper

Personal information
- Nationality: German
- Born: 26 March 1938 (age 88) Spremberg, Province of Brandenburg, Germany

Sport
- Sport: Athletics
- Event: Long jump

Renate Junker (born 26 March 1938) is a German athlete. She competed in the women's long jump at the 1960 Summer Olympics.
