= Sylvia Mitchell =

Australian long jumper

Personal information
- Nationality: Australian
- Born: 13 October 1937 (age 88) Adelong, New South Wales
- Height: 164 cm (5 ft 5 in)
- Weight: 57 kg (126 lb)

Sport
- Sport: Athletics
- Event: Long jump

Sylvia J. Mitchell (born 13 October 1937) is an Australian athlete. She competed in the women's long jump at the 1960 Summer Olympics.
