= Miriam Kara =

Israeli artistic gymnast

- מרים קארה
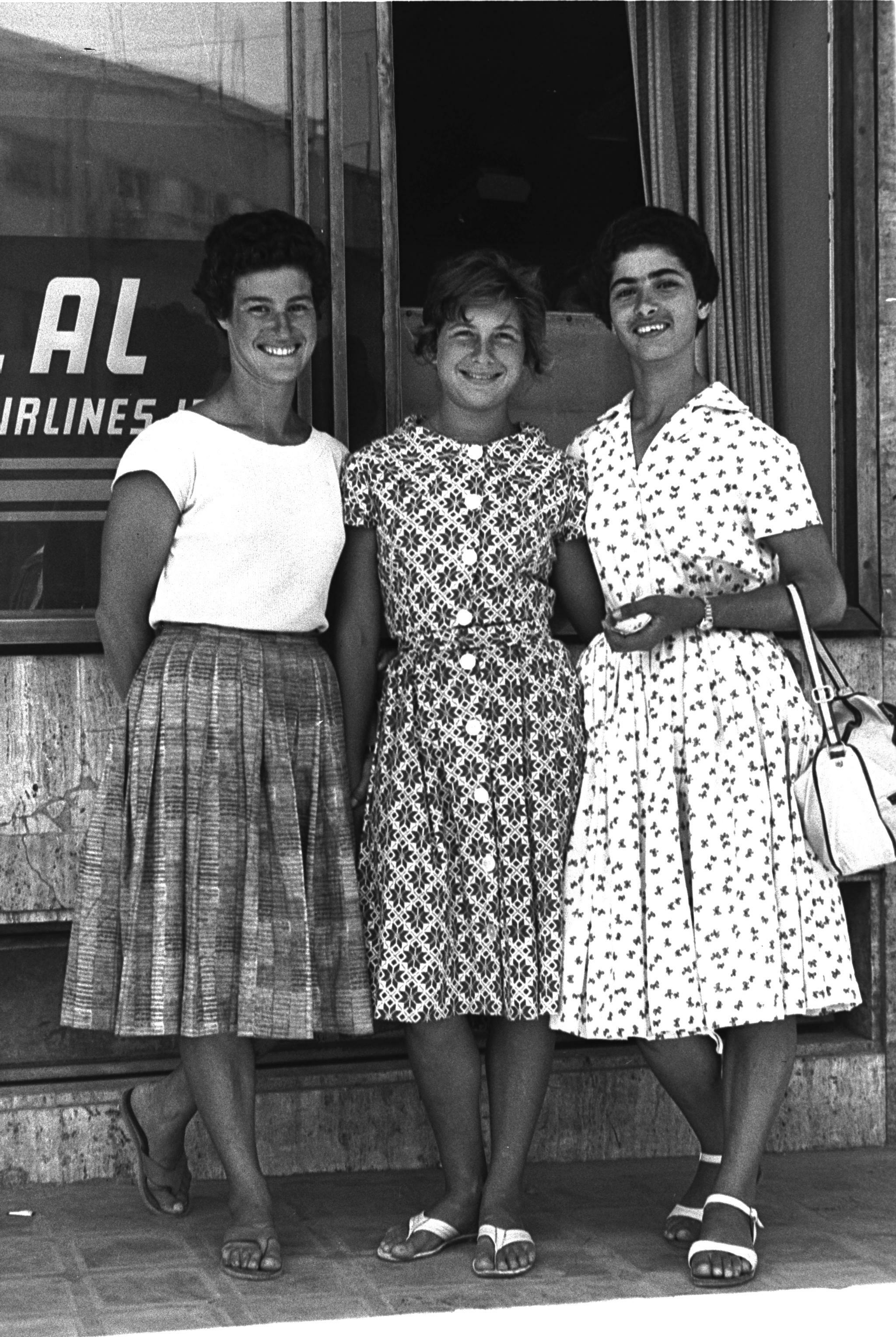
- Israel's women gymnasts on departure for Rome Olympics; L–R, Miriam Kara, Ruth Abeles, Ralli Ben-Yehuda.

Personal information
- Born: December 3, 1938 (age 87) Jerusalem
- Height: 5 ft 3 in (160 cm)

Gymnastics career
- Discipline: Women's artistic gymnastics
- Country represented: Israel

Miriam Kara (Hebrew: מרים קארה; born December 3, 1938) is an Israeli former Olympic gymnast.

She was born in Jerusalem and is Jewish.

== Gymnastics career ==
Kara competed for Israel at the 1960 Summer Olympics in Rome, Italy, in gymnastics at the age of 21. In the Women's Individual All-Around she came in tied for 86th out of 124 gymnasts, in the Women's Floor Exercise she came in 83rd, in the Women's Horse Vault she came in 108th, in the Women's Uneven Bars she came in 68th, and in the Women's Balance Beam she came in 84th. When she competed in the Olympics she was 5 feet 3 inches (160 cm) tall and weighed 110 pounds (50 kg).

At the 1962 World Artistic Gymnastics Championships Kara came in 83rd overall as the Israeli team came in 15th overall, and at the 1966 World Artistic Gymnastics Championships she came in 103rd as the Israeli team came in 16th.
