= Valerie Morgan =

New Zealand athlete (born 1943)

Valerie Dillimore
Personal information
- Born: Valerie Ailsa Morgan; 17 October 1943 (age 83) Auckland, New Zealand
- Height: 1.79 m (5 ft 10 in)
- Weight: 68 kg (150 lb)
- Relative: Robin Dillimore (daughter)

Sport
- Country: New Zealand
- Sport: Track and field
- Events: 100 m, 200 m, long jump
- Coached by: Joe McManemin

Achievements and titles
- National finals: 100 yd champion (1960); 220 yd champion (1960); Long jump champion (1961)

Valerie Ailsa Dillimore (née Morgan; born 17 October 1943) is a former New Zealand athlete. A sprinter, she represented New Zealand as a 16-year-old at the 1960 Rome Olympics. In the 100 m she clocked 12.61 s in her heat and progressed to the quarterfinals, where she ran 12.66 s and did not progress further. She ran her 200 m heat in 25.39 s and was eliminated.

In 1960 she was the New Zealand 100 yards and 220 yards champion, and the following year was the national long jump champion with a leap of 5.79 m.

Morgan was married to Anthony Errol (Tony) Dillimore, who died in April 2019. She is the mother of Robin Dillimore, who played netball for New Zealand on 32 occasions, and of Carlene Dillimore who competed in the 800 metres and 4 × 400 metres relay at the 1990 Commonwealth Games.

A former student of Waihi Central School, she officially opened the school's new hall in 2012.
