= Madeleine Thétu =

French long jumper

Personal information
- Nationality: French
- Born: 23 November 1937 (age 88)

Sport
- Sport: Athletics
- Event: Long jump

Madeleine Thétu (born 23 November 1937) is a French athlete. She competed in the women's long jump at the 1960 Summer Olympics.
