= Mária Bácskai =

Hungarian sprinter

Personal information
- Nationality: Hungarian
- Born: 26 March 1938 (age 87)

Sport
- Sport: Sprinting
- Event: 4 × 100 metres relay

Mária Bácskai (born 26 March 1938) is a Hungarian sprinter. She competed in the women's 4 × 100 metres relay at the 1960 Summer Olympics.
