= Ilana Karaszyk =

Israeli athletics competitor

Ilana Karaszyk אילנה קרשיק
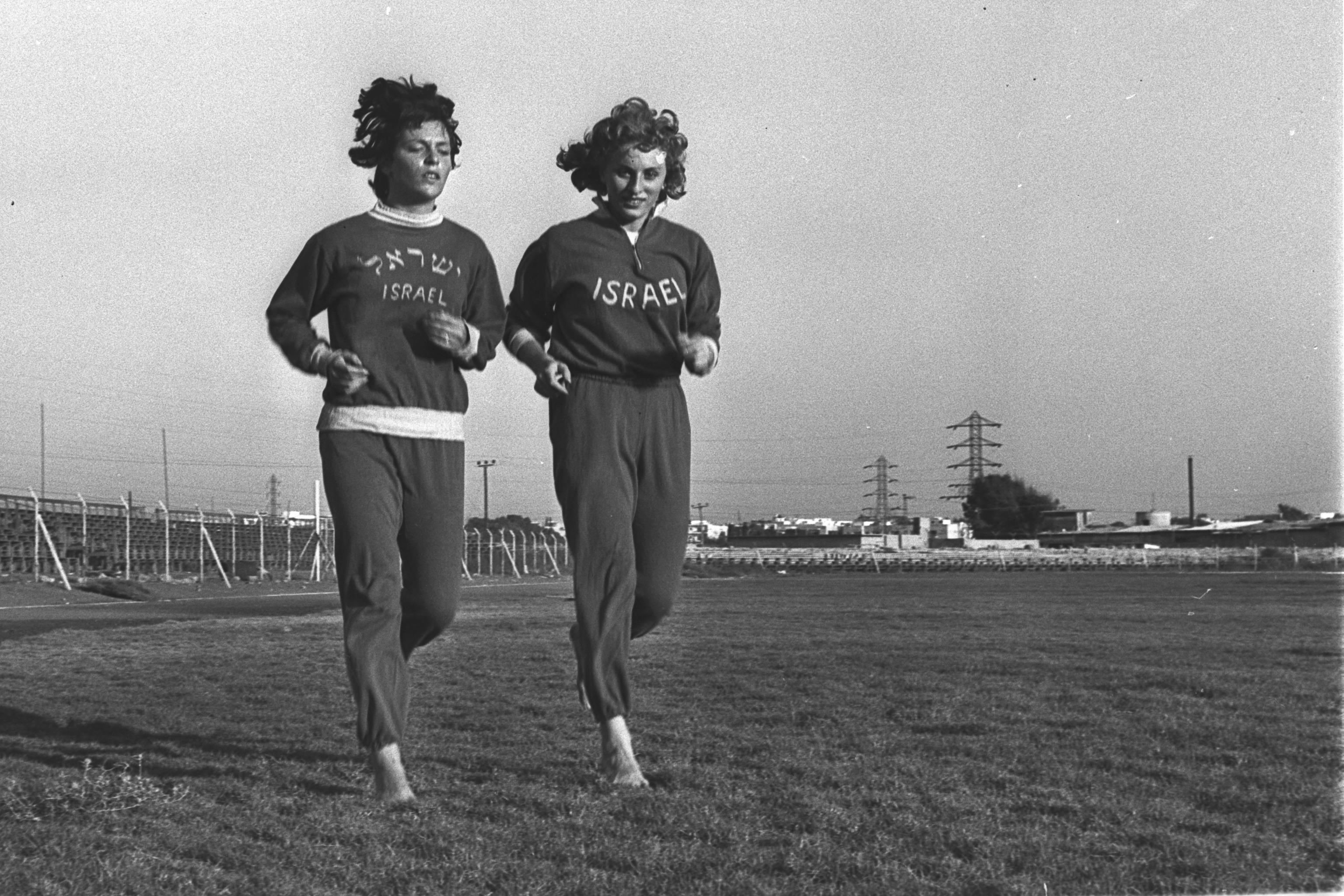
- Ilana Adir (left) and Ilana Karaszyk (right) prepare to compete in the 1960 Olympics.

Personal information
- Born: July 1, 1938 (age 88) Poland
- Height: 5 ft 4.5 in (164 cm)
- Weight: 130 lb (59 kg)

Sport
- Country: Israel
- Sport: Athletics
- Events: 200 metres and long jump

Achievements and titles
- National finals: Israeli Champion in 200 metres and long jump (1960)
- Personal best: long jump: 5.39 (1960)

Ilana Karaszyk (also "Karashik"; Hebrew: אילנה קרשיק; born July 1, 1938) is an Israeli former Olympic runner and long jumper. In 1960 she was the Israeli Women's Champion in the 200 metre run and in the long jump.

Karaszyk was born in Poland, and is Jewish.

== Running and long jump career ==
Her personal best was 5.39 in the long jump, in 1960. In 1960 Karaszyk was the Israeli Women's Champion in the long jump with a jump of 5.13 metres, and in the 200 metre run with a time of 26.8.

Karaszyk competed for Israel at the 1960 Summer Olympics in Rome, Italy, in Athletics at the age of 22. In the Women's Long Jump she came in 28th with a best jump of 5.08 metres. In the Women's 200 metres she came in fifth in Heat 2 with a time of 26.5. When she competed in the Olympics she was 5 ft 4.5 in (164 cm) tall and weighed 130 lb (59 kg).
