= Nancy Lewington =

Canadian sprinter

Nancy Lewington (born 10 April 1941) is a Canadian sprinter, born in Hamilton, Ontario, who competed in the 1960 Rome Olympics, where she ran in the Women's 100 metres and the Women's 4 × 100 metres relay.

She is also a photographer with works on display with the Art of the Olympians.
