= Athletics at the 1960 Summer Olympics – Women's long jump =

Women's long jump at the Games of the XVII Olympiad
- Venue: Olympic Stadium
- Dates: August 31, 1960
- Competitors: 30 from 18 nations
- Winning distance: 6.37 OR

Medalists
| 1st place, gold medalist(s) | | Vera Kolashnikova; Soviet Union |
| 2nd place, silver medalist(s) | | Elżbieta Krzesińska; Poland |
| 3rd place, bronze medalist(s) | | Hildrun Claus; United Team of Germany |

The women's long jump field event at the 1960 Olympic Games took place on August 31.

== Results ==
Top 12 jumpers and all ties plus all jumpers reaching 5.80 metres advanced to the finals. All distances are listed in metres.

=== Qualifying ===
| Rank | Name | Nationality | Mark | 1 | 2 | 3 | Notes |
|---|---|---|---|---|---|---|---|
| 1 | Mary Bignal | Great Britain | 6.33 | foul | 6.33 | pass | |
| 2 | Hildrun Claus | United Team of Germany | 6.21 | 6.21 | pass | pass | |
| 3 | Vera Kolashnikova | Soviet Union | 6.14 | 6.14 | pass | pass | |
| 4 | Elżbieta Krzesińska | Poland | 6.13 | 6.13 | pass | pass | |
| 5 | Beverly Weigel | New Zealand | 6.12 | foul | 6.12 | pass | |
| 6 | Willye White | United States | 6.07 | 6.07 | pass | pass | |
| 7 | Renate Junker | United Team of Germany | 6.00 | 6.00 | pass | pass | |
| 8 | Helen Frith | Australia | 5.98 | 5.98 | pass | pass | |
| 9 | Madeleine Thétu | France | 5.96 | 5.74 | 5.96 | foul | |
| 10 | Maria Piątkowska | Poland | 5.95 | 5.95 | pass | pass | |
| 11 | Maria Kusion | Poland | 5.92 | 5.92 | foul | foul | |
| 12 | Helga Hoffmann | United Team of Germany | 5.90 | 5.62 | foul | 5.90 | |
| 13 | Joke Bijleveld | Netherlands | 5.90 | 5.90 | pass | pass | |
| 14 | Fumiko Ito | Japan | 5.88 | 5.71 | 5.88 | foul | |
| 15 | Brita Johansson | Finland | 5.84 | 5.65 | 5.84 | foul | |
| 16 | Liudmyla Radchenko | Soviet Union | 5.83 | 5.70 | 5.83 | pass | |
| 17 | Christina Persighetti | Great Britain | 5.82 | 5.82 | pass | pass | |
| 18T | Norma Croker | Australia | 5.80 | 5.80 | pass | pass | |
| 18T | Valentina Shaprunova | Soviet Union | 5.80 | 5.80 | pass | pass | |
| 20 | Akiko Fukuda | Japan | 5.78 | 5.78 | foul | foul | |
| 21 | Piera Tizzoni | Italy | 5.65 | 5.63 | foul | 5.65 | |
| 22 | Vlasta Přikrylová | Czechoslovakia | 5.64 | 5.64 | 5.57 | foul | |
| 23 | Sylvia Mitchell | Australia | 5.60 | 5.47 | 5.20 | 5.60 | |
| 24 | Visitación Badana | Philippines | 5.59 | 5.38 | 5.59 | foul | |
| 25 | Lin Chau-tai | Formosa | 5.51 | 5.51 | 4.54 | 5.10 | |
| 26 | Yasuko Kimura | Japan | 5.45 | foul | foul | 5.45 | |
| 27 | Sally McCallum | Canada | 5.22 | 4.97 | foul | 5.22 | |
| 28 | Ilana Karaszyk | Israel | 5.08 | 4.78 | 4.92 | 5.08 | |
| 29 | Aycan Önel | Turkey | 4.97 | 4.97 | 4.92 | 4.84 | |
| | Annie Smith | United States | NM | foul | foul | foul | |
| | Gertrude Fries | Austria | DNS | | | | |

=== Final ===
| Rank | Name | Nationality | Mark | 1 | 2 | 3 | 4 | 5 | 6 | Notes |
|---|---|---|---|---|---|---|---|---|---|---|
| 1st place, gold medalist(s) | Vera Kolashnikova | Soviet Union | 6.37 | 6.17 | 6.01 | 6.22 | 6.37 OR | 6.17 | foul | OR |
| 2nd place, silver medalist(s) | Elżbieta Krzesińska | Poland | 6.27 | foul | 6.17 | foul | 6.25 | foul | 6.27 | |
| 3rd place, bronze medalist(s) | Hildrun Claus | United Team of Germany | 6.21 | 6.21 | 6.18 | foul | foul | 6.13 | 6.11 | |
| 4 | Renate Junker | United Team of Germany | 6.19 | 6.17 | 5.94 | 6.05 | 6.19 | 6.11 | 6.10 | |
| 5 | Liudmyla Radchenko | Soviet Union | 6.16 | 5.99 | 6.00 | 6.16 | 5.83 | 5.91 | 5.90 | |
| 6 | Helga Hoffmann | United Team of Germany | 6.11 | 6.02 | 5.88 | 6.11 | foul | foul | 6.09 | |
| 7 | Joke Bijleveld | Netherlands | 6.11 | 6.11 | foul | foul | | | | |
| 8 | Valentina Shaprunova | Soviet Union | 6.01 | 6.01 | 5.95 | 5.77 | | | | |
| 9 | Mary Bignal | Great Britain | 6.01 | foul | foul | 6.01 | | | | |
| 10 | Beverly Weigel | New Zealand | 5.98 | 5.98 | 5.81 | 5.91 | | | | |
| 11 | Maria Piątkowska | Poland | 5.98 | 5.98 | 5.67 | 5.86 | | | | |
| 12 | Fumiko Ito | Japan | 5.98 | 5.82 | 5.98 | 5.74 | | | | |
| 13 | Maria Kusion | Poland | 5.86 | 5.86 | 5.50 | foul | | | | |
| 14 | Madeleine Thétu | France | 5.85 | 5.73 | 5.85 | 5.83 | | | | |
| 15 | Norma Croker | Australia | 5.82 | 5.82 | 5.64 | 5.75 | | | | |
| 16 | Willye White | United States | 5.77 | 5.77 | foul | 5.28 | | | | |
| 17 | Helen Frith | Australia | 5.62 | foul | 5.62 | 5.61 | | | | |
| 18 | Brita Johansson | Finland | 5.57 | 5.57 | 5.56 | 5.52 | | | | |
| 19 | Christina Persighetti | Great Britain | 5.57 | 5.46 | 5.42 | 5.57 | | | | |

Key: OR = Olympic record; NM = no mark
