= Akiko Fukuda =

Japanese long jumper

Personal information
- Nationality: Japanese
- Born: 7 September 1937 (age 88)

Sport
- Sport: Athletics
- Event: Long jump

Akiko Fukuda (福田 晶子, Fukuda Akiko; born 7 September 1937) is a Japanese track and field athlete. She competed in the women's long jump at the 1960 Summer Olympics. She achieved a jump of 5.78 meters in the qualification round, placing 20th overall. Her personal best was 5.92 meters.
