= Joe McManemin =

Joe McManemin CBE QSO JP
- Born: Joseph de Valley McManemin; 2 January 1923; Auckland, New Zealand
- Died: 5 August 2014 (aged 91); Auckland, New Zealand
- Occupation: Pharmacist
- Relatives: Jonathan Trevethick (grandfather)

Joseph de Valley McManemin CBE QSO JP (2 January 1923 – 5 August 2014) was a New Zealand athletics coach and sports administrator.

== Biography ==
Born in Auckland in 1923, McManemin was educated at Auckland Grammar School and became a pharmacist, with a shop in the Auckland suburb of Mount Roskill.

A sprinter, McManemin was a member of the Old Grammarians' Club in Auckland. He became involved in athletics administration, and was elected to the committee of the Auckland Centre of the New Zealand Amateur Athletic Association in 1944. He went on to become a sprint coach, mentoring New Zealand representatives including Doreen Porter, Valerie Morgan and Maurice Rae.

McManemin went to the 1960 Rome Olympics as the New Zealand athletics team manager and was the general manager of the New Zealand team at the 1970 British Commonwealth Games in Edinburgh. He was chef de mission of the New Zealand team at the 1972 Olympic Games in Munich.

He served on the organizing committees for both the 1950 British Empire Games in Auckland and the 1974 British Commonwealth Games in Christchurch. With Norman Coop, he was co-founder of the 1990 Games Promotion Committee, which successfully bid in 1984 to stage the 1990 Commonwealth Games in Auckland. McManemin then went on to chair the organizing committee for that event.

McManemin served as president of both Athletics Auckland and Athletics New Zealand. A Freemason, he was grand master of Freemasons New Zealand from 1986 to 1988.

He died in Auckland in 2014.

== Honours ==
In the 1974 New Year Honours, McManemin was appointed a Commander of the Order of the British Empire, for services to sport and the community. He was appointed a Companion of the Queen's Service Order for community service in the 1990 New Year Honours.
