= Vivi Markussen =

Danish sprinter

Personal information
- Nationality: Danish
- Born: 24 October 1939
- Died: 22 December 2010 (aged 71)

Sport
- Sport: Sprinting
- Event: 100 metres

Vivi Markussen (24 October 1939 – 22 December 2010) was a Danish sprinter. She competed in the women's 100 metres at the 1960 Summer Olympics.
