= Elizabeth Jenner =

British sprinter

Elizabeth Ann Jenner
Personal information
- Nationality: British
- Born: 30 August 1941 (age 84)

Sport
- Sport: Sprinting
- Event: 100 metres

Elizabeth Ann Jenner (born 30 August 1941) is a British sprinter. She competed in the women's 100 metres at the 1960 Summer Olympics.
