= Anni Biechl =

German sprinter (born 1940)

Olympic medal record

Women's Athletics

Representing Germany
Silver medal – second place	1960 Rome	4 × 100 metre relay

Anni Biechl (born 17 March 1940) is a West German athlete who competed mainly in the 100 metres.

She competed for the United Team of Germany in the 1960 Summer Olympics held in Rome, Italy in the 4 × 100 metres where she won the silver medal with her teammates Martha Langbein, Brunhilde Hendrix and Jutta Heine.
