= Pat Duggan =

Australian sprinter

Personal information
- Nationality: Australian
- Born: 12 October 1937 Rockhampton, Queensland, Australia
- Died: 20 June 2015 (aged 77)

Sport
- Sport: Sprinting
- Event: 100 metres

Patricia Duggan (12 October 1937 – 20 June 2015) was an Australian sprinter. She competed in the women's 100 metres at the 1960 Summer Olympics.
