= Amiram Trauber =

Israeli swimmer

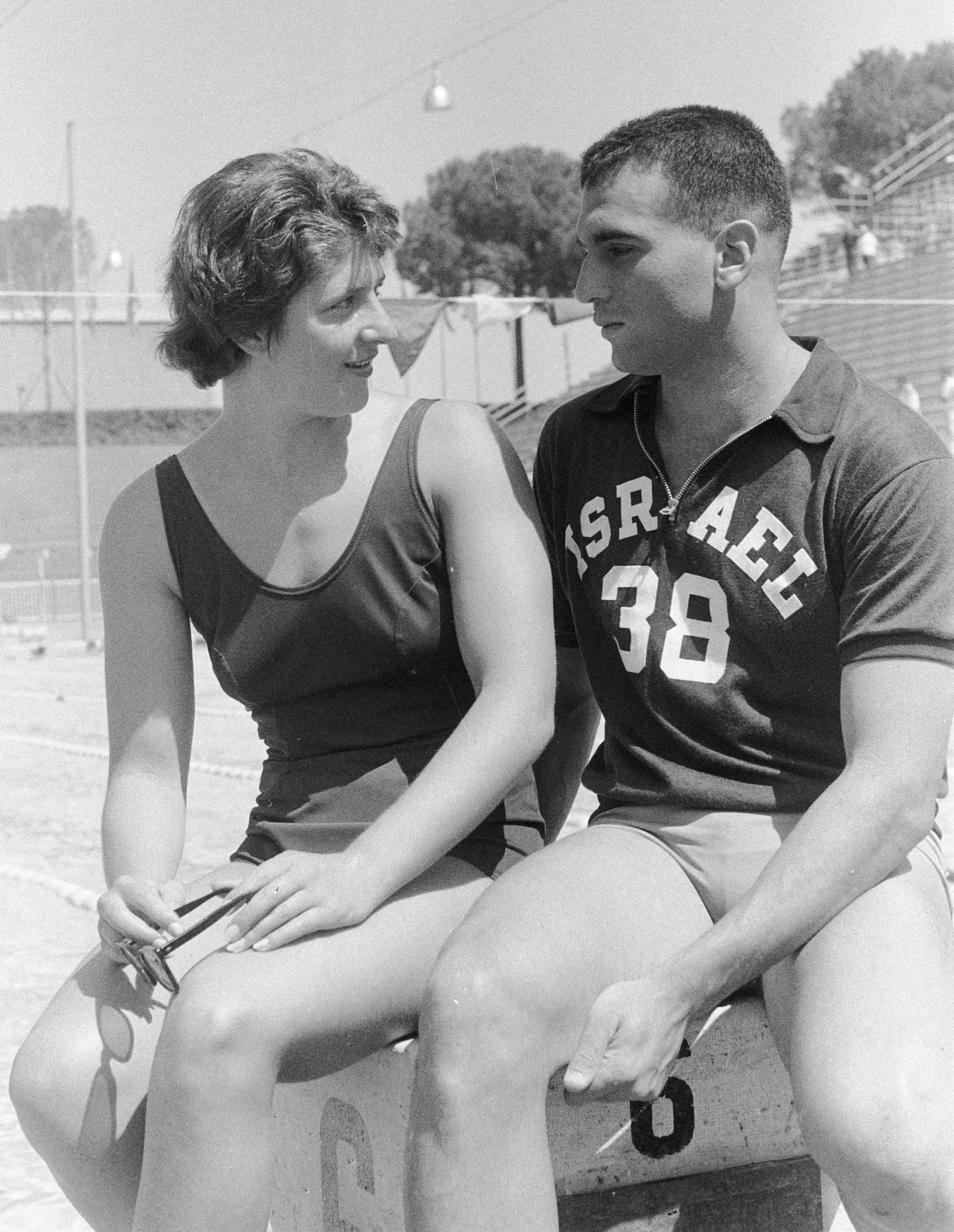
- Amiram Trauber (right) and Dawn Fraser at the 1960 Olympics

Personal information
- Native name: עמירם טראובר
- Nationality: Israeli
- Born: July 16, 1939 (age 86)
- Height: 1.84 m (6 ft 0 in)
- Weight: 85 kg (187 lb)

Sport
- Sport: Swimming
- Strokes: Freestyle

Amiram Trauber (Hebrew: עמירם טראובר; born July 16, 1939) is a former freestyle swimmer from Israel. He competed at the 1960 Summer Olympics in the 4 × 100 m medley relay and 100 m and 400 m freestyle events, but failed to reach the finals.
