= Liudmyla Radchenko =

Ukrainian long jumper (1932–2026)

Personal information
- Native name: Людмила Радченко
- Nationality: Ukrainian
- Born: 1 October 1932 Kyiv, Ukrainian SSR, Soviet Union
- Died: 29 October 2026 (aged 94)
- Height: 167 cm (5 ft 6 in)
- Weight: 59 kg (130 lb)

Sport
- Sport: Athletics
- Event: Long jump

Liudmyla Mykolaivna Radchenko (Ukrainian: Людмила Миколаївна Радченко; 1 October 1932 – 29 October 2026) was a Ukrainian athlete. She competed in the women's long jump at the 1960 Summer Olympics, representing the Soviet Union.

Radchenko died on 29 October 2026, at the age of 94.
