= Martha Langbein =

German sprinter

Medal record

Women's athletics

Representing Germany

Olympic Games
Silver medal – second place	1960 Rome	4 × 100 metre relay

Representing West Germany

European Championships
Silver medal – second place	1962 Belgrade	4×100 m

Martha Langbein (born 22 May 1941 in Heidelberg) is a West German athlete who competed mainly in the 100 metres.

She competed for the United Team of Germany in the 1960 Summer Olympics held in Rome, Italy in the 4 × 100 metres where she won the Silver medal with her team mates Anni Biechl, Brunhilde Hendrix and Jutta Heine.
