= Fumiko Ito =

Japanese long jumper (born 1940)

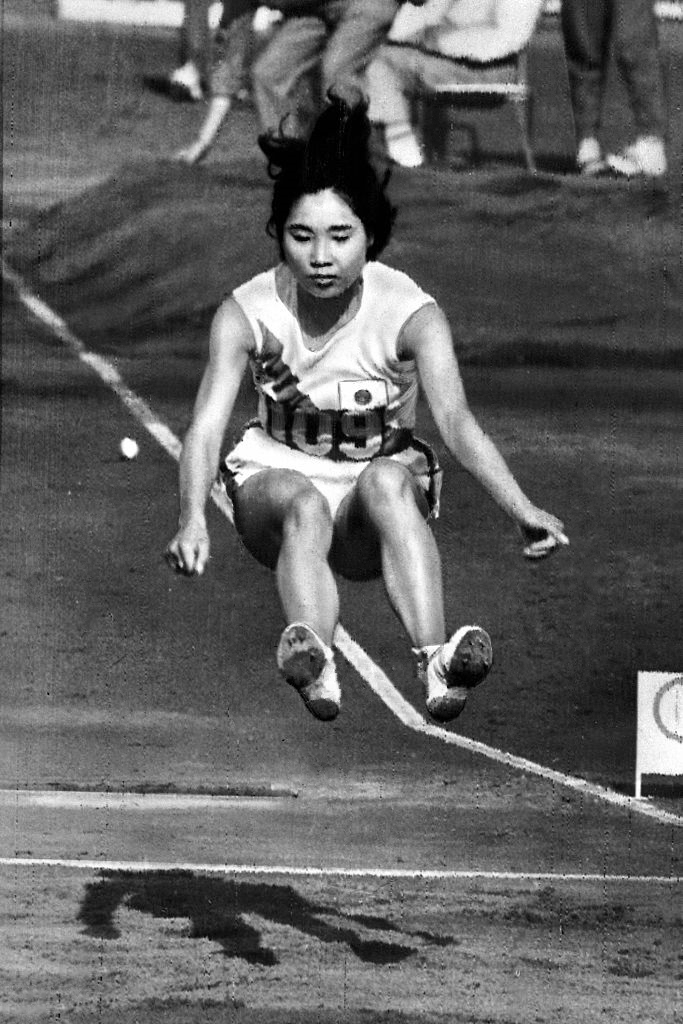
- Fumiko Ito at the 1960 Olympics

Personal information
- Born: March 5, 1940 (age 86) Ibaraki Prefecture, Japan
- Height: 159 cm (5 ft 3 in)
- Weight: 49 kg (108 lb)

Sport
- Sport: Athletics
- Event: Long jump

Achievements and titles
- Personal best: 6.11 m (1961)
Medal record
Representing Japan
Asian Games
Silver medal – second place	1962 Jakarta	Long jump

Fumiko Ito (伊藤 文子, Itō Fumiko; born March 5, 1940) is a retired Japanese long jumper. She placed 12th at the 1960 Summer Olympics and won a silver medal at the 1962 Asian Games.
