= Brunhilde Hendrix =

German sprinter

Olympic medal record

Women's Athletics

Representing Germany
Silver medal – second place	1960 Rome	4 × 100 metre relay

Brunhilde Hendrix (2 August 1938 in Langenzenn – 28 November 1995 in Sachsen bei Ansbach) was a West German athlete who competed mainly in the 100 metres.

Hendrix competed for the United Team of Germany in the 1960 Summer Olympics held in Rome, Italy in the 4 × 100 metres where she won the silver medal with her teammates Martha Langbein, Anni Biechl and Jutta Heine.

Both her parents (mother Marie Dollinger and father Friedrich Hendrix) were German 100-meter runners and successful athletes who competed in Olympic Games, too. Her mother, Marie Dollinger, was the only German woman to participate in three Olympic Games before World War II : 1928, 1932, and 1936.
