= Lucinda Williams (athlete) =

American sprinter

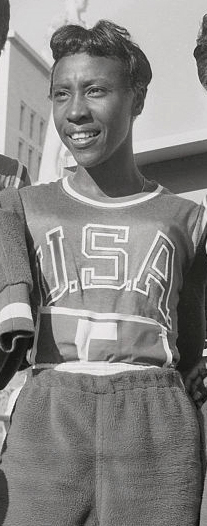
- Williams at the 1960 Summer Olympics

Personal information
- Full name: Lucinda Williams Adams
- Born: August 10, 1937 (age 89) Savannah, Georgia, U.S.
- Height: 166 cm (5 ft 5 in)
- Weight: 51 kg (112 lb)

Sport
- Sport: Athletics
- Event: Sprint
- Club: TSU Tigers, Nashville

Achievements and titles
- Personal bests: 100 m – 11.7 (1960); 200 m – 23.4 (1959)
Medal record
Representing the United States
Olympic Games
Gold medal – first place	1960 Rome	4 × 100 m relay
Pan American Games
Gold medal – first place	1959 Chicago	100 m
Gold medal – first place	1959 Chicago	200 m
Gold medal – first place	1959 Chicago	4 × 100 m relay

Lucinda Williams (later Adams, born August 10, 1937) is an American retired sprinter. She won a gold medal in the 4 × 100 m relay at the 1960 Olympics, but failed to reach the finals of the individual 100 m and 200 m events in 1956 and 1960. She earned three gold medals at the 1959 Pan American Games in these three events. In 1994, she was inducted into the Georgia Sports Hall of Fame.
