= Martha Hudson =

American sprinter (born 1939)

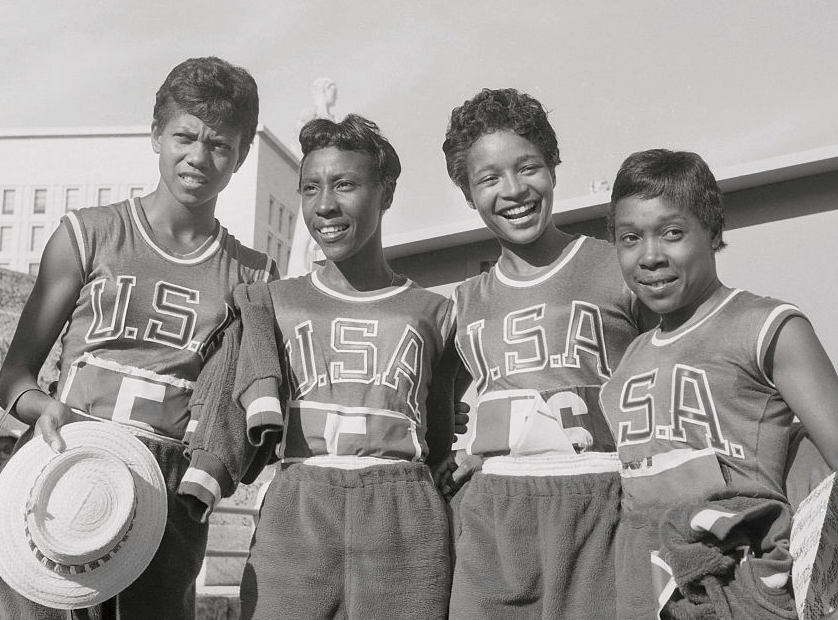
- Hudson (right) at the 1960 Summer Olympics

Personal information
- Full name: Martha B. Hudson Pennyman
- Born: March 21, 1939 (age 87) Eastman, Georgia, U.S.
- Height: 152 cm (5 ft 0 in)
- Weight: 53 kg (117 lb)

Sport
- Sport: Athletics
- Event: Sprint
- Club: TSU Tigers, Nashville

Achievements and titles
- Personal best: 100 m – 11.7 (1960)
Medal record
Representing the United States
Olympic Games
Gold medal – first place	1960 Rome	4 × 100 m relay

Martha B. Hudson (later Pennyman, born March 21, 1939) is an American retired sprinter. She won a gold medal in the 4 × 100 m relay at the 1960 Olympics, but failed to reach the final of the individual 100 m event. In 1959 she held the AAU indoor 100 yd title. In 1986 she was inducted into the Georgia Sports Hall of Fame.
