= Gymnastics at the 1952 Summer Olympics – Men's pommel horse =

Olympic gymnastics event

Men's pommel horse at the Games of the XV Olympiad
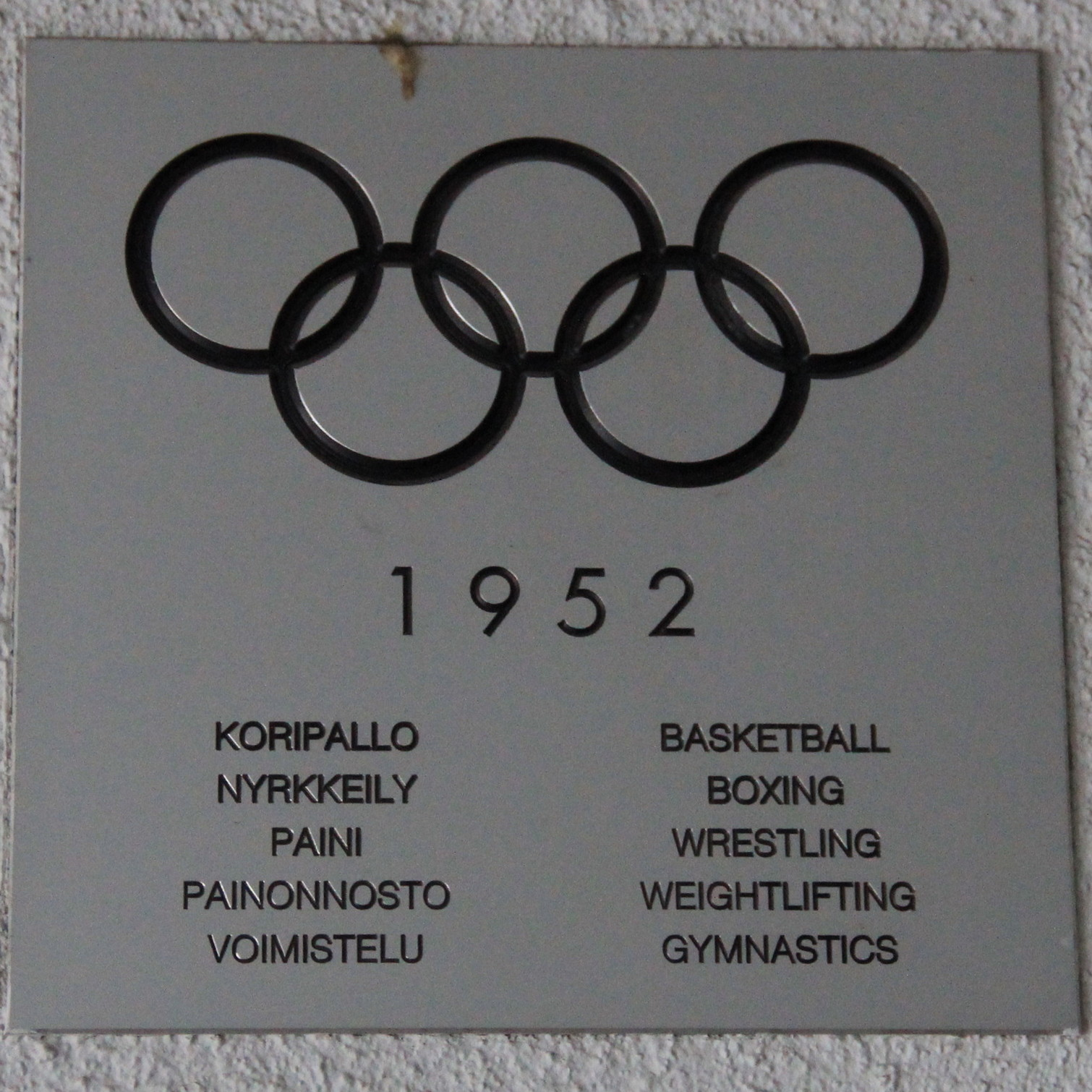
- Plaque at Töölö Sports Hall commemorating 1952 Olympic sports held there
- Venue: Töölö Sports Hall, Exhibition Hall I
- Dates: 19–21 July 1952
- Competitors: 185 from 29 nations
- Winning score: 19.50

Medalists
1st place, gold medalist(s)		Viktor Chukarin; Soviet Union
2nd place, silver medalist(s)		Yevgeny Korolkov; Soviet Union
2nd place, silver medalist(s)		Hrant Shahinyan; Soviet Union

The men's pommel horse competition at the 1952 Summer Olympics was held at Töölö Sports Hall, Exhibition Hall I from 19 to 21 July. It was the eighth appearance of the event. There were 185 competitors from 29 nations, with each nation sending up to 8 gymnasts. The event was won by Viktor Chukarin as the Soviet Union swept the medals in its debut. It was the fourth medal sweep in the event, and last before apparatus finals with a two-gymnast-per-nation limit made further sweeps impossible. Yevgeny Korolkov and Hrant Shahinyan tied for silver.

== Background ==
This was the eighth appearance of the event, which is one of the five apparatus events held every time there were apparatus events at the Summer Olympics (no apparatus events were held in 1900, 1908, 1912, or 1920). Five of the top 10 gymnasts from 1948 returned: joint gold medalists Paavo Aaltonen and Heikki Savolainen of Finland, fourth-place finisher Luigi Zanetti and fifth-place finisher Guido Figone of Italy, and eighth-place finisher Josef Stalder of Switzerland. Stalder was the reigning (1950) world champion.

Belgium, India, Norway, Poland, Portugal, Saar, South Africa, the Soviet Union, Spain, and Sweden each made their debut in the men's pommel horse. The United States made its seventh appearance, most of any nation, having missed only the inaugural 1896 Games. Of the 22 different nations that had competed at least once in the event before 1952, 19 competed in Helsinki (only Greece, Mexico, and the Netherlands were missing among the nations having previously competed).

== Competition format ==
The gymnastics format continued to use the aggregation format. Each nation entered a team of between five and eight gymnasts or up to three individual gymnasts. All entrants in the gymnastics competitions performed both a compulsory exercise and a voluntary exercise for each apparatus. The 2 exercise scores were summed to give a total for the apparatus.

No separate finals were contested.

For each exercise, four judges gave scores from 0 to 10 in one-tenth point increments. The top and bottom scores were discarded and the remaining two scores averaged to give the exercise total. Thus, exercise scores ranged from 0 to 10 and apparatus scores from 0 to 20.

The competitor had the option to make a second try only on the compulsory exercise—with the second attempt counting regardless of whether it was better than the first.

== Schedule ==
All times are Eastern European Summer Time (UTC+3)

Date	Time	Round
Saturday, 19 July 1952; Sunday, 20 July 1952; Monday, 21 July 1952	7:30; 8:00; 8:00	Final

== Results ==
Rank	Gymnast	Nation	Compulsory	Voluntary	Total
1st place, gold medalist(s)	Viktor Chukarin	Soviet Union	9.70	9.80	19.50
2nd place, silver medalist(s)	Yevgeny Korolkov	Soviet Union	9.75	9.65	19.40
2nd place, silver medalist(s)	Hrant Shahinyan	Soviet Union	9.90	9.50	19.40
4	Mikhail Perelman	Soviet Union	9.70	9.60	19.30
5	Josef Stalder	Switzerland	9.65	9.55	19.20
6	Hans Sauter	Austria	9.60	9.55	19.15
7	Vladimir Belyakov	Soviet Union	9.60	9.50	19.10
8	Heikki Savolainen	Finland	9.55	9.50	19.05
8	Jean Tschabold	Switzerland	9.55	9.50	19.05
10	József Fekete	Hungary	9.55	9.45	19.00
11	Helmut Bantz	Germany	9.40	9.55	18.95
12	Jakob Kiefer	Germany	9.45	9.45	18.90
13	Jack Günthard	Switzerland	9.50	9.35	18.85
13	Melchior Thalmann	Switzerland	9.45	9.40	18.85
15	Iosif Berdiev	Soviet Union	9.55	9.25	18.80
15	Friedel Overwien	Germany	9.55	9.25	18.80
15	Zdeněk Růžička	Czechoslovakia	9.45	9.35	18.80
18	Adalbert Dickhut	Germany	9.60	9.15	18.75
18	Berndt Lindfors	Finland	9.45	9.30	18.75
20	Sándor Réthy	Hungary	9.55	9.15	18.70
21	Hans Pfann	Germany	9.40	9.25	18.65
22	Bill Roetzheim	United States	9.25	9.35	18.60
22	Lajos Sántha	Hungary	9.25	9.35	18.60
22	Josef Škvor	Czechoslovakia	9.30	9.30	18.60
25	Hans Eugster	Switzerland	9.25	9.30	18.55
25	Ernst Gebendinger	Switzerland	9.35	9.20	18.55
25	Károly Kocsis	Hungary	9.45	9.10	18.55
28	Kalevi Viskari	Finland	9.10	9.40	18.50
29	Kaino Lempinen	Finland	9.15	9.30	18.45
29	Leo Sotorník	Czechoslovakia	9.30	9.15	18.45
31	Takashi Ono	Japan	9.40	9.00	18.40
32	Don Holder	United States	9.10	9.20	18.30
32	Ferenc Kemény	Hungary	9.35	8.95	18.30
32	Michel Mathiot	France	9.15	9.15	18.30
32	Valentin Muratov	Soviet Union	9.70	8.60	18.30
36	Ferdinand Daniš	Czechoslovakia	9.55	8.70	18.25
37	Guido Figone	Italy	9.40	8.80	18.20
37	Nikolay Milev	Bulgaria	9.40	8.80	18.20
37	Theo Wied	Germany	9.50	8.70	18.20
40	Paavo Aaltonen	Finland	8.40	9.70	18.10
40	Ed Scrobe	United States	9.30	8.80	18.10
40	Josy Stoffel	Luxembourg	9.30	8.80	18.10
43	Kalevi Laitinen	Finland	9.05	9.00	18.05
43	Frank Turner	Great Britain	9.05	9.00	18.05
43	Erich Wied	Germany	8.80	9.25	18.05
43	Luigi Zanetti	Italy	9.35	8.70	18.05
47	Poul Jessen	Denmark	8.90	9.10	18.00
47	Tadao Uesako	Japan	9.15	8.85	18.00
49	Georges Floquet	France	9.00	8.95	17.95
49	Franz Kemter	Austria	9.05	8.90	17.95
51	Vincent D'Autorio	United States	8.85	9.05	17.90
51	Szymon Sobala	Poland	9.40	8.50	17.90
53	Raymond Badin	France	8.50	9.35	17.85
53	Josef Svoboda	Czechoslovakia	9.30	8.55	17.85
55	Andrei Kerekes	Romania	9.00	8.80	17.80
56	Paweł Gaca	Poland	8.80	9.00	17.80
57	Silvio Brivio	Italy	9.05	8.70	17.75
57	Miloš Kolejka	Czechoslovakia	9.25	8.50	17.75
57	Ferenc Pataki	Hungary	9.35	8.40	17.75
57	Olavi Rove	Finland	8.60	9.15	17.75
57	Quinto Vadi	Italy	8.90	8.85	17.75
57	Ali Zaky	Egypt	8.85	8.90	17.75
63	Fabio Bonacina	Italy	9.20	8.50	17.70
63	Paweł Gawron	Poland	8.95	8.75	17.70
65	Freddy Jensen	Denmark	8.50	9.10	17.60
65	Vasil Konstantinov	Bulgaria	8.50	9.10	17.60
65	Alfred Schwarzmann	Germany	9.20	8.40	17.60
65	André Weingand	France	8.85	8.75	17.60
69	Hans Friedrich	Austria	9.35	8.20	17.55
69	Bob Stout	United States	8.75	8.80	17.55
69	Masao Takemoto	Japan	8.90	8.65	17.55
69	Jack Whitford	Great Britain	9.05	8.50	17.55
73	Walter Blattmann	United States	8.90	8.60	17.50
73	Onni Lappalainen	Finland	9.00	8.50	17.50
73	Orlando Polmonari	Italy	9.00	8.50	17.50
73	Volmer Thomsen	Denmark	8.80	8.70	17.50
77	Vladimír Kejř	Czechoslovakia	8.60	8.85	17.45
77	Rafael Lecuona	Cuba	9.15	8.30	17.45
77	Jindřich Mikulec	Czechoslovakia	8.80	8.65	17.45
77	Littorio Sampieri	Italy	8.60	8.85	17.45
77	Mincho Todorov	Bulgaria	8.95	8.50	17.45
82	Nikolay Atanasov	Bulgaria	8.95	8.30	17.25
82	Akitomo Kaneko	Japan	9.35	7.90	17.25
84	Tetsumi Nabeya	Japan	8.20	9.00	17.20
84	Lajos Tóth	Hungary	8.20	9.00	17.20
84	Ernst Wister	Austria	8.70	8.50	17.20
87	Willi Welt	Austria	8.25	8.85	17.10
88	Jack Beckner	United States	8.40	8.60	17.00
88	Hans Schwarzentruber	Switzerland	9.00	8.00	17.00
90	Ernst Fivian	Switzerland	9.35	7.50	16.85
91	Frederic Orendi	Romania	8.80	8.00	16.80
92	Erich Peters	Sweden	8.25	8.50	16.75
92	Ragai Youssef	Egypt	8.35	8.40	16.75
94	Arthur Schmitt	Saar	8.20	8.35	16.55
95	Paweł Świętek	Poland	8.05	8.45	16.50
96	Marcel de Wolf	France	7.90	8.55	16.45
97	Arrigo Carnoli	Italy	8.40	8.00	16.40
97	Magne Kleiven	Norway	8.35	8.05	16.40
97	János Mogyorósi-Klencs	Hungary	7.40	9.00	16.40
100	Armand Huberty	Luxembourg	8.65	7.65	16.30
101	Joaquín Blume	Spain	8.00	8.25	16.25
101	Mihai Botez	Romania	7.75	8.50	16.25
101	Ken Buffin	Great Britain	8.50	7.75	16.25
104	Dušan Furlan	Yugoslavia	8.35	7.85	16.20
104	Alf Nørgaard	Norway	8.70	7.50	16.20
106	Mahmoud Mohamed Reda	Egypt	8.10	8.00	16.10
106	Charles Simms	United States	8.05	8.05	16.10
108	Zdzisław Lesiński	Poland	8.50	7.55	16.05
109	Ángel Aguiar	Cuba	8.35	7.60	15.95
109	Heinz Ostheimer	Saar	8.85	7.10	15.95
111	René Changeat	France	7.90	8.00	15.90
111	Todor Todorov	Bulgaria	7.70	8.20	15.90
113	Manuel Prazeres	Portugal	8.80	7.00	15.80
114	Antun Kropivšek	Yugoslavia	7.85	7.85	15.70
114	Jerzy Solarz	Poland	7.80	7.90	15.70
116	Dimitar Yordanov	Bulgaria	7.00	8.55	15.55
117	Børge Nielsen	Denmark	8.30	7.20	15.50
118	Jean Guillou	France	7.50	7.95	15.45
118	Børge Minerth	Denmark	7.90	7.55	15.45
120	Paul Grubenthal	Austria	8.15	7.25	15.40
121	Frederik De Waele	Belgium	8.00	7.35	15.35
121	Fred Wiedersporn	Saar	7.85	7.50	15.35
123	Arne Knudsen	Norway	7.90	7.40	15.30
123	Ernst Madland	Norway	7.05	8.25	15.30
125	Wolfgang Girardi	Austria	7.55	7.70	15.25
125	Mathias Jamtvedt	Norway	7.70	7.55	15.25
127	Juan Caviglia	Argentina	7.45	7.70	15.15
127	Iliya Topalov	Bulgaria	9.15	6.00	15.15
129	Ivica Jelić	Yugoslavia	7.65	7.40	15.05
129	Ronnie Lombard	South Africa	7.80	7.25	15.05
129	George Weedon	Great Britain	7.45	7.60	15.05
129	Kurt Wigartz	Sweden	8.25	6.80	15.05
133	Gunnar Pedersen	Denmark	7.75	7.00	14.75
134	Odd Lie	Norway	8.80	5.90	14.70
135	Karel Janež	Yugoslavia	6.30	8.35	14.65
136	Carol Bedö	Romania	6.85	7.75	14.60
137	Rolf Lauer	Saar	8.05	6.25	14.30
138	Jey Kugeler	Luxembourg	6.00	8.20	14.20
139	Alf Olsen	Norway	7.25	6.90	14.15
140	Arne Carlsson	Sweden	7.95	6.15	14.10
140	Bjarne Jørgensen	Denmark	7.20	6.90	14.10
142	Eugen Balint	Romania	6.50	7.50	14.00
143	Hubert Erang	Luxembourg	7.80	6.00	13.80
144	Zoltan Balogh	Romania	6.50	7.25	13.75
144	Georg Johansen	Norway	5.85	7.90	13.75
144	Ede Mađar	Yugoslavia	6.50	7.25	13.75
147	Marcel Coppin	Luxembourg	7.30	6.40	13.70
147	Raymond Dot	France	4.75	8.95	13.70
147	Ahmed Khalil El-Giddawi	Egypt	6.25	7.45	13.70
150	Ivan Čaklec	Yugoslavia	5.10	8.50	13.60
150	Walter Müller	Saar	7.60	6.00	13.60
152	Mohamed Sayed Hamdi	Egypt	5.50	7.85	13.35
152	Nils Sjöberg	Sweden	6.35	7.00	13.35
152	Sreten Stefanović	Yugoslavia	7.85	5.50	13.35
155	Ryszard Kucjas	Poland	6.50	6.80	13.30
156	Norbert Dietrich	Saar	7.50	5.65	13.15
157	António Leite	Portugal	6.10	6.75	12.85
158	Jerzy Jokiel	Poland	7.30	5.50	12.80
158	Jeroom Riske	Belgium	6.15	6.65	12.80
160	Anders Lindh	Sweden	6.15	6.45	12.60
161	Peter Starling	Great Britain	6.10	6.30	12.40
162	Friedrich Fetz	Austria	5.25	7.00	12.25
162	Rolf Yelseth	South Africa	7.00	5.25	12.25
164	Dmytro Leonkin	Soviet Union	3.75	8.35	12.10
165	Francisc Cocis	Romania	5.25	6.80	12.05
166	William Thoresson	Sweden	5.75	6.00	11.75
167	Manuel Gouveia	Portugal	6.80	4.85	11.65
168	Jack Wells	South Africa	6.80	4.75	11.55
169	Raúl Caldeira	Portugal	5.70	5.75	11.45
170	Graham Harcourt	Great Britain	6.85	4.50	11.35
171	Joaquim Granger	Portugal	6.05	5.25	11.30
172	Mahmoud Safwat	Egypt	4.50	6.65	11.15
173	Manuel Cardoso	Portugal	5.55	5.30	10.85
174	Franjo Jurjević	Yugoslavia	5.00	5.80	10.80
175	Magdy Gheriani	Egypt	3.00	7.55	10.55
176	Maurice De Groote	Belgium	3.50	6.75	10.25
177	César Bonoris	Argentina	3.00	7.05	10.05
178	Börje Stattin	Sweden	9.00	1.00	10.00
179	Francisco Cascante	Cuba	4.50	5.25	9.75
180	Aurel Losnita	Romania	4.75	4.50	9.25
181	Stoyan Stoyanov	Bulgaria	9.15	–	9.15
182	Ahmed Issam Allam	Egypt	3.50	4.75	8.25
182	René Schroeder	Luxembourg	4.75	3.50	8.25
184	Vir Singh	India	1.00	2.25	3.25
185	Khushi Ram	India	1.00	2.00	3.00
