= Gymnastics at the 1952 Summer Olympics – Men's rings =

Olympic gymnastics event

Men's rings at the Games of the XV Olympiad
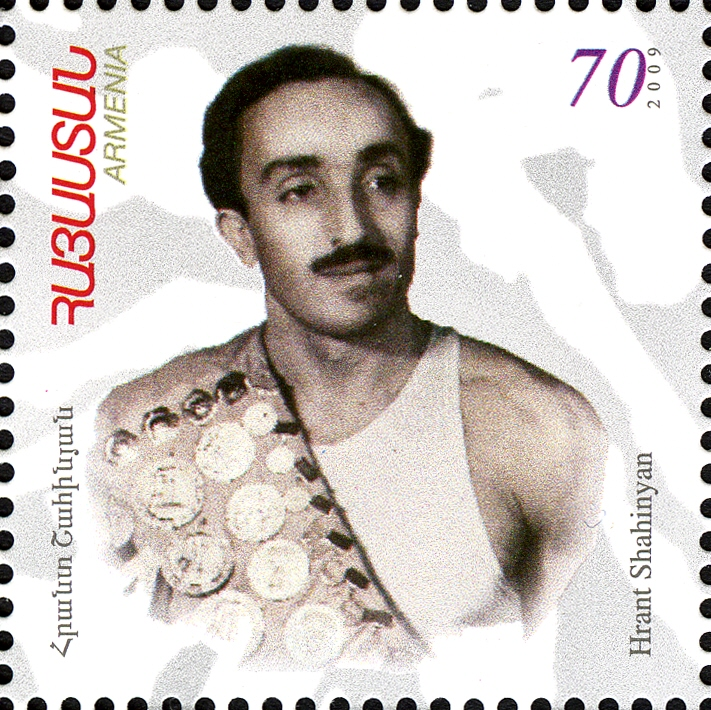
- Hrant Shahinyan depicted on Armenian stamp
- Venue: Töölö Sports Hall, Exhibition Hall I
- Dates: 19–21 July 1952
- Competitors: 185 from 29 nations
- Winning score: 19.75

Medalists
1st place, gold medalist(s)		Hrant Shahinyan; Soviet Union
2nd place, silver medalist(s)		Viktor Chukarin; Soviet Union
3rd place, bronze medalist(s)		Hans Eugster; Switzerland
3rd place, bronze medalist(s)		Dmytro Leonkin; Soviet Union

The men's rings competition at the 1952 Summer Olympics was held at Töölö Sports Hall, Exhibition Hall I from 19 to 21 July. It was the eighth appearance of the event. There were 185 competitors from 29 nations, with each nation sending up to 8 gymnasts. The Soviet Union, in its debut in the event, won a medal of every color but did not quite sweep the medals as there was a tie for third. Hrant Shahinyan was the winner, Viktor Chukarin took silver, and Dmytro Leonkin shared bronze with Hans Eugster of Switzerland.

== Background ==
This was the eighth appearance of the event, which is one of the five apparatus events held every time there were apparatus events at the Summer Olympics (no apparatus events were held in 1900, 1908, 1912, or 1920). Four of the top 10 gymnasts from 1948 returned: bronze medalist Zdeněk Růžička of Czechoslovakia, fifth-place finisher Josef Stalder of Switzerland, and eighth-place finisher Heikki Savolainen (who had also been in the top 10 in 1932 and 1936) and ninth-place finisher Olavi Rove of Finland. The reigning (1950) world champion, Walter Lehmann of Switzerland, was not competing in Helsinki. Rove had taken second, with Hans Eugster third.

Belgium, India, Norway, Poland, Portugal, Saar, South Africa, the Soviet Union, Spain, and Sweden each made their debut in the men's rings. The United States made its seventh appearance, most of any nation, having missed only the inaugural 1896 Games. Of the 22 different nations that had competed at least once in the event before 1952, 19 competed in Helsinki (only Greece, Mexico, and the Netherlands were missing among the nations having previously competed).

== Competition format ==
The gymnastics format continued to use the aggregation format. Each nation entered a team of between five and eight gymnasts or up to three individual gymnasts. All entrants in the gymnastics competitions performed both a compulsory exercise and a voluntary exercise for each apparatus. The 2 exercise scores were summed to give a total for the apparatus.

No separate finals were contested.

For each exercise, four judges gave scores from 0 to 10 in one-tenth point increments. The top and bottom scores were discarded and the remaining two scores averaged to give the exercise total. Thus, exercise scores ranged from 0 to 10 and apparatus scores from 0 to 20.

The competitor had the option to make a second try only on the compulsory exercise—with the second attempt counting regardless of whether it was better than the first.

== Schedule ==
All times are Eastern European Summer Time (UTC+3)

Date	Time	Round
Saturday, 19 July 1952; Sunday, 20 July 1952; Monday, 21 July 1952	7:30; 8:00; 8:00	Final

== Results ==
Rank	Gymnast	Nation	Compulsory	Voluntary	Total
1st place, gold medalist(s)	Hrant Shahinyan	Soviet Union	9.80	9.95	19.75
2nd place, silver medalist(s)	Viktor Chukarin	Soviet Union	9.65	9.90	19.55
3rd place, bronze medalist(s)	Hans Eugster	Switzerland	9.60	9.80	19.40
3rd place, bronze medalist(s)	Dmytro Leonkin	Soviet Union	9.55	9.85	19.40
5	Valentin Muratov	Soviet Union	9.45	9.90	19.35
6	Masao Takemoto	Japan	9.40	9.80	19.20
7	Ferenc Kemény	Hungary	9.45	9.70	19.15
7	Yevgeny Korolkov	Soviet Union	9.45	9.70	19.15
7	Berndt Lindfors	Finland	9.40	9.75	19.15
7	Ali Zaky	Egypt	9.45	9.70	19.15
11	Iosif Berdiev	Soviet Union	9.50	9.60	19.10
11	Josef Stalder	Switzerland	9.45	9.65	19.10
13	Mikhail Perelman	Soviet Union	9.35	9.70	19.05
14	Helmut Bantz	Germany	9.35	9.60	18.95
14	Vladimir Belyakov	Soviet Union	9.25	9.70	18.95
14	Onni Lappalainen	Finland	9.30	9.65	18.95
14	Zdeněk Růžička	Czechoslovakia	9.45	9.50	18.95
18	Hans Pfann	Germany	9.40	9.50	18.90
19	Ferdinand Daniš	Czechoslovakia	9.45	9.40	18.85
19	Akitomo Kaneko	Japan	9.40	9.45	18.85
19	Heikki Savolainen	Finland	9.40	9.45	18.85
22	Vladimír Kejř	Czechoslovakia	9.40	9.40	18.80
23	Josef Škvor	Czechoslovakia	9.40	9.35	18.75
23	Josef Svoboda	Czechoslovakia	9.30	9.45	18.75
23	Jean Tschabold	Switzerland	9.15	9.60	18.75
26	Raymond Dot	France	9.30	9.40	18.70
26	Jack Günthard	Switzerland	9.15	9.55	18.70
26	Josy Stoffel	Luxembourg	9.35	9.35	18.70
29	Vasil Konstantinov	Bulgaria	9.15	9.50	18.65
29	Olavi Rove	Finland	9.30	9.35	18.65
29	Lajos Sántha	Hungary	9.20	9.45	18.65
32	Ferenc Pataki	Hungary	9.10	9.50	18.60
32	Hans Sauter	Austria	9.30	9.30	18.60
34	Guido Figone	Italy	9.45	9.10	18.55
35	Mihai Botez	Romania	9.15	9.35	18.50
35	Károly Kocsis	Hungary	9.15	9.35	18.50
Iliya Topalov	Bulgaria	9.30	9.20	18.50	
38	Paavo Aaltonen	Finland	9.05	9.40	18.45
38	Joaquín Blume	Spain	9.20	9.25	18.45
38	Littorio Sampieri	Italy	9.25	9.20	18.45
38	Hans Schwarzentruber	Switzerland	9.15	9.30	18.45
38	Leo Sotorník	Czechoslovakia	9.20	9.25	18.45
38	Mincho Todorov	Bulgaria	9.35	9.10	18.45
38	Dimitar Yordanov	Bulgaria	9.20	9.25	18.45
45	Adalbert Dickhut	Germany	9.05	9.35	18.40
45	Friedel Overwien	Germany	9.10	9.30	18.40
45	Ed Scrobe	United States	9.35	9.05	18.40
45	Bob Stout	United States	9.20	9.20	18.40
45	Theo Wied	Germany	9.00	9.40	18.40
50	József Fekete	Hungary	8.95	9.40	18.35
50	Tadao Uesako	Japan	9.00	9.35	18.35
50	Erich Wied	Germany	9.00	9.35	18.35
53	Andrei Kerekes	Romania	9.00	9.30	18.30
53	Ernst Fivian	Switzerland	8.95	9.35	18.30
53	Zdzisław Lesiński	Poland	9.35	8.95	18.30
53	János Mogyorósi-Klencs	Hungary	8.95	9.35	18.30
53	Melchior Thalmann	Switzerland	8.80	9.50	18.30
58	Nikolay Milev	Bulgaria	9.10	9.15	18.25
58	Børge Minerth	Denmark	9.05	9.20	18.25
58	Alfred Schwarzmann	Germany	9.00	9.25	18.25
61	Jindřich Mikulec	Czechoslovakia	9.25	8.95	18.20
61	Frank Turner	Great Britain	9.15	9.05	18.20
63	Fabio Bonacina	Italy	9.15	9.00	18.15
63	Freddy Jensen	Denmark	8.90	9.25	18.15
63	Kaino Lempinen	Finland	8.85	9.30	18.15
63	Takashi Ono	Japan	8.95	9.20	18.15
67	Ahmed Issam Allam	Egypt	8.90	9.15	18.05
67	Sreten Stefanović	Yugoslavia	8.85	9.20	18.05
69	Tetsumi Nabeya	Japan	8.70	9.30	18.00
69	Børge Nielsen	Denmark	8.95	9.05	18.00
69	Szymon Sobala	Poland	9.15	8.85	18.00
72	Nikolay Atanasov	Bulgaria	9.15	8.80	17.95
73	Jakob Kiefer	Germany	8.70	9.20	17.90
73	Kalevi Laitinen	Finland	8.60	9.30	17.90
73	Alf Nørgaard	Norway	9.00	8.90	17.90
73	Paweł Świętek	Poland	9.20	8.70	17.90
77	Miloš Kolejka	Czechoslovakia	8.45	9.40	17.85
77	Ernst Wister	Austria	8.80	9.05	17.85
79	Raymond Badin	France	8.75	9.05	17.80
79	Magne Kleiven	Norway	8.80	9.00	17.80
79	Odd Lie	Norway	8.95	8.85	17.80
79	Sándor Réthy	Hungary	8.60	9.20	17.80
79	Volmer Thomsen	Denmark	8.90	8.90	17.80
84	Georg Johansen	Norway	8.80	8.95	17.75
84	Orlando Polmonari	Italy	8.85	8.90	17.75
86	Ernst Gebendinger	Switzerland	8.50	9.20	17.70
87	Silvio Brivio	Italy	8.70	8.95	17.65
87	Arthur Schmitt	Saar	8.65	9.00	17.65
89	Jack Whitford	Great Britain	8.95	8.65	17.60
90	Magdy Gheriani	Egypt	8.60	8.90	17.50
90	Poul Jessen	Denmark	8.35	9.15	17.50
90	Michel Mathiot	France	8.90	8.60	17.50
90	Kalevi Viskari	Finland	8.30	9.20	17.50
94	Ken Buffin	Great Britain	8.70	8.75	17.45
94	Norbert Dietrich	Saar	8.90	8.55	17.45
94	Mathias Jamtvedt	Norway	8.75	8.70	17.45
94	Bjarne Jørgensen	Denmark	8.50	8.95	17.45
94	Frederic Orendi	Romania	8.50	8.95	17.45
94	Todor Todorov	Bulgaria	8.80	8.65	17.45
100	Anders Lindh	Sweden	8.45	8.95	17.40
100	Alf Olsen	Norway	8.80	8.60	17.40
102	Ryszard Kucjas	Poland	9.00	8.35	17.35
102	Lajos Tóth	Hungary	8.25	9.10	17.35
104	Wolfgang Girardi	Austria	8.10	9.05	17.15
104	Jey Kugeler	Luxembourg	8.40	8.75	17.15
106	Arne Knudsen	Norway	8.75	8.35	17.10
107	Joaquim Granger	Portugal	8.00	9.05	17.05
108	Luigi Zanetti	Italy	7.95	9.00	16.95
109	Ángel Aguiar	Cuba	7.85	9.05	16.90
109	Don Holder	United States	8.70	8.20	16.90
111	Ernst Madland	Norway	8.20	8.65	16.85
111	Quinto Vadi	Italy	7.85	9.00	16.85
111	André Weingand	France	8.00	8.85	16.85
114	Zoltan Balogh	Romania	7.85	8.95	16.80
114	Heinz Ostheimer	Saar	8.35	8.45	16.80
116	George Weedon	Great Britain	8.30	8.45	16.75
117	Paweł Gawron	Poland	8.70	8.00	16.70
117	Aurel Losnita	Romania	7.80	8.90	16.70
119	Francisc Cocis	Romania	8.10	8.55	16.65
119	Mahmoud Safwat	Egypt	7.80	8.85	16.65
121	Dušan Furlan	Yugoslavia	7.80	8.60	16.40
121	Rafael Lecuona	Cuba	7.95	8.45	16.40
121	René Schroeder	Luxembourg	7.85	8.55	16.40
124	Maurice De Groote	Belgium	8.10	8.25	16.35
125	Arrigo Carnoli	Italy	7.65	8.60	16.25
125	Frederik De Waele	Belgium	8.35	7.90	16.25
127	Gunnar Pedersen	Denmark	7.75	8.40	16.15
127	Charles Simms	United States	8.35	7.80	16.15
127	Rolf Yelseth	South Africa	7.65	8.50	16.15
130	Armand Huberty	Luxembourg	7.75	8.35	16.10
131	Jerzy Jokiel	Poland	8.00	8.00	16.00
131	Eugen Balint	Romania	8.25	7.75	16.00
131	Georges Floquet	France	7.85	8.15	16.00
131	Manuel Gouveia	Portugal	7.65	8.35	16.00
131	Peter Starling	Great Britain	8.35	7.65	16.00
136	Juan Caviglia	Argentina	7.85	8.10	15.95
137	Walter Blattmann	United States	8.20	7.70	15.90
137	Marcel de Wolf	France	7.70	8.20	15.90
137	Ivica Jelić	Yugoslavia	7.95	7.95	15.90
137	Antun Kropivšek	Yugoslavia	8.05	7.85	15.90
137	Willi Welt	Austria	7.70	8.20	15.90
142	Jean Guillou	France	7.25	8.60	15.85
142	Bill Roetzheim	United States	7.90	7.95	15.85
144	César Bonoris	Argentina	8.05	7.75	15.80
145	Börje Stattin	Sweden	7.00	8.75	15.75
146	Marcel Coppin	Luxembourg	7.50	8.20	15.70
147	Jack Wells	South Africa	7.40	8.25	15.65
148	Franz Kemter	Austria	7.20	8.35	15.55
148	Graham Harcourt	Great Britain	8.45	7.10	15.55
148	Ede Mađar	Yugoslavia	8.05	7.50	15.55
151	Walter Müller	Saar	7.55	7.90	15.45
152	Ahmed Khalil El-Giddawi	Egypt	7.70	7.70	15.40
153	Francisco Cascante	Cuba	7.00	8.35	15.35
154	Friedrich Fetz	Austria	7.55	7.75	15.30
154	Jerzy Solarz	Poland	6.95	8.35	15.30
156	Franjo Jurjević	Yugoslavia	6.80	8.45	15.25
157	Vincent D'Autorio	United States	7.85	7.35	15.20
157	Hubert Erang	Luxembourg	7.10	8.10	15.20
159	António Leite	Portugal	7.15	8.00	15.15
160	Jack Beckner	United States	7.10	8.00	15.10
161	Erich Peters	Sweden	6.85	8.10	14.95
162	William Thoresson	Sweden	7.25	7.65	14.90
163	Carol Bedö	Romania	6.80	7.90	14.70
163	Ronnie Lombard	South Africa	6.70	8.00	14.70
165	Rolf Lauer	Saar	7.40	7.25	14.65
166	Mohamed Sayed Hamdi	Egypt	6.90	7.65	14.55
167	Arne Carlsson	Sweden	6.70	7.60	14.30
168	Paul Grubenthal	Austria	5.50	8.60	14.10
169	Jeroom Riske	Belgium	7.00	6.95	13.95
170	Ivan Čaklec	Yugoslavia	6.00	7.90	13.90
171	Kurt Wigartz	Sweden	6.50	7.10	13.60
172	Nils Sjöberg	Sweden	6.15	7.10	13.25
173	René Changeat	France	4.75	8.45	13.20
174	Karel Janež	Yugoslavia	5.85	7.20	13.05
175	Ragai Youssef	Egypt	5.90	7.10	13.00
176	Fred Wiedersporn	Saar	5.40	7.35	12.75
177	Manuel Prazeres	Portugal	4.85	7.75	12.60
178	Raúl Caldeira	Portugal	3.50	7.60	11.10
179	Mahmoud Mohamed Reda	Egypt	4.00	7.00	11.00
180	Paweł Gaca	Poland	2.00	8.35	10.35
181	Manuel Cardoso	Portugal	2.00	7.80	9.80
182	Stoyan Stoyanov	Bulgaria	9.40	—	9.40
183	Hans Friedrich	Austria	7.75	—	7.75
184	Vir Singh	India	1.25	4.00	5.25
185	Khushi Ram	India	2.00	3.00	5.00
