= Gymnastics at the 1952 Summer Olympics – Men's horizontal bar =

Olympic gymnastics event

Men's horizontal bar at the Games of the XV Olympiad
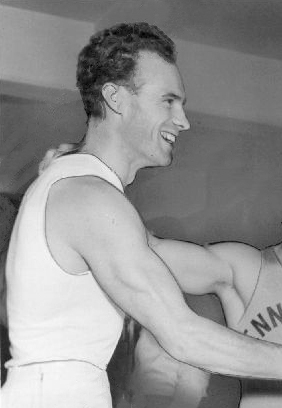
- Jack Günthard (1956)
- Venue: Töölö Sports Hall Exhibition Hall I
- Dates: 19–21 July 1952
- Competitors: 185 from 29 nations
- Winning score: 19.55

Medalists
1st place, gold medalist(s)		Jack Günthard; Switzerland
2nd place, silver medalist(s)		Alfred Schwarzmann; Germany
2nd place, silver medalist(s)		Josef Stalder; Switzerland

The men's horizontal bar competition at the 1952 Summer Olympics was held at Töölö Sports Hall, Exhibition Hall I from 19 to 21 July. It was the eighth appearance of the event. There were 185 competitors from 29 nations, with each nation sending up to 8 gymnasts. The event was won by Jack Günthard of Switzerland, the nation's second consecutive and third overall victory in the horizontal bar, breaking a tie with the United States for most all-time. Switzerland also took one of the silver medals, as Josef Stalder tied with Alfred Schwarzmann of Germany, competing at the age of 40, for second. Stalder and Schwarzmann were the first two men to win multiple horizontal bars medals; Stalder had won the event in 1948 and Schwarzmann had earned bronze in 1936.

== Background ==
This was the eighth appearance of the event, which is one of the five apparatus events held every time there were apparatus events at the Summer Olympics (no apparatus events were held in 1900, 1908, 1912, or 1920). Four of the top 10 gymnasts from 1948 returned: gold medalist Josef Stalder of Switzerland, fourth-place finishers Raymond Dot of France and Lajos Sántha of Hungary, and ninth-place finisher Lajos Tóth of Hungary. 1936 bronze medalist Alfred Schwarzmann of Germany (unable to compete in 1948 due to the exclusion of the World War II aggressor nations) also returned. Hans Eugster of Switzerland was the reigning (1950) world champion; Dot had finished third after Eugster and Olavi Rove of Finland.

Belgium, India, Norway, Poland, Portugal, Saar, South Africa, the Soviet Union, Spain, and Sweden each made their debut in the men's horizontal bar. The United States made its seventh appearance, most of any nation, having missed only the inaugural 1896 Games. Of the 22 different nations that had competed at least once in the event before 1952, 19 competed in Helsinki (only Greece, Mexico, and the Netherlands were missing among the nations having previously competed).

== Competition format ==
The gymnastics format continued to use the aggregation format. Each nation entered a team of between five and eight gymnasts or up to three individual gymnasts. All entrants in the gymnastics competitions performed both a compulsory exercise and a voluntary exercise for each apparatus. The 2 exercise scores were summed to give a total for the apparatus.

No separate finals were contested.

For each exercise, four judges gave scores from 0 to 10 in one-tenth point increments. The top and bottom scores were discarded and the remaining two scores averaged to give the exercise total. Thus, exercise scores ranged from 0 to 10 and apparatus scores from 0 to 20.

The competitor had the option to make a second try only on the compulsory exercise—with the second attempt counting regardless of whether it was better than the first.

== Schedule ==
All times are Eastern European Summer Time (UTC+3)

Date	Time	Round
Saturday, 19 July 1952; Sunday, 20 July 1952; Monday, 21 July 1952	7:30; 8:00; 8:00	Final

== Results ==
Rank	Gymnast	Nation	Compulsory	Voluntary	Total
1st place, gold medalist(s)	Jack Günthard	Switzerland	9.75	9.80	19.55
2nd place, silver medalist(s)	Josef Stalder	Switzerland	9.65	9.85	19.50
2nd place, silver medalist(s)	Alfred Schwarzmann	Germany	9.70	9.80	19.50
4	Heikki Savolainen	Finland	9.75	9.70	19.45
5	Viktor Chukarin	Soviet Union	9.60	9.80	19.40
6	Jean Tschabold	Switzerland	9.65	9.70	19.35
7	Helmut Bantz	Germany	9.65	9.60	19.25
7	Melchior Thalmann	Switzerland	9.65	9.60	19.25
9	Berndt Lindfors	Finland	9.60	9.60	19.20
9	Valentin Muratov	Soviet Union	9.65	9.55	19.20
11	Paavo Aaltonen	Finland	9.55	9.60	19.15
11	Hans Eugster	Switzerland	9.65	9.50	19.15
11	Kalevi Viskari	Finland	9.60	9.55	19.15
14	Hrant Shahinyan	Soviet Union	9.45	9.60	19.05
14	Erich Wied	Germany	9.60	9.45	19.05
16	Charles Simms	United States	9.45	9.55	19.00
17	Bill Roetzheim	United States	9.60	9.35	18.95
17	Masao Takemoto	Japan	9.35	9.60	18.95
19	Akitomo Kaneko	Japan	9.50	9.40	18.90
19	Tetsumi Nabeya	Japan	9.30	9.60	18.90
19	Takashi Ono	Japan	9.45	9.45	18.90
19	Ed Scrobe	United States	9.50	9.40	18.90
23	Vladimir Belyakov	Soviet Union	9.25	9.55	18.80
23	Yevgeny Korolkov	Soviet Union	9.35	9.45	18.80
23	Kaino Lempinen	Finland	9.40	9.40	18.80
23	Olavi Rove	Finland	9.40	9.40	18.80
23	Lajos Sántha	Hungary	9.40	9.40	18.80
28	Onni Lappalainen	Finland	9.40	9.35	18.75
29	Mikhail Perelman	Soviet Union	9.30	9.40	18.70
29	Hans Sauter	Austria	9.30	9.40	18.70
31	Ferenc Pataki	Hungary	9.40	9.25	18.65
32	Ernst Gebendinger	Switzerland	9.65	8.95	18.60
32	Börje Stattin	Sweden	9.20	9.40	18.60
32	Theo Wied	Germany	9.45	9.15	18.60
35	Kalevi Laitinen	Finland	9.75	8.80	18.55
35	Bob Stout	United States	9.25	9.30	18.55
35	Tadao Uesako	Japan	9.05	9.50	18.55
38	Iosif Berdiev	Soviet Union	9.20	9.30	18.50
38	Jakob Kiefer	Germany	9.45	9.05	18.50
40	Joaquín Blume	Spain	9.15	9.30	18.45
40	Josy Stoffel	Luxembourg	9.35	9.10	18.45
40	Lajos Tóth	Hungary	9.15	9.30	18.45
43	Raymond Dot	France	9.05	9.30	18.35
43	Dmytro Leonkin	Soviet Union	9.05	9.30	18.35
43	Mahmoud Safwat	Egypt	9.25	9.10	18.35
43	Mincho Todorov	Bulgaria	9.30	9.05	18.35
47	Zdeněk Růžička	Czechoslovakia	8.95	9.35	18.30
48	Antun Kropivšek	Yugoslavia	9.20	9.05	18.25
48	Michel Mathiot	France	8.95	9.30	18.25
48	Dimitar Yordanov	Bulgaria	9.10	9.15	18.25
51	Wolfgang Girardi	Austria	9.10	9.10	18.20
51	Frederic Orendi	Romania	9.25	8.95	18.20
51	Hans Pfann	Germany	9.60	8.60	18.20
51	Hans Schwarzentruber	Switzerland	9.35	8.85	18.20
55	Josef Svoboda	Czechoslovakia	9.35	8.80	18.15
56	Ferenc Kemény	Hungary	9.05	9.05	18.10
56	Friedel Overwien	Germany	9.35	8.75	18.10
58	Jindřich Mikulec	Czechoslovakia	9.20	8.85	18.05
59	Jack Beckner	United States	9.10	8.90	18.00
60	Guido Figone	Italy	9.05	8.90	17.95
61	Ferdinand Daniš	Czechoslovakia	9.10	8.80	17.90
61	Bjarne Jørgensen	Denmark	9.25	8.65	17.90
63	Alf Olsen	Norway	8.85	9.00	17.85
63	Szymon Sobala	Poland	8.80	9.05	17.85
63	Ernst Wister	Austria	8.60	9.25	17.85
66	Ken Buffin	Great Britain	9.45	8.35	17.80
67	Paweł Gaca	Poland	9.05	8.70	17.75
67	Freddy Jensen	Denmark	8.70	9.05	17.75
67	Miloš Kolejka	Czechoslovakia	9.15	8.60	17.75
70	Ahmed Issam Allam	Egypt	8.75	8.95	17.70
70	Vladimír Kejř	Czechoslovakia	8.80	8.90	17.70
70	János Mogyorósi-Klencs	Hungary	9.00	8.70	17.70
73	Paul Grubenthal	Austria	9.00	8.65	17.65
73	Armand Huberty	Luxembourg	8.65	9.00	17.65
75	Adalbert Dickhut	Germany	7.95	9.65	17.60
75	Poul Jessen	Denmark	8.80	8.80	17.60
75	Leo Sotorník	Czechoslovakia	9.05	8.55	17.60
78	Károly Kocsis	Hungary	9.25	8.30	17.55
79	René Changeat	France	8.60	8.85	17.45
79	Ernst Fivian	Switzerland	8.10	9.35	17.45
79	Paweł Gawron	Poland	9.05	8.40	17.45
79	Nils Sjöberg	Sweden	8.90	8.55	17.45
83	Mathias Jamtvedt	Norway	8.90	8.50	17.40
83	Anders Lindh	Sweden	8.80	8.60	17.40
83	Volmer Thomsen	Denmark	8.80	8.60	17.40
86	Dušan Furlan	Yugoslavia	8.45	8.90	17.35
87	Jerzy Jokiel	Poland	9.00	8.30	17.30
87	Arthur Schmitt	Saar	9.05	8.25	17.30
89	Børge Minerth	Denmark	8.85	8.40	17.25
89	Alf Nørgaard	Norway	8.55	8.70	17.25
89	Stoyan Stoyanov	Bulgaria	9.60	7.65	17.25
92	Silvio Brivio	Italy	8.95	8.25	17.20
92	Franz Kemter	Austria	8.95	8.25	17.20
92	Sándor Réthy	Hungary	8.65	8.55	17.20
95	Børge Nielsen	Denmark	8.75	8.40	17.15
96	Arne Carlsson	Sweden	8.45	8.65	17.10
97	Don Holder	United States	9.05	8.00	17.05
98	Arne Knudsen	Norway	8.40	8.60	17.00
98	Ronnie Lombard	South Africa	8.40	8.60	17.00
100	Andrei Kerekes	Romania	8.30	8.65	16.95
100	Josef Škvor	Czechoslovakia	9.15	7.80	16.95
100	Ali Zaky	Egypt	7.65	9.30	16.95
100	Luigi Zanetti	Italy	7.80	9.15	16.95
104	Vasil Konstantinov	Bulgaria	8.55	8.35	16.90
105	Arrigo Carnoli	Italy	8.10	8.75	16.85
106	Rafael Lecuona	Cuba	8.10	8.70	16.80
106	Walter Müller	Saar	9.05	7.75	16.80
106	Frank Turner	Great Britain	8.25	8.55	16.80
109	Vincent D'Autorio	United States	8.75	8.00	16.75
109	Manuel Gouveia	Portugal	8.25	8.50	16.75
109	Georg Johansen	Norway	8.90	7.85	16.75
112	Walter Blattmann	United States	8.25	8.45	16.70
112	József Fekete	Hungary	8.65	8.05	16.70
114	Nikolay Atanasov	Bulgaria	8.20	8.45	16.65
114	Gunnar Pedersen	Denmark	8.40	8.25	16.65
116	Raymond Badin	France	7.55	9.00	16.55
117	William Thoresson	Sweden	9.30	7.20	16.50
118	Jean Guillou	France	8.45	8.00	16.45
119	Ryszard Kucjas	Poland	8.25	8.10	16.35
119	Kurt Wigartz	Sweden	8.00	8.35	16.35
121	Jey Kugeler	Luxembourg	7.80	8.50	16.30
122	Friedrich Fetz	Austria	7.80	8.45	16.25
122	Mohamed Sayed Hamdi	Egypt	8.10	8.15	16.25
124	Ahmed Khalil El-Giddawi	Egypt	7.70	8.50	16.20
124	René Schroeder	Luxembourg	7.85	8.35	16.20
126	Raúl Caldeira	Portugal	7.80	8.35	16.15
127	Marcel Coppin	Luxembourg	8.30	7.80	16.10
127	Zdzisław Lesiński	Poland	8.80	7.30	16.10
129	Nikolay Milev	Bulgaria	9.05	7.00	16.05
129	Littorio Sampieri	Italy	8.30	7.75	16.05
131	César Bonoris	Argentina	8.00	8.00	16.00
131	Hubert Erang	Luxembourg	8.20	7.80	16.00
133	Norbert Dietrich	Saar	8.85	7.10	15.95
134	Georges Floquet	France	7.35	8.55	15.90
135	Fabio Bonacina	Italy	8.95	6.90	15.85
136	Orlando Polmonari	Italy	8.20	7.55	15.75
137	Willi Welt	Austria	8.75	6.95	15.70
138	Jack Whitford	Great Britain	7.25	8.40	15.65
139	Todor Todorov	Bulgaria	8.40	7.15	15.55
140	André Weingand	France	6.50	9.00	15.50
141	Rolf Yelseth	South Africa	7.60	7.80	15.40
142	Ivica Jelić	Yugoslavia	7.20	8.10	15.30
143	Rolf Lauer	Saar	8.35	6.90	15.25
143	Fred Wiedersporn	Saar	8.00	7.25	15.25
145	Joaquim Granger	Portugal	7.65	7.55	15.20
145	Magne Kleiven	Norway	6.50	8.70	15.20
145	Erich Peters	Sweden	6.60	8.60	15.20
148	Odd Lie	Norway	7.00	8.10	15.10
148	Paweł Świętek	Poland	8.20	6.90	15.10
150	Ede Mađar	Yugoslavia	7.45	7.50	14.95
151	Juan Caviglia	Argentina	6.90	7.85	14.75
151	Franjo Jurjević	Yugoslavia	6.15	8.60	14.75
153	Quinto Vadi	Italy	6.00	8.70	14.70
154	Magdy Gheriani	Egypt	6.40	8.25	14.65
155	Frederik De Waele	Belgium	6.60	7.75	14.35
156	Graham Harcourt	Great Britain	7.80	6.45	14.25
157	Maurice De Groote	Belgium	7.10	7.00	14.10
157	George Weedon	Great Britain	8.20	5.90	14.10
159	Peter Starling	Great Britain	7.00	7.00	14.00
160	Ivan Čaklec	Yugoslavia	7.25	6.65	13.90
161	Ragai Youssef	Egypt	7.10	6.75	13.85
162	Sreten Stefanović	Yugoslavia	6.90	6.90	13.80
163	Mihai Botez	Romania	5.50	8.15	13.65
164	Karel Janež	Yugoslavia	6.50	6.60	13.10
165	Marcel de Wolf	France	6.50	6.40	12.90
166	Jack Wells	South Africa	6.45	6.10	12.55
167	Ernst Madland	Norway	2.90	8.85	11.75
168	Francisc Cocis	Romania	4.50	7.00	11.50
169	Aurel Losnita	Romania	5.30	6.10	11.40
169	Iliya Topalov	Bulgaria	6.90	4.50	11.40
171	Manuel Prazeres	Portugal	4.65	6.65	11.30
172	Eugen Balint	Romania	4.50	6.75	11.25
173	Jeroom Riske	Belgium	7.65	3.50	11.15
174	António Leite	Portugal	3.00	7.25	10.25
175	Ángel Aguiar	Cuba	4.50	5.70	10.20
176	Manuel Cardoso	Portugal	3.50	6.60	10.10
177	Heinz Ostheimer	Saar	2.00	7.80	9.80
178	Jerzy Solarz	Poland	3.25	6.25	9.50
179	Vir Singh	India	2.00	5.75	7.75
180	Carol Bedö	Romania	1.75	5.50	7.25
181	Francisco Cascante	Cuba	3.00	4.00	7.00
182	Zoltan Balogh	Romania	1.25	5.50	6.75
183	Khushi Ram	India	1.25	4.50	5.75
184	Hans Friedrich	Austria	4.00	—	4.00
185	Mahmoud Mohamed Reda	Egypt	0.50	—	0.50
