= Switzerland at the World Artistic Gymnastics Championships =

- Flag of Switzerland
- IOC code: SUI
- Website: www.stv-fsg.ch/de/
- Medals: Gold 19 Silver 16 Bronze 16 Total 51

Although Switzerland became the first country to establish a national Gymnastics federation (doing so in 1832) Swiss men did not compete at a World Championships until 1934. While women were first allowed to compete at the 1934 World Championships, Swiss women wouldn't make their debut until 1978.

When the Swiss men debuted at the World Championships, they achieved great success, winning numerous medals at their first four appearances. Ariella Käslin became the first Swiss female gymnast to win a medal at a World Championships, winning silver on vault in 2009.

== Medalists ==
Medal	Name	Year	Event
Gold	Walter Bach, Hans Grieder, Hermann Hänggi, Eugen Mack, Georges Miez, Eduard Steinemann, Josef Walter, Melchior Wezel	(Hungary) 1934 Budapest	Men's team
Gold	Eugen Mack	(Hungary) 1934 Budapest	Men's all-around
Gold	Georges Miez	(Hungary) 1934 Budapest	Men's floor exercise
Silver	Eugen Mack	(Hungary) 1934 Budapest	Men's floor exercise
Gold	Eugen Mack	(Hungary) 1934 Budapest	Men's pommel horse
Silver	Eduard Steinemann	(Hungary) 1934 Budapest	Men's pommel horse
Silver	Eugen Mack	(Hungary) 1934 Budapest	Men's rings
Gold	Eugen Mack	(Hungary) 1934 Budapest	Men's vault
Silver	Eduard Steinemann	(Hungary) 1934 Budapest	Men's vault
Gold	Eugen Mack	(Hungary) 1934 Budapest	Men's parallel bars
Silver	Josef Walter	(Hungary) 1934 Budapest	Men's parallel bars
Bronze	Walter Bach	(Hungary) 1934 Budapest	Men's parallel bars
Silver	Georges Miez	(Hungary) 1934 Budapest	Men's horizontal bar
Silver	Albert Bachmann, Walter Beck, Eugen Mack, Hans Negelin, Michael Reusch, Leo Schürmann, Smid	(Czechoslovakia) 1938 Prague	Men's team
Bronze	Eugen Mack	(Czechoslovakia) 1938 Prague	Men's all-around
Silver	Eugen Mack	(Czechoslovakia) 1938 Prague	Men's floor exercise
Gold	Michael Reusch	(Czechoslovakia) 1938 Prague	Men's pommel horse
Bronze	Leo Schürmann	(Czechoslovakia) 1938 Prague	Men's pommel horse
Silver	Michael Reusch	(Czechoslovakia) 1938 Prague	Men's rings
Gold	Eugen Mack	(Czechoslovakia) 1938 Prague	Men's vault
Silver	Walter Beck	(Czechoslovakia) 1938 Prague	Men's vault
Bronze	Hans Negelin	(Czechoslovakia) 1938 Prague	Men's vault
Gold	Michael Reusch	(Czechoslovakia) 1938 Prague	Men's parallel bars
Gold	Michael Reusch	(Czechoslovakia) 1938 Prague	Men's horizontal bar
Bronze	Walter Beck	(Czechoslovakia) 1938 Prague	Men's horizontal bar
Gold	Marcel Adatte, Hans Eugster, Ernst Gebendinger, Jack Günthard, Walter Lehmann, Josef Stalder, Melchior Thalmann, Jean Tschabold	(Switzerland) 1950 Basel	Men's team
Gold	Walter Lehmann	(Switzerland) 1950 Basel	Men's all-around
Silver	Marcel Adatte	(Switzerland) 1950 Basel	Men's all-around
Gold	Josef Stalder	(Switzerland) 1950 Basel	Men's floor exercise
Gold	Ernst Gebendinger	(Switzerland) 1950 Basel	Men's floor exercise
Gold	Josef Stalder	(Switzerland) 1950 Basel	Men's pommel horse
Silver	Marcel Adatte	(Switzerland) 1950 Basel	Men's pommel horse
Bronze	Walter Lehmann	(Switzerland) 1950 Basel	Men's pommel horse
Gold	Walter Lehmann	(Switzerland) 1950 Basel	Men's rings
Bronze	Hans Eugster	(Switzerland) 1950 Basel	Men's rings
Gold	Ernst Gebendinger	(Switzerland) 1950 Basel	Men's vault
Bronze	Walter Lehmann	(Switzerland) 1950 Basel	Men's vault
Gold	Hans Eugster	(Switzerland) 1950 Basel	Men's parallel bars
Bronze	Walter Lehmann	(Switzerland) 1950 Basel	Men's horizontal bar
Bronze	Josef Stalder	(Switzerland) 1950 Basel	Men's horizontal bar
Bronze	Hans Bründler, Oswald Bühler, Hans Eugster, Jack Günthard, Hans Schwartzentruber, Josef Stalder, Melchior Thalmann, Jean Tschabold	(Italy) 1954 Rome	Men's team
Silver	Josef Stalder	(Italy) 1954 Rome	Men's pommel horse
Silver	Josef Stalder	(Italy) 1954 Rome	Men's parallel bars
Bronze	Hans Eugster	(Italy) 1954 Rome	Men's parallel bars
Bronze	Li Donghua	(Australia) 1994 Brisbane	Men's pommel horse
Gold	Li Donghua	(Japan) 1995 Sabae	Men's pommel horse
Silver	Li Donghua	(Puerto Rico) 1996 San Juan	Men's pommel horse
Bronze	Dieter Rehm	(China) 1999 Tianjin	Men's vault
Silver	Ariella Käslin	(United Kingdom) 2009 London	Women's vault
Bronze	Giulia Steingruber	(Canada) 2017 Montreal	Women's vault
Bronze	Noe Seifert	(Indonesia) 2025 Jakarta	Men's all-around

== Medal tables ==
=== By gender ===
Gender	Gold	Silver	Bronze	Total
Men	19	15	15	49
Women	0	1	1	2

=== By event ===
Event	Gold	Silver	Bronze	Total
Men's pommel horse	4	4	3	11
Men's vault	3	2	3	8
Men's parallel bars	3	2	2	7
Men's floor exercise	3	2	0	5
Men's individual all-around	2	1	2	5
Men's team	2	1	1	4
Men's rings	1	2	1	4
Men's horizontal bar	1	1	3	5
Women's vault	0	1	1	2

== See also ==
- Switzerland men's national artistic gymnastics team
- Switzerland women's national artistic gymnastics team
- List of Olympic female artistic gymnasts for Switzerland
