= Switzerland men's national artistic gymnastics team =

Switzerland men's national gymnastics team
- Continental union: European Gymnastics Union

Olympic Games
- Appearances: Gold: 1928; Silver: 1936, 1948, 1952; Bronze: 1924

World Championships
- Appearances: Gold: 1934, 1950; Silver: 1938; Bronze: 1954

Junior World Championships

European Championships
- Medals: Silver: 2025; Bronze: 2016, 2026

The Switzerland men's national artistic gymnastics team represents Switzerland in World Gymnastics international competitions.

== History ==
The first Swiss gymnastics society was founded in 1832, and they became the first country to establish a national gymnastics federation. At the very first Olympic Games, Swiss gymnast Louis Zutter won gold on pommel horse. The Swiss men's gymnastics team won the gold medal in the team event at the 1928 Summer Olympics.

Despite forming the first national gymnastics federation, Switzerland did not compete at a World Championships until 1934, where they won gold as a team.

Switzerland has boycotted two Olympic Games. The first in 1956, which they boycotted due to the Soviet Union invading Hungary to stop the Hungarian Revolution against the Communist regime, and the second in 1980, in which Switzerland competed under the Olympic Flag but did not send a gymnastics team.

== Team competition results ==
=== Olympic Games ===
Year	Position	Squad
1924	Bronze	Hans Grieder, August Güttinger, Jean Gutweninger, Georges Miez, Otto Pfister, Antoine Rebetez, Carl Widmer, Josef Wilhelm
1928	Gold	Hans Grieder, August Güttinger, Hermann Hänggi, Eugen Mack, Georges Miez, Otto Pfister, Eduard Steinemann, Melchior Wezel
1936	Gold	Walter Bach, Albert Bachmann, Walter Beck, Eugen Mack, Georges Miez, Michael Reusch, Eduard Steinemann, Josef Walter
1948	Silver	Karl Frei, Christian Kipfer, Walter Lehmann, Robert Lucy, Michael Reusch, Josef Stalder, Emil Studer, Melchior Thalmann
1952	Silver	Hans Eugster, Ernst Fivian, Ernst Gebendinger, Jack Günthard, Hans Schwarzentruber, Josef Stalder, Melchior Thalmann, Jean Tschabold
1956	boycotted	—N/a
1960	8th place	Max Benker, André Brüllmann, Fritz Feuz, Ernst Fivian, Hans Schwarzentruber, Edy Thomi
1964	14th place	Meinrad Berchtold, Fredi Egger, Franz Fäh, Gottlieb Fässler, Fritz Feuz, Walter Müller
1968	9th place	Meinrad Berchtold, Hans Ettlin, Edwin Greutmann, Roland Hürzeler, Paul Müller, Peter Rohner
1972	11th place	Robert Bretscher, Max Brühwiler, Hans Ettlin, Philippe Gaille, Edwin Greutmann, Peter Rohner
1976	8th place	Ueli Bachmann, Robert Bretscher, Philippe Gaille, Bernhard Locher, Peter Rohner, Armin Vock
1980	boycotted	—N/a
1984	5th place	Bruno Cavelti, Markus Lehmann, Urs Meister, Marco Piatti, Daniel Wunderlin, Josef Zellweger
1988	—N/a	did not qualify a full team
1992	11th place	Michael Engeler, Daniel Giubellini, Oliver Grimm, Markus Müller, Flavio Rota, Erich Wanner
1996–2012	—N/a	did not qualify a full team
2016	9th place	Christian Baumann, Pablo Brägger, Benjamin Gischard, Oliver Hegi, Eddy Yusof
2020	6th place	Christian Baumann, Pablo Brägger, Benjamin Gischard, Eddy Yusof
2024	7th place	Luca Giubellini, Matteo Giubellini, Florian Langenegger, Noe Seifert, Taha Serhani

=== World Championships ===
Year	Position	Squad
1934	Gold	Walter Bach, Hans Grieder, Hermann Hänggi, Eugen Mack, Georges Miez, Eduard Steinemann, Josef Walter, Melchior Wezel
1938	Silver	Albert Bachmann, Walter Beck, Eugen Mack, Hans Negelin, Michael Reusch, Leo Schürmann, Smid
1950	Gold	Marcel Adatte, Hans Eugster, Ernst Gebendinger, Jack Günthard, Walter Lehmann, Josef Stalder, Melchior Thalmann, Jean Tschabold
1954	Bronze	Hans Bründler, Oswald Bühler, Hans Eugster, Jack Günthard, Hans Schwartzentruber, Josef Stalder, Melchior Thalmann, Jean Tschabold
1962	9th place	
1970	6th place	Max Brühwiler, Hans Ettlin, Edwin Gerutmann, Roland Hürzeler, Paul Müller, Peter Rohner
1974	7th place	Michele Arnaboldi, Robert Bretscher, Renati Giess, Peter Rohner, Reinhold Schnyder, Armin Vock
2006	8th place	Claudio Capelli, Nicolas Boeschenstein, Mark Ramseier, Roger Sager, Andreas Schweizer, Daniel Groves
2014	7th place	Christian Baumann, Pascal Bucher, Benjamin Gischard, Oliver Hegi, Kevin Rossi, Eddy Yusof
2015	6th place	Christian Baumann, Pablo Brägger, Pascal Bucher, Claudio Capelli, Oliver Hegi, Eddy Yusof
2018	6th place	Christian Baumann, Pablo Brägger, Benjamin Gischard, Oliver Hegi, Eddy Yusof
2019	7th place	Christian Baumann, Pablo Brägger, Benjamin Gischard, Oliver Hegi, Eddy Yusof
2022	20th place	Andrin Frey, Moreno Kratter, Florian Langenegger, Noe Seifert, Taha Serhani
2023	5th place	Christian Baumann, Luca Giubellini, Florian Langenegger, Noe Seifert, Taha Serhani
2026	5th place	Matteo Giubellini, Florian Langenegger, Mattie Piffaretti, Noe Seifert, Dominic Tamsel, Luca Giubellini

== Most decorated gymnasts ==
This list includes all Swiss male artistic gymnasts who have won at least 3 medals at the Olympic Games or the World Artistic Gymnastics Championships combined.

Rank	Gymnast	Years	Team	AA	FX	PH	SR	VT	PB	HB	Olympic Total	World Total	Total
1	Eugen Mack	1928–1938	1928; 1934; 1936; 1938	1934; 1936; 1938	1934; 1938; 1936	1934; 1936	1934	1928; 1934; 1938; 1936	1934	1928	8	11	19
2	Josef Stalder	1948–1954	1950; 1948; 1952; 1954	1952	1950	1950; 1954			1954; 1948; 1952	1948; 1952; 1950	7	7	14
3	Georges Miez	1924–1936	1928; 1934; 1936; 1924	1928	1934; 1936; 1932	1928				1928; 1934	8	3	11
4	Michael Reusch	1936–1948	1936; 1938; 1948			1938	1938; 1948		1938; 1948; 1936	1938	5	5	10
5	Walter Lehmann	1948–1950	1950; 1948	1950; 1948		1950	1950	1950		1948; 1950	3	6	9
6	Hans Eugster	1950–1954	1950; 1952; 1954				1950; 1952		1950; 1952; 1954		3	5	8
7	Hermann Hänggi	1928–1934	1928; 1934	1928		1928			1928		4	1	5
8	Eduard Steinemann	1928–1936	1928; 1934; 1936			1934		1934			2	3	5
9	Ernst Gebendinger	1950–1950	1950; 1952		1950			1950			1	3	4
10	Jack Günthard	1950–1954	1950; 1952; 1954							1952	2	2	4
10	Li Donghua	1994–1996				1995; 1996; 1996; 1994					1	3	4
12	August Güttinger	1924–1928	1928; 1924						1924		4 (Note: Güttinger additionally won a bronze medal in rope climbing at the 1924 Olympic Games, a now discontinued Olympic event)	0	4
13	Josef Walter	1934–1936	1934; 1936		1936				1934		2	2	4
14	Melchior Thalmann	1948–1954	1950; 1948; 1952; 1954								2	2	4
15	Walter Beck	1936–1938	1936; 1938					1938		1938	1	3	4
16	Hans Grieder	1924–1934	1928; 1934; 1924								2	1	3
17	Louis Zutter	1896				1896		1896	1896		3	0	3
18	Walter Bach	1934–1936	1934; 1936						1934		1	2	3
18	Jean Tschabold	1950–1954	1950; 1952; 1954								1	2	3
20	Albert Bachmann	1936–1938	1936; 1938			1936					2	1	3
20	Jean Gutweniger	1924	1924			1924				1924	3	0	3

== See also ==
- Switzerland women's national artistic gymnastics team
