= 1950 Artistic Gymnastics World Championships =

Gymnastics competition

1950 World Artistic Gymnastics Championships
- Location: Basel, Switzerland

The 12th Artistic Gymnastics World Championships were held in Basel, the second largest city of Switzerland, on July 14-16, 1950. 20,000 spectators watched the championships, held for the first time in Switzerland, and the Swiss team was very successful in front of the home crowd.

== Medallists ==
Event	Gold	Silver	Bronze
Men
Team all-around	Switzerland; Marcel Adatte; Hans Eugster; Ernst Gebendinger; Jack Günthard; Walter Lehmann; Josef Stalder; Melchior Thalmann; Jean Tschabold	Finland; Paavo Aaltonen; Veikko Huhtanen; Kalevi Laitinen; Kaino Lempinen; Olavi Rove; Heikki Savolainen; Esa Seeste; Kalevi Viskari	France; Alphonse Anger; Raymond Badin; Marcel de Wolf; Raymond Dot; Lucien Masset; Michel Mathiot; Gilbert Pruvost; André Weingand
Individual all-around	(Switzerland) Walter Lehmann	(Switzerland) Marcel Adatte	(Finland) Olavi Rove
Floor	(Switzerland) Josef Stalder (Switzerland) Ernst Gebendinger	none awarded	(France) Raymond Dot
Pommel horse	(Switzerland) Josef Stalder	(Switzerland) Marcel Adatte	(Switzerland) Walter Lehmann
Rings	(Switzerland) Walter Lehmann	(Finland) Olavi Rove	(Switzerland) Hans Eugster
Vault	(Switzerland) Ernst Gebendinger	(Finland) Olavi Rove	(Switzerland) Walter Lehmann
Parallel bars	(Switzerland) Hans Eugster	(Finland) Olavi Rove	(France) Raymond Dot
Horizontal bar	(Finland) Paavo Aaltonen	(Finland) Veikko Huhtanen	(Switzerland) Walter Lehmann (Switzerland) Josef Stalder
Women
Team all-around	Sweden; Evy Berggren; Vanja Blomberg; Karin Lindberg; Gunnel Ljungström; Hjördis Nordin; Ann-Sofi Pettersson; Göta Pettersson; Ingrid Sandahl	France; Ginette Durand; Colette Hué; Madeleine Jouffroy; Alexandra Lemoine; Liliane Montagne; Christine Palau; Irène Pittelioen; Jeanette Vogelbacher	Italy; Renata Bianchi; Licia Macchini; Laura Micheli; Anna Monlarini; Marja Nutti; Elena Santoni; Liliana Scaricabarozzi; Lilia Torriani
Individual all-around	(Poland) Helena Rakoczy	(Sweden) Ann-Sofi Pettersson	(Austria) Gertrude Kolar
Vault	(Poland) Helena Rakoczy	(Austria) Gertrude Kolar	(France) Alexandra Lemoine
Uneven bars or flying rings	(Sweden) Ann-Sofi Pettersson (Austria) Gertrude Kolar	none awarded	(Poland) Helena Rakoczy
Balance beam	(Poland) Helena Rakoczy	(Italy) Marja Nutti	(Italy) Licia Macchini
Floor	(Poland) Helena Rakoczy	(Socialist Federal Republic of Yugoslavia) Tereza Kočiš	(Poland) Stefania Reindlowa
Team, portable apparatus	Sweden	Yugoslavia	France

== Men's results ==
=== Team competition ===
Rank	Team	Total
1st place, gold medalist(s)	Switzerland	852.250
2nd place, silver medalist(s)	Finland	838.500
3rd place, bronze medalist(s)	France	807.850
4	Italy	728.900
5	Yugoslavia	664.900
6	Egypt	623.800

=== Individual all-around ===
Rank	Gymnast	Total
1st place, gold medalist(s)	Walter Lehmann (SUI)	143.300
2nd place, silver medalist(s)	Marcel Adatte (SUI)	141.000
3rd place, bronze medalist(s)	Olavi Rove (FIN)	140.800
4	Guido Figone (ITA)	139.950
5	Josef Stoffel (LUX)	139.500
6	Josef Stalder (SUI)	139.400
7	Kalevi Viskari (FIN)	139.350
8	Raymond Dot (FRA)	138.850
9	Ernst Gebendinger (SUI)	138.800
10	Jack Günthard (SUI)	138.750
11	Melchior Thalmann (SUI)	138.200
12	Kalevi Laitinen (FIN)	138.050

=== Floor exercise ===
Rank	Gymnast	Compulsory	Optional	Total
1st place, gold medalist(s)	Josef Stalder (SUI)	9.600	9.650	19.250
1st place, gold medalist(s)	Ernst Gebendinger (SUI)	9.500	9.750	19.250
3rd place, bronze medalist(s)	Raymond Dot (FRA)	9.600	9.600	19.200
4	Kaino Lempinen (FIN)	9.600	9.550	19.150
4	Olavi Rove (FIN)	9.600	9.550	19.150
4	Ernst Wister (AUT)	9.600	9.550	19.150
7	Guido Figone (ITA)	9.600	9.450	19.050
8	Kalevi Viskari (FIN)	9.450	9.550	19.000

=== Pommel horse ===
Rank	Gymnast	Compulsory	Optional	Total
1st place, gold medalist(s)	Josef Stalder (SUI)	9.800	9.900	19.700
2nd place, silver medalist(s)	Marcel Adatte (SUI)	9.600	9.750	19.350
3rd place, bronze medalist(s)	Walter Lehmann (SUI)	9.400	9.650	19.050
4	Veikko Huhtanen (FIN)	9.500	9.400	18.900
4	Melchior Thalmann (SUI)	9.400	9.500	18.900
6	Guido Figone (ITA)	9.300	9.550	18.850
7	Luigi Zanetti (ITA)	9.500	9.100	18.600

=== Rings ===
Rank	Gymnast	Compulsory	Optional	Total
1st place, gold medalist(s)	Walter Lehmann (SUI)	9.750	9.850	19.600
2nd place, silver medalist(s)	Olavi Rove (FIN)	9.650	9.650	19.300
3rd place, bronze medalist(s)	Hans Eugster (SUI)	9.550	9.650	19.200
4	Ali Zaki (EGY)	9.450	9.700	19.150
5	Guido Figone (ITA)	9.500	9.400	18.900
6	Raymond Dot (FRA)	9.500	9.350	18.850
6	Heikki Savolainen (FIN)	9.350	9.500	18.850

=== Vault ===
Rank	Gymnast	Compulsory	Optional	Total
1st place, gold medalist(s)	Ernst Gebendinger (SUI)	9.750	9.700	19.450
2nd place, silver medalist(s)	Olavi Rove (FIN)	9.600	9.750	19.350
3rd place, bronze medalist(s)	Walter Lehmann (SUI)	9.650	9.650	19.300
4	Josef Stalder (SUI)	9.750	9.450	19.200
4	Melchior Thalmann (SUI)	9.600	9.600	19.200
4	Jean Tschabold (SUI)	9.700	9.500	19.200
7	Kalevi Viskari (FIN)	9.500	9.600	19.100
8	Paavo Aaltonen (FIN)	9.450	9.550	19.000

=== Parallel bars ===
Rank	Gymnast	Compulsory	Optional	Total
1st place, gold medalist(s)	Hans Eugster (SUI)	10.000	9.850	19.850
2nd place, silver medalist(s)	Olavi Rove (FIN)	9.850	9.600	19.450
3rd place, bronze medalist(s)	Raymond Dot (FRA)	9.800	9.550	19.350
4	Walter Lehmann (SUI)	9.700	9.600	19.300
5	Heikki Savolainen (FIN)	9.600	9.650	19.250
6	Alphonse Anger (FRA)	9.550	9.350	18.900
6	Guido Figone (ITA)	9.200	9.700	18.900

=== Horizontal bar ===
Rank	Gymnast	Compulsory	Optional	Total
1st place, gold medalist(s)	Paavo Aaltonen (FIN)	9.750	9.700	19.450
2nd place, silver medalist(s)	Veikko Huhtanen (FIN)	9.800	9.600	19.400
3rd place, bronze medalist(s)	Walter Lehmann (SUI)	9.750	9.600	19.350
3rd place, bronze medalist(s)	Josef Stalder (SUI)	9.750	9.600	19.350
5	Olavi Rove (FIN)	9.650	9.600	19.250
6	Raymond Dot (FRA)	9.650	9.500	19.150

== Women's Results ==
=== Team competition ===
Rank	Team	Total
1st place, gold medalist(s)	Sweden	607.500
2nd place, silver medalist(s)	France	598.766
3rd place, bronze medalist(s)	Italy	594.250
4	Yugoslavia	589.333
5	Poland	587.333
6	Austria	585.783
7	Belgium	509.866

=== Individual all-around ===
Rank	Gymnast	Total
1st place, gold medalist(s)	Helena Rakoczy (POL)	94.016
2nd place, silver medalist(s)	Ann-Sofi Pettersson (SWE)	91.700
3rd place, bronze medalist(s)	Gertrude Kolar (AUT)	91.000
4	Evy Berggren (SWE)	90.633
5	Alexandra Lemoine (FRA)	90.516
6	Ginette Durand (FRA)	90.466
7	Laura Micheli (ITA)	90.100
8	Ingrid Sandahl (SWE)	89.933
9	Jeanette Vogelbacher (FRA)	89.483
10	Marja Nutti (ITA)	89.333
11	Zofia Krupianka (POL)	89.300
12	Edeltraud Schramm (AUT)	88.883

=== Vault ===
Rank	Gymnast	Total
1st place, gold medalist(s)	Helena Rakoczy (POL)	23.566
2nd place, silver medalist(s)	Gertrude Kolar (AUT)	23.466
3rd place, bronze medalist(s)	Alexandra Lemoine (FRA)	23.400
4	Karin Lindberg (SWE)	23.366
5	Stefania Reindlowa (POL)	23.300

=== Uneven bars or flying rings ===
Rank	Gymnast	Total
1st place, gold medalist(s)	Gertrude Kolar (AUT)	24.000
1st place, gold medalist(s)	Ann-Sofi Pettersson (SWE)	24.000
3rd place, bronze medalist(s)	Helena Rakoczy (POL)	23.850
4	Ingrid Sandahl (SWE)	23.600
5	Edeltraud Schramm (AUT)	23.550
6	Traudl Ruckser (AUT)	23.500
6	Vida Gerbec (YUG)	23.500

=== Balance beam ===
Rank	Gymnast	Total
1st place, gold medalist(s)	Helena Rakoczy (POL)	23.433
2nd place, silver medalist(s)	Marja Nutti (ITA)	23.333
3rd place, bronze medalist(s)	Licia Macchini (ITA)	23.200
4	Stefania Reindlowa (POL)	22.966
5	Madeleine Jouffroy (FRA)	22.933

=== Floor exercise ===
Rank	Gymnast	Total
1st place, gold medalist(s)	Helena Rakoczy (POL)	23.166
2nd place, silver medalist(s)	Tereza Kočiš (YUG)	23.033
3rd place, bronze medalist(s)	Stefania Reindlowa (POL)	23.000
4	Madeleine Jouffroy (FRA)	22.966
5	Laura Micheli (ITA)	22.600

== Medals ==
Rank	Nation	Gold	Silver	Bronze	Total
1	Switzerland (SUI)	8	2	5	15
2	Poland (POL)	4	0	2	6
3	Sweden (SWE)	2	1	0	3
4	Finland (FIN)	1	5	1	7
5	Austria (AUT)	1	1	1	3
6	France (FRA)	0	1	4	5
7	Italy (ITA)	0	1	2	3
8	Yugoslavia (YUG)	0	1	0	1
Totals (8 entries)		16	12	15	43
