= Macchini =

Macchini is an Italian surname. Notable people with the surname include:

- Carlo Macchini, (born 1996), Italian artistic gymnast
- Licia Macchini, (1930–2018), Italian artistic gymnast
