= Stefania Reindl =

Polish gymnast (1922–1993)

- Born: 24 February 1922
- Died: 11 March 1993 (aged 71)

Gymnastics career
- Discipline: Women's artistic gymnastics
- Country represented: Poland
Medal record
Representing Poland
Women's Gymnastics
World Championships
Bronze medal – third place	1950 Basel	Floor

Stefania Reindl (24 February 1922 – 11 March 1993) was a Polish artistic gymnast. She competed at the 1952 Summer Olympics.
