= Hana Bobková =

Czech gymnast

Personal information
- Full name: Hana Bobková-Vláčilová
- Born: 19 February 1929 Prague, Czechoslovakia
- Died: 1 July 2017 (aged 88) Prague, Czech Republic
Medal record
Women's gymnastics
Representing Czechoslovakia
Olympic Games
Bronze medal – third place	1952 Helsinki	Team

Hana Bobková (19 February 1929 – 1 July 2017), also known as Hana Vláčilová, was a Czech gymnast who competed in the 1952 Summer Olympics.

Bobková died on 1 July 2017, at the age of 88.
