= Ingrid Sandahl =

Swedish gymnast (1924–2011)

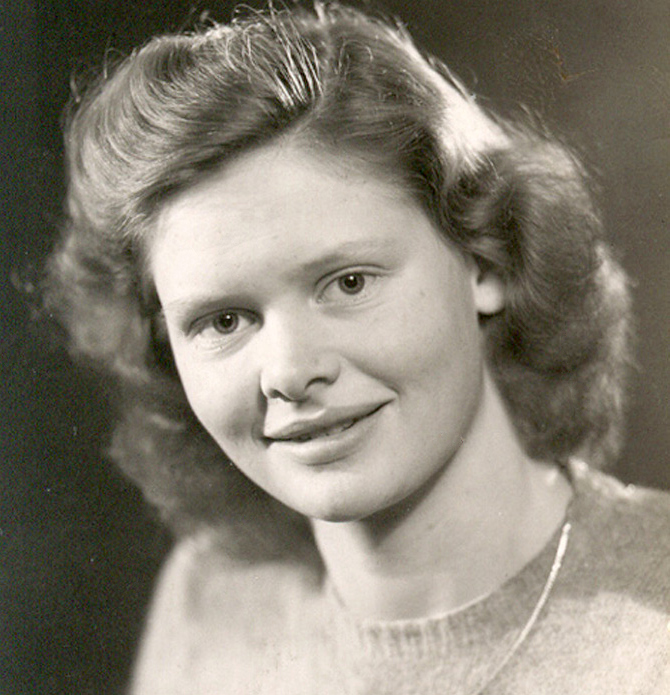

Personal information
- Born: 5 November 1924 Stockholm, Sweden
- Died: 15 November 2011 (aged 87) Örebro, Sweden

Gymnastics career
- Discipline: Women's artistic gymnastics
- Club: GK Hermes, Stockholm
Medal record
Representing Sweden
Olympic Games
Gold medal – first place	1952 Helsinki	Team portable apparatus
World Championships
Gold medal – first place	1950 Basel	Team all-around

Ingrid Sandahl (5 November 1924 – 15 November 2011) was a Swedish artistic gymnast. She competed at both the 1948 and 1952 Olympics and won a gold medal in the team portable apparatus event in 1952. She also won a gold all-around team medal and team portable apparatus medal at the 1950 World Artistic Gymnastics Championships. Individually, she won three all-around medals at the Swedish Championships, including gold in 1949.

== Biography ==
Sandahl was born in Stockholm in 1924 and began gymnastics around 1937, when she was 13. In 1947, she won silver at the Swedish Championships, and in 1948, bronze. At the two selection events for the 1948 Summer Olympics, she placed second at one and first at the other, and she won a place on the team. It was the first time that Sweden had sent a gymnastics team to the Olympics since 1920, due to differences that had developed between the Swedish style of gymnastics and the international one.

At the Olympics, the Swedish team placed fourth. Sandahl continued to compete afterward, and in 1949, she won her only Swedish title.

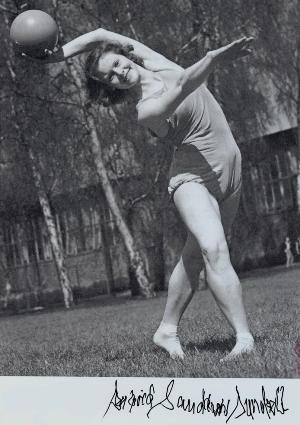
Sandahl performing with a ball

She was one of three gymnasts from the Olympic team (along with Karin Lindberg and Göta Pettersson) who also competed at the 1950 World Championships. They won the gold team medal as well as gold in the team portable apparatus event, where they performed with balls. Sandahl was eighth in the individual all-around and placed fourth on the uneven bars.

Her last competition was the 1952 Summer Olympics, where the Swedish team again placed fourth but won gold in the team portable apparatus event.

Sandahl married later in 1952. She had four daughters and became a licensed physiotherapist. She died in Örebro on 15 November 2011.
