= Jana Rabasová =

Czech gymnast

Olympic medal record

Women's gymnastics

Representing Czechoslovakia
| Bronze medal – third place | 1952 Helsinki | Team |

Jana Rabasová (22 July 1933 – 3 January 2008) was a Czech gymnast who competed in the 1952 Summer Olympics. She died on 3 January 2008, at the age of 74.
