= Hjördis Nordin =

Swedish gymnast

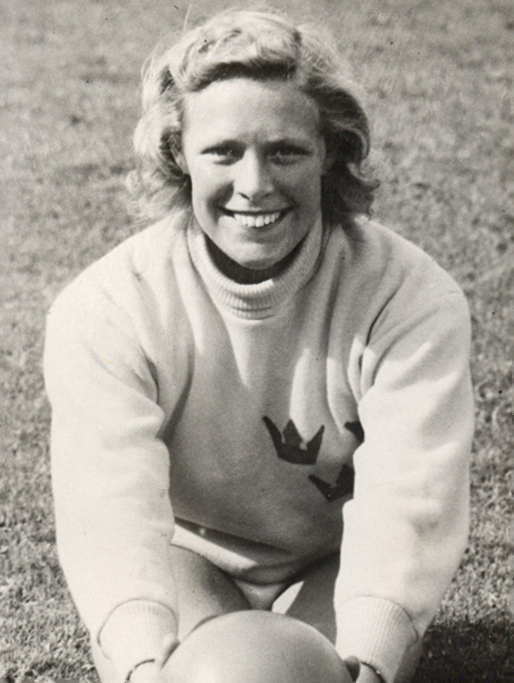

Personal information
- Born: 2 August 1932 (age 94) Lund, Sweden

Gymnastics career
- Discipline: Women's artistic gymnastics
- Club: GF Idrott, Landskrona
Medal record
Representing Sweden
Olympic Games
Gold medal – first place	1952 Helsinki	Team portable apparatus
World Championships
Gold medal – first place	1950 Basel	Team all-around

Hjördis Margareta Nordin (later Hallquist, born 2 August 1932) is a retired Swedish gymnast. She was part of the Swedish teams that won gold medals at the 1950 World Artistic Gymnastics Championships (all-around) and 1952 Summer Olympics (team portable apparatus).
