= Marja Nutti =

Italian artistic gymnast

Gymnastics career
- Discipline: Women's artistic gymnastics
- Country represented: Italy
Medal record
Representing Switzerland
World Championships
Silver medal – second place	1950 Basel	Balance beam
Bronze medal – third place	1950 Basel	Team

Marja Nutti is an Italian former artistic gymnast. She won the balance beam silver medal at the 1950 World Championships, as well as helped her team to the bronze medal.
