= Mathias Erang =

Luxembourgish gymnast (1902–1978)

- Born: 1 May 1902 Malstatt-Burbach, German Empire
- Died: 20 December 1978 (aged 76) Esch-sur-Alzette, Luxembourg
- Relatives: Hubert Erang (son)

Gymnastics career
- Discipline: Men's artistic gymnastics
- Country represented: Luxembourg

Mathias Erang (1 May 1902 – 20 December 1978) was a Luxembourgish gymnast. He competed at the 1924 Summer Olympics, the 1928 Summer Olympics and the 1936 Summer Olympics.
