= Göta Pettersson =

Swedish gymnast

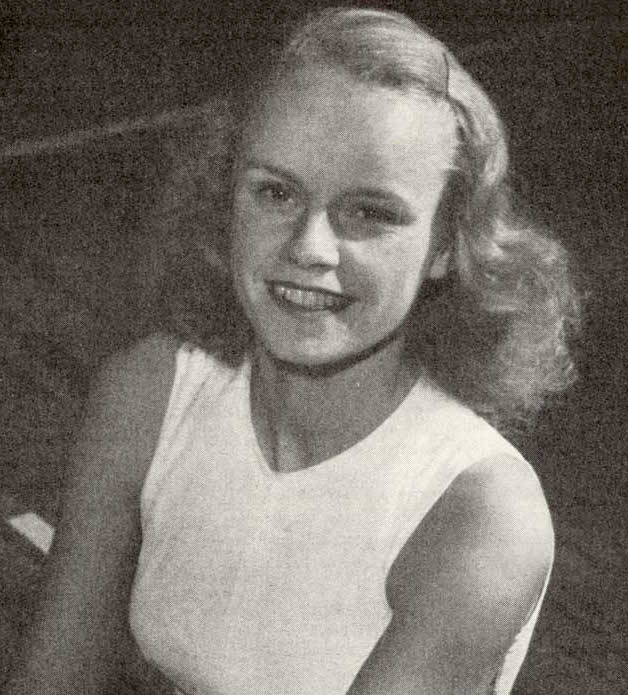

Personal information
- Born: 18 December 1926 Stockholm, Sweden
- Died: 9 October 1993 (aged 66) Stockholm, Sweden

Gymnastics career
- Discipline: Women's artistic gymnastics
- Club: GK Stockholmsflickorna; Östermalms GF, Stockholm
Medal record
Representing Sweden
Olympic Games
Gold medal – first place	1952 Helsinki	Team portable apparatus
World Championships
Gold medal – first place	1950 Basel	Team all-around

Göta Elisabeth Pettersson (18 December 1926 – 9 October 1993) was a Swedish artistic gymnast. She competed at both the 1948 and 1952 Summer Olympics and won a gold medal in the team portable apparatus event in 1952. She also won the gold team medal and team portable apparatus medal at the 1950 World Artistic Gymnastics Championships, and individually, she was the 1948 Swedish champion.

== Biography ==
Pettersson was born in 1926 in Stockholm to a single mother, as her father died before she was born. She swam as a child and began gymnastics in 1941. In 1946, she became the bronze medalist at the Swedish Championships.

In 1948, she won the Swedish championships and was sent to compete at the 1948 Summer Olympics. Because Sweden had developed its own gymnastics style that differed from that used in international competition, they had not sent a team to the Olympics since 1920. The team placed fourth.

Pettersson was one of three members of the Olympic team (along with Karin Lindberg and Ingrid Sandahl) that then competed at the 1950 World Championships. The Swedish team won gold in the all-around team event as well as in the team portable apparatus event, where they used balls as their apparatus.

Her last competition was the 1952 Summer Olympics. The Swedish team again placed fourth in the team all-around, but they won gold in the team portable apparatus event ahead of the Soviet Union and Hungary.

She married in 1953 and was not involved in competitive sports thereafter. She had two children, worked as a seamstress, and died in 1993.
