= Gertrude Kolar =

Austrian gymnast (1926–2014)

- Born: 23 January 1926
- Died: 22 December 2014 (aged 88)

Gymnastics career
- Discipline: Women's artistic gymnastics
- Country represented: Austria
Medal record
Women's gymnastics
Representing Switzerland
World Championships
Gold medal – first place	1950 Basel	Uneven Bars
Silver medal – second place	1950 Basel	Vault
Bronze medal – third place	1950 Basel	All-Around

Gertrude Gollner-Kolar (23 January 1926 – 22 December 2014) was an Austrian artistic gymnast. She competed at the 1948 and 1952 Summer Olympics. At the 1950 Artistic Gymnastics World Championships, she won an uneven bars gold medal along with Ann-Sofi Pettersson of Sweden; Kolar also won the silver medal on vault and the bronze medal in the individual all-around.

Kolar died on 22 December 2014, at the age of 88.
