= Věra Vančurová =

Czech gymnast

Olympic medal record

Women's gymnastics

Representing Czechoslovakia
Bronze medal – third place	1952 Helsinki	Team

Věra Vančurová (17 September 1932 – 6 February 2018) was a Czech gymnast who competed in the 1952 Summer Olympics, receiving a bronze medal in the team event.

Vančurová was born in Prague in September 1932. She died there on 6 February 2018, at the age of 85.
