= Esa Seeste =

Finnish artistic gymnast

- Born: 4 July 1913 Viipuri, Grand Duchy of Finland, Russian Empire
- Died: 2 October 1997 (aged 84) Helsinki, Finland

Gymnastics career
- Discipline: Men's artistic gymnastics
- Country represented: Finland
Medal record
Men's artistic gymnastics
Representing Finland
Olympic Games
Bronze medal – third place	1936 Berlin	Team
World Championships
Silver medal – second place	1950 Basel	Team

Esa Seeste (4 July 1913 – 2 October 1997) was a Finnish gymnast who competed in the 1936 Summer Olympics.
