= Vanja Blomberg =

Swedish gymnast

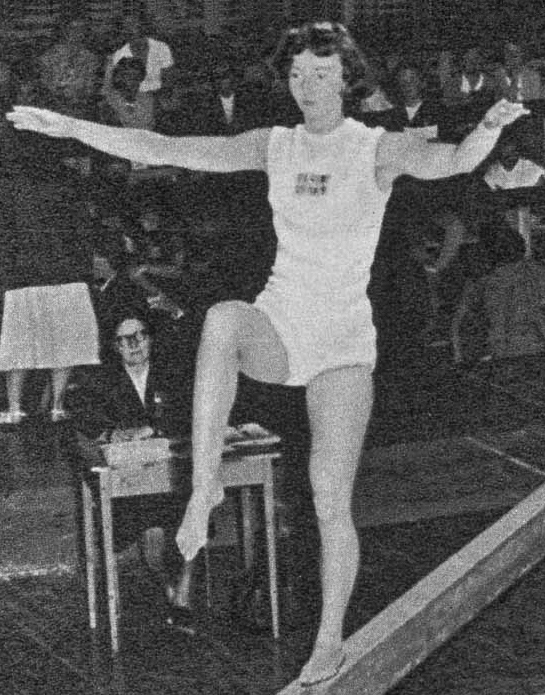
- Blomberg at the 1952 Olympics

Personal information
- Born: 28 January 1929 (age 97) Gothenburg, Sweden

Gymnastics career
- Discipline: Women's artistic gymnastics
- Club: Huskvarna GF, Jönköping
Medal record
Representing Sweden
Olympic Games
Gold medal – first place	1952 Helsinki	Team portable apparatus
World Championships
Gold medal – first place	1950 Basel	Team all-around

Vanja Hedvig Desideria Blomberg (later Webjörn, born 28 January 1929) is a retired Swedish gymnast. She was part of the Swedish teams that won gold medals at the 1950 World Artistic Gymnastics Championships (all-around) and 1952 Summer Olympics (team portable apparatus). She was the national all-around champion in 1950 and attended the 1956 Olympics as a coach.
