= Erich Wanner =

Swiss gymnast

- Born: 5 April 1969 (age 57)
- Height: 1.59 m (5 ft 3 in)

Gymnastics career
- Discipline: Men's artistic gymnastics
- Country represented: Switzerland
- Gym: Turnverein Beggingen

Erich Wanner (born 5 April 1969) is a Swiss gymnast. He competed at the 1992 Summer Olympics and the 1996 Summer Olympics.
