= Paul Müller (gymnast) =

Swiss gymnast

- Born: 21 January 1946 (age 80) Udligenswil, Switzerland
- Height: 1.66 m (5 ft 5 in)

Gymnastics career
- Discipline: Men's artistic gymnastics
- Country represented: Switzerland

Paul Müller (born 21 January 1946) is a Swiss former gymnast. He competed in eight events at the 1968 Summer Olympics.
