= Meinrad Berchtold =

Swiss gymnast (1943–2019)

- Born: 2 December 1943 Baden, Switzerland
- Died: 15 August 2019 (aged 75)
- Height: 1.63 m (5 ft 4 in)

Gymnastics career
- Discipline: Men's artistic gymnastics
- Country represented: Switzerland

Meinrad Berchtold (2 December 1943 – 15 August 2019) was a Swiss gymnast. He competed at the 1964 Summer Olympics and the 1968 Summer Olympics, representing Switzerland.
