= Fritz Feuz =

Swiss gymnast (1931–2022)

- Born: 28 April 1931 Wilderswil, Switzerland
- Died: 14 December 2022 (aged 91)
- Height: 1.70 m (5 ft 7 in)

Gymnastics career
- Discipline: Men's artistic gymnastics
- Country represented: Switzerland

Fritz Feuz (28 April 1931 – 14 December 2022) was a Swiss gymnast. He competed at the 1960 Summer Olympics and the 1964 Summer Olympics.
