= Licia Macchini =

Italian artistic gymnast

- Born: 11 July 1930 Lodi, Italy
- Died: 29 November 2018 (aged 88)

Gymnastics career
- Discipline: Women's artistic gymnastics
- Country represented: Italy
Medal record
Representing Italy
World Championships
Bronze medal – third place	1950 Basel	Team
Bronze medal – third place	1950 Basel	Balance beam

Licia Macchini (11 July 1930 – 29 November 2018) was an artistic gymnast. She competed at the 1948 and 1952 Summer Olympics. She was an Italian gymnast born in Lodi. She was a member of the Fanfulla club under coach Riccardo Fraschini. She was Italian champion in the all-around in 1950, but her greatest sporting success came at the 1950 World Championships in Basel, when she won two bronze medals. She won the first bronze medal individually in the balance beam and the second with the Italian team.
