= Tetsumi Nabeya =

Japanese gymnast (1930–2010)

- 鍋谷 鐵巳
- Born: 2 January 1930
- Died: 4 April 2010 (aged 80)

Gymnastics career
- Discipline: Men's artistic gymnastics
- Country represented: Japan

Tetsumi Nabeya (鍋谷鐵巳, Nabeya Tetsuya; 2 January 1930 – 4 April 2010) was a Japanese gymnast. He competed in eight events at the 1952 Summer Olympics.

His best result was 14th place in Floor Exercise and his worst result was 69th place in Rings. He achieved fifth place in the team all-around event.

Nabeya died on 4 April 2010, at the age of 80.
