= Rolf Yelseth =

South African gymnast

- Full name: Rolf Harold Yelseth
- Born: 25 February 1914 Durban, Union of South Africa
- Died: 1968 (aged 53–54) Durban, South Africa

Gymnastics career
- Discipline: Men's artistic gymnastics
- Country represented: South Africa

Rolf Harold Yelseth (25 February 1914 – 1968) was a South African gymnast. He competed in seven events at the 1952 Summer Olympics.
