= Norbert Dietrich =

German gymnast

- Born: 24 January 1931 Bildstock, Territory of the Saar Basin
- Died: 5 July 2003 (aged 72) Sulzbach, Saarland, Germany

Gymnastics career
- Discipline: Men's artistic gymnastics
- Country represented: (Saar Protectorate) Saar
- Gym: Turnverein 1883 Bildstock

Norbert Dietrich (24 January 1931 – 5 July 2003) was a German gymnast. He competed in eight events at the 1952 Summer Olympics, representing Saar.

== See also ==
- Saar at the 1952 Summer Olympics
