= René Changeat =

French gymnast

- Full name: Hubert René Joseph Changeat
- Born: 31 December 1930 Lyon, France
- Died: 9 November 2012 (aged 81) Cournonsec, France
- Height: 1.75 m (5 ft 9 in)

Gymnastics career
- Discipline: Men's artistic gymnastics
- Country represented: France
Medal record
Men's artistic gymnastics
Representing France
Mediterranean Games
Gold medal – first place	1955 Barcelona	Vault
Silver medal – second place	1955 Barcelona	Team
Bronze medal – third place	1955 Barcelona	Floor

Hubert René Joseph Changeat (31 December 1930 – 9 November 2012) was a French gymnast. He competed in eight events at the 1952 Summer Olympics.
