= Georges Floquet =

French gymnast

- Full name: Georges Germain Floquet
- Born: 20 July 1920 Anor, France
- Died: 21 June 2007 (aged 86) Maubeuge, France
- Height: 1.62 m (5 ft 4 in)

Gymnastics career
- Discipline: Men's artistic gymnastics
- Country represented: France
- Gym: La Madeleinoise
Medal record
Men's artistic gymnastics
Representing France
Mediterranean Games
Gold medal – first place	1951 Alexandria	Team all-around
Gold medal – first place	1951 Alexandria	Team floor
Gold medal – first place	1951 Alexandria	Team pommel horse
Gold medal – first place	1951 Alexandria	Team rings
Gold medal – first place	1951 Alexandria	Team parallel bars
Silver medal – second place	1951 Alexandria	Team horizontal bar
Silver medal – second place	1959 Beirut	Team all-around
Bronze medal – third place	1951 Alexandria	Team vault

Georges Germain Floquet (20 July 1920 – 21 June 2007) was a French gymnast. He competed in eight events at the 1952 Summer Olympics.
