= Akitomo Kaneko =

Japanese gymnast (1927–2024)

- 金子 明友
- Born: 1 August 1927 Fukushima Prefecture, Empire of Japan
- Died: 24 December 2024 (aged 97)

Gymnastics career
- Discipline: Men's artistic gymnastics
- Country represented: Japan

Akitomo Kaneko (金子 明友, Kaneko Akitomo; 1 August 1927 – 24 December 2024) was a Japanese gymnast. He competed in eight events at the 1952 Summer Olympics. Kaneko died on 24 December 2024, at the age of 97.
