= Walter Lehmann (gymnast) =

Swiss gymnast

- Born: 13 January 1919
- Died: 23 September 2017 (aged 98)

Gymnastics career
- Discipline: Men's artistic gymnastics
- Country represented: Switzerland
Medal record
Olympic Games
Silver medal – second place	1948 London	Team
Silver medal – second place	1948 London	All-around
Silver medal – second place	1948 London	Horizontal bar
World Championships
Gold medal – first place	1950 Basel	Team
Gold medal – first place	1950 Basel	All-around
Gold medal – first place	1950 Basel	Rings
Bronze medal – third place	1950 Basel	Pommel horse
Bronze medal – third place	1950 Basel	Vault
Bronze medal – third place	1950 Basel	Horizontal bar

Walter Lehmann (13 January 1919 – 23 September 2017) was a Swiss gymnast, world champion and Olympic medalist. He competed at the 1948 Summer Olympics in London where he received silver medals in individual allround, horizontal bar and team combined exercises. Additionally, he competed at the 1950 World Artistic Gymnastics Championships, helping his team to gold, becoming World All-Around Champion, winning an individual gold medal on the rings apparatus, and winning individual bronze medals on the pommel horse, vault, and horizontal bars apparatuses.
