= Paweł Gaca =

Polish gymnast

- Born: 5 October 1917 Radlin, German Empire
- Died: 11 August 2008 (aged 90) Radlin, Poland
- Height: 1.65 m (5 ft 5 in)

Gymnastics career
- Discipline: Men's artistic gymnastics
- Country represented: Poland
- Club: Górnik Radlin

Paweł Gaca (5 October 1917 – 11 August 2008) was a Polish gymnast. He competed in eight events at the 1952 Summer Olympics.
