= Maurice De Groote =

Belgian gymnast

- Born: 24 September 1908
- Died: 10 November 1968 (aged 60)

Gymnastics career
- Discipline: Men's artistic gymnastics
- Country represented: Belgium

Maurice De Groote (24 September 1908 – 10 November 1968) was a Belgian gymnast. He competed in seven events at the 1952 Summer Olympics.
