= Artur Schmitt (gymnast) =

German gymnast

- Full name: Artur Ferdinand Adam Schmitt
- Born: 27 November 1910 Dudweiler, German Empire
- Died: 30 September 1989 (aged 78) Saarbrücken, West Germany

Gymnastics career
- Discipline: Men's artistic gymnastics
- Country represented: (Saar Protectorate) Saar
- Gym: Allgemeiner Sport Club Dudweiler

Artur Ferdinand Adam Schmitt (27 November 1910 – 30 September 1989) was a German gymnast. He competed in eight events at the 1952 Summer Olympics, representing Saar.

== See also ==
- Saar at the 1952 Summer Olympics
