= Jerzy Solarz =

Polish gymnast

- Full name: Jerzy Michał Solarz
- Born: 12 February 1930 Kraków, Second Polish Republic
- Died: 30 December 1984 (aged 54) Kraków, Polish People's Republic
- Height: 1.70 m (5 ft 7 in)

Gymnastics career
- Discipline: Men's artistic gymnastics
- Country represented: Poland
- Club: Włókniarz Kraków

Jerzy Michał Solarz (12 February 1930 – 30 December 1984) was a Polish gymnast. He competed in eight events at the 1952 Summer Olympics.
