= Carol Bedö =

Romanian gymnast

- Alternative name: Károly Bedő
- Born: 13 December 1930 Aiud, Kingdom of Romania

Gymnastics career
- Discipline: Men's artistic gymnastics
- Country represented: Romania

Carol Bedö (13 December 1930 – 3 February 2020) was a Romanian gymnast. He competed in eight events at the 1952 Summer Olympics.
