= Börje Stattin =

Swedish gymnast (1930–2020)

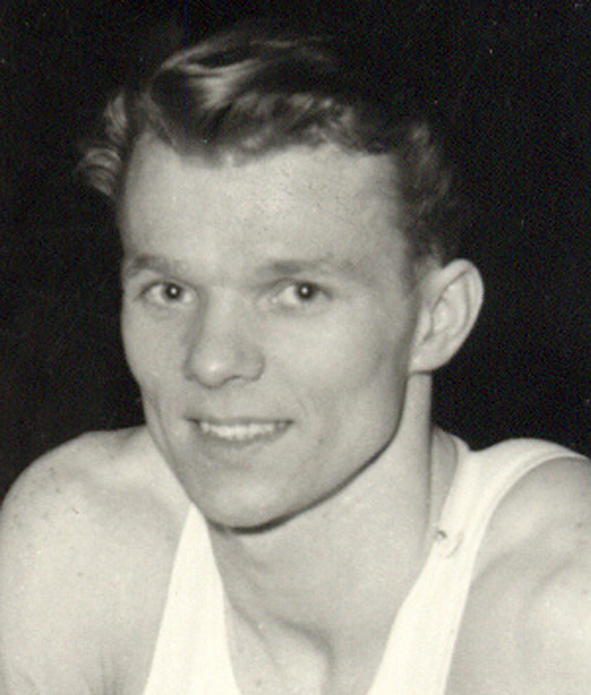
- Stattin c. 1950s

Personal information
- Full name: Knut Börje Georg Stattin
- Born: 13 February 1930 Gävle, Sweden
- Died: 4 April 2020 (aged 90) Gävle, Sweden

Gymnastics career
- Discipline: Men's artistic gymnastics
- Country represented: Sweden
- Gym: Gefle Gymnastikförening

Knut Börje Georg Stattin (13 February 1930 – 4 April 2020) was a Swedish gymnast. He competed in all gymnastics events at the 1952 Summer Olympics with the best individual result of 32nd place on horizontal bar. Stattin died on 4 April 2020.
