= Jeroom Riske =

Belgian gymnast (1919–2000)

- Full name: Jeroom Marie Riske
- Born: 14 August 1919
- Died: 17 December 2000 (aged 81)
- Relatives: Hector Riské (brother)

Gymnastics career
- Discipline: Men's artistic gymnastics
- Country represented: Belgium

Jeroom Marie Riske (14 August 1919 – 17 December 2000) was a Belgian gymnast. He competed in seven events at the 1952 Summer Olympics.
