= Károly Kocsis =

Hungarian gymnast (1929–2016)

- Born: 27 July 1929 Debrecen, Kingdom of Hungary
- Died: 17 December 2016 (aged 87)
- Spouse: Mária Kövi-Zalai

Gymnastics career
- Discipline: Men's artistic gymnastics
- Country represented: Hungary
- Club: Újpesti Tornaegylet

Károly Kocsis (27 July 1929 – 17 December 2016) was a Hungarian gymnast. He competed in eight events at the 1952 Summer Olympics. Kocsis died on 17 December 2016, at the age of 87.
