= Fabio Bonacina =

Italian gymnast

- Born: 26 July 1923 Lecco, Kingdom of Italy
- Died: 17 March 2012 (aged 88) Angera, Italy

Gymnastics career
- Discipline: Men's artistic gymnastics
- Country represented: Italy

Fabio Bonacina (26 July 1923 – 17 March 2012) was an Italian gymnast. He competed in eight events at the 1952 Summer Olympics.
