= Silvio Brivio =

Italian gymnast

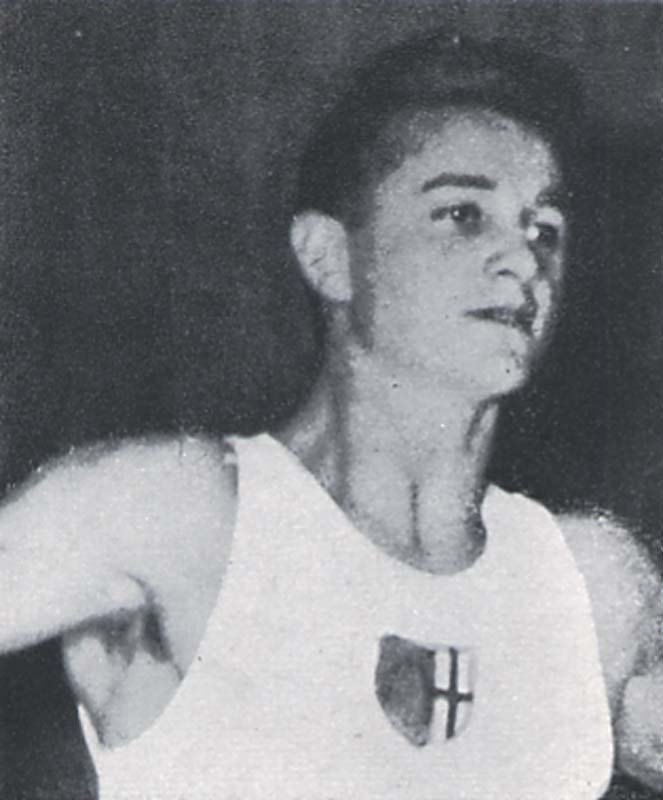
- Brivio in Helsinki, 1952

Personal information
- Born: 6 November 1929 Como, Kingdom of Italy
- Died: 3 November 2010 (aged 80) Como, Italy

Gymnastics career
- Discipline: Men's artistic gymnastics
- Country represented: Italy
- Club: Pro Patria Milano

Silvio Brivio (6 November 1929 – 3 November 2010) was an Italian gymnast. He competed in eight events at the 1952 Summer Olympics.
