= Mihai Botez (gymnast) =

Romanian gymnast

- Born: 31 May 1922 Oradea Mare, Kingdom of Romania
- Died: 8 December 2011 (aged 89) Arad, Romania

Gymnastics career
- Discipline: Men's artistic gymnastics
- Country represented: Romania

Mihai Botez (31 May 1922 – 8 December 2011) was a Romanian gymnast. He competed in eight events at the 1952 Summer Olympics.
