= Georg Johansen =

Norwegian gymnast

- Full name: Einar Georg Johansen
- Born: 3 May 1924 Tune, Norway
- Died: 4 July 1999 (aged 75) Sarpsborg, Norway

Gymnastics career
- Discipline: Men's artistic gymnastics
- Country represented: Norway
- Gym: Oslo Turnforening

Einar Georg Johansen (3 May 1924 – 4 July 1999) was a Norwegian gymnast. He competed in eight events at the 1952 Summer Olympics.
