= Joaquim Granger =

Portuguese gymnast (1928–2026)

- Full name: Joaquim Pedro de Santa Marta Granger
- Born: 31 May 1928 Leiria, Portugal
- Died: 17 April 2026 (aged 97)

Gymnastics career
- Discipline: Men's artistic gymnastics
- Country represented: Portugal
- Club: Lisboa Ginásio Clube

Joaquim Pedro de Santa Marta Granger (31 May 1928 – 17 April 2026) was a Portuguese gymnast. He competed in eight events at the 1952 Summer Olympics.

Granger died on 17 April 2026, at the age of 97.
