= Jindřich Mikulec =

Czech gymnast (1928–2026)

Personal information
- Born: 11 May 1928 Rokytnice, Czechoslovakia
- Died: 7 July 2026 (aged 98) Czech Republic

Gymnastics career
- Discipline: Men's artistic gymnastics
- Country represented: Czechoslovakia

Jindřich Mikulec (11 May 1928 – 7 July 2026) was a Czech gymnast. He competed in eight events at the 1952 Summer Olympics.

Mikulec died on 7 July 2026, at the age of 98.
