= Heinz Ostheimer =

German gymnast (1931–2023)

- Born: 15 September 1931 Bexbach, Territory of the Saar Basin
- Died: 9 July 2023 (aged 91) Bexbach, Saarland, Germany

Gymnastics career
- Discipline: Men's artistic gymnastics
- Country represented: (Saar Protectorate) Saar
- Gym: Turnverein Bexbach 1886

Heinz Ostheimer (15 September 1931 – 9 July 2023) was a German gymnast. He competed in eight events at the 1952 Summer Olympics, representing Saar. He was the last surviving competitor of the Saar Olympic team.

Ostheimer died in Bexbach on 9 July 2023, at the age of 91.

== See also ==
- Saar at the 1952 Summer Olympics
