= Walter Bach =

Swiss gymnast

- Born: December 10, 1909
- Died: October 12, 1991 (aged 81)

Gymnastics career
- Discipline: Men's artistic gymnastics
- Country represented: Switzerland
Medal record
Men's gymnastics
Representing Switzerland
Olympic Games
Silver medal – second place	1936 Berlin	Team
World Championships
Gold medal – first place	1934 Budapest	Team
Bronze medal – third place	1934 Budapest	Parallel bars

Walter Bach (10 December 1909 - 12 October 1991) was a Swiss artistic gymnast who competed in the 1936 Summer Olympics. Additionally, he competed at the 1934 World Artistic Gymnastics Championships where he helped his Swiss team to gold and individually took a bronze medal on the parallel bars apparatus.
