= Magne Kleiven =

Norwegian gymnast

- Born: 27 July 1921 Lillehammer, Norway
- Died: 5 June 1999 (aged 77) Volda, Norway

Gymnastics career
- Discipline: Men's artistic gymnastics
- Country represented: Norway
- Gym: Lillehammer Turnforening

Magne Kleiven (27 July 1921 – 5 June 1999) was a Norwegian gymnast. He competed in eight events at the 1952 Summer Olympics.
