= Fred Wiedersporn =

German gymnast

- Full name: Alfred Wiedersporn
- Born: 19 October 1931 Schwalbach, Territory of the Saar Basin
- Died: 8 January 2016 (aged 84) Völklingen, Germany

Gymnastics career
- Discipline: Men's artistic gymnastics
- Country represented: (Saar Protectorate) Saar
- Gym: Turnverein 1894 Schwalbach

Alfred Wiedersporn (19 October 1931 – 8 January 2016) was a German gymnast. He competed in eight events at the 1952 Summer Olympics, representing Saar.

== See also ==
- Saar at the 1952 Summer Olympics
