= Frederik De Waele =

Belgian gymnast (1919–2001)

- Born: 16 June 1919 Zele, Belgium
- Died: 20 August 2001 (aged 82) Dendermonde, Belgium

Gymnastics career
- Discipline: Men's artistic gymnastics
- Country represented: Belgium

Frederik De Waele (16 June 1919 – 20 August 2001) was a Belgian gymnast. He competed in seven events at the 1952 Summer Olympics.
