= Zdzisław Lesiński =

Polish gymnast

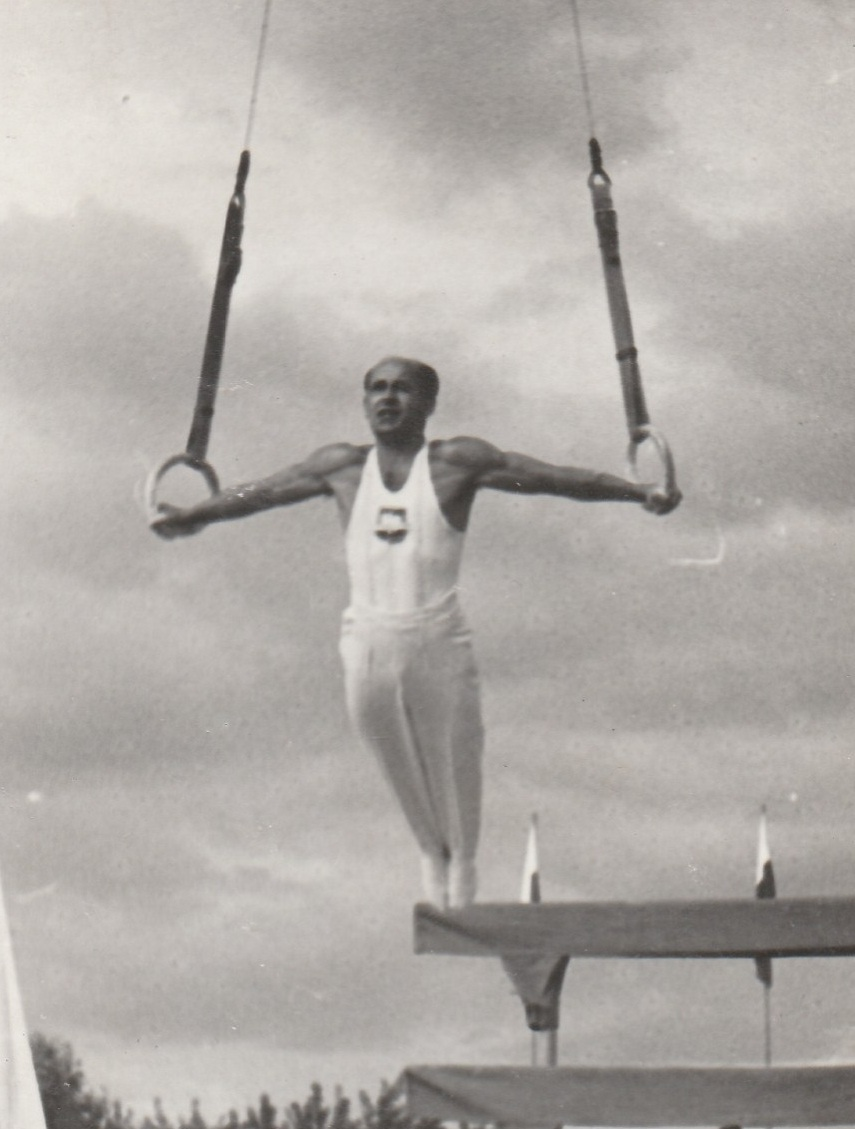

Personal information
- Born: 19 September 1921 Poznań, Second Polish Republic
- Died: 22 August 2000 (aged 78) Poznań, Poland
- Height: 1.59 m (5 ft 3 in)

Gymnastics career
- Discipline: Men's artistic gymnastics
- Country represented: Poland
- Club: Warta Poznań

Zdzisław Lesiński (19 September 1921 – 22 August 2000) was a Polish gymnast. He competed in eight events at the 1952 Summer Olympics.
