= Littorio Sampieri =

Italian gymnast

- Born: 16 July 1927 Forlì, Kingdom of Italy
- Died: 25 July 1979 (aged 52) Staouéli, Algeria

Gymnastics career
- Discipline: Men's artistic gymnastics
- Country represented: Italy

Littorio Sampieri (16 July 1927 – 25 July 1979) was an Italian gymnast. He competed in eight events at the 1952 Summer Olympics.
