= Erich Peters =

Swedish gymnast

- Full name: Ernst Erich Otto Peters
- Born: 11 March 1920 Kreuzlingen, Switzerland
- Died: 20 December 2012 (aged 92) Arbon, Switzerland

Gymnastics career
- Discipline: Men's artistic gymnastics
- Country represented: Sweden
- Gym: Sandvikens Gymnastikavdelningar

Ernst Erich Otto Peters (March 11, 1920 – December 20, 2012) was a Swedish gymnast who competed at the 1952 Summer Olympics in Helsinki. He had his best individual finish in the men's parallel bars event, where he placed 74th. He also competed with the Swedish team in the all-around tournament, coming 17th out of 23 nations. He was born in Kreuzlingen, Switzerland and competed out of Sandvikens Gymnastikavdelning.
