= Raymond Badin =

French gymnast

- Full name: Raymond Maurice Badin
- Born: 19 March 1928 Mâcon, France
- Died: 1 March 2000 (aged 71) Lyon, France

Gymnastics career
- Discipline: Men's artistic gymnastics
- Country represented: France
Medal record
Men's artistic gymnastics
Representing France
World Championships
Bronze medal – third place	1950 Basel	Team

Raymond Maurice Badin (19 March 1928 – 1 March 2000) was a French gymnast. He competed in eight events at the 1952 Summer Olympics.
