= Paweł Gawron =

Polish gymnast

- Full name: Paweł Jan Gawron
- Born: 23 March 1921 Rydułtowy, Weimar Republic
- Died: 1 October 1983 (aged 62) Rydułtowy, Polish People's Republic
- Height: 1.69 m (5 ft 7 in)

Gymnastics career
- Discipline: Men's artistic gymnastics
- Country represented: Poland
- Club: Górnik Radlin

Paweł Jan Gawron (23 March 1921 – 1 October 1983) was a Polish gymnast. He competed in eight events at the 1952 Summer Olympics.
