= Rolf Lauer =

German gymnast

- Born: 11 September 1931 Bildstock, Territory of the Saar Basin
- Died: 25 May 1986 (aged 54) Völklingen, West Germany

Gymnastics career
- Discipline: Men's artistic gymnastics
- Country represented: (Saar Protectorate) Saar
- Gym: Turnverein 1883 Bildstock

Rolf Lauer (11 September 1931 – 25 May 1986) was a German gymnast. He competed in eight events at the 1952 Summer Olympics, representing Saar.

== See also ==
- Saar at the 1952 Summer Olympics
