= Raymond Dot =

French gymnast

- Full name: Raymond Camille Dot
- Born: 20 December 1925 Puteaux, France
- Died: 30 June 2015 (aged 89)

Gymnastics career
- Discipline: Men's artistic gymnastics
- Country represented: France
Medal record
Representing France
Men's Gymnastics
World Championships
Bronze medal – third place	1950 Basel	Team
Bronze medal – third place	1950 Basel	Floor
Bronze medal – third place	1950 Basel	Parallel bars

Raymond Camille Dot (20 December 1926 – 30 June 2015) was a French gymnast. He competed at the 1948 Summer Olympics, the 1952 Summer Olympics and the 1956 Summer Olympics. Additionally, he competed at the 1950 World Artistic Gymnastics Championships where he helped his French team to the bronze and won individual bronze medals in both the floor and parallel bars apparatuses.
