= Marcel de Wolf =

French gymnast

- Full name: Marcel Henri Joseph de Wolf
- Born: 19 September 1919 Trith-Saint-Léger, France
- Died: 30 March 1999 (aged 79) Bourges, France

Gymnastics career
- Discipline: Men's artistic gymnastics
- Country represented: France
Medal record
Men's artistic gymnastics
Representing France
World Championships
Bronze medal – third place	1950 Basel	Team

Marcel Henri Joseph de Wolf (19 September 1919 – 30 March 1999) was a French gymnast. He competed at the 1948 Summer Olympics and the 1952 Summer Olympics.
