= Olavi Rove =

Finnish gymnast

- Born: 29 July 1915 Helsinki, Finland
- Died: 22 May 1966 (aged 50) Helsinki, Finland

Gymnastics career
- Discipline: Men's artistic gymnastics
- Country represented: Finland
Medal record
Representing Finland
Men's Gymnastic
Olympic Games
Gold medal – first place	1948 London	Team
Silver medal – second place	1948 London	Vault
Bronze medal – third place	1952 Helsinki	Team
World Championships
Silver medal – second place	1950 Basel	Team
Silver medal – second place	1950 Basel	Rings
Silver medal – second place	1950 Basel	Vault
Silver medal – second place	1950 Basel	Parallel bars
Bronze medal – third place	1950 Basel	All-around

Olavi Rove (29 July 1915 – 22 May 1966) was a Finnish gymnast and Olympic Champion.

He was born and died in Helsinki.

He competed at the 1948 Summer Olympics in London where he received a gold medal in team combined exercises, and a silver medal in vault.

At the 1952 Summer Olympics in Helsinki, he received a bronze medal in team combined exercises with the Finnish team. Additionally, he competed at the 1950 World Artistic Gymnastics Championships, where he helped his team win the silver medal, won individual silver medals in the rings, vault, and parallel bars apparatuses, and won an individual bronze in the individual all-around combined exercises.
