= Vladimír Kejř =

Czech gymnast

- Born: 20 January 1929 Úvaly, Czechoslovakia
- Died: 9 May 1981 (aged 52)

Gymnastics career
- Discipline: Men's artistic gymnastics
- Country represented: Czechoslovakia

Vladimír Kejř (20 January 1929 – 9 May 1981) was a Czech gymnast. He competed at the 1952 Summer Olympics and the 1956 Summer Olympics.
