= Vladimir Belyakov =

Soviet gymnast (1918–1996)

Gymnastics career
- Discipline: Men's artistic gymnastics
- Country represented: Soviet Union
Medal record
Olympic Games
Gold medal – first place	1952 Helsinki	Team competition

Vladimir Timofeevich Belyakov (Russian: Влади́мир Тимофе́евич Беляко́в, 2 January 1918, Dmitrov – 21 May 1996, Moscow) was a Soviet gymnast.

Belyakov worked at the Central State Institute of Physical Culture in Moscow (1951), competed for Dynamo Moscow. Associated professor of Lomonosov Moscow State University (Chair of physical education). Author of the books "Sportsmanship of soviet gymnasts" and "Essays about soviet gymnasts".

== Achievements ==
- Title Meritorious master of sport of USSR (1947)
- Title Meritorious coach of RSFSR (1960)
- International-level judge (1962)
- 1946 USSR champion in Vault
- 1940, 1947 USSR champion in Parallel bars
- 1939, 1940, 1943–1945, 1947 USSR champion in Floor exercise
- 1944, 1947 USSR All-around champion
- 1952 Olympic champion (team)
