= Jean Guillou (gymnast) =

French gymnast (1931–2019)

- Full name: Jean François Guillou
- Born: 24 June 1931 Plouédern, France
- Died: 28 August 2019 (aged 88) La Seyne-sur-Mer, France
- Height: 1.58 m (5 ft 2 in)

Gymnastics career
- Discipline: Men's artistic gymnastics
- Country represented: France
- Gym: Avenir Bouillonnaise
Medal record
Men's artistic gymnastics
Representing France
Mediterranean Games
Silver medal – second place	1955 Barcelona	Team
Bronze medal – third place	1963 Napoli	Team

Jean François Guillou (24 June 1931 – 28 August 2019) was a French gymnast. He competed at the 1952 Summer Olympics and the 1956 Summer Olympics.
