= Armand Huberty =

Luxembourgish gymnast (1930–2018)

- Born: 16 August 1930 Esch-sur-Alzette, Luxembourg
- Died: 10 March 2018 (aged 87) Luxembourg City, Luxembourg
- Height: 1.73 m (5 ft 8 in)

Gymnastics career
- Discipline: Men's artistic gymnastics
- Country represented: Luxembourg

Armand Huberty (16 August 1930 – 10 March 2018) was a Luxembourgish gymnast. He competed at the 1952 Summer Olympics and the 1960 Summer Olympics. Huberty died in Luxembourg City on 10 March 2018, at the age of 87.
