= Dmytro Leonkin =

Soviet gymnast (1928–1980)

- Дмитро Максимович Леонкін
- Full name: Dmytro Maksymovych Leonkin
- Alternative names: Dmitry Maksimovich Leonkin; Дмитрий Максимович Леонкин
- Born: 16 December 1928 Mys Dobroy Nadezhdy, Russian SFSR, Soviet Union
- Died: 1980 (aged 51–52) Lviv, Ukrainian SSR, Soviet Union

Gymnastics career
- Discipline: Men's artistic gymnastics
- Country represented: Soviet Union
- Club: Sportivny Klub Vooruzhyonny Sily Lviv
Medal record
Men's artistic gymnastics
Representing Soviet Union
Olympic Games
Gold medal – first place	1952 Helsinki	Team
Bronze medal – third place	1952 Helsinki	Rings

Dmytro Maksymovych Leonkin (16 December 1928 – 1980) was a Soviet gymnast who competed in the 1952 Summer Olympics, and presented athletes of the Ukrainian SSR. Dmytro Leonkin was born in Ryazan Governorate, Russian SFSR.
