= Ernst Gebendinger =

Swiss gymnast (1926–2017)

- Born: 10 December 1926 Winterthur, Switzerland
- Died: 23 May 2017 (aged 91) Winterthur, Switzerland

Gymnastics career
- Discipline: Men's artistic gymnastics
- Country represented: Switzerland
Medal record
Men's gymnastics
Representing Switzerland
Olympic Games
Silver medal – second place	1952 Helsinki	Team
World Championships
Gold medal – first place	1950 Basel	Team
Gold medal – first place	1950 Basel	Floor
Gold medal – first place	1950 Basel	Vault

Ernst Gebendinger (10 February 1926 – 23 May 2017) was a Swiss gymnast. At the 1950 World Artistic Gymnastics Championships in Basel he won three gold medals: In Floor exercise (together with Josef Stalder), Vault and with the Swiss team. He competed in the 1952 Summer Olympics. After an accident 1954 he had to end his career.
