= Mincho Todorov =

Bulgarian gymnast (1931–2022)

- Минчо Станчев Тодоров
- Full name: Mincho Stanchev Todorov
- Born: 26 December 1931 Krivnya, Bulgaria
- Died: 2 August 2022 (aged 90) Mexico

Gymnastics career
- Discipline: Men's artistic gymnastics
- Country represented: Bulgaria

Mincho Stanchev Todorov (Bulgarian: Минчо Станчев Тодоров) (26 December 1931 – 2 August 2022) was a Bulgarian former gymnast. He competed at the 1952 Summer Olympics and the 1956 Summer Olympics.
