= Iosif Berdiev =

Soviet gymnast (1924–1992)

Gymnastics career
- Discipline: Men's artistic gymnastics
- Country represented: Soviet Union
Medal record
Olympic Games
Gold medal – first place	1952 Helsinki	Team competition

Iosif Konstantinovich Berdiev (Russian: Иосиф Константинович Бердиев, 26 November 1924, Poltoratsk - 27 February 1992, Kyiv, Ukraine) was a Soviet gymnast.

Berdiev was High coach school of Leningrad Military Institute of Physical Culture and Sport (1953), competed for SKA (Leningrad).

== Achievements ==
- Title Meritorious master of sport of USSR (1955)
- 1948-1953, 1955 USSR champion in Vault
- 1952 Olympic champion (team)
