= Stoyan Stoyanov (gymnast) =

Bulgarian gymnast (born 1931)

- Стоян Коев Стоянов
- Full name: Stoyan Koev Stoyanov
- Born: 25 October 1931 Nikolovo, Ruse Province, Bulgaria

Gymnastics career
- Discipline: Men's artistic gymnastics
- Country represented: Bulgaria

Stoyan Koev Stoyanov (Bulgarian: Стоян Коев Стоянов) (born 25 October 1931) is a Bulgarian gymnast. He competed at the 1952 Summer Olympics, the 1956 Summer Olympics and the 1960 Summer Olympics.
