= Jack Günthard =

Swiss gymnast

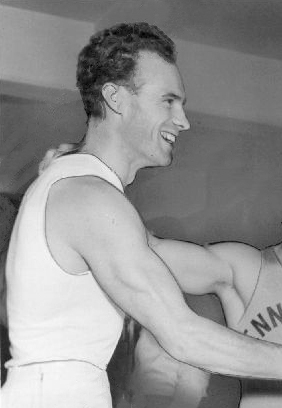
- Günthard in 1956

Personal information
- Born: 8 January 1920 Hirzel, Switzerland
- Died: 7 August 2016 (aged 96)

Gymnastics career
- Discipline: Men's artistic gymnastics
- Country represented: Switzerland
Medal record
Olympic Games
Gold medal – first place	1952 Helsinki	Horizontal bar
Silver medal – second place	1952 Helsinki	Team
World Championships
Gold medal – first place	1950 Basel	Team
Bronze medal – third place	1954 Rome	Team
European championships
Gold medal – first place	1957 Paris	Parallel bars
Gold medal – first place	1957 Paris	Horizontal bar

Jakob "Jack" Günthard (8 January 1920 – 7 August 2016) was a Swiss artistic gymnast. He competed at the 1952 Summer Olympics in Helsinki, where he won the gold medal in the horizontal bar, and the silver medal in the team combined exercises. Günthard died in August 2016 at the age of 96.
