= Ahmed Issam Allam =

Egyptian gymnast (born 1931)

Ahmed Allam
- أحمد عصام علام
- Full name: Ahmed Issam Allam
- Born: 13 September 1931 Cairo, Kingdom of Egypt

Gymnastics career
- Discipline: Men's artistic gymnastics
- Country represented: United Arab Republic
- Former countries represented: Egypt
Medal record
Men's artistic gymnastics
Event	1st	2nd	3rd
Mediterranean Games	4	3	6
Total	4	3	6
Representing Egypt
Mediterranean Games
Gold medal – first place	1951 Alexandria	Team vault
Silver medal – second place	1951 Alexandria	Team floor
Silver medal – second place	1951 Alexandria	Team rings
Silver medal – second place	1951 Alexandria	Team parallel bars
Bronze medal – third place	1951 Alexandria	Team all-around
Bronze medal – third place	1951 Alexandria	Team pommel
Bronze medal – third place	1951 Alexandria	Team horizontal bar
Bronze medal – third place	1951 Alexandria	Vault
Bronze medal – third place	1955 Barcelona	Team
Bronze medal – third place	1955 Barcelona	Horizontal bar
Representing United Arab Republic
Mediterranean Games
Gold medal – first place	1959 Beirut	Team
Gold medal – first place	1959 Beirut	Floor
Gold medal – first place	1959 Beirut	Vault

Ahmed Issam Allam (born 13 September 1931) is an Egyptian gymnast. He competed at the 1952 Summer Olympics and the 1960 Summer Olympics.
