= Michel Mathiot =

French gymnast

- Born: 23 August 1926 Besançon, France
- Died: 2 February 1999 (aged 72) Lons-le-Saunier, France
- Height: 1.63 m (5 ft 4 in)

Gymnastics career
- Discipline: Men's artistic gymnastics
- Country represented: France
- Gym: Besançon
Medal record
Men's artistic gymnastics
Representing France
World Championships
| Bronze medal – third place | 1950 Basel | Team all-around |
Mediterranean Games
| Gold medal – first place | 1951 Alexandria | Team all-around |
| Gold medal – first place | 1951 Alexandria | Team floor |
| Gold medal – first place | 1951 Alexandria | Team pommel horse |
| Gold medal – first place | 1951 Alexandria | Team rings |
| Gold medal – first place | 1951 Alexandria | Team parallel bars |
| Gold medal – first place | 1951 Alexandria | Pommel horse |
| Gold medal – first place | 1959 Beirut | Pommel horse |
| Silver medal – second place | 1951 Alexandria | Team horizontal bar |
| Silver medal – second place | 1955 Barcelona | Team all-around |
| Silver medal – second place | 1955 Barcelona | Individual all-around |
| Silver medal – second place | 1955 Barcelona | Pommel horse |
| Silver medal – second place | 1959 Beirut | Team all-around |
| Silver medal – second place | 1959 Beirut | Horizontal bar |
| Bronze medal – third place | 1951 Alexandria | Team vault |
| Bronze medal – third place | 1955 Barcelona | Parallel bars |

Michel Mathiot (23 August 1926 – 2 February 1999) was a French gymnast. He competed at the 1948, 1952, 1956 and the 1960 Summer Olympics.
