= Kurt Wigartz =

Swedish gymnast

- Full name: Kurt Anders Artur Wigartz
- Born: 21 March 1933 Mariestad, Sweden
- Died: 5 January 2017 (aged 83) Lidingö, Sweden
- Height: 1.68 m (5 ft 6 in)

Gymnastics career
- Discipline: Men's artistic gymnastics
- Country represented: Sweden
- Gym: Arbetarnas Gymnastikförening

Kurt Anders Artur Wigartz (21 March 1933 – 5 January 2017) was a Swedish gymnast. He competed at the 1952 Summer Olympics, the 1956 Summer Olympics and the 1960 Summer Olympics.
