= Graham Harcourt =

British gymnast (1934–2015)

- Full name: Kenneth Graham Harcourt
- Born: 16 April 1934 Swansea, Wales
- Died: 6 May 2015 (aged 81) Swansea, Wales

Gymnastics career
- Discipline: Men's artistic gymnastics
- Country represented: (United Kingdom) Great Britain

Kenneth Graham Harcourt (16 April 1934 – 6 May 2015) was a British gymnast. He competed in eight events at the 1952 Summer Olympics, which he considered as his greatest success.

== Early life ==
In his early years, Harcourt was playing rugby, but because of his father's advice to focus on one discipline, he chose gymnastics and joined Swansea YMCA Gymnastic Club. During his early career as a teenage gymnast, he was successful in local competitions and won Junior Welsh Championships when he was 14. He continued his training under Walter Walsh and Arthur Whitford.

== Gymnastics career ==
Harcourt's major breakthrough achievement was placing 4th in the British Championships in 1952 at the age of 17 - it secured him a place in the British Olympic team at the 1952 Summer Olympics. After the Olympics, he had to do compulsory National Service and did not train for about two years. This, connected with progressing arthritis which started in his spine, resulted in him not qualifying for the 1956 Summer Olympics.

== Post-gymnastics career ==
After retiring from gymnastics, he helped to develop a family printing business in Swansea and coached British Olympian Andrew Morris.
