= Hubert Erang =

Luxembourgish gymnast (1931–2022)

- Born: 4 March 1931 Esch-sur-Alzette, Luxembourg
- Died: 4 July 2022 (aged 91) Bettembourg, Luxembourg
- Height: 1.71 m (5 ft 7 in)
- Relatives: Mathias Erang (father)

Gymnastics career
- Discipline: Men's artistic gymnastics
- Country represented: Luxembourg

Hubert Erang (4 March 1931 – 4 July 2022) was a Luxembourgish gymnast. He competed at the 1952 Summer Olympics and the 1960 Summer Olympics.
