= Frederic Orendi =

Romanian gymnast

- Alternative name: Friedrich Siegfried Orendi
- Born: 12 March 1930 Mediaș, Kingdom of Romania
- Died: 19 July 1993 (aged 63) Uhingen, Germany
- Height: 1.70 m (5 ft 7 in)

Gymnastics career
- Discipline: Men's artistic gymnastics
- Country represented: Romania

Frederic Orendi (12 March 1930 – 19 July 1993) was a Romanian gymnast. He competed at the 1952 Summer Olympics and the 1964 Summer Olympics.
