= Kalevi Viskari =

Finnish gymnast (1928–2018)

- Born: 15 June 1928 Enso, Finland
- Died: 13 November 2018 (aged 90) Vantaa, Finland

Gymnastics career
- Discipline: Men's artistic gymnastics
- Country represented: Finland
Medal record
Olympic Games
Bronze medal – third place	1952 Helsinki	Team all-around
World Championships
Silver medal – second place	1950 Basel	Team all-around

Kalevi Viskari (15 June 1928 – 13 November 2018) was a Finnish gymnast who competed in the 1952 Summer Olympics. He was born in Enso.
