= Guido Figone =

Italian gymnast

- Full name: Guido Giovanni Figone
- Born: 13 October 1927 Chiavari, Kingdom of Italy
- Died: 24 November 1998 (aged 71) Sestri Levante, Italy

Gymnastics career
- Discipline: Men's artistic gymnastics
- Country represented: Italy
- Gym: ASD Ginnastica Pro Chiavari

Guido Giovanni Figone (13 October 1927 – 24 November 1998) was an Italian gymnast. He competed at the 1948 Summer Olympics and the 1952 Summer Olympics.
