= Jean Tschabold =

Swiss gymnast

- Full name: Jean Louis Tschabold
- Born: 15 December 1925 Epalinges, Switzerland
- Died: 29 April 2012 (aged 86) Epalinges, Switzerland

Gymnastics career
- Country represented: Switzerland
Medal record
Men's artistic gymnastics
Representing Switzerland
Olympic Games
Silver medal – second place	1952 Helsinki	Team
World Championships
Gold medal – first place	1950 Basel	Team
Bronze medal – third place	1954 Rome	Team

Jean Tschabold (15 December 1925 – 29 April 2012) was a Swiss gymnast. He competed in eight events at the 1952 Summer Olympics winning a silver medal in the team all-round event.
