= Hans Eugster =

Swiss gymnast

- Born: 27 March 1929
- Died: 12 November 1956 (aged 27)

Gymnastics career
- Discipline: Men's artistic gymnastics
- Country represented: Switzerland
Medal record
Olympic Games
Gold medal – first place	1952 Helsinki	Parallel bars
Silver medal – second place	1952 Helsinki	Team
Bronze medal – third place	1952 Helsinki	Rings
World Championships
Gold medal – first place	1950 Basel	Team
Gold medal – first place	1950 Basel	Parallel bars
Bronze medal – third place	1950 Basel	Rings
Bronze medal – third place	1954 Rome	Team
Bronze medal – third place	1954 Rome	Parallel bars

Hans Eugster (27 March 1929 – 12 November 1956) was a Swiss gymnast and Olympic Champion.

He competed at the 1952 Summer Olympics in Helsinki, where he received a gold medal in parallel bars, a silver medal in team combined exercises, and a bronze medal in rings.
