= Luigi Zanetti =

Italian gymnast

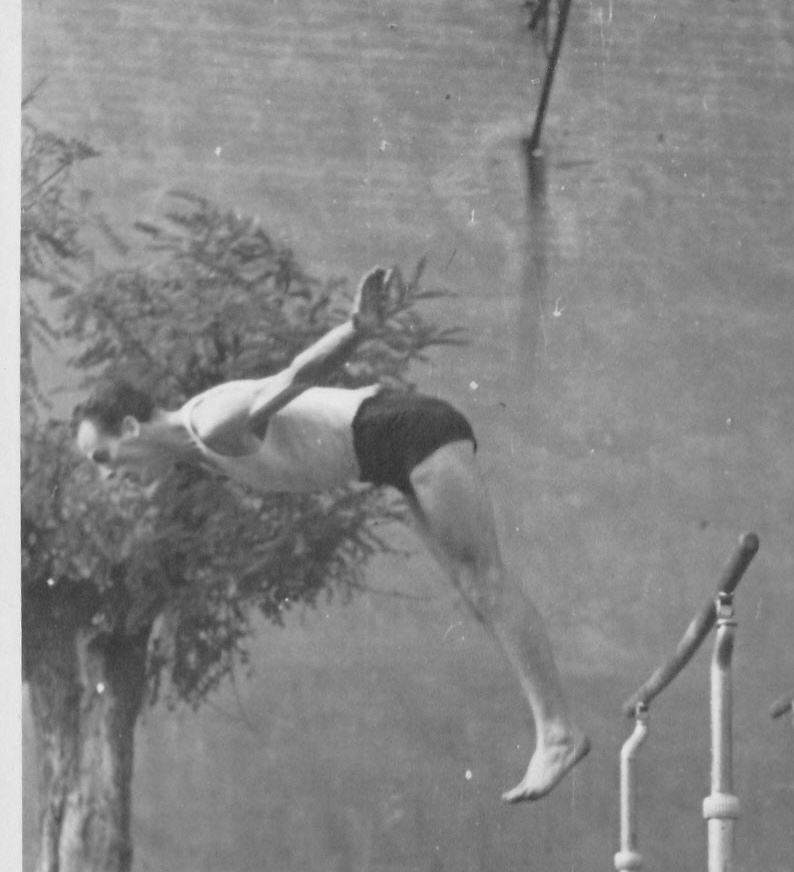

Personal information
- Born: 20 September 1921 Padua, Kingdom of Italy
- Died: 9 June 2008 (aged 86) Padua, Italy

Gymnastics career
- Discipline: Men's artistic gymnastics
- Country represented: Italy
- Club: Società Ginnastica Etruria 1897

Luigi Zanetti (20 September 1921 – 9 November 2008) was an Italian gymnast. He competed at the 1948 Summer Olympics and the 1952 Summer Olympics.
