= Kalevi Laitinen (gymnast) =

Finnish gymnast

- Full name: Kalevi Johannes Laitinen
- Born: 19 May 1918 Kotka, Finland
- Died: 6 January 1997 (aged 78) Kotka, Finland

Gymnastics career
- Discipline: Men's artistic gymnastics
- Country represented: Finland
Medal record
Men's artistic gymnastics
Representing Finland
Olympic Games
Gold medal – first place	1948 London	Team
Bronze medal – third place	1952 Helsinki	Team

Kalevi Johannes Laitinen (19 May 1918 – 6 January 1997) was a Finnish gymnast and Olympic champion.

He was born and died in Kotka.

Laitinen competed at the 1948 Summer Olympics in London, where he won a gold medal in team combined exercises with the Finnish squad. At the 1952 Summer Olympics in Helsinki, he won a bronze medal in the same event with the Finnish team.
