= Josef Stalder =

Swiss gymnast

- Born: 6 February 1919
- Died: 2 March 1991 (aged 72)

Gymnastics career
- Discipline: Men's artistic gymnastics
- Country represented: Switzerland
Medal record
Olympic Games
Gold medal – first place	1948 London	Horizontal bar
Silver medal – second place	1948 London	Team
Silver medal – second place	1952 Helsinki	Team
Silver medal – second place	1952 Helsinki	Horizontal bar
Bronze medal – third place	1948 London	Parallel bars
Bronze medal – third place	1952 Helsinki	All-around
Bronze medal – third place	1952 Helsinki	Parallel bars
World Championships
Gold medal – first place	1950 Basel	Team
Gold medal – first place	1950 Basel	Floor exercise
Gold medal – first place	1950 Basel	Pommel horse
Silver medal – second place	1954 Rome	Pommel horse
Silver medal – second place	1954 Rome	Parallel bars
Bronze medal – third place	1950 Basel	Horizontal bar
Bronze medal – third place	1954 Rome	Team

Josef Stalder (6 February 1919 – 2 March 1991) was a Swiss gymnast and Olympic champion.

== Career ==
He competed at the 1948 Summer Olympics in London, where he received a gold medal on the horizontal bar, a silver medal in team combined exercises, and a bronze medal on the parallel bars. He also won four medals at the 1952 Summer Olympics in Helsinki.

He was the originator and namesake of stalder circles, now a common skill on both the horizontal bar and the uneven bars.

He was inducted posthumously to the International Gymnastics Hall of Fame as a member of the Class of 2024.

Awards
Preceded by (Switzerland) Hugo Koblet	Swiss Sportspersonality of the year 1952	Succeeded by (Switzerland) Alfred Bickel
