= Melchior Thalmann =

Swiss gymnast

- Born: 21 May 1924
- Died: 28 August 2013 (aged 89)

Gymnastics career
- Discipline: Men's artistic gymnastics
- Country represented: Switzerland
- Gym: Turnverein Oerlikon
Medal record
Men's artistic gymnastics
Representing Switzerland
Olympic Games
| Silver medal – second place | 1948 London | Team |
| Silver medal – second place | 1952 Helsinki | Team |
World Championships
| Gold medal – first place | 1950 Basel | Team |
| Bronze medal – third place | 1954 Rome | Team |

Melchior Thalmann (21 May 1924 – 28 August 2013) was a Swiss gymnast who competed in the 1948 Summer Olympics and in the 1952 Summer Olympics. He won also the worlds championship in 1950 in Rome, Italy and competed in Basel, Switzerland 1954.
