= Kaino Lempinen =

Finnish gymnast (1921–2003)

- Full name: Kaino Johannes Lempinen
- Born: 8 February 1921 Lemu, Finland
- Died: 13 September 2003 (aged 82) Turku, Finland

Gymnastics career
- Discipline: Men's artistic gymnastics
- Country represented: Finland
Medal record
Men's artistic gymnastics
Representing Finland
Olympic Games
Bronze medal – third place	1952 Helsinki	Team

Kaino Johannes Lempinen (8 February 1921 – 13 September 2003) was a Finnish gymnast who competed in the 1952 Summer Olympics.
