= Hans Schwarzentruber =

Swiss gymnast

- Full name: Johannes Schwarzentruber
- Born: 25 March 1929 Lucerne, Switzerland
- Died: 23 November 1982 (aged 53) Lucerne, Switzerland
- Height: 1.65 m (5 ft 5 in)

Gymnastics career
- Discipline: Men's artistic gymnastics
- Country represented: Switzerland
- Club: Bürgerturnverein Luzern
Medal record
Men's artistic gymnastics
Representing Switzerland
Olympic Games
Silver medal – second place	1952 Helsinki	Team

Johannes Schwarzentruber (25 March 1929 – 23 November 1982) was a Swiss gymnast who competed in the 1952 Summer Olympics and in the 1960 Summer Olympics.
