= Gymnastics at the 1952 Summer Olympics =

Gymnastics at the Games of the XV Olympiad
- Venue: Messuhalli
- Dates: 19–24 July 1952

Gymnastics at the 1952 Summer Olympics was represented by 15 events: 7 for women and 8 for men. All events were held between 19 and 24 July in the Messuhalli building in Helsinki. Men's events were held in Exhibition Hall I while women's events were contested in the smaller Exhibition Hall II.

== Medal summary ==
=== Men's events ===
Games	Gold	Silver	Bronze
Individual all-around	Viktor Chukarin; Soviet Union	Hrant Shahinyan; Soviet Union	Josef Stalder; Switzerland
Team all-around	Soviet Union; Vladimir Belyakov; Iosif Berdiev; Viktor Chukarin; Yevgeny Korolkov; Dmytro Leonkin; Valentin Muratov; Mikhail Perelman; Hrant Shahinyan	Switzerland; Hans Eugster; Ernst Fivian; Ernst Gebendinger; Jack Günthard; Hans Schwarzentruber; Josef Stalder; Melchior Thalmann; Jean Tschabold	Finland; Paavo Aaltonen; Kalevi Laitinen; Onni Lappalainen; Kaino Lempinen; Berndt Lindfors; Olavi Rove; Heikki Savolainen; Kalevi Viskari
Floor exercise	William Thoresson; Sweden	Jerzy Jokiel; Poland Tadao Uesako; Japan	none awarded
Horizontal bar	Jack Günthard; Switzerland	Josef Stalder; Switzerland; Alfred Schwarzmann; Germany	none awarded
Parallel bars	Hans Eugster; Switzerland	Viktor Chukarin; Soviet Union	Josef Stalder; Switzerland
Pommel horse	Viktor Chukarin; Soviet Union	Hrant Shahinyan; Soviet Union; Yevgeny Korolkov; Soviet Union	none awarded
Rings	Hrant Shahinyan; Soviet Union	Viktor Chukarin; Soviet Union	Dmytro Leonkin; Soviet Union Hans Eugster; Switzerland
Vault	Viktor Chukarin; Soviet Union	Masao Takemoto; Japan	Takashi Ono; Japan Tadao Uesako; Japan

=== Women's events ===
Games	Gold	Silver	Bronze
Individual all-around	Maria Gorokhovskaya; Soviet Union	Nina Bocharova; Soviet Union	Margit Korondi; Hungary
Team all-around	Soviet Union; Nina Bocharova; Pelageya Danilova; Maria Gorokhovskaya; Ekaterina Kalinchuk; Galina Minaicheva; Galina Shamrai; Galina Urbanovich; Medea Jugeli	Hungary; Andrea Bodó; Irén Daruházi-Karcsics; Erzsébet Gulyás-Köteles; Ágnes Keleti; Margit Korondi; Edit Perényi-Weckinger; Olga Tass; Mária Kövi-Zalai	Czechoslovakia; Hana Bobková; Alena Chadimová; Jana Rabasová; Alena Reichová; Matylda Šínová; Božena Srncová; Věra Vančurová; Eva Věchtová
Balance beam	Nina Bocharova; Soviet Union	Maria Gorokhovskaya; Soviet Union	Margit Korondi; Hungary
Floor exercise	Ágnes Keleti; Hungary	Maria Gorokhovskaya; Soviet Union	Margit Korondi; Hungary
Uneven bars	Margit Korondi; Hungary	Maria Gorokhovskaya; Soviet Union	Ágnes Keleti; Hungary
Vault	Ekaterina Kalinchuk; Soviet Union	Maria Gorokhovskaya; Soviet Union	Galina Minaicheva; Soviet Union
Team, portable apparatus	Sweden; Karin Lindberg; Ann-Sofi Pettersson; Evy Berggren; Gun Röring; Göta Pettersson; Ingrid Sandahl; Hjördis Nordin; Vanja Blomberg	Soviet Union; Maria Gorokhovskaya; Nina Bocharova; Galina Minaicheva; Galina Urbanovich; Pelageya Danilova; Galina Shamrai; Medea Jugeli; Ekaterina Kalinchuk	Hungary; Margit Korondi; Ágnes Keleti; Edit Perényi-Weckinger; Olga Tass; Erzsébet Gulyás-Köteles; Mária Kövi-Zalai; Andrea Bodó; Irén Daruházi-Karcsics

== Medal table ==
Rank	Nation	Gold	Silver	Bronze	Total
1	Soviet Union	9	11	2	22
2	Switzerland	2	2	3	7
3	Hungary	2	1	5	8
4	Sweden	2	0	0	2
5	Japan	0	2	2	4
6	Germany	0	1	0	1
6	Poland	0	1	0	1
8	Czechoslovakia	0	0	1	1
8	Finland	0	0	1	1
Totals (9 entries)		15	18	14	47

== Participating nations ==
- Argentina (2)
- Austria (16)
- Belgium (3)
- Bulgaria (16)
- Cuba (3)
- Czechoslovakia (16)
- Denmark (7)
- Egypt (8)
- Finland (16)
- France (16)
- Germany (16)
- Great Britain (14)
- Hungary (16)
- India (2)
- Italy (16)
- Japan (5)
- Luxembourg (6)
- Netherlands (8)
- Norway (11)
- Poland (16)
- Portugal (9)
- Romania (16)
- Saar (6)
- South Africa (3)
- Soviet Union (16)
- Spain (1)
- Sweden (15)
- Switzerland (8)
- United States (16)
- Yugoslavia (16)

== See also ==
- 1952 Summer Olympics

== Sources ==
- The Official Report of the Organizing Committee for the Games of the XV Olympiad. Porvoo: Werner Södreström Osakeyhtiö. 1955. Archived from the original on 12 June 2007.
