= Gymnastics at the 1952 Summer Olympics – Men's floor =

Olympic gymnastics event

Men's floor exercise at the Games of the XV Olympiad
- Venue: Messuhalli, Exhibition Hall I
- Date: 19–21 July 1952
- Competitors: 185 from 29 nations
- Winning score: 19.25

Medalists
1st place, gold medalist(s)		William Thoresson	Sweden
2nd place, silver medalist(s)		Tadao Uesako	Japan
2nd place, silver medalist(s)		Jerzy Jokiel	Poland

The men's floor exercise competition at the 1952 Summer Olympics was held at Messuhalli, Exhibition Hall I from 19 to 21 July. It was the fourth appearance of the event.

== Competition format ==
The gymnastics format continued to use the aggregation format. Each nation entered a team of between five and eight gymnasts or up to three individual gymnasts. All entrants in the gymnastics competitions performed both a compulsory exercise and a voluntary exercise for each apparatus. The 2 exercise scores were summed to give a total for the apparatus.

No separate finals were contested.

For each exercise, four judges gave scores from 0 to 10 in one-tenth point increments. The top and bottom scores were discarded and the remaining two scores averaged to give the exercise total. Thus, exercise scores ranged from 0 to 10 and apparatus scores from 0 to 20.

Only one attempt could be made in each of the two floor exercises.

== Results ==
Rank	Gymnast	Nation	Compulsory	Voluntary	Total
1st place, gold medalist(s)	William Thoresson	Sweden	9.45	9.80	19.25
2nd place, silver medalist(s)	Tadao Uesako	Japan	9.55	9.60	19.15
2nd place, silver medalist(s)	Jerzy Jokiel	Poland	9.55	9.60	19.15
4	Takashi Ono	Japan	9.40	9.65	19.05
5	Onni Lappalainen	Finland	9.30	9.70	19.00
6	Kalevi Laitinen	Finland	9.45	9.50	18.95
6	Anders Lindh	Sweden	9.35	9.60	18.95
8	Ferdinand Daniš	Czechoslovakia	9.40	9.50	18.90
8	Hrant Shahinyan	Soviet Union	9.30	9.60	18.90
8	Bob Stout	United States	9.10	9.80	18.90
11	René Changeat	France	9.20	9.65	18.85
11	Valentin Muratov	Soviet Union	9.35	9.50	18.85
11	Masao Takemoto	Japan	9.20	9.65	18.85
14	Vladimir Belyakov	Soviet Union	9.25	9.50	18.75
14	Kaino Lempinen	Finland	9.25	9.50	18.75
14	Tetsumi Nabeya	Japan	9.30	9.45	18.75
14	Ferenc Pataki	Hungary	9.15	9.60	18.75
18	Lajos Sántha	Hungary	9.30	9.40	18.70
19	Iosif Berdiev	Soviet Union	9.25	9.40	18.65
19	Guido Figone	Italy	9.25	9.40	18.65
19	Josef Stalder	Switzerland	9.15	9.50	18.65
22	Berndt Lindfors	Finland	9.10	9.50	18.60
22	Mincho Todorov	Bulgaria	9.30	9.30	18.60
24	Paavo Aaltonen	Finland	9.10	9.45	18.55
24	Akitomo Kaneko	Japan	9.30	9.25	18.55
24	Jindřich Mikulec	Czechoslovakia	9.20	9.35	18.55
27	József Fekete	Hungary	9.20	9.30	18.50
27	Dmytro Leonkin	Soviet Union	8.95	9.55	18.50
29	Joaquín Blume	Spain	9.20	9.25	18.45
29	Viktor Chukarin	Soviet Union	8.65	9.80	18.45
29	Sándor Réthy	Hungary	9.20	9.25	18.45
32	Adalbert Dickhut	Germany	8.90	9.50	18.40
32	Josef Svoboda	Czechoslovakia	9.10	9.30	18.40
34	Zdeněk Růžička	Czechoslovakia	9.00	9.35	18.35
35	Yevgeny Korolkov	Soviet Union	9.00	9.30	18.30
35	Jerzy Solarz	Poland	9.45	8.85	18.30
37	Vladimír Kejř	Czechoslovakia	8.95	9.30	18.25
38	Helmut Bantz	Germany	8.95	9.25	18.20
38	Arrigo Carnoli	Italy	8.90	9.30	18.20
38	Károly Kocsis	Hungary	9.00	9.20	18.20
41	Ernst Fivian	Switzerland	8.60	9.55	18.15
41	Georg Johansen	Norway	8.90	9.25	18.15
41	Mikhail Perelman	Soviet Union	8.70	9.45	18.15
41	Jean Tschabold	Switzerland	8.95	9.20	18.15
45	Arne Carlsson	Sweden	8.75	9.35	18.10
45	Juan Caviglia	Argentina	8.80	9.30	18.10
47	Ernst Gebendinger	Switzerland	8.75	9.30	18.05
47	Leo Sotorník	Czechoslovakia	8.80	9.25	18.05
47	Todor Todorov	Bulgaria	9.30	8.75	18.05
47	Ernst Wister	Austria	8.70	9.35	18.05
51	Arne Knudsen	Norway	8.90	9.10	18.00
51	Kurt Wigartz	Sweden	8.80	9.20	18.00
53	János Mogyorósi-Klencs	Hungary	8.55	9.40	17.95
53	Bill Roetzheim	United States	8.85	9.10	17.95
55	Carol Bedö	Romania	8.85	9.05	17.90
55	Poul Jessen	Denmark	8.85	9.05	17.90
55	Szymon Sobala	Poland	9.10	8.80	17.90
55	Iliya Topalov	Bulgaria	9.10	8.80	17.90
59	Ed Scrobe	United States	8.80	9.05	17.85
59	Josef Škvor	Czechoslovakia	8.90	8.95	17.85
59	Josy Stoffel	Luxembourg	8.95	8.90	17.85
62	Mathias Jamtvedt	Norway	8.75	9.05	17.80
63	Olavi Rove	Finland	8.30	9.45	17.75
63	Littorio Sampieri	Italy	8.80	8.95	17.75
63	Lajos Tóth	Hungary	8.60	9.15	17.75
66	Hans Eugster	Switzerland	8.40	9.30	17.70
66	Andrei Kerekes	Romania	8.75	8.95	17.70
66	Paweł Świętek	Poland	8.85	8.85	17.70
69	Alf Olsen	Norway	8.50	9.15	17.65
69	Börje Stattin	Sweden	8.30	9.35	17.65
71	Hans Pfann	Germany	8.50	9.10	17.60
71	Hans Sauter	Austria	8.60	9.00	17.60
73	Raymond Dot	France	8.10	9.45	17.55
73	Freddy Jensen	Denmark	8.40	9.15	17.55
73	Michel Mathiot	France	8.40	9.15	17.55
73	Theo Wied	Germany	8.50	9.05	17.55
73	Luigi Zanetti	Italy	8.40	9.15	17.55
78	Frederik De Waele	Belgium	8.75	8.75	17.50
78	Alfred Schwarzmann	Germany	8.60	8.90	17.50
78	Kalevi Viskari	Finland	8.05	9.45	17.50
78	Ali Zaky	Egypt	8.25	9.25	17.50
82	Ede Mađar	Yugoslavia	8.85	8.60	17.45
82	Volmer Thomsen	Denmark	8.60	8.85	17.45
84	Jack Beckner	United States	8.15	9.25	17.40
84	Miloš Kolejka	Czechoslovakia	8.15	9.25	17.40
84	Odd Lie	Norway	8.45	8.95	17.40
84	Hans Schwarzentruber	Switzerland	8.30	9.10	17.40
88	Vasil Konstantinov	Bulgaria	8.30	9.05	17.35
89	Paweł Gaca	Poland	8.75	8.55	17.30
89	Ryszard Kucjas	Poland	8.75	8.55	17.30
89	Nils Sjöberg	Sweden	8.25	9.05	17.30
92	Erich Wied	Germany	8.35	8.90	17.25
92	Dimitar Yordanov	Bulgaria	8.60	8.65	17.25
94	Vincent D'Autorio	United States	8.00	9.20	17.20
94	Frederic Orendi	Romania	8.75	8.45	17.20
96	Francisco Cascante	Cuba	8.65	8.50	17.15
96	Jack Günthard	Switzerland	7.95	9.20	17.15
98	Jean Guillou	France	8.40	8.70	17.10
98	Mahmoud Safwat	Egypt	8.35	8.75	17.10
98	André Weingand	France	8.20	8.90	17.10
101	Magdy Gheriani	Egypt	8.45	8.60	17.05
101	Heikki Savolainen	Finland	7.60	9.45	17.05
103	Ferenc Kemény	Hungary	8.10	8.90	17.00
103	Melchior Thalmann	Switzerland	8.00	9.00	17.00
105	Zdzisław Lesiński	Poland	8.20	8.70	16.90
105	Mahmoud Mohamed Reda	Egypt	8.40	8.50	16.90
107	Børge Nielsen	Denmark	8.05	8.80	16.85
108	Ángel Aguiar	Cuba	8.70	8.10	16.80
108	Ivan Čaklec	Yugoslavia	8.20	8.60	16.80
108	Francisc Cocis	Romania	8.20	8.60	16.80
108	Ernst Madland	Norway	8.05	8.75	16.80
112	Wolfgang Girardi	Austria	8.15	8.60	16.75
112	Nikolay Milev	Bulgaria	8.60	8.15	16.75
112	Børge Minerth	Denmark	8.15	8.60	16.75
112	Orlando Polmonari	Italy	8.40	8.35	16.75
116	Hubert Erang	Luxembourg	8.15	8.55	16.70
117	Jeroom Riske	Belgium	8.30	8.35	16.65
117	Charles Simms	United States	7.80	8.85	16.65
119	Dušan Furlan	Yugoslavia	8.55	8.05	16.60
119	Paweł Gawron	Poland	8.50	8.10	16.60
121	Friedel Overwien	Germany	7.70	8.80	16.50
122	Ahmed Issam Allam	Egypt	7.80	8.65	16.45
122	Eugen Balint	Romania	8.15	8.30	16.45
122	Mihai Botez	Romania	7.80	8.65	16.45
125	Willi Welt	Austria	8.35	8.05	16.40
126	Manuel Gouveia	Portugal	7.40	8.95	16.35
126	Paul Grubenthal	Austria	7.25	9.10	16.35
126	Heinz Ostheimer	Saar	7.85	8.50	16.35
129	Walter Blattmann	United States	7.80	8.50	16.30
129	Raúl Caldeira	Portugal	7.65	8.65	16.30
129	Maurice De Groote	Belgium	8.40	7.90	16.30
132	Marcel de Wolf	France	8.30	7.95	16.25
132	Alf Nørgaard	Norway	7.90	8.35	16.25
134	Fabio Bonacina	Italy	7.90	8.30	16.20
134	Friedrich Fetz	Austria	8.20	8.00	16.20
134	Don Holder	United States	8.00	8.20	16.20
137	Marcel Coppin	Luxembourg	8.20	7.95	16.15
137	Armand Huberty	Luxembourg	8.30	7.85	16.15
137	Fred Wiedersporn	Saar	8.35	7.80	16.15
140	Magne Kleiven	Norway	7.80	8.30	16.10
141	Zoltan Balogh	Romania	7.80	8.20	16.00
141	Bjarne Jørgensen	Denmark	7.60	8.40	16.00
143	Ahmed Khalil El-Giddawi	Egypt	8.25	7.70	15.95
144	Georges Floquet	France	7.70	8.20	15.90
144	Rolf Lauer	Saar	7.55	8.35	15.90
146	Sreten Stefanović	Yugoslavia	8.30	7.50	15.80
147	Rafael Lecuona	Cuba	7.55	8.15	15.70
148	Raymond Badin	France	6.90	8.75	15.65
148	Franjo Jurjević	Yugoslavia	7.40	8.25	15.65
148	Frank Turner	Great Britain	7.75	7.90	15.65
151	António Leite	Portugal	7.80	7.70	15.50
151	Jack Whitford	Great Britain	8.25	7.25	15.50
153	Joaquim Granger	Portugal	7.35	8.10	15.45
154	Nikolay Atanasov	Bulgaria	7.00	8.25	15.25
154	Arthur Schmitt	Saar	7.15	8.10	15.25
154	Quinto Vadi	Italy	7.40	7.85	15.25
157	Aurel Losnita	Romania	7.00	8.20	15.20
157	René Schroeder	Luxembourg	7.90	7.30	15.20
159	Manuel Cardoso	Portugal	7.10	8.00	15.10
159	Gunnar Pedersen	Denmark	7.00	8.10	15.10
161	César Bonoris	Argentina	7.00	7.90	14.90
161	Graham Harcourt	Great Britain	7.90	7.00	14.90
161	Franz Kemter	Austria	7.00	7.90	14.90
164	Ronnie Lombard	South Africa	7.80	7.00	14.80
164	Walter Müller	Saar	7.05	7.75	14.80
166	Manuel Prazeres	Portugal	6.90	7.85	14.75
166	Jack Wells	South Africa	7.70	7.05	14.75
168	Mohamed Sayed Hamdi	Egypt	7.20	7.25	14.45
169	Ken Buffin	Great Britain	7.20	7.20	14.40
170	Jey Kugeler	Luxembourg	7.30	6.90	14.20
170	George Weedon	Great Britain	6.70	7.50	14.20
172	Ivica Jelić	Yugoslavia	6.30	7.70	14.00
173	Norbert Dietrich	Saar	6.00	7.85	13.85
174	Silvio Brivio	Italy	6.20	7.30	13.50
174	Peter Starling	Great Britain	6.50	7.00	13.50
176	Ragai Youssef	Egypt	5.50	7.75	13.25
177	Rolf Yelseth	South Africa	5.50	6.75	12.25
178	Vir Singh	India	4.50	4.50	9.00
179	Stoyan Stoyanov	Bulgaria	8.95	–	8.95
180	Jakob Kiefer	Germany	8.75	–	8.75
181	Karel Janež	Yugoslavia	–	7.75	7.75
182	Antun Kropivšek	Yugoslavia	7.30	–	7.30
183	Erich Peters	Sweden	6.80	0.00	6.80
184	Khushi Ram	India	3.00	3.50	6.50
185	Hans Friedrich	Austria	6.10	–	6.10
