= Gymnastics at the 1952 Summer Olympics – Men's parallel bars =

Olympic gymnastics event

Men's parallel bars at the Games of the XV Olympiad
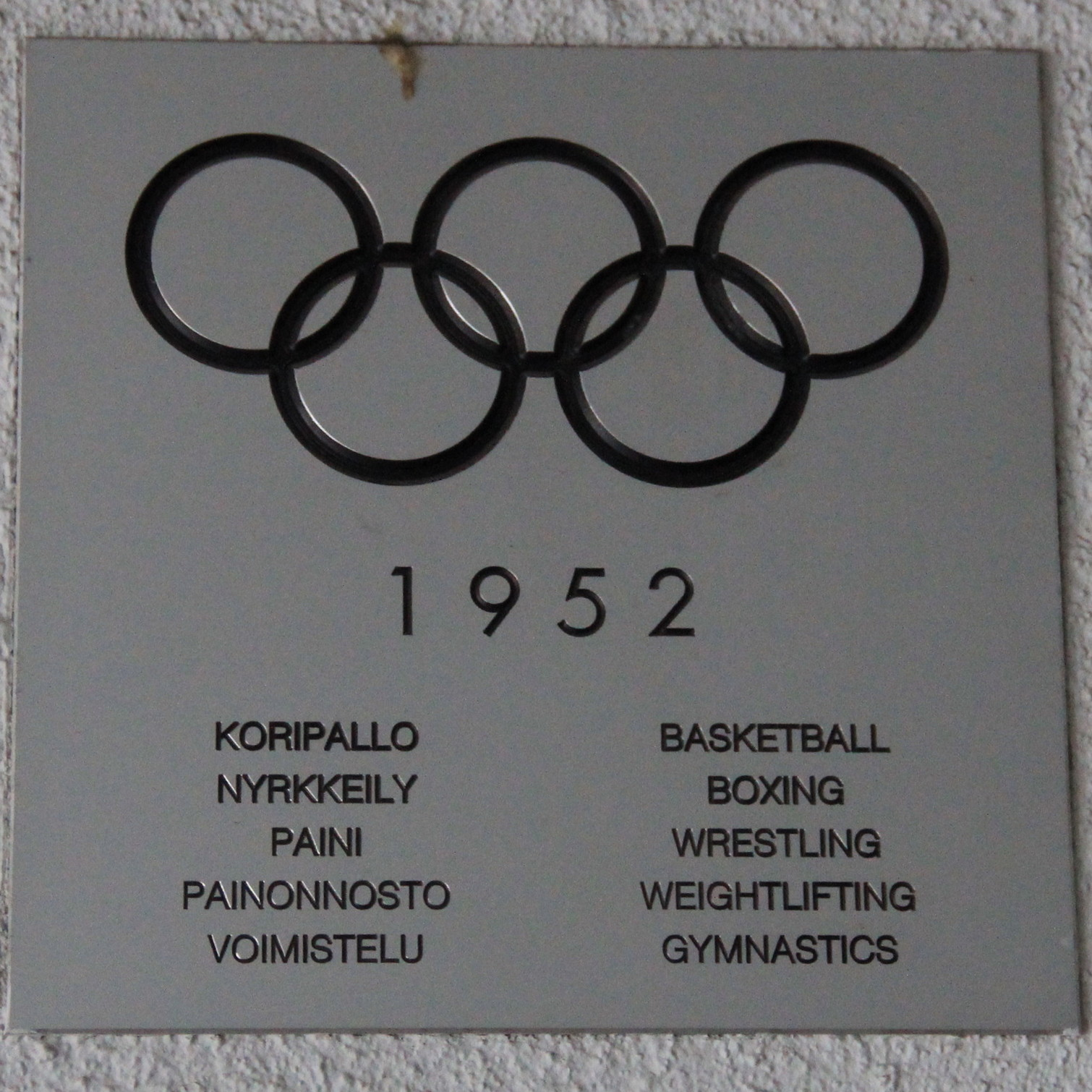
- Plaque at Töölö Sports Hall commemorating 1952 Olympic sports held there
- Venue: Töölö Sports Hall, Exhibition Hall I
- Dates: 19–21 July 1952
- Competitors: 185 from 29 nations
- Winning score: 19.65

Medalists
1st place, gold medalist(s)		Hans Eugster; Switzerland
2nd place, silver medalist(s)		Viktor Chukarin; Soviet Union
3rd place, bronze medalist(s)		Josef Stalder; Switzerland

The men's parallel bars competition at the 1952 Summer Olympics was held at Messuhalli, Exhibition Hall I from 19 to 21 July. It was the eighth appearance of the event. There were 185 competitors from 29 nations, with each nation sending up to 8 gymnasts. The event was won by Hans Eugster of Switzerland, the nation's second consecutive and third overall victory in the parallel bars, breaking a tie with Germany for most all-time. Switzerland also took bronze, as Josef Stalder repeated his 1948 third-place performance (making him the second man to win multiple medals in the event, after fellow Swiss Michael Reusch). The Soviet Union's debut resulted in a silver medal for Viktor Chukarin, who would become the third multi-medalist in 1956.

== Background ==
This was the eighth appearance of the event, which is one of the five apparatus events held every time there were apparatus events at the Summer Olympics (no apparatus events were held in 1900, 1908, 1912, or 1920). Six of the top 10 gymnasts from 1948 returned: bronze medalist Josef Stalder of Switzerland, sixth-place finisher Heikki Savolainen of Finland, seventh-place finishers Paavo Aaltonen of Finland and Zdeněk Růžička of Czechoslovakia, ninth-place finisher Lajos Sántha of Hungary, and tenth-place finisher Olavi Rove of Finland. Swiss gymnast Hans Eugster was the reigning (1950) world champion, with Rove the runner-up.

Belgium, India, Norway, Poland, Portugal, Saar, South Africa, the Soviet Union, Spain, and Sweden each made their debut in the men's parallel bars. The United States made its seventh appearance, most of any nation, having missed only the inaugural 1896 Games. Of the 22 different nations that had competed at least once in the event before 1952, 19 competed in Helsinki (only Greece, Mexico, and the Netherlands were missing among the nations having previously competed).

== Competition format ==
The gymnastics format continued to use the aggregation format. Each nation entered a team of between five and eight gymnasts or up to three individual gymnasts. All entrants in the gymnastics competitions performed both a compulsory exercise and a voluntary exercise for each apparatus. The 2 exercise scores were summed to give a total for the apparatus.

No separate finals were contested.

For each exercise, four judges gave scores from 0 to 10 in one-tenth point increments. The top and bottom scores were discarded and the remaining two scores averaged to give the exercise total. Thus, exercise scores ranged from 0 to 10 and apparatus scores from 0 to 20.

The competitor had the option to make a second try only on the compulsory exercise—with the second attempt counting regardless of whether it was better than the first.

== Schedule ==
All times are Eastern European Summer Time (UTC+3)

Date	Time	Round
Saturday, 19 July 1952; Sunday, 20 July 1952; Monday, 21 July 1952	7:30; 8:00; 8:00	Final

== Results ==
Rank	Gymnast	Nation	Compulsory	Voluntary	Total
1st place, gold medalist(s)	Hans Eugster	Switzerland	9.85	9.80	19.65
2nd place, silver medalist(s)	Viktor Chukarin	Soviet Union	9.80	9.80	19.60
3rd place, bronze medalist(s)	Josef Stalder	Switzerland	9.80	9.70	19.50
4	Hrant Shahinyan	Soviet Union	9.50	9.85	19.35
5	Ferdinand Daniš	Czechoslovakia	9.70	9.60	19.30
5	Yevgeny Korolkov	Soviet Union	9.50	9.80	19.30
5	Jean Tschabold	Switzerland	9.65	9.65	19.30
8	Vladimir Belyakov	Soviet Union	9.45	9.80	19.25
8	Valentin Muratov	Soviet Union	9.55	9.70	19.25
10	Akitomo Kaneko	Japan	9.50	9.70	19.20
11	Iosif Berdiev	Soviet Union	9.45	9.70	19.15
12	Helmut Bantz	Germany	9.60	9.50	19.10
13	Jack Günthard	Switzerland	9.55	9.50	19.05
13	Onni Lappalainen	Finland	9.45	9.60	19.05
15	Mikhail Perelman	Soviet Union	9.25	9.75	19.00
15	Alfred Schwarzmann	Germany	9.55	9.45	19.00
15	Theo Wied	Germany	9.45	9.55	19.00
18	Hans Schwarzentruber	Switzerland	9.55	9.40	18.95
19	Adalbert Dickhut	Germany	9.40	9.45	18.85
19	Olavi Rove	Finland	9.40	9.45	18.85
21	Ed Scrobe	United States	9.35	9.45	18.80
21	Ali Zaky	Egypt	9.40	9.40	18.80
23	Hans Pfann	Germany	9.45	9.30	18.75
23	Hans Sauter	Austria	9.40	9.35	18.75
23	Melchior Thalmann	Switzerland	9.40	9.35	18.75
26	Josy Stoffel	Luxembourg	9.40	9.30	18.70
27	Paavo Aaltonen	Finland	9.00	9.65	18.65
27	Jakob Kiefer	Germany	9.45	9.20	18.65
27	Jindřich Mikulec	Czechoslovakia	9.35	9.30	18.65
27	Erich Wied	Germany	9.30	9.35	18.65
31	Tetsumi Nabeya	Japan	9.40	9.20	18.60
31	Takashi Ono	Japan	9.45	9.15	18.60
31	Lajos Sántha	Hungary	9.45	9.15	18.60
31	Josef Škvor	Czechoslovakia	9.20	9.40	18.60
35	Guido Figone	Italy	9.20	9.35	18.55
35	Michel Mathiot	France	9.35	9.20	18.55
35	Bob Stout	United States	9.30	9.25	18.55
38	Ernst Gebendinger	Switzerland	9.65	8.85	18.50
38	Tadao Uesako	Japan	9.20	9.30	18.50
40	Friedel Overwien	Germany	9.35	9.10	18.45
40	Ferenc Pataki	Hungary	9.40	9.05	18.45
40	Kalevi Viskari	Finland	9.45	9.00	18.45
40	Willi Welt	Austria	9.35	9.10	18.45
44	Raymond Dot	France	9.30	9.10	18.40
44	Josef Svoboda	Czechoslovakia	9.25	9.15	18.40
44	Lajos Tóth	Hungary	9.30	9.10	18.40
47	Littorio Sampieri	Italy	9.00	9.35	18.35
47	Börje Stattin	Sweden	9.30	9.05	18.35
49	Ernst Fivian	Switzerland	8.70	9.60	18.30
49	Wolfgang Girardi	Austria	9.15	9.15	18.30
49	Jean Guillou	France	9.35	8.95	18.30
52	Kalevi Laitinen	Finland	9.10	9.15	18.25
52	Ernst Wister	Austria	9.05	9.20	18.25
54	Hans Friedrich	Austria	9.25	8.95	18.20
54	Heikki Savolainen	Finland	9.00	9.20	18.20
54	Todor Todorov	Bulgaria	9.00	9.20	18.20
57	Alf Olsen	Norway	9.10	9.05	18.15
57	Szymon Sobala	Poland	9.20	8.95	18.15
57	William Thoresson	Sweden	9.15	9.00	18.15
60	Raymond Badin	France	9.20	8.90	18.10
60	Joaquín Blume	Spain	9.00	9.10	18.10
60	Bill Roetzheim	United States	9.15	8.95	18.10
60	Leo Sotorník	Czechoslovakia	9.35	8.75	18.10
60	André Weingand	France	9.20	8.90	18.10
65	Kaino Lempinen	Finland	9.35	8.70	18.05
65	Dimitar Yordanov	Bulgaria	8.90	9.15	18.05
67	Ahmed Issam Allam	Egypt	9.10	8.90	18.00
67	Arne Carlsson	Sweden	9.00	9.00	18.00
67	Anders Lindh	Sweden	9.00	9.00	18.00
67	Frederic Orendi	Romania	9.05	8.95	18.00
71	Zdeněk Růžička	Czechoslovakia	9.05	8.90	17.95
71	Masao Takemoto	Japan	9.10	8.85	17.95
71	Mincho Todorov	Bulgaria	9.00	8.95	17.95
74	Vincent D'Autorio	United States	9.00	8.90	17.90
74	Paweł Gaca	Poland	8.90	9.00	17.90
74	Franz Kemter	Austria	9.20	8.70	17.90
74	Miloš Kolejka	Czechoslovakia	9.20	8.70	17.90
74	Vasil Konstantinov	Bulgaria	8.95	8.95	17.90
74	Nikolay Milev	Bulgaria	9.15	8.75	17.90
74	Erich Peters	Sweden	8.90	9.00	17.90
81	Jack Beckner	United States	8.85	9.00	17.85
81	Mihai Botez	Romania	8.90	8.95	17.85
81	René Changeat	France	8.90	8.95	17.85
81	József Fekete	Hungary	9.15	8.70	17.85
81	Paweł Gawron	Poland	8.85	9.00	17.85
86	Károly Kocsis	Hungary	9.30	8.50	17.80
87	Magdy Gheriani	Egypt	8.90	8.85	17.75
87	Vladimír Kejř	Czechoslovakia	9.20	8.55	17.75
87	Ferenc Kemény	Hungary	8.75	9.00	17.75
87	Berndt Lindfors	Finland	9.05	8.70	17.75
87	Paweł Świętek	Poland	8.80	8.95	17.75
87	Frank Turner	Great Britain	9.10	8.65	17.75
87	Luigi Zanetti	Italy	9.00	8.75	17.75
94	Fabio Bonacina	Italy	9.00	8.70	17.70
94	Armand Huberty	Luxembourg	8.90	8.80	17.70
96	Silvio Brivio	Italy	8.75	8.90	17.65
96	Mathias Jamtvedt	Norway	8.85	8.80	17.65
96	Jey Kugeler	Luxembourg	8.85	8.80	17.65
96	Jack Whitford	Great Britain	9.10	8.55	17.65
100	Walter Blattmann	United States	9.10	8.50	17.60
100	Dušan Furlan	Yugoslavia	9.00	8.60	17.60
100	Paul Grubenthal	Austria	9.10	8.50	17.60
100	János Mogyorósi-Klencs	Hungary	9.10	8.50	17.60
100	Orlando Polmonari	Italy	8.90	8.70	17.60
100	Nils Sjöberg	Sweden	8.85	8.75	17.60
106	Arthur Schmitt	Saar	8.95	8.60	17.55
107	Georges Floquet	France	9.15	8.30	17.45
107	Jerzy Solarz	Poland	8.80	8.65	17.45
107	Quinto Vadi	Italy	8.50	8.95	17.45
110	Sándor Réthy	Hungary	8.60	8.80	17.40
111	Georg Johansen	Norway	8.65	8.60	17.25
111	Alf Nørgaard	Norway	8.80	8.45	17.25
111	Volmer Thomsen	Denmark	9.00	8.25	17.25
111	Kurt Wigartz	Sweden	8.95	8.30	17.25
115	Ryszard Kucjas	Poland	8.40	8.80	17.20
116	Jerzy Jokiel	Poland	8.50	8.60	17.10
116	Børge Nielsen	Denmark	8.70	8.40	17.10
118	Ivan Čaklec	Yugoslavia	8.65	8.40	17.05
118	Don Holder	United States	9.05	8.00	17.05
120	Franjo Jurjević	Yugoslavia	9.00	8.00	17.00
121	Nikolay Atanasov	Bulgaria	8.65	8.30	16.95
121	Sreten Stefanović	Yugoslavia	8.55	8.40	16.95
123	Antun Kropivšek	Yugoslavia	8.65	8.25	16.90
124	Bjarne Jørgensen	Denmark	8.85	7.95	16.80
124	Arne Knudsen	Norway	9.10	7.70	16.80
126	Ernst Madland	Norway	8.75	8.00	16.75
127	Dmytro Leonkin	Soviet Union	7.10	9.60	16.70
128	Poul Jessen	Denmark	8.85	7.80	16.65
128	Odd Lie	Norway	8.60	8.05	16.65
130	César Bonoris	Argentina	8.75	7.85	16.60
130	Andrei Kerekes	Romania	8.95	7.65	16.60
132	Ivica Jelić	Yugoslavia	8.40	8.15	16.55
133	Karel Janež	Yugoslavia	7.85	8.60	16.45
133	Freddy Jensen	Denmark	7.55	8.90	16.45
133	Ragai Youssef	Egypt	8.55	7.90	16.45
136	Ahmed Khalil El-Giddawi	Egypt	8.20	8.20	16.40
136	Ede Mađar	Yugoslavia	8.05	8.35	16.40
138	Ken Buffin	Great Britain	8.85	7.50	16.35
139	Joaquim Granger	Portugal	8.45	7.80	16.25
140	Walter Müller	Saar	8.40	7.80	16.20
141	Frederik De Waele	Belgium	7.85	8.25	16.10
142	Marcel Coppin	Luxembourg	8.65	7.40	16.05
142	Charles Simms	United States	7.25	8.80	16.05
144	Rafael Lecuona	Cuba	8.90	7.10	16.00
145	Eugen Balint	Romania	7.55	8.40	15.95
145	Graham Harcourt	Great Britain	8.70	7.25	15.95
147	Norbert Dietrich	Saar	8.20	7.65	15.85
147	Hubert Erang	Luxembourg	8.40	7.45	15.85
149	Zoltan Balogh	Romania	7.90	7.90	15.80
149	Arrigo Carnoli	Italy	7.50	8.30	15.80
149	Mahmoud Safwat	Egypt	8.45	7.35	15.80
152	Iliya Topalov	Bulgaria	9.25	6.50	15.75
153	Magne Kleiven	Norway	7.90	7.70	15.60
154	Aurel Losnita	Romania	7.00	8.50	15.50
155	Ángel Aguiar	Cuba	7.45	8.00	15.45
155	René Schroeder	Luxembourg	7.90	7.55	15.45
157	Rolf Lauer	Saar	7.70	7.70	15.40
158	Carol Bedö	Romania	7.70	7.55	15.25
158	Gunnar Pedersen	Denmark	8.75	6.50	15.25
158	Jeroom Riske	Belgium	8.10	7.15	15.25
161	Rolf Yelseth	South Africa	7.70	7.50	15.20
162	Marcel de Wolf	France	8.10	7.00	15.10
163	Ronnie Lombard	South Africa	8.05	7.00	15.05
164	Manuel Gouveia	Portugal	6.70	8.25	14.95
165	Zdzisław Lesiński	Poland	6.00	8.85	14.85
166	Juan Caviglia	Argentina	7.90	6.75	14.65
167	Heinz Ostheimer	Saar	6.70	7.90	14.60
168	Francisc Cocis	Romania	6.25	8.20	14.45
169	Francisco Cascante	Cuba	8.30	6.00	14.30
170	George Weedon	Great Britain	6.15	7.75	13.90
171	Mohamed Sayed Hamdi	Egypt	8.65	5.00	13.65
172	Peter Starling	Great Britain	7.05	6.50	13.55
173	Raúl Caldeira	Portugal	6.95	6.30	13.25
173	Jack Wells	South Africa	8.25	5.00	13.25
175	Manuel Prazeres	Portugal	6.25	6.90	13.15
176	Fred Wiedersporn	Saar	6.60	6.30	12.90
177	António Leite	Portugal	7.00	5.75	12.75
178	Børge Minerth	Denmark	7.10	5.45	12.55
179	Manuel Cardoso	Portugal	5.00	5.00	10.00
180	Mahmoud Mohamed Reda	Egypt	6.50	3.00	9.50
181	Stoyan Stoyanov	Bulgaria	9.15	–	9.15
182	Friedrich Fetz	Austria	8.40	–	8.40
183	Maurice De Groote	Belgium	0.00	8.10	8.10
184	Vir Singh	India	2.25	4.00	6.25
185	Khushi Ram	India	0.00	4.00	4.00
