= Gymnastics at the 1952 Summer Olympics – Men's artistic individual all-around =

Olympic gymnastics event

Men's artistic individual all-around at the Games of the XV Olympiad
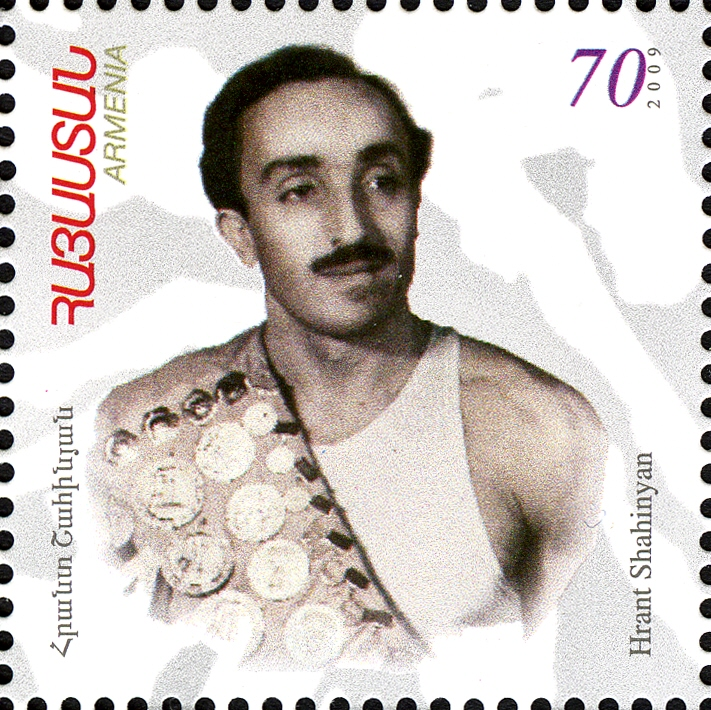
- Armenian stamp depicting silver medalist Hrant Shahinyan
- Venue: Messuhalli, Exhibition Hall I
- Dates: 19–21 July 1952
- Competitors: 185 from 29 nations
- Winning score: 115.70

Medalists
1st place, gold medalist(s)		Viktor Chukarin; Soviet Union
2nd place, silver medalist(s)		Hrant Shahinyan; Soviet Union
3rd place, bronze medalist(s)		Josef Stalder; Switzerland

The men's artistic individual all-around competition at the 1952 Summer Olympics was held at Messuhalli, Exhibition Hall I from 19 to 21 July. It was the eleventh appearance of the event. There were 185 competitors from 29 nations. Each nation entered a team of between five and eight gymnasts or up to three individual gymnasts. The event was won by Viktor Chukarin of the Soviet Union, with his countryman Hrant Shahinyan taking silver. It was the Soviet debut in the event, beginning four decades of dominance rivalled only by Japan and ending after the dissolution of the Soviet Union; the Soviets would win 6 of the 10 editions from 1952 to 1988 (and the Unified Team would sweep the medals in 1992), with Japan taking the other 4. Bronze in 1952 went to Josef Stalder of Switzerland (the nation's third consecutive Games on the podium); it was the last medal in the men's all-around for any gymnast not from the Soviet Union or Japan until 1980.

== Background ==
This was the 11th appearance of the men's individual all-around. The first individual all-around competition had been held in 1900, after the 1896 competitions featured only individual apparatus events. A men's individual all-around has been held every Games since 1900.

Seven of the top 11 gymnasts (including a tie for 10th place) from the 1948 Games returned: bronze medalist Paavo Aaltonen of Finland, fourth-place finisher Josef Stalder of Switzerland, seventh-place finisher Zdeněk Růžička of Czechoslovakia, eighth-place finisher Kalevi Laitinen of Finland, ninth-place finisher Guido Figone of Italy, and tenth-place finishers Olavi Rove of Finland and Lajos Tóth of Hungary. The 1936 gold medalist Alfred Schwarzmann (who was unable to defend his title in 1948 due to Germany not being invited to the London Games following World War II) also returned. The top two finishers at the 1950 World Championships (Switzerland's Walter Lehmann and Marcel Adatte) did not compete in Helsinki; Rove, at third place, was the highest finisher from the World Championships to compete in 1952.

India, Poland, Portugal, Saar, South Africa, the Soviet Union, Spain, and Sweden each made their debut in the event. Italy made its 10th appearance, most among nations, having missed only the 1904 Games in St. Louis.

== Competition format ==
The gymnastics format continued to use the aggregation format. All entrants in the gymnastics competitions performed both a compulsory exercise and a voluntary exercise for each apparatus. The 12 exercise scores were summed to give a total. No separate finals were contested.

For each exercise, four judges gave scores from 0 to 10 in one-tenth point increments. The top and bottom scores were discarded and the remaining two scores averaged to give the exercise total. Thus, exercise scores ranged from 0 to 10, apparatus scores from 0 to 20, and individual totals from 0 to 120.

For the vault, each competitor had two tries for each of the compulsory and voluntary vaults with the better score to count. For the other four (non-floor) apparatus exercises, the competitor had the option to make a second try only on the compulsory exercise—with the second attempt counting regardless of whether it was better than the first. For both compulsory and voluntary floor exercises, and voluntary exercises in the non-floor, non-vault apparatuses, only one attempt could be made.

== Schedule ==
All times are Eastern European Summer Time (UTC+3)

Date	Time	Round
Saturday, 19 July 1952	7:30	Final
Sunday, 20 July 1952	8:00	Final, continued
Monday, 21 July 1952	8:00	Final, continued

== Results ==
Rank	Gymnast	Nation	Exercise results																		Total
Rank	Gymnast	Nation	Floor (gymnastics)			Rings (gymnastics)			Pommel horse			Vault (gymnastics)			Parallel bars			Horizontal bar			Total
Rank	Gymnast	Nation	C	V	T	C	V	T	C	V	T	C	V	T	C	V	T	C	V	T	Total
1st place, gold medalist(s)	Viktor Chukarin	Soviet Union	8.65	9.80	18.45	9.65	9.90	19.55	9.70	9.80	19.50	9.45	9.75	19.20	9.80	9.80	19.60	9.60	9.80	19.40	115.70
2nd place, silver medalist(s)	Hrant Shahinyan	Soviet Union	9.30	9.60	18.90	9.80	9.95	19.75	9.90	9.50	19.40	9.05	9.45	18.50	9.50	9.85	19.35	9.45	9.60	19.05	114.95
3rd place, bronze medalist(s)	Josef Stalder	Switzerland	9.15	9.50	18.65	9.45	9.65	19.10	9.65	9.55	19.20	9.45	9.35	18.80	9.80	9.70	19.50	9.65	9.85	19.50	114.75
4	Valentin Muratov	Soviet Union	9.35	9.50	18.85	9.45	9.90	19.35	9.70	8.60	18.30	9.25	9.45	18.70	9.55	9.70	19.25	9.65	9.55	19.20	113.65
5	Hans Eugster	Switzerland	8.40	9.30	17.70	9.60	9.80	19.40	9.25	9.30	18.55	9.40	9.55	18.95	9.85	9.80	19.65	9.65	9.50	19.15	113.40
6	Vladimir Belyakov	Soviet Union	9.25	9.50	18.75	9.25	9.70	18.95	9.60	9.50	19.10	9.10	9.40	18.50	9.45	9.80	19.25	9.25	9.55	18.80	113.35
6	Yevgeny Korolkov	Soviet Union	9.00	9.30	18.30	9.45	9.70	19.15	9.75	9.65	19.40	8.90	9.50	18.40	9.50	9.80	19.30	9.35	9.45	18.80	113.35
8	Jean Tschabold	Switzerland	8.95	9.20	18.15	9.15	9.60	18.75	9.55	9.50	19.05	9.45	9.25	18.70	9.65	9.65	19.30	9.65	9.70	19.35	113.30
9	Helmut Bantz	Germany	8.95	9.25	18.20	9.35	9.60	18.95	9.40	9.55	18.95	9.40	9.40	18.80	9.60	9.50	19.10	9.65	9.60	19.25	113.25
10	Iosif Berdiev	Soviet Union	9.25	9.40	18.65	9.50	9.60	19.10	9.55	9.25	18.80	9.30	9.60	18.90	9.45	9.70	19.15	9.20	9.30	18.50	113.10
11	Mikhail Perelman	Soviet Union	8.70	9.45	18.15	9.35	9.70	19.05	9.70	9.60	19.30	9.05	9.25	18.30	9.25	9.75	19.00	9.30	9.40	18.70	112.50
12	Takashi Ono	Japan	9.40	9.65	19.05	8.95	9.20	18.15	9.40	9.00	18.40	9.50	9.60	19.10	9.45	9.15	18.60	9.45	9.45	18.90	112.20
13	Ferdinand Daniš	Czechoslovakia	9.40	9.50	18.90	9.45	9.40	18.85	9.55	8.70	18.25	9.35	9.45	18.80	9.70	9.60	19.30	9.10	8.80	17.90	112.00
14	Onni Lappalainen	Finland	9.30	9.70	19.00	9.30	9.65	18.95	9.00	8.50	17.50	9.35	9.25	18.60	9.45	9.60	19.05	9.40	9.35	18.75	111.85
15	Masao Takemoto	Japan	9.20	9.65	18.85	9.40	9.80	19.20	8.90	8.65	17.55	9.55	9.60	19.15	9.10	8.85	17.95	9.35	9.60	18.95	111.65
15	Tadao Uesako	Japan	9.55	9.60	19.15	9.00	9.35	18.35	9.15	8.85	18.00	9.55	9.55	19.10	9.20	9.30	18.50	9.05	9.50	18.55	111.65
17	Jack Günthard	Switzerland	7.95	9.20	17.15	9.15	9.55	18.70	9.50	9.35	18.85	9.15	9.15	18.30	9.55	9.50	19.05	9.75	9.80	19.55	111.60
18	Lajos Sántha	Hungary	9.30	9.40	18.70	9.20	9.45	18.65	9.25	9.35	18.60	8.95	9.20	18.15	9.45	9.15	18.60	9.40	9.40	18.80	111.50
19	Berndt Lindfors	Finland	9.10	9.50	18.60	9.40	9.75	19.15	9.45	9.30	18.75	9.00	9.00	18.00	9.05	8.70	17.75	9.60	9.60	19.20	111.45
20	Paavo Aaltonen	Finland	9.10	9.45	18.55	9.05	9.40	18.45	8.40	9.70	18.10	9.25	9.25	18.50	9.00	9.65	18.65	9.55	9.60	19.15	111.40
21	Akitomo Kaneko	Japan	9.30	9.25	18.55	9.40	9.45	18.85	9.35	7.90	17.25	9.25	9.30	18.55	9.50	9.70	19.20	9.50	9.40	18.90	111.30
22	Hans Sauter	Austria	8.60	9.00	17.60	9.30	9.30	18.60	9.60	9.55	19.15	9.20	9.15	18.35	9.40	9.35	18.75	9.30	9.40	18.70	111.15
23	Ferenc Pataki	Hungary	9.15	9.60	18.75	9.10	9.50	18.60	9.35	8.40	17.75	9.30	9.40	18.70	9.40	9.05	18.45	9.40	9.25	18.65	110.90
24	Adalbert Dickhut	Germany	8.90	9.50	18.40	9.05	9.35	18.40	9.60	9.15	18.75	9.40	9.45	18.85	9.40	9.45	18.85	7.95	9.65	17.60	110.85
25	Melchior Thalmann	Switzerland	8.00	9.00	17.00	8.80	9.50	18.30	9.45	9.40	18.85	9.30	9.30	18.60	9.40	9.35	18.75	9.65	9.60	19.25	110.75
26	Theo Wied	Germany	8.50	9.05	17.55	9.00	9.40	18.40	9.50	8.70	18.20	9.45	9.50	18.95	9.45	9.55	19.00	9.45	9.15	18.60	110.70
27	Alfred Schwarzmann	Germany	8.60	8.90	17.50	9.00	9.25	18.25	9.20	8.40	17.60	9.30	9.50	18.80	9.55	9.45	19.00	9.70	9.80	19.50	110.65
28	Kaino Lempinen	Finland	9.25	9.50	18.75	8.85	9.30	18.15	9.15	9.30	18.45	9.20	9.20	18.40	9.35	8.70	18.05	9.40	9.40	18.80	110.60
29	Heikki Savolainen	Finland	7.60	9.45	17.05	9.40	9.45	18.85	9.55	9.50	19.05	8.75	9.10	17.85	9.00	9.20	18.20	9.75	9.70	19.45	110.45
30	Zdeněk Růžička	Czechoslovakia	9.00	9.35	18.35	9.45	9.50	18.95	9.45	9.35	18.80	9.05	9.00	18.05	9.05	8.90	17.95	8.95	9.35	18.30	110.40
30	Ed Scrobe	United States	8.80	9.05	17.85	9.35	9.05	18.40	9.30	8.80	18.10	9.35	9.00	18.35	9.35	9.45	18.80	9.50	9.40	18.90	110.40
32	Josy Stoffel	Luxembourg	8.95	8.90	17.85	9.35	9.35	18.70	9.30	8.80	18.10	9.30	9.25	18.55	9.40	9.30	18.70	9.35	9.10	18.45	110.35
33	Hans Pfann	Germany	8.50	9.10	17.60	9.40	9.50	18.90	9.40	9.25	18.65	9.00	9.10	18.10	9.45	9.30	18.75	9.60	8.60	18.20	110.20
34	Bob Stout	United States	9.10	9.80	18.90	9.20	9.20	18.40	8.75	8.80	17.55	8.80	9.40	18.20	9.30	9.25	18.55	9.25	9.30	18.55	110.15
35	Kalevi Laitinen	Finland	9.45	9.50	18.95	8.60	9.30	17.90	9.05	9.00	18.05	9.20	9.20	18.40	9.10	9.15	18.25	9.75	8.80	18.55	110.10
35	Tetsumi Nabeya	Japan	9.30	9.45	18.75	8.70	9.30	18.00	8.20	9.00	17.20	9.35	9.30	18.65	9.40	9.20	18.60	9.30	9.60	18.90	110.10
37	Josef Svoboda	Czechoslovakia	9.10	9.30	18.40	9.30	9.45	18.75	9.30	8.55	17.85	9.15	9.35	18.50	9.25	9.15	18.40	9.35	8.80	18.15	110.05
38	Kalevi Viskari	Finland	8.05	9.45	17.50	8.30	9.20	17.50	9.10	9.40	18.50	9.45	9.25	18.70	9.45	9.00	18.45	9.60	9.55	19.15	109.80
39	Ernst Gebendinger	Switzerland	8.75	9.30	18.05	8.50	9.20	17.70	9.35	9.20	18.55	9.40	8.95	18.35	9.65	8.85	18.50	9.65	8.95	18.60	109.75
40	Erich Wied	Germany	8.35	8.90	17.25	9.00	9.35	18.35	8.80	9.25	18.05	8.95	9.40	18.35	9.30	9.35	18.65	9.60	9.45	19.05	109.70
41	Leo Sotorník	Czechoslovakia	8.80	9.25	18.05	9.20	9.25	18.45	9.30	9.15	18.45	9.35	9.50	18.85	9.35	8.75	18.10	9.05	8.55	17.60	109.50
42	Olavi Rove	Finland	8.30	9.45	17.75	9.30	9.35	18.65	8.60	9.15	17.75	8.15	9.50	17.65	9.40	9.45	18.85	9.40	9.40	18.80	109.45
43	Mincho Todorov	Bulgaria	9.30	9.30	18.60	9.35	9.10	18.45	8.95	8.50	17.45	9.15	9.20	18.35	9.00	8.95	17.95	9.30	9.05	18.35	109.15
44	Josef Škvor	Czechoslovakia	8.90	8.95	17.85	9.40	9.35	18.75	9.30	9.30	18.60	9.20	9.15	18.35	9.20	9.40	18.60	9.15	7.80	16.95	109.10
45	Jindřich Mikulec	Czechoslovakia	9.20	9.35	18.55	9.25	8.95	18.20	8.80	8.65	17.45	9.10	8.95	18.05	9.35	9.30	18.65	9.20	8.85	18.05	108.95
46	József Fekete	Hungary	9.20	9.30	18.50	8.95	9.40	18.35	9.55	9.45	19.00	9.20	9.30	18.50	9.15	8.70	17.85	8.65	8.05	16.70	108.90
47	Guido Figone	Italy	9.25	9.40	18.65	9.45	9.10	18.55	9.40	8.80	18.20	8.70	8.25	16.95	9.20	9.35	18.55	9.05	8.90	17.95	108.85
48	Károly Kocsis	Hungary	9.00	9.20	18.20	9.15	9.35	18.50	9.45	9.10	18.55	9.10	8.95	18.05	9.30	8.50	17.80	9.25	8.30	17.55	108.65
48	Friedel Overwien	Germany	7.70	8.80	16.50	9.10	9.30	18.40	9.55	9.25	18.80	9.10	9.30	18.40	9.35	9.10	18.45	9.35	8.75	18.10	108.65
50	Ali Zaky	Egypt	8.25	9.25	17.50	9.45	9.70	19.15	8.85	8.90	17.75	9.45	9.00	18.45	9.40	9.40	18.80	7.65	9.30	16.95	108.60
51	Michel Mathiot	France	8.40	9.15	17.55	8.90	8.60	17.50	9.15	9.15	18.30	9.05	9.30	18.35	9.35	9.20	18.55	8.95	9.30	18.25	108.50
52	Ferenc Kemény	Hungary	8.10	8.90	17.00	9.45	9.70	19.15	9.35	8.95	18.30	9.20	8.90	18.10	8.75	9.00	17.75	9.05	9.05	18.10	108.40
52	Hans Schwarzentruber	Switzerland	8.30	9.10	17.40	9.15	9.30	18.45	9.00	8.00	17.00	9.25	9.15	18.40	9.55	9.40	18.95	9.35	8.85	18.20	108.40
54	Vladimír Kejř	Czechoslovakia	8.95	9.30	18.25	9.40	9.40	18.80	8.60	8.85	17.45	9.00	9.20	18.20	9.20	8.55	17.75	8.80	8.90	17.70	108.15
55	Ernst Fivian	Switzerland	8.60	9.55	18.15	8.95	9.35	18.30	9.35	7.50	16.85	9.40	9.50	18.90	8.70	9.60	18.30	8.10	9.35	17.45	107.95
56	Joaquín Blume	Spain	9.20	9.25	18.45	9.20	9.25	18.45	8.00	8.25	16.25	9.30	8.90	18.20	9.00	9.10	18.10	9.15	9.30	18.45	107.90
57	Sándor Réthy	Hungary	9.20	9.25	18.45	8.60	9.20	17.80	9.55	9.15	18.70	9.10	9.10	18.20	8.60	8.80	17.40	8.65	8.55	17.20	107.75
58	Lajos Tóth	Hungary	8.60	9.15	17.75	8.25	9.10	17.35	8.20	9.00	17.20	9.05	9.25	18.30	9.30	9.10	18.40	9.15	9.30	18.45	107.45
59	Bill Roetzheim	United States	8.85	9.10	17.95	7.90	7.95	15.85	9.25	9.35	18.60	8.85	8.75	17.60	9.15	8.95	18.10	9.60	9.35	18.95	107.05
60	Szymon Sobala	Poland	9.10	8.80	17.90	9.15	8.85	18.00	9.40	8.50	17.90	9.15	8.00	17.15	9.20	8.95	18.15	8.80	9.05	17.85	106.95
61	János Mogyorósi-Klencs	Hungary	8.55	9.40	17.95	8.95	9.35	18.30	7.40	9.00	16.40	9.40	9.45	18.85	9.10	8.50	17.60	9.00	8.70	17.70	106.80
61	Ernst Wister	Austria	8.70	9.35	18.05	8.80	9.05	17.85	8.70	8.50	17.20	9.10	8.50	17.60	9.05	9.20	18.25	8.60	9.25	17.85	106.80
63	Miloš Kolejka	Czechoslovakia	8.15	9.25	17.40	8.45	9.40	17.85	9.25	8.50	17.75	8.85	9.20	18.05	9.20	8.70	17.90	9.15	8.60	17.75	106.70
64	Littorio Sampieri	Italy	8.80	8.95	17.75	9.25	9.20	18.45	8.60	8.85	17.45	9.15	9.25	18.40	9.00	9.35	18.35	8.30	7.75	16.05	106.45
65	Vasil Konstantinov	Bulgaria	8.30	9.05	17.35	9.15	9.50	18.65	8.50	9.10	17.60	9.00	8.85	17.85	8.95	8.95	17.90	8.55	8.35	16.90	106.25
66	Poul Jessen	Denmark	8.85	9.05	17.90	8.35	9.15	17.50	8.90	9.10	18.00	9.30	9.05	18.35	8.85	7.80	16.65	8.80	8.80	17.60	106.00
67	Volmer Thomsen	Denmark	8.60	8.85	17.45	8.90	8.90	17.80	8.80	8.70	17.50	9.30	9.10	18.40	9.00	8.25	17.25	8.80	8.60	17.40	105.80
68	Dimitar Yordanov	Bulgaria	8.60	8.65	17.25	9.20	9.25	18.45	7.00	8.55	15.55	9.05	9.05	18.10	8.90	9.15	18.05	9.10	9.15	18.25	105.65
69	Luigi Zanetti	Italy	8.40	9.15	17.55	7.95	9.00	16.95	9.35	8.70	18.05	9.15	9.15	18.30	9.00	8.75	17.75	7.80	9.15	16.95	105.55
70	Raymond Dot	France	8.10	9.45	17.55	9.30	9.40	18.70	4.75	8.95	13.70	9.30	9.35	18.65	9.30	9.10	18.40	9.05	9.30	18.35	105.35
71	Frederic Orendi	Romania	8.75	8.45	17.20	8.50	8.95	17.45	8.80	8.00	16.80	8.40	9.00	17.40	9.05	8.95	18.00	9.25	8.95	18.20	105.05
72	Andrei Kerekes	Romania	8.75	8.95	17.70	9.00	9.30	18.30	9.00	8.80	17.80	8.45	9.15	17.60	8.95	7.65	16.60	8.30	8.65	16.95	104.95
73	Frank Turner	Great Britain	7.75	7.90	15.65	9.15	9.05	18.20	9.05	9.00	18.05	9.20	9.05	18.25	9.10	8.65	17.75	8.25	8.55	16.80	104.70
74	Wolfgang Girardi	Austria	8.15	8.60	16.75	8.10	9.05	17.15	7.55	7.70	15.25	9.45	9.40	18.85	9.15	9.15	18.30	9.10	9.10	18.20	104.50
75	Freddy Jensen	Denmark	8.40	9.15	17.55	8.90	9.25	18.15	8.50	9.10	17.60	7.80	9.00	16.80	7.55	8.90	16.45	8.70	9.05	17.75	104.30
76	Mathias Jamtvedt	Norway	8.75	9.05	17.80	8.75	8.70	17.45	7.70	7.55	15.25	9.25	9.30	18.55	8.85	8.80	17.65	8.90	8.50	17.40	104.10
77	Nikolay Milev	Bulgaria	8.60	8.15	16.75	9.10	9.15	18.25	9.40	8.80	18.20	7.65	9.05	16.70	9.15	8.75	17.90	9.05	7.00	16.05	103.85
78	Dmytro Leonkin	Soviet Union	8.95	9.55	18.50	9.55	9.85	19.40	3.75	8.35	12.10	9.20	9.50	18.70	7.10	9.60	16.70	9.05	9.30	18.35	103.75
79	Orlando Polmonari	Italy	8.40	8.35	16.75	8.85	8.90	17.75	9.00	8.50	17.50	9.05	9.20	18.25	8.90	8.70	17.60	8.20	7.55	15.75	103.60
80	Don Holder	United States	8.00	8.20	16.20	8.70	8.20	16.90	9.10	9.20	18.30	9.20	8.80	18.00	9.05	8.00	17.05	9.05	8.00	17.05	103.50
81	Jack Beckner	United States	8.15	9.25	17.40	7.10	8.00	15.10	8.40	8.60	17.00	9.25	8.80	18.05	8.85	9.00	17.85	9.10	8.90	18.00	103.40
82	Alf Olsen	Norway	8.50	9.15	17.65	8.80	8.60	17.40	7.25	6.90	14.15	9.25	8.90	18.15	9.10	9.05	18.15	8.85	9.00	17.85	103.35
83	Todor Todorov	Bulgaria	9.30	8.75	18.05	8.80	8.65	17.45	7.70	8.20	15.90	9.05	9.00	18.05	9.00	9.20	18.20	8.40	7.15	15.55	103.20
84	Anders Lindh	Sweden	9.35	9.60	18.95	8.45	8.95	17.40	6.15	6.45	12.60	9.40	9.40	18.80	9.00	9.00	18.00	8.80	8.60	17.40	103.15
84	Alf Nørgaard	Norway	7.90	8.35	16.25	9.00	8.90	17.90	8.70	7.50	16.20	9.20	9.10	18.30	8.80	8.45	17.25	8.55	8.70	17.25	103.15
86	Fabio Bonacina	Italy	7.90	8.30	16.20	9.15	9.00	18.15	9.20	8.50	17.70	8.35	9.00	17.35	9.00	8.70	17.70	8.95	6.90	15.85	102.95
86	André Weingand	France	8.20	8.90	17.10	8.00	8.85	16.85	8.85	8.75	17.60	8.95	8.85	17.80	9.20	8.90	18.10	6.50	9.00	15.50	102.95
88	Dušan Furlan	Yugoslavia	8.55	8.05	16.60	7.80	8.60	16.40	8.35	7.85	16.20	9.40	9.15	18.55	9.00	8.60	17.60	8.45	8.90	17.35	102.70
89	Charles Simms	United States	7.80	8.85	16.65	8.35	7.80	16.15	8.05	8.05	16.10	9.30	9.15	18.45	7.25	8.80	16.05	9.45	9.55	19.00	102.40
90	Raymond Badin	France	6.90	8.75	15.65	8.75	9.05	17.80	8.50	9.35	17.85	7.55	8.85	16.40	9.20	8.90	18.10	7.55	9.00	16.55	102.35
90	Walter Blattmann	United States	7.80	8.50	16.30	8.20	7.70	15.90	8.90	8.60	17.50	9.25	9.10	18.35	9.10	8.50	17.60	8.25	8.45	16.70	102.35
92	Arne Knudsen	Norway	8.90	9.10	18.00	8.75	8.35	17.10	7.90	7.40	15.30	9.10	9.00	18.10	9.10	7.70	16.80	8.40	8.60	17.00	102.30
93	Børge Nielsen	Denmark	8.05	8.80	16.85	8.95	9.05	18.00	8.30	7.20	15.50	8.70	8.90	17.60	8.70	8.40	17.10	8.75	8.40	17.15	102.20
94	Georg Johansen	Norway	8.90	9.25	18.15	8.80	8.95	17.75	5.85	7.90	13.75	9.30	9.10	18.40	8.65	8.60	17.25	8.90	7.85	16.75	102.05
95	Willi Welt	Austria	8.35	8.05	16.40	7.70	8.20	15.90	8.25	8.85	17.10	9.20	9.25	18.45	9.35	9.10	18.45	8.75	6.95	15.70	102.00
96	Nikolay Atanasov	Bulgaria	7.00	8.25	15.25	9.15	8.80	17.95	8.95	8.30	17.25	8.85	9.05	17.90	8.65	8.30	16.95	8.20	8.45	16.65	101.95
97	René Changeat	France	9.20	9.65	18.85	4.75	8.45	13.20	7.90	8.00	15.90	9.25	9.20	18.45	8.90	8.95	17.85	8.60	8.85	17.45	101.70
98	Jack Whitford	Great Britain	8.25	7.25	15.50	8.95	8.65	17.60	9.05	8.50	17.55	9.05	8.65	17.70	9.10	8.55	17.65	7.25	8.40	15.65	101.65
99	Arrigo Carnoli	Italy	8.90	9.30	18.20	7.65	8.60	16.25	8.40	8.00	16.40	8.80	9.00	17.80	7.50	8.30	15.80	8.10	8.75	16.85	101.30
100	Vincent D'Autorio	United States	8.00	9.20	17.20	7.85	7.35	15.20	8.85	9.05	17.90	7.10	9.15	16.25	9.00	8.90	17.90	8.75	8.00	16.75	101.20
101	Franz Kemter	Austria	7.00	7.90	14.90	7.20	8.35	15.55	9.05	8.90	17.95	8.90	8.50	17.40	9.20	8.70	17.90	8.95	8.25	17.20	100.90
101	Pawel Swietek	Poland	8.85	8.85	17.70	9.20	8.70	17.90	8.05	8.45	16.50	8.45	7.50	15.95	8.80	8.95	17.75	8.20	6.90	15.10	100.90
103	Armand Huberty	Luxembourg	8.30	7.85	16.15	7.75	8.35	16.10	8.65	7.65	16.30	8.35	8.50	16.85	8.90	8.80	17.70	8.65	9.00	17.65	100.75
104	Georges Floquet	France	7.70	8.20	15.90	7.85	8.15	16.00	9.00	8.95	17.95	8.25	8.95	17.20	9.15	8.30	17.45	7.35	8.55	15.90	100.40
105	Bjarne Jørgensen	Denmark	7.60	8.40	16.00	8.50	8.95	17.45	7.20	6.90	14.10	9.05	8.95	18.00	8.85	7.95	16.80	9.25	8.65	17.90	100.25
106	Jean Guillou	France	8.40	8.70	17.10	7.25	8.60	15.85	7.50	7.95	15.45	8.90	8.00	16.90	9.35	8.95	18.30	8.45	8.00	16.45	100.05
107	Arne Carlsson	Sweden	8.75	9.35	18.10	6.70	7.60	14.30	7.95	6.15	14.10	9.30	9.10	18.40	9.00	9.00	18.00	8.45	8.65	17.10	100.00
107	Odd Lie	Norway	8.45	8.95	17.40	8.95	8.85	17.80	8.80	5.90	14.70	9.25	9.10	18.35	8.60	8.05	16.65	7.00	8.10	15.10	100.00
109	Pawel Gawron	Poland	8.50	8.10	16.60	8.70	8.00	16.70	8.95	8.75	17.70	8.00	5.50	13.50	8.85	9.00	17.85	9.05	8.40	17.45	99.80
110	Silvio Brivio	Italy	6.20	7.30	13.50	8.70	8.95	17.65	9.05	8.70	17.75	8.50	7.35	15.85	8.75	8.90	17.65	8.95	8.25	17.20	99.60
111	Zdzislaw Lesinski	Poland	8.20	8.70	16.90	9.35	8.95	18.30	8.50	7.55	16.05	9.10	8.25	17.35	6.00	8.85	14.85	8.80	7.30	16.10	99.55
112	Paul Grubenthal	Austria	7.25	9.10	16.35	5.50	8.60	14.10	8.15	7.25	15.40	9.25	9.15	18.40	9.10	8.50	17.60	9.00	8.65	17.65	99.50
113	Pawel Gaca	Poland	8.75	8.55	17.30	2.00	8.35	10.35	8.80	9.00	17.80	8.95	9.25	18.20	8.90	9.00	17.90	9.05	8.70	17.75	99.30
114	Quinto Vadi	Italy	7.40	7.85	15.25	7.85	9.00	16.85	8.90	8.85	17.75	8.30	8.90	17.20	8.50	8.95	17.45	6.00	8.70	14.70	99.20
115	Ken Buffin	Great Britain	7.20	7.20	14.40	8.70	8.75	17.45	8.50	7.75	16.25	9.00	7.90	16.90	8.85	7.50	16.35	9.45	8.35	17.80	99.15
116	Rafael Lecuona	Cuba	7.55	8.15	15.70	7.95	8.45	16.40	9.15	8.30	17.45	8.00	8.75	16.75	8.90	7.10	16.00	8.10	8.70	16.80	99.10
117	Jerzy Jokiel	Poland	9.55	9.60	19.15	8.00	8.00	16.00	7.30	5.50	12.80	9.15	7.50	16.65	8.50	8.60	17.10	9.00	8.30	17.30	99.00
118	Ryszard Kucjas	Poland	8.75	8.55	17.30	9.00	8.35	17.35	6.50	6.80	13.30	8.35	9.00	17.35	8.40	8.80	17.20	8.25	8.10	16.35	98.85
119	Arthur Schmitt	Saar	7.15	8.10	15.25	8.65	9.00	17.65	8.20	8.35	16.55	5.65	8.85	14.50	8.95	8.60	17.55	9.05	8.25	17.30	98.80
120	Magne Kleiven	Norway	7.80	8.30	16.10	8.80	9.00	17.80	8.35	8.05	16.40	8.70	8.70	17.40	7.90	7.70	15.60	6.50	8.70	15.20	98.50
121	Kurt Wigartz	Sweden	8.80	9.20	18.00	6.50	7.10	13.60	8.25	6.80	15.05	9.20	9.00	18.20	8.95	8.30	17.25	8.00	8.35	16.35	98.45
122	Börje Stattin	Sweden	8.30	9.35	17.65	7.00	8.75	15.75	9.00	1.00	10.00	9.25	8.80	18.05	9.30	9.05	18.35	9.20	9.40	18.60	98.40
123	William Thoresson	Sweden	9.45	9.80	19.25	7.25	7.65	14.90	5.75	6.00	11.75	9.10	8.70	17.80	9.15	9.00	18.15	9.30	7.20	16.50	98.35
124	Mihai Botez	Romania	7.80	8.65	16.45	9.15	9.35	18.50	7.75	8.50	16.25	6.50	9.00	15.50	8.90	8.95	17.85	5.50	8.15	13.65	98.20
125	Mahmoud Safwat	Egypt	8.35	8.75	17.10	7.80	8.85	16.65	4.50	6.65	11.15	9.10	9.50	18.60	8.45	7.35	15.80	9.25	9.10	18.35	97.65
126	Ahmed Issam Allam	Egypt	7.80	8.65	16.45	8.90	9.15	18.05	3.50	4.75	8.25	9.35	9.40	18.75	9.10	8.90	18.00	8.75	8.95	17.70	97.20
126	Frederik De Waele	Belgium	8.75	8.75	17.50	8.35	7.90	16.25	8.00	7.35	15.35	8.85	8.80	17.65	7.85	8.25	16.10	6.60	7.75	14.35	97.20
126	Jey Kugeler	Luxembourg	7.30	6.90	14.20	8.40	8.75	17.15	6.00	8.20	14.20	8.60	9.10	17.70	8.85	8.80	17.65	7.80	8.50	16.30	97.20
129	Børge Minerth	Denmark	8.15	8.60	16.75	9.05	9.20	18.25	7.90	7.55	15.45	9.10	7.75	16.85	7.10	5.45	12.55	8.85	8.40	17.25	97.10
130	Nils Sjöberg	Sweden	8.25	9.05	17.30	6.15	7.10	13.25	6.35	7.00	13.35	9.10	8.80	17.90	8.85	8.75	17.60	8.90	8.55	17.45	96.85
131	Marcel Coppin	Luxembourg	8.20	7.95	16.15	7.50	8.20	15.70	7.30	6.40	13.70	9.10	9.25	18.35	8.65	7.40	16.05	8.30	7.80	16.10	96.05
132	Juan Caviglia	Argentina	8.80	9.30	18.10	7.85	8.10	15.95	7.45	7.70	15.15	8.40	8.85	17.25	7.90	6.75	14.65	6.90	7.85	14.75	95.85
132	Gunnar Pedersen	Denmark	7.00	8.10	15.10	7.75	8.40	16.15	7.75	7.00	14.75	9.10	8.85	17.95	8.75	6.50	15.25	8.40	8.25	16.65	95.85
134	Hubert Erang	Luxembourg	8.15	8.55	16.70	7.10	8.10	15.20	7.80	6.00	13.80	8.90	9.25	18.15	8.40	7.45	15.85	8.20	7.80	16.00	95.70
135	Magdy Gheriani	Egypt	8.45	8.60	17.05	8.60	8.90	17.50	3.00	7.55	10.55	8.95	9.10	18.05	8.90	8.85	17.75	6.40	8.25	14.65	95.55
136	Ede Madar	Yugoslavia	8.85	8.60	17.45	8.05	7.50	15.55	6.50	7.25	13.75	8.20	9.00	17.20	8.05	8.35	16.40	7.45	7.50	14.95	95.30
137	Ahmed Khalil El-Giddawi	Egypt	8.25	7.70	15.95	7.70	7.70	15.40	6.25	7.45	13.70	8.55	8.95	17.50	8.20	8.20	16.40	7.70	8.50	16.20	95.15
138	Sreten Stefanovic	Yugoslavia	8.30	7.50	15.80	8.85	9.20	18.05	7.85	5.50	13.35	9.20	7.50	16.70	8.55	8.40	16.95	6.90	6.90	13.80	94.65
139	Ronnie Lombard	South Africa	7.80	7.00	14.80	6.70	8.00	14.70	7.80	7.25	15.05	9.05	8.90	17.95	8.05	7.00	15.05	8.40	8.60	17.00	94.55
140	Ernst Madland	Norway	8.05	8.75	16.80	8.20	8.65	16.85	7.05	8.25	15.30	8.65	8.25	16.90	8.75	8.00	16.75	2.90	8.85	11.75	94.35
140	Iliya Topalov	Bulgaria	9.10	8.80	17.90	9.30	9.20	18.50	9.15	6.00	15.15	6.60	9.05	15.65	9.25	6.50	15.75	6.90	4.50	11.40	94.35
142	Ivica Jelic	Yugoslavia	6.30	7.70	14.00	7.95	7.95	15.90	7.65	7.40	15.05	8.40	9.10	17.50	8.40	8.15	16.55	7.20	8.10	15.30	94.30
143	Walter Müller	Saar	7.05	7.75	14.80	7.55	7.90	15.45	7.60	6.00	13.60	8.60	8.75	17.35	8.40	7.80	16.20	9.05	7.75	16.80	94.20
144	Ivan Caklec	Yugoslavia	8.20	8.60	16.80	6.00	7.90	13.90	5.10	8.50	13.60	9.55	9.15	18.70	8.65	8.40	17.05	7.25	6.65	13.90	93.95
145	Marcel de Wolf	France	8.30	7.95	16.25	7.70	8.20	15.90	7.90	8.55	16.45	8.40	8.85	17.25	8.10	7.00	15.10	6.50	6.40	12.90	93.85
146	Manuel Gouveia	Portugal	7.40	8.95	16.35	7.65	8.35	16.00	6.80	4.85	11.65	9.00	8.65	17.65	6.70	8.25	14.95	8.25	8.50	16.75	93.35
147	Ángel Aguiar	Cuba	8.70	8.10	16.80	7.85	9.05	16.90	8.35	7.60	15.95	8.75	8.60	17.35	7.45	8.00	15.45	4.50	5.70	10.20	92.65
148	Jerzy Solarz	Poland	9.45	8.85	18.30	6.95	8.35	15.30	7.80	7.90	15.70	8.80	7.25	16.05	8.80	8.65	17.45	3.25	6.25	9.50	92.30
149	Franjo Jurjevic	Yugoslavia	7.40	8.25	15.65	6.80	8.45	15.25	5.00	5.80	10.80	9.40	9.25	18.65	9.00	8.00	17.00	6.15	8.60	14.75	92.10
150	Jakob Kiefer	Germany	8.75	–	8.75	8.70	9.20	17.90	9.45	9.45	18.90	9.00	–	9.00	9.45	9.20	18.65	9.45	9.05	18.50	91.70
150	Rolf Lauer	Saar	7.55	8.35	15.90	7.40	7.25	14.65	8.05	6.25	14.30	8.15	8.05	16.20	7.70	7.70	15.40	8.35	6.90	15.25	91.70
152	George Weedon	Great Britain	6.70	7.50	14.20	8.30	8.45	16.75	7.45	7.60	15.05	8.35	9.00	17.35	6.15	7.75	13.90	8.20	5.90	14.10	91.35
153	Heinz Ostheimer	Saar	7.85	8.50	16.35	8.35	8.45	16.80	8.85	7.10	15.95	8.80	8.85	17.65	6.70	7.90	14.60	2.00	7.80	9.80	91.15
154	Ragai Youssef	Egypt	5.50	7.75	13.25	5.90	7.10	13.00	8.35	8.40	16.75	8.75	8.65	17.40	8.55	7.90	16.45	7.10	6.75	13.85	90.70
155	Norbert Dietrich	Saar	6.00	7.85	13.85	8.90	8.55	17.45	7.50	5.65	13.15	6.90	7.00	13.90	8.20	7.65	15.85	8.85	7.10	15.95	90.15
156	Fred Wiedersporn	Saar	8.35	7.80	16.15	5.40	7.35	12.75	7.85	7.50	15.35	8.65	8.75	17.40	6.60	6.30	12.90	8.00	7.25	15.25	89.80
157	César Bonoris	Argentina	7.00	7.90	14.90	8.05	7.75	15.80	3.00	7.05	10.05	8.95	6.50	15.45	8.75	7.85	16.60	8.00	8.00	16.00	88.80
157	Francisc Cocis	Romania	8.20	8.60	16.80	8.10	8.55	16.65	5.25	6.80	12.05	8.50	8.85	17.35	6.25	8.20	14.45	4.50	7.00	11.50	88.80
159	Mohamed Sayed Hamdi	Egypt	7.20	7.25	14.45	6.90	7.65	14.55	5.50	7.85	13.35	7.75	8.70	16.45	8.65	5.00	13.65	8.10	8.15	16.25	88.70
160	Graham Harcourt	Great Britain	7.90	7.00	14.90	8.45	7.10	15.55	6.85	4.50	11.35	8.55	8.10	16.65	8.70	7.25	15.95	7.80	6.45	14.25	88.65
161	Eugen Balint	Romania	8.15	8.30	16.45	8.25	7.75	16.00	6.50	7.50	14.00	6.00	8.95	14.95	7.55	8.40	15.95	4.50	6.75	11.25	88.60
162	Joaquim Granger	Portugal	7.35	8.10	15.45	8.00	9.05	17.05	6.05	5.25	11.30	6.25	7.00	13.25	8.45	7.80	16.25	7.65	7.55	15.20	88.50
163	René Schroeder	Luxembourg	7.90	7.30	15.20	7.85	8.55	16.40	4.75	3.50	8.25	7.70	8.75	16.45	7.90	7.55	15.45	7.85	8.35	16.20	87.95
164	Jeroom Riske	Belgium	8.30	8.35	16.65	7.00	6.95	13.95	6.15	6.65	12.80	8.60	8.95	17.55	8.10	7.15	15.25	7.65	3.50	11.15	87.35
165	Carol Bedö	Romania	8.85	9.05	17.90	6.80	7.90	14.70	6.85	7.75	14.60	8.55	8.95	17.50	7.70	7.55	15.25	1.75	5.50	7.25	87.20
166	Erich Peters	Sweden	6.80	0.00	6.80	6.85	8.10	14.95	8.25	8.50	16.75	6.65	8.75	15.40	8.90	9.00	17.90	6.60	8.60	15.20	87.00
167	Peter Starling	Great Britain	6.50	7.00	13.50	8.35	7.65	16.00	6.10	6.30	12.40	8.35	8.50	16.85	7.05	6.50	13.55	7.00	7.00	14.00	86.30
168	Friedrich Fetz	Austria	8.20	8.00	16.20	7.55	7.75	15.30	5.25	7.00	12.25	9.10	8.60	17.70	8.40	–	8.40	7.80	8.45	16.25	86.10
169	Jack Wells	South Africa	7.70	7.05	14.75	7.40	8.25	15.65	6.80	4.75	11.55	9.10	9.05	18.15	8.25	5.00	13.25	6.45	6.10	12.55	85.90
170	Zoltan Balogh	Romania	7.80	8.20	16.00	7.85	8.95	16.80	6.50	7.25	13.75	7.55	9.10	16.65	7.90	7.90	15.80	1.25	5.50	6.75	85.75
171	Rolf Yelseth	South Africa	5.50	6.75	12.25	7.65	8.50	16.15	7.00	5.25	12.25	7.05	7.35	14.40	7.70	7.50	15.20	7.60	7.80	15.40	85.65
172	Aurel Losnita	Romania	7.00	8.20	15.20	7.80	8.90	16.70	4.75	4.50	9.25	8.45	9.10	17.55	7.00	8.50	15.50	5.30	6.10	11.40	85.60
173	Manuel Prazeres	Portugal	6.90	7.85	14.75	4.85	7.75	12.60	8.80	7.00	15.80	8.40	8.50	16.90	6.25	6.90	13.15	4.65	6.65	11.30	84.50
174	Raúl Caldeira	Portugal	7.65	8.65	16.30	3.50	7.60	11.10	5.70	5.75	11.45	6.50	8.05	14.55	6.95	6.30	13.25	7.80	8.35	16.15	82.80
175	Antun Kropivšek	Yugoslavia	7.30	–	7.30	8.05	7.85	15.90	7.85	7.85	15.70	8.40	–	8.40	8.65	8.25	16.90	9.20	9.05	18.25	82.45
176	Karel Janež	Yugoslavia	–	7.75	7.75	5.85	7.20	13.05	6.30	8.35	14.65	7.10	8.95	16.05	7.85	8.60	16.45	6.50	6.60	13.10	81.05
177	Francisco Cascante	Cuba	8.65	8.50	17.15	7.00	8.35	15.35	4.50	5.25	9.75	6.65	8.35	15.00	8.30	6.00	14.30	3.00	4.00	7.00	78.55
178	António Leite	Portugal	7.80	7.70	15.50	7.15	8.00	15.15	6.10	6.75	12.85	5.25	6.00	11.25	7.00	5.75	12.75	3.00	7.25	10.25	77.75
179	Maurice De Groote	Belgium	8.40	7.90	16.30	8.10	8.25	16.35	3.50	6.75	10.25	4.75	7.25	12.00	0.00	8.10	8.10	7.10	7.00	14.10	77.10
180	Hans Friedrich	Austria	6.10	–	6.10	7.75	–	7.75	9.35	8.20	17.55	9.25	9.00	18.25	9.25	8.95	18.20	4.00	–	4.00	71.85
181	Mahmoud Mohamed Reda	Egypt	8.40	8.50	16.90	4.00	7.00	11.00	8.10	8.00	16.10	7.50	8.80	16.30	6.50	3.00	9.50	0.50	–	0.50	70.30
182	Stoyan Stoyanov	Bulgaria	8.95	–	8.95	9.40	–	9.40	9.15	–	9.15	9.20	–	9.20	9.15	–	9.15	9.60	7.65	17.25	63.10
183	Manuel Cardoso	Portugal	7.10	8.00	15.10	2.00	7.80	9.80	5.55	5.30	10.85	0.00	5.65	5.65	5.00	5.00	10.00	3.50	6.60	10.10	61.50
184	Vir Singh	India	4.50	4.50	9.00	1.25	4.00	5.25	1.00	2.25	3.25	6.50	7.50	14.00	2.25	4.00	6.25	2.00	5.75	7.75	45.50
185	Khushi Ram	India	3.00	3.50	6.50	2.00	3.00	5.00	1.00	2.00	3.00	0.00	5.50	5.50	0.00	4.00	4.00	1.25	4.50	5.75	29.75
