= Gymnastics at the 1952 Summer Olympics – Men's artistic team all-around =

Men's artistic team all-around at the Games of the XV Olympiad
- Venue: Messuhalli, Exhibition Hall I
- Date: 19–21 July 1952
- Competitors: 185 from 23 nations
- Winning score: 574.35

Medalists
1st place, gold medalist(s)		Vladimir Belyakov; Iosif Berdiev; Viktor Chukarin; Yevgeny Korolkov; Dmytro Leonkin; Valentin Muratov; Mikhail Perelman; Hrant Shahinyan	Soviet Union
2nd place, silver medalist(s)		Hans Eugster; Ernst Fivian; Ernst Gebendinger; Jack Günthard; Hans Schwarzentruber; Josef Stalder; Melchior Thalmann; Jean Tschabold	Switzerland
3rd place, bronze medalist(s)		Paavo Aaltonen; Kalevi Laitinen; Onni Lappalainen; Kaino Lempinen; Berndt Lindfors; Olavi Rove; Heikki Savolainen; Kalevi Viskari	Finland

The men's artistic team all-around competition at the 1952 Summer Olympics was held at the Messuhalli, Exhibition Hall I on 19 and 21 July. It was the tenth appearance of the event.

== Competition format ==
The gymnastics format continued to use the aggregation format, though the team scoring was tweaked from previous years. Each nation entered a team of between five and eight gymnasts. All entrants in the gymnastics competitions performed both a compulsory exercise and a voluntary exercise for each apparatus. The top five individual scores in each exercise (that is, compulsory floor, voluntary floor, compulsory vault, etc.) were added to give a team score for that exercise. The 12 team exercise scores were summed to give a team total.

No separate finals were contested.

For each exercise, four judges gave scores from 0 to 10 in one-tenth point increments. The top and bottom scores were discarded and the remaining two scores averaged to give the exercise total. Thus, exercise scores ranged from 0 to 10, apparatus scores from 0 to 20, individual totals from 0 to 120, and team scores from 0 to 600.

For the vault, each competitor had two tries for each of the compulsory and voluntary vaults with the better score to count. For the other four (non-floor) apparatus exercises, the competitor had the option to make a second try only on the compulsory exercise—with the second attempt counting regardless of whether it was better than the first. For both compulsory and voluntary floor exercises, and voluntary exercises in the non-floor, non-vault apparatuses, only one attempt could be made.

== Results ==
Rank	Nation	Gymnasts	Exercise results												Team total
Rank	Nation	Gymnasts	Floor (gymnastics)		Rings (gymnastics)		Pommel horse		Vault (gymnastics)		Parallel bars		Horizontal bar		Team total
Rank	Nation	Gymnasts	C	V	C	V	C	V	C	V	C	V	C	V	Team total
1st place, gold medalist(s)	Soviet Union	Vladimir Belyakov	9.25	9.50	~~9.25~~	9.70	~~9.60~~	9.50	9.10	~~9.40~~	9.45	9.80	~~9.25~~	9.55	574.35
1st place, gold medalist(s)	Soviet Union	Iosif Berdiev	9.25	~~9.40~~	9.50	~~9.60~~	~~9.55~~	~~9.25~~	9.30	9.60	~~9.45~~	~~9.70~~	~~9.20~~	~~9.30~~	574.35
1st place, gold medalist(s)	Soviet Union	Viktor Chukarin	~~8.65~~	9.80	9.65	9.90	9.70	9.80	9.45	9.75	9.80	9.80	9.60	9.80	574.35
1st place, gold medalist(s)	Soviet Union	Yevgeny Korolkov	9.00	~~9.30~~	9.45	~~9.70~~	9.75	9.65	~~8.90~~	9.50	9.50	9.80	9.35	9.45	574.35
1st place, gold medalist(s)	Soviet Union	Dmytro Leonkin	~~8.95~~	9.55	9.55	9.85	~~3.75~~	~~8.35~~	9.20	9.50	~~7.10~~	~~9.60~~	~~9.05~~	~~9.30~~	574.35
1st place, gold medalist(s)	Soviet Union	Valentin Muratov	9.35	9.50	~~9.45~~	9.90	9.70	~~8.60~~	9.25	9.45	9.55	~~9.70~~	9.65	9.55	574.35
1st place, gold medalist(s)	Soviet Union	Mikhail Perelman	~~8.70~~	~~9.45~~	~~9.35~~	~~9.70~~	9.70	9.60	~~9.05~~	~~9.25~~	~~9.25~~	9.75	9.30	~~9.40~~	574.35
1st place, gold medalist(s)	Soviet Union	Hrant Shahinyan	9.30	9.60	9.80	9.95	9.90	9.50	~~9.05~~	~~9.45~~	9.50	9.85	9.45	9.60	574.35
1st place, gold medalist(s)	Soviet Union	Total	46.15	47.95	47.95	49.30	48.75	48.05	46.30	47.80	47.80	49.00	47.35	47.95	574.35
2nd place, silver medalist(s)	Switzerland	Hans Eugster	8.40	9.30	9.60	9.80	~~9.25~~	9.30	9.40	9.55	9.85	9.80	9.65	9.50	567.50
2nd place, silver medalist(s)	Switzerland	Ernst Fivian	8.60	9.55	~~8.95~~	~~9.35~~	9.35	~~7.50~~	9.40	9.50	~~8.70~~	9.60	~~8.10~~	~~9.35~~	567.50
2nd place, silver medalist(s)	Switzerland	Ernst Gebendinger	8.75	9.30	~~8.50~~	~~9.20~~	~~9.35~~	~~9.20~~	9.40	~~8.95~~	9.65	~~8.85~~	9.65	~~8.95~~	567.50
2nd place, silver medalist(s)	Switzerland	Jack Günthard	~~7.95~~	9.20	9.15	9.55	9.50	9.35	~~9.15~~	~~9.15~~	9.55	9.50	9.75	9.80	567.50
2nd place, silver medalist(s)	Switzerland	Hans Schwarzentruber	~~8.30~~	~~9.10~~	9.15	~~9.30~~	~~9.00~~	~~8.00~~	~~9.25~~	~~9.15~~	~~9.55~~	~~9.40~~	~~9.35~~	~~8.85~~	567.50
2nd place, silver medalist(s)	Switzerland	Josef Stalder	9.15	9.50	9.45	9.65	9.65	9.55	9.45	9.35	9.80	9.70	9.65	9.85	567.50
2nd place, silver medalist(s)	Switzerland	Melchior Thalmann	~~8.00~~	~~9.00~~	~~8.80~~	9.50	9.45	9.40	~~9.30~~	9.30	~~9.40~~	~~9.35~~	9.65	9.60	567.50
2nd place, silver medalist(s)	Switzerland	Jean Tschabold	8.95	~~9.20~~	9.15	9.60	9.55	9.50	9.45	9.25	9.65	9.65	~~9.65~~	9.70	567.50
2nd place, silver medalist(s)	Switzerland	Total	43.85	46.85	46.50	48.10	47.50	47.10	47.10	46.95	48.50	48.25	48.35	48.45	567.50
3rd place, bronze medalist(s)	Finland	Paavo Aaltonen	9.10	9.45	9.05	9.40	~~8.40~~	9.70	9.25	9.25	~~9.00~~	9.65	9.55	9.60	564.20
3rd place, bronze medalist(s)	Finland	Kalevi Laitinen	9.45	9.50	~~8.60~~	~~9.30~~	9.05	~~9.00~~	9.20	9.20	9.10	9.15	9.75	~~8.80~~	564.20
3rd place, bronze medalist(s)	Finland	Onni Lappalainen	9.30	9.70	9.30	9.65	~~9.00~~	~~8.50~~	9.35	9.25	9.45	9.60	~~9.40~~	~~9.35~~	564.20
3rd place, bronze medalist(s)	Finland	Kaino Lempinen	9.25	9.50	~~8.85~~	~~9.30~~	9.15	9.30	9.20	~~9.20~~	9.35	~~8.70~~	~~9.40~~	9.40	564.20
3rd place, bronze medalist(s)	Finland	Berndt Lindfors	9.10	9.50	9.40	9.75	9.45	9.30	~~9.00~~	~~9.00~~	~~9.05~~	~~8.70~~	9.60	9.60	564.20
3rd place, bronze medalist(s)	Finland	Olavi Rove	~~8.30~~	~~9.45~~	9.30	9.35	~~8.60~~	~~9.15~~	~~8.15~~	9.50	9.40	9.45	~~9.40~~	~~9.40~~	564.20
3rd place, bronze medalist(s)	Finland	Heikki Savolainen	~~7.60~~	~~9.45~~	9.40	9.45	9.55	9.50	~~8.75~~	~~9.10~~	~~9.00~~	9.20	9.75	9.70	564.20
3rd place, bronze medalist(s)	Finland	Kalevi Viskari	~~8.05~~	~~9.45~~	~~8.30~~	~~9.20~~	9.10	9.40	9.45	9.25	9.45	~~9.00~~	9.60	9.55	564.20
3rd place, bronze medalist(s)	Finland	Total	46.20	47.65	46.45	47.60	46.30	47.20	46.45	46.45	46.75	47.05	48.25	47.85	564.20
4	Germany	Helmut Bantz	8.95	9.25	9.35	9.60	9.40	9.55	9.40	9.40	9.60	9.50	9.65	9.60	561.20
4	Germany	Adalbert Dickhut	8.90	9.50	9.05	9.35	9.60	~~9.15~~	9.40	9.45	~~9.40~~	9.45	~~7.95~~	9.65	561.20
4	Germany	Jakob Kiefer	8.75	–	~~8.70~~	~~9.20~~	9.45	9.45	~~9.00~~	–	9.45	~~9.20~~	9.45	~~9.05~~	561.20
4	Germany	Friedel Overwien	~~7.70~~	~~8.80~~	9.10	~~9.30~~	9.55	9.25	9.10	~~9.30~~	~~9.35~~	~~9.10~~	~~9.35~~	~~8.75~~	561.20
4	Germany	Hans Pfann	8.50	9.10	9.40	9.50	~~9.40~~	9.25	~~9.00~~	~~9.10~~	9.45	~~9.30~~	9.60	~~8.60~~	561.20
4	Germany	Alfred Schwarzmann	8.60	8.90	9.00	~~9.25~~	~~9.20~~	~~8.40~~	9.30	9.50	9.55	9.45	9.70	9.80	561.20
4	Germany	Erich Wied	~~8.35~~	~~8.90~~	~~9.00~~	9.35	~~8.80~~	9.25	~~8.95~~	9.40	~~9.30~~	9.35	9.60	9.45	561.20
4	Germany	Theo Wied	~~8.50~~	9.05	~~9.00~~	9.40	9.50	~~8.70~~	9.45	9.50	9.45	9.55	~~9.45~~	9.15	561.20
4	Germany	Total	43.70	45.80	45.90	47.20	47.50	46.75	46.65	47.25	47.50	47.30	48.00	47.65	561.20
5	Japan	Akitomo Kaneko	9.30	9.25	9.40	9.45	9.35	7.90	9.25	9.30	9.50	9.70	9.50	9.40	556.90
5	Japan	Tetsumi Nabeya	9.30	9.45	8.70	9.30	8.20	9.00	9.35	9.30	9.40	9.20	9.30	9.60	556.90
5	Japan	Takashi Ono	9.40	9.65	8.95	9.20	9.40	9.00	9.50	9.60	9.45	9.15	9.45	9.45	556.90
5	Japan	Masao Takemoto	9.20	9.65	9.40	9.80	8.90	8.65	9.55	9.60	9.10	8.85	9.35	9.60	556.90
5	Japan	Tadao Uesako	9.55	9.60	9.00	9.35	9.15	8.85	9.55	9.55	9.20	9.30	9.05	9.50	556.90
5	Japan	Total	46.75	47.60	45.45	47.10	45.00	43.40	47.20	47.35	46.65	46.20	46.65	47.55	556.90
6	Hungary	József Fekete	9.20	9.30	8.95	9.40	9.55	9.45	9.20	9.30	9.15	~~8.70~~	~~8.65~~	~~8.05~~	555.80
6	Hungary	Ferenc Kemény	~~8.10~~	~~8.90~~	9.45	9.70	9.35	~~8.95~~	9.20	~~8.90~~	~~8.75~~	9.00	9.05	9.05	555.80
6	Hungary	Károly Kocsis	9.00	~~9.20~~	9.15	9.35	9.45	9.10	9.10	~~8.95~~	9.30	~~8.50~~	9.25	~~8.30~~	555.80
6	Hungary	János Mogyorósi-Klencs	~~8.55~~	9.40	~~8.95~~	~~9.35~~	~~7.40~~	9.00	9.40	9.45	~~9.10~~	~~8.50~~	~~9.00~~	8.70	555.80
6	Hungary	Ferenc Pataki	9.15	9.60	9.10	9.50	9.35	~~8.40~~	9.30	9.40	9.40	9.05	9.40	9.25	555.80
6	Hungary	Sándor Réthy	9.20	9.25	~~8.60~~	~~9.20~~	9.55	9.15	~~9.10~~	~~9.10~~	~~8.60~~	8.80	~~8.65~~	~~8.55~~	555.80
6	Hungary	Lajos Sántha	9.30	9.40	9.20	9.45	~~9.25~~	9.35	~~8.95~~	9.20	9.45	9.15	9.40	9.40	555.80
6	Hungary	Lajos Tóth	~~8.60~~	~~9.15~~	~~8.25~~	~~9.10~~	~~8.20~~	~~9.00~~	~~9.05~~	9.25	9.30	9.10	9.15	9.30	555.80
6	Hungary	Total	45.85	46.95	45.85	47.40	47.25	46.05	46.20	46.60	46.60	45.10	46.25	45.70	555.80
7	Czechoslovakia	Ferdinand Daniš	9.40	9.50	9.45	9.40	9.55	8.70	9.35	9.45	9.70	9.60	9.10	8.80	555.55
7	Czechoslovakia	Vladimír Kejř	8.95	9.30	9.40	9.40	~~8.60~~	8.85	~~9.00~~	9.20	9.20	~~8.55~~	~~8.80~~	8.90	555.55
7	Czechoslovakia	Miloš Kolejka	~~8.15~~	~~9.25~~	~~8.45~~	9.40	~~9.25~~	~~8.50~~	~~8.85~~	9.20	~~9.20~~	~~8.70~~	9.15	~~8.60~~	555.55
7	Czechoslovakia	Jindřich Mikulec	9.20	9.35	~~9.25~~	~~8.95~~	~~8.80~~	~~8.65~~	9.10	~~8.95~~	9.35	9.30	9.20	8.85	555.55
7	Czechoslovakia	Zdeněk Růžička	9.00	9.35	9.45	9.50	9.45	9.35	~~9.05~~	~~9.00~~	~~9.05~~	8.90	~~8.95~~	9.35	555.55
7	Czechoslovakia	Josef Škvor	~~8.90~~	~~8.95~~	9.40	~~9.35~~	9.30	9.30	9.20	~~9.15~~	~~9.20~~	9.40	9.15	~~7.80~~	555.55
7	Czechoslovakia	Leo Sotorník	~~8.80~~	~~9.25~~	~~9.20~~	~~9.25~~	9.30	9.15	9.35	9.50	9.35	~~8.75~~	~~9.05~~	~~8.55~~	555.55
7	Czechoslovakia	Josef Svoboda	9.10	9.30	9.30	9.45	9.30	~~8.55~~	9.15	9.35	9.25	9.15	9.35	8.80	555.55
7	Czechoslovakia	Total	45.65	46.80	47.00	47.15	46.90	45.35	46.15	46.70	46.85	46.35	45.95	44.70	555.55
8	United States	Jack Beckner	8.15	9.25	~~7.10~~	8.00	~~8.40~~	~~8.60~~	9.25	~~8.80~~	~~8.85~~	9.00	9.10	8.90	543.15
8	United States	Walter Blattmann	~~7.80~~	~~8.50~~	8.20	~~7.70~~	8.90	~~8.60~~	9.25	9.10	9.10	~~8.50~~	~~8.25~~	~~8.45~~	543.15
8	United States	Vincent D'Autorio	~~8.00~~	9.20	~~7.85~~	~~7.35~~	8.85	9.05	~~7.10~~	9.15	~~9.00~~	8.90	~~8.75~~	~~8.00~~	543.15
8	United States	Don Holder	8.00	~~8.20~~	8.70	8.20	9.10	9.20	9.20	~~8.80~~	9.05	~~8.00~~	~~9.05~~	~~8.00~~	543.15
8	United States	Bill Roetzheim	8.85	9.10	~~7.90~~	7.95	9.25	9.35	~~8.85~~	~~8.75~~	9.15	8.95	9.60	9.35	543.15
8	United States	Ed Scrobe	8.80	9.05	9.35	9.05	9.30	8.80	9.35	9.00	9.35	9.45	9.50	9.40	543.15
8	United States	Charles Simms	~~7.80~~	~~8.85~~	8.35	~~7.80~~	~~8.05~~	~~8.05~~	9.30	9.15	~~7.25~~	~~8.80~~	9.45	9.55	543.15
8	United States	Bob Stout	9.10	9.80	9.20	9.20	~~8.75~~	8.80	~~8.80~~	9.40	9.30	9.25	9.25	9.30	543.15
8	United States	Total	42.90	46.40	43.80	42.40	45.40	45.20	46.35	45.80	45.95	45.55	46.90	46.50	543.15
9	Bulgaria	Mincho Todorov	9.30	9.30	9.35	9.10	8.95	8.50	9.15	9.20	9.00	8.95	9.30	9.05	540.90
9	Bulgaria	Vasil Konstantinov	~~8.30~~	9.05	9.15	9.50	~~8.50~~	9.10	9.00	~~8.85~~	~~8.95~~	8.95	8.55	8.35	540.90
9	Bulgaria	Dimitar Yordanov	8.60	8.65	9.20	9.25	~~7.00~~	8.55	9.05	9.05	~~8.90~~	9.15	9.10	9.15	540.90
9	Bulgaria	Nikolay Milev	~~8.60~~	~~8.15~~	~~9.10~~	9.15	9.40	8.80	~~7.65~~	9.05	9.15	8.75	9.05	~~7.00~~	540.90
9	Bulgaria	Todor Todorov	9.30	8.75	~~8.80~~	~~8.65~~	~~7.70~~	~~8.20~~	9.05	~~9.00~~	9.00	9.20	~~8.40~~	~~7.15~~	540.90
9	Bulgaria	Nikolay Atanasov	~~7.00~~	~~8.25~~	~~9.15~~	~~8.80~~	8.95	8.30	~~8.85~~	9.05	~~8.65~~	~~8.30~~	~~8.20~~	8.45	540.90
9	Bulgaria	Iliya Topalov	9.10	8.80	9.30	9.20	9.15	~~6.00~~	~~6.60~~	9.05	9.25	~~6.50~~	~~6.90~~	~~4.50~~	540.90
9	Bulgaria	Stoyan Stoyanov	8.95	–	9.40	–	9.15	–	9.20	–	9.15	–	9.60	7.65	540.90
9	Bulgaria	Total	45.25	44.55	46.40	46.20	45.60	43.25	45.45	45.40	45.55	45.00	45.60	42.65	540.90
10	Italy	Fabio Bonacina	~~7.90~~	~~8.30~~	9.15	9.00	9.20	~~8.50~~	~~8.35~~	9.00	9.00	~~8.70~~	8.95	~~6.90~~	537.55
10	Italy	Silvio Brivio	~~6.20~~	~~7.30~~	8.70	~~8.95~~	9.05	8.70	~~8.50~~	~~7.35~~	~~8.75~~	8.90	8.95	8.25	537.55
10	Italy	Arrigo Carnoli	8.90	9.30	~~7.65~~	~~8.60~~	~~8.40~~	~~8.00~~	8.80	9.00	~~7.50~~	~~8.30~~	~~8.10~~	8.75	537.55
10	Italy	Guido Figone	9.25	9.40	9.45	9.10	9.40	8.80	8.70	~~8.25~~	9.20	9.35	9.05	8.90	537.55
10	Italy	Orlando Polmonari	8.40	8.35	8.85	~~8.90~~	9.00	~~8.50~~	9.05	9.20	8.90	~~8.70~~	8.20	~~7.55~~	537.55
10	Italy	Littorio Sampieri	8.80	8.95	9.25	9.20	~~8.60~~	8.85	9.15	9.25	9.00	9.35	8.30	~~7.75~~	537.55
10	Italy	Quinto Vadi	~~7.40~~	~~7.85~~	~~7.85~~	9.00	~~8.90~~	8.85	~~8.30~~	~~8.90~~	~~8.50~~	8.95	~~6.00~~	8.70	537.55
10	Italy	Luigi Zanetti	8.40	9.15	~~7.95~~	9.00	9.35	8.70	9.15	9.15	9.00	8.75	~~7.80~~	9.15	537.55
10	Italy	Total	43.75	45.15	45.40	45.30	46.00	43.90	44.85	45.60	45.10	45.30	43.45	43.75	537.55
11	Austria	Friedrich Fetz	8.20	~~8.00~~	~~7.55~~	~~7.75~~	~~5.25~~	~~7.00~~	~~9.10~~	~~8.60~~	~~8.40~~	–	~~7.80~~	8.45	535.40
11	Austria	Hans Friedrich	~~6.10~~	–	7.75	–	9.35	8.20	9.25	9.00	9.25	8.95	~~4.00~~	–	535.40
11	Austria	Wolfgang Girardi	8.15	8.60	8.10	9.05	~~7.55~~	~~7.70~~	9.45	9.40	9.15	9.15	9.10	9.10	535.40
11	Austria	Paul Grubenthal	~~7.25~~	9.10	~~5.50~~	8.60	~~8.15~~	~~7.25~~	9.25	9.15	~~9.10~~	~~8.50~~	9.00	8.65	535.40
11	Austria	Franz Kemter	~~7.00~~	~~7.90~~	~~7.20~~	8.35	9.05	8.90	~~8.90~~	~~8.50~~	9.20	~~8.70~~	8.95	~~8.25~~	535.40
11	Austria	Hans Sauter	8.60	9.00	9.30	9.30	9.60	9.55	9.20	9.15	9.40	9.35	9.30	9.40	535.40
11	Austria	Willi Welt	8.35	8.05	7.70	~~8.20~~	8.25	8.85	9.20	9.25	9.35	9.10	8.75	~~6.95~~	535.40
11	Austria	Ernst Wister	8.70	9.35	8.80	9.05	8.70	8.50	~~9.10~~	~~8.50~~	~~9.05~~	9.20	~~8.60~~	9.25	535.40
11	Austria	Total	42.00	44.10	41.65	44.35	44.95	44.00	46.35	45.95	46.35	45.75	45.10	44.85	535.40
12	France	Raymond Badin	~~6.90~~	8.75	8.75	9.05	8.50	9.35	~~7.55~~	8.85	9.20	8.90	7.55	9.00	534.90
12	France	René Changeat	9.20	9.65	~~4.75~~	~~8.45~~	7.90	~~8.00~~	9.25	9.20	~~8.90~~	8.95	8.60	8.85	534.90
12	France	Marcel de Wolf	8.30	~~7.95~~	~~7.70~~	~~8.20~~	~~7.90~~	~~8.55~~	~~8.40~~	~~8.85~~	~~8.10~~	~~7.00~~	~~6.50~~	~~6.40~~	534.90
12	France	Raymond Dot	~~8.10~~	9.45	9.30	9.40	~~4.75~~	8.95	9.30	9.35	9.30	9.10	9.05	9.30	534.90
12	France	Georges Floquet	~~7.70~~	~~8.20~~	7.85	~~8.15~~	9.00	8.95	~~8.25~~	8.95	~~9.15~~	~~8.30~~	~~7.35~~	~~8.55~~	534.90
12	France	Jean Guillou	8.40	~~8.70~~	~~7.25~~	8.60	~~7.50~~	~~7.95~~	8.90	~~8.00~~	9.35	8.95	8.45	~~8.00~~	534.90
12	France	Michel Mathiot	8.40	9.15	8.90	8.60	9.15	9.15	9.05	9.30	9.35	9.20	8.95	9.30	534.90
12	France	André Weingand	8.20	8.90	8.00	8.85	8.85	8.75	8.95	~~8.85~~	9.20	~~8.90~~	~~6.50~~	9.00	534.90
12	France	Total	42.50	45.90	42.80	44.50	43.40	45.15	45.45	45.65	46.40	45.10	42.60	45.45	534.90
13	Poland	Paweł Gaca	8.75	~~8.55~~	~~2.00~~	8.35	8.80	9.00	8.95	9.25	8.90	9.00	9.05	8.70	529.10
13	Poland	Paweł Gawron	~~8.50~~	~~8.10~~	8.70	~~8.00~~	8.95	8.75	~~8.00~~	~~5.50~~	8.85	9.00	9.05	8.40	529.10
13	Poland	Jerzy Jokiel	9.55	9.60	~~8.00~~	~~8.00~~	~~7.30~~	~~5.50~~	9.15	~~7.50~~	~~8.50~~	~~8.60~~	9.00	8.30	529.10
13	Poland	Ryszard Kucjas	~~8.75~~	~~8.55~~	9.00	8.35	~~6.50~~	~~6.80~~	~~8.35~~	9.00	~~8.40~~	~~8.80~~	~~8.25~~	8.10	529.10
13	Poland	Zdzisław Lesiński	~~8.20~~	8.70	9.35	8.95	8.50	~~7.55~~	9.10	8.25	~~6.00~~	8.85	8.80	~~7.30~~	529.10
13	Poland	Szymon Sobala	9.10	8.80	9.15	8.85	9.40	8.50	9.15	8.00	9.20	8.95	8.80	9.05	529.10
13	Poland	Jerzy Solarz	9.45	8.85	~~6.95~~	~~8.35~~	~~7.80~~	7.90	8.80	~~7.25~~	8.80	~~8.65~~	~~3.25~~	~~6.25~~	529.10
13	Poland	Paweł Świętek	8.85	8.85	9.20	8.70	8.05	8.45	~~8.45~~	7.50	8.80	8.95	~~8.20~~	~~6.90~~	529.10
13	Poland	Total	45.70	44.80	45.40	43.20	43.70	42.60	45.15	42.70	44.55	44.75	44.70	42.55	529.10
14	Norway	Mathias Jamtvedt	8.75	9.05	~~8.75~~	8.70	7.70	7.55	9.25	9.30	8.85	8.80	8.90	~~8.50~~	525.30
14	Norway	Georg Johansen	8.90	9.25	8.80	8.95	~~5.85~~	7.90	9.30	9.10	~~8.65~~	8.60	8.90	~~7.85~~	525.30
14	Norway	Magne Kleiven	~~7.80~~	~~8.30~~	8.80	9.00	8.35	8.05	~~8.70~~	~~8.70~~	~~7.90~~	~~7.70~~	~~6.50~~	8.70	525.30
14	Norway	Arne Knudsen	8.90	9.10	~~8.75~~	~~8.35~~	7.90	~~7.40~~	~~9.10~~	9.00	9.10	~~7.70~~	8.40	8.60	525.30
14	Norway	Odd Lie	8.45	8.95	8.95	8.85	8.80	~~5.90~~	9.25	9.10	~~8.60~~	8.05	~~7.00~~	~~8.10~~	525.30
14	Norway	Ernst Madland	~~8.05~~	~~8.75~~	~~8.20~~	~~8.65~~	~~7.05~~	8.25	~~8.65~~	~~8.25~~	8.75	~~8.00~~	~~2.90~~	8.85	525.30
14	Norway	Alf Nørgaard	~~7.90~~	~~8.35~~	9.00	8.90	8.70	7.50	9.20	9.10	8.80	8.45	8.55	8.70	525.30
14	Norway	Alf Olsen	8.50	9.15	8.80	~~8.60~~	~~7.25~~	~~6.90~~	9.25	~~8.90~~	9.10	9.05	8.85	9.00	525.30
14	Norway	Total	43.50	45.50	44.35	44.40	41.45	39.25	46.25	45.60	44.60	42.95	43.60	43.85	525.30
15	Denmark	Freddy Jensen	8.40	9.15	8.90	9.25	8.50	9.10	~~7.80~~	9.00	~~7.55~~	8.90	~~8.70~~	9.05	524.70
15	Denmark	Poul Jessen	8.85	9.05	~~8.35~~	9.15	8.90	9.10	9.30	9.05	8.85	7.80	8.80	8.80	524.70
15	Denmark	Bjarne Jørgensen	~~7.60~~	~~8.40~~	8.50	8.95	~~7.20~~	~~6.90~~	9.05	8.95	8.85	7.95	9.25	8.65	524.70
15	Denmark	Børge Minerth	8.15	8.60	9.05	9.20	7.90	7.55	9.10	~~7.75~~	~~7.10~~	~~5.45~~	8.85	~~8.40~~	524.70
15	Denmark	Børge Nielsen	8.05	8.80	8.95	9.05	8.30	7.20	~~8.70~~	8.90	8.70	8.40	8.75	8.40	524.70
15	Denmark	Gunnar Pedersen	~~7.00~~	~~8.10~~	~~7.75~~	~~8.40~~	~~7.75~~	~~7.00~~	9.10	~~8.85~~	8.75	~~6.50~~	~~8.40~~	~~8.25~~	524.70
15	Denmark	Volmer Thomsen	8.60	8.85	8.90	~~8.90~~	8.80	8.70	9.30	9.10	9.00	8.25	8.80	8.60	524.70
15	Denmark	Total	42.05	44.45	44.30	45.60	42.40	41.65	45.85	45.00	44.15	41.30	44.45	43.50	524.70
16	Egypt	Ahmed Issam Allam	~~7.80~~	8.65	8.90	9.15	~~3.50~~	~~4.75~~	9.35	9.40	9.10	8.90	8.75	8.95	514.90
16	Egypt	Ahmed Khalil El-Giddawi	8.25	~~7.70~~	7.70	7.70	6.25	~~7.45~~	~~8.55~~	8.95	~~8.20~~	8.20	7.70	8.50	514.90
16	Egypt	Magdy Gheriani	8.45	8.60	8.60	8.90	~~3.00~~	7.55	8.95	9.10	8.90	8.85	~~6.40~~	8.25	514.90
16	Egypt	Mohamed Sayed Hamdi	~~7.20~~	~~7.25~~	~~6.90~~	~~7.65~~	5.50	7.85	~~7.75~~	~~8.70~~	8.65	~~5.00~~	8.10	~~8.15~~	514.90
16	Egypt	Mahmoud Mohamed Reda	8.40	8.50	~~4.00~~	~~7.00~~	8.10	8.00	~~7.50~~	~~8.80~~	~~6.50~~	~~3.00~~	~~0.50~~	–	514.90
16	Egypt	Mahmoud Safwat	8.35	8.75	7.80	8.85	~~4.50~~	~~6.65~~	9.10	9.50	~~8.45~~	~~7.35~~	9.25	9.10	514.90
16	Egypt	Ragai Youssef	~~5.50~~	~~7.75~~	~~5.90~~	~~7.10~~	8.35	8.40	8.75	~~8.65~~	8.55	7.90	~~7.10~~	~~6.75~~	514.90
16	Egypt	Ali Zaky	8.25	9.25	9.45	9.70	8.85	8.90	9.45	9.00	9.40	9.40	7.65	9.30	514.90
16	Egypt	Total	41.70	43.75	42.45	44.30	37.05	40.70	45.60	45.95	44.60	43.25	41.45	0.50	514.90
17	Sweden	Arne Carlsson	8.75	9.35	6.70	7.60	7.95	6.15	9.30	9.10	9.00	9.00	8.45	8.65	514.20
17	Sweden	Anders Lindh	9.35	9.60	8.45	8.95	~~6.15~~	6.45	9.40	9.40	9.00	9.00	8.80	8.60	514.20
17	Sweden	Erich Peters	~~6.80~~	~~0.00~~	6.85	8.10	8.25	8.50	~~6.65~~	~~8.75~~	~~8.90~~	9.00	~~6.60~~	8.60	514.20
17	Sweden	Nils Sjöberg	~~8.25~~	~~9.05~~	~~6.15~~	~~7.10~~	6.35	7.00	~~9.10~~	8.80	~~8.85~~	~~8.75~~	8.90	8.55	514.20
17	Sweden	Börje Stattin	8.30	9.35	7.00	8.75	9.00	~~1.00~~	9.25	8.80	9.30	9.05	9.20	9.40	514.20
17	Sweden	William Thoresson	9.45	9.80	7.25	7.65	~~5.75~~	~~6.00~~	9.10	~~8.70~~	9.15	9.00	9.30	~~7.20~~	514.20
17	Sweden	Kurt Wigartz	8.80	9.20	~~6.50~~	~~7.10~~	8.25	6.80	9.20	9.00	8.95	~~8.30~~	~~8.00~~	~~8.35~~	514.20
17	Sweden	Total	44.65	47.30	36.25	41.05	39.80	34.90	46.25	45.10	45.40	45.05	44.65	43.80	514.20
18	Luxembourg	Marcel Coppin	8.20	7.95	7.50	8.20	7.30	6.40	9.10	9.25	8.65	~~7.40~~	8.30	7.80	503.25
18	Luxembourg	Hubert Erang	8.15	8.55	~~7.10~~	~~8.10~~	7.80	6.00	8.90	9.25	8.40	7.45	8.20	~~7.80~~	503.25
18	Luxembourg	Armand Huberty	8.30	7.85	7.75	8.35	8.65	7.65	8.35	~~8.50~~	8.90	8.80	8.65	9.00	503.25
18	Luxembourg	Jey Kugeler	~~7.30~~	~~6.90~~	8.40	8.75	6.00	8.20	8.60	9.10	8.85	8.80	~~7.80~~	8.50	503.25
18	Luxembourg	René Schroeder	7.90	7.30	7.85	8.55	~~4.75~~	~~3.50~~	~~7.70~~	8.75	~~7.90~~	7.55	7.85	8.35	503.25
18	Luxembourg	Josy Stoffel	8.95	8.90	9.35	9.35	9.30	8.80	9.30	9.25	9.40	9.30	9.35	9.10	503.25
18	Luxembourg	Total	41.50	40.55	40.85	43.20	39.05	37.05	44.25	45.60	44.20	41.90	42.35	42.75	503.25
19	Yugoslavia	Ivan Čaklec	8.20	8.60	~~6.00~~	7.90	~~5.10~~	8.50	9.55	9.15	8.65	8.40	7.25	~~6.65~~	503.00
19	Yugoslavia	Dušan Furlan	8.55	8.05	7.80	8.60	8.35	7.85	9.40	9.15	9.00	8.60	8.45	8.90	503.00
19	Yugoslavia	Karel Janež	–	7.75	~~5.85~~	~~7.20~~	~~6.30~~	8.35	~~7.10~~	~~8.95~~	~~7.85~~	8.60	~~6.50~~	~~6.60~~	503.00
19	Yugoslavia	Ivica Jelić	~~6.30~~	~~7.70~~	7.95	7.95	7.65	7.40	8.40	9.10	~~8.40~~	~~8.15~~	7.20	8.10	503.00
19	Yugoslavia	Franjo Jurjević	7.40	8.25	~~6.80~~	8.45	~~5.00~~	~~5.80~~	9.40	9.25	9.00	~~8.00~~	~~6.15~~	8.60	503.00
19	Yugoslavia	Antun Kropivšek	~~7.30~~	–	8.05	~~7.85~~	7.85	7.85	~~8.40~~	–	8.65	~~8.25~~	9.20	9.05	503.00
19	Yugoslavia	Ede Mađar	8.85	8.60	8.05	~~7.50~~	6.50	~~7.25~~	~~8.20~~	9.00	~~8.05~~	8.35	7.45	7.50	503.00
19	Yugoslavia	Sreten Stefanović	8.30	~~7.50~~	8.85	9.20	7.85	~~5.50~~	9.20	~~7.50~~	8.55	8.40	~~6.90~~	~~6.90~~	503.00
19	Yugoslavia	Total	41.30	41.25	40.70	42.10	38.20	39.95	45.95	45.65	43.85	42.35	39.55	42.15	503.00
20	Romania	Eugen Balint	8.15	~~8.30~~	8.25	~~7.75~~	6.50	7.50	~~6.00~~	~~8.95~~	~~7.55~~	8.40	~~4.50~~	6.75	499.85
20	Romania	Zoltan Balogh	~~7.80~~	~~8.20~~	~~7.85~~	8.95	~~6.50~~	~~7.25~~	~~7.55~~	9.10	7.90	~~7.90~~	~~1.25~~	~~5.50~~	499.85
20	Romania	Carol Bedö	8.85	9.05	~~6.80~~	~~7.90~~	6.85	7.75	8.55	~~8.95~~	7.70	~~7.55~~	~~1.75~~	~~5.50~~	499.85
20	Romania	Mihai Botez	~~7.80~~	8.65	9.15	9.35	7.75	8.50	~~6.50~~	9.00	8.90	8.95	5.50	8.15	499.85
20	Romania	Francisc Cociş	8.20	8.60	8.10	~~8.55~~	~~5.25~~	~~6.80~~	8.50	~~8.85~~	~~6.25~~	8.20	4.50	7.00	499.85
20	Romania	Andrei Kerekeş	8.75	8.95	9.00	9.30	9.00	8.80	8.45	9.15	8.95	~~7.65~~	8.30	8.65	499.85
20	Romania	Aurel Loşniţă	~~7.00~~	~~8.20~~	~~7.80~~	8.90	~~4.75~~	~~4.50~~	8.45	9.10	~~7.00~~	8.50	5.30	~~6.10~~	499.85
20	Romania	Frederic Orendi	8.75	8.45	8.50	8.95	8.80	8.00	8.40	9.00	9.05	8.95	9.25	8.95	499.85
20	Romania	Total	42.70	43.70	43.00	45.45	38.90	40.55	42.35	45.35	42.50	43.00	32.85	39.50	499.85
21	Great Britain	Ken Buffin	7.20	7.20	8.70	8.75	8.50	7.75	9.00	~~7.90~~	8.85	7.50	9.45	8.35	490.50
21	Great Britain	Graham Harcourt	7.90	7.00	8.45	~~7.10~~	6.85	~~4.50~~	8.55	8.10	8.70	7.25	7.80	6.45	490.50
21	Great Britain	Peter Starling	~~6.50~~	~~7.00~~	8.35	7.65	~~6.10~~	6.30	~~8.35~~	8.50	7.05	~~6.50~~	~~7.00~~	7.00	490.50
21	Great Britain	Frank Turner	7.75	7.90	9.15	9.05	9.05	9.00	9.20	9.05	9.10	8.65	8.25	8.55	490.50
21	Great Britain	George Weedon	6.70	7.50	~~8.30~~	8.45	7.45	7.60	8.35	9.00	~~6.15~~	7.75	8.20	~~5.90~~	490.50
21	Great Britain	Jack Whitford	8.25	7.25	8.95	8.65	9.05	8.50	9.05	8.65	9.10	8.55	7.25	8.40	490.50
21	Great Britain	Total	37.80	36.85	43.60	42.55	40.90	39.15	44.15	43.30	42.80	39.70	40.95	38.75	490.50
22	Saar	Norbert Dietrich	~~6.00~~	7.85	8.90	8.55	~~7.50~~	~~5.65~~	6.90	~~7.00~~	8.20	7.65	8.85	7.10	481.80
22	Saar	Rolf Lauer	7.55	8.35	7.40	~~7.25~~	8.05	6.25	8.15	8.05	7.70	7.70	8.35	~~6.90~~	481.80
22	Saar	Walter Müller	7.05	~~7.75~~	7.55	7.90	7.60	6.00	8.60	8.75	8.40	7.80	9.05	7.75	481.80
22	Saar	Heinz Ostheimer	7.85	8.50	8.35	8.45	8.85	7.10	8.80	8.85	6.70	7.90	~~2.00~~	7.80	481.80
22	Saar	Arthur Schmitt	7.15	8.10	8.65	9.00	8.20	8.35	~~5.65~~	8.85	8.95	8.60	9.05	8.25	481.80
22	Saar	Fred Wiedersporn	8.35	7.80	~~5.40~~	7.35	7.85	7.50	8.65	8.75	~~6.60~~	~~6.30~~	8.00	7.25	481.80
22	Saar	Total	37.95	40.60	40.85	41.25	40.55	35.20	41.10	43.25	39.95	39.65	43.30	38.15	481.80
23	Portugal	Raúl Caldeira	7.65	8.65	3.50	~~7.60~~	5.70	5.75	6.50	8.05	6.95	6.30	7.80	8.35	428.65
23	Portugal	Manuel Cardoso	7.10	8.00	~~2.00~~	7.80	~~5.55~~	5.30	~~0.00~~	~~5.65~~	~~5.00~~	~~5.00~~	3.50	~~6.60~~	428.65
23	Portugal	Manuel Gouveia	7.40	8.95	7.65	8.35	6.80	~~4.85~~	9.00	8.65	6.70	8.25	8.25	8.50	428.65
23	Portugal	Joaquim Granger	7.35	8.10	8.00	9.05	6.05	5.25	6.25	7.00	8.45	7.80	7.65	7.55	428.65
23	Portugal	António Leite	7.80	~~7.70~~	7.15	8.00	6.10	6.75	5.25	6.00	7.00	5.75	~~3.00~~	7.25	428.65
23	Portugal	Manuel Prazeres	~~6.90~~	7.85	4.85	7.75	8.80	7.00	8.40	8.50	6.25	6.90	4.65	6.65	428.65
23	Portugal	Total	37.30	41.55	31.15	40.95	33.45	30.05	35.40	38.20	35.45	35.00	31.85	38.30	428.65
