= Sayed Hamdi =

Egyptian gymnast (1931–1992)

- محمد محمد سعيد حمدي
- Full name: Mohamed Mohamed Sayed Hamdi
- Born: 11 December 1931 Cairo, Kingdom of Egypt
- Died: 16 October 1992 (aged 60) Cairo, Egypt

Gymnastics career
- Discipline: Men's artistic gymnastics
- Country represented: United Arab Republic
- Former countries represented: Egypt
- Club: Zamalek SC
Medal record
Men's artistic gymnastics
Representing Egypt
Mediterranean Games
Bronze medal – third place	1955 Barcelona	Team
Representing United Arab Republic
Mediterranean Games
Gold medal – first place	1959 Beirut	Team

Mohamed Mohamed Sayed Hamdi (Arabic: محمد محمد سعيد حمدي; 11 December 1931 – 16 October 1992), known as Sayed Hamdi, was an Egyptian artistic gymnast and sports administrator. He represented Egypt in eight events at the 1952 Summer Olympics in Helsinki, and won a team bronze medal at the 1955 Mediterranean Games and a team gold medal at the 1959 Mediterranean Games.

== Career ==
Born in Cairo, Hamdi was a member of the Zamalek SC gymnastics team during the 1950s. In July 1952, he represented Egypt at the 1952 Summer Olympics in Helsinki alongside teammates Ali Zaky, Mahmoud Safwat, Ahmed Issam Allam, Magdy Gheriani, Ahmed El-Giddawi, Ragai Farhat, and Mahmoud Reda. Egypt placed 16th out of 23 nations in the men's team all-around with 514.90 points, while Hamdi finished 159th out of 185 competitors in the individual all-around with a total score of 88.70 points. His highest individual placement at the Games came on the horizontal bar, where he tied for 122nd place overall and ranked fourth among the eight Egyptian competitors.

At the 1955 Mediterranean Games in Barcelona, Hamdi won a bronze medal with the Egyptian team in the men's team all-around, finishing third with 328.85 points behind Italy (333.00) and France (332.40). At the 1959 Mediterranean Games in Beirut, competing for the United Arab Republic, he won a gold medal in the team all-around alongside teammates including Ahmed Ghonaim, Ismail Abdallah, and Faruq Selim.

Hamdi worked as an engineer and owned a firm in Cairo. After retiring from competition, he served for several years as president of the Cairo regional gymnastics federation. He died in Cairo on 16 October 1992 at the age of 60.

== Competitive history ==
International competitive results for Sayed Hamdi
Year	Competition	Venue	Representing	Event	Compulsory	Voluntary	Total	Rank
1952	Summer Olympics	Helsinki, Finland	Egypt	Team all-around	252.85	262.05	514.90	16
1952	Summer Olympics	Helsinki, Finland	Egypt	Individual all-around	44.10	44.60	88.70	159
1952	Summer Olympics	Helsinki, Finland	Egypt	Floor exercise	7.20	7.25	14.45	168
1952	Summer Olympics	Helsinki, Finland	Egypt	Rings	6.90	7.65	14.55	166
1952	Summer Olympics	Helsinki, Finland	Egypt	Pommel horse	5.50	7.85	13.35	=152
1952	Summer Olympics	Helsinki, Finland	Egypt	Horse vault	7.75	8.70	16.45	=156
1952	Summer Olympics	Helsinki, Finland	Egypt	Parallel bars	8.65	5.00	13.65	171
1952	Summer Olympics	Helsinki, Finland	Egypt	Horizontal bar	8.10	8.15	16.25	=122
1955	Mediterranean Games	Barcelona, Spain	Egypt	Team all-around	—		328.85	3rd place, bronze medalist(s)
1959	Mediterranean Games	Beirut, Lebanon	United Arab Republic	Team all-around	—			1st place, gold medalist(s)
