= Khushi Ram (gymnast) =

Indian gymnast (born 1916)

- Born: 15 January 1916 Gurdaspur, Punjab, British India

Gymnastics career
- Discipline: Men's artistic gymnastics
- Country represented: India

Khushi Ram (born 15 January 1916) was an Indian artistic gymnast. He competed at the 1952 Summer Olympics.

== Career ==
At 36 years old, Ram represented India at the 1952 Summer Olympics. Ram and Vir Singh were the first gymnasts to represent India at the Olympics. Ram finished last in the individual all-around out of the 185 competitors. Ram and Singh finished in the bottom five on all the apparatuses.
