= Ronnie Lombard =

South African gymnast

- Full name: Ronald Peter Lombard
- Born: 28 July 1928 South West Africa (present-day Namibia)

Gymnastics career
- Discipline: Men's artistic gymnastics
- Country represented: South Africa

Ronald Peter Lombard (born 28 July 1928) was a South African gymnast. He competed at the 1952 Summer Olympics and the 1956 Summer Olympics.
