= Jack Wells (gymnast) =

South African gymnast

- Full name: John Norman Wells
- Born: 3 October 1926 Bloemfontein, Union of South Africa
- Died: 2 April 2010 (aged 83) Cape Town, South Africa

Gymnastics career
- Discipline: Men's artistic gymnastics
- Country represented: South Africa

John Norman Wells (3 October 1926 – 2 April 2010) was a South African gymnast. He competed at the 1952 Summer Olympics and the 1956 Summer Olympics.
