= Mathias Jamtvedt =

Norwegian gymnast

- Full name: Mathias Jamtvedt, Jr.
- Born: 14 August 1922 Gjerpen Municipality, Norway
- Died: 15 October 2000 (aged 78) Skien, Norway

Gymnastics career
- Discipline: Men's artistic gymnastics
- Country represented: Norway
- Club: Odds Ballklubb

Mathias Jamtvedt Jr. (14 August 1922 – 15 October 2000) was a Norwegian gymnast. He competed in eight events at the 1952 Summer Olympics.
