= Arne Knudsen =

Norwegian gymnast

- Born: 24 May 1923 Drammen, Norway
- Died: 19 February 2010 (aged 86) Drammen, Norway

Gymnastics career
- Discipline: Men's artistic gymnastics
- Country represented: Norway
- Gym: Drammens TF

Arne Knudsen (24 May 1923 – 19 February 2010) was a Norwegian gymnast. He represented the club Drammens TF and competed at the 1952 Summer Olympics.
