= Miloš Kolejka =

Czech gymnast (1926–2020)

- Born: 18 October 1926 Němčice nad Hanou, Czechoslovakia
- Died: 30 October 2020 (aged 94) Mlékovice, Czech Republic

Gymnastics career
- Discipline: Men's artistic gymnastics
- Country represented: Czechoslovakia

Miloš Kolejka (18 October 1926 – 30 October 2020) was a Czech gymnast. He competed in eight events at the 1952 Summer Olympics.

He died on 30 October 2020.
