= Francisc Cociș =

Romanian gymnast

- Alternative name: Ferenc Kocsis
- Born: 19 May 1930 Giungi, Kingdom of Romania

Gymnastics career
- Discipline: Men's artistic gymnastics
- Country represented: Romania
- Club: Dinamo București

Francisc Cociș (born 19 May 1930) is a Romanian gymnast. He competed in eight events at the 1952 Summer Olympics.
