= Manuel Cardoso (gymnast) =

Portuguese gymnast (1928–1970)

- Full name: Manuel Filipe Carqueja Seara Cardoso
- Born: 17 June 1928 Porto, Portugal
- Died: 11 October 1970 (aged 42) Porto, Portugal

Gymnastics career
- Discipline: Men's artistic gymnastics
- Country represented: Portugal

Manuel Filipe Carqueja Seara Cardoso (17 June 1928 – 11 October 1970) was a Portuguese gymnast. He competed in eight events at the 1952 Summer Olympics.
