= Ernst Madland =

Norwegian gymnast

- Full name: Ernst Harry Madland
- Born: 21 February 1927 Stavanger, Norway
- Died: 16 November 1984 (aged 57) Stavanger, Norway

Gymnastics career
- Discipline: Men's artistic gymnastics
- Country represented: Norway
- Gym: Stavanger Turnforening

Ernst Harry Madland (21 February 1927 – 16 November 1984) was a Norwegian gymnast. He competed in eight events at the 1952 Summer Olympics.
