= Todor Todorov (gymnast) =

Bulgarian gymnast (1928–2022)

- Тодор Михайлов Тодоров
- Full name: Todor Mihaylov Todorov
- Born: 2 November 1928
- Died: 8 December 2022 (aged 94)

Gymnastics career
- Discipline: Men's artistic gymnastics
- Country represented: Bulgaria

Todor Mihaylov Todorov (Bulgarian: Тодор Михайлов Тодоров) (2 November 1928 – 8 December 2022) was a Bulgarian gymnast. He competed in eight events at the 1952 Summer Olympics. Todorov died on 8 December 2023, at the age of 94.
