= Josef Svoboda (gymnast) =

Czech gymnast

- Born: 9 October 1930 Brno, Czechoslovakia

Gymnastics career
- Discipline: Men's artistic gymnastics
- Country represented: Czechoslovakia

Josef Svoboda (born 9 October 1930) is a Czech gymnast. He competed in eight events at the 1952 Summer Olympics.
