= Eugen Balint =

Romanian gymnast (1927–2014)

- Alternative name: Jenő Bálint
- Born: 5 March 1927 Ineu, Kingdom of Romania
- Died: 19 December 2014 (aged 87) Arad, Romania

Gymnastics career
- Discipline: Men's artistic gymnastics
- Country represented: Romania
- Club: CS Dinamo București; Clubul Sportiv Astra Arad

Eugen Balint (5 March 1927 – 19 December 2014) was a Romanian gymnast. He competed in eight events at the 1952 Summer Olympics. Balint died in Arad, Romania on 19 December 2014, at the age of 87.
