= Walter Müller (German gymnast) =

German gymnast (1930–2021)

- Born: 31 December 1930 Neunkirchen, Territory of the Saar Basin
- Died: 21 May 2021 (aged 90) Neunkirchen, Germany

Gymnastics career
- Discipline: Men's artistic gymnastics
- Country represented: (Saar Protectorate) Saar
- Club: Turn- und Sportverein von 1860 Neunkirchen

Walter Müller (31 December 1930 – 21 May 2021) was a German gymnast. He competed in eight events at the 1952 Summer Olympics, representing Saar.

== See also ==
- Saar at the 1952 Summer Olympics
