= Aurel Loșniță =

Romanian gymnast (born 1927)

- Born: 2 November 1927

Gymnastics career
- Discipline: Men's artistic gymnastics
- Country represented: Romania
- Club: CS Dinamo București; Clubul Sportiv Astra Arad

Aurel Loșniță (born 2 November 1927) is a Romanian former gymnast. He competed in eight events at the 1952 Summer Olympics.
