= Andrei Kerekeș =

Romanian gymnast

- Alternative name: András Kerekes
- Born: 9 January 1925 Reșița, Kingdom of Romania
- Died: 3 January 1991 (aged 65) Reșița, Romania

Gymnastics career
- Discipline: Men's artistic gymnastics
- Country represented: Romania

Andrei Kerekeș (9 January 1925 – 3 January 1991) was a Romanian gymnast. He competed in eight events at the 1952 Summer Olympics.
