= Friedrich Fetz =

Austrian gymnast (1927–2013)

- Born: 2 November 1927 Schlins, Austria
- Died: 25 October 2013 (aged 85) Innsbruck, Austria

Gymnastics career
- Discipline: Men's artistic gymnastics
- Country represented: Austria

Friedrich Fetz (2 November 1927 – 25 October 2013) was an Austrian gymnast. He competed in eight events at the 1952 Summer Olympics, both in team events and individual apparatus categories. Austria placed 11th in the team standings.
