= Børge Nielsen (gymnast) =

Danish gymnast

- Full name: Børge Folmer Nielsen
- Born: 19 October 1924 Viborg, Denmark
- Died: December 2017 (aged 93)

Gymnastics career
- Discipline: Men's artistic gymnastics
- Country represented: Denmark

Børge Folmer Nielsen (19 October 1924 – December 2017) was a Danish gymnast. He competed in eight events at the 1952 Summer Olympics. Nielson died in December 2017.
