= Alf Olsen (gymnast) =

Norwegian gymnast

- Full name: Alf Einar Olsen
- Born: 4 November 1925 Stavanger, Norway
- Died: 24 February 2001 (aged 75) Stavanger, Norway

Gymnastics career
- Discipline: Men's artistic gymnastics
- Country represented: Norway
- Gym: Stavanger Turnforening

Alf Einar Olsen (4 November 1925 – 24 February 2001) was a Norwegian gymnast. He competed in eight events at the 1952 Summer Olympics.
