= Zoltan Balogh =

Romanian gymnast

- Born: 3 August 1930 Chișineu-Criș, Kingdom of Romania

Gymnastics career
- Discipline: Men's artistic gymnastics
- Country represented: Romania

Zoltan Balogh (born 3 August 1930) is a Romanian gymnast. He competed in eight events at the 1952 Summer Olympics.
