= Ryszard Kucjas =

Polish gymnast

- Born: 4 December 1922 Rybnik, Second Polish Republic
- Died: 22 November 1994 (aged 71) Hanover, Germany
- Height: 1.60 m (5 ft 3 in)

Gymnastics career
- Discipline: Men's artistic gymnastics
- Country represented: Poland
- Club: Górnik Radlin

Ryszard Kucjas (4 December 1922 – 22 November 1994) was a Polish gymnast. He competed in eight events at the 1952 Summer Olympics.
