= Vir Singh (gymnast) =

Indian gymnast

- Born: 8 July 1930 Gurdaspur, British India
- Died: 29 June 2006 (aged 75)

Gymnastics career
- Discipline: Men's artistic gymnastics
- Country represented: India

Vir Singh (8 July 1930 – 29 June 2006) was an Indian gymnast. He competed in seven events at the 1952 Summer Olympics.
