= Ferenc Kemény (gymnast) =

Hungarian gymnast

- Born: 15 June 1922 Nyíregyháza, Hungary
- Died: 16 May 2002 (aged 79) Győr, Hungary

Gymnastics career
- Discipline: Men's artistic gymnastics
- Country represented: Hungary
- Club: Budapesti Vörös Meteor Sport Klub

Ferenc Kemény (15 June 1922 – 16 May 2002) was a Hungarian gymnast. He competed in eight events at the 1952 Summer Olympics.
