= Szymon Sobala =

Polish gymnast

- Born: 15 January 1919 Piekary, Weimar Republic
- Died: 9 May 2009 (aged 90)
- Height: 1.73 m (5 ft 8 in)

Gymnastics career
- Discipline: Men's artistic gymnastics
- Country represented: Poland
- Club: Orzeł Brzeziny

Szymon Sobala (15 January 1919 – 9 May 2009) was a Polish gymnast. He competed in eight events at the 1952 Summer Olympics.
