= Wolfgang Girardi =

Austrian gymnast (1928–2018)

- Born: 19 April 1928
- Died: 28 March 2018 (aged 89)

Gymnastics career
- Discipline: Men's artistic gymnastics
- Country represented: Austria

Wolfgang Girardi (19 April 1928 – 28 March 2018) was an Austrian gymnast. He competed in eight events at the 1952 Summer Olympics.
