= Ede Mađar =

Serbian gymnast (1931–2005)

- Full name: Edvard Mađar
- Born: 28 July 1931 Subotica, Kingdom of Yugoslavia
- Died: 13 April 2005 (aged 73) Subotica, Serbia and Montenegro

Gymnastics career
- Discipline: Men's artistic gymnastics
- Country represented: (Socialist Federal Republic of Yugoslavia) Yugoslavia

Edvard Mađar (28 July 1931 – 13 April 2005) was a Serbian gymnast. He competed in eight events at the 1952 Summer Olympics.
