= Arne Carlsson (gymnast) =

Swedish gymnast

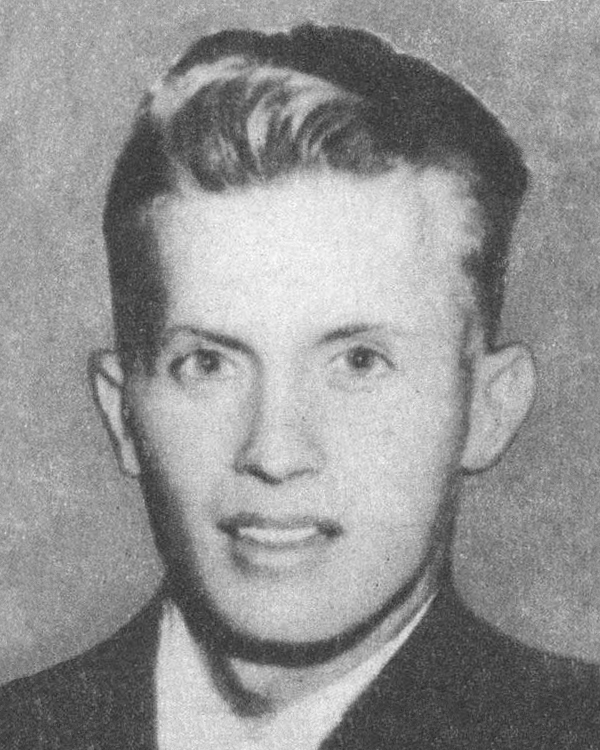
- Carlsson c. 1950s

Personal information
- Full name: Arne Hardy Carlsson
- Born: 13 July 1924 Örebro, Sweden
- Died: 10 February 2011 (aged 86) Järfälla, Sweden

Gymnastics career
- Discipline: Men's artistic gymnastics
- Country represented: Sweden
- Gym: Arbetarnas Gymnastikförening

Arne Hardy Carlsson (13 July 1924 – 10 February 2011) was a Swedish gymnast. He competed at the 1952 Summer Olympics in all artistic gymnastics events with the best individual result of 44th place on the vault.
