= Nikolay Milev =

Bulgarian gymnast (born 1930)

- Николай Климентов Милев
- Full name: Nikolay Klimentov Milev
- Born: 18 November 1930 Vidin, Bulgaria

Gymnastics career
- Discipline: Men's artistic gymnastics
- Country represented: Bulgaria

Nikolay Klimentov Milev (Bulgarian: Николай Климентов Милев) (born 18 November 1930) is a Bulgarian former gymnast. He competed in eight events at the 1952 Summer Olympics.
