= Friedel Overwien =

Germany gymnast

- Full name: Friedrich Josef Overwien
- Born: 27 September 1922 Essen, Weimar Republic
- Died: 10 July 2001 (aged 78) Essen, Germany

Gymnastics career
- Discipline: Men's artistic gymnastics
- Country represented: West Germany
- Gym: Turnvereinigung Steele 1863

Friedrich Josef "Friedel" Overwien (27 September 1922 – 10 July 2001) was a German gymnast. He competed in all artistic gymnastics events at the 1952 Summer Olympics, with his best result being 15th place on the pommel horse.
