= Franz Kemter =

Austrian gymnast (1922–2008)

- Born: 21 February 1922 Dornbirn, Austria
- Died: 28 February 2008 (aged 86) Dornbirn, Austria

Gymnastics career
- Discipline: Men's artistic gymnastics
- Country represented: Austria

Franz Kemter (21 February 1922 – 28 February 2008) was an Austrian gymnast. He competed in eight events at the 1952 Summer Olympics.
