= Gunnar Pedersen =

Danish gymnast (1924–1999)

- Full name: Gunnar Dakin Pedersen
- Born: 23 September 1924 Aarhus, Denmark
- Died: 31 July 1999 (aged 74) Lynge, Allerød Municipality, Denmark

Gymnastics career
- Discipline: Men's artistic gymnastics
- Country represented: Denmark

Gunnar Dakin Pedersen (23 September 1924 – 31 July 1999) was a Danish gymnast. He competed in eight events at the 1952 Summer Olympics.
