= Sándor Réthy =

Hungarian gymnast

- Full name: Sándor Kálmán Réthy
- Born: 15 November 1923 Debrecen, Hungary
- Died: 4 June 1998 (aged 74) Budapest, Hungary

Gymnastics career
- Discipline: Men's artistic gymnastics
- Country represented: Hungary
- Club: Budapesti Honvéd Sportegyesület

Sándor Kálmán Réthy (15 November 1923 – 4 June 1998) was a Hungarian gymnast. He competed in eight events at the 1952 Summer Olympics.
