= Franjo Jurjević =

Croatian gymnast (1932–2022)

- Born: 22 November 1932 Bjelovar, Yugoslavia
- Died: 24 December 2022 (aged 90) Zagreb, Croatia

Gymnastics career
- Discipline: Men's artistic gymnastics
- Country represented: (Socialist Federal Republic of Yugoslavia) Yugoslavia

Franjo Jurjević (22 November 1932 – 24 December 2022) was a Croatian gymnast. He competed in eight events at the 1952 Summer Olympics.

Jurjević died in Zagreb on 24 December 2022, at the age of 90.
