= Iliya Topalov =

Bulgarian gymnast (born 1926)

- Илия Атанасов Топалов
- Full name: Iliya Atanasov Topalov
- Born: 10 November 1926

Gymnastics career
- Discipline: Men's artistic gymnastics
- Country represented: Bulgaria

Iliya Atanasov Topalov (Bulgarian: Илия Атанасов Топалов) (born 10 November 1926) was a Bulgarian gymnast. He competed in eight events at the 1952 Summer Olympics.
