= Dimitar Yordanov (gymnast) =

Bulgarian gymnast (born 1928)

- Димитър Теодоров Йорданов
- Full name: Dimitar Teodorov Yordanov
- Born: 4 February 1928

Gymnastics career
- Discipline: Men's artistic gymnastics
- Country represented: Bulgaria

Dimitar Yordanov (Bulgarian: Димитър Теодоров Йорданов) (born 4 February 1928) is a Bulgarian gymnast. He competed in eight events at the 1952 Summer Olympics.
