= Dušan Furlan =

Slovenian gymnast (1929–2007)

- Born: 24 August 1929 Brezovica pri Ljubljani, Kingdom of Serbs, Croats and Slovenes
- Died: 9 June 2007 (aged 77) Nova Gorica, Slovenia

Gymnastics career
- Discipline: Men's artistic gymnastics
- Country represented: Yugoslavia

Dušan Furlan (24 August 1929 – 9 June 2007) was a Slovenian gymnast. He competed in eight events at the 1952 Summer Olympics.
