= Marcel Coppin =

Luxembourgish gymnast (1928–2008)

- Born: 27 April 1928 Paris, France
- Died: 17 September 2008 (aged 80) Luxembourg City, Luxembourg
- Height: 1.78 m (5 ft 10 in)

Gymnastics career
- Discipline: Men's artistic gymnastics
- Country represented: Luxembourg

Marcel Coppin (27 April 1928 – 17 September 2008) was a Luxembourgish gymnast. He competed at the 1952 Summer Olympics and the 1960 Summer Olympics.
