= Raúl Caldeira =

Portuguese gymnast (1927–2020)

- Full name: Raúl Júlio de Almeida Pimenta Marques Caldeira
- Born: 21 January 1927
- Died: 7 December 2020 (aged 93) Lisbon, Portugal

Gymnastics career
- Discipline: Men's artistic gymnastics
- Country represented: Portugal
- Club: Lisboa Ginásio Clube

Raúl Júlio de Almeida Pimenta Marques Caldeira (21 January 1927 – 7 December 2020) was a Portuguese gymnast. He competed in eight events at the 1952 Summer Olympics.
