= Manuel Prazeres =

Portuguese gymnast (born 1927)

- Full name: Manuel José Prazeres
- Born: 1 December 1927

Gymnastics career
- Discipline: Men's artistic gymnastics
- Country represented: Portugal
- Club: Lisboa Ginásio Clube

Manuel José Prazeres (born 1 December 1927) was a Portuguese gymnast. He competed in eight events at the 1952 Summer Olympics.
