= Paweł Świętek =

Polish gymnast

- Full name: Paweł Jan Świętek
- Born: 28 October 1924 Piekary, Second Polish Republic
- Died: 16 February 1989 (aged 64) Piekary, Polish People's Republic
- Height: 1.60 m (5 ft 3 in)

Gymnastics career
- Discipline: Men's artistic gymnastics
- Country represented: Poland
- Club: Klub Sportowy Baildon Katowice

Paweł Jan Świętek (28 October 1924 – 16 February 1989) was a Polish gymnast. He competed in eight events at the 1952 Summer Olympics.
