= Alf Nørgaard =

Norwegian gymnast

- Born: 30 October 1916 Sauda Municipality, Norway
- Died: 15 September 1971 (aged 54) Sauda Municipality, Norway

Gymnastics career
- Discipline: Men's artistic gymnastics
- Country represented: Norway
- Gym: Sauda Idrettsforening

Alf Nørgaard (30 October 1916 – 15 September 1971) was a Norwegian gymnast. He competed in eight events at the 1952 Summer Olympics.
