= Paul Grubenthal =

Austrian gymnast (1932–1995)

- Alternative name: Hans Grubenthal
- Born: 5 August 1932
- Died: 30 March 1995 (aged 62)

Gymnastics career
- Discipline: Men's artistic gymnastics
- Country represented: Austria

Paul Grubenthal (5 August 1932 – 30 March 1995) was an Austrian gymnast. He competed in eight events at the 1952 Summer Olympics.
