= Bjarne Jørgensen =

Danish gymnast (born 1933)

- Born: 13 May 1933 (age 93) Copenhagen, Denmark

Gymnastics career
- Discipline: Men's artistic gymnastics
- Country represented: Denmark

Bjarne Jørgensen (born 13 May 1933) is a Danish gymnast. He competed in eight events at the 1952 Summer Olympics.
