= Vasil Konstantinov =

Bulgarian gymnast (1929–2016)

- Васил Иванов Константинов
- Full name: Vasil Ivanov Konstantinov
- Born: 15 April 1929 Burgas, Bulgaria
- Died: 14 March 2016 (aged 86) Toronto, Canada

Gymnastics career
- Discipline: Men's artistic gymnastics
- Country represented: Bulgaria

Vasil Ivanov Konstantinov (Bulgarian: Васил Иванов Константинов) (15 April 1929 – 14 March 2016) was a Bulgarian gymnast. He competed in eight events at the 1952 Summer Olympics. Konstantinov died in Toronto, Ontario on 14 March 2016, at the age of 86.
