= Odd Lie =

Norwegian gymnast

- Born: 14 December 1926 Drammen, Norway
- Died: 5 May 2015 (aged 88) Drammen, Norway

Gymnastics career
- Discipline: Men's artistic gymnastics
- Country represented: Norway
- Gym: Drammens TF

Odd Lie (14 December 1926 – 5 May 2015) was a Norwegian gymnast. He competed in eight events at the 1952 Summer Olympics.
