= Sreten Stefanović =

Yugoslav gymnast (1916–2020)

- Full name: Sreten Sreta Stefanović
- Born: 17 November 1916 Sarajevo, Austria-Hungary
- Died: 18 February 2020 (aged 103) Vršac, Serbia

Gymnastics career
- Discipline: Men's artistic gymnastics
- Country represented: Yugoslavia

Sreten Sreta Stefanović (Serbian Cyrillic: Сретен Срета Стефановић; 17 November 1916 – 18 February 2020) was a Yugoslav gymnast. He competed in eight events at the 1952 Summer Olympics. Stefanović died on 18 February 2020.

== See also ==
- List of centenarians (sportspeople)
