= Manuel Gouveia =

Portuguese gymnast (1923–1986)

- Full name: Manuel Correia Robalo Gouveia
- Born: 2 June 1923 Lisbon, Portugal
- Died: 1 June 1986 (aged 62)

Gymnastics career
- Discipline: Men's artistic gymnastics
- Country represented: Portugal
- Club: Lisboa Ginásio Clube

Manuel Correia Robalo Gouveia (2 June 1923 – 1 June 1986) was a Portuguese gymnast. He competed in eight events at the 1952 Summer Olympics.
