= Anders Lindh =

Swedish gymnast (1929–1996)

- Full name: Ernst Anders Gustav Lindh
- Born: 2 October 1929 Örebro, Sweden
- Died: 19 November 1996 (aged 67) Örebro, Sweden

Gymnastics career
- Discipline: Men's artistic gymnastics
- Country represented: Sweden
- Gym: Arbetarnas Gymnastikförening

Ernst Anders Gustav Lindh (2 October 1929 – 19 November 1996) was a Swedish gymnast. He competed in eight events at the 1952 Summer Olympics.
