= António Leite (gymnast) =

Portuguese gymnast (born 1924)

- Full name: António Manuel Araújo Leite
- Born: 2 April 1924

Gymnastics career
- Discipline: Men's artistic gymnastics
- Country represented: Portugal

António Manuel Araújo Leite (born 2 April 1924) was a Portuguese gymnast. He competed in eight events at the 1952 Summer Olympics.
