= Antun Kropivšek =

Croatian gymnast (1925–2013)

- Born: 17 May 1925 Šentjur, Kingdom of Serbs, Croats and Slovenes
- Died: 12 July 2013 (aged 88) Zagreb, Croatia

Gymnastics career
- Discipline: Men's artistic gymnastics
- Country represented: (Socialist Federal Republic of Yugoslavia) Yugoslavia

Antun Kropivšek (17 May 1925 – 12 July 2013) was a Croatian gymnast. He competed in eight events at the 1952 Summer Olympics.
