= Arrigo Carnoli =

Italian gymnast

- Born: 31 January 1932 (age 94) Ravenna, Kingdom of Italy

Gymnastics career
- Discipline: Men's artistic gymnastics
- Country represented: Italy

Arrigo Carnoli (born 31 January 1932) is an Italian gymnast. He competed in eight events at the 1952 Summer Olympics.
