= Ragai Farhat =

Egyptian gymnast

- رجائى يوسف فرحات
- Full name: Ragai Youssef Farhat
- Born: 1932 Alexandria, Kingdom of Egypt

Gymnastics career
- Discipline: Men's artistic gymnastics
- Country represented: United Arab Republic
- Former countries represented: Egypt
Medal record
Men's artistic gymnastics
Representing Egypt
Mediterranean Games
Bronze medal – third place	1955 Barcelona	Team
Representing United Arab Republic
Mediterranean Games
Gold medal – first place	1959 Beirut	Team

Ragai Youssef Farhat (Arabic: رجائى يوسف فرحات; born 1932) is an Egyptian former artistic gymnast. He competed in eight events at the 1952 Summer Olympics in Helsinki, where he placed 154th in the individual all-around and helped the Egyptian team finish 16th. He later won a bronze medal in 1955 (Barcelona) and a gold medal in 1959 (Beirut).

== Early life ==
Farhat was born in 1932 in Alexandria (Al-Iskanderiya), Egypt. Limited public details are available about his early or family life.

Farhat was affiliated with the Young Men's Muslim Association (YMMA) club in Alexandria.

== Gymnastics career ==
Farhat represented Egypt in artistic gymnastics at the 1952 Summer Olympics. His results were:

Event	Position
Individual All-Around	154th
Team All-Around	16th (with the Egyptian team)
Floor Exercise	176th
Pommel Horse	=92nd
Rings	175th
Vault	=123rd
Parallel Bars	=133rd
Horizontal Bar	161st
