= Mahmoud Safwat =

Egyptian artistic gymnast

- محمود علي بيومي صفوت
- Full name: Mahmoud Ali Bayoumi Safwat
- Born: 16 November 1930 Cairo, Kingdom of Egypt
- Died: 12 May 2015 (aged 84) Cairo, Egypt

Gymnastics career
- Discipline: Men's artistic gymnastics
- Country represented: Egypt
Medal record
Men's artistic gymnastics
Representing Egypt
Mediterranean Games
Gold medal – first place	1951 Alexandria	Team vault
Silver medal – second place	1951 Alexandria	Team floor
Silver medal – second place	1951 Alexandria	Team rings
Silver medal – second place	1951 Alexandria	Team parallel bars
Bronze medal – third place	1951 Alexandria	Team all-around
Bronze medal – third place	1951 Alexandria	Team pommel horse
Bronze medal – third place	1951 Alexandria	Team horizontal bar
Bronze medal – third place	1951 Alexandria	Floor

Mahmoud Ali Bayoumi Safwat (Arabic: محمود صفوت على, 16 November 1929 – 12 May 2015) was an intelligence officer in the Egyptian General Intelligence and Security Service and a former gymnastics player on the Egyptian Gymnastics team competing in the 1952 Olympic Games in Helsinki, Finland.

== Gymnastics career ==
He was rated the 125th on players in overall ranking in the Helsinki Summer Games.
