= Magdy Gheriani =

Egyptian gymnast (born 1931)

- مجدي الغرياني
- Full name: Magdy Al-Gheriani
- Born: 18 February 1931 Alexandria, Kingdom of Egypt

Gymnastics career
- Discipline: Men's artistic gymnastics
- Country represented: Egypt

Magdy Al-Gheriani (born 18 February 1931) is an Egyptian gymnast. He competed in eight events at the 1952 Summer Olympics.
