= Gymnastics at the 1952 Summer Olympics – Men's vault =

Olympic gymnastics event

Men's vault at the Games of the XV Olympiad
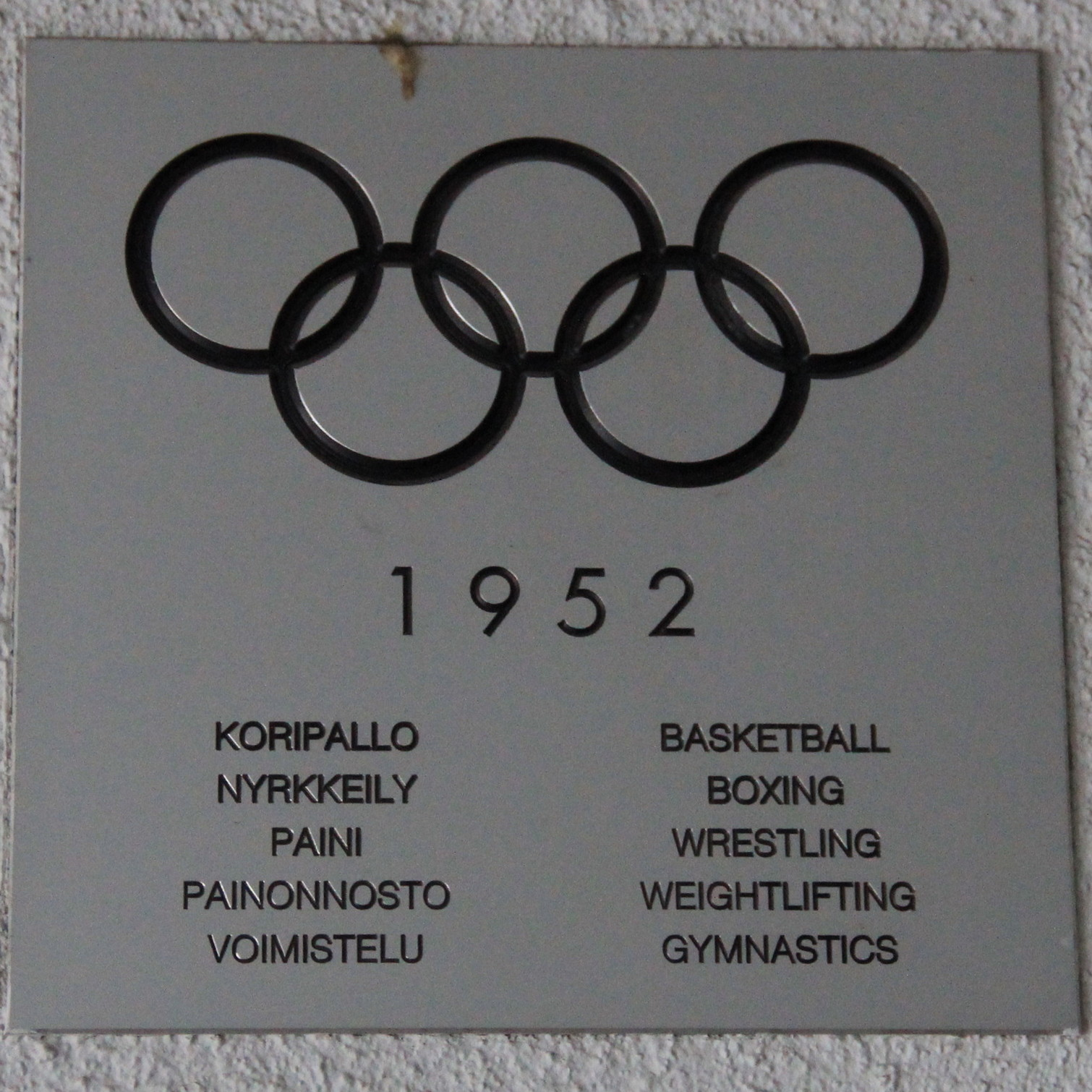
- Plaque at Töölö Sports Hall commemorating 1952 Olympic sports held there
- Venue: Töölö Sports Hall, Exhibition Hall I
- Date: 19–21 July 1952
- Competitors: 185 from 29 nations
- Winning score: 19.20

Medalists
1st place, gold medalist(s)		Viktor Chukarin	Soviet Union
2nd place, silver medalist(s)		Masao Takemoto	Japan
3rd place, bronze medalist(s)		Takashi Ono	Japan
3rd place, bronze medalist(s)		Tadao Uesako	Japan

The men's vault competition at the 1952 Summer Olympics was held at Töölö Sports Hall (then "Messuhalli"), Exhibition Hall I from 19 to 21 July. It was the eighth appearance of the event. There were 185 competitors from 29 nations, with nations competing in the team event entering up to 8 gymnasts and other nations able to send up to 3. The event was won by Viktor Chukarin of the Soviet Union, the nation's first medal in the event in its first appearance. Japan also earned its first medal(s): a silver and two bronzes, as Masao Takemoto finished second and there was a tie for third between Takashi Ono and Tadao Uesako.

== Background ==
This was the eighth appearance of the event, which is one of the five apparatus events held every time there were apparatus events at the Summer Olympics (no apparatus events were held in 1900, 1908, 1912, or 1920). Seven of the top 13 (including ties for 10th) gymnasts from 1948 returned: gold medalist Paavo Aaltonen of Finland, silver medalist Olavi Rove of Finland, all three bronze medalists (János Mogyorósi-Klencs and Ferenc Pataki of Hungary and Leo Sotorník of Czechoslovakia), and tenth-place finishers Kalevi Laitinen of Finland and Lajos Tóth of Hungary. The reigning (1950) world champion was Ernst Gebendinger of Switzerland.

Belgium, India, Norway, Poland, Portugal, Saar, South Africa, the Soviet Union, and Spain each made their debut in the men's vault. The United States made its seventh appearance, most of any nation, having missed only the inaugural 1896 Games. Of the 22 different nations that had competed at least once in the event before 1952, 20 competed in Helsinki (only Mexico and the Netherlands were missing among the nations having previously competed).

== Competition format ==
The gymnastics format continued to use the aggregation format. Each nation entered a team of between five and eight gymnasts or up to three individual gymnasts. All entrants in the gymnastics competitions performed both a compulsory exercise and a voluntary exercise for each apparatus. The 2 exercise scores were summed to give a total for the apparatus.

No separate finals were contested.

For each exercise, four judges gave scores from 0 to 10 in one-tenth point increments. The top and bottom scores were discarded and the remaining two scores averaged to give the exercise total. Thus, exercise scores ranged from 0 to 10 and apparatus scores from 0 to 20.

The event used a "vaulting horse" aligned parallel to the gymnast's run (rather than the modern "vaulting table" in use since 2004). Each competitor had two tries for each of the compulsory and voluntary vaults with the better score to count.

== Schedule ==
All times are Eastern European Summer Time (UTC+3)

Date	Time	Round
Saturday, 19 July 1952; Sunday, 20 July 1952; Monday, 21 July 1952	7:30; 8:00; 8:00	Final

== Results ==
Rank	Gymnast	Nation	Compulsory	Voluntary	Total
1st place, gold medalist(s)	Viktor Chukarin	Soviet Union	9.45	9.75	19.20
2nd place, silver medalist(s)	Masao Takemoto	Japan	9.55	9.60	19.15
3rd place, bronze medalist(s)	Takashi Ono	Japan	9.50	9.60	19.10
3rd place, bronze medalist(s)	Tadao Uesako	Japan	9.55	9.55	19.10
5	Hans Eugster	Switzerland	9.40	9.55	18.95
5	Theo Wied	Germany	9.45	9.50	18.95
7	Iosif Berdiev	Soviet Union	9.30	9.60	18.90
7	Ernst Fivian	Switzerland	9.40	9.50	18.90
9	Adalbert Dickhut	Germany	9.40	9.45	18.85
9	Wolfgang Girardi	Austria	9.45	9.40	18.85
9	János Mogyorósi-Klencs	Hungary	9.40	9.45	18.85
9	Leo Sotorník	Czechoslovakia	9.35	9.50	18.85
13	Helmut Bantz	Germany	9.40	9.40	18.80
13	Ferdinand Daniš	Czechoslovakia	9.35	9.45	18.80
13	Anders Lindh	Sweden	9.40	9.40	18.80
13	Alfred Schwarzmann	Germany	9.30	9.50	18.80
13	Josef Stalder	Switzerland	9.45	9.35	18.80
18	Ahmed Issam Allam	Egypt	9.35	9.40	18.75
19	Ivan Čaklec	Yugoslavia	9.55	9.15	18.70
19	Dmytro Leonkin	Soviet Union	9.20	9.50	18.70
19	Valentin Muratov	Soviet Union	9.25	9.45	18.70
19	Ferenc Pataki	Hungary	9.30	9.40	18.70
19	Jean Tschabold	Switzerland	9.45	9.25	18.70
19	Kalevi Viskari	Finland	9.45	9.25	18.70
25	Raymond Dot	France	9.30	9.35	18.65
25	Franjo Jurjević	Yugoslavia	9.40	9.25	18.65
25	Tetsumi Nabeya	Japan	9.35	9.30	18.65
28	Onni Lappalainen	Finland	9.35	9.25	18.60
28	Mahmoud Safwat	Egypt	9.10	9.50	18.60
28	Melchior Thalmann	Switzerland	9.30	9.30	18.60
31	Dušan Furlan	Yugoslavia	9.40	9.15	18.55
31	Mathias Jamtvedt	Norway	9.25	9.30	18.55
31	Akitomo Kaneko	Japan	9.25	9.30	18.55
31	Josy Stoffel	Luxembourg	9.30	9.25	18.55
35	Paavo Aaltonen	Finland	9.25	9.25	18.50
35	Vladimir Belyakov	Soviet Union	9.10	9.40	18.50
35	József Fekete	Hungary	9.20	9.30	18.50
35	Hrant Shahinyan	Soviet Union	9.05	9.45	18.50
35	Josef Svoboda	Czechoslovakia	9.15	9.35	18.50
40	René Changeat	France	9.25	9.20	18.45
40	Charles Simms	United States	9.30	9.15	18.45
40	Willi Welt	Austria	9.20	9.25	18.45
40	Ali Zaky	Egypt	9.45	9.00	18.45
44	Arne Carlsson	Sweden	9.30	9.10	18.40
44	Paul Grubenthal	Austria	9.25	9.15	18.40
44	Georg Johansen	Norway	9.30	9.10	18.40
44	Yevgeny Korolkov	Soviet Union	8.90	9.50	18.40
44	Kalevi Laitinen	Finland	9.20	9.20	18.40
44	Kaino Lempinen	Finland	9.20	9.20	18.40
44	Friedel Overwien	Germany	9.10	9.30	18.40
44	Littorio Sampieri	Italy	9.15	9.25	18.40
44	Hans Schwarzentruber	Switzerland	9.25	9.15	18.40
44	Volmer Thomsen	Denmark	9.30	9.10	18.40
54	Walter Blattmann	United States	9.25	9.10	18.35
54	Marcel Coppin	Luxembourg	9.10	9.25	18.35
54	Ernst Gebendinger	Switzerland	9.40	8.95	18.35
54	Poul Jessen	Denmark	9.30	9.05	18.35
54	Odd Lie	Norway	9.25	9.10	18.35
54	Michel Mathiot	France	9.05	9.30	18.35
54	Hans Sauter	Austria	9.20	9.15	18.35
54	Ed Scrobe	United States	9.35	9.00	18.35
54	Josef Škvor	Czechoslovakia	9.20	9.15	18.35
54	Mincho Todorov	Bulgaria	9.15	9.20	18.35
54	Erich Wied	Germany	8.95	9.40	18.35
65	Jack Günthard	Switzerland	9.15	9.15	18.30
65	Alf Nørgaard	Norway	9.20	9.10	18.30
65	Mikhail Perelman	Soviet Union	9.05	9.25	18.30
65	Lajos Tóth	Hungary	9.05	9.25	18.30
65	Luigi Zanetti	Italy	9.15	9.15	18.30
70	Hans Friedrich	Austria	9.25	9.00	18.25
70	Orlando Polmonari	Italy	9.05	9.20	18.25
70	Frank Turner	Great Britain	9.20	9.05	18.25
73	Joaquín Blume	Spain	9.30	8.90	18.20
73	Paweł Gaca	Poland	8.95	9.25	18.20
73	Vladimír Kejř	Czechoslovakia	9.00	9.20	18.20
73	Sándor Réthy	Hungary	9.10	9.10	18.20
73	Bob Stout	United States	8.80	9.40	18.20
73	Kurt Wigartz	Sweden	9.20	9.00	18.20
79	Hubert Erang	Luxembourg	8.90	9.25	18.15
79	Alf Olsen	Norway	9.25	8.90	18.15
79	Lajos Sántha	Hungary	8.95	9.20	18.15
79	Jack Wells	South Africa	9.10	9.05	18.15
83	Ferenc Kemény	Hungary	9.20	8.90	18.10
83	Arne Knudsen	Norway	9.10	9.00	18.10
83	Hans Pfann	Germany	9.00	9.10	18.10
83	Dimitar Yordanov	Bulgaria	9.05	9.05	18.10
87	Jack Beckner	United States	9.25	8.80	18.05
87	Magdy Gheriani	Egypt	8.95	9.10	18.05
87	Károly Kocsis	Hungary	9.10	8.95	18.05
87	Miloš Kolejka	Czechoslovakia	8.85	9.20	18.05
87	Jindřich Mikulec	Czechoslovakia	9.10	8.95	18.05
87	Zdeněk Růžička	Czechoslovakia	9.05	9.00	18.05
87	Börje Stattin	Sweden	9.25	8.80	18.05
87	Todor Todorov	Bulgaria	9.05	9.00	18.05
95	Don Holder	United States	9.20	8.80	18.00
95	Bjarne Jørgensen	Denmark	9.05	8.95	18.00
95	Berndt Lindfors	Finland	9.00	9.00	18.00
98	Ronnie Lombard	South Africa	9.05	8.90	17.95
98	Gunnar Pedersen	Denmark	9.10	8.85	17.95
100	Nikolay Atanasov	Bulgaria	8.85	9.05	17.90
100	Nils Sjöberg	Sweden	9.10	8.80	17.90
102	Vasil Konstantinov	Bulgaria	9.00	8.85	17.85
102	Heikki Savolainen	Finland	8.75	9.10	17.85
104	Arrigo Carnoli	Italy	8.80	9.00	17.80
104	William Thoresson	Sweden	9.10	8.70	17.80
104	André Weingand	France	8.95	8.85	17.80
107	Friedrich Fetz	Austria	9.10	8.60	17.70
107	Jey Kugeler	Luxembourg	8.60	9.10	17.70
107	Jack Whitford	Great Britain	9.05	8.65	17.70
110	Frederik De Waele	Belgium	8.85	8.80	17.65
110	Manuel Gouveia	Portugal	9.00	8.65	17.65
110	Heinz Ostheimer	Saar	8.80	8.85	17.65
110	Olavi Rove	Finland	8.15	9.50	17.65
114	Andrei Kerekes	Romania	8.45	9.15	17.60
114	Børge Nielsen	Denmark	8.70	8.90	17.60
114	Bill Roetzheim	United States	8.85	8.75	17.60
114	Ernst Wister	Austria	9.10	8.50	17.60
118	Aurel Losnita	Romania	8.45	9.10	17.55
118	Jeroom Riske	Belgium	8.60	8.95	17.55
120	Carol Bedö	Romania	8.55	8.95	17.50
120	Ahmed Khalil El-Giddawi	Egypt	8.55	8.95	17.50
120	Ivica Jelić	Yugoslavia	8.40	9.10	17.50
123	Franz Kemter	Austria	8.90	8.50	17.40
123	Magne Kleiven	Norway	8.70	8.70	17.40
123	Frederic Orendi	Romania	8.40	9.00	17.40
123	Fred Wiedersporn	Saar	8.65	8.75	17.40
123	Ragai Youssef	Egypt	8.75	8.65	17.40
128	Ángel Aguiar	Cuba	8.75	8.60	17.35
128	Fabio Bonacina	Italy	8.35	9.00	17.35
128	Francisc Cocis	Romania	8.50	8.85	17.35
128	Ryszard Kucjas	Poland	8.35	9.00	17.35
128	Zdzisław Lesiński	Poland	9.10	8.25	17.35
128	Walter Müller	Saar	8.60	8.75	17.35
128	George Weedon	Great Britain	8.35	9.00	17.35
135	Juan Caviglia	Argentina	8.40	8.85	17.25
135	Marcel de Wolf	France	8.40	8.85	17.25
137	Georges Floquet	France	8.25	8.95	17.20
137	Ede Mađar	Yugoslavia	8.20	9.00	17.20
137	Quinto Vadi	Italy	8.30	8.90	17.20
140	Szymon Sobala	Poland	9.15	8.00	17.15
141	Guido Figone	Italy	8.70	8.25	16.95
142	Ken Buffin	Great Britain	9.00	7.90	16.90
142	Jean Guillou	France	8.90	8.00	16.90
142	Ernst Madland	Norway	8.65	8.25	16.90
142	Manuel Prazeres	Portugal	8.40	8.50	16.90
146	Armand Huberty	Luxembourg	8.35	8.50	16.85
146	Børge Minerth	Denmark	9.10	7.75	16.85
146	Peter Starling	Great Britain	8.35	8.50	16.85
149	Freddy Jensen	Denmark	7.80	9.00	16.80
150	Rafael Lecuona	Cuba	8.00	8.75	16.75
151	Nikolay Milev	Bulgaria	7.65	9.05	16.70
151	Sreten Stefanović	Yugoslavia	9.20	7.50	16.70
153	Zoltan Balogh	Romania	7.55	9.10	16.65
153	Graham Harcourt	Great Britain	8.55	8.10	16.65
153	Jerzy Jokiel	Poland	9.15	7.50	16.65
156	Mohamed Sayed Hamdi	Egypt	7.75	8.70	16.45
156	René Schroeder	Luxembourg	7.70	8.75	16.45
158	Raymond Badin	France	7.55	8.85	16.40
159	Mahmoud Mohamed Reda	Egypt	7.50	8.80	16.30
160	Vincent D'Autorio	United States	7.10	9.15	16.25
161	Rolf Lauer	Saar	8.15	8.05	16.20
162	Karel Janež	Yugoslavia	7.10	8.95	16.05
162	Jerzy Solarz	Poland	8.80	7.25	16.05
164	Paweł Świętek	Poland	8.45	7.50	15.95
165	Silvio Brivio	Italy	8.50	7.35	15.85
166	Iliya Topalov	Bulgaria	6.60	9.05	15.65
167	Mihai Botez	Romania	6.50	9.00	15.50
168	César Bonoris	Argentina	8.95	6.50	15.45
169	Erich Peters	Sweden	6.65	8.75	15.40
170	Francisco Cascante	Cuba	6.65	8.35	15.00
171	Eugen Balint	Romania	6.00	8.95	14.95
172	Raúl Caldeira	Portugal	6.50	8.05	14.55
173	Arthur Schmitt	Saar	5.65	8.85	14.50
174	Rolf Yelseth	South Africa	7.05	7.35	14.40
175	Vir Singh	India	6.50	7.50	14.00
176	Norbert Dietrich	Saar	6.90	7.00	13.90
177	Paweł Gawron	Poland	8.00	5.50	13.50
178	Joaquim Granger	Portugal	6.25	7.00	13.25
179	Maurice De Groote	Belgium	4.75	7.25	12.00
180	António Leite	Portugal	5.25	6.00	11.25
181	Stoyan Stoyanov	Bulgaria	9.20	—	9.20
182	Jakob Kiefer	Germany	9.00	—	9.00
183	Antun Kropivšek	Yugoslavia	8.40	—	8.40
184	Manuel Cardoso	Portugal	0.00	5.65	5.65
185	Khushi Ram	India	0.00	5.50	5.50
