= World Artistic Gymnastics Championships – Women's vault =

Women's events at the Artistic Gymnastics World Championships were first held in 1934 at the 10th World Championships. Only the All-Around and Team events were held. In 1938, at the 11th World Championships, the other apparatus events were added.

The women's vault competition has been held in every year since its inception.

Three medals are awarded: gold for first place, silver for second place, and bronze for third place. Tie breakers have not been used in every year. In the event of a tie between two gymnasts, both names are listed, and the following position (second for a tie for first, third for a tie for second) is left empty because a medal was not awarded for that position. If three gymnastics tied for a position, the following two positions are left empty.

== Medalists ==
Bold number in brackets denotes record number of victories.

| Year | Location | Gold | Silver | Bronze |
|---|---|---|---|---|
| 1938 | (Czechoslovakia) Prague * | (Czechoslovakia) Vlasta Děkanová * | unknown | unknown |
| 1950 | (Switzerland) Basel | (Poland) Helena Rakoczy | (Austria) Gertrude Kolar | (France) Alexandra Lemoine |
| 1954 | (Italy) Rome | (Soviet Union) Tamara Manina (Sweden) Ann-Sofi Pettersson | —N/a | (Sweden) Evy Berggren |
| 1958 | (Soviet Union) Moscow | (Soviet Union) Larisa Latynina | (Soviet Union) Lidia Kalinina (Soviet Union) Tamara Manina (Soviet Union) Sofia Muratova | —N/a |
| 1962 | (Czechoslovakia) Prague | (Czechoslovakia) Věra Čáslavská | (Soviet Union) Larisa Latynina | (Soviet Union) Tamara Manina |
| 1966 | (West Germany) Dortmund | (Czechoslovakia) Věra Čáslavská | (East Germany) Erika Zuchold | (Soviet Union) Natalia Kuchinskaya |
| 1970 | (Socialist Federal Republic of Yugoslavia) Ljubljana | (East Germany) Erika Zuchold | (East Germany) Karin Janz | (Soviet Union) Lyubov Burda (Soviet Union) Ludmilla Tourischeva |
| 1974 | (Bulgaria) Varna | (Soviet Union) Olga Korbut | (Soviet Union) Ludmilla Tourischeva | (Czechoslovakia) Božena Perdykulová |
| 1978 | (France) Strasbourg | (Soviet Union) Nellie Kim | (Romania) Nadia Comăneci | (East Germany) Steffi Kräker |
| 1979 | (United States) Fort Worth | (Romania) Dumitrița Turner | (Soviet Union) Stella Zakharova | (Soviet Union) Nellie Kim (East Germany) Steffi Kräker |
| 1981 | (Soviet Union) Moscow | (East Germany) Maxi Gnauck | (Soviet Union) Stella Zakharova | (East Germany) Steffi Kräker |
| 1983 | (Hungary) Budapest | (Bulgaria) Boriana Stoyanova | (Romania) Lavinia Agache (Romania) Ecaterina Szabó | —N/a |
| 1985 | (Canada) Montreal | (Soviet Union) Yelena Shushunova | (Romania) Ecaterina Szabó | (East Germany) Dagmar Kersten |
| 1987 | (Netherlands) Rotterdam | (Soviet Union) Yelena Shushunova | (Romania) Eugenia Golea | (Romania) Aurelia Dobre |
| 1989 | (West Germany) Stuttgart | (Soviet Union) Olesia Dudnik | (Romania) Cristina Bontaș (United States) Brandy Johnson | —N/a |
| 1991 | (United States) Indianapolis | (Romania) Lavinia Miloșovici | (Soviet Union) Oksana Chusovitina (Hungary) Henrietta Ónodi | —N/a |
| 1992 | (France) Paris | (Hungary) Henrietta Ónodi | (Commonwealth of Independent States) Svetlana Boginskaya | (Commonwealth of Independent States) Oksana Chusovitina |
| 1993 | (United Kingdom) Birmingham | (Belarus) Elena Piskun | (Romania) Lavinia Miloșovici | (Uzbekistan) Oksana Chusovitina |
| 1994 | (Australia) Brisbane | (Romania) Gina Gogean | (Russia) Svetlana Khorkina | (Romania) Lavinia Miloșovici |
| 1995 | (Japan) Sabae | (Romania) Simona Amânar (Ukraine) Lilia Podkopayeva | —N/a | (Romania) Gina Gogean |
| 1996 | (Puerto Rico) San Juan | (Romania) Gina Gogean | (Romania) Simona Amânar | (Cuba) Annia Portuondo |
| 1997 | (Switzerland) Lausanne | (Romania) Simona Amânar | (China) Zhou Duan | (Romania) Gina Gogean |
| 1999 | (China) Tianjin | (Russia) Elena Zamolodchikova | (Romania) Simona Amânar | (Romania) Maria Olaru |
| 2001 | (Belgium) Ghent | (Russia) Svetlana Khorkina | (Uzbekistan) Oksana Chusovitina | (Romania) Andreea Răducan |
| 2002 | (Hungary) Debrecen | (Russia) Elena Zamolodchikova | (Russia) Natalia Ziganshina | (Uzbekistan) Oksana Chusovitina |
| 2003 | (United States) Anaheim | (Uzbekistan) Oksana Chusovitina | (North Korea) Kang Yun-mi (Russia) Elena Zamolodchikova | —N/a |
| 2005 | (Australia) Melbourne | (China) Cheng Fei | (Uzbekistan) Oksana Chusovitina | (United States) Alicia Sacramone |
| 2006 | (Denmark) Aarhus | (China) Cheng Fei | (United States) Alicia Sacramone | (Germany) Oksana Chusovitina |
| 2007 | (Germany) Stuttgart | (China) Cheng Fei (3) | (North Korea) Hong Su-jong | (United States) Alicia Sacramone |
| 2009 | (United Kingdom) London | (United States) Kayla Williams | (Switzerland) Ariella Käslin | (France) Youna Dufournet |
| 2010 | (Netherlands) Rotterdam | (United States) Alicia Sacramone | (Russia) Aliya Mustafina | (Brazil) Jade Barbosa |
| 2011 | (Japan) Tokyo | (United States) McKayla Maroney | (Germany) Oksana Chusovitina | (Vietnam) Phan Thị Hà Thanh |
| 2013 | (Belgium) Antwerp | (United States) McKayla Maroney | (United States) Simone Biles | (North Korea) Hong Un-jong |
| 2014 | (China) Nanning | (North Korea) Hong Un-jong | (United States) Simone Biles | (United States) Mykayla Skinner |
| 2015 | (United Kingdom) Glasgow | (Russia) Maria Paseka | (North Korea) Hong Un-jong | (United States) Simone Biles |
| 2017 | (Canada) Montreal | (Russia) Maria Paseka | (United States) Jade Carey | (Switzerland) Giulia Steingruber |
| 2018 | (Qatar) Doha | (United States) Simone Biles | (Canada) Shallon Olsen | (Mexico) Alexa Moreno |
| 2019 | (Germany) Stuttgart | (United States) Simone Biles | (United States) Jade Carey | (United Kingdom) Ellie Downie |
| 2021 | (Japan) Kitakyushu | (Brazil) Rebeca Andrade | (Italy) Asia D'Amato | Angelina Melnikova |
| 2022 | (United Kingdom) Liverpool | (United States) Jade Carey | (United States) Jordan Chiles | (France) Coline Devillard |
| 2023 | (Belgium) Antwerp | (Brazil) Rebeca Andrade | (United States) Simone Biles | (South Korea) Yeo Seo-jeong |
| 2025 | (Indonesia) Jakarta | (Individual Neutral Athletes) Angelina Melnikova | (Canada) Lia-Monica Fontaine | (United States) Joscelyn Roberson |
| 2026 | (Netherlands) Rotterdam | (Brazil) Rebeca Andrade (3) | (United States) Claire Pease | (United States) Skye Blakely |

* There is conflicting and incomplete information about medal winners in the individual apparatus events at the 1938 World Artistic Gymnastics Championships as non-primary sources gives different information about it.

== All-time medal count ==
Last updated after the 2026 World Championships.

| Rank | Nation | Gold | Silver | Bronze | Total |
|---|---|---|---|---|---|
| 1 | United States | 7 | 9 | 6 | 22 |
| 2 | Soviet Union | 7 | 8 | 5 | 20 |
| 3 | Romania | 6 | 9 | 6 | 21 |
| 4 | Russia | 5 | 4 | 0 | 9 |
| 5 | China | 3 | 1 | 0 | 4 |
| 6 | Brazil | 3 | 0 | 1 | 4 |
| 6 | Czechoslovakia | 3 | 0 | 1 | 4 |
| 8 | East Germany | 2 | 2 | 4 | 8 |
| 9 | North Korea | 1 | 3 | 1 | 5 |
| 10 | Uzbekistan | 1 | 2 | 2 | 5 |
| 11 | Hungary | 1 | 1 | 0 | 2 |
| 12 | Sweden | 1 | 0 | 1 | 2 |
| 13 | Belarus | 1 | 0 | 0 | 1 |
| 13 | Bulgaria | 1 | 0 | 0 | 1 |
| 13 | Poland | 1 | 0 | 0 | 1 |
| 13 | Ukraine | 1 | 0 | 0 | 1 |
| – | Individual Neutral Athletes ^{[c]} | 1 | 0 | 0 | 1 |
| 17 | Canada | 0 | 2 | 0 | 2 |
| 18 | CIS ^{[a]} | 0 | 1 | 1 | 2 |
| 18 | Germany | 0 | 1 | 1 | 2 |
| 18 | Switzerland | 0 | 1 | 1 | 2 |
| 21 | Austria | 0 | 1 | 0 | 1 |
| 21 | Italy | 0 | 1 | 0 | 1 |
| 23 | France | 0 | 0 | 3 | 3 |
| 24 | Cuba | 0 | 0 | 1 | 1 |
| 24 | Great Britain | 0 | 0 | 1 | 1 |
| 24 | Mexico | 0 | 0 | 1 | 1 |
| 24 | Russian Gymnastics Federation ^{[b]} | 0 | 0 | 1 | 1 |
| 24 | South Korea | 0 | 0 | 1 | 1 |
| 24 | Vietnam | 0 | 0 | 1 | 1 |
| Totals (29 entries) | | 45 | 46 | 39 | 130 |

Notes

- ^[a] Official FIG documents credit medals earned by athletes from former Soviet Union at the 1992 World Artistic Gymnastics Championships in Paris, France, as medals for CIS (Commonwealth of Independent States).
- ^[b] At the 2021 World Artistic Gymnastics Championships in Kitakyushu, Japan, in accordance with a ban by the World Anti-Doping Agency (WADA) and a decision by the Court of Arbitration for Sport (CAS), athletes from Russia were not permitted to use the Russian name, flag, or anthem. They instead participated under name and flag of the RGF (Russian Gymnastics Federation).
- ^[c] At the 2025 World Artistic Gymnastics Championships in Jakarta, Indonesia, in accordance with sanctions imposed following by the 2022 Russian invasion of Ukraine, athletes from Russia were not permitted to use the name, flag, or anthem of Russia. They instead participated as "Individual Neutral Athletes (AIN)", their medals were not included in the official medal table.

== Multiple medalists ==
| Rank | Gymnast | Nation | Years | Gold | Silver | Bronze | Total |
|---|---|---|---|---|---|---|---|
| 1 | Rebeca Andrade | Brazil | 2021–2026 | 3 | 0 | 0 | 3 |
| 1 | Cheng Fei | China | 2005–2007 | 3 | 0 | 0 | 3 |
| 3 | Simone Biles | United States | 2013–2023 | 2 | 3 | 1 | 6 |
| 4 | Simona Amânar | Romania | 1995–1999 | 2 | 2 | 0 | 4 |
| 5 | Elena Zamolodchikova | Russia | 1999–2003 | 2 | 1 | 0 | 3 |
| 6 | Gina Gogean | Romania | 1994–1997 | 2 | 0 | 2 | 4 |
| 7 | Věra Čáslavská | Czechoslovakia | 1962–1966 | 2 | 0 | 0 | 2 |
| 7 | McKayla Maroney | United States | 2011–2012 | 2 | 0 | 0 | 2 |
| 7 | Maria Paseka | Russia | 2015–2017 | 2 | 0 | 0 | 2 |
| 7 | Yelena Shushunova | Soviet Union | 1985–1987 | 2 | 0 | 0 | 2 |
| 11 | Oksana Chusovitina | Soviet Union; CIS; Uzbekistan; Germany | 1991–2011 | 1 | 4 | 4 | 9 |
| 12 | Jade Carey | United States | 2017–2022 | 1 | 2 | 0 | 3 |
| 13 | Alicia Sacramone | United States | 2005–2010 | 1 | 1 | 2 | 4 |
| 14 | Hong Un-jong | North Korea | 2013–2015 | 1 | 1 | 1 | 3 |
| 14 | Tamara Manina | Soviet Union | 1954–1962 | 1 | 1 | 1 | 3 |
| 14 | Lavinia Miloșovici | Romania | 1991–1994 | 1 | 1 | 1 | 3 |
| 17 | Svetlana Khorkina | Russia | 1994–2001 | 1 | 1 | 0 | 2 |
| 17 | Larisa Latynina | Soviet Union | 1958–1962 | 1 | 1 | 0 | 2 |
| 17 | Henrietta Ónodi | Hungary | 1991–1992 | 1 | 1 | 0 | 2 |
| 17 | Erika Zuchold | East Germany | 1966–1970 | 1 | 1 | 0 | 2 |
| 21 | Nellie Kim | Soviet Union | 1978–1979 | 1 | 0 | 1 | 2 |
| 21 | Angelina Melnikova | Russian Gymnastics Federation; Individual Neutral Athletes | 2021–2025 | 1 | 0 | 1 | 2 |
| 23 | Ecaterina Szabo | Romania | 1983–1985 | 0 | 2 | 0 | 2 |
| 23 | Stella Zakharova | Soviet Union | 1979–1981 | 0 | 2 | 0 | 2 |
| 25 | Steffi Kräker | East Germany | 1978–1981 | 0 | 0 | 3 | 3 |
