= Zoya Mironova =

Russian speed skater and sports surgeon

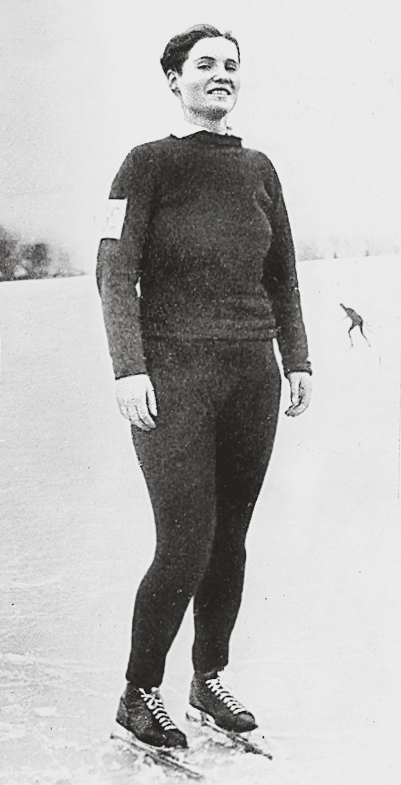
- Zoya Mironova in the 1930s

Personal information
- Born: Zoya Sergeyevna Noskova; 10 May 1913 Moscow, Russian Empire
- Died: 4 May 2008 (aged 94) Moscow, Russia

Sport
- Sport: Speed skating
- Club: Medik Moscow

Zoya Sergeyevna Mironova (née Noskova, Russian: Зоя Сергеевна Миронова, 10 May 1913 – 4 May 2008) was a Russian speed skater and sports surgeon, one of the founders of the sports traumatology in the Soviet Union. She was the head surgeon of the Soviet Olympic team between 1952 and 1976, and personally operated on Olympic champions including Valentin Muratov, Sofia Muratova, Yury Vlasov, Alexander Yakushev and Aleksandr Karshakevich.

== Biography ==
Mironova took up speed skating aged six. In 1933–34 she won the Soviet all-around speed skating title, and set a few national records. Her skating career went downhill in 1935 when she entered the I.M. Sechenov First Moscow State Medical University and devoted herself to medicine.

She had her first field experience with sports injuries in 1938, when she worked as a doctor at an intercity cycling road race. The same year she injured her knee before the Soviet speed skating championships. While recovering from surgery she decided to become a sports surgeon herself. Her plans were interrupted by World War II, during which she operated wounded soldiers in Moscow. Based on that extensive five-year experience, in 1946 she defended a PhD on the hip surgery after a gun wound.

In 1951, when the Soviet Union became member of the International Olympic Committee (IOC), Nikolai Priorov was appointed as the head physician of the Soviet Olympic team. He selected his assistants among former athletes such as Mironova. For political reasons, neither Priorov nor Mironova were allowed to travel abroad. The ban on Mironova was lifted only in 1956, when she presented a report on Achilles tendon surgeries at an international sports medicine conference in Luxembourg. She later attended the 1956 Summer Olympics as the head surgeon for the Soviet team.

After the 1952 Olympics Priorov founded the Soviet Institute of Traumatology and appointed Mironova as head of the Sport and Ballet Traumatology Department. Between 1952 and 1962 she performed 931 knee surgeries, and in 1962 defended a habilitation on knee injuries in sport.

Besides the knee, Mironova was a specialist in injuries of the shoulder and Achilles tendon. In 1954, together with Priorov she successfully operated the gymnast Valentin Muratov, who tore his Achilles tendon before the 1954 World Championships, and went on to win four gold medals at those championships, four months after the surgery. Later in 1960 Mironova performed a knee surgery on Valentin's wife, Sofia Muratova. Muratova went on to win three medals at the 1960 Olympics, and presented the gold one to Mironova as a token of gratitude. In 1960 Mironova also operated Yury Vlasov, who had developed carbuncles in his hips and had a high fever. Vlasov became a hero of the 1960 Olympics by winning the gold medal in heavyweight weightlifting.

Mironova continued working with the Soviet national team at all Olympics up to 1980. She performed her last surgery in 1990, aged 77, and continued consulting doctors up to the age of 93. In 1976 and 1980 she received the Olympic Order (bronze grade) for her contribution to the Olympic movement, becoming the first Soviet person to receive the Olympic Order; she is also the only person from the Soviet Union to receive two Olympic Orders.

== Personal life ==
In 1931, Mironova married her speed skating coach, the cyclist Pavel Mironov. Both of their sons, Nikolai (born 1940) and Sergey (born 1948), became renowned surgeons. Sergey took over his mother's department after her retirement in 1983.
