= 1954 World Artistic Gymnastics Championships =

Gymnastics competition

- Location: Rome, Italy

The 13th Artistic Gymnastics World Championships were held in Rome, the capital of Italy, on June 28 - July 1, 1954. It was the first World Championships at which the Soviet Union competed, winning 20 medals overall (more than three times the amount of any other country). Other major changes at this championships included: 1) it was the first world championships at which a Code of Points was used; and 2) it was the last world championships that would be held "in open air" (outdoors).

== Medallists ==
Event	Gold	Silver	Bronze
Men
Team all-around	Soviet Union; Albert Azaryan; Viktor Chukarin; Sergei Dzhayani; Yevgeny Korolkov; Valentin Muratov; Hrant Shahinyan; Boris Shakhlin; Ivan Vostrikov	Japan; Akitomo Kaneko; Akira Kono; Masami Kubota; Tetsumi Nabeya; Takashi Ono; Yoshiyuki Oshima; Masao Takemoto	Switzerland; Hans Bründler; Oswald Bühler; Hans Eugster; Jack Günthard; Hans Schwartzentruber; Josef Stalder; Melchior Thalmann; Jean Tschabold
Individual all-around	(Soviet Union) Viktor Chukarin (Soviet Union) Valentin Muratov	none awarded	(Soviet Union) Hrant Shahinyan
Floor	(Japan) Masao Takemoto (Soviet Union) Valentin Muratov	none awarded	(Sweden) Karl William Thoresson
Pommel horse	(Soviet Union) Hrant Shahinyan	(Switzerland) Josef Stalder	(Soviet Union) Viktor Chukarin
Rings	(Soviet Union) Albert Azaryan	(Soviet Union) Yevgeny Korolkov	(Soviet Union) Valentin Muratov
Vault	(Czechoslovakia) Leo Sotorník	(West Germany) Helmut Bantz	(Soviet Union) Sergei Dzhayani
Parallel bars	(Soviet Union) Viktor Chukarin	(Switzerland) Josef Stalder	(West Germany) Helmut Bantz (Japan) Masao Takemoto (Switzerland) Hans Eugster
Horizontal bar	(Soviet Union) Valentin Muratov	(West Germany) Helmut Bantz (Soviet Union) Boris Shakhlin	none awarded
Women
Team all-around	Soviet Union; Nina Bocharova; Pelageya Danilova; Maria Gorokhovskaya; Larisa Diriy; Tamara Manina; Sofia Muratova; Galina Rud'ko; Galina Sarabidze	(Hungary) Hungary; Eva Banati; Ilona Bánhegyi Milanovits; Irén Daruházi-Karcsics; Erzsébet Gulyás-Köteles; Ágnes Keleti; Alice Kertész; Olga Lemhényi-Tass; Edit Perényi-Weckinger	Czechoslovakia; Eva Bosáková; Miroslava Brdičková; Alena Chadimová; Věra Drazdíková; Zdeňka Lišková; Anna Marejková; Alena Reichová; Věra Vančurová
Individual all-around	(Soviet Union) Galina Rud'ko	(Czechoslovakia) Eva Bosáková	(Poland) Helena Rakoczy
Vault	(Sweden) Ann-Sofi Pettersson (Soviet Union) Tamara Manina	none awarded	(Sweden) Evy Berggren
Uneven bars	(Hungary) Ágnes Keleti	(Soviet Union) Galina Rud'ko	(Poland) Helena Rakoczy
Balance beam	(Japan) Keiko Tanaka	(Czechoslovakia) Eva Bosáková	(Hungary) Ágnes Keleti
Floor	(Soviet Union) Tamara Manina	(Czechoslovakia) Eva Bosáková	(Soviet Union) Maria Gorokhovskaya

== Men's results ==
=== Team competition ===
Rank	Team	Compulsory	Optional	Total
1st place, gold medalist(s)	Soviet Union	344.500	345.400	689.900
2nd place, silver medalist(s)	Japan	333.600	339.650	673.250
3rd place, bronze medalist(s)	Switzerland	333.650	337.900	671.550
4	Germany	334.400	335.850	670.250
5	Czechoslovakia	328.350	333.050	661.400
6	Finland	328.150	331.700	659.850
7	Hungary	322.600	327.400	650.000
8	Italy	314.300	323.150	637.450
9	Bulgaria	312.500	313.050	625.550
10	France	313.450	310.200	623.650
11	Poland	303.800	311.700	615.500
12	Yugoslavia	297.250	305.900	603.150
13	Austria	293.300	297.500	590.800
14	Egypt	280.800	275.900	566.700
15	Luxembourg	274.350	287.050	561.400
16	Denmark	273.000	287.500	560.500

=== Individual all-around ===
Rank	Gymnast	Total
1st place, gold medalist(s)	Valentin Muratov (URS)	115.450
1st place, gold medalist(s)	Viktor Chukarin (URS)	115.450
3rd place, bronze medalist(s)	Hrant Shahinyan (URS)	114.600
4	Boris Shakhlin (URS)	114.050
4	Albert Azaryan (URS)	114.050
6	Ivan Vostrikov (URS)	113.650
7	Yevgeny Korolkov (URS)	113.500
8	Helmut Bantz (FRG)	113.400
9	Josef Stalder (SUI)	113.350
10	Takashi Ono (JPN)	112.850
11	Akira Kono (JPN)	112.500
12	Jack Günthard (SUI)	112.300

=== Floor exercise ===
Rank	Gymnast	Compulsory	Optional	Total
1st place, gold medalist(s)	Valentin Muratov (URS)	9.650	9.600	19.250
1st place, gold medalist(s)	Masao Takemoto (JPN)	9.650	9.600	19.250
3rd place, bronze medalist(s)	William Thoresson (SWE)	9.450	9.750	19.200
4	Viktor Chukarin (URS)	9.550	9.600	19.150
4	Masami Kubota (JPN)	9.600	9.550	19.150
6	Hrant Shahinyan (URS)	9.550	9.500	19.050

=== Pommel horse ===
Rank	Gymnast	Compulsory	Optional	Total
1st place, gold medalist(s)	Hrant Shahinyan (URS)	9.600	9.700	19.300
2nd place, silver medalist(s)	Josef Stalder (SUI)	9.600	9.650	19.250
3rd place, bronze medalist(s)	Viktor Chukarin (URS)	9.500	9.700	19.200
4	Boris Shakhlin (URS)	9.450	9.700	19.150
5	Ivan Vostrikov (URS)	9.400	9.500	18.900
6	Valentin Muratov (URS)	9.350	9.500	18.850

=== Rings ===
Rank	Gymnast	Compulsory	Optional	Total
1st place, gold medalist(s)	Albert Azaryan (URS)	9.750	9.950	19.750
2nd place, silver medalist(s)	Yevgeny Korolkov (URS)	9.800	9.750	19.550
3rd place, bronze medalist(s)	Valentin Muratov (URS)	9.800	9.700	19.500
4	Viktor Chukarin (URS)	9.800	9.650	19.450
5	Hrant Shahinyan (URS)	9.600	9.800	19.400
6	Sergei Dzhayani (URS)	9.650	9.650	19.300

=== Vault ===
Rank	Gymnast	Compulsory	Optional	Total
1st place, gold medalist(s)	Leo Sotorník (TCH)	9.450	9.800	19.250
2nd place, silver medalist(s)	Helmut Bantz (FRG)	9.400	9.800	19.200
3rd place, bronze medalist(s)	Sergei Dzhayani (URS)	9.550	9.550	19.100
4	Albert Azaryan (URS)	9.300	9.600	18.900
4	Takashi Ono (JPN)	9.450	9.450	18.900
6	Adalbert Dickhut (FRG)	9.200	9.650	18.850

=== Parallel bars ===
Rank	Gymnast	Score	Prelim score	Total
1st place, gold medalist(s)	Viktor Chukarin (URS)	9.850	9.750	19.600
2nd place, silver medalist(s)	Josef Stalder (SUI)	9.750	9.800	19.550
3rd place, bronze medalist(s)	Masao Takemoto (JPN)	9.600	9.800	19.400
3rd place, bronze medalist(s)	Hans Eugster (SUI)	9.650	9.750	19.400
3rd place, bronze medalist(s)	Helmut Bantz (FRG)	9.600	9.800	19.400
6	Jack Günthard (SUI)	9.700	9.650	19.350

=== Horizontal bar ===
Rank	Gymnast	Compulsory	Optional	Total
1st place, gold medalist(s)	Valentin Muratov (URS)	9.800	9.900	19.700
2nd place, silver medalist(s)	Helmut Bantz (FRG)	9.750	9.650	19.400
2nd place, silver medalist(s)	Boris Shakhlin (URS)	9.700	9.700	19.400
4	Josef Stalder (SUI)	9.600	9.700	19.300
5	Masao Takemoto (JPN)	9.600	9.650	19.250
5	Viktor Chukarin (URS)	9.550	9.700	19.250

== Women's results ==
=== Team competition ===
Rank	Team	Total
1st place, gold medalist(s)	Soviet Union	524.310
2nd place, silver medalist(s)	Hungary	518.280
3rd place, bronze medalist(s)	Czechoslovakia	511.750
4	Romania	498.570
5	Italy	495.770
6	Poland	495.660
7	Bulgaria	494.030
8	Sweden	491.210
9	France	490.360
10	Germany	486.560
11	Yugoslavia	485.440
12	Austria	453.790
13	Belgium	430.710
14	Saar	407.240
15	Luxembourg	378.560

=== Individual all-around ===
Rank	Gymnast	Total
1st place, gold medalist(s)	Galina Rud'ko (URS)	75.680
2nd place, silver medalist(s)	Eva Bosáková (TCH)	75.110
3rd place, bronze medalist(s)	Helena Rakoczy (POL)	74.370
4	Edit Perényi (HUN)	74.310
5	Elena Leuşteanu (ROU)	74.240
6	Nina Bocharova (URS)	74.210
7	Maria Gorokhovskaya (URS)	74.140
8	Keiko Tanaka (JPN)	73.740
9	Alena Chadimová (TCH)	73.600
10	Erzsébet Gulyás-Köteles (HUN)	73.470
11	Alice Kertész (HUN)	73.440
12	Galina Sarabidze (URS)	73.420

=== Vault ===
Rank	Gymnast	Compulsory	Optional	Total
1st place, gold medalist(s)	Ann-Sofi Pettersson (SWE)	9.400	9.560	18.960
1st place, gold medalist(s)	Tamara Manina (URS)	9.660	9.300	18.960
3rd place, bronze medalist(s)	Evy Berggren (SWE)	9.430	9.500	18.930
4	Maria Gorokhovskaya (URS)	9.600	9.260	18.860
5	Galina Rud'ko (URS)	9.430	9.360	18.790
6	Elena Leuşteanu (ROU)	9.260	9.360	18.620

=== Uneven bars ===
Rank	Gymnast	Compulsory	Optional	Total
1st place, gold medalist(s)	Ágnes Keleti (HUN)	9.730	9.730	19.460
2nd place, silver medalist(s)	Galina Rud'ko (URS)	9.600	9.730	19.330
3rd place, bronze medalist(s)	Helena Rakoczy (POL)	9.500	9.700	19.200
4	Nina Bocharova (URS)	9.400	9.730	19.130
4	Eva Bosáková (TCH)	9.530	9.600	19.130
6	Pelageya Danilova (URS)	9.460	9.660	19.110

=== Balance beam ===
Rank	Gymnast	Compulsory	Optional	Total
1st place, gold medalist(s)	Keiko Tanaka (JPN)	9.260	9.630	18.890
2nd place, silver medalist(s)	Eva Bosáková (TCH)	9.300	9.460	18.760
3rd place, bronze medalist(s)	Ágnes Keleti (HUN)	9.160	9.560	18.720
4	Edit Perényi (HUN)	9.260	9.400	18.660
5	Galina Rud'ko (URS)	9.200	9.400	18.600
5	Nina Bocharova (URS)	9.000	9.560	18.560

=== Floor exercise ===
Rank	Gymnast	Compulsory	Optional	Total
1st place, gold medalist(s)	Tamara Manina (URS)	9.660	9.730	19.390
2nd place, silver medalist(s)	Eva Bosáková (TCH)	9.400	9.760	19.160
3rd place, bronze medalist(s)	Maria Gorokhovskaya (URS)	9.660	9.460	19.120
4	Ágnes Keleti (HUN)	9.500	9.600	19.100
5	Galina Rud'ko (URS)	9.360	9.600	18.960
5	Larisa Latynina (URS)	9.460	9.500	18.960

== Medals ==
Rank	Nation	Gold	Silver	Bronze	Total
1	Soviet Union (URS)	12	3	5	20
2	Japan (JPN)	2	1	1	4
3	Czechoslovakia (TCH)	1	3	1	5
4	Hungary (HUN)	1	1	1	3
5	Sweden (SWE)	1	0	2	3
6	Switzerland (SUI)	0	2	2	4
7	West Germany (FRG)	0	2	1	3
8	Poland (POL)	0	0	2	2
Totals (8 entries)		17	12	15	44
