= Gotfryd =

Gotfryd can be both a masculine given name and a surname. Notable people with the name include:

== Given name ==
- Gotfryd Gremlowski (1931–1987), Polish freestyle swimmer
- Gotfryd Lengnich (1689–1774), Polish historian, lawyer, and politician

== Surname ==
- Bernard Gotfryd (1924–2016), Polish-American photographer
- Marieta Gotfryd (born 1980), Polish weightlifter

== See also ==
- Gottfried
