= Dália da Cunha-Sammer =

Portuguese gymnast (1928–2022)

Personal information
- Nationality: Portuguese
- Born: 26 December 1928; Lisbon, Portugal
- Died: 19 October 2022 (aged 93)

Sport
- Sport: Gymnastics

Dália da Cunha-Sammer (26 December 1928 – 19 October 2022) was a Portuguese gymnast. She competed at the 1952 Summer Olympics and the 1960 Summer Olympics. She is considered one of the pioneers of Portuguese Olympic gymnastics.

Together with her sister Natália Cunha e Silva, she became a member of the women's athletics team of Sporting Clube de Portugal in 1946. She was Portuguese champion in the shot put in the 1946 and 1947 seasons, and Lisbon champion in the 80m hurdles, high jump and shot put. On July 10, 1948, she set a new national record in the shot put, with a mark of 9.73 m, a record that would stand for 12 years, and which earned her one of the three Regional Champion titles she won that year.

As a gymnast, she represented the Ginásio Clube Português, and as a gymnast she became one of the first three Portuguese women ever to participate in the Olympic Games, attending the 1952 Summer Olympics in Helsinki, together with her sister and Maria Laura Amorim. She was joined by Joseph Sammer, her trainer and boyfriend, a German man she would later marry. She returned to participate in the 1960 Summer Olympics in Rome.

She was also a cycling champion, skater and practitioner of acrobatic jumps, so at that time she was the most popular Portuguese sportswoman. In her extensive list of activities were also skiing, bullfighting on foot and on horseback, car racing and piloting airplanes. With her sister, she took part in the first motoring Tour of Portugal. Her sister was killed in a car accident at the age of 31.

Cunha-Sammer later developed a career as a trainer. She died on 19 October 2022, at the age of 93.
