= 1955 European Men's Artistic Gymnastics Championships =

1st European Men's Artistic Gymnastics Championships
- Location: Frankfurt, West Germany
- Start date: 10 April 1955
- End date: 11 April 1955

The first European Men's Artistic Gymnastics Championships took place in 1955. In this championship, there was no team competition, only individual competitions. Only men took part, and the championship took place in Frankfurt am Main.

The Soviet Union dominated the championships, and took the top two places, with a total of five golds in the apparatus finals. Boris Shakhlin, who won a total of 14 World Championship medals and 13 Olympic medals in gymnastics, won the overall competition.

== Results ==
=== Individual combined ===
Note: Free (FX), Pommel horse (PH), Rings (R), Vault (VT), Parallel bars (PB), High bar (HB), .

Place	Country	Name	FX	PH	R	VT	PB	HB	TOTAL
1st place, gold medalist(s)	Soviet Union	Boris Shakhlin	9.55	9.75	9.55	9.45	9.75	9.75	57.80
2nd place, silver medalist(s)	Soviet Union	Albert Azaryan	9.50	8.50	9.85	9.55	9.75	9.60	56.75
3rd place, bronze medalist(s)	West Germany	Helmut Bantz	9.40	9.20	9.55	9.60	9.75	9.15	56.65
4	West Germany	Adalbert Dickhut	9.60	9.15	9.40	9.75	9.05	9.35	56.30
5	Luxembourg	Joseph Stoffel	9.20	9.20	9.35	9.60	9.35	9.45	56.15
6	Sweden	Jean Cronstedt	9.70	9.35	8.75	9.30	9.40	9.60	56.10
7	France	Raymond Dot	9.25	9.00	9.30	9.30	9.45	9.45	55.75
8	France	Michel Mathiot	9.25	9.25	9.25	9.35	9.25	9.25	55.60

=== Apparatus finals ===
==== Floor exercise ====
Rank	Gymnast	Total
1st place, gold medalist(s)	Vladimír Prorok (TCH)	9.75
2nd place, silver medalist(s)	Jan Cronstedt (SWE)	9.70
3rd place, bronze medalist(s)	Adalbert Dickhut (GER)	9.60

==== Pommel horse ====
Rank	Gymnast	Total
1st place, gold medalist(s)	Boris Shakhlin (URS)	9.75
2nd place, silver medalist(s)	Jan Cronstedt (SWE)	9.70
3rd place, bronze medalist(s)	Hans Sauter (AUT)	9.60

==== Rings ====
Rank	Gymnast	Total
1st place, gold medalist(s)	Albert Azaryan (URS)	9.85
2nd place, silver medalist(s)	Helmut Bantz (GER)	9.55
2nd place, silver medalist(s)	Vladimír Prorok (TCH)	9.55
2nd place, silver medalist(s)	Boris Shakhlin (URS)	9.55

==== Vault ====
Rank	Gymnast	Total
1st place, gold medalist(s)	Adalbert Dickhut (GER)	9.75
2nd place, silver medalist(s)	Helmut Bantz (GER)	9.60
3rd place, bronze medalist(s)	Joseph Stoffel (LUX)	

==== Parallel bars ====
Rank	Gymnast	Total
1st place, gold medalist(s)	Helmut Bantz (GER)	9.75
1st place, gold medalist(s)	Boris Shakhlin (URS)	9.75
1st place, gold medalist(s)	Albert Azaryan (URS)	9.75

==== Horizontal bar ====
Rank	Gymnast	Total
1st place, gold medalist(s)	Boris Shakhlin (URS)	9.75
2nd place, silver medalist(s)	Albert Azaryan (URS)	9.60
2nd place, silver medalist(s)	Jan Cronstedt (SWE)	9.60

== Medal table ==
Rank	Nation	Gold	Silver	Bronze	Total
1	Soviet Union (URS)	6	3	0	9
2	West Germany (FRG)	2	2	2	6
3	Czechoslovakia (TCH)	1	1	0	2
4	Sweden (SWE)	0	3	0	3
5	Austria (AUT)	0	0	1	1
5	Luxembourg (LUX)	0	0	1	1
Totals (6 entries)		9	9	4	22
