= Maria Smirnova (gymnast) =

Azerbaijani artistic gymnast

- Alternative name: Mariia Smirnova
- Born: 13 October 1995 (age 30) Yoshkar-Ola, Russia

Gymnastics career
- Discipline: Women's artistic gymnastics
- Country represented: Azerbaijan (2014-2018)
- Former countries represented: Russia

Maria Smirnova (born 13 October 1995) is a Russian-born former artistic gymnast who competed internationally for Azerbaijan. She competed at the 2014 and 2015 World Championships.

== Gymnastics career ==
Smirnova finished fifteenth in the all-around at the 2010 Russian Cup. She finished twenty-first in the all-around and fifth on vault at the 2012 Russian Championships. At the 2013 Russian Championships, Smirnova competed for the Volga Federal District, and they won the team bronze medal, and she finished fifteenth in the all-around final. She also finished sixth in the vault final and seventh in the floor exercise final.

In 2014, Smirnova switched from Russia to competing for Azerbaijan along with Anna Pavlova, Marina Nekrasova, and Yulia Inshina, and these gymnasts formed Azerbaijan's first women's artistic gymnastics national team in seventeen years. They competed at the 2014 European Championships where they finished sixteenth in the qualification round. The same team then competed at the World Championships where they finished thirtieth in the qualification round.

Smirnova competed at the 2015 European Championships, and she finished fifty-ninth in the all-around during the qualification round. Then at the World Championships, and she finished 102nd in the all-around during the qualification round.

At the 2016 Baku World Cup, Smirnova finished sixth in the vault event final. She then competed at the European Championships with Yulia Inshina and Marina Nekrasova, and they finished twentieth in the qualification round.

Smirnova competed at the 2017 Baku World Cup on vault, but she did not qualify for the event final. She missed the rest of the season due to a leg injury that required surgery.

Smirnova competed at the 2018 European Championships with Yulia Inshina and Marina Nekrasova, but she injured her knee during the qualification round on the uneven bars and withdrew from the rest of the competition. This was her final competition.

== See also ==
- Nationality changes in gymnastics
