= Solarz =

Solarz is a surname. Notable people with the surname include:

- Jerzy Solarz (1930–1984), Polish gymnast
- Pablo Solarz (born 1969), Argentine actor
- Stephen Solarz (1940–2010), American politician
