= Maria Paseka =

Russian artistic gymnast

Maria Paseka Мария Пасека
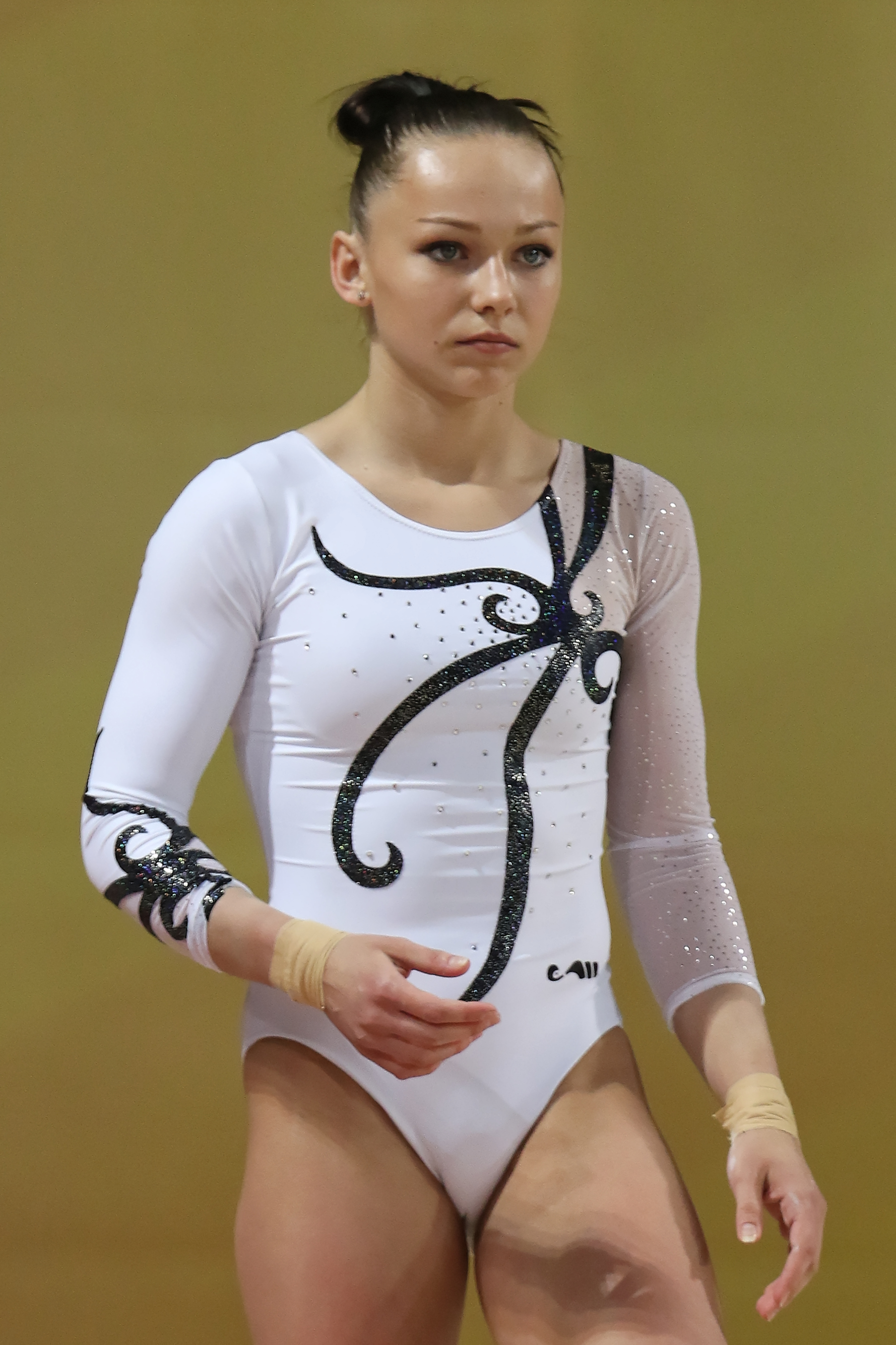
- Paseka at the 2015 European Championships in Montpellier, France

Personal information
- Full name: Maria Valeryevna Paseka
- Nicknames: Masha, Beefarm
- Born: 19 July 1995 (age 31) Moscow, Russia
- Height: 1.62 m (5 ft 4 in)

Gymnastics career
- Discipline: Women's artistic gymnastics
- Country represented: Russia; (2010–2021)
- Club: MGFSO Dynamo
- Head coach: Olga Sikorro
- Former coaches: Marina Gennadyevna Ulyankina, Nadezhda Galtsova, Vyacheslav Selifanov
Medal record
Representing Russia
Olympic Games
Silver medal – second place	2012 London	Team
Silver medal – second place	2016 Rio de Janeiro	Team
Silver medal – second place	2016 Rio de Janeiro	Vault
Bronze medal – third place	2012 London	Vault
World Championships
Gold medal – first place	2015 Glasgow	Vault
Gold medal – first place	2017 Montreal	Vault
Silver medal – second place	2019 Stuttgart	Team
European Championships
Gold medal – first place	2015 Montpellier	Vault
Gold medal – first place	2019 Szczecin	Vault
Silver medal – second place	2012 Brussels	Team
Bronze medal – third place	2013 Moscow	Uneven Bars
Summer Universiade
Gold medal – first place	2013 Kazan	Team
Gold medal – first place	2015 Gwangju	Team
Gold medal – first place	2015 Gwangju	Vault
Gold medal – first place	2017 Taipei	Team
Bronze medal – third place	2013 Kazan	Vault
Bronze medal – third place	2015 Gwangju	Uneven Bars
Bronze medal – third place	2017 Taipei	Vault

Maria Valeryevna Paseka (Russian: Мария Валерьевна Пасека; born 19 July 1995) is a Russian former artistic gymnast. During her decade-long career, she has primarily been successful as a vault specialist. On this apparatus, she is a two-time Olympic medalist (silver in 2016, bronze in 2012), a two-time world champion (2015, 2017), a two-time European champion (2015, 2019), the 2015 Universiade champion, and a two-time Russian national champion (2013, 2019). As a member of the Russian teams at the 2012 and 2016 Summer Olympics, Paseka won two silver medals in the team competition.

== Career ==
=== 2010 ===
Paseka competed at the Junior European Championships in Birmingham. She contributed an all around score of 55.850 toward the Russian team's first-place finish. In the vault final, she won silver with a score of 14.275.

=== 2011 ===
Paseka became age-eligible for senior level competition in 2011. She competed at the Russian Cup where she placed third on vault scoring 13.713 and fifth on floor scoring 13.125. Russian coach Valentina Rodionenko said, "In Yekaterinburg, she did not perform vault very well, but she has very difficult and high-level gymnastics."

In September, Paseka competed at the Artistic Gymnastics World Cup event in Ghent where she placed sixth on vault scoring 13.837 and fifth on floor exercise scoring 13.175. Later that month, Paseka competed at the Dinamo International in Penza. She placed second on vault scoring 13.935 and third on floor exercise scoring 14.034.

=== 2012 ===
Paseka competed at the 2012 Russian National Championships. She contributed scores of 14.867 on vault, 10.767 on uneven bars, and 13.533 on floor toward the Moscow team's first-place finish. In event finals, she placed third on vault scoring 14.120 and seventh on uneven bars scoring 11.440.

Paseka next competed at the 2012 European Championships in Brussels. She contributed a vault score of 14.833 towards the Russian team's second-place finish. At the Russian Cup, she contributed scores of 15.800 on vault and 14.134 on floor exercise toward the Moscow team's first-place finish. In event finals, she placed seventh on vault scoring 11.925 and seventh on uneven bars scoring 13.175.

At the end of July, Paseka competed at the 2012 Summer Olympics. In the team final, she contributed a vault score of 15.300 toward the Russian team's second-place finish. In the vault final, she won the bronze medal with a score of 15.050.

=== 2013 ===
Paseka competed at the 2013 Russian Championships. She contributed scores of 15.750 on vault and 12.650 on uneven bars toward the Moscow team's second-place finish. In event finals, she placed first on vault scoring 13.475 and eighth on uneven bars scoring 11.725.

In April, Paseka competed at the 2013 European Championships. She won the bronze medal in the uneven bars final with a score of 14.400. She qualified for the vault final in second place with a score of 14.733. However, in the final she fell on both her vaults and finished seventh with a score of 13.499. In July, Paseka competed at the 2013 Summer Universiade in Kazan (with teammates Aliya Mustafina, Ksenia Afanasyeva, Tatiana Nabieva, and Anna Dementyeva). She contributed a score of 15.100 on vault towards the Russian team's first-place finish, and in doing so, qualified first to vault finals. She won bronze in the vault final with a score of 14.950.

=== 2015 ===
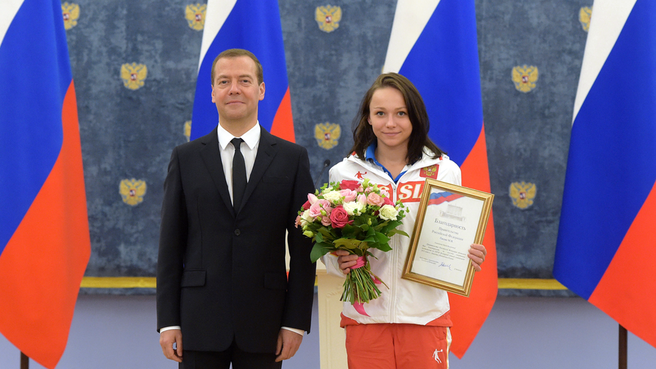
Paseka with former Russian President Dmitry Medvedev in 2015

Originally Paseka was not chosen to compete in the 2015 European Championships. However, due to the injuries of Alla Sosnitskaya, Paseka was subbed in as the replacement. Paseka arrived in Montpellier after the podium training, so she started the competition without it. Nevertheless, she qualified with 14.416, the fourth highest score, into the vault final, competing a Cheng vault with a difficulty score of 6.4 as her first vault and an Amanar with a 6.3 difficulty score as her second vault. She also gained a score which would have allowed her to enter the uneven bars final (14.233); however, she gave up her place due to the two per country rule. In the vault final held on 18 April, Paseka won the gold medal with a score 15.250. This was her first European vault medal. With the victory, she defeated the defending 2-time European vault champion Giulia Steingruber.

At the 2015 World Championships, Paseka competed vault, uneven bars, and floor exercise for the Russian team both in qualifications and in the final, all of which she performed cleanly. Due to mistakes by her teammates on the uneven bars and balance beam, Russia narrowly missed the podium, finishing in fourth place. However, Paseka qualified for the vault finals and also earned a score which would have allowed her to compete in the uneven bars final but lost her place because of two per country rule, with Daria Spiridonova and Viktoria Komova placing above her in qualifications. In the vault final, Paseka won the gold medal, defeating the reigning world champion on vault, Hong Un-jong, who won silver.

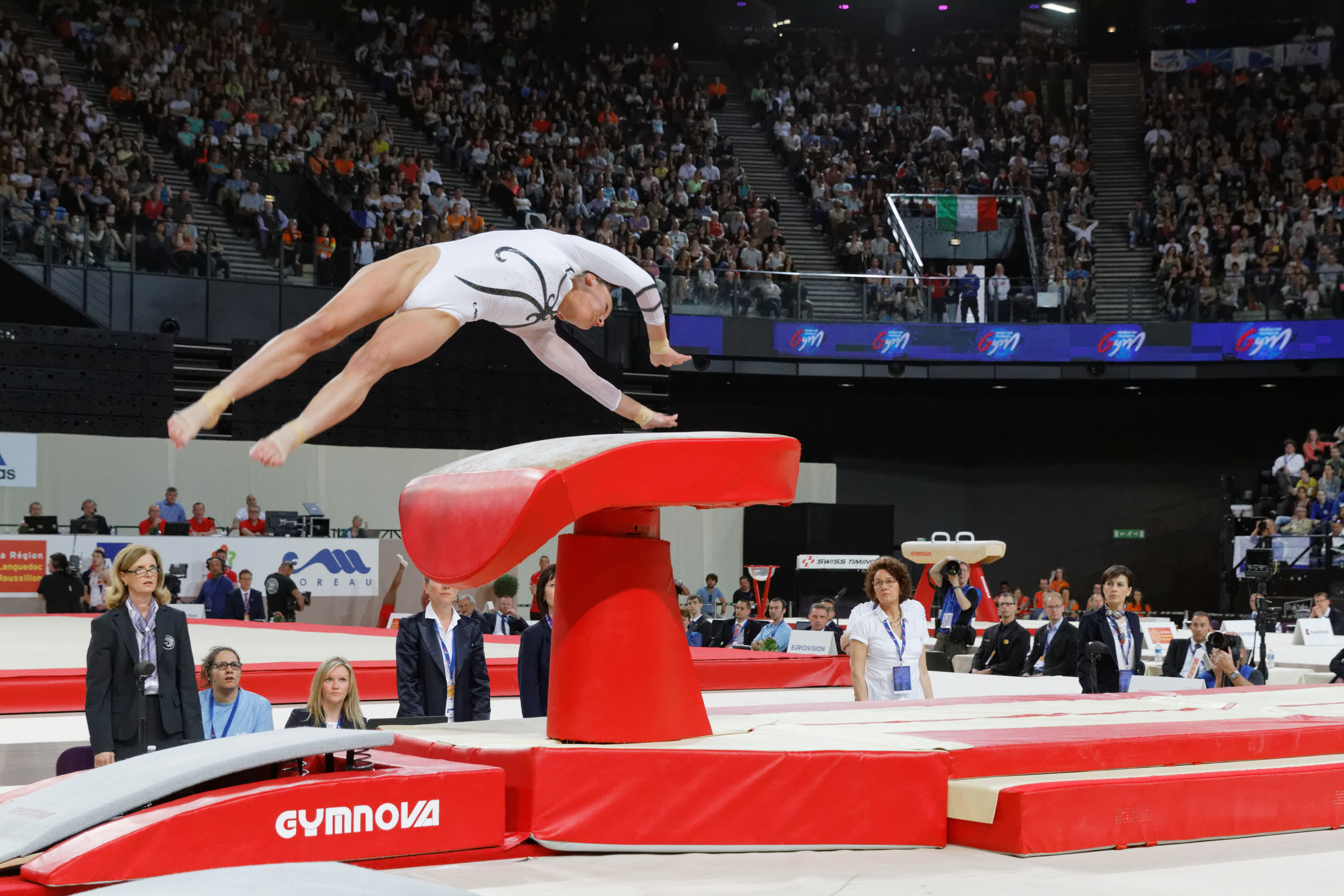
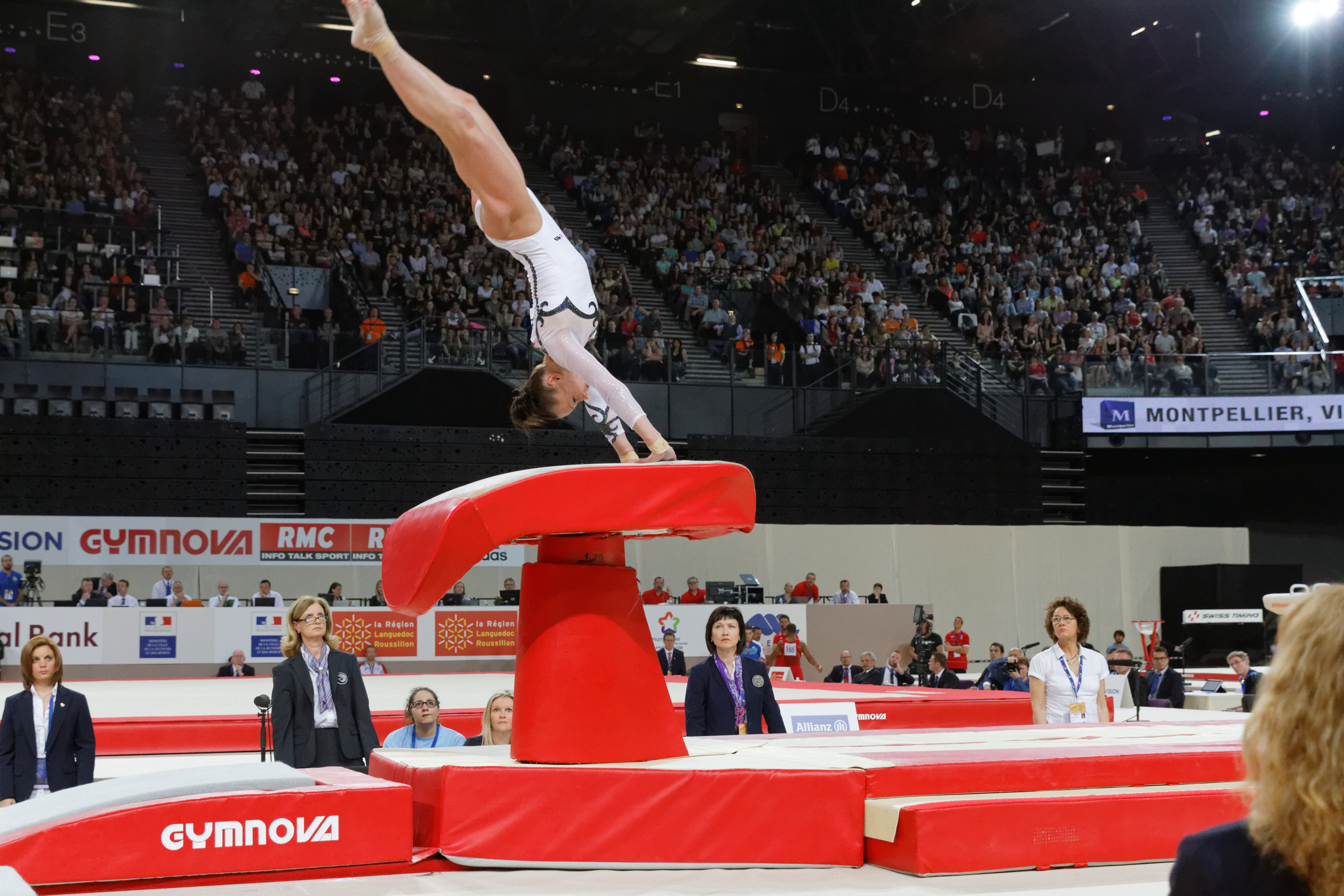
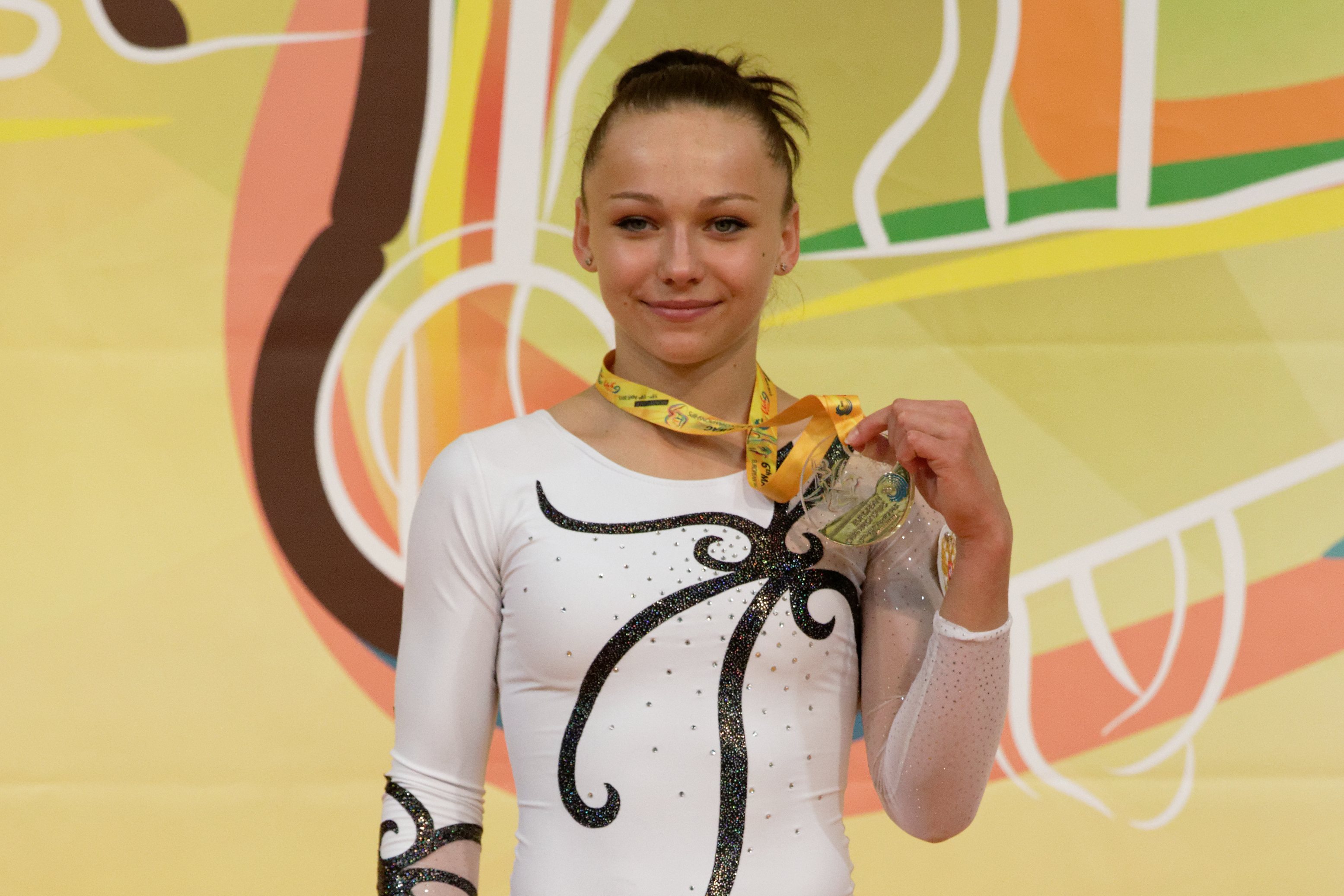
Paseka at the 2015 European Championships

=== 2016 ===
At the 2016 Olympic Games, Paseka won two silver medals: one for vault and one with the Russian team. During the team finals, she competed only on vault, successfully landing an Amanar to get the highest score for Russia on vault. In the vault finals, she did two clean vaults to clinch the silver. For her first vault she performed a Cheng, landing out of bounds, but a stuck landing boosted her score. For her second vault she performed an Amanar, taking just a step back. She was the first female gymnast since Ludmilla Tourischeva to medal on vault in two consecutive Olympic Games.

=== 2017–2018 ===
Paseka did not compete at the beginning of 2017 so she could recover from back pain she had experienced during the Olympics. Despite having not competed at nationals or World Cup events, she was still selected to compete at the European Championships due to her prowess on vault. At the European Championships, Paseka fell short of the podium, finishing fourth.

In August, Paseka was selected to represent Russia at the World Championships along with 2016 Olympic teammate Angelina Melnikova, Elena Eremina, and Anastasia Ilyankova. In qualifications, Paseka only performed on vault, where she showed a cleanly executed Cheng and Amanar despite difficulties in training. She qualified to the vault final in first place with an average score of 14.933 and then won the gold medal with a score of 14.850 in the final. She was the second Russian gymnast to win two world vault titles, and the first to do so consecutively. In December, Paseka underwent back surgery to put one of her vertebrae back into place.

Paseka spent 2018 recovering and rehabilitating her back. In December she was officially medically cleared to resume training and competing.

=== 2019 ===
Paseka made her comeback at the 2019 Russian National Championships where she placed first on vault after competing an Amanar and a Lopez. As a result, she was named to the team to compete at the 2019 European Championships in Szczecin alongside Angelina Simakova, Angelina Melnikova, and Anastasia Ilyankova. Paseka later competed at the Baku World Cup. She qualified to the vault final in sixth place after her Lopéz was downgraded to a Podkopayeva. In the final Paseka attempted her Cheng but fell and finished in fifth place. At the Doha World Cup Paseka qualified to the vault final in first place after successfully competing her Cheng and Amanar. In the vault final Paseka won silver, 0.117 points behind American Jade Carey. Her Amanar was the highest scoring vault of the competition (15.100).

At the European Championships, Paseka qualified to the vault final in fifth place after crashing her Cheng. During the final she won gold, beating 2017 European vault champion Coline Devillard. In June she competed at the Korea Cup where she placed fourth on vault after downgrading her Cheng to a Lopez and falling on her Amanar. In August Paseka competed at the Russian Cup on both vault and uneven bars. During qualifications she scored 12.100 on uneven bars and did not advance to the finals; however she did qualify to vault final. During event finals she placed fifth on vault behind Lilia Akhaimova, Melnikova, Eleonora Afanasyeva, and Viktoria Trykina after a subpar performance.

In September, Paseka was named to the team to compete at the 2019 World Championships, replacing an injured Angelina Simakova. She was later named as the alternate. In November Paseka competed at the Cottbus World Cup where she placed sixth on vault after stepping out of bounds on her Amanar and falling while performing her Cheng.

=== 2020–2022 ===
In February, Paseka competed at the Melbourne World Cup where she placed eighth after falling on her Amanar and having her López downgraded. In March, she competed at the Baku World Cup but placed eleventh during qualification and did not qualify for the event final. However event finals were canceled due to the COVID-19 pandemic in Azerbaijan. Paseka later revealed that she injured her ankle in Baku and would therefore take a break from gymnastics and return after the 2020 Olympics.

The 2020 Baku World Cup became Paseka's final competition. In 2022, she announced her retirement from the sport.

== Competitive history ==
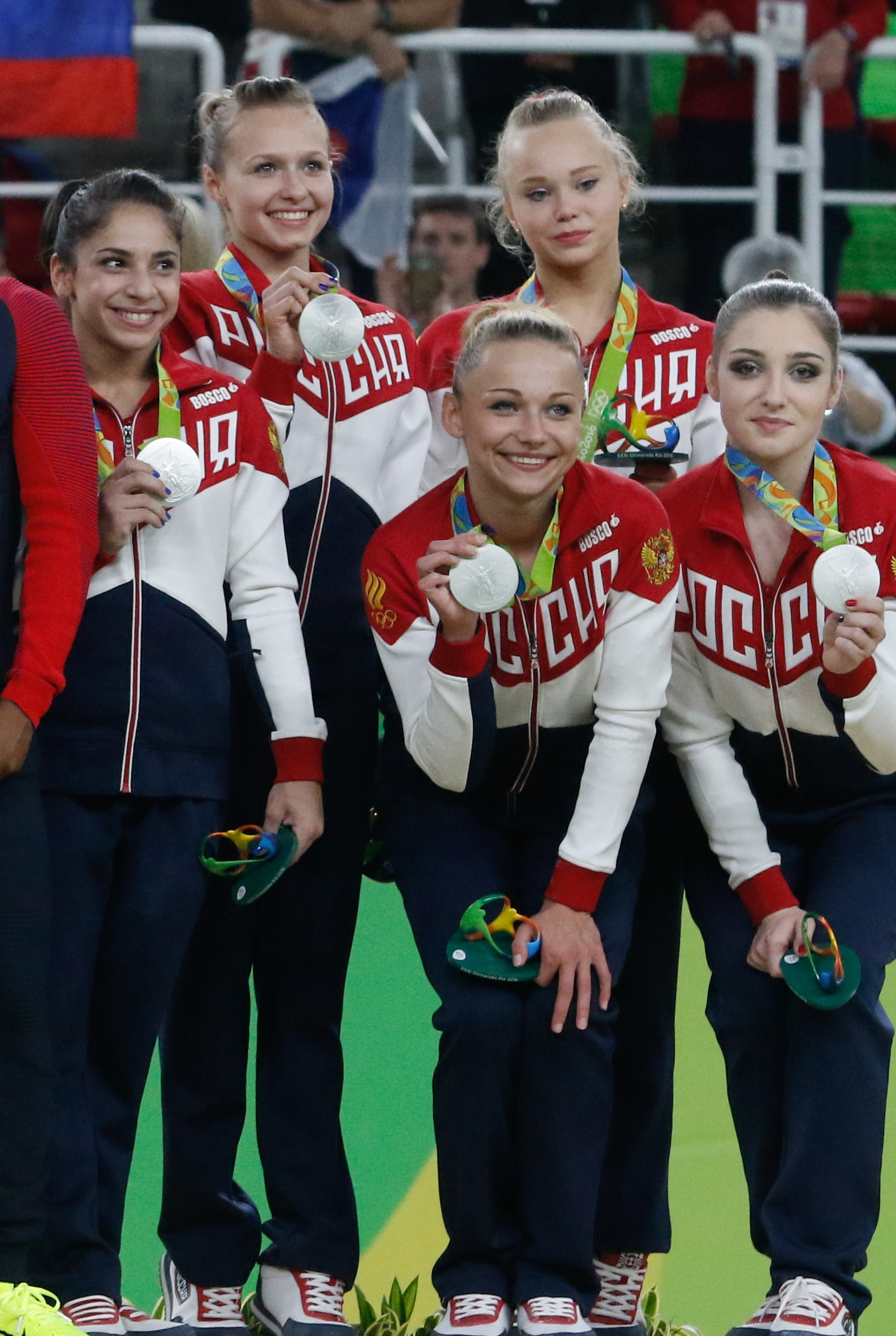
Paseka and the Russian team with their Olympic silver medals after the women's team final on 9 August 2016

Competitive history of Maria Paseka
Year	Event	Team	AA	VT	UB	BB	FX
2010
2010	Junior European Championships	1st place, gold medalist(s)		2nd place, silver medalist(s)			
2011	Russian Cup			3rd place, bronze medalist(s)			5
2011	Ghent World Cup			6			5
2012	National Championships	1st place, gold medalist(s)		3rd place, bronze medalist(s)	7		
2012	SUI vs. GBR vs. RUS	1st place, gold medalist(s)					
2012	European Championships	2nd place, silver medalist(s)					
2012	Russian Cup	1st place, gold medalist(s)		7	6		
2012	Olympic Games	2nd place, silver medalist(s)		3rd place, bronze medalist(s)			
2013	National Championships	2nd place, silver medalist(s)		1st place, gold medalist(s)	8		
2013	European Championships			7	3rd place, bronze medalist(s)		
2013	Universiade	1st place, gold medalist(s)		3rd place, bronze medalist(s)			
2013	Russian Cup	4		2nd place, silver medalist(s)	2nd place, silver medalist(s)		3rd place, bronze medalist(s)
2014	National Championships	2nd place, silver medalist(s)		2nd place, silver medalist(s)			
2014	Russian Cup	1st place, gold medalist(s)		3rd place, bronze medalist(s)			5
2014	Massilia Cup (Master Massilia)	2nd place, silver medalist(s)		1st place, gold medalist(s)	5		
2014	Voronin Cup			1st place, gold medalist(s)	2nd place, silver medalist(s)		
2015	National Championships	2nd place, silver medalist(s)		2nd place, silver medalist(s)	3rd place, bronze medalist(s)		
2015	European Championships			1st place, gold medalist(s)			
2015	Universiade	1st place, gold medalist(s)		1st place, gold medalist(s)	3rd place, bronze medalist(s)		
2015	Rusudan Sikharulidze tournament			1st place, gold medalist(s)	2nd place, silver medalist(s)		
2015	Russian Cup	1st place, gold medalist(s)		1st place, gold medalist(s)	5		2nd place, silver medalist(s)
2015	World Championships	4		1st place, gold medalist(s)			
2015	Toyota International Cup			1st place, gold medalist(s)			
2016	National Championships			4			
2016	Russian Cup	4		1st place, gold medalist(s)			
2016	Olympic Games	2nd place, silver medalist(s)		2nd place, silver medalist(s)			
2017
2017	European Championships			4			
2017	Universiade	1st place, gold medalist(s)		3rd place, bronze medalist(s)			
2017	World Championships			1st place, gold medalist(s)			
2019	National Championships	1st place, gold medalist(s)		1st place, gold medalist(s)			
2019	Baku World Cup			5			
2019	Doha World Cup			2nd place, silver medalist(s)			
2019	European Championships			1st place, gold medalist(s)			
2019	Korea Cup			4			
2019	Russian Cup			5			
2019	World Championships	(silver) (Note: Paseka was the Team RUS alternate.)					
2019	Cottbus World Cup			6			
2020	Melbourne World Cup			8			

== International scores ==
Year	Competition	Location	Apparatus	Rank-Final	Score-Final	Rank-Qualifying	Score-Qualifying
2012	European Championships	Brussels	Team	2nd place, silver medalist(s)	175.536	2	172.562
2012	European Championships	Brussels	Vault			9	14.149
2012	Olympic Games	London	Team	2nd place, silver medalist(s)	178.530	2	180.429
2012	Olympic Games	London	Vault	3rd place, bronze medalist(s)	15.050	3	15.049
2012	Olympic Games	London	Uneven Bars			79	0.000
2013	European Championships	Moscow	Vault	7	13.499	2	14.733
2013	European Championships	Moscow	Uneven Bars	3rd place, bronze medalist(s)	14.400	6	14.100
2015	European Championships	Montpellier	Vault	1st place, gold medalist(s)	15.250	4	14.416
2015	European Championships	Montpellier	Uneven Bars			5	14.233
2015	World Championships	Glasgow	Team	4	171.964	2	231.437
2015	World Championships	Glasgow	Vault	1st place, gold medalist(s)	15.666	2	15.583
2015	World Championships	Glasgow	Uneven Bars			6	14.800
2015	World Championships	Glasgow	Floor Exercise			42	13.666
2016	Olympic Games	Rio de Janeiro	Team	2nd place, silver medalist(s)	176.688	3	174.620
2016	Olympic Games	Rio de Janeiro	Vault	2nd place, silver medalist(s)	15.253	4	15.049
2017	European Championships	Cluj-Napoca	Vault	4	14.283	2	14.412
2017	World Championships	Montreal	Vault	1st place, gold medalist(s)	14.850	1	14.933
2019	European Championships	Szczecin	Vault	1st place, gold medalist(s)	14.516	5	14.133

== See also ==
- List of Olympic female gymnasts for Russia
