= Gymnastics at the 2012 Summer Olympics – Women's vault =

Women's vault at the Games of the XXX Olympiad
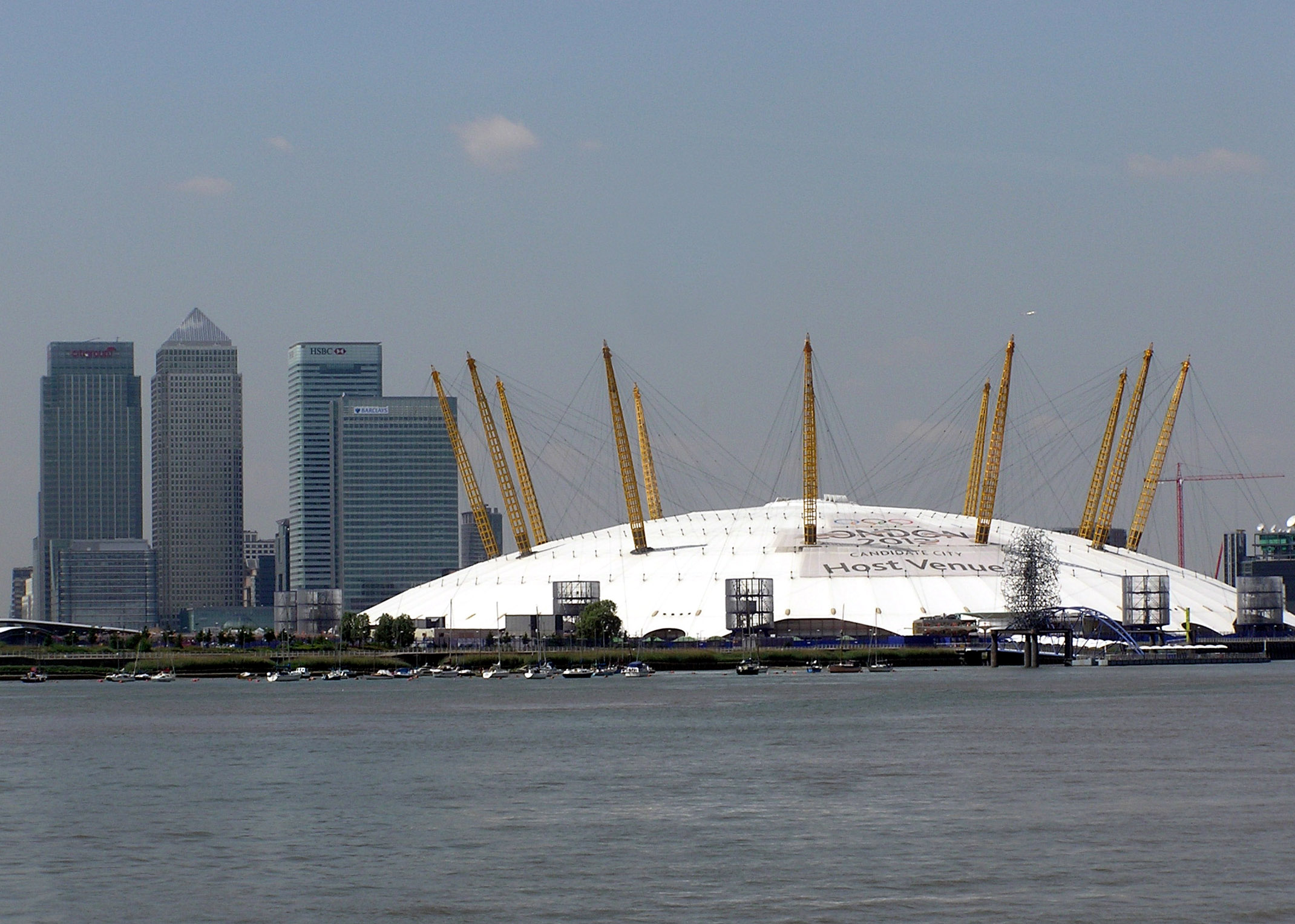
- Canary wharf and dome London
- Venue: North Greenwich Arena
- Date: 5 August
- Winning points: 15.191

Medalists
1st place, gold medalist(s)		Sandra Izbașa	Romania
2nd place, silver medalist(s)		McKayla Maroney	United States
3rd place, bronze medalist(s)		Maria Paseka	Russia

The women's vault competition at the 2012 Summer Olympics was held at the North Greenwich Arena on 5 August.

== Qualification results ==
Rank	Gymnast	Vault 1				Vault 2				Total
Rank	Gymnast	D	E	Pen.	Vault Score	D	E	Pen.	Vault Score	Total
1	McKayla Maroney (USA)	6.500	9.400		15.900	6.100	9.600		15.700	15.800
2	Sandra Izbașa (ROU)	6.100	9.400		15.500	5.800	9.333		15.133	15.316
3	Maria Paseka (RUS)	6.500	9.033		15.533	5.600	8.966		14.566	15.049
4	Oksana Chusovitina (GER)	6.300	8.833	0.10	15.033	5.500	9.083		14.583	14.808
5	Yamilet Peña (DOM)	7.100	7.833		14.933	5.800	8.666		14.466	14.699
6	Janine Berger (GER)	6.300	7.833		14.133	6.000	8.833		14.833	14.483
7	Brittany Rogers (CAN)	5.800	8.866		14.666	5.600	8.700		14.300	14.483
8	Ellie Black (CAN)	6.300	8.500		14.800	5.200	8.733		13.933	14.366

=== Reserves ===
- Giulia Steingruber (SUI)
- Nastassia Marachkouskaya (BLR)
- Phan Thị Hà Thanh (VIE)

== Final results ==
McKayla Maroney of the United States, the defending world champion and top qualifier to the vault final, was the favourite to win but placed second after falling on her second vault.

Oksana Chusovitina, who placed fifth, set a record by competing in her sixth consecutive Olympic vault final.

	Name	Country	Date of birth	Age
Youngest competitor	Janine Berger	Germany	21 April 1996	16 years
Oldest competitor	Oksana Chusovitina	Germany	19 June 1975	37 years

Rank	Gymnast	Country	Vault 1				Vault 2				Total
Rank	Gymnast	Country	D	E	Pen.	Vault Score	D	E	Pen.	Vault Score	Total
Gold medal	Sandra Izbașa	Romania	6.100	9.283		15.383	5.800	9.200		15.000	15.191
Silver medal	McKayla Maroney	United States	6.500	9.666	0.3	15.866	6.100	8.200		14.300	15.083
Bronze medal	Maria Paseka	Russia	6.500	8.900		15.400	5.600	9.100		14.700	15.050
4	Janine Berger	Germany	6.300	8.833		15.133	6.000	8.900		14.900	15.016
5	Oksana Chusovitina	Germany	6.300	8.800		15.100	5.500	8.966		14.466	14.783
6	Yamilet Peña	Dominican Republic	7.100	7.566	0.1	14.566	5.800	8.666		14.466	14.516
7	Brittany Rogers	Canada	5.800	8.966		14.766	5.600	8.600		14.200	14.483
8	Ellie Black	Canada	0.000	0.000		0.000	0.000	0.000		0.000	0.000*

- *Black landed on her face during her first vault, and it was deemed by the judges that her feet did not land first (though replays suggested this may not have been the case). She started to attempt a second vault, but ran past the table due to realising that she was more injured than she thought. She had the option to attempt her second vault again, but declined due to injury.
