= Marina Nekrasova =

Russian-born Azerbaijani artistic gymnast

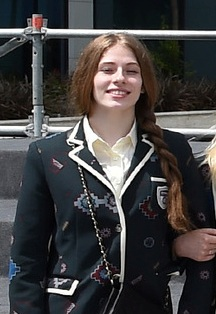
- Nekrasova in 2017

Personal information
- Born: 19 April 1995 (age 31) Voronezh, Russia
- Height: 160 cm (5 ft 3 in)

Gymnastics career
- Discipline: Women's artistic gymnastics
- Country represented: Azerbaijan (2013–present); Russia (until 2013) (2013–present (AZE))
- Club: Ojaq Sports Club
- Head coach: Volha Barkalava
Medal record
Women's artistic gymnastics
Representing Azerbaijan
Summer Universiade
Gold medal – first place	2019 Napoli	Vault
Islamic Solidarity Games
Gold medal – first place	2017 Baku	Team
Silver medal – second place	2017 Baku	Vault
Silver medal – second place	2017 Baku	Balance beam
FIG World Cup
Event	1st	2nd	3rd
Apparatus World Cup	0	1	1
World Challenge Cup	3	0	1
Total	3	1	2

Marina Nekrasova (Russian: Марина Некрасова; born 19 April 1995) is a Russian-born artistic gymnast who has represented Azerbaijan since 2013. She is the 2019 Summer Universiade vault champion. At the 2017 Islamic Solidarity Games, she won gold in the team event and silver medals on the vault and balance beam. She is also a three-time World Challenge Cup vault champion. She competed at the 2020 Olympic Games, making her the first woman artistic gymnast to represent Azerbaijan at the Olympic Games.

== Personal life ==
Nekrasova was born on 19 April 1995 in Voronezh along with her twin sister Tamara. They both began gymnastics when they were three years old. She graduated from the Voronezh State Institute of Physical Education in 2016.

== Career ==
=== 2013 ===
Nekrasova finished sixteenth in the all-around at the Russian Championships. Then at the Russian Cup, she won the bronze medal with the Central Federal District team. Individually, she finished twelfth in the all-around and fifth on vault. At the end of 2013, Azerbaijan began rebuilding its national gymnastics team in preparation for the 2015 European Games, and Nekrasova was invited to join the team alongside Anna Pavlova, Yulia Inshina, and Maria Smirnova. Her first competition for Azerbaijan was the Voronin Cup where she won the all-around bronze medal behind Alena Vasilyeva and Pavlova. She also won the silver medal on the balance beam behind Vasilyeva, and she finished fifth on the uneven bars and fourth on the floor exercise.

=== 2014 ===
Nekrasova's first competition of the 2014 season was the Cottbus World Cup where she placed sixth on the vault. She competed with Anna Pavlova, Yulia Inshina, and Maria Smirnova at the 2014 European Championships where they finished sixteenth in the qualification round. She then competed at the Bosphorus Tournament in Istanbul and won the silver medal in the all-around and on vault both behind Pavlova. She also won the bronze medal on the floor exercise behind Aida Bauryzhanova and Inshina, and she placed sixth on the uneven bars. The same team from the European Championships competed at the World Championships and finished thirtieth in the qualification round. Then at the DTB Team Challenge, Azerbaijan finished fifth, and Nekrasova won the bronze medal in the all-around behind Pauline Schäfer and Lisa Ecker.

=== 2015 ===
Nekrasova competed at the European Championships, and she finished forty-fifth in the all-around during the qualification round. She also failed to qualify for any finals at the Anadia World Cup. She was selected to represent Azerbaijan at the 2015 European Games alongside Yulia Inshina and Kristina Pravdina, and they finished thirteenth in the team competition. Nekrasova qualified for the all-around final and finished fifteenth with a total score of 50.098. Then at the World Championships she finished eighty-eighth in the all-around during the qualification round.

=== 2016 ===
Nekrasova won the bronze medal on the floor exercise at the Baku World Challenge Cup, the first World Cup medal of her career. Then at the Doha World Challenge Cup, she finished sixth on the vault. She finished sixty-second in the all-around at the Olympic Test Event with a total score of 49.133. This result made her the first reserve for the 2016 Olympic Games. She then competed at the European Championships with Yulia Inshina and Maria Smirnova, and they finished twentieth in the qualification round.

=== 2017 ===
At the Baku World Cup, Nekrasova won the bronze medal on the floor exercise behind Catalina Ponor and Emily Little, and she placed fourth on both the vault and balance beam. She then competed at the Islamic Solidarity Games alongside Yulia Inshina and Ekaterina Tishkova, and they won the team gold medal. Individually, Nekrasova won the silver medal on the vault behind Oksana Chusovitina and on the balance beam behind Göksu Üçtaş. She also finished fourth in the all-around. She finished eighth on both the vault and the uneven bars at the Varna World Challenge Cup. She won her first World Cup title on the vault at the Szombathely World Challenge Cup. She was the third reserve for the all-around final at the World Championships after finishing twenty-eighth in the qualification round with a total score of 49.973. Then at the Voronin Cup, she won the bronze medal on the balance beam behind Russians Maria Kharenkova and Viktoria Trykina and the silver medal on the floor exercise behind Kharenkova. She also finished fourth on the vault and seventh in the all-around.

=== 2018 ===
At the Baku World Cup, Nekrasova won the silver medal on the vault behind Oksana Chusovitina. Then at the Mersin World Challenge Cup, she placed sixth on the vault and fifth on the uneven bars. During the European Championships, she landed on her head during her balance beam dismount and was carried out of the competition on a stretcher. She returned to competition at the Paris World Challenge Cup and finished seventh on vault. Then at the World Championships, she finished seventieth in the all-around during the qualification round.

=== 2019 ===
At the Baku World Cup, Nekrasova competed in a unitard for the first time to inspire Muslim girls in artistic gymnastics. She placed seventh on both the vault and balance beam. Then at the Doha World Cup, she finished eighth on vault. She qualified for the all-around final at the European Championships and finished twenty-third with a total score of 48.465. She then won the gold medal on vault at the Koper Challenge Cup with an average score of 14.475. She was then selected to represent Azerbaijan at the 2019 European Games where she placed sixth in the vault final. She then won the gold medal on vault at the Summer Universiade with an average score of 14.000. She won another World Cup vault gold medal at the Szombathely Challenge Cup. Then at the World Championships, she finished ninety-third in the all-around and qualified for an individual spot at the 2020 Olympic Games, becoming the first woman artistic gymnast from Azerbaijan to do so.

=== 2020–21 ===
During the qualification round of the 2020 Baku World Cup, Nekrasova finished third on vault. However, the event was canceled prior to the event finals due to the COVID-19 pandemic in Azerbaijan. She returned to competition at the postponed-2020 European Championships but did not qualify for any finals.

Nekrasova began her 2021 season at the European Championships and finished seventh on vault. She then competed at the Ukraine International Cup, winning the gold medal on the vault and the bronze medal on the uneven bars. She also placed fourth in the all-around and on the floor exercise and fifth on the balance beam. She then competed at the 2020 Olympic Games and finished seventieth in the all-around and nineteenth on the vault during the qualification round. She became the first woman artistic gymnast to represent Azerbaijan at the Olympic Games.
