= Hrant Shahinyan =

Soviet Armenian artistic gymnast

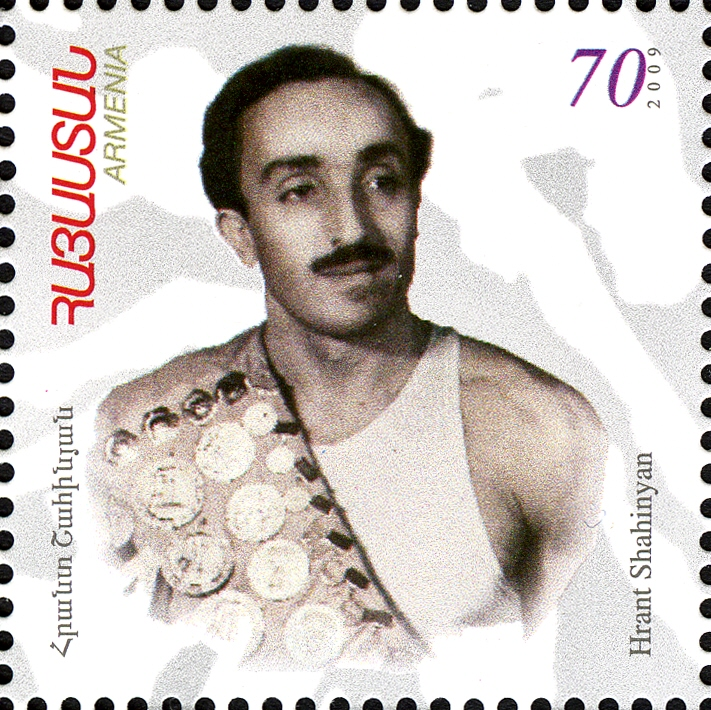

Personal information
- Born: 30 July 1923 Gyulagarak, Armenia, Transcaucasian SSR, Soviet Union
- Died: 29 May 1996 (aged 72) Yerevan, Armenia

Gymnastics career
- Discipline: Men's artistic gymnastics
- Country represented: Soviet Union
- Club: Spartak Yerevan
Medal record
Olympic Games
Gold medal – first place	1952 Helsinki	Team
Gold medal – first place	1952 Helsinki	Rings
Silver medal – second place	1952 Helsinki	All-around
Silver medal – second place	1952 Helsinki	Pommel horse
World Championships
Gold medal – first place	1954 Rome	Team
Gold medal – first place	1954 Rome	Pommel horse
Bronze medal – third place	1954 Rome	All-around

Hrant Shahinyan (Armenian: Հրանտ Շահինյան, 30 July 1923 – 29 May 1996), also known as Grant Shaginyan, was a Soviet Armenian gymnast. Specializing in the still rings and pommel horse, he is a two-time Olympic Champion, two-time World Champion and seven-time USSR Champion.

Shahinyan was awarded the honors Honoured Master of Sports of the USSR in 1952, Honored Coach of Armenia in 1961, and Honored Worker of Physical Culture and Sports of the Armenian SSR in 1966.

From 1967 to 1969, he headed the Sports Committee of the Armenian SSR, and from 1969 to 1975 he was the Deputy Chairman of the Sports Committee.

== Early life ==
Hrant Shahinyan was born on 30 July 1923 in the village of Gyulagarak. His family moved to Yerevan in 1930. In 1943, at the age of 20, Shahinyan volunteered to fight on the front line in World War II and received a wounded leg during service. He had to walk with a stick afterward, but after undergoing treatment in 1946 and through much hard work, was able to become a member of the USSR Artistic Gymnastic National Team.

== Gymnastics career ==
Hrant Shahinyan began studying gymnastics under Harutyun Gargaloyana after moving to Yerevan. In 1939, he became the undisputed champion of the USSR among juniors.

As a member of the Soviet Union national team, Shahinyan competed at the 1952 Summer Olympics in Helsinki.

Shahinyan had qualified for every event. The Soviet team won the Team All-Around gold medal. Afterwards, Shahinyan competed in the Individual All-Around, where he won the silver medal, coming in second to Viktor Chukarin, who would not only prove to be Shahinyan's rival, but the most decorated Olympian of the 1952 Olympics. Shahinyan was unable to best Chukarin in the pommel horse either. He tied for second with stablemate Yevgeny Korolkov, resulting in two silver medalists. Shahinyan came in fourth place in the parallel bars. When it came time for the still rings, Shahinyan scored higher than Chukarin and the rest of the participants to win the gold medal of the event and became the Olympic Champion in rings with a score of 9.950, a score which, among the men, between 1952 and 1976, seems to have been equaled or surpassed at a World Championships or Olympics only by fellow Armenian-Soviet Albert Azaryan, also on the rings, at the 1954 World Artistic Gymnastics Championships.

Two years later at the 1954 World Artistic Gymnastics Championships, Shahinyan became a World Champion in the pommel horse by winning the gold medal of the event, and the Soviet team won the gold medal in the Team All-Around once again. Shahinyan also won a bronze medal in the Individual All-Around.

In 1958, Shahinyan founded the Youth Gymnastic Olympic Sports School in the Armenian capital Yerevan, and became the director of the sports school. In 1975, Shahinyan arrived in Damascus to manage the Syrian gymnastics national team for almost 5 years until 1980. Later, he returned to Armenia and lived there until he died in 1996.

== Legacy ==
Shahinyan, who won two gold medals and two silver medals in gymnastics at the 1952 Summer Olympics in Helsinki, is the first Armenian in modern Olympic history to win an Olympic medal. To highlight the level of success of Armenians in the Olympics, Shahinyan was quoted as saying:

Armenian sportsmen had to outdo their opponents by several notches for the shot at being accepted into any Soviet team. But those difficulties notwithstanding, 90 percent of Armenian athletes on Soviet Olympic teams came back with medals.

In 2014, Shahinyan's statue was erected at the entrance of the Hrant Shahinyan gymnastics school of Yerevan.
