= Jean Cronstedt =

Swedish gymnast

- Full name: Jean Leopold Cronstedt
- Nickname: Janne
- Born: 6 October 1932 (age 93) Helsinki, Finland
- Height: 1.80 m (5 ft 11 in)

Gymnastics career
- Discipline: Men's artistic gymnastics
- Country represented: Sweden
- Club: Stockholms Gymnastikförening
Medal record
Representing Sweden
European Championships
Silver medal – second place	1955 Frankfurt	Floor exercise
Silver medal – second place	1955 Frankfurt	Pommel horse
Silver medal – second place	1955 Frankfurt	Horizontal bar
Bronze medal – third place	1959 Copenhagen	Horizontal bar

Jean Leopold Cronstedt (born 6 October 1932) is a Swedish former gymnast. He competed in eight events at the 1960 Summer Olympics. After his sports career, Cronstedt worked as a physician in Sweden, South Africa and Saudi Arabia.

== Early life ==
Cronstedt was born into the Swedish-speaking Finnish Cronstedt family in Helsinki, Finland. His paternal grandfather Jean Cronstedt (né Galindo) was the CEO of the Union Bank of Finland, and through him Cronstedt is partly of Spanish descent. In 1940, during World War II, he was sent to Sweden as a Finnish war child. He later returned to Helsinki and went to study in the United States. Cronstedt later moved to Sweden and acquired Swedish citizenship.
