= 2013 Russian Artistic Gymnastics Championships =

Gymnastics competition in Russia

Russian Artistic Gymnastics Championships
- Location: Penza, Russia
- Date: March 3–7, 2013

The 2013 Russian Artistic Gymnastics Championships were held in Penza, Russia from March 3–7.

== Medal winners ==
Event	Gold	Silver	Bronze
Senior
Team	Central Federal District; Ksenia Afanasyeva; Evgeniya Shelgunova; Anna Pavlova; Anna Dementyeva; Yuna Nefedova; Yulia Chemareva	Moscow; Aliya Mustafina; Maria Paseka; Anastasia Grishina; Anna Myzdrikova; Alla Sosnitskaya; Anastasia Marchuk	Volga Federal District; Olga Bikmurzina; Maria Smirnova; Polina Fedorova; Alena Polyan; Anna Dementyeva; Evgeniya Shelgunova
All-Around	Aliya Mustafina	Anastasia Grishina	Evgeniya Shelgunova
Vault	Maria Paseka	Kristina Kruglikova	Anna Pavlova
Uneven Bars	Anastasia Grishina	Tatiana Nabieva	Aliya Mustafina
Balance Beam	Evgeniya Shelgunova	Polina Fedorova	Ksenia Afanasyeva
Floor Exercise	Ksenia Afanasyeva	Kristina Goryunova	Alena Polyan
Junior
Team	Moscow; Viktoria Kuzmina; Evgenia Korolkova; Evgenia Zhukova; Daria Mikhailova; Seda Tutkhalyan; Anastasia Kuznetsova	Volga Federal District; Nadezhda Solomatina; Ksenia Kolokolneva; Zoya Shepetkova; Anastasia Dmitrieva; Natalia Kapitonova; Elena Bobyleva	Central Federal District; Kristina Levshina; Maria Bondareva; Marina Volkova; Elena Likhodolskaya; Yulia Sushkova; Polina Chuvashova
All-Around	MS:Maria Bondareva; CMS:Seda Tutkhalyan	MS:Viktoria Kuzmina; CMS:Anastasia Dmitrieva	MS:Evgeniya Zhukova; CMS:Daria Mikhailova
Vault	MS:Evgeniya Zhukova; CMS:Seda Tutkhalyan	MS:Evgeniya Korolkova; CMS:Anastasia Dmitrieva	MS:Ksenia Molozhavenko; CMS:Daria Skrypnik
Uneven Bars	MS:Viktoria Kuzmina; CMS:Seda Tutkhalyan	MS:Daria Spiridonova; CMS:Daria Skrypnik	MS:Kristina Levshina; CMS:Polina Petukhova
Balance Beam	MS:Maria Bondareva; CMS:Anastasia Dmitrieva	MS:Viktoria Kuzmina; CMS:Daria Mikhailova	MS:Evgeniya Zhukova; CMS:Daria Skrypnik
Floor Exercise	MS:Maria Bondareva; CMS:Daria Mikhailova	MS:Ksenia Molozhavenko; CMS:Varvara Batalova	MS:Evgeniya Zhukova; CMS:Seda Tutkhalyan

== Result ==
=== Team Final ===
Rank	Team	Vault (gymnastics)	Uneven bars	Balance beam	Floor (gymnastics)	Total
1st place, gold medalist(s)	Central Federal District	44.600	41.500	39.600	41.150	166.850
1st place, gold medalist(s)	Ksenia Afanasyeva	15.000		12.750	14.450	166.850
1st place, gold medalist(s)	Anna Dementyeva		14.400	13.550	13.600	166.850
1st place, gold medalist(s)	Anna Pavlova	14.800		13.300	13.100	166.850
1st place, gold medalist(s)	Evgeniya Shelgunova	14.800	13.300			166.850
1st place, gold medalist(s)	Yuna Nefyodova		13.800			166.850
1st place, gold medalist(s)	Yulia chemareva					166.850
2nd place, silver medalist(s)	Moscow	44.200	42.800	40.900	38.850	166.750
2nd place, silver medalist(s)	Anastasia Grishina	13.200	14.750	13.750	13.950	166.750
2nd place, silver medalist(s)	Aliya Mustafina	15.250	15.400	15.200		166.750
2nd place, silver medalist(s)	Maria Paseka	15.750	12.650			166.750
2nd place, silver medalist(s)	Anna Myzdrikova			11.950	13.150	166.750
2nd place, silver medalist(s)	Alla Sosnitskaya				11.750	166.750
2nd place, silver medalist(s)	Anastasia Marchuk					166.750
3rd place, bronze medalist(s)	Volga Federal District	42.750	39.600	40.200	39.450	162.000
3rd place, bronze medalist(s)	Anna Dementyeva *		14.400	13.550	13.600	162.000
3rd place, bronze medalist(s)	Evgeniya Shelgunova *	14.800	13.300			162.000
3rd place, bronze medalist(s)	Olga Bikmurzina	14.250			13.250	162.000
3rd place, bronze medalist(s)	Polina Fedorova		11.900	13.800		162.000
3rd place, bronze medalist(s)	Alyona Polyan			12.850	12.600	162.000
3rd place, bronze medalist(s)	Maria Smirnova	13.700				162.000
4	Saint Petersburg	42.150	39.200	39.050	39.300	159.700
4	Ekaterina Kramarenko	14.250	13.800	13.350	12.800	159.700
4	Lilia Akhaimova	13.850	10.900		13.200	159.700
4	Tatiana Nabieva	14.050	14.500			159.700
4	Anastasia Cheong			12.550	13.300	159.700
4	Maria Dunayeva			13.150		159.700
4	Alla Sidorenko					159.700
5	Northwestern Federal District	39.267	36.900	40.834	38.467	155.468
5	Daria Anishina	13.900	11.900		12.300	155.468
5	Eleonora Goryunova	13.050		10.450	12.400	155.468
5	Anna Vanyushkina	13.200			11.800	155.468
5	Tatiana Kirilova		11.700	12.500		155.468
5	Kristina Goryunova		14.050			155.468
5	Maria Dunayeva *			13.150		155.468
6	Southern Federal District	40.650	35.550	33.400	37.900	147.500
6	Anastasia Osetrova	13.900	11.650	11.450	11.450	147.500
6	Ekaterina Baturina		12.100	13.700	13.650	147.500
6	Natalia Medvedeva	13.400			12.800	147.500
6	Irina Andreyeva	13.350		8.250		147.500
6	Valeria Golenisheva		11.800			147.500
6	Elena Klyuchkova					147.500
7	Siberian Federal District	39.650	34.400	33.700	35.500	143.250
7	Maria Nechaeva	13.000	13.000	11.350	11.750	143.250
7	Ekaterina Shtronda	13.100	10.400	12.400	12.150	143.250
7	Olga Tyo	13.550	11.000	9.950	11.600	143.250
8	Urals Federal District	38.600	26.550	32.150	32.550	129.850
8	Francheska Yanayeva	13.450	9.850	9.550	10.450	129.850
8	Anna Solomeina		9.700	11.550	11.250	129.850
8	Maria Popova	12.550		11.050		129.850
8	Anastasia Kuznetsova		7.000		10.050	129.850
8	Elena Tyapkova	12.600				129.850

=== All-Around ===
Rank	Gymnast	Team	Vault (gymnastics)	Uneven bars	Balance beam	Floor (gymnastics)	Total
1st place, gold medalist(s)	Aliya Mustafina	Moscow	15.300	15.500	15.450	13.600	59.850
2nd place, silver medalist(s)	Anastasia Grishina	Moscow	14.900	15.000	14.900	12.600	57.400
3rd place, bronze medalist(s)	Evgeniya Shelgunova	Central / Volga	14.750	13.950	14.950	13.600	57.250
4	Ksenia Afanasyeva	Central Federal District	15.200	13.450	13.850	14.350	56.850
5	Kristina Goryunova	Northwestern Federal District	14.150	13.750	14.600	13.450	55.950
6	Anna Dementyeva	Central / Volga	14.050	14.800	13.700	12.850	55.400
7	Anna Pavlova	Central Federal District	14.900	12.650	13.850	13.050	54.450
8	Ekaterina Kramarenko	Saint Petersburg	14.450	13.150	13.900	12.750	54.250
9	Alla Sosnitskaya	Moscow	14.700	14.000	12.650	12.650	54.000
10	Polina Feodorova	Volga Federal District	13.950	12.700	13.900	13.050	53.600
11	Olga Bikmurzina	Volga Federal District	14.350	12.900	13.150	12.400	52.800
12	Alyona Polyan	Volga Federal District	14.150	11.050	13.500	13.850	52.550
13	Ekaterina Baturina	Southern Federal District	13.500	12.400	12.850	12.600	51.350
14	Lilia Akhaimova	Saint Petersburg	13.850	11.950	12.550	12.550	50.900
15	Maria Smirnova	Volga Federal District	14.350	10.850	12.250	13.000	50.450
16	Marina Nekrasova	Central Federal District	13.900	11.100	12.600	12.250	49.850
17	Anna Myzdrikova	Moscow	14.100	11.200	12.300	12.100	49.700
18	Anastasia Cheong	Saint Petersburg	13.800	10.550	12.800	12.300	49.450
19	Maria Nechaeva	Siberian Federal District	13.100	11.650	12.500	11.950	49.200
20	Kristina Kruglikova	Central Federal District	14.350	11.600	11.900	11.250	49.100
21	Maria Dunayeva	St. Petersburg / Northwest	13.450	10.950	12.400	12.250	49.050
22	Yuna Nefedova	Central Federal District	13.450	11.950	11.900	11.250	48.550
23	Anastasia Osetrova	Southern Federal District	13.900	11.850	11.950	10.850	48.550
24	Daria Anishina	Northwestern Federal District	14.050	11.550	10.400	12.400	48.400
25	Tatiana Kirilova	Northwestern Federal District	12.800	12.050	12.200	11.000	48.050
26	Eleonora Goryunova	Northwestern Federal District	14.100	9.950	11.400	12.450	47.900
27	Alla Sidorenko	Saint Petersburg	12.950	10.550	11.900	12.200	47.600
28	Yulia Chemareva	Central Federal District	13.000	10.200	11.800	12.550	47.550
29	Irina Yashina	Volga Federal District	12.700	13.000	10.250	11.550	47.500
30	Maria Silyukova	Volga Federal District	12.950	10.800	11.200	12.300	47.250
31	Anna Vanyushkina	Northwestern Federal District	13.500	10.350	10.950	12.200	47.000
32	Viktoria Shmidt	Volga Federal District	12.550	9.250	12.250	12.450	46.500
33	Natalia Medvedeva	Southern Federal District	13.450	9.550	10.900	12.500	46.400
34	Irina Voropayeva	Central Federal District	13.700	8.600	11.550	12.450	46.300
35	Ekaterina Shtronda	Siberian Federal District	11.900	10.800	12.450	10.550	45.700
36	Nailya Mustafina	Moscow	12.900	7.900	12.300	12.000	45.100
37	Irina Andreeva	Southern Federal District	13.450	8.100	11.150	11.950	44.650
38	Diana Ravdina	Saint Petersburg	14.150	8.050	10.550	11.850	44.600
39	Olga Tyo	Siberian Federal District	12.250	9.150	12.200	10.600	44.200
40	Anna Solomeina	Southern Federal District	12.950	8.950	11.400	10.250	43.550
41	Ekaterina Tsvetkova	Central Federal District	14.050	8.100	10.350	10.850	43.350
42	Francheska Yanayeva	Southern Federal District	13.650	7.650	9.700	12.050	43.050
43	Maria Popova	Southern Federal District	12.800	7.700	10.650	9.850	41.000
44	Elena Klyuchkova	Southern Federal District	11.900	9.450	9.200	10.300	40.850
45	Valeria Golenisheva	Southern Federal District	10.100	9.450	9.900	11.150	40.600
46	Elena Tyapkova	Southern Federal District	12.700	8.350	8.350	10.050	39.450
47	Anastasia Marchuk	Moscow	-	13.350	12.450	12.550	38.350
48	Anastasia Kuznetsova	Southern Federal District	12.400	7.400	7.400	10.600	37.800
49	Maria Paseka	Moscow	15.250	14.100	-	-	29.350
50	Tatiana Nabieva	Saint Petersburg	14.250	13.900	-	-	28.150
51	Kristina Sidorova	Volga Federal District	-	7.900	-	11.850	19.750

=== Vault Final ===
Rank	Gymnast	Represent	Total
1st place, gold medalist(s)	Maria Paseka	Moscow	13.475
2nd place, silver medalist(s)	Kristina Kruglikova	Central Federal District	13.400
3rd place, bronze medalist(s)	Anna Pavlova	Central Federal District	13.050
4	Olga Bikmurzina	Volga Federal District	12.750
5	Alyona Polyan	Volga Federal District	12.625
6	Maria Smirnova	Volga Federal District	12.225
7	Anna Myzdrikova	Moscow	12.175
8	Ekaterina Tsvetkova	Central Federal District	11.300

=== Uneven Bars Final ===
Rank	Gymnast	Represent	Total
1st place, gold medalist(s)	Anastasia Grishina	Moscow	15.100
2nd place, silver medalist(s)	Tatiana Nabieva	Saint Petersburg	14.625
3rd place, bronze medalist(s)	Aliya Mustafina	Moscow	14.550
4	Anna Dementyeva	Central / Volga	13.975
5	Evgeniya Shelgunova	Central / Volga	13.625
6	Kristina Goryunova	Northwest Federal District	13.525
7	Alla Sosnitskaya	Moscow	13.500
8	Maria Paseka	Moscow	11.725

=== Balance Beam Final ===
Rank	Gymnast	Represent	Total
1st place, gold medalist(s)	Evgeniya Shelgunova	Central / Volga	14.050
2nd place, silver medalist(s)	Polina Fedorova	Volga Federal District	13.900
3rd place, bronze medalist(s)	Ksenia Afanasyeva	Central Federal District	13.775
4	Anna Dementyeva	Central / Volga	13.400
5	Anna Pavlova	Central Federal District	13.275
5	Kristina Goryunova	Northwest Federal District	13.275
7	Ekaterina Kramarenko	Saint Petersburg	12.800
8	Alyona Polyan	Volga Federal District	11.725

=== Floor Exercise Final ===
Rank	Gymnast	Represent	Total
1st place, gold medalist(s)	Ksenia Afanasyeva	Central Federal District	13.600
2nd place, silver medalist(s)	Kristina Goryunova	Northwest Federal District	13.525
3rd place, bronze medalist(s)	Alyona Polyan	Volga Federal District	13.075
4	Anna Pavlova	Central Federal District	13.000
5	Evgeniya Shelgunova	Central / Volga	12.900
6	Anna Dementyeva	Central / Volga	12.625
7	Maria Smirnova	Volga Federal District	11.950
8	Polina Fedorova	Volga Federal District	11.800
