= Tadao Uesako =

Japanese gymnast

- 上迫 忠夫
- Born: 14 October 1921 Hamada, Shimane, Empire of Japan
- Died: 20 October 1986 (aged 65)

Gymnastics career
- Discipline: Men's artistic gymnastics
- Country represented: Japan
Medal record
Men's artistic gymnastics
Representing Japan
Olympic Games
Silver medal – second place	1952 Helsinki	Floor
Bronze medal – third place	1952 Helsinki	Vault

Tadao Uesako (上迫 忠夫, Uesako Tadao; 14 October 1921 – 20 October 1986) was a Japanese gymnast who competed in the 1952 Summer Olympics.
