= Leo Sotorník =

- Leo_Sotorník circa 1950

Personal information
- Born: 11 April 1926 Ostrava, Czechoslovakia
- Died: 14 March 1998 (aged 71) Prague, Czech Republic

Gymnastics career
- Discipline: Men's artistic gymnastics
- Country represented: Czechoslovakia
Medal record
Representing Czechoslovakia
Olympic Games
Bronze medal – third place	1948 London	Horse vault
World Championships
Gold medal – first place	1954 Budapest	Vault

Leo Sotorník (11 April 1926 – 14 March 1998) was a Czech gymnast who competed in the 1948 Summer Olympics and in the 1952 Summer Olympics, as well as the 1950 World Artistic Gymnastics Championships and 1954 World Artistic Gymnastics Championships.
