= Masao Takemoto =

Japanese gymnast (1919–2007)

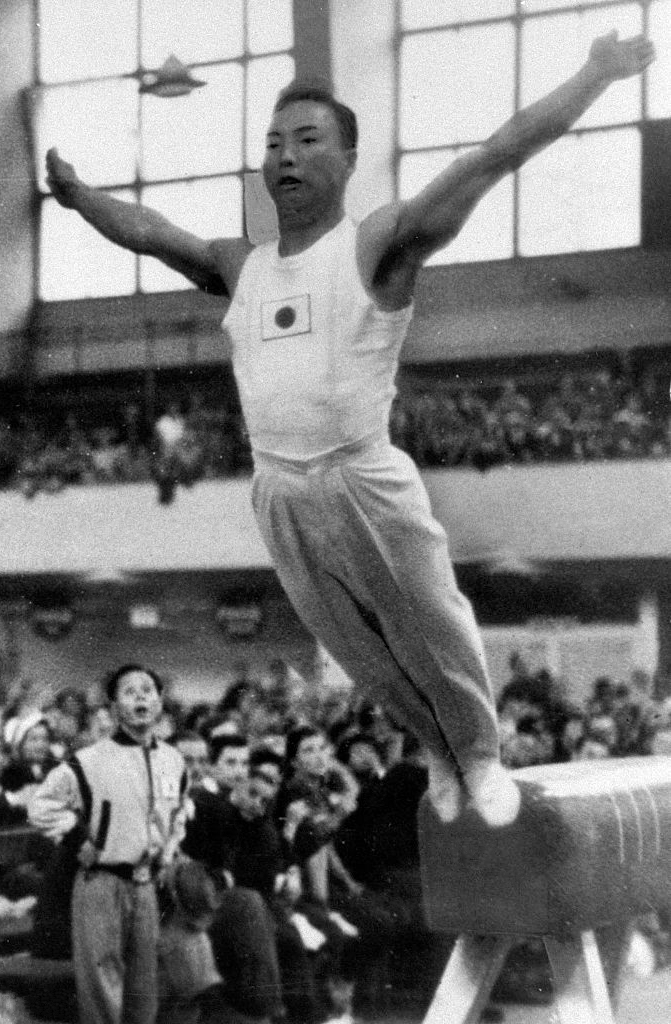
- Takemoto at the 1952 Olympics

Personal information
- Born: September 29, 1919 Hamada, Shimane, Japan
- Died: February 2, 2007 (aged 87) Kanagawa, Shimane, Japan
- Height: 160 cm (5 ft 3 in)

Gymnastics career
- Discipline: Men's artistic gymnastics
- Country represented: Japan
Medal record
Olympic Games
Silver medal – second place	1952 Helsinki	Vault
Silver medal – second place	1956 Melbourne	Team
Bronze medal – third place	1956 Melbourne	Horizontal bar
Bronze medal – third place	1956 Melbourne	Parallel bars
Bronze medal – third place	1956 Melbourne	Rings
Gold medal – first place	1960 Rome	Team
Silver medal – second place	1960 Rome	Horizontal bar
World Championships
Gold medal – first place	1954 Rome	Floor
Silver medal – second place	1954 Rome	Team
Bronze medal – third place	1954 Rome	Parallel bars
Gold medal – first place	1958 Moscow	Floor
Silver medal – second place	1958 Moscow	Team
Silver medal – second place	1958 Moscow	Vault
Bronze medal – third place	1958 Moscow	Horizontal bar

Masao Takemoto (竹本正男, Takemoto Masao; September 29, 1919 – February 2, 2007) was a Japanese artistic gymnast who won two world titles and seven Olympic medals.

At the 1952 Summer Olympics he won the silver medal in the vault with a score of 19.150, which was 0.050 short of the gold medal. Two years later he became world champion in the floor exercise, sharing the first placed with Valentin Muratov; he also won a silver medal with the Japanese team and a bronze at the parallel bars. At the 1956 Summer Olympics Takemoto won three bronze medals: in the horizontal bar, parallel bars and rings; he also received a silver medal as part of the Japanese team. His main skills were on the floor exercise and he proved it once again at the 1958 World Artistic Gymnastics Championships, where he successfully defended his title; he also won silver medals in the vault and team event, as well as a bronze medal in the horizontal bar. At the 1960 Summer Olympics Takemoto won a team gold medal and placed second in the horizontal bar.

Takemoto had a degree in physical education from Nippon Sport Science University and later coached the national gymnastics team. In 1997 he was inducted into the International Gymnastics Hall of Fame. He died from cholangiocarcinoma on 2 February 2007 at the age of 87 in Kanagawa.
