= Orlando Polmonari =

Italian gymnast

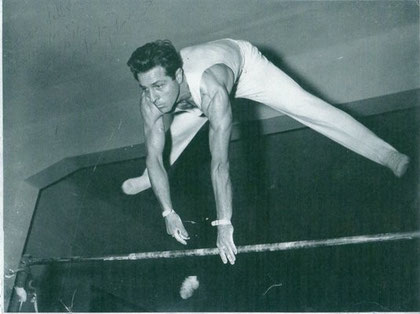

Personal information
- Born: 11 March 1924 Ferrara, Kingdom of Italy
- Died: 27 August 2014 (aged 90) Ferrara, Italy

Gymnastics career
- Discipline: Men's artistic gymnastics
- Country represented: Italy
- Club: Palestra Ginnastica Ferrara
Medal record
Men's artistic gymnastics
Representing Italy
Olympic Games
Bronze medal – third place	1960 Rome	Team

Orlando Polmonari (11 March 1924 – 27 August 2014) was an Italian gymnast. He won a bronze medal in the all-around with the Italian national team at the 1960 Summer Olympics. He was born and died in Ferrara, Italy.
