= Helmut Bantz =

German gymnast (1921–2004)

- Born: 14 September 1921 Speyer, Weimar Republic
- Died: 3 October 2004 (aged 83) Brauweiler, Germany

Gymnastics career
- Discipline: Men's artistic gymnastics
- Country represented: West Germany
- Club: LTV Wuppertal; KT 43 Köln
Medal record
Representing Germany
Olympic Games
Gold medal – first place	1956 Melbourne	Vault
Representing West Germany
World Championships
Silver medal – second place	1954 Rome	Vault
Silver medal – second place	1954 Rome	Horizontal bar
Bronze medal – third place	1954 Rome	Parallel bars
European Championships
Gold medal – first place	1955 Frankfurt am Main	Parallel bars
Silver medal – second place	1955 Frankfurt am Main	Vault
Silver medal – second place	1955 Frankfurt am Main	Rings
Bronze medal – third place	1955 Frankfurt am Main	Allround

Helmut Bantz (14 September 1921 – 3 October 2004) was a German gymnast and Olympic champion. He won a gold medal in the vault at the 1956 Summer Olympics in Melbourne, competing for the United Team of Germany.

Having fought for Germany in World War II, Bantz was captured by the British forces in 1944 and taken to England. After he had been released from the status of prisoner-of-war in 1948, he stayed in England to find a job in agriculture. A couple of months later, Bantz acted as the unofficial coach of the British men's gymnastic team during the 1948 Summer Olympics in London. Among those he coached were Frank Turner and George Weedon.

Bantz then returned to Germany and competed in all artistic gymnastics events at the 1952 and 1956 Olympics. He won two silver and one bronze medals at the 1954 World Artistic Gymnastics Championships, as well as four medals at the 1955 European Men's Artistic Gymnastics Championships. After retiring as a gymnast, Bantz worked in Cologne as a gymnastics coach at high schools and the German Sport University.

Bantz married Erika; they had two daughters, Sabine and Susanne, and a son, Rainer. Since the 1980s, he suffered from health problems and had a heart attack in 1981, back surgery in 1984, and leg amputation due to circulatory disorders in 1994, followed by another leg amputation. He died in 2004 after a long illness.
