= Alena Chadimová =

Czech gymnast (born 1931)

Personal information
- Born: 22 November 1931 (age 94) Olomouc, Czechoslovakia
Medal record
Women's artistic gymnastics
Representing Czechoslovakia
Olympic Games
Bronze medal – third place	1952 Helsinki	Team

Alena Chadimová (born 22 November 1931) is a Czech former gymnast who competed for Czechoslovakia in the 1952 Summer Olympics. She was born in Olomouc.
