= Sofia Muratova =

Soviet gymnast

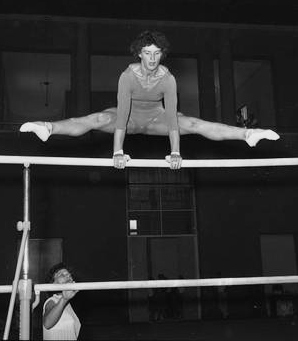
- Muratova at the 1960 Summer Olympics

Personal information
- Full name: Sofia Ivanovna Muratova
- Born: 13 July 1929 Leningrad, Russian SFSR, Soviet Union
- Died: 27 September 2006 (aged 77) Moscow, Russia
- Height: 160 cm (5 ft 3 in)

Gymnastics career
- Discipline: Women's artistic gymnastics
- Country represented: Soviet Union
- Club: Dynamo Moscow
Medal record
Olympic Games
Gold medal – first place	1956 Melbourne	Team
Gold medal – first place	1960 Rome	Team
Silver medal – second place	1960 Rome	All-Around
Silver medal – second place	1960 Rome	Vault
Bronze medal – third place	1956 Melbourne	Team PA
Bronze medal – third place	1956 Melbourne	All-Around
Bronze medal – third place	1956 Melbourne	Uneven Bars
Bronze medal – third place	1960 Rome	Balance Beam
World Championships
Gold medal – first place	1954 Rome	Team
Gold medal – first place	1958 Moscow	Team
Gold medal – first place	1962 Prague	Team
Silver medal – second place	1958 Moscow	Vault
Silver medal – second place	1958 Moscow	Balance Beam

Sofia Ivanovna Muratova (Russian: Софья Ивановна Муратова, 13 July 1929 – 27 September 2006) was a Soviet gymnast. She competed in the 1956 and 1960 Olympics and won eight medals.

== Early life ==
Muratova grew up in Leningrad and lost her mother during its siege. Muratova herself was evacuated from the city in 1941. During the war she could not regularly attend school, but tried to train every day. She took up artistic gymnastics in 1943, entering a children's sports school, and just three months later competed in the Russian Championships for girls. In 1944 she moved to Moscow, where she trained under Ivan Zhuravlyov.

== First successes ==
In 1945 Muratova won her first major competition, the USSR Junior Championships. She soon became one of the strongest Soviet gymnasts, the only one to win five Soviet all-around titles, yet she was often unlucky at major international events.

== World championships and Olympics ==
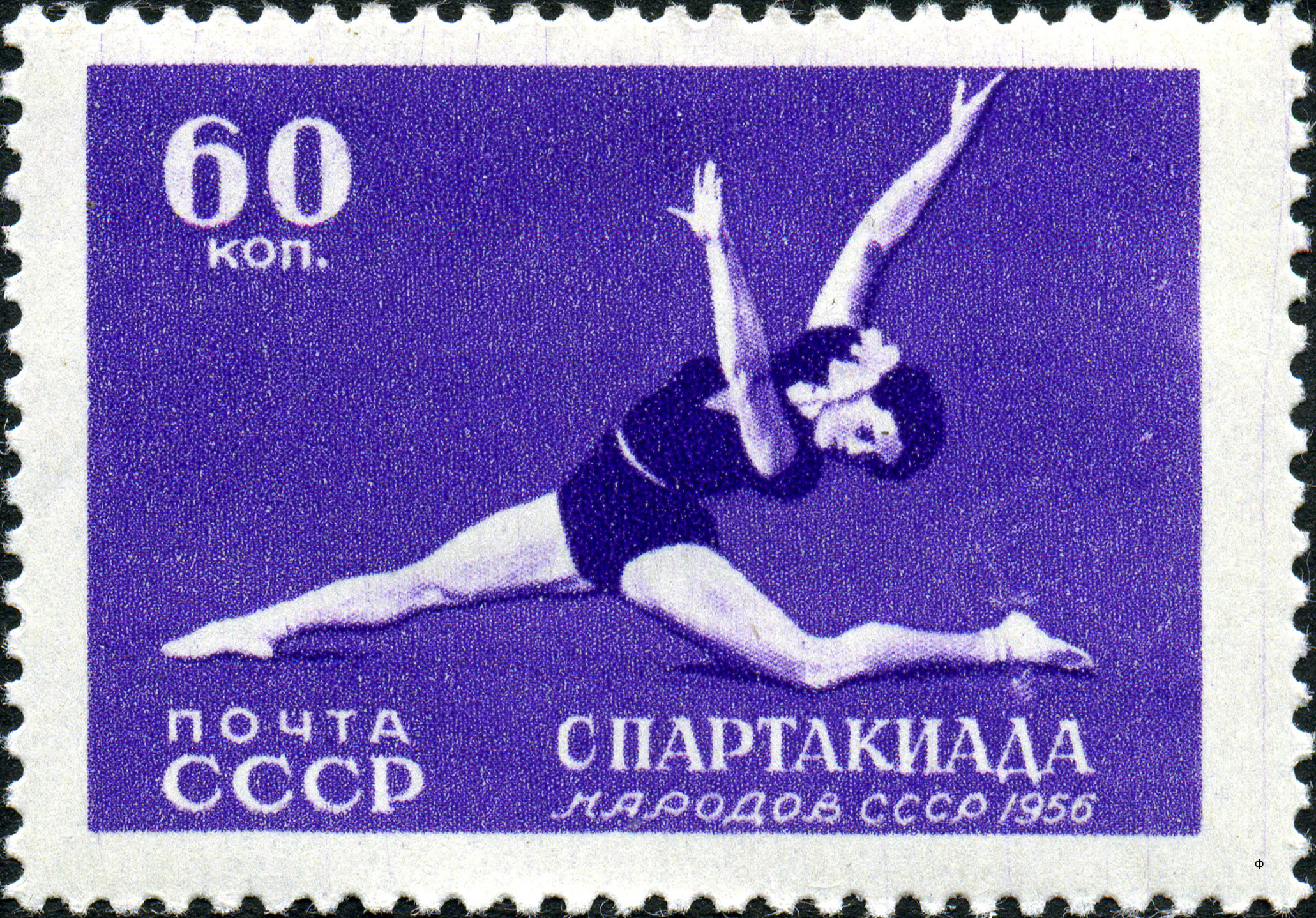
1956 Soviet stamp, depicting Sofia Muratova on the floor.

Muratova missed the 1952 Summer Olympics due to injury. Two years later, at the 1954 World Artistic Gymnastics Championships, she won a gold medal in the team competition and led the all-around contest, but broke her arm during a warm-up and had to withdraw from the championship. Her husband Valentin Muratov swore to win a gold medal for her and became the all-around champion. She debuted at the 1956 Summer Olympics, winning the team gold and two bronze medals, all-around and on the uneven bars. At the rather unsuccessful 1958 World Artistic Gymnastics Championships in Moscow Muratova won the team gold and two bronzes on vault and balance beam. Injuries haunted her on the way to the 1960 Summer Olympics, but with the help from Zoya Mironova, who operated on Muratova just three months before the Olympics, she managed to recover and even win three medals — the team gold, all-around silver and bronze on the balance beam. She presented her gold medal to Mironova as a token of gratitude. Her two Olympic all-around medals (1956, 1960) were a rare feat accomplished by only eight other women gymnasts.

Muratova won seven all-around national titles, including the inaugural 1955 USSR Cup. She retired in 1965 and worked as a coach for 34 years. She was the head coach of the Soviet women's gymnastics team at the 1968 Olympics. Earlier in 1957 she was awarded the Order of the Red Banner of Labour. Muratova died on 27 September 2006. Her husband Valentin Muratov died on 6 October of the same year.

== Achievements (non-Olympic) ==
Year	Event	AA	Team	VT	UB	BB	FX	R
1949	USSR Championships			1st			2nd	
1950	USSR Championships			1st		1st	2nd	
1951	USSR Championships	3rd						
1954	World Championships		1st					
1954	USSR Championships	1st			1st	2nd		2nd
1955	USSR Championships	1st			1st	3rd	1st	
1955	USSR Cup	1st						
1956	USSR Championships	2nd			1st	3rd		
1957	USSR Championships	1st		1st	1st	1st	2nd	
1958	World Championships		1st	2nd		2nd		
1958	USSR Championships	2nd		1st	3rd		3rd	
1959	USSR Championships	2nd		1st	2nd			
1960	USSR Championships	1st			3rd	1st		
1962	World Championships		1st					
1962	USSR Championships	2nd						
1963	USSR Championships	1st		3rd	3rd	2nd		
1963	USSR Cup	2nd			2nd	3rd		
1964	USSR Championships				2nd	3rd		
1964	USSR Cup	1st						

== See also ==
- List of multiple Summer Olympic medalists
