= Adalbert Dickhut =

Artistic gymnast

- Born: 16 May 1923 Dortmund, Weimar Republic
- Died: 5 April 1995 (aged 71) Rüsselsheim, Germany

Gymnastics career
- Discipline: Men's artistic gymnastics
- Country represented: West Germany
- Gym: Kölner Turnerschaft von 1843
Medal record
Men's artistic gymnastics
Representing West Germany
European Championships
Gold medal – first place	1955 Frankfurt	Vault
Bronze medal – third place	1955 Frankfurt	Floor

Adalbert Dickhut (16 May 1923 – 5 April 1995) was a German gymnast. He competed at the 1952 Summer Olympics in all artistic gymnastics events and finished fourth with the German team. His best individual achievement was ninth place on the vault. He won this event at the 1955 European Men's Artistic Gymnastics Championships.
