= Valentin Muratov =

Soviet gymnast

Personal information
- Born: 30 July 1928 Moscow Oblast, Russian SFSR, Soviet Union
- Died: 6 October 2006 (aged 78) Moscow, Russia

Gymnastics career
- Discipline: Men's artistic gymnastics
- Country represented: Soviet Union
- Club: Iskra Moscow (1948–54); Burevestnik Moscow (1955–58)
Medal record
Representing the Soviet Union
Olympic Games
Gold medal – first place	1952 Helsinki	Team
Gold medal – first place	1956 Melbourne	Floor exercise
Gold medal – first place	1956 Melbourne	Vault
Gold medal – first place	1956 Melbourne	Team
Silver medal – second place	1956 Melbourne	Rings
World Championships
Gold medal – first place	1954 Rome	Team
Gold medal – first place	1954 Rome	Horizontal bar
Gold medal – first place	1954 Rome	All-around
Gold medal – first place	1954 Rome	Floor exercise
Gold medal – first place	1958 Moscow	Team
Bronze medal – third place	1954 Rome	Rings

Valentin Ivanovich Muratov (Russian: Валентин Иванович Муратов, 30 July 1928 – 6 October 2006) was a Soviet gymnast and gymnastics coach. He competed at the 1952 and 1956 Olympics in all artistic gymnastics event and won four gold and one silver medal. He also won four gold medals at the 1954 world championships, sharing the all-around gold medal with Viktor Chukarin and the floor gold medal with Masao Takemoto.

== Biography ==
Muratov's father worked at a munitions factory in Moscow; he volunteered to fight in World War II and went missing in action in 1942. Valentin then took his place at the munitions factory to support his mother. After the war ended, he went back to school, where he was introduced to gymnastics.

In 1951, Muratov married Sofia Muratova, a fellow Olympic gymnast. They had two sons, Sergei (born 1952) and Andrei (born 1961); Sergei later also became a gymnast and gymnastic coach. The careers of both parents were marred with injuries, which eventually forced them to retire in 1958 and 1964, respectively. They both went into coaching, with Valentin being the head coach of the Soviet team from 1960 to 1968.
