= Yevgeny Korolkov =

Soviet gymnast (1930–2014)

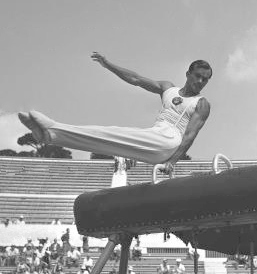
- Korolkov at the 1954 World Championships

Personal information
- Born: 9 October 1930 Moscow, Russian SFSR, Soviet Union
- Died: 23 December 2014 (aged 84)

Gymnastics career
- Discipline: Men's artistic gymnastics
- Country represented: Soviet Union
- Club: Dynamo Moscow
Medal record
Olympic Games
Gold medal – first place	1952 Helsinki	Team
Silver medal – second place	1952 Helsinki	Pommel horse
World Championships
Gold medal – first place	1954 Rome	Team
Silver medal – second place	1954 Rome	Rings

Yevgeny Viktorovich Korolkov (Russian: Евгений Викторович Корольков; 9 Octo ber 1930 – 23 December 2014) was a Soviet gymnast who competed at the 1952 Summer Olympics. He won a gold medal in the team competitions and a silver in the pommel horse. Similarly, at the 1954 World Championships he won a team gold and a silver on the rings. After retiring from competitions he worked as a gymnastics coach in Moscow. His trainees included Mikhail Voronin and Sergey Diomidov.
