= France women's national artistic gymnastics team =

France
- Continental union: European Union of Gymnastics
- National federation: France Gymnastics Federation

Olympic Games
- Appearances: 14

World Championships
- Medals: Silver: 1950; Bronze: 2023

European Championships
- Medals: Silver: 2018; Bronze: 2008, 2016, 2024, 2025, 2026

Junior World Championships
- Appearances: 3
- Medals: Gold: 2025

Youth Olympic Games
- Medals: Bronze: 2026

The France women's national artistic gymnastics team represents France in FIG international competitions.

== History ==
France has participated in the Olympic Games women's team competition 15 times.

== 2026 senior roster ==
Name	Birth date and age	Birthplace	Club	Training location
Sarah Ardrino	January 1, 2008 (age 18)	Toulouse	Étoile Gymnique de Colomiers	INSEP
Noélie Ayuso	July 29, 2009 (age 17)	Montceau-les-Mines	Montceau Gym	Pôle France de Saint-Etienne
Lorette Charpy	December 3, 2001 (age 24)	Annonay	Indépendante Stéphanoise	SA Mérignac Gymnastique
Elena Colas	May 1, 2010 (age 16)	Anger	Avoine Beaumont Gymnastique	Avoine Beaumont Gymnastique
Juliette Certain	October 9, 2009 (age 17)	Obernai	Obernai Gymnastique	INSEP
Lola Chassat	April 12, 2010 (age 16)	Cournon d'Auvergne	Cournon d'Auvergne Gymnastique	Pole France de Saint-Etienne
Mélanie de Jesus dos Santos	March 5, 2000 (age 26)	Schœlcher, Martinique	Kreyol Gym	Kreyol Gym
Coline Devillard	October 9, 2000 (age 26)	Saint-Vallier	Meaux Gymnastique	INSEP
Romane Hamelin	March 8, 2009 (age 17)	Brive-la-Gaillarde	Brive Gym	Pôle France de Saint-Etienne
Lilly Havard	February 11, 2008 (age 18)	Falaise	La Saint Loise Gymnastique	La Saint Loise Gymnastique
Alizée Letrange Mouakit	September 18, 2004 (age 22)	Strasbourg	SG Brumath	Pôle France de Saint-Etienne
Astria Nelo	January 1, 2009 (age 17)	Chelles	Meaux Gymnastique	INSEP
Morgane Osyssek	December 15, 2002 (age 23)	Colmar	Union Haguenau	INSEP
Noémie Pages	May 25, 2009 (age 17)	Toulouse	Etoile Gymnique de Colomiers	Etoile Gymnique de Colomiers
Lana Pondart	July 5, 2008 (age 18)	Rochefort	Union Haguenau	INSEP
Maïana Prat	April 11, 2010 (age 16)	Bordeaux	SA Mérignac Gymnastique	SA Mérignac Gymnastique
Célia Serber	August 13, 2003 (age 23)	Dijon	Alliance Dijon 21	INSEP
Ming van Eijken	April 3, 2008 (age 18)	Hong-Kong	Gym'Dans'Francheville	Pôle France de Saint-Etienne
Lilou Viallat	January 25, 2008 (age 18)	Lyon	Independente Kingerseim	INSEP

== Team competition results ==
=== Olympic Games ===
France has fielded a team at 15 Olympic Games; below are the results. They boycotted the 1980 Olympic Games.

Year	Position	Squad
1928	5th place	Mathilde Bataille, Honorine Delescluse, Louise Delescluse, Galuëlle Dhont, Valentine Héméryck, Paulette Houtéer, Georgette Meulebroeck, Renée Oger, Antonie Straeteman, Jeanne Vanoverloop, Berthe Verstraete, Geneviève Vankiersbilck
1948	10th place	Gisèle Guibert, Colette Hué, Christine Palau, Irène Pittelioen, Jeanine Touchard, Florence Vallée, Jeanette Vogelbacher, Martine Yvinou
1952	12th place	Ginette Durand, Colette Fanara, Colette Hué, Madeleine Jouffroy, Alexandra Lemoine, Liliane Montagne, Irène Pittelioen, Jeanette Vogelbacher
1960	12th place	Anne-Marie Demortière, Jacqueline Dieudonné, Renée Hugon, Paulette le Raer, Monique Rossi, Danièle Sicot-Coulon
1968	7th place	Nicole Bourdiau, Jacqueline Brisepierre, Mireille Cayre, Dominique Lauvard, Evelyne Letourneur, Françoise Nourry
1972	15th place	Nadine Audin, Mireille Cayre, Catherine Daugé, Elvire Gertosio, Pascale Hermant, Véronique Tilmont
1992	8th place	Karine Boucher, Karine Charlier, Marie-Angéline Colson, Virginie Machado, Chloé Maigre, Jenny Rolland
1996	8th place	Cécile Canqueteau, Ludivine Furnon, Laure Gély, Isabelle Severino, Elvire Teza, Orélie Troscompt, Émilie Volle
2000	8th place	Anne-Sophie Endeler, Ludivine Furnon, Nelly Ramassamy, Delphine Regease, Alexandra Soler, Elvire Teza
2004	6th place	Coralie Chacon, Soraya Chaouch, Marine Debauve, Émilie Le Pennec, Camille Schmutz, Isabelle Severino
2008	7th place	Rose-Eliandre Bellemare, Marine Debauve, Laetitia Dugain, Katheleen Lindor, Pauline Morel, Marine Petit
2012	11th place	Mira Boumejmajen, Youna Dufournet, Anne Kuhm, Aurelie Malaussena, Sophia Serseri
2016	11th place	Marine Boyer, Marine Brevet, Loan His, Oréane Lechenault, Louise Vanhille
2020	6th place	Marine Boyer, Mélanie de Jesus dos Santos, Aline Friess, Carolann Héduit
2024	11th place	Marine Boyer, Mélanie de Jesus dos Santos, Coline Devillard, Morgane Osyssek, Ming van Eijken

=== World Championships ===
Year	Position	Squad
1934	4th place	Allain, Bourrier, Esposito, Guenerin, Montané, Paon, Ramos, Tarillon
1950	Silver medal	Ginette Durand, Colette Hué, Madeleine Jouffroy, Alexandra Lemoine, Liliane Montagne, Christine Palau, Irène Pittelioen, Jeanette Vogelbacher
1954	9th place	Jacqueline Dieudonné, Monique Gally, Renée Hugon, Madeleine Jouffroy, Alexandra Lemoine, Liliane Montagne, Christiane Richardot, Danièle Sicot-Coulon
1958	10th place	Anne-Marie Demortière, Jacqueline Dieudonné, Arlette Gilbert, Annie Glanchar, Renée Hugon, Danièle Sicot-Coulon
1962	12th place	Annie Ange, Jacqueline Dieudonné, Renée Hugon, Paulette Le Raer, Michéle Melenec, Danièle Sicot-Coulon
1966	7th place	Pierrette Aymar, Jacqueline Brisepierre, Mireille Cayre, Dominique Lauvard, Huguette Leguet, Evelyne Letourneur
1970	14th place	Chantal Challe, Nicole de Santi, Anne Flescher, Dominique Lauvard, Sylvie Peteau, Chantal Puard
1974	14th place	Nadine Audin, Catherine Boulet, Catherine Daugé, Pascale Hermant, Patricia Olszakowski, Chantal Seggiaro
1978	12th place	Martine Audin, Nadine Audin, Valérie Fiandrino, Anne Hervé, Martine Pidoux, Véronique Sanguinetti
1979	15th place	Béatrice Doucet, Valérie Fiandrino, Valérie Grandjean, Anne Hervé, Martine Pidoux, Véronique Sanguinetti
1983	16th place	Sophie Bernard, Véronique Guillemot, Patricia Martin, Valérie Micheli, Cécile Pellerin, Sandrine Vacher
1985	18th place	Sophie Darrigade, Nathalie Donati, Carole Grison, Véronique Guillemot, Florence Laborderie, Valérie Le Gall
1987	13th place	Anne-Marie Bauduin, Karine Boucher, Sophie Darrigade, Sandrine Livet, Catherine Romano, Sandrine Villanne
1989	13th place	Anne-Marie Bauduin, Karine Boucher, Karine Mermet, Carole Micheli, Ingrid Stutz, Sandrine Villanne
1991	11th place	Karine Boucher, Virginie Machado, Chloé Maigre, Jenny Rolland, Barbara Solans, Ingrid Stutz
1994	7th place	Cécile Canqueteau, Anne Etienne, Laure Gély, Élodie Lussac, Christelle Marconnet, Frédérique Marotte, Carine Muntoni
1995	6th place	Laetitia Bégué, Cécile Canqueteau, Ludivine Furnon, Laure Gély, Isabelle Severino, Elvire Teza, Orélie Troscompt
1997	5th place	Cécile Canqueteau, Ludivine Furnon, Magali Ruffato, Isabelle Severino, Elvire Teza, Émilie Volle
1999	8th place	Anne-Sophie Endeler, Ludivine Furnon, Nelly Ramassamy, Alexandra Soler, Elvire Teza, Émilie Volle
2001	12th place	Clélia Coutzac, Ludivine Furnon, Magaly Hars, Elisa Pasquet, Delphine Regease, Nelly Soupé
2003	10th place	Coralie Chacon, Soraya Chaouch, Marine Debauve, Émilie Le Pennec, Gaelle Richard, Camille Schmutz
2006	10th place	Jenny Kohler, Katheleen Lindor, Lindsay Lindor, Julie Martinez, Erika Morel, Isabelle Severino
2007	6th place	Laetitia Dugain, Katheleen Lindor, Pauline Morel, Marine Petit, Isabelle Severino, Cassy Vericel
2010	11th place	Marine Brevet, Aurélie Malaussena, Eva Maurin, Pauline Morel, Marine Petit
2011	10th place	Rose-Eliandre Bellemare, Marine Brevet, Clara Della Vedova, Youna Dufournet, Aurélie Malaussena, Sophia Serseri
2014	13th place	Mira Boumejmajen, Marine Brevet, Clara Chambellant, Manon Cormoreche, Youna Dufournet, Claire Martin
2015	10th place	Marine Brevet, Loan His, Anne Kuhm, Claire Martin, Valentine Pikul, Louise Vanhille
2018	5th place	Juliette Bossu, Marine Boyer, Lorette Charpy, Mélanie de Jesus dos Santos, Louise Vanhille
2019	5th place	Marine Boyer, Lorette Charpy, Mélanie de Jesus dos Santos, Aline Friess, Claire Pontlevoy
2022	8th place	Marine Boyer, Mélanie de Jesus dos Santos, Coline Devillard, Aline Friess, Carolann Héduit, Morgane Osyssek-Reimer
2023	Bronze medal	Marine Boyer, Lorette Charpy, Mélanie de Jesus dos Santos, Coline Devillard, Morgane Osyssek-Reimer, Djenna Laroui
2026	4th place	Lorette Charpy, Elena Colas, Morgane Osyssek-Reimer, Maïana Prat, Célia Serber, Alizée Letrange

=== Junior World Championships ===
Year	Position	Squad
2019	15th place	Taïs Boura, Maewenn Eugene, Alison Faure, Elise Garcia
2023	11th place	Lana Pondart, Ming van Eijken, Lilou Viallat, Astria Nelo
2025	Gold medal	Lola Chassat, Elena Colas, Maïana Prat, Perla Denéchère

== Most decorated gymnasts ==
This list includes all French female artistic gymnasts who have won a medal at the Olympic Games or the World Artistic Gymnastics Championships.

Rank	Gymnast	Team	AA	VT	UB	BB	FX	Olympic Total	World Total	Total
1	Alexandra Lemoine	1950		1950				0	2	2
2	Coline Devillard	2023		2022				0	2	2
3	Émilie Le Pennec				2004			1	0	1
4	Durand, Hué, Jouffroy, Montagne, Palau, Pittelioen, Vogelbacher	1950						0	1	1
11	Youna Dufournet			2009				0	1	1
11	Ludivine Furnon						1995	0	1	1
11	Isabelle Severino				1996			0	1	1
11	Cassy Vericel						2007	0	1	1
11	Boyer, Charpy, de Jesus dos Santos, Laroui, Osyssek	2023						0	1	1
11	Maïana Prat						2026	0	1	1

== See also ==
- List of Olympic female artistic gymnasts for France
