= List of Olympic female artistic gymnasts for France =

Gymnastics events have been staged at the Olympic Games since 1896. French female gymnasts have participated in every Summer Olympics since 1928, except for 1932, 1936, and 1980. A total of 64 female gymnasts have represented France. French women have won one medal at the Olympics: the 2004 uneven bars gold, which was won by Émilie Le Pennec.

== Gymnasts ==
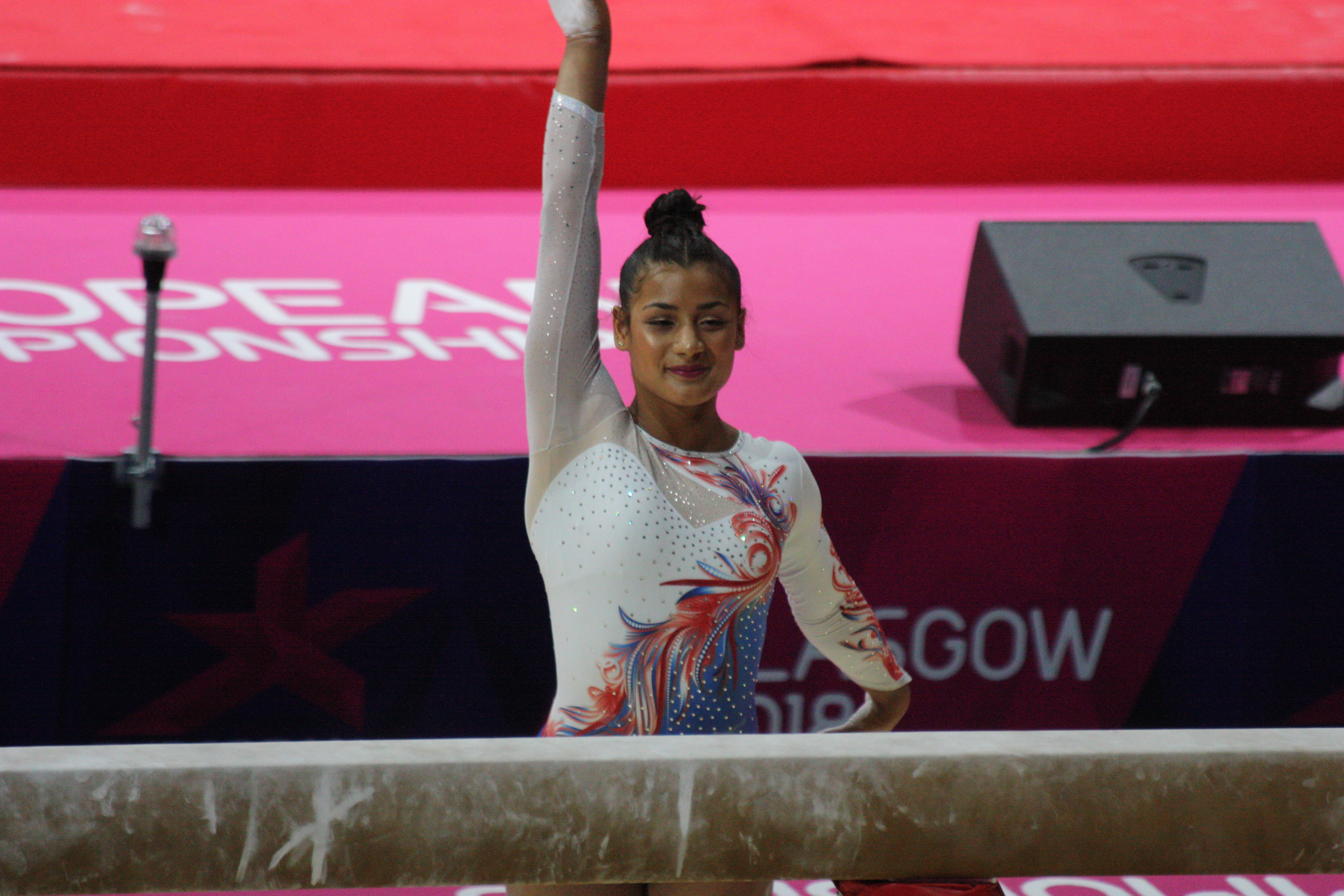
Marine Boyer

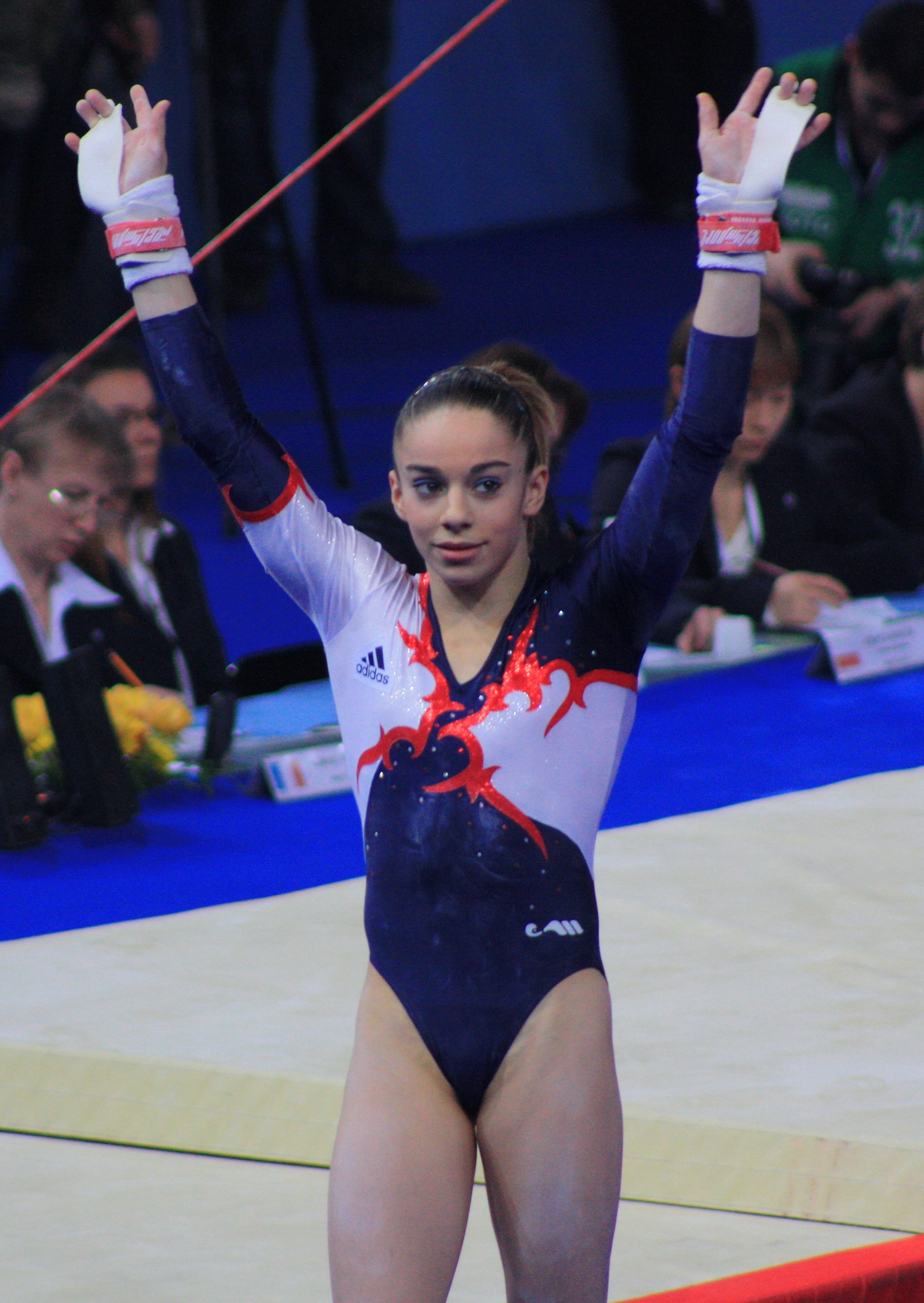
Youna Dufournet

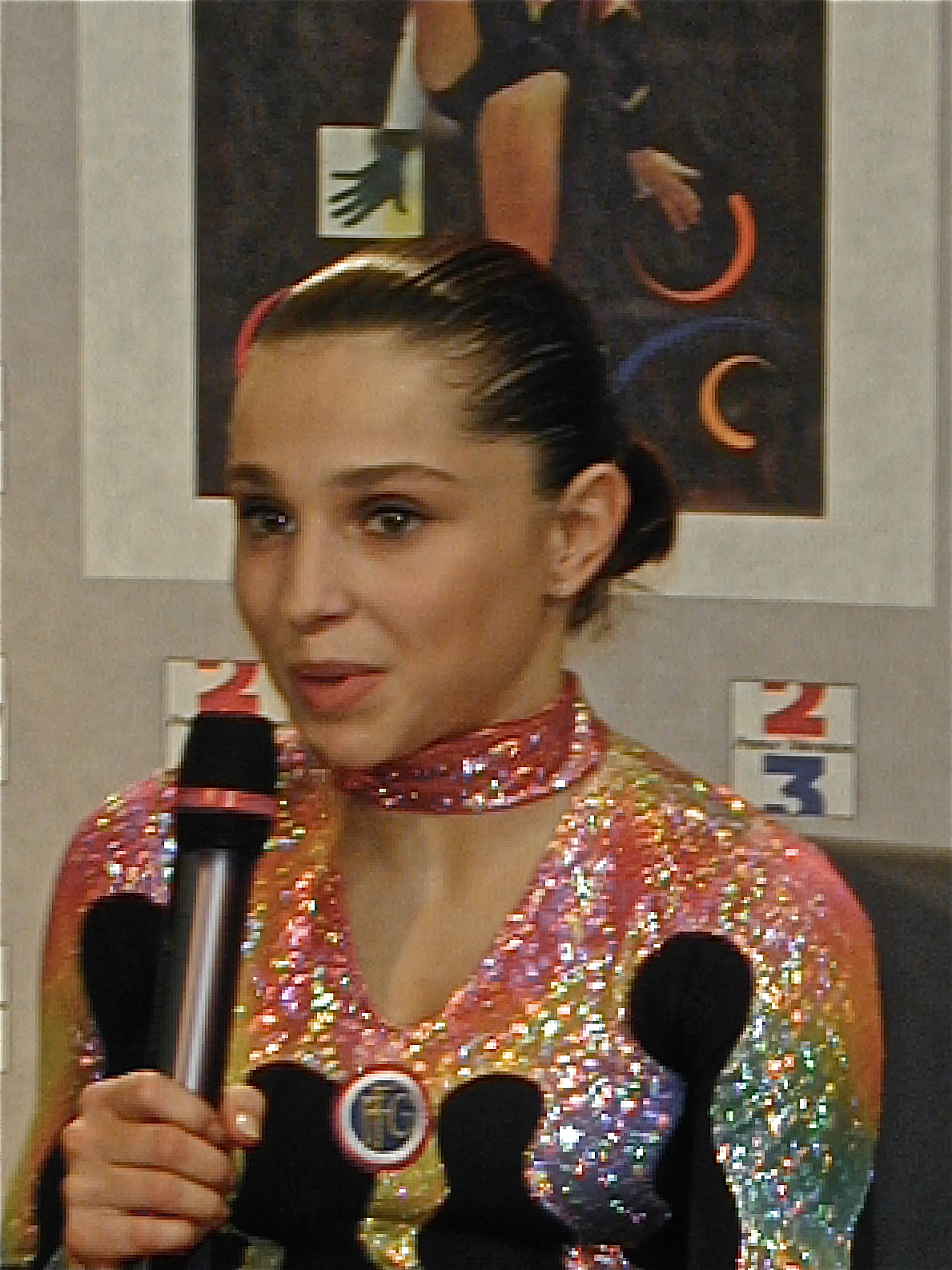
Ludivine Furnon

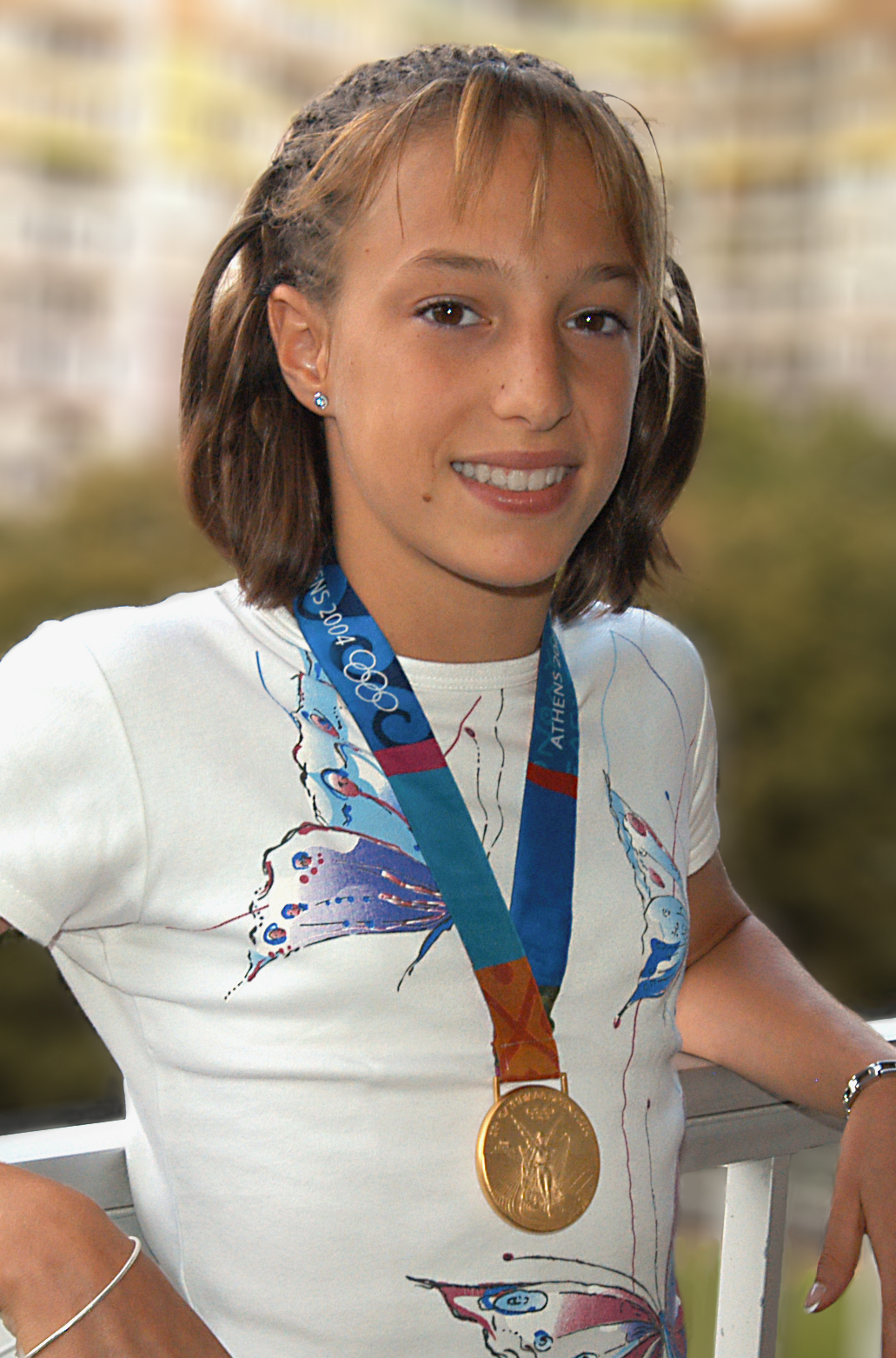
Émilie Le Pennec

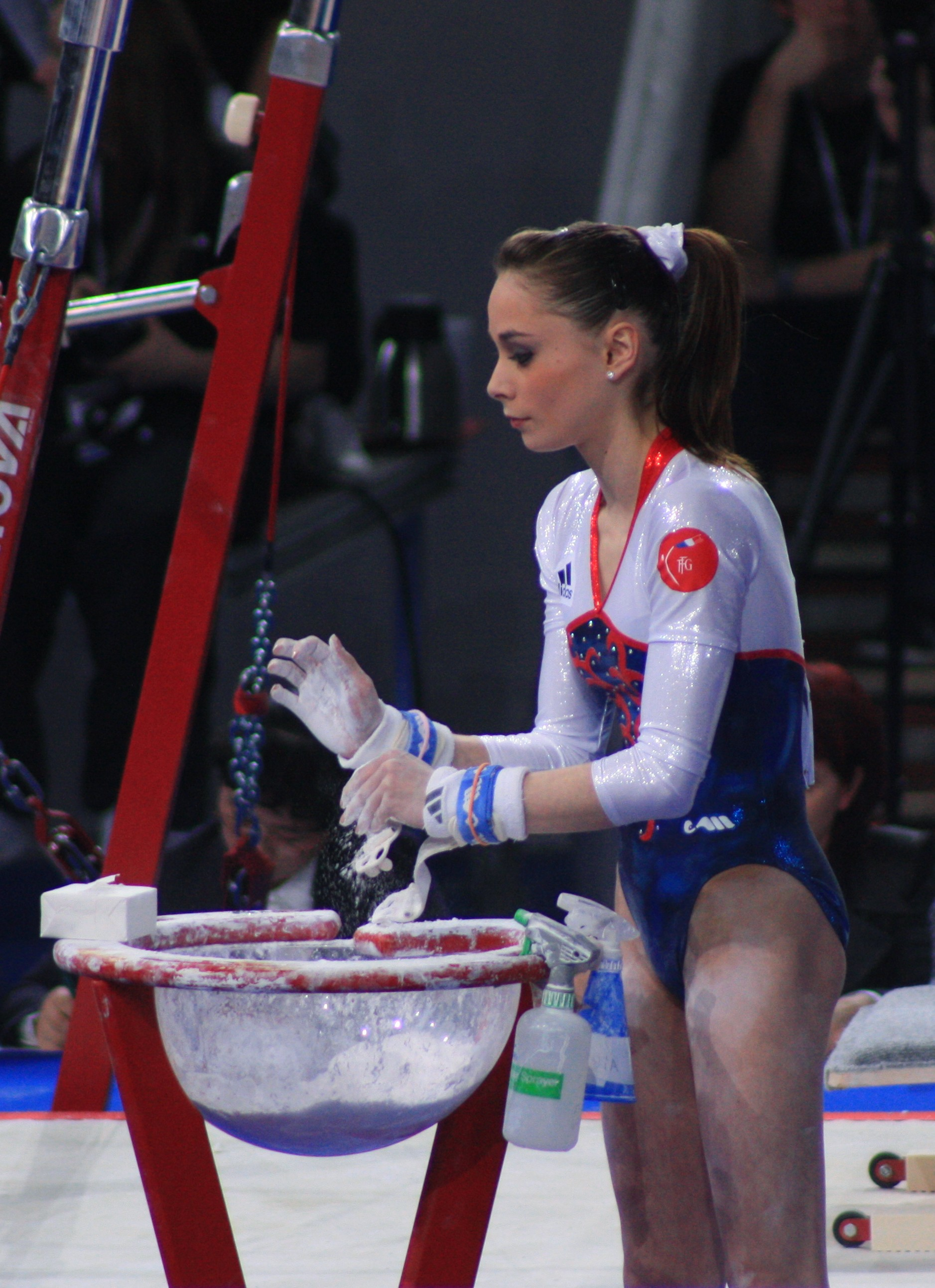
Pauline Morel

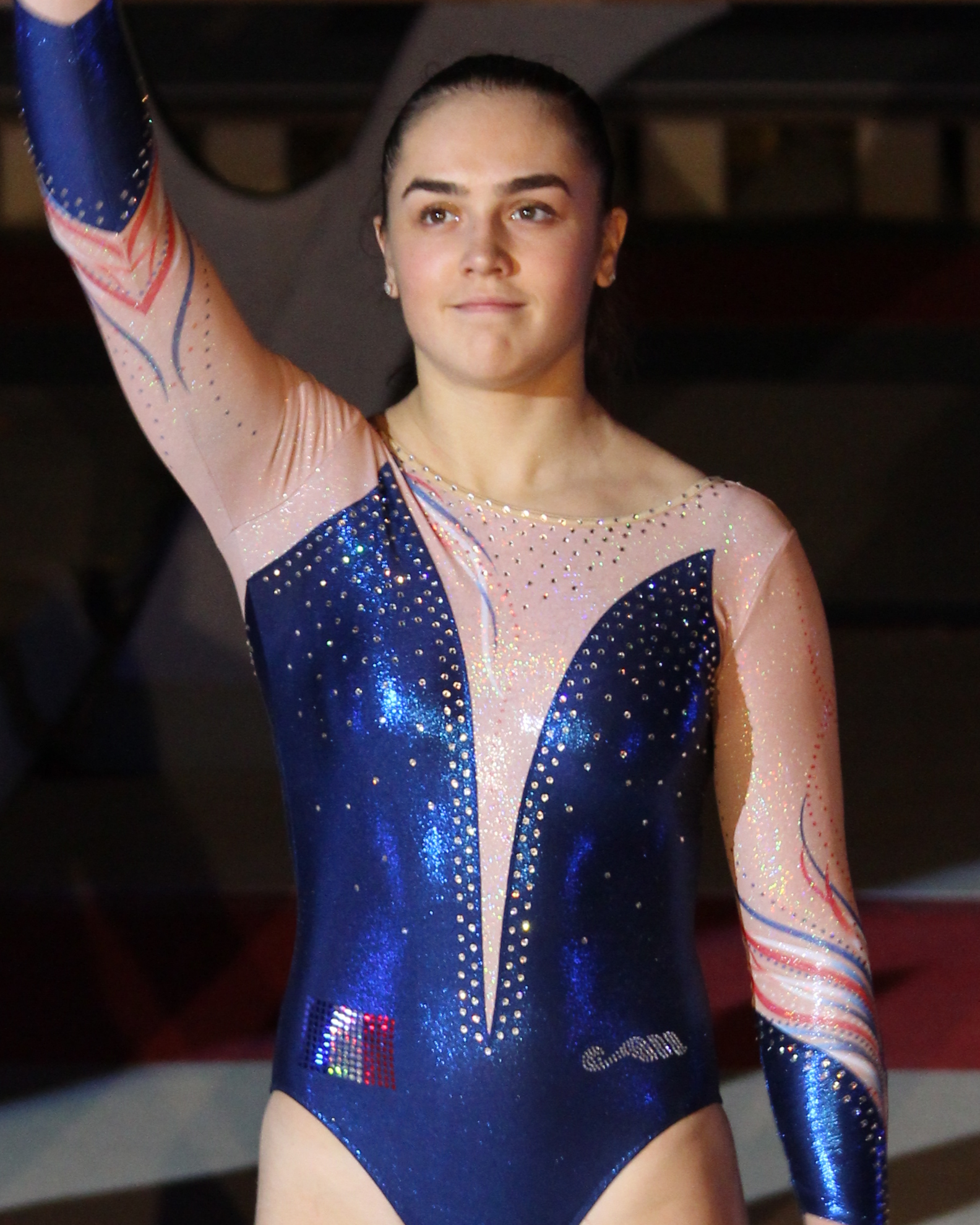
Louise Vanhille

Gymnast	Years	Ref.
Martine Audin	1976	
Nadine Audin	1972, 1976	
Monique Baelden	1964	
Anne-Marie Bauduin	1988	
Rose-Eliandre Bellemare	2008	
Karine Boucher	1988, 1992	
Mira Boumejmajen	2012	
Nicole Bourdiau	1968	
Marine Boyer	2016, 2020, 2024	
Marine Brevet	2016	
Jacqueline Brisepierre	1964, 1968	
Cécile Canqueteau	1996	
Mireille Cayre	1968, 1972	
Coralie Chacon	2004	
Soraya Chaouch	2004	
Karine Charlier	1992	
Marie-Angéline Colson	1992	
Catherine Daugé	1972	
Marine Debauve	2004, 2008	
Mélanie de Jesus dos Santos	2020, 2024	
Anne-Marie Demortière	1960	
Coline Devillard	2024	
Jacqueline Dieudonné	1956, 1960	
Youna Dufournet	2012	
Laetitia Dugain	2008	
Ginette Durand	1952	
Anne-Sophie Endeler	2000	
Colette Fanara	1952	
Aline Friess	2020	
Ludivine Furnon	1996, 2000	
Elvire Gertosio	1972	
Laure Gély	1996	
Carolann Héduit	2020	
Pascale Hermant	1972	
Loan His	2016	
Renée Hugon	1960	
Colette Hué	1948, 1952	
Madeleine Jouffroy	1952	
Anne Kuhm	2012	
Florence Laborderie	1984	
Dominique Lauvard	1968	
Oréane Lechenault	2016	
Émilie Le Pennec	2004	
Paulette le Raer	1960	
Alexandra Lemoine	1952	
Evelyne Letourneur	1964, 1968	
Katheleen Lindor	2008	
Virginie Machado	1992	
Chloé Maigre	1992	
Aurélie Malaussena	2012	
Liliane Montagne	1952	
Pauline Morel	2008	
Françoise Nourry	1968	
Morgane Osyssek	2024	
Marine Petit	2008	
Irène Pittelioen	1948, 1952	
Corinne Ragazzacci	1984	
Nelly Ramassamy	2000	
Delphine Regease	2000	
Jenny Rolland	1992	
Catherine Romano	1988	
Monique Rossi	1960	
Camille Schmutz	2004	
Chantal Seggiaro	1976	
Sophia Serseri	2012	
Isabelle Severino	1996, 2004	
Danièle Sicot-Coulon	1956, 1960	
Alexandra Soler	2000	
Elvire Teza	1996, 2000	
Véronique Tilmont	1972	
Orélie Troscompt	1996	
Ming van Eijken	2024	
Louise Vanhille	2016	
Jeanette Vogelbacher	1948, 1952	
Émilie Volle	1996	

== Medalists ==
Medal	Name	Year	Event
Gold	Émilie Le Pennec	(Greece) 2004 Athens	Women's uneven bars

== See also ==
- Gymnastics at the Summer Olympics
- List of Olympic medalists in gymnastics (women)
