= List of gymnasts at the 1952 Summer Olympics =

This is a list of the gymnasts who represented their country at the 1952 Summer Olympics in Helsinki from 19 July to 3 August 1952. Only one discipline, artistic gymnastics, was included in the Games.

== Female artistic gymnasts ==
	Name	Country	Date of birth (Age)
Youngest competitor	Miranda Cicognani	Italy	12 September 1936 (aged 15)
Oldest competitor	Marie Hoesly	United States	5 November 1916 (aged 35)

NOC	Name	Date of birth (Age)	Hometown
Austria	Gerti Fesl	29 September 1931 (aged 20)	
Austria	Trude Gollner-Kolar	23 January 1926 (aged 26)	Graz, Austria
Austria	Gertrude Gries	16 October 1924 (aged 27)	
Austria	Hildegard Grill	20 October 1927 (aged 24)	
Austria	Ida Kadlec	6 October 1929 (aged 22)	
Austria	Edeltraud Schramm	16 December 1923 (aged 28)	Linz, Austria
Austria	Hedwig Traindl	5 October 1934 (aged 17)	
Austria	Gertrude Winnige-Barosch	19 January 1929 (aged 23)	
Bulgaria	Stoyanka Angelova	28 March 1928 (aged 24)	Burgas, Bulgaria
Bulgaria	Ivanka Dolzheva	10 September 1935 (aged 16)	Sofia, Bulgaria
Bulgaria	Rayna Grigorova	25 July 1931 (aged 20)	Varna, Bulgaria
Bulgaria	Penka Prisadashka	5 March 1929 (aged 23)	
Bulgaria	Saltirka Spasova-Tarpova	22 July 1933 (aged 18)	Gulyantsi, Bulgaria
Bulgaria	Tsvetanka Stancheva	18 August 1929 (aged 22)	
Bulgaria	Vasilka Stancheva	29 November 1929 (aged 22)	
Bulgaria	Yordanka Yovkova	8 January 1933 (aged 19)	
Czechoslovakia	Hana Bobková	19 February 1929 (aged 23)	Prague, Czechoslovakia
Czechoslovakia	Alena Chadimová	22 November 1931 (aged 20)	Olomouc, Czechoslovakia
Czechoslovakia	Jana Rabasová	22 July 1933 (aged 18)	Prague, Czechoslovakia
Czechoslovakia	Alena Reichová	27 July 1933 (aged 18)	Plzeň, Czechoslovakia
Czechoslovakia	Matylda Šínová	29 March 1933 (aged 19)	Brno, Czechoslovakia
Czechoslovakia	Božena Srncová	11 June 1925 (aged 27)	Prague, Czechoslovakia
Czechoslovakia	Věra Vančurová	17 September 1932 (aged 19)	Prague, Czechoslovakia
Czechoslovakia	Eva Věchtová	18 December 1931 (aged 20)	Mladá Boleslav, Czechoslovakia
Finland	Raili Hoviniemi	13 May 1936 (aged 16)	Joensuu, Finland
Finland	Arja Lehtinen	23 April 1936 (aged 16)	Helsinki, Finland
Finland	Maila Nisula	18 March 1931 (aged 21)	Vyborg, Finland
Finland	Pirkko Pyykönen	18 June 1936 (aged 16)	Helsinki, Finland
Finland	Vappu Salonen	12 February 1929 (aged 23)	Tampere, Finland
Finland	Raija Simola	28 April 1932 (aged 20)	Lahti, Finland
Finland	Raili Tuominen-Hämäläinen	13 October 1932 (aged 19)	Tampere, Finland
Finland	Pirkko Vilppunen	19 May 1934 (aged 18)	Vyborg, Finland
France	Ginette Durand	5 April 1929 (aged 23)	Roanne, France
France	Colette Fanara	15 February 1926 (aged 26)	
France	Colette Hué	11 May 1932 (aged 20)	Paris, France
France	Madeleine Jouffroy	20 November 1927 (aged 24)	Chalon-sur-Saône, France
France	Alexandra Lemoine	1 April 1928 (aged 24)	
France	Liliane Montagne	16 March 1931 (aged 21)	
France	Irène Pittelioen	13 May 1927 (aged 25)	Lille, France
France	Jeanette Vogelbacher	2 February 1922 (aged 30)	Belfort, France
Germany	Hanna Grages	8 December 1922 (aged 29)	Verden, Germany
Germany	Brigitte Kiesler	15 August 1924 (aged 27)	Ludwigslust, Germany
Germany	Hilde Koop	26 May 1921 (aged 31)	Bremen, Germany
Germany	Elisabeth Ostermeyer	2 April 1929 (aged 23)	Nuremberg, Germany
Germany	Inge Sedlmaier	4 May 1925 (aged 27)	Landshut, Germany
Germany	Wolfgard Voß	24 June 1926 (aged 26)	Oldenburg, Germany
Germany	Irma Walther	14 September 1920 (aged 31)	Nuremberg, Germany
Germany	Lydia Zeitlhofer	18 February 1931 (aged 21)	Neuötting, Germany
Great Britain	Cissy Davies	1 December 1932 (aged 19)	Swansea, Wales
Great Britain	Irene Hirst	11 July 1930 (aged 22)	North Bierley, England
Great Britain	Pat Hirst	18 November 1918 (aged 33)	Wortley, England
Great Britain	Gwynedd Lewis-Lingard	28 December 1934 (aged 17)	Cardiff, Wales
Great Britain	Margo Morgan	29 December 1929 (aged 22)	
Great Britain	Valerie Mullins	17 January 1935 (aged 17)	Swansea, Wales
Great Britain	Marjorie Raistrick	10 May 1934 (aged 18)	Bradford, England
Great Britain	Margaret Thomas-Neale	22 August 1931 (aged 20)	Cardiff, Wales
Hungary	Andrea Bodó	4 August 1934 (aged 17)	Budapest, Hungary
Hungary	Irén Daruházi-Karcsics	18 March 1927 (aged 25)	Budapest, Hungary
Hungary	Erzsébet Gulyás-Köteles	3 November 1924 (aged 27)	Budapest, Hungary
Hungary	Ágnes Keleti	9 January 1921 (aged 31)	Budapest, Hungary
Hungary	Margit Korondi	24 June 1932 (aged 20)	Celje, Yugoslavia
Hungary	Mária Kövi-Zalai	20 October 1924 (aged 27)	Târgu Mureș, Romania
Hungary	Edit Perényi-Weckinger	5 May 1923 (aged 29)	Kispent, Hungary
Hungary	Olga Tass	29 March 1929 (aged 23)	Pécs, Hungary
Italy	Renata Bianchi	12 July 1926 (aged 26)	Cornigliano, Italy
Italy	Grazia Bozzo	23 January 1936 (aged 16)	Sestri Ponente, Italy
Italy	Miranda Cicognani	12 September 1936 (aged 15)	Forlì, Italy
Italy	Elisabetta Durelli	17 January 1936 (aged 16)	Lodi, Italy
Italy	Licia Macchini	11 July 1930 (aged 22)	Lodi, Italy
Italy	Lidia Pitteri	9 September 1933 (aged 18)	Venice, Italy
Italy	Luciana Reali	4 March 1936 (aged 16)	
Italy	Liliana Scaricabarozzi	5 October 1934 (aged 17)	Lodi, Italy
Netherlands	Jo Cox-Ladru	8 March 1923 (aged 29)	Amsterdam, Netherlands
Netherlands	Lenie Gerrietsen	28 March 1930 (aged 22)	Utrecht, Netherlands
Netherlands	Huiberdina Krul	22 May 1922 (aged 30)	The Hague, Netherlands
Netherlands	Annie Ros	5 March 1926 (aged 26)	Utrecht, Netherlands
Netherlands	Toetie Selbach	11 April 1934 (aged 18)	Amsterdam, Netherlands
Netherlands	Tootje Selbach	14 March 1928 (aged 24)	Amsterdam, Netherlands
Netherlands	Nanny Simon	23 June 1931 (aged 21)	Amsterdam, Netherlands
Netherlands	Cootje van Kampen-Tonneman	15 September 1921 (aged 30)	Horn, Netherlands
Norway	Norveig Karlsen	16 May 1922 (aged 30)	Moss, Norway
Norway	Bergljot Sandvik-Johansen	27 January 1922 (aged 30)	Oslo, Norway
Norway	Grethe Werner	28 May 1928 (aged 24)	Oslo, Norway
Poland	Dorota Horzonek-Jokiel	3 February 1934 (aged 18)	Nowy Bytom, Poland
Poland	Zofia Kowalczyk	30 April 1929 (aged 23)	Kraków, Poland
Poland	Urszula Łukomska	1 December 1926 (aged 25)	Poznań, Poland
Poland	Honorata Marcińczak	17 June 1930 (aged 22)	Kraków, Poland
Poland	Helena Rakoczy	23 December 1921 (aged 30)	Kraków, Poland
Poland	Stefania Reindl	24 February 1922 (aged 30)	Kraków, Poland
Poland	Stefania Świerzy	19 June 1934 (aged 18)	Ruda Śląska, Poland
Poland	Barbara Wilk-Ślizowska	4 February 1935 (aged 17)	Kraków, Poland
Portugal	Maria Laura Amorim	28 April 1932 (aged 20)	
Portugal	Dália da Cunha-Sammer	26 December 1928 (aged 23)	Lisbon, Portugal
Portugal	Natália Silva	15 September 1927 (aged 24)	
Romania	Elisabeta Abrudeanu	28 June 1926 (aged 26)	
Romania	Teofila Băiașu	25 July 1927 (aged 24)	
Romania	Helga Bîrsan	29 June 1928 (aged 24)	
Romania	Olga Göllner	8 November 1930 (aged 21)	Cluj-Napoca, Romania
Romania	Ileana Gyarfaș	8 January 1932 (aged 20)	Cluj-Napoca, Romania
Romania	Olga Munteanu	18 October 1927 (aged 24)	
Romania	Stela Perin	6 May 1934 (aged 18)	Arad, Romania
Romania	Eveline Slavici	7 December 1932 (aged 19)	Bucharest, Romania
Soviet Union	Nina Bocharova	24 September 1924 (aged 27)	Supranivka, Ukrainian SSR
Soviet Union	Pelageya Danilova	4 May 1918 (aged 34)	Boroviki, Russian SFSR
Soviet Union	Maria Gorokhovskaya	17 October 1921 (aged 30)	Yevpatoria, Ukrainian SSR
Soviet Union	Medea Jugeli	1 August 1925 (aged 26)	Kutaisi, Georgian SSR
Soviet Union	Ekaterina Kalinchuk	2 December 1922 (aged 29)	Zhitovo, Russian SFSR
Soviet Union	Galina Minaicheva	29 December 1929 (aged 22)	Moscow, Russian SFSR
Soviet Union	Galina Shamrai	5 October 1931 (aged 20)	Tashkent, Uzbek SSR
Soviet Union	Galina Urbanovich	5 September 1917 (aged 34)	Baku, Azerbaijan SSR
Sweden	Evy Berggren	16 June 1934 (aged 18)	Skellefteå, Sweden
Sweden	Vanja Blomberg	28 January 1929 (aged 23)	Gothenburg, Sweden
Sweden	Karin Lindberg	6 October 1929 (aged 22)	Kalix, Sweden
Sweden	Hjördis Nordin	2 August 1932 (aged 19)	Lund, Sweden
Sweden	Ann-Sofi Pettersson	1 January 1932 (aged 20)	Stockholm, Sweden
Sweden	Göta Pettersson	18 December 1926 (aged 25)	Stockholm, Sweden
Sweden	Gun Röring	16 June 1930 (aged 22)	Umeå, Sweden
Sweden	Ingrid Sandahl	5 November 1924 (aged 27)	Stockholm, Sweden
United States	Marian Barone	18 March 1924 (aged 28)	Philadelphia, Pennsylvania
United States	Dorothy Dalton	1 August 1922 (aged 29)	Newark, New Jersey
United States	Meta Elste	16 October 1919 (aged 32)	Bremen, Germany
United States	Ruth Grulkowski	9 December 1930 (aged 21)	Waumandee, Wisconsin
United States	Marie Hoesly	5 November 1916 (aged 35)	Perry, Wisconsin
United States	Doris Kirkman	15 July 1930 (aged 22)	Elizabeth, New Jersey
United States	Clara Schroth-Lomady	5 October 1920 (aged 31)	Philadelphia, Pennsylvania
United States	Ruth Topalian	9 February 1927 (aged 25)	New York City
Yugoslavia	Anka Drinić	11 March 1924 (aged 28)	
Yugoslavia	Marija Ivandekić	25 August 1925 (aged 26)	
Yugoslavia	Tereza Kočiš	27 April 1934 (aged 18)	Sombor, Yugoslavia
Yugoslavia	Milica Rožman	1932	Ljubljana, Yugoslavia
Yugoslavia	Sonja Rožman	1934	Jesenice, Yugoslavia
Yugoslavia	Ada Smolnikar	1935	Jesenice, Yugoslavia
Yugoslavia	Nada Spasić	7 March 1934 (aged 18)	
Yugoslavia	Tanja Žutić	29 January 1927 (aged 25)	Ptuj, Yugoslavia

== Male artistic gymnasts ==
	Name	Country	Date of birth (Age)
Youngest competitor	Graham Harcourt	United Kingdom	16 April 1934 (aged 18)
Oldest competitor	Heikki Savolainen	Finland	28 September 1907 (aged 44)

NOC	Name	Date of birth (Age)	Hometown
Argentina	César Bonoris	22 September 1927 (aged 24)	
Argentina	Juan Caviglia	28 November 1929 (aged 22)	Córdoba, Argentina
Austria	Friedrich Fetz	2 November 1927 (aged 24)	Schlins, Austria
Austria	Hans Friedrich	9 February 1924 (aged 28)	
Austria	Wolfgang Girardi	19 April 1928 (aged 24)	
Austria	Paul Grubenthal	5 August 1932 (aged 19)	
Austria	Franz Kemter	21 February 1922 (aged 30)	Dornbirn, Austria
Austria	Hans Sauter	6 June 1925 (aged 27)	Bregenz, Austria
Austria	Willi Welt	19 August 1926 (aged 25)	
Austria	Ernst Wister	11 July 1922 (aged 30)	
Belgium	Maurice De Groote	24 September 1908 (aged 43)	
Belgium	Frederik De Waele	16 June 1919 (aged 33)	Zele, Belgium
Belgium	Jeroom Riske	14 August 1919 (aged 32)	Temse, Belgium
Bulgaria	Nikolay Atanasov	20 May 1924 (aged 28)	Botevgrad, Bulgaria
Bulgaria	Vasil Konstantinov	15 April 1929 (aged 23)	Burgas, Bulgaria
Bulgaria	Nikolay Milev	18 November 1930 (aged 21)	
Bulgaria	Stoyan Stoyanov	25 October 1931 (aged 20)	Nikolovo, Bulgaria
Bulgaria	Mincho Todorov	26 December 1931 (aged 20)	Krivnya, Bulgaria
Bulgaria	Todor Todorov	2 November 1928 (aged 23)	
Bulgaria	Iliya Topalov	10 November 1926 (aged 25)	
Bulgaria	Dimitar Yordanov	4 February 1928 (aged 24)	
Cuba	Ángel Aguiar	7 November 1926 (aged 25)	Havana, Cuba
Cuba	Francisco Cascante	28 June 1928 (aged 24)	Havana, Cuba
Cuba	Rafael Lecuona	2 June 1928 (aged 24)	Havana, Cuba
Czechoslovakia	Ferdinand Daniš	7 January 1929 (aged 23)	Lučenec, Czechoslovakia
Czechoslovakia	Vladimír Kejř	20 January 1929 (aged 23)	Úvaly, Czechoslovakia
Czechoslovakia	Miloš Kolejka	18 October 1926 (aged 25)	Němčice nad Hanou, Czechoslovakia
Czechoslovakia	Jindřich Mikulec	11 May 1928 (aged 24)	Rokytnice, Czechoslovakia
Czechoslovakia	Zdeněk Růžička	15 April 1925 (aged 27)	Ivančice, Czechoslovakia
Czechoslovakia	Josef Škvor	8 December 1929 (aged 22)	Dojetřice, Czechoslovakia
Czechoslovakia	Leo Sotorník	11 April 1926 (aged 26)	Vítkovice, Czechoslovakia
Czechoslovakia	Josef Svoboda	9 October 1930 (aged 21)	
Denmark	Freddy Jensen	28 January 1926 (aged 26)	Nuuk, Greenland
Denmark	Poul Jessen	17 February 1926 (aged 26)	Copenhagen, Denmark
Denmark	Bjarne Jørgensen	13 May 1933 (aged 19)	Copenhagen, Denmark
Denmark	Børge Minerth	2 April 1920 (aged 32)	Copenhagen, Denmark
Denmark	Børge Nielsen	19 October 1924 (aged 27)	Viborg, Denmark
Denmark	Gunnar Pedersen	23 September 1924 (aged 27)	Aarhus, Denmark
Denmark	Volmer Thomsen	31 October 1917 (aged 34)	Horsens, Denmark
Egypt	Ahmed Issam Allam	13 September 1931 (aged 20)	Cairo, Egypt
Egypt	Ahmed Khalil El-Giddawi	1931	Cairo, Egypt
Egypt	Ragai Youssef Farhat	1932	Alexandria, Egypt
Egypt	Magdy Gheriani	18 February 1931 (aged 21)	Alexandria, Egypt
Egypt	Mohamed Sayed Hamdi	11 December 1931 (aged 20)	Cairo, Egypt
Egypt	Mahmoud Reda	18 March 1930 (aged 22)	Cairo, Egypt
Egypt	Mahmoud Safwat	16 November 1930 (aged 21)	Cairo, Egypt
Egypt	Ali Zaky	1930	Alexandria, Egypt
Finland	Paavo Aaltonen	12 December 1919 (aged 32)	Kemi, Finland
Finland	Kalevi Laitinen	19 May 1918 (aged 34)	Kotka, Finland
Finland	Onni Lappalainen	30 July 1922 (aged 29)	Mikkeli, Finland
Finland	Kaino Lempinen	8 February 1921 (aged 31)	Lemu, Finland
Finland	Berndt Lindfors	21 October 1932 (aged 19)	Helsinki, Finland
Finland	Olavi Rove	29 July 1915 (aged 36)	Helsinki, Finland
Finland	Heikki Savolainen	28 September 1907 (aged 44)	Joensuu, Finland
Finland	Kalevi Viskari	15 June 1928 (aged 24)	Enso, Finland
France	Raymond Badin	19 March 1928 (aged 24)	Mâcon, France
France	René Changeat	31 December 1930 (aged 21)	Lyon, France
France	Marcel de Wolf	19 September 1919 (aged 32)	Trith-Saint-Léger, France
France	Raymond Dot	20 December 1926 (aged 25)	Puteaux, France
France	Georges Floquet	20 July 1920 (aged 31)	Anor, France
France	Jean Guillou	24 June 1931 (aged 21)	Plouédern, France
France	Michel Mathiot	23 August 1926 (aged 25)	Besançon, France
France	André Weingand	14 March 1915 (aged 37)	Luxeuil-les-Bains, France
Germany	Helmut Bantz	14 September 1921 (aged 30)	Speyer, Germany
Germany	Adalbert Dickhut	16 May 1923 (aged 29)	Dortmund, Germany
Germany	Jakob Kiefer	3 December 1919 (aged 32)	Bad Kreuznach, Germany
Germany	Friedel Overwien	27 September 1922 (aged 29)	
Germany	Hans Pfann	14 September 1920 (aged 31)	Nuremberg, Germany
Germany	Alfred Schwarzmann	23 March 1912 (aged 40)	Fürth, Germany
Germany	Erich Wied	6 February 1923 (aged 29)	Stuttgart, Germany
Germany	Theo Wied	6 February 1923 (aged 29)	Stuttgart, Germany
Great Britain	Ken Buffin	1 November 1923 (aged 28)	Barry, Wales
Great Britain	Graham Harcourt	16 April 1934 (aged 18)	Swansea, Wales
Great Britain	Peter Starling	15 August 1925 (aged 26)	Norwich, England
Great Britain	Frank Turner	5 November 1922 (aged 29)	London, England
Great Britain	George Weedon	3 July 1920 (aged 32)	Richmond, England
Great Britain	Jack Whitford	3 January 1924 (aged 28)	Swansea, Wales
Hungary	József Fekete	27 February 1923 (aged 29)	Kecskemét, Hungary
Hungary	Ferenc Kemény	15 June 1922 (aged 30)	Nyíregyháza, Hungary
Hungary	Károly Kocsis	27 July 1929 (aged 22)	Debrecen, Hungary
Hungary	János Mogyorósi-Klencs	31 March 1922 (aged 30)	Debrecen, Hungary
Hungary	Ferenc Pataki	18 September 1917 (aged 34)	Budapest, Hungary
Hungary	Sándor Réthy	15 November 1923 (aged 28)	Debrecen, Hungary
Hungary	Lajos Sántha	13 July 1915 (aged 37)	Csorvás, Hungary
Hungary	Lajos Tóth	25 August 1914 (aged 37)	Debrecen, Hungary
India	Khushi Ram	15 January 1916 (aged 36)	Gurdaspur, India
India	Vir Singh	8 July 1930 (aged 22)	Gurdaspur, India
Italy	Fabio Bonacina	26 July 1923 (aged 28)	Lecco, Italy
Italy	Silvio Brivio	6 November 1929 (aged 22)	Como, Italy
Italy	Arrigo Carnoli	31 January 1932 (aged 20)	Ravenna, Italy
Italy	Guido Figone	13 October 1927 (aged 24)	Chiavari, Italy
Italy	Orlando Polmonari	11 March 1924 (aged 28)	Ferrara, Italy
Italy	Littorio Sampieri	16 July 1927 (aged 25)	Forlì, Italy
Italy	Quinto Vadi	13 September 1921 (aged 30)	Faenza, Italy
Italy	Luigi Zanetti	20 September 1921 (aged 30)	Padua, Italy
Japan	Akitomo Kaneko	1 August 1927 (aged 24)	Fukushima Prefecture, Japan
Japan	Tetsumi Nabeya	2 January 1930 (aged 22)	
Japan	Takashi Ono	26 July 1931 (aged 20)	Noshiro, Japan
Japan	Masao Takemoto	29 September 1919 (aged 32)	Hamada, Japan
Japan	Tadao Uesako	14 October 1921 (aged 30)	Hamada, Japan
Luxembourg	Marcel Coppin	27 April 1928 (aged 24)	Paris, France
Luxembourg	Hubert Erang	4 March 1931 (aged 21)	Esch-sur-Alzette, Luxembourg
Luxembourg	Armand Huberty	16 August 1930 (aged 21)	Esch-sur-Alzette, Luxembourg
Luxembourg	Jey Kugeler	18 April 1910 (aged 42)	Schifflange, Luxembourg
Luxembourg	René Schroeder	23 December 1920 (aged 31)	Esch-sur-Alzette, Luxembourg
Luxembourg	Josy Stoffel	27 June 1928 (aged 24)	Differdange, Luxembourg
Norway	Mathias Jamtvedt	14 August 1922 (aged 29)	Gjerpen, Norway
Norway	Georg Johansen	3 May 1924 (aged 28)	Tune, Norway
Norway	Magne Kleiven	27 July 1921 (aged 30)	Lillehammer, Norway
Norway	Arne Knudsen	24 May 1923 (aged 29)	Drammen, Norway
Norway	Odd Lie	14 December 1926 (aged 25)	Drammen, Norway
Norway	Ernst Madland	21 February 1927 (aged 25)	Stavanger, Norway
Norway	Alf Nørgaard	30 October 1916 (aged 35)	Sauda, Norway
Norway	Alf Olsen	4 November 1925 (aged 26)	Stavanger, Norway
Poland	Paweł Gaca	5 October 1917 (aged 34)	Radlin, Poland
Poland	Paweł Gawron	23 March 1921 (aged 31)	Rydułtowy, Poland
Poland	Jerzy Jokiel	9 August 1931 (aged 20)	Ruda Śląska, Poland
Poland	Ryszard Kucjas	4 December 1922 (aged 29)	Rybnik, Poland
Poland	Zdzisław Lesiński	19 September 1921 (aged 30)	Poznań, Poland
Poland	Szymon Sobala	15 January 1919 (aged 33)	Piekary Śląskie, Poland
Poland	Jerzy Solarz	12 February 1930 (aged 22)	Kraków, Poland
Poland	Paweł Świętek	28 October 1924 (aged 27)	Piekary Śląskie, Poland
Portugal	Raúl Caldeira	21 January 1927 (aged 25)	
Portugal	Manuel Cardoso	17 June 1928 (aged 24)	Porto, Portugal
Portugal	Manuel Gouveia	2 June 1923 (aged 29)	Lisbon, Portugal
Portugal	Joaquim Granger	31 May 1928 (aged 24)	
Portugal	António Leite	2 April 1924 (aged 28)	
Portugal	Manuel Prazeres	1 December 1927 (aged 24)	
Romania	Eugen Balint	5 March 1927 (aged 25)	
Romania	Zoltan Balogh	3 August 1930 (aged 21)	Chișineu-Criș, Romania
Romania	Carol Bedö	13 December 1930 (aged 21)	Aiud, Romania
Romania	Mihai Botez	31 January 1922 (aged 30)	Oradea, Romania
Romania	Francisc Cociș	19 May 1930 (aged 22)	Giungi, Romania
Romania	Andrei Kerekeș	4 January 1925 (aged 27)	Reșița, Romania
Romania	Aurel Loșniță	2 November 1927 (aged 24)	
Romania	Frederic Orendi	12 March 1930 (aged 22)	Mediaș, Romania
Saar	Norbert Dietrich	24 January 1931 (aged 21)	Bildstock, Germany
Saar	Rolf Lauer	11 September 1931 (aged 20)	Bildstock, Germany
Saar	Walter Müller	31 December 1930 (aged 21)	Neunkirchen, Germany
Saar	Heinz Ostheimer	15 September 1931 (aged 20)	Bexbach, Germany
Saar	Arthur Schmitt	27 November 1910 (aged 41)	Dudweiler, Germany
Saar	Fred Wiedersporn	19 October 1931 (aged 20)	Schwalbach, Germany
South Africa	Ronnie Lombard	28 July 1928 (aged 23)	Namibia
South Africa	Jack Wells	3 October 1926 (aged 25)	Bloemfontein, South Africa
South Africa	Rolf Yelseth	25 February 1914 (aged 38)	Durban, South Africa
Soviet Union	Vladimir Belyakov	2 January 1918 (aged 34)	Dmitrov, Russian SFSR
Soviet Union	Iosif Berdiev	26 November 1924 (aged 27)	Ashgabat, Turkmen SSR
Soviet Union	Viktor Chukarin	9 November 1921 (aged 30)	Krasnoarmeyskoye, Ukrainian SSR
Soviet Union	Yevgeny Korolkov	9 October 1930 (aged 21)	Moscow, Russian SFSR
Soviet Union	Dmytro Leonkin	16 December 1928 (aged 23)	Ryazan, Russian SFSR
Soviet Union	Valentin Muratov	30 July 1928 (aged 23)	Kostyukovo, Russian SFSR
Soviet Union	Mikhail Perlman	21 March 1923 (aged 29)	Moscow, Russian SFSR
Soviet Union	Hrant Shahinyan	30 July 1923 (aged 28)	Gyulagarak, Armenian SSR
Spain	Joaquín Blume	21 June 1933 (aged 19)	Barcelona, Spain
Sweden	Arne Carlsson	13 July 1924 (aged 28)	Örebro, Sweden
Sweden	Anders Lindh	2 October 1929 (aged 22)	Örebro, Sweden
Sweden	Erich Peters	11 March 1920 (aged 32)	Kreuzlingen, Switzerland
Sweden	Nils Sjöberg	12 May 1925 (aged 27)	Falun, Sweden
Sweden	Börje Stattin	13 February 1930 (aged 22)	Gävle, Sweden
Sweden	William Thoresson	31 May 1932 (aged 20)	Gothenburg, Sweden
Sweden	Kurt Wigartz	21 March 1933 (aged 19)	Mariestad, Sweden
Switzerland	Hans Eugster	27 February 1929 (aged 23)	Heiden, Switzerland
Switzerland	Ernst Fivian	12 August 1931 (aged 20)	Thun, Switzerland
Switzerland	Ernst Gebendinger	10 February 1926 (aged 26)	Winterthur, Switzerland
Switzerland	Jack Günthard	8 January 1920 (aged 32)	Hirzel, Switzerland
Switzerland	Hans Schwarzentruber	25 March 1929 (aged 23)	Lucerne, Switzerland
Switzerland	Josef Stalder	6 February 1919 (aged 33)	
Switzerland	Melchior Thalmann	21 May 1924 (aged 28)	
Switzerland	Jean Tschabold	25 December 1925 (aged 26)	
United States	Jack Beckner	9 June 1930 (aged 22)	Los Angeles, California
United States	Walter Blattmann	23 June 1920 (aged 32)	New Orleans, Louisiana
United States	Vincent D'Autorio	1 October 1915 (aged 36)	Newark, New Jersey
United States	Don Holder	29 September 1928 (aged 23)	Jersey City, New Jersey
United States	Bill Roetzheim	7 August 1928 (aged 23)	Chicago, Illinois
United States	Ed Scrobe	26 January 1923 (aged 29)	New York City
United States	Charles Simms	24 January 1928 (aged 24)	New York City
United States	Bob Stout	9 November 1925 (aged 26)	Philadelphia, Pennsylvania
Yugoslavia	Ivan Čaklec	5 August 1932 (aged 19)	Varaždin, Yugoslavia
Yugoslavia	Dušan Furlan	24 August 1929 (aged 22)	Brezovica pri Ljubljani, Yugoslavia
Yugoslavia	Karel Janež	22 January 1914 (aged 38)	Ljubljana, Yugoslavia
Yugoslavia	Ivica Jelić	28 September 1917 (aged 34)	
Yugoslavia	Franjo Jurjević	22 November 1932 (aged 19)	Bjelovar, Yugoslavia
Yugoslavia	Antun Kropivšek	17 May 1925 (aged 27)	Šentjur, Yugoslavia
Yugoslavia	Ede Mađar	28 July 1931 (aged 20)	Subotica, Yugoslavia
Yugoslavia	Sreten Stefanović	17 November 1916 (aged 35)	Sarajevo, Yugoslavia
