= Isaac ben Judah HaLevi =

13th-century French rabbi

Rabbi Isaac ben Judah HaLevi
- יצחק בן יהודה הלוי

Personal life
- Parent: Judah HaLevi (father)

Religious life
- Religion: Judaism

Jewish leader
- Residence: Sens

Isaac ben Judah HaLevi (Hebrew: יצחק בן יהודה הלוי) was a French exegete and tosafist; lived at Sens, probably, in the second half of the thirteenth century.

He was the pupil of Haim of Falaise, whom Heinrich Gross identifies with Chaim Paltiel.

== Works ==
Isaac compiled, under the title "Pa'aneaḥ Raza" (Hebrew: פענח רזא), a commentary on the Pentateuch, in which literal interpretations ("peshaṭ") are frequently intermingled with "Noṭariḳon" and "Gemaṭriot." The authorities quoted by Isaac are Joseph Ḳara, Joseph Bekor Shor, Judah he-Ḥasid, Eleazar of Worms, Haim of Falaise, and many other tosafists. The "Pa'aneaḥ Raza" was first published at Prague in 1607, from an incomplete manuscript, by Isaac Cohen, the son-in-law of Jacob Mölin. Complete copies of the work, with a postscript, and a poem containing the name of the compiler in acrostic, are extant in manuscript in the Bodleian and other European libraries.

Isaac wrote Tosafot to the Talmud, and is called "Ba'al Tosafot mi-Shanẓ" (="The Tosafist of Sens").
