= Paltrow =

Origin
- Languages: Slavic, Anglicized
- Meaning: Anglicized from Paltrowicz, Paltrowitch; derived from Palter, Yiddish given name from Paltiel
- Region of origin: Poland

Other names
- Variant forms: Paltiel (Hebrew: פלטיאל), Palter, Pelter; Paltrowicz, Paltrowitch, Paltrowitz (e.g. Darren Paltrowitz), Palterovich, Polterowicz; Peltowicz, Peltynowicz, etc.
- See also Peter Taylor, Baron Taylor of Gosforth (about rabbinical Palterovich family),

Paltrow is a surname. Notable people with the surname include:

- Bruce Weigert Paltrow (1943–2002) American film director and producer
- Gwyneth Paltrow (born 1972) American actress
- Jake Paltrow (born 1975) American film director
- Rebekah Neumann (nee Paltrow; born 1978), American businesswoman
