= Youna Dufournet =

French gymnast (born 1993)

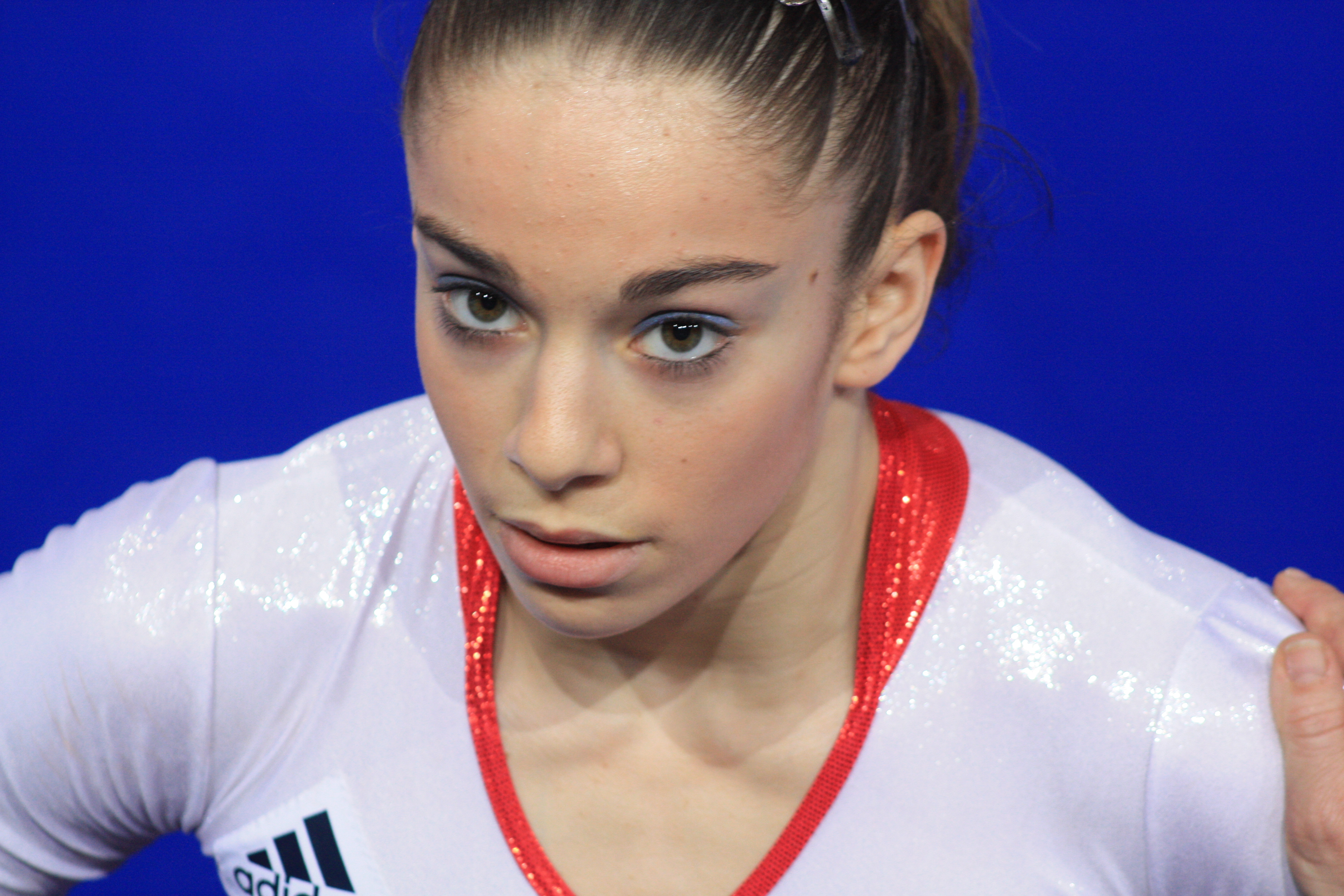

Personal information
- Born: October 19, 1993 (age 32) Saumur, France

Gymnastics career
- Discipline: Women's artistic gymnastics
- Country represented: France
Medal record
Representing France
World Championships
Bronze medal – third place	2009 London	Vault
European Championships
Silver medal – second place	2010 Birmingham	Vault
Mediterranean Games
Gold medal – first place	2009 Pescara	Team
Gold medal – first place	2009 Pescara	All-around
Gold medal – first place	2009 Pescara	Vault
Gold medal – first place	2009 Pescara	Uneven bars
Silver medal – second place	2009 Pescara	Balance beam

Youna Dufournet (born October 19, 1993) is a retired French gymnast, the 2009 World Vault bronze medalist, 2009 all-around champion of the Mediterranean Games, and a 2012 Olympian. She was born in Saumur.

In addition to her vaulting medal, Dufournet finished fifth in the all-around competition at the World Championships, the highest placement ever for a female French gymnast. She is France's second female medalist on vault after Alexandra Lemoine in 1950. Dufournet is the sixth female gymnast from France to obtain an individual medal in World or Olympic competition, following Lemoine in 1950, 1995 World floor bronze medalist Ludivine Furnon, 1996 World bars bronze medalist Isabelle Severino, 2004 Olympic bars champion Émilie Le Pennec and 2007 World Floor bronze medalist Cassy Vericel; at the 1950 World Artistic Gymnastics Championships the French team also got a silver medal.

After severely injuring her knee at the 2010 French National Championships, tension began to develop between Dufournet and her coaches. Dufournet felt she was being pushed too hard during her recovery period, and decided to change gyms in the run-up to the Olympic games. In 2011, she qualified in second place for the uneven bars final, where ultimately she ended up in eight.

Dufournet arrived at the 2012 Olympic Games as a favorite to make the uneven bars final, but during her qualifying routine a grip slipped and she fell from the apparatus. Despite that the slip was due to no fault of her gymnastics, the fall was deducted and she placed 17th on bars, well below the 8th place needed to advance. Dufournet vowed to continue on in hopes of making the 2016 Rio Olympics.

At the 2016 French Championships in June, Dufournet competed on all events except floor, but fell off the uneven bars during prelims and again during the balance beam event final, placing 7th. She ranked 19th in the all-around final. Hampered by injury and knowing she was unlikely to be selected for the French Olympic team, she announced her retirement at age 22 on her Facebook on June 19, 2016, saying she had "given 200% of [her] body and soul to gymnastics throughout the years" and "had no regrets".
