= Paltiel =

Paltiel may refer to one of the following:

- Palti, son of Laish
- Chaim Paltiel (Paltiel of Falaise)
- Julius Paltiel
