= Amand Solbach =

French gymnast (1904–1967)

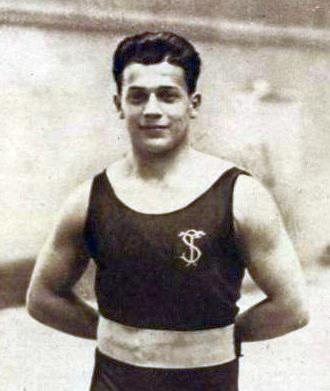
- Solbach in 1927

Personal information
- Alternative name: Armand Solbach
- Born: 10 May 1904 Neuilly-sur-Seine, France
- Died: 17 December 1967 (aged 63) Châteaudun, France
- Spouse: Jeanette Vogelbacher

Gymnastics career
- Discipline: Men's artistic gymnastics
- Country represented: France
- Club: Touristes de Suresnes
Medal record
Men's artistic gymnastics
Representing France
World Championships
Silver medal – second place	1930 Luxembourg	Team
Bronze medal – third place	1926 Lyon	Team

Amand Solbach (10 May 1904 – 17 December 1967) was a French gymnast. He competed at the 1928 Summer Olympics and the 1936 Summer Olympics. He was married to two-time Olympian Jeanette Vogelbacher (1922–2018), who competed in 1948 and 1952. A gymnasium is named in his honour in Châteaudun, where he died in 1967.
