= Falaise =

Falaise may refer to:

== Places ==
- Falaise, Ardennes, commune in France
- Falaise, Calvados, commune in France
  - The Falaise pocket, site of a battle in the Second World War
- La Falaise, commune in the Yvelines département, France
- The Falaise escarpment in Quebec City, Canada
- Falaise, home of Harry Guggenheim at Sands Point, New York
- Falaise de Bandiagara, French name of the Bandiagara Escarpment in Mali

== Other ==
- Treaty of Falaise, December 1174 between the captive William I, King of Scots, and the English King Henry II
