= Toetie Selbach =

Dutch gymnast

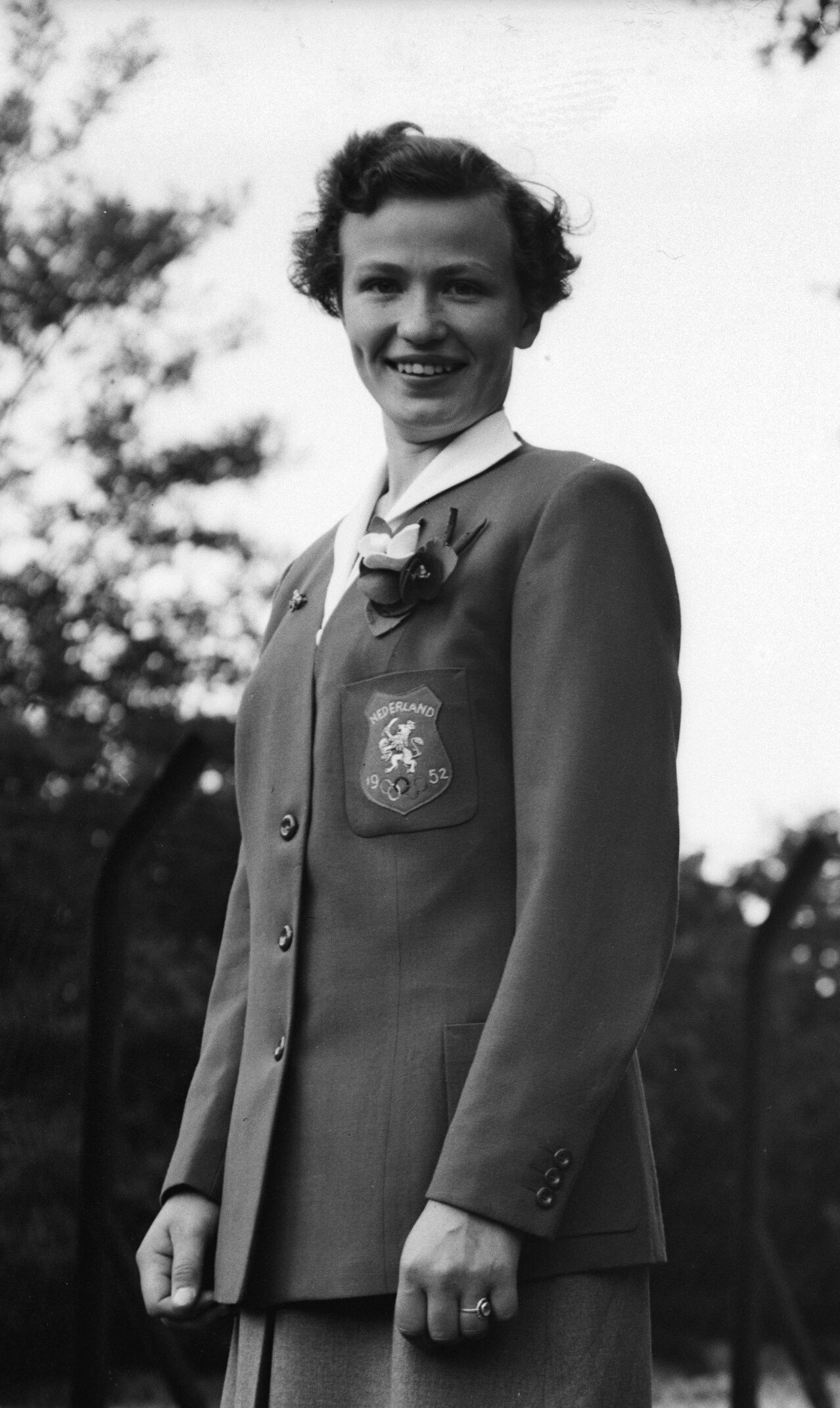
- Toetie Selbach (1952)

Personal information
- Nationality: Dutch
- Born: 11 April 1934 (age 90); Amsterdam, Netherlands

Sport
- Sport: Gymnastics

Toetie Selbach (born 11 April 1934) is a Dutch gymnast. She competed in seven events at the 1952 Summer Olympics. Her older sister Tootje Selbach also competed at the 1952 Summer Olympics in Helsinki.
