= Tootje Selbach =

Dutch gymnast

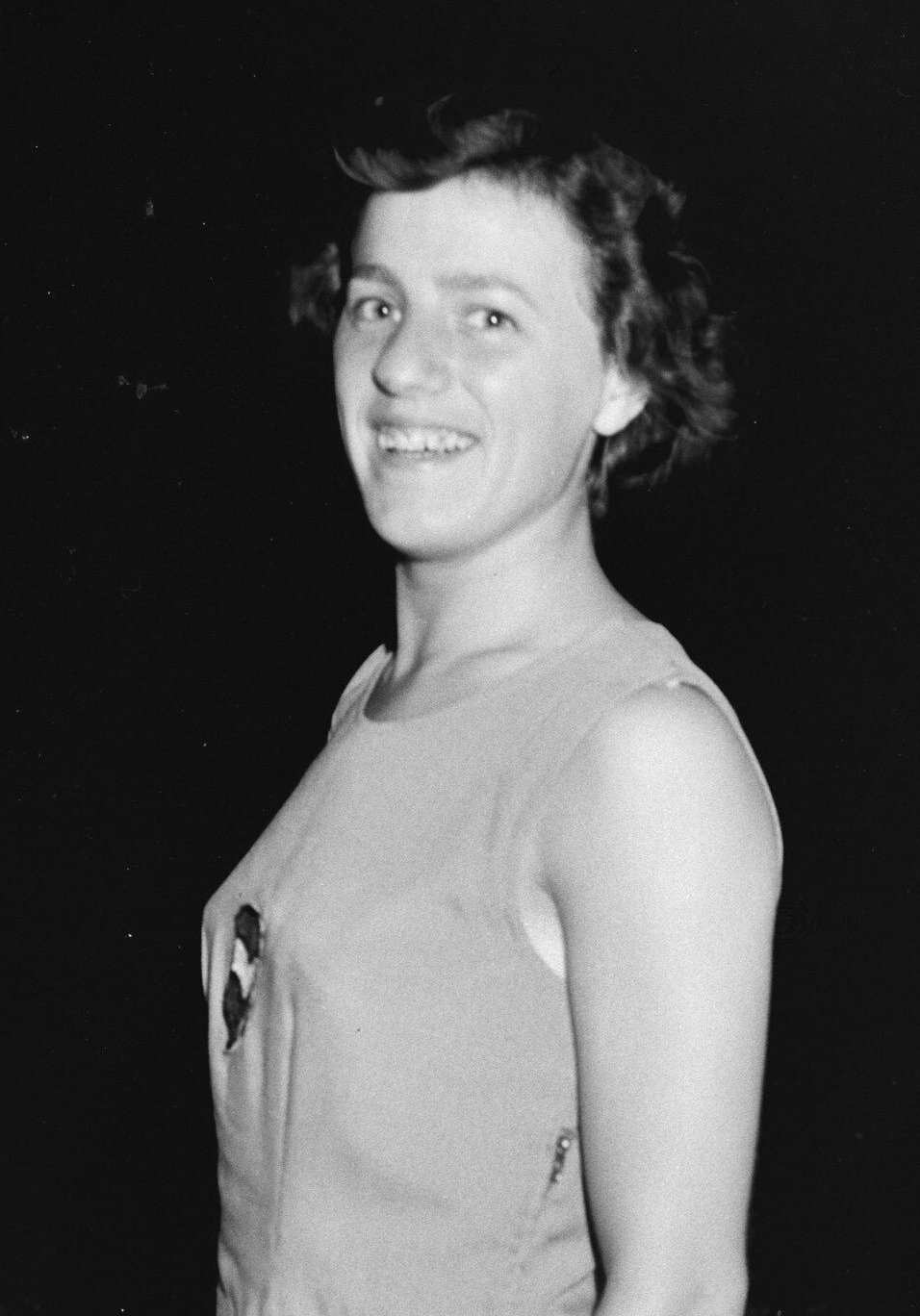
- Tootje Selbach (1952)

Personal information
- Full name: Catharina Selbach
- Nationality: Dutch
- Born: 14 March 1928; Amsterdam, Netherlands

Sport
- Sport: Gymnastics

Tootje Selbach (born 14 March 1928) is a Dutch retired gymnast. She competed in seven events at the 1952 Summer Olympics. Her younger sister Toetie Selbach also competed at the 1952 Summer Olympics.
