= Émilie Le Pennec =

French artistic gymnast

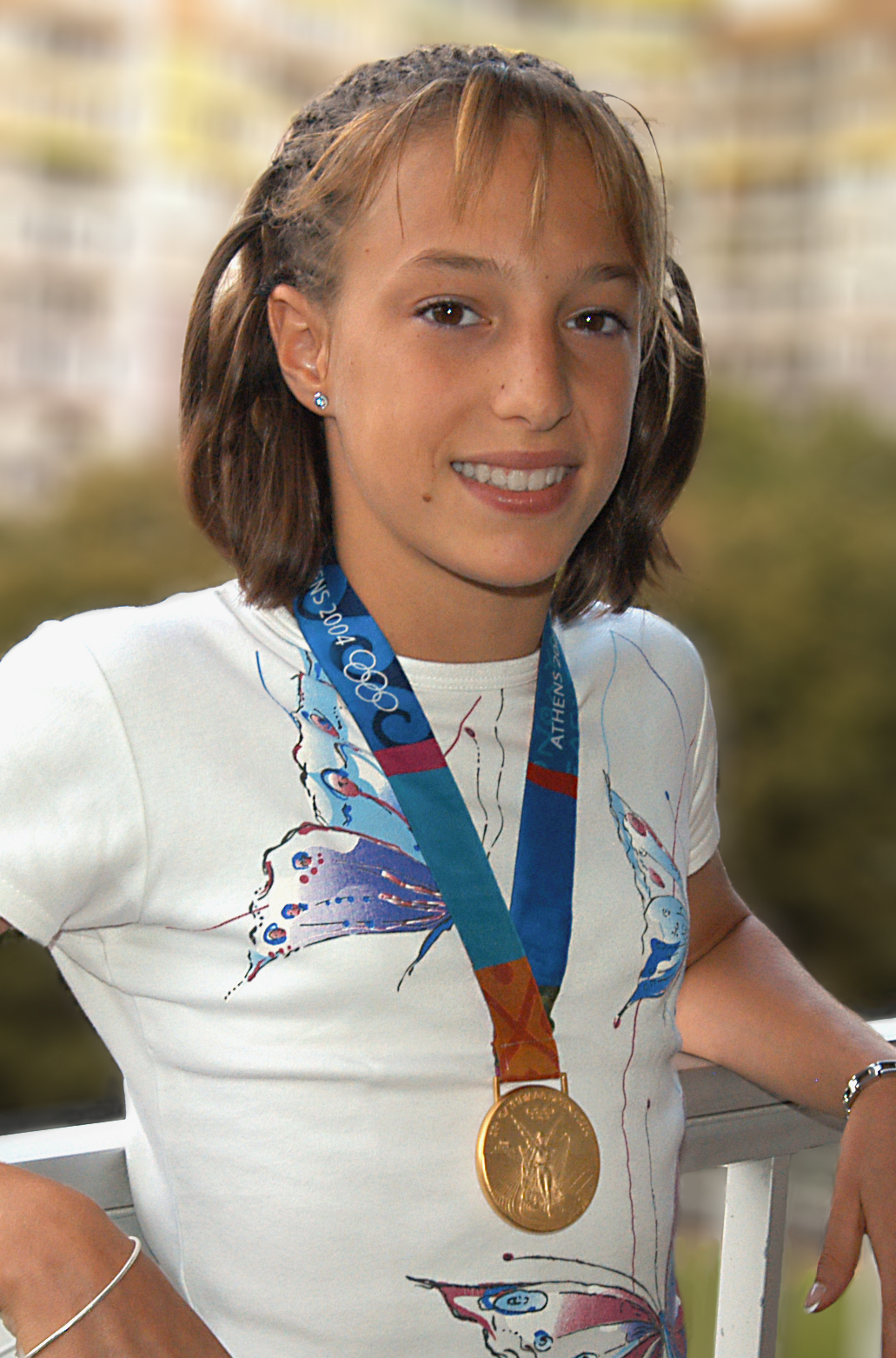
- Le Pennec in 2005

Personal information
- Born: 31 December 1987 (age 38) Paris
- Height: 4 ft 11 in (150 cm)

Gymnastics career
- Discipline: Women's artistic gymnastics
- Country represented: France
- Head coaches: Yves Kieffer & Marjorie Hoels
- Retired: 2007
Medal record
Women's gymnastics
Representing France
Olympic Games
Gold medal – first place	2004 Athens	Uneven bars
European Championships
Gold medal – first place	2005 Debrecen	Uneven bars
Bronze medal – third place	2005 Debrecen	Floor exercise
Mediterranean Games
Silver medal – second place	2005 Almería	Team
Silver medal – second place	2005 Almería	Floor exercise
Bronze medal – third place	2005 Almería	Balance beam

Émilie Le Pennec (born 31 December 1987) is a French retired artistic gymnast. Le Pennec was the 2004 Olympic Champion on the uneven bars and was the first, and to date the only, female French gymnast to win an Olympic medal in women's artistic gymnastics.

== Career ==
Le Pennec was born in La Garenne-Colombes, Hauts-de-Seine. Coached by Yves Kieffer at Pôle France INSEP in Paris, she was the French junior national champion in 2002. At her first senior nationals in 2003, she came fifth, but won a silver medal in her specialty, the uneven bars. She represented France at the 2002 Junior European Championships, where she won a bronze medal in the team event. At the 2003 World Gymnastics Championships, Le Pennec was a member of the 10th-place French team. She also qualified for the all-around and the floor exercise finals, where she finished 11th and seventh, respectively.

At the 2004 Olympics in Athens, Le Pennec placed sixth with the French team and 14th in the all-around final. However, she shone in the uneven bars event final, where her challenging routine helped her win a gold medal over a tough field with numerous Olympic and world champions, including Svetlana Khorkina (who took an infamous fall from the apparatus, which she traditionally dominated) and 2002 World Champion Courtney Kupets. Her medal marked the first ever (and to date the only) for a French female gymnast. She became the third (and to date the last) French Olympic Champion in gymnastics, after Gustave Sandras in 1900 and Albert Séguin in 1924.

Le Pennec continued to train and compete after the Olympics. In 2005, she earned two medals at the European Championships: gold on uneven bars and bronze on floor. She also qualified to the all-around finals in first place, but lost any chance for a medal when she fell during her balance beam routine. Le Pennec also competed in the 2005 World Championships in Melbourne, but mistakes prevented her from medalling.

One of Le Pennec's competitive uneven bars routine was considered to be one of the most technically difficult in the world. In it, she completed a Def (a Gienger release move with a full twist), an element classified at the top difficulty level, Super-E, in the 2005 Code of Points. Le Pennec also performed a double-twisting double back tuck salto dismount.

Le Pennec missed the 2006 European Championships to concentrate on schoolwork. Later, recuperating from an Achilles' tendon injury and acting on the advice of her doctors, she sat out of the 2006 World Championships.

On 27 September 2007, she announced via a press release that she had put an end to her career, mainly after failing to retrieve her level after her multiple injuries in 2006–2007, the latest being a heel injury contracted during the Vittel international match in August 2007.

Olympic Bars Routine: Jump to the low bar immediately to the high bar; hop with full turn; Def (Gienger with 1.5 turn); full pirouette into overshoot to handstand down to the low bar into toe shoot to high bar; double-twisting double back tuck somersault. (S.V: 10.0)

== Later life ==
During the 2008 Summer Olympics, she worked as a consultant for the French TV Canal+.

After she retired from gymnastics, Le Pennec studied to become a physical therapist. She practices in Paris.

Le Pennec participated in the Olympic torch relay at the 2024 Summer Olympics opening ceremony.

== See also ==
- List of Olympic female gymnasts for France
