= Chaim Paltiel =

13th century French Biblical commentator

Chaim Paltiel (known as Paltiel of Falaise) was a French Biblical commentator of the thirteenth century and grandson of the tosafist Samuel of Falaise (Sir Morel). An anonymous commentator on the Pentateuch (Munich MS. No. 62) frequently quotes another commentary (pshatim) on the Pentateuch, the author of which he on one occasion calls "my teacher, Ḥayyim of Falaise"; in other places he speaks of "Ḥayyim," but more often of "Ḥayyim Paltiel." Many passages from Ḥayyim's commentary are given by Isaac b. Judah ha-Levi in his "Pa'aneaḥ Raza" (Munich MS. No. 50). The commentary is called there "Peri 'Eẓ, Ḥayyim," and the author is called "Ḥayyim Paltiel" or, more often, "Paltiel Gaon"; he is also mentioned as teacher of Isaac b. Judah.

== Disambiguation ==
Contrary to Ziemlich's supposition, Gross concluded that Ḥayyim of Falaise must not be identified with Ḥayyim Paltiel b. Jacob, rabbi of Magdeburg, who corresponded with Meir of Rothenburg and who is quoted by Solomon b. Adret. On the other hand, Zunz mentions ten liturgical pieces composed by "Ḥayyim b. Baruch, called Ḥayyim Paltiel," who may be the same as Ḥayyim of Falaise. Zunz says (l.c.) that he is probably the Ḥayyim Paltiel of Magdeburg, forgetting that the latter's father was called Jacob and not Baruch.

== Commentary style ==
Ḥayyim's commentary is aggadic in character, and shows the author to have possessed a thorough knowledge of the Talmud. Ḥayyim was decidedly a great Ashkenazi Rishon and typically presents finely woven elucidations of the words and verses against backdrop of midrashic thought, though at times venturing into the area of remez—the hidden messages which offer further insight into broader applications of Torah passages.
