= Chelles =

Chelles may refer to:

- Chelles, Oise, a commune in the Oise département, France
- Chelles, Seine-et-Marne, a commune in the Seine-et-Marne département, 18 km east of Paris
  - Chelles Abbey, located in the commune until its destruction in 1796
  - Chelles Battle Pro, an annual b-boying competition held in Chelles, Seine-et-Marne
- Jean de Chelles (fl. 1258–1265), master mason and sculptor
- Pierre de Chelles, 14th-century French architect and sculptor
