= Véronique Tilmont =

French gymnast

Personal information
- Nationality: French
- Born: 16 May 1955 (age 69)

Sport
- Sport: Gymnastics

Véronique Tilmont (born 16 May 1955) is a French gymnast. She competed at the 1972 Summer Olympics.
