= Evelyne Letourneur =

French artistic gymnast (born 1947)

Evelyne Letourneur (born 13 September 1947) is a French former artistic gymnast. She competed at the 1964 and 1968 Summer Olympics.
