= Karine Boucher =

French artistic gymnast

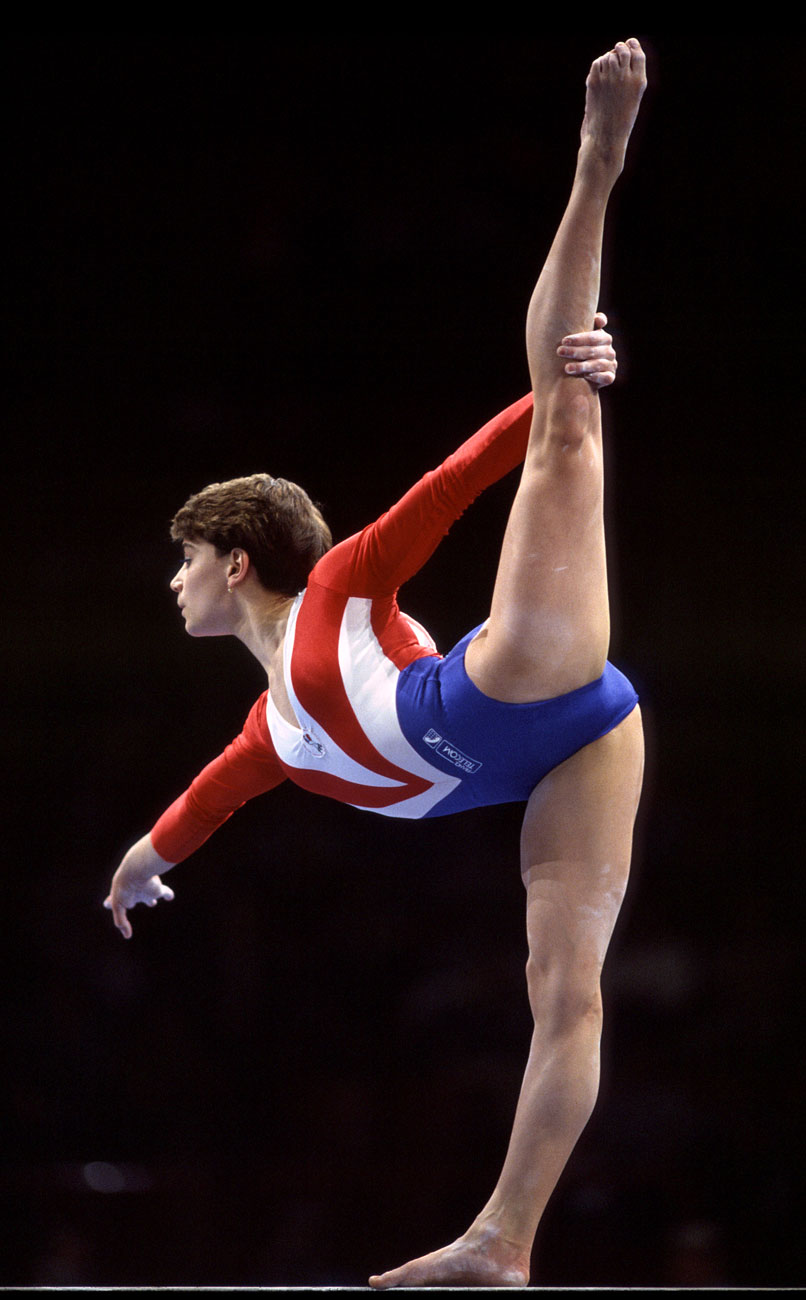

Personal information
- Nationality: French
- Born: 28 July 1972 (age 52); Orléans, France

Sport
- Sport: Artistic gymnastics

Karine Boucher (born 28 July 1972) is a French artistic gymnast, born in Orléans. She competed at the 1988 Summer Olympics, and the 1992 Summer Olympics.

== Competition History ==
Year	Event	Team	AA	VT	UB	BB	FX
1985	Junior Avignon International		5				
1986	Antibes International		4				
1986	Belgian Gym Masters		13				
1986	French National Championships		1st place, gold medalist(s)				
1986	Junior European Championships		10	6			8
1986	Junior FRA-ROM Dual Meet	2nd place, silver medalist(s)	6				
1986	Rome Grand Prix		4				
1987	Belgian Gym Masters		10				
1987	Chunichi Cup		17				
1987	European Championships		12				
1987	French National Championships		1st place, gold medalist(s)				
1987	Tokyo Cup					5	8
1987	World Championships	13	26				
1988	American Cup		6				
1988	French National Championships		1st place, gold medalist(s)				
1988	International Mixed Pairs	11					
1988	Moscow News		10				2nd place, silver medalist(s)
1988	Olympic Games		25				
1989	DTB Cup		8				5
1989	European Championships		10				
1989	Gander Memorial		5				
1989	Moscow News		11		8		
1990
1990	European Championships		12				
1990	French International		7				
1990	Golden Sands International		9				
1990	Moscow News		29				
1991	American Cup		4				
1991	International Mixed Pairs		14				
1991	Mediterranean Games		4				
1991	World Championships	11	20				
1992	FRA-HUN Dual Meet		5				
1992	Olympic Games	8					
