= Anne-Marie Demortière =

French gymnast (1938–2022)

Personal information
- Nationality: French
- Born: 27 January 1938 Le Creusot, France
- Died: 26 April 2022 (aged 84) La Seyne-sur-Mer, France

Sport
- Sport: Gymnastics

Anne-Marie Demortière (27 January 1938 – 26 April 2022) was a French gymnast. She competed in six events at the 1960 Summer Olympics.

Demortière died on 26 April 2022, at the age of 84.
