= Pascale Hermant =

French gymnast

Personal information
- Nationality: French
- Born: 11 May 1957 (age 67)

Sport
- Sport: Gymnastics

Pascale Hermant (born 11 May 1957) is a French gymnast. She competed at the 1972 Summer Olympics.
