= Jenny Rolland =

French gymnast

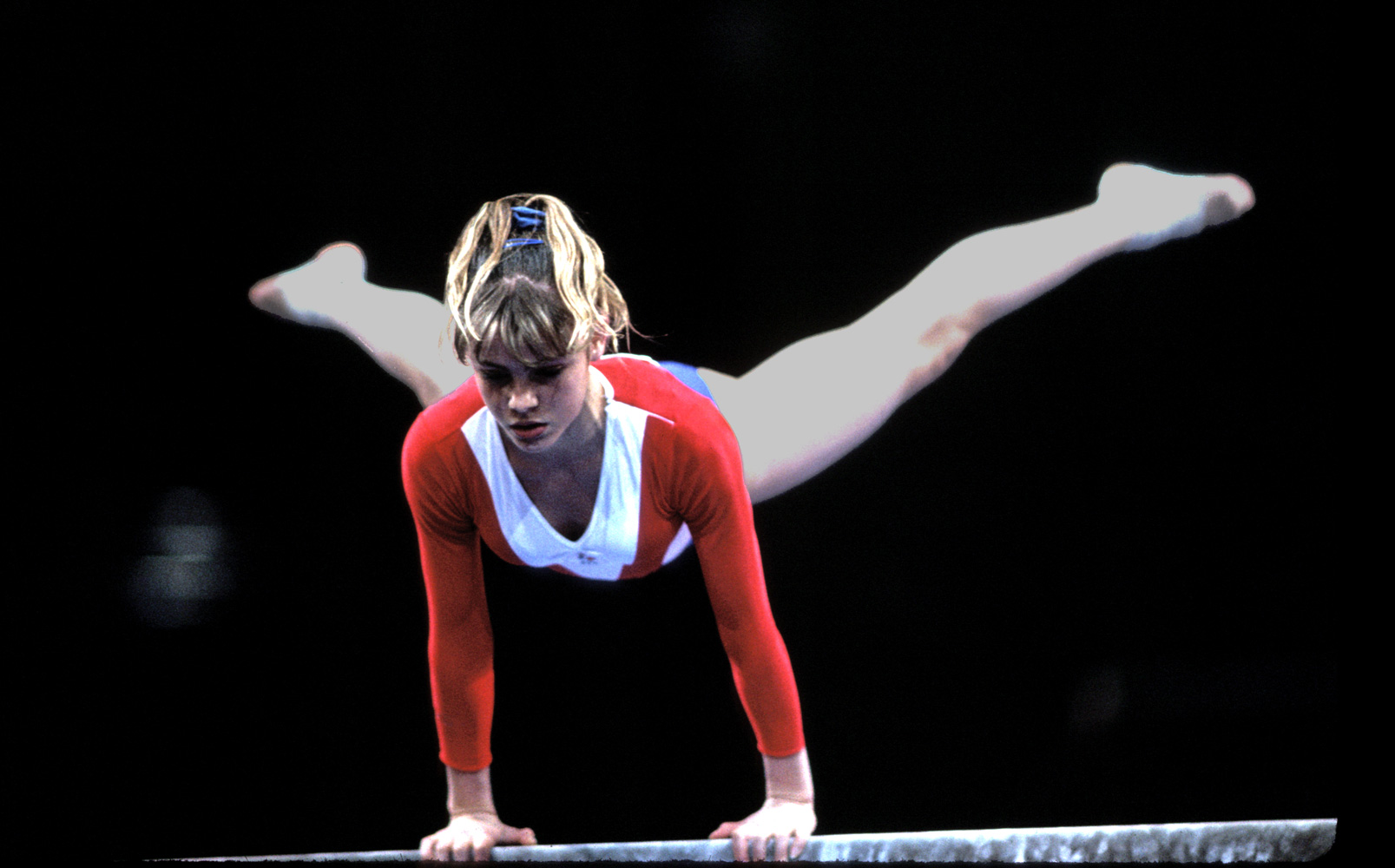

Personal information
- Nationality: French
- Born: 7 January 1975 (age 50); Marseille, France

Sport
- Sport: Gymnastics

Jenny Rolland (born 7 January 1975) is a French gymnast. She competed in six events at the 1992 Summer Olympics.
