= Catherine Daugé =

French gymnast

Personal information
- Nationality: French
- Born: 13 October 1956 (age 68)

Sport
- Sport: Gymnastics

Catherine Daugé (born 13 October 1956) is a French gymnast. She competed at the 1972 Summer Olympics.
