= Virginie Machado =

French gymnast

Personal information
- Nationality: French
- Born: 1 June 1976 (age 49) Hénin-Beaumont, France

Sport
- Sport: Gymnastics

Virginie Machado (born 1 June 1976) is a French gymnast. She competed in six events at the 1992 Summer Olympics.
