= Anne-Marie Bauduin =

French gymnast

Personal information
- Nationality: French
- Born: 6 May 1972 (age 54) Saint-Lô, France

Sport
- Sport: Gymnastics

Anne-Marie Bauduin (born 6 May 1972) is a French former gymnast. She competed in five events at the 1988 Summer Olympics.
