= Katheleen Lindor =

French artistic gymnast

- Born: 30 August 1989 (age 37) Aubergenville, Yvelines, France
- Height: 1.78 m (5 ft 10 in)

Gymnastics career
- Discipline: Women's artistic gymnastics
- Country represented: France (2004-2008)
Medal record
Representing France
Women's artistic gymnastics
Mediterranean Games
Silver medal – second place	2005 Almería	Team

Katheleen Lindor (born 30 August 1989) is a French former female artistic gymnast. She competed at the 2008 Summer Olympics.

== Biography ==
Lindor was born in Aubergenville, Yvelines, France in 1989. She is the twin sister of Lindsay Lindor. Their coach from ages 11 to 19, Éric Besson, described Katheleen as being more aggressive than her sister. Lindor joined the gym INSEP, and her sister followed a year later.

In 2005, she won the French national floor title and in 2007, the all-around title.

Lindor participated in the 2006 World Championships, where she qualified for the individual all-around final, the 2007 World Artistic Gymnastics Championships in Stuttgart, Germany, and the 2008 Summer Olympics in Beijing, China.
