= Jacqueline Brisepierre =

French gymnast (1945–2025)

Personal information
- Nationality: French
- Born: 30 October 1945; Montceau-les-Mines, France
- Died: 8 April 2025 (aged 79); Marseille, France

Sport
- Sport: Gymnastics

Jacqueline Brisepierre (30 October 1945 – 8 April 2025) was a French gymnast. She competed at the 1964 Summer Olympics and the 1968 Summer Olympics. Brisepierre died on 8 April 2025, at the age of 79.
