= Catherine Romano =

French gymnast

Personal information
- Nationality: French
- Born: 9 May 1972 (age 52); Créteil, France

Sport
- Sport: Gymnastics

Catherine Romano (born 9 May 1972) is a French gymnast. She competed in five events at the 1988 Summer Olympics.
