= Renée Hugon =

French gymnast

Personal information
- Nationality: French
- Born: 21 September 1930; Clichy, France
- Died: 7 July 2015 (aged 84); Paris, France

Sport
- Sport: Gymnastics

Renée Jeanne Hugon (21 September 1930 – 7 July 2015) was a French gymnast. She competed in six events at the 1960 Summer Olympics.
