= Émilie Volle =

French gymnast

Personal information
- Nationality: French
- Born: 8 October 1981 (age 44) Saint-Étienne, France

Sport
- Sport: Gymnastics
Medal record
Representing France
Mediterranean Games
| Gold medal – first place | 1997 Bari | Team |

Émilie Volle (born 8 October 1981) is a French gymnast. She competed at the 1996 Summer Olympics. She was also won the gold medal with the French team at the 1997 Mediterranean Games.
