= Gymnastics at the 2004 Summer Olympics – Women's uneven bars =

Women's uneven bars at the Games of the XXVIII Olympiad
- Venue: Olympic Indoor Hall
- Date: 15 August 2004 (qualifying); 22 August 2004 (final)
- Competitors: 85 from 31 nations

Medalists
1st place, gold medalist(s)		Émilie Lepennec	France
2nd place, silver medalist(s)		Terin Humphrey	United States
3rd place, bronze medalist(s)		Courtney Kupets	United States

These are the results of the women's uneven bars competition, one of six events for female competitors of the artistic gymnastics discipline contested in the gymnastics at the 2004 Summer Olympics in Athens. The qualification and final rounds took place on August 15 and August 22 at the Olympic Indoor Hall.

The medals for the competition were presented by Antonio Rodriguez, Argentina; IOC Member, and the medalists' bouquets were presented by Jackie Fie, United States; President of the Women's Technical Committee of the FIG.

== Results ==
=== Qualification ===
Eighty-five gymnasts competed in the uneven bars event in the artistic gymnastics qualification round on August 15. The eight highest scoring gymnasts advanced to the final on August 22.

=== Final ===
Rank	Gymnast	Start Value	Czech Republic	Germany	Japan	Belarus	Greece	Uzbekistan	Penalty	Total
Gold medal	Émilie Lepennec (FRA)	10.00	9.70	9.70	9.60	9.70	9.65	9.75	—	9.687
Silver medal	Terin Humphrey (USA)	10.00	9.65	9.65	9.55	9.70	9.70	9.65	—	9.662
Bronze medal	Courtney Kupets (USA)	10.00	9.65	9.65	9.60	9.65	9.60	9.70	—	9.637
4	Pyon Kwang-sun (PRK)	10.00	9.50	9.60	9.60	9.55	9.65	9.65	—	9.600
5	Li Ya (CHN)	10.00	9.55	9.70	9.55	9.55	9.60	9.55	—	9.562
6	Nicoleta Daniela Șofronie (ROU)	10.00	9.50	9.45	9.30	9.55	9.40	9.50	—	9.462
7	Lin Li (CHN)	9.70	9.25	9.10	9.20	9.00	9.25	9.25	—	9.200
8	Svetlana Khorkina (RUS)	9.70	8.95	8.90	8.90	8.90	8.95	8.95	—	8.925
