= Karine Charlier =

French gymnast

Carine Charlier
Personal information
- Nationality: French
- Born: 22 January 1977 (age 48); Créteil, France

Sport
- Sport: Gymnastics

Carine Charlier (born 22 January 1977) is a French gymnast. She competed in six events at the 1992 Summer Olympics.
