= Jacqueline Dieudonné =

French gymnast (1933–2026)

Personal information
- Nationality: French
- Born: 30 June 1933 Mérignac, France
- Died: 1 September 2026 (aged 93) Villeneuve-Loubet, France

Sport
- Sport: Gymnastics

Jacqueline Dieudonné (30 June 1933 – 1 September 2026) was a French gymnast. She competed at the 1956 Summer Olympics and the 1960 Summer Olympics.

Dieudonné died on 1 September 2026, at the age of 93.
