= Pauline Morel =

French artistic gymnast

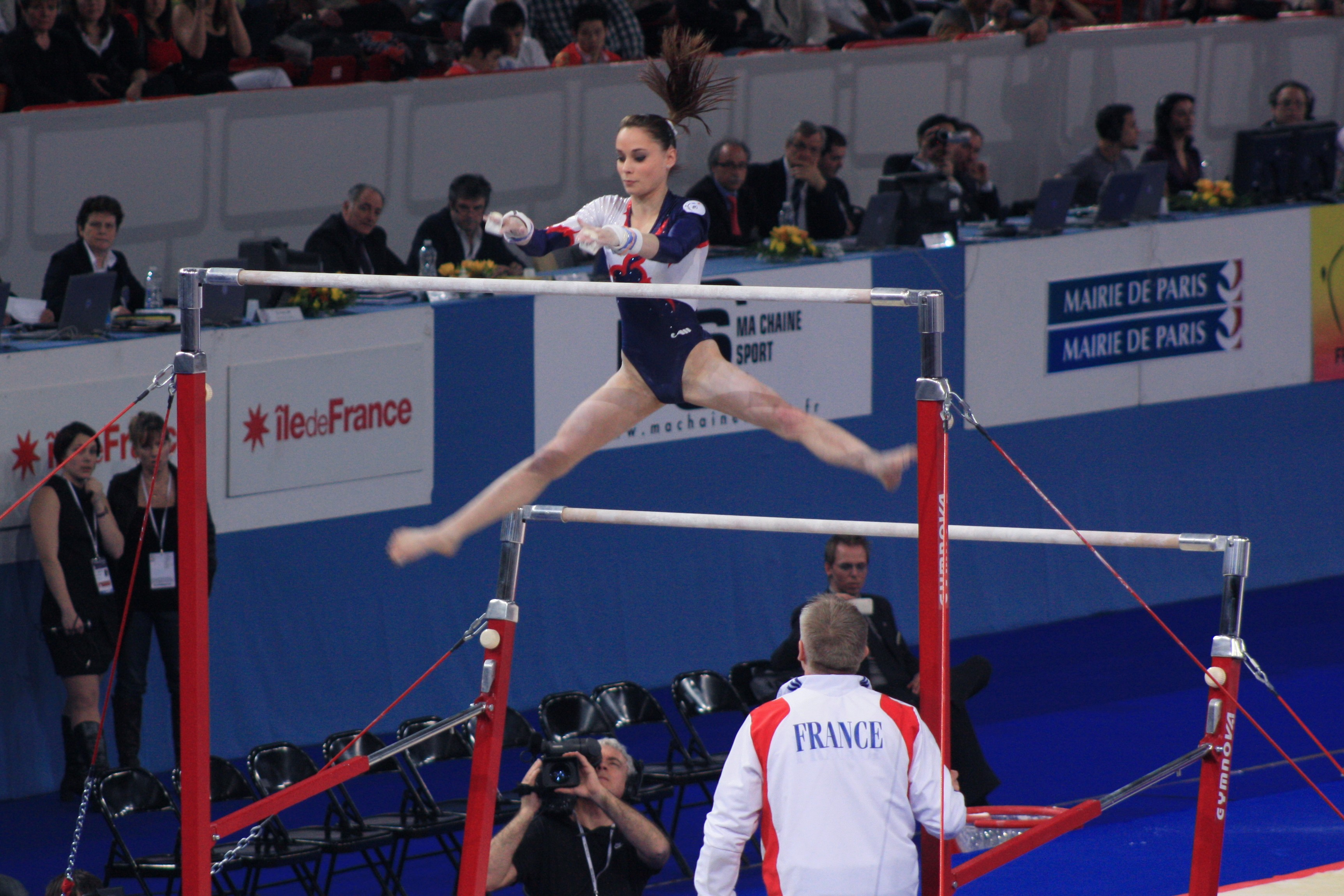

Personal information
- Born: January 3, 1992 (age 34)

Gymnastics career
- Discipline: Women's artistic gymnastics
- Country represented: France (2010)

Pauline Morel (born 3 January 1992) is a French female artistic gymnast and part of the national team.

She participated at the 2008 Summer Olympics. She participated at the 2010 World Artistic Gymnastics Championships in Rotterdam, the Netherlands.

== Life ==
Pauline Morel began artistic gymnastics in 1999 at the age of 7. She started out at A.S.C of Chevigny (which later became Chevigny Gym), before joining Alliance Dijon gym 21 and the Dijon "Pôle Espoir".

She became a member of the French team in 2007 and joined the INSEP in Paris. That year, she helped French qualify for the Olympic Games in Beijing.

In 2008, for the first time of the history of French gymnastics, she stood on the European team podium with the French team. In August 2008, Pauline Morel took part in the Olympic Games aged just 16, finishing 7th in the team event and 28th in the individual event. A double fall on the beam prevented her from reaching the final on this apparatus.

During the 2008-2009 season, as the INSEP was being renovated, she returned to train in Dijon.

She won three medals in the 2009 Mediterranean Games. In September 2009, she returned to the INSEP. At the 2009 World Championships, she came 15th in the individual event and 12th on the uneven bars. She then came 4th in the team event at the 2010 European Championships. In 2010, she obtained her Bac S (a French diploma) and left her club ADG21 to join Élan Gymnastique Rouennais.

In October 2010, Pauline Morel was selected for the World Championships, finishing 11th in the team event and 34th in the individual event. In June 2011, Pauline came 4th in the team event at the French Championships and put an end to her sporting career.

Following the end of her sportive career, she took a work-linked BTS in cosmetics.

== Awards ==
=== Olympics Games ===
- Beijing 2008
  - 7th in the team competition

=== World Championships ===
- Stuttgart 2007
  - 6th in the team competition
  - 21st in the individual all around competition
- London 2009
  - 15th in the individual all around competition

=== European Championships ===
- Clermont-Ferrand 2008
  - Europe bronze medal in the team competition
  - 4th on beam
- Birmingham 2010
  - 4th in team competition

=== Mediterranean Games ===
- Pescara 2009
  - Gold medal in team competition
  - Silver medal uneven bars
  - Bronze medal in the individual all around competition
