= Chloé Maigre =

French gymnast

Personal information
- Nationality: French
- Born: 24 December 1974 (age 50); Niamey, Niger

Sport
- Sport: Gymnastics

Chloé Maigre (born 24 December 1974) is a French gymnast. She competed in six events at the 1992 Summer Olympics.
