= Anne-Sophie Endeler =

French gymnast

Personal information
- Nationality: French
- Born: 5 May 1984 (age 40); Pointe des Galets, Réunion

Sport
- Sport: Gymnastics

Anne-Sophie Endeler (born 5 May 1984) is a French gymnast. She competed at the 2000 Summer Olympics.
