= Camille Schmutz =

French artistic gymnast

- Born: 30 September 1988 (age 37) Paris, France

Gymnastics career
- Discipline: Women's artistic gymnastics
- Country represented: France (2004)

Camille Schmutz (born 30 September 1988) is a French female former artistic gymnast, representing her nation at international competitions.

She participated at the 2004 Summer Olympics.
