= Florence Laborderie =

Artistic gymnast

Florence Laborderie (born 7 September 1969) is a former artistic gymnast. She competed at the 1984 Summer Olympics.
