= Monique Rossi =

French gymnast

Personal information
- Nationality: French
- Born: 16 December 1937; Montceau-les-Mines, France
- Died: 24 August 2018 (aged 80)

Sport
- Sport: Gymnastics

Monique Rossi (16 December 1937 – 24 August 2018) was a French gymnast. She competed in six events at the 1960 Summer Olympics.
