= Elvire Gertosio =

French gymnast

Personal information
- Nationality: French
- Born: 20 May 1948
- Died: between 1972 and 1976

Sport
- Sport: Gymnastics

Elvire Gertosio (born 20 May 1948, died between 1972 and 1976) was a French gymnast. She competed at the 1972 Summer Olympics.
