= Madeleine Jouffroy =

French gymnast

Personal information
- Nationality: French
- Born: 20 November 1927 (age 97); Chalon-sur-Saône, France

Sport
- Sport: Gymnastics

Madeleine Jouffroy (born 20 November 1927) is a French gymnast. She competed in seven events at the 1952 Summer Olympics.
