= Jeanette Vogelbacher =

French gymnast (1922–2018)

Personal information
- Nationality: French
- Born: 2 February 1922 Belfort, France
- Died: 10 November 2018 (aged 96) Dreux, Eure-et-Loir
- Spouse: Amand Solbach

Sport
- Sport: Gymnastics
Medal record
Representing France
World Championships
Silver medal – second place	1950 Basel	Team

Jeanette Vogelbacher Solbach (2 February 1922 – 10 November 2018) was a French gymnast. She competed at the 1948 Summer Olympics and the 1952 Summer Olympics. She was a member of the French team that took the silver at the 1950 World Championships in Basel. She was the French champion in 1948, 1949, and 1950. She was married to fellow Olympian Amand Solbach, who died in 1967.
