= Ginette Durand =

French gymnast (1929–2018)

Personal information
- Nationality: French
- Born: 5 April 1929; Roanne
- Died: 29 March 2018 (aged 88); Orange, Vaucluse

Sport
- Sport: Gymnastics

Ginette Durand (5 April 1929 – 29 March 2018) was a French gymnast. She competed in seven events at the 1952 Summer Olympics.
