= Falaise, Ardennes =

Falaise
- Commune
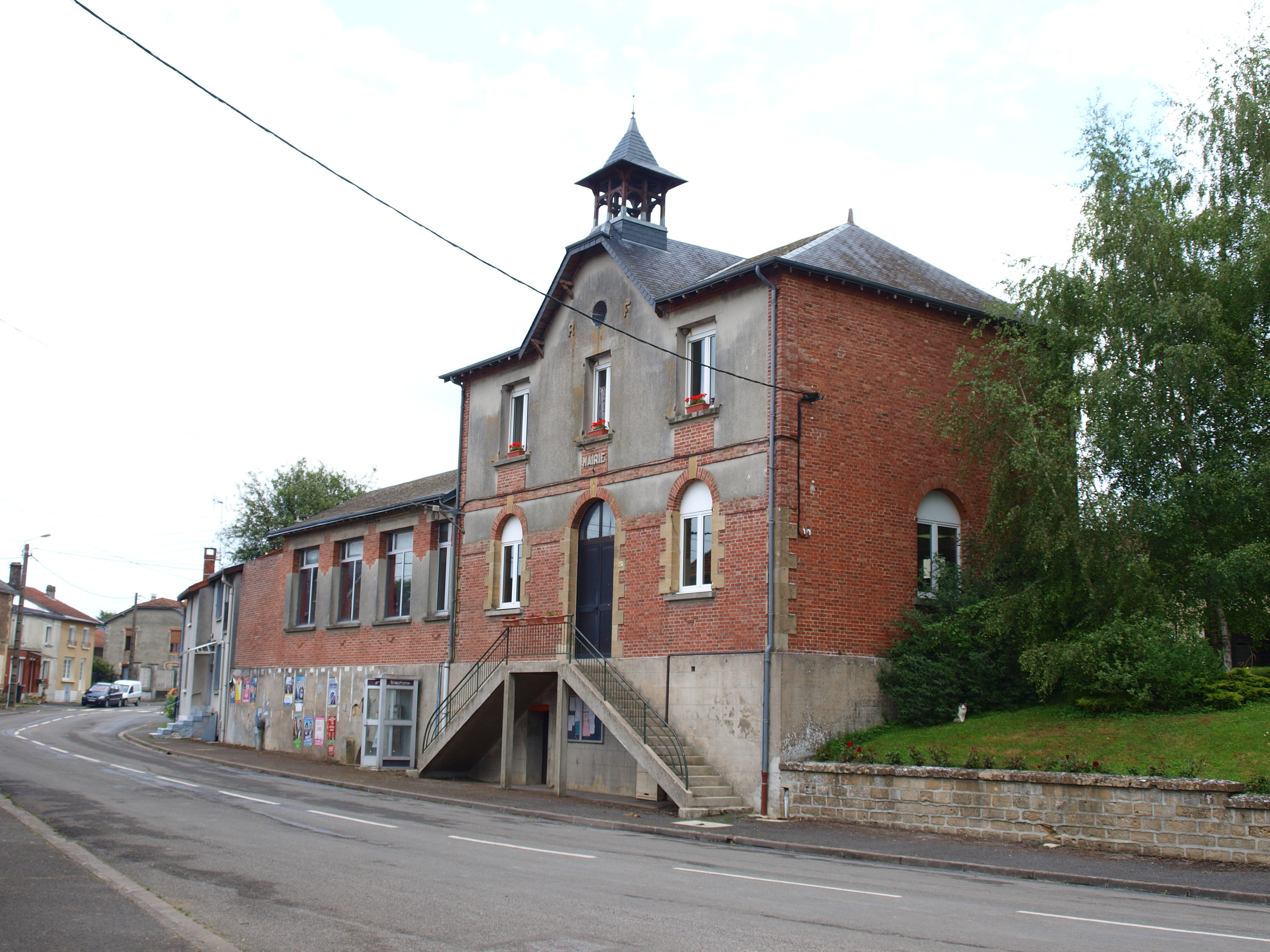
- The town hall in Falaise

- Coat of arms
- Location of Falaise
- Location within France Location within Grand Est
- Coordinates: 49°22′45″N 4°43′48″E
- Country: France
- Region: Grand Est
- Department: Ardennes
- Arrondissement: Vouziers
- Canton: Attigny
- Intercommunality: Argonne Ardennaise

Government
  - Mayor (2020–2026): Jacques Lantenois
- Area^{1}: 9.52 km^{2} (3.68 sq mi)
- Elevation: 120 m (390 ft)
- Population (2023): 346
  - Density: 36.3/km^{2} (94.1/sq mi)
- Time zone: UTC+01:00 (CET)
  - Summer (DST): UTC+02:00 (CEST)
- INSEE/Postal code: 08164 /08400
- ^{1} French Land Register data, which excludes lakes, ponds, glaciers > 1 km^{2} (0.386 sq mi or 247 acres) and river estuaries.

Falaise (French pronunciation: [falɛz]) is a commune in the Ardennes department in northern France.

== Population ==
Historical population
Year	Pop.	±% p.a.
1968	306	—
1975	269	−1.82%
1982	253	−0.87%
1990	326	+3.22%
1999	326	+0.00%
2007	344	+0.67%
2012	332	−0.71%
2017	331	−0.06%
2023	346	+0.74%
Source: INSEE

== See also ==
- Communes of the Ardennes department
