= Liliane Montagne =

French gymnast

Personal information
- Nationality: French
- Born: 16 March 1931 Lille, France

Sport
- Sport: Gymnastics

Liliane Montagne (born 16 March 1931) is a French former gymnast. She competed in seven events at the 1952 Summer Olympics.
