= Colette Hué =

French gymnast

Personal information
- Nationality: French
- Born: 11 May 1932; Paris, France
- Died: 31 March 2007 (aged 74); Sète, France

Sport
- Sport: Gymnastics

Colette Francoise Hué (11 May 1932 – 31 March 2007) was a French gymnast. She competed at the 1948 Summer Olympics and the 1952 Summer Olympics.
