= Irène Pittelioen =

French gymnast

Personal information
- Full name: Irène Maria Paule Pittelioen
- Nationality: French
- Born: 13 May 1927; Lille, France
- Died: 21 August 2011 (aged 84); Roubaix, France

Sport
- Sport: Gymnastics

Irène Pittelioen (13 May 1927 – 21 August 2011) was a French gymnast. She competed at the 1948 Summer Olympics and the 1952 Summer Olympics.
