= Alexandra Lemoine =

French gymnast (born 1928)

- Born: 1 April 1928

Gymnastics career
- Discipline: Women's artistic gymnastics
- Country represented: France
Medal record
Women's artistic gymnastics
Representing France
World Championships
Silver medal – second place	1950 Basel	Team
Bronze medal – third place	1950 Basel	Vault

Alexandra Lemoine (born 1 April 1928) is a French former artistic gymnast. She competed at the 1952 Summer Olympics. She was born in Dachnów, Poland. Additionally, she also competed at the 1950 World Artistic Gymnastics Championships where she helped her French team to silver and won an individual bronze medal on the vault apparatus.

== Biography ==
At the 1950 World Artistic Gymnastics Championships, she won the bronze medal in the Vault (gymnastics).

She was crowned French Gymnastics Championships in the all-around competition in 1952 and 1953.

At the age of 24, she competed in the 1952 Summer Olympics in Helsinki, but did not place on the podium.
