= Gymnastics at the 1960 Summer Olympics – Men's horizontal bar =

Men's horizontal bar at the Games of the XVII Olympiad
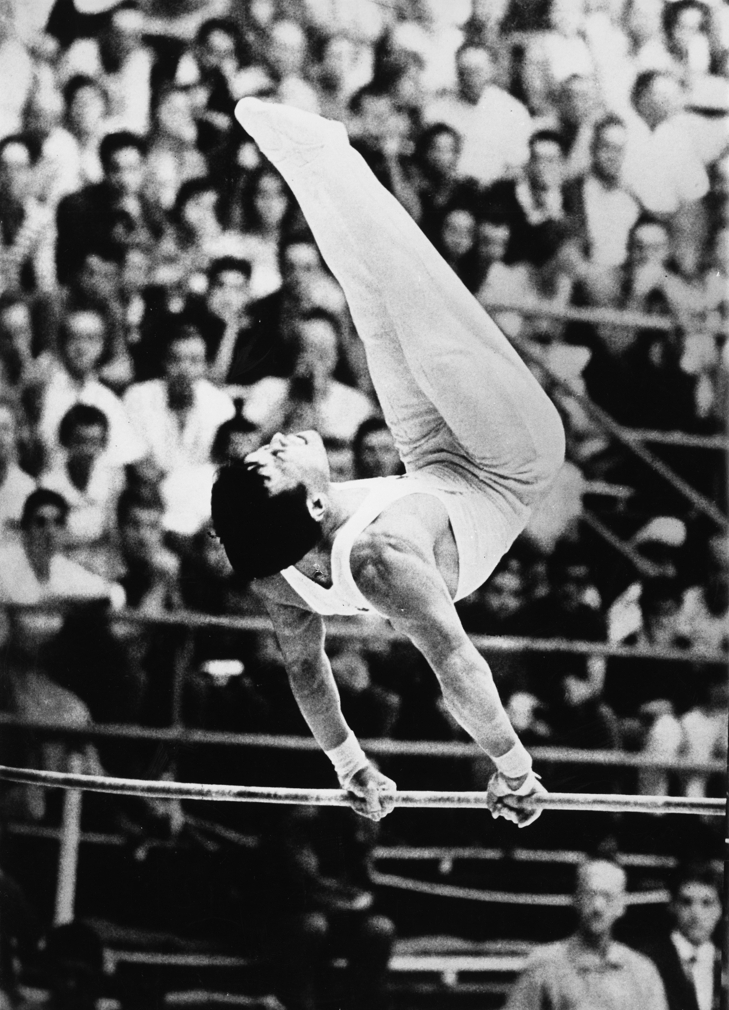
- Takashi Ono competing on the horizontal bar
- Venue: Baths of Caracalla
- Dates: 5–10 September 1960
- Competitors: 130 from 28 nations
- Winning score: 19.600

Medalists
1st place, gold medalist(s)		Takashi Ono; Japan
2nd place, silver medalist(s)		Masao Takemoto; Japan
3rd place, bronze medalist(s)		Boris Shakhlin; Soviet Union

The men's horizontal bar competition was one of eight events for male competitors in artistic gymnastics at the 1960 Summer Olympics in Rome. It was held on 5, 7, and 10 September at the Baths of Caracalla. There were 130 competitors from 28 nations, with nations in the team competition having up to 6 gymnasts and other nations entering up to 2 gymnasts. The event was won by Takashi Ono of Japan, the nation's second consecutive victory in the men's parallel bars (tying the United States for second-most all-time). Masao Takemoto gave Japan a second medal with his silver. Ono and Takemoto were the third and fourth men to win multiple medals in the parallel bars; Ono was the first to win two gold medals in the event. Boris Shakhlin of the Soviet Union took bronze.

The 1960 gymnastics competitions introduced apparatus finals, with the all-around competition serving as a qualifying round for the parallel bars final.

== Background ==
This was the 10th appearance of the event, which is one of the five apparatus events held every time there were apparatus events at the Summer Olympics (no apparatus events were held in 1900, 1908, 1912, or 1920). Seven of the top 12 (including ties for 10th) gymnasts from 1956 returned: gold medalist Takashi Ono of Japan, silver medalist Yury Titov of the Soviet Union, bronze medalist Masao Takemoto of Japan, seventh-place finisher Jack Beckner of the United States, eighth-place finisher Albert Azaryan of the Soviet Union, ninth-place finisher Ferdinand Daniš of Czechoslovakia, and tenth-place finisher Stoyan Stoyanov of Bulgaria. Boris Shakhlin of the Soviet Union was the reigning (1958) world champion, with Azaryan second, Titov and Takemoto tied for third, and Ono sixth.

Morocco and South Korea each made their debut in the men's parallel bars; the short-lived United Arab Republic made its only appearance. The United States made its ninth appearance, most of any nation, having missed only the inaugural 1896 Games.

== Competition format ==
The gymnastics all-around events continued to use the aggregation format. Each nation entered a team of six gymnasts or up to two individual gymnasts. All entrants in the gymnastics competitions performed both a compulsory exercise and a voluntary exercise for each apparatus. The scores for all 12 exercises were summed to give an individual all-around score.

These exercise scores were also used for qualification for the new apparatus finals. The two exercises (compulsory and voluntary) for each apparatus were summed to give an apparatus score; the top 6 in each apparatus participated in the finals; others were ranked 7th through 130th. For the apparatus finals, the all-around score for that apparatus was multiplied by one-half then added to the final round exercise score to give a final total.

Exercise scores ranged from 0 to 10, with the final total apparatus score from 0 to 20.

== Schedule ==
All times are Central European Time (UTC+1)

Date	Time	Round
Monday, 5 September 1960	8:00; 17:00	Preliminary: Compulsory
Wednesday, 7 September 1960	8:00; 17:00	Preliminary: Voluntary
Saturday, 10 September 1960	15:00	Final

== Results ==
Rank	Gymnast	Nation	Preliminary			Final		
Rank	Gymnast	Nation	Compulsory	Voluntary	Total	1/2 Prelim.	Final	Total
1st place, gold medalist(s)	Takashi Ono	Japan	9.80	9.80	19.60	9.800	9.800	19.600
2nd place, silver medalist(s)	Masao Takemoto	Japan	9.80	9.75	19.55	9.775	9.750	19.525
3rd place, bronze medalist(s)	Boris Shakhlin	Soviet Union	9.80	9.75	19.55	9.775	9.700	19.475
4	Yukio Endo	Japan	9.70	9.75	19.45	9.725	9.700	19.425
5	Yury Titov	Soviet Union	9.70	9.80	19.50	9.750	9.650	19.400
5	Miroslav Cerar	Yugoslavia	9.65	9.85	19.50	9.750	9.650	19.400
7	Albert Azaryan	Soviet Union	9.75	9.70	19.45	Did not advance		
8	Shuji Tsurumi	Japan	9.50	9.75	19.25	Did not advance		
9	Takashi Mitsukuri	Japan	9.55	9.65	19.20	Did not advance		
9	Valery Kerdemelidi	Soviet Union	9.55	9.65	19.20	Did not advance		
11	Ferdinand Daniš	Czechoslovakia	9.50	9.65	19.15	Did not advance		
12	Otto Kestola	Finland	9.50	9.60	19.10	Did not advance		
13	Nobuyuki Aihara	Japan	9.50	9.50	19.00	Did not advance		
13	Vladimir Portnoy	Soviet Union	9.50	9.50	19.00	Did not advance		
15	Abie Grossfeld	United States	9.30	9.65	18.95	Did not advance		
16	Jaroslav Šťastný	Czechoslovakia	9.30	9.60	18.90	Did not advance		
17	Nikolai Miligulo	Soviet Union	9.40	9.45	18.85	Did not advance		
17	Josy Stoffel	Luxembourg	9.45	9.40	18.85	Did not advance		
17	Armand Huberty	Luxembourg	9.30	9.55	18.85	Did not advance		
20	Franco Menichelli	Italy	9.40	9.40	18.80	Did not advance		
20	Rajmund Csányi	Hungary	9.40	9.40	18.80	Did not advance		
22	Jaroslav Bím	Czechoslovakia	9.30	9.45	18.75	Did not advance		
22	Raimo Heinonen	Finland	9.40	9.35	18.75	Did not advance		
22	Jack Beckner	United States	9.25	9.50	18.75	Did not advance		
22	Eugen Ekman	Finland	9.30	9.45	18.75	Did not advance		
26	Stoyan Stoyanov	Bulgaria	9.15	9.55	18.70	Did not advance		
26	Velik Kapsazov	Bulgaria	9.25	9.45	18.70	Did not advance		
28	Giovanni Carminucci	Italy	9.35	9.30	18.65	Did not advance		
28	Michel Mathiot	France	9.20	9.45	18.65	Did not advance		
28	Mohamed Lazhari	France	9.35	9.30	18.65	Did not advance		
31	Karlheinz Friedrich	United Team of Germany	9.15	9.45	18.60	Did not advance		
31	Ivan Čaklec	Yugoslavia	9.30	9.30	18.60	Did not advance		
33	Olavi Leimuvirta	Finland	9.15	9.40	18.55	Did not advance		
33	Günter Lyhs	United Team of Germany	9.15	9.40	18.55	Did not advance		
33	Don Tonry	United States	9.05	9.50	18.55	Did not advance		
33	Pavel Gajdoš	Czechoslovakia	9.30	9.25	18.55	Did not advance		
33	Orlando Polmonari	Italy	9.25	9.30	18.55	Did not advance		
38	Andrzej Konopka	Poland	9.20	9.30	18.50	Did not advance		
38	Larry Banner	United States	9.10	9.40	18.50	Did not advance		
38	Lyuben Khristov	Bulgaria	9.20	9.30	18.50	Did not advance		
38	Ernest Hawełek	Poland	9.20	9.30	18.50	Did not advance		
42	Ernst Fivian	Switzerland	9.20	9.25	18.45	Did not advance		
42	André Brüllmann	Switzerland	9.25	9.20	18.45	Did not advance		
42	Edy Thomi	Switzerland	9.00	9.45	18.45	Did not advance		
42	Erwin Koppe	United Team of Germany	9.00	9.45	18.45	Did not advance		
46	Max Benker	Switzerland	9.10	9.30	18.40	Did not advance		
46	Lajos Varga	Hungary	9.20	9.20	18.40	Did not advance		
46	Kauko Heikkinen	Finland	9.20	9.20	18.40	Did not advance		
46	Bernard Fauqueux	France	9.20	9.20	18.40	Did not advance		
50	Pasquale Carminucci	Italy	9.05	9.30	18.35	Did not advance		
50	Alojz Petrovič	Yugoslavia	9.05	9.30	18.35	Did not advance		
50	Siegfried Fülle	United Team of Germany	9.15	9.20	18.35	Did not advance		
50	Nikola Prodanov	Bulgaria	9.05	9.30	18.35	Did not advance		
54	Angelo Vicardi	Italy	9.30	9.00	18.30	Did not advance		
54	Ladislav Pazdera	Czechoslovakia	9.00	9.30	18.30	Did not advance		
56	Alfred Kucharczyk	Poland	9.10	9.15	18.25	Did not advance		
56	Nik Stuart	Great Britain	8.95	9.30	18.25	Did not advance		
56	Johann König	Austria	9.10	9.15	18.25	Did not advance		
59	Åge Storhaug	Norway	9.00	9.20	18.20	Did not advance		
59	Todor Bachvarov	Bulgaria	9.00	9.20	18.20	Did not advance		
61	Gar O'Quinn	United States	8.95	9.20	18.15	Did not advance		
61	Ahmed Dakkeli	United Arab Republic	9.00	9.15	18.15	Did not advance		
61	Jean Jaillard	France	9.10	9.05	18.15	Did not advance		
64	Milenko Lekić	Yugoslavia	9.20	8.90	18.10	Did not advance		
65	Josef Trmal	Czechoslovakia	9.15	8.90	18.05	Did not advance		
65	Daniel Touche	France	9.05	9.00	18.05	Did not advance		
65	János Mester	Hungary	9.10	8.95	18.05	Did not advance		
65	Józef Rajnisz	Poland	8.85	9.20	18.05	Did not advance		
65	Graham Bond	Australia	9.00	9.05	18.05	Did not advance		
70	Ismail Abdallah	United Arab Republic	9.10	8.90	18.00	Did not advance		
70	Rudolf Keszthelyi	Hungary	9.00	9.00	18.00	Did not advance		
72	Sakari Olkkonen	Finland	8.95	9.00	17.95	Did not advance		
72	Marsel Markulin	Yugoslavia	9.10	8.85	17.95	Did not advance		
72	Hans Sauter	Austria	8.85	9.10	17.95	Did not advance		
72	Ken Buffin	Great Britain	9.00	8.95	17.95	Did not advance		
76	Robert Caymaris	France	8.90	9.00	17.90	Did not advance		
76	Gianfranco Marzolla	Italy	8.70	9.20	17.90	Did not advance		
78	Georgi Khristov	Bulgaria	9.00	8.85	17.85	Did not advance		
78	Michel Kiesgen	Luxembourg	8.90	8.95	17.85	Did not advance		
80	Stig Lindewall	Sweden	8.80	9.00	17.80	Did not advance		
81	Hans Schwarzentruber	Switzerland	9.10	8.65	17.75	Did not advance		
81	Kurt Wigartz	Sweden	8.60	9.15	17.75	Did not advance		
81	Günter Nachtigall	United Team of Germany	9.10	8.65	17.75	Did not advance		
84	Jerzy Jokiel	Poland	9.15	8.50	17.65	Did not advance		
84	Jean Cronstedt	Sweden	9.30	8.35	17.65	Did not advance		
86	Marcel Coppin	Luxembourg	8.80	8.80	17.60	Did not advance		
87	Fritz Feuz	Switzerland	9.20	8.35	17.55	Did not advance		
87	Kim Sang-guk	South Korea	8.45	9.10	17.55	Did not advance		
87	Ahmed Goneim	United Arab Republic	8.65	8.90	17.55	Did not advance		
90	Hermann Klien	Austria	8.75	8.75	17.50	Did not advance		
91	Fred Orlofsky	United States	9.15	8.30	17.45	Did not advance		
91	Dick Gradley	Great Britain	8.55	8.90	17.45	Did not advance		
93	Ahmed Issam Allam	United Arab Republic	8.50	8.90	17.40	Did not advance		
93	Aleksander Rokosa	Poland	9.20	8.20	17.40	Did not advance		
93	Willi Kafel	Austria	8.50	8.90	17.40	Did not advance		
96	Richard Montpetit	Canada	8.60	8.75	17.35	Did not advance		
97	Emilio Lecuona	Spain	8.25	9.00	17.25	Did not advance		
98	Bo Wirhed	Sweden	8.20	9.00	17.20	Did not advance		
99	Géza Bejek	Hungary	8.70	8.30	17.00	Did not advance		
100	Jaime Belenguer	Spain	8.20	8.70	16.90	Did not advance		
101	Anton Hertl	Austria	8.30	8.45	16.75	Did not advance		
102	Ramón García	Spain	8.20	8.50	16.70	Did not advance		
103	Dragan Gagić	Yugoslavia	9.15	7.50	16.65	Did not advance		
104	Leif Koorn	Sweden	7.90	8.60	16.50	Did not advance		
104	Juan Caviglia	Argentina	8.35	8.15	16.50	Did not advance		
106	Abdel Vares Sharraf	United Arab Republic	7.85	8.45	16.30	Did not advance		
107	Selim El-Sayed	United Arab Republic	8.05	8.20	16.25	Did not advance		
108	John Mulhall	Great Britain	8.00	7.95	15.95	Did not advance		
109	William Thoresson	Sweden	8.25	7.65	15.90	Did not advance		
110	Benjamin de Roo	Australia	7.90	7.75	15.65	Did not advance		
110	Gerhard Huber	Austria	7.85	7.80	15.65	Did not advance		
112	Sándor Békési	Hungary	6.30	9.15	15.45	Did not advance		
113	Enrique Montserrat	Spain	7.00	8.25	15.25	Did not advance		
114	Hermenegildo Candeias	Portugal	7.75	7.45	15.20	Did not advance		
115	René Marteaux	Belgium	7.05	8.00	15.05	Did not advance		
116	Jack Pancott	Great Britain	8.10	6.90	15.00	Did not advance		
117	François Eisenbarth	Luxembourg	7.45	7.30	14.75	Did not advance		
118	Léopold Desmet	Belgium	6.95	7.20	14.15	Did not advance		
119	Philipp Fürst	United Team of Germany	9.35	4.50	13.85	Did not advance		
120	Hubert Erang	Luxembourg	7.60	5.50	13.10	Did not advance		
121	Armando Valles	Mexico	7.80	4.00	11.80	Did not advance		
122	Luis Valbuena	Spain	3.00	8.05	11.05	Did not advance		
123	Ahmed Fellat	Morocco	5.00	5.80	10.80	Did not advance		
124	Mohamed Sekkat	Morocco	5.50	4.95	10.45	Did not advance		
125	Abdesselem Regragui	Morocco	4.00	5.15	9.15	Did not advance		
126	Peter Starling	Great Britain	7.65	—	7.65	Did not advance		
127	Miloud M'Sellek	Morocco	1.00	6.35	7.35	Did not advance		
128	Hermenegildo Martínez	Spain	6.40	—	6.40	Did not advance		
129	Darif Tanjaoui	Morocco	3.00	3.00	6.00	Did not advance		
130	Kacem Klifa	Morocco	—	4.00	4.00	Did not advance		
