= Gymnastics at the 1960 Summer Olympics – Men's artistic individual all-around =

Olympic gymnastics event

Men's artistic individual all-around at the Games of the XVII Olympiad
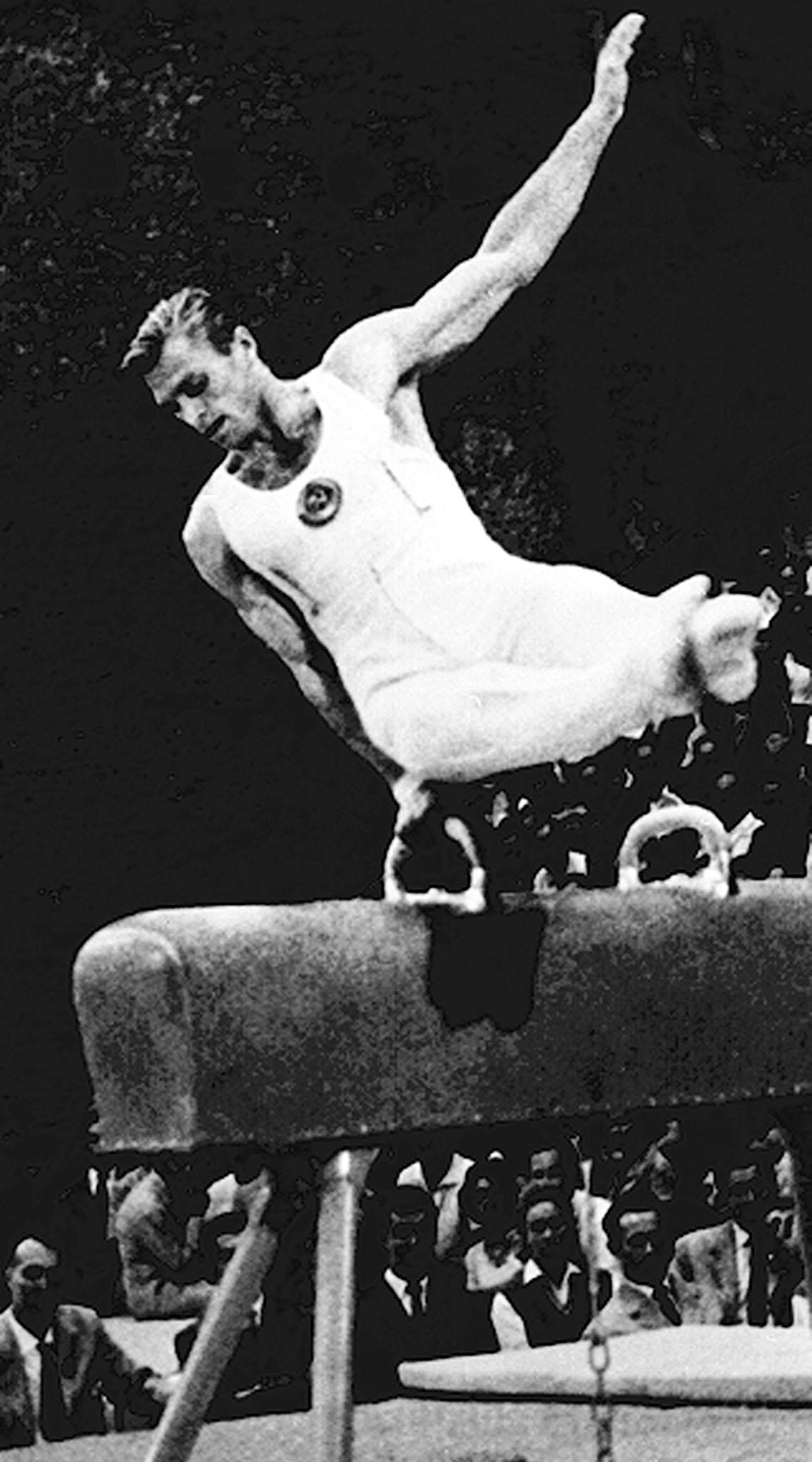
- Gold medalist Boris Shakhlin during the pommel horse segment
- Venue: Baths of Caracalla
- Dates: 5–7 September 1960
- Competitors: 130 from 27 nations
- Winning score: 115.95

Medalists
| 1st place, gold medalist(s) | | Boris Shakhlin; Soviet Union |
| 2nd place, silver medalist(s) | | Takashi Ono; Japan |
| 3rd place, bronze medalist(s) | | Yuri Titov; Soviet Union |

The men's artistic individual all-around competition at the 1960 Summer Olympics was held at the Baths of Caracalla from 5 to 7 September. It was the thirteenth appearance of the event. There were 130 competitors from 28 nations. Each nation entered a team of six gymnasts or up to two individual gymnasts. The event was won by Boris Shakhlin of the Soviet Union, the nation's third consecutive victory in the event, putting the Soviets second all-time to that point (behind Italy's four). Takashi Ono of Japan and Yuri Titov of the Soviet Union repeated as silver and bronze medalists, respectively; they were the fifth and sixth men to earn multiple medals in the event.

== Background ==
This was the 13th appearance of the men's individual all-around. The first individual all-around competition had been held in 1900, after the 1896 competitions featured only individual apparatus events. A men's individual all-around has been held every Games since 1900.

Six of the top 10 gymnasts from the 1956 Games returned: silver medalist Takashi Ono, fourth-place finisher Masao Takemoto, and tenth-place finisher Nobuyuki Aihara of Japan and bronze medalist Yury Titov, seventh-place finisher Albert Azaryan, and eighth-place finisher Boris Shakhlin of the Soviet Union. Shakhlin was the reigning (1958) World Champion, with Ono and Titov finishing second and third.

Morocco, South Korea, and the United Arab Republic each made their debut in the event. France and Italy both made their 11th appearance, tied for most among nations.

== Competition format ==
The gymnastics all-around events continued to use the aggregation format. All entrants in the gymnastics competitions performed both a compulsory exercise and a voluntary exercise for each apparatus. The scores for all 12 exercises were summed to give an individual all-around score.

These exercise scores were also used for qualification for the new apparatus finals. The two exercises (compulsory and voluntary) for each apparatus were summed to give an apparatus score; the top 6 in each apparatus participated in the finals; others were ranked 7th through 130th. There was no all-around final.

Exercise scores ranged from 0 to 10, apparatus scores from 0 to 20, and individual totals from 0 to 120.

== Schedule ==
All times are Central European Time (UTC+1)

| Date | Time | Round |
|---|---|---|
| Monday, 5 September 1960 | 8:00; 17:00 | Preliminary: Compulsory |
| Wednesday, 7 September 1960 | 8:00; 17:00 | Preliminary: Voluntary |

== Results ==
| Rank | Gymnast | Nation | Apparatus results | | | | | | | | | | | | Total |
| Rank | Gymnast | Nation | Floor (gymnastics) | | Rings (gymnastics) | | Pommel horse | | Vault (gymnastics) | | Parallel bars | | Horizontal bar | | Total |
| Rank | Gymnast | Nation | Score | Rank | Score | Rank | Score | Rank | Score | Rank | Score | Rank | Score | Rank | Total |
|---|---|---|---|---|---|---|---|---|---|---|---|---|---|---|---|
| 1st place, gold medalist(s) | Boris Shakhlin | Soviet Union | 18.95 | 7 | 19.50 | 2 | 19.35 | 1 | 19.20 | 3 | 19.40 | 1 | 19.55 | 3 | 115.95 |
| 2nd place, silver medalist(s) | Takashi Ono | Japan | 19.00 | 4 | 19.45 | 3 | 19.15 | 4 | 19.30 | 1 | 19.40 | 1 | 19.60 | 1 | 115.90 |
| 3rd place, bronze medalist(s) | Yury Titov | Soviet Union | 19.25 | 2 | 19.45 | 4 | 19.20 | 3 | 19.00 | 5 | 19.20 | 6 | 19.50 | 4 | 115.60 |
| 4 | Shuji Tsurumi | Japan | 18.85 | 13 | 19.20 | 9 | 19.10 | 6 | 19.00 | 5 | 19.15 | 8 | 19.25 | 8 | 114.55 |
| 5 | Yukio Endo | Japan | 18.90 | 10 | 19.00 | 12 | 18.85 | 10 | 19.05 | 4 | 19.20 | 6 | 19.45 | 6 | 114.45 |
| 5 | Masao Takemoto | Japan | 18.80 | 14 | 19.25 | 8 | 18.60 | 26 | 19.00 | 5 | 19.25 | 4 | 19.55 | 2 | 114.45 |
| 7 | Nobuyuki Aihara | Japan | 19.30 | 1 | 19.40 | 5 | 18.60 | 26 | 18.85 | 9 | 19.25 | 4 | 19.00 | 13 | 114.40 |
| 8 | Miroslav Cerar | Yugoslavia | 18.75 | 17 | 19.05 | 11 | 19.05 | 7 | 18.75 | 13 | 19.15 | 8 | 19.50 | 4 | 114.25 |
| 9 | Takashi Mitsukuri | Japan | 19.00 | 4 | 19.00 | 12 | 19.15 | 4 | 18.95 | 8 | 18.80 | 19 | 19.20 | 9 | 114.10 |
| 10 | Franco Menichelli | Italy | 19.05 | 3 | 19.30 | 7 | 18.65 | 23 | 18.85 | 9 | 19.15 | 8 | 18.80 | 20 | 113.80 |
| 11 | Albert Azaryan | Soviet Union | 18.55 | 24 | 19.75 | 1 | 18.55 | 30 | 18.70 | 14 | 18.35 | 46 | 19.45 | 6 | 113.35 |
| 12 | Vladimir Portnoy | Soviet Union | 18.95 | 7 | 19.00 | 12 | 18.70 | 18 | 19.25 | 2 | 18.40 | 42 | 19.00 | 13 | 113.30 |
| 13 | Nikolai Miligulo | Soviet Union | 18.80 | 14 | 19.00 | 12 | 18.85 | 10 | 18.80 | 12 | 18.75 | 23 | 18.85 | 17 | 113.05 |
| 14 | Giovanni Carminucci | Italy | 18.50 | 26 | 18.40 | 46 | 18.55 | 30 | 18.85 | 9 | 19.35 | 3 | 18.65 | 28 | 112.30 |
| 15 | Ferdinand Daniš | Czechoslovakia | 18.70 | 19 | 18.80 | 21 | 18.30 | 42 | 18.35 | 28 | 18.80 | 19 | 19.15 | 11 | 112.10 |
| 16 | Otto Kestola | Finland | 18.75 | 17 | 18.90 | 19 | 18.15 | 51 | 18.10 | 46 | 19.00 | 14 | 19.10 | 12 | 112.00 |
| 17 | Valery Kerdemelidi | Soviet Union | 18.80 | 14 | 19.20 | 9 | 18.80 | 12 | 18.60 | 16 | 17.35 | 97 | 19.20 | 9 | 111.95 |
| 18 | Jaroslav Šťastný | Czechoslovakia | 19.00 | 4 | 17.95 | 77 | 18.80 | 12 | 18.45 | 20 | 18.40 | 42 | 18.90 | 16 | 111.50 |
| 18 | Josy Stoffel | Luxembourg | 18.25 | 46 | 18.55 | 39 | 18.70 | 18 | 18.45 | 20 | 18.70 | 26 | 18.85 | 17 | 111.50 |
| 20 | Velik Kapsazov | Bulgaria | 18.25 | 46 | 19.35 | 6 | 18.30 | 42 | 17.95 | 58 | 18.60 | 31 | 18.70 | 26 | 111.15 |
| 21 | Ernst Fivian | Switzerland | 18.95 | 7 | 18.00 | 73 | 18.15 | 51 | 18.45 | 20 | 19.05 | 13 | 18.45 | 42 | 111.05 |
| 21 | Larry Banner | United States | 18.30 | 39 | 18.80 | 21 | 19.00 | 8 | 18.35 | 28 | 18.10 | 60 | 18.50 | 38 | 111.05 |
| 23 | Jaroslav Bím | Czechoslovakia | 18.15 | 60 | 18.60 | 36 | 18.50 | 33 | 18.20 | 39 | 18.80 | 19 | 18.75 | 22 | 111.00 |
| 24 | Angelo Vicardi | Italy | 18.45 | 30 | 18.20 | 59 | 18.65 | 23 | 18.65 | 15 | 18.65 | 29 | 18.30 | 54 | 110.90 |
| 25 | Jack Beckner | United States | 18.35 | 35 | 18.25 | 55 | 18.70 | 18 | 18.10 | 46 | 18.70 | 26 | 18.75 | 22 | 110.85 |
| 26 | Günter Lyhs | United Team of Germany | 18.55 | 24 | 18.55 | 39 | 17.90 | 65 | 18.40 | 26 | 18.85 | 18 | 18.55 | 33 | 110.80 |
| 27 | Don Tonry | United States | 18.50 | 26 | 18.20 | 59 | 18.60 | 26 | 18.45 | 20 | 18.45 | 37 | 18.55 | 33 | 110.75 |
| 28 | Siegfried Fülle | United Team of Germany | 18.90 | 10 | 18.80 | 21 | 18.25 | 46 | 18.25 | 34 | 18.05 | 66 | 18.35 | 50 | 110.60 |
| 28 | Pavel Gajdoš | Czechoslovakia | 18.35 | 35 | 18.30 | 52 | 18.70 | 18 | 18.45 | 20 | 18.25 | 52 | 18.55 | 33 | 110.60 |
| 30 | Eugen Ekman | Finland | 18.10 | 62 | 18.15 | 66 | 19.25 | 2 | 17.55 | 89 | 18.65 | 29 | 18.75 | 22 | 110.45 |
| 31 | Pasquale Carminucci | Italy | 18.30 | 39 | 18.80 | 21 | 18.35 | 40 | 18.25 | 34 | 18.35 | 46 | 18.35 | 50 | 110.40 |
| 32 | Lajos Varga | Hungary | 18.20 | 52 | 18.75 | 25 | 18.05 | 57 | 18.25 | 34 | 18.70 | 26 | 18.40 | 46 | 110.35 |
| 33 | Josef Trmal | Czechoslovakia | 18.45 | 30 | 18.95 | 16 | 18.30 | 42 | 18.40 | 26 | 18.10 | 60 | 18.05 | 65 | 110.25 |
| 33 | Olavi Leimuvirta | Finland | 18.10 | 62 | 18.30 | 52 | 18.20 | 48 | 18.15 | 43 | 18.95 | 16 | 18.55 | 33 | 110.25 |
| 35 | Rajmund Csányi | Hungary | 18.20 | 52 | 18.70 | 30 | 18.00 | 59 | 18.25 | 34 | 18.15 | 56 | 18.80 | 20 | 110.10 |
| 36 | Abie Grossfeld | United States | 18.30 | 39 | 18.75 | 25 | 17.75 | 76 | 17.85 | 63 | 18.45 | 37 | 18.95 | 15 | 110.05 |
| 37 | Max Benker | Switzerland | 18.00 | 69 | 18.05 | 71 | 18.20 | 48 | 18.35 | 28 | 19.00 | 14 | 18.40 | 46 | 110.00 |
| 38 | Orlando Polmonari | Italy | 18.10 | 62 | 18.30 | 52 | 18.80 | 12 | 18.00 | 52 | 18.20 | 54 | 18.55 | 33 | 109.95 |
| 39 | Alojz Petrovič | Yugoslavia | 18.10 | 62 | 18.55 | 39 | 18.30 | 42 | 18.25 | 34 | 18.35 | 46 | 18.35 | 50 | 109.90 |
| 40 | Kauko Heikkinen | Finland | 18.45 | 30 | 17.90 | 79 | 19.00 | 8 | 17.65 | 81 | 18.45 | 37 | 18.40 | 46 | 109.85 |
| 40 | Fritz Feuz | Switzerland | 18.20 | 52 | 18.20 | 59 | 18.60 | 26 | 18.15 | 43 | 19.15 | 8 | 17.55 | 87 | 109.85 |
| 42 | Åge Storhaug | Norway | 18.45 | 30 | 18.20 | 59 | 18.75 | 15 | 17.55 | 89 | 18.45 | 37 | 18.20 | 59 | 109.60 |
| 42 | Raimo Heinonen | Finland | 17.95 | 71 | 18.10 | 69 | 18.25 | 46 | 17.80 | 68 | 18.75 | 23 | 18.75 | 22 | 109.60 |
| 44 | Fred Orlofsky | United States | 17.90 | 75 | 18.60 | 36 | 18.50 | 33 | 18.55 | 17 | 18.45 | 37 | 17.45 | 91 | 109.45 |
| 45 | Sakari Olkkonen | Finland | 17.90 | 75 | 18.65 | 34 | 18.45 | 36 | 18.05 | 51 | 18.40 | 42 | 17.95 | 72 | 109.40 |
| 46 | Andrzej Konopka | Poland | 18.50 | 26 | 18.45 | 43 | 17.95 | 62 | 17.45 | 93 | 18.35 | 46 | 18.50 | 38 | 109.20 |
| 47 | Hans Schwarzentruber | Switzerland | 18.25 | 46 | 18.45 | 43 | 18.00 | 59 | 18.10 | 46 | 18.60 | 31 | 17.75 | 81 | 109.15 |
| 47 | André Brüllmann | Switzerland | 17.95 | 71 | 18.00 | 73 | 18.10 | 54 | 17.75 | 69 | 18.90 | 17 | 18.45 | 42 | 109.15 |
| 49 | Rudolf Keszthelyi | Hungary | 18.60 | 22 | 18.45 | 43 | 17.85 | 69 | 18.00 | 52 | 18.20 | 54 | 18.00 | 70 | 109.10 |
| 50 | Erwin Koppe | United Team of Germany | 18.30 | 39 | 18.95 | 16 | 17.15 | 86 | 17.65 | 81 | 18.55 | 35 | 18.45 | 42 | 109.05 |
| 50 | Bernard Fauqueux | France | 18.25 | 46 | 18.35 | 49 | 17.90 | 65 | 18.00 | 52 | 18.15 | 56 | 18.40 | 46 | 109.05 |
| 50 | Gianfranco Marzolla | Italy | 18.05 | 66 | 18.70 | 30 | 18.75 | 15 | 18.20 | 39 | 17.45 | 92 | 17.90 | 76 | 109.05 |
| 53 | Gar O'Quinn | United States | 18.30 | 39 | 17.60 | 88 | 18.75 | 15 | 17.90 | 61 | 18.30 | 50 | 18.15 | 61 | 109.00 |
| 54 | Ladislav Pazdera | Czechoslovakia | 18.35 | 35 | 18.40 | 46 | 18.20 | 48 | 17.55 | 89 | 18.05 | 66 | 18.30 | 54 | 108.85 |
| 55 | Nik Stuart | Great Britain | 17.95 | 71 | 18.75 | 25 | 18.15 | 51 | 17.70 | 73 | 18.00 | 69 | 18.25 | 56 | 108.80 |
| 56 | Alfred Kucharczyk | Poland | 18.70 | 19 | 17.60 | 88 | 17.95 | 62 | 17.95 | 58 | 18.25 | 52 | 18.25 | 56 | 108.70 |
| 56 | Ivan Čaklec | Yugoslavia | 18.50 | 26 | 17.35 | 94 | 18.65 | 23 | 18.10 | 46 | 17.50 | 87 | 18.60 | 31 | 108.70 |
| 56 | Nikola Prodanov | Bulgaria | 18.35 | 35 | 18.15 | 66 | 17.50 | 80 | 18.55 | 17 | 17.80 | 78 | 18.35 | 50 | 108.70 |
| 59 | Günter Nachtigall | United Team of Germany | 18.30 | 39 | 18.55 | 39 | 18.35 | 40 | 18.30 | 33 | 17.40 | 96 | 17.75 | 81 | 108.65 |
| 60 | Ernest Hawełek | Poland | 18.05 | 66 | 18.25 | 55 | 17.95 | 62 | 18.00 | 52 | 17.80 | 78 | 18.50 | 38 | 108.55 |
| 61 | Jerzy Jokiel | Poland | 18.90 | 10 | 18.00 | 73 | 17.80 | 73 | 18.00 | 52 | 18.10 | 60 | 17.65 | 84 | 108.45 |
| 61 | Stig Lindewall | Sweden | 18.25 | 46 | 18.65 | 34 | 17.80 | 73 | 17.65 | 81 | 18.30 | 50 | 17.80 | 80 | 108.45 |
| 63 | Edy Thomi | Switzerland | 18.20 | 52 | 16.90 | 105 | 18.55 | 30 | 17.65 | 81 | 18.60 | 31 | 18.45 | 42 | 108.35 |
| 64 | Stoyan Stoyanov | Bulgaria | 17.75 | 79 | 18.75 | 25 | 15.85 | 104 | 18.35 | 28 | 18.80 | 19 | 18.70 | 26 | 108.20 |
| 65 | Lyuben Khristov | Bulgaria | 17.35 | 92 | 18.20 | 59 | 17.85 | 69 | 18.15 | 43 | 18.10 | 60 | 18.50 | 38 | 108.15 |
| 66 | Milenko Lekić | Yugoslavia | 18.20 | 52 | 18.05 | 71 | 17.85 | 69 | 17.90 | 61 | 17.95 | 70 | 18.10 | 64 | 108.05 |
| 67 | Karlheinz Friedrich | United Team of Germany | 18.00 | 69 | 18.35 | 49 | 17.00 | 91 | 18.20 | 39 | 17.85 | 74 | 18.60 | 31 | 108.00 |
| 68 | Mohamed Lazhari | France | 18.25 | 46 | 17.45 | 92 | 18.10 | 54 | 17.15 | 101 | 18.10 | 60 | 18.65 | 28 | 107.70 |
| 69 | Todor Bachvarov | Bulgaria | 17.75 | 79 | 18.35 | 49 | 18.00 | 59 | 16.90 | 106 | 18.40 | 42 | 18.20 | 59 | 107.60 |
| 70 | Armand Huberty | Luxembourg | 17.55 | 86 | 18.10 | 69 | 17.30 | 83 | 17.85 | 63 | 17.90 | 72 | 18.85 | 17 | 107.55 |
| 71 | Marsel Markulin | Yugoslavia | 18.40 | 34 | 18.20 | 59 | 17.25 | 85 | 17.85 | 63 | 17.80 | 78 | 17.95 | 72 | 107.45 |
| 72 | Józef Rajnisz | Poland | 17.35 | 92 | 18.70 | 30 | 18.50 | 33 | 17.70 | 73 | 17.05 | 99 | 18.05 | 65 | 107.35 |
| 73 | Kurt Wigartz | Sweden | 18.20 | 52 | 17.45 | 92 | 18.45 | 36 | 17.70 | 73 | 17.50 | 87 | 17.75 | 81 | 107.05 |
| 74 | Aleksander Rokosa | Poland | 18.20 | 52 | 18.60 | 36 | 17.50 | 80 | 16.55 | 112 | 18.55 | 35 | 17.40 | 93 | 106.80 |
| 75 | János Mester | Hungary | 18.05 | 66 | 17.10 | 102 | 18.40 | 38 | 17.65 | 81 | 17.50 | 87 | 18.05 | 65 | 106.75 |
| 76 | Philipp Fürst | United Team of Germany | 18.60 | 22 | 18.95 | 16 | 17.90 | 65 | 18.20 | 39 | 19.15 | 8 | 13.85 | 119 | 106.65 |
| 77 | Georgi Khristov | Bulgaria | 17.80 | 77 | 18.75 | 25 | 16.00 | 103 | 18.00 | 52 | 17.85 | 74 | 17.85 | 78 | 106.25 |
| 77 | Robert Caymaris | France | 18.15 | 60 | 17.30 | 95 | 17.35 | 82 | 17.85 | 63 | 17.70 | 82 | 17.90 | 76 | 106.25 |
| 79 | Hans Sauter | Austria | 17.00 | 99 | 17.90 | 79 | 17.90 | 65 | 17.70 | 73 | 17.65 | 83 | 17.95 | 72 | 106.10 |
| 80 | Géza Bejek | Hungary | 17.65 | 81 | 17.60 | 88 | 17.85 | 69 | 17.75 | 69 | 17.85 | 74 | 17.00 | 99 | 105.70 |
| 81 | Jean Jaillard | France | 17.25 | 96 | 16.65 | 113 | 18.40 | 38 | 17.70 | 73 | 17.50 | 87 | 18.15 | 61 | 105.65 |
| 82 | Bo Wirhed | Sweden | 17.45 | 89 | 17.95 | 77 | 18.10 | 54 | 18.45 | 20 | 16.45 | 106 | 17.20 | 98 | 105.60 |
| 83 | Michel Mathiot | France | 17.50 | 88 | 16.55 | 115 | 17.70 | 77 | 16.75 | 110 | 18.15 | 56 | 18.65 | 28 | 105.30 |
| 84 | Sándor Békési | Hungary | 18.30 | 39 | 17.50 | 91 | 17.60 | 78 | 18.35 | 28 | 18.05 | 66 | 15.45 | 112 | 105.25 |
| 85 | Richard Montpetit | Canada | 17.65 | 81 | 17.25 | 98 | 17.15 | 86 | 17.70 | 73 | 18.10 | 60 | 17.35 | 96 | 105.20 |
| 86 | Ismail Abdallah | United Arab Republic | 16.75 | 104 | 18.20 | 59 | 15.40 | 108 | 17.95 | 58 | 18.60 | 31 | 18.00 | 70 | 104.90 |
| 87 | Dragan Gagić | Yugoslavia | 18.20 | 52 | 17.90 | 79 | 18.70 | 18 | 17.20 | 100 | 16.05 | 110 | 16.65 | 103 | 104.70 |
| 88 | Kim Sang-guk | South Korea | 17.80 | 77 | 18.40 | 46 | 15.20 | 109 | 17.65 | 81 | 17.95 | 70 | 17.55 | 87 | 104.55 |
| 89 | Ahmed Goneim | United Arab Republic | 16.70 | 108 | 17.80 | 85 | 17.10 | 89 | 17.85 | 63 | 17.50 | 87 | 17.55 | 87 | 104.50 |
| 90 | Johann König | Austria | 17.10 | 98 | 17.20 | 100 | 17.30 | 83 | 17.45 | 93 | 17.05 | 99 | 18.25 | 56 | 104.35 |
| 91 | Leif Koorn | Sweden | 17.65 | 81 | 18.85 | 20 | 18.05 | 57 | 17.75 | 69 | 15.50 | 113 | 16.50 | 104 | 104.30 |
| 92 | William Thoresson | Sweden | 18.65 | 21 | 16.80 | 107 | 17.10 | 89 | 18.50 | 19 | 16.70 | 104 | 15.90 | 109 | 103.65 |
| 93 | Daniel Touche | France | 17.95 | 71 | 17.85 | 83 | 16.75 | 92 | 15.10 | 122 | 17.90 | 72 | 18.05 | 65 | 103.60 |
| 94 | Hermann Klien | Austria | 16.85 | 102 | 16.80 | 107 | 17.60 | 78 | 16.90 | 106 | 17.85 | 74 | 17.50 | 90 | 103.50 |
| 95 | Jaime Belenguer | Spain | 16.70 | 108 | 17.30 | 95 | 17.80 | 73 | 16.45 | 114 | 18.15 | 56 | 16.90 | 100 | 103.30 |
| 96 | Ahmed Dakkeli | United Arab Republic | 17.25 | 96 | 18.25 | 55 | 15.05 | 110 | 16.85 | 108 | 17.60 | 85 | 18.15 | 61 | 103.15 |
| 97 | Michel Kiesgen | Luxembourg | 15.80 | 122 | 18.15 | 66 | 16.50 | 97 | 16.65 | 111 | 17.00 | 101 | 17.85 | 78 | 101.95 |
| 98 | Emilio Lecuona | Spain | 16.35 | 114 | 18.25 | 55 | 16.55 | 96 | 17.40 | 95 | 16.10 | 107 | 17.25 | 97 | 101.90 |
| 99 | Dick Gradley | Great Britain | 17.60 | 85 | 17.85 | 83 | 16.35 | 100 | 15.05 | 123 | 17.45 | 92 | 17.45 | 91 | 101.75 |
| 100 | Marcel Coppin | Luxembourg | 16.90 | 101 | 16.70 | 111 | 15.50 | 107 | 17.60 | 87 | 17.25 | 98 | 17.60 | 86 | 101.55 |
| 101 | Abdel Vares Sharraf | United Arab Republic | 16.50 | 113 | 18.70 | 30 | 16.65 | 95 | 17.40 | 95 | 15.95 | 111 | 16.30 | 106 | 101.50 |
| 102 | Jack Pancott | Great Britain | 17.65 | 81 | 17.30 | 95 | 16.40 | 99 | 17.35 | 98 | 17.45 | 92 | 15.00 | 116 | 101.15 |
| 103 | Ramón García | Spain | 16.75 | 104 | 17.80 | 85 | 16.10 | 102 | 16.40 | 115 | 16.95 | 102 | 16.70 | 102 | 100.70 |
| 104 | Willi Kafel | Austria | 17.55 | 86 | 16.70 | 111 | 16.75 | 92 | 17.75 | 69 | 14.45 | 120 | 17.40 | 93 | 100.60 |
| 105 | Jean Cronstedt | Sweden | 17.30 | 95 | 17.65 | 87 | 16.50 | 97 | 15.05 | 123 | 16.10 | 107 | 17.65 | 84 | 100.25 |
| 106 | Enrique Montserrat | Spain | 15.45 | 124 | 17.90 | 79 | 15.80 | 105 | 17.70 | 73 | 17.45 | 92 | 15.25 | 113 | 99.55 |
| 107 | Luis Valbuena | Spain | 17.45 | 89 | 18.00 | 73 | 17.15 | 86 | 17.70 | 73 | 17.55 | 86 | 11.05 | 122 | 98.90 |
| 108 | René Marteaux | Belgium | 16.25 | 117 | 17.25 | 98 | 15.05 | 110 | 17.60 | 87 | 17.65 | 83 | 15.05 | 115 | 98.85 |
| 109 | Selim El-Sayed | United Arab Republic | 16.70 | 108 | 16.15 | 117 | 14.35 | 116 | 17.55 | 89 | 17.75 | 81 | 16.25 | 107 | 98.75 |
| 110 | Ahmed Issam Allam | United Arab Republic | 16.80 | 103 | 16.75 | 110 | 12.70 | 120 | 16.30 | 117 | 18.75 | 23 | 17.40 | 93 | 98.70 |
| 111 | Gerhard Huber | Austria | 16.30 | 116 | 17.15 | 101 | 16.35 | 100 | 17.10 | 102 | 16.10 | 107 | 15.65 | 110 | 98.65 |
| 112 | John Mulhall | Great Britain | 16.35 | 114 | 16.65 | 113 | 14.70 | 113 | 17.05 | 104 | 16.95 | 102 | 15.95 | 108 | 97.65 |
| 113 | Benjamin de Roo | Australia | 16.75 | 104 | 16.85 | 106 | 14.15 | 117 | 16.35 | 116 | 16.50 | 105 | 15.65 | 110 | 96.25 |
| 114 | Ken Buffin | Great Britain | 15.05 | 125 | 15.75 | 118 | 14.40 | 115 | 17.35 | 98 | 15.15 | 118 | 17.95 | 72 | 95.65 |
| 115 | Graham Bond | Australia | 16.20 | 118 | 17.10 | 102 | 14.00 | 118 | 14.65 | 125 | 15.45 | 115 | 18.05 | 65 | 95.45 |
| 116 | Juan Caviglia | Argentina | 17.35 | 92 | 15.40 | 119 | 14.50 | 114 | 16.30 | 117 | 14.10 | 122 | 16.50 | 104 | 94.15 |
| 117 | Léopold Desmet | Belgium | 16.55 | 111 | 16.95 | 104 | 12.40 | 121 | 17.40 | 95 | 15.85 | 112 | 14.15 | 118 | 93.30 |
| 118 | Armando Valles | Mexico | 16.10 | 120 | 16.80 | 107 | 16.75 | 92 | 15.55 | 121 | 15.05 | 119 | 11.80 | 121 | 92.05 |
| 119 | Hubert Erang | Luxembourg | 16.75 | 104 | 14.75 | 121 | 14.85 | 112 | 17.10 | 102 | 15.30 | 116 | 13.10 | 120 | 91.85 |
| 120 | Hermenegildo Candeias | Portugal | 16.55 | 111 | 16.20 | 116 | 15.65 | 106 | 8.75 | 129 | 15.30 | 116 | 15.20 | 114 | 87.65 |
| 121 | François Eisenbarth | Luxembourg | 13.95 | 127 | 15.25 | 120 | 12.75 | 119 | 16.20 | 119 | 14.20 | 121 | 14.75 | 117 | 87.10 |
| 122 | Anton Hertl | Austria | 17.00 | 99 | 7.50 | 128 | 6.70 | 128 | 16.50 | 113 | 15.50 | 113 | 16.75 | 101 | 79.95 |
| 123 | Mohamed Sekkat | Morocco | 16.15 | 119 | 13.35 | 122 | 10.35 | 122 | 14.45 | 126 | 14.10 | 122 | 10.45 | 124 | 78.85 |
| 124 | Ahmed Fellat | Morocco | 15.60 | 123 | 8.75 | 125 | 9.50 | 123 | 15.65 | 120 | 10.40 | 124 | 10.80 | 123 | 70.70 |
| 125 | Miloud M'Sellek | Morocco | 12.15 | 128 | 12.20 | 123 | 7.00 | 127 | 16.80 | 109 | 9.50 | 126 | 7.35 | 127 | 65.00 |
| 126 | Abdesselem Regragui | Morocco | 14.10 | 126 | 7.50 | 128 | 8.75 | 125 | 12.75 | 127 | 10.25 | 125 | 9.15 | 125 | 62.50 |
| 127 | Darif Tanjaoui | Morocco | 15.95 | 121 | 8.20 | 127 | 9.05 | 124 | 11.50 | 128 | 9.25 | 127 | 6.00 | 129 | 59.95 |
| 128 | Peter Starling | Great Britain | 7.95 | 129 | 8.50 | 126 | 8.65 | 126 | 17.00 | 105 | 7.95 | 128 | 7.65 | 126 | 57.70 |
| 129 | Hermenegildo Martínez | Spain | 17.40 | 91 | 9.35 | 124 | — | — | 18.10 | 46 | — | — | 6.40 | 128 | 51.25 |
| 130 | Kacem Klifa | Morocco | — | — | — | — | — | — | — | — | 2.50 | 129 | 4.00 | 130 | 6.50 |
