= Gymnastics at the 1960 Summer Olympics – Men's floor =

Men's floor exercise at the Games of the XVII Olympiad
- Venue: Baths of Caracalla
- Date: 5–10 September 1960
- Competitors: 129 from 27 nations
- Winning score: 19.450

Medalists
1st place, gold medalist(s)		Nobuyuki Aihara	Japan
2nd place, silver medalist(s)		Yuri Titov	Soviet Union
3rd place, bronze medalist(s)		Franco Menichelli	Italy

These are the results of the men's floor competition, one of eight events for male competitors in artistic gymnastics at the 1960 Summer Olympics in Rome.

== Competition format ==
The gymnastics all-around events continued to use the aggregation format. Each nation entered a team of six gymnasts or up to two individual gymnasts. All entrants in the gymnastics competitions performed both a compulsory exercise and a voluntary exercise for each apparatus. The scores for all 12 exercises were summed to give an individual all-around score.

These exercise scores were also used for qualification for the new apparatus finals. The two exercises (compulsory and voluntary) for each apparatus were summed to give an apparatus score; the top 6 in each apparatus participated in the finals; others were ranked 7th through 130th. For the apparatus finals, the all-around score for that apparatus was multiplied by one-half then added to the final round exercise score to give a final total.

Exercise scores ranged from 0 to 10, with the final total apparatus score from 0 to 20.

== Results ==
Rank	Gymnast	Nation	Preliminary			Final		
Rank	Gymnast	Nation	Compulsory	Voluntary	Total	1/2 Prelim.	Final	Total
1st place, gold medalist(s)	Nobuyuki Aihara	Japan	9.50	9.80	19.30	9.650	9.800	19.450
2nd place, silver medalist(s)	Yury Titov	Soviet Union	9.50	9.75	19.25	9.625	9.700	19.325
3rd place, bronze medalist(s)	Franco Menichelli	Italy	9.50	9.55	19.05	9.525	9.750	19.275
4	Takashi Mitsukuri	Japan	9.40	9.60	19.00	9.500	9.700	19.200
4	Takashi Ono	Japan	9.35	9.65	19.00	9.500	9.700	19.200
6	Jaroslav Šťastný	Czechoslovakia	9.45	9.55	19.00	9.500	9.550	19.050
7	Vladimir Portnoy	Soviet Union	9.45	9.50	18.95	did not advance		
7	Boris Shakhlin	Soviet Union	9.35	9.60	18.95	did not advance		
7	Ernst Fivian	Switzerland	9.40	9.55	18.95	did not advance		
10	Yukio Endo	Japan	9.40	9.50	18.90	did not advance		
10	Siegfried Fülle	United Team of Germany	9.40	9.50	18.90	did not advance		
10	Jerzy Jokiel	Poland	9.40	9.50	18.90	did not advance		
13	Shuji Tsurumi	Japan	9.45	9.40	18.85	did not advance		
14	Masao Takemoto	Japan	9.30	9.50	18.80	did not advance		
14	Nikolai Miligulo	Soviet Union	9.35	9.45	18.80	did not advance		
14	Valery Kerdemelidi	Soviet Union	9.30	9.50	18.80	did not advance		
17	Miroslav Cerar	Yugoslavia	9.40	9.35	18.75	did not advance		
17	Otto Kestola	Finland	9.35	9.40	18.75	did not advance		
19	Ferdinand Daniš	Czechoslovakia	9.40	9.30	18.70	did not advance		
19	Alfred Kucharczyk	Poland	9.30	9.40	18.70	did not advance		
21	William Thoresson	Sweden	9.35	9.30	18.65	did not advance		
22	Philipp Fürst	United Team of Germany	9.20	9.40	18.60	did not advance		
22	Rudolf Keszthelyi	Hungary	9.30	9.30	18.60	did not advance		
24	Albert Azaryan	Soviet Union	9.20	9.35	18.55	did not advance		
24	Günter Lyhs	United Team of Germany	9.15	9.40	18.55	did not advance		
26	Giovanni Carminucci	Italy	9.25	9.25	18.50	did not advance		
26	Don Tonry	United States	9.10	9.40	18.50	did not advance		
26	Ivan Čaklec	Yugoslavia	9.20	9.30	18.50	did not advance		
26	Andrzej Konopka	Poland	9.20	9.30	18.50	did not advance		
30	Angelo Vicardi	Italy	9.15	9.30	18.45	did not advance		
30	Josef Trmal	Czechoslovakia	9.30	9.15	18.45	did not advance		
30	Kauko Heikkinen	Finland	9.30	9.15	18.45	did not advance		
30	Åge Storhaug	Norway	9.20	9.25	18.45	did not advance		
34	Marsel Markulin	Yugoslavia	9.20	9.20	18.40	did not advance		
35	Nikola Prodanov	Bulgaria	9.00	9.35	18.35	did not advance		
35	Pavel Gajdoš	Czechoslovakia	9.15	9.20	18.35	did not advance		
35	Jack Beckner	United States	9.20	9.15	18.35	did not advance		
35	Ladislav Pazdera	Czechoslovakia	9.05	9.30	18.35	did not advance		
39	Larry Banner	United States	9.10	9.20	18.30	did not advance		
39	Sándor Békési	Hungary	9.10	9.20	18.30	did not advance		
39	Günter Nachtigall	United Team of Germany	9.05	9.25	18.30	did not advance		
39	Pasquale Carminucci	Italy	9.05	9.25	18.30	did not advance		
39	Gar O'Quinn	United States	9.15	9.15	18.30	did not advance		
39	Abie Grossfeld	United States	8.85	9.45	18.30	did not advance		
39	Erwin Koppe	United Team of Germany	8.95	9.35	18.30	did not advance		
46	Josy Stoffel	Luxembourg	9.10	9.15	18.25	did not advance		
46	Hans Schwarzentruber	Switzerland	9.00	9.25	18.25	did not advance		
46	Bernard Fauqueux	France	9.00	9.25	18.25	did not advance		
46	Velik Kapsazov	Bulgaria	8.85	9.40	18.25	did not advance		
46	Stig Lindewall	Sweden	9.05	9.20	18.25	did not advance		
46	Mohamed Lazhari	France	9.05	9.20	18.25	did not advance		
52	Lajos Varga	Hungary	9.10	9.10	18.20	did not advance		
52	Rajmund Csányi	Hungary	9.15	9.05	18.20	did not advance		
52	Fritz Feuz	Switzerland	9.00	9.20	18.20	did not advance		
52	Milenko Lekić	Yugoslavia	9.10	9.10	18.20	did not advance		
52	Kurt Wigartz	Sweden	9.15	9.05	18.20	did not advance		
52	Edy Thomi	Switzerland	9.05	9.15	18.20	did not advance		
52	Dragan Gagić	Yugoslavia	8.90	9.30	18.20	did not advance		
52	Aleksander Rokosa	Poland	9.00	9.20	18.20	did not advance		
60	Jaroslav Bím	Czechoslovakia	8.95	9.20	18.15	did not advance		
60	Robert Caymaris	France	8.80	9.35	18.15	did not advance		
62	Alojz Petrovič	Yugoslavia	8.95	9.15	18.10	did not advance		
62	Olavi Leimuvirta	Finland	9.15	8.95	18.10	did not advance		
62	Orlando Polmonari	Italy	8.90	9.20	18.10	did not advance		
62	Eugen Ekman	Finland	8.95	9.15	18.10	did not advance		
66	Gianfranco Marzolla	Italy	8.60	9.45	18.05	did not advance		
66	Ernest Hawełek	Poland	9.00	9.05	18.05	did not advance		
66	János Mester	Hungary	8.90	9.15	18.05	did not advance		
69	Max Benker	Switzerland	8.95	9.05	18.00	did not advance		
69	Karlheinz Friedrich	United Team of Germany	8.85	9.15	18.00	did not advance		
71	Raimo Heinonen	Finland	9.05	8.90	17.95	did not advance		
71	André Brüllmann	Switzerland	8.90	9.05	17.95	did not advance		
71	Nik Stuart	Great Britain	9.10	8.85	17.95	did not advance		
71	Daniel Touche	France	8.80	9.15	17.95	did not advance		
75	Fred Orlofsky	United States	8.90	9.00	17.90	did not advance		
75	Sakari Olkkonen	Finland	8.80	9.10	17.90	did not advance		
77	Georgi Khristov	Bulgaria	8.60	9.20	17.80	did not advance		
77	Kim Sang-guk	South Korea	8.90	8.90	17.80	did not advance		
79	Stoyan Stoyanov	Bulgaria	8.70	9.05	17.75	did not advance		
79	Todor Bachvarov	Bulgaria	8.60	9.15	17.75	did not advance		
81	Géza Bejek	Hungary	8.60	9.05	17.65	did not advance		
81	Leif Koorn	Sweden	8.80	8.85	17.65	did not advance		
81	Richard Montpetit	Canada	8.85	8.80	17.65	did not advance		
81	Jack Pancott	Great Britain	8.85	8.80	17.65	did not advance		
85	Dick Gradley	Great Britain	8.50	9.10	17.60	did not advance		
86	Armand Huberty	Luxembourg	8.60	8.95	17.55	did not advance		
86	Willi Kafel	Austria	8.45	9.10	17.55	did not advance		
88	Michel Mathiot	France	8.40	9.10	17.50	did not advance		
89	Bo Wirhed	Sweden	8.75	8.70	17.45	did not advance		
89	Luis Valbuena	Spain	8.50	8.95	17.45	did not advance		
91	Hermenegildo Martínez	Spain	8.40	9.00	17.40	did not advance		
92	Lyuben Khristov	Bulgaria	8.40	8.95	17.35	did not advance		
92	Józef Rajnisz	Poland	8.35	9.00	17.35	did not advance		
92	Juan Caviglia	Argentina	8.35	9.00	17.35	did not advance		
95	Jean Cronstedt	Sweden	8.70	8.60	17.30	did not advance		
96	Jean Jaillard	France	8.25	9.00	17.25	did not advance		
96	Ahmed Dakkeli	United Arab Republic	8.35	8.90	17.25	did not advance		
98	Johann König	Austria	8.20	8.90	17.10	did not advance		
99	Hans Sauter	Austria	8.30	8.70	17.00	did not advance		
99	Anton Hertl	Austria	8.30	8.70	17.00	did not advance		
101	Marcel Coppin	Luxembourg	8.40	8.50	16.90	did not advance		
102	Hermann Klien	Austria	8.25	8.60	16.85	did not advance		
103	Ahmed Issam Allam	United Arab Republic	8.10	8.70	16.80	did not advance		
104	Ismail Abdallah	United Arab Republic	8.15	8.60	16.75	did not advance		
104	Hubert Erang	Luxembourg	8.05	8.70	16.75	did not advance		
104	Ramón García	Spain	8.00	8.75	16.75	did not advance		
104	Benjamin de Roo	Australia	7.95	8.80	16.75	did not advance		
108	Ahmed Goneim	United Arab Republic	8.00	8.70	16.70	did not advance		
108	Selim El-Sayed	United Arab Republic	8.25	8.45	16.70	did not advance		
108	Jaime Belenguer	Spain	7.90	8.80	16.70	did not advance		
111	Léopold Desmet	Belgium	8.00	8.55	16.55	did not advance		
111	Hermenegildo Candeias	Portugal	8.30	8.25	16.55	did not advance		
113	Abdel Vares Sharraf	United Arab Republic	8.30	8.20	16.50	did not advance		
114	Emilio Lecuona	Spain	8.00	8.35	16.35	did not advance		
114	John Mulhall	Great Britain	8.10	8.25	16.35	did not advance		
116	Gerhard Huber	Austria	8.00	8.30	16.30	did not advance		
117	René Marteaux	Belgium	7.75	8.50	16.25	did not advance		
118	Graham Bond	Australia	7.80	8.40	16.20	did not advance		
119	Mohamed Sekkat	Morocco	7.70	8.45	16.15	did not advance		
120	Armando Valles	Mexico	7.90	8.20	16.10	did not advance		
121	Darif Tanjaoui	Morocco	7.55	8.40	15.95	did not advance		
122	Michel Kiesgen	Luxembourg	8.05	7.75	15.80	did not advance		
123	Ahmed Fellat	Morocco	7.65	7.95	15.60	did not advance		
124	Enrique Montserrat	Spain	7.25	8.20	15.45	did not advance		
125	Ken Buffin	Great Britain	7.55	7.50	15.05	did not advance		
126	Abdesselem Regragui	Morocco	6.70	7.40	14.10	did not advance		
127	François Eisenbarth	Luxembourg	6.85	7.10	13.95	did not advance		
128	Miloud M'Sellek	Morocco	6.65	5.50	12.15	did not advance		
129	Peter Starling	Great Britain	7.95	—	7.95	did not advance		
