= Gymnastics at the 1960 Summer Olympics – Men's parallel bars =

Olympic gymnastics event

Men's parallel bars at the Games of the XVII Olympiad
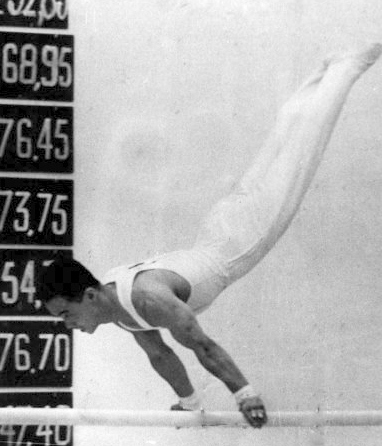
- Noboyuki Aihara competing on the parallel bars
- Venue: Baths of Caracalla
- Dates: 5–10 September 1960
- Competitors: 129 from 27 nations
- Winning score: 19.400

Medalists
1st place, gold medalist(s)		Boris Shakhlin; Soviet Union
2nd place, silver medalist(s)		Giovanni Carminucci; Italy
3rd place, bronze medalist(s)		Takashi Ono; Japan

The men's parallel bars competition was one of eight events for male competitors in artistic gymnastics at the 1960 Summer Olympics in Rome. It was held on 5, 7, and 10 September at the Baths of Caracalla. There were 129 competitors from 28 nations, with nations in the team competition having up to 6 gymnasts and other nations entering up to 2 gymnasts. The event was won by Boris Shakhlin of the Soviet Union, the nation's second consecutive victory in the men's parallel bars (tying Germany for second-most all-time). Giovanni Carminucci earned Italy's first medal in the event since 1932 with his silver. Takashi Ono of Japan took bronze for a second consecutive Games, making him the fourth man to win multiple medals in the event.

The 1960 gymnastics competitions introduced apparatus finals, with the all-around competition serving as a qualifying round for the parallel bars final.

== Background ==
This was the 10th appearance of the event, which is one of the five apparatus events held every time there were apparatus events at the Summer Olympics (no apparatus events were held in 1900, 1908, 1912, or 1920). Seven of the top 12 (including ties for 8th) gymnasts from 1956 returned: bronze medalists Takashi Ono and Masao Takemoto of Japan, fifth-place finisher Albert Azaryan of the Soviet Union, sixth-place finisher Nobuyuki Aihara of Japan, and eighth-place finishers Yury Titov and Boris Shakhlin of the Soviet Union and Olavi Leimuvirta of Finland. Shakhlin had won the 1958 world championship, with Ono the runner-up.

Morocco and South Korea each made their debut in the men's parallel bars; the short-lived United Arab Republic made its only appearance. The United States made its ninth appearance, most of any nation, having missed only the inaugural 1896 Games.

== Competition format ==
The gymnastics all-around events continued to use the aggregation format. Each nation entered a team of six gymnasts or up to two individual gymnasts. All entrants in the gymnastics competitions performed both a compulsory exercise and a voluntary exercise for each apparatus. The scores for all 12 exercises were summed to give an individual all-around score.

These exercise scores were also used for qualification for the new apparatus finals. The two exercises (compulsory and voluntary) for each apparatus were summed to give an apparatus score; the top 6 in each apparatus participated in the finals; others were ranked 7th through 129th. For the apparatus finals, the all-around score for that apparatus was multiplied by one-half then added to the final round exercise score to give a final total.

Exercise scores ranged from 0 to 10, with the final total apparatus score from 0 to 20.

== Schedule ==
All times are Central European Time (UTC+1)

Date	Time	Round
Monday, 5 September 1960	8:00; 17:00	Preliminary: Compulsory
Wednesday, 7 September 1960	8:00; 17:00	Preliminary: Voluntary
Saturday, 10 September 1960	15:00	Final

== Results ==
Rank	Gymnast	Nation	Preliminary			Final		
Rank	Gymnast	Nation	Compulsory	Voluntary	Total	1/2 Prelim.	Final	Total
1st place, gold medalist(s)	Boris Shakhlin	Soviet Union	9.70	9.70	19.40	9.700	9.700	19.400
2nd place, silver medalist(s)	Giovanni Carminucci	Italy	9.60	9.75	19.35	9.675	9.700	19.375
3rd place, bronze medalist(s)	Takashi Ono	Japan	9.80	9.60	19.40	9.700	9.650	19.350
4	Nobuyuki Aihara	Japan	9.60	9.65	19.25	9.625	9.650	19.275
5	Yury Titov	Soviet Union	9.65	9.55	19.20	9.600	9.600	19.200
6	Masao Takemoto	Japan	9.70	9.55	19.25	9.625	9.500	19.125
7	Yukio Endo	Japan	9.70	9.50	19.20	did not advance		
8	Franco Menichelli	Italy	9.55	9.60	19.15	did not advance		
8	Shuji Tsurumi	Japan	9.55	9.60	19.15	did not advance		
8	Miroslav Cerar	Yugoslavia	9.45	9.70	19.15	did not advance		
8	Philipp Fürst	United Team of Germany	9.60	9.55	19.15	did not advance		
8	Fritz Feuz	Switzerland	9.60	9.55	19.15	did not advance		
13	Ernst Fivian	Switzerland	9.45	9.60	19.05	did not advance		
14	Otto Kestola	Finland	9.55	9.45	19.00	did not advance		
14	Max Benker	Switzerland	9.50	9.50	19.00	did not advance		
16	Olavi Leimuvirta	Finland	9.40	9.55	18.95	did not advance		
17	André Brüllmann	Switzerland	9.45	9.45	18.90	did not advance		
18	Günter Lyhs	United Team of Germany	9.35	9.50	18.85	did not advance		
19	Takashi Mitsukuri	Japan	9.65	9.15	18.80	did not advance		
19	Ferdinand Daniš	Czechoslovakia	9.35	9.45	18.80	did not advance		
19	Stoyan Stoyanov	Bulgaria	9.40	9.40	18.80	did not advance		
19	Jaroslav Bím	Czechoslovakia	9.45	9.35	18.80	did not advance		
23	Nikolai Miligulo	Soviet Union	9.45	9.30	18.75	did not advance		
23	Raimo Heinonen	Finland	9.25	9.50	18.75	did not advance		
23	Ahmed Issam Allam	United Arab Republic	9.40	9.35	18.75	did not advance		
26	Lajos Varga	Hungary	9.35	9.35	18.70	did not advance		
26	Josy Stoffel	Luxembourg	9.40	9.30	18.70	did not advance		
26	Jack Beckner	United States	9.45	9.25	18.70	did not advance		
29	Angelo Vicardi	Italy	9.10	9.55	18.65	did not advance		
29	Eugen Ekman	Finland	9.25	9.40	18.65	did not advance		
31	Velik Kapsazov	Bulgaria	9.30	9.30	18.60	did not advance		
31	Hans Schwarzentruber	Switzerland	9.25	9.35	18.60	did not advance		
31	Ismail Abdallah	United Arab Republic	9.30	9.30	18.60	did not advance		
31	Edy Thomi	Switzerland	9.20	9.40	18.60	did not advance		
35	Erwin Koppe	United Team of Germany	9.20	9.35	18.55	did not advance		
35	Aleksander Rokosa	Poland	9.20	9.35	18.55	did not advance		
37	Abie Grossfeld	United States	9.25	9.20	18.45	did not advance		
37	Fred Orlofsky	United States	9.30	9.15	18.45	did not advance		
37	Åge Storhaug	Norway	9.05	9.40	18.45	did not advance		
37	Don Tonry	United States	9.30	9.15	18.45	did not advance		
37	Kauko Heikkinen	Finland	9.15	9.30	18.45	did not advance		
42	Vladimir Portnoy	Soviet Union	9.40	9.00	18.40	did not advance		
42	Sakari Olkkonen	Finland	8.90	9.50	18.40	did not advance		
42	Todor Bachvarov	Bulgaria	9.05	9.35	18.40	did not advance		
42	Jaroslav Šťastný	Czechoslovakia	9.35	9.05	18.40	did not advance		
46	Albert Azaryan	Soviet Union	9.25	9.10	18.35	did not advance		
46	Pasquale Carminucci	Italy	9.15	9.20	18.35	did not advance		
46	Alojz Petrovič	Yugoslavia	9.20	9.15	18.35	did not advance		
46	Andrzej Konopka	Poland	9.10	9.25	18.35	did not advance		
50	Stig Lindewall	Sweden	9.05	9.25	18.30	did not advance		
50	Gar O'Quinn	United States	9.15	9.15	18.30	did not advance		
52	Pavel Gajdoš	Czechoslovakia	9.25	9.00	18.25	did not advance		
52	Alfred Kucharczyk	Poland	8.95	9.30	18.25	did not advance		
54	Rudolf Keszthelyi	Hungary	9.30	8.90	18.20	did not advance		
54	Orlando Polmonari	Italy	9.00	9.20	18.20	did not advance		
56	Rajmund Csányi	Hungary	9.45	8.70	18.15	did not advance		
56	Bernard Fauqueux	France	9.15	9.00	18.15	did not advance		
56	Jaime Belenguer	Spain	9.30	8.85	18.15	did not advance		
56	Michel Mathiot	France	8.95	9.20	18.15	did not advance		
60	Josef Trmal	Czechoslovakia	9.00	9.10	18.10	did not advance		
60	Larry Banner	United States	9.10	9.00	18.10	did not advance		
60	Lyuben Khristov	Bulgaria	9.20	8.90	18.10	did not advance		
60	Jerzy Jokiel	Poland	9.10	9.00	18.10	did not advance		
60	Mohamed Lazhari	France	9.40	8.70	18.10	did not advance		
60	Richard Montpetit	Canada	9.05	9.05	18.10	did not advance		
66	Siegfried Fülle	United Team of Germany	9.00	9.05	18.05	did not advance		
66	Ladislav Pazdera	Czechoslovakia	9.25	8.80	18.05	did not advance		
66	Sándor Békési	Hungary	8.95	9.10	18.05	did not advance		
69	Nik Stuart	Great Britain	9.10	8.90	18.00	did not advance		
70	Kim Sang-guk	South Korea	8.95	9.00	17.95	did not advance		
70	Milenko Lekić	Yugoslavia	9.00	8.95	17.95	did not advance		
72	Armand Huberty	Luxembourg	8.85	9.05	17.90	did not advance		
72	Daniel Touche	France	8.90	9.00	17.90	did not advance		
74	Georgi Khristov	Bulgaria	8.85	9.00	17.85	did not advance		
74	Karlheinz Friedrich	United Team of Germany	8.85	9.00	17.85	did not advance		
74	Géza Bejek	Hungary	8.95	8.90	17.85	did not advance		
74	Hermann Klien	Austria	8.90	8.95	17.85	did not advance		
78	Ernest Hawełek	Poland	8.80	9.00	17.80	did not advance		
78	Marsel Markulin	Yugoslavia	8.80	9.00	17.80	did not advance		
78	Nikola Prodanov	Bulgaria	8.65	9.15	17.80	did not advance		
81	Selim El-Sayed	United Arab Republic	8.75	9.00	17.75	did not advance		
82	Robert Caymaris	France	9.35	8.35	17.70	did not advance		
83	Hans Sauter	Austria	8.85	8.80	17.65	did not advance		
83	René Marteaux	Belgium	8.75	8.90	17.65	did not advance		
85	Ahmed Dakkeli	United Arab Republic	8.75	8.85	17.60	did not advance		
86	Luis Valbuena	Spain	8.40	9.15	17.55	did not advance		
87	Ahmed Goneim	United Arab Republic	8.05	9.45	17.50	did not advance		
87	Kurt Wigartz	Sweden	8.50	9.00	17.50	did not advance		
87	Ivan Čaklec	Yugoslavia	8.75	8.75	17.50	did not advance		
87	János Mester	Hungary	8.75	8.75	17.50	did not advance		
87	Jean Jaillard	France	9.00	8.50	17.50	did not advance		
92	Gianfranco Marzolla	Italy	8.20	9.25	17.45	did not advance		
92	Enrique Montserrat	Spain	8.35	9.10	17.45	did not advance		
92	Dick Gradley	Great Britain	8.70	8.75	17.45	did not advance		
92	Jack Pancott	Great Britain	8.65	8.80	17.45	did not advance		
96	Günter Nachtigall	United Team of Germany	8.05	9.35	17.40	did not advance		
97	Valery Kerdemelidi	Soviet Union	9.45	7.90	17.35	did not advance		
98	Marcel Coppin	Luxembourg	8.45	8.80	17.25	did not advance		
99	Józef Rajnisz	Poland	8.00	9.05	17.05	did not advance		
99	Johann König	Austria	8.25	8.80	17.05	did not advance		
101	Michel Kiesgen	Luxembourg	8.00	9.00	17.00	did not advance		
102	Ramón García	Spain	8.20	8.75	16.95	did not advance		
102	John Mulhall	Great Britain	8.45	8.50	16.95	did not advance		
104	William Thoresson	Sweden	7.50	9.20	16.70	did not advance		
105	Benjamin de Roo	Australia	8.15	8.35	16.50	did not advance		
106	Bo Wirhed	Sweden	7.50	8.95	16.45	did not advance		
107	Emilio Lecuona	Spain	7.70	8.40	16.10	did not advance		
107	Jean Cronstedt	Sweden	7.00	9.10	16.10	did not advance		
107	Gerhard Huber	Austria	8.05	8.05	16.10	did not advance		
110	Dragan Gagić	Yugoslavia	7.80	8.25	16.05	did not advance		
111	Abdel Vares Sharraf	United Arab Republic	7.05	8.90	15.95	did not advance		
112	Léopold Desmet	Belgium	8.15	7.70	15.85	did not advance		
113	Leif Koorn	Sweden	6.65	8.85	15.50	did not advance		
113	Anton Hertl	Austria	6.90	8.60	15.50	did not advance		
115	Graham Bond	Australia	7.95	7.50	15.45	did not advance		
116	Hermenegildo Candeias	Portugal	6.65	8.65	15.30	did not advance		
116	Hubert Erang	Luxembourg	6.80	8.50	15.30	did not advance		
118	Ken Buffin	Great Britain	7.85	7.30	15.15	did not advance		
119	Armando Valles	Mexico	7.20	7.85	15.05	did not advance		
120	Willi Kafel	Austria	7.65	6.80	14.45	did not advance		
121	François Eisenbarth	Luxembourg	6.40	7.80	14.20	did not advance		
122	Juan Caviglia	Argentina	7.10	7.00	14.10	did not advance		
122	Mohamed Sekkat	Morocco	6.00	8.10	14.10	did not advance		
124	Ahmed Fellat	Morocco	3.50	6.90	10.40	did not advance		
125	Abdesselem Regragui	Morocco	4.50	5.75	10.25	did not advance		
126	Miloud M'Sellek	Morocco	4.00	5.50	9.50	did not advance		
127	Darif Tanjaoui	Morocco	3.00	6.25	9.25	did not advance		
128	Peter Starling	Great Britain	7.95	—	7.95	did not advance		
129	Kacem Klifa	Morocco	—	2.50	2.50	did not advance		
