= Gymnastics at the 1960 Summer Olympics – Men's pommel horse =

Men's pommel horse at the Games of the XVII Olympiad
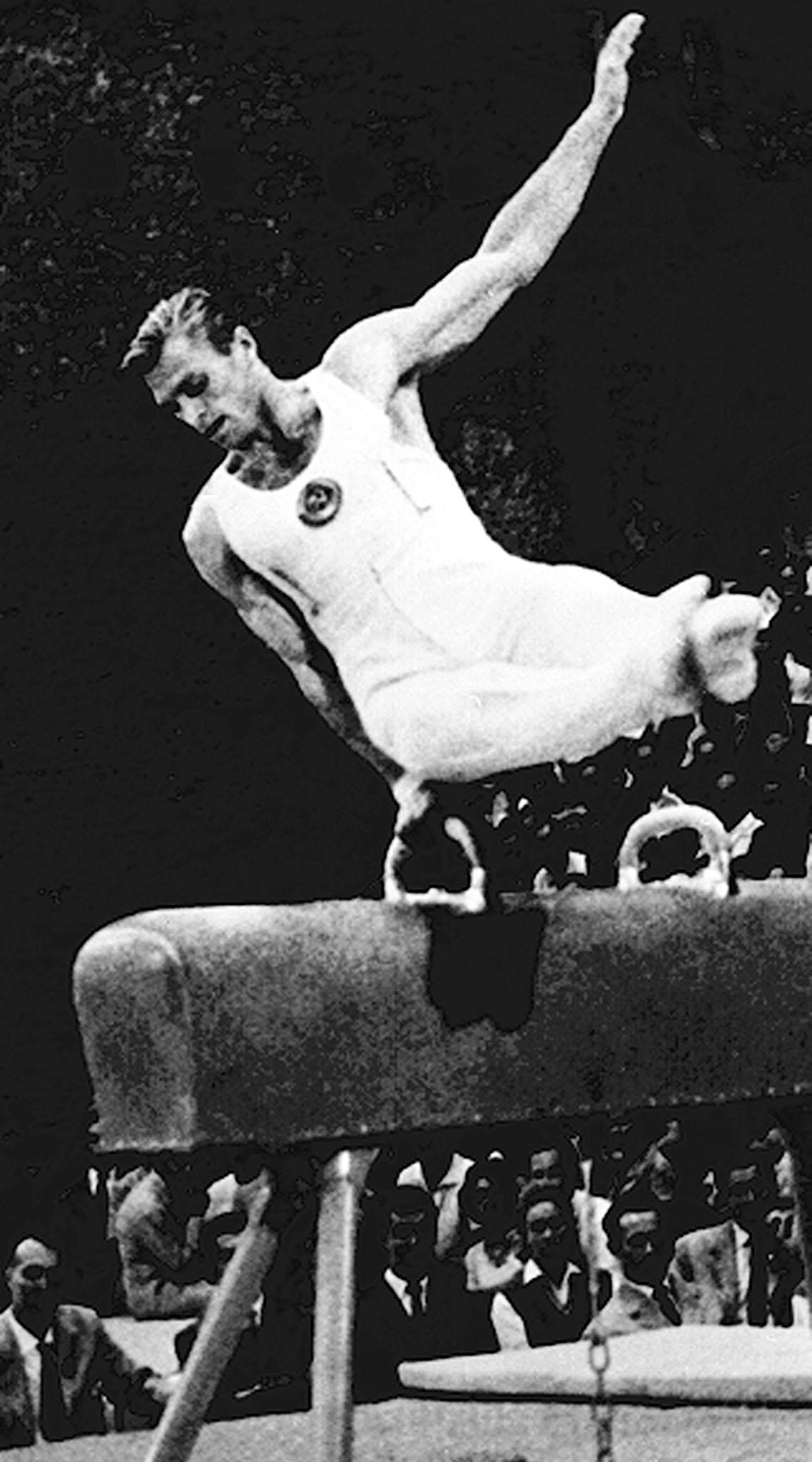
- Boris Shakhlin on the pommel horse
- Venue: Baths of Caracalla
- Dates: 5–10 September 1960
- Competitors: 128 from 28 nations
- Winning score: 19.375

Medalists
1st place, gold medalist(s)		Eugen Ekman; Finland
1st place, gold medalist(s)		Boris Shakhlin; Soviet Union
3rd place, bronze medalist(s)		Shuji Tsurumi; Japan

The men's pommel horse competition was one of eight events for male competitors in artistic gymnastics at the 1960 Summer Olympics in Rome. It was held on 5, 7, and 10 September at the Baths of Caracalla. There were 128 competitors from 28 nations, with nations in the team competition having up to 6 gymnasts and other nations entering up to 2 gymnasts. There was a tie for first place in the pommel horse. Boris Shakhlin of the Soviet Union and Eugen Ekman of Finland each received a gold medal. It was the third consecutive Games with a gold medal for the Soviets, as Shakhlin became the first man to successfully repeat as Olympic champion in the event (and second to win multiple medals of any color). Ekman's medal was the only medal in men's artistic gymnastics in 1960 that did not go to the Soviet Union or Japan. Third place and the bronze medal went to Japan's Shuji Tsurumi.

The 1960 gymnastics competitions introduced apparatus finals, with the all-around competition serving as a qualifying round for the pommel horse final.

== Background ==
This was the 10th appearance of the event, which is one of the five apparatus events held every time there were apparatus events at the Summer Olympics (no apparatus events were held in 1900, 1908, 1912, or 1920). Five of the top 11 (including ties for 9th) gymnasts from 1956 returned: gold medalist Boris Shakhlin of the Soviet Union, silver medalist Takashi Ono of Japan, fifth-place finisher Yury Titov of the Soviet Union, sixth-place finisher Jaroslav Bím of Czechoslovakia, and seventh-place finisher Masao Takemoto of Japan. Shakhlin was also the reigning (1958) world champion.

Morocco and South Korea each made their debut in the men's pommel horse; the short-lived United Arab Republic made its only appearance. The United States made its ninth appearance, most of any nation, having missed only the inaugural 1896 Games.

== Competition format ==
The gymnastics all-around events continued to use the aggregation format. Each nation entered a team of six gymnasts or up to two individual gymnasts. All entrants in the gymnastics competitions performed both a compulsory exercise and a voluntary exercise for each apparatus. The scores for all 12 exercises were summed to give an individual all-around score.

These exercise scores were also used for qualification for the new apparatus finals. The two exercises (compulsory and voluntary) for each apparatus were summed to give an apparatus score; the top 6 in each apparatus participated in the finals; others were ranked 7th through 130th. For the apparatus finals, the all-around score for that apparatus was multiplied by one-half then added to the final round exercise score to give a final total.

Exercise scores ranged from 0 to 10, with the final total apparatus score from 0 to 20.

== Schedule ==
All times are Central European Time (UTC+1)

Date	Time	Round
Monday, 5 September 1960	8:00; 17:00	Preliminary: Compulsory
Wednesday, 7 September 1960	8:00; 17:00	Preliminary: Voluntary
Saturday, 10 September 1960	15:00	Final

== Results ==
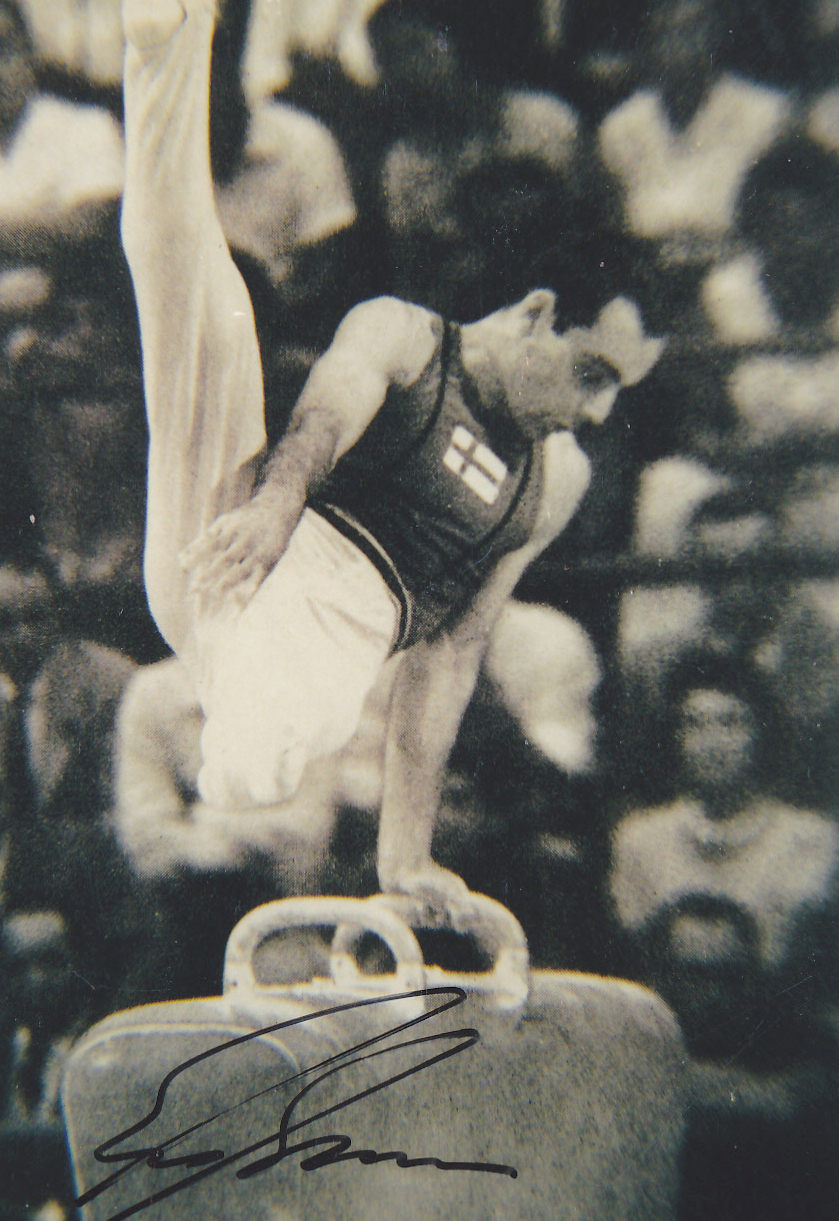
Eugen Ekman on the pommel horse

Rank	Gymnast	Nation	Preliminary			Final		
Rank	Gymnast	Nation	Compulsory	Voluntary	Total	1/2 Prelim.	Final	Total
1st place, gold medalist(s)	Eugen Ekman	Finland	9.55	9.70	19.25	9.625	9.750	19.375
1st place, gold medalist(s)	Boris Shakhlin	Soviet Union	9.60	9.75	19.35	9.675	9.700	19.375
3rd place, bronze medalist(s)	Shuji Tsurumi	Japan	9.50	9.60	19.10	9.550	9.600	19.150
4	Takashi Mitsukuri	Japan	9.60	9.55	19.15	9.575	9.550	19.125
5	Yury Titov	Soviet Union	9.55	9.65	19.20	9.600	9.350	18.950
6	Takashi Ono	Japan	9.60	9.55	19.15	9.575	8.950	18.525
7	Miroslav Cerar	Yugoslavia	9.60	9.45	19.05	did not advance		
8	Kauko Heikkinen	Finland	9.40	9.60	19.00	did not advance		
8	Larry Banner	United States	9.50	9.50	19.00	did not advance		
10	Yukio Endo	Japan	9.45	9.40	18.85	did not advance		
10	Nikolai Miligulo	Soviet Union	9.50	9.35	18.85	did not advance		
12	Jaroslav Šťastný	Czechoslovakia	9.30	9.50	18.80	did not advance		
12	Valery Kerdemelidi	Soviet Union	9.40	9.40	18.80	did not advance		
12	Orlando Polmonari	Italy	9.30	9.50	18.80	did not advance		
15	Åge Storhaug	Norway	9.35	9.40	18.75	did not advance		
15	Gar O'Quinn	United States	9.30	9.45	18.75	did not advance		
15	Gianfranco Marzolla	Italy	9.35	9.40	18.75	did not advance		
18	Vladimir Portnoy	Soviet Union	9.30	9.40	18.70	did not advance		
18	Pavel Gajdoš	Czechoslovakia	9.20	9.50	18.70	did not advance		
18	Jack Beckner	United States	9.40	9.30	18.70	did not advance		
18	Josy Stoffel	Luxembourg	9.25	9.45	18.70	did not advance		
18	Dragan Gagić	Yugoslavia	9.35	9.35	18.70	did not advance		
23	Franco Menichelli	Italy	9.35	9.30	18.65	did not advance		
23	Ivan Čaklec	Yugoslavia	9.25	9.40	18.65	did not advance		
23	Angelo Vicardi	Italy	9.20	9.45	18.65	did not advance		
26	Nobuyuki Aihara	Japan	9.40	9.20	18.60	did not advance		
26	Masao Takemoto	Japan	9.30	9.30	18.60	did not advance		
26	Don Tonry	United States	9.25	9.35	18.60	did not advance		
26	Fritz Feuz	Switzerland	9.25	9.35	18.60	did not advance		
30	Albert Azaryan	Soviet Union	9.45	9.10	18.55	did not advance		
30	Giovanni Carminucci	Italy	9.25	9.30	18.55	did not advance		
30	Edy Thomi	Switzerland	9.25	9.30	18.55	did not advance		
33	Jaroslav Bím	Czechoslovakia	9.10	9.40	18.50	did not advance		
33	Fred Orlofsky	United States	9.10	9.40	18.50	did not advance		
33	Józef Rajnisz	Poland	9.20	9.30	18.50	did not advance		
36	Kurt Wigartz	Sweden	8.90	7.25	18.45	did not advance		
36	Sakari Olkkonen	Finland	9.20	9.25	18.45	did not advance		
38	János Mester	Hungary	8.80	9.10	18.40	did not advance		
38	Jean Jaillard	France	8.75	8.80	18.40	did not advance		
40	Günter Nachtigall	United Team of Germany	9.10	9.25	18.35	did not advance		
40	Pasquale Carminucci	Italy	9.10	9.25	18.35	did not advance		
42	Ferdinand Daniš	Czechoslovakia	9.25	9.05	18.30	did not advance		
42	Josef Trmal	Czechoslovakia	9.00	9.30	18.30	did not advance		
42	Velik Kapsazov	Bulgaria	9.05	8.90	18.30	did not advance		
42	Alojz Petrovič	Yugoslavia	9.10	9.20	18.30	did not advance		
46	Siegfried Fülle	United Team of Germany	8.95	9.30	18.25	did not advance		
46	Raimo Heinonen	Finland	9.15	9.10	18.25	did not advance		
48	Ladislav Pazdera	Czechoslovakia	8.80	9.40	18.20	did not advance		
48	Olavi Leimuvirta	Finland	9.15	9.05	18.20	did not advance		
48	Max Benker	Switzerland	8.85	9.35	18.20	did not advance		
51	Ernst Fivian	Switzerland	8.95	9.20	18.15	did not advance		
51	Otto Kestola	Finland	9.20	8.95	18.15	did not advance		
51	Nik Stuart	Great Britain	9.35	8.80	18.15	did not advance		
54	Mohamed Lazhari	France	8.70	8.90	18.10	did not advance		
54	André Brüllmann	Switzerland	9.00	9.10	18.10	did not advance		
54	Bo Wirhed	Sweden	9.30	5.50	18.10	did not advance		
57	Lajos Varga	Hungary	9.25	8.70	18.05	did not advance		
57	Leif Koorn	Sweden	9.20	8.25	18.05	did not advance		
59	Hans Schwarzentruber	Switzerland	9.15	8.85	18.00	did not advance		
59	Rajmund Csányi	Hungary	8.85	7.35	18.00	did not advance		
59	Todor Bachvarov	Bulgaria	8.80	9.30	18.00	did not advance		
62	Alfred Kucharczyk	Poland	8.95	9.00	17.95	did not advance		
62	Andrzej Konopka	Poland	8.75	9.20	17.95	did not advance		
62	Ernest Hawełek	Poland	9.00	8.95	17.95	did not advance		
65	Philipp Fürst	United Team of Germany	8.40	9.50	17.90	did not advance		
65	Günter Lyhs	United Team of Germany	8.90	9.00	17.90	did not advance		
65	Bernard Fauqueux	France	8.85	9.35	17.90	did not advance		
65	Hans Sauter	Austria	9.05	8.85	17.90	did not advance		
69	Rudolf Keszthelyi	Hungary	9.20	9.00	17.85	did not advance		
69	Milenko Lekić	Yugoslavia	9.00	8.85	17.85	did not advance		
69	Géza Bejek	Hungary	8.70	9.20	17.85	did not advance		
69	Lyuben Khristov	Bulgaria	9.15	9.15	17.85	did not advance		
73	Jerzy Jokiel	Poland	9.00	8.80	17.80	did not advance		
73	Stig Lindewall	Sweden	9.10	7.80	17.80	did not advance		
73	Jaime Belenguer	Spain	8.50	9.30	17.80	did not advance		
76	Abie Grossfeld	United States	8.95	8.80	17.75	did not advance		
77	Michel Mathiot	France	8.95	9.25	17.70	did not advance		
78	Sándor Békési	Hungary	9.30	8.20	17.60	did not advance		
78	Hermann Klien	Austria	8.70	8.90	17.60	did not advance		
80	Nikola Prodanov	Bulgaria	8.20	9.40	17.50	did not advance		
80	Aleksander Rokosa	Poland	8.50	9.00	17.50	did not advance		
82	Robert Caymaris	France	9.00	9.15	17.35	did not advance		
83	Armand Huberty	Luxembourg	8.60	8.70	17.30	did not advance		
83	Johann König	Austria	8.60	8.70	17.30	did not advance		
85	Marsel Markulin	Yugoslavia	8.35	8.90	17.25	did not advance		
86	Erwin Koppe	United Team of Germany	8.85	8.30	17.15	did not advance		
86	Richard Montpetit	Canada	8.30	8.85	17.15	did not advance		
86	Luis Valbuena	Spain	8.25	8.90	17.15	did not advance		
89	William Thoresson	Sweden	8.90	6.75	17.10	did not advance		
89	Ahmed Goneim	United Arab Republic	9.00	8.85	17.10	did not advance		
91	Karlheinz Friedrich	United Team of Germany	7.80	9.20	17.00	did not advance		
92	Daniel Touche	France	9.10	9.00	16.75	did not advance		
92	Willi Kafel	Austria	8.30	8.45	16.75	did not advance		
92	Armando Valles	Mexico	7.90	8.85	16.75	did not advance		
95	Abdel Vares Sharraf	United Arab Republic	9.10	8.85	16.65	did not advance		
96	Emilio Lecuona	Spain	8.25	8.30	16.55	did not advance		
97	Jean Cronstedt	Sweden	9.00	7.70	16.50	did not advance		
97	Michel Kiesgen	Luxembourg	7.70	8.80	16.50	did not advance		
99	Jack Pancott	Great Britain	7.80	8.60	16.40	did not advance		
100	Dick Gradley	Great Britain	7.65	8.70	16.35	did not advance		
100	Gerhard Huber	Austria	8.70	7.65	16.35	did not advance		
102	Ramón García	Spain	7.55	8.55	16.10	did not advance		
103	Georgi Khristov	Bulgaria	7.20	8.65	16.00	did not advance		
104	Stoyan Stoyanov	Bulgaria	7.00	9.20	15.85	did not advance		
105	Enrique Montserrat	Spain	7.20	8.60	15.80	did not advance		
106	Hermenegildo Candeias	Portugal	7.65	8.00	15.65	did not advance		
107	Marcel Coppin	Luxembourg	7.25	8.25	15.50	did not advance		
108	Ismail Abdallah	United Arab Republic	8.15	7.70	15.40	did not advance		
109	Kim Sang-guk	South Korea	6.95	8.25	15.20	did not advance		
110	Ahmed Dakkeli	United Arab Republic	8.55	7.80	15.05	did not advance		
110	René Marteaux	Belgium	6.60	8.45	15.05	did not advance		
112	Hubert Erang	Luxembourg	6.85	8.00	14.85	did not advance		
113	John Mulhall	Great Britain	6.50	8.20	14.70	did not advance		
114	Juan Caviglia	Argentina	7.60	6.90	14.50	did not advance		
115	Ken Buffin	Great Britain	7.80	6.60	14.40	did not advance		
116	Selim El-Sayed	United Arab Republic	8.70	7.60	14.35	did not advance		
117	Benjamin de Roo	Australia	6.50	7.65	14.15	did not advance		
118	Graham Bond	Australia	6.50	7.50	14.00	did not advance		
119	François Eisenbarth	Luxembourg	5.00	7.75	12.75	did not advance		
120	Ahmed Issam Allam	United Arab Republic	8.10	7.20	12.70	did not advance		
121	Léopold Desmet	Belgium	5.25	7.15	12.40	did not advance		
122	Mohamed Sekkat	Morocco	4.35	6.00	10.35	did not advance		
123	Ahmed Fellat	Morocco	4.00	5.50	9.50	did not advance		
124	Darif Tanjaoui	Morocco	3.80	5.25	9.05	did not advance		
125	Abdesselem Regragui	Morocco	4.00	4.75	8.75	did not advance		
126	Peter Starling	Great Britain	8.65	—	8.65	did not advance		
127	Miloud M'Sellek	Morocco	3.00	4.00	7.00	did not advance		
128	Anton Hertl	Austria	6.70	—	6.70	did not advance		
