= Gymnastics at the 1960 Summer Olympics – Men's artistic team all-around =

Men's artistic team all-around at the Games of the XVII Olympiad
- Venue: Baths of Caracalla
- Date: 5–7 September 1960
- Competitors: 120 from 20 nations
- Winning score: 575.20

Medalists
1st place, gold medalist(s)		Nobuyuki Aihara; Yukio Endō; Takashi Mitsukuri; Takashi Ono; Masao Takemoto; Shuji Tsurumi	Japan
2nd place, silver medalist(s)		Albert Azaryan; Valery Kerdemilidi; Nikolai Miligulo; Vladimir Portnoi; Boris Shakhlin; Yuri Titov	Soviet Union
3rd place, bronze medalist(s)		Giovanni Carminucci; Pasquale Carminucci; Gianfranco Marzolla; Franco Menichelli; Orlando Polmonari; Angelo Vicardi	Italy

These are the results of the men's team all-around competition, one of eight events for male competitors in artistic gymnastics at the 1960 Summer Olympics in Rome.

== Competition format ==
The gymnastics all-around events continued to use the aggregation format. Each nation entered a team of six gymnasts. All entrants in the gymnastics competitions performed both a compulsory exercise and a voluntary exercise for each apparatus. The top five individual scores in each exercise (that is, compulsory floor, voluntary floor, compulsory vault, etc.) were added to give a team score for that exercise. The 12 team exercise scores were summed to give a team total.

No separate finals were contested for the all-around events, though separate apparatus finals were added.

Exercise scores ranged from 0 to 10, apparatus scores from 0 to 20, individual totals from 0 to 120, and team scores from 0 to 600.

== Results ==
Rank	Nation	Gymnasts	Exercise results												Team total
Rank	Nation	Gymnasts	Floor (gymnastics)		Rings (gymnastics)		Pommel horse		Vault (gymnastics)		Parallel bars		Horizontal bar		Team total
Rank	Nation	Gymnasts	C	V	C	V	C	V	C	V	C	V	C	V	Team total
1st place, gold medalist(s)	Japan	Nobuyuki Aihara	9.50	9.80	9.65	9.75	9.40	~~9.20~~	9.35	9.50	9.60	9.65	9.50	~~9.50~~	575.20
1st place, gold medalist(s)	Japan	Yukio Endo	9.40	9.50	9.60	~~9.40~~	9.45	9.40	9.55	~~9.50~~	9.70	9.50	9.70	9.75	575.20
1st place, gold medalist(s)	Japan	Takashi Mitsukuri	9.40	9.60	~~9.50~~	9.50	9.60	9.55	9.40	9.55	9.65	~~9.15~~	9.55	9.65	575.20
1st place, gold medalist(s)	Japan	Takashi Ono	9.35	9.65	9.75	9.70	9.60	9.55	9.60	9.70	9.80	9.60	9.80	9.80	575.20
1st place, gold medalist(s)	Japan	Masao Takemoto	~~9.30~~	9.50	9.60	9.65	~~9.30~~	9.30	~~9.35~~	9.65	9.70	9.55	9.80	9.75	575.20
1st place, gold medalist(s)	Japan	Shuji Tsurumi	9.45	~~9.40~~	9.60	9.60	9.50	9.60	9.45	9.55	~~9.55~~	9.60	~~9.50~~	9.75	575.20
1st place, gold medalist(s)	Japan	Total	47.10	48.05	48.20	48.20	47.55	47.40	47.35	47.95	48.45	47.90	48.35	48.70	575.20
2nd place, silver medalist(s)	Soviet Union	Albert Azaryan	~~9.20~~	~~9.35~~	9.85	9.90	9.45	~~9.10~~	9.30	9.40	~~9.25~~	9.10	9.75	9.70	572.70
2nd place, silver medalist(s)	Soviet Union	Valery Kerdemelidi	9.30	9.50	9.60	9.60	9.40	9.40	~~9.25~~	~~9.35~~	9.45	~~7.90~~	9.55	9.65	572.70
2nd place, silver medalist(s)	Soviet Union	Nikolai Miligulo	9.35	9.45	9.50	~~9.50~~	9.50	9.35	9.30	9.50	9.45	9.30	~~9.40~~	~~9.45~~	572.70
2nd place, silver medalist(s)	Soviet Union	Boris Shakhlin	9.35	9.60	9.70	9.80	9.60	9.75	9.50	9.70	9.70	9.70	9.80	9.75	572.70
2nd place, silver medalist(s)	Soviet Union	Yury Titov	9.50	9.75	9.70	9.75	9.55	9.65	9.50	9.50	9.65	9.55	9.70	9.80	572.70
2nd place, silver medalist(s)	Soviet Union	Vladimir Portnoy	9.45	9.50	~~9.45~~	9.55	~~9.30~~	9.40	9.60	9.65	9.40	9.00	9.50	9.50	572.70
2nd place, silver medalist(s)	Soviet Union	Total	46.95	47.80	48.35	48.60	47.50	47.55	47.20	47.75	47.65	46.65	48.30	48.40	572.70
3rd place, bronze medalist(s)	Italy	Giovanni Carminucci	9.25	9.25	8.90	9.50	9.25	9.30	9.20	9.65	9.60	9.75	9.35	9.30	559.05
3rd place, bronze medalist(s)	Italy	Pasquale Carminucci	9.05	9.25	9.35	9.45	~~9.10~~	~~9.25~~	8.90	9.35	9.15	~~9.20~~	9.05	9.30	559.05
3rd place, bronze medalist(s)	Italy	Gianfranco Marzolla	~~8.60~~	9.45	9.15	9.55	9.35	9.40	8.95	9.25	~~8.20~~	9.25	~~8.70~~	9.20	559.05
3rd place, bronze medalist(s)	Italy	Franco Menichelli	9.50	9.55	9.55	9.75	9.35	9.30	9.35	9.50	9.55	9.60	9.40	9.40	559.05
3rd place, bronze medalist(s)	Italy	Orlando Polmonari	8.90	~~9.20~~	9.00	~~9.30~~	9.30	9.50	~~8.75~~	~~9.25~~	9.00	9.20	9.25	9.30	559.05
3rd place, bronze medalist(s)	Italy	Angelo Vicardi	9.15	9.30	~~8.80~~	9.40	9.20	9.45	9.30	9.35	9.10	9.55	9.30	~~9.00~~	559.05
3rd place, bronze medalist(s)	Italy	Total	45.85	46.80	45.95	47.65	46.45	46.95	45.70	47.10	46.40	47.35	46.35	46.50	559.05
4	Czechoslovakia	Jaroslav Bím	~~8.95~~	9.20	9.30	9.30	9.10	9.40	8.85	9.35	9.45	9.35	9.30	9.45	557.15
4	Czechoslovakia	Ferdinand Daniš	9.40	9.30	9.30	9.50	9.25	~~9.05~~	8.95	9.40	9.35	9.45	9.50	9.65	557.15
4	Czechoslovakia	Pavel Gajdoš	9.15	9.20	8.90	9.40	9.20	9.50	9.05	9.40	9.25	9.00	9.30	9.25	557.15
4	Czechoslovakia	Ladislav Pazdera	9.05	9.30	9.10	9.30	~~8.80~~	9.40	~~8.35~~	~~9.20~~	9.25	~~8.80~~	~~9.00~~	9.30	557.15
4	Czechoslovakia	Jaroslav Šťastný	9.45	9.55	~~8.80~~	~~9.15~~	9.30	9.50	9.05	9.40	9.35	9.05	9.30	9.60	557.15
4	Czechoslovakia	Josef Trmal	9.30	~~9.15~~	9.55	9.40	9.00	9.30	9.00	9.40	~~9.00~~	9.10	9.15	~~8.90~~	557.15
4	Czechoslovakia	Total	46.35	46.55	46.15	46.90	45.85	47.10	44.90	46.95	46.65	45.95	46.55	47.25	557.15
5	United States	Larry Banner	9.10	9.20	9.50	9.30	9.50	9.50	9.05	9.30	~~9.10~~	~~9.00~~	9.10	9.40	555.20
5	United States	Jack Beckner	9.20	9.15	~~9.10~~	9.15	9.40	9.30	8.90	9.20	9.45	9.25	9.25	9.50	555.20
5	United States	Abie Grossfeld	~~8.85~~	9.45	9.35	9.40	~~8.95~~	~~8.80~~	8.90	~~8.95~~	9.25	9.20	9.30	9.65	555.20
5	United States	Gar O'Quinn	9.15	9.15	9.40	~~8.20~~	9.30	9.45	~~8.75~~	9.15	9.15	9.15	~~8.95~~	9.20	555.20
5	United States	Fred Orlofsky	8.90	~~9.00~~	9.45	9.15	9.10	9.40	9.20	9.35	9.30	9.15	9.15	~~8.30~~	555.20
5	United States	Don Tonry	9.10	9.40	9.20	9.00	9.25	9.35	9.20	9.25	9.30	9.15	9.05	9.50	555.20
5	United States	Total	45.45	46.35	46.90	46.00	46.55	47.00	45.25	46.25	46.45	45.90	45.85	47.25	555.20
6	Finland	Eugen Ekman	8.95	9.15	~~8.90~~	9.25	9.55	9.70	~~8.55~~	9.00	9.25	9.40	9.30	9.45	554.45
6	Finland	Kauko Heikkinen	9.30	9.15	9.15	~~8.75~~	9.40	9.60	8.70	~~8.95~~	9.15	~~9.30~~	9.20	9.20	554.45
6	Finland	Raimo Heinonen	9.05	~~8.90~~	9.05	9.05	9.15	9.10	8.60	9.20	9.25	9.50	9.40	9.35	554.45
6	Finland	Otto Kestola	9.35	9.40	9.40	9.50	9.20	~~8.95~~	8.90	9.20	9.55	9.45	9.50	9.60	554.45
6	Finland	Olavi Leimuvirta	9.15	8.95	9.25	9.05	~~9.15~~	9.05	8.90	9.25	9.40	9.55	9.15	9.40	554.45
6	Finland	Sakari Olkkonen	~~8.80~~	9.10	9.20	9.45	9.20	9.25	8.75	9.30	~~8.90~~	9.50	~~8.95~~	~~9.00~~	554.45
6	Finland	Total	45.80	45.75	46.05	46.30	46.50	46.70	43.85	45.95	46.60	47.40	46.55	47.00	554.45
7	United Team of Germany	Karlheinz Friedrich	~~8.85~~	~~9.15~~	~~9.05~~	9.30	~~7.80~~	9.20	9.10	~~9.10~~	8.85	~~9.00~~	9.15	9.45	553.35
7	United Team of Germany	Siegfried Fülle	9.40	9.50	9.40	9.40	8.95	9.30	8.90	9.35	9.00	9.05	9.15	9.20	553.35
7	United Team of Germany	Philipp Fürst	9.20	9.40	9.50	9.45	8.40	9.50	8.95	9.25	9.60	9.55	9.35	~~4.50~~	553.35
7	United Team of Germany	Erwin Koppe	8.95	9.35	9.45	9.50	8.85	~~8.30~~	~~8.45~~	9.20	9.20	9.35	~~9.00~~	9.45	553.35
7	United Team of Germany	Günter Lyhs	9.15	9.40	9.40	~~9.15~~	8.90	9.00	9.00	9.40	9.35	9.50	9.15	9.40	553.35
7	United Team of Germany	Günter Nachtigall	9.05	9.25	9.35	9.20	9.10	9.25	8.95	9.35	~~8.05~~	9.35	9.10	8.65	553.35
7	United Team of Germany	Total	45.75	46.90	47.10	46.85	44.20	46.25	44.90	46.55	46.00	46.80	45.90	46.15	553.35
8	Switzerland	Max Benker	8.95	9.05	8.75	9.30	~~8.85~~	9.35	9.00	9.35	9.50	9.50	9.10	9.30	551.45
8	Switzerland	André Brüllmann	~~8.90~~	~~9.05~~	9.20	8.80	9.00	9.10	~~8.60~~	~~9.15~~	9.45	9.45	9.25	9.20	551.45
8	Switzerland	Fritz Feuz	9.00	9.20	9.00	9.20	9.25	9.35	8.70	9.45	9.60	9.55	9.20	~~8.35~~	551.45
8	Switzerland	Ernst Fivian	9.40	9.55	8.65	9.35	8.95	9.20	9.10	9.35	9.45	9.60	9.20	9.25	551.45
8	Switzerland	Hans Schwarzentruber	9.00	9.25	9.10	9.35	9.15	~~8.85~~	8.75	9.35	9.25	~~9.35~~	9.10	8.65	551.45
8	Switzerland	Edy Thomi	9.05	9.15	~~8.15~~	~~8.75~~	9.25	9.30	8.50	9.15	9.20	9.40	~~9.00~~	9.45	551.45
8	Switzerland	Total	45.40	46.20	44.70	46.00	45.60	46.30	44.15	46.65	47.25	47.50	45.85	45.85	551.45
9	Yugoslavia	Ivan Čaklec	9.20	9.30	~~8.40~~	8.95	9.25	9.40	8.80	9.30	8.75	8.75	9.30	9.30	550.80
9	Yugoslavia	Miroslav Cerar	9.40	9.35	9.45	9.60	9.60	9.45	9.35	9.40	9.45	9.70	9.65	9.85	550.80
9	Yugoslavia	Dragan Gagić	~~8.90~~	9.30	8.65	9.25	9.35	9.35	~~7.95~~	9.25	~~7.80~~	~~8.25~~	9.15	~~7.50~~	550.80
9	Yugoslavia	Milenko Lekić	9.10	~~9.10~~	9.10	~~8.95~~	9.00	~~8.85~~	8.65	9.25	9.00	8.95	9.20	8.90	550.80
9	Yugoslavia	Marsel Markulin	9.20	9.20	9.10	9.10	~~8.35~~	8.90	8.70	~~9.15~~	8.80	9.00	9.10	8.85	550.80
9	Yugoslavia	Alojz Petrovič	8.95	9.15	9.20	9.35	9.10	9.20	9.00	9.25	9.20	9.15	~~9.05~~	9.30	550.80
9	Yugoslavia	Total	45.85	46.30	45.50	46.25	46.30	46.30	44.50	46.45	45.20	45.55	46.40	46.20	550.80
10	Poland	Ernest Hawełek	9.00	9.05	9.20	9.05	9.00	8.95	8.85	9.15	8.80	9.00	9.20	9.30	546.60
10	Poland	Jerzy Jokiel	9.40	9.50	~~8.95~~	9.05	9.00	~~8.80~~	8.95	9.05	9.10	~~9.00~~	9.15	8.50	546.60
10	Poland	Andrzej Konopka	9.20	9.30	9.25	9.20	8.75	9.20	8.80	~~8.65~~	9.10	9.25	9.20	9.30	546.60
10	Poland	Alfred Kucharczyk	9.30	9.40	9.10	~~8.50~~	8.95	9.00	8.55	9.40	8.95	9.30	9.10	9.15	546.60
10	Poland	Józef Rajnisz	~~8.35~~	~~9.00~~	9.35	9.35	9.20	9.30	8.75	8.95	~~8.00~~	9.05	~~8.85~~	9.20	546.60
10	Poland	Aleksander Rokosa	9.00	9.20	9.45	9.15	~~8.50~~	9.00	~~7.65~~	8.90	9.20	9.35	9.20	~~8.20~~	546.60
10	Poland	Total	45.90	46.45	46.35	45.80	44.90	45.45	43.90	45.45	45.15	45.95	45.85	45.45	546.60
10	Bulgaria	Todor Bachvarov	8.60	9.15	9.25	9.10	8.80	9.30	~~7.85~~	9.05	9.05	9.35	9.00	9.20	546.60
10	Bulgaria	Velik Kapsazov	8.85	9.40	9.65	9.70	9.05	8.90	8.60	9.35	9.30	9.30	9.25	9.45	546.60
10	Bulgaria	Georgi Khristov	8.60	9.20	9.40	9.35	7.20	~~8.65~~	9.00	~~9.00~~	8.85	9.00	~~9.00~~	~~8.85~~	546.60
10	Bulgaria	Lyuben Khristov	~~8.40~~	~~8.95~~	9.20	9.00	9.15	9.15	8.80	9.35	9.20	~~8.90~~	9.20	9.30	546.60
10	Bulgaria	Nikola Prodanov	9.00	9.35	~~9.20~~	~~8.95~~	8.20	9.40	9.15	9.40	~~8.65~~	9.15	9.05	9.30	546.60
10	Bulgaria	Stoyan Stoyanov	8.70	9.05	9.25	9.50	~~7.00~~	9.20	9.05	9.30	9.40	9.40	9.15	9.55	546.60
10	Bulgaria	Total	43.75	46.15	46.75	46.65	42.40	45.95	44.60	46.45	45.80	46.20	45.65	46.80	546.60
12	Hungary	Géza Bejek	~~8.60~~	9.05	8.85	8.75	~~8.70~~	9.20	8.70	9.05	8.95	8.90	8.70	~~8.30~~	545.45
12	Hungary	Sándor Békési	9.10	9.20	8.75	~~8.75~~	9.30	8.20	9.05	9.30	8.95	9.10	~~6.30~~	9.15	545.45
12	Hungary	Rajmund Csányi	9.15	~~9.05~~	9.25	9.45	8.85	~~7.35~~	9.10	9.15	9.45	~~8.70~~	9.40	9.40	545.45
12	Hungary	Rudolf Keszthelyi	9.30	9.30	9.25	9.20	9.20	9.00	8.85	9.15	9.30	8.90	9.00	9.00	545.45
12	Hungary	János Mester	8.90	9.15	~~8.15~~	8.95	8.80	9.10	~~8.60~~	9.05	~~8.75~~	8.75	9.10	8.95	545.45
12	Hungary	Lajos Varga	9.10	9.10	9.40	9.35	9.25	8.70	9.25	~~9.00~~	9.35	9.35	9.20	9.20	545.45
12	Hungary	Total	45.55	45.80	45.50	45.70	45.40	44.20	44.95	45.70	46.00	45.00	45.40	92.45	545.45
13	France	Robert Caymaris	8.80	9.35	8.10	9.20	9.00	9.15	8.85	9.00	9.35	~~8.35~~	~~8.90~~	9.00	536.90
13	France	Bernard Fauqueux	9.00	9.25	9.15	9.20	8.85	9.35	8.90	9.10	9.15	9.00	9.20	9.20	536.90
13	France	Jean Jaillard	~~8.25~~	~~9.00~~	8.00	~~8.65~~	8.75	~~8.80~~	8.70	~~9.00~~	9.00	8.50	9.10	9.05	536.90
13	France	Mohamed Lazhari	9.05	9.20	8.55	8.90	~~8.70~~	8.90	8.10	9.05	9.40	8.70	9.35	9.30	536.90
13	France	Michel Mathiot	8.40	9.10	~~7.85~~	8.70	8.95	9.25	7.65	9.10	8.95	9.20	9.20	9.45	536.90
13	France	Daniel Touche	8.80	9.15	8.90	8.95	9.10	9.00	~~6.00~~	9.10	~~8.90~~	9.00	9.05	~~9.00~~	536.90
13	France	Total	44.05	46.05	42.70	44.95	44.65	45.65	42.20	45.35	45.85	44.40	45.90	45.70	536.90
14	Sweden	Jean Cronstedt	~~8.70~~	~~8.60~~	8.85	8.80	9.00	7.70	~~6.10~~	8.95	7.00	9.10	9.30	8.35	532.95
14	Sweden	Leif Koorn	8.80	8.85	9.50	9.35	9.20	8.25	8.45	9.30	~~6.65~~	~~8.85~~	~~7.90~~	8.60	532.95
14	Sweden	Stig Lindewall	9.05	9.20	9.35	9.30	9.10	7.80	8.70	~~8.95~~	9.05	9.25	8.80	9.00	532.95
14	Sweden	William Thoresson	9.35	9.30	~~8.25~~	~~8.55~~	8.90	6.75	9.20	9.30	7.50	9.20	8.25	~~7.65~~	532.95
14	Sweden	Kurt Wigartz	9.15	9.05	8.60	8.85	~~8.90~~	7.25	8.45	9.25	8.50	9.00	8.60	9.15	532.95
14	Sweden	Bo Wirhed	8.75	8.70	8.90	9.05	9.30	~~5.50~~	9.25	9.20	7.50	8.95	8.20	9.00	532.95
14	Sweden	Total	45.10	45.10	45.20	45.35	45.50	37.75	44.05	46.00	39.55	45.50	43.15	91.10	532.95
15	United Arab Republic	Ismail Abdallah	8.15	8.60	9.10	9.10	8.15	7.70	8.75	9.20	9.30	9.30	9.10	8.90	518.65
15	United Arab Republic	Ahmed Issam Allam	8.10	8.70	8.75	8.00	~~8.10~~	~~7.20~~	~~7.00~~	9.30	9.40	9.35	8.50	8.90	518.65
15	United Arab Republic	Ahmed Dakkeli	8.35	8.90	9.15	9.10	8.55	7.80	7.75	9.10	8.75	~~8.85~~	9.00	9.15	518.65
15	United Arab Republic	Selim El-Sayed	8.25	8.45	~~8.55~~	~~7.60~~	8.70	7.60	8.70	~~8.85~~	8.75	9.00	8.05	8.20	518.65
15	United Arab Republic	Ahmed Goneim	~~8.00~~	8.70	8.60	9.20	9.00	8.85	8.85	9.00	8.05	9.45	8.65	8.90	518.65
15	United Arab Republic	Abdel Vares Sharraf	8.30	~~8.20~~	9.40	9.30	9.10	8.85	8.40	9.00	~~7.05~~	8.90	~~7.85~~	~~8.45~~	518.65
15	United Arab Republic	Total	41.15	43.35	45.00	44.70	43.50	40.80	42.45	45.60	44.25	46.00	43.30	46.00	518.65
16	Austria	Anton Hertl	8.30	8.70	~~7.50~~	—	~~6.70~~	—	~~7.55~~	8.95	~~6.90~~	8.60	8.30	8.45	517.25
16	Austria	Gerhard Huber	~~8.00~~	~~8.30~~	8.35	8.80	8.70	7.65	8.40	8.70	8.05	8.05	~~7.85~~	~~7.80~~	517.25
16	Austria	Willi Kafel	8.45	9.10	8.20	8.50	8.30	8.45	8.80	8.95	7.65	~~6.80~~	8.50	8.90	517.25
16	Austria	Hermann Klien	8.25	8.60	8.05	8.75	8.70	8.90	8.40	~~8.50~~	8.90	8.95	8.75	8.75	517.25
16	Austria	Johann König	8.20	8.90	8.60	8.60	8.60	8.70	8.55	8.90	8.25	8.80	9.10	9.15	517.25
16	Austria	Hans Sauter	8.30	8.70	8.95	8.95	9.05	8.85	8.60	9.10	8.85	8.80	8.85	9.10	517.25
16	Austria	Total	41.50	44.00	42.15	43.60	43.35	42.55	42.75	44.60	41.70	43.20	43.50	44.35	517.25
17	Luxembourg	Marcel Coppin	8.40	8.50	8.05	8.65	7.25	8.25	8.75	8.85	8.45	8.80	8.80	8.80	516.90
17	Luxembourg	François Eisenbarth	~~6.85~~	~~7.10~~	7.45	~~7.80~~	~~5.00~~	~~7.75~~	~~7.75~~	~~8.45~~	~~6.40~~	~~7.80~~	~~7.45~~	7.30	516.90
17	Luxembourg	Hubert Erang	8.05	8.70	~~6.75~~	8.00	6.85	8.00	8.40	8.70	6.80	8.50	7.60	~~5.50~~	516.90
17	Luxembourg	Armand Huberty	8.60	8.95	8.95	9.15	8.60	8.70	8.75	9.10	8.85	9.05	9.30	9.55	516.90
17	Luxembourg	Michel Kiesgen	8.05	7.75	8.90	9.25	7.70	8.80	7.80	8.85	8.00	9.00	8.90	8.95	516.90
17	Luxembourg	Josy Stoffel	9.10	9.15	9.15	9.40	9.25	9.45	9.25	9.20	9.40	9.30	9.45	9.40	516.90
17	Luxembourg	Total	42.20	43.05	42.50	44.45	39.65	43.20	42.95	44.70	41.50	44.65	44.05	44.00	516.90
18	Spain	Jaime Belenguer	7.90	8.80	9.10	~~8.20~~	8.50	9.30	7.65	~~8.80~~	9.30	8.85	8.20	8.70	512.65
18	Spain	Ramón García	8.00	8.75	8.75	9.05	7.55	8.55	~~7.50~~	8.90	8.20	8.75	8.20	8.50	512.65
18	Spain	Emilio Lecuona	8.00	8.35	9.05	9.20	8.25	8.30	8.35	9.05	7.70	8.40	8.25	9.00	512.65
18	Spain	Hermenegildo Martínez	8.40	9.00	~~0.00~~	9.35	—	—	8.85	9.25	—	—	6.40	—	512.65
18	Spain	Enrique Montserrat	~~7.25~~	~~8.20~~	8.80	9.10	7.20	8.60	8.75	8.95	8.35	9.10	7.00	8.25	512.65
18	Spain	Luis Valbuena	8.50	8.95	8.70	9.30	8.25	8.90	8.85	8.85	8.40	9.15	~~3.00~~	8.05	512.65
18	Spain	Total	40.80	43.85	44.40	46.00	39.75	43.65	42.45	45.00	41.95	44.25	38.05	42.50	512.65
19	Great Britain	Ken Buffin	~~7.55~~	7.50	~~7.75~~	8.00	7.80	6.60	8.30	9.05	~~7.85~~	7.30	9.00	8.95	510.80
19	Great Britain	Dick Gradley	8.50	9.10	8.65	9.20	7.65	8.70	8.30	~~6.75~~	8.70	8.75	8.55	8.90	510.80
19	Great Britain	John Mulhall	8.10	8.25	8.15	8.50	~~6.50~~	8.20	8.45	8.60	8.45	8.50	8.00	7.95	510.80
19	Great Britain	Jack Pancott	8.85	8.80	8.50	8.80	7.80	8.60	8.20	9.15	8.65	8.80	8.10	6.90	510.80
19	Great Britain	Peter Starling	7.95	—	8.50	—	8.65	—	~~7.85~~	9.15	7.95	—	~~7.65~~	—	510.80
19	Great Britain	Nik Stuart	9.10	8.85	9.35	9.40	9.35	8.80	8.70	9.00	9.10	8.90	8.95	9.30	510.80
19	Great Britain	Total	42.50	42.50	43.15	43.90	41.25	40.90	41.95	44.95	42.85	42.25	42.60	42.00	510.80
20	Morocco	Ahmed Fellat	7.65	7.95	4.00	4.75	4.00	5.50	8.30	7.35	3.50	6.90	5.00	5.80	338.00
20	Morocco	Kacem Klifa	—	—	—	—	—	—	—	—	—	~~2.50~~	—	4.00	338.00
20	Morocco	Miloud M'Sellek	6.65	5.50	5.80	6.40	3.00	4.00	8.30	8.50	4.00	5.50	1.00	6.35	338.00
20	Morocco	Abdesselem Regragui	6.70	7.40	3.50	4.00	4.00	4.75	6.00	6.75	4.50	5.75	4.00	5.15	338.00
20	Morocco	Mohamed Sekkat	7.70	8.45	6.10	7.25	4.35	6.00	6.50	7.95	6.00	8.10	5.50	4.95	338.00
20	Morocco	Darif Tanjaoui	7.55	8.40	4.20	4.00	3.80	5.25	6.00	5.50	3.00	6.25	3.00	~~3.00~~	338.00
20	Morocco	Total	36.25	37.70	23.60	26.40	19.15	25.50	35.10	36.05	21.00	32.50	18.50	26.25	338.00
