= Hermenegildo Martínez =

Spanish gymnast

- Full name: Hermenegildo Martínez Sabido
- Born: 13 August 1937 (age 89) Melilla, Spain

Gymnastics career
- Discipline: Men's artistic gymnastics
- Country represented: Spain

Hermenegildo Martínez Sabido (born 13 August 1937) is a Spanish gymnast. He competed in six events at the 1960 Summer Olympics.
