= Kacem Klifa =

Moroccan gymnast

- خليفة قاسم
- Born: 1940 (age 85–86) Casablanca, French protectorate in Morocco
- Height: 1.68 m (5 ft 6 in)

Gymnastics career
- Discipline: Men's artistic gymnastics
- Country represented: Morocco
- Gym: Difaa Casablanca

Kacem Klifa (born 1940) is a Moroccan gymnast. He competed in four events at the 1960 Summer Olympics.
