= René Marteaux =

Belgian gymnast (born 1929)

- Born: 3 August 1929 Saint-Gilles, Belgium

Gymnastics career
- Discipline: Men's artistic gymnastics
- Country represented: Belgium

René Marteaux (born 3 August 1929) is a Belgian gymnast. He competed in seven events at the 1960 Summer Olympics.
