= Léopold De Smet =

Belgian gymnast (born 1935)

- Born: 15 July 1935 (age 91) Brussels, Belgium

Gymnastics career
- Discipline: Men's artistic gymnastics
- Country represented: Belgium

Léopold De Smet (born 15 July 1935) is a Belgian gymnast. He competed in seven events at the 1960 Summer Olympics.
