= Kim Sang-guk =

South Korean gymnast

- 김상국
- Alternative name: Kim Sang-kook
- Born: 1 December 1934 (age 91) Keijō, Chōsen, Empire of Japan
- Height: 1.69 m (5 ft 7 in)

Gymnastics career
- Discipline: Men's artistic gymnastics
- Country represented: South Korea

Kim Sang-guk (born 1 December 1934) is a South Korean gymnast. He competed in seven events at the 1960 Summer Olympics.
