= André Brüllmann =

Swiss gymnast

- Born: 7 August 1934 (age 92) Geneva, Switzerland
- Height: 1.64 m (5 ft 5 in)

Gymnastics career
- Discipline: Men's artistic gymnastics
- Country represented: Switzerland

André Brüllmann (born 7 August 1934) is a Swiss gymnast. He competed in eight events at the 1960 Summer Olympics.
