= Sakari Olkkonen =

Finnish gymnast

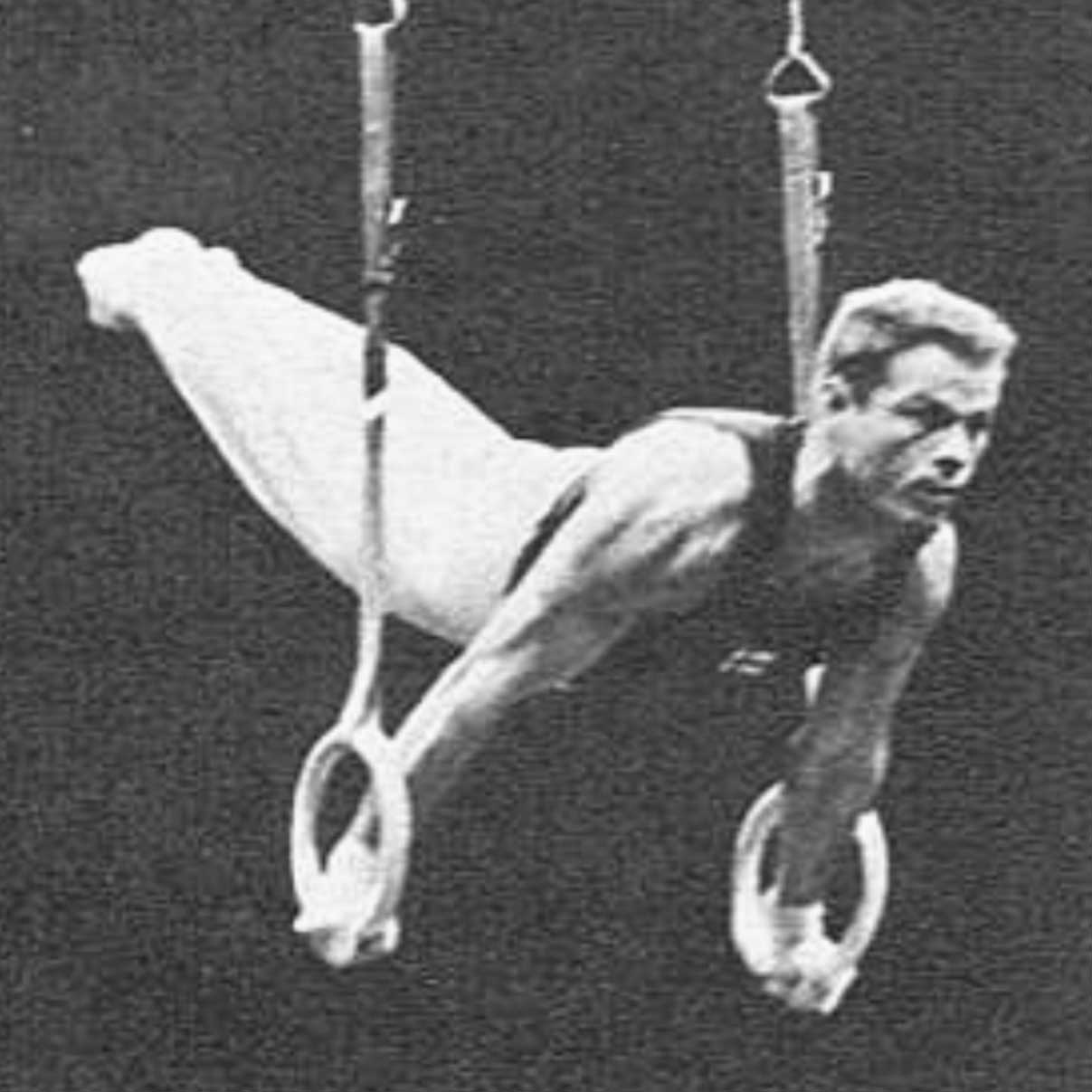
- Olkkonen in 1960

Personal information
- Full name: Sakari Eino Elias Olkkonen
- Born: 15 January 1931 Viipuri, Finland
- Died: 15 January 2002 (aged 71)

Gymnastics career
- Discipline: Men's artistic gymnastics
- Country represented: Finland

Sakari Eino Elias Olkkonen (15 January 1931 – 15 January 2002) was a Finnish gymnast. He competed in eight events at the 1960 Summer Olympics.
