= Abdel Vares Sharraf =

Egyptian gymnast

- عبدالوارث شرف
- Born: 1934 (age 91–92) Cairo, Kingdom of Egypt

Gymnastics career
- Discipline: Men's artistic gymnastics
- Country represented: Egypt
- Former countries represented: United Arab Republic
Medal record
Men's artistic gymnastics
| Event | 1st | 2nd | 3rd |
|---|---|---|---|
| Mediterranean Games | 3 | 1 | 1 |
| Total | 3 | 1 | 1 |
Representing Egypt
Mediterranean Games
| Gold medal – first place | 1963 Napoli | Rings |
| Silver medal – second place | 1955 Barcelona | Rings |
| Bronze medal – third place | 1955 Barcelona | Team |
Representing United Arab Republic
Mediterranean Games
| Gold medal – first place | 1959 Beirut | Team |
| Gold medal – first place | 1959 Beirut | Rings |

Abdel Vares Sharraf (born 1934) is an Egyptian gymnast. He competed in eight events at the 1960 Summer Olympics.
