= Johann König (gymnast) =

Austrian gymnast (1932–2020)

- Born: 26 September 1932 Bregenz, Austria
- Died: 2020 (aged 87–88)

Gymnastics career
- Discipline: Men's artistic gymnastics
- Country represented: Austria

Johann König (21 September 1932 – 2020) was an Austrian gymnast. He competed in eight events at the 1960 Summer Olympics. König died in 2020.
