= Jaime Belenguer =

Spanish gymnast

- Full name: Jaime Belenguer Hervás
- Born: 23 June 1937 (age 89) Valencia, Spain

Gymnastics career
- Discipline: Men's artistic gymnastics
- Country represented: Spain

Jaime Belenguer Hervás (born 23 June 1937) is a Spanish gymnast. He competed in eight events at the 1960 Summer Olympics.
