= Ahmed Fellat =

Moroccan gymnast (born 1929)

- أحمد فلت
- Born: 1929 Rabat, French protectorate in Morocco
- Height: 1.66 m (5 ft 5 in)

Gymnastics career
- Discipline: Men's artistic gymnastics
- Country represented: Morocco
- Club: Le Fath Union Sport de Rabat

Ahmed Fellat (born 1929) is a Moroccan gymnast. He competed in eight events at the 1960 Summer Olympics.
