= Michel Kiesgen =

Luxembourgish gymnast (born 1933)

- Born: 15 September 1933 (age 92) Luxembourg City, Luxembourg
- Height: 1.71 m (5 ft 7 in)

Gymnastics career
- Discipline: Men's artistic gymnastics
- Country represented: Luxembourg

Michel Kiesgen (born 15 September 1933) is a Luxembourgish gymnast. He competed in eight events at the 1960 Summer Olympics.
