= János Mester =

Hungarian gymnast

- Born: 8 February 1938 (age 88) Budapest, Kingdom of Hungary
- Height: 1.80 m (5 ft 11 in)

Gymnastics career
- Discipline: Men's artistic gymnastics
- Country represented: Hungary
- Club: Budapesti Postás Sportegyesület

János Mester (born 8 February 1938) is a Hungarian gymnast. He competed in eight events at the 1960 Summer Olympics.
