= Enrique Montserrat =

Spanish gymnast

- Full name: Enrique Montserrat Foj
- Alternative name: Enric Montserrat i Foj
- Born: 19 September 1935 Barcelona, Spain
- Died: 6 January 2022 (aged 86) Barcelona, Spain

Gymnastics career
- Discipline: Men's artistic gymnastics
- Country represented: Spain

Enrique Montserrat Foj (19 September 1935 – 6 January 2022) was a Spanish gymnast. He competed in eight events at the 1960 Summer Olympics. Montserrat died on 06.01.2022.
