= Hermann Klien =

Austrian gymnast (born 1932)

- Born: 22 October 1932 (age 93)

Gymnastics career
- Discipline: Men's artistic gymnastics
- Country represented: Austria

Hermann Klien (born 22 October 1932) is an Austrian gymnast. He competed in eight events at the 1960 Summer Olympics.
