= Ahmed Ghonaim =

Egyptian gymnast

- احمد حسين احمد غنيم
- Goneim in 1976

Personal information
- Full name: Ahmed Hussain Ahmed Ghonaim
- Born: 17 July 1937 (age 89) Cairo, Kingdom of Egypt

Gymnastics career
- Discipline: Men's artistic gymnastics
- Country represented: United Arab Republic
Medal record
Men's artistic gymnastics
Representing United Arab Republic
Mediterranean Games
| Gold medal – first place | 1959 Beirut | Team |
| Gold medal – first place | 1959 Beirut | Parallel bars |
| Silver medal – second place | 1959 Beirut | Floor |
| Silver medal – second place | 1959 Beirut | Rings |
| Silver medal – second place | 1959 Beirut | Vault |
| Bronze medal – third place | 1959 Beirut | All-around |

Ahmed Hussain Ahmed Ghonaim (born 1937) is an Egyptian gymnast. He competed in eight events at the 1960 Summer Olympics. He had previously won five medals at the 1959 Mediterranean Games. After the games, he joined a Russian-operated circus, first in Cairo and then in Lebanon. To avoid the Lebanese Civil War, he went to Saudi Arabia, where his promotion of gymnastics in the country—in which it had, to that point, been virtually unknown—led to him being considered "the founder of the sport of gymnastics in Saudi Arabia."
