= Mohamed Sekkat =

Moroccan gymnast

- محمد سقاط
- Born: 1937 Fez, French protectorate in Morocco
- Height: 1.70 m (5 ft 7 in)

Gymnastics career
- Discipline: Men's artistic gymnastics
- Country represented: Morocco
- Gym: Difaa Casablanca

Mohamed Sekkat (born 1937) is a Moroccan gymnast. He competed in eight events at the 1960 Summer Olympics.
