= Abdesselem Regragui =

Moroccan gymnast

- عبد السلام ركراكي
- Born: 1939 (age 86–87) Rabat, French protectorate in Morocco
- Height: 1.69 m (5 ft 7 in)

Gymnastics career
- Discipline: Men's artistic gymnastics
- Country represented: Morocco
- Gym: Difaa Fès

Abdesselem Regragui (born 1939) is a Moroccan gymnast. He competed in eight events at the 1960 Summer Olympics.
