= Anton Hertl =

Austrian gymnast (1921–2001)

- Born: 12 May 1921 Graz, Austria
- Died: 10 September 2001 (aged 80) Graz, Austria
- Height: 169 cm (5 ft 7 in)

Gymnastics career
- Discipline: Men's artistic gymnastics
- Country represented: Austria

Anton Hertl (12 May 1921 – 10 September 2001) was an Austrian gymnast. He competed in eight events at the 1960 Summer Olympics.
