= Ramón García (gymnast) =

Spanish gymnast

- Full name: Ramón García Pascual
- Born: 14 February 1940 (age 86) Madrid, Spain

Gymnastics career
- Discipline: Men's artistic gymnastics
- Country represented: Spain

Ramón García Pascual (born 14 February 1940) is a Spanish gymnast. He competed in eight events at the 1960 Summer Olympics.
