= Józef Rajnisz =

Polish gymnast

- Born: 3 March 1932 (age 94) Beuthen, Weimar Republic
- Height: 1.66 m (5 ft 5 in)

Gymnastics career
- Discipline: Men's artistic gymnastics
- Country represented: Poland
- Club: Górnik Zabrze

Józef Rajnisz (born 3 March 1932) is a Polish gymnast. He competed in eight events at the 1960 Summer Olympics.
