= Miloud M'Sellek =

Moroccan gymnast

- ميلود امسلك
- Born: 1937 (age 88–89) Casablanca, French protectorate in Morocco
- Height: 1.72 m (5 ft 8 in)

Gymnastics career
- Discipline: Men's artistic gymnastics
- Country represented: Morocco
- Gym: Difaa Casablanca

Miloud M'Sellek (born 1937) is a Moroccan gymnast. He competed in eight events at the 1960 Summer Olympics.
