= Bo Wirhed =

Swedish gymnast

- Full name: Bo Håkan Wirhed
- Born: 11 November 1935 (age 90) Hedemora, Sweden
- Height: 1.73 m (5 ft 8 in)

Gymnastics career
- Discipline: Men's artistic gymnastics
- Country represented: Sweden
- Gym: Arbetarnas Gymnastikförening

Bo Håkan Wirhed (born 11 November 1935) is a Swedish gymnast. He competed in eight events at the 1960 Summer Olympics.
