= Luis Valbuena (gymnast) =

Spanish gymnast (born 1936)

- Full name: Luis Valbuena García
- Born: 26 January 1936 (age 90) Barcelona, Spain

Gymnastics career
- Discipline: Men's artistic gymnastics
- Country represented: Spain
- Gym: G. Alsina

Luis Valbuena García (born 26 January 1936) is a Spanish gymnast. He competed in eight events at the 1960 Summer Olympics.
