= Milenko Lekić =

Serbian gymnast (born 1936)

- Born: 5 April 1936 (age 90) Subotica, Kingdom of Yugoslavia
- Height: 1.70 m (5 ft 7 in)

Gymnastics career
- Discipline: Men's artistic gymnastics
- Country represented: (Socialist Federal Republic of Yugoslavia) Yugoslavia

Milenko Lekić (born 5 April 1936) is a Serbian gymnast. He competed in eight events at the 1960 Summer Olympics.
