= Darif Tanjaoui =

Moroccan gymnast

- احمد ضريف طنجاوي
- Full name: Ahmed Darif Tanjaoui
- Born: 1939 (age 86–87) Casablanca, French protectorate in Morocco
- Height: 1.69 m (5 ft 7 in)

Gymnastics career
- Discipline: Men's artistic gymnastics
- Country represented: Morocco
- Gym: Difaa Casablanca

Ahmed Darif Tanjaoui (born 1939) is a Moroccan gymnast. He competed in eight events at the 1960 Summer Olympics.
