= Edy Thomi =

Swiss gymnast (born 1929)

- Full name: Eduard Thomi
- Born: 9 June 1929 Brig, Switzerland
- Height: 1.69 m (5 ft 7 in)

Gymnastics career
- Discipline: Men's artistic gymnastics
- Country represented: Switzerland

Eduard Thomi (born 9 June 1929) was a Swiss gymnast. He competed in eight events at the 1960 Summer Olympics.
