= Rudolf Keszthelyi =

Hungarian gymnast (1935–2024)

- Born: 29 March 1935 Pécs, Kingdom of Hungary
- Died: 6 May 2024 (aged 89)
- Height: 1.63 m (5 ft 4 in)

Gymnastics career
- Discipline: Men's artistic gymnastics
- Country represented: Hungary
- Club: Budapesti Honvéd Sportegyesület

Rudolf Keszthelyi (29 March 1935 – May 2024) was a Hungarian gymnast. He competed in eight events at the 1960 Summer Olympics. Keszthelyi died in May 2024, at the age of 89.
