= Alojz Petrovič =

Croatian gymnast (born 1936)

- Алојз Петрович
- Born: 12 May 1936 (age 90) Čepin, Kingdom of Yugoslavia

Gymnastics career
- Discipline: Men's artistic gymnastics
- Country represented: (Socialist Federal Republic of Yugoslavia) Yugoslavia

Alojz Petrovič (born 12 May 1936) is a Croatian gymnast. He competed at the 1960 Summer Olympics and the 1964 Summer Olympics.
