= Leif Korn =

Swedish gymnast

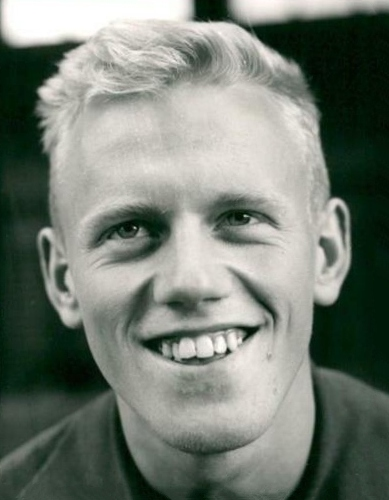
- Korn c. 1960s

Personal information
- Full name: Leif Johan Korn
- Born: 26 July 1937 (age 89) Stockholm, Sweden
- Height: 1.68 m (5 ft 6 in)

Gymnastics career
- Discipline: Men's artistic gymnastics
- Country represented: Sweden
- Club: Stockholms Gymnastikförening

Leif Johan Korn (born 26 July 1937) is a retired Swedish gymnast. He competed in all gymnastics events at the 1960 and the 1964 Summer Olympics with the best result of ninth place on the rings in 1964.

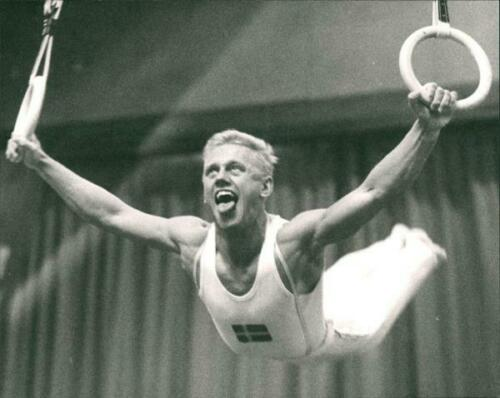
Korn in 1960
