= Kauko Heikkinen =

Finnish gymnast

- Full name: Kauko Pertti Juhani Heikkinen
- Born: 3 March 1938 (age 88) Pielisjärvi, Finland

Gymnastics career
- Discipline: Men's artistic gymnastics
- Country represented: Finland

Kauko Pertti Juhani Heikkinen (born 3 March 1938) is a Finnish gymnast. He competed at the 1960 Summer Olympics and the 1964 Summer Olympics.
