= Ismail Abdallah =

Egyptian gymnast (born 1933)

- اسماعيل عبد الله
- Born: 1933 (age 92–93) Cairo, Kingdom of Egypt

Gymnastics career
- Discipline: Men's artistic gymnastics
- Country represented: United Arab Republic
- Former countries represented: Egypt
Medal record
Men's artistic gymnastics
Event	1st	2nd	3rd
Mediterranean Games	2	2	3
Total	2	2	3
Representing Egypt
Mediterranean Games
Silver medal – second place	1955 Barcelona	Horizontal bar
Bronze medal – third place	1955 Barcelona	Team
Representing United Arab Republic
Mediterranean Games
Gold medal – first place	1959 Beirut	Team
Gold medal – first place	1959 Beirut	Horizontal bar
Silver medal – second place	1959 Beirut	All-around
Bronze medal – third place	1959 Beirut	Rings
Bronze medal – third place	1959 Beirut	Parallel bars

Ismail Abdallah (born 1933) is an Egyptian gymnast. He competed in the 1960 Summer Olympics.
