= Stig Lindewall =

Swedish gymnast

- Full name: Stig Lennart Lindewall
- Born: 15 August 1936 Adelsö, Sweden
- Died: 12 May 2024 (aged 87) Västerås, Sweden
- Height: 1.67 m (5 ft 6 in)

Gymnastics career
- Discipline: Men's artistic gymnastics
- Country represented: Sweden
- Club: Stockholms Gymnastikförening

Stig Lennart Lindewall (15 August 1936 – 12 May 2024) was a Swedish gymnast. He competed at the 1960 Summer Olympics and the 1964 Summer Olympics. Lindewall died in Västerås on 12 May 2024.
