= Gymnastics at the 1960 Summer Olympics =

Gymnastics at the Games of the XVII Olympiad
- Venue: Baths of Caracalla
- Dates: 5 September – 10 September 1960

At the 1960 Summer Olympics, fourteen different artistic gymnastics events were contested, eight for men and six for women. All events were held in the Baths of Caracalla in Rome from September 5 through 10th.

== Format of competition ==
The scoring in the team competition and in the all-around was the same, as for gymnastics events at the previous Olympics (there was no team, portable apparatus event, however). But apart from two performances:a compulsory and an optional, which counted for both the team competition and the all-around, a gymnast, who competed in an apparatus final should show one's skills once more on the respective apparatus. For the final score ("Total" column in tables below), the compulsory routine's mark was added to the optional routine's, the result was divided by two ("Prelim" column) and added to the third routine's mark ("Final" column).

== Results ==
=== Men's events ===
Games	Gold	Silver	Bronze
Individual all-around	Boris Shakhlin; Soviet Union	Takashi Ono; Japan	Yuri Titov; Soviet Union
Team all-around	Japan; Nobuyuki Aihara; Yukio Endō; Takashi Mitsukuri; Takashi Ono; Masao Takemoto; Shuji Tsurumi	Soviet Union; Albert Azaryan; Valery Kerdemilidi; Nikolai Miligulo; Vladimir Portnoi; Boris Shakhlin; Yuri Titov	Italy; Giovanni Carminucci; Pasquale Carminucci; Gianfranco Marzolla; Franco Menichelli; Orlando Polmonari; Angelo Vicardi
Floor exercise	Nobuyuki Aihara; Japan	Yuri Titov; Soviet Union	Franco Menichelli; Italy
Horizontal bar	Takashi Ono; Japan	Masao Takemoto; Japan	Boris Shakhlin; Soviet Union
Parallel bars	Boris Shakhlin; Soviet Union	Giovanni Carminucci; Italy	Takashi Ono; Japan
Pommel horse	Eugen Ekman; Finland	none awarded	Shuji Tsurumi; Japan
Pommel horse	Boris Shakhlin; Soviet Union	none awarded	Shuji Tsurumi; Japan
Rings	Albert Asaryan; Soviet Union	Boris Shakhlin; Soviet Union	Takashi Ono; Japan
Rings	Albert Asaryan; Soviet Union	Boris Shakhlin; Soviet Union	Velik Kapsazov; Bulgaria
Vault	Boris Shakhlin; Soviet Union	none awarded	Vladimir Portnoi; Soviet Union
Vault	Takashi Ono; Japan	none awarded	Vladimir Portnoi; Soviet Union

=== Women's events ===
Games	Gold	Silver	Bronze
Individual all-around	Larisa Latynina; Soviet Union	Sofia Muratova; Soviet Union	Polina Astakhova; Soviet Union
Team all-around	Soviet Union; Polina Astakhova; Lidia Ivanova; Larisa Latynina; Tamara Lyukhina; Sofia Muratova; Margarita Nikolaeva	Czechoslovakia; Eva Bosáková; Věra Čáslavská; Matylda Matoušková; Hana Růžičková; Ludmila Švédová; Adolfína Tkačíková	Romania; Atanasia Ionescu; Sonia Iovan; Elena Leușteanu; Emilia Vătășoiu-Liță; Elena Niculescu; Uta Poreceanu
Balance beam	Eva Bosáková; Czechoslovakia	Larisa Latynina; Soviet Union	Sofia Muratova; Soviet Union
Floor exercise	Larisa Latynina; Soviet Union	Polina Astakhova; Soviet Union	Tamara Lyukhina; Soviet Union
Uneven bars	Polina Astakhova; Soviet Union	Larisa Latynina; Soviet Union	Tamara Lyukhina; Soviet Union
Vault	Margarita Nikolaeva; Soviet Union	Sofia Muratova; Soviet Union	Larisa Latynina; Soviet Union

== Medal table ==
=== Total ===
Rank	Nation	Gold	Silver	Bronze	Total
1	Soviet Union	10	8	8	26
2	Japan	4	2	3	9
3	Czechoslovakia	1	1	0	2
4	Finland	1	0	0	1
5	Italy	0	1	2	3
6	Bulgaria	0	0	1	1
6	Romania	0	0	1	1
Totals (7 entries)		16	12	15	43

=== Men ===
Rank	Nation	Gold	Silver	Bronze	Total
1	Soviet Union	5	3	3	11
2	Japan	4	2	3	9
3	Finland	1	0	0	1
4	Italy	0	1	2	3
5	Bulgaria	0	0	1	1
Totals (5 entries)		10	6	9	25

=== Women ===
Rank	Nation	Gold	Silver	Bronze	Total
1	Soviet Union	5	5	5	15
2	Czechoslovakia	1	1	0	2
3	Romania	0	0	1	1
Totals (3 entries)		6	6	6	18

== Participating nations ==
- Argentina (1)
- Australia (4)
- Austria (12)
- Belgium (5)
- Bulgaria (12)
- Canada (3)
- Cuba (2)
- Czechoslovakia (12)
- Finland (12)
- France (12)
- United Team of Germany (12)
- Great Britain (12)
- Hungary (12)
- Israel (3)
- Italy (12)
- Japan (12)
- South Korea (2)
- Luxembourg (8)
- Mexico (1)
- Morocco (6)
- Netherlands (6)
- Norway (1)
- Poland (12)
- Portugal (4)
- Romania (6)
- South Africa (1)
- Soviet Union (12)
- Spain (12)
- Sweden (12)
- Switzerland (6)
- United Arab Republic (6)
- United States (12)
- Yugoslavia (9)
