= European Artistic Gymnastics Championships – Men's vault =

Men's vault has been staged at every European Men's Artistic Gymnastics Championships since 1955.

== Medalists ==
Year	Location	Gold	Silver	Bronze
1955	(West Germany) Frankfurt	Adalbert Dickhut (GER)	Helmut Bantz (GER)	Josy Stoffel (LUX)
1957	(France) Paris	Yuri Titov (URS)	Rajmund Csányi (HUN)	William Thoresson (SWE)
1959	(Denmark) Copenhagen	Yuri Titov (URS); William Thoresson (SWE)	none awarded	Ernst Fivian (SUI)
1961	Luxembourg	Giovanni Carminucci (ITA)	Franco Menichelli (ITA)	Miroslav Cerar (YUG); Ernst Fivian (SUI); William Thoresson (SWE)
1963	(Socialist Federal Republic of Yugoslavia) Belgrade	Přemysl Krbec (TCH)	Miroslav Cerar (YUG)	Martin Šrot (YUG); Valery Kerdemelidi (URS)
1965	(Belgium) Antwerp	Viktor Lisitsky (URS)	Georgi Adamov (BUL); Raimo Heinonen (FIN); Åge Storhaug (NOR)	none awarded
1967	(Finland) Tampere	Viktor Lisitsky (URS)	Georgi Adamov (BUL)	Gerhard Dietrich (GDR)
1969	(Poland) Varsovie	Viktor Klimenko (URS)	Nikolai Kubica (POL); Mikhail Voronin (URS)	none awarded
1971	(Spain) Madrid	Nikolai Andrianov (URS)	Andrzej Szajna (POL)	Klaus Köste (GDR)
1973	(France) Grenoble	Nikolai Andrianov (URS)	Andrzej Szajna (POL)	Imre Molnár (HUN)
1975	(Switzerland) Bern	Nikolai Andrianov (URS)	Andrzej Szajna (POL)	Jiří Tabák (TCH)
1977	(Soviet Union) Vilna	Jiří Tabák (TCH); Ralph Barthel (GDR)	none awarded	Vladimir Markelov (URS)
1979	(West Germany) Essen	Bohdan Makuts (URS)	Jozef Konečný (TCH)	Stoyan Deltchev (BUL); Ralph Barthel (GDR)
1981	(Italy) Rome	Bohdan Makuts (URS)	Yuri Korolyov (URS)	Rocco Amboni (ITA)
1983	(Bulgaria) Varna	Dmitry Bilozerchev (URS)	Hubert Brylok (GDR)	Yuri Korolyov (URS)
1985	(Norway) Oslo	Sylvio Kroll (GDR)	Dmitry Bilozerchev (URS)	Albert Haschar (FRG); Zsolt Borkai (HUN)
1987	(Soviet Union) Moscow	Yuri Korolyov (URS)	Sylvio Kroll (GDR)	Valeri Liukin (URS); Holger Behrendt (GDR)
1989	(Sweden) Stockholm	Valentin Mogilny (URS)	Gyula Takacs (HUN)	Marius Gherman (ROU)
1990	(Switzerland) Lausanne	Vitaly Scherbo (URS)	Ralf Büchner (GDR)	Neil Thomas (GBR)
1992	(Hungary) Budapest	Vitaly Scherbo (BLR)	Ihor Korobchynskyi (UKR)	Zoltán Supola (HUN)
1994	(Czech Republic) Prague	Vitaly Scherbo (BLR)	Cristian Leric (ROM)	Magnus Rosengren (SWE)
1996	(Denmark) Broendby	Vitaly Scherbo (BLR)	Dieter Rehm (SUI)	Cristian Leric (ROM)
1998	(Russia) Saint Petersburg	Ioannis Melissanidis (GRE)	Leszek Blanik (POL)	Dieter Rehm (SUI)
2000	(Germany) Bremen	Ioan Silviu Suciu (ROU)	Dimitri Karbanenko (FRA)	Alexander Svetlitchni (UKR)
2002	(Greece) Patras	Dmitry Kasperovich (BLR); Marian Drăgulescu (ROU)	none awarded	Kanukai Jackson (GBR)
2004	(Slovenia) Ljubljana	Marian Drăgulescu (ROU)	Jevgēņijs Saproņenko (LAT)	Leszek Blanik (POL)
2005	(Hungary) Debrecen	Jevgēņijs Saproņenko (LAT)	Filip Yanev (BUL)	Răzvan Șelariu (ROU); Jeffrey Wammes (NED)
2006	(Greece) Volos	Marian Drăgulescu (ROU)	Alin Jivan (ROU)	Raphael Wignanitz (FRA)
2007	(Netherlands) Amsterdam	Anton Golotsutskov (RUS)	Raphael Wignanitz (FRA)	Jeffrey Wammes (NED)
2008	(Switzerland) Lausanne	Leszek Blanik (POL)	Dmitry Kasperovich (BLR)	Ilie Daniel Popescu (ROU)
2009	(Italy) Milan	Thomas Bouhail (FRA)	Flavius Koczi (ROU)	Matthias Fahrig (GER)
2010	(United Kingdom) Birmingham	Tomi Tuuha (FIN)	Matthias Fahrig (GER)	Flavius Koczi (ROU)
2011	(Germany) Berlin	Thomas Bouhail (FRA)	Samir Aït Saïd (FRA)	Anton Golotsutskov (RUS)
2012	(France) Montpellier	Flavius Koczi (ROU)	Igor Radivilov (UKR)	Denis Ablyazin (RUS)
2013	(Russia) Moscow	Denis Ablyazin (RUS)	Flavius Koczi (ROU)	Artur Davtyan (ARM)
2014	(Bulgaria) Sofia	Denis Ablyazin (RUS)	Igor Radivilov (UKR)	Oleg Verniaiev (UKR)
2015	(France) Montpellier	Nikita Nagornyy (RUS)	Denis Ablyazin (RUS); Igor Radivilov (UKR)	none awarded
2016	(Switzerland) Bern	Oleg Verniaiev (UKR)	Artur Davtyan (ARM); Marian Drăgulescu (ROU)	none awarded
2017	(Romania) Cluj-Napoca	Artur Dalaloyan (RUS)	Marian Drăgulescu (ROU)	Oleg Verniaiev (UKR)
2018	(United Kingdom) Glasgow	Artur Dalaloyan (RUS)	Igor Radivilov (UKR)	Dmitriy Lankin (RUS)
2019	(Poland) Szczecin	Denis Ablyazin (RUS)	Andrey Medvedev (ISR)	Artur Dalaloyan (RUS)
2020	(Turkey) Mersin	Igor Radivilov (UKR)	Yahor Sharamkou (BLR)	Artem Dolgopyat (ISR)
2021	(Switzerland) Basel	Igor Radivilov (UKR)	Andrey Medvedev (ISR)	Giarnni Regini-Moran (GBR)
2022	(Germany) Munich	Jake Jarman (GBR)	Artur Davtyan (ARM)	Igor Radivilov (UKR)
2023	(Turkey) Antalya	Artur Davtyan (ARM)	Jake Jarman (GBR)	Igor Radivilov (UKR)
2024	(Italy) Rimini	Jake Jarman (GBR)	Artur Davtyan (ARM)	Nazar Chepurnyi (UKR)
2025	(Germany) Leipzig	Artur Davtyan (ARM)	Jake Jarman (GBR)	Nazar Chepurnyi (UKR)
2026	(Croatia) Zagreb	Nazar Chepurnyi (UKR)	Aleksei Usachev	Sol Scott (GBR)

== Medal table ==
Rank	Nation	Gold	Silver	Bronze	Total
1	Soviet Union	14	3	4	21
2	Russia (RUS)	7	1	4	12
3	Romania (ROU)	5	6	5	16
4	Ukraine (UKR)	4	5	7	16
5	Belarus (BLR)	4	2	0	6
6	East Germany	2	3	4	9
7	Armenia (ARM)	2	3	1	6
7	France (FRA)	2	3	1	6
9	Great Britain (GBR)	2	2	4	8
10	Czechoslovakia	2	1	1	4
11	Poland (POL)	1	5	1	7
12	Germany (GER)	1	2	1	4
13	Italy (ITA)	1	1	1	3
14	Finland (FIN)	1	1	0	2
14	Latvia (LAT)	1	1	0	2
16	Sweden (SWE)	1	0	3	4
17	Greece (GRE)	1	0	0	1
18	Bulgaria (BUL)	0	3	1	4
19	Hungary (HUN)	0	2	3	5
20	Israel (ISR)	0	2	1	3
21	Switzerland (SUI)	0	1	3	4
22	Yugoslavia	0	1	2	3
23	Norway (NOR)	0	1	0	1
24	Netherlands (NED)	0	0	2	2
25	Luxembourg (LUX)	0	0	1	1
25	West Germany	0	0	1	1
Totals (26 entries)		51	49	51	151

Notes

- Does not include silver medal won in 2026 won by World Gymnastics 2, the designation under which Russian gymnasts were allowed to compete at those championships.
