= European Artistic Gymnastics Championships – Men's individual all-around =

The men's individual all-around at the European Men's Artistic Gymnastics Championships have been staged since 1955.

== Medalists ==
Year	Location	Gold	Silver	Bronze
1955	(West Germany) Frankfurt	Boris Shakhlin (URS)	Albert Azaryan (URS)	Helmut Bantz (FRG)
1957	(France) Paris	Joaquín Blume (ESP)	Yuri Titov (URS)	Max Benker (SUI)
1959	(Denmark) Copenhagen	Yuri Titov (URS)	Pavel Stolbov (URS)	Phillip Furst (FRG)
1961	Luxembourg	Miroslav Cerar (YUG)	Yuri Titov (URS)	Giovanni Carminucci (ITA)
1963	(Socialist Federal Republic of Yugoslavia) Belgrade	Miroslav Cerar (YUG)	Boris Shakhlin (URS)	Vladimir Kerdemilidi (URS)
1965	(Belgium) Antwerp	Franco Menichelli (ITA)	Viktor Lisitsky (URS)	Sergey Diomidov (URS)
1967	(Finland) Tampere	Mikhail Voronin (URS)	Viktor Lisitsky (URS)	Franco Menichelli (ITA)
1969	(Poland) Warsaw	Mikhail Voronin (URS)	Viktor Klimenko (URS)	Nikolai Kubica (POL)
1971	(Spain) Madrid	Viktor Klimenko (URS)	Mikhail Voronin (URS)	Nikolai Andrianov (URS)
1973	(France) Grenoble	Viktor Klimenko (URS)	Nikolai Andrianov (URS)	Klaus Köste (GDR)
1975	(Switzerland) Bern	Nikolai Andrianov (URS)	Eberhard Gienger (FRG)	Alexander Dityatin (URS)
1977	(Soviet Union) Vilnius	Vladimir Markelov (URS)	Aleksandr Tkachyov (URS)	Vladimir Tikhonov (URS)
1979	(West Germany) Essen	Stoyan Deltchev (BUL)	Bohdan Makuts (URS); Aleksandr Tkachyov (URS)	None awarded
1981	(Italy) Rome	Aleksandr Tkachyov (URS)	Yuri Korolyov (URS)	Bohdan Makuts (URS)
1983	(Bulgaria) Varna	Dmitry Bilozerchev (URS)	Yuri Korolyov (URS)	György Guczoghy (HUN)
1985	(Norway) Oslo	Dmitry Bilozerchev (URS)	Valentin Mogilny (URS)	Vladimir Gogoladze (URS)
1987	(Soviet Union) Moscow	Valeri Liukin (URS)	Yuri Korolyov (URS)	György Guczoghy (HUN)
1989	(Sweden) Stockholm	Ihor Korobchynskyi (URS)	Valentin Mogilny (URS)	Holger Behrendt (GDR)
1990	(Switzerland) Lausanne	Valentin Mogilny (URS)	Sergey Kharkov (URS)	Jury Chechi (ITA)
1992	(Hungary) Budapest	Ihor Korobchynskyi (CIS)	Zoltán Supola (HUN)	Vitaly Scherbo (CIS)
1994	(Czech Republic) Prague	Ivan Ivankov (BLR)	Ihor Korobchynskyi (UKR)	Yevgeniy Shabayev (RUS)
1996	(Denmark) Broendby	Ivan Ivankov (BLR)	Vitaly Scherbo (BLR)	Aleksey Voropayev (RUS)
1998	(Russia) Saint Petersburg	Alexei Bondarenko (RUS)	Dimitri Karbanenko (FRA)	Alexei Nemov (RUS)
2000	(Germany) Bremen	Oleksandr Beresch (UKR)	Ivan Ivankov (BLR)	Marian Drăgulescu (ROM)
2002	(Greece) Patras	Dan Potra (ROM)	Yordan Yovchev (BUL)	Alexei Bondarenko (RUS)
2004	(Slovenia) Ljubljana	Marian Drăgulescu (ROM)	Rafael Martínez (ESP)	Denis Savenkov (BLR)
2005	(Hungary) Debrecen	Rafael Martínez (ESP)	Răzvan Șelariu (ROU)	Denis Savenkov (BLR)
2007	(Netherlands) Amsterdam	Maksim Devyatovskiy (RUS)	Fabian Hambüchen (GER)	Yuri Ryazanov (RUS)
2009	(Italy) Milan	Fabian Hambüchen (GER)	Dan Keatings (GBR)	Yuri Ryazanov (RUS)
2011	(Germany) Berlin	Philipp Boy (GER)	Flavius Koczi (ROU)	Daniel Purvis (GBR); Nikolai Kuksenkov (UKR)
2013	(Russia) Moscow	David Belyavskiy (RUS)	Max Whitlock (GBR)	Oleg Verniaiev (UKR)
2015	(France) Montpellier	Oleg Verniaiev (UKR)	David Belyavskiy (RUS)	Daniel Purvis (GBR)
2017	(Romania) Cluj-Napoca	Oleg Verniaiev (UKR)	Artur Dalaloyan (RUS)	James Hall (GBR)
2019	(Poland) Szczecin	Nikita Nagornyy (RUS)	Artur Dalaloyan (RUS)	Marios Georgiou (CYP)
2021	(Switzerland) Basel	Nikita Nagornyy (RUS)	David Belyavskiy (RUS)	Illia Kovtun (UKR)
2022	(Germany) Munich	Joe Fraser (GBR)	Ahmet Önder (TUR)	Adem Asil (TUR)
2023	(Turkey) Antalya	Adem Asil (TUR)	Jake Jarman (GBR)	Illia Kovtun (UKR)
2024	(Italy) Rimini	Marios Georgiou (CYP)	Oleg Verniaiev (UKR)	Yumin Abbadini (ITA)
2025	(Germany) Leipzig	Adem Asil (TUR)	Léo Saladino (FRA)	Krisztofer Mészáros (HUN)
2026	(Croatia) Zagreb	Illia Kovtun (CRO)	Arsenii Dukhno	Daniel Marinov

== Medal table ==
Rank	Nation	Gold	Silver	Bronze	Total
1	Soviet Union	14	19	7	40
2	Russia (RUS)	5	4	6	15
3	Ukraine (UKR)	3	2	4	9
4	Belarus (BLR)	2	2	2	6
5	Romania (ROU)	2	2	1	5
6	Turkey (TUR)	2	1	1	4
7	Germany (GER)	2	1	0	3
7	Spain (ESP)	2	1	0	3
9	Yugoslavia	2	0	0	2
10	Great Britain (GBR)	1	3	3	7
11	Bulgaria (BUL)	1	1	0	2
12	Italy (ITA)	1	0	4	5
13	CIS	1	0	1	2
13	Cyprus (CYP)	1	0	1	2
15	Croatia (CRO)	1	0	0	1
16	France (FRA)	0	2	0	2
17	Hungary (HUN)	0	1	3	4
18	West Germany	0	1	2	3
19	East Germany	0	0	2	2
20	Poland (POL)	0	0	1	1
20	Switzerland (SUI)	0	0	1	1
Totals (21 entries)		40	40	39	119

Notes

- Does not include medals won in 2026 by World Gymnastics 2, the designation under which Russian gymnasts were allowed to compete at those championships.

== See also ==
- European Men's and Women's Artistic Gymnastics Individual Championships
- European Men's Artistic Gymnastics Championships
- World Artistic Gymnastics Championships
