= European Artistic Gymnastics Championships – Men's parallel bars =

Men's parallel bars has been staged at every European Men's Artistic Gymnastics Championships since 1955.

== Medalists ==
Year	Location	Gold	Silver	Bronze
1955	(West Germany) Frankfurt	Helmut Bantz; Germany Boris Shakhlin; Soviet Union Albert Azaryan; Soviet Union	none awarded	none awarded
1957	(France) Paris	Jack Günthard; Switzerland Joaquín Blume; Spain	none awarded	Max Benker; Switzerland
1959	(Denmark) Copenhagen	Yuri Titov; Soviet Union	Ferdinand Daniš; Czechoslovakia	Pavel Stolbov; Soviet Union
1961	Luxembourg	Miroslav Cerar; Yugoslavia	Viktor Leontyev; Soviet Union	Giovanni Carminucci; Italy Franco Menichelli; Italy
1963	(Socialist Federal Republic of Yugoslavia) Belgrade	Giovanni Carminucci; Italy	Boris Shakhlin; Soviet Union	Franco Menichelli; Italy
1965	(Belgium) Antwerp	Miroslav Cerar; Yugoslavia	Franco Menichelli; Italy	Sergey Diomidov; Soviet Union Erwin Koppe; East Germany
1967	(Finland) Tampere	Mikhail Voronin; Soviet Union	Franco Menichelli; Italy	Giovanni Carminucci; Italy
1969	(Poland) Varsovie	Mikhail Voronin; Soviet Union	Miroslav Cerar; Yugoslavia Viktor Klimenko; Soviet Union	none awarded
1971	(Spain) Madrid	Giovanni Carminucci; Italy	Nikolai Andrianov; Soviet Union Klaus Köste; East Germany Mikhail Voronin; Soviet Union	none awarded
1973	(France) Grenoble	Viktor Klimenko; Soviet Union	Nikolai Andrianov; Soviet Union Mauno Nissinen; Finland	none awarded
1975	(Switzerland) Bern	Nikolai Andrianov; Soviet Union	Alexander Dityatin; Soviet Union	Viktor Klimenko; Soviet Union
1977	(Soviet Union) Vilna	Vladimir Tikhonov; Soviet Union	Eberhard Gienger; West Germany Ralph Barthel; East Germany	none awarded
1979	(West Germany) Essen	Bohdan Makuts; Soviet Union	Alexander Dityatin; Soviet Union	Eberhard Gienger; West Germany Henri Boério; France
1981	(Italy) Rome	Bohdan Makuts; Soviet Union	Aleksandr Tkachyov; Soviet Union	Eberhard Gienger; West Germany Lutz Hoffmann; East Germany
1983	(Bulgaria) Varna	Yuri Korolyov; Soviet Union	Borislav Houtov; Bulgaria	György Guczoghy; Hungary
1985	(Norway) Oslo	Dmitry Bilozerchev; Soviet Union	Sylvio Kroll; East Germany	Vladimir Gogoladze; Soviet Union Ulf Hoffmann; East Germany
1987	(Soviet Union) Moscow	Valeri Liukin; Soviet Union	Holger Behrendt; East Germany	Maik Belle; East Germany Marian Rizan; Romania
1989	(Sweden) Stockholm	Kalofer Khristozov; Bulgaria	Andreas Wecker; East Germany	Valentin Mogilny; Soviet Union
1990	(Switzerland) Lausanne	Daniel Giubellini; Switzerland Valentin Mogilny; Soviet Union	none awarded	Kalofer Khristozov; Bulgaria Andre Hempel; East Germany
1992	(Hungary) Budapest	Zoltán Supola; Hungary	Rustam Sharipov; Ukraine Ihor Korobchynskyi; Ukraine Vitaly Scherbo; Belarus	none awarded
1994	(Czech Republic) Prague	Alexei Nemov; Russia Rustam Sharipov; Ukraine	none awarded	Yevgeny Shabayev; Russia Ihor Korobchynskyi; Ukraine
1996	(Denmark) Broendby	Vitaly Scherbo; Belarus Rustam Sharipov; Ukraine	none awarded	Ivan Ivankov; Belarus
1998	(Russia) Saint Petersburg	Alexei Bondarenko; Russia	Mitja Petkovšek; Slovenia	Andreu Vivó; Spain
2000	(Germany) Bremen	Mitja Petkovšek; Slovenia	Ivan Ivankov; Belarus	Alexei Bondarenko; Russia
2002	(Greece) Patras	Vasileios Tsolakidis; Greece	Mitja Petkovšek; Slovenia	Alexei Sinkevich; Belarus
2004	(Slovenia) Ljubljana	Roman Zozulya; Ukraine	Valeri Goncharov; Ukraine	Yann Cucherat; France
2005	(Hungary) Debrecen	Manuel Carballo; Spain	Yann Cucherat; France	Mitja Petkovšek; Slovenia
2006	(Greece) Volos	Mitja Petkovšek; Slovenia	Yann Cucherat; France	Ivan Ivankov; Belarus
2007	(Netherlands) Amsterdam	Mitja Petkovšek; Slovenia	Nikolai Kryukov; Russia	Epke Zonderland; Netherlands
2008	(Switzerland) Lausanne	Mitja Petkovšek; Slovenia	Yann Cucherat; France	Nikolai Kryukov; Russia
2009	(Italy) Milan	Yann Cucherat; France	Mitja Petkovšek; Slovenia	Fabian Hambüchen; Germany
2010	(United Kingdom) Birmingham	Yann Cucherat; France	Vasileios Tsolakidis; Greece	Adam Kierzkowski; Poland Hamilton Sabot; France
2011	(Germany) Berlin	Marcel Nguyen; Germany	Epke Zonderland; Netherlands	Vasileios Tsolakidis; Greece
2012	(France) Montpellier	Marcel Nguyen; Germany	Oleg Verniaiev; Ukraine	Mitja Petkovšek; Slovenia
2013	(Russia) Moscow	Oleg Stepko; Ukraine	Lucas Fischer; Switzerland	David Belyavskiy; Russia
2014	(Bulgaria) Sofia	Oleg Verniaiev; Ukraine	David Belyavskiy; Russia	Epke Zonderland; Netherlands
2015	(France) Montpellier	Oleg Verniaiev; Ukraine	Marius Berbecar; Romania Christian Baumann; Switzerland	none awarded
2016	(Switzerland) Bern	David Belyavskiy; Russia	Oleg Verniaiev; Ukraine	Marcel Nguyen; Germany
2017	(Romania) Cluj-Napoca	Oleg Verniaiev; Ukraine	Lukas Dauser; Germany	Nikita Nagornyy; Russia
2018	(United Kingdom) Glasgow	Artur Dalaloyan; Russia	David Belyavskiy; Russia	Oliver Hegi; Switzerland
2019	(Poland) Szczecin	Nikita Nagornyy; Russia	Petro Pakhnyuk; Ukraine	Ferhat Arıcan; Turkey
2020	(Turkey) Mersin	Ferhat Arıcan; Turkey	Petro Pakhnyuk; Ukraine	Robert Tvorogal; Lithuania
2021	(Switzerland) Basel	Ferhat Arıcan; Turkey	David Belyavskiy; Russia	Christian Baumann; Switzerland Lukas Dauser; Germany
2022	(Germany) Munich	Joe Fraser; Great Britain	Illia Kovtun; Ukraine	Giarnni Regini-Moran; Great Britain
2023	(Turkey) Antalya	Illia Kovtun; Ukraine	Ferhat Arıcan; Turkey	Thierno Diallo; Spain
2024	(Italy) Rimini	Illia Kovtun; Ukraine	Marios Georgiou; Cyprus	Noè Seifert; Switzerland
2025	(Germany) Leipzig	Nils Dunkel; Germany	Ian Raubal; Switzerland	Timo Eder; Germany
2026	(Croatia) Zagreb	Illia Kovtun; Croatia	Ferhat Arıcan; Turkey	Joe Fraser; Great Britain

== Medal table ==
Rank	Nation	Gold	Silver	Bronze	Total
1	Soviet Union	14	9	5	28
2	Ukraine (UKR)	9	8	1	18
3	Russia (RUS)	5	4	5	14
4	Slovenia (SLO)	4	3	2	9
5	Germany (GER)	4	1	4	9
6	Switzerland (SUI)	2	3	4	9
7	France (FRA)	2	3	3	8
8	Italy (ITA)	2	2	4	8
9	Turkey (TUR)	2	2	1	5
10	Yugoslavia	2	1	0	3
11	Spain (ESP)	2	0	2	4
12	Belarus (BLR)	1	2	3	6
13	Bulgaria (BUL)	1	1	1	3
13	Greece (GRE)	1	1	1	3
15	Great Britain (GBR)	1	0	2	3
16	Hungary (HUN)	1	0	1	2
17	Croatia (CRO)	1	0	0	1
18	East Germany	0	5	5	10
19	Netherlands (NED)	0	1	2	3
19	West Germany	0	1	2	3
21	Romania (ROU)	0	1	1	2
22	Cyprus (CYP)	0	1	0	1
22	Czechoslovakia	0	1	0	1
22	Finland (FIN)	0	1	0	1
25	Lithuania (LTU)	0	0	1	1
25	Poland (POL)	0	0	1	1
Totals (26 entries)		54	51	51	156
