= European Artistic Gymnastics Championships – Men's rings =

Men's rings has been staged at every European Men's Artistic Gymnastics Championships since 1955.

== Medalists ==
Year	Location	Gold	Silver	Bronze
1955	(West Germany) Frankfurt	Albert Azaryan (URS)	Helmut Bantz (GER); Vladimir Prorok (TCH); Boris Shakhlin (URS)	none awarded
1957	(France) Paris	Yuri Titov (URS); Joaquín Blume (ESP)	none awarded	Kalevi Suoniemi (FIN)
1959	(Denmark) Copenhagen	Yuri Titov (URS)	Pavel Stolbov (URS)	Velik Kapsazov (BUL)
1961	Luxembourg	Miroslav Cerar (YUG); Velik Kapsazov (BUL); Yuri Titov (URS)	none awarded	none awarded
1963	(Socialist Federal Republic of Yugoslavia) Belgrade	Miroslav Cerar (YUG); Velik Kapsazov (BUL); Boris Shakhlin (URS)	none awarded	none awarded
1965	(Belgium) Antwerp	Viktor Lisitsky (URS); Franco Menichelli (ITA)	none awarded	Miroslav Cerar (YUG)
1967	(Finland) Tampere	Mikhail Voronin (URS); Viktor Lisitsky (URS)	none awarded	Nikolai Kubica (POL)
1969	(Poland) Varsovie	Mikhail Voronin (URS)	Nikolai Kubica (POL); Viktor Klimenko (URS)	none awarded
1971	(Spain) Madrid	Mikhail Voronin (URS)	Nikolai Andrianov (URS)	Andrzej Szajna (POL)
1973	(France) Grenoble	Viktor Klimenko (URS)	Nikolai Andrianov (URS); Dan Grecu (ROM)	none awarded
1975	(Switzerland) Bern	Dan Grecu (ROM)	Mihai Borş (ROM)	Alexander Dityatin (URS)
1977	(Soviet Union) Vilna	Vladimir Markelov (URS)	Aleksandr Tkachyov (URS)	Vladimir Tikhonov (URS)
1979	(West Germany) Essen	Alexander Dityatin (URS)	Bohdan Makuts (URS)	Lutz Mack (GDR)
1981	(Italy) Rome	Yuri Korolyov (URS)	Rocco Amboni (ITA)	Aleksandr Tkachyov (URS)
1983	(Bulgaria) Varna	Dmitry Bilozerchev (URS); Plamen Petkov (BUL)		György Guczoghy (HUN); Sepp Zellweger (SUI); Levente Molnár (ROM)
1985	(Norway) Oslo	Dmitry Bilozerchev (URS)	Valentin Mogilny (URS)	Valentin Pîntea (ROM)
1987	(Soviet Union) Moscow	Valentin Mogilny (URS)	Valeri Liukin (URS)	Andreas Aguilar (FRG)
1989	(Sweden) Stockholm	Holger Behrendt (GDR)	Vitaliy Marinich (URS)	Andreas Aguilar (FRG)
1990	(Switzerland) Lausanne	Jury Chechi (ITA)	Jens Milbradt (GDR)	Szilveszter Csollány (HUN)
1992	(Hungary) Budapest	Jury Chechi (ITA)	Vitaly Scherbo (BLR)	Szilveszter Csollány (HUN)
1994	(Czech Republic) Prague	Jury Chechi (ITA)	Andreas Wecker (GER)	Szilveszter Csollány (HUN)
1996	(Denmark) Broendby	Jury Chechi (ITA)	Yordan Yovchev (BUL); Marius Tobă (GER)	none awarded
1998	(Russia) Saint Petersburg	Szilveszter Csollány (HUN)	Valery Belenky (GER)	Dimosthenis Tampakos (GRE)
2000	(Germany) Bremen	Dimosthenis Tampakos (GRE)	Szilveszter Csollány (HUN)	Ivan Ivankov (BLR)
2002	(Greece) Patras	Yordan Yovchev (BUL)	Dimosthenis Tampakos (GRE)	Szilveszter Csollány (HUN)
2004	(Slovenia) Ljubljana	Dimosthenis Tampakos (GRE); Aleksandr Safoshkin (RUS)	none awarded	Matteo Morandi (ITA)
2005	(Hungary) Debrecen	Andrea Coppolino (ITA); Yuri van Gelder (NED)	none awarded	Aleksandr Safoshkin (RUS)
2006	(Greece) Volos	Aleksandr Safoshkin (RUS)	Yordan Yovchev (BUL)	Andrea Coppolino (ITA)
2007	(Netherlands) Amsterdam	Oleksandr Vorobiov (UKR)	Yordan Yovchev (BUL); Andrea Coppolino (ITA)	
2008	(Switzerland) Lausanne	Yuri van Gelder (NED)	Yordan Yovchev (BUL)	Danny Pinheiro Rodrigues (FRA)
2009	(Italy) Milan	Yuri van Gelder (NED)	Oleksandr Vorobiov (UKR)	Yordan Yovchev (BUL)
2010	(United Kingdom) Birmingham	Matteo Morandi (ITA)	Samir Aït Saïd (FRA)	Yordan Yovchev (BUL)
2011	(Germany) Berlin	Konstantin Pluzhnikov (RUS)	Aleksandr Balandin (RUS)	Eleftherios Petrounias (GRE)
2012	(France) Montpellier	Aleksandr Balandin (RUS)	Matteo Morandi (ITA)	Denis Ablyazin (RUS)
2013	(Russia) Moscow	Samir Aït Saïd (FRA); Igor Radivilov (UKR)	none awarded	Danny Pinheiro Rodrigues (FRA); Matteo Morandi (ITA)
2014	(Bulgaria) Sofia	Denis Ablyazin (RUS); Aleksandr Balandin (RUS)	none awarded	Samir Aït Saïd (FRA)
2015	(France) Montpellier	Eleftherios Petrounias (GRE)	Denis Ablyazin (RUS); Samir Aït Saïd (FRA)	none awarded
2016	(Switzerland) Bern	Eleftherios Petrounias (GRE)	Denis Ablyazin (RUS); Vahagn Davtyan (ARM)	none awarded
2017	(Romania) Cluj-Napoca	Eleftherios Petrounias (GRE)	Courtney Tulloch (GBR)	Igor Radivilov (UKR)
2018	(United Kingdom) Glasgow	Eleftherios Petrounias (GRE)	İbrahim Çolak (TUR)	Courtney Tulloch (GBR)
2019	(Poland) Szczecin	Denis Ablyazin (RUS)	Marco Lodadio (ITA)	Vahagn Davtyan (ARM)
2020	(Turkey) Mersin	İbrahim Çolak (TUR)	Vinzenz Höck (AUT)	Igor Radivilov (UKR)
2021	(Switzerland) Basel	Eleftherios Petrounias (GRE)	Nikita Nagornyy (RUS)	Salvatore Maresca (ITA)
2022	(Germany) Munich	Eleftherios Petrounias (GRE)	Adem Asil (TUR)	Courtney Tulloch (GBR)
2023	(Turkey) Antalya	Adem Asil (TUR)	Vahagn Davtyan (ARM)	Eleftherios Petrounias (GRE)
2024	(Italy) Rimini	Eleftherios Petrounias (GRE)	Nikita Simonov (AZE)	Adem Asil (TUR)
2025	(Germany) Leipzig	Adem Asil (TUR) Eleftherios Petrounias (GRE)	none awarded	Artur Avetisyan (ARM)
2026	(Croatia) Zagreb	Artur Avetisyan (ARM)	Ilia Zaika	Eleftherios Petrounias (GRE)

== Medal table ==
Rank	Nation	Gold	Silver	Bronze	Total
1	Soviet Union	17	10	3	30
2	Greece (GRE)	10	1	4	15
3	Italy (ITA)	7	4	4	15
4	Russia (RUS)	7	4	2	13
5	Bulgaria (BUL)	4	4	3	11
6	Turkey (TUR)	3	2	1	6
7	Netherlands (NED)	3	0	0	3
8	Ukraine (UKR)	2	1	2	5
9	Yugoslavia	2	0	1	3
10	France (FRA)	1	2	3	6
11	Armenia (ARM)	1	2	2	5
12	Romania (ROU)	1	2	1	4
13	Hungary (HUN)	1	1	5	7
14	East Germany	1	1	1	3
15	Spain (ESP)	1	0	0	1
16	Germany (GER)	0	4	0	4
17	Great Britain (GBR)	0	1	2	3
17	Poland (POL)	0	1	2	3
19	Belarus (BLR)	0	1	1	2
20	Austria (AUT)	0	1	0	1
20	Azerbaijan (AZE)	0	1	0	1
20	Czechoslovakia	0	1	0	1
23	West Germany	0	0	2	2
24	Finland (FIN)	0	0	1	1
Totals (24 entries)		61	44	40	145

Notes

- Does not include silver medal won in 2026 won by World Gymnastics 2, the designation under which Russian gymnasts were allowed to compete at those championships.
