= European Artistic Gymnastics Championships – Men's pommel horse =

Men's pommel horse has been staged at every European Men's Artistic Gymnastics Championships since 1955.

== Medalists ==
| Year | Location | Gold | Silver | Bronze |
|---|---|---|---|---|
| 1955 | (West Germany) Frankfurt | Boris Shakhlin (URS) | Jan Cronstedt (SWE) | Hans Sauter (AUT) |
| 1957 | (France) Paris | Joaquín Blume (ESP) | Max Benker (SUI) | Ivan Čaklec (YUG) |
| 1959 | (Denmark) Copenhagen | Yuri Titov (URS) | Eugen Ekman (FIN) | Philipp Fürst (FRG) |
| 1961 | Luxembourg | Miroslav Cerar (YUG) | Philipp Fürst (FRG); Viktor Leontyev (URS) | none awarded |
| 1963 | (Socialist Federal Republic of Yugoslavia) Belgrade | Miroslav Cerar (YUG) | Vladimir Kerdemilidi (URS) | Boris Shakhlin (URS) |
| 1965 | (Belgium) Antwerp | Viktor Lisitsky (URS) | Miroslav Cerar (YUG) | Sergey Diomidov (URS); Olli Laiho (FIN) |
| 1967 | (Finland) Tampere | Mikhail Voronin (URS) | Miroslav Cerar (YUG) | Gerhard Dietrich (GDR) |
| 1969 | (Poland) Varsovie | Miroslav Cerar (YUG); Wilhelm Kubica (POL) | none awarded | Mikhail Voronin (URS) |
| 1971 | (Spain) Madrid | Nikolai Andrianov (URS) | Matthias Brehme (GDR) | Mikhail Voronin (URS) |
| 1973 | (France) Grenoble | Zoltán Magyar (HUN) | Wilhelm Kubica (POL) | Viktor Klimenko (URS) |
| 1975 | (Switzerland) Bern | Zoltán Magyar (HUN) | Nikolai Andrianov (URS) | Eberhard Gienger (FRG) |
| 1977 | (Soviet Union) Vilna | Zoltán Magyar (HUN) | Michael Nikolay (GDR) | Vladimir Markelov (URS) |
| 1979 | (West Germany) Essen | Alexander Dityatin (URS); György Guczoghy (HUN) | none awarded | Michel Boutard (FRA) |
| 1981 | (Italy) Rome | György Guczoghy (HUN) | Yuri Korolyov (URS); Kurt Szilier (ROM); Michel Boutard (FRA) | none awarded |
| 1983 | (Bulgaria) Varna | György Guczoghy (HUN) | Alexander Pogorelov (URS); Yuri Korolyov (URS) | none awarded |
| 1985 | (Norway) Oslo | Dmitry Bilozerchev (URS) | György Guczoghy (HUN); Sylvio Kroll (GDR) | none awarded |
| 1987 | (Soviet Union) Moscow | Valeri Liukin (URS) | Lubomir Geraskov (BUL) | Marian Rizan (ROM) |
| 1989 | (Sweden) Stockholm | Valentin Mogilny (URS) | Andreas Wecker (GDR) | Kalofer Khristozov (BUL) |
| 1990 | (Switzerland) Lausanne | Valentin Mogilny (URS) | Jens Milbradt (GDR) | Sergey Kharkov (URS) |
| 1992 | (Hungary) Budapest | Vitaly Scherbo (BLR) | Ihor Korobchynskyi (UKR) | Jury Chechi (ITA) |
| 1994 | (Czech Republic) Prague | Marius Urzică (ROM) | Éric Poujade (FRA) | Vitaly Marinich (UKR) |
| 1996 | (Denmark) Broendby | Li Donghua (SUI) | Ivan Ivanov (RUS) | Patrice Casimir (FRA) |
| 1998 | (Russia) Saint Petersburg | Éric Poujade (FRA) | Alexei Bondarenko (RUS) | Nikolai Krukov (RUS) |
| 2000 | (Germany) Bremen | Marius Urzică (ROU) | Éric Poujade (FRA) | Oleksandr Beresch (UKR) |
| 2002 | (Greece) Patras | Marius Urzică (ROU) | Ioan Silviu Suciu (ROU) | Alberto Busnari (ITA) |
| 2004 | (Slovenia) Ljubljana | Ioan Silviu Suciu (ROU) | Alberto Busnari (ITA) | Krisztián Berki (HUN) |
| 2005 | (Hungary) Debrecen | Krisztián Berki (HUN) | Marius Urzică (ROU) | Nikolai Kryukov (RUS) |
| 2006 | (Greece) Volos | Flavius Koczi (ROU) | Evgenij Spiridonov (GER) | Olexander Suprun (UKR) |
| 2007 | (Netherlands) Amsterdam | Krisztián Berki (HUN) | Dan Keatings (GBR) | Flavius Koczi (ROU) |
| 2008 | (Switzerland) Lausanne | Krisztián Berki (HUN) | Filip Ude (CRO) | Robert Seligman (CRO) |
| 2009 | (Italy) Milan | Krisztián Berki (HUN) | Louis Smith (GBR) | Dan Keatings (GBR) |
| 2010 | (United Kingdom) Birmingham | Dan Keatings (GBR) | Louis Smith (GBR) | Sašo Bertoncelj (SLO) |
| 2011 | (Germany) Berlin | Krisztián Berki (HUN) | Cyril Tommasone (FRA) | Harutyun Merdinyan (ARM) |
| 2012 | (France) Montpellier | Krisztián Berki (HUN) | Louis Smith (GBR) | Harutyun Merdinyan (ARM) |
| 2013 | (Russia) Moscow | Dan Keatings (GBR) | Krisztián Berki (HUN) | Max Whitlock (GBR) |
| 2014 | (Bulgaria) Sofia | Max Whitlock (GBR) | Krisztián Berki (HUN) | Sašo Bertoncelj (SLO) |
| 2015 | (France) Montpellier | Louis Smith (GBR) | Harutyun Merdinyan (ARM) | Alberto Busnari (ITA) |
| 2016 | (Switzerland) Bern | Harutyun Merdinyan (ARM) | David Belyavskiy (RUS) | Christian Baumann (SUI) |
| 2017 | (Romania) Cluj-Napoca | David Belyavskiy (RUS) | Krisztián Berki (HUN) | Harutyun Merdinyan (ARM) |
| 2018 | (United Kingdom) Glasgow | Rhys McClenaghan (IRL) | Robert Seligman (CRO); Sašo Bertoncelj (SLO) | none awarded |
| 2019 | (Poland) Szczecin | Max Whitlock (GBR) | Cyril Tommasone (FRA) | Vladislav Polyashov (RUS) |
| 2020 | (Turkey) Mersin | Matvei Petrov (ALB) | Filip Ude (CRO) | Ferhat Arıcan (TUR) |
| 2021 | (Switzerland) Basel | Artur Davtyan (ARM) | Nikita Nagornyy (RUS) | Joe Fraser (GBR) |
| 2022 | (Germany) Munich | Harutyun Merdinyan (ARM) | Loran de Munck (NED) | Nils Dunkel (GER) |
| 2023 | (Turkey) Antalya | Rhys McClenaghan (IRL) | Maxime Gentges (BEL) | Artur Davtyan (ARM) |
| 2024 | (Italy) Rimini | Rhys McClenaghan (IRL) | Loran de Munck (NED) | Marios Georgiou (CYP) |
| 2025 | (Germany) Leipzig | Hamlet Manukyan (ARM) | Mamikon Khachatryan (ARM) | Gabriele Targhetta (ITA) |
| 2026 | (Croatia) Zagreb | Gabriele Targhetta (ITA) | Hamlet Manukyan (ARM) | Mamikon Khachatryan (ARM) |

== Medal table ==
| Rank | Nation | Gold | Silver | Bronze | Total |
|---|---|---|---|---|---|
| 1 | Hungary (HUN) | 12 | 4 | 1 | 17 |
| 2 | Soviet Union | 10 | 6 | 7 | 23 |
| 3 | Great Britain (GBR) | 5 | 4 | 3 | 12 |
| 4 | Romania (ROU) | 5 | 3 | 2 | 10 |
| 5 | Armenia (ARM) | 4 | 3 | 5 | 12 |
| 6 | Yugoslavia | 3 | 2 | 1 | 6 |
| 7 | Ireland (IRL) | 3 | 0 | 0 | 3 |
| 8 | France (FRA) | 1 | 5 | 2 | 8 |
| 9 | Russia (RUS) | 1 | 4 | 3 | 8 |
| 10 | Italy (ITA) | 1 | 1 | 4 | 6 |
| 11 | Switzerland (SUI) | 1 | 1 | 1 | 3 |
| 12 | Poland (POL) | 1 | 1 | 0 | 2 |
| 13 | Albania (ALB) | 1 | 0 | 0 | 1 |
| 13 | Belarus (BLR) | 1 | 0 | 0 | 1 |
| 13 | Spain (ESP) | 1 | 0 | 0 | 1 |
| 16 | East Germany | 0 | 5 | 1 | 6 |
| 17 | Croatia (CRO) | 0 | 3 | 1 | 4 |
| 18 | Netherlands (NED) | 0 | 2 | 0 | 2 |
| 19 | Ukraine (UKR) | 0 | 1 | 3 | 4 |
| 20 | Slovenia (SLO) | 0 | 1 | 2 | 3 |
| 20 | West Germany | 0 | 1 | 2 | 3 |
| 22 | Bulgaria (BUL) | 0 | 1 | 1 | 2 |
| 22 | Finland (FIN) | 0 | 1 | 1 | 2 |
| 22 | Germany (GER) | 0 | 1 | 1 | 2 |
| 25 | Belgium (BEL) | 0 | 1 | 0 | 1 |
| 25 | Sweden (SWE) | 0 | 1 | 0 | 1 |
| 27 | Austria (AUT) | 0 | 0 | 1 | 1 |
| 27 | Cyprus (CYP) | 0 | 0 | 1 | 1 |
| 27 | Turkey (TUR) | 0 | 0 | 1 | 1 |
| Totals (29 entries) | | 50 | 52 | 44 | 146 |
