= Roland Brückner =

East German gymnast

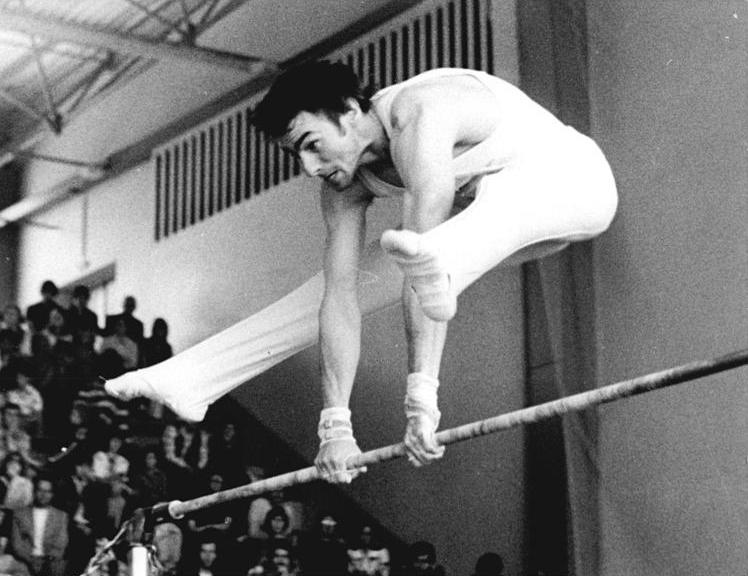
- Roland Brückner in 1978

Personal information
- Born: 14 December 1955 (age 70) Köthen, East Germany
- Height: 1.72 m (5 ft 8 in)

Gymnastics career
- Discipline: Men's artistic gymnastics
- Country represented: East Germany
- Club: SC Dynamo Berlin
Medal record
Olympic Games
Gold medal – first place	1980 Moscow	Floor
Silver medal – second place	1980 Moscow	Team
Bronze medal – third place	1976 Montreal	Team
Bronze medal – third place	1980 Moscow	Vault
Bronze medal – third place	1980 Moscow	Parallel bars
Friendship Games
Gold medal – first place	1984 Olomouc	Floor
Bronze medal – third place	1984 Olomouc	Team
World Championships
Gold medal – first place	1979 Fort Worth	Floor
Bronze medal – third place	1978 Strasbourg	Team
European Championships
Gold medal – first place	1981 Rome	Floor

Roland Brückner (born 14 December 1955) is a retired East German gymnast. He competed at the 1976 and 1980 Summer Olympics in all artistic gymnastics events and won a bronze and a silver medal in the team competition, respectively. Individually, he won a gold in the floor exercise and two bronze medals in the vault and parallel bars in 1980. He won two more gold medals in the floor exercise at the 1979 World Artistic Gymnastics Championships and 1981 European Championships. He missed the 1984 Summer Olympics due to the boycott by East Germany and competed at the Friendship Games instead, winning a gold on the floor and a silver in the team competition.

He retired from competitions shortly after the 1984 Friendship Games and later worked as a trainer near Ulm in Germany and at the NKL Liestal, Switzerland. He was chosen the 1984 Gymnast of the Year in East Germany. He is married and has two children, Sandra and Thomas.
