= Roland Hürzeler =

Swiss gymnast (1945–2023)

- Born: 17 March 1945 Uerkheim, Switzerland
- Died: 8 March 2023 (aged 77) Kriens, Switzerland
- Height: 1.74 m (5 ft 9 in)

Gymnastics career
- Discipline: Men's artistic gymnastics
- Country represented: Switzerland
- Gym: Lucerne Citizens' Gymnastics Club
Medal record
Representing Switzerland
European Championships
Bronze medal – third place	1971 Madrid	Horizontal bar

Roland Hürzeler (17 March 1945 – 8 March 2023) was a Swiss gymnast. He competed in eight events at the 1968 Summer Olympics.
