= Stolbov =

Stolbov (masculine, Russian: Столбов) or Stolbova (feminine, Russian: Столбова) is a Russian surname. Notable people with the surname include:

- Alexander Stolbov (born 1929), Russian painter and teacher
- Ksenia Stolbova (born 1992), Russian figure skater
- Pavel Stolbov (1929–2011), Soviet gymnast
