= 1986 FIG Artistic Gymnastics World Cup =

International gymnastics competition

The 1986 Artistic Gymnastics World Cup was held in Beijing, China 30 August - 1 September 1986.

== Medal winners ==
Event	Gold	Silver	Bronze	Ref.
Men's individual all-around	(China) Li Ning (Soviet Union) Yuri Korolev	None awarded	(Soviet Union) Vladimir Artemov	
Women's individual all-around	(Soviet Union) Elena Shushunova	(Romania) Daniela Silivaş	(Soviet Union) Oksana Omelianchik	
Men's floor exercise	(China) Li Ning	(Soviet Union) Yuri Korolev	(East Germany) Sylvio Kroll	
Men's pommel horse	(China) Li Ning	(Soviet Union) Valentin Mogilny	(China) Xu Zhiqiang	
Men's still rings	(Soviet Union) Valentin Mogilny (Soviet Union) Yuri Korolev	None awarded	(China) Li Ning	
Men's vault	(Soviet Union) Yuri Korolev (East Germany) Sylvio Kroll	None awarded	(China) Xu Zhiqiang	
Men's parallel bars	(Soviet Union) Valentin Mogilny (China) Xu Zhiqiang	None awarded	(Soviet Union) Yuri Korolev	
Men's horizontal bar	(Soviet Union) Yuri Korolev	(East Germany) Sylvio Kroll	(Italy) Boris Preti	
Women's vault	(Soviet Union) Elena Shushunova	(Soviet Union) Oksana Omelianchik	(Romania) Ecaterina Szabo	
Women's uneven bars	(Soviet Union) Elena Shushunova	(Soviet Union) Oksana Omelianchik	(Romania) Daniela Silivaş	
Women's balance beam	(Soviet Union) Oksana Omelianchik	(Romania) Daniela Silivaş	(Soviet Union) Elena Shushunova	
Women's floor exercise	(Soviet Union) Elena Shushunova	(Romania) Camelia Voinea	(Soviet Union) Oksana Omelianchik	
