= Dan Grecu =

Romanian artistic gymnast (1950–2024)

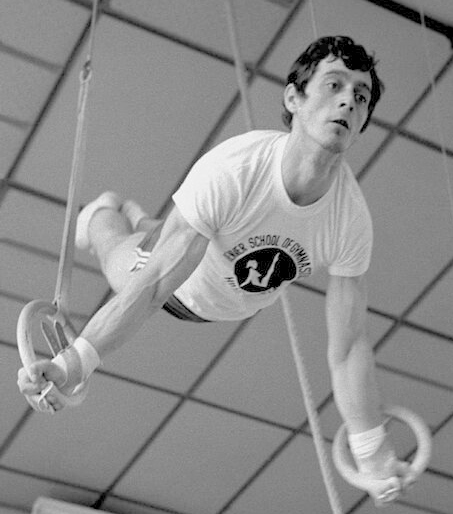
- Grecu in 1976

Personal information
- Full name: Dănuț Grecu
- Born: 26 September 1950 Bucharest, Romania
- Died: 12 December 2024 (aged 74) Brașov, Romania
- Height: 170 cm (5 ft 7 in)

Gymnastics career
- Discipline: Men's artistic gymnastics
- Country represented: Romania
- Club: CS Dinamo București
- Head coaches: Octav Ungureanu; Mircea Badulescu
- Retired: 1980
Medal record
Olympic Games
Bronze medal – third place	1976 Montreal	Rings
World Championships
Gold medal – first place	1974 Varna	Rings
Silver medal – second place	1979 Fort Worth	Rings
Bronze medal – third place	1978 Strasbourg	Rings
European Championships
Gold medal – first place	1975 Bern	Rings
Silver medal – second place	1973 Grenoble	Rings

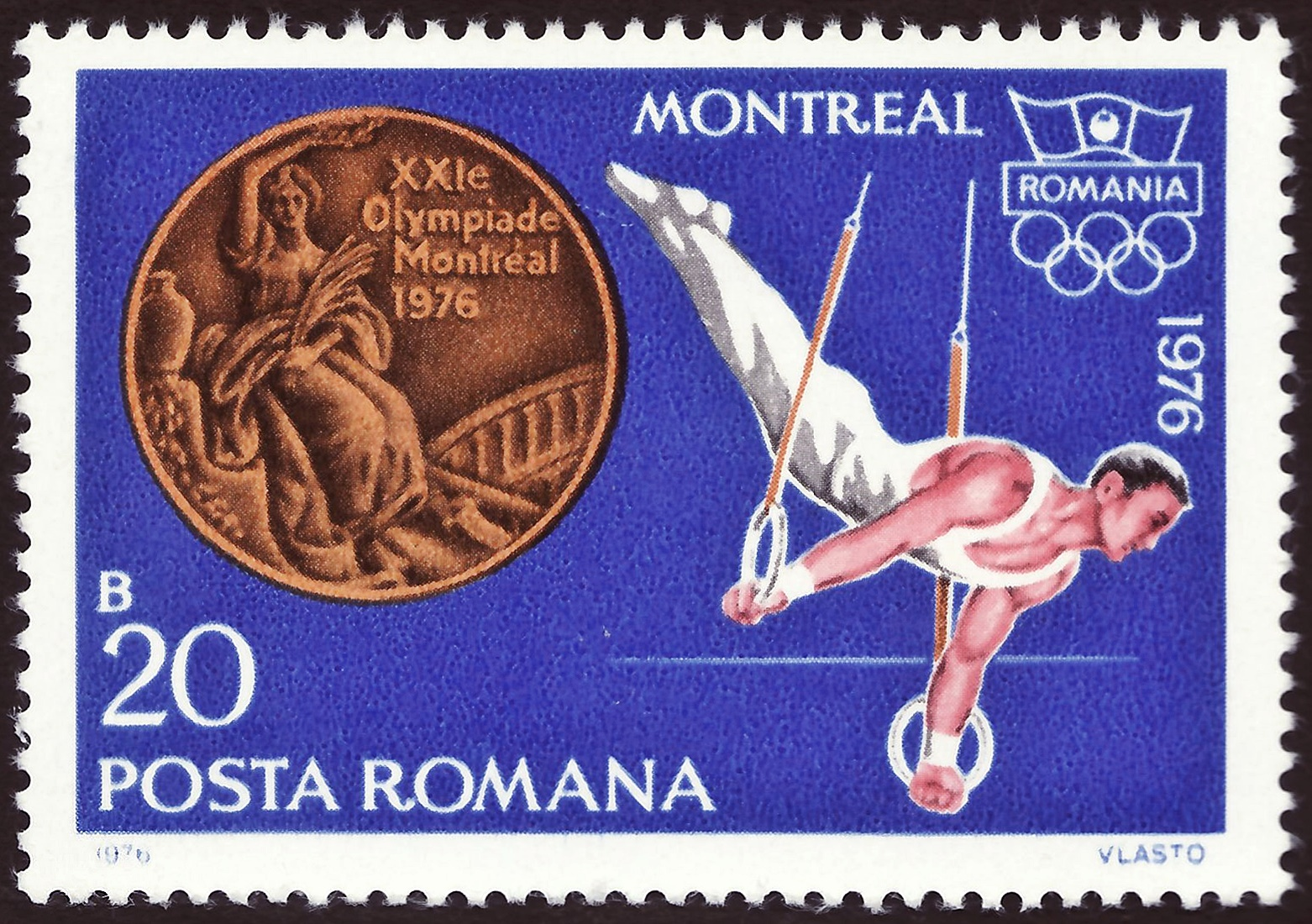
Commemorative stamp of Dan Grecu from the 1976 Olympic Games.

Dănuț Grecu (26 September 1950 – 12 December 2024) was a Romanian artistic gymnast who specialised in rings. In 1974 he became Romania’s first world champion in artistic gymnastics and was named Romanian Athlete of the Year. Grecu competed at the 1972, 1976, and 1980 Olympics and won a bronze medal in 1976; he had to withdraw from the 1980 Olympics due to a muscle tear sustained on the rings. In addition to his 1974 gold medal he won two world and two European medals on the rings. He retired due to injuries to his shoulder and biceps sustained in training while preparing to the 1980 Olympics.

Grecu was one of five siblings of a border guard officer. At the age of 12 he took up gymnastics because he loved climbing anything hanging around, like ropes and tree branches. After retiring from competitions Grecu had a long career as gymnastics coach with the national team. Grecu was married to a fellow gymnastics coach Elena Grecu. They had two children: a daughter Simona and a son Bogdan.

Grecu died on 12 December 2024, at the age of 74.
