= Martin Šrot =

Slovenian gymnast (born 1938)

- Мартин Шрот
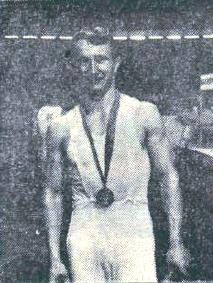

Personal information
- Alternative name: Tine Šrot
- Born: 10 August 1938 (age 88) Celje, Kingdom of Yugoslavia
- Height: 1.61 m (5 ft 3 in)

Gymnastics career
- Discipline: Men's artistic gymnastics
- Country represented: Yugoslavia
Medal record
Representing Czechoslovakia
European championships
Bronze medal – third place	1963 Belgrade	Vault

Martin "Tine" Šrot (born 10 August 1938) is a Slovenian gymnast. He competed at the 1964 Summer Olympics and the 1968 Summer Olympics.
