= Patrice Casimir =

French gymnast

- Born: 4 July 1972 (age 54) Saint-Pierre, Réunion
- Height: 1.69 m (5 ft 7 in)
- Relatives: Éric Casimir (brother)

Gymnastics career
- Discipline: Men's artistic gymnastics
- Country represented: France
- Club: OAJLP
Medal record
Representing France
European Championships
Bronze medal – third place	1996 Brøndby	Pommel horse

Patrice Casimir (born 4 July 1972) is a French gymnast. He competed at the 1992 Summer Olympics and the 1996 Summer Olympics.
