= Gymnastics at the 1980 Summer Olympics – Men's artistic team all-around =

Men's artistic team all-around at the Games of the XXII Olympiad
- Venue: Sports Palace of the Central Lenin Stadium
- Date: 20 July 1980 (qualifying); 22 July 1980 (final)
- Competitors: 54 from 9 nations
- Winning total: 589.600 points

Medalists
1st place, gold medalist(s)		Nikolay Andrianov; Eduard Azaryan; Aleksandr Dityatin; Bogdan Makuts; Vladimir Markelov	Soviet Union
2nd place, silver medalist(s)		Ralf-Peter Hemmann; Lutz Hoffmann; Lutz Mack; Michael Nikolay; Andreas Bronst; Roland Brückner	East Germany
3rd place, bronze medalist(s)		Ferenc Donáth; György Guczoghy; Zoltán Kelemen; Péter Kovács; Zoltán Magyar; István Vámos	Hungary

These are the results of the men's team all-around competition, one of eight events for male competitors in artistic gymnastics at the 1980 Summer Olympics in Moscow. The compulsory and optional rounds took place on 20 and 22 July at the Sports Palace of the Central Lenin Stadium.

== Medalists ==
Gold	Silver	Bronze
Soviet Union; Nikolay Andrianov; Eduard Azaryan; Aleksandr Dityatin; Bogdan Makuts; Vladimir Markelov; Aleksandr Tkachyov	East Germany; Ralf-Peter Hemmann; Lutz Hoffmann; Lutz Mack; Michael Nikolay; Andreas Bronst; Roland Brückner	Hungary; Ferenc Donáth; György Guczoghy; Zoltán Kelemen; Péter Kovács; Zoltán Magyar; István Vámos

== Results ==
The final score for each team was determined by combining all of the scores earned by the team on each apparatus during the compulsory and optional rounds. If all six gymnasts on a team performed a routine on a single apparatus during compulsories or optionals, only the five highest scores on that apparatus counted toward the team total.

Rank	Team	Total
Gold medal	Soviet Union	589.600
Silver medal	East Germany	581.150
Bronze medal	Hungary	575.000
4	Romania	572.300
5	Bulgaria	571.550
6	Czechoslovakia	569.800
7	Cuba	563.200
8	France	559.200
9	North Korea	551.350
