= Jiří Fiřt =

Czech gymnast

- Born: 1 August 1972 (age 54) Prague, Czechoslovakia

Gymnastics career
- Discipline: Men's artistic gymnastics
- Country represented: Czech Republic

Jiří Fiřt (born 1 August 1972) is a Czech gymnast. He competed at the 1996 Summer Olympics. He is now a coach of artistic gymnastics.
