= Sylvio Kroll =

German gymnast (born 1965)

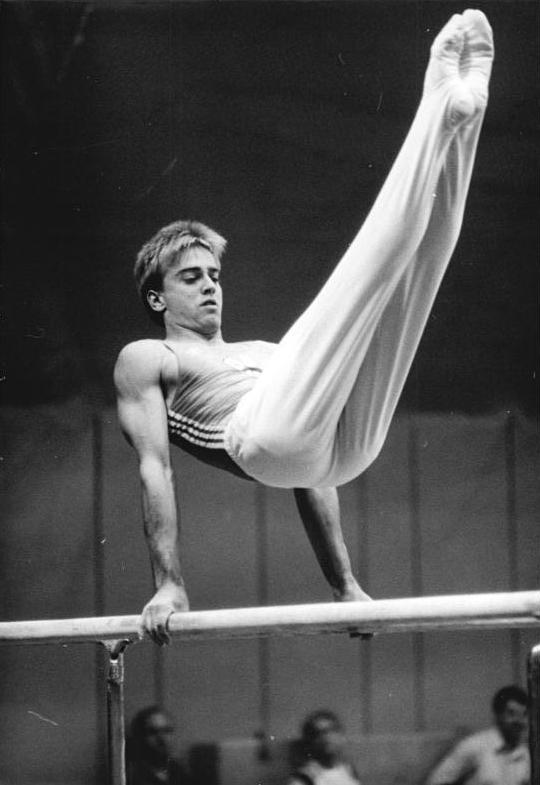
- Kroll in 1988

Personal information
- Born: 29 April 1965 (age 61) Lübben, East Germany

Gymnastics career
- Discipline: Men's artistic gymnastics
- Country represented: Germany; (1991–1994)
- Former countries represented: East Germany (1982–1990)
Medal record
Representing East Germany
Olympic Games
Silver medal – second place	1988 Seoul	Team
Silver medal – second place	1988 Seoul	Vault
World Championships
Gold medal – first place	1985 Montreal	Parallel bars
Gold medal – first place	1987 Rotterdam	Vault
Silver medal – second place	1985 Montreal	Horizontal bar
Silver medal – second place	1989 Stuttgart	Team
Silver medal – second place	1989 Stuttgart	Vault
Bronze medal – third place	1985 Montreal	Team
Bronze medal – third place	1985 Montreal	All-around
Bronze medal – third place	1987 Rotterdam	Team
European Championships
Gold medal – first place	1985 Oslo	Vault
Silver medal – second place	1985 Oslo	Pommel horse
Silver medal – second place	1985 Oslo	Parallel bars
Silver medal – second place	1987 Moscow	Vault
Representing Germany
World Championships
Bronze medal – third place	1991 Indianapolis	Team

Sylvio Kroll (born 29 April 1965 in Lübben) is a German former artistic gymnast. He represented East Germany at the 1988 Olympic Games and Germany at the 1992 Olympic Games. He is a two-time Olympic silver medalist and two-time World Champion.

== Early life ==
Kroll was born in Lübben, East Germany on April 29, 1965. He began training gymnastics under the tutelage of coach Guido Janz, father of Olympic champion Karin Büttner-Janz.

== Gymnastics career ==
Kroll made his World Championship debut at the 1983 edition, with his best finish being fourth on vault. He did not compete at the 1984 Summer Olympics due to East Germany boycotting the Olympics. He did compete at the Friendship Games (alternative Olympics), where he helped East Germany win silver behind the Soviet Union. Individually, he won gold on vault and bronze on floor exercise.

At the 1985 European Championships, Kroll won gold on vault and silver on pommel horse and parallel bars. Later that year at the 1985 World Championships, Kroll helped East Germany win bronze as a team. Individually, he won gold on parallel bars, silver on horizontal bar, and bronze in the all-around. In October 1986, he was awarded a Star of People's Friendship in gold (second class) for his sporting success.

At the 1987 European Championships, Kroll was unable to defend his title and won silver on vault behind Yuri Korolyov. However, at the 1987 World Championships, Kroll co-won vault alongside Lou Yun of China. Kroll made his Olympic debut at the 1988 Summer Olympics, where he helped East Germany win silver, tying East Germany's best Olympic team placement from 1980. Individually, Kroll won silver on vault behind Lou.

At the 1989 World Championships, Kroll won silver on vault behind compatriot Jörg Behrend. At the 1991 World Championships, Kroll helped a reunified Germany win bronze as a team. Kroll represented Germany at the 1992 Olympics, where he placed sixth on vault.

Kroll retired from gymnastics in 1994 at the age of 29.

== Post-gymnastics career ==
After retiring from competitive gymnastics, Kroll became a judge, continuing to participate in national and international competitions. In 2005, he began working for the German Gymnastics Federation, initially serving as a member of the Executive Board for Elite Olympic Sports. He was elected Vice President for Elite Olympic Sports in 2013. In 2021, he stepped down from his role, opting to not re-run for election.

== Competitive history ==
Competitive history of Sylvio Kroll
Year	Event	Team	AA	FX	PH	SR	VT	PB	HB
1982	GDR Championships						1st place, gold medalist(s)		
1982	Junior European Championships		9	7			3rd place, bronze medalist(s)		4
1982	Jr. GDR-TCH Dual Meet		6						
1982	Tournament of Tomorrow		5						
1983	Chunichi Cup		7			2nd place, silver medalist(s)			
1983	FRA-GDR Dual Meet	1st place, gold medalist(s)	1st place, gold medalist(s)						
1983	GDR Championships		1st place, gold medalist(s)						
1983	GDR-NOR Dual Meet	1st place, gold medalist(s)	2nd place, silver medalist(s)						
1983	Jr. GDR-USSR Dual Meet	2nd place, silver medalist(s)	1st place, gold medalist(s)		2nd place, silver medalist(s)	1st place, gold medalist(s)	1st place, gold medalist(s)		
1983	World Championships		15	7	5		4		
1984	Chunichi Cup		2nd place, silver medalist(s)	2nd place, silver medalist(s)	2nd place, silver medalist(s)		1st place, gold medalist(s)	4	5
1984	GDR Championships		3rd place, bronze medalist(s)				1st place, gold medalist(s)	2nd place, silver medalist(s)	1st place, gold medalist(s)
1984	Friendship Games	2nd place, silver medalist(s)	19	3rd place, bronze medalist(s)			1st place, gold medalist(s)		
1984	Tokyo Cup			8	1st place, gold medalist(s)		3rd place, bronze medalist(s)		
1985	Cottbus International		4	1st place, gold medalist(s)		3rd place, bronze medalist(s)			
1985	DTB Cup		1st place, gold medalist(s)			2nd place, silver medalist(s)	1st place, gold medalist(s)	2nd place, silver medalist(s)	3rd place, bronze medalist(s)
1985	European Championships		4		2nd place, silver medalist(s)		1st place, gold medalist(s)	2nd place, silver medalist(s)	5
1985	Arthur Gander Memorial		4						
1985	GDR Championships		3rd place, bronze medalist(s)						
1985	GDR-SUI Dual Meet	1st place, gold medalist(s)	1st place, gold medalist(s)						
1985	Moscow News		6		5		3rd place, bronze medalist(s)	4	5
1985	World Championships	3rd place, bronze medalist(s)	3rd place, bronze medalist(s)	4	6	8	8	1st place, gold medalist(s)	2nd place, silver medalist(s)
1986	Belgian Gym Masters		7						
1986	FRA-GDR Dual Meet	1st place, gold medalist(s)	1st place, gold medalist(s)						
1986	Goodwill Games	2nd place, silver medalist(s)	4		7		3rd place, bronze medalist(s)		5
1986	World Cup		4	3rd place, bronze medalist(s)	8		1st place, gold medalist(s)	5	2nd place, silver medalist(s)
1987	American Cup		8						
1987	Cottbus International		1st place, gold medalist(s)			1st place, gold medalist(s)	1st place, gold medalist(s)	1st place, gold medalist(s)	
1987	DTB Cup		2nd place, silver medalist(s)	3rd place, bronze medalist(s)	1st place, gold medalist(s)	4	1st place, gold medalist(s)		1st place, gold medalist(s)
1987	DTV Cup		3rd place, bronze medalist(s)						
1987	European Championships		4	7	8	4	2nd place, silver medalist(s)		2nd place, silver medalist(s)
1987	Arthur Gander Memorial		1st place, gold medalist(s)						
1987	GDR Championships		2nd place, silver medalist(s)			4			
1987	World Championships	3rd place, bronze medalist(s)	4	6	5		1st place, gold medalist(s)	4	
1988	DTB Cup		5	6		3rd place, bronze medalist(s)	1st place, gold medalist(s)	4	2nd place, silver medalist(s)
1988	GDR Championships		1st place, gold medalist(s)	1st place, gold medalist(s)	1st place, gold medalist(s)		1st place, gold medalist(s)		
1988	Olympic Games	2nd place, silver medalist(s)	19		8		1st place, gold medalist(s)	7	
1989	Cottbus International		1st place, gold medalist(s)						
1989	GDR Championships		2nd place, silver medalist(s)						
1989	GDR Cup		3rd place, bronze medalist(s)						
1989	World Championships	2nd place, silver medalist(s)	10	7			2nd place, silver medalist(s)		
1989	World Sports Fair		7						
1990	Joaquin Blume Memorial		4						
1990	Goodwill Games	4	6	6			2nd place, silver medalist(s)		
1990	Olympic Cup		2nd place, silver medalist(s)						
1991	Chunichi Cup		8		5	5			5
1991	Cottbus International		1st place, gold medalist(s)	4			2nd place, silver medalist(s)	4	1st place, gold medalist(s)
1991	German Championships		2nd place, silver medalist(s)						
1991	Tokyo Cup				6	2nd place, silver medalist(s)	6		
1991	World Championships	3rd place, bronze medalist(s)	5	7	8		4	5	6
1992	Cottbus International		5		1st place, gold medalist(s)	3rd place, bronze medalist(s)	6		
1992	Olympic Games	4	26				4		
1994	Reese's International Cup		4						

== Gallery ==
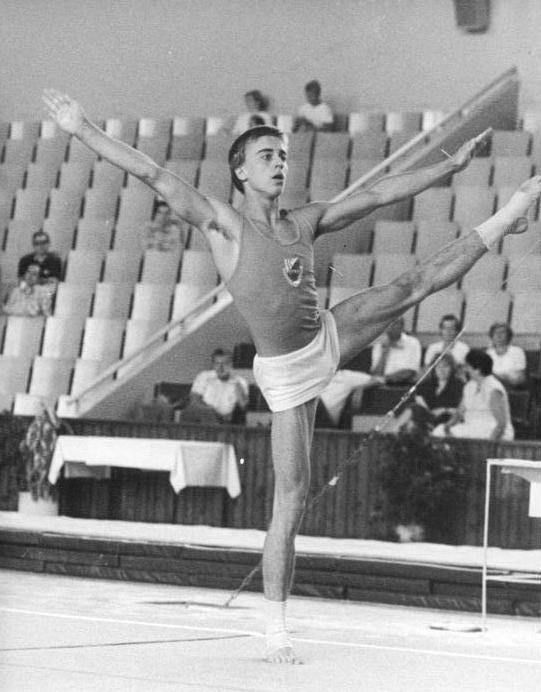
Floor exercise, 1983

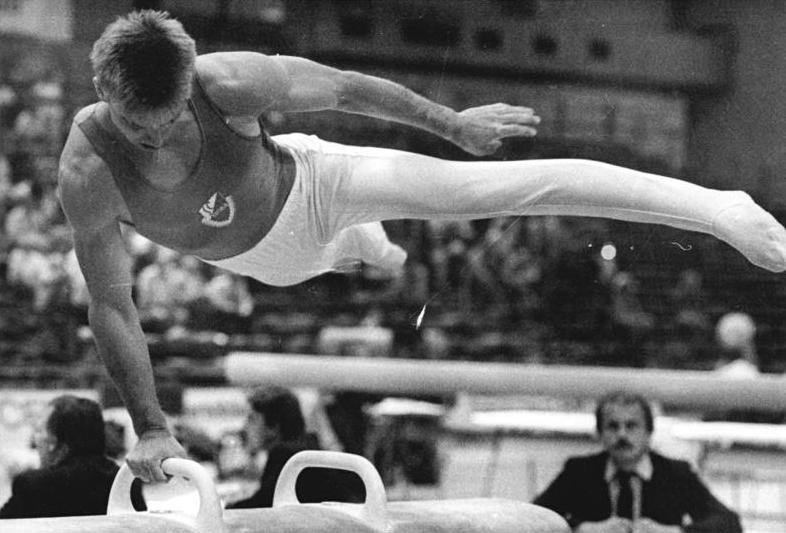
Pommel horse, 1988

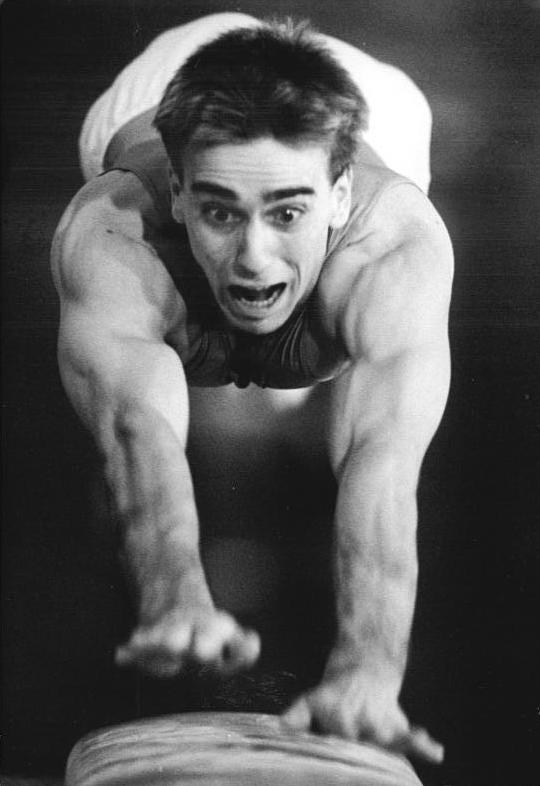
Vault, 1989

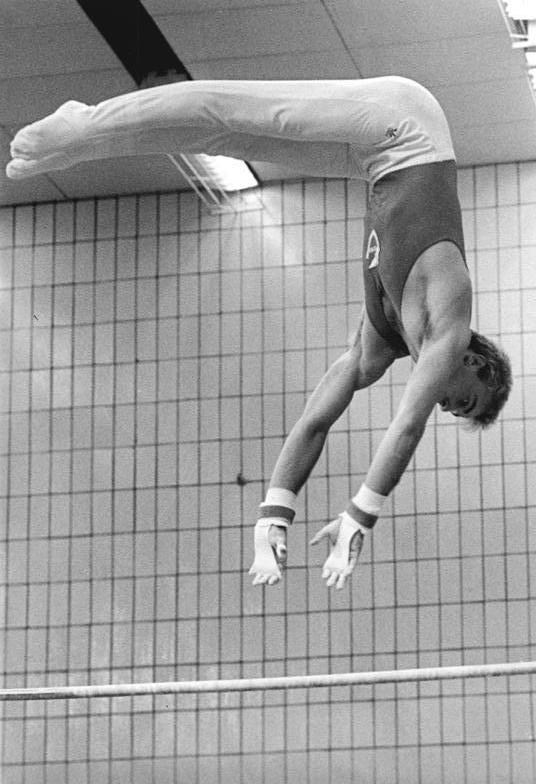
Horizontal bar, 1989
