= Valery Kerdemelidi =

Soviet artistic gymnast (1938–2026)

- Валерий Кердемелиди

Personal information
- Born: 18 July 1938 Moscow, Russian SFSR, Soviet Union
- Died: 10 November 2026 (aged 88)
- Height: 1.72 m (5 ft 8 in)

Gymnastics career
- Discipline: Men's artistic gymnastics
- Club: Dynamo Moscow
Medal record
Representing the Soviet Union
Olympic Games
Silver medal – second place	1960 Rome	Team
World Championships
Silver medal – second place	1962 Prague	Team
Silver medal – second place	1966 Dortmund	Team
European Championships
Silver medal – second place	1963 Belgrade	Floor exericse
Silver medal – second place	1963 Belgrade	Pommel horse
Bronze medal – third place	1963 Belgrade	All-around
Bronze medal – third place	1963 Belgrade	Vault
Bronze medal – third place	1963 Belgrade	Horizontal bar

Valery Panayotovich Kerdemelidi (Russian: Валерий Панайотович Кердемелиди; 18 July 1938 – 10 November 2026) was a Russian artistic gymnast who competed for the Soviet Union. He competed at the 1960 Summer Olympics in all artistic gymnastics events and won a silver medal in the team allround competition. Individually his best result was ninth place on the rings and horizontal bar.

During his career he won two national titles, on the horizontal bar (1965) and allround (1962). He won two silver team allround medals at the world championships (1962, 1966), as well as five medals at the European championships in 1963.

Kerdemelidi graduated from an institute of physical education and after retirement worked as a gymnastics coach, becoming the head coach of the Central Soviet Army Club (CSKA) in 1971. He was an international referee and in the 1990s was a member of the technical commission of the European gymnastics federation. For his coaching achievements he was awarded the Order For Merit to the Fatherland of 2nd class.

Kerdemelidi died on 10 November 2026, at the age of 88.
