= Mauno Nissinen =

Finnish gymnast

- Full name: Mauno Aulis Nissinen
- Born: 16 August 1947 (age 79) Oulu, Finland
- Height: 170 cm (5 ft 7 in)

Gymnastics career
- Discipline: Men's artistic gymnastics
- Country represented: Finland
Medal record
Representing Finland
European Championships
| Silver medal – second place | 1973 Grenoble | Parallel bars |

Mauno Aulis Nissinen (born 16 August 1947) is a Finnish gymnast. He competed at the 1968 Summer Olympics and the 1972 Summer Olympics.
