= Andrzej Szajna =

Polish gymnast (1949–2024)

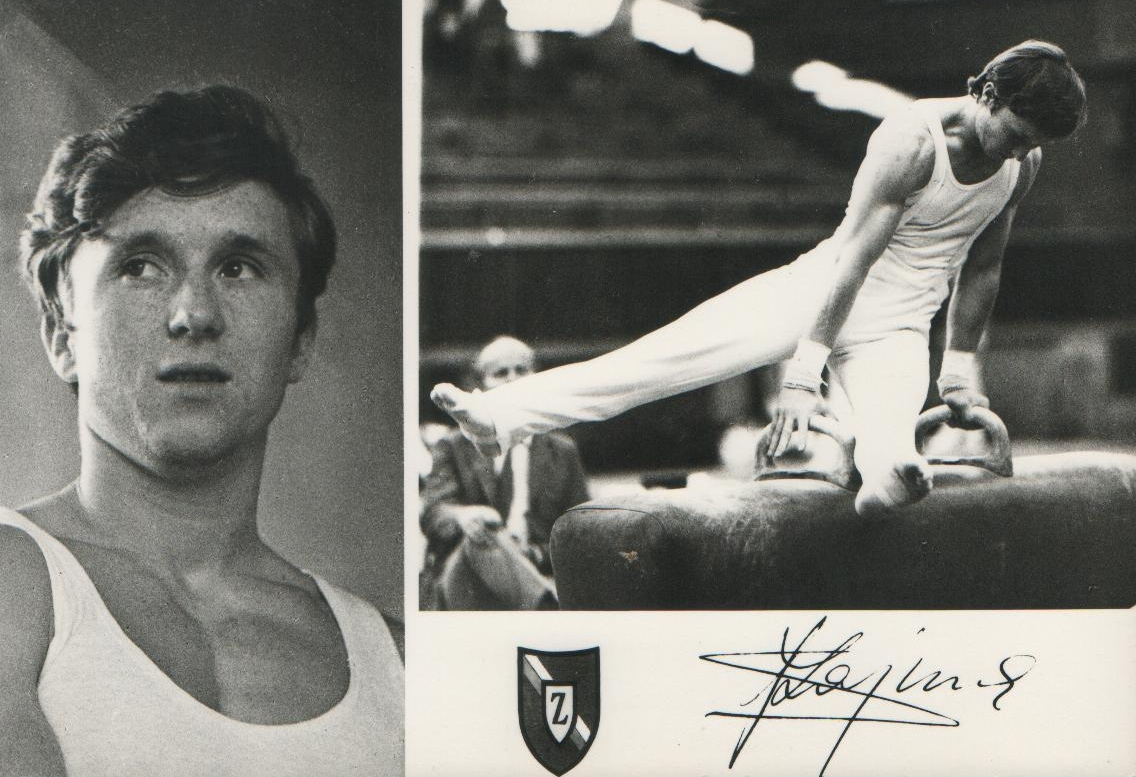
- Szajna in the 1970s

Personal information
- Born: 30 September 1949 Wrocław, Polish People's Republic
- Died: 22 January 2024 (aged 74)
- Height: 1.64 m (5 ft 5 in)

Gymnastics career
- Discipline: Men's artistic gymnastics
- Country represented: Poland
- Club: Zawisza Bydgoszcz
Medal record
Men's artistic gymnastics
Representing Poland
World Championships
Bronze medal – third place	1974 Varna	Rings
Bronze medal – third place	1974 Varna	Horizontal bar
European Championships
Gold medal – first place	1975 Berne	Floor
Silver medal – second place	1971 Madrid	Vault
Silver medal – second place	1973 Grenoble	Vault
Silver medal – second place	1975 Berne	Vault
Bronze medal – third place	1971 Madrid	Rings
Bronze medal – third place	1975 Berne	Horizontal bar

Andrzej Szajna (30 September 1949 – 22 January 2024) was a Polish artistic gymnast who won two individual bronze medals at the 1974 World Championships. He competed at the 1972, 1976, and 1980 Summer Olympics with the best individual result of sixth place all-around and on parallel bars in 1976. At the European championships he shared gold medal on the floor with Nikolai Andrianov in 1975 and placed second on the vault behind Andrianov in 1971, 1973, and 1975.

Szajna was a family man with five daughters and two sons, who had refused several offers to move to another sports club in Poland or United States. He retired after winning five medals at the 1984 Polish championships, including two gold medals. Until 1989 he served with the Polish Army and later worked as a bodyguard. He remained active in gymnastics as a coach and referee.

Andrej Szajna died on 22 January 2024, at the age of 74.
