= Stoyan Deltchev =

Bulgarian gymnast (born 1959)

- Born: 3 July 1959 (age 67) Plovdiv, Bulgaria

Gymnastics career
- Discipline: Men's artistic gymnastics
- Country represented: Bulgaria
- Eponymous skills: Deltchev (B) (rings): Felge upward to support with straddled legs supported above the ring Deltchev (C) (horizontal bar): Swing fwd 1/2 twist to salto forward straddle to hang
Medal record
Olympic Games
Gold medal – first place	1980 Moscow	Horizontal bar
Bronze medal – third place	1980 Moscow	All-around
World Championships
Bronze medal – third place	1978 Strasbourg	Pommel horse
Bronze medal – third place	1978 Strasbourg	Horizontal bar
European Championships
Gold medal – first place	1977 Vilnius	Horizontal bar
Gold medal – first place	1979 Essen	All-around
Gold medal – first place	1979 Essen	Floor exercise
Silver medal – second place	1979 Essen	Horizontal bar
Bronze medal – third place	1979 Essen	Vault

Stoyan Deltchev (Bulgarian: Стоян Делчев, born in Plovdiv, July 3, 1959) is a Bulgarian retired artistic gymnast and a European and Olympic champion. He competed at the 1980 Summer Olympics in Moscow, where he won a gold medal in horizontal bar and a bronze medal in the all-around, and he won the all-around at the 1979 European Championships.

== Early life ==
Deltchev began gymnastics when he was 10; he initially played football, and his father noticed his athleticism and decided to put him in a more individual sport.

== Gymnastics career ==
Deltchev competed at the 1977 European Championships, where he won the gold medal in the horizontal bar final. That year, at an invitational competition in Riga, he first competed the horizontal bar move now named after him, which was the first aerial release move on the apparatus.

The following year, he competed at the 1978 World Championships, where he finished eighth in the all-around and won two bronze medals in the apparatus finals, one in pommel horse and the other with the horizontal bar, where he tied with Gennady Krysin.

In 1979, Deltchev won the all-around at the 1979 European Championships. He was the first man representing a country outside the Soviet Union to win the competition in fourteen years. He also competed at the 1979 World Cup, where he won bronze in the all-around as well as gold on the floor exercise.

Deltchev represented Bulgaria at the 1980 Summer Olympics, where he won the all-around bronze medal. In the event finals, he became the Olympic champion on the horizontal bar.

== Post-gymnastics career ==
After he finished competing, Deltchev went to Liverpool, England to coach for several months, before he moved to the United States in 1991. He initially worked in Napa, California, and he now owns a gymnastics school in Reno, Nevada.

== Awards and honors ==
In 2008, he was named to the International Gymnastics Hall of Fame. In 2019, he and other Bulgarian gymnasts such as Boriana Stoyanova were recognized for their achievements at the opening of the 2019 Bulgarian championships.

== Personal life ==
He has a daughter, Deliana.

== Eponymous skills ==
In an interview about his career in 2002, Deltchev reflected on how he trained many different skills that he was not able to put into his competitive routines, as he was Bulgaria's main gymnast during his career and often traveled to compete. He first succeeded with his eponymous high bar move after watching another gymnast attempt it at his gym; the gymnast's coach encouraged Deltchev to try it, and he managed to regrab the bar on his third attempt. He claimed he invented his eponymous move on the rings by accident after his grip became stuck on the rings.

Deltchev has two eponymous skills listed in the men's Code of Points, one on the rings and one on the horizontal bar:

Apparatus	Name	Description	Difficulty (Note: Valid for the 2025–2028 Code of Points)
Rings	Deltchev	Felge upward to support with straddled legs supported above the rings (2 seconds)	B (0.2)
Horizontal bar	Deltchev	Swing forward to ½ twist salto, forward straddle to hang	C (0.3)

His high bar skill, performed on the uneven bars, is also named for him in the women's Code of Points.
