= European Men's and Women's Artistic Gymnastics Individual Championships =

The European Men's and Women's Artistic Gymnastics Individual Championships are an artistic gymnastics championships for male and female gymnasts from European countries organised by the European Union of Gymnastics. They were first held in 2005 and have been held biennially since then in odd-numbered years. These championships occur in years between the European Men's Artistic Gymnastics Championships and the European Women's Artistic Gymnastics Championships, which have been held in even-numbered years since 1990.

== Championships ==
Year	Number	Host city	Venue	Events
2005	1	(Hungary) Debrecen	Főnix Hall	12
2007	2	(Netherlands) Amsterdam	Amsterdam Exhibition Centre	12
2009	3	(Italy) Milan	DatchForum di Assago	12
2011	4	(Germany) Berlin	Max-Schmeling-Halle	12
2013	5	(Russia) Moscow	Olympic Stadium	12
2015	6	(France) Montpellier	Park&Suites Arena	12
2017	7	(Romania) Cluj-Napoca	Polyvalent Hall	12
2019	8	(Poland) Szczecin	Arena Szczecin	12
2021	9	(Switzerland) Basel	St. Jakobshalle	12
2023	10	(Turkey) Antalya	Antalya Sports Hall	14
2025	11	(Germany) Leipzig	Messe Leipzig	15
2027	12	(Armenia) Yerevan		

== All Medals (2005 - 2025) ==
Rank	Nation	Gold	Silver	Bronze	Total
1	Russia	32	25	26	83
2	Great Britain	17	23	13	53
3	France	12	12	7	31
4	Ukraine	11	3	16	30
5	Romania	10	18	10	38
6	Italy	9	10	15	34
7	Germany	9	10	11	30
8	Switzerland	5	7	5	17
9	Netherlands	5	6	6	17
10	Turkey	5	2	2	9
11	Greece	5	0	7	12
12	Hungary	4	5	4	13
13	Armenia	4	3	6	13
14	Spain	3	2	2	7
15	Belgium	3	1	3	7
16	Croatia	2	1	0	3
17	Israel	1	5	2	8
18	Slovenia	1	2	1	4
19	Ireland	1	0	0	1
19	Latvia	1	0	0	1
19	Lithuania	1	0	0	1
22	Bulgaria	0	3	1	4
23	Sweden	0	1	0	1
24	Belarus	0	0	2	2
25	Cyprus	0	0	1	1
Totals (25 entries)		141	139	140	420

== See also ==
- European Artistic Gymnastics Championships
  - European Men's Artistic Gymnastics Championships
  - European Women's Artistic Gymnastics Championships
