= Zoltán Magyar =

Hungarian gymnast

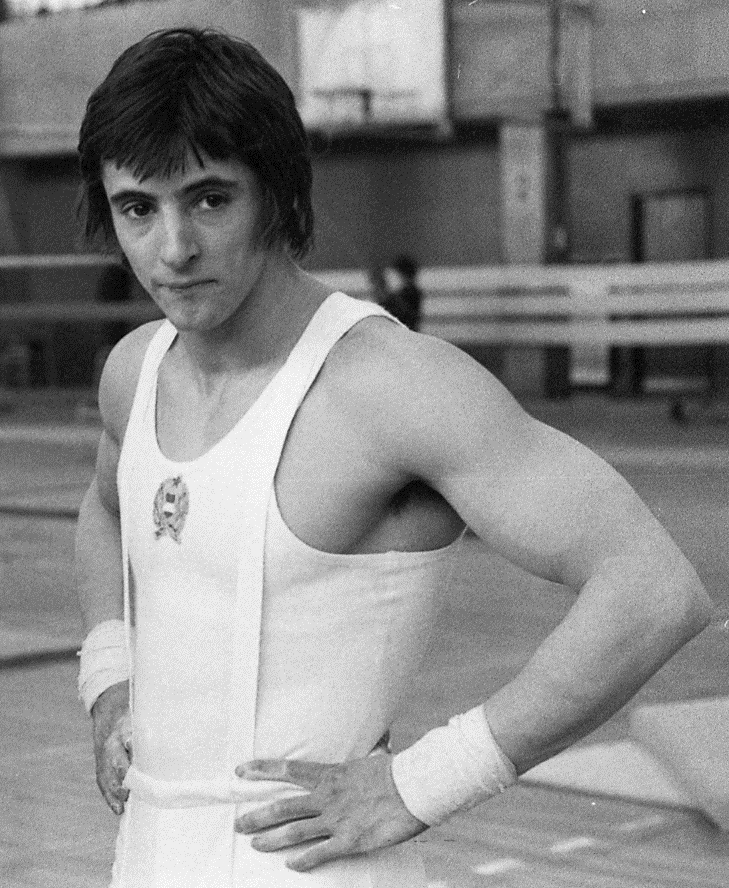
- Magyar in 1976

Personal information
- Born: 13 December 1953 (age 72) Budapest, Hungary
- Height: 165 cm (5 ft 5 in)

Gymnastics career
- Discipline: Men's artistic gymnastics
- Country represented: Hungary
- Club: Ferencvárosi TC, Budapest
- Eponymous skills: Magyar spindle, Magyar travel
Medal record
Olympic Games
Gold medal – first place	1976 Montréal	Pommel horse
Gold medal – first place	1980 Moscow	Pommel horse
Bronze medal – third place	1980 Moscow	Team
World Championships
Gold medal – first place	1974 Varna	Pommel horse
Gold medal – first place	1978 Strasbourg	Pommel horse
Gold medal – first place	1979 Ft. Worth	Pommel horse
European Championships
Gold medal – first place	1973 Grenoble	Pommel horse
Gold medal – first place	1975 Bern	Pommel horse
Gold medal – first place	1977 Vilnius	Pommel horse

Zoltán Magyar (born 13 December 1953) is a Hungarian former gymnast who was the world's leading pommel horse gymnast in the 1970s. In this event he won two Olympic, three world, three European and two World Cup titles. Magyar had two moves named after him, the Magyar spindle (turning the body in the opposite direction from the circling legs) and the Magyar travel (crosswise circling travel down the horse).

He won the Olympic gold in 1976 and 1980, world championships gold in 1974, 1978 and 1979, European championships gold in 1973, 1975 and 1977; and World Cup gold in 1975 and 1978. His largest margin of victory came at the 1978 World Championships, which he won by 0.375 points. For his achievements he was named Hungarian Sportsman of the year in 1974, 1978 and 1980.

In major all-around competitions, Magyar was ubiquitous but less successful. In Olympic all-around finals, he placed 29th in 1972, ninth in 1976 and ninth in 1980. In world championship all-arounds, he was 15th in 1974, 12th in 1978 and 18th in 1979.

Magyar retired after the 1980 Olympics. Since his departure, he has focused on his lifelong goal as a veterinarian. He currently operates a vet hospital and still resides in Budapest.

In May 2012, Magyar was inducted to the International Gymnastics Hall of Fame.

Awards
Preceded by Géza Csapó	Hungarian Sportsman of The Year; 1974	Succeeded by András Hargitay
Preceded by Pál Gerevich	Hungarian Sportsman of The Year; 1978	Succeeded by Tamás Wichmann
Preceded by Tamás Wichmann	Hungarian Sportsman of The Year; 1980	Succeeded by Sándor Wladár
