= Vladimir Tikhonov (gymnast) =

Russian gymnast

- Full name: Vladimir Valeryevich Tikhonov
- Born: 31 October 1956 (age 69) Grozny, Russian SFSR, Soviet Union
- Height: 1.69 m (5 ft 7 in)

Gymnastics career
- Discipline: Men's artistic gymnastics
- Country represented: Soviet Union
- Club: Dynamo Rostov-na-Donu
Medal record
Men's artistic gymnastics
Representing Soviet Union
Olympic Games
Silver medal – second place	1976 Montreal	Team
European Championships
Gold medal – first place	1977 Vilnius	Parallel bars
Bronze medal – third place	1977 Vilnius	All-around
Bronze medal – third place	1977 Vilnius	Floor exercise
Bronze medal – third place	1977 Vilnius	Rings

Vladimir Valeryevich Tikhonov (born 31 October 1956) is a Russian gymnast. He competed in eight events at the 1976 Summer Olympics, winning a silver medal in the team event.
