= Giovanni Carminucci =

Italian artistic gymnast (1939–2007)

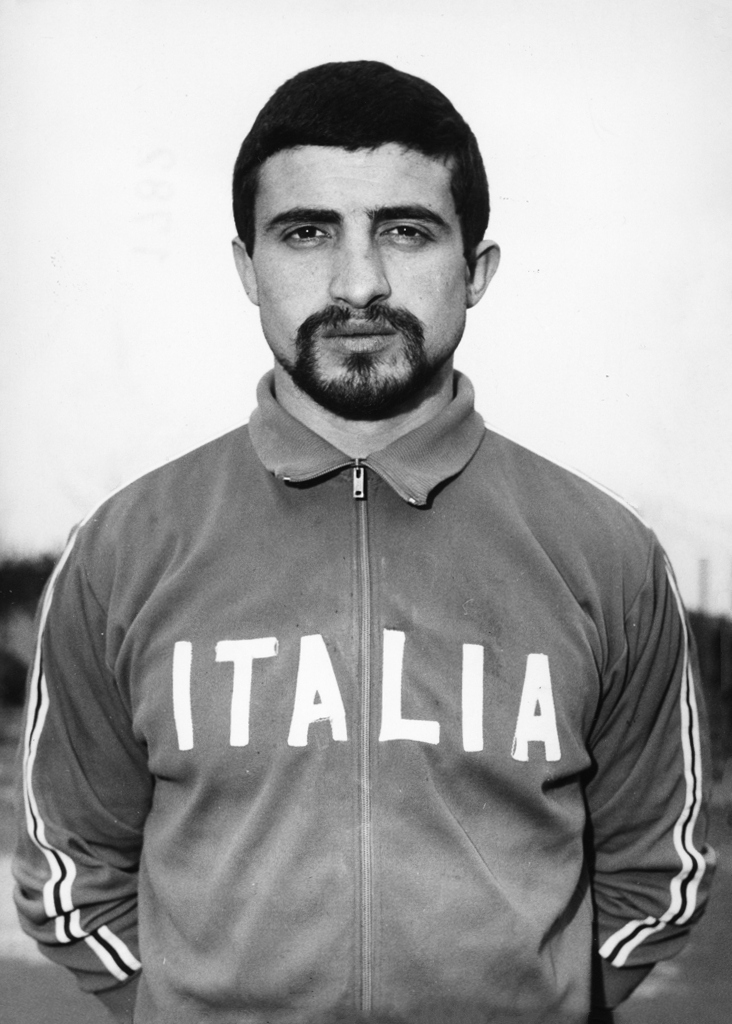

Personal information
- Born: November 14, 1939
- Died: February 17, 2007 (aged 67)
- Height: 1.69 m (5 ft 7 in)

Gymnastics career
- Discipline: Men's artistic gymnastics
- Country represented: Italy
Medal record
Representing Italy
Olympic Games
| Silver medal – second place | 1960 Rome | Parallel bars |
| Bronze medal – third place | 1960 Rome | Team competition |
European championships
| Gold medal – first place | 1961 Luxembourg | Vault |
| Gold medal – first place | 1963 Belgrade | Parallel bars |
| Gold medal – first place | 1971 Madrid | Parallel bars |
| Bronze medal – third place | 1961 Luxembourg | Parallel bars |
| Bronze medal – third place | 1961 Luxembourg | All-around |
| Bronze medal – third place | 1967 Tampere | Parallel bars |

Giovanni Carminucci (14 November 1939 – 17 February 2007) was an Italian gymnast. Together with his elder brother Pasquale he competed in all artistic gymnastics events at the 1960, 1964 and 1968 Olympics and won two medals in 1960: an individual silver in the parallel bars and a team bronze medal; his team placed fourth in 1964.
