= Eberhard Gienger =

German gymnast and politician (born 1951)

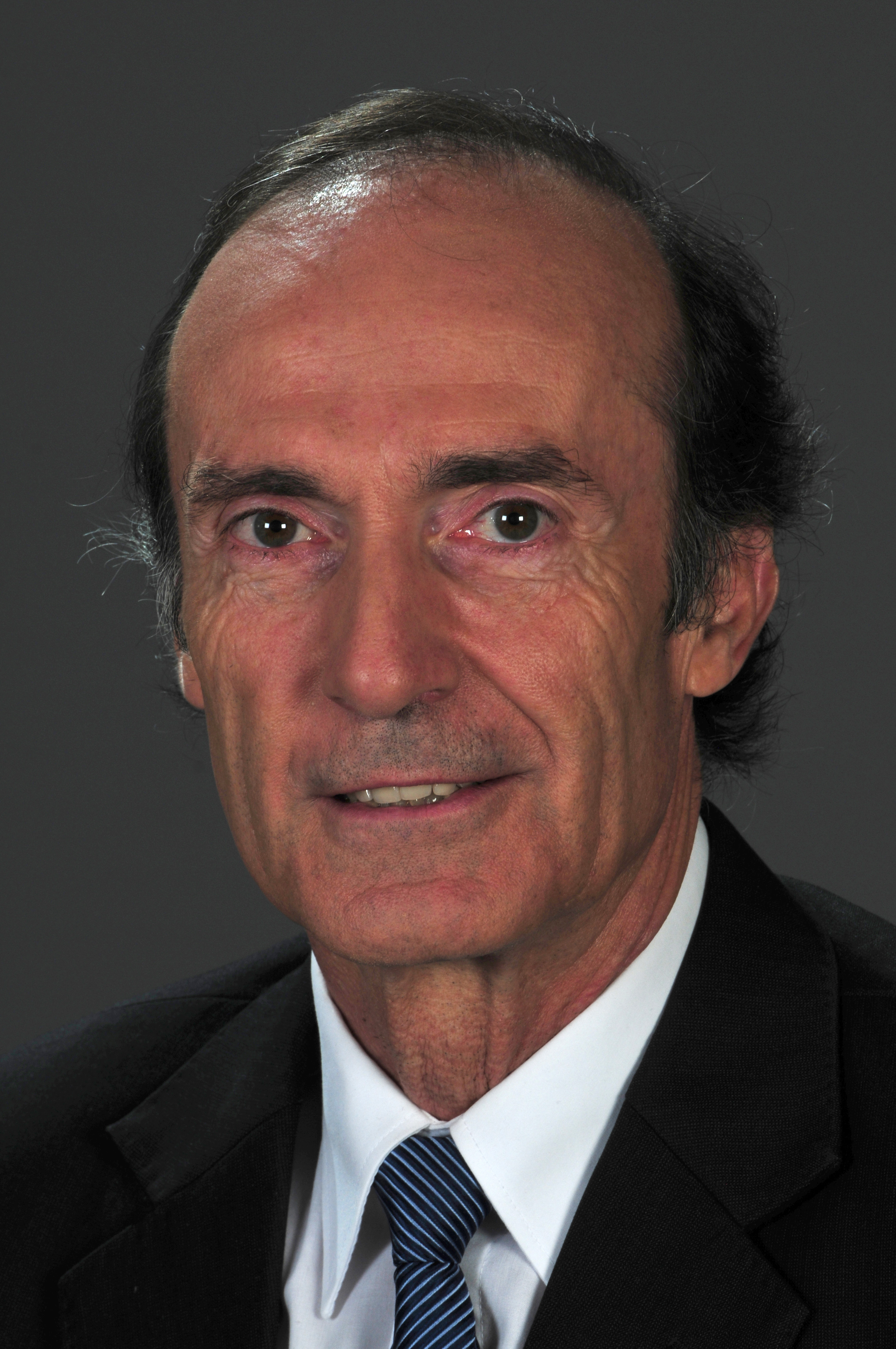
- Gienger in 2007

Personal information
- Born: 21 July 1951 (age 75) Künzelsau, West Germany
- Height: 176 cm (5 ft 9 in)

Gymnastics career
- Discipline: Men's artistic gymnastics
- Country represented: West Germany
- Eponymous skills: Gienger salto
Medal record
Olympic Games
| Bronze medal – third place | 1976 Montreal | Horizontal bar |
World Championships
| Gold medal – first place | 1974 Varna | Horizontal bar |
| Silver medal – second place | 1978 Strasbourg | Pommel horse |
| Silver medal – second place | 1978 Strasbourg | Horizontal bar |
| Silver medal – second place | 1981 Moscow | Horizontal bar |
European Championships
| Gold medal – first place | 1973 Grenoble | Horizontal bar |
| Gold medal – first place | 1975 Berne | Horizontal bar |
| Gold medal – first place | 1981 Rome | Horizontal bar |
| Silver medal – second place | 1975 Berne | All-around |
| Silver medal – second place | 1977 Vilnius | Parallel bars |
| Bronze medal – third place | 1975 Berne | Pommel horse |
| Bronze medal – third place | 1979 Essen | Parallel bars |
| Bronze medal – third place | 1981 Rome | Parallel bars |

Member of the Bundestag; for Neckar-Zaber
- In office 17 October 2002 – 26 October 2021
- Preceded by: Hans Martin Bury
- Succeeded by: Fabian Gramling

Personal details
- Party: Christian Democratic Union

Eberhard Gienger (German pronunciation: [ˈeːbɐhaʁt ˈɡiŋɐ]; born 21 July 1951) is a German former politician (CDU) and West German former gymnast. He competed at the 1972 and 1976 Summer Olympics, winning bronze in the latter.

== Gymnastics career ==
During his gymnastics career from 1971 to 1981, Gienger won 36 German championship titles; one gold and three silver medals in world championships; three gold, two silver and two bronze medals in European championships, and one Olympic bronze medal.

Gienger was an outstanding high bar artist: He won the European Championships in 1973, 1975 and 1981; he won gold in the 1974 World Championships, and won the bronze medal in the 1976 Olympic Games. For these feats, he was elected German Sportsman of the Year in 1974 and 1978. The Gienger salto on the high bar and on the uneven bars is named after him.

== Political career ==
Gienger was a member of the German National Olympic Committee from 1986 to 2006, and since 2006 has been the Vice President of the Deutscher Olympischer Sportbund, the successor organization to the German NOC.

Gienger entered politics in 2001 and became a member of the Christian Democratic Union. He was elected a member of the German Parliament in the 2002 elections, representing the Neckar-Zaber electoral district of the southern German state of Baden-Württemberg. In parliament, he has since been serving on the Committee on Sports and the Committee on Education, Research and Technology Assessment. In February 2020, Gienger announced he would not seek reelection in the 2021 German federal election.
