= 1973 European Men's Artistic Gymnastics Championships =

10th European Men's Artistic Gymnastics Championships
- Location: Grenoble, France
- Start date: 12 May 1973
- End date: 13 May 1973

The 10th European Men's Artistic Gymnastics Championships was held in Grenoble, France from 12–13 May 1973.

== Medalists ==
Event	Gold	Silver	Bronze
All-around	(Soviet Union) Viktor Klimenko	(Soviet Union) Nikolai Andrianov	(East Germany) Klaus Köste
Floor	(Soviet Union) Nikolai Andrianov	(Soviet Union) Viktor Klimenko	(East Germany) Klaus Köste
Pommel horse	(Hungary) Zoltán Magyar	(Poland) Wilhelm Kubica	(Soviet Union) Viktor Klimenko
Rings	(Soviet Union) Viktor Klimenko	(Soviet Union) Nikolai Andrianov (Romania) Dan Grecu	Not awarded
Vault	(Soviet Union) Nikolai Andrianov	(Poland) Andrzej Szajna	(Hungary) Imre Molnár
Parallel bars	(Soviet Union) Viktor Klimenko	(Soviet Union) Nikolai Andrianov (Finland) Mauno Nissinen	Not awarded
Horizontal bar	(West Germany) Eberhard Gienger (East Germany) Klaus Köste	Not awarded	(East Germany) Wolfgang Thüne

=== Medal table ===
Rank	Nation	Gold	Silver	Bronze	Total
1	Soviet Union (URS)	5	4	1	10
2	East Germany (GDR)	1	0	3	4
3	Hungary (HUN)	1	0	1	2
4	West Germany (FRG)	1	0	0	1
5	Poland (POL)	0	2	0	2
6	Finland (FIN)	0	1	0	1
6	Romania (ROM)	0	1	0	1
Totals (7 entries)		8	8	5	21
