= 1971 European Men's Artistic Gymnastics Championships =

9th European Men's Artistic Gymnastics Championships
- Location: Madrid, Spain
- Start date: 14 May 1971
- End date: 15 May 1971

The 9th European Men's Artistic Gymnastics Championships was held in Madrid, Spain from 14–15 May 1971.

== Medalists ==
Event	Gold	Silver	Bronze
All-around	(Soviet Union) Viktor Klimenko	(Soviet Union) Mikhail Voronin	(Soviet Union) Nikolai Andrianov
Floor	(Bulgaria) Raycho Khristov	(Spain) José Ginés	(Soviet Union) Nikolai Andrianov
Pommel horse	(Soviet Union) Nikolai Andrianov	(East Germany) Matthias Brehme	(Soviet Union) Mikhail Voronin
Rings	(Soviet Union) Mikhail Voronin	(Soviet Union) Nikolai Andrianov	(Poland) Andrzej Szajna
Vault	(Soviet Union) Nikolai Andrianov	(Poland) Andrzej Szajna	(East Germany) Klaus Köste
Parallel bars	(Italy) Giovanni Carminucci	(Soviet Union) Nikolai Andrianov (East Germany) Klaus Köste (Soviet Union) Mikhail Voronin	Not awarded
Horizontal bar	(East Germany) Klaus Köste	(Soviet Union) Mikhail Voronin	(Switzerland) Roland Hürzeler

=== Medal table ===
Rank	Nation	Gold	Silver	Bronze	Total
1	Soviet Union (URS)	4	5	3	12
2	East Germany (GDR)	1	2	1	4
3	Bulgaria (BUL)	1	0	0	1
3	Italy (ITA)	1	0	0	1
5	Poland (POL)	0	1	1	2
6	Spain (ESP)	0	1	0	1
7	Switzerland (SUI)	0	0	1	1
Totals (7 entries)		7	9	6	22
