= Vladimir Markelov (gymnast) =

Russian artistic gymnast (1957–2023)

- Владимир Николаевич Маркелов
- Full name: Vladimir Nikolayevich Markelov
- Born: 24 October 1957 Chelyabinsk, Russian SFSR, Soviet Union
- Died: 30 October 2023 (aged 66)
- Height: 1.67 m (5 ft 6 in)

Gymnastics career
- Discipline: Men's artistic gymnastics
- Country represented: Soviet Union
- Club: CSKA Moscow
Medal record
Men's artistic gymnastics
Representing Soviet Union
Olympic Games
Gold medal – first place	1980 Moscow	Team
Silver medal – second place	1976 Montreal	Team
World Championships
Gold medal – first place	1979 Fort Worth	Team
Silver medal – second place	1978 Strasbourg	Team
European Championships
Gold medal – first place	1977 Vilnius	All-around
Gold medal – first place	1977 Vilnius	Rings
Silver medal – second place	1977 Vilnius	Floor exercise
Silver medal – second place	1977 Vilnius	Horizontal bar
Bronze medal – third place	1977 Vilnius	Pommel horse
Bronze medal – third place	1977 Vilnius	Vault

Vladimir Nikolayevich Markelov (Russian: Владимир Николаевич Маркелов; 24 October 1957 – 30 October 2023) was a Russian gymnast who competed in the 1976 Summer Olympics and in the 1980 Summer Olympics. He was also part of the gold medal-winning Soviet team at the 1979 World Championships and the silver medal-winning team in 1978. Markelov died on 30 October 2023, at the age of 66.
