= Yuri Korolyov =

Russian artistic gymnast (1962–2023)

- Юрий Королёв
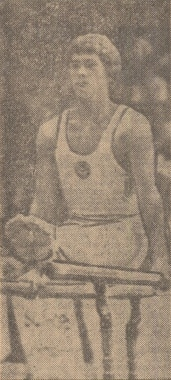
- Full name: Yuri Nikolayevich Korolyov
- Born: 25 August 1962 Vladimir, Russian SFSR, Soviet Union
- Died: 29 April 2023 (aged 60) Vladimir, Russia

Gymnastics career
- Discipline: Men's artistic gymnastics
- Country represented: Soviet Union
Medal record
World Championships
Gold medal – first place	1981 Moscow	Team
Gold medal – first place	1981 Moscow	All-around
Gold medal – first place	1981 Moscow	Floor Exercise
Gold medal – first place	1985 Montreal	Team
Gold medal – first place	1985 Montreal	All-around
Gold medal – first place	1985 Montreal	Rings
Gold medal – first place	1985 Montreal	Vault
Gold medal – first place	1987 Rotterdam	Team
Gold medal – first place	1987 Rotterdam	Rings
Silver medal – second place	1983 Budapest	Team
Silver medal – second place	1985 Montreal	Floor Exercise
Silver medal – second place	1987 Rotterdam	All-around
Bronze medal – third place	1981 Moscow	Pommel Horse
European Championships
Gold medal – first place	1981 Rome	Floor Exercise
Gold medal – first place	1981 Rome	Rings
Gold medal – first place	1983 Varna	Floor Exercise
Gold medal – first place	1983 Varna	Parallel Bars
Gold medal – first place	1987 Moscow	Vault
Silver medal – second place	1981 Rome	Individual All-Around
Silver medal – second place	1981 Rome	Pommel Horse
Silver medal – second place	1981 Rome	Vault
Silver medal – second place	1983 Varna	Individual All-Around
Silver medal – second place	1983 Varna	Pommel Horse
Silver medal – second place	1987 Moscow	Individual All-Around
Silver medal – second place	1987 Moscow	Floor Exercise
Bronze medal – third place	1983 Varna	Vault
World Cup
Gold medal – first place	1982 Zagreb	Parallel Bars
Gold medal – first place	1986 Beijing	All-Around
Gold medal – first place	1986 Beijing	Rings
Gold medal – first place	1986 Beijing	Vault
Gold medal – first place	1986 Beijing	Horizontal Bar
Silver medal – second place	1982 Zagreb	Floor Exercise
Silver medal – second place	1982 Zagreb	Pommel Horse
Silver medal – second place	1982 Zagreb	Parallel Rings
Silver medal – second place	1986 Beijing	Floor Exercise
Bronze medal – third place	1982 Zagreb	All-Around
Bronze medal – third place	1982 Zagreb	Vault
Bronze medal – third place	1986 Beijing	Parallel Bars
Goodwill Games
Gold medal – first place	1986 Moscow	Team
Gold medal – first place	1986 Moscow	All-Around
Gold medal – first place	1986 Moscow	Floor Exercise
Gold medal – first place	1986 Moscow	Rings
Gold medal – first place	1986 Moscow	Horizontal Bar
Silver medal – second place	1986 Moscow	Pommel Horse

Yuri Nikolayevich Korolyov (Russian: Юрий Николаевич Королёв; 25 August 1962 – 29 April 2023) was a Soviet artistic gymnast who competed during the 1980s, winning many World and European Medals. Part of a deep Soviet team that, throughout the 1980s, featured such names as Dmitry Bilozerchev, Valeri Liukin, Vladimir Artemov, Valentin Mogilny, and others, Korolyov still managed to distinguish himself for the greater part of the decade by becoming World All-Around Champion in 1981 and 1985, World Cup All-Around Co-Champion (with Li Ning) in 1986, and by winning many other titles and medals at the continental and world level.

== 1981–1984 ==
Korolyov was coached by Alexander Fedorov at the Spartak club. Among the qualities most associated with his gymnastics and as a competitor in general, he has been described as both a consummate all-arounder and cool competitor. His routines were…often were completed with a cat-like dismount landing. His contemporary, Olympic Champion USA gymnast Bart Conner said about him nobody can out compete him.

As Korolyov had been winning many titles and medals for years as a Junior at such competitions as the Jr. USSR Championships and Jr. European Championships, it was no surprise that his senior debut in 1981 would be quite major. At that year's 1981 European Gymnastics Championships in Rome, where he became the first gymnast to compete in a triple back dismount from the Rings as well as a full-twisting double layout dismount from the High Bar, he won the silver medal in the Individual All-Around, as well as taking 4 out of a possible 6 event finals medals – 2 gold and 2 silver.

He was no less successful at that year's World Championships in Moscow, where his consistent, strong performances (highest 6-event composite score in the team compulsory segment of the competition, highest 12-event composite score throughout both segments of the team composition) won him the all-around title by a narrow margin over teammate, reigning World Cup All-Around Champion (1980) Bogdan Makuts. Contemporaneous coverage by The New York Times described the closeness of the competition.

Makuts looked as if he would capture the title after scoring a perfect 10 on the horizontal bars, the fourth exercise of the program, to go ahead of Korolyov, who scored a 9.9. … But Korolyov scored a 9.95 to win the event by a quarter of [a tenth of] a point.

In the event finals at these 1981 World Championships, in addition to his all-around victory, he also won two medals in the apparatus finals, both being ties - gold on floor with China's Li Yuejiu, who in 1983 in Budapest, Hungary would help his team to their first-ever world championship team title, and bronze on pommel horse with Hungary's György Guczoghy (winner of 13 medals at the continental, World Championship, and Olympic level). Korolyov was the youngest Men's World All-Around Artistic Gymnastics Champion up to that point.

The next year, he continued to be the first, or of among the first, male gymnasts to successfully compete more difficult moves, such as doing a handstand in the middle of a Pommel Horse routine as well as doing consecutive repetitions of the Tkatchev release move on High Bar at the 1982 World Cup in Zagreb, Yugoslavia (today’s Croatia), where yet more strong performances helped him to 3rd place in the All-Around competition behind PRC gymnasts Li Ning (1st) and Tong Fei (2nd). He would also take 5 out of a possible 6 medals in the event finals (Parallel Bars title, plus 3 silvers and a bronze).

In 1983, he managed to place 2nd to Bilozerchev in the All-Around at that year's European Championships in Varna, as well as winning 2 event titles (floor, shared with Plamen Petkov of Bulgaria, and parallel bars). But a disastrous performance on high bar (score of 8.85) in the team compulsories segment of competition at that year's World Championships in Budapest dropped him to 5th on the Soviet team, although his 6-event team composite score in team optionals was second, among his teammates, to Bilozerchev's. Not being among the top 3 men on his team, he did not qualify to the individual all-around final, nor did he win a medal on any of the 3 individual event finals to which he qualified. Interesting to note is that although the Soviet team was able to throw out Korolyov's 8.85 high bar score (their other 5 scores were all 9.7 or above), they still lost the world team title to China by only .100 (a very small margin in a team competition), and this was the only World or Olympic team title the Soviet men would lose at a non-boycotted world championships or Olympics from 1979 to 1992.

In 1984, any hopes Korolyov would have realistically entertained about any Olympic successes were dashed by the Soviet-led boycott. Subsequently, his father's death prevented him from participating in the Alternate Olympics later that year.

== 1985–1989 ==
The beginning of this quadrennium saw Korolyov make a successful resurgence back onto the international competitive scene as he clinched the All-Around title by a margin of .300 over Soviet teammate Vladimir Artemov at the 1985 World Championships in Montreal. With Bilozerchev (who had won the European All-Around Title earlier that year) unfortunately sidelined because of a severe leg injury sustained in a car accident, Korolyov had more free rein to collect medals at this competition, where he also won 3 of the 6 individual event titles.

Like the midpoint year in the preceding quadrennium, 1986 was another stellar year for Korolyov, as he won or co-won the All-Around at that year's 2 most significant international competitions. At that year's World Cup in Beijing, he shared the All-Around title with China’s Li Ning and also had great successes in the individual event finals winning 3 golds and 2 silvers. Also, that year, at the first Goodwill Games in Moscow, among a deep international field that included eventual Olympic All-Around Champion (1988) Vladimir Artemov and deceased eventual European and World All-Around Medalist Valentin Mogilny, Korolyov won the All-Around title again by a huge margin of .600. He logged the highest 6-event composite score in the preliminaries as well as again in the All-Around final, truly dominating the competition. That dominance stretched over into event finals as well where he snared 3 out of the 6 individual event titles.

1987 saw Korolyov even better-poised to go into the succeeding year's Olympics than at the same point in time in the previous quadrennium. Despite the very successful return of Bilozerchev and the rise of younger Soviet stars such as Valeri Liukin and Valentin Mogilny, Korolyov still managed to win his 3rd European All-Around Silver Medal, behind Liukin, at that year's competition European Gymnastics Championships in Moscow, adding to that 1 gold and 1 silver in event finals. At the 1987 World Gymnastics Championships in Rotterdam, although Korolyov only qualified 4th among his Soviet teammates, his compatriot Liukin had to withdraw from the Individual All-Around because of an unfortunate knee injury, freeing Korolyov to compete in the All-Around final where he placed 2nd behind Bilozerchev and, buttressed by a perfect score of 10.00 on vault, even logged a higher 6-event composite score in the all-around final than Bilozerchev (or anybody else). (Under the New Life rules instituted two years later, he would have been World All-Around Champion.)

With the previous year's successes established, it looked like Korolyov would have another chance to finally prove himself on the world's biggest stage, the Olympics, but fate adversely intervened again when he injured his Achilles tendon at that year’s Soviet Olympic Trials, making his bid for the 1988 Seoul Olympics impossible.

After the 1988 Olympics, Korolyov kept competing. He almost made the 1989 World Championship team for the Soviets, but with yet more up-and comers in the Soviet system like Vitaly Marinich and Valery Belenky, he placed 7th at that year's USSR Championships and then retired.

== The most decorated non-Olympian in gymnastics ==
Korolyov is widely considered the most decorated or greatest gymnast of all time never to have made it to an Olympic games.

- With a total of 34 individual medals at World Championships, World Cups, and European Championships competitions, Korolyov had more such medals, as of 23 February 2008, than any other non-Olympian with Valentin Mogilny (17) being the next highest in this sort of medal count. Even stretching this medal count to include individual Olympic (Official or ‘Alternate’) medals, Korolyov's medal haul is tied with Alexander Dityatin for 3rd all-time for men behind Vitaly Scherbo (51) and Nikolai Andrianov (48). The non-Olympian woman gymnasts with the highest such medal hauls are the deceased 1978 World All-Around Champion Elena Mukhina, with 13, and her Soviet compatriot, 1985 World All-Around Co-Champion Oksana Omelianchik, with 11.
- His World Championship and World Cup individual medals tally of 21, as of 23 February 2008, was also far higher than any other non-Olympian with Valentin Mogilny being second.
- Even going strictly by individual World Championship individual medals alone, as of 23 February 2008, Korolyov had more (9) than any other non-Olympian, with Mogilny being the runner-up again with 6.
- Korolyov's 8 European / World Championship / World Cup / Olympic All-Around medals, as of 23 February 2008, was the 3rd highest ever among men, behind Scherbo and Andrianov who each have 9. Korolyov's 8 such All-Around medals also makes him the most prolific All-Around Medalist of the 1980s.
- Korolyov's 21 individual World Championship and World Cup medals, as of 23 February 2008, was the 2nd highest all-time among all male or female gymnasts, surpassed only by Scherbo's 26. Among these, 11 were gold and that, again, is surpassed, among all male or female non-Olympian gymnasts, only by Scherbo's 13.
- As of 13 April 2015, On WorldGymRank's list of the “50 Greatest Gymnasts of Our Time”, Yuri Korolyov is 8th all-time among the men in this weighted and detailed ranking system, a higher ranking in that system than any other male or female non-Olympian gymnast.

== Post-competitive career, accolades, and death ==
After Korolyov’s competitive career, he applied himself and took an international judge certification, at one point judging at the 2008 Beijing Summer Olympics. Also, he coached at the Vladimir Tolkachev Youth Sports School and was a coach and consultant for the national team.

Korolyov was awarded the distinctions of “Honored Master of Sports of the USSR” and “Order of the Red Banner of Labor”. Although Korolyov was inducted into the International Gymnastics Hall of Fame in 2010, he was unable to attend his induction until 2013.

On 28 April 2023, Korolyov held a training session, preparing two Vladimir athletes, both members of the national team, for the upcoming Russian Championship. Late that evening, Korolyov went into cardiac arrest and spent the night in intensive care, dying during the afternoon the day after. His death was described as " a great loss for the entire country."
