= Bohdan Makuts =

Ukrainian artistic gymnast (born 1960)

- Богдан Володимирович Макуц
- Full name: Bohdan Volodymyrovych Makuts
- Alternative names: Bogdan Vladimirovich Makuts; Богдан Владимирович Макуц
- Born: 4 April 1960 (age 66) Lviv, Ukrainian SSR, Soviet Union
- Height: 1.71 m (5 ft 7 in)

Gymnastics career
- Discipline: Men's artistic gymnastics
- Country represented: Soviet Union
- Club: Sportivny Klub Vooruzhyonny Sily Lviv
Medal record
Men's artistic gymnastics
Representing Soviet Union
Olympic Games
Gold medal – first place	1980 Moscow	Team
World Championships
Gold medal – first place	1979 Fort Worth	Team
Gold medal – first place	1981 Moscow	Team
Silver medal – second place	1981 Moscow	All-around
Silver medal – second place	1983 Budapest	Team
Bronze medal – third place	1981 Moscow	Rings
Bronze medal – third place	1981 Moscow	Vault
European Championships
Gold medal – first place	1979 Essen	Vault
Gold medal – first place	1979 Essen	Parallel bars
Gold medal – first place	1981 Rome	Vault
Gold medal – first place	1981 Rome	Parallel bars
Silver medal – second place	1979 Essen	All-around
Silver medal – second place	1979 Essen	Rings
Bronze medal – third place	1979 Essen	Pommel horse
Bronze medal – third place	1981 Rome	All-around
Bronze medal – third place	1981 Rome	Horizontal bar

Bohdan Volodymyrovych Makuts (born 4 April 1960) is a Ukrainian former gymnast who competed in the 1980 Summer Olympics. He was born in Lviv. He was also the all-around silver medalist, vault and rings bronze medallist in the 1981 world championships. He was part of the 1979,1981 and 1983 soviet world championship teams, winning one gold, and two silver team medals. He also became the 1980 world cup all-around champion.
