= Pavel Stolbov =

- Born: 30 August 1929
- Died: 16 June 2011 (aged 81)

Gymnastics career
- Discipline: Men's artistic gymnastics
- Country represented: Soviet Union
Medal record
Olympic Games
Gold medal – first place	1956 Melbourne	Team
World Championships
Gold medal – first place	1958 Moscow	Team
Silver medal – second place	1958 Moscow	Pommel horse
Silver medal – second place	1962 Prague	Horizontal bar
Silver medal – second place	1962 Prague	Team
Bronze medal – third place	1958 Moscow	Parallel bars

Pavel Stolbov (30 August 1929 – 16 June 2011) was a gymnast and Olympic champion who competed for the Soviet Union.

== Olympics ==
Stolbov competed at the 1956 Summer Olympics in Melbourne where he received a gold medal in team combined exercises with the Soviet team (Viktor Chukarin, Valentin Muratov, Boris Shakhlin, Albert Azaryan and Yuri Titov).

== World championships ==
Stolbov received an individual silver medal in pommel horse and bronze medal in parallel bars at the 1958 World Artistic Gymnastics Championships in Moscow, and a silver medal in horizontal bar at the 1962 World Artistic Gymnastics Championships in Prague.
