= György Guczoghy =

Hungarian gymnast (born 1962)

- Born: 3 March 1962 (age 64) Budapest, Hungarian People's Republic
- Height: 1.71 m (5 ft 7 in)
- Spouse: Lenke Almási

Gymnastics career
- Discipline: Men's artistic gymnastics
- Country represented: Hungary
- Club: Budapesti Honvéd Sportegyesület
Medal record
Men's artistic gymnastics
Representing Hungary
Olympic Games
Bronze medal – third place	1980 Moscow	Team
World Championships
Silver medal – second place	1983 Budapest	Pommel horse
Bronze medal – third place	1981 Moscow	Pommel horse
European Championships
Gold medal – first place	1979 Essen	Pommel horse
Gold medal – first place	1981 Rome	Pommel horse
Gold medal – first place	1983 Varna	Pommel horse
Silver medal – second place	1985 Oslo	Pommel horse
Bronze medal – third place	1983 Varna	All-around
Bronze medal – third place	1983 Varna	Floor exercise
Bronze medal – third place	1983 Varna	Rings
Bronze medal – third place	1983 Varna	Parallel bars
Bronze medal – third place	1987 Moscow	All-around
Bronze medal – third place	1987 Moscow	Floor exercise
Bronze medal – third place	1987 Moscow	Horizontal bar

György Guczoghy (born 3 March 1962) is a Hungarian gymnast. He received an Olympic bronze medal in gymnastics in 1980. He has also won a bronze and a silver on pommel horse at the World championship. He was named Hungarian Sportsman of The Year in 1983.

In 2012, together with Katalin Makray, József Harmath, and Antal Kisteleki, Guczoghy was inducted to the Hungarian Gymnastics Hall of Fame.

Awards
Preceded by Jenő Pap	Hungarian Sportsman of The Year; 1983	Succeeded by Tamás Gáspár
