= 1963 European Men's Artistic Gymnastics Championships =

5th European Men's Artistic Gymnastics Championships
- Location: Belgrade, Yugoslavia
- Start date: 6 July 1963
- End date: 7 July 1963

The 5th European Men's Artistic Gymnastics Championships was held in Belgrade, Yugoslavia from 6–7 July 1963.

== Medalists ==
Event	Gold	Silver	Bronze
All-around	(Socialist Federal Republic of Yugoslavia) Miroslav Cerar	(Soviet Union) Boris Shakhlin	(Soviet Union) Valery Kerdemelidi
Floor	(Italy) Franco Menichelli	(Soviet Union) Valery Kerdemelidi	(Socialist Federal Republic of Yugoslavia) Miroslav Cerar
Pommel horse	(Socialist Federal Republic of Yugoslavia) Miroslav Cerar	(Soviet Union) Valery Kerdemelidi	(Soviet Union) Boris Shakhlin
Rings	(Socialist Federal Republic of Yugoslavia) Miroslav Cerar (Bulgaria) Velik Kapsazov (Soviet Union) Boris Shakhlin	Not awarded	
Vault	(Czechoslovakia) Přemysl Krbec	(Socialist Federal Republic of Yugoslavia) Miroslav Cerar	(Soviet Union) Valery Kerdemelidi (Socialist Federal Republic of Yugoslavia) Tine Šrot
Parallel bars	(Italy) Giovanni Carminucci	(Soviet Union) Boris Shakhlin	(Italy) Franco Menichelli
Horizontal bar	(Socialist Federal Republic of Yugoslavia) Miroslav Cerar (Soviet Union) Boris Shakhlin	Not awarded	(Soviet Union) Valery Kerdemelidi

=== Medal table ===
Rank	Nation	Gold	Silver	Bronze	Total
1	Yugoslavia (YUG)	4	1	2	7
2	Soviet Union (URS)	2	4	4	10
3	Italy (ITA)	2	0	1	3
4	Bulgaria (BUL)	1	0	0	1
4	Czechoslovakia (TCH)	1	0	0	1
Totals (5 entries)		10	5	7	22
