= 1977 European Men's Artistic Gymnastics Championships =

12th European Men's Artistic Gymnastics Championships
- Location: Vilnius, Lithuanian SSR, Soviet Union
- Start date: 28 May 1977
- End date: 29 May 1977

The 12th European Men's Artistic Gymnastics Championships was held in Vilnius, Lithuanian SSR, Soviet Union from 28–29 May 1977.

== Medalists ==
Event	Gold	Silver	Bronze
All-around	(Soviet Union) Vladimir Markelov	(Soviet Union) Aleksandr Tkachyov	(Soviet Union) Vladimir Tikhonov
Floor	(Soviet Union) Aleksandr Tkachyov	(Soviet Union) Vladimir Markelov	(Soviet Union) Vladimir Tikhonov
Pommel horse	(Hungary) Zoltán Magyar	(East Germany) Michael Nikolay	(Soviet Union) Vladimir Markelov
Rings	(Soviet Union) Vladimir Markelov	(Soviet Union) Aleksandr Tkachyov	(Soviet Union) Vladimir Tikhonov
Vault	(East Germany) Ralph Bärthel (Czechoslovakia) Jiří Tabák	Not awarded	(Soviet Union) Vladimir Markelov
Parallel bars	(Soviet Union) Vladimir Tikhonov	(East Germany) Ralph Bärthel (West Germany) Eberhard Gienger	Not awarded
Horizontal bar	(Bulgaria) Stoyan Deltchev	(Soviet Union) Vladimir Markelov (Soviet Union) Aleksandr Tkachyov	Not awarded

=== Medal table ===
Rank	Nation	Gold	Silver	Bronze	Total
1	Soviet Union (URS)	4	5	5	14
2	East Germany (GDR)	1	2	0	3
3	Bulgaria (BUL)	1	0	0	1
3	Czechoslovakia (TCH)	1	0	0	1
3	Hungary (HUN)	1	0	0	1
6	West Germany (FRG)	0	1	0	1
Totals (6 entries)		8	8	5	21
