= 1981 European Men's Artistic Gymnastics Championships =

14th European Men's Artistic Gymnastics Championships
- Location: Rome, Italy
- Start date: 23 May 1981
- End date: 24 May 1981

The 14th European Men's Artistic Gymnastics Championships was held in Rome, Italy from 23–24 May 1981.

== Medalists ==
Event	Gold	Silver	Bronze
All-around	(Soviet Union) Aleksandr Tkachyov	(Soviet Union) Yuri Korolyov	(Soviet Union) Bohdan Makuts
Floor	(East Germany) Roland Brückner (Soviet Union) Yuri Korolyov	Not awarded	(Soviet Union) Aleksandr Tkachyov
Pommel horse	(Hungary) György Guczoghy	(France) Michel Boutard (Soviet Union) Yuri Korolyov (Romania) Kurt Szilier	Not awarded
Rings	(Soviet Union) Yuri Korolyov	(Italy) Rocco Amboni	(Soviet Union) Aleksandr Tkachyov
Vault	(Soviet Union) Bohdan Makuts	(Soviet Union) Yuri Korolyov	(Italy) Rocco Amboni
Parallel bars	(Soviet Union) Bohdan Makuts	(Soviet Union) Aleksandr Tkachyov	(West Germany) Eberhard Gienger (East Germany) Lutz Hoffmann
Horizontal bar	(West Germany) Eberhard Gienger (Soviet Union) Aleksandr Tkachyov	Not awarded	(Soviet Union) Bohdan Makuts

=== Medal table ===
Rank	Nation	Gold	Silver	Bronze	Total
1	Soviet Union (URS)	6	4	4	14
2	East Germany (GDR)	1	0	1	2
2	West Germany (FRG)	1	0	1	2
4	Hungary (HUN)	1	0	0	1
5	Italy (ITA)	0	1	1	2
6	France (FRA)	0	1	0	1
6	Romania (ROM)	0	1	0	1
Totals (7 entries)		9	7	7	23
