= Valentin Mogilny =

Soviet artistic gymnast (1965–2015)

- Валентин Могильный

Personal information
- Born: 18 December 1965 Kokhanivka, Dnipropetrovsk Oblast, Ukrainian SSR, USSR
- Died: 22 November 2015 (aged 49) France

Gymnastics career
- Discipline: Men's artistic gymnastics
- Country represented: Soviet Union
Medal record
Representing Soviet Union
World Championships
Gold medal – first place	1985 Montreal	Team
Gold medal – first place	1985 Montreal	Pommel horse
Gold medal – first place	1985 Montreal	Parallel bars
Gold medal – first place	1989 Stuttgart	Team
Gold medal – first place	1989 Stuttgart	Pommel horse
Silver medal – second place	1989 Stuttgart	All-Around
World Cup Final
Gold medal – first place	1986 Beijing	Rings
Gold medal – first place	1986 Beijing	Parallel bars
Silver medal – second place	1986 Beijing	Pommel horse
European Championships
Gold medal – first place	1987 Moscow	Rings
Gold medal – first place	1989 Stockholm	Pommel horse
Gold medal – first place	1989 Stockholm	Vault
Gold medal – first place	1990 Lausanne	All-around
Gold medal – first place	1990 Lausanne	Pommel horse
Gold medal – first place	1990 Lausanne	Parallel bars
Silver medal – second place	1985 Oslo	All-around
Silver medal – second place	1985 Oslo	Rings
Silver medal – second place	1989 Stockholm	All-around
Bronze medal – third place	1989 Stockholm	Parallel bars

Valentin Viktorovich Mogilny (Russian: Валентин Викторович Могильный; 18 December 1965 – 22 November 2015) was an artistic gymnast who competed for the USSR during the 1980s. His teammates were Yuri Korolev, Dmitri Bilozerchev, Valeri Liukin, and Vladimir Artemov. He trained at the Army Club in Leninsk-Kuznetsky, then moved to Moscow to work with coach Alexander Alexandrov. Mogilny was divorced from his wife Olga Bicherova (1981 world champion), with whom he had a son. Mogilny lived his last years in France, where he became a citizen, and worked as a coach. He died after a heart attack in 2015.
