= 1983 European Men's Artistic Gymnastics Championships =

15th European Men's Artistic Gymnastics Championships
- Location: Varna, Bulgaria
- Start date: 28 May 1983
- End date: 29 May 1983

The 15th European Men's Artistic Gymnastics Championships was held in Varna, Bulgaria from 28–29 May 1983.

== Medalists ==
Event	Gold	Silver	Bronze
All-around	(Soviet Union) Dmitry Bilozerchev	(Soviet Union) Yuri Korolyov	(Hungary) György Guczoghy
Floor	(Soviet Union) Yuri Korolyov (Bulgaria) Plamen Petkov	Not awarded	(East Germany) Jens Fischer (Hungary) György Guczoghy (France) Philippe Vatuone
Pommel horse	(Hungary) György Guczoghy	(Soviet Union) Yuri Korolyov (Soviet Union) Alexander Pogorelov	Not awarded
Rings	(Soviet Union) Dmitry Bilozerchev (Bulgaria) Plamen Petkov	Not awarded	(Hungary) György Guczoghy (Switzerland) Sepp Zellweger (Romania) Levente Molnár
Vault	(Soviet Union) Dmitry Bilozerchev	(East Germany) Norbert Brylok	(Soviet Union) Yuri Korolyov
Parallel bars	(Soviet Union) Yuri Korolyov	(Bulgaria) Borislav Hutov	(Hungary) György Guczoghy
Horizontal bar	(Soviet Union) Dmitry Bilozerchev	(East Germany) Norbert Brylok	(France) Philippe Vatuone

=== Medal table ===
Rank	Nation	Gold	Silver	Bronze	Total
1	Soviet Union (URS)	6	3	1	10
2	Bulgaria (BUL)	2	1	0	3
3	Hungary (HUN)	1	0	4	5
4	East Germany (GDR)	0	2	1	3
5	France (FRA)	0	0	2	2
6	Romania (ROM)	0	0	1	1
6	Switzerland (SUI)	0	0	1	1
Totals (7 entries)		9	6	10	25
