= 1979 European Men's Artistic Gymnastics Championships =

13th European Men's Artistic Gymnastics Championships
- Location: Essen, West Germany
- Start date: 18 May 1979
- End date: 19 May 1979

The 13th European Men's Artistic Gymnastics Championships was held in Essen, West Germany from 18–19 May 1979.

== Medalists ==
Event	Gold	Silver	Bronze
All-around	(Bulgaria) Stoyan Deltchev	(Soviet Union) Bohdan Makuts (Soviet Union) Aleksandr Tkachyov	Not awarded
Floor	(Bulgaria) Stoyan Deltchev	(East Germany) Ralph Bärthel	(East Germany) Lutz Mack
Pommel horse	(Soviet Union) Alexander Dityatin (Hungary) György Guczoghy	Not awarded	(France) Michel Boutard (Soviet Union) Bohdan Makuts
Rings	(Soviet Union) Alexander Dityatin	(Soviet Union) Bohdan Makuts	(East Germany) Lutz Mack
Vault	(Soviet Union) Bohdan Makuts	(Czechoslovakia) Jozef Konečný	(East Germany) Ralph Bärthel (Bulgaria) Stoyan Deltchev
Parallel bars	(Soviet Union) Bohdan Makuts	(Soviet Union) Alexander Dityatin	(France) Henri Boério (West Germany) Eberhard Gienger
Horizontal bar	(Soviet Union) Aleksandr Tkachyov	(Bulgaria) Stoyan Deltchev (Hungary) Péter Kovács	Not awarded

=== Medal table ===
Rank	Nation	Gold	Silver	Bronze	Total
1	Soviet Union (URS)	5	4	1	10
2	Bulgaria (BUL)	2	1	1	4
3	Hungary (HUN)	1	1	0	2
4	East Germany (GDR)	0	1	3	4
5	Czechoslovakia (TCH)	0	1	0	1
6	France (FRA)	0	0	2	2
7	West Germany (FRG)	0	0	1	1
Totals (7 entries)		8	8	8	24
