= Klaus Köste =

East German gymnast (1943–2012)

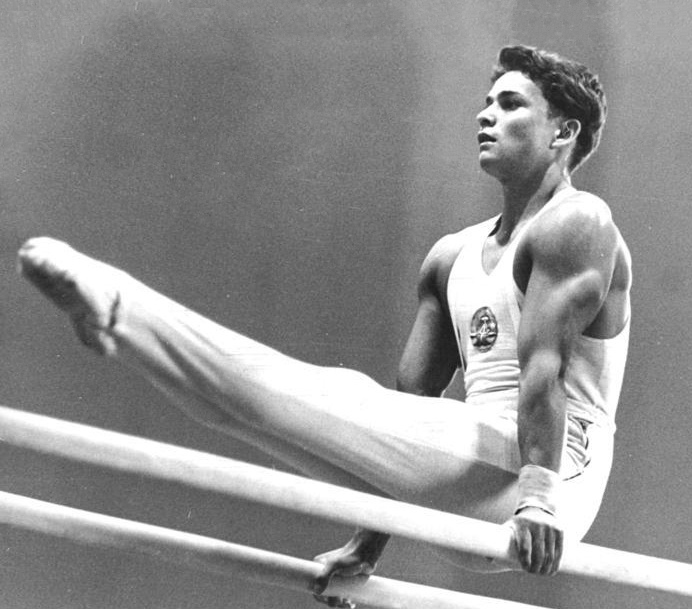
- Köste in 1963

Personal information
- Born: 27 February 1943 Frankfurt an der Oder, Germany
- Died: 14 December 2012 (aged 69) Leipzig, Germany
- Height: 1.64 m (5 ft 5 in)

Gymnastics career
- Discipline: Men's artistic gymnastics
- Country represented: East Germany
Medal record
Men's artistic gymnastics
Representing East Germany
Olympic Games
Gold medal – first place	1972 Munich	Vault
Bronze medal – third place	1968 Mexico City	Team
Bronze medal – third place	1972 Munich	Team
World championships
Bronze medal – third place	1970 Ljubljana	Team
Bronze medal – third place	1970 Ljubljana	Horizontal bar
Representing Germany
Olympic Games
Bronze medal – third place	1964 Tokyo	Team

Klaus Köste (27 February 1943 – 14 December 2012) was a German gymnast. He won a gold medal in the vault at the 1972 Summer Olympics in Munich. He competed for East Germany and won bronze medals in the team all-around event in three Olympics, in 1964, 1968 and 1972. He was particularly strong on the horizontal bar, winning the 1971 and 1973 European championships and a bronze medal at the 1970 World Championship in this event.

Köste started training in gymnastics at the age of six in Frankfurt (Oder), but later moved to Leipzig, where he lived for the rest of his life. During his career, he won 34 national titles, becoming one of the most successful German gymnasts, together with Eberhard Gienger. In 1972 he was awarded the Patriotic Order of Merit. He retired from competitions in 1974 due to an Achilles tendon injury and became a trainer and high school teacher. In 1974–1976, he was the head coach of the East German women’s team and between 1976 and 1985 worked as the chief trainer of SC Leipzig. In parallel he taught sports at DHfK Leipzig. During the period of 1998–2002 he was an assistant to Gustav-Adolf Schur who was when a member of the Bundestag. He died of heart failure in 2012.
