= Viktor Klimenko (gymnast) =

Soviet gymnast (born 1949)

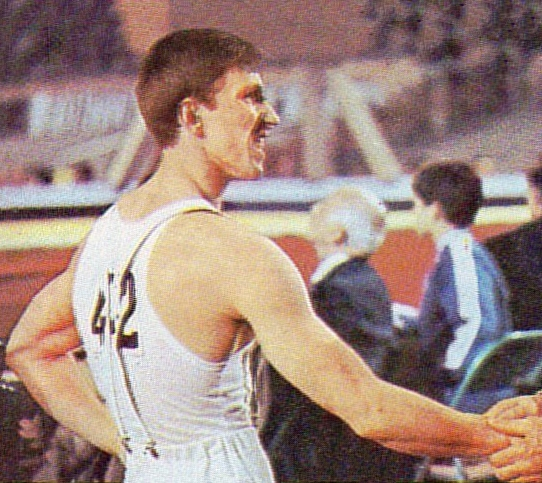

Personal information
- Born: 25 February 1949 (age 77) Moscow, Russian SFSR, Soviet Union
- Height: 169 cm (5 ft 7 in)

Gymnastics career
- Discipline: Men's artistic gymnastics
- Country represented: Soviet Union
- Club: Dynamo Moscow; Soviet Army Moscow
Medal record
Olympic Games
Gold medal – first place	1972 Munich	Pommel horse
Silver medal – second place	1968 Mexico City	Team
Silver medal – second place	1972 Munich	Vault
Silver medal – second place	1972 Munich	Team
Bronze medal – third place	1968 Mexico City	Parallel bars
World Championships
Silver medal – second place	1970 Ljubljana	Vault
Silver medal – second place	1970 Ljubljana	Team
Silver medal – second place	1974 Varna	Team
Bronze medal – third place	1970 Ljubljana	Pommel horse

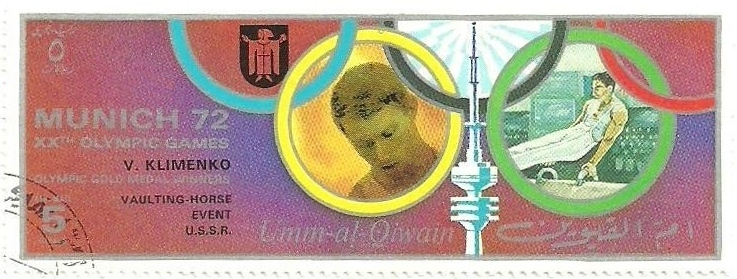
Klimenko on a stamp of Umm al-Quwain

Viktor Yakovlevich Klimenko (Russian: Виктор Яковлевич Клименко, born 25 February 1949) is a retired Russian gymnast. He competed for the Soviet Union at the 1968 and 1972 Olympics and won a team silver medal on each occasion. Individually he earned a bronze medal in parallel bars in 1968, as well as a gold medal in pommel horse and a silver medal in vault in 1972. At the world championships Klimenko collected four medals in 1970–1974. His wife Larisa Petrik is also an Olympic gymnast.
