= European Men's Artistic Gymnastics Championships =

The European Men's Artistic Gymnastics Championships are an annual series of artistic gymnastics championships for male gymnasts from European countries organised by European Gymnastics. They take place in two biennial formats; in even years they take place in tandem with a junior men's competition, and historically have included a team event, but not an individual all-around. In odd years, they are held in tandem with the European Women's Artistic Gymnastics Championships, and historically included an individual all-around final but not a team competition. These events are sometimes called the European Individual Artistic Gymnastics Championships. Despite the alternating formats, all winners are considered European champions with one medal table.

In recent editions of both formats, the 'missing' event has been held as part of the qualification process; in the case of the Men's Artistic Gymnastics Championships, a men's individual all-around competition is held as part of the apparatus and team finals qualification stage.

The event is not to be confused with the gymnastics program of the European Games, whose champions are crowned as European Games gold medalists, but not European champions.

== History ==
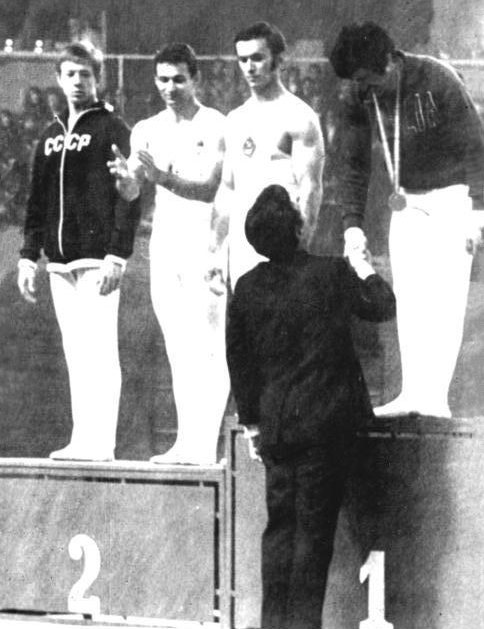
9th European Gymnastics Championships for men in Madrid 14th and 15th May 1971. The medal ceremony for the parallel bars, from right to left: the Italian Giovanni Carminucci (gold), and Mikhail Voronin from the USSR, Klaus Köste from the GDR and Nikolai Andrianov from the USSR (all silver).

Originally held biannually and in odd-numbered years, the championships moved to even-numbered years in 1990. In 2005 a second set of championships was introduced, titled the "individual championships". Although numbered as a separate event, winners in either event are considered European champions, and the championships as a result have in effect become an annual event, but in two formats; in even-numbered years, a stand-alone men's event incorporates the European Junior Artistic Gymnastics championships (an entirely separate women's competition is held in the same years), while in odd-numbered years, the separately numbered 'individual championships' are held in conjunction with the women's competition of the same description, but without juniors, as a single event.

As a result, there is no separate individual all-around final in even-numbered years (except for juniors), and similarly no team all-around final in odd-numbered years. These thus remain biannual events. Otherwise the apparatus and titles are identical.

In 2015, UEG agreed that beginning in 2018, the annual European Championships in the midyear of the Olympic cycle (i.e. 2 years after, and before, a Summer Olympic Games) would be held as part of the new multi-sport European Championships event, and would be held in that format every four years. These combined events will continue to be run by UEG and the other sports federations. Although both the Men's and Women's championships will be held together, in the same venue, these championships will continue to be treated as separate men's and women's events, with junior events included.

A further event, the European Games also holds a full set of championships for European artistic gymnasts in the year preceding the Summer Olympic Games, having begun in 2015. These, however, are organized by the European Olympic Committees and are not recognized as part of the continuity of the European Championships. (Note: winners are therefore described as European Games gold medalists, or European Games champions, not European Champions.)

== Championships ==
Before 1996, European men's championships were held separately for both Seniors and Juniors. Beginning in 1996, Senior and Junior men's championships were combined. In 2005 a new and combined European Men's and Women's Artistic Gymnastics Individual Championships were inaugurated for senior gymnasts only. Although these championships are numbered separately, and the medals awarded counted separately, they constitute European Championships in the same manner as the men- and women-only competitions they alternate with, and the winners are considered European champions in the same way. For that reason, a list of those championships is also included in the section below.

The 2018 and 2022 editions of the Men's Championships formed part of the multi-sport European Championships of those years.

=== Senior and Junior Men's Championships (held separately) ===
Number (S)	Year	Host City	Host country	Events (S)
1	1955	Frankfurt	West Germany	7
2	1957	Paris	France	7
3	1959	Copenhagen	Denmark	7
4	1961	Luxembourg	Luxembourg	7
5	1963	Belgrade	Yugoslavia	7
6	1965	Antwerp	Belgium	7
7	1967	Tampere	Finland	7
8	1969	Warsaw	Poland	7
9	1971	Madrid	Spain	7
10	1973	Grenoble	France	7
11	1975	Bern	Switzerland	7
12	1977	Vilnius	Soviet Union	7
13	1979	Essen	West Germany	7
14	1981	Rome	Italy	7
15	1983	Varna	Bulgaria	7
16	1985	Oslo	Norway	7
17	1987	Moscow	Soviet Union	7
18	1989	Stockholm	Sweden	7
19	1990	Lausanne	Switzerland	7
20	1992	Budapest	Hungary	7
21	1994	Prague	Czech Republic	8
22	1996	Broendby	Denmark	8

Number (J)	Year	Host City	Host country	Events (J)
1	1978	Milan	Italy	
2	1980	Lyon	France	
3	1982	Ankara	Turkey	
4	1984	Rimini	Italy	
5	1986	Karlsruhe	West Germany	
6	1988	Avignon	France	
7	1990	Lausanne	Switzerland	
8	1991	Athens	Greece	
9	1992	Budapest	Hungary	
10	1993	Ghent	Belgium	
11	1994	Prague	Czech Republic	
12	1996	Copenhagen	Denmark	

=== Combined Senior and Junior Men's Championships ===
Year	Number (S/J)	Host City	Events (S+J)	Lead nation (S)	Lead nation (J)
1998	23/13	(Russia) Saint Petersburg	8+2	France	France
2000	24/14	(Germany) Bremen	8+8	Romania	Russia
2002	25/15	(Greece) Patras	8+8	Romania	Russia
2004	26/16	(Slovenia) Ljubljana	8+8	Romania	Russia
2006	27/17	(Greece) Volos	7+8	Russia	Germany
2008	28/18	(Switzerland) Lausanne	7+8	Russia	Great Britain
2010	29/19	(United Kingdom) Birmingham	7+8	Germany	Great Britain
2012	30/20	(France) Montpellier	7+8	Russia	Great Britain
2014	31/21	(Bulgaria) Sofia	7+8	Russia	Great Britain
2016	32/22	(Switzerland) Bern	7+8	Russia	Germany
2018	33/22	(United Kingdom) Glasgow	7+8	Russia	Italy
2020	34/23	(Turkey) Mersin	7+8	Turkey / Ukraine	Ukraine
2022	35/24	(Germany) Munich	8+8 *	Great Britain	Italy
2024	36/25	(Italy) Rimini	8+8	Ukraine	Great Britain
2026	37/26	(Croatia) Zagreb	8+8	Great Britain	Italy / Ukraine
2028	38/27	(Greece) Athens	8+8		

== Medal table ==
=== Seniors ===
As of 2026.

Rank	Nation	Gold	Silver	Bronze	Total
1	Soviet Union	90	59	35	184
2	Russia	39	21	29	89
3	Great Britain	21	20	18	59
4	Ukraine	21	19	19	59
5	Romania	19	22	14	55
6	Italy	17	11	22	50
7	Greece	17	6	8	31
8	Hungary	14	12	18	44
9	Bulgaria	12	9	12	33
10	Germany	11	10	17	38
11	Yugoslavia	11	5	9	25
12	Belarus	10	14	13	37
13	France	7	18	18	43
14	East Germany	7	17	17	41
15	Switzerland	7	8	14	29
16	Armenia	7	8	8	23
17	Turkey	7	7	7	21
18	Spain	7	4	4	15
19	Netherlands	6	4	2	12
20	West Germany	5	5	11	21
21	Croatia	4	7	1	12
22	Israel	4	6	7	17
23	Slovenia	4	5	5	14
24	Poland	3	7	8	18
25	Ireland	3	0	0	3
26	Sweden	2	4	4	10
27	Cyprus	2	2	3	7
28	Czechoslovakia	2	2	2	6
29	Lithuania	2	2	1	5
30	Finland	1	4	5	10
31	Latvia	1	1	1	3
32	Albania	1	0	0	1
33	World Gymnastics 2 (Note: In accordance with sanctions imposed following the 2022 Russian invasion of Ukraine, gymnasts from Russia were not permitted to use the name, flag, or anthem of the Russian Federation. They instead participated as "World Gymnastics 2" and under the World Gymnastics flag.)	0	5	2	7
34	Austria	0	1	1	2
35	Azerbaijan	0	1	0	1
35	Belgium	0	1	0	1
35	Luxembourg	0	1	0	1
35	Norway	0	1	0	1
39	Czech Republic	0	0	1	1
Totals (39 entries)		364	329	336	1,029

== See also ==
- European Artistic Gymnastics Championships – Men's individual all-around
- European Men's and Women's Artistic Gymnastics Individual Championships
- European Women's Artistic Gymnastics Championships
- World Artistic Gymnastics Championships

== Results ==
- "European Artistic Gymnastics Championships". GymnasticsResults.com. Archived from the original on 13 December 2009.
- "European Championships". Gymn-Forum.net.
