= Gymnastics at the 1956 Summer Olympics – Men's vault =

Olympic gymnastics event

Men's vault at the Games of the XVI Olympiad
- Artistic gymnastics pictogram
- Venue: Festival Hall
- Dates: 3–7 December 1956
- Competitors: 63 from 18 nations
- Winning score: 18.85

Medalists
1st place, gold medalist(s)		Helmut Bantz; United Team of Germany
1st place, gold medalist(s)		Valentin Muratov; Soviet Union
3rd place, bronze medalist(s)		Yuri Titov; Soviet Union

The men's vault competition was one of eight events for male competitors in artistic gymnastics at the 1956 Summer Olympics in Melbourne. It was held from 3 to 7 December at the Melbourne Festival Hall. There were 63 competitors from 18 nations (down sharply from the 185 gymnasts in 1952), with nations in the team competition having up to 6 gymnasts and other nations entering up to 3 gymnasts. The event was won by Helmut Bantz of the United Team of Germany and Valentin Muratov of the Soviet Union, who tied for the top place. Soviet Yuri Titov finished third to win the bronze medal.

== Background ==
This was the ninth appearance of the event, which is one of the five apparatus events held every time there were apparatus events at the Summer Olympics (no apparatus events were held in 1900, 1908, 1912, or 1920). Seven of the top 12 (including ties for 9th) gymnasts from 1952 returned: gold medalist Viktor Chukarin of the Soviet Union, silver medalist Masao Takemoto and bronze medalist Takashi Ono of Japan, and fifth-place finisher Theo Wied of Germany (now the United Team of Germany). The reigning (1954) world champion, Leo Sotorník of Czechoslovakia, did not compete in Melbourne, but the runner-up (Helmut Bantz of the United Team of Germany) did.

Australia and Canada each made their debut in the men's vault; East and West Germany competed together as the United Team of Germany for the first time. The United States made its eighth appearance, most of any nation, having missed only the inaugural 1896 Games.

== Competition format ==
The gymnastics format continued to use the aggregation format, mostly following the scoring tweaks made in 1952. Each nation entered either a team of six gymnasts or up to three individual gymnasts. The event used a "vaulting horse" aligned parallel to the gymnast's run (rather than the modern "vaulting table" in use since 2004). All entrants in the gymnastics competitions performed both a compulsory exercise and a voluntary exercise for each apparatus. The 2 exercise scores were summed to give an apparatus total. No separate finals were contested.

Exercise scores ranged from 0 to 10 and apparatus scores from 0 to 20.

== Schedule ==
All times are Australian Eastern Standard Time (UTC+10)

Date	Time	Round
Monday, 3 December 1956; Tuesday, 4 December 1956; Wednesday, 5 December 1956; Thursday, 6 December 1956; Friday, 7 December 1956	8:00	Final

== Results ==
Rank	Gymnast	Nation	Compulsory	Voluntary	Total
1st place, gold medalist(s)	Valentin Muratov	Soviet Union	9.40	9.45	18.85
1st place, gold medalist(s)	Helmut Bantz	United Team of Germany	9.40	9.45	18.85
3rd place, bronze medalist(s)	Yury Titov	Soviet Union	9.35	9.40	18.75
4	Boris Shakhlin	Soviet Union	9.35	9.35	18.70
4	Theo Wied	United Team of Germany	9.30	9.40	18.70
6	Masao Takemoto	Japan	9.20	9.45	18.65
7	Viktor Chukarin	Soviet Union	9.25	9.35	18.60
7	Jack Beckner	United States	9.25	9.35	18.60
7	Robert Klein	United Team of Germany	9.30	9.30	18.60
7	Jakob Kiefer	United Team of Germany	9.30	9.30	18.60
11	Albert Azaryan	Soviet Union	9.15	9.40	18.55
11	Kalevi Suoniemi	Finland	9.15	9.40	18.55
11	Martti Mansikka	Finland	9.20	9.35	18.55
11	Vladimír Kejř	Czechoslovakia	9.10	9.45	18.55
11	Attila Takács	Hungary	9.20	9.35	18.55
16	Takashi Ono	Japan	9.20	9.30	18.50
16	William Thoresson	Sweden	9.20	9.30	18.50
16	Erich Wied	United Team of Germany	9.20	9.30	18.50
19	Shinsaku Tsukawaki	Japan	9.20	9.25	18.45
19	Josef Škvor	Czechoslovakia	9.20	9.25	18.45
19	Charles Simms	United States	9.15	9.30	18.45
19	Kurt Wigartz	Sweden	9.25	9.20	18.45
23	Ferdinand Daniš	Czechoslovakia	9.30	9.10	18.40
23	Olavi Leimuvirta	Finland	9.10	9.30	18.40
23	Jaroslav Mikoška	Czechoslovakia	9.20	9.20	18.40
23	Josy Stoffel	Luxembourg	9.00	9.40	18.40
23	Armando Vega	United States	9.10	9.30	18.40
28	Pavel Stolbov	Soviet Union	9.10	9.25	18.35
28	Bill Tom	United States	9.10	9.25	18.35
28	Stoyan Stoyanov	Bulgaria	9.15	9.20	18.35
28	Mincho Todorov	Bulgaria	9.05	9.30	18.35
28	Bruce Sharp	Australia	9.25	9.10	18.35
33	Masami Kubota	Japan	9.25	9.05	18.30
33	Akira Kono	Japan	9.00	9.30	18.30
33	Hans Pfann	United Team of Germany	9.05	9.25	18.30
36	Velik Kapsazov	Bulgaria	9.10	9.15	18.25
36	Onni Lappalainen	Finland	9.00	9.25	18.25
36	Raymond Dot	France	9.00	9.25	18.25
39	Zdeněk Růžička	Czechoslovakia	9.10	9.10	18.20
39	János Héder	Hungary	9.00	9.20	18.20
41	Nobuyuki Aihara	Japan	9.20	8.90	18.10
41	Raimo Heinonen	Finland	9.05	9.05	18.10
43	Dick Beckner	United States	8.85	9.20	18.05
43	Ed Gagnier	Canada	9.00	9.05	18.05
43	David Gourlay	Australia	9.00	9.05	18.05
46	Jaroslav Bím	Czechoslovakia	9.00	9.00	18.00
47	Abie Grossfeld	United States	8.85	9.10	17.95
47	Brian Blackburn	Australia	9.00	8.95	17.95
47	Hans Sauter	Austria	9.00	8.95	17.95
50	Berndt Lindfors	Finland	8.80	9.10	17.90
50	Michel Mathiot	France	8.80	9.10	17.90
50	Jean Guillou	France	8.90	9.00	17.90
50	Ronnie Lombard	South Africa	9.00	8.90	17.90
50	Noel Punton	Australia	9.05	8.85	17.90
55	Rafael Lecuona	Cuba	8.95	8.90	17.85
56	Graham Bond	Australia	9.00	8.80	17.80
57	Frank Turner	Great Britain	8.90	8.70	17.60
58	Nik Stuart	Great Britain	8.65	8.90	17.55
59	Jack Wells	South Africa	8.60	8.85	17.45
60	Sham Lal	India	8.35	8.15	16.50
61	John Lees	Australia	7.50	8.90	16.40
62	Pritam Singh	India	8.15	8.05	16.20
63	Anant Ram	India	8.45	7.20	15.65
