= Gymnastics at the 1956 Summer Olympics – Men's pommel horse =

Olympic gymnastics event

Men's pommel horse at the Games of the XVI Olympiad
- Artistic gymnastics pictogram
- Venue: Festival Hall
- Date: 3–7 December 1956
- Competitors: 63 from 18 nations
- Winning score: 19.25

Medalists
1st place, gold medalist(s)		Boris Shakhlin; Soviet Union
2nd place, silver medalist(s)		Takashi Ono; Japan
3rd place, bronze medalist(s)		Viktor Chukarin; Soviet Union

The men's pommel horse competition was one of eight events for male competitors in artistic gymnastics at the 1956 Summer Olympics in Melbourne. It was held from 3 to 7 December at the Melbourne Festival Hall. There were 63 competitors from 18 nations (down sharply from the 185 gymnasts in 1952), with nations in the team competition having up to 6 gymnasts and other nations entering up to 3 gymnasts. The event was won by Boris Shakhlin of the Soviet Union, the nation's second consecutive victory in the pommel horse. Takashi Ono earned Japan's first medal in the event with his silver. Soviet Viktor Chukarin became the first man to win multiple medals in the pommel horse, adding a bronze to his 1952 gold.

== Background ==
This was the ninth appearance of the event, which is one of the five apparatus events held every time there were apparatus events at the Summer Olympics (no apparatus events were held in 1900, 1908, 1912, or 1920). Two of the top 10 gymnasts from 1952 returned: gold medalist Viktor Chukarin of the Soviet Union and sixth-place finisher Hans Sauter of Austria. Reigning world champion and Olympic silver medalist Hrant Shahinyan of the Soviet Union did not compete; Chukarin at third place in the worlds was the highest placed gymnast to come to Melbourne.

Australia and Canada each made their debut in the men's pommel horse; East and West Germany competed together as the United Team of Germany for the first time. The United States made its eighth appearance, most of any nation, having missed only the inaugural 1896 Games.

== Competition format ==
The gymnastics format continued to use the aggregation format, mostly following the scoring tweaks made in 1952. Each nation entered either a team of six gymnasts or up to three individual gymnasts. All entrants in the gymnastics competitions performed both a compulsory exercise and a voluntary exercise for each apparatus. The 2 exercise scores were summed to give an apparatus total. No separate finals were contested.

Exercise scores ranged from 0 to 10 and apparatus scores from 0 to 20.

== Schedule ==
All times are Australian Eastern Standard Time (UTC+10)

Date	Time	Round
Monday, 3 December 1956; Tuesday, 4 December 1956; Wednesday, 5 December 1956; Thursday, 6 December 1956; Friday, 7 December 1956	8:00	Final

== Results ==
Rank	Gymnast	Nation	Compulsory	Voluntary	Total
1st place, gold medalist(s)	Boris Shakhlin	Soviet Union	9.50	9.75	19.25
2nd place, silver medalist(s)	Takashi Ono	Japan	9.50	9.70	19.20
3rd place, bronze medalist(s)	Viktor Chukarin	Soviet Union	9.50	9.60	19.10
4	Josef Škvor	Czechoslovakia	9.45	9.60	19.05
5	Yuri Titov	Soviet Union	9.45	9.55	19.00
6	Jaroslav Bím	Czechoslovakia	9.35	9.60	18.95
7	Masao Takemoto	Japan	9.45	9.45	18.90
7	Pavel Stolbov	Soviet Union	9.40	9.50	18.90
9	Valentin Muratov	Soviet Union	9.45	9.35	18.80
9	Kalevi Suoniemi	Finland	9.35	9.45	18.80
9	Berndt Lindfors	Finland	9.45	9.35	18.80
12	Nobuyuki Aihara	Japan	9.35	9.40	18.75
12	Helmut Bantz	United Team of Germany	9.35	9.40	18.75
12	Josy Stoffel	Luxembourg	9.30	9.45	18.75
12	Albert Azaryan	Soviet Union	9.25	9.50	18.75
16	Martti Mansikka	Finland	9.30	9.35	18.65
16	Masami Kubota	Japan	9.35	9.30	18.65
16	Olavi Leimuvirta	Finland	9.35	9.30	18.65
16	Velik Kapsazov	Bulgaria	9.30	9.35	18.65
20	Akira Kono	Japan	9.00	9.60	18.60
21	Nik Stuart	Great Britain	9.30	9.25	18.55
22	Shinsaku Tsukawaki	Japan	9.20	9.25	18.45
22	Onni Lappalainen	Finland	9.05	9.40	18.45
22	Attila Takács	Hungary	9.10	9.35	18.45
25	Jack Beckner	United States	9.30	9.10	18.40
26	Ferdinand Daniš	Czechoslovakia	9.40	8.85	18.25
26	Vladimír Kejř	Czechoslovakia	9.15	9.10	18.25
28	Hans Pfann	United Team of Germany	9.25	8.95	18.20
28	Michel Mathiot	France	9.20	9.00	18.20
30	Raimo Heinonen	Finland	8.90	9.25	18.15
30	Charles Simms	United States	9.35	8.80	18.15
32	Jaroslav Mikoška	Czechoslovakia	9.35	8.75	18.10
33	Jakob Kiefer	United Team of Germany	9.20	8.85	18.05
33	Rafael Lecuona	Cuba	8.90	9.15	18.05
33	Ronnie Lombard	South Africa	9.05	9.00	18.05
36	Robert Klein	United Team of Germany	8.95	9.05	18.00
37	Theo Wied	United Team of Germany	8.90	9.05	17.95
38	Kurt Wigartz	Sweden	8.85	9.00	18.85
38	Zdeněk Růžička	Czechoslovakia	9.15	8.70	17.85
38	Stoyan Stoyanov	Bulgaria	9.10	8.75	17.85
38	Jean Guillou	France	9.40	8.45	17.85
38	János Héder	Hungary	8.80	9.05	17.85
43	Raymond Dot	France	8.70	9.10	17.80
44	Bill Tom	United States	8.60	9.15	17.75
45	William Thoresson	Sweden	8.90	8.80	17.70
45	Ed Gagnier	Canada	8.50	9.20	17.70
47	Dick Beckner	United States	8.70	8.80	17.50
48	Jack Wells	South Africa	8.70	8.75	17.45
49	Mincho Todorov	Bulgaria	8.50	8.90	17.40
50	Armando Vega	United States	8.60	8.75	17.35
51	Abie Grossfeld	United States	8.65	8.65	17.30
51	Erich Wied	United Team of Germany	8.60	8.70	17.30
53	Frank Turner	Great Britain	8.55	7.80	16.35
54	John Lees	Australia	7.70	7.85	15.55
55	David Gourlay	Australia	7.50	7.20	14.70
56	Graham Bond	Australia	6.95	7.00	13.95
57	Noel Punton	Australia	5.50	7.10	12.60
58	Brian Blackburn	Australia	5.00	7.10	12.10
59	Bruce Sharp	Australia	5.65	4.95	10.60
60	Pritam Singh	India	4.50	5.75	10.25
61	Sham Lal	India	3.40	6.60	10.00
62	Hans Sauter	Austria	9.10	—	9.10
63	Anant Ram	India	2.00	6.25	8.25
