= Gymnastics at the 1956 Summer Olympics – Men's artistic individual all-around =

Olympic gymnastics event

Men's artistic individual all-around at the Games of the XVI Olympiad
- Venue: Festival Hall
- Dates: 3–7 December 1956
- Competitors: 63 from 18 nations
- Winning score: 114.25

Medalists
1st place, gold medalist(s)		Viktor Chukarin	Soviet Union
2nd place, silver medalist(s)		Takashi Ono	Japan
3rd place, bronze medalist(s)		Yury Titov	Soviet Union

The men's artistic individual all-around competition at the 1956 Summer Olympics was held at the West Melbourne Stadium from 3 to 7 December. It was the twelfth appearance of the event. There were 63 competitors from 18 nations, with each nation entering up to 6 gymnasts. The event was won by Viktor Chukarin of the Soviet Union, the second man to successfully defend an all-around title (after Alberto Braglia in 1908 and 1912) and fourth to earn multiple medals of any color. His countryman Yury Titov took bronze. Takashi Ono of Japan earned silver. It was the first medal in the event for Japan, beginning that nation's nearly four-decade battle with the Soviet Union for dominance. Every men's all-around medal from 1956 to 1976 was won by a gymnast from one of those two nations; from 1952 to 1988, the Soviets won six of the ten gold medals while Japan won the other four.

== Background ==
This was the 12th appearance of the men's individual all-around. The first individual all-around competition had been held in 1900, after the 1896 competitions featured only individual apparatus events. A men's individual all-around has been held every Games since 1900.

Three of the top 10 gymnasts from the 1952 Games returned: gold medalist Viktor Chukarin of the Soviet Union, fourth-place finisher Valentin Muratov of the Soviet Union, and ninth-place finisher Helmut Bantz of Germany. Chukarin and Muratov had tied for the World Championship in 1954.

Australia made its debut in the event. East and West Germany competed together as the United Team of Germany for the first time. France made its 10th appearance, tying the absent Italy for most among nations.

== Competition format ==
The gymnastics format continued to use the aggregation format, mostly following the scoring tweaks made in 1952. Each nation entered either a team of six gymnasts or up to three individual gymnasts. All entrants in the gymnastics competitions performed both a compulsory exercise and a voluntary exercise for each apparatus. The 12 exercise scores were summed to give an individual all-around total.

No separate finals were contested.

Exercise scores ranged from 0 to 10, apparatus scores from 0 to 20, and individual totals from 0 to 120.

== Schedule ==
All times are Australian Eastern Standard Time (UTC+10)

Date	Time	Round
Monday, 3 December 1956; Tuesday, 4 December 1956; Wednesday, 5 December 1956; Thursday, 6 December 1956; Friday, 7 December 1956	8:00	Final

== Results ==
The results of the competition are shown below.

Rank	Gymnast	Nation	Exercise results																		Total
Rank	Gymnast	Nation	Floor (gymnastics)			Rings (gymnastics)			Pommel horse			Vault (gymnastics)			Parallel bars			Horizontal bar			Total
Rank	Gymnast	Nation	C	V	T	C	V	T	C	V	T	C	V	T	C	V	T	C	V	T	Total
1st place, gold medalist(s)	Viktor Chukarin	Soviet Union	9.55	9.55	19.10	9.40	9.60	19.00	9.50	9.60	19.10	9.25	9.35	18.60	9.55	9.65	19.20	9.55	9.70	19.25	114.25
2nd place, silver medalist(s)	Takashi Ono	Japan	9.40	9.35	18.75	9.50	9.55	19.05	9.50	9.70	19.20	9.20	9.30	18.50	9.60	9.50	19.10	9.75	9.85	19.60	114.20
3rd place, bronze medalist(s)	Yury Titov	Soviet Union	9.50	9.45	18.95	9.40	9.45	18.85	9.45	9.55	19.00	9.35	9.40	18.75	9.40	9.45	18.85	9.70	9.70	19.40	113.80
4	Masao Takemoto	Japan	9.00	9.50	18.50	9.60	9.50	19.10	9.45	9.45	18.90	9.20	9.45	18.65	9.40	9.70	19.10	9.70	9.60	19.30	113.55
5	Valentin Muratov	Soviet Union	9.60	9.60	19.20	9.60	9.55	19.15	9.45	9.35	18.80	9.40	9.45	18.85	9.30	9.40	18.70	9.55	9.05	18.60	113.30
6	Helmut Bantz	United Team of Germany	9.35	9.40	18.75	9.25	9.35	18.60	9.35	9.40	18.75	9.40	9.45	18.85	9.45	9.35	18.80	9.50	9.65	19.15	112.90
7	Albert Azaryan	Soviet Union	8.90	9.05	17.95	9.55	9.80	19.35	9.25	9.50	18.75	9.15	9.40	18.55	9.30	9.70	19.00	9.40	9.55	18.95	112.55
8	Masami Kubota	Japan	9.30	9.40	18.70	9.60	9.50	19.10	9.35	9.30	18.65	9.25	9.05	18.30	9.55	9.60	19.15	9.20	9.40	18.60	112.50
8	Boris Shakhlin	Soviet Union	8.95	9.30	18.25	9.35	9.35	18.70	9.50	9.75	19.25	9.35	9.35	18.70	9.30	9.55	18.85	9.30	9.45	18.75	112.50
10	Nobuyuki Aihara	Japan	9.50	9.60	19.10	9.55	9.50	19.05	9.35	9.40	18.75	9.20	8.90	18.10	9.35	9.55	18.90	9.30	9.25	18.55	112.45
11	Kalevi Suoniemi	Finland	9.35	9.35	18.70	9.30	9.50	18.80	9.35	9.45	18.80	9.15	9.40	18.55	9.25	9.55	18.80	9.25	9.45	18.70	112.35
12	Shinsaku Tsukawaki	Japan	9.30	9.40	18.70	9.50	9.50	19.00	9.20	9.25	18.45	9.20	9.25	18.45	9.45	9.40	18.85	9.30	9.45	18.75	112.20
13	Ferdinand Daniš	Czechoslovakia	9.40	9.40	18.80	9.45	9.45	18.90	9.40	8.85	18.25	9.30	9.10	18.40	9.40	9.30	18.70	9.45	9.40	18.85	111.90
14	Pavel Stolbov	Soviet Union	9.15	9.35	18.50	9.40	9.40	18.80	9.40	9.50	18.90	9.10	9.25	18.35	8.55	9.40	17.95	9.55	9.70	19.25	111.75
15	Berndt Lindfors	Finland	9.05	9.45	18.50	9.45	9.40	18.85	9.45	9.35	18.80	8.80	9.10	17.90	9.45	9.45	18.90	9.20	9.45	18.65	111.60
16	Akira Kono	Japan	9.40	9.10	18.50	9.40	9.30	18.70	9.00	9.60	18.60	9.00	9.30	18.30	9.40	9.30	18.70	9.30	9.45	18.75	111.55
17	Jack Beckner	United States	9.25	9.25	18.50	8.70	9.05	17.75	9.30	9.10	18.40	9.25	9.35	18.60	9.40	9.35	18.75	9.40	9.60	19.00	111.00
18	Josef Škvor	Czechoslovakia	8.90	9.10	18.00	9.15	9.05	18.20	9.45	9.60	19.05	9.20	9.25	18.45	9.20	9.25	18.45	9.20	9.50	18.70	110.85
19	Velik Kapsazov	Bulgaria	9.00	9.15	18.15	9.20	9.25	18.45	9.30	9.35	18.65	9.10	9.15	18.25	9.20	9.30	18.50	9.40	9.35	18.75	110.75
20	Robert Klein	United Team of Germany	9.30	9.20	18.50	9.40	9.35	18.75	8.95	9.05	18.00	9.30	9.30	18.60	9.20	9.10	18.30	9.25	9.20	18.45	110.60
20	Martti Mansikka	Finland	9.30	9.40	18.70	9.15	9.05	18.20	9.30	9.35	18.65	9.20	9.35	18.55	9.15	9.35	18.50	8.90	9.10	18.00	110.60
22	Onni Lappalainen	Finland	9.20	9.30	18.50	8.95	9.20	18.15	9.05	9.40	18.45	9.00	9.25	18.25	9.30	9.55	18.85	9.00	9.25	18.25	110.45
23	Vladimír Kejř	Czechoslovakia	9.10	9.30	18.40	9.30	9.20	18.50	9.15	9.10	18.25	9.10	9.45	18.55	9.15	9.15	18.30	9.20	9.10	18.30	110.30
24	Attila Takács	Hungary	9.15	9.25	18.40	8.95	9.25	18.20	9.10	9.35	18.45	9.20	9.35	18.55	9.40	9.25	18.65	9.45	8.45	17.90	110.15
25	Theo Wied	United Team of Germany	9.20	9.20	18.40	9.05	8.75	17.80	8.90	9.05	17.95	9.30	9.40	18.70	9.15	9.20	18.35	9.25	9.45	18.70	109.90
26	Zdeněk Růžička	Czechoslovakia	9.00	9.20	18.20	9.10	9.20	18.30	9.15	8.70	17.85	9.10	9.10	18.20	9.00	9.30	18.30	9.45	9.35	18.80	109.65
27	Olavi Leimuvirta	Finland	8.95	9.20	18.15	8.75	8.40	17.15	9.35	9.30	18.65	9.10	9.30	18.40	9.20	9.65	18.85	8.95	9.20	18.15	109.35
27	Jaroslav Mikoška	Czechoslovakia	9.10	9.10	18.20	8.75	8.90	17.65	9.35	8.75	18.10	9.20	9.20	18.40	9.35	9.35	18.70	9.35	8.95	18.30	109.35
29	Hans Pfann	United Team of Germany	8.85	9.30	18.15	9.10	9.10	18.20	9.25	8.95	18.20	9.05	9.25	18.30	9.30	9.25	18.55	8.55	9.20	17.75	109.15
30	Josy Stoffel	Luxembourg	9.20	9.00	18.20	8.50	8.90	17.40	9.30	9.45	18.75	9.00	9.40	18.40	9.30	8.50	17.80	9.25	9.20	18.45	109.00
31	Armando Vega	United States	9.20	9.40	18.60	9.05	9.40	18.45	8.60	8.75	17.35	9.10	9.30	18.40	8.10	9.50	17.60	9.15	8.90	18.05	108.45
32	Raymond Dot	France	8.60	9.10	17.70	8.85	8.60	17.45	8.70	9.10	17.80	9.00	9.25	18.25	9.25	9.15	18.40	9.40	9.40	18.80	108.40
32	William Thoresson	Sweden	9.50	9.60	19.10	8.20	8.40	16.60	8.90	8.80	17.70	9.20	9.30	18.50	9.40	9.30	18.70	9.05	8.75	17.80	108.40
32	Charles Simms	United States	8.55	8.70	17.25	8.70	8.80	17.50	9.35	8.80	18.15	9.15	9.30	18.45	9.10	9.30	18.40	9.20	9.45	18.65	108.40
35	Dick Beckner	United States	8.85	9.05	17.90	9.35	9.30	18.65	8.70	8.80	17.50	8.85	9.20	18.05	8.55	9.20	17.75	9.10	9.35	18.45	108.30
36	Jaroslav Bím	Czechoslovakia	7.90	8.70	16.60	8.90	9.20	18.10	9.35	9.60	18.95	9.00	9.00	18.00	9.15	9.10	18.25	9.05	9.30	18.35	108.25
37	Raimo Heinonen	Finland	8.60	9.15	17.75	7.85	8.90	16.75	8.90	9.25	18.15	9.05	9.05	18.10	9.20	9.45	18.65	9.25	9.45	18.70	108.10
38	Nik Stuart	Great Britain	9.20	9.20	18.40	9.15	7.70	16.85	9.30	9.25	18.55	8.65	8.90	17.55	9.15	9.15	18.30	9.15	9.05	18.20	107.85
39	Abie Grossfeld	United States	9.10	9.30	18.40	9.20	8.30	17.50	8.65	8.65	17.30	8.85	9.10	17.95	8.75	9.10	17.85	9.35	9.40	18.75	107.75
40	Michel Mathiot	France	9.00	9.15	18.15	8.60	8.40	17.00	9.20	9.00	18.20	8.80	9.10	17.90	9.10	9.30	18.40	9.15	8.75	17.90	107.55
41	Erich Wied	United Team of Germany	8.60	9.20	17.80	8.70	8.95	17.65	8.60	8.70	17.30	9.20	9.30	18.50	9.00	9.10	18.10	8.65	9.50	18.15	107.50
42	Jakob Kiefer	United Team of Germany	8.85	9.15	18.00	8.35	8.15	16.50	9.20	8.85	18.05	9.30	9.30	18.60	9.20	8.45	17.65	9.25	9.40	18.65	107.45
43	Bill Tom	United States	9.00	9.20	18.20	8.10	8.75	16.85	8.60	9.15	17.75	9.10	9.25	18.35	9.05	9.30	18.35	8.80	9.05	17.85	107.35
44	János Héder	Hungary	8.40	9.00	17.40	8.90	9.20	18.10	8.80	9.05	17.85	9.00	9.20	18.20	9.20	9.10	18.30	9.20	8.25	17.45	107.30
45	Stoyan Stoyanov	Bulgaria	8.80	9.10	17.90	7.05	8.60	15.65	9.10	8.75	17.85	9.15	9.20	18.35	9.35	9.15	18.50	9.35	9.45	18.80	107.05
46	Jean Guillou	France	8.95	8.90	17.85	8.60	8.00	16.60	9.40	8.45	17.85	8.90	9.00	17.90	9.35	8.60	17.95	9.30	9.20	18.50	106.65
47	Mincho Todorov	Bulgaria	9.35	9.45	18.80	7.65	7.90	15.55	8.50	8.90	17.40	9.05	9.30	18.35	9.10	8.90	18.00	9.00	9.10	18.10	106.20
48	Kurt Wigartz	Sweden	9.25	9.40	18.65	6.90	8.40	15.30	8.85	9.00	18.85	9.25	9.20	18.45	8.80	9.05	17.85	9.20	8.85	18.05	106.15
49	Ed Gagnier	Canada	8.85	9.20	18.05	8.40	8.45	16.85	8.50	9.20	17.70	9.00	9.05	18.05	8.85	8.80	17.65	7.65	8.45	16.10	104.40
50	Frank Turner	Great Britain	8.05	8.50	16.55	8.75	8.50	17.25	8.55	7.80	16.35	8.90	8.70	17.60	8.75	8.90	17.65	8.95	8.80	17.75	103.15
51	Ronnie Lombard	South Africa	8.00	8.25	16.25	7.60	8.30	15.90	9.05	9.00	18.05	9.00	8.90	17.90	7.65	7.15	14.80	9.05	8.90	17.95	100.85
52	Rafael Lecuona	Cuba	8.30	8.05	16.35	7.70	8.30	16.00	8.90	9.15	18.05	8.95	8.90	17.85	8.50	8.95	17.45	6.75	7.80	14.55	100.25
53	Jack Wells	South Africa	8.45	8.05	16.50	7.35	8.50	15.85	8.70	8.75	17.45	8.60	8.85	17.45	7.40	7.95	15.35	8.50	8.70	17.20	99.80
54	Graham Bond	Australia	7.65	8.00	15.65	7.00	7.85	14.85	6.95	7.00	13.95	9.00	8.80	17.80	8.15	8.35	16.50	8.90	8.75	17.65	96.40
55	David Gourlay	Australia	8.25	8.00	16.25	7.55	7.90	15.45	7.50	7.20	14.70	9.00	9.05	18.05	7.80	7.65	15.45	8.10	7.90	16.00	95.90
56	John Lees	Australia	7.25	7.50	14.75	7.95	8.45	16.40	7.70	7.85	15.55	7.50	8.90	16.40	8.00	8.15	16.15	7.70	6.10	13.80	93.05
57	Bruce Sharp	Australia	8.80	8.80	17.60	8.10	7.85	15.95	5.65	4.95	10.60	9.25	9.10	18.35	8.20	8.30	16.50	7.30	6.65	13.95	92.95
58	Brian Blackburn	Australia	8.85	9.05	17.90	7.50	7.05	14.55	5.00	7.10	12.10	9.00	8.95	17.95	8.45	7.25	15.70	8.20	5.00	13.20	91.40
59	Noel Punton	Australia	8.55	8.50	17.05	6.80	7.55	14.35	5.50	7.10	12.60	9.05	8.85	17.90	7.70	7.65	15.35	4.50	4.00	8.50	85.75
60	Hans Sauter	Austria	8.50	–	8.50	8.55	8.70	17.25	9.10	–	9.10	9.00	8.95	17.95	9.05	8.80	17.85	9.20	–	9.20	79.85
61	Pritam Singh	India	7.80	7.30	15.10	6.00	4.75	10.75	4.50	5.75	10.25	8.15	8.05	16.20	7.50	6.00	13.50	5.80	5.75	11.55	77.35
62	Sham Lal	India	6.45	6.80	13.25	6.90	6.60	13.50	3.40	6.60	10.00	8.35	8.15	16.50	6.25	7.10	13.35	4.00	6.50	10.50	77.10
63	Anant Ram	India	5.00	7.50	12.50	4.75	2.00	6.75	2.00	6.25	8.25	8.45	7.20	15.65	7.20	5.50	12.70	8.20	1.50	9.70	65.55
