= Gymnastics at the 1956 Summer Olympics – Men's horizontal bar =

Olympic gymnastics event

Men's horizontal bar at the Games of the XVI Olympiad
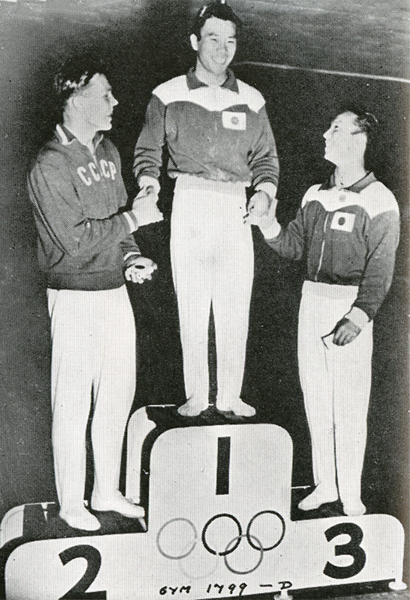
- Medal presentation: Titov, Ono, and Takemoto
- Venue: Festival Hall
- Dates: 3–7 December 1956
- Competitors: 63 from 18 nations
- Winning score: 19.60

Medalists
1st place, gold medalist(s)		Takashi Ono; Japan
2nd place, silver medalist(s)		Yuri Titov; Soviet Union
3rd place, bronze medalist(s)		Masao Takemoto; Japan

The men's horizontal bar competition was one of eight events for male competitors in artistic gymnastics at the 1956 Summer Olympics in Melbourne. There were 63 competitors from 18 nations (down sharply from the 185 gymnasts in 1952), with nations in the team competition having up to 6 gymnasts and other nations entering up to 3 gymnasts. The event was won by Takashi Ono of Japan, with his countryman Masao Takemoto taking bronze. Silver went to Yuri Titov of the Soviet Union. Japan and the Soviet Union each earned their first horizontal bar medals.

== Background ==
This was the ninth appearance of the event, which is one of the five apparatus events held every time there were apparatus events at the Summer Olympics (no apparatus events were held in 1900, 1908, 1912, or 1920). Four of the top 10 gymnasts from 1952 returned: fifth-place finisher Viktor Chukarin of the Soviet Union, seventh-place finisher Helmut Bantz of Germany, and ninth-place finishers Berndt Lindfors of Finland and Valentin Muratov of the Soviet Union. Muratov had won the 1954 world championship, with Bantz and Boris Shakhlin of the Soviet Union tying for second.

Australia and Canada each made their debut in the men's horizontal bar; East and West Germany competed together as the United Team of Germany for the first time. The United States made its eighth appearance, most of any nation, having missed only the inaugural 1896 Games.

== Competition format ==
The gymnastics format continued to use the aggregation format, mostly following the scoring tweaks made in 1952. Each nation entered either a team of six gymnasts or up to three individual gymnasts. All entrants in the gymnastics competitions performed both a compulsory exercise and a voluntary exercise for each apparatus. The 2 exercise scores were summed to give an apparatus total. No separate finals were contested.

Exercise scores ranged from 0 to 10 and apparatus scores from 0 to 20.

== Schedule ==
All times are Australian Eastern Standard Time (UTC+10)

Date	Time	Round
Monday, 3 December 1956; Tuesday, 4 December 1956; Wednesday, 5 December 1956; Thursday, 6 December 1956; Friday, 7 December 1956	8:00	Final

== Results ==
Rank	Gymnast	Nation	Compulsory	Voluntary	Total
1st place, gold medalist(s)	Takashi Ono	Japan	9.75	9.85	19.60
2nd place, silver medalist(s)	Yury Titov	Soviet Union	9.70	9.70	19.40
3rd place, bronze medalist(s)	Masao Takemoto	Japan	9.70	9.60	19.30
4	Viktor Chukarin	Soviet Union	9.55	9.70	19.25
4	Pavel Stolbov	Soviet Union	9.55	9.70	19.25
6	Helmut Bantz	United Team of Germany	9.50	9.65	19.15
7	Jack Beckner	United States	9.40	9.60	19.00
8	Albert Azaryan	Soviet Union	9.40	9.55	18.95
9	Ferdinand Daniš	Czechoslovakia	9.45	9.40	18.85
10	Stoyan Stoyanov	Bulgaria	9.35	9.45	18.80
10	Raymond Dot	France	9.40	9.40	18.80
10	Zdeněk Růžička	Czechoslovakia	9.45	9.35	18.80
13	Shinsaku Tsukawaki	Japan	9.30	9.45	18.75
13	Boris Shakhlin	Soviet Union	9.30	9.45	18.75
13	Akira Kono	Japan	9.30	9.45	18.75
13	Velik Kapsazov	Bulgaria	9.40	9.35	18.75
13	Abie Grossfeld	United States	9.35	9.40	18.75
18	Kalevi Suoniemi	Finland	9.25	9.45	18.70
18	Raimo Heinonen	Finland	9.25	9.45	18.70
18	Josef Škvor	Czechoslovakia	9.20	9.50	18.70
18	Theo Wied	United Team of Germany	9.25	9.45	18.70
22	Berndt Lindfors	Finland	9.20	9.45	18.65
22	Charles Simms	United States	9.20	9.45	18.65
22	Jakob Kiefer	United Team of Germany	9.25	9.40	18.65
25	Masami Kubota	Japan	9.20	9.40	18.60
25	Valentin Muratov	Soviet Union	9.55	9.05	18.60
27	Nobuyuki Aihara	Japan	9.30	9.25	18.55
28	Jean Guillou	France	9.30	9.20	18.50
29	Robert Klein	United Team of Germany	9.25	9.20	18.45
29	Josy Stoffel	Luxembourg	9.25	9.20	18.45
29	Dick Beckner	United States	9.10	9.35	18.45
32	Jaroslav Bím	Czechoslovakia	9.05	9.30	18.35
33	Jaroslav Mikoška	Czechoslovakia	9.35	8.95	18.30
33	Vladimír Kejř	Czechoslovakia	9.20	9.10	18.30
35	Onni Lappalainen	Finland	9.00	9.25	18.25
36	Nik Stuart	Great Britain	9.15	9.05	18.20
37	Olavi Leimuvirta	Finland	8.95	9.20	18.15
37	Erich Wied	United Team of Germany	8.65	9.50	18.15
39	Mincho Todorov	Bulgaria	9.00	9.10	18.10
40	Kurt Wigartz	Sweden	9.20	8.85	18.05
40	Armando Vega	United States	9.15	8.90	18.05
42	Martti Mansikka	Finland	8.90	9.10	18.00
43	Ronnie Lombard	South Africa	9.05	8.90	17.95
44	Attila Takács	Hungary	9.45	8.45	17.90
44	Michel Mathiot	France	9.15	8.75	17.90
46	Bill Tom	United States	8.80	9.05	17.85
47	William Thoresson	Sweden	9.05	8.75	17.80
48	Hans Pfann	United Team of Germany	8.55	9.20	17.75
48	Frank Turner	Great Britain	8.95	8.80	17.75
50	Graham Bond	Australia	8.90	8.75	17.65
51	János Héder	Hungary	9.20	8.25	17.45
52	Jack Wells	South Africa	8.50	8.70	17.20
53	Ed Gagnier	Canada	7.65	8.45	16.10
54	David Gourlay	Australia	8.10	7.90	16.00
55	Rafael Lecuona	Cuba	6.75	7.80	14.55
56	Bruce Sharp	Australia	7.30	6.65	13.95
57	John Lees	Australia	7.70	6.10	13.80
58	Brian Blackburn	Australia	8.20	5.00	13.20
59	Pritam Singh	India	5.80	5.75	11.55
60	Sham Lal	India	4.00	6.50	10.50
61	Anant Ram	India	8.20	1.50	9.70
62	Hans Sauter	Austria	9.20	—	9.20
63	Noel Punton	Australia	4.50	4.00	8.50
