= Gymnastics at the 1956 Summer Olympics – Men's floor =

Men's floor exercise at the Games of the XVI Olympiad

Medalists
1st place, gold medalist(s)		Valentin Muratov	Soviet Union
2nd place, silver medalist(s)		Nobuyuki Aihara	Japan
2nd place, silver medalist(s)		William Thoresson	Sweden
2nd place, silver medalist(s)		Viktor Chukarin	Soviet Union

These are the results of the men's floor competition, one of eight events for male competitors in artistic gymnastics at the 1956 Summer Olympics in Melbourne.

== Competition format ==
The gymnastics format continued to use the aggregation format, mostly following the scoring tweaks made in 1952. Each nation entered either a team of six gymnasts or up to three individual gymnasts. All entrants in the gymnastics competitions performed both a compulsory exercise and a voluntary exercise for each apparatus. The 2 exercise scores were summed to give an apparatus total. No separate finals were contested.

Exercise scores ranged from 0 to 10 and apparatus scores from 0 to 20.

== Results ==
Rank	Gymnast	Nation	Compulsory	Voluntary	Total
1st place, gold medalist(s)	Valentin Muratov	Soviet Union	9.60	9.60	19.20
2nd place, silver medalist(s)	Viktor Chukarin	Soviet Union	9.55	9.55	19.10
2nd place, silver medalist(s)	William Thoresson	Sweden	9.50	9.60	19.10
2nd place, silver medalist(s)	Nobuyuki Aihara	Japan	9.50	9.60	19.10
5	Yury Titov	Soviet Union	9.50	9.45	18.95
6	Ferdinand Daniš	Czechoslovakia	9.40	9.40	18.80
6	Mincho Todorov	Bulgaria	9.35	9.45	18.80
8	Helmut Bantz	United Team of Germany	9.35	9.40	18.75
8	Takashi Ono	Japan	9.40	9.35	18.75
10	Kalevi Suoniemi	Finland	9.35	9.35	18.70
10	Martti Mansikka	Finland	9.30	9.40	18.70
10	Shinsaku Tsukawaki	Japan	9.30	9.40	18.70
10	Masami Kubota	Japan	9.30	9.40	18.70
14	Kurt Wigartz	Sweden	9.25	9.40	18.65
15	Armando Vega	United States	9.20	9.40	18.60
16	Masao Takemoto	Japan	9.00	9.50	18.50
16	Jack Beckner	United States	9.25	9.25	18.50
16	Robert Klein	United Team of Germany	9.30	9.20	18.50
16	Pavel Stolbov	Soviet Union	9.15	9.35	18.50
16	Akira Kono	Japan	9.40	9.10	18.50
16	Onni Lappalainen	Finland	9.20	9.30	18.50
16	Berndt Lindfors	Finland	9.05	9.45	18.50
23	Theo Wied	United Team of Germany	9.20	9.20	18.40
23	Vladimír Kejř	Czechoslovakia	9.10	9.30	18.40
23	Attila Takács	Hungary	9.15	9.25	18.40
23	Abie Grossfeld	United States	9.10	9.30	18.40
23	Nik Stuart	Great Britain	9.20	9.20	18.40
28	Boris Shakhlin	Soviet Union	8.95	9.30	18.25
29	Jaroslav Mikoška	Czechoslovakia	9.10	9.10	18.20
29	Josy Stoffel	Luxembourg	9.20	9.00	18.20
29	Bill Tom	United States	9.00	9.20	18.20
29	Zdeněk Růžička	Czechoslovakia	9.00	9.20	18.20
33	Olavi Leimuvirta	Finland	8.95	9.20	18.15
33	Hans Pfann	United Team of Germany	8.85	9.30	18.15
33	Velik Kapsazov	Bulgaria	9.00	9.15	18.15
33	Michel Mathiot	France	9.00	9.15	18.15
37	Ed Gagnier	Canada	8.85	9.20	18.05
38	Jakob Kiefer	United Team of Germany	8.85	9.15	18.00
38	Josef Škvor	Czechoslovakia	8.90	9.10	18.00
40	Albert Azaryan	Soviet Union	8.90	9.05	17.95
41	Stoyan Stoyanov	Bulgaria	8.80	9.10	17.90
41	Dick Beckner	United States	8.85	9.05	17.90
41	Brian Blackburn	Australia	8.85	9.05	17.90
44	Jean Guillou	France	8.95	8.90	17.85
45	Erich Wied	United Team of Germany	8.60	9.20	17.80
46	Raimo Heinonen	Finland	8.60	9.15	17.75
47	Raymond Dot	France	8.60	9.10	17.70
48	Bruce Sharp	Australia	8.80	8.80	17.60
49	János Héder	Hungary	8.40	9.00	17.40
50	Charles Simms	United States	8.55	8.70	17.25
51	Noel Punton	Australia	8.55	8.50	17.05
52	Jaroslav Bím	Czechoslovakia	7.90	8.70	16.60
53	Frank Turner	Great Britain	8.05	8.50	16.55
54	Jack Wells	South Africa	8.45	8.05	16.50
55	Rafael Lecuona	Cuba	8.30	8.05	16.35
56	David Gourlay	Australia	8.25	8.00	16.25
56	Ronnie Lombard	South Africa	8.00	8.25	16.25
58	Graham Bond	Australia	7.65	8.00	15.65
59	Pritam Singh	India	7.80	7.30	15.10
60	John Lees	Australia	7.25	7.50	14.75
61	Sham Lal	India	6.45	6.80	13.25
62	Anant Ram	India	5.00	7.50	12.50
63	Hans Sauter	Austria	8.50	–	8.50
