= Gymnastics at the 1956 Summer Olympics – Men's parallel bars =

Olympic gymnastics event

Men's parallel bars at the Games of the XVI Olympiad
- Artistic gymnastics pictogram
- Venue: Festival Hall
- Dates: 3–7 December 1956
- Competitors: 63 from 18 nations
- Winning score: 19.20

Medalists
1st place, gold medalist(s)		Viktor Chukarin; Soviet Union
2nd place, silver medalist(s)		Masumi Kubota; Japan
3rd place, bronze medalist(s)		Takashi Ono; Japan
3rd place, bronze medalist(s)		Masao Takemoto; Japan

The men's parallel bars competition was one of eight events for male competitors in artistic gymnastics at the 1956 Summer Olympics in Melbourne. It was held from 3 to 7 December at the Melbourne Festival Hall. There were 63 competitors from 18 nations (down sharply from the 185 gymnasts in 1952), with nations in the team competition having up to 6 gymnasts and other nations entering up to 3 gymnasts. The event was won by Viktor Chukarin of the Soviet Union, the nation's first victory in the parallel bars. Japan took three medals: a silver by Masumi Kubota and bronzes by Takashi Ono and Masao Takemoto. It was the third time a nation had won three medals in the event in the same Games: the United States had swept the medals in 1904 and Switzerland had earned a gold and two bronzes in 1948. Chukarin was the third man to win multiple medals in the parallel bars; Ono would become the fourth in 1960.

== Background ==
This was the ninth appearance of the event, which is one of the five apparatus events held every time there were apparatus events at the Summer Olympics (no apparatus events were held in 1900, 1908, 1912, or 1920). Three of the top 10 gymnasts from 1952 returned: silver medalist Viktor Chukarin of the Soviet Union, fifth-place finisher Ferdinand Daniš of Czechoslovakia, and eighth-place finisher Valentin Muratov of the Soviet Union. Chukarin (the 1952 Olympic all-around champion) had won the 1954 world championships.

Australia and Canada each made their debut in the men's parallel bars; East and West Germany competed together as the United Team of Germany for the first time. The United States made its eighth appearance, most of any nation, having missed only the inaugural 1896 Games.

== Competition format ==
The gymnastics format continued to use the aggregation format, mostly following the scoring tweaks made in 1952. Each nation entered either a team of six gymnasts or up to three individual gymnasts. All entrants in the gymnastics competitions performed both a compulsory exercise and a voluntary exercise for each apparatus. The 2 exercise scores were summed to give an apparatus total. No separate finals were contested.

Exercise scores ranged from 0 to 10 and apparatus scores from 0 to 20.

== Schedule ==
All times are Australian Eastern Standard Time (UTC+10)

Date	Time	Round
Monday, 3 December 1956; Tuesday, 4 December 1956; Wednesday, 5 December 1956; Thursday, 6 December 1956; Friday, 7 December 1956	8:00	Final

== Results ==
Rank	Gymnast	Nation	Compulsory	Voluntary	Total
1st place, gold medalist(s)	Viktor Chukarin	Soviet Union	9.55	9.65	19.20
2nd place, silver medalist(s)	Masami Kubota	Japan	9.55	9.60	19.15
3rd place, bronze medalist(s)	Takashi Ono	Japan	9.60	9.50	19.10
3rd place, bronze medalist(s)	Masao Takemoto	Japan	9.40	9.70	19.10
5	Albert Azaryan	Soviet Union	9.30	9.70	19.00
6	Berndt Lindfors	Finland	9.45	9.45	18.90
6	Nobuyuki Aihara	Japan	9.35	9.55	18.90
8	Yury Titov	Soviet Union	9.40	9.45	18.85
8	Shinsaku Tsukawaki	Japan	9.45	9.40	18.85
8	Boris Shakhlin	Soviet Union	9.30	9.55	18.85
8	Onni Lappalainen	Finland	9.30	9.55	18.85
8	Olavi Leimuvirta	Finland	9.20	9.65	18.85
13	Helmut Bantz	United Team of Germany	9.45	9.35	18.80
13	Kalevi Suoniemi	Finland	9.25	9.55	18.80
15	Jack Beckner	United States	9.40	9.35	18.75
16	Ferdinand Daniš	Czechoslovakia	9.40	9.30	18.70
16	Akira Kono	Japan	9.40	9.30	18.70
16	Valentin Muratov	Soviet Union	9.30	9.40	18.70
16	Jaroslav Mikoška	Czechoslovakia	9.35	9.35	18.70
16	William Thoresson	Sweden	9.40	9.30	18.70
21	Raimo Heinonen	Finland	9.20	9.45	18.65
21	Attila Takács	Hungary	9.40	9.25	18.65
23	Hans Pfann	United Team of Germany	9.30	9.25	18.55
24	Stoyan Stoyanov	Bulgaria	9.35	9.15	18.50
24	Velik Kapsazov	Bulgaria	9.20	9.30	18.50
24	Martti Mansikka	Finland	9.15	9.35	18.50
27	Josef Škvor	Czechoslovakia	9.20	9.25	18.45
28	Raymond Dot	France	9.25	9.15	18.40
28	Charles Simms	United States	9.10	9.30	18.40
28	Michel Mathiot	France	9.10	9.30	18.40
31	Theo Wied	United Team of Germany	9.15	9.20	18.35
31	Bill Tom	United States	9.05	9.30	18.35
33	Zdeněk Růžička	Czechoslovakia	9.00	9.30	18.30
33	Robert Klein	United Team of Germany	9.20	9.10	18.30
33	Vladimír Kejř	Czechoslovakia	9.15	9.15	18.30
33	Nik Stuart	Great Britain	9.15	9.15	18.30
33	János Héder	Hungary	9.20	9.10	18.30
38	Jaroslav Bím	Czechoslovakia	9.15	9.10	18.25
39	Erich Wied	United Team of Germany	9.00	9.10	18.10
40	Mincho Todorov	Bulgaria	9.10	8.90	18.00
41	Pavel Stolbov	Soviet Union	8.55	9.40	17.95
41	Jean Guillou	France	9.35	8.60	17.95
43	Abie Grossfeld	United States	8.75	9.10	17.85
43	Kurt Wigartz	Sweden	8.80	9.05	17.85
43	Hans Sauter	Austria	9.05	8.80	17.85
46	Josy Stoffel	Luxembourg	9.30	8.50	17.80
47	Dick Beckner	United States	8.55	9.20	17.75
48	Jakob Kiefer	United Team of Germany	9.20	8.45	17.65
48	Frank Turner	Great Britain	8.75	8.90	17.65
48	Ed Gagnier	Canada	8.85	8.80	17.65
51	Armando Vega	United States	8.10	9.50	17.60
52	Rafael Lecuona	Cuba	8.50	8.95	17.45
53	Graham Bond	Australia	8.15	8.35	16.50
53	Bruce Sharp	Australia	8.20	8.30	16.50
55	John Lees	Australia	8.00	8.15	16.15
56	Brian Blackburn	Australia	8.45	7.25	15.70
57	David Gourlay	Australia	7.80	7.65	15.45
58	Jack Wells	South Africa	7.40	7.95	15.35
58	Noel Punton	Australia	7.70	7.65	15.35
60	Ronnie Lombard	South Africa	7.65	7.15	14.80
61	Pritam Singh	India	7.50	6.00	13.50
62	Sham Lal	India	6.25	7.10	13.35
63	Anant Ram	India	7.20	5.50	12.70
