= Gymnastics at the 1956 Summer Olympics – Men's rings =

Olympic gymnastics event

Men's rings at the Games of the XVI Olympiad
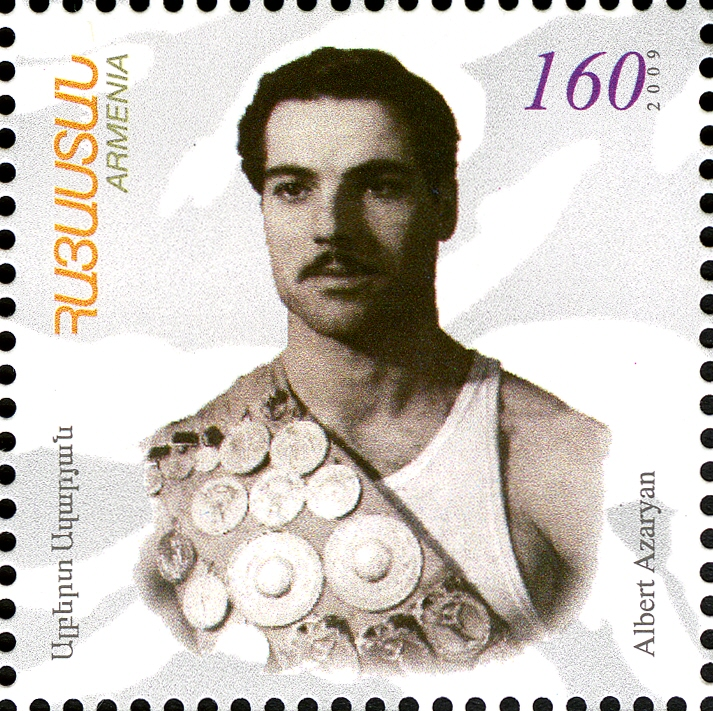
- Albert Azaryan depicted on Armenian stamp
- Venue: Festival Hall
- Dates: 3–7 December 1956
- Competitors: 63 from 18 nations
- Winning score: 19.35

Medalists
1st place, gold medalist(s)		Albert Azaryan; Soviet Union
2nd place, silver medalist(s)		Valentin Muratov; Soviet Union
3rd place, bronze medalist(s)		Masao Takemoto; Japan
3rd place, bronze medalist(s)		Masumi Kubota; Japan

The men's rings competition was one of eight events for male competitors in artistic gymnastics at the 1956 Summer Olympics in Melbourne. It was held from 3 to 7 December at the Melbourne Festival Hall. There were 63 competitors from 18 nations (down sharply from the 185 gymnasts in 1952), with nations in the team competition having up to 6 gymnasts and other nations entering up to 3 gymnasts. The event was won by Albert Azaryan of the Soviet Union, the nation's second consecutive victory in the rings. Another Soviet, Valentin Muratov, took silver (the second consecutive silver in the event for the Soviets, as well). Masumi Kubota and Masao Takemoto earned Japan's first medals in the event, tying for bronze.

== Background ==
This was the ninth appearance of the event, which is one of the five apparatus events held every time there were apparatus events at the Summer Olympics (no apparatus events were held in 1900, 1908, 1912, or 1920). Four of the top 10 gymnasts from 1952 returned: silver medalist Viktor Chukarin and fifth-place finisher Valentin Muratov of the Soviet Union, sixth-place finisher Masao Takemoto of Japan, and seventh-place finisher Berndt Lindfors of Finland. At the 1954 world championships, the Soviet Union had swept the top 6 places, with Albert Azaryan the victor.

Australia and Canada each made their debut in the men's rings; East and West Germany competed together as the United Team of Germany for the first time. The United States made its eighth appearance, most of any nation, having missed only the inaugural 1896 Games.

== Competition format ==
The gymnastics format continued to use the aggregation format, mostly following the scoring tweaks made in 1952. Each nation entered either a team of six gymnasts or up to three individual gymnasts. All entrants in the gymnastics competitions performed both a compulsory exercise and a voluntary exercise for each apparatus. The 2 exercise scores were summed to give an apparatus total. No separate finals were contested.

Exercise scores ranged from 0 to 10 and apparatus scores from 0 to 20.

== Schedule ==
All times are Australian Eastern Standard Time (UTC+10)

Date	Time	Round
Monday, 3 December 1956; Tuesday, 4 December 1956; Wednesday, 5 December 1956; Thursday, 6 December 1956; Friday, 7 December 1956	8:00	Final

== Results ==
Rank	Gymnast	Nation	Compulsory	Voluntary	Total
1st place, gold medalist(s)	Albert Azaryan	Soviet Union	9.55	9.80	19.35
2nd place, silver medalist(s)	Valentin Muratov	Soviet Union	9.60	9.55	19.15
3rd place, bronze medalist(s)	Masao Takemoto	Japan	9.60	9.50	19.10
3rd place, bronze medalist(s)	Masami Kubota	Japan	9.60	9.50	19.10
5	Takashi Ono	Japan	9.50	9.55	19.05
5	Nobuyuki Aihara	Japan	9.55	9.50	19.05
7	Viktor Chukarin	Soviet Union	9.40	9.60	19.00
7	Shinsaku Tsukawaki	Japan	9.50	9.50	19.00
9	Ferdinand Daniš	Czechoslovakia	9.45	9.45	18.90
10	Yury Titov	Soviet Union	9.40	9.45	18.85
10	Berndt Lindfors	Finland	9.45	9.40	18.85
12	Pavel Stolbov	Soviet Union	9.40	9.40	18.80
12	Kalevi Suoniemi	Finland	9.30	9.50	18.80
14	Robert Klein	United Team of Germany	9.40	9.35	18.75
15	Boris Shakhlin	Soviet Union	9.35	9.35	18.70
15	Akira Kono	Japan	9.40	9.30	18.70
17	Dick Beckner	United States	9.35	9.30	18.65
18	Helmut Bantz	United Team of Germany	9.25	9.35	18.60
19	Vladimír Kejř	Czechoslovakia	9.30	9.20	18.50
20	Velik Kapsazov	Bulgaria	9.20	9.25	18.45
20	Armando Vega	United States	9.05	9.40	18.45
22	Zdeněk Růžička	Czechoslovakia	9.10	9.20	18.30
23	Josef Škvor	Czechoslovakia	9.15	9.05	18.20
23	Martti Mansikka	Finland	9.15	9.05	18.20
23	Attila Takács	Hungary	8.95	9.25	18.20
23	Hans Pfann	United Team of Germany	9.10	9.10	18.20
27	Onni Lappalainen	Finland	8.95	9.20	18.15
28	Jaroslav Bím	Czechoslovakia	8.90	9.20	18.10
28	János Héder	Hungary	8.90	9.20	18.10
30	Theo Wied	United Team of Germany	9.05	8.75	17.80
31	Jack Beckner	United States	8.70	9.05	17.75
32	Jaroslav Mikoška	Czechoslovakia	8.75	8.90	17.65
32	Erich Wied	United Team of Germany	8.70	8.95	17.65
34	Charles Simms	United States	8.70	8.80	17.50
34	Abie Grossfeld	United States	9.20	8.30	17.50
36	Raymond Dot	France	8.85	8.60	17.45
37	Josy Stoffel	Luxembourg	8.50	8.90	17.40
38	Frank Turner	Great Britain	8.75	8.50	17.25
38	Hans Sauter	Austria	8.55	8.70	17.25
40	Olavi Leimuvirta	Finland	8.75	8.40	17.15
41	Michel Mathiot	France	8.60	8.40	17.00
42	Nik Stuart	Great Britain	9.15	7.70	16.85
42	Bill Tom	United States	8.10	8.75	16.85
42	Ed Gagnier	Canada	8.40	8.45	16.85
45	Raimo Heinonen	Finland	7.85	8.90	16.75
46	Jean Guillou	France	8.60	8.00	16.60
46	William Thoresson	Sweden	8.20	8.40	16.60
48	Jakob Kiefer	United Team of Germany	8.35	8.15	16.50
49	John Lees	Australia	7.95	8.45	16.40
50	Rafael Lecuona	Cuba	7.70	8.30	16.00
51	Bruce Sharp	Australia	8.10	7.85	15.95
52	Ronnie Lombard	South Africa	7.60	8.30	15.90
53	Jack Wells	South Africa	7.35	8.50	15.85
54	Stoyan Stoyanov	Bulgaria	7.05	8.60	15.65
55	Mincho Todorov	Bulgaria	7.65	7.90	15.55
56	David Gourlay	Australia	7.55	7.90	15.45
57	Kurt Wigartz	Sweden	6.90	8.40	15.30
58	Graham Bond	Australia	7.00	7.85	14.85
59	Brian Blackburn	Australia	7.50	7.05	14.55
60	Noel Punton	Australia	6.80	7.55	14.35
61	Sham Lal	India	6.90	6.60	13.50
62	Pritam Singh	India	6.00	4.75	10.75
63	Anant Ram	India	4.75	2.00	6.75
