= Soviet Union men's national artistic gymnastics team =

National sports team

Soviet Union
- Continental union: European Union of Gymnastics

Olympic Games
- Appearances: 9
- Medals: Gold: 1952, 1956, 1980, 1988; Silver: 1960, 1964, 1968, 1972, 1976

World Championships
- Appearances: 14
- Medals: Gold: 1954, 1958, 1979, 1981, 1985, 1987, 1989, 1991; Silver: 1962, 1966, 1970, 1974, 1978, 1983

The Soviet Union men's national artistic gymnastics team represented the Soviet Union in FIG international competitions. They, alongside Japan, were the dominant force in the sport from the 1950s until the Soviet Union's collapse. Nikolai Andrianov, who represented the Soviet Union at three Olympic Games, is the most decorated Olympic male gymnast, having won 15 medals.

== History ==
The Soviet Union won the team gold medal at the 1952 Summer Olympics – the first Olympics that the Soviet Union participated in. Throughout their existence the Soviet Union won four Olympic team golds and five Olympic team silvers, only ever losing to Japan. After the collapse of the Soviet Union, gymnasts from the former Soviet states competed at one last Olympic Games together as the Unified Team; they won team gold.

At the World Championships the Soviet Union won either gold or silver in the team event at every iteration that they competed in (1954–1991).

== Team competition results ==
=== Olympic Games ===
- 1952 — gold medal
  Vladimir Belyakov, Iosif Berdiev, Viktor Chukarin, Yevgeny Korolkov, Dmytro Leonkin, Valentin Muratov, Mikhail Perelman, Hrant Shahinyan
- 1956 — gold medal
  Albert Azaryan, Viktor Chukarin, Valentin Muratov, Boris Shakhlin, Pavel Stolbov, Yuri Titov
- 1960 — silver medal
  Albert Azaryan, Valery Kerdemilidi, Nikolai Miligulo, Vladimir Portnoi, Boris Shakhlin, Yuri Titov
- 1964 — silver medal
  Sergey Diomidov, Viktor Leontev, Viktor Lisitsky, Boris Shakhlin, Yuri Titov, Yuri Tsapenko
- 1968 — silver medal
  Sergei Diomidov, Valery Iljinykh, Valery Karasev, Viktor Klimenko, Victor Lisitsky, Mikhail Voronin
- 1972 — silver medal
  Nikolai Andrianov, Viktor Klimenko, Alexander Maleev, Edvard Mikaelian, Vladimir Schukin, Mikhail Voronin
- 1976 — silver medal
  Nikolai Andrianov, Alexander Dityatin, Gennady Krysin, Vladimir Marchenko, Vladimir Markelov, Vladimir Tikhonov
- 1980 — gold medal
  Nikolay Andrianov, Eduard Azaryan, Aleksandr Dityatin, Bogdan Makuts, Vladimir Markelov, Aleksandr Tkachyov
- 1984 — did not participate due to boycott
- 1988 — gold medal
  Vladimir Artemov, Dmitri Bilozertchev, Vladimir Gogoladze, Sergei Kharkov, Valeri Liukin, Vladimir Novikov
- 1992 — gold medal – participated as the Unified Team
  Valery Belenky, Igor Korobchinski, Grigory Misutin, Vitaly Scherbo, Rustam Sharipov, Alexei Voropaev

=== World Championships ===
- 1954 — gold medal
  Albert Azaryan, Viktor Chukarin, Sergei Dzhayani, Yevgeny Korolkov, Valentin Muratov, Hrant Shahinyan, Boris Shakhlin, Ivan Vostrikov
- 1958 — gold medal
  Albert Azaryan, Valentin Lipatov, Valentin Muratov, Boris Shakhlin, Pavel Stolbov, Yuri Titov
- 1962 — silver medal
  Valery Kerdemelidi, Viktor Leontyev, Viktor Lisitsky, Boris Shakhlin, Pavel Stolbov, Yuri Titov
- 1966 — silver medal
  Mikhail Voronin, Sergei Diomidov, Valery Kerdemelidi, Yuri Titov, Valery Karasev, Boris Shakhlin
- 1970 — silver medal
  Mikhail Voronin, Viktor Klimenko, Sergei Diomidov, Viktor Lisitsky, German Bogdanov, Valery Karasyov
- 1974 — silver medal
  Nikolai Andrianov, Edvard Mikaelian, Vladimir Marchenko, Paata Shamugiya, Vladimir Safronov, Viktor Klimenko
- 1978 — silver medal
  Nikolai Andrianov, Eduard Azarian, Alexander Dityatin, Gennady Krysin, Vladimir Markelov, Aleksandr Tkachyov
- 1979 — gold medal
  Alexander Dityatin, Aleksandr Tkachyov, Vladimir Markelov, Nikolai Andrianov, Bogdan Makuts, Artur Akopyan
- 1981 — gold medal
  Yuri Korolev, Bogdan Makuts, Alexander Dityatin, Aleksandr Tkachyov, Artur Akopyan, Pavel Sut
- 1983 — silver medal
  Dmitry Bilozerchev, Artur Akopyan, Alexander Pogorelov, Vladimir Artemov, Yury Korolev, Bogdan Makuts
- 1985 — gold medal
  Vladimir Artemov, Yuri Korolev, Valentin Mogilny, Yury Balabanov, Aleksei Tikhokikh, Aleksandr Tumilovich
- 1987 — gold medal
  Dmitry Bilozerchev, Valeri Liukin, Vladimir Artemov, Yuri Korolyov, Vladimir Novikov, Aleksei Tikhonkikh
- 1989 — gold medal
  Igor Korobchinsky, Vladimir Artemov, Valentin Mogilny, Vitaly Marinich, Valery Belenky, Vladimir Novikov
- 1991 — gold medal
  Vitaly Scherbo, Grigory Misutin, Valeri Liukin, Igor Korobchinsky, Valery Belenky, Alexei Voropaev

== Most decorated gymnasts ==
This list includes all Soviet male artistic gymnasts who have won at least four medals at the Olympic Games and the World Artistic Gymnastics Championships combined. This list does include medals won as the Unified Team at the Olympics and the Commonwealth of Independent States in 1992 but does not includes medals won under the flag of an independent nation after the dissolution of the Soviet Union. Also not included are medals won at the 1984 Friendship Games (alternative Olympics).

| Rank | Gymnast | Years | Team | AA | FX | PH | SR | VT | PB | HB | Olympic Total | World Total | Total |
|---|---|---|---|---|---|---|---|---|---|---|---|---|---|
| 1 | Nikolai Andrianov | 1972–1980 | 1980; 1972; 1976; 1979; 1974; 1978 | 1976; 1980; 1978; 1974 | 1972; 1976; 1980 | 1976; 1974 | 1976; 1974; 1978 | 1976; 1980; 1972; 1974; 1978; 1979 | 1976; 1974; 1978 | 1980 | 15 | 13 | 28 |
| 2 | Boris Shakhlin | 1954–1966 | 1956; 1960; 1964; 1954; 1958; 1962; 1966 | 1960; 1964; 1958; 1962 | | 1956; 1960; 1958; 1962 | 1960; 1964; 1962 | 1960; 1962 | 1960; 1958; 1962 | 1964; 1960; 1958; 1954 | 13 | 14 | 27 |
| 3 | Alexander Dityatin | 1976–1981 | 1980; 1976; 1979; 1981; 1978 | 1980; 1979; 1978 | 1980; 1978 | 1980 | 1980; 1976; 1979; 1981; 1978 | 1980; 1979 | 1980; 1981 | 1980; 1979 | 10 | 12 | 22 |
| 4 | Yuri Titov | 1956–1966 | 1956; 1960; 1964; 1958; 1962; 1966 | 1956; 1960; 1962; 1958 | 1960; 1958 | | 1962; 1958 | 1956; 1958 | | 1956; 1964; 1958 | 9 | 10 | 19 |
| 5 | Vladimir Artemov | 1983–1989 | 1988; 1985; 1987; 1989; 1983 | 1988; 1985; 1987 | 1988; 1987; 1989 | | | 1989 | 1988; 1983; 1987; 1989 | 1988; 1989 | 5 | 13 | 18 |
| 6 | Mikhail Voronin | 1966–1972 | 1968; 1972; 1966; 1970 | 1968; 1966 | | 1968; 1966 | 1968; 1972; 1966; 1970 | 1968 | 1968; 1966; 1970 | 1968 | 9 | 8 | 17 |
| 7 | Dmitry Bilozerchev | 1983–1988 | 1988; 1987; 1983 | 1988; 1983; 1987 | 1983 | 1988; 1983; 1987 | 1988; 1983; 1987 | | 1987 | 1983; 1987 | 4 | 12 | 16 |
| 8 | Viktor Chukarin | 1952–1956 | 1952; 1956; 1954 | 1952; 1956; 1954 | 1956 | 1952; 1956; 1954 | 1952 | 1952 | 1956; 1952; 1954 | | 11 | 4 | 15 |
| 9 | Vitaly Scherbo | 1991–1992 | 1992; 1991 | 1992; 1991 | 1991; 1992 | 1992; 1992 | 1992; 1992 | 1992; 1991 | 1992 | 1991 | 6 | 8 | 14 |
| 10 | Yuri Korolyov | 1981–1987 | 1981; 1985; 1987; 1983 | 1981; 1985; 1987 | 1981; 1985 | 1981 | 1985; 1987 | 1985 | | | 0 | 13 | 13 |
| 11 | Aleksandr Tkachyov | 1978–1981 | 1980; 1979; 1981; 1978 | 1979 | 1979 | | 1980; 1979 | | 1980; 1979 | 1981; 1979 | 3 | 9 | 12 |
| 12 | Valentin Muratov | 1952–1958 | 1952; 1956; 1954; 1958 | 1954 | 1956; 1954 | | 1956; 1954 | 1956 | | 1954 | 5 | 6 | 11 |
| 13 | Ihor Korobchynskyi | 1989–1992 | 1992; 1989; 1991 | 1989 | 1989; 1991; 1992 | | | 1992 | 1992; 1991 | 1992 | 2 | 9 | 11 |
| 14 | Hrihoriy Misyutin | 1991–1992 | 1992; 1991 | 1992; 1991 | 1992 | | 1991; 1992 | 1992 | | 1992; 1992 | 5 | 5 | 10 |
| 15 | Albert Azaryan | 1954–1960 | 1956; 1960; 1954; 1958 | | | | 1956; 1960; 1954; 1958 | | | 1958 | 4 | 5 | 9 |
| 16 | Viktor Klimenko | 1968–1974 | 1968; 1972; 1970; 1974 | | | 1972; 1970 | | 1972; 1970 | 1968 | | 5 | 4 | 9 |
| 17 | Valeri Liukin | 1987–1991 | 1988; 1987; 1991 | 1988; 1991 | | | | | 1988 | 1988 | 4 | 3 | 7 |
| 17 | Hrant Shahinyan | 1952–1954 | 1952; 1954 | 1952 | 1954 | 1952; 1954 | 1952 | | | | 4 | 3 | 7 |
| 19 | Artur Akopyan | 1979–1983 | 1979; 1981; 1983 | 1983 | | | | 1983; 1981 | | 1981 | 0 | 7 | 7 |
| 20 | Viktor Lisitsky | 1962–1970 | 1964; 1968; 1962; 1970 | 1964 | 1964 | | | 1964 | | | 5 | 2 | 7 |
| 21 | Valeri Belenki | 1989–1992 | 1992; 1989; 1991 | 1992 | | 1991 | | | 1992 | | 2 | 4 | 6 |
| 22 | Pavel Stolbov | 1956–1962 | 1956; 1958; 1962 | | | 1958 | | | 1958 | 1962 | 1 | 5 | 6 |
| 23 | Sergey Diomidov | 1964–1970 | 1964; 1968; 1966; 1970 | | | | | 1968 | 1966 | | 3 | 3 | 6 |
| 24 | Yevgeny Korolkov | 1952–1954 | 1952; 1954 | | | 1952 | 1954 | | | | 2 | 2 | 4 |
| 24 | Vladimir Markelov | 1976–1980 | 1980; 1976; 1979; 1978 | | | | | | | | 2 | 2 | 4 |
| 26 | Vladimir Marchenko | 1974–1976 | 1976; 1974 | | 1976 | | | | 1974 | | 2 | 2 | 4 |

== See also ==
- Soviet Union women's national artistic gymnastics team
- Russia men's national artistic gymnastics team
- Soviet Union at the World Artistic Gymnastics Championships
