= Gymnastics at the 1956 Summer Olympics – Men's artistic team all-around =

Men's artistic team all-around at the Games of the XVI Olympiad
- Venue: West Melbourne Stadium
- Date: 3–7 December
- Competitors: 42 from 7 nations
- Winning score: 568.25

Medalists
1st place, gold medalist(s)		Albert Azaryan; Viktor Chukarin; Valentin Muratov; Boris Shakhlin; Pavel Stolbov; Yuri Titov	Soviet Union
2nd place, silver medalist(s)		Nobuyuki Aihara; Akira Kono; Masami Kubota; Takashi Ono; Masao Takemoto; Shinsaku Tsukawaki	Japan
3rd place, bronze medalist(s)		Raimo Heinonen; Olavi Laimuvirta; Onni Lappalainen; Berndt Lindfors; Martti Mansikka; Kalevi Suoniemi	Finland

The men's artistic team all-around competition at the 1956 Summer Olympics was held at the West Melbourne Stadium from 3 to 7 December. It was the eleventh appearance of the event.

== Competition format ==
The gymnastics format continued to use the aggregation format, mostly following the scoring tweaks made in 1952. Each nation entered a team of six gymnasts (two alternates could be entered—in 1952, all eight gymnasts competed). All entrants in the gymnastics competitions performed both a compulsory exercise and a voluntary exercise for each apparatus. The top five individual scores in each exercise (that is, compulsory floor, voluntary floor, compulsory vault, etc.) were added to give a team score for that exercise. The 12 team exercise scores were summed to give a team total.

No separate finals were contested.

Exercise scores ranged from 0 to 10, apparatus scores from 0 to 20, individual totals from 0 to 120, and team scores from 0 to 600.

== Results ==
Rank	Nation	Gymnasts	Exercise results												Team total
Rank	Nation	Gymnasts	Floor (gymnastics)		Rings (gymnastics)		Pommel horse		Vault (gymnastics)		Parallel bars		Horizontal bar		Team total
Rank	Nation	Gymnasts	C	V	C	V	C	V	C	V	C	V	C	V	Team total
1st place, gold medalist(s)	Soviet Union	Albert Azaryan	~~8.90~~	~~9.05~~	9.55	9.80	~~9.25~~	9.50	9.15	9.40	9.30	9.70	9.40	9.55	568.25
1st place, gold medalist(s)	Soviet Union	Viktor Chukarin	9.55	9.55	9.40	9.60	9.50	9.60	9.25	9.35	9.55	9.65	9.55	9.70	568.25
1st place, gold medalist(s)	Soviet Union	Valentin Muratov	9.60	9.60	9.60	9.55	9.45	~~9.35~~	9.40	9.45	9.30	9.40	9.55	~~9.05~~	568.25
1st place, gold medalist(s)	Soviet Union	Boris Shakhlin	8.95	9.30	~~9.35~~	~~9.35~~	9.50	9.75	9.35	9.35	9.30	9.55	~~9.30~~	9.45	568.25
1st place, gold medalist(s)	Soviet Union	Pavel Stolbov	9.15	9.35	9.40	9.40	9.40	9.50	~~9.10~~	~~9.25~~	~~8.55~~	~~9.40~~	9.55	9.70	568.25
1st place, gold medalist(s)	Soviet Union	Yury Titov	9.50	9.45	9.40	9.45	9.45	9.55	9.35	9.40	9.40	9.45	9.70	9.70	568.25
1st place, gold medalist(s)	Soviet Union	Total	46.75	47.25	47.35	47.80	47.30	47.90	46.50	46.95	46.85	47.75	47.75	48.10	568.25
2nd place, silver medalist(s)	Japan	Nobuyuki Aihara	9.50	9.60	9.55	9.50	9.35	9.40	9.20	~~8.90~~	~~9.35~~	9.55	9.30	~~9.25~~	566.40
2nd place, silver medalist(s)	Japan	Akira Kono	9.40	~~9.10~~	~~9.40~~	~~9.30~~	~~9.00~~	9.60	~~9.00~~	9.30	9.40	~~9.30~~	9.30	9.45	566.40
2nd place, silver medalist(s)	Japan	Masami Kubota	~~9.30~~	9.40	9.60	9.50	9.35	9.30	9.25	9.05	9.55	9.60	~~9.20~~	9.40	566.40
2nd place, silver medalist(s)	Japan	Takashi Ono	9.40	9.35	9.50	9.55	9.50	9.70	9.20	9.30	9.60	9.50	9.75	9.85	566.40
2nd place, silver medalist(s)	Japan	Masao Takemoto	9.00	9.50	9.60	9.50	9.45	9.45	9.20	9.45	9.40	9.70	9.70	9.60	566.40
2nd place, silver medalist(s)	Japan	Shinsaku Tsukawaki	9.30	9.40	9.50	9.50	9.20	~~9.25~~	9.20	9.25	9.45	9.40	9.30	9.45	566.40
2nd place, silver medalist(s)	Japan	Total	46.90	47.25	47.75	47.55	46.85	47.45	46.05	46.35	47.40	47.75	47.35	47.75	566.40
3rd place, bronze medalist(s)	Finland	Raimo Heinonen	~~8.60~~	~~9.15~~	~~7.85~~	8.90	~~8.90~~	~~9.25~~	9.05	~~9.05~~	9.20	9.45	9.25	9.45	555.95
3rd place, bronze medalist(s)	Finland	Onni Lappalainen	9.20	9.30	8.95	9.20	9.05	9.40	9.00	9.25	9.30	9.55	9.00	9.25	555.95
3rd place, bronze medalist(s)	Finland	Olavi Leimuvirta	8.95	9.20	8.75	~~8.40~~	9.35	9.30	9.10	9.30	9.20	9.65	8.95	9.20	555.95
3rd place, bronze medalist(s)	Finland	Berndt Lindfors	9.05	9.45	9.45	9.40	9.45	9.35	~~8.80~~	9.10	9.45	9.45	9.20	9.45	555.95
3rd place, bronze medalist(s)	Finland	Martti Mansikka	9.30	9.40	9.15	9.05	9.30	9.35	9.20	9.35	~~9.15~~	~~9.35~~	~~8.90~~	~~9.10~~	555.95
3rd place, bronze medalist(s)	Finland	Kalevi Suoniemi	9.35	9.35	9.30	9.50	9.35	9.45	9.15	9.40	9.25	9.55	9.25	9.45	555.95
3rd place, bronze medalist(s)	Finland	Total	45.85	46.70	45.60	46.05	46.50	46.85	45.50	46.40	46.40	47.65	45.65	46.80	555.95
4	Czechoslovakia	Jaroslav Bím	~~7.90~~	~~8.70~~	8.90	9.20	9.35	9.60	~~9.00~~	~~9.00~~	9.15	~~9.10~~	~~9.05~~	9.30	554.10
4	Czechoslovakia	Ferdinand Daniš	9.40	9.40	9.45	9.45	9.40	8.85	9.30	9.10	9.40	9.30	9.45	9.40	554.10
4	Czechoslovakia	Vladimír Kejř	9.10	9.30	9.30	9.20	~~9.15~~	9.10	9.10	9.45	9.15	9.15	9.20	9.10	554.10
4	Czechoslovakia	Jaroslav Mikoška	9.10	9.10	~~8.75~~	~~8.90~~	9.35	8.75	9.20	9.20	9.35	9.35	9.35	~~8.95~~	554.10
4	Czechoslovakia	Zdeněk Růžička	9.00	9.20	9.10	9.20	9.15	~~8.70~~	9.10	9.10	~~9.00~~	9.30	9.45	9.35	554.10
4	Czechoslovakia	Josef Škvor	8.90	9.10	9.15	9.05	9.45	9.60	9.20	9.25	9.20	9.25	9.20	9.50	554.10
4	Czechoslovakia	Total	45.50	46.10	45.90	46.10	46.70	45.90	45.90	46.10	46.25	46.35	46.65	46.65	554.10
5	United Team of Germany	Helmut Bantz	9.35	9.40	9.25	9.35	9.35	9.40	9.40	9.45	9.45	9.35	9.50	9.65	552.45
5	United Team of Germany	Jakob Kiefer	8.85	~~9.15~~	~~8.35~~	~~8.15~~	9.20	8.85	9.30	9.30	9.20	~~8.45~~	9.25	9.40	552.45
5	United Team of Germany	Robert Klein	9.30	9.20	9.40	9.35	8.95	9.05	9.30	9.30	9.20	9.10	9.25	9.20	552.45
5	United Team of Germany	Hans Pfann	8.85	9.30	9.10	9.10	9.25	8.95	~~9.05~~	~~9.25~~	9.30	9.25	~~8.55~~	~~9.20~~	552.45
5	United Team of Germany	Erich Wied	~~8.60~~	9.20	8.70	8.95	~~8.60~~	~~8.70~~	9.20	9.30	9.00	9.10	8.65	9.50	552.45
5	United Team of Germany	Theo Wied	9.20	9.20	9.05	8.75	8.90	9.05	9.30	9.40	~~9.15~~	9.20	9.25	9.45	552.45
5	United Team of Germany	Total	45.55	46.30	45.50	45.50	45.65	45.30	46.50	46.75	46.30	46.00	45.90	47.20	552.45
6	United States	Dick Beckner	8.85	9.05	9.35	9.30	8.70	8.80	8.85	9.20	8.55	9.20	9.10	9.35	547.50
6	United States	Jack Beckner	9.25	9.25	8.70	9.05	9.30	9.10	9.25	9.35	9.40	9.35	9.40	9.60	547.50
6	United States	Abie Grossfeld	9.10	9.30	9.20	~~8.30~~	8.65	~~8.65~~	~~8.85~~	~~9.10~~	8.75	~~9.10~~	9.35	9.40	547.50
6	United States	Charles Simms	~~8.55~~	~~8.70~~	8.70	8.80	9.35	8.80	9.15	9.30	9.10	9.30	9.20	9.45	547.50
6	United States	Bill Tom	9.00	9.20	~~8.10~~	8.75	8.60	9.15	9.10	9.25	9.05	9.30	~~8.80~~	9.05	547.50
6	United States	Armando Vega	9.20	9.40	9.05	9.40	~~8.60~~	8.75	9.10	9.30	~~8.10~~	9.50	9.15	~~8.90~~	547.50
6	United States	Total	45.40	46.20	45.00	45.30	44.60	44.60	45.45	46.40	44.85	46.65	46.20	46.85	547.50
7	Australia	Brian Blackburn	8.85	9.05	7.50	~~7.05~~	~~5.00~~	7.10	9.00	8.95	8.45	~~7.25~~	8.20	5.00	477.15
7	Australia	Graham Bond	7.65	8.00	7.00	7.85	6.95	7.00	9.00	~~8.80~~	8.15	8.35	8.90	8.75	477.15
7	Australia	David Gourlay	8.25	8.00	7.55	7.90	7.50	7.20	9.00	9.05	7.80	7.65	8.10	7.90	477.15
7	Australia	John Lees	~~7.25~~	~~7.50~~	7.95	8.45	7.70	7.85	~~7.50~~	8.90	8.00	8.15	7.70	6.10	477.15
7	Australia	Noel Punton	8.55	8.50	~~6.80~~	7.55	5.50	7.10	9.05	8.85	~~7.70~~	7.65	~~4.50~~	~~4.00~~	477.15
7	Australia	Bruce Sharp	8.80	8.80	8.10	7.85	5.65	~~4.95~~	9.25	9.10	8.20	8.30	7.30	6.65	477.15
7	Australia	Total	42.10	42.35	38.10	39.60	33.30	36.25	45.30	44.85	40.60	40.10	40.20	34.40	477.15
