= Japan at the 1956 Summer Olympics =

- IOC code: JPN
- NOC: Japanese Olympic Committee

in Melbourne/Stockholm
- Competitors: 110 in 13 sports
- Flag bearer: Shozo Sasahara
- Medals Ranked 10th: Gold 4 Silver 10 Bronze 5 Total 19

Summer Olympics appearances (overview)
- 1912; 1920; 1924; 1928; 1932; 1936; 1948; 1952; 1956; 1960; 1964; 1968; 1972; 1976; 1980; 1984; 1988; 1992; 1996; 2000; 2004; 2008; 2012; 2016; 2020; 2024; 2028

Japan competed at the 1956 Summer Olympics in Melbourne, Australia and Stockholm, Sweden (equestrian events). 110 competitors, 94 men and 16 women, took part in 71 events in 13 sports.

Takashi Ono from gymnastics is the most successful athlete with 1 gold, 3 silver and 1 bronze.

== Medalists ==
Medal	Name	Sport	Event	Date
Gold	Mitsuo Ikeda	Wrestling	Men's freestyle welterweight	1 December
Gold	Shozo Sasahara	Wrestling	Men's freestyle featherweight	1 December
Gold	Masaru Furukawa	Swimming	Men's 200 m breaststroke	6 December
Gold	Takashi Ono	Gymnastics	Men's horizontal bar	7 December
Silver	Takashi Ishimoto	Swimming	Men's 200 m butterfly	1 December
Silver	Shigeru Kasahara	Wrestling	Men's freestyle lightweight	1 December
Silver	Tsuyoshi Yamanaka	Swimming	Men's 400 m freestyle	4 December
Silver	Masahiro Yoshimura	Swimming	Men's 200 m breaststroke	6 December
Silver	Tsuyoshi Yamanaka	Swimming	Men's 1500 m freestyle	7 December
Silver	Takashi Ono; Masao Takemoto; Masami Kubota; Nobuyuki Aihara; Akira Kono; Shinsaku Tsukawaki	Gymnastics	Men's artistic team all-around	7 December
Silver	Takashi Ono	Gymnastics	Men's individual all-around	7 December
Silver	Takashi Ono	Gymnastics	Men's pommel horse	7 December
Silver	Nobuyuki Aihara	Gymnastics	Men's floor	7 December
Silver	Masumi Kubota	Gymnastics	Men's parallel bars	7 December
Bronze	Takashi Ono	Gymnastics	Men's parallel bars	7 December
Bronze	Masao Takemoto	Gymnastics	Men's parallel bars	7 December
Bronze	Masao Takemoto	Gymnastics	Men's horizontal bar	7 December
Bronze	Masao Takemoto	Gymnastics	Men's rings	7 December
Bronze	Masami Kubota	Gymnastics	Men's rings	7 December

Medals by sport
Sport	1st place, gold medalist(s)	2nd place, silver medalist(s)	3rd place, bronze medalist(s)	Total
Wrestling	2	1	0	3
Gymnastics	1	5	5	11
Swimming	1	4	0	5
Total	4	10	5	19

== Athletics ==
Men's Marathon

- Yoshiaki Kawashima — 2:29:19 (→ 5th place)
- Hideo Hamamura — 2:40:53 (→ 16th place)
- Kurao Hiroshima — 3:04:17 (→ 33rd place)

== Cycling ==
Time trial

- Tetsuo Ōsawa — 1:13.3 (→ 12th place)

Individual road race

- Tetsuo Ōsawa — did not finish (→ no ranking)

== Diving ==
Men

Athlete	Event	Preliminary		Final			
Athlete	Event	Points	Rank	Points	Rank	Total	Rank
Yutaka Baba	3 m springboard	77.77	10 Q	49.10	11	126.87	12
Ryo Mabuchi	3 m springboard	70.82	18	Did not advance			
Yutaka Baba	10 m platform	70.76	10 Q	52.93	11	123.69	11
Ryo Mabuchi	10 m platform	69.76	11 Q	50.44	12	120.20	12

Women

Athlete	Event	Preliminary		Final			
Athlete	Event	Points	Rank	Points	Rank	Total	Rank
Hatsuko Hirose	3 m springboard	56.02	16	Did not advance			
Kanoko Tsutani	3 m springboard	63.99	6 Q	39.13	9	103.12	8
Hatsuko Hirose	10 m platform	46.15	12 Q	23.56	9	69.71	11
Kanoko Tsutani	10 m platform	48.45	10 Q	22.50	10	70.95	10

== Fencing ==
One fencer represented Japan in 1956.

Men's foil

- Masayuki Sano

Men's épée

- Masayuki Sano

Men's sabre

- Masayuki Sano

== Rowing ==
Japan had nine male rowers participate in one out of seven rowing events in 1956.

Men's eight

- Yozo Iwasaki
- Yasukuni Watanabe
- Sadahiro Sunaga
- Yoshiki Hiki
- Takashi Imamura
- Yasuhiko Takeda
- Masao Hara
- Junichi Kato
- Toshiji Eda (cox)

== Shooting ==
Six shooters represented Japan in 1956.

Men

Athlete	Event	Final	
Athlete	Event	Score	Rank
Choji Hosaka	50 m pistol	550	4
Choji Hosaka	25 m rapid fire pistol	563	15
Yukio Inokuma	Men's 50 metre rifle three positions	1110	36
Yukio Inokuma	Men's 50 metre rifle prone	594	24
Tokusaburo Iwata	Trap	155	23
Ujitoshi Konomi	Trap	140	30
Tomokazu Maruyama	Men's 50 metre rifle three positions	1085	40
Tomokazu Maruyama	Men's 50 metre rifle prone	584	43
Yoshihide Ueda	50 m pistol	526	17
Yoshihide Ueda	25 m rapid fire pistol	521	31

== Swimming ==
Men

Athlete	Event	Heat		Semifinal		Final	
Athlete	Event	Time	Rank	Time	Rank	Time	Rank
Manabu Koga	100 m freestyle	57.7	5 Q	58.1	=10	Did not advance	
Hiroshi Suzuki	100 m freestyle	58.4	=12 Q	58.0	9	Did not advance	
Atsushi Tani	100 m freestyle	57.1	2 Q	57.4	6 Q	58.0	7
Yoshiro Noda	400 m freestyle	4:49.9	27	—N/a		Did not advance	
Koji Nonoshita	400 m freestyle	4:37.4	7 Q	—N/a		4:38.2	7
Tsuyoshi Yamanaka	400 m freestyle	4:31.8	2 Q	—N/a		4:30.4	2nd place, silver medalist(s)
Yukiyoshi Aoki	1500 m freestyle	18:36.0	6 Q	—N/a		18:38.3	7
Tsuyoshi Yamanaka	1500 m freestyle	18:04.3	3 Q	—N/a		18:00.3	2nd place, silver medalist(s)
Seizaburo Yagi	1500 m freestyle	18:57.3	9	—N/a		Did not advance	
Keiji Hase	100 m backstroke	1:06.3	10 Q	1:06.5	=9	Did not advance	
Hideo Ninomiya	100 m backstroke	1:09.2	21	Did not advance			
Kazuo Tomita	100 m backstroke	1:06.4	11 Q	1:06.5	=9	Did not advance	
Masaru Furukawa	200 m breaststroke	2:36.1	1 Q	—N/a		2:34.7	1st place, gold medalist(s)
Masahiro Yoshimura	200 m breaststroke	2:38.6	3 Q	—N/a		2:36.7	2nd place, silver medalist(s)
Takashi Ishimoto	200 m butterfly	2:24.2	3 Q	—N/a		2:23.8	2nd place, silver medalist(s)
Manabu Koga; Atsushi Tani; Koji Nonoshita; Tsuyoshi Yamanaka; Hiroshi Suzuki	4 × 200 m freestyle	8:37.9	1 Q	—N/a		8:36.6	4

Women

Athlete	Event	Heat		Semifinal		Final	
Athlete	Event	Time	Rank	Time	Rank	Time	Rank
Hitomi Jinno	100 m freestyle	1:08.8	=23	Did not advance			
Yoshiko Sato	100 m freestyle	1:10.3	=30	Did not advance			
Setsuko Shimada	100 m freestyle	1:11.8	33	Did not advance			
Yukiko Otaka	400 m freestyle	5:28.7	22	—N/a		Did not advance	
Eiko Wada	400 m freestyle	5:27.2	20	—N/a		Did not advance	
Hitomi Jinno; Eiko Wada; Yoshiko Sato; Yukiko Otaka	4 × 100 m freestyle	4:35.8 NR	9	—N/a		Did not advance	
