= 1956 Summer Olympics medal table =

1956 Summer Olympics medals
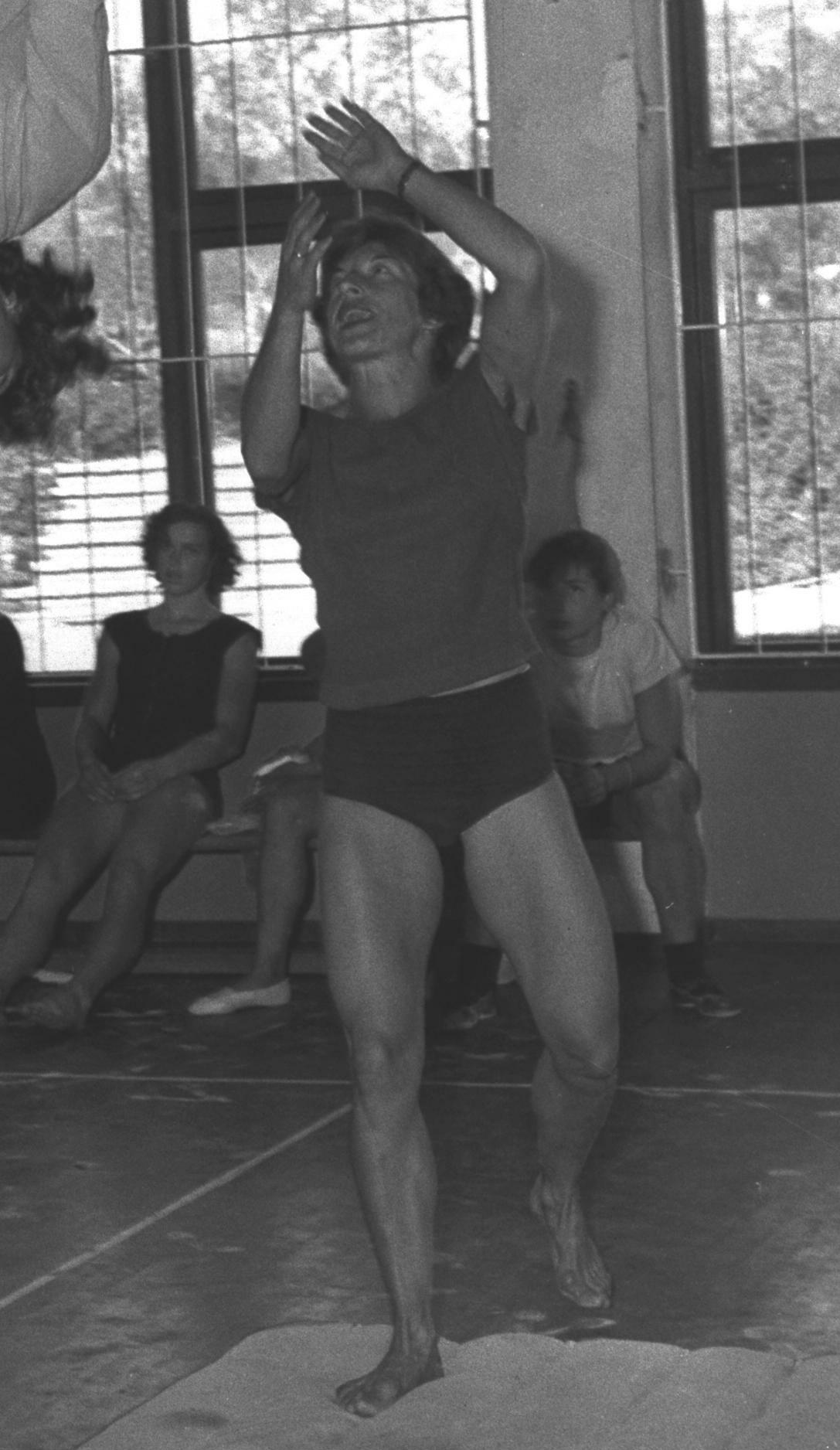
- Ágnes Keleti of Hungary was the most successful competitor at the games, winning four gold medals and two silver medals in women's gymnastics.
- Location: Melbourne, Australia

Highlights
- Most gold medals: Soviet Union (37)
- Most total medals: Soviet Union (98)
- Medalling NOCs: 38

World map showing the medal achievements of each country during the 1956 Summer Olympics Legend: represents countries that won at least one gold medal. represents countries that won at least one silver medal but no gold medals. represents countries that won at least one bronze medal (no gold or silver). represents participating countries that did not win medals. represents countries that participated in the equestrian events in Stockholm, but did not attend the games in Melbourne due to boycott and did not win medals. represents entities that did not participate at the 1956 Summer Olympics.

The 1956 Summer Olympics, officially known as the Games of the XVI Olympiad, and officially branded as Melbourne 1956, were an international multi-sport event held from 22 November to 8 December in Melbourne, Australia, with the equestrian events being held from 10 to 17 June 1956 in Stockholm, Sweden, due to Australian quarantine regulations that required a six-month pre-shipment quarantine on horses. Medals awarded in these cities bore different designs. A total of 3,314 athletes (Note: A total of 3,155 athletes participated in Melbourne and 159 athletes in Stockholm.) representing 72 National Olympic Committees (NOCs) participated, which was a record for the most NOCs at a single Olympics at the time. This figure included first-time entrants Cambodia, Ethiopia, Fiji, Kenya, Liberia, Malaya, North Borneo, and Uganda. The games featured 151 events (Note: There were 145 events held in Melbourne and 6 events in Stockholm.) in 17 sports across 23 disciplines.

The 1956 Summer Games were the first to be held in the Southern Hemisphere and Oceania, and the first games to hold events in two different countries, continents, and seasons. Multiple boycotts were enacted by nine teams against the games, though five of them competed in the equestrian events. (Note: Cambodia, Egypt, the Netherlands, Spain, and Switzerland) Egypt, Iraq, and Lebanon boycotted the games in response to the Suez Crisis. Cambodia, Liechtenstein, the Netherlands, Spain, and Switzerland boycotted the games in response to the Hungarian Revolution, during which the Soviet Union invaded the country. China continued its boycott of the games, which began in 1952 and lasted until 1984, over the participation of Taiwan.

Athletes representing 38 NOCs received at least one medal, and 25 NOCs won at least one gold medal. The Soviet Union won the most gold medals and the most overall medals, with 37 and 98 respectively. Iran and Bulgaria won their first Olympic gold medals. The Bahamas, Iceland, and Pakistan won their first Olympic medals.

Gymnast Ágnes Keleti of Hungary was the most successful competitor of the games, winning four gold medals and two silver medals for a total of six medals. Gymnast Larisa Latynina of the Soviet Union tied with Keleti for the most gold and overall medals for a competitor at the games, winning six medals with four gold medals, one silver medal, and one bronze medal.

== Medal table ==
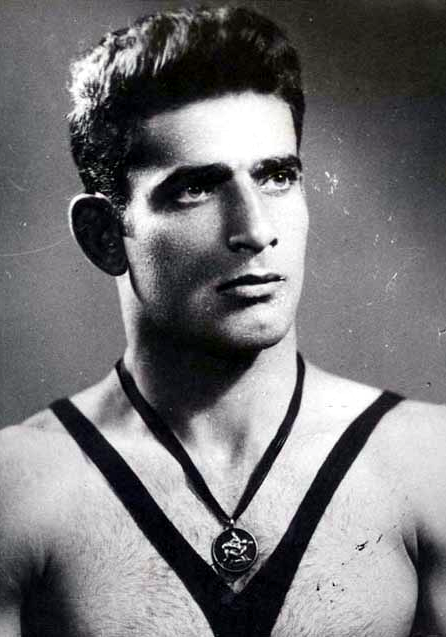
Wrestler Emam-Ali Habibi, the first-ever Olympic gold medalist for Iran.

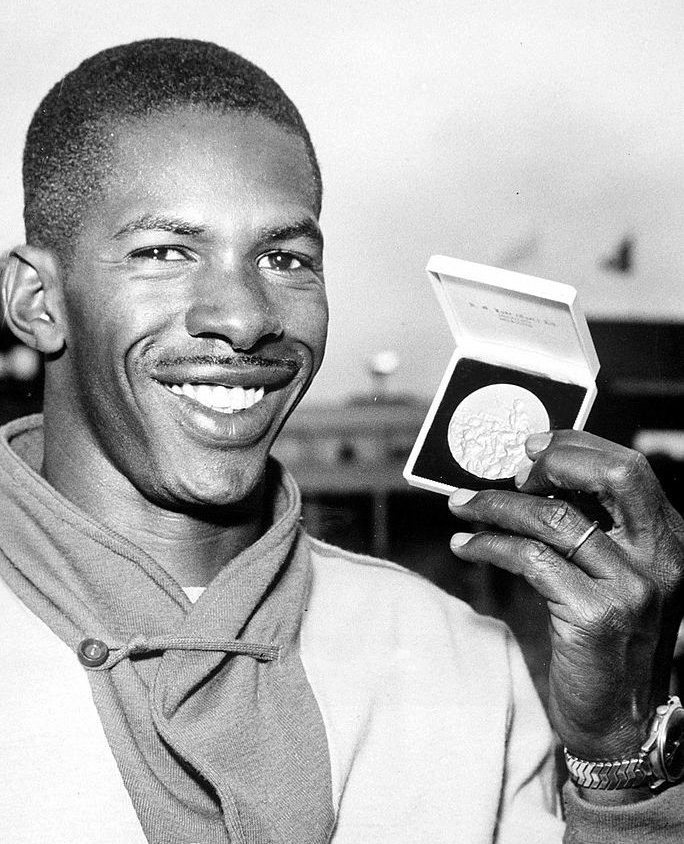
Triple jumper Adhemar da Silva of Brazil holding the gold medal he won at the games.

The medal table is based on information provided by the International Olympic Committee (IOC) and is consistent with IOC conventional sorting in its published medal tables. The table uses the Olympic medal table sorting method. By default, the table is ordered by the number of gold medals the athletes from a nation have won. The number of silver medals is considered next, followed by the number of bronze medals. Two bronze medals were awarded in each boxing event to the losing semi-finalists, instead of the competitors fighting in a third place tiebreaker.

In the gymnastics events, there were eight ties for medals. Two gold medals and no silver medal were awarded in the men's vault and women's floor exercise due to a first-place tie in both events. No bronze medals were awarded in the men's floor exercise and women's balance beam due to a second-place tie in both events, with the former being a three-way tie and all second-place athletes awarded a silver medal. Two bronze medals were awarded in the men's parallel bars, men's rings, women's team portable apparatus, and women's vault due to third-place ties in these events. In athletics, two silver medals and no bronze medals were awarded in the women's high jump due to a second-place tie. Two bronze medals were awarded in the men's 400 metres due to a third-place tie.

* Host nation (Australia)

1956 Summer Olympics medal table (Note: An additional bronze medal, not included in the table, was presented to John Ian Wing, an Australian resident, for advocating that the closing ceremony have athletes walk freely rather than marching under their own flag.)
Rank	Nation	Gold	Silver	Bronze	Total
1	Soviet Union	37	29	32	98
2	United States	32	25	17	74
3	Australia*	13	8	14	35
4	Hungary	9	10	7	26
5	Italy	8	8	9	25
6	Sweden	8	5	6	19
7	United Team of Germany (Note: A unified team comprising East Germany and West Germany competed from the 1956 Winter Olympics to the 1964 Winter Olympics. This decision was made because of the splitting of Germany after World War II and a condition that the National Olympic Committee of the German Democratic Republic (East Germany) would be recognized if both nations agreed to compete under the same team.)	6	13	7	26
8	Great Britain	6	7	11	24
9	Romania	5	3	5	13
10	Japan	4	10	5	19
11	France	4	4	6	14
12	Turkey	3	2	2	7
13	Finland	3	1	11	15
14	Iran	2	2	1	5
15	Canada	2	1	3	6
16	New Zealand	2	0	0	2
17	Poland	1	4	4	9
18	Czechoslovakia	1	4	1	6
19	Bulgaria	1	3	1	5
20	Denmark	1	2	1	4
21	Ireland	1	1	3	5
22	Norway	1	0	2	3
23	Mexico	1	0	1	2
24	Brazil	1	0	0	1
24	India	1	0	0	1
26	Yugoslavia	0	3	0	3
27	Chile	0	2	2	4
28	Belgium	0	2	0	2
29	Argentina	0	1	1	2
29	South Korea	0	1	1	2
31	Iceland	0	1	0	1
31	Pakistan	0	1	0	1
33	South Africa	0	0	4	4
34	Austria	0	0	2	2
35	Bahamas	0	0	1	1
35	Greece	0	0	1	1
35	Switzerland	0	0	1	1
35	Uruguay	0	0	1	1
Totals (38 entries)		153	153	163	469

== See also ==
- All-time Olympic Games medal table
- 1988 Summer Paralympics medal table
- 1988 Winter Olympics medal table
