= David Gourlay =

David Gourlay may refer to:

- David Gourlay Sr. (born 1937), Scottish bowler
- David Gourlay (bowls) (born 1966), Scottish bowler
- David Gourlay (gymnast) (born 1937), Australian gymnast
