= Nonoshita =

Nonoshita (written: 埜下 or 野々下) is a Japanese surname. Notable people with the surname include:

- Koji Nonoshita (野々下 耕嗣, born 1937), Japanese swimmer
- Shoji Nonoshita (埜下 荘司, born 1970), Japanese footballer
- Yukari Nonoshita, Japanese opera singer
