= Yoshihide Ueda =

Japanese sport shooter

Personal information
- Born: 6 December 1926

Sport
- Sport: Sports shooting

Yoshihide Ueda (born 6 December 1926) is a Japanese sport shooter who competed in the 1956 Summer Olympics.
