= Masayuki Sano =

Japanese fencer

Personal information
- Born: 28 October 1919
- Died: 2000

Sport
- Sport: Fencing

Masayuki Sano (佐野 雅之, Sano Masayuki; 28 October 1919 – 2000) was a Japanese fencer. He competed in the individual foil, épée, and sabre events at the 1956 Summer Olympics.
