= Tomokazu Maruyama =

Japanese sport shooter

Personal information
- Born: 25 February 1925 Azusagawa, Japan

Sport
- Sport: Sports shooting

Tomokazu Maruyama (born 25 February 1925) is a Japanese sport shooter who competed in the 1956 Summer Olympics.
