= Koji Nonoshita =

Japanese swimmer

Personal information
- Born: 1937 (age 88–89)

Sport
- Sport: Swimming
- Strokes: freestyle

Koji Nonoshita (野々下 耕嗣, Nonoshita Kōji; born 1937) is a Japanese former freestyle swimmer. He competed in two events at the 1956 Summer Olympics.
