= Takashi Ono (gymnast) =

Japanese gymnast (born 1931)

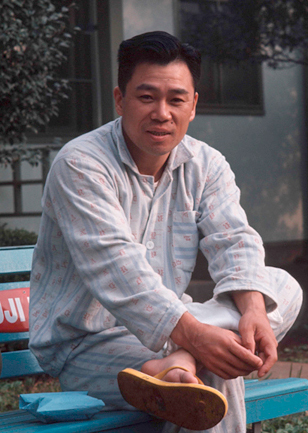
- Takashi Ono at the 1964 Olympics

Personal information
- Born: 26 July 1931 (age 95) Noshiro, Akita, Empire of Japan
- Height: 1.60 m (5 ft 3 in)
- Spouse: Kiyoko Ono (m. 1958; died 2021)

Gymnastics career
- Discipline: Men's artistic gymnastics
- Country represented: Japan
Medal record
Representing Japan
Olympic Games
Gold medal – first place	1956 Melbourne	Horizontal bar
Gold medal – first place	1960 Rome	Horizontal bar
Gold medal – first place	1960 Rome	Team
Gold medal – first place	1960 Rome	Vault
Gold medal – first place	1964 Tokyo	Team
Silver medal – second place	1956 Melbourne	All-around
Silver medal – second place	1956 Melbourne	Pommel horse
Silver medal – second place	1956 Melbourne	Team
Silver medal – second place	1960 Rome	All-around
Bronze medal – third place	1952 Helsinki	Vault
Bronze medal – third place	1956 Melbourne	Parallel bars
Bronze medal – third place	1960 Rome	Parallel bars
Bronze medal – third place	1960 Rome	Rings
World Championships
Gold medal – first place	1962 Prague	Horizontal bar
Gold medal – first place	1962 Prague	Team
Silver medal – second place	1958 Moscow	Parallel bars
Silver medal – second place	1958 Moscow	Floor
Silver medal – second place	1958 Moscow	All-around
Silver medal – second place	1958 Moscow	Team
Bronze medal – third place	1958 Moscow	Vault

Takashi Ono (小野 喬, Ono Takashi; born 26 July 1931) is a retired Japanese gymnast. He competed at the 1952, 1956, 1960 and 1964 Olympics and won five gold, four silver and four bronze medals, making him the most decorated Japanese athlete and fourth-most decorated gymnast in Olympic history by number of total medals won. Ono was the flag bearer for Japan at the 1960 Olympics, and took the Olympic Oath at the 1964 Games. In 1998, he was inducted into the International Gymnastics Hall of Fame.

== Gymnastics career ==
=== 1952 Helsinki Olympics ===
Ono made his Olympic debut at the 1952 Summer Olympics in Helsinki. He won his first Olympic medal, a bronze in the men's vault, sharing the position with his compatriot Tadao Uesako with a score of 19.10, behind the winner Viktor Chukarin of the Soviet Union.

=== 1956 Melbourne Olympics ===
At the 1956 Summer Olympics in Melbourne, Ono became the first Japanese gymnast to win an individual Olympic gold medal, claiming the title on the horizontal bar. He also won three silver medals in the all-around, pommel horse and team events, as well as a bronze on the parallel bars.

=== 1960 Rome Olympics ===
The 1960 Summer Olympics in Rome represented Ono's most successful Games. He was selected as the flag bearer for Japan during the opening ceremony. He won six medals in total, including gold on the horizontal bar, gold shared with Boris Shakhlin on the vault, and gold in the team competition — the first of five consecutive Olympic team golds for Japan. He narrowly missed the all-around gold, finishing second behind Shakhlin by 0.05 points.

=== 1962 World Championships ===
At the 1962 World Artistic Gymnastics Championships in Prague, Ono won two gold medals — on the horizontal bar and in the team event.

=== 1964 Tokyo Olympics ===
At the 1964 Summer Olympics in Tokyo, Ono served as the captain of the Japanese men's gymnastics team and was chosen to recite the Olympic Oath on behalf of all athletes during the opening ceremony. He competed with a serious right shoulder injury sustained during preparations for the Games, requiring anaesthetic injections to manage the pain. Despite this, he contributed to Japan's successful defence of the team gold medal before the home crowd.

In 1998, Ono's Olympic and World Championship combined total of 20 medals led to his induction into the International Gymnastics Hall of Fame.

== Personal life ==
In 1958, Ono married Kiyoko Ono, a fellow Olympic gymnast who competed for Japan at the 1964 Tokyo Olympics. They had two sons and three daughters; the first two children were born between 1961 and 1963 while both parents were actively competing. Kiyoko Ono died on 13 March 2021.

== See also ==
- List of multiple Olympic medalists at a single Games
- List of multiple Olympic medalists
- List of multiple Summer Olympic medalists
- List of Olympic medal leaders in men's gymnastics

Records
Preceded by (Italy) Edoardo Mangiarotti	Most career Olympic medals by a man 1964 – 1964	Succeeded by (Soviet Union) Boris Shakhlin
