= Yuri Titov =

Russian gymnast

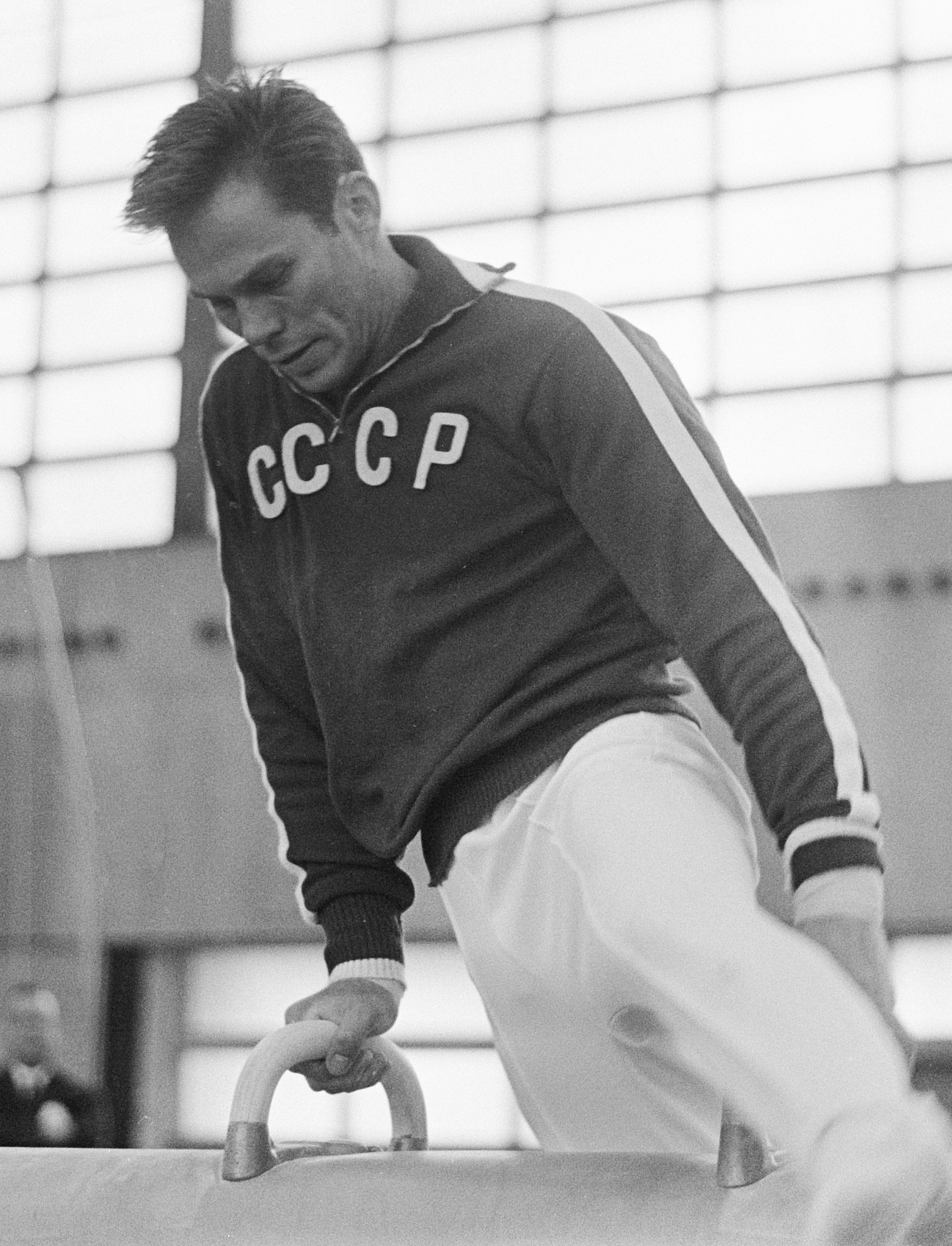
- Titov at the 1966 World Cup in Dortmund

Personal information
- Full name: Yuri Yevlampiyevich Titov
- Born: 27 November 1935 (age 90) Omsk, Russian SFSR, Soviet Union
- Height: 1.70 m (5 ft 7 in)

Gymnastics career
- Discipline: Men's artistic gymnastics
- Country represented: Soviet Union
- Club: Burevestnik Kiev
- Retired: yes
Medal record
Olympic Games
Gold medal – first place	1956 Melbourne	Team
Silver medal – second place	1956 Melbourne	Horizontal bar
Silver medal – second place	1960 Rome	Floor exercises
Silver medal – second place	1960 Rome	Team
Silver medal – second place	1964 Tokyo	Horizontal bar
Silver medal – second place	1964 Tokyo	Team
Bronze medal – third place	1956 Melbourne	Vault
Bronze medal – third place	1956 Melbourne	All-around
Bronze medal – third place	1960 Rome	All-around
World Artistic Gymnastics Championships
Gold medal – first place	1958 Moscow	Vault
Gold medal – first place	1958 Moscow	Team
Gold medal – first place	1962 Prague	Rings
Gold medal – first place	1962 Prague	All-around
Silver medal – second place	1962 Prague	Team
Silver medal – second place	1966 Dortmund	Team
Bronze medal – third place	1958 Moscow	Floor exercise
Bronze medal – third place	1958 Moscow	Rings
Bronze medal – third place	1958 Moscow	Horizontal bar
Bronze medal – third place	1958 Moscow	All-around

Yuri Yevlampiyevich Titov (Russian: Юрий Евлампиевич Титов; born 27 November 1935) is a former Russian gymnast, Olympic champion and four times world champion, who competed for the Soviet Union. He won a total of nine Olympic medals from three Olympic games (1956, 1960 and 1964).

== Olympics ==
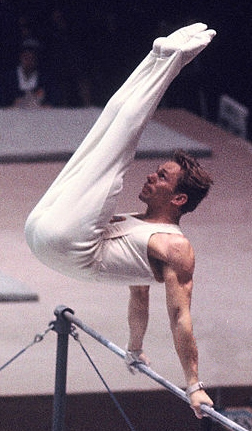
Titov at the 1964 Olympics

Titov competed at the 1956 Summer Olympics in Melbourne where he won a gold medal in team combined exercises with the Soviet team (with Viktor Chukarin, Valentin Muratov, Boris Shakhlin, Albert Azaryan and Pavel Stolbov). He also won an individual silver medal in horizontal bar, and bronze medals in all-around and vault. He won silver and bronze medals at the 1960 Summer Olympics in Rome, and two silver medals at the 1964 Summer Olympics in Tokyo.

== World championships ==
Titov won gold medals in vault and team at the 1958 World Artistic Gymnastics Championships in Moscow, and bronze medals in all-around, floor exercise, rings and horizontal bar.

He won gold medals in all-around and rings at the 1962 World Artistic Gymnastics Championships in Prague, as well as a team silver medal.

== European championships ==
Titov won 14 medals at the European Gymnastics Championships.

== Later career ==
Titov was president of the International Gymnastics Federation (FIG) for 20 years, from 1977 to 1996. As the FIG President, he was also a member of International Olympic Committee in 1995–1996. He was president of the Russian Artistics Gymnastics Federation from 2004 until 2006 and then first vice president.

== Writing ==
He has written and published four books, among others, one about rhythmic gymnastics (with Nadejda Jastriembskaja).

== Awards ==
Titov received the Olympic Order from the International Olympic Committee in 1992. He was inducted into the International Gymnastics Hall of Fame in 1999.

He received the Order of the Red Banner of Labour in 1960, and again in 1980. He received the Order of Friendship of Peoples in 1976, and the Order of the Badge of Honor in 1957.

== See also ==
- List of multiple Olympic medalists

Sporting positions
Preceded by Arthur Gander	President of the International Gymnastics Federation; 1977–1996	Succeeded by Bruno Grandi
