= Albert Azaryan =

Soviet Armenian artistic gymnast (1929–2023)

- Ալբերտ Ազարյան
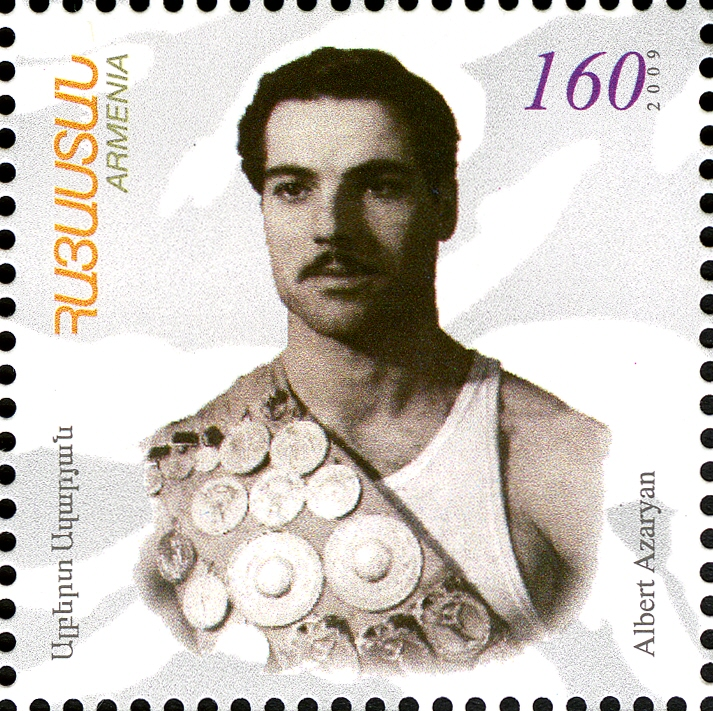

Personal information
- Born: 11 February 1929 Martunashen, Armenian SSR, Transcaucasian SFSR, USSR
- Died: 5 September 2023 (aged 94) Yerevan, Armenia
- Height: 5 ft 9 in (175 cm)
- Relatives: Eduard Azaryan (son)

Gymnastics career
- Discipline: Men's artistic gymnastics
- Country represented: Soviet Union
- Club: Spartak Yerevan
- Retired: 1960
Medal record
Olympic Games
Gold medal – first place	1956 Melbourne	Team
Gold medal – first place	1956 Melbourne	Rings
Gold medal – first place	1960 Rome	Rings
Silver medal – second place	1960 Rome	Team
World Championships
Gold medal – first place	1954 Rome	Team
Gold medal – first place	1954 Rome	Rings
Gold medal – first place	1958 Moscow	Team
Gold medal – first place	1958 Moscow	Rings
Silver medal – second place	1958 Moscow	Horizontal bar
European Championships
Gold medal – first place	1955 Frankfurt	Rings
Gold medal – first place	1955 Frankfurt	Parallel bars
Silver medal – second place	1955 Frankfurt	All-around
Silver medal – second place	1955 Frankfurt	Horizontal bar

Albert Azaryan (Armenian: Ալբերտ Ազարյան; 11 February 1929 – 5 September 2023) was a Soviet and Armenian artistic gymnast who competed internationally representing the Soviet Union. He was the 1956 and 1960 Olympic Champion on the still rings. Azaryan was the first gymnast to become an Olympic Champion in rings twice. He was the first person to do one of the rings' most famous variations of the Iron Cross called the Azaryan Cross (not to be confused with the Azarian Roll to Cross), which incorporates a quarter turn to the side.

== Early life ==
Azaryan was born on 11 February 1929 in Ganja Azerbaijan SSR, Kirovabad. At the age of 10 family moved to Martunashen, Transcaucasian SFSR. His father died when he was 14. Azaryan had to leave school and work as an ironsmith to support his family. When he was 17, a group of elite Armenian gymnasts gave an exhibition in his town. Afterwards, some teenage boys (including Azaryan) went on the apparatus and tried to perform the skills they had just seen. The gymnasts were so impressed with Albert that he was invited to move to Yerevan to train with them. After three years, he became the Armenian champion on rings and earned a Master of Sport ranking.

== Gymnastics career ==
Azaryan in the Netherlands (1977)

Azaryan competed at the USSR Championship in 1953. The judges were very strict, and Azaryan felt nervous. When it was his turn, Azaryan pulled himself up on the rings and performed his own special technique. The judges did not give him an assessment at the time, but he was invited to the next championship. It would later turn out that the judges had rated Azaryan's innovation as something "unprecedented". This technique Azaryan had performed would later become known as the "Azaryan Cross".

Azaryan became a member of the Soviet national men's gymnastics team and competed with them at the 1954 World Artistic Gymnastics Championships. Alongside Azaryan on the team was friend and fellow Armenian Hrant Shahinyan. The Soviet team won gold in the team competition, and Azaryan himself won the gold medal in rings. Azaryan joined the rest of the Soviet team at the 1955 European Men's Artistic Gymnastics Championships one year later. At this competition, Azaryan became the European Champion on rings. He finished behind teammate Boris Shakhlin in most of the competitions, including coming second to Shakhlin on high bar and in the individual all-around. He also finished in a three-way tie with Shakhlin and Helmut Bantz on the parallel bars, resulting in three gold medalists.

Azaryan competed at the 1956 Summer Olympics. He came in seventh place in the individual all-around. Azaryan won gold with the Soviet team in the team event. He also came in fifth in the parallel bars and eighth in the horizontal bar. When it came time for the still rings, Azaryan won the gold medal and became the Olympic Champion in rings. Two years later he competed at the 1958 World Artistic Gymnastics Championships. The Soviet team defended their World Championship team title, and Azaryan himself defended his own World Championships title on rings. He also won a silver medal on the horizontal bar.

In his final Olympic participation, Azaryan competed at the 1960 Summer Olympics. The Soviet team was unable to retain their Olympic title in the team event, coming in second to the Japanese team. Azaryan, however, won the Olympic gold medal on the still rings for a second time and made history as the first person to become an Olympic Champion in the rings twice. This feat has since been matched twice, first by Akinori Nakayama (1968, 1972) and later by Liu Yang (2020, 2024). Azaryan retired from gymnastics shortly afterward.

== Post-gymnastics and legacy ==
Azaryan was the flag bearer for Armenia at the 2004 Summer Olympics and 2008 Summer Olympics and is the third and fourth Olympian to bear the flag of Armenia at the Summer Olympics. He also became the first flag bearer to bear the flag of Armenia twice. Azaryan was originally intended to also bear the Armenian flag at the 2012 Summer Olympics, but the decision was reversed due to his age. Azaryan served as President of the Armenian Gymnastics Federation from 1998 to 2021.

An artistic gymnastics tournament, the Albert Azaryan Cup, is named after Azaryan and hosted in Yerevan, Armenia. Azaryan was voted the top Armenian athlete of the 20th century by journalists from the Armenian Sport Journalists Federation.

== Personal life and death ==
Azaryan had two daughters and one son with his wife. Neither of his daughters followed in his footsteps, but his son, Eduard Azaryan, also became an international gymnast. He became an Olympic champion at the 1980 Olympic Games, where the Soviet team won gold in the team event. Albert was the coach of Eduard throughout his career.

Azaryan received congratulations from late Armenian Prime Minister Andranik Margaryan on his 70th birthday, former Armenian President Robert Kocharyan on his 75th birthday, and former Armenian President Serzh Sargsyan on his 80th birthday. In honor of Azaryan, a stamp was printed of him, among other Armenian Olympic Champions, in Armenia in 2009.

Albert Azaryan died on 5 September 2023, at the age of 94.

== See also ==
- List of multiple Olympic gold medalists
- List of multiple Olympic gold medalists at a single Games
- List of multiple Olympic medalists
