= Martti Mansikka =

Finnish artistic gymnast (1933–2024)

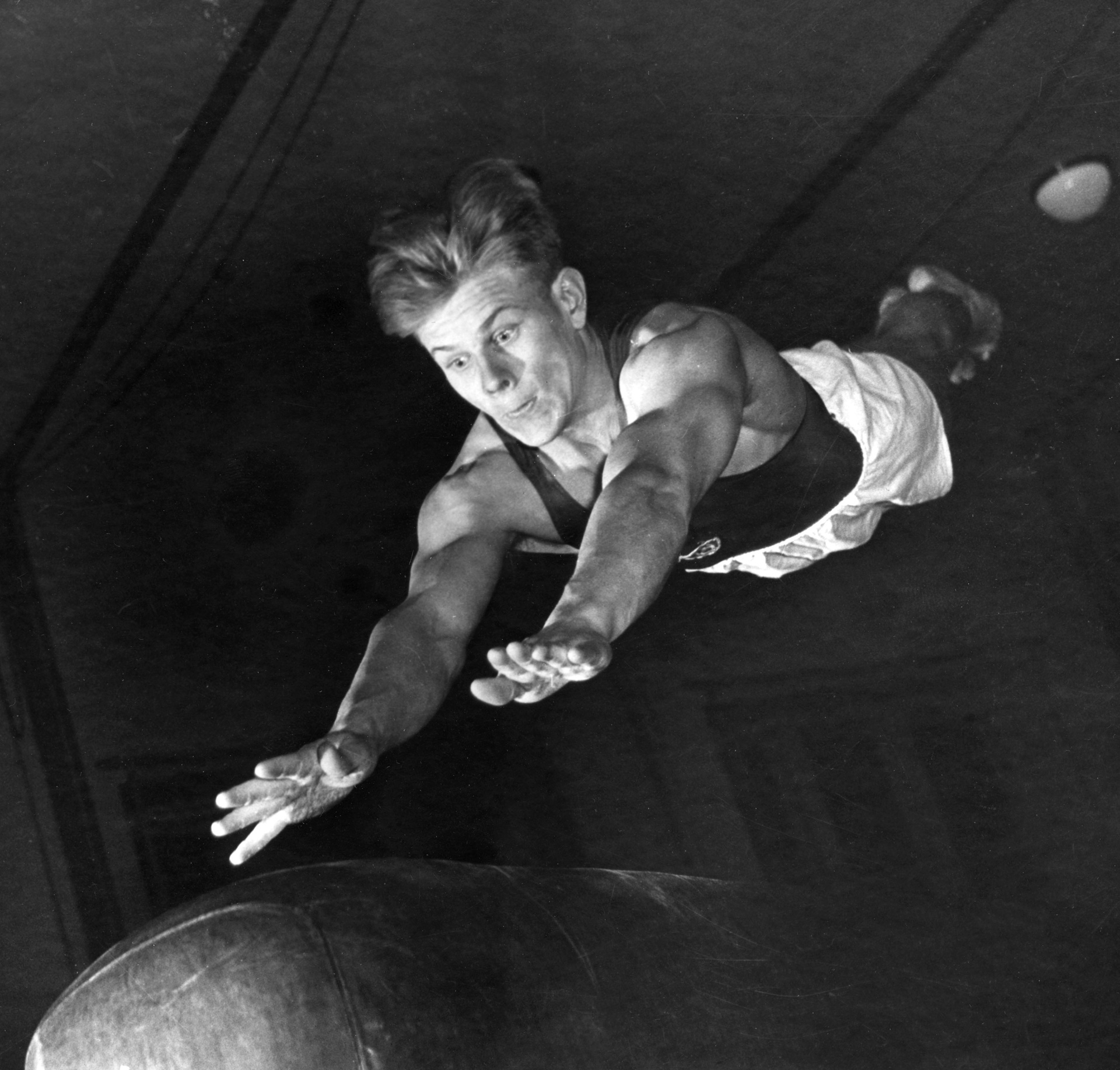

Personal information
- Full name: Mansikka c. 1956–1960
- Born: 25 October 1933 Antrea, Finland
- Died: 24 February 2024 (aged 90) Tampere, Finland
- Height: 169 cm (5 ft 7 in)

Gymnastics career
- Discipline: Men's artistic gymnastics
- Country represented: Finland
Medal record
Men's artistic gymnastics
Representing Finland
Olympic Games
Bronze medal – third place	1956 Melbourne	Team

Martti Mansikka (25 October 1933 – 24 February 2024) was a Finnish gymnast. He competed at the 1956 Summer Olympics in all artistic gymnastics events and won a team bronze medal. His best individual result was tenth place on floor. His team placed fourth at the 1958 World Championships. Domestically, Mansikka won the Finnish titles on floor, pommel horse and vault in 1957.

Mansikka died in Tampere on 24 February 2024, at the age of 90.
