= Onni Lappalainen =

Finnish gymnast (1922–1971)

- Full name: Onni Armas Lappalainen
- Born: 30 July 1922 Mikkeli, Finland
- Died: 12 January 1971 (aged 48) Mikkeli, Finland

Gymnastics career
- Discipline: Men's artistic gymnastics
- Country represented: Finland
Medal record
Men's artistic gymnastics
Representing Finland
Olympic Games
Bronze medal – third place	1952 Helsinki	Team
Bronze medal – third place	1956 Melbourne	Team

Onni Armas Lappalainen (30 July 1922, in Mikkeli – 12 January 1971, in Mikkeli) was a Finnish gymnast who competed in the 1952 Summer Olympics and in the 1956 Summer Olympics.
