= Raimo Heinonen =

Finnish artistic gymnast

- Full name: Raimo Yrjö Heinonen
- Born: 29 May 1935 (age 91) Turku, Finland

Gymnastics career
- Discipline: Men's artistic gymnastics
- Country represented: Finland
Medal record
Men's artistic gymnastics
Representing Finland
Olympic Games
Bronze medal – third place	1956 Melbourne	Team
European Championships
Silver medal – second place	1965 Antwerp	Vault

Raimo Yrjö Heinonen (born 29 May 1935 in Turku) is a Finnish former gymnast who competed in the 1956 Summer Olympics, in the 1960 Summer Olympics, and in the 1964 Summer Olympics.
