= Berndt Lindfors =

Finnish gymnast (1932–2009)

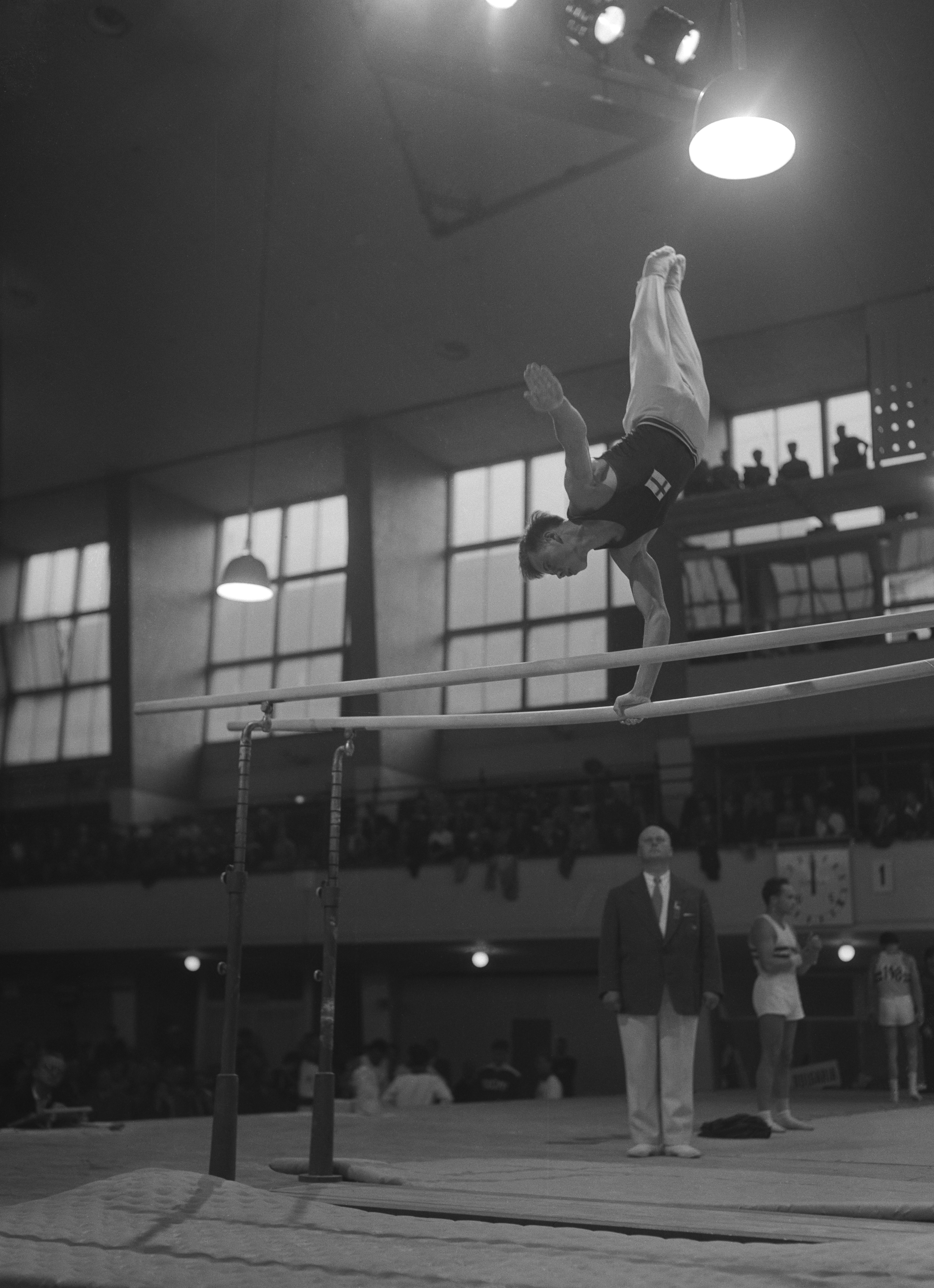
- Lindfors at the 1952 Summer Olympics

Personal information
- Full name: Berndt Torbjörn Lindfors
- Born: 21 October 1932 Helsinki, Finland
- Died: 19 February 2009 (aged 76)

Gymnastics career
- Discipline: Men's artistic gymnastics
- Country represented: Finland
Medal record
Men's artistic gymnastics
Representing Finland
Olympic Games
Bronze medal – third place	1952 Helsinki	Team
Bronze medal – third place	1956 Melbourne	Team

Berndt Torbjörn Lindfors (21 October 1932 – 19 February 2009) was a Finnish gymnast who competed in the 1952 Summer Olympics and in the 1956 Summer Olympics.
