= Olavi Leimuvirta =

Finnish artistic gymnast (1935–2026)

- Full name: Erkki Olavi Leimuvirta
- Born: 26 November 1935 Helsinki, Finland
- Died: 2 September 2026 (aged 90)

Gymnastics career
- Discipline: Men's artistic gymnastics
- Country represented: Finland
Medal record
Men's artistic gymnastics
Representing Finland
Olympic Games
| Bronze medal – third place | 1956 Melbourne | Team |

Erkki Olavi Leimuvirta (26 November 1935 – 2 September 2026) was a Finnish gymnast who competed in the 1956 Summer Olympics and in the 1960 Summer Olympics. Leimuvirta died on 2 September 2026, at the age of 90.
