= János Héder =

Hungarian gymnast

- Born: 20 October 1933 Budapest, Hungary
- Died: 6 September 2014 (aged 80) Budapest, Hungary

Gymnastics career
- Discipline: Men's artistic gymnastics
- Country represented: Hungary
- Club: Pécsi Vasutas Sportkör

János Héder (20 October 1933 – 6 September 2014) was a Hungarian gymnast. He competed in seven events at the 1956 Summer Olympics.
