= Akira Kono =

Japanese artistic gymnast

- 河野 昭
- Born: 11 September 1929 Uwajima, Ehime, Empire of Japan
- Died: 25 December 1995 (aged 66)

Gymnastics career
- Discipline: Men's artistic gymnastics
- Country represented: Japan
Medal record
Men's artistic gymnastics
Representing Japan
Olympic Games
| Silver medal – second place | 1956 Melbourne | Team |

Akira Kono (河野昭, Konō Akira; 11 September 1929 – 25 December 1995) was a Japanese gymnast who competed in the 1956 Summer Olympics.
