= Shinsaku Tsukawaki =

Japanese gymnast (1931–1993)

- 塚脇 伸作
- Born: 3 January 1931 Ōmuta, Fukuoka, Empire of Japan
- Died: 15 September 1993 (aged 62)

Gymnastics career
- Discipline: Men's artistic gymnastics
- Country represented: Japan
Medal record
Men's artistic gymnastics
Representing Japan
Olympic Games
Silver medal – second place	1956 Melbourne	Team

Shinsaku Tsukawaki (塚脇伸作, Tsukawaki Shinsaku; 3 January 1931 – 15 September 1993) was a Japanese gymnast who competed in the 1956 Summer Olympics.
