= Erich Wied =

German gymnast

- Born: 6 February 1923 Münster, Stuttgart, Weimar Republic
- Died: 28 September 1987 (aged 64) Stuttgart, West Germany
- Relatives: Theo Wied (brother)

Gymnastics career
- Discipline: Men's artistic gymnastics
- Country represented: West Germany
- Club: Turn- und Sportvereinigung Stuttgart-Münster 1875/99

Erich Wied (6 February 1923 – 28 September 1987) was a gymnast from Germany. Along with his twin brother, Theo, they competed at the 1952 and 1956 Summer Olympics in all artistic gymnastics events and finished in fourth and fifth place with the German team, respectively. Individually, they performed best on the vault in 1956, with a 16th place for Erich and a fourth place for Theo.
