= Brian Blackburn =

Australian gymnast (1928–2014)

- Full name: Brian Reginald Blackburn
- Born: 15 October 1928
- Died: 30 May 2014 (aged 85)

Gymnastics career
- Discipline: Men's artistic gymnastics
- Country represented: Australia

Brian Reginald Blackburn (15 October 1928 – 30 May 2014) was an Australian gymnast. He competed in eight events at the 1956 Summer Olympics.
