= Jaroslav Mikoška =

Czech gymnast (1933–1991)

- Born: 21 December 1933 Zlín, Czechoslovakia
- Died: 5 April 1991 (aged 57) Australia

Gymnastics career
- Discipline: Men's artistic gymnastics
- Country represented: Czechoslovakia

Jaroslav Mikoška (21 December 1933 – 5 April 1991) was a Czech gymnast. He competed in eight events at the 1956 Summer Olympics. Mikoška died in Australia on 5 April 1991, at the age of 57.
