= Bruce Sharp =

Australian gymnast (1931–2023)

- Full name: Bruce McLeod Sharp
- Born: 24 March 1931
- Died: 12 January 2023 (aged 91)

Gymnastics career
- Discipline: Men's artistic gymnastics
- Country represented: Australia

Bruce McLeod Sharp (24 March 1931 – 12 January 2023) was an Australian gymnast. He competed in eight events at the 1956 Summer Olympics.

Sharp died on 12 January 2023, at the age of 91.
