= John Lees (gymnast) =

Australian gymnast

- Full name: Asa John Lawrey Lees
- Born: 1931
- Died: 8 January 2008 (aged 76–77) Maryvale, Victoria, Australia

Gymnastics career
- Discipline: Men's artistic gymnastics
- Country represented: Australia

Asa John Lawrey Lees (1931 – 8 January 2008) was an Australian gymnast. He competed in eight events at the 1956 Summer Olympics.
