= Theo Wied =

German gymnast

Theod Wied
- Full name: Theodor Wied
- Born: 6 February 1923 Münster, Stuttgart, Weimar Republic
- Died: 24 July 1995 (aged 72) Stuttgart, Germany
- Relatives: Erich Wied (brother)

Gymnastics career
- Discipline: Men's artistic gymnastics
- Country represented: West Germany
- Club: Turn- und Sportvereinigung Stuttgart-Münster 1875/99

Theodor Wied (6 February 1923 – 24 July 1995) was a gymnast from Germany. Along with his twin brother Erich, they competed at the 1952 and 1956 Summer Olympics in all artistic gymnastics events and finished in fifth and fourth place with the German team, respectively. Individually, they performed best on the vault in 1956, with a 16th place for Erich and a fourth place for Theo.
