= David Gourlay (gymnast) =

Australian gymnast

- Full name: David Munro Gourlay
- Born: 1937 (age 88–89)

Gymnastics career
- Discipline: Men's artistic gymnastics
- Country represented: Australia

David Munro Gourlay (born 1937) is an Australian gymnast. He competed in eight events at the 1956 Summer Olympics.
