= Boris Shakhlin =

Soviet gymnast

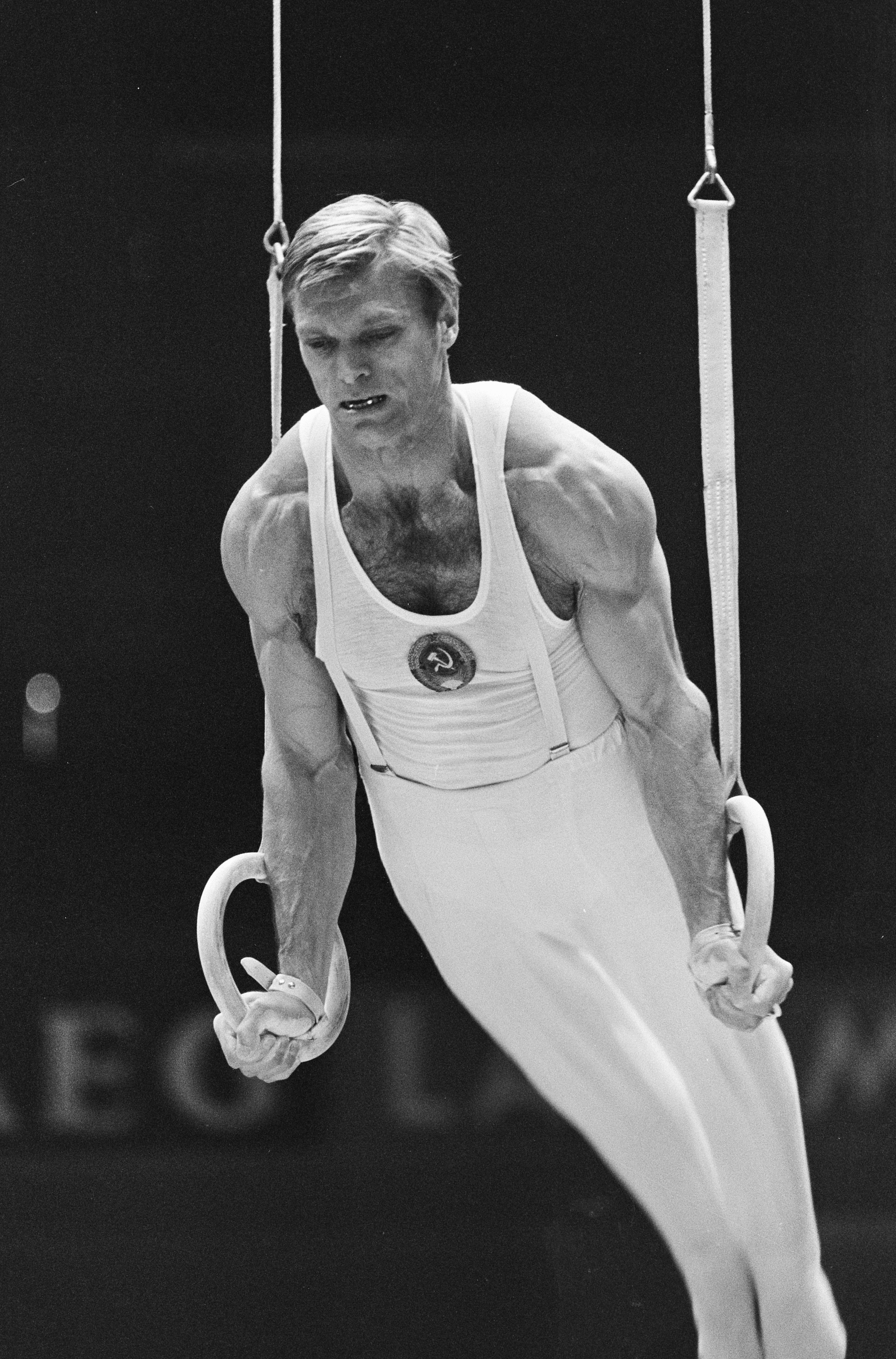
- Boris Shakhlin in 1966

Personal information
- Born: 27 January 1932 Ishim, Russian SFSR, Soviet Union
- Died: 30 May 2008 (aged 76) Kyiv, Ukraine
- Height: 1.71 m (5 ft 7 in)

Gymnastics career
- Discipline: Men's artistic gymnastics
- Country represented: Soviet Union
- Club: Burevestnik
- Retired: 1966
Medal record
Men's Artistic Gymnastics Representing Soviet Union
Olympic Games
Gold medal – first place	1956 Melbourne	Team competition
Gold medal – first place	1956 Melbourne	Pommel horse
Gold medal – first place	1960 Rome	All-around
Gold medal – first place	1960 Rome	Pommel horse
Gold medal – first place	1960 Rome	Vault
Gold medal – first place	1960 Rome	Parallel bars
Gold medal – first place	1964 Tokyo	Horizontal bar
Silver medal – second place	1960 Rome	Team competition
Silver medal – second place	1960 Rome	Rings
Silver medal – second place	1964 Tokyo	Team competition
Silver medal – second place	1964 Tokyo	All-around
Bronze medal – third place	1960 Rome	Horizontal bar
Bronze medal – third place	1964 Tokyo	Rings
World Championships
Gold medal – first place	1954 Rome	Team competition
Gold medal – first place	1958 Moscow	Team competition
Gold medal – first place	1958 Moscow	All-around
Gold medal – first place	1958 Moscow	Pommel Horse
Gold medal – first place	1958 Moscow	Parallel bars
Gold medal – first place	1958 Moscow	Horizontal bar
Silver medal – second place	1954 Rome	Horizontal bar
Silver medal – second place	1962 Prague	Team competition
Silver medal – second place	1962 Prague	Still rings
Silver medal – second place	1962 Prague	Parallel bars
Silver medal – second place	1962 Prague	Pommel Horse
Silver medal – second place	1966 Dortmund	Team competition
Bronze medal – third place	1962 Prague	All-around
Bronze medal – third place	1962 Prague	Vault
European Championships
Gold medal – first place	1955 Frankfurt	All-around
Gold medal – first place	1955 Frankfurt	Parallel bars
Gold medal – first place	1955 Frankfurt	Pommel horse
Gold medal – first place	1955 Frankfurt	Horizontal bar
Gold medal – first place	1963 Belgrade	Still rings
Gold medal – first place	1963 Belgrade	Horizontal bar
Silver medal – second place	1955 Frankfurt	Still rings
Silver medal – second place	1963 Belgrade	All-around
Silver medal – second place	1963 Belgrade	Parallel bars
Bronze medal – third place	1963 Belgrade	Pommel horse

Boris Anfiyanovich Shakhlin (Russian: Борис Анфиянович Шахлин; 27 January 1932 – 30 May 2008) was a Soviet gymnast who was the 1960 Olympic all-around champion and the 1958 all-around World Champion. He won a total of 13 medals including seven gold medals at the Summer Olympics, and was the most successful athlete at the 1960 Summer Olympics. He held the record for most Olympic medals by a male athlete record until gymnast Nikolai Andrianov won his 14th and 15th medals at the 1980 Summer Olympics. He also won 14 medals at the World Championships.

== Career ==
Shakhlin was born in Ishim, Russian SFSR. He began gymnastics at the age of 12. According to the Encyclopædia Britannica, he "set a career record of 10 individual titles in the world championships and also won gold medals at three successive Olympic Games. His tally of seven gold, four silver, and two bronze Olympic medals placed him among the most-decorated at the Games".

Shakhlin retired from competition at the age of 35 after suffering a heart attack. He joined the FIG Men's Technical Committee in 1968 and continued to work on the Committee until 1992. In the 1990s and 2000s (decade), he worked as a lecturer at the University of Kyiv.

He was awarded the Red Banner of Labor in 1956 and the Order of Lenin in 1960. He was named an honorary citizen both in his birth town Ishim and in Kyiv where lived for many years. In 2002, he was inducted into the International Gymnastics Hall of Fame.

He died on 30 May 2008.

== Philatelia ==
The Mongol Post issued a postage stamp - Boris Shakhlin (No.525, 1969).

== See also ==
- List of multiple Olympic gold medalists
- List of multiple Olympic gold medalists at a single Games
- List of multiple Summer Olympic medalists
- List of Olympic medal leaders in men's gymnastics

Records
Preceded by (Italy) Edoardo Mangiarotti	Most career Olympic medals by a man 1964 – 1980	Succeeded by (Soviet Union) Nikolai Andrianov
Preceded by (Japan) Takashi Ono	Most career Olympic medals by a man 1964 – 1980	Succeeded by (Soviet Union) Nikolai Andrianov
