= Gymnastics at the 1960 Summer Olympics – Men's vault =

Olympic gymnastics event

Men's vault at the Games of the XVII Olympiad
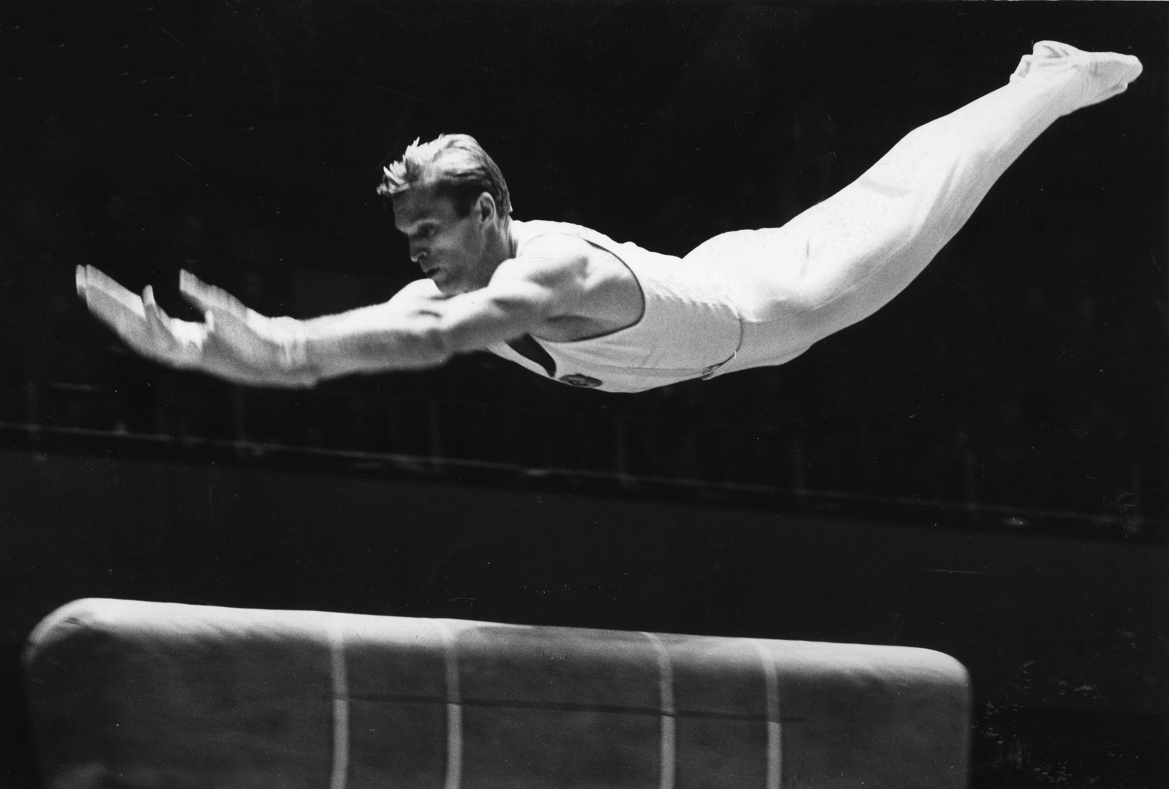
- Boris Shakhlin competing on the vault
- Venue: Baths of Caracalla
- Dates: 5–10 September 1960
- Competitors: 129 from 28 nations
- Winning score: 19.350

Medalists
1st place, gold medalist(s)		Boris Shakhlin	Soviet Union
1st place, gold medalist(s)		Takashi Ono	Japan
3rd place, bronze medalist(s)		Vladimir Portnoi	Soviet Union

The men's vault competition was one of eight events for male competitors in artistic gymnastics at the 1960 Summer Olympics in Rome. It was held on 5, 7, and 10 September at the Baths of Caracalla. There were 129 competitors from 28 nations, with nations in the team competition having up to 6 gymnasts and other nations entering up to 2 gymnasts. For the second straight Games, there was a tie for first place in the vault. Boris Shakhlin of the Soviet Union and Takashi Ono of Japan each received a gold medal. It was the third consecutive Games with a gold medal for the Soviets. Ono, who had taken bronze in 1952, became the second man to win multiple vault medals. Third place and the bronze medal went to Soviet Vladimir Portnoi.

The 1960 gymnastics competitions introduced apparatus finals, with the all-around competition serving as a qualifying round for the vault final.

== Background ==
This was the 10th appearance of the event, which is one of the five apparatus events held every time there were apparatus events at the Summer Olympics (no apparatus events were held in 1900, 1908, 1912, or 1920). Four of the top 10 gymnasts from 1956 returned: bronze medalist Yury Titov of the Soviet Union, fourth-place finisher Boris Shakhlin of the Soviet Union, sixth-place finisher (and 1952 silver medalist) Masao Takemoto of Japan, and seventh-place finisher Jack Beckner of the United States. Also returning was Takashi Ono of Japan, bronze medalist in 1952 and 16th place in 1956. The 1958 World Championship podium was (in order) Titov, Takemoto, and Ono.

Morocco and South Korea each made their debut in the men's vault; the short-lived United Arab Republic made its only appearance. The United States made its ninth appearance, most of any nation, having missed only the inaugural 1896 Games.

== Competition format ==
The gymnastics all-around events continued to use the aggregation format. Each nation entered a team of six gymnasts or up to two individual gymnasts. All entrants in the gymnastics competitions performed both a compulsory exercise and a voluntary exercise for each apparatus. The scores for all 12 exercises were summed to give an individual all-around score. The event used a "vaulting horse" aligned parallel to the gymnast's run (rather than the modern "vaulting table" in use since 2004).

These exercise scores were also used for qualification for the new apparatus finals. The two exercises (compulsory and voluntary) for each apparatus were summed to give an apparatus score; the top 6 in each apparatus participated in the finals; others were ranked 7th through 130th. For the apparatus finals, the all-around score for that apparatus was multiplied by one-half then added to the final round exercise score to give a final total.

Exercise scores ranged from 0 to 10, with the final total apparatus score from 0 to 20.

== Schedule ==
All times are Central European Time (UTC+1)

Date	Time	Round
Monday, 5 September 1960	8:00; 17:00	Preliminary: Compulsory
Wednesday, 7 September 1960	8:00; 17:00	Preliminary: Voluntary
Saturday, 10 September 1960	15:00	Final

== Results ==
Rank	Gymnast	Nation	Preliminary			Final		
Rank	Gymnast	Nation	Compulsory	Voluntary	Total	1/2 Prelim.	Final	Total
1st place, gold medalist(s)	Takashi Ono	Japan	9.60	9.70	19.30	9.650	9.700	19.350
1st place, gold medalist(s)	Boris Shakhlin	Soviet Union	9.50	9.70	19.20	9.600	9.750	19.350
3rd place, bronze medalist(s)	Vladimir Portnoy	Soviet Union	9.60	9.65	19.25	9.625	9.600	19.225
4	Yury Titov	Soviet Union	9.50	9.50	19.00	9.500	9.700	19.200
5	Yukio Endo	Japan	9.55	9.50	19.05	9.525	9.650	19.175
6	Shuji Tsurumi	Japan	9.45	9.55	19.00	9.500	9.650	19.150
7	Masao Takemoto	Japan	9.35	9.65	19.00	did not advance		
8	Takashi Mitsukuri	Japan	9.40	9.55	18.95	did not advance		
9	Nobuyuki Aihara	Japan	9.35	9.50	18.85	did not advance		
9	Franco Menichelli	Italy	9.35	9.50	18.85	did not advance		
9	Giovanni Carminucci	Italy	9.20	9.65	18.85	did not advance		
12	Nikolai Miligulo	Soviet Union	9.30	9.50	18.80	did not advance		
13	Miroslav Cerar	Yugoslavia	9.35	9.40	18.75	did not advance		
14	Albert Azaryan	Soviet Union	9.30	9.40	18.70	did not advance		
15	Angelo Vicardi	Italy	9.30	9.35	18.65	did not advance		
16	Valery Kerdemelidi	Soviet Union	9.25	9.35	18.60	did not advance		
17	Fred Orlofsky	United States	9.20	9.35	18.55	did not advance		
17	Nikola Prodanov	Bulgaria	9.15	9.40	18.55	did not advance		
19	William Thoresson	Sweden	9.20	9.30	18.50	did not advance		
20	Jaroslav Šťastný	Czechoslovakia	9.05	9.40	18.45	did not advance		
20	Josy Stoffel	Luxembourg	9.25	9.20	18.45	did not advance		
20	Ernst Fivian	Switzerland	9.10	9.35	18.45	did not advance		
20	Don Tonry	United States	9.20	9.25	18.45	did not advance		
20	Pavel Gajdoš	Czechoslovakia	9.05	9.40	18.45	did not advance		
20	Bo Wirhed	Sweden	9.25	9.20	18.45	did not advance		
26	Günter Lyhs	United Team of Germany	9.00	9.40	18.40	did not advance		
26	Josef Trmal	Czechoslovakia	9.00	9.40	18.40	did not advance		
28	Ferdinand Daniš	Czechoslovakia	8.95	9.40	18.35	did not advance		
28	Larry Banner	United States	9.05	9.30	18.35	did not advance		
28	Max Benker	Switzerland	9.00	9.35	18.35	did not advance		
28	Stoyan Stoyanov	Bulgaria	9.05	9.30	18.35	did not advance		
28	Sándor Békési	Hungary	9.05	9.30	18.35	did not advance		
33	Günter Nachtigall	United Team of Germany	8.95	9.35	18.30	did not advance		
34	Siegfried Fülle	United Team of Germany	8.90	9.35	18.25	did not advance		
34	Pasquale Carminucci	Italy	8.90	9.35	18.25	did not advance		
34	Lajos Varga	Hungary	9.25	9.00	18.25	did not advance		
34	Rajmund Csányi	Hungary	9.10	9.15	18.25	did not advance		
34	Alojz Petrovič	Yugoslavia	9.00	9.25	18.25	did not advance		
39	Jaroslav Bím	Czechoslovakia	8.85	9.35	18.20	did not advance		
39	Gianfranco Marzolla	Italy	8.95	9.25	18.20	did not advance		
39	Karlheinz Friedrich	United Team of Germany	9.10	9.10	18.20	did not advance		
39	Philipp Fürst	United Team of Germany	8.95	9.25	18.20	did not advance		
43	Olavi Leimuvirta	Finland	8.90	9.25	18.15	did not advance		
43	Fritz Feuz	Switzerland	8.70	9.45	18.15	did not advance		
43	Lyuben Khristov	Bulgaria	8.80	9.35	18.15	did not advance		
46	Otto Kestola	Finland	8.90	9.20	18.10	did not advance		
46	Jack Beckner	United States	8.90	9.20	18.10	did not advance		
46	Hans Schwarzentruber	Switzerland	8.75	9.35	18.10	did not advance		
46	Ivan Čaklec	Yugoslavia	8.80	9.30	18.10	did not advance		
46	Hermenegildo Martínez	Spain	8.85	9.25	18.10	did not advance		
51	Sakari Olkkonen	Finland	8.75	9.30	18.05	did not advance		
52	Orlando Polmonari	Italy	8.75	9.25	18.00	did not advance		
52	Rudolf Keszthelyi	Hungary	8.85	9.15	18.00	did not advance		
52	Bernard Fauqueux	France	8.90	9.10	18.00	did not advance		
52	Ernest Hawełek	Poland	8.85	9.15	18.00	did not advance		
52	Jerzy Jokiel	Poland	8.95	9.05	18.00	did not advance		
52	Georgi Khristov	Bulgaria	9.00	9.00	18.00	did not advance		
58	Velik Kapsazov	Bulgaria	8.60	9.35	17.95	did not advance		
58	Alfred Kucharczyk	Poland	8.55	9.40	17.95	did not advance		
58	Ismail Abdallah	United Arab Republic	8.75	9.20	17.95	did not advance		
61	Gar O'Quinn	United States	8.75	9.15	17.90	did not advance		
61	Milenko Lekić	Yugoslavia	8.65	9.25	17.90	did not advance		
63	Robert Caymaris	France	8.85	9.00	17.85	did not advance		
63	Abie Grossfeld	United States	8.90	8.95	17.85	did not advance		
63	Armand Huberty	Luxembourg	8.75	9.10	17.85	did not advance		
63	Marsel Markulin	Yugoslavia	8.70	9.15	17.85	did not advance		
63	Ahmed Goneim	United Arab Republic	8.85	9.00	17.85	did not advance		
68	Raimo Heinonen	Finland	8.60	9.20	17.80	did not advance		
69	André Brüllmann	Switzerland	8.60	9.15	17.75	did not advance		
69	Géza Bejek	Hungary	8.70	9.05	17.75	did not advance		
69	Leif Koorn	Sweden	8.45	9.30	17.75	did not advance		
69	Willi Kafel	Austria	8.80	8.95	17.75	did not advance		
73	Nik Stuart	Great Britain	8.70	9.00	17.70	did not advance		
73	Józef Rajnisz	Poland	8.75	8.95	17.70	did not advance		
73	Kurt Wigartz	Sweden	8.45	9.25	17.70	did not advance		
73	Hans Sauter	Austria	8.60	9.10	17.70	did not advance		
73	Jean Jaillard	France	8.70	9.00	17.70	did not advance		
73	Richard Montpetit	Canada	8.95	8.75	17.70	did not advance		
73	Enrique Montserrat	Spain	8.75	8.95	17.70	did not advance		
73	Luis Valbuena	Spain	8.85	8.85	17.70	did not advance		
81	Kauko Heikkinen	Finland	8.70	8.95	17.65	did not advance		
81	Erwin Koppe	United Team of Germany	8.45	9.20	17.65	did not advance		
81	Stig Lindewall	Sweden	8.70	8.95	17.65	did not advance		
81	Edy Thomi	Switzerland	8.50	9.15	17.65	did not advance		
81	János Mester	Hungary	8.60	9.05	17.65	did not advance		
81	Kim Sang-guk	South Korea	8.65	9.00	17.65	did not advance		
87	Marcel Coppin	Luxembourg	8.75	8.85	17.60	did not advance		
87	René Marteaux	Belgium	8.50	9.10	17.60	did not advance		
89	Eugen Ekman	Finland	8.55	9.00	17.55	did not advance		
89	Åge Storhaug	Norway	8.40	9.15	17.55	did not advance		
89	Ladislav Pazdera	Czechoslovakia	8.35	9.20	17.55	did not advance		
89	Selim El-Sayed	United Arab Republic	8.70	8.85	17.55	did not advance		
93	Andrzej Konopka	Poland	8.80	8.65	17.45	did not advance		
93	Johann König	Austria	8.55	8.90	17.45	did not advance		
95	Emilio Lecuona	Spain	8.35	9.05	17.40	did not advance		
95	Abdel Vares Sharraf	United Arab Republic	8.40	9.00	17.40	did not advance		
95	Léopold Desmet	Belgium	8.50	8.90	17.40	did not advance		
98	Jack Pancott	Great Britain	8.20	9.15	17.35	did not advance		
98	Ken Buffin	Great Britain	8.30	9.05	17.35	did not advance		
100	Dragan Gagić	Yugoslavia	7.95	9.25	17.20	did not advance		
101	Mohamed Lazhari	France	8.10	9.05	17.15	did not advance		
102	Gerhard Huber	Austria	8.40	8.70	17.10	did not advance		
102	Hubert Erang	Luxembourg	8.40	8.70	17.10	did not advance		
104	John Mulhall	Great Britain	8.45	8.60	17.05	did not advance		
105	Peter Starling	Great Britain	7.85	9.15	17.00	did not advance		
106	Todor Bachvarov	Bulgaria	7.85	9.05	16.90	did not advance		
106	Hermann Klien	Austria	8.40	8.50	16.90	did not advance		
108	Ahmed Dakkeli	United Arab Republic	7.75	9.10	16.85	did not advance		
109	Miloud M'Sellek	Morocco	8.30	8.50	16.80	did not advance		
110	Michel Mathiot	France	7.65	9.10	16.75	did not advance		
111	Michel Kiesgen	Luxembourg	7.80	8.85	16.65	did not advance		
112	Aleksander Rokosa	Poland	7.65	8.90	16.55	did not advance		
113	Anton Hertl	Austria	7.55	8.95	16.50	did not advance		
114	Jaime Belenguer	Spain	7.65	8.80	16.45	did not advance		
115	Ramón García	Spain	7.50	8.90	16.40	did not advance		
116	Benjamin de Roo	Australia	7.40	8.95	16.35	did not advance		
117	Ahmed Issam Allam	United Arab Republic	7.00	9.30	16.30	did not advance		
117	Juan Caviglia	Argentina	7.40	8.90	16.30	did not advance		
119	François Eisenbarth	Luxembourg	7.75	8.45	16.20	did not advance		
120	Ahmed Fellat	Morocco	8.30	7.35	15.65	did not advance		
121	Armando Valles	Mexico	7.15	8.40	15.55	did not advance		
122	Daniel Touche	France	6.00	9.10	15.10	did not advance		
123	Dick Gradley	Great Britain	8.30	6.75	15.05	did not advance		
123	Jean Cronstedt	Sweden	6.10	8.95	15.05	did not advance		
125	Graham Bond	Australia	6.00	8.65	14.65	did not advance		
126	Mohamed Sekkat	Morocco	6.50	7.95	14.45	did not advance		
127	Abdesselem Regragui	Morocco	6.00	6.75	12.75	did not advance		
128	Darif Tanjaoui	Morocco	6.00	5.50	11.50	did not advance		
129	Hermenegildo Candeias	Portugal	0.00	8.75	8.75	did not advance		
—	Kacem Klifa	Morocco	DNS			did not advance		
