= Gymnastics at the 1960 Summer Olympics – Men's rings =

Olympic gymnastics event

Men's rings at the Games of the XVII Olympiad
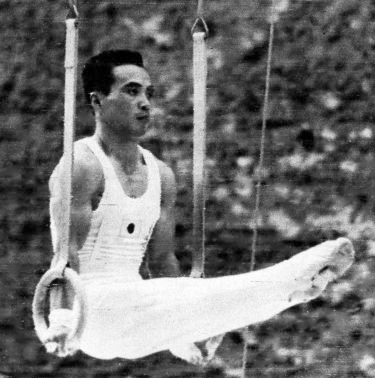
- Noboyuki Aihara competing on the rings
- Venue: Baths of Caracalla
- Dates: 5–10 September 1960
- Competitors: 129 from 28 nations
- Winning score: 19.725

Medalists
| 1st place, gold medalist(s) | | Albert Azaryan; Soviet Union |
| 2nd place, silver medalist(s) | | Boris Shakhlin; Soviet Union |
| 3rd place, bronze medalist(s) | | Takashi Ono; Japan |
| 3rd place, bronze medalist(s) | | Velik Kapsazov; Bulgaria |

The men's rings competition was one of eight events for male competitors in artistic gymnastics at the 1960 Summer Olympics in Rome. It was held on 5, 7, and 10 September at the Baths of Caracalla. There were 129 competitors from 28 nations, with nations in the team competition having up to 6 gymnasts and other nations entering up to 2 gymnasts. The event was won by Albert Azaryan of the Soviet Union, the first man to successfully defend an Olympic title in the rings. Boris Shakhlin took silver, making it the third consecutive Games the Soviets finished in the top two. Takashi Ono tied with Velik Kapsazov for bronze, giving Japan its second consecutive Games with at least one bronze medal (there had been a tie for third in 1956 as well, between two Japanese gymnasts that time) and Bulgaria its first medal in the rings.

The 1960 gymnastics competitions introduced apparatus finals, with the all-around competition serving as a qualifying round for the rings final.

== Background ==
This was the 10th appearance of the event, which is one of the five apparatus events held every time there were apparatus events at the Summer Olympics (no apparatus events were held in 1900, 1908, 1912, or 1920). Six of the top 11 (including ties for 10th) gymnasts from 1956 returned: gold medalist Albert Azaryan and tenth-place finisher Yury Titov of the Soviet Union, bronze medalist Masao Takemoto and fifth-place finishers Takashi Ono and Nobuyuki Aihara of Japan, and ninth-place finisher Ferdinand Daniš of Czechoslovakia. Azaryan, Aihara, and Titov had comprised the podium in the 1958 world championships.

Morocco and South Korea each made their debut in the men's rings; the short-lived United Arab Republic made its only appearance. The United States made its ninth appearance, most of any nation, having missed only the inaugural 1896 Games.

== Competition format ==
The gymnastics all-around events continued to use the aggregation format. Each nation entered a team of six gymnasts or up to two individual gymnasts. All entrants in the gymnastics competitions performed both a compulsory exercise and a voluntary exercise for each apparatus. The scores for all 12 exercises were summed to give an individual all-around score.

These exercise scores were also used for qualification for the new apparatus finals. The two exercises (compulsory and voluntary) for each apparatus were summed to give an apparatus score; the top 6 in each apparatus participated in the finals; others were ranked 7th through 129th. For the apparatus finals, the all-around score for that apparatus was multiplied by one-half then added to the final round exercise score to give a final total.

Exercise scores ranged from 0 to 10, with the final total apparatus score from 0 to 20.

== Schedule ==
All times are Central European Time (UTC+1)

| Date | Time | Round |
|---|---|---|
| Monday, 5 September 1960 | 8:00; 17:00 | Preliminary: Compulsory |
| Wednesday, 7 September 1960 | 8:00; 17:00 | Preliminary: Voluntary |
| Saturday, 10 September 1960 | 15:00 | Final |

== Results ==
| Rank | Gymnast | Nation | Preliminary | | | Final | | |
| Rank | Gymnast | Nation | Compulsory | Voluntary | Total | 1/2 Prelim. | Final | Total |
|---|---|---|---|---|---|---|---|---|
| 1st place, gold medalist(s) | Albert Azaryan | Soviet Union | 9.85 | 9.90 | 19.75 | 9.875 | 9.850 | 19.725 |
| 2nd place, silver medalist(s) | Boris Shakhlin | Soviet Union | 9.70 | 9.80 | 19.50 | 9.750 | 9.750 | 19.500 |
| 3rd place, bronze medalist(s) | Velik Kapsazov | Bulgaria | 9.65 | 9.70 | 19.35 | 9.675 | 9.750 | 19.425 |
| 3rd place, bronze medalist(s) | Takashi Ono | Japan | 9.75 | 9.70 | 19.45 | 9.725 | 9.700 | 19.425 |
| 5 | Nobuyuki Aihara | Japan | 9.65 | 9.75 | 19.40 | 9.700 | 9.700 | 19.400 |
| 6 | Yury Titov | Soviet Union | 9.70 | 9.75 | 19.45 | 9.725 | 9.550 | 19.275 |
| 7 | Franco Menichelli | Italy | 9.55 | 9.75 | 19.30 | did not advance | | |
| 8 | Masao Takemoto | Japan | 9.60 | 9.65 | 19.25 | did not advance | | |
| 9 | Shuji Tsurumi | Japan | 9.60 | 9.60 | 19.20 | did not advance | | |
| 9 | Valery Kerdemelidi | Soviet Union | 9.60 | 9.60 | 19.20 | did not advance | | |
| 11 | Miroslav Cerar | Yugoslavia | 9.45 | 9.60 | 19.05 | did not advance | | |
| 12 | Takashi Mitsukuri | Japan | 9.50 | 9.50 | 19.00 | did not advance | | |
| 12 | Yukio Endo | Japan | 9.60 | 9.40 | 19.00 | did not advance | | |
| 12 | Nikolai Miligulo | Soviet Union | 9.50 | 9.50 | 19.00 | did not advance | | |
| 12 | Vladimir Portnoy | Soviet Union | 9.45 | 9.55 | 19.00 | did not advance | | |
| 16 | Josef Trmal | Czechoslovakia | 9.55 | 9.40 | 18.95 | did not advance | | |
| 16 | Philipp Fürst | United Team of Germany | 9.50 | 9.45 | 18.95 | did not advance | | |
| 16 | Erwin Koppe | United Team of Germany | 9.45 | 9.50 | 18.95 | did not advance | | |
| 19 | Otto Kestola | Finland | 9.40 | 9.50 | 18.90 | did not advance | | |
| 20 | Leif Koorn | Sweden | 9.50 | 9.35 | 18.85 | did not advance | | |
| 21 | Larry Banner | United States | 9.50 | 9.30 | 18.80 | did not advance | | |
| 21 | Pasquale Carminucci | Italy | 9.35 | 9.45 | 18.80 | did not advance | | |
| 21 | Ferdinand Daniš | Czechoslovakia | 9.30 | 9.50 | 18.80 | did not advance | | |
| 21 | Siegfried Fülle | United Team of Germany | 9.40 | 9.40 | 18.80 | did not advance | | |
| 25 | Nik Stuart | Great Britain | 9.35 | 9.40 | 18.75 | did not advance | | |
| 25 | Lajos Varga | Hungary | 9.40 | 9.35 | 18.75 | did not advance | | |
| 25 | Abie Grossfeld | United States | 9.35 | 9.40 | 18.75 | did not advance | | |
| 25 | Georgi Khristov | Bulgaria | 9.40 | 9.35 | 18.75 | did not advance | | |
| 25 | Stoyan Stoyanov | Bulgaria | 9.25 | 9.50 | 18.75 | did not advance | | |
| 30 | Gianfranco Marzolla | Italy | 9.15 | 9.55 | 18.70 | did not advance | | |
| 30 | Józef Rajnisz | Poland | 9.35 | 9.35 | 18.70 | did not advance | | |
| 30 | Rajmund Csányi | Hungary | 9.25 | 9.45 | 18.70 | did not advance | | |
| 30 | Abdel Vares Sharraf | United Arab Republic | 9.40 | 9.30 | 18.70 | did not advance | | |
| 34 | Sakari Olkkonen | Finland | 9.20 | 9.45 | 18.65 | did not advance | | |
| 34 | Stig Lindewall | Sweden | 9.35 | 9.30 | 18.65 | did not advance | | |
| 36 | Jaroslav Bím | Czechoslovakia | 9.30 | 9.30 | 18.60 | did not advance | | |
| 36 | Fred Orlofsky | United States | 9.45 | 9.15 | 18.60 | did not advance | | |
| 36 | Aleksander Rokosa | Poland | 9.45 | 9.15 | 18.60 | did not advance | | |
| 39 | Josy Stoffel | Luxembourg | 9.15 | 9.40 | 18.55 | did not advance | | |
| 39 | Günter Nachtigall | United Team of Germany | 9.35 | 9.20 | 18.55 | did not advance | | |
| 39 | Alojz Petrovič | Yugoslavia | 9.20 | 9.35 | 18.55 | did not advance | | |
| 39 | Günter Lyhs | United Team of Germany | 9.40 | 9.15 | 18.55 | did not advance | | |
| 43 | Hans Schwarzentruber | Switzerland | 9.10 | 9.35 | 18.45 | did not advance | | |
| 43 | Andrzej Konopka | Poland | 9.25 | 9.20 | 18.45 | did not advance | | |
| 43 | Rudolf Keszthelyi | Hungary | 9.25 | 9.20 | 18.45 | did not advance | | |
| 46 | Giovanni Carminucci | Italy | 8.90 | 9.50 | 18.40 | did not advance | | |
| 46 | Ladislav Pazdera | Czechoslovakia | 9.10 | 9.30 | 18.40 | did not advance | | |
| 46 | Kim Sang-guk | South Korea | 9.15 | 9.25 | 18.40 | did not advance | | |
| 49 | Todor Bachvarov | Bulgaria | 9.25 | 9.10 | 18.35 | did not advance | | |
| 49 | Bernard Fauqueux | France | 9.15 | 9.20 | 18.35 | did not advance | | |
| 49 | Karlheinz Friedrich | United Team of Germany | 9.05 | 9.30 | 18.35 | did not advance | | |
| 52 | Orlando Polmonari | Italy | 9.00 | 9.30 | 18.30 | did not advance | | |
| 52 | Pavel Gajdoš | Czechoslovakia | 8.90 | 9.40 | 18.30 | did not advance | | |
| 52 | Olavi Leimuvirta | Finland | 9.25 | 9.05 | 18.30 | did not advance | | |
| 55 | Jack Beckner | United States | 9.10 | 9.15 | 18.25 | did not advance | | |
| 55 | Ernest Hawełek | Poland | 9.20 | 9.05 | 18.25 | did not advance | | |
| 55 | Emilio Lecuona | Spain | 9.05 | 9.20 | 18.25 | did not advance | | |
| 55 | Ahmed Dakkeli | United Arab Republic | 9.15 | 9.10 | 18.25 | did not advance | | |
| 59 | Åge Storhaug | Norway | 8.95 | 9.25 | 18.20 | did not advance | | |
| 59 | Angelo Vicardi | Italy | 8.80 | 9.40 | 18.20 | did not advance | | |
| 59 | Don Tonry | United States | 9.20 | 9.00 | 18.20 | did not advance | | |
| 59 | Fritz Feuz | Switzerland | 9.00 | 9.20 | 18.20 | did not advance | | |
| 59 | Lyuben Khristov | Bulgaria | 9.20 | 9.00 | 18.20 | did not advance | | |
| 59 | Marsel Markulin | Yugoslavia | 9.10 | 9.10 | 18.20 | did not advance | | |
| 59 | Ismail Abdallah | United Arab Republic | 9.10 | 9.10 | 18.20 | did not advance | | |
| 66 | Eugen Ekman | Finland | 8.90 | 9.25 | 18.15 | did not advance | | |
| 66 | Nikola Prodanov | Bulgaria | 9.20 | 8.95 | 18.15 | did not advance | | |
| 66 | Michel Kiesgen | Luxembourg | 8.90 | 9.25 | 18.15 | did not advance | | |
| 69 | Raimo Heinonen | Finland | 9.05 | 9.05 | 18.10 | did not advance | | |
| 69 | Armand Huberty | Luxembourg | 8.95 | 9.15 | 18.10 | did not advance | | |
| 71 | Max Benker | Switzerland | 8.75 | 9.30 | 18.05 | did not advance | | |
| 71 | Milenko Lekić | Yugoslavia | 9.10 | 8.95 | 18.05 | did not advance | | |
| 73 | Ernst Fivian | Switzerland | 8.65 | 9.35 | 18.00 | did not advance | | |
| 73 | André Brüllmann | Switzerland | 9.20 | 8.80 | 18.00 | did not advance | | |
| 73 | Jerzy Jokiel | Poland | 8.95 | 9.05 | 18.00 | did not advance | | |
| 73 | Luis Valbuena | Spain | 8.70 | 9.30 | 18.00 | did not advance | | |
| 77 | Jaroslav Šťastný | Czechoslovakia | 8.80 | 9.15 | 17.95 | did not advance | | |
| 77 | Bo Wirhed | Sweden | 8.90 | 9.05 | 17.95 | did not advance | | |
| 79 | Kauko Heikkinen | Finland | 9.15 | 8.75 | 17.90 | did not advance | | |
| 79 | Dragan Gagić | Yugoslavia | 8.65 | 9.25 | 17.90 | did not advance | | |
| 79 | Hans Sauter | Austria | 8.95 | 8.95 | 17.90 | did not advance | | |
| 79 | Enrique Montserrat | Spain | 8.80 | 9.10 | 17.90 | did not advance | | |
| 83 | Daniel Touche | France | 8.90 | 8.95 | 17.85 | did not advance | | |
| 83 | Dick Gradley | Great Britain | 8.65 | 9.20 | 17.85 | did not advance | | |
| 85 | Ahmed Goneim | United Arab Republic | 8.60 | 9.20 | 17.80 | did not advance | | |
| 85 | Ramón García | Spain | 8.75 | 9.05 | 17.80 | did not advance | | |
| 87 | Jean Cronstedt | Sweden | 8.85 | 8.80 | 17.65 | did not advance | | |
| 88 | Gar O'Quinn | United States | 9.40 | 8.20 | 17.60 | did not advance | | |
| 88 | Alfred Kucharczyk | Poland | 9.10 | 8.50 | 17.60 | did not advance | | |
| 88 | Géza Bejek | Hungary | 8.85 | 8.75 | 17.60 | did not advance | | |
| 91 | Sándor Békési | Hungary | 8.75 | 8.75 | 17.50 | did not advance | | |
| 92 | Kurt Wigartz | Sweden | 8.60 | 8.85 | 17.45 | did not advance | | |
| 92 | Mohamed Lazhari | France | 8.55 | 8.90 | 17.45 | did not advance | | |
| 94 | Ivan Čaklec | Yugoslavia | 8.40 | 8.95 | 17.35 | did not advance | | |
| 95 | Jaime Belenguer | Spain | 9.10 | 8.20 | 17.30 | did not advance | | |
| 95 | Robert Caymaris | France | 8.10 | 9.20 | 17.30 | did not advance | | |
| 95 | Jack Pancott | Great Britain | 8.50 | 8.80 | 17.30 | did not advance | | |
| 98 | Richard Montpetit | Canada | 8.90 | 8.35 | 17.25 | did not advance | | |
| 98 | René Marteaux | Belgium | 8.65 | 8.60 | 17.25 | did not advance | | |
| 100 | Johann König | Austria | 8.60 | 8.60 | 17.20 | did not advance | | |
| 101 | Gerhard Huber | Austria | 8.35 | 8.80 | 17.15 | did not advance | | |
| 102 | János Mester | Hungary | 8.15 | 8.95 | 17.10 | did not advance | | |
| 102 | Graham Bond | Australia | 8.60 | 8.50 | 17.10 | did not advance | | |
| 104 | Léopold Desmet | Belgium | 8.30 | 8.65 | 16.95 | did not advance | | |
| 105 | Edy Thomi | Switzerland | 8.15 | 8.75 | 16.90 | did not advance | | |
| 106 | Benjamin de Roo | Australia | 8.40 | 8.45 | 16.85 | did not advance | | |
| 107 | Hermann Klien | Austria | 8.05 | 8.75 | 16.80 | did not advance | | |
| 107 | William Thoresson | Sweden | 8.25 | 8.55 | 16.80 | did not advance | | |
| 107 | Armando Valles | Mexico | 8.55 | 8.25 | 16.80 | did not advance | | |
| 110 | Ahmed Issam Allam | United Arab Republic | 8.75 | 8.00 | 16.75 | did not advance | | |
| 111 | Willi Kafel | Austria | 8.20 | 8.50 | 16.70 | did not advance | | |
| 111 | Marcel Coppin | Luxembourg | 8.05 | 8.65 | 16.70 | did not advance | | |
| 113 | Jean Jaillard | France | 8.00 | 8.65 | 16.65 | did not advance | | |
| 113 | John Mulhall | Great Britain | 8.15 | 8.50 | 16.65 | did not advance | | |
| 115 | Michel Mathiot | France | 7.85 | 8.70 | 16.55 | did not advance | | |
| 116 | Hermenegildo Candeias | Portugal | 7.95 | 8.25 | 16.20 | did not advance | | |
| 117 | Selim El-Sayed | United Arab Republic | 8.55 | 7.60 | 16.15 | did not advance | | |
| 118 | Ken Buffin | Great Britain | 7.75 | 8.00 | 15.75 | did not advance | | |
| 119 | Juan Caviglia | Argentina | 7.20 | 8.20 | 15.40 | did not advance | | |
| 120 | François Eisenbarth | Luxembourg | 7.45 | 7.80 | 15.25 | did not advance | | |
| 121 | Hubert Erang | Luxembourg | 6.75 | 8.00 | 14.75 | did not advance | | |
| 122 | Mohamed Sekkat | Morocco | 6.10 | 7.25 | 13.35 | did not advance | | |
| 123 | Miloud M'Sellek | Morocco | 5.80 | 6.40 | 12.20 | did not advance | | |
| 124 | Hermenegildo Martínez | Spain | 0.00 | 9.35 | 9.35 | did not advance | | |
| 125 | Ahmed Fellat | Morocco | 4.00 | 4.75 | 8.75 | did not advance | | |
| 126 | Peter Starling | Great Britain | 8.50 | — | 8.50 | did not advance | | |
| 127 | Darif Tanjaoui | Morocco | 4.20 | 4.00 | 8.20 | did not advance | | |
| 128 | Abdesselem Regragui | Morocco | 3.50 | 4.00 | 7.50 | did not advance | | |
| 128 | Anton Hertl | Austria | 7.50 | — | 7.50 | did not advance | | |
