= European Artistic Gymnastics Championships – Men's floor =

Men's floor has been staged at every European Men's Artistic Gymnastics Championships since 1955.

== Medalists ==
| Year | Location | Gold | Silver | Bronze |
|---|---|---|---|---|
| 1955 | (West Germany) Frankfurt | Vladimir Prorok (TCH) | Jan Cronstedt (SWE) | Adalbert Dickhut (FRG) |
| 1957 | (France) Paris | William Thoresson (SWE) | Nik Stuart (GBR) | Herbert Schmitt (FRG) |
| 1959 | (Denmark) Copenhagen | Ernst Fivian (SUI) | William Thoresson (SWE) | Yuri Titov (URS) |
| 1961 | Luxembourg | Franco Menichelli (ITA) | Viktor Leontyev (URS) | Miroslav Cerar (YUG) |
| 1963 | (Socialist Federal Republic of Yugoslavia) Belgrade | Franco Menichelli (ITA) | Vladimir Kerdemilidi (URS) | Miroslav Cerar (YUG) |
| 1965 | (Belgium) Antwerp | Franco Menichelli (ITA) | Miroslav Cerar (YUG) | Viktor Lisitsky (URS) |
| 1967 | (Finland) Tampere | Olli Laiho (FIN) | Franco Menichelli (ITA) | Nikolai Kubica (POL) |
| 1969 | (Poland) Varsovie | Raycho Khristov (BUL) | Viktor Lisitsky (URS) | Sylveszter Kubica (POL) |
| 1971 | (Spain) Madrid | Raycho Khristov (BUL) | José Ginés (ESP) | Nikolai Andrianov (URS) |
| 1973 | (France) Grenoble | Nikolai Andrianov (URS) | Viktor Klimenko (URS) | Klaus Köste (GDR) |
| 1975 | (Switzerland) Bern | Nikolai Andrianov (URS); Andrzej Szajna (POL) | none awarded | Jiří Tabák (TCH) |
| 1977 | (Soviet Union) Vilna | Aleksandr Tkachyov (URS) | Vladimir Markelov (URS) | Vladimir Tikhonov (URS) |
| 1979 | (West Germany) Essen | Stoyan Deltchev (BUL) | Ralph Barthel (GDR) | Lutz Mack (GDR) |
| 1981 | (Italy) Rome | Yuri Korolyov (URS); Roland Brückner (GDR) | none awarded | Aleksandr Tkachyov (URS) |
| 1983 | (Bulgaria) Varna | Plamen Petkov (BUL); Yuri Korolyov (URS) | none awarded | Philippe Vatuone (FRA); Jens Fischer (GDR); György Guczoghy (HUN) |
| 1985 | (Norway) Oslo | Dmitry Bilozerchev (URS) | Philippe Vatuone (FRA) | Laurent Barbiéri (FRA) |
| 1987 | (Soviet Union) Moscow | Valeri Liukin (URS) | Yuri Korolyov (URS) | György Guczoghy (HUN) |
| 1989 | (Sweden) Stockholm | Ihor Korobchynskyi (URS) | Cristian Brezeanu (ROM) | Holger Behrendt (GDR) |
| 1990 | (Switzerland) Lausanne | Vitaly Scherbo (URS) | Sergey Kharkov (URS) | Adrian Gal (ROM) |
| 1992 | (Hungary) Budapest | Ihor Korobchynskyi (UKR) | Vitaly Scherbo (BLR) | Ralf Büchner (GER) |
| 1994 | (Czech Republic) Prague | Ivan Ivanov (BUL) | Dmitri Vasilenko (RUS) | Ivan Ivankov (BLR) |
| 1996 | (Denmark) Broendby | Vitaly Scherbo (BLR) | Yevgeni Podgorny (RUS) | Hrihoriy Misyutin (UKR) |
| 1998 | (Russia) Saint Petersburg | Alexei Nemov (RUS) | Ioannis Melissanidis (GRE) | Alexei Bondarenko (RUS) |
| 2000 | (Germany) Bremen | Marian Drăgulescu (ROU) | Gervasio Deferr (ESP) | Alexei Bondarenko (RUS) |
| 2002 | (Greece) Patras | Alexei Nemov (RUS) | Yordan Yovchev (BUL) | Marian Drăgulescu (ROU) |
| 2004 | (Slovenia) Ljubljana | Marian Drăgulescu (ROU) | Yordan Yovchev (BUL) | Rafael Martínez (ESP) |
| 2005 | (Hungary) Debrecen | Marian Drăgulescu (ROU) | Răzvan Șelariu (ROU) | Róbert Gál (HUN) |
| 2006 | (Greece) Volos | Anton Golotsutskov (RUS) | Marian Drăgulescu (ROU) | Martin Konečný (CZE) |
| 2007 | (Netherlands) Amsterdam | Rafael Martínez (ESP) | Thomas Bouhail (FRA) | Matthias Fahrig (GER); Eleftherios Kosmidis (GRE) |
| 2008 | (Switzerland) Lausanne | Anton Golotsutskov (RUS) | Răzvan Șelariu (ROU) | Fabian Hambüchen (GER) |
| 2009 | (Italy) Milan | Fabian Hambüchen (GER) | Matthias Fahrig (GER) | Eleftherios Kosmidis (GRE); Alexander Shatilov (ISR) |
| 2010 | (United Kingdom) Birmingham | Matthias Fahrig (GER) | Eleftherios Kosmidis (GRE) | Daniel Purvis (GBR); Marcel Nguyen (GER) |
| 2011 | (Germany) Berlin | Flavius Koczi (ROU) | Alexander Shatilov (ISR) | Anton Golotsutskov (RUS) |
| 2012 | (France) Montpellier | Eleftherios Kosmidis (GRE) | Dzmitry Barkalau (BLR) | Gaël Da Silva (FRA); Alexander Shatilov (ISR) |
| 2013 | (Russia) Moscow | Max Whitlock (GBR); Alexander Shatilov (ISR) | none awarded | Andrea Cingolani (ITA) |
| 2014 | (Bulgaria) Sofia | Denis Ablyazin (RUS) | Eleftherios Kosmidis (GRE) | Daniel Purvis (GBR); Alexander Shatilov (ISR) |
| 2015 | (France) Montpellier | Kristian Thomas (GBR) | David Belyavskiy (RUS) | Pablo Brägger (SUI) |
| 2016 | (Switzerland) Bern | Nikita Nagornyy (RUS) | Marian Drăgulescu (ROU) | Alexander Shatilov (ISR) |
| 2017 | (Romania) Cluj-Napoca | Marian Drăgulescu (ROU) | Dmitriy Lankin (RUS) | Alexander Shatilov (ISR) |
| 2018 | (United Kingdom) Glasgow | Dominick Cunningham (GBR) | Artem Dolgopyat (ISR) | Artur Dalaloyan (RUS) |
| 2019 | (Poland) Szczecin | Artur Dalaloyan (RUS) | Artem Dolgopyat (ISR) | Dmitriy Lankin (RUS) |
| 2020 | (Turkey) Mersin | Artem Dolgopyat (ISR) | Aurel Benović (CRO) | Yahor Sharamkou (BLR) |
| 2021 | (Switzerland) Basel | Nikita Nagornyy (RUS) | Benjamin Gischard (SUI) | Nicola Bartolini (ITA) |
| 2022 | (Germany) Munich | Artem Dolgopyat (ISR) | Krisztofer Mészáros (HUN) | Jake Jarman (GBR) |
| 2023 | (Turkey) Antalya | Luke Whitehouse (GBR) | Artem Dolgopyat (ISR) | Milan Hosseini (GER) |
| 2024 | (Italy) Rimini | Luke Whitehouse (GBR) | Artem Dolgopyat (ISR) | Krisztofer Mészáros (HUN) |
| 2025 | (Germany) Leipzig | Luke Whitehouse (GBR) | Harry Hepworth (GBR) | Lorenzo Minh Casali (ITA) |
| 2026 | (Croatia) Zagreb | Artem Dolgopyat (ISR) | Arsenii Dukhno | Harry Hepworth (GBR) |

== Medal table ==
| Rank | Nation | Gold | Silver | Bronze | Total |
|---|---|---|---|---|---|
| 1 | Soviet Union | 9 | 7 | 5 | 21 |
| 2 | Russia (RUS) | 8 | 4 | 5 | 17 |
| 3 | Great Britain (GBR) | 6 | 2 | 4 | 12 |
| 4 | Romania (ROU) | 5 | 5 | 2 | 12 |
| 5 | Bulgaria (BUL) | 5 | 2 | 0 | 7 |
| 6 | Israel (ISR) | 4 | 5 | 5 | 14 |
| 7 | Italy (ITA) | 3 | 1 | 3 | 7 |
| 8 | Germany (GER) | 2 | 1 | 5 | 8 |
| 9 | Greece (GRE) | 1 | 3 | 2 | 6 |
| 10 | Belarus (BLR) | 1 | 2 | 2 | 5 |
| 11 | Spain (ESP) | 1 | 2 | 1 | 4 |
| 12 | Sweden (SWE) | 1 | 2 | 0 | 3 |
| 13 | East Germany | 1 | 1 | 3 | 5 |
| 14 | Switzerland (SUI) | 1 | 1 | 1 | 3 |
| 15 | Poland (POL) | 1 | 0 | 2 | 3 |
| 16 | Czechoslovakia | 1 | 0 | 1 | 2 |
| 16 | Ukraine (UKR) | 1 | 0 | 1 | 2 |
| 18 | Finland (FIN) | 1 | 0 | 0 | 1 |
| 19 | France (FRA) | 0 | 2 | 3 | 5 |
| 20 | Hungary (HUN) | 0 | 1 | 3 | 4 |
| 21 | Yugoslavia | 0 | 1 | 2 | 3 |
| 22 | Croatia (CRO) | 0 | 1 | 0 | 1 |
| 23 | West Germany | 0 | 0 | 2 | 2 |
| 24 | Czech Republic (CZE) | 0 | 0 | 1 | 1 |
| Totals (24 entries) | | 52 | 43 | 53 | 148 |

Notes

- Does not include silver medal won in 2026 won by World Gymnastics 2, the designation under which Russian gymnasts were allowed to compete at those championships.
