= Friedrich (surname) =

Friedrich or Friedrichs is a German surname. Notable people with the surname include:

== Friedrich ==
- Ariane Friedrich (born 1984), German high jumper
- Arne Friedrich (born 1979), German football player
- Bruce Friedrich (born 1969), United States campaigner for the ethical treatment of animals
- Carl Joachim Friedrich (1901–1984), German-American political scientist and academic
- Christian Friedrich (baseball) (born 1987), American baseball player
- Gerhard Friedrich (1917–1945), German fighter pilot
- Holger Friedrich (born 1966), German publisher
- Johann Friedrich (1836–1917), German theologian
- Johannes Friedrich ( (1893–1972), German linguist (hittitologist)
- Johannes Friedrich (1948–2025), German Lutheran theologian and bishop
- John Friedrich (fraudster) (1950–1991), Australian conman
- Jörg Friedrich (born 1944), independent historian and writer
- Jörg Friedrich (born 1959), German rower
- Josef Friedrich (1893–?), Austro-Hungarian flying ace
- Karlheinz Friedrich (born 1934), German artistic gymnast
- Manuel Friedrich (born 1979), German football player
- Paul Friedrich (linguist) (1927–2016), American anthropologist, linguist, poet, and academic
- Paul Leopold Friedrich (1864–1916), German surgeon and bacteriologist
- Wolf Matthias Friedrich (born 1957), German classical singer

=== Politics ===
- Dwight Friedrich (1913–1993), American politician and businessman
- Hans Friedrich (1917–1998), German politician
- Hans-Peter Friedrich (born 1957), German politician, MP
- Ingo Friedrich (born 1942), German politician, MEP
- István Friedrich (1883–1951), Hungarian politician
- Rudolf Friedrich (1923–2013), Swiss politician and lawyer

=== Artistry ===
- Caspar David Friedrich (1774–1840), German Romantic painter
- Gary Friedrich (1943–2018), United States comic book writer
- Mike Friedrich (born 1949), United States comic book writer
- Paul Friedrich (comic artist), American comic artist

== Friedrichs ==
- Fritz Walter Paul Friedrichs (1882–1958), also published under the name Fritz Friedrichs, German chemist, and inventor of the Friedrichs condenser
- Hanns Joachim Friedrichs (1927–1995), German journalist
- Kurt Otto Friedrichs (1901–1983), American mathematician
- Paul Friedrichs (1940–2012), East German motocross and enduro racer
- Paul A. Friedrichs, United States Air Force retired major general
- Rebecca Friedrichs, lead plaintiff in Friedrichs v. California Teachers Association, a 2016 U.S. Supreme Court case

== See also ==
- Fredericks (surname)
- Frederick (given name)
- Friedreich
- Friz
- Friedrichs v. California Teachers Ass'n
