= Trmal =

Trmal (feminine: Trmalová) is a Czech surname. Notable people with the surname include:

- Josef Trmal (born 1932), Czech gymnast
- Matouš Trmal (born 1998), Czech footballer
