= Kalevi Suoniemi =

Finnish artistic gymnast

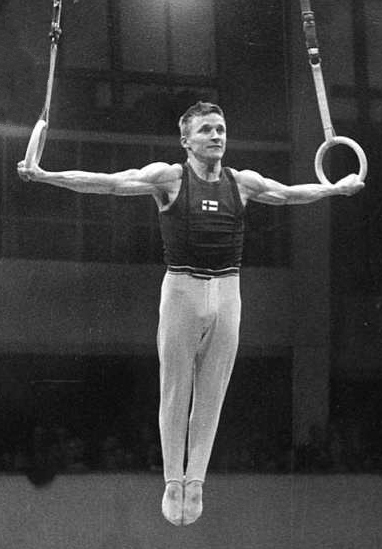
- circa 1956–1960

Personal information
- Full name: Kalevi Ensio Suoniemi
- Born: 14 July 1931 Tampere, Finland
- Died: 17 June 2010 (aged 78) Tampere, Finland
- Height: 164 cm (5 ft 5 in)

Gymnastics career
- Discipline: Men's artistic gymnastics
- Country represented: Finland
Medal record
Representing Finland
Olympic Games
Bronze medal – third place	1956 Melbourne	Team
European championships
Bronze medal – third place	1957 Paris	Rings

Kalevi Ensio Suoniemi (14 July 1931 – 17 June 2010) was a Finnish gymnast. He competed at the 1956 Summer Olympics in all artistic gymnastics events and won a team bronze medal. His best individual result was ninth place on the pommel horse. Suoniemi won an individual bronze medal on the rings at the 1957 European Championships.

Suoniemi was born two months early because his mother had a bad fall while cleaning the floor. He survived owing to the help of his grandmother, who was a nurse and was nearby. He took up gymnastics in 1946 and had his first international competition in 1950. He married in 1953 and had a son, Ari, born in 1954, and a daughter, Sirpa, born in 1958. He retired from competitions in the early 1960s and in 1964–68 worked as a gymnastics coach. His trainees included Hannu Rantakari, who won an individual Olympic bronze medal in 1964. Later, he worked in the construction of electrical facilities. He was also active in local politics and took various posts at the Tampere City Council in 1960–1972 and 2000–2004.
