= Joaquín Blume =

Spanish gymnast (1933–1959)

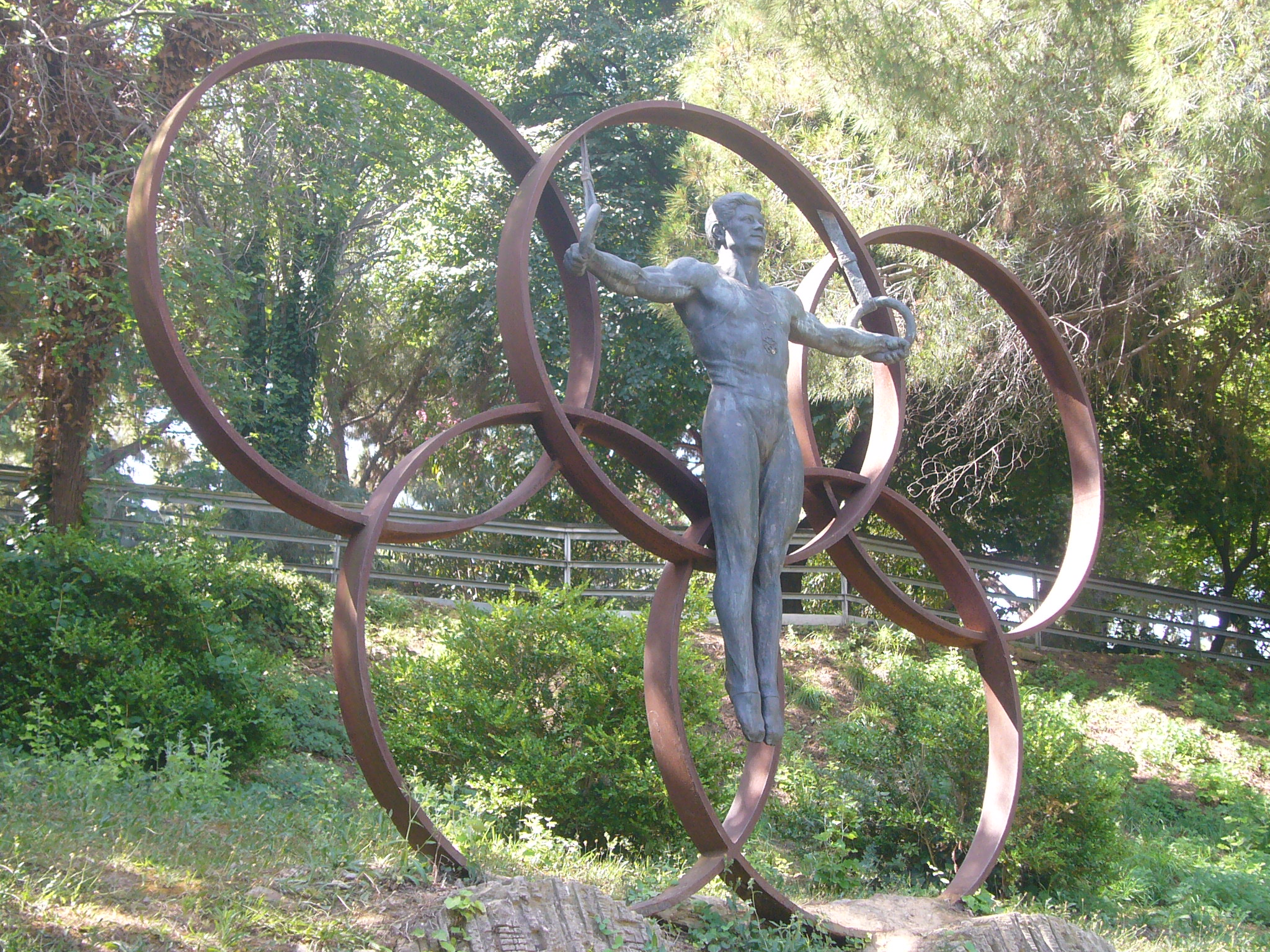

Personal information
- Born: 21 June 1933 Barcelona, Spain
- Died: 29 April 1959 (aged 25) Cuenca, Spain

Gymnastics career
- Discipline: Men's artistic gymnastics
- Country represented: Spain
Medal record
Representing Spain
European championships
Gold medal – first place	1957 Paris	All-around
Gold medal – first place	1957 Paris	Pommel horse
Gold medal – first place	1957 Paris	Rings
Gold medal – first place	1957 Paris	Parallel bars
Silver medal – second place	1957 Paris	Horizontal bar

Joaquín Blume (Catalan: Joaquim Blume; 21 June 1933 – 29 April 1959) was a Spanish gymnast. The son of a German gymnastics instructor established in Barcelona, he belonged to the gymnastics section of FC Barcelona.

He became Spanish gymnastics champion at 15 and he competed in the 1952 Summer Olympics of Helsinki with only 19 years. He went to win eight medals in the 1955 Mediterranean Games and in 1957 he won the European Championship, defeating favourite Yuri Titov. He was a favourite for the 1956 Summer Olympics of Melbourne, until Spain boycotted the games in protest against the presence of the USSR, after their brutal suppression of the Hungarian Revolution.

He was also a favourite in the 1960 Summer Olympics, but he died in a plane crash at the Valdemeca mountains, in Cuenca, on 29 April 1959. The plane was headed for Canarias, where the Spanish gymnastics team were to do a gymnastics exhibition. His wife, also a gymnast and pregnant with their second child, was also a passenger. There were no survivors.

In his honour, the Catalan Gymnastics Federation started in 1969 the Memorial Joaquim Blume tournament, first only of male gymnastics with female competition introduced in 1972. A sculpture in his honour is displayed at the Gardens of Joan Brossa, in Barcelona.
