= Peter Weber (gymnast) =

East German gymnast

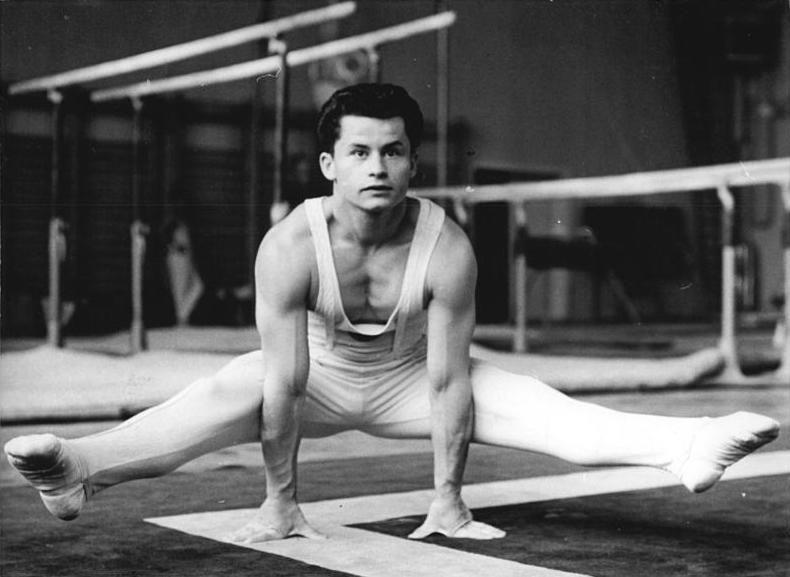
- Weber in 1962

Personal information
- Born: 22 December 1938 Finsterwalde, Nazi Germany
- Died: 17 May 2024 (aged 85) Berlin, Germany
- Height: 1.61 m (5 ft 3 in)

Gymnastics career
- Discipline: Men's artistic gymnastics
- Country represented: East Germany
- Club: Armeesportklub Vorwärts Potsdam
Medal record
Men's artistic gymnastics
Representing Germany
Olympic Games
Bronze medal – third place	1964 Tokyo	Team
Representing East Germany
Olympic Games
Bronze medal – third place	1968 Mexico City	Team
World Championships
Bronze medal – third place	1966 Dortmund	Team

Peter Weber (22 December 1938 – 17 May 2024) was a German gymnast. He competed in all artistic gymnastics events at the 1964 and 1968 Summer Olympics and won two bronze medals in the team classification. Individually, his best achievement was 16th place in the rings in 1964. He also won a bronze medal with the East German team at the 1966 World Artistic Gymnastics Championships. Nationally, he won two titles in the rings, in 1964 and 1967, and one on the floor in 1965.
