= Matthias Brehme =

East German gymnast

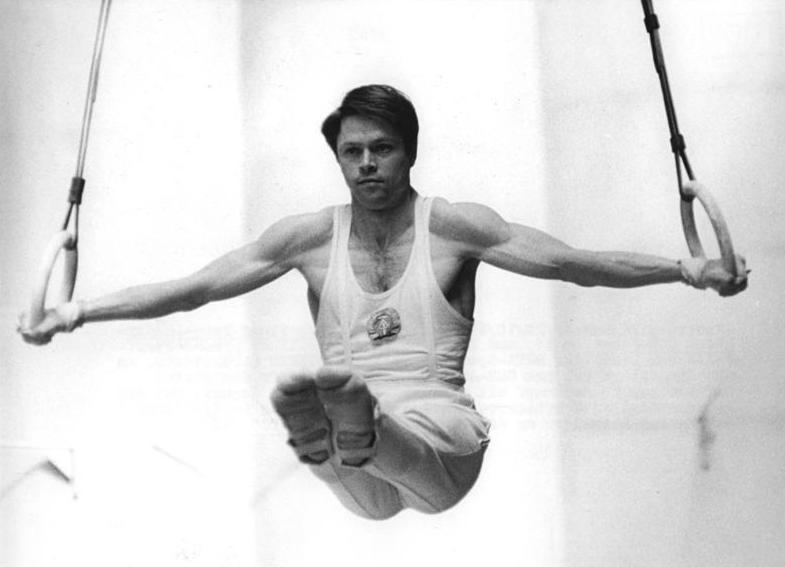
- Brehme in 1969

Personal information
- Born: 7 February 1943 (age 83) Markkleeberg, Nazi Germany
- Height: 1.69 m (5 ft 7 in)

Gymnastics career
- Discipline: Men's artistic gymnastics
- Country represented: East Germany
- Club: SC DHfK Leipzig
Medal record
Men's artistic gymnastics
Representing East Germany
Event	1st	2nd	3rd
Olympic Games	0	0	2
World Championships	0	0	2
European Championships	0	1	0
Total	0	1	4
Olympic Games
Bronze medal – third place	1968 Mexico City	Team
Bronze medal – third place	1972 Munich	Team
World Championships
Bronze medal – third place	1966 Dortmund	Team
Bronze medal – third place	1970 Ljubljana	Team
European Championships
Silver medal – second place	1971 Madrid	Pommel horse

Matthias Brehme (born 7 February 1943) is a German former gymnast. He competed at the 1968 and 1972 Summer Olympics in all artistic gymnastics events and won two bronze medals with the East German team. Individually, his best achievement was shared sixth place in the vault in 1972. He won two more bronze team medals at the world championships in 1966 and 1970 and finished second in the pommel horse at the European Championships in 1972.
