= Radostice =

- Municipality
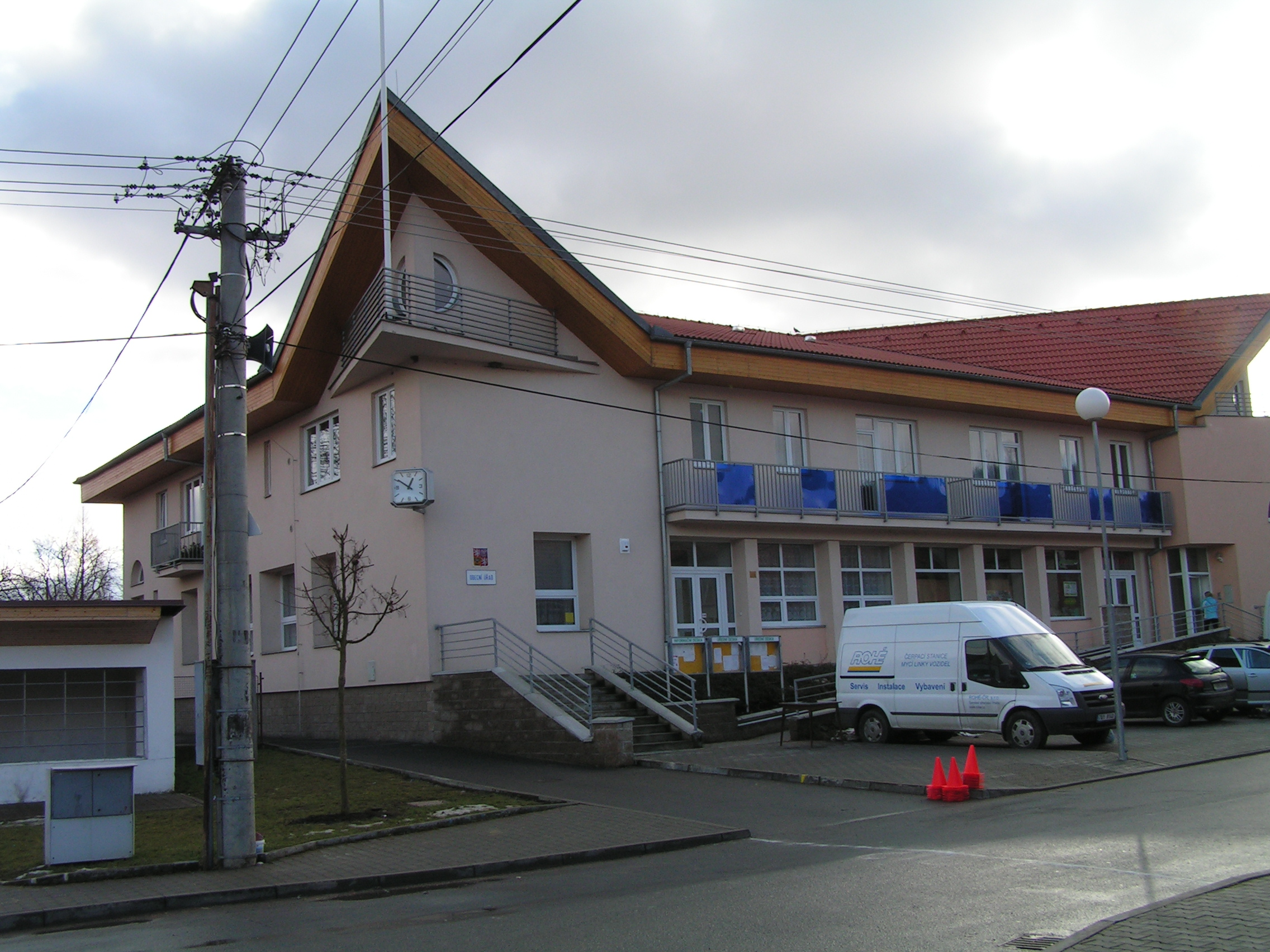
- Municipal office

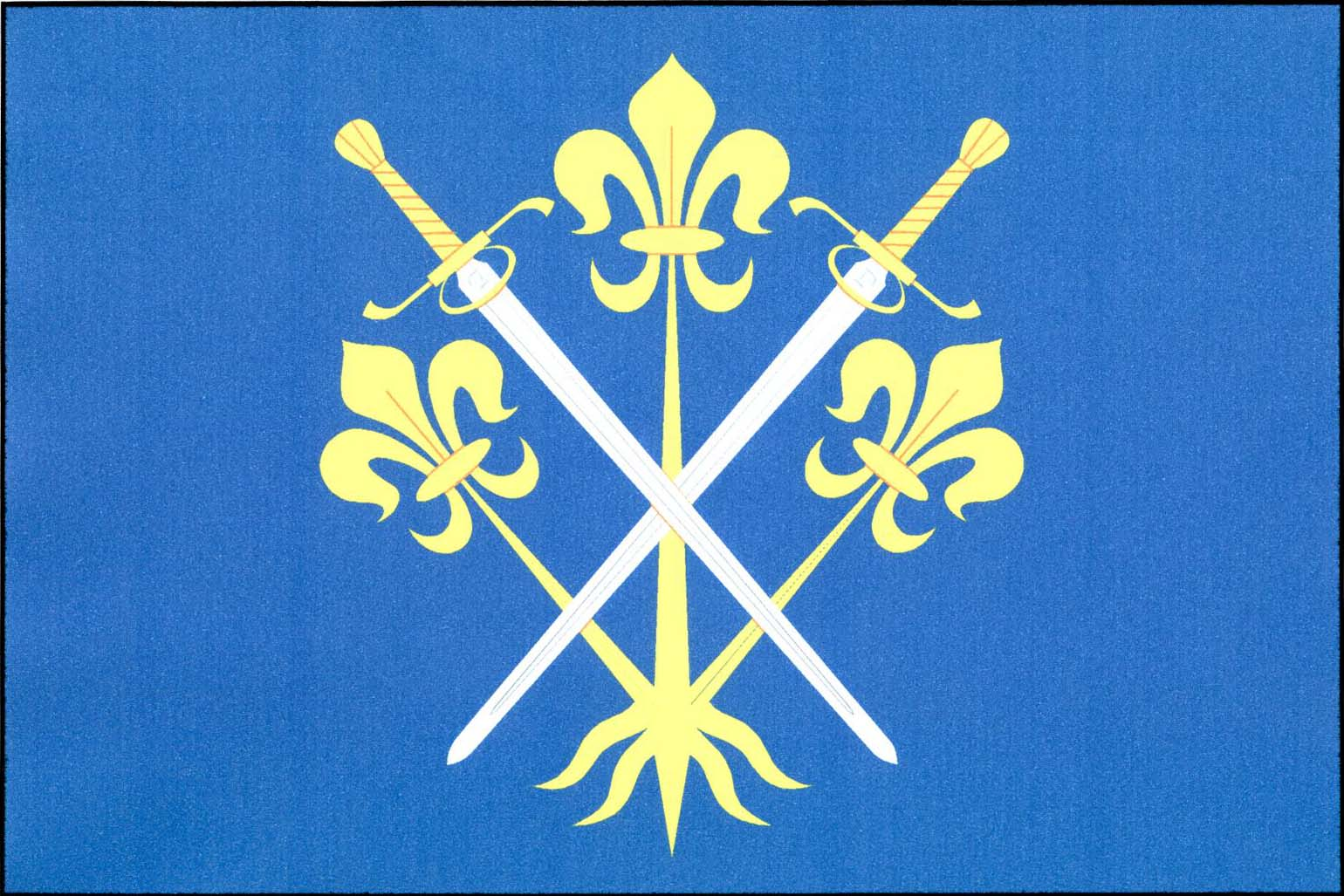
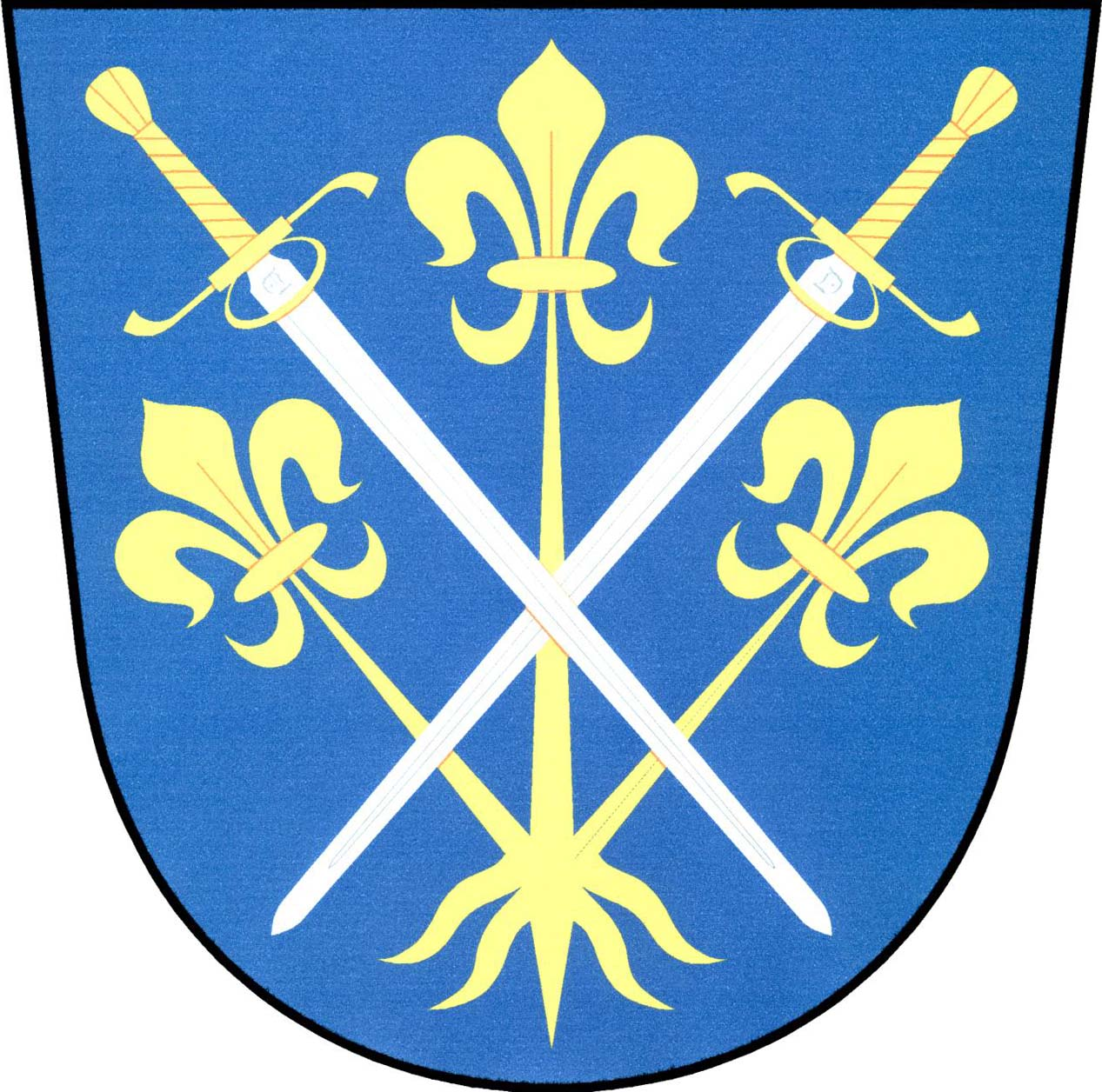
- Flag Coat of arms

- Location in the Czech Republic
- Coordinates: 49°8′1″N 16°28′37″E
- Country: Czech Republic
- Region: South Moravian
- District: Brno-Country
- First mentioned: 1330

Area
  - Total: 4.36 km^{2} (1.68 sq mi)
- Elevation: 284 m (932 ft)

Population (2026-01-01)
  - Total: 783
  - Density: 180/km^{2} (465/sq mi)
- Time zone: UTC+1 (CET)
  - Summer (DST): UTC+2 (CEST)
- Postal codes: 664 46
- Website: www.radostice.cz

Radostice is a municipality and village in Brno-Country District in the South Moravian Region of the Czech Republic. It has about 800 inhabitants.

Radostice lies approximately 13 kilometres (8 mi) south-west of Brno and 183 km (114 mi) south-east of Prague.

== Demographics ==
Historical population
| Year | Pop. | ±% |
|---|---|---|
| 1869 | 224 | — |
| 1880 | 276 | +23.2% |
| 1890 | 334 | +21.0% |
| 1900 | 406 | +21.6% |
| 1910 | 480 | +18.2% |
| 1921 | 572 | +19.2% |
| 1930 | 667 | +16.6% |
| 1950 | 760 | +13.9% |
| 1961 | 808 | +6.3% |
| 1970 | 732 | −9.4% |
| 1980 | 703 | −4.0% |
| 1991 | 609 | −13.4% |
| 2001 | 644 | +5.7% |
| 2011 | 762 | +18.3% |
| 2021 | 760 | −0.3% |
Source: Censuses

== Notable people ==
- Ladislav Pazdera (born 1936), gymnast
- Martin Havelka (1958–2020), actor; lived here
