= Yury Tsapenko =

Soviet artistic gymnast

- Юрий Яковлевич Цапенко
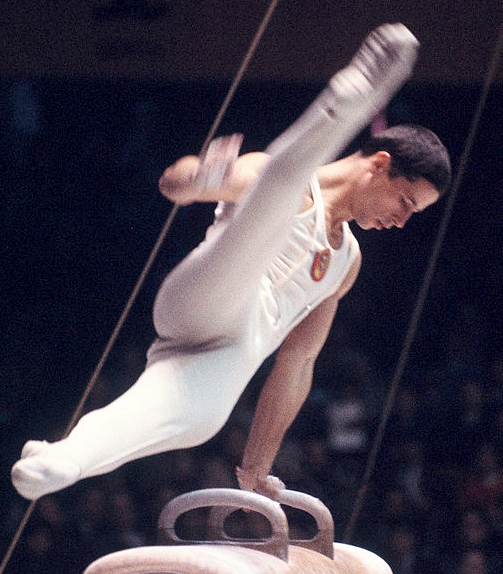
- Tsapenko at the 1964 Summer Olympics

Personal information
- Full name: Yury Yakovlevich Tsapenko
- Born: 25 July 1938 Alma-Ata, Kazakh SSR, Soviet Union
- Died: 22 July 2012 (aged 73)

Gymnastics career
- Discipline: Men's artistic gymnastics
- Country represented: Soviet Union
- Club: Dynamo Moscow
Medal record
Men's artistic gymnastics
Representing Soviet Union
Olympic Games
Silver medal – second place	1964 Tokyo	Team
Bronze medal – third place	1964 Tokyo	Pommel horse

Yury Yakovlevich Tsapenko (Russian: Юрий Яковлевич Цапенко; 25 July 1938 – 22 July 2012) was a Soviet artistic gymnast. He competed at the 1964 Summer Olympics in all artistic gymnastics events and won a silver medal in the team allround competition and a bronze medal on the pommel horse.

During his career he won five national titles: on the floor (1961), parallel bars (1961) and pommel horse (1961, 1963, 1964). After retirement he worked as a coach, first in Moscow and then in his native Almaty. His wife Natalya Tsapenko was also a former competitive gymnast and coach.
