= Sven Tippelt =

East German gymnast

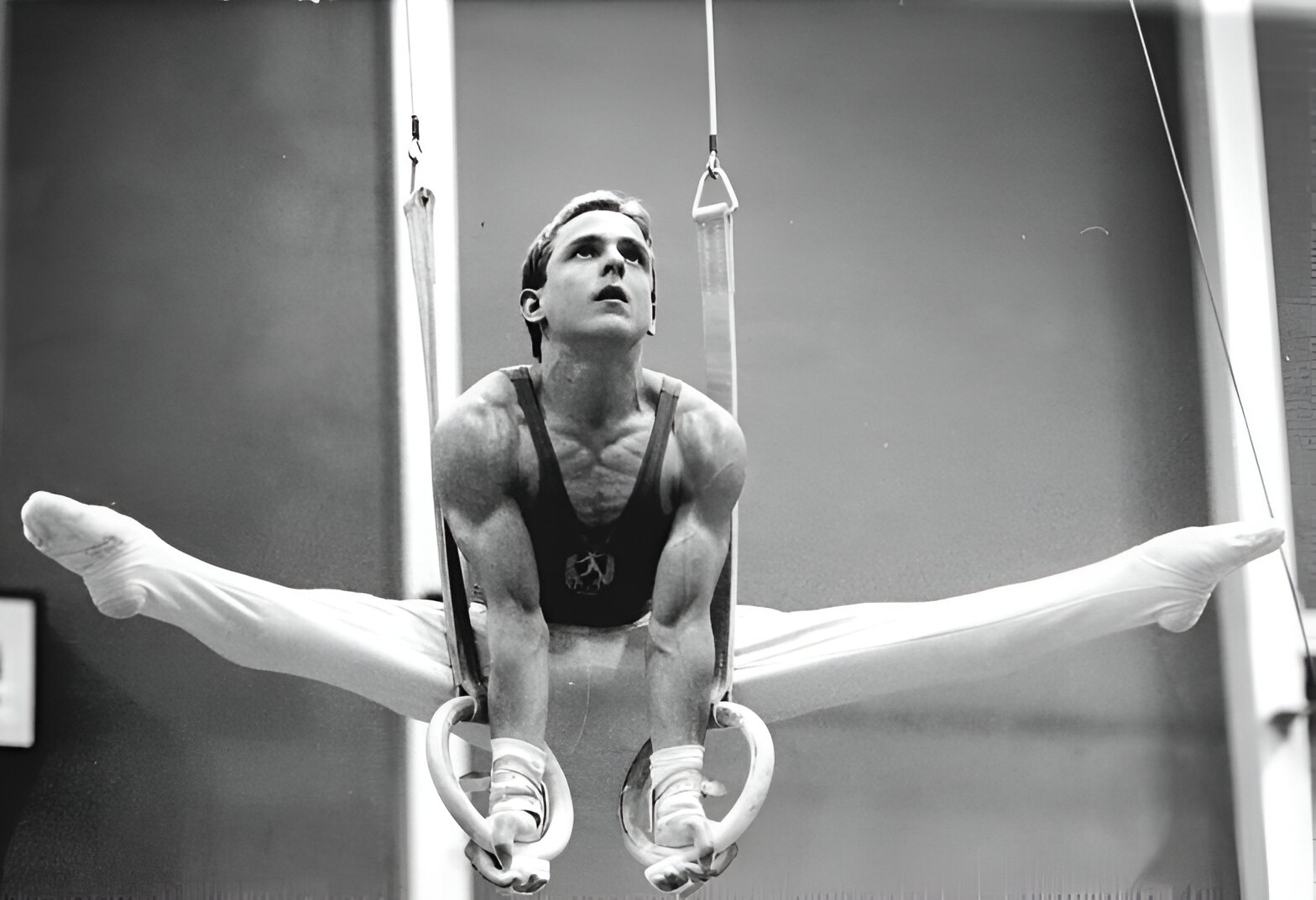
- Sven Tippelt in 1986

Personal information
- Born: 3 June 1965 (age 61) Leipzig, East Germany
- Height: 1.56 m (5 ft 1 in)

Gymnastics career
- Country represented: Germany
- Former countries represented: East Germany
- Club: Sportclub Deutsche Hochschule für Körperkultur Leipzig; Sportverein Deilinghofen
- Eponymous skills: Tippelt D (0.4) (Parallel bars): Moy piked with straddle backward to handstand
- Retired: yes
Medal record
Representing East Germany
Olympic Games
Silver medal – second place	1988 Seoul	Team
Bronze medal – third place	1988 Seoul	Parallel bars
Bronze medal – third place	1988 Seoul	Rings
World Championships
Silver medal – second place	1989 Stuttgart	Team
Bronze medal – third place	1985 Montreal	Team
Bronze medal – third place	1987 Rotterdam	Team
Bronze medal – third place	1987 Rotterdam	Parallel bars

Sven Tippelt (born 3 June 1965) is a retired German gymnast. He competed at the 1988 and 1992 Summer Olympics, finishing in second and fourth place with the East German team, respectively. Individually, he won bronze medals on rings and parallel bars in 1988. He won one silver and three bronze medals at the World Championships in 1985, 1987 and 1989.

After retiring from competitions, he completed his physical education studies in Leipzig via distance learning, with a thesis in biomechanics. Instead of pursuing a coaching career, he became a physiotherapist and now works at a rehabilitation clinic in Bad Salzuflen.
