= Günter Beier =

East German gymnast

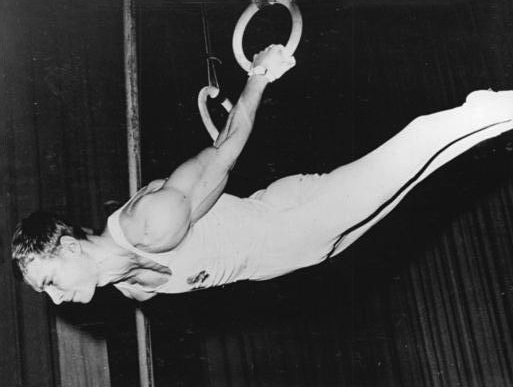
- Beier in 1968

Personal information
- Born: 2 March 1942 (age 84) Altenburg, Nazi Germany
- Height: 1.67 m (5 ft 6 in)

Gymnastics career
- Discipline: Men's artistic gymnastics
- Country represented: East Germany
- Club: Armeesportklub Vorwärts Potsdam
Medal record
Men's artistic gymnastics
Representing East Germany
Olympic Games
Bronze medal – third place	1968 Mexico City	Team

Günter Beier (born 2 March 1942) is a German former gymnast. He competed at the 1968 Summer Olympics in all artistic gymnastics events and won a bronze medal with the East German team. Individually, his best achievement was 15th place in the vault. He won four consecutive national titles in the vault in 1964–1967.

== Sports links ==
- Günter Beier at Olympedia
