= Michael Nikolay =

East German gymnast

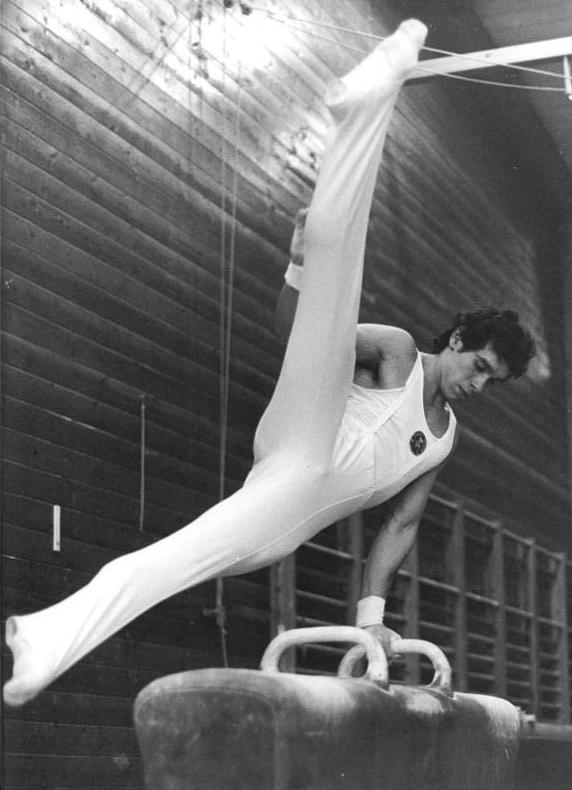
- Nikolay in 1979

Personal information
- Born: 13 December 1956 (age 69) East Berlin, East Germany
- Height: 1.75 m (5 ft 9 in)

Gymnastics career
- Discipline: Men's artistic gymnastics
- Country represented: East Germany
- Club: SC Dynamo Berlin
Medal record
Olympic Games
Silver medal – second place	1980 Moscow	Team
Bronze medal – third place	1976 Montreal	Pommel horse
Bronze medal – third place	1976 Montreal	Team
Bronze medal – third place	1980 Moscow	Pommel horse
World Championships
Gold medal – first place	1981 Moscow	Pommel horse
Bronze medal – third place	1978 Strasbourg	Team
European Championships
Silver medal – second place	1977 Vilnius	Pommel horse

Michael Nikolay (born 13 December 1956) is a retired German gymnast. He competed at the 1976 and 1980 Summer Olympics in all artistic gymnastics events and won a bronze and a silver medal with the East German team, respectively. Individually, he won two bronze medals in the pommel horse at both Games; he also finished fourth on the horizontal bar and on the parallel bars in 1980.

At the World Championships, he won a gold medal in the pommel horse in 1981 and a bronze in the team competition in 1978. He also won a European silver in the pommel horse in 1977.
