= Krisztofer Mészáros =

Hungarian artistic gymnast

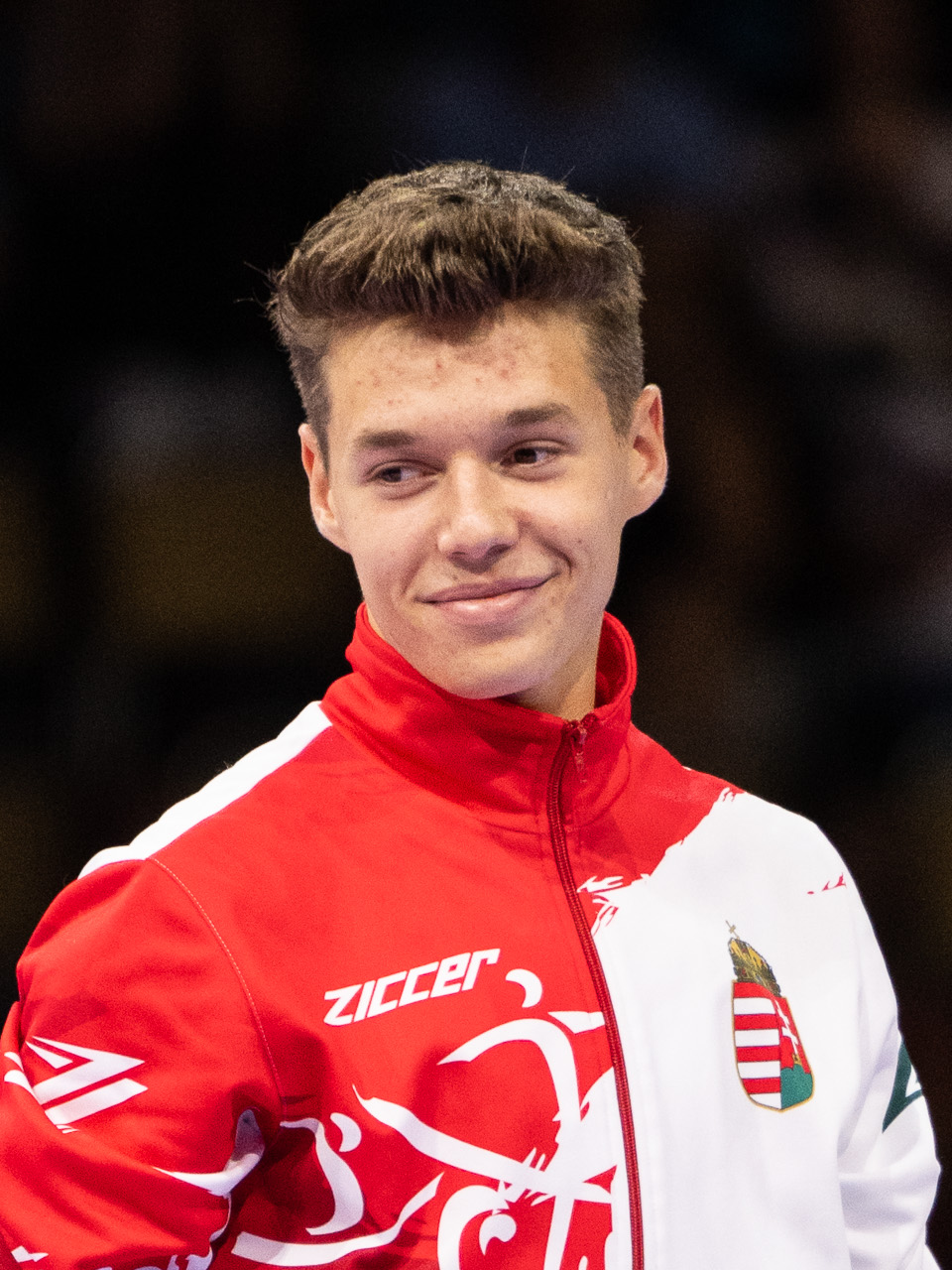
- Mészáros at the 2022 European Championships

Personal information
- Nickname: Titi
- Born: 5 September 2001 (age 25) Győr, Hungary
- Height: 166 cm (5 ft 5 in)

Gymnastics career
- Discipline: Men's artistic gymnastics
- Country represented: Hungary
- Club: Győri AC
- Head coach: Róbert Szűcs
Medal record
Representing Hungary
Men's artistic Gymnastics
European Championships
Silver medal – second place	2022 Munich	Floor exercise
Bronze medal – third place	2020 Mersin	Team
Bronze medal – third place	2024 Rimini	Floor exercise
Bronze medal – third place	2025 Leipzig	All-around
FIG World Cup
Event	1st	2nd	3rd
World Challenge Cup	6	6	7
Total	6	6	7

Krisztofer Mészáros (born 5 September 2001) is a Hungarian artistic gymnast. He is the 2025 European all-around bronze medalist. At the 2022 European Championships, he won the silver medal on floor exercise and was Hungary's first European silver medalist on that apparatus. He won a bronze medal with the Hungarian team at the 2020 European Championships. He represented Hungary at the 2024 Summer Olympics, where he finished 9th in the individual all-around final.

== Gymnastics career ==
Mészáros followed his sister into gymnastics, and he was inspired by watching Krisztián Berki win Olympic gold in 2012.

=== Junior ===
Mészáros finished eighth with the Hungarian team at the 2016 European Junior Championships. At the 2017 European Youth Olympic Festival, he finished eighth in the floor exercise final and 24th in the all-around. He then won three silver medals at the 2017 Olympic Hopes Cup- on floor exercise, pommel horse, and still rings. He finished 14th in the all-around and seventh on the pommel horse at the 2018 European Junior Championships.

=== Senior ===
==== 2019–2021 ====
Mészáros began competing in senior international competitions in 2019. He competed at the 2019 European and 2019 World Championships but did not qualify for any finals. At the 2020 European Championships, he helped the Hungarian team win the bronze medal behind Ukraine and Turkey. In the event finals, he finished sixth on floor exercise and pommel horse and fifth on parallel bars.

Mészáros won his first FIG World Cup medal at the Osijek World Challenge Cup with a bronze on the pommel horse. He then qualified for the all-around final at the 2021 World Championships- the first Hungarian gymnast to do so since 1999 - and finished 14th.

==== 2022 ====
Mészáros began the 2022 season at the Osijek World Challenge Cup, finishing eighth on floor exercise, fourth on pommel horse, and fifth on parallel bars. Then at the Koper World Challenge Cup, he won the bronze medal on the pommel horse. He helped the Hungarian team finished sixth at the 2022 European Championships, and he finished sixth in the all-around. In the floor exercise final, he won the silver medal behind the defending Olympic champion Artem Dolgopyat. This marked the first time a Hungarian gymnast won a European silver medal on floor exercise, after Róbert Gál and György Guczoghy won bronze medals on the event. At the Szombathely World Challenge Cup, Mészáros won his first FIG World Cup title on the horizontal bar. Then at the World Championships, he once again finished 14th in the all-around final.

==== 2023 ====
Mészáros finished 17th in the all-around final and fifth in the horizontal bar final at the 2023 European Championships. He won four medals at the 2023 Tel Aviv World Challenge Cup- gold on floor exercise and vault and silver on pommel horse and parallel bars- making him the most decorated gymnast of the event. Then at the Osijek World Challenge Cup, he won the bronze medal on floor exercise. He then won three medals at the Szombathely World Challenge Cup- gold on floor exercise, silver on parallel bars, and bronze on horizontal bar. At the end of the World Challenge Cup series, he was ranked first on parallel bars and top five on every event besides still rings. Mészáros finished 18th all-around in the qualification round of the 2023 World Championships. As one of the top eight gymnasts not from a country that qualified a full team, he earned an individual quota for the 2024 Olympic Games. He finished 11th in the all-around final with a total score of 81.665.

== Competitive history ==
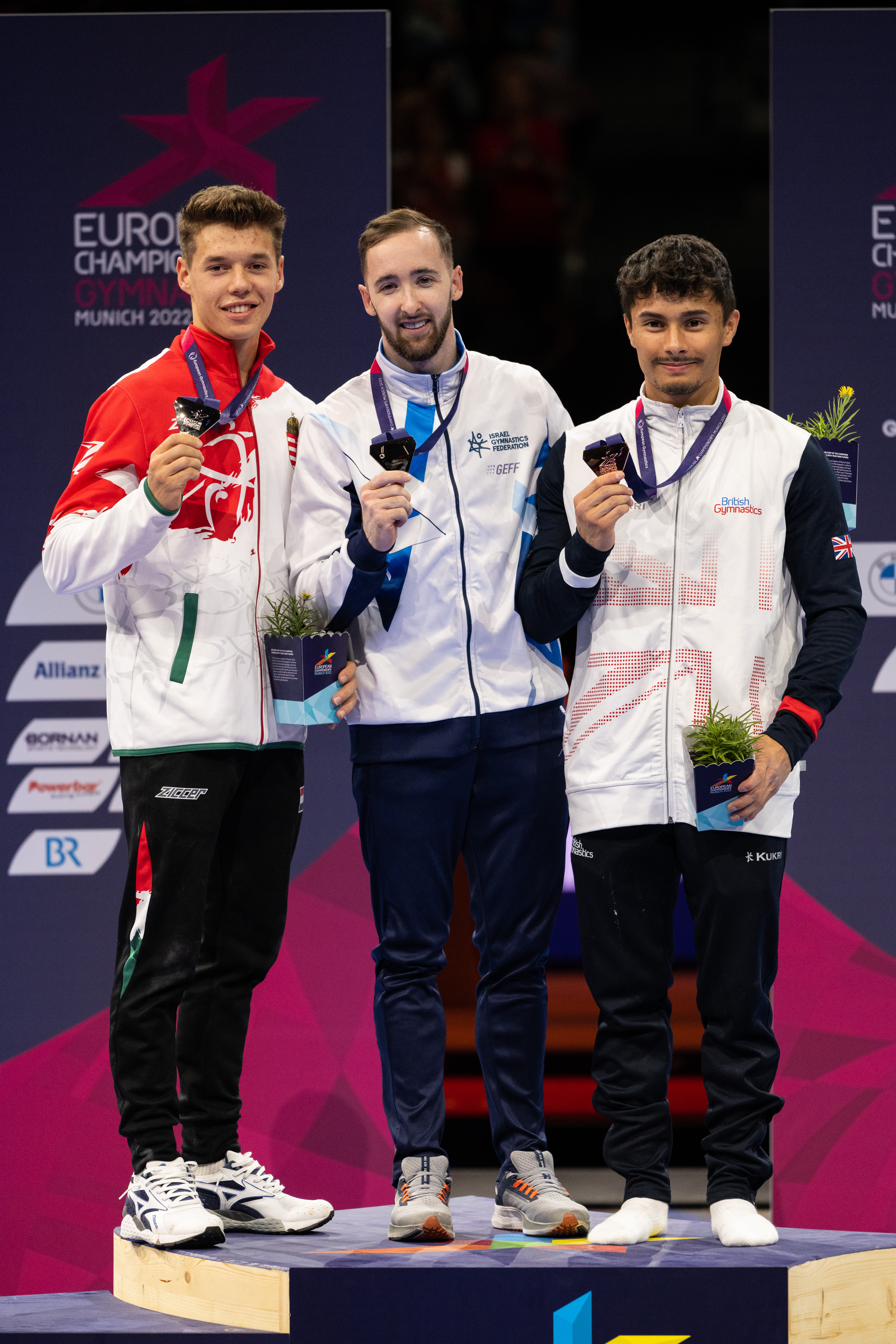
Mészáros (left) with his silver medal at the 2022 European Championships

Competitive history of Krisztofer Mészáros at the junior level
Year	Event	Team	AA	FX	PH	SR	VT	PB	HB
2015	Olympic Hopes Cup	4	18						
2016
2016	Junior European Championships	8							
2016	Olympic Hopes Cup	2nd place, silver medalist(s)	4		2nd place, silver medalist(s)			5	7
2017	European Youth Olympic Festival		24	8					
2017	Olympic Hopes Cup			2nd place, silver medalist(s)	2nd place, silver medalist(s)	2nd place, silver medalist(s)			8
2018	International Junior Team Cup	6	7	6	3rd place, bronze medalist(s)				
2018	Budapest Men's Friendly	1st place, gold medalist(s)							
2018	Junior European Championships	10	14		7				
2018	Hungarian Master Championships		3rd place, bronze medalist(s)		2nd place, silver medalist(s)	2nd place, silver medalist(s)		4	3rd place, bronze medalist(s)

Competitive history of Krisztofer Mészáros at the senior level
Year	Event	Team	AA	FX	PH	SR	VT	PB	HB
2019	Osijek World Challenge Cup			8					
2019	European Championships		51						
2019	Koper World Challenge Cup			R2					
2019	Szombathely World Challenge Cup			6					
2019	World Championships		71						
2019	Hungarian Master Championships		1st place, gold medalist(s)	1st place, gold medalist(s)	3rd place, bronze medalist(s)	1st place, gold medalist(s)	2nd place, silver medalist(s)	4	
2020	Szombathely World Challenge Cup			6	8				
2020	Hungarian Championships		1st place, gold medalist(s)	1st place, gold medalist(s)	4	2nd place, silver medalist(s)	1st place, gold medalist(s)	2nd place, silver medalist(s)	2nd place, silver medalist(s)
2020	Hungarian Master Championships		1st place, gold medalist(s)	1st place, gold medalist(s)	1st place, gold medalist(s)	2nd place, silver medalist(s)	1st place, gold medalist(s)		1st place, gold medalist(s)
2020	European Championships	3rd place, bronze medalist(s)		6	6			5	
2021	Hungarian Super Team Championships	1st place, gold medalist(s)	1st place, gold medalist(s)	1st place, gold medalist(s)		1st place, gold medalist(s)	1st place, gold medalist(s)	1st place, gold medalist(s)	
2021	European Championships		32						
2021	Varna World Challenge Cup			7	4				
2021	Osijek World Challenge Cup			4	3rd place, bronze medalist(s)				
2021	Koper World Challenge Cup			6					
2021	Mersin World Challenge Cup			5			6		
2021	Hungarian Grand Prix			3rd place, bronze medalist(s)	3rd place, bronze medalist(s)			2nd place, silver medalist(s)	7
2021	Hungarian Championships		1st place, gold medalist(s)	1st place, gold medalist(s)	1st place, gold medalist(s)	2nd place, silver medalist(s)	3rd place, bronze medalist(s)	3rd place, bronze medalist(s)	2nd place, silver medalist(s)
2021	World Championships		14						
2022	Osijek World Challenge Cup			8	4			5	
2022	Koper World Challenge Cup				3rd place, bronze medalist(s)				
2022	European Championships	6	6	2nd place, silver medalist(s)					
2022	Hungarian Championships			1st place, gold medalist(s)	1st place, gold medalist(s)	3rd place, bronze medalist(s)	1st place, gold medalist(s)	2nd place, silver medalist(s)	2nd place, silver medalist(s)
2022	Szombathely World Challenge Cup				9		11		1st place, gold medalist(s)
2022	World Championships	12	14						
2022	Hungarian Master Championships		1st place, gold medalist(s)	1st place, gold medalist(s)	1st place, gold medalist(s)	2nd place, silver medalist(s)	1st place, gold medalist(s)	1st place, gold medalist(s)	6
2023	Hungarian Apparatus Championships			1st place, gold medalist(s)	1st place, gold medalist(s)	1st place, gold medalist(s)		1st place, gold medalist(s)	
2023	European Championships	10	17						5
2023	Tel Aviv World Challenge Cup			1st place, gold medalist(s)	2nd place, silver medalist(s)		1st place, gold medalist(s)	2nd place, silver medalist(s)	4
2023	Osijek World Challenge Cup			3rd place, bronze medalist(s)	6			5	
2023	Hungarian Championships		1st place, gold medalist(s)	1st place, gold medalist(s)	1st place, gold medalist(s)	1st place, gold medalist(s)	1st place, gold medalist(s)	1st place, gold medalist(s)	2nd place, silver medalist(s)
2023	Mersin World Challenge Cup						6	5	
2023	Szombathely World Challenge Cup			1st place, gold medalist(s)	6			2nd place, silver medalist(s)	3rd place, bronze medalist(s)
2023	World Championships	20	11						
2024	Varna Challenge Cup							3rd place, bronze medalist(s)	
2024	Koper Challenge Cup				7			7	
2024	Osijek Challenge Cup			6				8	
2024	European Championships		5	3rd place, bronze medalist(s)					
2024	Olympic Games		9						
2024	Szombathely Challenge Cup			1st place, gold medalist(s)				2nd place, silver medalist(s)	1st place, gold medalist(s)
2025	Osijek World Cup					1st place, gold medalist(s)			
2025	European Championships		3rd place, bronze medalist(s)						6
2025	Szombathely World Challenge Cup				2nd place, silver medalist(s)			3rd place, bronze medalist(s)	
2025	World Championships	—N/a	8	7					
2026
2026	European Championships	8	13					7	
2026	Hungarian Master Championships							1st place, gold medalist(s)	1st place, gold medalist(s)
2026	World Championships	18	21						
