= Gymnastics at the 1964 Summer Olympics – Men's artistic team all-around =

Men's artistic team all-around at the Games of the XVIII Olympiad
- Venue: Tokyo Metropolitan Gymnasium
- Date: 18–20 October 1964
- Competitors: 108 from 18 nations
- Winning total: 577.95 points

Medalists
| 1st place, gold medalist(s) | | Yukio Endo; Takuji Hayata; Takashi Mitsukuri; Takashi Ono; Shuji Tsurumi; Haruhiro Yamashita | Japan |
| 2nd place, silver medalist(s) | | Sergey Diomidov; Viktor Leontev; Viktor Lisitsky; Boris Shakhlin; Yuri Titov; Yuri Tsapenko | Soviet Union |
| 3rd place, bronze medalist(s) | | Siegfried Fülle; Philipp Fürst; Erwin Koppe; Klaus Köste; Günter Lyhs; Peter Weber | United Team of Germany |

The men's team competition was a gymnastics event contested as part of the Gymnastics at the 1964 Summer Olympics programme at the Tokyo Metropolitan Gymnasium.

== Results ==
The score for the team was a sum of its 6 members best scores. In each of the 6 apparatuses, the top 5 scores in each category (compulsory and optional) were summed, for a total of 12 categories. 600 points were possible.

| Rank | Country | C | V | C | V | C | V | C | V | C | V | C | V | Total Points |
|---|---|---|---|---|---|---|---|---|---|---|---|---|---|---|
| Gold medal | Japan | 48.00 | 48.10 | 47.80 | 47.90 | 48.25 | 48.15 | 48.25 | 48.35 | 48.40 | 48.35 | 48.30 | 48.10 | 577.95 |
| Silver medal | Soviet Union | 47.85 | 47.95 | 47.20 | 47.20 | 47.90 | 48.15 | 48.15 | 48.25 | 48.25 | 48.05 | 48.20 | 48.40 | 575.45 |
| Bronze medal | United Team of Germany | 47.05 | 47.15 | 47.45 | 47.05 | 46.45 | 47.35 | 45.95 | 48.05 | 47.20 | 47.55 | 46.60 | 47.25 | 565.10 |
| 4. | Italy | 45.95 | 46.90 | 46.00 | 46.65 | 46.60 | 47.05 | 46.40 | 47.50 | 47.50 | 47.45 | 46.25 | 46.65 | 560.90 |
| 5. | Poland | 46.55 | 47.10 | 46.45 | 44.65 | 46.20 | 46.35 | 47.40 | 47.20 | 47.05 | 46.30 | 46.95 | 47.30 | 559.50 |
| 6. | Czechoslovakia | 45.95 | 46.50 | 45.05 | 46.55 | 45.85 | 46.60 | 46.85 | 47.80 | 46.80 | 47.15 | 46.40 | 46.65 | 558.15 |
| 7. | United States | 45.50 | 46.80 | 46.35 | 46.00 | 46.30 | 46.70 | 46.65 | 47.55 | 46.70 | 46.10 | 46.20 | 46.10 | 556.95 |
| 8. | Finland | 46.60 | 47.25 | 46.50 | 46.20 | 44.35 | 45.25 | 47.15 | 47.70 | 46.30 | 47.00 | 46.10 | 45.80 | 556.20 |
| 9. | Hungary | 46.35 | 45.30 | 45.60 | 45.10 | 45.70 | 45.90 | 47.05 | 47.30 | 46.80 | 46.60 | 46.95 | 47.05 | 555.70 |
| 10. | Bulgaria | 45.20 | 46.40 | 45.80 | 45.80 | 45.40 | 46.05 | 46.25 | 47.45 | 46.25 | 46.30 | 46.90 | 47.15 | 555.65 |
| 11. | Yugoslavia | 45.35 | 45.35 | 46.25 | 46.20 | 45.45 | 46.25 | 46.70 | 47.15 | 46.80 | 46.50 | 46.80 | 46.00 | 554.80 |
| 12. | Romania | 45.95 | 45.95 | 45.50 | 45.15 | 44.50 | 45.80 | 46.55 | 47.45 | 46.25 | 46.55 | 44.90 | 46.10 | 550.65 |
| 13. | South Korea | 45.20 | 46.45 | 45.10 | 44.90 | 45.05 | 44.55 | 45.95 | 47.00 | 46.45 | 46.00 | 46.30 | 46.55 | 549.50 |
| 14. | Switzerland | 45.30 | 44.55 | 45.75 | 45.95 | 42.15 | 43.60 | 47.30 | 47.90 | 46.65 | 46.50 | 44.60 | 45.90 | 546.15 |
| 15. | Cuba | 44.75 | 44.30 | 42.60 | 39.90 | 41.45 | 43.20 | 45.95 | 46.30 | 43.85 | 44.55 | 42.00 | 44.10 | 522.95 |
| 16. | Australia | 43.00 | 43.20 | 41.25 | 41.55 | 38.70 | 40.75 | 46.05 | 45.65 | 43.00 | 44.55 | 41.45 | 42.85 | 512.00 |
| 17. | Taiwan | 42.35 | 42.65 | 32.15 | 30.45 | 40.60 | 41.15 | 45.40 | 44.60 | 42.75 | 44.70 | 42.25 | 44.00 | 493.05 |
| 18. | India | 40.70 | 40.10 | 35.70 | 30.50 | 31.80 | 36.45 | 42.95 | 43.75 | 33.85 | 37.25 | 28.15 | 27.15 | 428.35 |

== Sources ==
- Tokyo Organizing Committee (1964). The Games of the XVIII Olympiad: Tokyo 1964, vol. 2.
