= Fredericks (surname) =

Fredericks is a surname. Notable people with the surname include:

== Sports ==
- Clayton Fredericks (born 1967), Australian equestrian athlete and Olympic medalist (married to Lisa Fredericks)
- Cornel Fredericks (born 1990), South African hurdler
- Eddie Fredericks (born 1977), South African rugby union footballer
- Frankie Fredericks (born 1967), Namibian sprinter and Olympic medalist
- Lucinda Fredericks (born 1967), British-born equestrian athlete for Australia (married to Clayton Fredericks)
- Roy Fredericks (1942–2000), West Indian cricketer
- Ryan Fredericks (born 1992), English footballer for Bristol City Football Club
- Stanton Fredericks (born 1978), South African footballer

== Arts ==
- Carole Fredericks (1952–2001), American French-speaking blues singer
- Charles DeForest Fredricks (1823–1894), American photographer
- Charles Fredericks (1918–1970), American actor in 1950/60s Westerns
- Dean Fredericks (1924–1999), American actor
- Fred Fredericks (1929–2015), American cartoonist
- Jean Fredericks (1906–1990), Native American photographer
- Mariah Fredericks, American novelist
- Marshall Fredericks (1908–1998), American sculptor
- Neal Fredericks (1969–2004), American cinematographer
- Scott Fredericks (1943–2017), Irish actor
- Sawyer Fredericks, (born 1999), American folk singer-songwriter

== Other ==
- A. A. Fredericks (1891–1975), American educator and Democratic politician in Louisiana
- Ann Fredericks, American politician
- Claude Fredericks (1923–2013), American poet, playwright, printer, writer, and teacher
- Cryn Fredericks (fl. 1600s), Dutch engineer and builder of Fort Amsterdam
- Dave Fredericks (born 1968), Australian computer consultant
- Edmund Fitzgerald Fredericks (d. 1935), Guyanese lawyer and Pan-African activist
- Hal Fredericks, Canadian author and economic consultant
- John D. Fredericks (1869–1945), American politician and Republican Representative for California

== See also ==
- Alice O'Fredericks (1899–1968), Danish actress and film director
- Frederick's of Hollywood, American lingerie retailer
- Frederick (given name)
- Friedrich (surname)
