= 1961 European Men's Artistic Gymnastics Championships =

4th European Men's Artistic Gymnastics Championships
- Location: Luxembourg, Luxembourg
- Start date: 13 August 1961
- End date: 14 August 1961

The 4th European Men's Artistic Gymnastics Championships was held in Luxembourg from 13–14 August 1961.

== Medalists ==
Event	Gold	Silver	Bronze
All-around	(Socialist Federal Republic of Yugoslavia) Miroslav Cerar	(Soviet Union) Yuri Titov	(Italy) Giovanni Carminucci
Floor	(Italy) Franco Menichelli	(Soviet Union) Viktor Leontyev	(Socialist Federal Republic of Yugoslavia) Miroslav Cerar
Pommel horse	(Socialist Federal Republic of Yugoslavia) Miroslav Cerar	(West Germany) Philipp Fürst (Soviet Union) Viktor Leontyev	Not awarded
Rings	(Socialist Federal Republic of Yugoslavia) Miroslav Cerar (Bulgaria) Velik Kapsazov (Soviet Union) Yuri Titov	Not awarded	
Vault	(Italy) Giovanni Carminucci	(Italy) Franco Menichelli	(Socialist Federal Republic of Yugoslavia) Miroslav Cerar (Switzerland) Ernst Fivian (Sweden) William Thoresson
Parallel bars	(Socialist Federal Republic of Yugoslavia) Miroslav Cerar	(Soviet Union) Viktor Leontyev	(Italy) Giovanni Carminucci (Italy) Franco Menichelli
Horizontal bar	(Soviet Union) Yuri Titov	(Hungary) Rajmund Csányi	(Finland) Otto Kestola

=== Medal table ===
Rank	Nation	Gold	Silver	Bronze	Total
1	Yugoslavia (YUG)	4	0	2	6
2	Soviet Union (URS)	2	4	0	6
3	Italy (ITA)	2	1	3	6
4	Bulgaria (BUL)	1	0	0	1
5	Hungary (HUN)	0	1	0	1
5	West Germany (FRG)	0	1	0	1
7	Finland (FIN)	0	0	1	1
7	Sweden (SWE)	0	0	1	1
7	Switzerland (SUI)	0	0	1	1
Totals (9 entries)		9	7	8	24
