= 1957 European Men's Artistic Gymnastics Championships =

2nd European Men's Artistic Gymnastics Championships
- Location: Paris, France
- Start date: 19 November 1957
- End date: 20 November 1957

The 2nd European Men's Artistic Gymnastics Championships was held in Paris, France from 19–20 November 1957.

== Medalists ==
Event	Gold	Silver	Bronze
All-around	(Spain) Joaquín Blume	(Soviet Union) Yuri Titov	(Switzerland) Max Benker
Floor	(Sweden) William Thoresson	(United Kingdom) Nik Stuart	(West Germany) Herbert Schmitt
Pommel horse	(Spain) Joaquín Blume	(Switzerland) Max Benker	(Socialist Federal Republic of Yugoslavia) Ivan Čaklec
Rings	(Spain) Joaquín Blume	(Soviet Union) Yuri Titov	(Finland) Kalevi Suoniemi
Vault	(Soviet Union) Yuri Titov	(Hungary) Rajmund Csányi	(Sweden) William Thoresson
Parallel bars	(Spain) Joaquín Blume (Switzerland) Jack Günthard	Not awarded	(Switzerland) Max Benker
Horizontal bar	(Switzerland) Jack Günthard	(Spain) Joaquín Blume	(Soviet Union) Yuri Titov

=== Medal table ===
Rank	Nation	Gold	Silver	Bronze	Total
1	Spain (ESP)	4	1	0	5
2	Switzerland (SUI)	2	1	2	5
3	Soviet Union (URS)	1	2	1	4
4	Sweden (SWE)	1	0	1	2
5	Great Britain (GBR)	0	1	0	1
5	Hungary (HUN)	0	1	0	1
7	Finland (FIN)	0	0	1	1
7	West Germany (FRG)	0	0	1	1
7	Yugoslavia (YUG)	0	0	1	1
Totals (9 entries)		8	6	7	21
