= Viktor Leontyev =

Soviet artistic gymnast

- Виктор Анатольевич Леонтьев
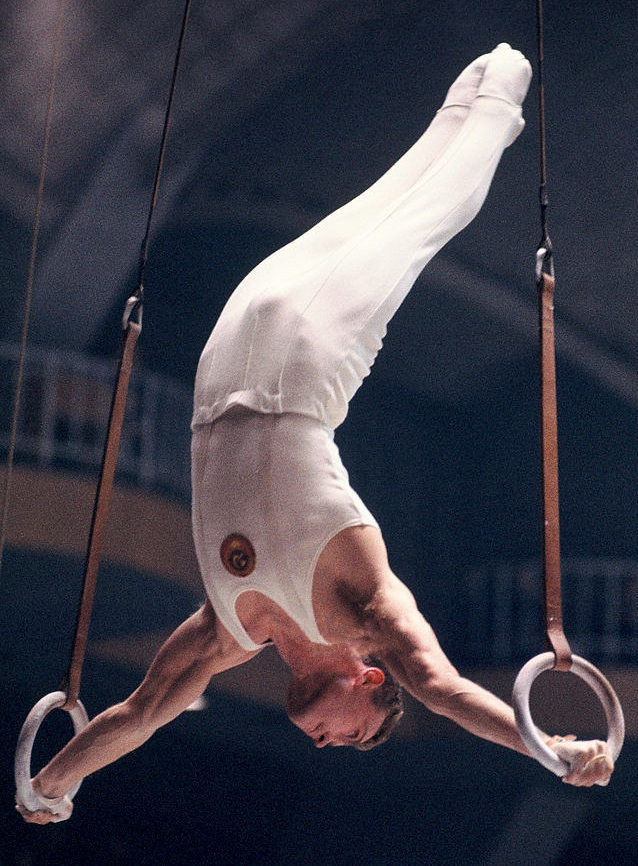
- Leontyev at the 1964 Summer Olympics

Personal information
- Full name: Viktor Anatolyevich Leontyev
- Born: 27 April 1940 (age 86) Moscow, Russian SFSR, Soviet Union
- Height: 1.68 m (5 ft 6 in)

Gymnastics career
- Discipline: Men's artistic gymnastics
- Country represented: Soviet Union
- Club: CSKA Moscow
Medal record
Men's artistic gymnastics
Representing Soviet Union
Olympic Games
Silver medal – second place	1964 Tokyo	Team
World Championships
Silver medal – second place	1962 Prague	Team
European Championships
Silver medal – second place	1961 Luxembourg	Floor
Silver medal – second place	1961 Luxembourg	Pommel horse
Silver medal – second place	1961 Luxembourg	Parallel bars

Viktor Anatolyevich Leontyev (Russian: Виктор Анатольевич Леонтьев; born 27 April 1940) is a retired Soviet artistic gymnast. He competed at the 1964 Summer Olympics in all artistic gymnastics events and won a silver medal in the team all-around competition. Individually he finished in fourth place on the floor and rings.

He won three silver medals at the 1961 European championships, on the floor, pommel horse and parallel bars. The next year he won a silver medal in the team all-round competition at the world championships.

During his career he won four national titles: on the vault (1961) and rings (1963–1965).
