= Velik Kapsazov =

Bulgarian artistic gymnast (1935–2017)

- Велик Николов Капсъзов
- Full name: Velik Nikolov Kapsazov
- Born: 15 April 1935 Asenovgrad, Bulgaria
- Died: 27 March 2017 (aged 81) Sofia, Bulgaria
- Height: 1.67 m (5 ft 6 in)

Gymnastics career
- Discipline: Men's artistic gymnastics
- Country represented: Bulgaria
Medal record
Men's artistic gymnastics
Representing Bulgaria
Event	1st	2nd	3rd
Olympic Games	0	0	1
Universiade	0	0	1
Total	0	0	2
Olympic Games
Bronze medal – third place	1960 Rome	Rings
Universiade
Bronze medal – third place	1961 Sofia	All-around
European championships
Gold medal – first place	1961 Luxembourg	Rings
Gold medal – first place	1963 Belgrade	Rings
Bronze medal – third place	1959 Copenhagen	Rings

Velik Nikolov Kapsazov (Bulgarian: Велик Николов Капсъзов; 15 April 1935 – 27 March 2017) was a Bulgarian gymnast. He competed at the 1956, 1960 and 1964 Summer Olympics in all artistic gymnastics events, and shared a bronze medal in the rings in 1960 with Takashi Ono. This was the first Olympic medal for Bulgaria in gymnastics.

== Early life ==
Kapsazov was born in Asenovgrad on 15 April 1935. He initially trained in weightlifting before he turned to artistic gymnastics. He joined the national team in 1954.

== Gymnastics career ==
At the 1959 European Championships, he won the bronze medal on rings. He later won both the 1961 and 1963 European Championships.

In 1961, he competed at the 1961 Summer Universiade, held in his home country of Bulgaria. There he won three medals, bronze in the all-around and gold in the rings and parallel bars finals.

During his career, he competed at three Olympic Games from 1954 to 1964. At the 1960 Summer Olympics, he became the first Bulgarian to win an Olympic medal in any sport when he tied Takashi Ono for bronze on the rings. He was not expected to reach the final, and so his coach had been sent back to save money; another coach had to step in to lift Kapsazov onto the rings to begin his routine. Kapsazov had the necklace of his medal engraved with the names of his teammates in the order that they competed in the all-around.

== Post-gymnastics career and death ==
Kapsazov retired following the 1964 Olympic Games and became a coach. His students included Yordan Yovchev, a six-time Olympian.

He died 27 March 2017, aged 81.
