= Friz =

Distribution of the Friz family in Italy

The surname Friz derives from Fritz, diminutive of the German name Friederich (Frederick), originating from the Old Germanic Frithurik, composed of the prefix frithu ("peace", "friendship": Friede, in German) and the suffix rikia ("lord", "prince"), meaning "Lord of Peace", "The One who assures peace".

The surname is diffused in the Adige Valley in northern Italy. It is a German surname which established originally in the Region of Trentino on the comune di Garniga (town of Garniga).

== List of people with the name ==
- Anna Friz (born 1970), Canadian artist
- Clyde Nelson Friz (1867–1942), American architect
- Iryna Friz (born 1974), Ukrainian politician
- Manuela Friz (born 1978), Italian ice hockey player
- Max Friz (1883–1966), German engineer
- Peter Friz (born 1974), German mathematician

== See also ==
- Friz Freleng (1906–1995), American animator
- Friz Quadrata, glyphic serif typeface
