= 1959 European Men's Artistic Gymnastics Championships =

3rd European Men's Artistic Gymnastics Championships
- Location: Copenhagen, Denmark
- Start date: 18 October 1959
- End date: 19 October 1959

The 3rd European Men's Artistic Gymnastics Championships was held in Copenhagen, Denmark from 18–19 October 1959.

== Medalists ==
Event	Gold	Silver	Bronze
All-around	(Soviet Union) Yuri Titov	(Soviet Union) Pavel Stolbov	(West Germany) Philipp Fürst
Floor	(Switzerland) Ernst Fivian	(Sweden) William Thoresson	(Soviet Union) Yuri Titov
Pommel horse	(Soviet Union) Yuri Titov	(Finland) Eugen Ekman	(West Germany) Philipp Fürst
Rings	(Soviet Union) Yuri Titov	(Soviet Union) Pavel Stolbov	(Bulgaria) Velik Kapsazov (Finland) Otto Kestola
Vault	(Sweden) William Thoresson (Soviet Union) Yuri Titov	Not awarded	(Switzerland) Ernst Fivian
Parallel bars	(Soviet Union) Yuri Titov	(Czechoslovakia) Ferdinand Daniš	(Soviet Union) Pavel Stolbov
Horizontal bar	(Soviet Union) Pavel Stolbov	(Soviet Union) Yuri Titov	(Sweden) Jean Cronstedt (Finland) Otto Kestola

=== Medal table ===
Rank	Nation	Gold	Silver	Bronze	Total
1	Soviet Union (URS)	6	3	2	11
2	Sweden (SWE)	1	1	1	3
3	Switzerland (SUI)	1	0	1	2
4	Finland (FIN)	0	1	2	3
5	Czechoslovakia (TCH)	0	1	0	1
6	West Germany (FRG)	0	0	2	2
7	Bulgaria (BUL)	0	0	1	1
8	Hungary (HUN)	0	0	0	0
Totals (8 entries)		8	6	9	23
