= Richard Montpetit =

Canadian gymnast (born 1939)

- Full name: Richard R. Montpetit
- Born: 11 October 1939 (age 86) Verdun, Quebec, Canada

Gymnastics career
- Discipline: Men's artistic gymnastics
- Country represented: Canada
Medal record
Representing Canada
Pan American Games
Silver medal – second place	1959 Chicago	Team
Silver medal – second place	1959 Chicago	Pommel horse
Silver medal – second place	1959 Chicago	Vault
Silver medal – second place	1963 São Paulo	Team
Bronze medal – third place	1963 São Paulo	Pommel horse

Richard Montpetit (born 11 October 1939) is a Canadian gymnast. He competed at the 1960 Olympic Games.
