= Ladislav Pazdera =

Czech gymnast (1936–2022)

- Born: 6 December 1936 Radostice, Czechoslovakia
- Died: 19 December 2022 (aged 86)

Gymnastics career
- Discipline: Men's artistic gymnastics
- Country represented: Czechoslovakia

Ladislav Pazdera (6 December 1936 – 19 December 2022) was a Czech gymnast. He competed at the 1960 Summer Olympics and the 1964 Summer Olympics.

Pazdera died on 19 December 2022, at the age of 86.
