= Otto Kestola =

Finnish gymnast

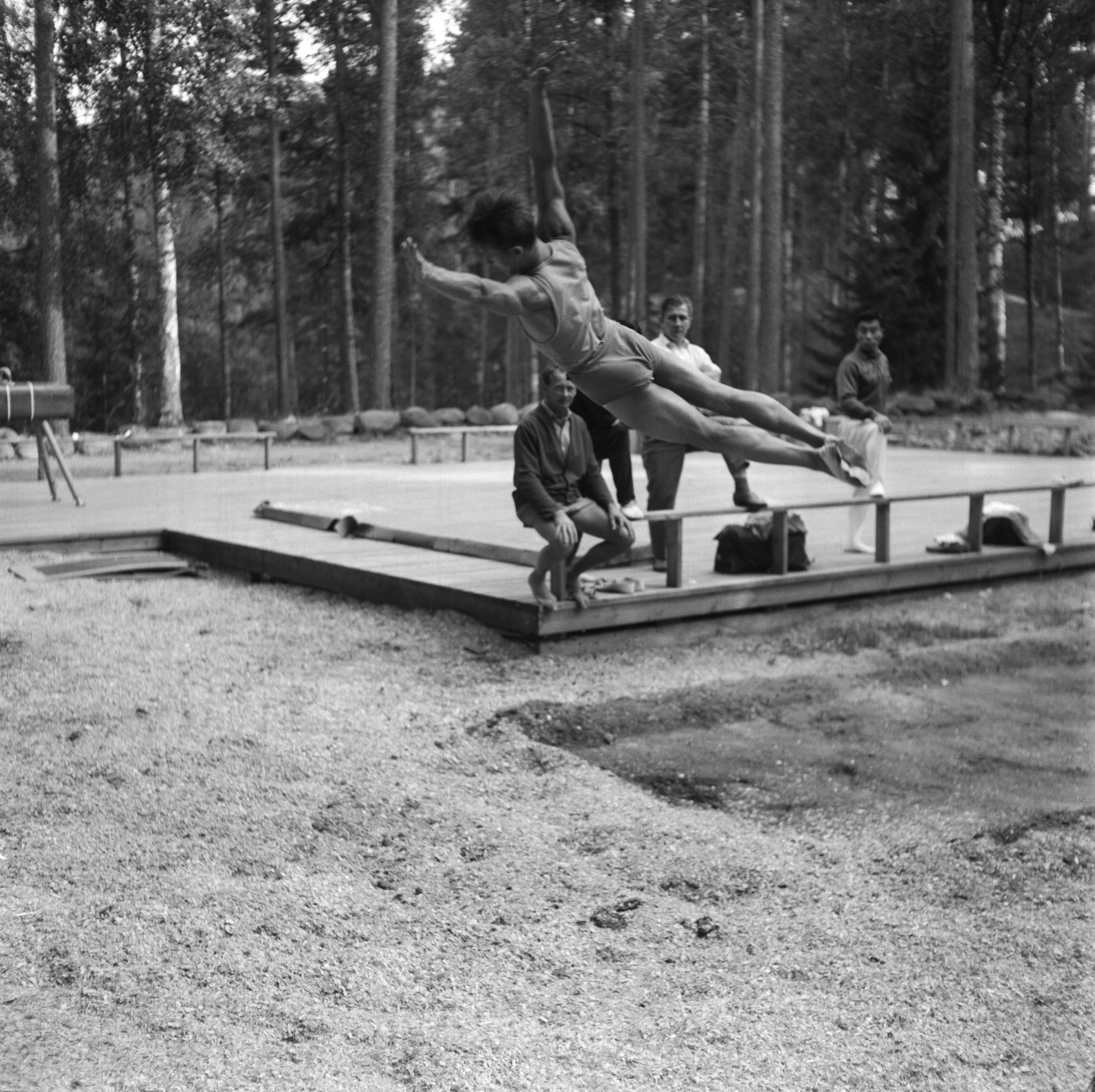
- Full name: Otto Jalmari Kestola
- Born: 20 May 1936 (age 90) Viipuri, Finland

Gymnastics career
- Discipline: Men's artistic gymnastics
- Country represented: Finland
Medal record
Representing Finland
European championships
Bronze medal – third place	1959 Copenhagen	Rings
Bronze medal – third place	1959 Copenhagen	Horizontal bar
Bronze medal – third place	1961 Luxembourg	Horizontal bar

Otto Jalmari Kestola (born 20 May 1936) is a Finnish gymnast. He competed at the 1960 Summer Olympics and the 1964 Summer Olympics.
