= Max Benker =

Swiss gymnast

- Born: 8 December 1932 Zürich, Switzerland
- Died: 7 March 2022 (aged 89) Männedorf, Switzerland
- Height: 1.68 m (5 ft 6 in)

Gymnastics career
- Discipline: Men's artistic gymnastics
- Country represented: Switzerland
- Club: Turnverein Alte Sektion Zürich
Medal record
Representing Switzerland
European championships
Silver medal – second place	1957 Paris	Pommel horse
Bronze medal – third place	1957 Paris	All-around
Bronze medal – third place	1957 Paris	Parallel bars

Max Benker (8 December 1932 – 7 March 2022) was a Swiss gymnast.

== Career ==
He competed in eight events at the 1960 Summer Olympics.
