= Rajmund Csányi =

Hungarian gymnast

- Born: 22 April 1936 (age 90) Bucharest, Kingdom of Romania
- Height: 1.72 m (5 ft 8 in)
- Relatives: Erika Csányi (daughter)

Gymnastics career
- Discipline: Men's artistic gymnastics
- Country represented: Hungary
- Club: Budapesti Honvéd Sportegyesület
Medal record
Representing Hungary
European championships
Silver medal – second place	1957 Paris	Vault
Silver medal – second place	1961 Luxembourg	Horizontal bar

Rajmund Csányi (born 22 April 1936) is a Hungarian gymnast. He competed at the 1960 Summer Olympics and the 1964 Summer Olympics.
