= Ivan Čaklec =

Croatian gymnast (1932–2018)

- Иван Чаклец
- Born: 5 August 1932 Varaždin, Yugoslavia
- Died: 30 March 2018 (aged 85) Zagreb, Croatia

Gymnastics career
- Discipline: Men's artistic gymnastics
- Country represented: (Socialist Federal Republic of Yugoslavia) Yugoslavia
Medal record
Representing Yugoslavia
European championships
Bronze medal – third place	1957 Paris	Pommel horse

Ivan Čaklec (5 August 1932 – 30 March 2018) was a Croatian gymnast. He competed at the 1952 Summer Olympics, the 1960 Summer Olympics and the 1964 Summer Olympics.
