= Siegfried Fülle =

East German gymnast

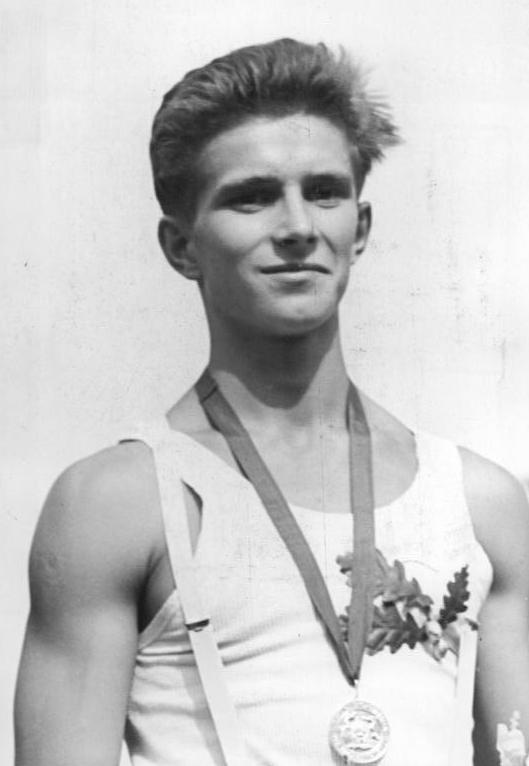
- Fülle in 1957

Personal information
- Born: 6 October 1939 (age 87) Greiz, Nazi Germany
- Height: 1.68 m (5 ft 6 in)

Gymnastics career
- Discipline: Men's artistic gymnastics
- Country represented: East Germany
- Club: SC DHfK Leipzig
Medal record
Men's artistic gymnastics
Representing Germany
Olympic Games
Bronze medal – third place	1964 Tokyo	Team
Representing East Germany
Olympic Games
Bronze medal – third place	1968 Mexico City	Team
World Championships
Bronze medal – third place	1966 Dortmund	Team

Siegfried Fülle (born 6 October 1939) is a German former gymnast. He competed at the 1960, 1964 and 1968 Summer Olympics in all artistic gymnastics events and won two bronze medals with the German team in 1964 and 1968. Individually, his best achievement was sharing seventh place on the vault in 1964. He won one more bronze medal in the team competition at the 1966 World Artistic Gymnastics Championships.
