= Nikolai Miligulo =

Belarusian artistic gymnast

- Николай Павлович Милигуло
- Full name: Nikolai Pavlovich Miligulo
- Born: 27 December 1936 (age 89) Minsk, Byelorussian SSR, Soviet Union
- Height: 1.76 m (5 ft 9 in)

Gymnastics career
- Discipline: Men's artistic gymnastics
- Country represented: Soviet Union
- Club: Sportivny Klub Vooruzhyonny Sily Minsk
Medal record
Men's artistic gymnastics
Representing Soviet Union
Olympic Games
Silver medal – second place	1960 Rome	Team

Nikolai Pavlovich Miligulo (Russian: Николай Павлович Милигуло; born 27 December 1936) is a retired artistic gymnast from Belarus. He competed at the 1960 Summer Olympics in all artistic gymnastics events and won a silver medal in the team allround competition. Individually his best result was 10th place on the pommel horse. He competed with one wrist slammed to the bones by the door of the car that brought him to the Olympic venue.

He retired around 1972 and worked as a gymnastics coach in Minsk, training such competitors as Nellie Kim. He served in the Soviet Army and retired as a lieutenant colonel. In 1991 he moved to Minneapolis, United States, and later brought his family there. His son Pavel is also a former artistic gymnast who competed internationally.
