= Ferdinand Daniš =

Czech gymnast (born 1929)

- Born: 7 January 1929 (age 97) Opatová, Czechoslovakia
- Height: 1.60 m (5 ft 3 in)

Gymnastics career
- Discipline: Men's artistic gymnastics
- Country represented: Czechoslovakia
- Club: Dukla Prague
Medal record
Representing Czechoslovakia
European Championships
Silver medal – second place	1959 Copenhagen	Parallel bars

Ferdinand Daniš (born 7 January 1929) is a Slovak gymnast. He competed at the 1952 Summer Olympics, the 1956 Summer Olympics and the 1960 Summer Olympics.

== Early life ==
Ferdinand Daniš was born on 7 January 1929 in a small village of Opatová, which was in 1966 incorporated into the nearby town of Lučenec. He was the second youngest of six sons. His father, Daniel, was a locksmith. His mother, Ema (née Molnár), was of Hungarian descent. The family spoke the Hungarian language at home. Soon after Ferdinand's birth, the family was moved to the Moravian town of Frýdlant nad Ostravicí, where young Ferdinand started training with the local branch of Sokol.

== Gymnastics career ==
During World War II, Daniš worked in a munitions factory. After the war, he followed his father's footsteps and apprenticed as a locksmith. However, he never practiced the craft, as in 1947, when he was aged 18, he became a part of the Czechoslovak national gymnastics team. In 1948, he won the national championship in floor exercise. In 1950, he began military service, eventually being transferred to the Army Athletic Club (ATK, later known as Dukla Prague) in 1951 after winning several army championships. He became the national champion in artistic gymnastics in the autumn of 1951.

For the next decade, Daniš competed on the international level. At the 1952 Olympics in Helsinki, he finished 5th in parallel bars (13th all-around) and 7th in the team competition. At the 1954 World Championships in Artistic Gymnastics in Rome, he competed despite a wrist injury. At the 1956 Olympics in Melbourne, he came close to winning a medal, finishing 4th in team competition, in spite of suffering from a knee injury. At the 1958 World Artistic Gymnastics Championships in Moscow, Daniš won a bronze medal with the Czechoslovak men's team. In 1959, he won a silver medal in parallel bars at the European Championships in Artistic Gymnastics in Copenhagen. At his final Olympics in 1960, in Rome, the Czechoslovak men's team, including Daniš, once again came close to winning a medal after placing 4th. He intended to compete in the 1964 Tokyo Olympics but was forced to withdraw and retire due to a shoulder dislocation and a subsequent unsuccessful elbow surgery. Daniš was the only internationally successful Slovak male gymnast until 1979, when Jozef Konečný won a medal at the European Championships.

== Post-gymnastics career ==
Following his retirement, he studied to be a gymnastics coach at the Charles University in Prague and later coached the Dukla Prague Team. In 1974, he became the coach of the elite Slovak army team Dukla Banská Bystrica and assistant coach for the Czechoslovak national team. He continued coaching well into his senior years, ending his active training career at SK Hradčany Prague at the age of 80. During his active sports career, he was repeatedly approached by the StB to act as an informant during international competitions, but he consistently refused.

As of 2024, Daniš and his wife resided in Prague.
