= Philipp Fürst =

German gymnast

- Born: 8 November 1936 Oppau, Ludwigshafen, Nazi Germany
- Died: 6 November 2014 (aged 77) Ludwigshafen, Germany

Gymnastics career
- Discipline: Men's artistic gymnastics
- Country represented: West Germany
- Gym: Turnerbund 1889 Oppau
Medal record
Men's artistic gymnastics
Representing Germany
Olympic Games
Bronze medal – third place	1964 Tokyo	Team
Representing West Germany
European Championships
Silver medal – second place	1961 Luxembourg	Pommel horse
Bronze medal – third place	1959 Copenhagen	All-around
Bronze medal – third place	1959 Copenhagen	Pommel horse

Philipp Fürst (8 November 1936 – 6 November 2014) was a German gymnast who competed in the 1960 Summer Olympics and in the 1964 Summer Olympics. He was born in Ludwigshafen-Oppau.
