= Jean Jaillard =

French gymnast

- Full name: Jean Lucien Jaillard
- Born: 6 October 1931 Carpentras, France
- Died: 12 November 2009 (aged 78) Antibes, France
- Height: 1.69 m (5 ft 7 in)

Gymnastics career
- Discipline: Men's artistic gymnastics
- Country represented: France
- Gym: Nice
Medal record
Men's artistic gymnastics
Representing France
Mediterranean Games
Silver medal – second place	1959 Beirut	Team
Bronze medal – third place	1959 Beirut	Pommel horse

Jean Lucien Jaillard (6 October 1931 – 12 November 2009) was a French gymnast. He competed in eight events at the 1960 Summer Olympics.

== Biography ==
He was crowned French champion in the individual all-around competition in 1959. He competed in the 1960 Summer Olympics, finishing 13th in the team all-around competition alongside Robert Caymaris and Michel Mathiot, among others.
