= Erwin Koppe =

German gymnast

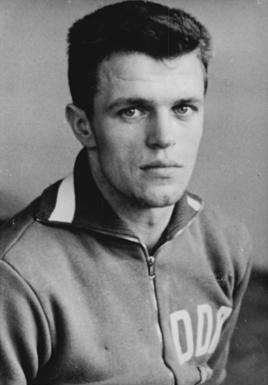
- Koppe in 1960

Personal information
- Born: 29 March 1938 (age 88) Rosenheim, Nazi Germany
- Height: 1.66 m (5 ft 5 in)

Gymnastics career
- Discipline: Men's artistic gymnastics
- Country represented: East Germany
- Club: SC DHfK Leipzig
Medal record
Men's artistic gymnastics
Representing Germany
Olympic Games
Bronze medal – third place	1964 Tokyo	Team
Representing East Germany
World Championships
Bronze medal – third place	1966 Dortmund	Team
European Championships
Bronze medal – third place	1965 Antwerp	Parallel bars

Erwin Koppe (born 29 March 1938) is a German former gymnast. He competed at the 1960 and 1964 Summer Olympics in all artistic gymnastics events and won a bronze medal with the German team in 1964. Individually, his best achievement was 14th place on the parallel bars in 1964. He won one more bronze team medal at the world championships in 1966.
