= Eugen Ekman =

Finnish artistic gymnast

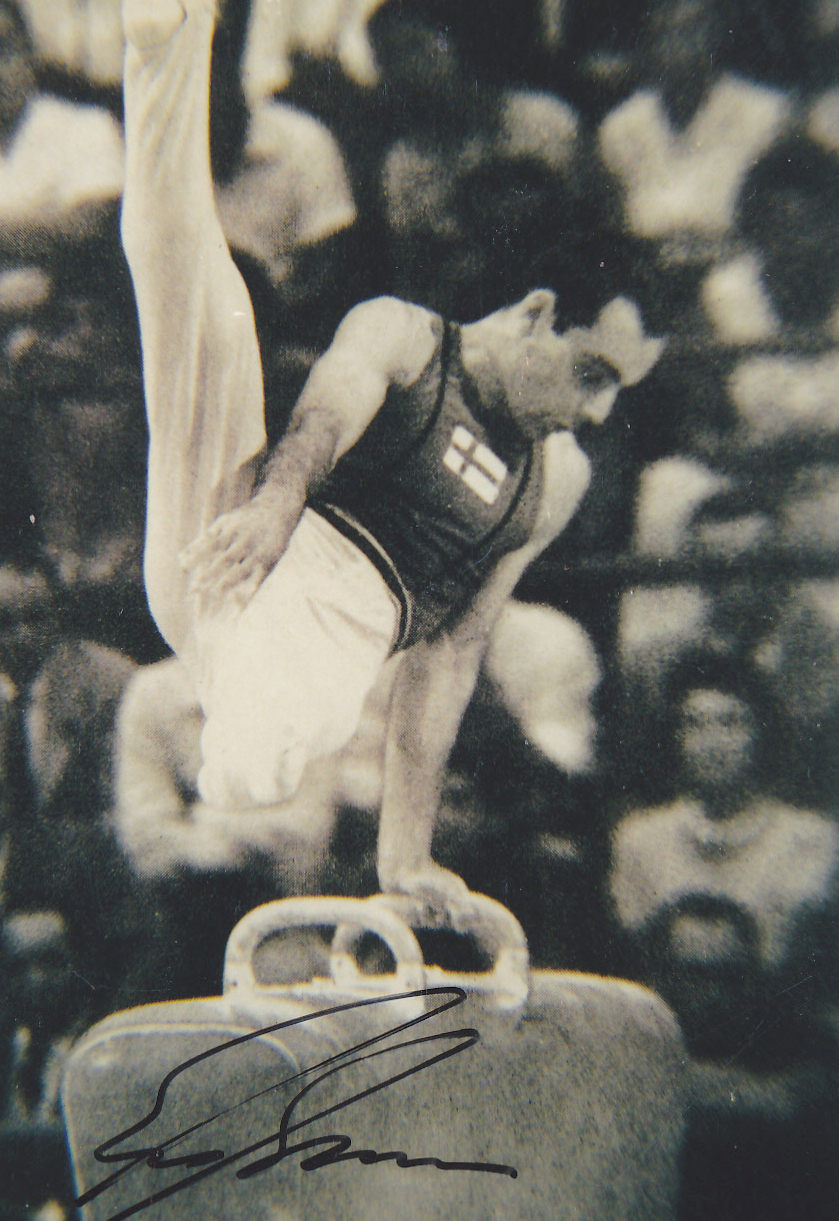
- Ekman at the 1960 Olympics

Personal information
- Born: 27 October 1937 (age 88) Vaasa, Finland
- Height: 1.78 m (5 ft 10 in)

Gymnastics career
- Discipline: Men's artistic gymnastics
- Country represented: Finland
- Club: Vasa IS
Medal record
Representing Finland
Olympic Games
Gold medal – first place	1960 Rome	Pommel horse
European Championships
Silver medal – second place	1959 Copenhagen	Pommel horse

Eugen Georg Oskar Ekman (born 27 October 1937) is a retired Finnish gymnast. He competed in all artistic gymnastics events at the 1960 and 1964 Olympics and won a gold medal in pommel horse in 1960. That year he finished sixth all-around, while in 1964 he served as the Olympic flag bearer for Finland at the opening ceremony.
