= Robert Caymaris =

French gymnast (1935–2025)

- Full name: Robert Antoine Caymaris
- Born: 27 August 1935 Birmendreïs, French Algeria
- Died: 30 December 2025 (aged 90) Marseille, France
- Height: 1.60 m (5 ft 3 in)

Gymnastics career
- Discipline: Men's artistic gymnastics
- Country represented: France
- Club: Puteaux
Medal record
Men's artistic gymnastics
Representing France
Mediterranean Games
Gold medal – first place	1959 Beirut	All-around
Silver medal – second place	1959 Beirut	Team
Silver medal – second place	1959 Beirut	Pommel horse
Bronze medal – third place	1959 Beirut	Floor
Bronze medal – third place	1959 Beirut	Parallel bars

Robert Caymaris (27 August 1935 – 30 December 2025) was a French gymnast. He competed in eight events at the 1960 Summer Olympics.

Caymaris died on 30 December 2025, at the age of 90.

== Biography ==
He was crowned French champion in the individual all-around competition in 1960. He competed in the 1960 Summer Olympics, finishing 13th in the team all-around competition alongside Jean Jaillard and Michel Mathiot, among others.
