= Ernst Fivian =

Swiss gymnast (1931–2021)

- Born: 12 August 1931 Thun, Switzerland
- Died: 15 December 2021 (aged 90) Lucerne, Switzerland
- Height: 1.62 m (5 ft 4 in)

Gymnastics career
- Discipline: Men's artistic gymnastics
- Country represented: Switzerland
Medal record
Men's artistic gymnastics
Representing Switzerland
Olympic Games
Silver medal – second place	1952 Helsinki	Team
European championships
Gold medal – first place	1959 Copenhagen	Floor exercise
Bronze medal – third place	1959 Copenhagen	Vault
Bronze medal – third place	1961 Luxembourg	Vault

Ernst Fivian (12 August 1931 – 15 December 2021) was a Swiss gymnast who competed in the 1952 and 1960 Summer Olympics. Fivian died on 15 December 2021, at the age of 90.
