= Josef Trmal =

Czech gymnast

- Born: 12 March 1932 (age 94) Prague, Czechoslovakia

Gymnastics career
- Discipline: Men's artistic gymnastics
- Country represented: Czechoslovakia

Josef Trmal (born 12 March 1932) is a Czech gymnast. He competed in eight events at the 1960 Summer Olympics.
