= Karlheinz Friedrich =

German gymnast

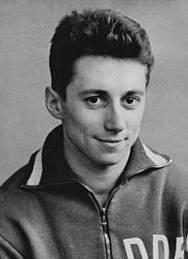
- Friedrich in 1960

Personal information
- Born: 31 July 1934 (age 92) Zwickau, Nazi Germany
- Height: 1.61 m (5 ft 3 in)

Gymnastics career
- Discipline: Men's artistic gymnastics
- Country represented: East Germany
- Club: SC DHfK Leipzig

Karlheinz Friedrich (born 31 July 1934) is a retired German gymnast. He competed at the 1960 Summer Olympics in all artistic gymnastics events and finished in seventh place with the German team. Individually, his best achievement was 31st place on the horizontal bar. In 1958, he won two national titles, on the floor and horizontal bar.
