= William Thoresson =

Swedish gymnast (1932–2026)

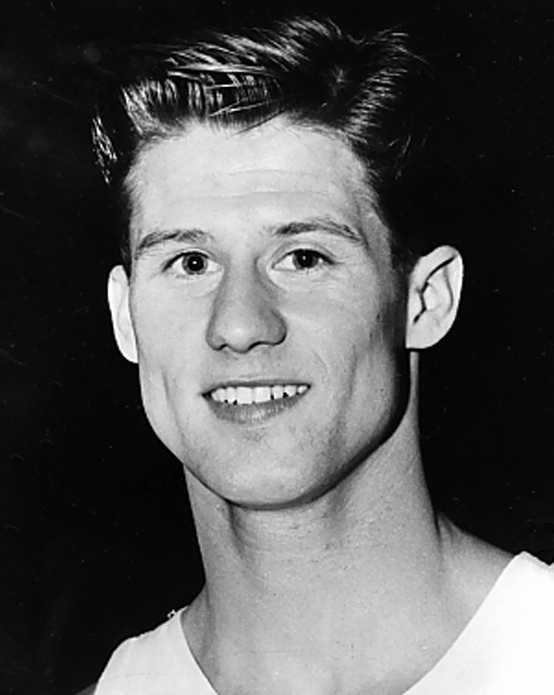
- Thoresson in the early 1950s

Personal information
- Born: 31 May 1932 Gothenburg, Sweden
- Died: 4 March 2026 (aged 93)
- Height: 1.71 m (5 ft 7 in)

Gymnastics career
- Discipline: Men's artistic gymnastics
- Country represented: Sweden
- Club: Göteborgs Turnförening
Medal record
Olympic Games
| Gold medal – first place | 1952 Helsinki | Floor exercise |
| Silver medal – second place | 1956 Melbourne | Floor exercise |
World Championships
| Bronze medal – third place | 1954 Rome | Floor exercise |
European championships
| Gold medal – first place | 1957 Paris | Floor exercise |
| Gold medal – first place | 1959 Copenhagen | Vault |
| Silver medal – second place | 1959 Copenhagen | Floor exercise |
| Bronze medal – third place | 1957 Paris | Vault |
| Bronze medal – third place | 1961 Luxembourg | Vault |

Karl Tore William Thoresson (31 May 1932 – 4 March 2026) was a Swedish gymnast. He competed at the 1952, 1956, 1960, and 1964 Olympics in all artistic gymnastics event and won two medals in the floor exercise: a gold in 1952 and a silver in 1956. He won another medal on the floor, a bronze, at the 1954 World Championships.

In 2001, Thoresson was inducted into the International Gymnastics Hall of Fame.

Thoresson died on 4 March 2026 at the age of 93. At the time of his death, he was Sweden's oldest gold medalist and remains the nation's first and still only Olympic gold medalist in gymnastics.
