= World Artistic Gymnastics Championships – Women's team all-around =

Women's events at the World Artistic Gymnastics Championships were first held in 1934 at the 10th World Championships. Only the all-around and team events were held. In 1950, at the 12th World Championships, the other apparatus events were added. It was not held in 1992, 1993, 1996, 2002, 2005, 2009, 2013, 2017, and 2021. In 1994, a separate team championships were held, apart from the individual events championships. This was the only year such a separation was made.

Three medals are awarded: gold for first place, silver for second place, and bronze for third place. Tie breakers have not been used in every year. In the event of a tie between two gymnasts, both names are listed, and the following position (second for a tie for first, third for a tie for second) is left empty because a medal was not awarded for that position. If three gymnastics tied for a position, the following two positions are left empty.

== Medalists ==
Bold numbers in brackets denotes record number of victories. Names with an asterisk (*) denote the team alternates who also received medals.

Year	Location	Gold	Silver	Bronze
1934	(Hungary) Budapest	Czechoslovakia; Maria Bajerová; Vlasta Děkanová; Vlasta Foltová; Eleonora Hajková; Vlasta Jarusková; Zdeňka Veřmiřovská	Hungary; Lenke Balkanyi; Judit Gamauf-Tóth; Anna Kael; Margit Kalocsai; Mária Munkácsi; Jenőné Varga	Poland; Helena Dylewska; Irena Mikulska; Zofia Pawlowska; Klara Sierońska; Janina Skirlińska; Erna Szymowa
1938	(Czechoslovakia) Prague	Czechoslovakia; Maria Bajerová; Vlasta Děkanová; Božena Dobešová; Vlasta Foltová; Eleonora Hajková; Vlasta Jarusková; Matylda Pálfyová; Zdeňka Veřmiřovská	Yugoslavia; Anica Haffner; Elca Kovačič; Marta Podpac; Marta Pustišek; Dušica Radivojević; Lidija Rupnik; Milena Sket; Jelica Vazzaz	Poland; Janina Luczynska; Marta Majowska; Wiesława Noskiewicz; Matylda Ossadnik; Janina Skirlińska; Urszula Stępińska; Urszula Wazs; Julia Wojciechowska
1942 and 1946	Not held due to World War II			
1950	(Switzerland) Basel	Sweden; Evy Berggren; Vanja Blomberg; Karin Lindberg; Gunnel Ljungström; Hjördis Nordin; Ann-Sofi Pettersson; Göta Pettersson; Ingrid Sandahl	France; Ginette Durand; Colette Hué; Madeleine Jouffroy; Alexandra Lemoine; Liliane Montagne; Christine Palau; Irène Pittelioen; Jeanette Vogelbacher	Italy; Renata Bianchi; Licia Macchini; Laura Micheli; Anna Monlarini; Marja Nutti; Elena Santoni; Liliana Scaricabarozzi; Lilia Torriani
1954	(Italy) Rome	Soviet Union; Nina Bocharova; Pelageya Danilova; Larisa Diriy; Maria Gorokhovskaya; Tamara Manina; Sofia Muratova; Galina Rudko; Galina Sharabidze	Hungary; Éva Banati; Ilona Bánhegyi Milanovits; Irén Daruházi-Karcsics; Erzsébet Gulyás-Köteles; Ágnes Keleti; Alice Kertész; Olga Lemhényi-Tass; Edit Perényi-Weckinger	Czechoslovakia; Eva Bosáková; Miroslava Brdíčková; Alena Chadimová; Věra Drazdíková; Zdena Lišková; Anna Marejková; Alena Reichová; Věra Vančurová
1958	(Soviet Union) Moscow	Soviet Union; Polina Astakhova; Raisa Borisova; Lidiya Kalinina; Larisa Latynina; Tamara Manina; Sofia Muratova	Czechoslovakia; Eva Bosáková; Věra Čáslavská; Anna Marejková; Matylda Matoušková; Ludmila Švédová; Adolfína Tkačíková	Romania; Atanasia Ionescu; Sonia Iovan; Elena Leușteanu; Elena Mărgărit; Elena Săcălici; Emilia Vătășoiu
1962	(Czechoslovakia) Prague	Soviet Union; Polina Astakhova; Lidiya Ivanova; Larisa Latynina; Tamara Manina; Sofia Muratova; Irina Pervushina	Czechoslovakia; Eva Bosáková; Věra Čáslavská; Libuše Cmíralová; Hana Růžičková; Ludmila Švédová; Adolfína Tkačíková	Japan; Ginko Abukawa; Keiko Ikeda; Taniko Nakamura; Kiyoko Ono; Toshiko Shirasu; Hiroko Tsuji
1966	(West Germany) Dortmund	Czechoslovakia; Věra Čáslavská; Jindra Košťálová; Marianna Krajčírová; Jana Kubičková; Bohumila Řimnáčová; Jaroslava Sedláčková	Soviet Union; Polina Astakhova; Zinaida Druzhinina; Olga Kharlova; Natalia Kuchinskaya; Larisa Latynina; Larisa Petrik	Japan; Yasuko Furuyama; Keiko Ikeda; Hiroko Ikenada; Mitsuko Kandori; Taniko Mitsukuri; Taki Shibuya
1970	(Socialist Federal Republic of Yugoslavia) Ljubljana	Soviet Union; Lyubov Burda; Olga Karasyova; Tamara Lazakovich; Larisa Petrik; Ludmilla Tourischeva; Zinaida Voronina	East Germany; Angelika Hellmann; Karin Janz; Marianne Noack; Richarda Schmeißer; Christine Schmitt; Erika Zuchold	Czechoslovakia; Soňa Brázdová; Ľubica Krásna; Hana Lišková; Marianna Némethová-Krajčírová; Bohumila Řimnáčová; Marcela Váchová
1974	(Bulgaria) Varna	Soviet Union; Nina Dronova; Nellie Kim; Olga Korbut; Elvira Saadi; Rusudan Sikharulidze; Ludmilla Tourischeva	East Germany; Irene Abel; Heike Gerisch; Angelika Hellmann; Bärbel Röhrich; Richarda Schmeißer; Annelore Zinke	Hungary; Ágnes Bánfai; Mónika Császár; Márta Egervári; Zsuzsa Matulai; Krisztina Medveczky; Zsuzsa Nagy
1978	(France) Strasbourg	Soviet Union; Svetlana Agapova; Tatiana Arzhannikova; Maria Filatova; Nellie Kim; Elena Mukhina; Natalia Shaposhnikova	Romania; Nadia Comăneci; Emilia Eberle; Anca Grigoraș; Marilena Neacșu; Teodora Ungureanu; Marilena Vlădărău	East Germany; Silvia Hindorff; Steffi Kräker; Heike Kunhardt; Karola Sube; Birgit Süß; Ute Wittwer
1979	(United States) Fort Worth	Romania; Nadia Comăneci; Rodica Dunca; Emilia Eberle; Melita Ruhn; Dumitrița Turner; Marilena Vlădărău	Soviet Union; Maria Filatova; Nellie Kim; Yelena Naimushina; Natalia Shaposhnikova; Natalia Tereschenko; Stella Zakharova	East Germany; Maxi Gnauck; Regina Grabolle; Silvia Hindorff; Steffi Kräker; Katharina Rensch; Karola Sube
1981	(Soviet Union) Moscow	Soviet Union; Olga Bicherova; Yelena Davydova; Maria Filatova; Natalia Ilienko; Elena Polevaya; Stella Zakharova	China; Chen Yongyan; Li Cuiling; Ma Yanhong; Wen Jia; Wu Jiani; Zhu Zheng	East Germany; Maxi Gnauck; Kerstin Jacobs; Steffi Kräker; Annett Lindner; Birgit Senff; Franka Voigt
1983	(Hungary) Budapest	Soviet Union; Olga Bicherova; Tatiana Frolova; Natalia Ilienko; Olga Mostepanova; Albina Shishova; Natalia Yurchenko	Romania; Lavinia Agache; Mirela Barbălată; Laura Cutina; Simona Renciu; Ecaterina Szabo; Mihaela Stănuleț	East Germany; Gabriele Fähnrich; Maxi Gnauck; Astrid Heese; Diana Morawe; Silvia Rau; Bettina Schieferdecker
1985	(Canada) Montreal	Soviet Union; Irina Baraksanova; Vera Kolesnikova; Olga Mostepanova; Oksana Omelianchik; Yelena Shushunova; Natalia Yurchenko	Romania; Laura Cutina; Eugenia Golea; Celestina Popa; Daniela Silivaș; Ecaterina Szabo; Camelia Voinea	East Germany; Gabriele Fähnrich; Jana Fuhrmann; Martina Jentsch; Dagmar Kersten; Ulrike Klotz; Jana Vogel
1987	(Netherlands) Rotterdam	Romania; Aurelia Dobre; Eugenia Golea; Celestina Popa; Daniela Silivaș; Ecaterina Szabo; Camelia Voinea	Soviet Union; Svetlana Baitova; Svetlana Boginskaya; Elena Gurova; Oksana Omelianchik; Yelena Shushunova; Tatiana Tuzhikova	East Germany; Gabriele Fähnrich; Astrid Heese; Martina Jentsch; Ulrike Klotz; Klaudia Rapp; Dörte Thümmler
1989	(West Germany) Stuttgart	Soviet Union; Svetlana Baitova; Svetlana Boginskaya; Olesya Dudnik; Natalia Lashchenova; Elena Sazonenkova; Olga Strazheva	Romania; Cristina Bontaș; Aurelia Dobre; Lăcrămioara Filip; Eugenia Popa; Gabriela Potorac; Daniela Silivaș	China; Chen Cuiting; Fan Di; Li Yan; Ma Ying; Wang Wenjing; Yang Bo
1991	(United States) Indianapolis	Soviet Union (11); Svetlana Boginskaya; Oksana Chusovitina; Rozalia Galiyeva; Tatiana Gutsu; Natalia Kalinina; Tatiana Lysenko	United States; Michelle Campi; Hilary Grivich; Shannon Miller; Betty Okino; Kerri Strug; Kim Zmeskal	Romania; Cristina Bontaș; Vanda Hădărean; Lavinia Miloșovici; Maria Neculiță; Mirela Pașca; Eugenia Popa
1992	(France) Paris	No team event held		
1993	(United Kingdom) Birmingham	No team event held		
1994 (Team)	(Germany) Dortmund	Romania; Simona Amânar; Gina Gogean; Nadia Hațegan; Ionela Loaieș; Daniela Mărănducă; Lavinia Miloșovici; Claudia Presăcan	United States; Amanda Borden; Amy Chow; Dominique Dawes; Larissa Fontaine; Shannon Miller; Jaycie Phelps; Kerri Strug	Russia; Oksana Fabrichnova; Elena Grosheva; Natalia Ivanova; Svetlana Khorkina; Dina Kochetkova; Elena Lebedeva; Evgenia Roschina
1995	(Japan) Sabae	Romania; Simona Amânar; Andreea Cacovean; Gina Gogean; Nadia Hațegan; Alexandra Marinescu; Lavinia Miloșovici; Claudia Presăcan	China; Ji Liya; Liu Xuan; Mao Yanling; Meng Fei; Mo Huilan; Qiao Ya; Ye Linlin	United States; Mary Beth Arnold; Theresa Kulikowski; Shannon Miller; Dominique Moceanu; Jaycie Phelps; Kerri Strug; Donielle Thompson
1996	(Puerto Rico) San Juan	No team event held		
1997	(Switzerland) Lausanne	Romania; Simona Amânar; Gina Gogean; Alexandra Marinescu; Claudia Presăcan; Mirela Țugurlan; Corina Ungureanu	Russia; Svetlana Bakhtina; Elena Dolgopolova; Elena Grosheva; Svetlana Khorkina; Yevgeniya Kuznetsova; Yelena Produnova	China; Bi Wenjing; Kui Yuanyuan; Liu Xuan; Meng Fei; Mo Huilan; Zhou Duan
1999	(China) Tianjin	Romania; Simona Amânar; Loredana Boboc; Andreea Isărescu; Maria Olaru; Andreea Răducan; Corina Ungureanu	Russia; Svetlana Khorkina; Anna Kovaliova; Yevgeniya Kuznetsova; Yekaterina Lobaznyuk; Yelena Produnova; Elena Zamolodchikova	Ukraine; Nataliya Horodniy; Viktoria Karpenko; Olha Rozshchupkina; Inha Shkarupa; Olha Teslenko; Tetiana Yarosh
2001	(Belgium) Ghent	Romania; Loredana Boboc; Sabina Cojocar; Carmen Ionescu; Andreea Răducan; Silvia Stroescu; Andreea Ulmeanu	Russia; Ludmila Ezhova; Svetlana Khorkina; Elena Zamolodchikova; Maria Zasypkina; Natalia Ziganshina	United States; Mohini Bhardwaj; Katie Heenan; Ashley Miles; Tasha Schwikert; Rachel Tidd; Tabitha Yim
2002	(Hungary) Debrecen	No team event held		
2003	(United States) Anaheim	United States; Terin Humphrey; Courtney Kupets; Chellsie Memmel; Carly Patterson; Tasha Schwikert; Hollie Vise	Romania; Oana Ban; Alexandra Eremia; Florica Leonida; Aura Andreea Munteanu; Cătălina Ponor; Monica Roșu	Australia; Belinda Archer; Jacqui Dunn; Danielle Kelly; Stephanie Moorhouse; Monette Russo; Allana Slater
2005	(Australia) Melbourne	No team event held		
2006	(Denmark) Aarhus	China; Cheng Fei; He Ning; Li Ya; Pang Panpan; Zhang Nan; Zhou Zhuoru	United States; Jana Bieger; Natasha Kelley; Nastia Liukin; Chellsie Memmel; Ashley Priess; Alicia Sacramone	Russia; Anna Grudko; Svetlana Klyukina; Polina Miller; Anna Pavlova; Kristina Pravdina; Elena Zamolodchikova
2007	(Germany) Stuttgart	United States; Ivana Hong; Shawn Johnson; Nastia Liukin; Samantha Peszek; Alicia Sacramone; Shayla Worley	China; Cheng Fei; He Ning; Jiang Yuyuan; Li Shanshan; Xiao Sha; Yang Yilin	Romania; Daniela Druncea; Andreea Grigore; Sandra Izbașa; Steliana Nistor; Cerasela Pătrașcu; Cătălina Ponor
2009	(United Kingdom) London	No team event held		
2010	(Netherlands) Rotterdam	Russia; Ksenia Afanasyeva; Anna Dementyeva; Ekaterina Kurbatova; Aliya Mustafina; Tatiana Nabieva; Ksenia Semenova	United States; Rebecca Bross; Mackenzie Caquatto; Mattie Larson; Aly Raisman; Alicia Sacramone; Bridget Sloan	China; Deng Linlin; He Kexin; Huang Qiushuang; Jiang Yuyuan; Sui Lu; Yang Yilin
2011	(Japan) Tokyo	United States; Gabby Douglas; McKayla Maroney; Aly Raisman; Alicia Sacramone; Sabrina Vega; Jordyn Wieber	Russia; Ksenia Afanasyeva; Yulia Belokobylskaya; Anna Dementyeva; Yulia Inshina; Viktoria Komova; Tatiana Nabieva	China; He Kexin; Huang Qiushuang; Jiang Yuyuan; Sui Lu; Tan Sixin; Yao Jinnan
2013	(Belgium) Antwerp	No team event held		
2014	(China) Nanning	United States; Alyssa Baumann; Simone Biles; Madison Desch*; Madison Kocian; Ashton Locklear; Kyla Ross; MyKayla Skinner	China; Bai Yawen; Chen Siyi; Huang Huidan; Shang Chunsong; Tan Jiaxin; Xie Yufen*; Yao Jinnan	Russia; Polina Fedorova*; Maria Kharenkova; Ekaterina Kramarenko; Aliya Mustafina; Tatiana Nabieva; Alla Sosnitskaya; Daria Spiridonova
2015	(United Kingdom) Glasgow	United States; Simone Biles; Gabby Douglas; Brenna Dowell; Madison Kocian; Maggie Nichols; Aly Raisman; MyKayla Skinner*	China; Chen Siyi; Fan Yilin; Mao Yi; Shang Chunsong; Tan Jiaxin; Wang Yan; Zhu Xiaofang*	Great Britain; Becky Downie; Ellie Downie; Charlie Fellows*; Claudia Fragapane; Ruby Harrold; Kelly Simm; Amy Tinkler
2017	(Canada) Montreal	No team event held		
2018	(Qatar) Doha	United States; Simone Biles; Kara Eaker; Morgan Hurd; Grace McCallum; Riley McCusker; Ragan Smith*	Russia; Lilia Akhaimova; Irina Alexeeva; Angelina Melnikova; Aliya Mustafina; Angelina Simakova; Daria Spiridonova*	China; Chen Yile; Du Siyu*; Liu Jinru; Liu Tingting; Luo Huan; Zhang Jin
2019	(Germany) Stuttgart	United States; Simone Biles; Jade Carey; Kara Eaker; Sunisa Lee; Grace McCallum; MyKayla Skinner*	Russia; Anastasia Agafonova; Lilia Akhaimova; Angelina Melnikova; Maria Paseka*; Aleksandra Shchekoldina; Daria Spiridonova	Italy; Desiree Carofiglio; Alice D'Amato; Asia D'Amato; Elisa Iorio; Martina Maggio*; Giorgia Villa
2021	(Japan) Kitakyushu	No team event held		
2022	(United Kingdom) Liverpool	United States; Skye Blakely; Jade Carey; Jordan Chiles; Shilese Jones; Leanne Wong; Lexi Zeiss*	Great Britain; Ondine Achampong; Georgia-Mae Fenton; Jennifer Gadirova; Jessica Gadirova; Alice Kinsella; Poppy-Grace Stickler*	Canada; Ellie Black; Laurie Denommée; Shallon Olsen*; Denelle Pedrick; Emma Spence; Sydney Turner
2023	(Belgium) Antwerp	United States; Simone Biles (5); Skye Blakely; Kayla DiCello*; Shilese Jones; Joscelyn Roberson; Leanne Wong	Brazil; Rebeca Andrade; Jade Barbosa; Lorrane Oliveira; Carolyne Pedro*; Flávia Saraiva; Júlia Soares	France; Marine Boyer; Lorette Charpy; Mélanie de Jesus dos Santos; Coline Devillard; Djenna Laroui*; Morgane Osyssek
2025	(Indonesia) Jakarta	No team event held		
2026	(Netherlands) Rotterdam	China; Du Siyu; Ke Qinqin; Qin Xinyi*; Qiu Qiyuan; Zhang Yihan; Zhang Qingying	United States; Skye Blakely; Charleigh Bullock; Dulcy Caylor; Reese Esponda; Claire Pease; Hezly Rivera*	Japan; Rina Kishi; Haruka Nakamura; Misa Nishiyama; Mana Okamura; Aiko Sugihara; Sara Yamaguchi*

== All-time medal count ==
Last updated after the 2026 World Championships.

Rank	Nation	Gold	Silver	Bronze	Total
1	(Soviet Union) Soviet Union	11	3	0	14
2	United States	9	5	2	16
3	Romania	7	5	3	15
4	Czechoslovakia	3	2	2	7
5	China	2	5	5	12
6	Russia	1	6	3	10
7	Sweden	1	0	0	1
8	East Germany	0	2	6	8
9	Hungary	0	2	1	3
10	France	0	1	1	2
10	(United Kingdom) Great Britain	0	1	1	2
12	Brazil	0	1	0	1
12	Yugoslavia	0	1	0	1
14	Japan	0	0	3	3
15	Italy	0	0	2	2
15	Poland	0	0	2	2
17	Australia	0	0	1	1
17	Canada	0	0	1	1
17	Ukraine	0	0	1	1
Totals (19 entries)		34	34	34	102
