= Perfect 10 (gymnastics) =

Gymnastics scoring on 10 point scale, changed in 2006

Nadia Comăneci poses beside the scoreboard that recorded her perfect 10 as 1.00 (with no Olympic precedent, the sign was incapable of displaying a 10.00).

A perfect 10 is a score of 10.000 for a single routine in artistic gymnastics, which was once thought to be unattainable—particularly at the Olympic Games—under the code of points set by the International Gymnastics Federation (FIG). It is generally recognized that the first person to score a perfect 10 at the Olympic Games was Romanian Nadia Comăneci, at the 1976 Games in Montreal. Other women who accomplished this feat at the Olympics include Nellie Kim, also in 1976, Mary Lou Retton in 1984, Daniela Silivaș and Yelena Shushunova in 1988, Lu Li and Lavinia Miloșovici in 1992. The first man to score a perfect 10 is considered to be Alexander Dityatin, at the 1980 Olympics in Moscow. (However, in the 1924 Paris Olympics, 22 men achieved a mark of 10 in rope-climbing, with Albert Séguin getting a second 10 in the sidehorse vault, events that are no longer part of artistic gymnastics.)

The FIG changed its code of points in 2006. There are now different top scores, all greater than 10, for the various events, based upon difficulty and artistic merit; there is no consistent perfect score. Execution scores are still out of 10, so the theoretical possibility exists for a gymnast to get a partial "perfect 10" (for execution) in addition to whatever maximum number they get for difficulty, but no such score has been awarded in decades.

== History ==
Men's artistic gymnastics had been an Olympic sport since the beginning of the modern games. Women's gymnastics were introduced as a single (team) event in the 1928 games, but were not expanded until the 1952 games, when there were seven events.

The International Federation of Gymnastics first drew up a code of points—for men—in 1949. Although the code was based on a maximum score of 10, until 1976 it was considered impossible to achieve a score of greater than 9.95, particularly at the Olympic Games. At the World Championships or Olympics, from when increased standardization of competition format and scoring (which was capped at a 10, a trend which would not be changed until 2006) was introduced at the 1952 Olympics, the very highest scores tended to be in the 9.400 – 9.600 range, and over the next few World and Olympic cycles through the 1950, 1960s, and 1970s, the top scores gradually got higher through the 9.700 and 9.800 range.

During the post-1952 era, a couple of very early scores, essentially extreme outliers, that came very close to the 10 mark were Armenian-Soviet Hrant Shahinyan's 9.950 on optional rings at the 1952 Olympics and Armenian-Soviet Albert Azaryan's 9.950, also on the optional still rings exercise, at the 1954 World Championships. On the men's side, these scores might not have been surpassed, or even equaled, at a World Championships or Olympics until 1980, as even scores of 9.900 were extremely rare and, in some Worlds and Olympics throughout the 1950s–1970s, scores of 9.900 seem to have been non-existent for the men.

One early example of a woman gymnast breaking 9.900 at a World Championships or Olympics in the post-1952 era was Soviet Larisa Latynina at the 1962 World Artistic Gymnastics Championships with a score of 9.933. Soviet Zinaida Druzhinina-Voronina also scored a 9.933, at the 1966 World Championships in the floor exercise finals.

Věra Čáslavská of Czechoslovakia was the first gymnast to achieve perfect 10s at a major competition in the post-1952 era, which she did twice at the 1967 European Championships, which were displayed on a manual scoreboard.

Prior to the 1976 Olympics in Montreal, Omega, the official timers, asked the International Olympic Committee how many digits it should allow on the electronic scoreboard, and were told that three digits would be sufficient, as a score of 10.00 would not be possible. On 18 July 1976, however, 14-year-old Romanian gymnast Nadia Comăneci scored a 10 on the uneven bars. Because the scoreboard was limited to three digits, it displayed her score as 1.00. This led to confusion, with even Comăneci unsure of what it meant, until the announcer informed the elated crowd that she had scored a perfect 10. An iconic press photograph (see above) shows a beaming Comăneci, arms upraised, beside the scoreboard. Comăneci scored a total of seven 10s at the 1976 Olympics—four on the uneven bars and three on the balance beam. Her main rival, the Soviet Union's Nelli Kim, scored two 10s in the same competition, in the vault and floor exercise. Comăneci's coach, Béla Károlyi, having defected to the United States in 1981, subsequently coached American Mary Lou Retton to gold at the 1984 Olympics in Los Angeles, where she scored 10s in the vault and floor exercise.

The first man to score a perfect 10 in Olympic competition was the Soviet Alexander Dityatin, in the vault, on the way to a record-breaking eight medals in the 1980 Olympics in Moscow. Among other men to achieve the score was Comăneci's future husband, Bart Conner, who achieved two 10s in the 1984 Summer Olympics in Los Angeles.

== Change in scoring ==
The code of points came under review as a result of separate incidents during the 2004 Summer Olympics in Athens, in which gymnasts were believed to have received excessively low scores. A new scoring system was introduced in 2006. It consists of an "A" score, based on the difficulty of elements, and a "B" score, based on artistic impression. While the B score still has a maximum of 10, it is only a part of the overall score.

The change had its share of critics. Béla Károlyi said of it: "It's crazy, terrible, the stupidest thing that ever happened to the sport of gymnastics.". Mary Lou Retton remarked: "It's hard to understand. I don't even understand it." Nadia Comăneci commented, "It's so hard to define sports like ours and we had something unique. The 10, it was ours first and now you give it away."

== List of perfect 10s ==
=== Olympics ===
==== Paris 1924 ====
- Twenty-two men in rope-climbing, with Albert Séguin getting a second 10.0 in the sidehorse vault

==== Montreal 1976 ====
===== Women =====
- Nadia Comăneci – team compulsory uneven bars, team optional uneven bars, team optional balance beam, all around uneven bars, all around balance beam, uneven bars event final, balance beam event final
- Nellie Kim – all around vault, floor exercise event final

(Olympic database; Women's individual results; women's all-around results; women's team results)

==== Moscow 1980 ====
===== Men =====
- Alexander Dityatin – all around vault
- Stoyan Deltchev – all around rings
- Aleksandr Tkachyov – all around high bar
- Michael Nikolay – all around pommel horse
- Zoltán Magyar – all around pommel horse, pommel horse event final

(Men's all-around results; men's individual event results)

===== Women =====
- Natalia Shaposhnikova – team compulsory vault
- Yelena Davydova – team optional floor exercise
- Emilia Eberle – team optional uneven bars
- Nadia Comăneci – team compulsory balance beam, all around uneven bars
- Melita Ruhn – team optional vault
- Maxi Gnauck – team optional uneven bars

==== Los Angeles 1984 ====
===== Men =====
- Peter Vidmar – team compulsory pommel horse, all around high bar, pommel horse event final
- Bart Conner – team optional parallel bars, parallel bars event final
- Mitch Gaylord – team compulsory parallel bars, team optional rings
- Tim Daggett – team optional high bar
- Li Ning – team compulsory pommel horse, team optional rings, floor exercise event final, pommel horse event final
- Tong Fei – team compulsory high bar, team optional rings, all around high bar, high bar event final
- Xu Zhiqiang – team compulsory high bar
- Lou Yun – team compulsory vault, team optional vault
- Li Xiaoping – team compulsory pommel horse
- Koji Gushiken – team compulsory high bar, all around vault, high bar event final
- Shinji Morisue – team compulsory high bar, team optional high bar, high bar event final
- Nobuyuki Kajitani – parallel bars event final

===== Women =====
- Ecaterina Szabo – team compulsory floor exercise, team optional vault, all around balance beam, floor exercise event final
- Simona Păucă – team optional balance beam
- Mary Lou Retton – team optional vault, all around vault, all around floor exercise
- Julianne McNamara – team optional uneven bars, team optional floor exercise, all around uneven bars, uneven bars event final, floor exercise event final
- Ma Yanhong – team optional uneven bars, all around uneven bars, uneven bars event final

(Men's results; women's results)

==== Seoul 1988 ====
===== Men =====
- Vladimir Artemov – team compulsory parallel bars, team optional high bar, all around parallel bars, all around high bar
- Valeri Liukin – team optional pommel horse, team optional parallel bars, all around high bar
- Dmitry Bilozerchev – team optional pommel horse, team optional rings, all around pommel horse, all around rings, all around vault, pommel horse event final
- Sergei Kharkov – team optional floor exercise
- Koichi Mizushima – team optional pommel horse
- Daisuke Nishikawa – team optional pommel horse
- Lubomir Geraskov – team optional pommel horse, pommel horse event final
- Zsolt Borkai – team optional pommel horse, pommel horse event final
- Holger Behrendt – team optional rings
- Sylvio Kroll – all around pommel horse
- György Guczoghy – all around pommel horse
- Csaba Fajkusz – all around high bar

===== Women =====
- Yelena Shushunova – team compulsory vault, team optional vault, team optional uneven bars, team optional floor exercise, all around vault, all around floor exercise, uneven bars event final
- Daniela Silivaș – team compulsory uneven bars, team compulsory floor exercise, team optionals uneven bars, team optionals balance beam, all around uneven bars, all around floor exercise, uneven bars event final
- Dagmar Kersten – team compulsory uneven bars, uneven bars event final

(Men's results; women's results)

==== Barcelona 1992 ====
===== Women =====
- Lu Li – uneven bars event final
- Lavinia Miloșovici – floor exercise event final

(Women's results)

=== Alternate Olympics ===
==== Olomouc 1984 ====
===== Men =====
- Dmitry Bilozerchev – team optional pommel horse, team optional rings, team optional parallel bars, team optional high bar, all around pommel horse, all around vault, all around parallel bars, all around high bar, pommel horse event final, rings event final, high bar event final
- Vladimir Artemov – team optional pommel horse, team optional rings, team optional vault, all around rings
- Yuri Balabanov – team compulsory rings, team optional high bar, all around parallel bars
- Holger Behrendt – team optional rings
- Sylvio Kroll – team compulsory vault, team optional vault, vault event final
- Roland Brückner – team optional floor exercise

===== Women =====
- Olga Mostepanova – team compulsory vault, team compulsory uneven bars, team compulsory balance beam, team optional vault, team optional balance beam, team optional floor exercise, all around vault, all around uneven bars, all around balance beam, all around floor exercise, balance beam event final, floor exercise event final
- Natalia Yurchenko – team compulsory uneven bars, team optional vault, all around vault, all around balance beam, uneven bars event final
- Yelena Shushunova – team optional vault
- Maxi Gnauck – team compulsory uneven bars, team optional vault, team optional uneven bars, all around floor exercise, uneven bars event final, floor exercise event final
- Gabriele Fähnrich – team compulsory uneven bars, uneven bars event final
- Hana Říčná – team optional balance beam, all around vault, all around uneven bars
- Martina Koblizkova – team optional vault
- Alena Dřevjaná – all around balance beam
- Franka Voigt – all around vault
- Boriana Stoyanova – all around uneven bars
- Miroslava Koblizkova – all around uneven bars

=== Goodwill Games ===
==== 1986 Goodwill Games ====
===== Women =====
- Yelena Shushunova – all around vault
- Oksana Omelianchik – all around floor exercise

==== 1990 Goodwill Games ====
===== Women =====
- Natalia Kalinina – all around floor exercise

===== Men =====
- Vitali Scherbo – vault 2, apparatus finals

=== World Championships ===
==== 1934 World Championships ====
- Eugen Mack – vault (perfect 20 out of 20)

==== 1950 World Championships ====
- Hans Eugster – compulsory parallel bars

==== 1981 World Championships ====
===== Men =====
- Aleksandr Tkachyov – team optional high bar, high bar event final
- Artur Akopyan – team optional high bar, high bar event final
- Tong Fei – team optional high bar, all around high bar
- Bogdan Makuts – all around high bar
- Sergio Saurez – all around high bar
- Li Xiaoping – pommel horse event final
- Michael Nikolay – pommel horse event final
- György Guczoghy – pommel horse event final
- Yuri Korolev – pommel horse event final
- Eberhard Gienger – high bar event final
- Kiyoshi Goto – high bar event final

===== Women =====
- Olga Bicherova – all around vault
- Maxi Gnauck – uneven bars event final

==== 1983 World Championships ====
===== Men =====
- Tong Fei – team compulsory parallel bars, floor exercise event final
- Li Ning – team optional rings, pommel horse event final
- Lou Yun – team optional parallel bars, parallel bars event final
- Dmitry Bilozerchev – team compulsory pommel horse, team optional pommel horse, all around floor exercise, all around vault, all around high bar, pommel horse event final, rings event final, high bar event final
- Vladimir Artemov – team optional parallel bars, parallel bars event final
- Shinji Morisue – team optional high bar
- György Guczoghy – all around pommel horse, pommel horse event final
- Alexander Pogorelov – all around rings
- Li Xiaoping – pommel horse event final
- Koji Gushiken – rings event final
- Koji Sotomura – rings event final

===== Women =====
- Natalia Yurchenko – team optional vault, team optional balance beam, all around vault, all around floor exercise
- Olga Mostepanova – team optional vault, all around vault, floor exercise event final
- Olga Bicherova – team optional vault
- Lavinia Agache – team optional uneven bars
- Ecaterina Szabo – team optional uneven bars, team optional floor exercise, all around vault, all around floor exercise, floor exercise event final
- Mirela Barbălată – team optional vault
- Maxi Gnauck – team optional uneven bars, all around uneven bars, uneven bars event final

==== 1985 World Championships ====
===== Men =====
- Tong Fei – team optional high bar

===== Women =====
- Olga Mostepanova – team compulsory balance beam
- Oksana Omelianchik – team optional floor exercise, floor exercise event final
- Yelena Shushunova – team optional floor exercise
- Gabriele Fähnrich – team compulsory uneven bars
- Daniela Silivaș – balance beam event final

==== 1987 World Championships ====
===== Men =====
- Xu Zhiqiang – team optional parallel bars
- Lou Yun – team optional floor exercise, floor exercise event final
- Sylvio Kroll – team optional vault, all around vault
- Yuri Korolev – all around vault

===== Women =====
- Aurelia Dobre – team optional vault, team optional balance beam, team optional floor exercise, all around vault, balance beam event final
- Daniela Silivaș – team compulsory balance beam, team compulsory floor exercise, team optional uneven bars, team optional floor exercise, floor exercise event final
- Camelia Voinea – team optional floor exercise
- Eugenia Golea – team optional vault
- Yelena Shushunova – team compulsory vault, team compulsory floor exercise, team optional floor exercise, all around floor exercise, floor exercise event final
- Dörte Thümmler – team optional uneven bars
- Gabriele Fähnrich – team optional uneven bars
- Fan Di – team optional uneven bars

==== 1989 World Championships ====
===== Men =====
- Valentin Mogilny – team optional pommel horse, all around pommel horse, pommel horse event final

===== Women =====
- Natalia Laschenova – team optional vault, all around vault, all around uneven bars
- Svetlana Boginskaya – team optional uneven bars, team optional floor exercise, all around vault, all around floor exercise, floor exercise event final
- Olesya Dudnik – team compulsory floor exercise, team optional vault, team optional balance beam
- Daniela Silivaș – team compulsory vault, team optional uneven bars, team optional floor exercise, uneven bars event final, floor exercise event final
- Cristina Bontaș – all around floor exercise
- Fan Di – uneven bars event final

==== 1991 World Championships ====
===== Women =====
- Kim Zmeskal – team optional vault
- Kim Gwang-Suk – uneven bars event final

=== European Championships ===
==== 1967 European Championships ====
===== Women =====
- Věra Čáslavská – balance beam event final, floor exercise event final

==== 1977 European Championships ====
===== Women =====
- Nadia Comăneci – balance beam event final

==== 1981 European Championships ====
===== Women =====
- Maxi Gnauck – uneven bars event final

==== 1985 European Championships ====
===== Women =====
- Yelena Shushunova – all around vault
- Oksana Omelianchik – floor exercise event final

==== 1987 European Championships ====
===== Women =====
- Daniela Silivaș – all around floor exercise, floor exercise event final

==== 1989 European Championships ====
===== Women =====
- Svetlana Boginskaya – all around floor exercise, floor exercise event final
- Olga Strazheva – all around uneven bars
- Daniela Silivaș – floor exercise event final

==== 1990 European Championships ====
===== Women =====
- Svetlana Boginskaya – all around vault, balance beam event final, floor exercise event final, vault event final.

=== U.S. National Championships ===
==== 1984 National Championships ====
===== Men =====
- Mitch Gaylord – all around optional high bar

===== Women =====
- Mary Lou Retton – all around optional vault, floor exercise event final

==== 1988 National Championships ====
===== Men =====
- Dan Hayden – all around compulsory parallel bars

==== 1990 National Championships ====
===== Men =====
- Bill Roth – all around optional high bar

==== 1992 National Championships ====
===== Women =====
- Kim Zmeskal – all around optional vault

==== 1998 National Championships ====
===== Men =====
- Brent Klaus – vault prelims

=== U.S. Olympic Trials ===
==== 1984 Olympic Trials ====
===== Men =====
- Peter Vidmar – optional high bar
- Mitch Gaylord – optional parallel bars
- Bart Conner – compulsory parallel bars

==== 1988 Olympic Trials ====
===== Women =====
- Rhonda Faehn – optional vault
- Joyce Wilborn – compulsory vault

==== 1992 Olympic Trials ====
===== Women =====
- Kim Zmeskal – optional vault

=== Moscow News/World Stars ===
==== 1979 Moscow News ====
===== Women =====
- Stella Zakharova – all around floor exercise

==== 1988 Moscow News ====
===== Women =====
- Yelena Shushunova – all around balance beam

==== 1989 Moscow News ====
===== Women =====
- Svetlana Boginskaya – all around vault
- Yulia Kut – uneven bars event final

==== 1991 World Stars ====
===== Men =====
- Sergey Kharkov – all around high bar
- Valeri Liukin – all around rings

==== 1992 World Stars ====
===== Women =====
- Tatiana Gutsu – all around uneven bars

=== American Cup ===
==== New York City 1976 ====
===== Women =====
- Nadia Comăneci – team optional vault, all around floor exercise

==== New York City 1980 ====
===== Men =====
- Kurt Thomas – all around high bar

==== New York City 1984 ====
===== Men =====
- Peter Vidmar – all around pommel horse

===== Women =====
- Mary Lou Retton – team optional floor exercise, all around vault
- Julianne McNamara – team optional uneven bars, all around uneven bars

==== Orlando 1991 ====
===== Women =====
- Kim Zmeskal – all around floor exercise
- Betty Okino – all around vault

==== Orlando 1992 ====
===== Men =====
- Scott Keswick – all around rings

=== European Cup ===
==== 1988 European Cup ====
===== Women =====
- Yelena Shevchenko – all around floor exercise

=== DTB Cup ===
==== 1984 DTB Cup ====
===== Women =====
- Maxi Gnauck – all around uneven bars, all around floor exercise, uneven bars event final, floor exercise event final

==== 1987 DTB Cup ====
===== Men =====
- Nicusor Pascu – all around high bar

==== 1988 DTB Cup ====
===== Men =====
- Marius Gherman – all around high bar

===== Women =====
- Svetlana Boginskaya – all around vault

==== 1989 DTB Cup ====
===== Women =====
- Natalia Lashchenova – all around vault

=== Cottbus International ===
==== 1984 Cottbus International ====
===== Women =====
- Maxi Gnauck – all around floor exercise
- Gabriele Fähnrich – all around uneven bars

==== 1985 Cottbus International ====
===== Women =====
- Maxi Gnauck – floor exercise event final

==== 1992 Cottbus International ====
===== Women =====
- Henrietta Ónodi – floor exercise event final

=== World Cup ===
==== 1979 World Cup ====
===== Women =====
- Nadia Comăneci – all around floor exercise, floor exercise event final
- Stella Zakharova – floor exercise event final

==== 1982 World Cup ====
===== Men =====
- Li Ning – all around high bar

==== 1986 World Cup ====
===== Women =====
- Yelena Shushunova – all around vault

=== Tokyo Cup ===
==== 1985 Tokyo Cup ====
===== Women =====
- Ulrike Klotz – floor exercise event final

==== 1988 Tokyo Cup ====
===== Women =====
- Daniela Silivaș – uneven bars event final, floor exercise event final
- Svetlana Ivanova – floor exercise event final

=== Chunichi Cup ===
==== 1976 Chunichi Cup ====
===== Women =====
- Nadia Comăneci – all around uneven bars, all around floor exercise

==== 1988 Chunichi Cup ====
===== Women =====
- Daniela Silivaș – floor exercise event final
- Svetlana Boginskaya – floor exercise event final

=== University Games ===
==== 1987 University Games ====
===== Women =====
- Yelena Shushunova – all around uneven bars, all around balance beam, all around floor exercise

== "Meta-perfect" scores ==
Although virtually hundreds of perfect scores of 10 were given at various levels of competition throughout the 1970s, 1980s, and 1990s, "meta-perfect" scores of 20, 30, or 40 were much, much more rare. A "meta-perfect" score would be an instance where a gymnast received multiple perfect scores of 10 throughout a competition on an apparatus (culminating in an official "meta-perfect" score of 20 in the Event Finals, depending upon the era and competition), or on every apparatus in a segment of a competition (which would result in an official "meta-perfect" score of 60 for a male gymnast or 40 for female gymnast, depending upon the era and competition).

Three possible scenarios in which to create a "meta-perfect score", that have occurred, would then be: 1) to achieve perfect 10s on every apparatus throughout a segment of a competition (Team Compulsories, Team Optionals, or All-Around) which would post an official "meta-perfect" score of either 60 for the men or 40 for the women, depending upon the era and competition; 2) to achieve perfect 10s on all performances on an apparatus throughout every segment of a competition (Team Compulsories, Optionals, All-around, and Event Finals), which would officially post a "meta-perfect" score of 20 in Event Finals, depending upon the era and competition; and 3) to achieve perfect 10s on all optionals performances on an apparatus (team optionals, all-around (if competed in), event finals), which might or might not post an official "meta-perfect" score, depending upon the competition and era – but this is a possibly necessary scenario to articulate because perfect scores of 10 were given much less often to compulsory routines than to optional routines, for a number of reasons. Olga Mostepanova seems to have been the only gymnast to do #1 at a major international competition. Svetlana Boginskaya, Nadia Comăneci, Maxi Gnauck, Olga Mostepanova, and Daniela Silivaș are women who have done this more than once. Dmitry Bilozerchev has done this probably more (4) times than any other man.

No score of "30" (listed several times below) would ever have been an officially posted score to designate "meta-perfection" on an apparatus. This is merely a designation of either 1) "meta-perfection" on an apparatus in both phases of the team competition (compulsories and optionals) as well as event finals, but not in the all-around, and this is worth articulating relative to listed "meta-perfect" scores of 40 because the gymnast in question might not have qualified to the all-around, therefore no opportunity to achieve a theoretical "meta-perfect" score of 40/40; OR 2) "meta-perfection" on all optionals performance on an apparatus (see scenario #3, above).

=== Olympics ===
==== 1976 Olympics ====
- Nadia Comăneci – 40/40 on Uneven Bars (every segment of the competition), 30/40 on Balance Beam (all optional routines – Team Optionals, All-Around, Event Finals)

==== 1984 Olympics ====
- Ma Yanhong – 30/40 on Uneven Bars (all optional routines – Team Optionals, All-Around, Event Finals)
- Julianne McNamara – 30/40 on Uneven Bars (all optional routines – Team Optionals, All-Around, Event Finals)
- Shinji Morisue – 30/30 on Horizontal Bar (Team Compulsories, Team Optionals, Event Finals; he did not compete in the all-around, so no opportunity to achieve 40/40, but he did get a 10 every time he competed on the apparatus)

==== 1988 Olympics ====
- Dmitry Bilozerchev – 30/40 on Pommel Horse (all optional routines – Team Optionals, All-Around, Event Finals)
- Daniela Silivaș – 40/40 on Uneven Bars (every segment of the competition)

=== Alternate Olympics ===
==== Olomouc 1984 ====
- Dmitry Bilozerchev – 30/40 on Pommel Horse (all optional routines – Team Optionals, All-Around, Event Finals), 30/40 on Horizontal Bar (all optional routines – Team Optionals, All-Around, Event Finals)
- Maxi Gnauck – 30/40 on Uneven Bars (in Team Compulsories, Team Optionals, and Event Finals; not a 10 in the All-Around, but a 10 in both segments of the team competition that carried over to Event Finals where Gnauck also got another 10 to create a "meta-perfect" score)
- Olga Mostepanova – 40/40 in the All-Around (all 4 apparatuses), 40/40 on Balance Beam (in every segment of the competition), 30/40 on Floor Exercise (all optional routines – Team Optionals, All-Around, Event Finals)

=== World Championships ===
==== 1934 Worlds ====
- Eugen Mack – 20/20 on Vault (exact details unknown but all of the highest scores in the competition were in the 18s and 19s, and his was the only 20)

==== 1981 Worlds ====
- Artur Akopyan – 20/30 on Horizontal Bar (both optional routines in Team Optionals and Event Finals – did not compete All-Around)
- Aleksandr Tkachyov (Tkachev) – 20/30 (both optional routines in Team Optionals and Event Finals – did not compete All-Around)

==== 1983 Worlds ====
- Vladimir Artemov – 20/30 on Parallel Bars (both optional routines – Team Optionals, Event Finals – did not compete All-Around)
- Dmitry Bilozerchev – 30/40 on Pommel Horse (not in the All-Around, but in both Team Compulsories and Team Optionals which carried over to Event Finals where he also got a 10, creating a "meta-perfect" score)
- Maxi Gnauck – 30/40 on Uneven Bars (all optional routines – Team Optionals, All-Around, Event Finals)
- Ekaterina Szabo – 30/40 on Floor Exercise (all optional routines – Team Optionals, All-Around, Event Finals)

==== 1987 Worlds ====
- Yelena Shushunova – 40/40 on Floor Exercise (in every segment of the competition)
- Daniela Silivaș – 30/40 on Floor Exercise (not in the All-Around, but in both Team Compulsories and Team Optionals which carried over to Event Finals where she got also got a 10, creating a "meta-perfect" score)

==== 1989 Worlds ====
- Svetlana Boginskaya – 30/40 on Floor Exercise (all optional routines – Team Optionals, All-Around, Event Finals)
- Valentin Mogilny – 30/40 on Pommel Horse (all optionals routines – Team Optionals, All-Around, Floor Exercise)

=== World Cup ===
==== 1979 World Cup ====
- Nadia Comăneci – 20/20 on Floor Exercise (All-Around and Event Finals)

=== European Championships ===
==== 1987 Europeans ====
- Daniela Silivaș – 20/20 on Floor Exercise (in both the All-Around and Event Finals)

==== 1989 Europeans ====
- Svetlana Boginskaya – 20/20 on Floor Exercise (in both the All-Around and Event Finals)

=== American Cup ===
==== 1976 American Cup ====
- Nadia Comăneci – 20/20 on Vault (in both the Preliminaries and All-Around)

==== 1984 American Cup ====
- Julianne McNamara – 20/20 on Uneven Bars (in both the Preliminaries and All-Around)

=== DTB Cup ===
==== 1984 DTB Cup ====
- Maxi Gnauck – 20/20 on Uneven Bars (All-Around and Event Finals), 20/20 on Floor Exercise (All-Around and Event Finals)

== See also ==
- List of highest historical scores in figure skating
