= 1985 European Women's Artistic Gymnastics Championships =

15th European Women's Artistic Gymnastics Championships
- Location: Helsinki, Finland
- Dates: 11–12 May 1985

The 15th European Women's Artistic Gymnastics Championships were held in Helsinki, Finland on 11-12 May 1985.

== Medalists ==
Event	Gold	Silver	Bronze
Seniors
All-Around	Elena Shushunova (URS)	Maxi Gnauck (GDR)	Oksana Omelianchik (URS)
Vault	Elena Shushunova (URS)	Ecaterina Szabo (ROU)	Dagmar Kersten (GDR)
Uneven Bars	Elena Shushunova (URS); Maxi Gnauck (GDR)		Oksana Omelianchik (URS)
Balance Beam	Oksana Omelianchik (URS)	Hana Říčná (TCH)	Elena Shushunova (URS)
Floor	Elena Shushunova (URS)	Oksana Omelianchik (URS)	Daniela Silivaș (ROU)

=== All-around ===
Rank	Gymnast	Vault (gymnastics)	Uneven bars	Balance beam	Floor (gymnastics)	Total
1st place, gold medalist(s)	Elena Shushunova (URS)	10.000	9.975	9.825	9.975	39.775
2nd place, silver medalist(s)	Maxi Gnauck (GDR)	9.825	9.950	9.875	9.950	39.600
3rd place, bronze medalist(s)	Oksana Omelianchik (URS)	9.800	9.925	9.900	9.900	39.525
4	Hana Říčná (TCH)	9.750	9.875	9.850	9.850	39.325
5	Ecaterina Szabo (ROU)	9.950	9.800	9.700	9.775	39.225
5	Dagmar Kersten (GDR)	9.925	9.750	9.775	9.775	39.225
7	Diana Dudeva (BUL)	9.800	9.875	9.725	9.725	39.125
8	Daniela Silivaș (ROU)	9.625	9.825	9.800	9.850	39.100
9	Alena Dřevjaná (TCH)	9.750	9.875	9.675	9.600	38.900
10	Natalia Yurchenko (URS)	9.300	9.850	9.825	9.850	38.825
11	Laura Cutina (ROU)	9.750	9.750	9.400	9.725	38.625
12	Gabriele Fähnrich (GDR)	9.550	9.850	9.200	9.675	38.275
13	Beáta Storczer (HUN)	9.425	9.450	9.525	9.850	38.250
14	Andrea Ladányi (HUN)	9.400	9.700	9.450	9.675	38.225
15	Bojanka Demireva (BUL)	9.675	9.750	8.950	9.800	38.175
16	Isabel Soria (ESP)	9.475	9.450	9.525	9.475	37.925
17	Elke Heine (FRG)	9.400	9.350	9.575	9.550	37.875
18	Zita Tóth (HUN)	9.550	9.225	9.475	9.475	37.725
19	Ana Manso (ESP)	9.450	9.575	9.425	8.950	37.400
20	Iveta Poloková (TCH)	9.075	9.675	8.975	9.650	37.375
21	Sandra Bösch (AUT)	9.425	8.775	9.550	9.250	37.000
22	Giulia Volpi (ITA)	9.325	8.950	9.075	9.600	36.950
23	Anja Wilhelm (FRG)	9.400	9.025	9.050	9.400	36.875
24	Michaela Pistacchi (ITA)	9.100	9.175	9.250	9.325	36.850
24	Natalie Seiler (SUI)	9.425	9.075	9.200	9.150	36.850
26	Silvia Topalova (BUL)	9.300	9.675	9.600	8.250	36.825
27	Lidia Castillejo (ESP)	9.400	9.425	8.650	8.300	36.775
28	Sandra Fei (ITA)	9.275	9.425	8.825	9.125	36.650
29	Carola Eenkhoorn (NED)	9.575	9.1	9.150	8.725	36.550
30	Bettina Ernst (SUI)	9.425	9.225	8.725	9.150	36.525

=== Vault Final ===
Rank	Gymnast	Total
1st place, gold medalist(s)	Elena Shushunova (URS)	19.975
2nd place, silver medalist(s)	Ecaterina Szabo (ROM)	19.900
3rd place, bronze medalist(s)	Dagmar Kersten (GDR)	19.875
4	Maxi Gnauck (GDR)	19.663
5	Oksana Omelianchik (URS)	19.650
6	Diana Dudeva (BUL)	19.600
7	Laura Cutina (ROM)	19.513
8	Alena Dřevjaná (TCH)	19.138

=== Uneven bars ===
Rank	Gymnast	Total
1st place, gold medalist(s)	Maxi Gnauck (GDR)	19.925
1st place, gold medalist(s)	Elena Shushunova (URS)	19.925
3rd place, bronze medalist(s)	Oksana Omelianchik (URS)	19.825
4	Hana Říčná (TCH)	19.775
5	Gabriele Fähnrich (GDR)	19.750
6	Diana Dudeva (BUL)	19.675
7	Daniela Silivaș (ROM)	19.625
8	Alena Dřevjaná (TCH)	19.500

=== Balance beam ===
Rank	Gymnast	Total
1st place, gold medalist(s)	Oksana Omelianchik (URS)	19.800
2nd place, silver medalist(s)	Hana Říčná (TCH)	19.775
3rd place, bronze medalist(s)	Elena Shushunova (URS)	19.750
4	Maxi Gnauck (GDR)	19.675
5	Daniela Silivaș (ROM)	19.625
6	Dagmar Kersten (GDR)	19.525
6	Ecaterina Szabo (ROM)	19.525
8	Diana Dudeva (BUL)	19.475

=== Floor exercise ===
Rank	Gymnast	Total
1st place, gold medalist(s)	Elena Shushunova (URS)	19.950
2nd place, silver medalist(s)	Oksana Omelianchik (URS)	19.900
3rd place, bronze medalist(s)	Daniela Silivaș (ROM)	19.750
4	Hana Říčná (TCH)	19.700
4	Maxi Gnauck (GDR)	19.700
6	Ecaterina Szabo (ROM)	19.675
7	Bojanka Demireva (BUL)	19.650
8	Beáta Storczer (HUN)	18.975
