= 1985 World Artistic Gymnastics Championships =

Gymnastics competition

- Location: Montreal, Canada

The 23rd Artistic Gymnastics World Championships were held in Montreal, Quebec, Canada, 3 to 10 November 1985.

== Results ==
Event	Gold	Silver	Bronze
Men
Team all-around	Soviet Union; Vladimir Artemov; Yuri Korolev; Valentin Mogilny; Yury Balabanov; Aleksei Tikhonkikh; Aleksandr Tumilovich	China; Li Ning; Xu Zhiqiang; Tong Fei; Lou Yun; Yang Yueshan; Zou Limin	East Germany; Sylvio Kroll; Holger Behrendt; Ulf Hoffmann; Jorg Hasse; Sven Tippelt; Holger Zeig
Individual all-around	(Soviet Union) Yuri Korolev	(Soviet Union) Vladimir Artemov	(East Germany) Sylvio Kroll
Floor	(China) Tong Fei	(Soviet Union) Yuri Korolev	(China) Li Ning
Pommel horse	(Soviet Union) Valentin Mogilny	(China) Li Ning	(Japan) Hiroyuki Konishi
Rings	(China) Li Ning (Soviet Union) Yuri Korolev	none awarded	(Japan) Kyoji Yamawaki (Soviet Union) Yury Balobanov
Vault	(Soviet Union) Yuri Korolev	(China) Lou Yun (France) Laurent Barbieri	none awarded
Parallel bars	(East Germany) Sylvio Kroll (Soviet Union) Valentin Mogilny	none awarded	(Japan) Koji Gushiken
Horizontal bar	(China) Tong Fei	(East Germany) Sylvio Kroll	(Japan) Mitsuaki Watanabe
Women
Team all-around	Soviet Union; Irina Baraksanova; Vera Kolesnikova; Olga Mostepanova; Oksana Omelianchik; Yelena Shushunova; Natalia Yurchenko	Romania; Laura Cutina; Eugenia Golea; Celestina Popa; Daniela Silivaș; Ecaterina Szabo; Camelia Voinea	East Germany; Gabriele Fähnrich; Jana Fuhrmann; Martina Jentsch; Dagmar Kersten; Ulrike Klotz; Jana Vogel
Individual all-around	(Soviet Union) Yelena Shushunova (Soviet Union) Oksana Omelianchik	none awarded	(East Germany) Dagmar Kersten
Vault	(Soviet Union) Yelena Shushunova	(Romania) Ecaterina Szabo	(East Germany) Dagmar Kersten
Uneven bars	(East Germany) Gabriele Fähnrich	(East Germany) Dagmar Kersten	(Czechoslovakia) Hana Říčná
Balance beam	(Romania) Daniela Silivaș	(Romania) Ecaterina Szabo	(Soviet Union) Yelena Shushunova
Floor	(Soviet Union) Oksana Omelianchik	(Soviet Union) Yelena Shushunova	(East Germany) Ulrike Klotz

== Men ==
=== Team Final ===
Rank	Team	Floor		Pommel Horse		Rings		Vault		Parallel Bars		Horizontal Bar		Total
Rank	Team	C	O	C	O	C	O	C	O	C	O	C	O	Total
Gold medal	Soviet Union	97.600		96.900		97.700		97.000		98.400		98.050		585.650
Gold medal	Vladimir Artemov	9.850	9.800	9.750	9.800	9.850	9.700	9.900	9.750	9.900	9.800	9.850	9.850	117.800
Gold medal	Yuri Korolev	9.800	9.850	9.650	9.650	9.900	9.800	9.750	9.850	9.850	9.850	9.700	9.850	117.500
Gold medal	Valentin Mogilny	9.900	9.800	9.800	9.900	9.750	9.650	9.800	9.300	9.850	9.950	9.450	9.950	117.100
Gold medal	Yury Balabanov	9.800	9.550	9.450	9.350	9.900	9.800	9.550	9.700	9.800	9.900	9.700	9.900	116.400
Gold medal	Aleksei Tikhonkikh	9.650	9.550	9.550	9.500	9.750	9.550	9.600	9.650	9.800	9.700	9.650	9.900	115.850
Gold medal	Aleksandr Tumilovich	9.700	9.450	9.600	9.700	9.800	9.550	9.700	9.250	9.800	9.500	9.700	9.800	115.550
Silver medal	China	97.700		96.600		96.850		96.450		97.300		97.700		582.600
Silver medal	Li Ning	9.800	9.900	9.600	9.900	9.900	9.800	9.500	9.800	9.800	9.350	9.700	9.900	116.950
Silver medal	Xu Zhiqiang	9.700	9.800	9.700	9.800	9.700	9.750	9.550	9.750	9.800	9.900	9.600	9.850	116.900
Silver medal	Tong Fei	9.800	9.900	9.400	9.800	9.450	9.700	9.150	9.750	9.800	9.750	9.800	10.000	116.300
Silver medal	Lou Yun	9.650	9.850	9.350	9.600	9.650	9.750	9.700	9.900	9.700	9.650	9.650	9.600	116.050
Silver medal	Yang Yueshan	9.600	9.700	9.600	9.750	9.600	9.550	9.500	9.550	9.650	9.650	9.500	9.700	115.350
Silver medal	Zhou Limin	9.500	9.700	9.450	8.900	9.400	9.400	9.300	9.700	9.800	9.450	9.650	9.850	114.100
Bronze medal	East Germany	97.250		95.650		97.050		97.350		96.450		97.300		581.050
Bronze medal	Sylvio Kroll	9.900	9.800	9.700	9.650	9.900	9.650	9.850	9.800	9.900	9.900	9.800	9.950	117.800
Bronze medal	Holger Behrendt	9.650	9.800	9.500	9.650	9.800	9.700	9.750	9.650	9.450	9.700	9.750	9.700	116.100
Bronze medal	Ulf Hoffmann	9.850	9.850	9.400	9.700	9.800	9.600	9.750	9.700	9.600	9.900	9.100	9.850	116.100
Bronze medal	Jorg Hasse	9.650	8.950	9.400	9.600	9.600	9.400	9.800	9.750	9.450	9.400	9.700	9.800	114.500
Bronze medal	Sven Tippelt	9.800	9.600	9.500	8.650	9.900	9.700	9.700	9.600	9.700	9.450	9.600	9.900	114.200
Bronze medal	Holger Zeig	9.600	9.350	9.250	9.550	9.550	9.250	9.650	9.550	9.300	9.350	9.550	9.600	113.550
4	Japan	96.700		96.100		97.050		96.400		96.550		96.900		579.700
4	Koji Gushiken	9.650	9.650	9.500	9.800	9.900	9.600	9.650	9.650	9.950	9.800	9.700	9.700	116.550
4	Koji Sotomura	9.700	9.600	9.500	9.700	9.850	9.550	9.750	9.250	9.800	9.600	9.800	9.550	115.650
4	Hiroyuki Konishi	9.550	9.500	9.700	9.850	9.600	9.600	9.650	9.600	9.550	9.500	9.650	9.850	115.600
4	Kyoji Yamawaki	9.650	9.800	9.450	9.600	9.800	9.800	9.700	9.750	9.400	9.650	9.600	9.200	115.400
4	Mitsuaki Watanabe	9.550	9.700	9.500	9.500	9.400	9.400	9.600	9.550	9.350	9.550	9.800	9.800	114.700
4	Shigemitsu Kondo	9.800	9.600	9.400	8.700	9.750	9.600	9.600	9.500	9.750	9.450	9.500	9.450	114.100

=== All-around ===
Rank	Gymnast	Floor (gymnastics)	Pommel horse	Rings (gymnastics)	Vault (gymnastics)	Parallel bars	Horizontal bar	Score	Prelim score	Total
1st place, gold medalist(s)	Yuri Korolev (URS)	9.900	9.700	9.850	9.900	9.850	9.900	59.150	58.750	117.850
2nd place, silver medalist(s)	Vladimir Artemov (URS)	9.750	9.850	9.700	9.850	9.750	9.750	58.650	58.900	117.550
3rd place, bronze medalist(s)	Sylvio Kroll (GDR)	9.650	9.750	9.600	9.850	9.650	9.900	58.400	58.900	117.300
4	Xu Zhiqiang (CHN)	9.600	9.800	9.850	9.850	9.900	9.800	58.800	58.450	117.250
5	Li Ning (CHN)	9.900	9.350	9.800	9.900	9.850	9.900	58.700	58.475	117.175
6	Valentin Mogilny (URS)	9.800	9.900	9.700	9.850	9.400	9.950	58.600	58.550	117.150
7	Tong Fei (CHN)	9.900	9.800	9.700	9.800	9.850	9.900	58.950	58.150	117.100
8	Holger Behrendt (GDR)	9.850	9.650	9.700	9.750	9.650	9.700	58.300	58.050	116.350
9	György Guczoghy (HUN)	9.550	9.800	9.650	9.800	9.800	9.650	58.250	57.950	116.200
10	Ulf Hoffmann (GDR)	9.850	9.700	9.400	9.800	9.800	9.400	57.950	58.050	116.000
11	Koji Sotomura (JPN)	9.600	9.700	9.700	9.500	9.650	9.550	57.700	57.825	115.525
12	Hiroyuki Konishi (JPN)	9.350	9.650	9.400	9.800	9.700	9.600	57.500	57.800	115.300
13	Koji Gushiken (JPN)	9.550	9.400	9.600	9.000	9.800	9.650	57.000	58.275	115.275
14	Brad Peters (CAN)	9.600	9.700	9.550	9.750	9.500	9.550	57.650	57.050	114.700
15	Boris Preti (ITA)	9.650	9.400	9.650	9.650	9.300	9.750	57.400	57.250	114.650
16	Zsolt Borkai (HUN)	9.100	9.650	9.600	9.850	9.700	9.200	57.100	57.525	114.625
17	Johan Jonasson (SWE)	9.600	9.650	9.600	9.600	9.600	9.650	57.700	56.800	114.500
18	Bernhard Simmelbauer (FRG)	9.500	9.600	9.500	9.650	9.500	9.700	57.450	56.975	114.425
19	Philippe Chartrand (CAN)	9.700	9.300	9.400	9.800	9.550	9.850	57.600	56.375	113.975
20	Jean-Luc Cairon (FRA)	9.550	9.700	9.450	9.750	9.500	9.550	57.500	56.450	113.950
21	Borislav Hutov (BUL)	9.650	9.350	9.450	9.600	9.600	9.750	57.400	56.350	113.750
22	Scott Johnson (USA)	9.500	9.500	9.600	9.750	9.650	9.800	57.800	55.925	113.725
23	Laurent Barbieri (FRA)	9.800	8.800	9.350	9.750	9.300	9.750	56.750	56.900	113.650
24	Markus Lehmann (SUI)	9.600	9.300	9.600	9.750	9.600	9.600	57.450	56.150	113.600
25	Tim Daggett (USA)	9.600	9.800	9.400	9.600	8.850	8.950	56.200	57.325	113.525
26	Raul Menendez (CUB)	9.500	9.500	9.300	9.450	9.550	9.850	57.150	56.350	113.500
26	Andreas Japtok (FRG)	9.350	9.200	9.400	9.650	9.550	9.700	56.850	56.650	113.500
28	Brian Babcock (USA)	9.450	9.650	9.050	9.200	9.650	9.600	56.600	56.400	113.000
28	Antonio Trecate (ITA)	9.500	9.350	9.400	9.500	9.000	9.700	56.450	56.550	113.000
30	Daniel Winkler (FRG)	9.500	8.900	9.500	9.550	9.200	9.650	56.300	56.650	112.950
31	Csaba Fajkusz (HUN)	9.600	8.950	9.050	9.700	9.400	9.850	56.550	56.300	112.850
32	Emilian Nicula (ROU)	9.600	9.300	9.400	9.650	9.400	9.100	56.450	56.075	112.525
33	Joo Young Sam (KOR)	9.650	9.500	9.050	9.500	9.200	9.400	56.300	56.100	112.400
33	Jesus Rivera (CUB)	9.800	9.400	9.000	9.800	8.550	9.750	56.300	56.100	112.400
35	Mario Castro (CUB)	9.100	9.350	9.450	9.750	9.650	8.550	55.850	56.175	112.025
36	Miguel Rubio (ESP)	9.400	9.450	8.500	9.500	9.350	9.850	56.050	55.900	111.950

=== Floor Exercise ===
Rank	Gymnast	Score	Prelim score	Total
1st place, gold medalist(s)	Tong Fei (CHN)	9.900	9.850	19.750
2nd place, silver medalist(s)	Yuri Korolev (URS)	9.900	9.825	19.725
3rd place, bronze medalist(s)	Li Ning (CHN)	9.800	9.850	19.650
4	Sylvio Kroll (GDR)	9.750	9.850	19.600
4	Valentin Mogilny (URS)	9.750	9.850	19.600
6	Kyoji Yamawaki (JPN)	9.700	9.725	19.425
7	Philippe Vatuone (FRA)	9.650	9.725	19.375
8	Ulf Hoffmann (GDR)	9.500	9.850	19.350

=== Pommel Horse ===
Rank	Gymnast	Score	Prelim score	Total
1st place, gold medalist(s)	Valentin Mogilny (URS)	9.900	9.850	19.750
2nd place, silver medalist(s)	Li Ning (CHN)	9.900	9.750	19.650
3rd place, bronze medalist(s)	Hiroyuki Konishi (JPN)	9.850	9.775	19.625
4	Vladimir Artemov (URS)	9.800	9.775	19.575
5	György Guczoghy (HUN)	9.850	9.700	19.550
6	Sylvio Kroll (GDR)	9.800	9.675	19.475
7	Xu Zhiqiang (CHN)	9.600	9.750	19.350
8	Koji Gushiken (JPN)	9.650	9.650	19.300

=== Rings ===
Rank	Gymnast	Score	Prelim score	Total
1st place, gold medalist(s)	Yuri Korolev (URS)	9.900	9.850	19.750
1st place, gold medalist(s)	Li Ning (CHN)	9.900	9.850	19.750
3rd place, bronze medalist(s)	Yury Balabanov (URS)	9.750	9.850	19.600
3rd place, bronze medalist(s)	Kyoji Yamawaki (JPN)	9.800	9.800	19.600
5	Andreas Aguilar (FRG)	9.800	9.775	19.575
6	Sven Tippelt (GDR)	9.700	9.800	19.500
7	György Guczoghy (HUN)	9.700	9.750	19.450
8	Sylvio Kroll (GDR)	9.600	9.775	19.375

=== Vault ===
Rank	Gymnast	Score	Prelim score	Total
1st place, gold medalist(s)	Yuri Korolev (URS)	9.825	9.800	19.625
2nd place, silver medalist(s)	Lou Yun (CHN)	9.775	9.800	19.575
2nd place, silver medalist(s)	Laurent Barbieri (FRA)	9.775	9.800	19.575
4	Vladimir Artemov (URS)	9.725	9.825	19.550
5	Israel Sanchez (CUB)	9.725	9.800	19.525
6	Zsolt Borkai (HUN)	9.750	9.750	19.500
7	Jorg Hasse (GDR)	9.700	9.775	19.475
8	Sylvio Kroll (GDR)	9.650	9.825	19.475

=== Parallel Bars ===
Rank	Gymnast	Score	Prelim score	Total
1st place, gold medalist(s)	Sylvio Kroll (GDR)	9.900	9.900	19.800
1st place, gold medalist(s)	Valentin Mogilny (URS)	9.900	9.900	19.800
3rd place, bronze medalist(s)	Koji Gushiken (JPN)	9.900	9.875	19.775
4	Vladimir Artemov (URS)	9.900	9.850	19.750
5	Xu Zhiqiang (CHN)	9.800	9.850	19.650
6	Tong Fei (CHN)	9.800	9.775	19.575
7	Ulf Hoffmann (GDR)	9.800	9.750	19.550
8	Koji Sotomura (JPN)	9.700	9.700	19.400

=== Horizontal Bar ===
Rank	Gymnast	Score	Prelim score	Total
1st place, gold medalist(s)	Tong Fei (CHN)	9.950	9.900	19.850
2nd place, silver medalist(s)	Sylvio Kroll (GDR)	9.850	9.875	19.725
3rd place, bronze medalist(s)	Mitsuaki Watanabe (JPN)	9.900	9.800	19.700
4	Li Ning (CHN)	9.800	9.800	19.600
5	Vladimir Artemov (URS)	9.700	9.850	19.550
5	Hiroyuki Konishi (JPN)	9.800	9.750	19.550
7	Jorg Hasse (GDR)	9.400	9.750	19.150
8	Yury Balabanov (URS)	8.600	9.800	18.400

== Women ==
=== Team Final ===
Rank	Team	Vault (gymnastics)		Uneven bars		Balance beam		Floor (gymnastics)		Total
Rank	Team	C	O	C	O	C	O	C	O	Total
1st place, gold medalist(s)	Soviet Union	97.875		97.825		98.900		98.775		393.375
1st place, gold medalist(s)	Natalia Yurchenko	9.800	9.875	9.400	9.950	9.950	9.900	9.850	9.925	78.650
1st place, gold medalist(s)	Olga Mostepanova	9.600	9.850	9.875	9.900	10.000	9.625	9.800	9.925	78.575
1st place, gold medalist(s)	Irina Baraksanova	9.575	9.875	9.800	9.900	9.975	9.775	9.750	9.850	78.500
1st place, gold medalist(s)	Oksana Omelianchik	9.625	9.900	9.800	9.250	9.900	9.900	9.800	10.000	78.175
1st place, gold medalist(s)	Yelena Shushunova	9.875	9.900	8.725	9.850	9.900	9.900	9.875	10.000	78.025
1st place, gold medalist(s)	Vera Kolesnikova	9.525	9.800	9.750	9.600	9.250	9.700	9.675	9.750	77.050
2nd place, silver medalist(s)	Romania	96.600		97.400		97.275		97.575		388.850
2nd place, silver medalist(s)	Ecaterina Szabo	9.650	9.900	9.900	9.825	9.850	9.950	9.775	9.900	78.750
2nd place, silver medalist(s)	Camelia Voinea	9.575	9.800	9.850	9.725	9.550	9.450	9.700	9.800	77.450
2nd place, silver medalist(s)	Daniela Silivaș	9.475	9.750	9.800	9.125	9.725	9.900	9.750	9.875	77.400
2nd place, silver medalist(s)	Celestina Popa	9.425	9.800	9.750	9.675	9.550	9.750	9.575	9.775	77.300
2nd place, silver medalist(s)	Laura Cutina	9.525	9.700	9.725	9.600	9.600	9.700	9.700	9.550	77.100
2nd place, silver medalist(s)	Eugenia Golea	9.350	9.700	9.625	9.550	9.550	9.700	9.500	9.725	76.700
3rd place, bronze medalist(s)	East Germany	96.575		98.075		95.325		97.525		387.500
3rd place, bronze medalist(s)	Dagmar Kersten	9.575	9.875	9.900	9.825	9.775	9.800	9.725	9.775	78.250
3rd place, bronze medalist(s)	Gabriele Fähnrich	9.550	9.750	10.000	9.975	9.325	9.700	9.700	9.775	77.775
3rd place, bronze medalist(s)	Ulrike Klotz	9.600	8.800	9.825	9.725	9.625	9.650	9.775	9.975	76.975
3rd place, bronze medalist(s)	Jana Fuhrmann	9.525	9.775	9.800	9.650	9.150	9.625	9.600	9.775	76.900
3rd place, bronze medalist(s)	Jana Vogel	9.400	9.725	9.725	9.600	9.575	9.100	9.525	9.675	76.325
3rd place, bronze medalist(s)	Martina Jentsch	9.500	9.700	9.575	9.650	8.900	9.075	9.625	9.800	75.825
4	Bulgaria	96.075		96.675		93.975		95.925		382.650
4	Boriana Stoyanova	9.725	9.675	9.675	9.650	9.625	9.100	9.625	9.700	76.775
4	Diana Dudeva	9.625	9.650	9.700	9.700	9.525	9.100	9.625	9.775	76.700
4	Bojanka Demireva	9.650	9.725	9.700	9.700	9.600	9.025	9.350	9.700	76.450
4	Pepa Kazakova	9.350	9.500	9.450	9.400	9.700	9.750	9.425	9.625	76.200
4	Silvia Topalova	9.475	9.550	9.775	9.625	9.275	8.450	9.475	9.600	75.225
4	Maria Kartalova	9.450	9.550	9.575	9.575	9.500	9.050	9.375	8.975	75.050

=== All-around ===
Rank	Gymnast	Vault (gymnastics)	Uneven bars	Balance beam	Floor (gymnastics)	Score	Prelim score	Total
1st place, gold medalist(s)	Oksana Omelianchik (URS)	9.900	9.800	9.900	9.975	39.575	39.088	78.663
1st place, gold medalist(s)	Yelena Shushunova (URS)	9.875	9.900	9.900	9.975	39.650	39.013	78.663
3rd place, bronze medalist(s)	Dagmar Kersten (GDR)	9.775	9.900	9.900	9.625	39.200	39.125	78.325
4	Gabriele Fähnrich (GDR)	9.675	9.975	9.775	9.775	39.200	38.888	78.088
5	Ecaterina Szabo (ROU)	9.850	9.875	9.125	9.850	38.700	39.375	78.075
6	Natalia Yurchenko (URS)	9.875	9.125	9.800	9.750	38.550	39.325	77.875
7	Daniela Silivaș (ROU)	9.750	9.625	9.850	9.900	39.125	38.700	77.825
8	Hana Říčná (TCH)	9.575	9.725	9.750	9.775	38.825	38.238	77.063
9	Camelia Voinea (ROU)	9.800	9.700	9.025	9.800	38.325	38.725	77.050
10	Iveta Poloková (TCH)	9.550	9.675	9.725	9.750	38.700	38.300	77.000
11	Boriana Stoyanova (BUL)	9.600	9.700	9.550	9.525	38.375	38.388	76.763
12	Bojanka Demireva (BUL)	9.725	9.750	9.600	9.450	38.525	38.225	76.750
13	Ulrike Klotz (GDR)	9.650	9.825	8.950	9.825	38.250	38.488	76.738
14	Sabrina Mar (USA)	9.600	9.750	9.350	9.650	38.350	38.375	76.725
15	Huang Qun (CHN)	9.600	9.700	9.750	9.525	38.575	38.075	76.650
16	Yang Yanli (CHN)	9.625	9.525	9.725	9.675	38.550	38.025	76.575
17	Marie Roethlisberger (USA)	9.625	9.725	9.725	9.625	38.700	37.838	76.538
18	Kelly Garrison (USA)	9.725	9.550	9.550	9.550	38.375	38.025	76.400
19	Andrea Ladányi (HUN)	9.575	9.750	9.250	9.675	38.250	37.950	76.200
20	Alena Dřevjaná (TCH)	9.625	9.775	8.950	9.650	38.000	38.150	76.150
21	Tünde Zsilinszki (HUN)	9.575	9.575	9.625	9.625	38.400	37.550	75.950
22	Laura Muñoz (ESP)	9.650	9.450	9.450	9.500	38.050	37.863	75.913
23	Anja Wilhelm (FRG)	9.575	9.700	9.275	9.500	38.050	37.675	75.725
24	Diana Dudeva (BUL)	9.550	8.350	9.775	9.675	37.350	38.350	75.700
25	Beáta Storczer (HUN)	9.575	9.625	9.025	9.575	37.800	37.838	75.638
26	Christina McDonald (CAN)	9.600	9.625	8.925	9.600	37.750	37.863	75.613
27	Yu Feng (CHN)	9.600	9.475	8.950	9.725	37.750	37.775	75.525
28	Cathy Giancaspro (CAN)	9.450	9.200	9.725	9.550	37.925	37.513	75.438
29	Andrea Owoc (CAN)	9.600	9.000	9.025	9.725	37.350	37.738	75.088
30	Patrizia Luconi (ITA)	9.625	9.625	8.850	9.325	37.425	37.375	74.800
31	Maiko Morio (JPN)	9.425	9.250	9.425	8.900	37.000	37.588	74.588
32	Therese Wilmink (NED)	9.550	9.375	9.250	9.375	37.450	36.988	74.438
33	Nobuko Ito (JPN)	9.550	9.225	9.350	9.300	37.425	36.888	74.313
34	Noriko Mochizuki (JPN)	9.525	9.600	8.850	9.200	37.175	36.913	74.088
35	Alexandra Lang (FRG)	9.600	9.325	9.325	8.800	37.050	37.025	74.075
36	Stefanie Tautz (FRG)	9.450	8.975	8.925	9.275	36.625	36.925	73.550

- Neither Shushunova nor Omelianchik had originally qualified to the individual all-around final. However, the Soviet coaches felt they would have a good shot at medalling, so their teammates Olga Mostepanova and Irina Baraksanova were pulled from all individual finals under the guise of injury.

=== Vault ===
Rank	Gymnast	Score	Prelim score	Total
1st place, gold medalist(s)	Yelena Shushunova (URS)	9.938	9.888	19.826
2nd place, silver medalist(s)	Ecaterina Szabo (ROU)	9.875	9.775	19.650
3rd place, bronze medalist(s)	Dagmar Kersten (GDR)	9.900	9.725	19.625
4	Huang Qun (CHN)	9.750	9.713	19.463
5	Boriana Stoyanova (BUL)	9.750	9.700	19.450
6	Natalia Yurchenko (URS)	9.425	9.838	19.263
6	Sabrina Mar (USA)	9.563	9.700	19.263
8	Yu Feng (CHN)	9.413	9.713	19.126

=== Uneven bars ===
Rank	Gymnast	Score	Prelim score	Total
1st place, gold medalist(s)	Gabriele Fähnrich (GDR)	9.950	9.988	19.938
2nd place, silver medalist(s)	Dagmar Kersten (GDR)	9.900	9.863	19.763
3rd place, bronze medalist(s)	Hana Říčná (TCH)	9.825	9.663	19.488
4	Camelia Voinea (ROU)	9.680	9.783	19.463
5	Bojanka Demireva (BUL)	9.725	9.700	19.425
6	Ecaterina Szabo (ROU)	9.550	9.863	19.413
7	Andrea Ladányi (HUN)	9.575	9.775	19.350
8	Diana Dudeva (BUL)	9.100	9.700	18.800

=== Balance beam ===
Rank	Gymnast	Score	Prelim score	Total
1st place, gold medalist(s)	Daniela Silivaș (ROU)	10.000	9.813	19.813
2nd place, silver medalist(s)	Ecaterina Szabo (ROU)	9.875	9.900	19.775
3rd place, bronze medalist(s)	Yelena Shushunova (URS)	9.675	9.900	19.575
4	Iveta Poloková (TCH)	9.850	9.688	19.538
5	Hana Říčná (TCH)	9.800	9.675	19.475
6	Natalia Yurchenko (URS)	8.925	9.925	18.850
7	Pepa Kazakova (BUL)	8.900	9.725	18.625
8	Dagmar Kersten (GDR)	8.550	9.788	18.338

=== Floor exercise ===
Rank	Gymnast	Score	Prelim score	Total
1st place, gold medalist(s)	Oksana Omelianchik (URS)	10.000	9.900	19.900
2nd place, silver medalist(s)	Yelena Shushunova (URS)	9.950	9.938	19.888
3rd place, bronze medalist(s)	Ulrike Klotz (GDR)	9.900	9.875	19.775
4	Daniela Silivaș (ROU)	9.900	9.813	19.713
4	Ecaterina Szabo (ROU)	9.875	9.838	19.713
6	Dagmar Kersten (GDR)	9.875	9.750	19.625
7	Iveta Poloková (TCH)	9.825	9.800	19.625
8	Lenka Pitlovicová (TCH)	9.600	9.713	19.313

== Medals ==
Rank	Nation	Gold	Silver	Bronze	Total
1	Soviet Union (URS)	11	3	2	16
2	China (CHN)	3	3	1	7
3	East Germany (GDR)	2	2	6	10
4	Romania (ROU)	1	3	0	4
5	France (FRA)	0	1	0	1
6	Japan (JPN)	0	0	4	4
7	Czechoslovakia (TCH)	0	0	1	1
Totals (7 entries)		17	12	14	43
