= 1987 European Women's Artistic Gymnastics Championships =

16th European Women's Artistic Gymnastics Championships
- Location: Moscow, Soviet Union
- Dates: 21–24 May 1987

The 16th European Women's Artistic Gymnastics Championships were held in Moscow, Soviet Union, in 1987.

== Medalists ==
Event	Gold	Silver	Bronze
Seniors
All-Around	Daniela Silivaș (ROU)	Aleftina Pryakhina (URS)	Elena Shushunova (URS); Diana Dudeva (BUL)
Vault	Elena Shushunova (URS)	Daniela Silivaș (ROU)	Eugenia Golea (ROU)
Uneven Bars	Daniela Silivaș (ROU)	Diana Dudeva (BUL)	Dörte Thümmler (GDR)
Balance Beam	Daniela Silivaș (ROU)	Eugenia Golea (ROU)	Anja Wilhelm (FRG)
Floor	Daniela Silivaș (ROU)	Camelia Voinea (ROU)	Aleftina Pryakina (URS)

== Results ==
=== All-around ===
Rank	Gymnast	Vault (gymnastics)	Uneven bars	Balance beam	Floor (gymnastics)	Total
1st place, gold medalist(s)	Daniela Silivaș (ROU)	9.900	9.925	9.950	10.000	39.775
2nd place, silver medalist(s)	Aleftina Pryakhina (URS)	9.900	9.900	9.800	9.875	39.475
3rd place, bronze medalist(s)	Diana Dudeva (BUL)	9.750	9.900	9.725	9.825	39.200
3rd place, bronze medalist(s)	Elena Shushunova (URS)	9.900	9.500	9.900	9.900	39.200
5	Eugenia Golea (ROU)	9.500	9.775	9.800	9.750	39.175
6	Boriana Stoyanova (BUL)	9.825	9.800	9.400	9.825	38.850
7	Martina Jentsch (GDR)	9.675	9.750	9.575	9.750	38.750
8	Camelia Voinea (ROU)	9.700	9.725	9.175	9.950	38.550
8	Laura Muñoz (ESP)	9.725	9.575	9.550	9.700	38.550
10	Astrid Heese (GDR)	9.650	9.850	9.550	9.225	38.275
10	Svetlana Baitova (URS)	9.850	9.325	9.250	9.850	38.275
12	Anja Wilhelm (FRG)	9.550	9.375	9.700	9.625	38.250
12	Karine Boucher (FRA)	9.625	9.550	9.350	9.725	38.250
14	Beáta Storczer (HUN)	9.525	9.775	9.500	9.800	38.150
15	Dörte Thümmler (GDR)	9.575	9.875	9.050	9.600	38.100
16	Catherine Romano (FRA)	9.375	9.525	9.450	9.675	38.025
17	Karine Degret (FRA)	9.700	9.400	9.425	9.450	37.975
18	Christine Wetzel (FRG)	9.600	9.650	9.000	9.525	37.775
19	Eva Rueda (ESP)	9.500	9.500	9.150	9.575	37.725
20	Zsuzsa Csisztu (HUN)	9.525	9.675	8.900	9.475	37.575
21	Andrea Ladányi (HUN)	9.450	8.825	9.525	9.725	37.525
22	Jana Casteckova (TCH)	9.150	9.175	9.550	9.450	37.325
23	Joanna Zapolska (POL)	9.375	9.250	8.925	9.650	37.275
24	Lisa Elliott (GBR)	9.550	9.425	8.575	9.650	37.200
25	Antoanetta Ivanova (BUL)	9.675	9.550	9.375	8.525	37.125
26	Birgit Schier (GDR)	9.375	9.600	8.750	9.375	37.100
27	Karen Hargate (GBR)	9.500	9.400	8.650	9.525	37.075
28	Stefanie Tautz (FRG)	9.450	8.975	9.125	9.450	37.000
29	Alena Dřevjaná (TCH)	9.425	9.475	9.050	9.000	36.950
29	Nicoletta Dessena (SUI)	9.225	9.275	8.925	9.525	36.950

=== Vault Final ===
Rank	Gymnast	Total
1st place, gold medalist(s)	Elena Shushunova (URS)	19.856
2nd place, silver medalist(s)	Daniela Silivaș (ROM)	19.808
3rd place, bronze medalist(s)	Eugenia Golea (ROM)	19.700
4	Laura Muñoz (ESP)	19.531
5	Diana Dudeva (BUL)	19.508
6	Karine Degret (FRA)	19.500
7	Aleftina Pryakhina (URS)	19.488
8	Boriana Stoyanova (BUL)	19.356

=== Uneven bars ===
Rank	Gymnast	Total
1st place, gold medalist(s)	Daniela Silivaș (ROM)	19.900
2nd place, silver medalist(s)	Diana Dudeva (BUL)	19.838
3rd place, bronze medalist(s)	Dörte Thümmler (GDR)	19.788
4	Aleftina Pryakhina (URS)	19.763
5	Astrid Heese (GDR)	19.675
6	Boriana Stoyanova (BUL)	19.613
7	Eugenia Golea (ROM)	19.538
8	Beáta Storczer (HUN)	19.500

=== Balance beam ===
Rank	Gymnast	Total
1st place, gold medalist(s)	Daniela Silivaș (ROM)	19.875
2nd place, silver medalist(s)	Eugenia Golea (ROM)	19.663
3rd place, bronze medalist(s)	Anja Wilhelm (FRG)	19.400
4	Elena Shushunova (URS)	19.375
5	Laura Muñoz (ESP)	19.163
6	Aleftina Pryakhina (URS)	19.150
7	Diana Dudeva (BUL)	18.988
8	Martina Jentsch (GDR)	18.725

=== Floor exercise ===
Rank	Gymnast	Total
1st place, gold medalist(s)	Daniela Silivaș (ROM)	20.000
2nd place, silver medalist(s)	Camelia Voinea (ROM)	19.938
3rd place, bronze medalist(s)	Aleftina Pryakhina (URS)	19.750
4	Boriana Stoyanova (BUL)	19.688
5	Beáta Storczer (HUN)	19.638
6	Martina Jentsch (GDR)	19.588
7	Elena Shushunova (URS)	19.388
8	Diana Dudeva (BUL)	18.675
