= Vera Kolesnikova =

Soviet artistic gymnast

- Full name: Vera Vladimirovna Kolesnikova
- Born: 7 October 1968 (age 58) Perlyovka, Semiluksky District, Voronezh Oblast, Russian SSR, Soviet Union
- Relatives: Viktoria Komova (daughter)

Gymnastics career
- Discipline: Women's artistic gymnastics
- Country represented: Soviet Union; (1982–1988)
- Club: Spartak
- Head coach: Rima Aleksandrova
- Former coach: Nikolai Vodianikh
- Retired: 1988
Medal record
Representing Soviet Union
World Championships
Gold medal – first place	1985 Montreal	Team
Goodwill Games
Gold medal – first place	1986 Moscow	Team
Gold medal – first place	1986 Moscow	All-around
Gold medal – first place	1986 Moscow	Balance beam
Silver medal – second place	1986 Moscow	Uneven bars
Universiade
Gold medal – first place	1987 Zagreb	Team
Silver medal – second place	1987 Zagreb	All-around
Silver medal – second place	1987 Zagreb	Uneven bars
Silver medal – second place	1987 Zagreb	Balance beam

Vera Vladimirovna Kolesnikova (Russian: Вера Владимировна Колесникова; born 7 October 1968) is a Soviet former artistic gymnast. She was a member of the gold medal-winning team at the 1985 World Championships. She is the 1986 Goodwill Games all-around champion and the 1987 Summer Universiade all-around silver medalist. She is the mother of two-time World champion Viktoria Komova.

== Gymnastics career ==
Kolesnikova was an alternate for the 1983 World Championships team. She was scheduled to compete at the 1984 American Cup until the Soviet Union withdrew entirely from the competition.

At the 1985 Australia Games, Kolesnikova won the all-around, vault, and uneven bars gold medals. She was selected to compete at the 1985 World Championships alongside Irina Baraksanova, Olga Mostepanova, Oksana Omelianchik, Yelena Shushunova, and Natalia Yurchenko, and they won the gold medal in the team competition.

Kolesnikova helped the Soviet team win a 1986 dual meet against the United States, and she tied for third place in the all-around with Natalia Frolova. At the 1986 Goodwill Games, she won the individual all-around title in addition to the Soviet Union winning the team competition. In the event finals, she won a gold medal on the balance beam and a silver medal on the uneven bars behind teammate Yelena Shushunova.

At the 1987 Summer Universiade, Kolesnikova and the Soviet team won the gold medal. Individually, she won the all-around silver medal behind teammate Yelena Shushunova. She also won silver medals in the uneven bars and floor exercise finals, both behind Shushunova, and placed seventh in the vault final.

Kolesnikova retired from the sport after not being selected for the 1988 Summer Olympics team.

== Personal life ==
After retiring, Kolesnikova began coaching in Voronezh. She married Alexander Komov, another former gymnast, in 1991. They had a son Alexander, and their daughter Viktoria Komova is a two-time World champion and two-time silver medalist at the 2012 Summer Olympics.
