= Gymnastics at the 1988 Summer Olympics – Women's uneven bars =

Women's uneven bars at the Games of the XXIV Olympiad
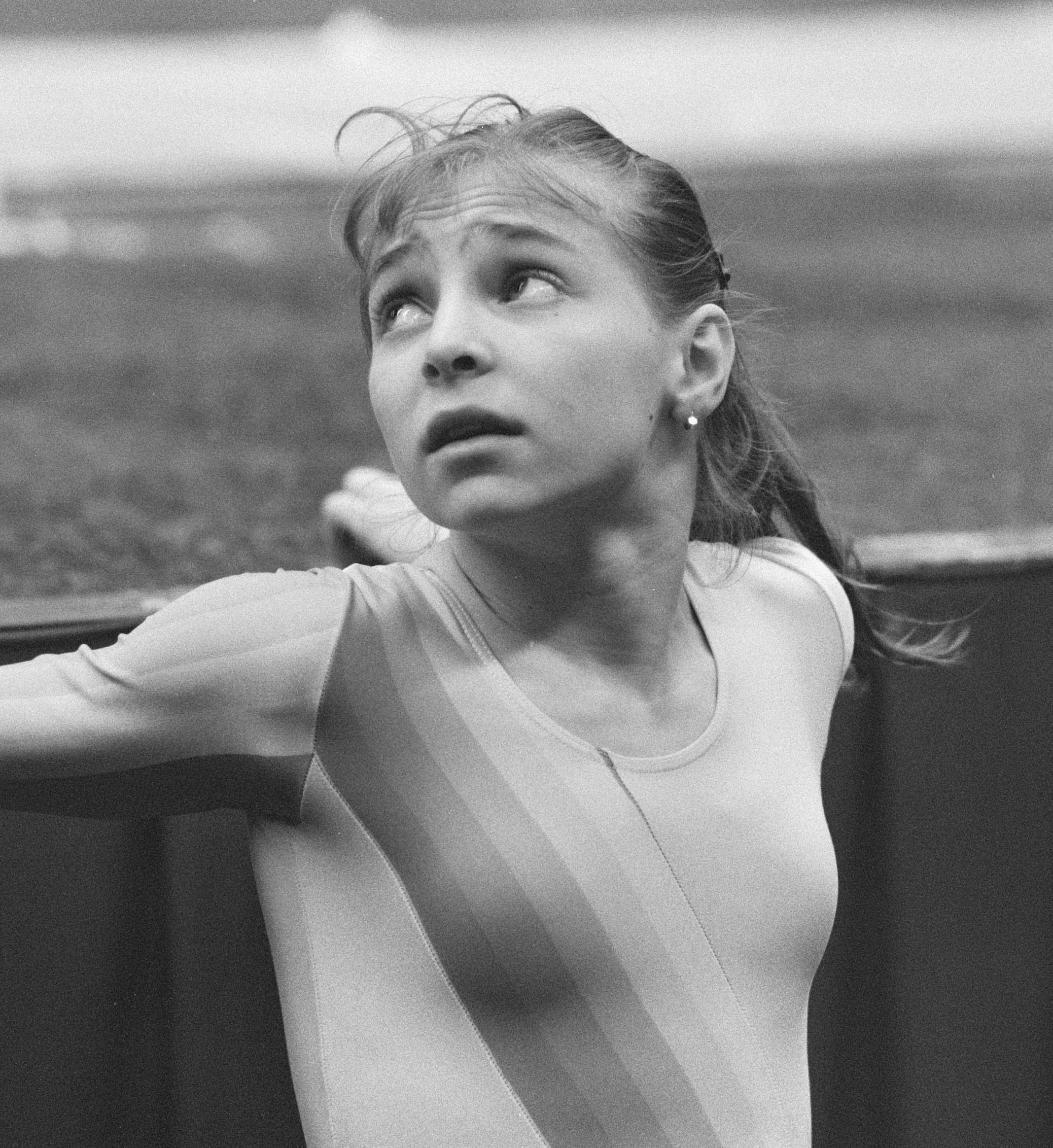
- Gold medalist Daniela Silivaş (1987)
- Venue: Olympic Gymnastics Arena
- Date: 19 – 25 September 1988
- Competitors: 90 from 23 nations

Medalists
1st place, gold medalist(s)		Daniela Silivaş	Romania
2nd place, silver medalist(s)		Dagmar Kersten	East Germany
3rd place, bronze medalist(s)		Elena Shushunova	Soviet Union

These are the results of the women's uneven bars competition, one of six events for female competitors in artistic gymnastics at the 1988 Summer Olympics in Seoul. The qualification and final rounds took place on September 19, 21 and 25th at the Olympic Gymnastics Hall.

== Results ==
=== Qualification ===
Eighty-six gymnasts competed in the uneven bars event during compulsory and optional rounds on September 19 and 21. The eight highest scoring gymnasts advanced to the final on September 25. Each country was limited to two competitors in the final. Half of the points earned by each gymnast during both the compulsory and optional rounds carried over to the final. This constitutes the "prelim" score.

=== Final ===
Rank	Gymnast	C	O	C+O	Prelim	Final	Total
Gold medal	Daniela Silivaş (ROU)	10.000	10.000	20.000	10.000	10.000	20.000
Silver medal	Dagmar Kersten (GDR)	10.000	9.975	19.975	9.987	10.000	19.987
Bronze medal	Elena Shushunova (URS)	9.925	10.000	19.925	9.962	10.000	19.962
4	Dörte Thümmler (GDR)	9.950	9.950	19.900	9.950	9.950	19.900
5	Svetlana Boginskaya (URS)	9.925	9.900	19.825	9.912	9.987	19.899
6	Iveta Poloková (TCH)	9.825	9.900	19.725	9.862	9.975	19.837
7	Aurelia Dobre (ROU)	9.825	9.900	19.725	9.862	9.962	19.824
8	Phoebe Mills (USA)	9.750	9.925	19.675	9.837	9.950	19.787
