= Fähnrich (surname) =

Fähnrich, Fahnrich or Faehnrich is a surname. Notable people with the surname include:

- Heinz Fähnrich, German Caucasologist (de:Heinz Fähnrich)
- Gabriele Fähnrich (born 1968), East German gymnast
