= Camelia Voinea =

Romanian artistic gymnast

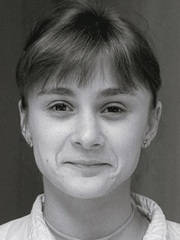
- Voinea in the 1980s

Personal information
- Born: 1 March 1970 (age 56) Constanța, Romania
- Height: 151 cm (4 ft 11 in)

Gymnastics career
- Discipline: Women's artistic gymnastics
- Country represented: Romania
- Club: Farul Constanța
- Head coaches: Adrian Goreac; Maria Cosma; Octavian Bellu; Adrian Stan
- Former coaches: Matei Stănei; Olga Didilescu
- Retired: 1988
Medal record
Olympic Games
Silver medal – second place	1988 Seoul	Team
World Championships
Gold medal – first place	1987 Rotterdam	Team
Silver medal – second place	1985 Montreal	Team
European Championships
Silver medal – second place	1987 Moscow	Floor Exercise
World Cup Final
Silver medal – second place	1986 Beijing	Floor Exercise

Camelia Voinea (born 1 March 1970) is a retired Romanian artistic gymnast, who competed in international events between 1984 and 1988. She was best known for her powerful tumbling, her innovative 1986–87 floor exercise that featured breakdancing elements, and for being the first gymnast to tumble a double layout to punch front somersault. In 1987 she scored a perfect ten for the floor exercise during the team competition event at the World Championships.

== Career ==
Voinea started to train for gymnastics at the CSS 1 Farul Constanța Club under the direction of coach Matei Stănei. Later she trained with the national team at Deva under coaches Adrian Goreac, Adrian Stan, and Maria Cosma. Her international debut was at the Balkan Championships (1984) where she placed first with the team, second all-around, first on floor, and second on vault and uneven bars. The 1985 World Championships in Montreal was her first major international competition. She won silver with the team, placed fourth in the uneven bars event, and ninth in the all-around. One year later she was invited to compete in the World Cup in Beijing. She placed ninth all-around and won silver on floor behind Elena Shushunova.

At the 1987 European Championships in Moscow, Voinea won silver in the floor finals and she tied with Laura Munoz for eighth place in the all-around. Together with Aurelia Dobre, Eugenia Golea, Celestina Popa, Daniela Silivaș and Ecaterina Szabo, Voinea was a member of the gold medal-winning team at the 1987 World Artistic Gymnastics Championships in Rotterdam, The Netherlands. During the floor event in the team optional finals Voinea, Dobre and Silivaș scored three consecutive 10s from the judges. In her floor routine, Voinea incorporated breakdancing elements. One year later, Voinea was a member of the silver winning team at the 1988 Summer Olympics.

== Post-retirement ==
Voinea retired after the 1988 Olympic Games. Following her retirement she attended the University of Bucharest for two years, leaving mid-way for a coaching opportunity in Italy. She returned home in 1994, to coach alongside her first coach Matei Stănei. The money Voinea earned while coaching abroad was invested in an agricultural business near Constanța.

Voinea coaches her daughter Sabrina, born in 2007.

== Controversies ==
In November 2025, Voinea was accused of physical, verbal, and mental abuse by multiple former gymnasts, who alleged that they were hit for making mistakes, beaten on the head, and dragged by the hair. Two weeks later, video was released showing Voinea pinching and screaming at her daughter when she was eight or nine years old while forcing her to repeat an element she was struggling with.

Foti Tona, a former physiotherapist for the Romanian women's gymnastics team, came forward with reports of when Voinea threatened and swore at him for working with other gymnasts in the recovery room during his allotted time for the room, mentioning that Sabrina was the priority and then blocked the door to the office so that no other gymnast could enter and undergo physiotherapy.

The following month another of one of Voinea's former gymnasts came forward detailing the ways in which Voinea was abusive. She recalled being beaten by Voinea and when her mother called to complain, Voinea started beating her even harder. She mentioned that Voinea would use two sticks, one thinner and made of metal, the other thicker and made of walnut. When her mother went to the president of the Farul Constanța club to show photographic evidence of the abuse, she was informed that they knew Voinea was abusing gymnasts but claimed "there's nothing we can do about it". The gymnast further detailed how Voinea would beat her own daughter, Sabrina, if she didn't get first place in a competition or lock her in the locker room as punishment.

In May 2026, the Romanian Gymnastics Federation announced that Voinea was temporarily suspended, stating that "the issues reported require a judicious and specialized analysis by the competent state authorities".
