= Dagmar Kersten =

German gymnast (born 1970)

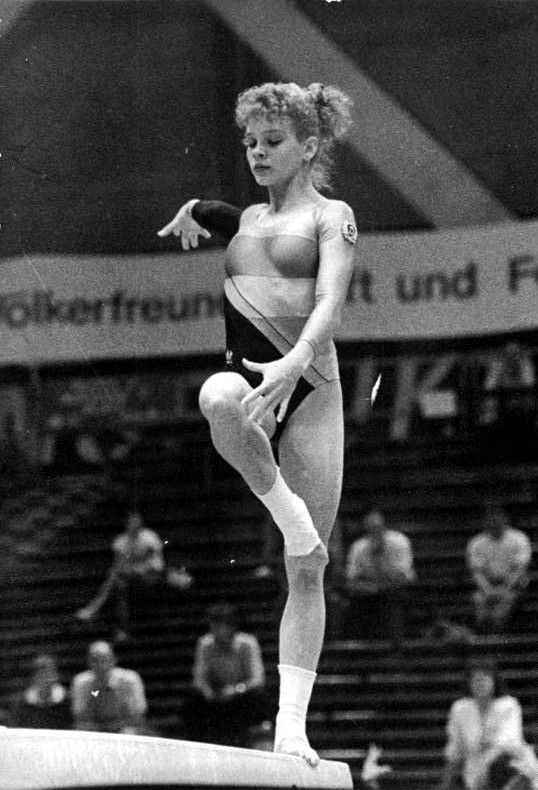
- Kersten in 1988

Personal information
- Born: 28 October 1970 (age 55) Altdöbern, Bezirk Cottbus, East Germany
- Height: 1.57 m (5 ft 2 in)

Gymnastics career
- Discipline: Women's artistic gymnastics
- Club: SC Dynamo Berlin
Medal record
Representing East Germany
Olympic Games
Silver medal – second place	1988 Seoul	Uneven bars
Bronze medal – third place	1988 Seoul	Team
World Championships
Silver medal – second place	1985 Montreal	Uneven bars
Bronze medal – third place	1985 Montreal	All-around
Bronze medal – third place	1985 Montreal	Vault
Bronze medal – third place	1985 Montreal	Team
European Championships
Bronze medal – third place	1985 Helsinki	Vault

Dagmar Kersten (born 28 October 1970) is a German former artistic gymnast. She represented East Germany at the 1988 Olympic Games, winning a silver medal on the uneven bars and a bronze medal in the team event. In 1985, she won four medals at the World Championships, including silver on the bars and bronze in the all-around. She was awarded the Patriotic Order of Merit.

== Career ==
Kersten was encouraged to train in gymnastics by her father, and she was scouted for her gymnastics talent due to having a large amount of energy and a small stature. At nine, she began boarding at an elite training school in East Berlin, and at 13 she joined the national team. She trained almost 40 hours a week and experienced verbal abuse and extreme weight management, though she recounted overall enjoying her boarding school experience in the early years.

Without her knowledge, Kersten was part of the East German doping program and was given pills starting at 13. She was told some pills were vitamins given to infants to help their bones develop.

Kersten won a bronze medal on the vault at the 1985 European Championships, where she also finished fifth in the all-around, tied with Ecaterina Szabo, and sixth on the balance beam. At the 1985 World Championships in Montreal, she won a bronze medal in the team event as the highest-scoring member of the team and another in the all-around behind joint winners Oksana Omelianchik and Elena Shushunova of the Soviet Union. She also made all four apparatus finals, where she won silver on bars behind GDR teammate Gabriele Fahnrich and a bronze on the vault. She was sixth on floor and eighth on the balance beam.

In 1985, she suffered a serious spine injury and had to stop training. As part of her recovery treatment, she was prescribed Oral Turinabol, an anabolic steroid. Her physician, Dr. Bernd Pansold, was later convicted in 1998 for the procurement of drugs to minors. Before the 1988 Olympics, she was administered other performance-enhancing drugs under the disguise of nutrition supplements.

At the 1988 Olympics in Seoul, Kersten won two medals: bronze in the team event, followed by a silver medal on bars behind Romanian Daniela Silivas. She also finished sixth in the vault final and eighth in the all-around.

== Post-competitive career ==
After German reunification, Kersten moved to Stuttgart and worked at the Swabian Gymnastics Federation. Until 2002, she coached the German junior team. Later, she worked as a speaker of the Lower Saxony Gymnastics Federation and a coach for an acrobatic show, which included her daughter, Alina. She also holds second dan in taekwondo and teaches martial arts at a dojo she founded in Oldenburg. Her son, Erik, is a taekwondo practitioner.

Kersten has appeared as a motivational speaker, talking about her experience with being experimented on by the East German doping program. In 2022, Kersten launched a podcast about her experience as a gymnast called Ausgeturnt – Noch Lange Nicht! (English: Far From Being Done With Gymnastics).

== Competitive history ==
Year	Event	Team	AA	VT	UB	BB	FX
Junior
1983	Children's and Youth Spartakiade		1st place, gold medalist(s)	1st place, gold medalist(s)	1st place, gold medalist(s)		
1984	Junior Friendship Tournament	2nd place, silver medalist(s)	24	8			
Senior
1985	Cottbus International		4	1st place, gold medalist(s)			
1985	DTB Cup		1st place, gold medalist(s)	4	6	6	2nd place, silver medalist(s)
1985	Dynamo Spartakiade		2nd place, silver medalist(s)				
1985	European Championships		5	3rd place, bronze medalist(s)		6	
1985	GDR-HUN Dual Meet	1st place, gold medalist(s)	1st place, gold medalist(s)				
1985	GDR-NOR-SWE Tri-Meet	1st place, gold medalist(s)	1st place, gold medalist(s)				
1985	World Championships	3rd place, bronze medalist(s)	3rd place, bronze medalist(s)	3rd place, bronze medalist(s)	2nd place, silver medalist(s)	8	6
1987	DTB Cup		3rd place, bronze medalist(s)		1st place, gold medalist(s)		2nd place, silver medalist(s)
1987	GDR Championships		1st place, gold medalist(s)				
1988	China Cup		3rd place, bronze medalist(s)				
1988	Cottbus International		8	3rd place, bronze medalist(s)		3rd place, bronze medalist(s)	6
1988	GDR Championships		1st place, gold medalist(s)	1st place, gold medalist(s)	1st place, gold medalist(s)	2nd place, silver medalist(s)	2nd place, silver medalist(s)
1988	GDR Olympic Trials		1st place, gold medalist(s)				
1988	Moscow News		5	9	3rd place, bronze medalist(s)	3rd place, bronze medalist(s)	8
1988	Olympic Games	3rd place, bronze medalist(s)		6	2nd place, silver medalist(s)		
