= Celestina Popa =

Romanian artistic gymnast

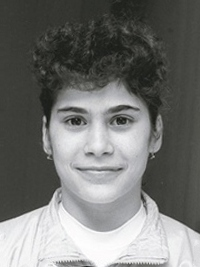

Personal information
- Full name: Celestina Stefania Popa
- Born: 12 July 1970 (age 56) Ploiești, Romania
- Height: 145 cm (4 ft 9 in)

Gymnastics career
- Discipline: Women's artistic gymnastics
- Country represented: Romania
- Head coaches: Adrian Goreac, Maria Cosma, Octavian Bellu
- Former coach: Leana Sima
- Eponymous skills: Popa (floor)
- Retired: 1989
Medal record
Olympic Games
Silver medal – second place	1988 Seoul	Team competition
World Championships
Gold medal – first place	1987 Rotterdam	Team competition
Silver medal – second place	1985 Montreal	Team competition

Celestina Stefania Popa-Toma (born 12 July 1970) is a retired Romanian artistic gymnast, who competed internationally between 1985 and 1988. She is an Olympic silver medalist and a world gold and silver medalist with the team. She is best known for her eponymous straddle pike jump with full turn on floor as well as for her flexibility and style.

== Career ==
In 1984 Popa placed second at the Romanian Junior Nationals and she became a member of the national team. In 1985 she was a member of the silver medal-winning team at the 1985 World Championships. Also in 1985, she was the all around champion, vault and beam gold medalist at the International Chunichi Cup in Japan.

Together with Aurelia Dobre, Camelia Voinea, Eugenia Golea, Daniela Silivaș and Ecaterina Szabo, Popa was a member of the gold medal-winning team at the 1987 World Championships in Rotterdam, The Netherlands. In 1988 she won the silver medal with the team at the Olympics and placed tenth all around in the preliminaries.

== Eponymous skill ==
Popa has one eponymous skill listed in the Code of Points.

Apparatus	Name	Description	Difficulty (Note: Valid for the 2025–2028 Code of Points)
Floor exercise	Popa	Straddle pike jump with 1/1 turn (360°)	C (0.3)

== Post-retirement ==
After retiring from competitions in 1989 she studied at a sport school in Bucharest until 1991, and in 1994 graduated from university with a degree in physical education. She hold the National Romanian Coaching Certification Level III. Popa has been coaching since 1991, and since 1994 she has been a recreational coach at Flicka Gymnastics in North Vancouver, British Columbia, Canada. She is married to fellow former Romanian gymnast Flaviu Toma, who was a longtime head coach and technical director at Flicka. In 2009, she opened her own gym "Celestina Popa Gymnastics" in Maple Ridge, British Columbia, Canada.
