= Inside Gymnastics =

- Categories: Sports magazine Gymnastics
- Frequency: Bi-monthly
- Publisher: Christopher Korotky
- First issue: March 2002
- Company: Inside Publications, LLC
- Country: United States
- Based in: Atlanta, Georgia
- Language: English
- Website: insidegymnastics.com
- ISSN: 1543-110X
- OCLC: 51324414

Inside Gymnastics is an American sports magazine about gymnastics.

== History ==
First published in 2002, Inside Gymnastics covers gymnastics worldwide. It is published by Inside Publications, LLC, who also produce Inside Cheerleading, Inside Dance, and Inside Action Sports magazines.

Its reporting, which features interviews with current and former gymnasts, has been used by the Olympic Games, MSN, and numerous newspapers including USA Today, The Boston Globe, and The Des Moines Register.

In addition to its print magazine, Inside Gymnastics also publishes stories on its website, insidegymnastics.com, and maintains a social media presence on Instagram, Facebook, and Twitter.
