= Laura Muñoz =

Spanish gymnast (born 1970)

- Full name: Laura Muñoz Ilundain
- Born: June 9, 1970 (age 55)

Gymnastics career
- Discipline: Women's artistic gymnastics
- Country represented: Spain

Laura Muñoz (born 9 June 1970) is a Spanish gymnast. She competed at the 1984 Summer Olympics and the 1988 Summer Olympics. She was a three-time national champion.

== Gymnastics career ==
Muñoz was noted to be active at a young age, and at seven, her parents took her to a swimming class. She instead went to look in on a gymnastics class, in which her parents eventually enrolled her. She joined the national team in 1980 and won the national championships three times (1984, 1985, and 1987).

She placed 31st at the 1983 World Championships, and at the 1983 Mediterranean Games, she won the team event with the Spanish team as well as two individual gold medals in the all-around and on the balance beam. However, she was too young to compete at a senior international competition; the age requirements at the time required a gymnast to turn 15 the year of competition, and Muñoz, being born in 1970, turned 13 that year. This meant that she was also too young for the 1984 Summer Olympics, where she competed and finished in 14th place.

In 1985, she placed 22nd at the World Championships, and in 1987, she finished in 16th place.

At the 1987 national championships, she received a perfect 10 score on the vault. She won five more gold medals at the 1987 Mediterranean Games.

She placed 23rd at the 1988 Summer Olympics. After the Olympics, she had surgery on her elbow. She finished second at the national championships in 1989 and retired in 1991.

== Post-gymnastics career ==
Muñoz studied educational psychology and worked as a schoolteacher for ten years. She has worked at the Fundación Madrid por el Deporte (Madrid for Sport Foundation) since 2008.
