= Cathy Giancaspro =

Canadian gymnast

Personal information
- Born: 23 November 1970 (age 54) Montreal, Quebec, Canada

Sport
- Sport: Gymnastics

Cathy Giancaspro (born 23 November 1970) is a Canadian gymnast. She competed in six events at the 1988 Summer Olympics.
