= Oksana Omelianchik =

Soviet and Russian gymnast

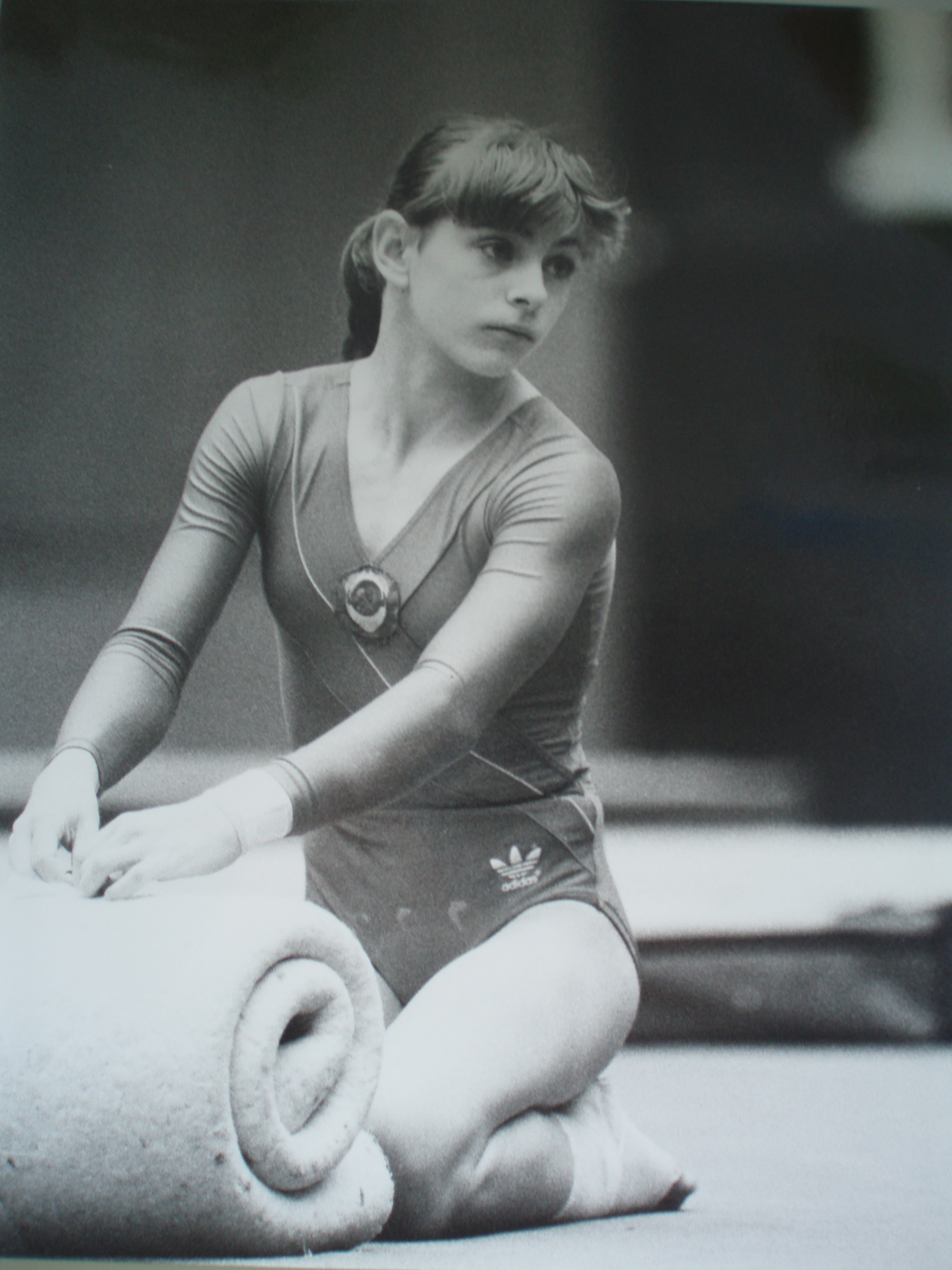

Personal information
- Full name: Oksana Alexandrovna Omelianchik
- Born: 2 January 1970 (age 56) Ulan-Ude, Russian SFSR, Soviet Union (now Russia)
- Height: 140 cm (4 ft 7 in)

Gymnastics career
- Discipline: Women's artistic gymnastics
- Country represented: Soviet Union (1983–89 (URS))
- Gym: Round Lake national training center; Spartak Kiev
- Head coaches: Valentina Panchenko, Valery Tupitsy, Tatiana Perskaya
- Music: 1987: Ballet Russe
- Retired: 1989
Medal record
Representing Soviet Union
World Championships
Gold medal – first place	1985 Montreal	Team
Gold medal – first place	1985 Montreal	All-Around
Gold medal – first place	1985 Montreal	Floor Exercise
Silver medal – second place	1987 Rotterdam	Team
World Cup Final
Gold medal – first place	1986 Beijing	Balance Beam
Silver medal – second place	1986 Beijing	Vault
Silver medal – second place	1986 Beijing	Uneven Bars
Bronze medal – third place	1986 Beijing	All-Around
Bronze medal – third place	1986 Beijing	Floor Exercise
Goodwill Games
Gold medal – first place	1986 Moscow	Team
Silver medal – second place	1986 Moscow	Floor Exercise
Bronze medal – third place	1986 Moscow	All-Around
European Championships
Gold medal – first place	1985 Helsinki	Balance Beam
Silver medal – second place	1985 Helsinki	Floor Exercise
Bronze medal – third place	1985 Helsinki	All-Around
Bronze medal – third place	1985 Helsinki	Uneven Bars

Oksana Omelianchik (Russian: Оксана Александровна Омельянчик; Ukrainian: Окса́на Oлекса́ндрiвна Омелья́нчик, romanized: Oksana Oleksandrivna Omelianchyk; alternative transliterations: Oksana Omel'yantchik, Oksana Omel'yanchik, Oksana Omeliantchik; born 2 January 1970) is a retired Soviet gymnast and the all-around gold medalist of the 1985 World Championships. Omelianchik was most known for her enthusiastic showmanship, difficulty and originality, including pioneering back-to-back tumbling.

== Early life and career ==
Omelianchik was born on 2 January 1970 in Ulan-Ude, Russian SFSR, Soviet Union. She was originally a figure skater, and participated in her first skating meet at the age of 6. She began gymnastics on the recommendation of her skating choreographer, who believed she had potential in the sport. She trained at the Spartak club in Kyiv, where her coaches included Valentina Panchenko, Valery Tupitsy and Tatiana Perskaya.

By 1983, Omelianchik was competing internationally for the USSR. At that year's Junior Friendship Tournament (Druzhba), an important meet for junior gymnasts, she earned gold medals on the floor exercise and uneven bars and placed fourth in the all-around competition. At her first USSR Championships in 1983, she placed fifth in the all-around. The next year, she competed in both the junior and senior USSR Championships, winning the all-around silver medal at the former and finishing fourth at the latter, and was selected as the alternate for the Soviet team at the 1984 Friendship Games (also known as 'Olomouc', after the city in which the competition was held).

== Senior career ==
In 1985, Omelianchik won the Soviet National Championships, beating the future Olympic champion Elena Shushunova. She also competed at the European Championships for the first time, winning the balance beam title showing a triple twist dismount. She also won a bronze medal in the all-around behind Shushunova and East German Maxi Gnauck, silver on the floor exercise, and bronze on the uneven bars.

Omelianchik was a member of the gold-winning Soviet team at the 1985 World Gymnastics Championships in Montreal. She struggled in the team competition and did not qualify for the all-around final. However, Soviet team officials decided to pull Olga Mostepanova and Irina Baraksanova, who had both qualified for the finals, and substitute Omelianchik and her teammate Shushunova. The decision proved to be sound; the two Soviet gymnasts tied for the all-around gold and became Worlds co-champions. In the event finals, Omelianchik won the floor gold medal with her "Birdie" exercise, which would become her most well-known routine.

Omelianchik continued to compete for the Soviet team after the World Championships, placing third in the all-around at the 1986 Goodwill Games and third all around at the World Cup in Beijing. She also won the balance beam title and placed second on uneven bars and vault and third on floor exercise. The following year at the World Championships the Soviet team lost the title to a dominant team from Romania. Omelianchik debuted her new vault which introduced the half-on technique in the roundoff family of vaults. She also showcased a new floor routine to Ballet Russe and a new triple full to a tuck front rebound, but suffered an uncharacteristic fall in the team competition. She placed fifth in the all-around and qualified only for the vault final; however, she was eventually withdrawn by team officials, with Svetlana Baitova competing in her place.

Despite maintaining consistent results within the top the 7 in the USSR Cup and USSR Championships for years, Omelianchik was not selected for the 1988 Olympics. She was named as an alternate to the team and traveled with them to Seoul, but was not called upon to compete. Her final competition was the 1989 USSR Cup, where she placed 2nd in the all-around.

== Post-retirement ==
Omelianchik remains heavily involved in gymnastics as a choreographer, coach and judge. She heads the women's technical committee for the Ukrainian Gymnastics Federation and choreographs routines for many of Ukraine's top gymnastics, including Alina Kozich and Olha Rozshchupkina.

In a poll in Inside Gymnastics magazine, she was chosen as one of the "Top Ten All-Around Gymnasts of All Time." In 2023, she was inducted into the International Gymnastics Hall of Fame.

== Skills ==
Omelianchik was noted for her innovative skills, clean execution and energetic, inspired presentation. Omelianchik was one of the pioneers of back-to-back tumbling on floor exercise, a series of skills in which a gymnast completes one full tumbling run from one end of the mat to the other, rebounds, and performs another complete tumbling run in the opposite direction without stopping.

=== Eponymous skills ===
Omelianchik has two eponymous skills listed in the Code of Points.

Apparatus	Name	Description	Difficulty (Note: Valid for the 2025-2028 Code of Points)
Vault	Omelianchik	Round-off flic-flac with ½ turn (180°) on - piked salto forward of	4.0
Balance beam	Omelianchik	Flic-flac with ¾ turn (270°) to side handstand (hold 2 seconds)	D (0.4)

== Achievements ==
Year	Event	Team	AA	VT	UB	BB	FX
1983	Druzhba	1st place, gold medalist(s)	4		1st place, gold medalist(s)		1st place, gold medalist(s)
1983	Ukrainian Spartakiade		2nd place, silver medalist(s)		1st place, gold medalist(s)		
1983	USSR Championships		5		6		
1984	Junior USSR Championships				2nd place, silver medalist(s)		
1984	Moscow News		5		3rd place, bronze medalist(s)		
1984	USSR Championships		4		4	4	3rd place, bronze medalist(s)
1984	USSR Cup		7				
1985
1985	European Championships		3rd place, bronze medalist(s)	5	3rd place, bronze medalist(s)	1st place, gold medalist(s)	2nd place, silver medalist(s)
1985	Moscow News		2nd place, silver medalist(s)			1st place, gold medalist(s)	1st place, gold medalist(s)
1985	Rome Grand Prix		1st place, gold medalist(s)				
1985	USSR Championships		1st place, gold medalist(s)			2nd place, silver medalist(s)	2nd place, silver medalist(s)
1985	USSR Cup		4				
1985	World Championships	1st place, gold medalist(s)	1st place, gold medalist(s)				1st place, gold medalist(s)
1986	Kraft International		12			1st place, gold medalist(s)	
1986	World Sports Fair		1st place, gold medalist(s)		1st place, gold medalist(s)	1st place, gold medalist(s)	1st place, gold medalist(s)
1986	Goodwill Games	1st place, gold medalist(s)	3rd place, bronze medalist(s)				2nd place, silver medalist(s)
1986	USSR Championships				2nd place, silver medalist(s)		4
1986	USSR Cup		7		2nd place, silver medalist(s)		
1986	World Cup		3rd place, bronze medalist(s)	2nd place, silver medalist(s)	2nd place, silver medalist(s)	1st place, gold medalist(s)	3rd place, bronze medalist(s)
1987	USSR Championships		6		5	4	3rd place, bronze medalist(s)
1987	USSR Cup		3rd place, bronze medalist(s)				3rd place, bronze medalist(s)
1987	World Championships	2nd place, silver medalist(s)	5				
1988	Kraft International		3rd place, bronze medalist(s)			1st place, gold medalist(s)	2nd place, silver medalist(s)
1988	USA-USSR Dual Meet	1st place, gold medalist(s)	3rd place, bronze medalist(s)				
1988	USSR Championships		4	6		3rd place, bronze medalist(s)	2nd place, silver medalist(s)
1988	USSR Cup		8				
1989	USSR Championships		22				2nd place, silver medalist(s)
