= Eugenia Golea =

Romanian gymnast (born 1971)

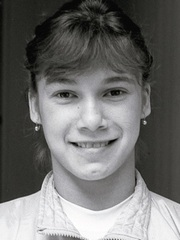
- Golea in the 1980s

Personal information
- Born: 10 March 1971 (age 55) Bucharest, Romania
- Height: 159 cm (5 ft 3 in)

Gymnastics career
- Discipline: Women's artistic gymnastics
- Country represented: Romania (1984–88 (ROM))
- Head coaches: Adrian Goreac; Maria Cosma; Octavian Bellu; Adrian Stan
- Former coaches: Mihai Demetrescu; Lucia Marcu
Medal record
Olympic Games
Silver medal – second place	1988 Seoul	Team competition
World Championships
Gold medal – first place	1987 Rotterdam	Team competition
Silver medal – second place	1985 Montreal	Team competition
Silver medal – second place	1987 Rotterdam	Vault
European Championships
Silver medal – second place	1987 Moscow	Beam
Bronze medal – third place	1987 Moscow	Vault

Eugenia Golea (born 10 March 1971) is a retired Romanian artistic gymnast, who competed in international events between 1984 and 1988. She is known for scoring a perfect 10 for the vault optional in the team competition of the 1987 World Artistic Gymnastics Championships and for being the first gymnast to compete two consecutive layout stepout jumps. She helped her team to win an Olympic silver medal, a world title and a world silver medal. She liked all the events equally, though she excelled in vaulting and floor. On vault she won a world silver medal and a continental bronze and on beam she won a continental silver medal.

== Career ==
Golea began training at School Club N 2 in Bucharest under the coaching of Lucia Marcu and Mihai Demetrescu. Later she joined the national team at Deva where she trained with Adrian Gorean, Adrian Stan and Maria Cosma. Her debut as a senior in an international event was in 1984. Although she had an excellent showing at the 1984 Balkan Championships where she placed first with the team and third all-around she was left off the 1984 Olympic team.

In 1985 she was a member of the silver winning team at the World Championships in Montreal. In 1987, together with Aurelia Dobre, Camelia Voinea, Celestina Popa, Daniela Silivaș and Ecaterina Szabo, Golea was a member of the gold medal-winning team at the 1987 World Artistic Gymnastics Championships in Rotterdam, Netherlands. During the vault optional in the team finals both Aurelia Dobre and Golea scored perfect tens from the judges, Golea being one of three women (along with Elena Shushunova and Svetlana Baitova) to debut the double twisting yurchenko at the World Championships that year. Individually she won the silver medal on vault behind Elena Shushunova. She added two more individual medals at the 1987 European Championships in Moscow, a silver on beam and a bronze on vault. After winning silver with the team at the 1988 Summer Olympics, Golea retired.

== Post-retirement ==
After retiring she joined her brother in an acrobatic circus act. In 1991 she moved to Puerto Rico. There, she worked for a circus and helped coach the Puerto Rican gymnastics team. Golea eventually moved to the United States to work as a gymnastic coach and choreographer. She coached at American Gymnastics in Bedford Hills, New York and YWCA in White Plains, New York.
