= Svetlana Baitova =

Belarusian artistic gymnast

Personal information
- Born: 3 September 1972 (age 53) Mogilev, Soviet Union
- Height: 1.52 m (5 ft 0 in)
- Weight: 39 kg (86 lb)

Sport
- Sport: Artistic gymnastics
- Club: Spartak Mogilev
Medal record
Representing the Soviet Union
Olympic Games
Gold medal – first place	1988 Seoul	Team
World championships
Gold medal – first place	1989 Stuttgart	Team
Silver medal – second place	1987 Rotterdam	Team

Svetlana Nikolayevna Baitova (Belarusian: Святлана Мікалаеўна Баітава; Russian: Светлана Николаевна Баитова; born 3 September 1972) is a retired Belarusian gymnast. She won a gold medal at the 1988 Olympic Games as a member of the Soviet team and finished fourth in the all-around final at the 1987 World Championships.

== Career ==
Baitova competed at the 1988 Summer Olympics and won a gold medal with the Soviet team. Individually, she finished 13th in the team competition but did not qualify for the all-around final (top 36) as she was the fourth ranked Soviet and the limit was three gymnasts per nation. Her best Individual result was seventh on the balance beam, but again she did not advance to the apparatus final (top 8), as she was the third Soviet (two gymnasts per nation was the limit for the apparatus finals). Her other results were ninth (uneven bars), 14th (vault) and 31st (floor). In 1988, she had not yet recovered from a hand fracture she received in 1987. Nevertheless, she was included on the team owing to her strong performance at the Olympic trials.

Baitova won a team silver medal and finished fourth in the all-around final at the 1987 World Championships. She also finished fourth in three of the four event finals; vault, uneven bars and floor exercise. She won a team gold medal the 1989 World Championships;

== Eponymous skills ==
Baitova was one of three gymnasts to successfully perform the double-twisting Yurchenko (DTY) vault at the 1987 World Championships, the first major FIG competition where it was performed. Contradicting naming conventions, the vault is currently named after her in the Code of Points despite the fact that Eugenia Golea and Elena Shushunova did the same vault successfully in the same phase of the same competition. She also has an eponymous balance beam mount.

Apparatus	Name	Description	Difficulty (Note: Valid for the 2025-2028 Code of Points)
Vault	Baitova	Round-off flic-flac on - stretched salto backward with 2/1 turn (720°) off	5.0
Balance beam	Baitova	Two flank circles followed by leg "Flair"	D (0.4)

== Retirement ==
She retired in 1990 and since 1991 works as gymnastics coach in Mogilev. In 1990, she married and gave birth to son Alex, but remarried later. In 2002, she was hired to coach in Qatar on a five-year contract, but returned after 11 months because she could not tolerate the hot climate.
