= Andrea Ladányi =

Hungarian gymnast (born 1969)

Personal information
- Nationality: Hungarian
- Born: 8 April 1969 (age 55); Budapest, Hungary

Sport
- Sport: Gymnastics

Andrea Ladányi (born 8 April 1969) is a Hungarian gymnast. She competed in six events at the 1988 Summer Olympics.
