= Iveta Poloková =

Czech gymnast

Personal information
- Nationality: Czech
- Born: 17 August 1970 (age 54); Frýdek-Místek, Czechoslovakia

Sport
- Sport: Gymnastics

Iveta Poloková (born 17 August 1970) is a Czech gymnast. She competed at the 1988 Summer Olympics and the 1992 Summer Olympics.
