= Irina Baraksanova =

Uzbek gymnast

Irina Baraksanova (born July 4, 1969, in Tashkent, Uzbek SSR, Soviet Union) is a former Soviet gymnast known for her participation in international competitions during the 1980s.

She initiated her gymnastics journey under the guidance of Valentina Borisova at the Spartak Club and later progressed to training in Moscow at the Central Army Sports Club with Viktor Razumovsky.

== Career ==
Baraksanova experienced success in both junior and senior levels of gymnastics competitions. She demonstrated her early potential by securing victory in the junior USSR Championships in 1979, leading to her recognition as a candidate for the title of master of sport.

=== Senior career highlights ===
Baraksanova won the all-around title at the Junior European Championships in 1984. In the same year, she placed second in uneven bars and third in balance beam at the Tokyo Cup and first in both vault and floor at the Moscow News.

Her career peaked in 1985 when she was part of the Soviet team that won gold in the team competition at the World Championships in Montreal. She also secured individual honours throughout her career, with victories and medals in the uneven bars, balance beam, and floor exercise categories.

=== Challenges and setbacks ===
In 1984, Baraksanova was named to the Soviet Olympic team but was unable to compete due to the Soviet-led boycott of the Los Angeles Olympic Games. Although she qualified for the all-around and uneven bars final at the 1985 World Championships, she did not compete in either final.

== Competitive results ==
- 1979: Jr. USSR Championships, 1st AA
- 1982: SKDA Championships, 2nd Team, 5th AA
- 1983: USSR Championships, 6th AA
- 1984: Jr. European Championships, 1st AA; USSR Cup, 6th AA; Moscow News, 2nd AA
- 1985: World Championships, 1st Team; USSR Cup, 2nd AA; Riga International, 2nd AA
- 1986: American Cup, 3rd AA; International Mixed Pairs, 1st Team; USA-USSR Dual Meet, 1st Team
