= Ulrike Klotz =

German gymnast

- Born: 15 November 1970 (age 55) Cottbus, East Germany

Gymnastics career
- Discipline: Women's artistic gymnastics
- Country represented: East Germany
Medal record
Olympic Games
Bronze medal – third place	1988 Seoul	Team
World Championships
Bronze medal – third place	1985 Montreal	Floor
Bronze medal – third place	1985 Montreal	Team
Bronze medal – third place	1987 Rotterdam	Team

Ulrike Klotz (born 15 November 1970 in Cottbus) is a former gymnast who competed for East Germany. She won a bronze medal in the floor exercise at the Montreal 1985 Worlds and also won team bronze, a feat the GDR team repeated at the World Championships in 1987 and at the 1988 Summer Olympic Games. In the Seoul Olympics, she qualified for the beam final, but fell three times and finished last. She ended her gymnastics career in 1989 due to injuries.

As of 2020, she is the only German to have ever won a World Championships medal on the floor apparatus.
