= Gabriele Fähnrich =

East German gymnast (born 1968)

- Born: 8 April 1968 (age 58)

Gymnastics career
- Discipline: Women's artistic gymnastics
- Country represented: East Germany
Medal record
Olympic Games
Bronze medal – third place	1988 Seoul	Team
World Championships
Gold medal – first place	1985 Montreal	Uneven bars
Bronze medal – third place	1983 Budapest	Team
Bronze medal – third place	1985 Montreal	Team
Bronze medal – third place	1987 Rotterdam	Team
Friendship Games
Silver medal – second place	1984 Olomouc	Team
Bronze medal – third place	1984 Olomouc	Uneven bars

Gabriele Fähnrich (born 8 April 1968) is a German former gymnast who represented East Germany (GDR). She is the 1985 World champion on the uneven bars. She also finished fourth in the all-around event at the 1985 World Championships, and won a bronze medal in the team event at the 1988 Olympic Games.

Born in Hoyerswerda, Saxony, Fähnrich's parents and sister Carola were also gymnasts. Fähnrich was nine when she went to the national training center in East-Berlin and stayed there for 11 years. She competed for the club Sportvereinigung Dynamo (Sports Club Dynamo).

== Problems with her coaches ==
In 2005 and 2006, Gabriele Fähnrich gave several interviews to German newspapers in which she told about her unhappy times in gymnastics and her many problems with the East German coaches.

The problems started in 1983, when Fähnrich was competing in Japan at the Chunichi Cup meet. During the competition, she wanted to make some photos, but had problems with her camera. A West-German gymnast, Brigitta Lehmann, who was also competing at this meet, saw that she had problems and went to her and offered her help, which Fähnrich accepted. This incident only happened a few minutes, but caused big problems for Fähnrich, because it was strictly forbidden for East Germans athletes to talk to West-Germans. After this meet, she was questioned about this incident by her coaches and later the Stasi, their reaction towards her was rude and they called her a liar.

In 1984, Fähnrich was selected for the 1984 Olympic team, but because of the boycott, she and her teammates stayed home.

In 1985 at the World Championships in Canada, she was very successful, she won a bronze medal with her team, was fourth in the All-around and became world-champion on uneven-bars.

Gabriele Fähnrich specialised on bars, her beam-routine was good but not great (she won the national beam-title in 1985, her only national title), but on floor and vault, she was weak, and that was something the GDR-coaches wanted to change after her success in Canada.

They made her train extra hard to learn new skills on floor and they wanted her to do a more difficult vault, however this new training method resulted in a knee-injury that was so bad that she couldn't compete in 1986 and it was necessary to have surgery on both knees.

Although not yet recovered from the surgery, the coaches wanted her to compete at the 1987 Worlds in Rotterdam. Because she was still not recovered, this meet was a disaster for Fähnrich, who was the worst gymnast of her team, although she scored a perfect 10.00 on bars during the team finals. Her coaches reacted furiously and refused to talk to her during their stay in Rotterdam.

== Doping and the 1988 Olympics ==
In 1988, almost every female elite gymnast in East Germany was injured, most of them badly. Fähnrich, together with club-mates Dagmar Kersten and Ulrike Klotz became part of the doping-program of the GDR-Sport system. To make their bodies stronger, they were given doping, which had a disastrous effect on Fähnrich's body: she started to gain a lot of weight and had to stop with the programme. The coaches gave up on her and three weeks before the Olympics, they wanted to send her home.

At the national training centre, she was given a last chance: She had to lose several pounds in three days, which she did by only eating one apple a day and using a lot of laxatives, which gave her gruesome stomach-pains.

At the Olympics in Seoul, Fähnrich won a bronze medal in the team competition. She placed 25th overall, but did not advance to the All Around final (Top 36) because only three gymnasts per nation were able to compete and she was the fourth ranked East German behind Dagmar Kersten (8th), Dörte Thümmler (11th) and Ulrike Klotz (16th). Her other Individual results at the Seoul Olympics were 15th (uneven bars), 22nd (balance beam), 38th (vault) and 45th (floor).

== After the Olympics ==
After the Olympics, Fähnrich not only retired from gymnastics, but she also didn't want to have anything to do with gymnastics any more. She married and became a beautician. In 1990, she had a daughter. Her daughter did gymnastics for a while and when the coaches told Fähnrich that her daughter was a talent, she took her daughter away from gymnastics and she took her to a karate-club instead.

She currently sits on the board of the Citizens Center Hohenschönhausen.
