= Yelena Shushunova =

Soviet Russian gymnast (1969–2018)

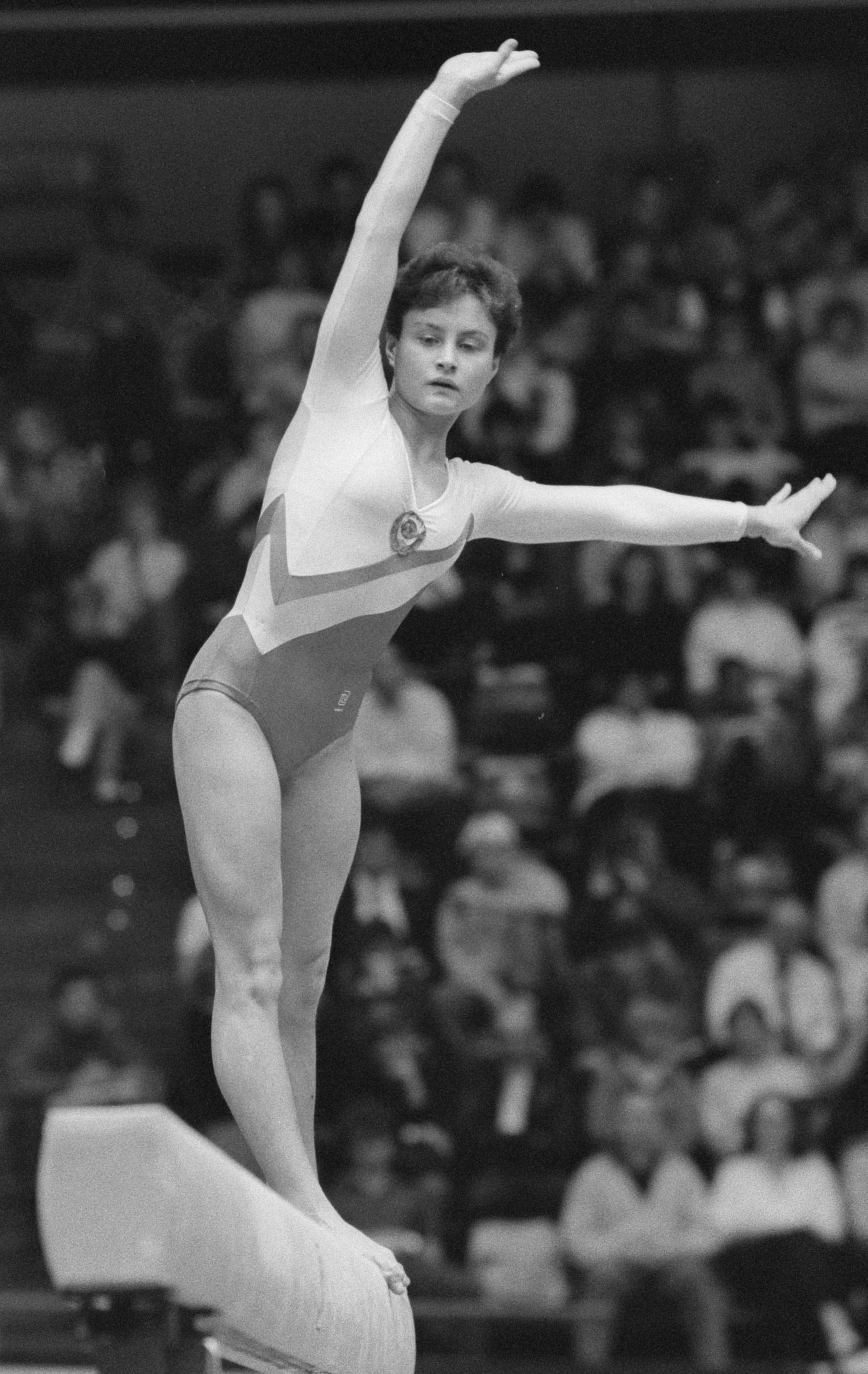
- Shushunova in 1987

Personal information
- Full name: Yelena Lvovna Shushunova
- Alternative name: Elena Shushunova
- Born: 23 May 1969 Leningrad, Russian SFSR, Soviet Union
- Died: 16 August 2018 (aged 49) Saint Petersburg, Russia
- Height: 1.47 m (4 ft 10 in)

Gymnastics career
- Discipline: Women's artistic gymnastics
- Country represented: Soviet Union; (1981–88 (URS))
- Club: SKA St. Petersburg
- Music: Two Guitars – Russian Gypsy Music
- Eponymous skills: floor: straddle pike landing in planche; uneven bars: Swing forward with half turn – further half turn to counter straddle in flight over high bar
- Retired: 25 September 1988
Medal record
Representing Soviet Union
Olympic Games
| Gold medal – first place | 1988 Seoul | Team |
| Gold medal – first place | 1988 Seoul | All-around |
| Silver medal – second place | 1988 Seoul | Balance beam |
| Bronze medal – third place | 1988 Seoul | Uneven bars |
World Championships
| Gold medal – first place | 1985 Montreal | Team |
| Gold medal – first place | 1985 Montreal | All-around |
| Gold medal – first place | 1985 Montreal | Vault |
| Gold medal – first place | 1987 Rotterdam | Vault |
| Gold medal – first place | 1987 Rotterdam | Floor exercise |
| Silver medal – second place | 1985 Montreal | Floor exercise |
| Silver medal – second place | 1987 Rotterdam | Team |
| Silver medal – second place | 1987 Rotterdam | All-around |
| Silver medal – second place | 1987 Rotterdam | Balance beam |
| Bronze medal – third place | 1985 Montreal | Balance beam |
| Bronze medal – third place | 1987 Rotterdam | Uneven bars |
World Cup Final
| Gold medal – first place | 1986 Beijing | All-around |
| Gold medal – first place | 1986 Beijing | Vault |
| Gold medal – first place | 1986 Beijing | Uneven bars |
| Gold medal – first place | 1986 Beijing | Floor exercise |
| Bronze medal – third place | 1986 Beijing | Balance beam |
Goodwill Games
| Gold medal – first place | 1986 Moscow | Team |
| Gold medal – first place | 1986 Moscow | Vault |
| Gold medal – first place | 1986 Moscow | Uneven Bars |
| Gold medal – first place | 1986 Moscow | Floor Exercise |
| Silver medal – second place | 1986 Moscow | All-Around |
| Silver medal – second place | 1986 Moscow | Balance Beam |
European Championships
| Gold medal – first place | 1985 Helsinki | All-around |
| Gold medal – first place | 1985 Helsinki | Vault |
| Gold medal – first place | 1985 Helsinki | Uneven bars |
| Gold medal – first place | 1985 Helsinki | Floor exercise |
| Gold medal – first place | 1987 Moscow | Vault |
| Bronze medal – third place | 1985 Helsinki | Balance beam |
| Bronze medal – third place | 1987 Moscow | All-around |
Friendship Games
| Gold medal – first place | 1984 Olomouc | Team |
| Bronze medal – third place | 1984 Olomouc | All-around |

Yelena Lvovna Shushunova (Russian: Елена Львовна Шушунова; sometimes spelled Elena Shushunova; 23 May 1969 – 16 August 2018) was a Soviet Russian gymnast. Shushunova was one of five women (alongside Larisa Latynina, Věra Čáslavská, Ludmilla Tourischeva and Lilia Podkopayeva) who have won all-around titles at all major competitions: Olympics, World Championships and European/Continental Championships and one of eleven women who medaled on every event at World Championships. Shushunova was renowned for pioneering complex skills as well as her explosive and dynamic tumbling and high consistency.

== Junior career ==
Shushunova was born and grew up in Leningrad and began gymnastics when she was approximately six or seven years old. She began competing as a junior gymnast in 1981. In 1982, she won gold medals at the 1982 Moscow News (now known as Moscow Stars of the World) and the Junior European Championships. In 1983, she won the USSR Cup, which she won every year until 1988 with the exception of 1984.

== Senior career ==
Shushunova was named as a member of the Soviet national gymnastics team in 1984, but was unable to compete at the 1984 Summer Olympics as the Soviet Union boycotted the Olympics. Instead, she competed at the 1984 Friendship Games in Olomouc, Czechoslovakia, where she finished third all around and helped the USSR to a gold in the team event.

The following year Shushunova made her breakthrough by winning the all-around title at the European Championships. She also won three gold medals in the event finals on vault, floor exercise, and uneven bars (which she shared with East German Olympian Maxi Gnauck). At the World Championships she won five medals including the all-around title, which she held alongside teammate Oksana Omelianchik. She took first on vault, second on floor and third on beam. In her floor exercise she tumbled a double layout, and side Arabian 1 and 3/4 salto, both were rare skills for women at that time and women are no longer allowed to compete saltos which end in a roll. She also displayed her signature skill, a straddle jump to prone support.

Shushunova's dominance in women's gymnastics continued at the 1986 World Cup in Beijing. There she won the all-around, vault, uneven bars, and floor exercise titles. In this competition she displayed an increased level of difficulty on two apparatus, showing a Rulfova flic (full twisting Korbut flic) on balance beam and a tucked full in double salto dismount on the uneven bars. At the 1986 Goodwill Games she led the Soviet team to a gold medal, but then fell twice in the all-around finals to finish second to teammate Vera Kolesnikova. She rallied in the event finals to take, once again, the vault, bars, and floor golds and the beam silver.

In 1987, Shushunova lost the European title to Romanian Daniela Silivaș due to a fall on a double layout dismount from the uneven bars. At the European Championships she earned a bronze in the all-around and a gold on vault. She continued to show increased difficulty on all apparatus by competing a double layout dismount on the uneven bars, a layout Thomas salto on floor, and a full in dismount on beam. Later that year her team lost the World Championships team title, placing second to the Romanian team. Shushunova also lost the world title to Romanian Aurelia Dobre, finishing in second place. In the event finals she retained her vault title with her textbook Yurchenko full and Yurchenko 1.5, beating Romanian Eugenia Golea. She also earned a bronze medal on the uneven bars. Shushunova also earned silver on balance beam and tied with Daniela Silivas for gold on floor exercise.

=== 1988 Olympics ===
In 1988, Shushunova competed at the Summer Olympics in Seoul. She scored three perfect scores of 10 in optional events and won the individual all-around and team event titles. She also won silver on balance beam and bronze on uneven bars. Shushunova fell on a double twisting Yurchenko on vault and failed to medal. She also failed to medal on floor exercise due to stumbling out of the landing of her opening full-in double back and falling out of her arabian 1 3/4 salto.

=== Later life ===
Shushunova retired from competition two months after the 1988 Olympics and later returned to her home city of Saint Petersburg, where she worked for the city's sports committee. She helped organise the gymnastics events of the 1994 Goodwill Games and 1998 European Championships, both of which were held in Saint Petersburg.

In 2004, she was inducted into the International Gymnastics Hall of Fame. In the following year, she was inducted into the International Jewish Sports Hall of Fame.

=== Eponymous skills ===
Shushunova has two eponymous skills named after her in the Code of Points.

| Apparatus | Name | Description | Difficulty (Note: Valid for the 2025–2028 Code of Points) | Notes |
|---|---|---|---|---|
| Uneven bars | Shushunova | Swing forward with half turn – further half turn to counter straddle in flight over high bar | E (0.5) | |
| Balance beam/floor | Shushunova | Jump with stretched hips to planche (minimum 40 degree angle) | C (0.3)/A (0.1) | |

== Death ==
Shushunova died from complications of pneumonia on 16 August 2018. She was 49.

== Competitive history ==
| Year | Event | Team | AA | VT | UB | BB | FX |
Junior
| 1980 | Junior USSR Championships | | 3rd place, bronze medalist(s) | 2nd place, silver medalist(s) | 3rd place, bronze medalist(s) | | |
| 1980 | Junior USSR Cup | | 6 | | | | |
| 1981 | Kosice International | | 6 | 5 | 1st place, gold medalist(s) | | 2nd place, silver medalist(s) |
| 1981 | Riga International | | 4 | | | | 1st place, gold medalist(s) |
| 1981 | Ostrava International | | | | | | 3rd place, bronze medalist(s) |
1982
| 1982 | Junior European Championships | | 15 | | | | 1st place, gold medalist(s) |
| 1982 | Moscow News | | 2nd place, silver medalist(s) | | | | 1st place, gold medalist(s) |
Senior
| 1983 | Chunichi Cup | | 2nd place, silver medalist(s) | | | | |
| 1983 | East Bloc Spartikade | | 3rd place, bronze medalist(s) | | | | |
| 1983 | Tokyo Cup | | | | | 1st place, gold medalist(s) | 2nd place, silver medalist(s) |
| 1983 | USSR Championships | | 3rd place, bronze medalist(s) | | 2nd place, silver medalist(s) | 4 | 1st place, gold medalist(s) |
| 1983 | USSR Cup | | 1st place, gold medalist(s) | | | | |
| 1983 | USSR Spartikade | | 3rd place, bronze medalist(s) | | 2nd place, silver medalist(s) | | |
| 1984 | Chunichi Cup | | 2nd place, silver medalist(s) | 1st place, gold medalist(s) | | 1st place, gold medalist(s) | 1st place, gold medalist(s) |
| 1984 | Moscow News | | 2nd place, silver medalist(s) | | 2nd place, silver medalist(s) | 2nd place, silver medalist(s) | |
| 1984 | Tokyo Cup | | | 1st place, gold medalist(s) | | | 1st place, gold medalist(s) |
| 1984 | USSR Junior Championships | | | 1st place, gold medalist(s) | 3rd place, bronze medalist(s) | | 1st place, gold medalist(s) |
| 1984 | USSR Championships | | | 6 | | | |
| 1984 | USSR Cup | | 3rd place, bronze medalist(s) | | | | |
| 1984 | Friendship Games | 1st place, gold medalist(s) | 3rd place, bronze medalist(s) | | | | 8 |
1985
| 1985 | European Championships | | 1st place, gold medalist(s) | 1st place, gold medalist(s) | 1st place, gold medalist(s) | 3rd place, bronze medalist(s) | 1st place, gold medalist(s) |
| 1985 | Moscow News | | 1st place, gold medalist(s) | 1st place, gold medalist(s) | 2nd place, silver medalist(s) | 2nd place, silver medalist(s) | |
| 1985 | USSR Championships | | 2nd place, silver medalist(s) | 1st place, gold medalist(s) | 1st place, gold medalist(s) | | 1st place, gold medalist(s) |
| 1985 | USSR Cup | | 1st place, gold medalist(s) | 1st place, gold medalist(s) | 1st place, gold medalist(s) | | 1st place, gold medalist(s) |
| 1985 | World Championships | 1st place, gold medalist(s) | 1st place, gold medalist(s) | 1st place, gold medalist(s) | | 3rd place, bronze medalist(s) | 2nd place, silver medalist(s) |
| 1986 | Goodwill Games | 1st place, gold medalist(s) | 2nd place, silver medalist(s) | 1st place, gold medalist(s) | 2nd place, silver medalist(s) | | 1st place, gold medalist(s) |
| 1986 | USSR Cup | | 1st place, gold medalist(s) | | | | |
| 1986 | World Cup Final | | 1st place, gold medalist(s) | 1st place, gold medalist(s) | 1st place, gold medalist(s) | 3rd place, bronze medalist(s) | 1st place, gold medalist(s) |
1987
| 1987 | European Championships | | 3rd place, bronze medalist(s) | 1st place, gold medalist(s) | | 4 | |
| 1987 | Summer Universiade | 1st place, gold medalist(s) | 1st place, gold medalist(s) | 1st place, gold medalist(s) | 1st place, gold medalist(s) | 1st place, gold medalist(s) | 1st place, gold medalist(s) |
| 1987 | USSR Championships | | 1st place, gold medalist(s) | 2nd place, silver medalist(s) | 1st place, gold medalist(s) | 3rd place, bronze medalist(s) | 2nd place, silver medalist(s) |
| 1987 | USSR Cup | | 1st place, gold medalist(s) | 2nd place, silver medalist(s) | 1st place, gold medalist(s) | 3rd place, bronze medalist(s) | 2nd place, silver medalist(s) |
| 1987 | World Championships | 2nd place, silver medalist(s) | 2nd place, silver medalist(s) | 1st place, gold medalist(s) | 3rd place, bronze medalist(s) | 2nd place, silver medalist(s) | 1st place, gold medalist(s) |
| 1988 | French International | | 1st place, gold medalist(s) | | | | |
| 1988 | Moscow News | | 1st place, gold medalist(s) | | 1st place, gold medalist(s) | 1st place, gold medalist(s) | 6 |
| 1988 | USSR Championships | | 2nd place, silver medalist(s) | 2nd place, silver medalist(s) | 1st place, gold medalist(s) | 1st place, gold medalist(s) | |
| 1988 | USSR Cup | | 1st place, gold medalist(s) | | | | |
| 1988 | Olympic Games | 1st place, gold medalist(s) | 1st place, gold medalist(s) | 8 | 3rd place, bronze medalist(s) | 2nd place, silver medalist(s) | 7 |
| 1991 | World Professional Championships | | | 3rd place, bronze medalist(s) | 3rd place, bronze medalist(s) | | 1st place, gold medalist(s) |

== See also ==
- List of select Jewish gymnasts
- List of top female medalists at the World Artistic Gymnastics Championships
