= Soviet Union at the World Artistic Gymnastics Championships =

Gymnastics Championships

- Flag of the Soviet Union
- ISO: URS
- Medals: Gold 111 Silver 86 Bronze 59 Total 256

Appearances
- 14; 1954, 1958, 1962, 1966, 1970, 1974, 1978, 1979, 1981, 1983, 1985, 1987, 1989, 1991

CIS at the World Artistic Gymnastics Championships
- Flag of the CIS
- ISO: CIS
- Medals: Gold 5 Silver 3 Bronze 5 Total 13

Appearances
- 1; 1992

The Soviet Union didn't compete at the World Artistic Gymnastics Championships until 1954. Despite it being their first appearance they dominated the competition, winning gold in both team events and winning 20 total medals. The Soviet Union competed for the last time at the 1991 World Championships as the Soviet Union; the following year they competed as the Commonwealth of Independent States and in 1993 athletes from former Soviet member states officially began competing under their own flags.

== Medalists ==
Medal	Name	Year	Event
Gold	Albert Azaryan, Viktor Chukarin, Sergei Dzhayani, Yevgeny Korolkov, Valentin Muratov, Hrant Shahinyan, Boris Shakhlin, Ivan Vostrikov	(Italy) 1954 Rome	Men's team
Gold	Nina Bocharova, Pelageya Danilova, Maria Gorokhovskaya, Larisa Diriy, Tamara Manina, Sofia Muratova, Galina Rud'ko, Galina Sarabidze	(Italy) 1954 Rome	Women's team
Gold	Viktor Chukarin	(Italy) 1954 Rome	Men's all-around
Gold	Valentin Muratov	(Italy) 1954 Rome	Men's all-around
Bronze	Hrant Shahinyan	(Italy) 1954 Rome	Men's all-around
Gold	Galina Rud'ko	(Italy) 1954 Rome	Women's all-around
Gold	Valentin Muratov	(Italy) 1954 Rome	Men's floor exercise
Gold	Tamara Manina	(Italy) 1954 Rome	Women's vault
Gold	Hrant Shahinyan	(Italy) 1954 Rome	Men's pommel horse
Bronze	Viktor Chukarin	(Italy) 1954 Rome	Men's pommel horse
Silver	Galina Rud'ko	(Italy) 1954 Rome	Women's uneven bars
Gold	Albert Azaryan	(Italy) 1954 Rome	Men's rings
Silver	Yevgeny Korolkov	(Italy) 1954 Rome	Men's rings
Bronze	Valentin Muratov	(Italy) 1954 Rome	Men's rings
Bronze	Sergei Dzhayani	(Italy) 1954 Rome	Men's vault
Gold	Viktor Chukarin	(Italy) 1954 Rome	Men's parallel bars
Gold	Tamara Manina	(Italy) 1954 Rome	Women's floor exercise
Bronze	Maria Gorokhovskaya	(Italy) 1954 Rome	Women's floor exercise
Gold	Valentin Muratov	(Italy) 1954 Rome	Men's horizontal bar
Silver	Boris Shakhlin	(Italy) 1954 Rome	Men's horizontal bar
Gold	Albert Azaryan, Valentin Lipatov, Valentin Muratov, Boris Shakhlin, Pavel Stolbov, Yuri Titov	(Soviet Union) 1958 Moscow	Men's team
Gold	Polina Astakhova, Raisa Borisova, Lidiya Kalinina, Larisa Latynina, Tamara Manina, Sofia Muratova	(Soviet Union) 1958 Moscow	Women's team
Gold	Boris Shakhlin	(Soviet Union) 1958 Moscow	Men's all-around
Bronze	Yuri Titov	(Soviet Union) 1958 Moscow	Men's all-around
Gold	Larisa Latynina	(Soviet Union) 1958 Moscow	Women's all-around
Bronze	Tamara Manina	(Soviet Union) 1958 Moscow	Women's all-around
Bronze	Yuri Titov	(Soviet Union) 1958 Moscow	Men's floor exercise
Gold	Larisa Latynina	(Soviet Union) 1958 Moscow	Women's vault
Silver	Sofia Muratova	(Soviet Union) 1958 Moscow	Women's vault
Silver	Lidiya Kalinina	(Soviet Union) 1958 Moscow	Women's vault
Silver	Tamara Manina	(Soviet Union) 1958 Moscow	Women's vault
Gold	Boris Shakhlin	(Soviet Union) 1958 Moscow	Men's pommel horse
Silver	Pavel Stolbov	(Soviet Union) 1958 Moscow	Men's pommel horse
Gold	Larisa Latynina	(Soviet Union) 1958 Moscow	Women's uneven bars
Bronze	Polina Astakhova	(Soviet Union) 1958 Moscow	Women's uneven bars
Gold	Albert Azaryan	(Soviet Union) 1958 Moscow	Men's rings
Bronze	Yuri Titov	(Soviet Union) 1958 Moscow	Men's rings
Gold	Yuri Titov	(Soviet Union) 1958 Moscow	Men's vault
Gold	Larisa Latynina	(Soviet Union) 1958 Moscow	Women's balance beam
Silver	Sofia Muratova	(Soviet Union) 1958 Moscow	Women's balance beam
Gold	Boris Shakhlin	(Soviet Union) 1958 Moscow	Men's parallel bars
Bronze	Pavel Stolbov	(Soviet Union) 1958 Moscow	Men's parallel bars
Silver	Larisa Latynina	(Soviet Union) 1958 Moscow	Women's floor exercise
Gold	Boris Shakhlin	(Soviet Union) 1958 Moscow	Men's horizontal bar
Silver	Albert Azaryan	(Soviet Union) 1958 Moscow	Men's horizontal bar
Bronze	Yuri Titov	(Soviet Union) 1958 Moscow	Men's horizontal bar
Silver	Valery Kerdemelidi, Viktor Leontyev, Viktor Lisitsky, Boris Shakhlin, Pavel Stolbov, Yuri Titov	(Czechoslovakia) 1962 Prague	Men's team
Gold	Polina Astakhova, Lidiya Ivanova, Larisa Latynina, Tamara Manina, Sofia Muratova, Irina Pervuschina	(Czechoslovakia) 1962 Prague	Women's team
Gold	Yuri Titov	(Czechoslovakia) 1962 Prague	Men's all-around
Bronze	Boris Shakhlin	(Czechoslovakia) 1962 Prague	Men's all-around
Gold	Larisa Latynina	(Czechoslovakia) 1962 Prague	Women's all-around
Bronze	Irina Pervuschina	(Czechoslovakia) 1962 Prague	Women's all-around
Silver	Larisa Latynina	(Czechoslovakia) 1962 Prague	Women's vault
Bronze	Tamara Manina	(Czechoslovakia) 1962 Prague	Women's vault
Silver	Boris Shakhlin	(Czechoslovakia) 1962 Prague	Men's pommel horse
Gold	Irina Pervuschina	(Czechoslovakia) 1962 Prague	Women's uneven bars
Bronze	Larisa Latynina	(Czechoslovakia) 1962 Prague	Women's uneven bars
Gold	Yuri Titov	(Czechoslovakia) 1962 Prague	Men's rings
Silver	Boris Shakhlin	(Czechoslovakia) 1962 Prague	Men's rings
Bronze	Boris Shakhlin	(Czechoslovakia) 1962 Prague	Men's vault
Silver	Larisa Latynina	(Czechoslovakia) 1962 Prague	Women's balance beam
Silver	Boris Shakhlin	(Czechoslovakia) 1962 Prague	Men's parallel bars
Gold	Larisa Latynina	(Czechoslovakia) 1962 Prague	Women's floor exercise
Silver	Irina Pervuschina	(Czechoslovakia) 1962 Prague	Women's floor exercise
Silver	Pavel Stolbov	(Czechoslovakia) 1962 Prague	Men's horizontal bar
Silver	Mikhail Voronin, Sergei Diomidov, Valery Kerdemelidi, Yuri Titov, Valery Karasev, Boris Shakhlin	(West Germany) 1966 Dortmund	Men's team
Silver	Natalia Kuchinskaya, Larisa Petrik, Zinaida Druzhinina, Larisa Latynina, Polina Astakhova, Olga Kharlova	(West Germany) 1966 Dortmund	Women's team
Gold	Mikhail Voronin	(West Germany) 1966 Dortmund	Men's all-around
Silver	Natalia Kuchinskaya	(West Germany) 1966 Dortmund	Women's all-around
Bronze	Natalia Kuchinskaya	(West Germany) 1966 Dortmund	Women's vault
Silver	Mikhail Voronin	(West Germany) 1966 Dortmund	Men's pommel horse
Gold	Natalia Kuchinskaya	(West Germany) 1966 Dortmund	Women's uneven bars
Gold	Mikhail Voronin	(West Germany) 1966 Dortmund	Men's rings
Gold	Natalia Kuchinskaya	(West Germany) 1966 Dortmund	Women's balance beam
Bronze	Larisa Petrik	(West Germany) 1966 Dortmund	Women's balance beam
Gold	Sergei Diomidov	(West Germany) 1966 Dortmund	Men's parallel bars
Silver	Mikhail Voronin	(West Germany) 1966 Dortmund	Men's parallel bars
Gold	Natalia Kuchinskaya	(West Germany) 1966 Dortmund	Women's floor exercise
Bronze	Zinaida Druzhinina	(West Germany) 1966 Dortmund	Women's floor exercise
Silver	Mikhail Voronin, Viktor Klimenko, Sergei Diomidov, Viktor Lisitsky, German Bogdanov, Valery Karasyov	(Socialist Federal Republic of Yugoslavia) 1970 Ljubljana	Men's team
Gold	Lyubov Burda, Olga Karaseva, Tamara Lazakovich, Larisa Petrik, Ludmilla Tourischeva, Zinaida Voronina	(Socialist Federal Republic of Yugoslavia) 1970 Ljubljana	Women's team
Gold	Ludmilla Tourischeva	(Socialist Federal Republic of Yugoslavia) 1970 Ljubljana	Women's all-around
Bronze	Zinaida Voronina	(Socialist Federal Republic of Yugoslavia) 1970 Ljubljana	Women's all-around
Bronze	Lyubov Burda	(Socialist Federal Republic of Yugoslavia) 1970 Ljubljana	Women's vault
Bronze	Ludmilla Tourischeva	(Socialist Federal Republic of Yugoslavia) 1970 Ljubljana	Women's vault
Bronze	Viktor Klimenko	(Socialist Federal Republic of Yugoslavia) 1970 Ljubljana	Men's pommel horse
Silver	Ludmilla Tourischeva	(Socialist Federal Republic of Yugoslavia) 1970 Ljubljana	Women's uneven bars
Bronze	Zinaida Voronina	(Socialist Federal Republic of Yugoslavia) 1970 Ljubljana	Women's uneven bars
Bronze	Mikhail Voronin	(Socialist Federal Republic of Yugoslavia) 1970 Ljubljana	Men's rings
Silver	Viktor Klimenko	(Socialist Federal Republic of Yugoslavia) 1970 Ljubljana	Men's vault
Bronze	Larisa Petrik	(Socialist Federal Republic of Yugoslavia) 1970 Ljubljana	Women's balance beam
Silver	Mikhail Voronin	(Socialist Federal Republic of Yugoslavia) 1970 Ljubljana	Men's parallel bars
Gold	Ludmilla Tourischeva	(Socialist Federal Republic of Yugoslavia) 1970 Ljubljana	Women's floor exercise
Silver	Olga Karaseva	(Socialist Federal Republic of Yugoslavia) 1970 Ljubljana	Women's floor exercise
Bronze	Zinaida Voronina	(Socialist Federal Republic of Yugoslavia) 1970 Ljubljana	Women's floor exercise
Silver	Nikolai Andrianov, Edvard Mikaelian, Vladimir Marchenko, Paata Shamugiya, Vladimir Safronov, Viktor Klimenko	(Bulgaria) 1974 Varna	Men's team
Gold	Ludmilla Tourischeva, Olga Korbut, Elvira Saadi, Rusudan Sikharulidze, Nina Dronova, Nellie Kim	(Bulgaria) 1974 Varna	Women's team
Silver	Nikolai Andrianov	(Bulgaria) 1974 Varna	Men's all-around
Gold	Ludmilla Tourischeva	(Bulgaria) 1974 Varna	Women's all-around
Silver	Olga Korbut	(Bulgaria) 1974 Varna	Women's all-around
Gold	Olga Korbut	(Bulgaria) 1974 Varna	Women's vault
Silver	Ludmilla Tourischeva	(Bulgaria) 1974 Varna	Women's vault
Silver	Nikolai Andrianov	(Bulgaria) 1974 Varna	Men's pommel horse
Silver	Olga Korbut	(Bulgaria) 1974 Varna	Women's uneven bars
Bronze	Ludmilla Tourischeva	(Bulgaria) 1974 Varna	Women's uneven bars
Gold	Nikolai Andrianov	(Bulgaria) 1974 Varna	Men's rings
Silver	Nikolai Andrianov	(Bulgaria) 1974 Varna	Men's vault
Gold	Ludmilla Tourischeva	(Bulgaria) 1974 Varna	Women's balance beam
Silver	Olga Korbut	(Bulgaria) 1974 Varna	Women's balance beam
Bronze	Nellie Kim	(Bulgaria) 1974 Varna	Women's balance beam
Silver	Nikolai Andrianov	(Bulgaria) 1974 Varna	Men's parallel bars
Bronze	Vladimir Marchenko	(Bulgaria) 1974 Varna	Men's parallel bars
Gold	Ludmilla Tourischeva	(Bulgaria) 1974 Varna	Women's floor exercise
Silver	Olga Korbut	(Bulgaria) 1974 Varna	Women's floor exercise
Bronze	Elvira Saadi	(Bulgaria) 1974 Varna	Women's floor exercise
Bronze	Rusudan Siharulidze	(Bulgaria) 1974 Varna	Women's floor exercise
Silver	Nikolai Andrianov, Eduard Azarian, Alexander Dityatin, Gennady Krysin, Vladimir Markelov, Aleksandr Tkachyov	(France) 1978 Strasbourg	Men's team
Gold	Maria Filatova, Natalia Shaposhnikova, Elena Mukhina, Nellie Kim, Svetlana Agapova, Tatiana Arzhannikova	(France) 1978 Strasbourg	Women's team
Gold	Nikolai Andrianov	(France) 1978 Strasbourg	Men's all-around
Bronze	Alexander Dityatin	(France) 1978 Strasbourg	Men's all-around
Gold	Elena Mukhina	(France) 1978 Strasbourg	Women's all-around
Silver	Nellie Kim	(France) 1978 Strasbourg	Women's all-around
Bronze	Natalia Shaposhnikova	(France) 1978 Strasbourg	Women's all-around
Bronze	Alexander Dityatin	(France) 1978 Strasbourg	Men's floor exercise
Gold	Nellie Kim	(France) 1978 Strasbourg	Women's vault
Silver	Elena Mukhina	(France) 1978 Strasbourg	Women's uneven bars
Gold	Nikolai Andrianov	(France) 1978 Strasbourg	Men's rings
Silver	Alexander Dityatin	(France) 1978 Strasbourg	Men's rings
Silver	Nikolai Andrianov	(France) 1978 Strasbourg	Men's vault
Silver	Elena Mukhina	(France) 1978 Strasbourg	Women's balance beam
Silver	Nikolai Andrianov	(France) 1978 Strasbourg	Men's parallel bars
Gold	Nellie Kim	(France) 1978 Strasbourg	Women's floor exercise
Gold	Elena Mukhina	(France) 1978 Strasbourg	Women's floor exercise
Bronze	Gennady Krysin	(France) 1978 Strasbourg	Men's horizontal bar
Gold	Alexander Dityatin, Aleksandr Tkachyov, Vladimir Markelov, Nikolai Andrianov, Bogdan Makuts, Artur Akopyan	(United States) 1979 Fort Worth	Men's team
Silver	Maria Filatova, Nellie Kim, Elena Naimushina, Natalia Shaposhnikova, Natalia Tereschenko, Stella Zakharova	(United States) 1979 Fort Worth	Women's team
Gold	Alexander Dityatin	(United States) 1979 Fort Worth	Men's all-around
Bronze	Aleksandr Tkachyov	(United States) 1979 Fort Worth	Men's all-around
Gold	Nellie Kim	(United States) 1979 Fort Worth	Women's all-around
Bronze	Aleksandr Tkachyov	(United States) 1979 Fort Worth	Men's floor exercise
Silver	Stella Zakharova	(United States) 1979 Fort Worth	Women's vault
Bronze	Nellie Kim	(United States) 1979 Fort Worth	Women's vault
Gold	Alexander Dityatin	(United States) 1979 Fort Worth	Men's rings
Bronze	Aleksandr Tkachyov	(United States) 1979 Fort Worth	Men's rings
Gold	Alexander Dityatin	(United States) 1979 Fort Worth	Men's vault
Silver	Nikolai Andrianov	(United States) 1979 Fort Worth	Men's vault
Silver	Nellie Kim	(United States) 1979 Fort Worth	Women's balance beam
Silver	Aleksandr Tkachyov	(United States) 1979 Fort Worth	Men's parallel bars
Silver	Nellie Kim	(United States) 1979 Fort Worth	Women's floor exercise
Silver	Aleksandr Tkachyov	(United States) 1979 Fort Worth	Men's horizontal bar
Bronze	Alexander Dityatin	(United States) 1979 Fort Worth	Men's horizontal bar
Gold	Yuri Korolev, Bogdan Makuts, Alexander Dityatin, Aleksandr Tkachyov, Artur Akopyan, Pavel Sut	(Soviet Union) 1981 Moscow	Men's team
Gold	Elena Davydova, Olga Bicherova, Maria Filatova, Stella Zakharova, Elena Polevaya, Natalia Ilienko	(Soviet Union) 1981 Moscow	Women's team
Gold	Yuri Korolev	(Soviet Union) 1981 Moscow	Men's all-around
Silver	Bogdan Makuts	(Soviet Union) 1981 Moscow	Men's all-around
Gold	Olga Bicherova	(Soviet Union) 1981 Moscow	Women's all-around
Silver	Maria Filatova	(Soviet Union) 1981 Moscow	Women's all-around
Bronze	Elena Davydova	(Soviet Union) 1981 Moscow	Women's all-around
Gold	Yuri Korolev	(Soviet Union) 1981 Moscow	Men's floor exercise
Silver	Stella Zakharova	(Soviet Union) 1981 Moscow	Women's vault
Bronze	Yuri Korolev	(Soviet Union) 1981 Moscow	Men's pommel horse
Bronze	Elena Davydova	(Soviet Union) 1981 Moscow	Women's uneven bars
Gold	Alexander Dityatin	(Soviet Union) 1981 Moscow	Men's rings
Bronze	Bogdan Makuts	(Soviet Union) 1981 Moscow	Men's rings
Silver	Artur Akopyan	(Soviet Union) 1981 Moscow	Men's vault
Bronze	Bogdan Makuts	(Soviet Union) 1981 Moscow	Men's vault
Gold	Alexander Dityatin	(Soviet Union) 1981 Moscow	Men's parallel bars
Gold	Natalia Ilienko	(Soviet Union) 1981 Moscow	Women's floor exercise
Silver	Elena Davydova	(Soviet Union) 1981 Moscow	Women's floor exercise
Gold	Aleksandr Tkachyov	(Soviet Union) 1981 Moscow	Men's horizontal bar
Silver	Artur Akopyan	(Soviet Union) 1981 Moscow	Men's horizontal bar
Silver	Dmitry Bilozerchev, Artur Akopyan, Alexander Pogorelov, Vladimir Artemov, Yury Korolev, Bogdan Makuts	(Hungary) 1983 Budapest	Men's team
Gold	Olga Bicherova, Tatiana Frolova, Olga Mostepanova, Natalia Ilienko, Albina Shishova, Natalia Yurchenko	(Hungary) 1983 Budapest	Women's team
Gold	Dmitry Bilozerchev	(Hungary) 1983 Budapest	Men's all-around
Bronze	Artur Akopyan	(Hungary) 1983 Budapest	Men's all-around
Gold	Natalia Yurchenko	(Hungary) 1983 Budapest	Women's all-around
Silver	Olga Mostepanova	(Hungary) 1983 Budapest	Women's all-around
Silver	Dmitry Bilozerchev	(Hungary) 1983 Budapest	Men's floor exercise
Gold	Dmitry Bilozerchev	(Hungary) 1983 Budapest	Men's pommel horse
Gold	Dmitry Bilozerchev	(Hungary) 1983 Budapest	Men's rings
Gold	Artur Akopyan	(Hungary) 1983 Budapest	Men's vault
Gold	Olga Mostepanova	(Hungary) 1983 Budapest	Women's balance beam
Gold	Vladimir Artemov	(Hungary) 1983 Budapest	Men's parallel bars
Silver	Olga Mostepanova	(Hungary) 1983 Budapest	Women's floor exercise
Gold	Dmitry Bilozerchev	(Hungary) 1983 Budapest	Men's horizontal bar
Silver	Alexander Pogorelov	(Hungary) 1983 Budapest	Men's horizontal bar
Gold	Vladimir Artemov, Yuri Korolev, Valentin Mogilny, Yury Balabanov, Aleksei Tikhonkikh, Aleksandr Tumilovich	(Canada) 1985 Montreal	Men's team
Gold	Irina Baraksanova, Vera Kolesnikova, Olga Mostepanova, Oksana Omelianchik, Yelena Shushunova, Natalia Yurchenko	(Canada) 1985 Montreal	Women's team
Gold	Yuri Korolev	(Canada) 1985 Montreal	Men's all-around
Silver	Vladimir Artemov	(Canada) 1985 Montreal	Men's all-around
Gold	Oksana Omelianchik	(Canada) 1985 Montreal	Women's all-around
Gold	Yelena Shushunova	(Canada) 1985 Montreal	Women's all-around
Silver	Yuri Korolev	(Canada) 1985 Montreal	Men's floor exercise
Gold	Yelena Shushunova	(Canada) 1985 Montreal	Women's vault
Gold	Valentin Mogilny	(Canada) 1985 Montreal	Men's pommel horse
Gold	Yuri Korolev	(Canada) 1985 Montreal	Men's rings
Bronze	Yury Balobanov	(Canada) 1985 Montreal	Men's rings
Gold	Yuri Korolev	(Canada) 1985 Montreal	Men's vault
Bronze	Yelena Shushunova	(Canada) 1985 Montreal	Women's balance beam
Gold	Valentin Mogilny	(Canada) 1985 Montreal	Men's parallel bars
Gold	Oksana Omelianchik	(Canada) 1985 Montreal	Women's floor exercise
Silver	Yelena Shushunova	(Canada) 1985 Montreal	Women's floor exercise
Gold	Dmitry Bilozerchev, Valeri Liukin, Vladimir Artemov, Yuri Korolyov, Vladimir Novikov, Aleksei Tikhonkikh	(Netherlands) 1987 Rotterdam	Men's team
Silver	Yelena Shushunova, Svetlana Baitova, Oksana Omelianchik, Elena Gurova, Svetlana Boginskaya, Tatiana Tuzhikova	(Netherlands) 1987 Rotterdam	Women's team
Gold	Dmitry Bilozerchev	(Netherlands) 1987 Rotterdam	Men's all-around
Silver	Yuri Korolyov	(Netherlands) 1987 Rotterdam	Men's all-around
Bronze	Vladimir Artemov	(Netherlands) 1987 Rotterdam	Men's all-around
Silver	Yelena Shushunova	(Netherlands) 1987 Rotterdam	Women's all-around
Silver	Vladimir Artemov	(Netherlands) 1987 Rotterdam	Men's floor exercise
Gold	Yelena Shushunova	(Netherlands) 1987 Rotterdam	Women's vault
Gold	Dmitry Bilozerchev	(Netherlands) 1987 Rotterdam	Men's pommel horse
Bronze	Yelena Shushunova	(Netherlands) 1987 Rotterdam	Women's uneven bars
Gold	Yuri Korolyov	(Netherlands) 1987 Rotterdam	Men's rings
Silver	Dmitry Bilozerchev	(Netherlands) 1987 Rotterdam	Men's rings
Silver	Yelena Shushunova	(Netherlands) 1987 Rotterdam	Women's balance beam
Bronze	Svetlana Boginskaya	(Netherlands) 1987 Rotterdam	Women's balance beam
Gold	Vladimir Artemov	(Netherlands) 1987 Rotterdam	Men's parallel bars
Silver	Dmitry Bilozerchev	(Netherlands) 1987 Rotterdam	Men's parallel bars
Gold	Yelena Shushunova	(Netherlands) 1987 Rotterdam	Women's floor exercise
Gold	Dmitry Bilozerchev	(Netherlands) 1987 Rotterdam	Men's horizontal bar
Gold	Igor Korobchinsky, Vladimir Artemov, Valentin Mogilny, Vitaly Marinich, Valery Belenky, Vladimir Novikov	(West Germany) 1989 Stuttgart	Men's team
Gold	Natalia Laschenova, Olga Strazheva, Svetlana Boginskaya, Olesya Dudnik, Elena Sazonenkova, Svetlana Baitova	(West Germany) 1989 Stuttgart	Women's team
Gold	Igor Korobchinsky	(West Germany) 1989 Stuttgart	Men's all-around
Silver	Valentin Mogilny	(West Germany) 1989 Stuttgart	Men's all-around
Gold	Svetlana Boginskaya	(West Germany) 1989 Stuttgart	Women's all-around
Silver	Natalia Laschenova	(West Germany) 1989 Stuttgart	Women's all-around
Bronze	Olga Strazheva	(West Germany) 1989 Stuttgart	Women's all-around
Gold	Igor Korobchinsky	(West Germany) 1989 Stuttgart	Men's floor exercise
Silver	Vladimir Artemov	(West Germany) 1989 Stuttgart	Men's floor exercise
Gold	Olesya Dudnik	(West Germany) 1989 Stuttgart	Women's vault
Gold	Valentin Mogilny	(West Germany) 1989 Stuttgart	Men's pommel horse
Bronze	Olga Strazheva	(West Germany) 1989 Stuttgart	Women's uneven bars
Bronze	Vitaly Marinich	(West Germany) 1989 Stuttgart	Men's rings
Bronze	Vladimir Artemov	(West Germany) 1989 Stuttgart	Men's vault
Silver	Olesya Dudnik	(West Germany) 1989 Stuttgart	Women's balance beam
Gold	Vladimir Artemov	(West Germany) 1989 Stuttgart	Men's parallel bars
Gold	Svetlana Boginskaya	(West Germany) 1989 Stuttgart	Women's floor exercise
Silver	Vladimir Artemov	(West Germany) 1989 Stuttgart	Men's horizontal bar
Gold	Vitaly Scherbo, Grigory Misutin, Valeri Liukin, Igor Korobchinsky, Valery Belenky, Alexei Voropaev	(United States) 1991 Indianapolis	Men's team
Gold	Svetlana Boginskaya, Tatiana Gutsu, Tatiana Lysenko, Oksana Chusovitina, Rozalia Galiyeva, Natalia Kalinina	(United States) 1991 Indianapolis	Women's team
Gold	Grigory Misutin	(United States) 1991 Indianapolis	Men's all-around
Silver	Vitaly Scherbo	(United States) 1991 Indianapolis	Men's all-around
Bronze	Valeri Liukin	(United States) 1991 Indianapolis	Men's all-around
Silver	Svetlana Boginskaya	(United States) 1991 Indianapolis	Women's all-around
Gold	Igor Korobchinsky	(United States) 1991 Indianapolis	Men's floor exercise
Silver	Vitaly Scherbo	(United States) 1991 Indianapolis	Men's floor exercise
Silver	Oksana Chusovitina	(United States) 1991 Indianapolis	Women's vault
Gold	Valery Belenky	(United States) 1991 Indianapolis	Men's pommel horse
Silver	Tatiana Gutsu	(United States) 1991 Indianapolis	Women's uneven bars
Gold	Grigory Misutin	(United States) 1991 Indianapolis	Men's rings
Silver	Vitaly Scherbo	(United States) 1991 Indianapolis	Men's vault
Gold	Svetlana Boginskaya	(United States) 1991 Indianapolis	Women's balance beam
Silver	Tatiana Gutsu	(United States) 1991 Indianapolis	Women's balance beam
Silver	Igor Korobchinsky	(United States) 1991 Indianapolis	Men's parallel bars
Gold	Oksana Chusovitina	(United States) 1991 Indianapolis	Women's floor exercise
Bronze	Vitaly Scherbo	(United States) 1991 Indianapolis	Men's horizontal bar
Competing as the Commonwealth of Independent States
Gold	Igor Korobchinsky	(France) 1992 Paris	Men's floor exercise
Silver	Vitaly Scherbo	(France) 1992 Paris	Men's floor exercise
Silver	Svetlana Boginskaya	(France) 1992 Paris	Women's vault
Bronze	Oksana Chusovitina	(France) 1992 Paris	Women's vault
Gold	Vitaly Scherbo	(France) 1992 Paris	Men's pommel horse
Gold	Vitaly Scherbo	(France) 1992 Paris	Men's rings
Bronze	Grigory Misutin	(France) 1992 Paris	Men's rings
Silver	Igor Korobchinsky	(France) 1992 Paris	Men's vault
Gold	Alexei Voropaev	(France) 1992 Paris	Men's parallel bars
Bronze	Valery Belenky	(France) 1992 Paris	Men's parallel bars
Bronze	Tatiana Lysenko	(France) 1992 Paris	Women's floor exercise
Gold	Grigory Misutin	(France) 1992 Paris	Men's horizontal bar
Bronze	Igor Korobchinsky	(France) 1992 Paris	Men's horizontal bar

== Medal tables ==
=== By gender ===
Gender	Gold	Silver	Bronze	Total
Men	66	48	34	148
Women	50	41	30	121

=== By event ===
Event	Gold	Silver	Bronze	Total
Men's individual all-around	13	6	8	27
Men's rings	13	4	8	25
Women's floor exercise	12	8	6	26
Women's individual all-around	12	8	6	26
Women's team	11	3	0	14
Men's parallel bars	9	8	3	20
Men's team	8	6	0	14
Men's pommel horse	8	4	3	15
Women's vault	7	9	6	22
Men's horizontal bar	6	7	5	18
Women's balance beam	5	8	5	18
Men's floor exercise	5	6	3	14
Men's vault	4	7	4	15
Women's uneven bars	3	5	7	15
