= World Artistic Gymnastics Championships – Women's floor =

Women's events at the Artistic Gymnastics World Championships were first held in 1934 at the 10th World Championships. Only the All-Around and Team events were held. In 1938, at the 11th World Championships, the other apparatus events were added.

The women's floor exercise competition has been held in every year since its inception.

Three medals are awarded: gold for first place, silver for second place, and bronze for third place. Tie breakers have not been used in every year. In the event of a tie between two gymnasts, both names are listed, and the following position (second for a tie for first, third for a tie for second) is left empty because a medal was not awarded for that position. If three gymnastics tied for a position, the following two positions are left empty.

== Medalists ==
Bold numbers in brackets denotes record number of victories.

Year	Location	Gold	Silver	Bronze
1938	(Czechoslovakia) Prague *	(Czechoslovakia) Matylda Pálfyová *	unknown	unknown
1950	(Switzerland) Basel	(Poland) Helena Rakoczy	(Socialist Federal Republic of Yugoslavia) Tereza Kočiš	(Poland) Stefania Reindl
1954	(Italy) Rome	(Soviet Union) Tamara Manina	(Czechoslovakia) Eva Bosáková	(Soviet Union) Maria Gorokhovskaya
1958	(Soviet Union) Moscow	(Czechoslovakia) Eva Bosáková	(Soviet Union) Larisa Latynina	(Japan) Keiko Tanaka
1962	(Czechoslovakia) Prague	(Soviet Union) Larisa Latynina	(Soviet Union) Irina Pervushina	(Czechoslovakia) Věra Čáslavská
1966	(West Germany) Dortmund	(Soviet Union) Natalia Kuchinskaya	(Czechoslovakia) Věra Čáslavská	(Soviet Union) Zinaida Druzhinina
1970	(Socialist Federal Republic of Yugoslavia) Ljubljana	(Soviet Union) Ludmilla Tourischeva	(Soviet Union) Olga Karasyova	(Soviet Union) Zinaida Voronina
1974	(Bulgaria) Varna	(Soviet Union) Ludmilla Tourischeva	(Soviet Union) Olga Korbut	(Soviet Union) Elvira Saadi (Soviet Union) Rusudan Sikharulidze
1978	(France) Strasbourg	(Soviet Union) Nellie Kim (Soviet Union) Elena Mukhina	—N/a	(Romania) Emilia Eberle (United States) Kathy Johnson
1979	(United States) Fort Worth	(Romania) Emilia Eberle	(Soviet Union) Nellie Kim	(Romania) Melita Ruhn
1981	(Soviet Union) Moscow	(Soviet Union) Natalia Ilienko	(Soviet Union) Yelena Davydova	(Bulgaria) Zoja Grantcharova
1983	(Hungary) Budapest	(Romania) Ecaterina Szabó	(Soviet Union) Olga Mostepanova	(Bulgaria) Boriana Stoyanova
1985	(Canada) Montreal	(Soviet Union) Oksana Omelianchik	(Soviet Union) Yelena Shushunova	(East Germany) Ulrike Klotz
1987	(Netherlands) Rotterdam	(Soviet Union) Yelena Shushunova (Romania) Daniela Silivaș	—N/a	(Romania) Aurelia Dobre
1989	(West Germany) Stuttgart	(Soviet Union) Svetlana Boginskaya (Romania) Daniela Silivaș	—N/a	(Romania) Cristina Bontaș
1991	(United States) Indianapolis	(Romania) Cristina Bontaș (Soviet Union) Oksana Chusovitina	—N/a	(United States) Kim Zmeskal
1992	(France) Paris	(United States) Kim Zmeskal	(Hungary) Henrietta Ónodi	(Commonwealth of Independent States) Tatiana Lysenko (Romania) Maria Neculiță
1993	(United Kingdom) Birmingham	(United States) Shannon Miller	(Romania) Gina Gogean	(Russia) Natalia Bobrova
1994	(Australia) Brisbane	(Russia) Dina Kochetkova	(Romania) Lavinia Miloșovici	(Romania) Gina Gogean
1995	(Japan) Sabae	(Romania) Gina Gogean	(China) Ji Liya	(France) Ludivine Furnon
1996	(Puerto Rico) San Juan	(Romania) Gina Gogean (China) Kui Yuanyuan	—N/a	(Romania) Lavinia Miloșovici (Ukraine) Liubov Sheremeta
1997	(Switzerland) Lausanne	(Romania) Gina Gogean (3)	(Russia) Svetlana Khorkina	(Russia) Yelena Produnova
1999	(China) Tianjin	(Romania) Andreea Răducan	(Romania) Simona Amânar	(Russia) Svetlana Khorkina
2001	(Belgium) Ghent	(Romania) Andreea Răducan	(Brazil) Daniele Hypólito	(Russia) Svetlana Khorkina
2002	(Hungary) Debrecen	(Spain) Elena Gómez	(Netherlands) Verona van de Leur	(United States) Samantha Sheehan
2003	(United States) Anaheim	(Brazil) Daiane dos Santos	(Romania) Cătălina Ponor	(Spain) Elena Gómez
2005	(Australia) Melbourne	(United States) Alicia Sacramone	(United States) Nastia Liukin	(Netherlands) Suzanne Harmes
2006	(Denmark) Aarhus	(China) Cheng Fei	(United States) Jana Bieger	(Italy) Vanessa Ferrari
2007	(Germany) Stuttgart	(United States) Shawn Johnson	(United States) Alicia Sacramone	(France) Cassy Vericel
2009	(United Kingdom) London	(United Kingdom) Beth Tweddle	(Australia) Lauren Mitchell	(China) Sui Lu
2010	(Netherlands) Rotterdam	(Australia) Lauren Mitchell	(Romania) Diana Chelaru (Russia) Aliya Mustafina	—N/a
2011	(Japan) Tokyo	(Russia) Ksenia Afanasyeva	(China) Sui Lu	(United States) Aly Raisman
2013	(Belgium) Antwerp	(United States) Simone Biles	(Italy) Vanessa Ferrari	(Romania) Larisa Iordache
2014	(China) Nanning	(United States) Simone Biles	(Romania) Larisa Iordache	(Russia) Aliya Mustafina
2015	(United Kingdom) Glasgow	(United States) Simone Biles	(Russia) Ksenia Afanasyeva	(United States) Maggie Nichols
2017	(Canada) Montreal	(Japan) Mai Murakami	(United States) Jade Carey	(United Kingdom) Claudia Fragapane
2018	(Qatar) Doha	(United States) Simone Biles	(United States) Morgan Hurd	(Japan) Mai Murakami
2019	(Germany) Stuttgart	(United States) Simone Biles	(United States) Sunisa Lee	(Russia) Angelina Melnikova
2021	(Japan) Kitakyushu	(Japan) Mai Murakami	Angelina Melnikova	(United States) Leanne Wong
2022	(United Kingdom) Liverpool	(United Kingdom) Jessica Gadirova	(United States) Jordan Chiles	(Brazil) Rebeca Andrade (United States) Jade Carey
2023	(Belgium) Antwerp	(United States) Simone Biles (6)	(Brazil) Rebeca Andrade	(Brazil) Flávia Saraiva
2025	(Indonesia) Jakarta	(Japan) Aiko Sugihara	(United Kingdom) Ruby Evans	(United Kingdom) Abigail Martin
2026	(Netherlands) Rotterdam	(United States) Claire Pease	(United States) Reese Esponda	(France) Maïana Prat

* There is conflicting and incomplete information about medal winners in the individual apparatus events at the 1938 World Artistic Gymnastics Championships as non-primary sources gives different information about it.

== All-time medal count ==
Last updated after the 2026 World Championships.

Rank	Nation	Gold	Silver	Bronze	Total
1	Soviet Union	12	8	5	25
2	United States	11	8	7	26
3	Romania	10	6	8	24
4	Japan	3	0	2	5
5	Russia	2	3	6	11
6	China	2	2	1	5
6	Czechoslovakia	2	2	1	5
8	Great Britain	2	1	2	5
9	Brazil	1	2	2	5
10	Australia	1	1	0	2
11	Poland	1	0	1	2
11	Spain	1	0	1	2
13	Italy	0	1	1	2
13	Netherlands	0	1	1	2
15	Hungary	0	1	0	1
15	Russian Gymnastics Federation ^{[b]}	0	1	0	1
15	Yugoslavia	0	1	0	1
18	France	0	0	3	3
19	Bulgaria	0	0	2	2
20	CIS ^{[a]}	0	0	1	1
20	East Germany	0	0	1	1
20	Ukraine	0	0	1	1
Totals (22 entries)		48	38	46	132

Notes

- ^[a] Official FIG documents credit medals earned by athletes from former Soviet Union at the 1992 World Artistic Gymnastics Championships in Paris, France, as medals for CIS (Commonwealth of Independent States).
- ^[b] At the 2021 World Artistic Gymnastics Championships in Kitakyushu, Japan, in accordance with a ban by the World Anti-Doping Agency (WADA) and a decision by the Court of Arbitration for Sport (CAS), athletes from Russia were not permitted to use the Russian name, flag, or anthem. They instead participated under name and flag of the RGF (Russian Gymnastics Federation).

== Multiple medalists ==
Rank	Gymnast	Nation	Years	Gold	Silver	Bronze	Total
1	Simone Biles	United States	2013–2023	6	0	0	6
2	Gina Gogean	Romania	1993–1997	3	1	1	5
3	Mai Murakami	Japan	2017–2021	2	0	1	3
4	Andreea Răducan	Romania	1999–2001	2	0	0	2
4	Daniela Silivaș	Romania	1987–1989	2	0	0	2
4	Ludmilla Tourischeva	Soviet Union	1970–1974	2	0	0	2
7	Ksenia Afanasyeva	Russia	2011–2015	1	1	0	2
7	Eva Bosáková	Czechoslovakia	1954–1958	1	1	0	2
7	Nellie Kim	Soviet Union	1978–1979	1	1	0	2
7	Larisa Latynina	Soviet Union	1958–1962	1	1	0	2
7	Alicia Sacramone	United States	2005–2007	1	1	0	2
7	Yelena Shushunova	Soviet Union	1985–1987	1	1	0	2
13	Cristina Bontaș	Romania	1989–1991	1	0	1	2
13	Emilia Eberle	Romania	1978–1979	1	0	1	2
13	Elena Gómez	Spain	2002–2003	1	0	1	2
13	Kim Zmeskal	United States	1991–1992	1	0	1	2
17	Svetlana Khorkina	Russia	1997–2001	0	1	2	3
18	Rebeca Andrade	Brazil	2022–2023	0	1	1	2
18	Jade Carey	United States	2017–2022	0	1	1	2
18	Věra Čáslavská	Czechoslovakia	1962–1966	0	1	1	2
18	Vanessa Ferrari	Italy	2006–2013	0	1	1	2
18	Larisa Iordache	Romania	2013–2014	0	1	1	2
18	Angelina Melnikova	Russia; Russian Gymnastics Federation	2019–2021	0	1	1	2
18	Lavinia Miloșovici	Romania	1994–1996	0	1	1	2
18	Aliya Mustafina	Russia	2010–2014	0	1	1	2
18	Sui Lu	China	2009–2011	0	1	1	2
27	Zinaida Voronina (Druzhinina)	Soviet Union	1966–1970	0	0	2	2
