= Gymnastics at the Friendship Games =

Gymnastics at the Friendship Games was contested in two disciplines. Artistic gymnastics was held in Olomouc, Czechoslovakia, between 20 and 26 August 1984, with 14 events (8 men's and 6 women's). Rhythmic gymnastics was held in Sofia, Bulgaria, between 17 and 19 August 1984, with 5 events (all of them women's).

In the women's artistic all-around competition, Olga Mostepanova made history by becoming the first gymnast ever to be awarded a perfect 40.000 total score. With the abolition of the perfect-10 scoring system in 2006 in favor of open-ended scoring, it is very unlikely that any other elite gymnast will match Mostepanova's accomplishment.

== Artistic gymnastics ==
=== Men's events ===
| Event | Gold | | Silver | | Bronze | |
|---|---|---|---|---|---|---|
| Team all-around | Soviet Union (URS); Vladimir Artemov; Yuri Balabanov; Dmitry Bilozerchev; Stepan Martsinkiv; Alexander Pogorelov; Alexander Tumilovich | 590.300 | East Germany (GDR); Holger Behrendt; Roland Brückner; Ulf Hoffmann; Jens Fischer; Sylvio Kroll; Thorsten Mettke | 584.400 | Bulgaria (BUL); Stoichko Gotchev; Borislav Hutov; Marian Penev; Plamen Petkov; Rumen Petkov; Zdravko Stoyanov | 579.400 |
| Individual all-around | Dmitry Bilozerchev (URS) | 119.300 | Vladimir Artemov (URS) | 118.875 | Yuri Balabanov (URS) | 117.525 |
| Floor | Roland Brückner (GDR) | 19.875 | Plamen Petkov (BUL) | 19.775 | Sylvio Kroll (GDR) | 19.750 |
| Pommel horse | Dmitry Bilozerchev (URS) | 19.925 | György Guczoghy (HUN); Vladimir Artemov (URS) | 19.800 | none awarded | – |
| Rings | Dmitry Bilozerchev (URS) | 19.975 | Plamen Petkov (BUL); Vladimir Artemov (URS); György Guczoghy (HUN); Holger Behrendt (GDR) | 19.800 | none awarded | – |
| Vault | Sylvio Kroll (GDR) | 19.950 | Vladimir Artemov (URS) | 19.825 | Marian Penev (BUL); Casimiro Suárez (CUB); Thorsten Mettke (GDR); Dmitry Bilozerchev (URS); Andrzej Zdzieszyński (POL) | 19.800 |
| Parallel bars | Vladimir Artemov (URS) | 19.800 | Ricardo Richards (CUB) | 19.700 | Zdravko Stoyanov (BUL); Li Su-gil (PRK) | 19.450 |
| Horizontal bar | Dmitry Bilozerchev (URS) | 19.975 | Jesús Rivera (CUB) | 19.800 | Felix Aguilera (CUB) | 19.700 |

=== Women's events ===
| Event | Gold | | Silver | | Bronze | |
|---|---|---|---|---|---|---|
| Team all-around | Soviet Union (URS); Irina Baraksanova; Tatiana Frolova; Natalia Ilienko; Olga Mostepanova; Yelena Shushunova; Natalia Yurchenko | 395.250 | East Germany (GDR); Gabriele Fähnrich; Maxi Gnauck; Astrid Heese; Birgit Senff; Bettina Schieferdecker; Franka Voigt | 392.500 | Czechoslovakia (TCH); Iva Červenková; Alena Dřevjaná; Hana Říčná; Martina Koblížková; Jana Labáková; Lenka Pitlovičová | 391.950 |
| Individual all-around | Olga Mostepanova (URS) | 79.825 | Hana Říčná (TCH) | 79.425 | Yelena Shushunova (URS); Maxi Gnauck (GDR) | 79.125 |
| Vault | Olga Mostepanova (URS); Natalia Yurchenko (URS) | 19.900 | none awarded | – | Maxi Gnauck (GDR) | 19.875 |
| Uneven bars | Maxi Gnauck (GDR) | 20.000 | Natalia Yurchenko (URS) | 19.975 | Gabriele Fähnrich (GDR) | 19.950 |
| Balance beam | Olga Mostepanova (URS) | 20.000 | Hana Říčná (TCH) | 19.850 | Alena Dřevjaná (TCH) | 19.750 |
| Floor | Olga Mostepanova (URS); Maxi Gnauck (GDR) | 19.950 | none awarded | – | Bettina Schieferdecker (GDR) | 19.750 |

== Men's artistic ==
=== Team final ===
| Rank | Team | Floor | | Pommel Horse | | Rings | | Vault | | Parallel Bars | | Horizontal Bar | | Total |
| Rank | Team | C | O | C | O | C | O | C | O | C | O | C | O | Total |
|---|---|---|---|---|---|---|---|---|---|---|---|---|---|---|
| Gold medal | Soviet Union | 97.600 | | 98.250 | | 99.150 | | 98.950 | | 98.650 | | 97.700 | | 590.300 |
| Gold medal | Dmitry Bilozerchev | 9.750 | 9.900 | 9.850 | 10.000 | 9.950 | 10.000 | 9.900 | 9.950 | 9.750 | 10.000 | 9.950 | 10.000 | 119.000 |
| Gold medal | Vladimir Artemov | 9.750 | 9.850 | 9.800 | 10.000 | 9.900 | 10.000 | 9.900 | 10.000 | 9.900 | 9.900 | 9.800 | 9.950 | 118.750 |
| Gold medal | Yuri Balabanov | 9.750 | 9.850 | 9.800 | 9.750 | 10.000 | 9.900 | 9.900 | 9.950 | 9.850 | 9.900 | 9.800 | 10.000 | 117.550 |
| Gold medal | Stepan Martsinkiv | 9.600 | 9.650 | 9.800 | 9.950 | 9.750 | 9.850 | 9.800 | 9.800 | 9.750 | 9.900 | 9.000 | 9.800 | 116.650 |
| Gold medal | Alexander Tumilovich | 9.550 | 9.750 | 9.550 | 9.800 | 9.700 | 9.800 | 9.800 | 9.900 | 9.700 | 9.800 | 9.700 | 9.400 | 116.450 |
| Gold medal | Aleksandr Pogorelov | 9.600 | 9.800 | 9.600 | 9.900 | 9.850 | 9.950 | 9.850 | 9.800 | 9.800 | 9.900 | 8.100 | 9.700 | 115.850 |
| Silver medal | East Germany | 97.900 | | 96.650 | | 98.400 | | 98.900 | | 95.800 | | 96.750 | | 584.400 |
| Silver medal | Ulf Hoffmann | 9.550 | 9.550 | 9.650 | 9.800 | 9.700 | 9.900 | 9.850 | 9.900 | 9.600 | 9.700 | 9.800 | 9.900 | 116.900 |
| Silver medal | Holger Behrendt | 9.700 | 9.850 | 9.700 | 9.500 | 9.900 | 10.000 | 9.800 | 9.800 | 9.450 | 9.650 | 9.700 | 9.750 | 116.800 |
| Silver medal | Sylvio Kroll | 9.900 | 9.800 | 9.900 | 9.550 | 9.500 | 9.850 | 10.000 | 10.000 | 9.500 | 9.500 | 9.900 | 9.350 | 116.750 |
| Silver medal | Roland Brückner | 9.950 | 10.000 | 9.600 | 9.800 | 9.600 | 9.750 | 9.750 | 9.900 | 9.400 | 9.550 | 9.550 | 9.600 | 116.450 |
| Silver medal | Jens Fischer | 9.600 | 9.850 | 9.300 | 9.650 | 9.850 | 9.900 | 9.800 | 9.850 | 9.650 | 9.750 | 9.600 | 9.600 | 116.400 |
| Silver medal | Thorsten Mettke | 9.500 | 9.700 | 9.450 | 9.550 | 9.800 | 9.900 | 9.900 | 9.900 | 9.200 | 9.550 | 8.850 | 9.300 | 114.600 |
| Bronze medal | Bulgaria | 97.750 | | 94.600 | | 96.950 | | 98.000 | | 95.650 | | 96.450 | | 579.400 |
| Bronze medal | Borislav Hutov | 9.900 | 9.950 | 9.500 | 9.650 | 9.650 | 9.900 | 9.850 | 9.800 | 9.500 | 9.650 | 9.550 | 9.600 | 116.500 |
| Bronze medal | Plamen Petkov | 9.850 | 9.900 | 9.050 | 9.300 | 9.850 | 9.950 | 9.700 | 9.800 | 9.450 | 9.600 | 9.800 | 9.800 | 116.050 |
| Bronze medal | Marian Penev | 9.550 | 9.700 | 9.400 | 9.650 | 9.550 | 9.800 | 9.900 | 9.900 | 9.450 | 9.650 | 9.700 | 9.350 | 115.600 |
| Bronze medal | Zdravko Stoyanov | 9.800 | 9.300 | 9.500 | 9.650 | 9.750 | 9.500 | 9.800 | 9.700 | 9.350 | 9.500 | 9.600 | 9.650 | 114.700 |
| Bronze medal | Rumen Petkov | 9.650 | 9.800 | 9.100 | 9.450 | 9.500 | 9.500 | 9.800 | 9.700 | 9.350 | 9.500 | 9.600 | 9.650 | 114.600 |
| Bronze medal | Stoichko Gotchev | 9.500 | 9.650 | 9.200 | 9.500 | 9.500 | 9.350 | 9.650 | 9.700 | 9.450 | 9.450 | 9.700 | 9.700 | 114.350 |

=== All-around final ===
| Rank | Gymnast | Floor (gymnastics) | Pommel horse | Rings (gymnastics) | Vault (gymnastics) | Parallel bars | Horizontal bar | Score | Prelim score | Total |
|---|---|---|---|---|---|---|---|---|---|---|
| 1st place, gold medalist(s) | Dmitry Bilozerchev (URS) | 9.900 | 10.000 | 9.900 | 10.000 | 10.000 | 10.000 | 59.800 | 59.500 | 119.300 |
| 2nd place, silver medalist(s) | Vladimir Artemov (URS) | 9.750 | 9.950 | 10.000 | 9.950 | 9.900 | 9.950 | 59.500 | 59.375 | 118.875 |
| 3rd place, bronze medalist(s) | Yuri Balabanov (URS) | 9.900 | 9.800 | 9.900 | 9.900 | 10.000 | 9.250 | 58.750 | 58.775 | 117.525 |
| 4 | Ulf Hoffmann (GDR) | 9.900 | 9.700 | 9.850 | 9.850 | 9.650 | 9.700 | 58.650 | 57.450 | 117.100 |
| 5 | György Guczoghy (HUN) | 9.650 | 9.900 | 9.950 | 9.750 | 9.750 | 9.500 | 58.500 | 58.475 | 116.975 |
| 6 | Daniel Orlet (TCH) | 9.750 | 9.800 | 9.850 | 9.800 | 9.550 | 9.750 | 58.500 | 58.250 | 116.750 |
| 7 | Holger Behrendt (GDR) | 9.900 | 9.200 | 9.900 | 9.800 | 9.700 | 9.800 | 58.300 | 58.400 | 116.700 |
| 8 | Plamen Petkov (BUL) | 9.900 | 9.550 | 9.850 | 9.750 | 9.700 | 9.800 | 58.550 | 58.025 | 116.575 |
| 9 | Li Chol-Hon (PRK) | 9.800 | 9.850 | 9.650 | 9.850 | 9.900 | 9.350 | 58.400 | 58.075 | 116.475 |
| 10 | Zsolt Borkai (HUN) | 9.300 | 9.900 | 9.750 | 9.800 | 9.650 | 9.250 | 57.650 | 58.300 | 115.950 |
| 11 | Casimiro Suárez (CUB) | 9.800 | 9.550 | 9.500 | 9.800 | 9.750 | 9.450 | 57.850 | 58.075 | 115.925 |
| 12 | Dusan Hilbert (TCH) | 9.700 | 9.600 | 9.800 | 9.900 | 9.150 | 9.650 | 57.800 | 58.075 | 115.875 |
| 13 | Borislav Hutov (BUL) | 9.800 | 9.300 | 9.800 | 9.700 | 9.650 | 9.300 | 57.550 | 58.250 | 115.800 |
| 14 | Li Su-gil (PRK) | 9.850 | 9.700 | 9.700 | 9.800 | 9.600 | 9.750 | 58.400 | 57.275 | 115.675 |
| 15 | Jesús Rivera (CUB) | 9.800 | 9.600 | 9.600 | 9.900 | 9.700 | 9.350 | 57.950 | 57.525 | 115.475 |
| 16 | Marian Penev (BUL) | 9.800 | 9.500 | 9.700 | 9.850 | 9.850 | 8.950 | 57.650 | 57.800 | 115.450 |
| 17 | Ricardo Richards (CUB) | 9.500 | 9.850 | 9.300 | 9.700 | 9.850 | 9.450 | 57.650 | 57.750 | 115.400 |
| 18 | Ludek Hofer (TCH) | 9.750 | 9.500 | 9.700 | 9.750 | 9.300 | 9.600 | 57.600 | 57.700 | 115.300 |
| 19 | Sylvio Kroll (GDR) | 9.800 | 9.850 | 9.850 | 9.900 | 9.200 | 8.200 | 56.800 | 58.375 | 115.175 |
| 20 | Kim Chol-Nam (PRK) | 9.700 | 9.600 | 9.200 | 9.700 | 8.600 | 9.850 | 56.650 | 57.050 | 113.700 |
| 21 | Ferenc Donáth (HUN) | 9.250 | 8.600 | 9.700 | 9.700 | 8.950 | 9.250 | 55.450 | 57.725 | 113.175 |
| 22 | Sobala (POL) | 9.400 | 9.450 | 9.500 | 9.750 | 9.550 | 9.500 | 57.150 | 55.975 | 113.125 |
| 23 | Dysko (POL) | 9.550 | 9.200 | 9.500 | 9.700 | 9.300 | 9.450 | 56.700 | 55.925 | 112.625 |
| 24 | Carl Beynon (GBR) | 9.600 | 9.350 | 9.400 | 9.600 | 9.200 | 8.900 | 56.060 | 55.900 | 111.950 |
| 25 | Pelc (POL) | 9.700 | 7.950 | 9.500 | 9.700 | 8.950 | 9.500 | 55.300 | 56.125 | 111.425 |
| 26 | Tony Griffiths (GBR) | 9.250 | 9.250 | 9.000 | 9.550 | 9.200 | 9.150 | 55.400 | 55.275 | 110.625 |
| 27 | Kevin Childs (GBR) | 0.000 | 0.000 | 0.000 | 0.000 | 0.000 | 8.700 | 8.700 | 55.350 | 64.050 |

=== Floor exercise ===
| Rank | Gymnast | Score | Prelim score | Total |
|---|---|---|---|---|
| 1st place, gold medalist(s) | Roland Brückner (GDR) | 9.900 | 9.975 | 19.875 |
| 2nd place, silver medalist(s) | Plamen Petkov (BUL) | 9.900 | 9.875 | 19.775 |
| 3rd place, bronze medalist(s) | Sylvio Kroll (GDR) | 9.900 | 9.850 | 19.750 |
| 4 | Vladimir Artemov (URS) | 9.900 | 9.800 | 19.700 |
| 5 | Dusan Hilbert (TCH) | 9.900 | 9.775 | 19.675 |
| 6 | Yuri Balabanov (URS) | 9.850 | 9.800 | 19.650 |
| 7 | Borislav Hutov (BUL) | 9.700 | 9.925 | 19.625 |
| 8 | Ludek Hofer (TCH) | 9.700 | 9.875 | 19.575 |

=== Pommel horse ===
| Rank | Gymnast | Score | Prelim score | Total |
|---|---|---|---|---|
| 1st place, gold medalist(s) | Dmitry Bilozerchev (URS) | 10.000 | 9.925 | 19.925 |
| 2nd place, silver medalist(s) | György Guczoghy (HUN) | 9.900 | 9.900 | 19.800 |
| 2nd place, silver medalist(s) | Vladimir Artemov (URS) | 9.900 | 9.900 | 19.800 |
| 4 | Zsolt Borkai (HUN) | 9.900 | 9.825 | 19.725 |
| 5 | Li Chol-Hon (PRK) | 9.900 | 9.800 | 19.700 |
| 6 | Ricardo Richards (CUB) | 9.800 | 9.825 | 19.625 |
| 7 | Daniel Orlet (TCH) | 9.750 | 9.825 | 19.575 |
| 8 | Ulf Hoffmann (GDR) | 9.800 | 9.725 | 19.525 |

=== Rings ===
| Rank | Gymnast | Score | Prelim score | Total |
|---|---|---|---|---|
| 1st place, gold medalist(s) | Dmitry Bilozerchev (URS) | 10.000 | 9.975 | 19.975 |
| 2nd place, silver medalist(s) | Plamen Petkov (BUL) | 9.900 | 9.900 | 19.800 |
| 2nd place, silver medalist(s) | Vladimir Artemov (URS) | 9.850 | 9.950 | 19.800 |
| 2nd place, silver medalist(s) | György Guczoghy (HUN) | 9.900 | 9.900 | 19.800 |
| 2nd place, silver medalist(s) | Holger Behrendt (GDR) | 9.850 | 9.950 | 19.800 |
| 6 | Jens Fischer (GDR) | 9.850 | 9.875 | 19.725 |
| 7 | Ferenc Donáth (HUN) | 9.750 | 9.825 | 19.575 |
| 8 | Daniel Orlet (TCH) | 9.600 | 9.800 | 19.400 |

=== Vault ===
| Rank | Gymnast | Score | Prelim score | Total |
|---|---|---|---|---|
| 1st place, gold medalist(s) | Sylvio Kroll (GDR) | 9.950 | 10.000 | 19.950 |
| 2nd place, silver medalist(s) | Vladimir Artemov (URS) | 9.850 | 9.950 | 19.825 |
| 3rd place, bronze medalist(s) | Marian Penev (BUL) | 9.900 | 9.900 | 19.800 |
| 3rd place, bronze medalist(s) | Casimiro Suárez (CUB) | 9.925 | 9.875 | 19.800 |
| 3rd place, bronze medalist(s) | Thorsten Mettke (GDR) | 9.900 | 9.900 | 19.800 |
| 3rd place, bronze medalist(s) | Dmitry Bilozerchev (URS) | 9.875 | 9.925 | 19.800 |
| 3rd place, bronze medalist(s) | Andrzej Zdzieszyński (POL) | 9.900 | 9.900 | 19.800 |
| 8 | Koloman Hianik (TCH) | 9.850 | 9.900 | 19.750 |

=== Parallel bars ===
| Rank | Gymnast | Score | Prelim score | Total |
|---|---|---|---|---|
| 1st place, gold medalist(s) | Vladimir Artemov (URS) | 9.900 | 9.900 | 19.800 |
| 2nd place, silver medalist(s) | Ricardo Richards (CUB) | 9.900 | 9.800 | 19.700 |
| 3rd place, bronze medalist(s) | Zdravko Stoyanov (BUL) | 9.750 | 9.700 | 19.450 |
| 3rd place, bronze medalist(s) | Li Su-gil (PRK) | 9.800 | 9.650 | 19.450 |
| 5 | Ulf Hoffmann (GDR) | 9.750 | 9.650 | 19.400 |
| 6 | György Guczoghy (HUN) | 9.700 | 9.675 | 19.375 |
| 7 | Dmitry Bilozerchev (URS) | 9.450 | 9.875 | 19.325 |
| 8 | Jens Fischer (GDR) | 9.500 | 9.700 | 19.200 |

=== Horizontal bar ===
| Rank | Gymnast | Score | Prelim score | Total |
|---|---|---|---|---|
| 1st place, gold medalist(s) | Dmitry Bilozerchev (URS) | 10.000 | 9.975 | 19.975 |
| 2nd place, silver medalist(s) | Jesús Rivera (CUB) | 9.900 | 9.900 | 19.800 |
| 3rd place, bronze medalist(s) | Zsolt Borkai (HUN) | 9.900 | 9.800 | 19.700 |
| 3rd place, bronze medalist(s) | Felix Aguilera (CUB) | 9.850 | 9.850 | 19.700 |
| 5 | Dusan Hilbert (TCH) | 9.850 | 9.825 | 19.675 |
| 6 | Plamen Petkov (BUL) | 9.800 | 9.800 | 19.600 |
| 7 | Yuri Balabanov (URS) | 9.450 | 9.900 | 19.350 |
| 8 | Ulf Hoffmann (GDR) | 9.350 | 9.850 | 19.200 |

== Women's artistic ==
=== Team final ===
| Rank | Team | Vault | | Uneven Bars | | Balance Beam | | Floor | | Total |
| Rank | Team | C | O | C | O | C | O | C | O | Total |
|---|---|---|---|---|---|---|---|---|---|---|
| 1st place, gold medalist(s) | Soviet Union | 99.400 | | 99.100 | | 98.300 | | 98.450 | | 395.250 |
| 1st place, gold medalist(s) | Olga Mostepanova | 10.000 | 10.000 | 10.000 | 9.750 | 10.000 | 10.000 | 9.900 | 10.000 | 79.650 |
| 1st place, gold medalist(s) | Natalia Yurchenko | 9.900 | 10.000 | 10.000 | 9.950 | 9.950 | 9.450 | 9.850 | 9.800 | 78.850 |
| 1st place, gold medalist(s) | Yelena Shushunova | 9.900 | 10.000 | 9.800 | 9.900 | 9.700 | 9.850 | 9.750 | 9.950 | 78.850 |
| 1st place, gold medalist(s) | Natalia Ilienko | 9.850 | 9.950 | 9.900 | 9.900 | 9.850 | 9.800 | 9.750 | 9.700 | 78.700 |
| 1st place, gold medalist(s) | Tatiana Frolova | 9.900 | 9.900 | 9.900 | 9.900 | 9.900 | 9.250 | 9.700 | 9.900 | 78.350 |
| 1st place, gold medalist(s) | Irina Baraksanova | 9.700 | 9.900 | 9.750 | 9.850 | 9.800 | 9.700 | 9.550 | 9.850 | 78.100 |
| 2nd place, silver medalist(s) | East Germany | 99.000 | | 98.850 | | 96.550 | | 98.100 | | 392.100 |
| 2nd place, silver medalist(s) | Maxi Gnauck | 9.950 | 10.000 | 10.000 | 10.000 | 9.750 | 9.850 | 9.950 | 9.950 | 79.450 |
| 2nd place, silver medalist(s) | Bettina Schieferdecker | 9.950 | 9.950 | 9.800 | 9.900 | 9.600 | 9.550 | 9.850 | 9.850 | 78.450 |
| 2nd place, silver medalist(s) | Franka Voigt | 9.800 | 9.900 | 9.800 | 9.750 | 9.700 | 9.750 | 9.700 | 9.800 | 78.200 |
| 2nd place, silver medalist(s) | Astrid Heese | 9.650 | 9.950 | 9.700 | 9.300 | 9.650 | 9.850 | 9.750 | 9.750 | 77.600 |
| 2nd place, silver medalist(s) | Gabriele Fähnrich | 9.750 | 9.700 | 10.000 | 9.900 | 9.550 | 9.300 | 9.600 | 9.750 | 77.550 |
| 2nd place, silver medalist(s) | Birgit Senff | 9.850 | 9.900 | 9.900 | 9.800 | 9.250 | 9.250 | 9.750 | 9.400 | 77.050 |
| 3rd place, bronze medalist(s) | Czechoslovakia | 98.750 | | 98.550 | | 97.550 | | 97.100 | | 391.950 |
| 3rd place, bronze medalist(s) | Hana Říčná | 9.950 | 9.950 | 9.900 | 9.900 | 9.900 | 10.000 | 9.800 | 9.950 | 79.350 |
| 3rd place, bronze medalist(s) | Alena Dřevjaná | 9.750 | 9.800 | 9.950 | 9.950 | 9.900 | 9.900 | 9.650 | 9.900 | 78.800 |
| 3rd place, bronze medalist(s) | Martina Koblížková | 9.900 | 10.000 | 9.900 | 9.850 | 9.500 | 9.750 | 9.600 | 9.750 | 78.250 |
| 3rd place, bronze medalist(s) | Jana Labáková | 9.800 | 9.900 | 9.750 | 9.850 | 9.350 | 9.800 | 9.400 | 9.850 | 77.700 |
| 3rd place, bronze medalist(s) | Iva Červenková | 9.800 | 9.850 | 9.650 | 9.600 | 9.800 | 9.350 | 9.550 | 9.650 | 77.250 |
| 3rd place, bronze medalist(s) | Lenka Pitlovičová | 9.750 | 9.850 | 9.700 | 9.800 | 8.850 | 9.650 | 9.400 | 9.650 | 76.650 |

=== All-around final ===
| Rank | Gymnast | Vault (gymnastics) | Uneven bars | Balance beam | Floor (gymnastics) | Score | Prelim score | Total |
|---|---|---|---|---|---|---|---|---|
| 1st place, gold medalist(s) | Olga Mostepanova (URS) | 10.000 | 10.000 | 10.000 | 10.000 | 40.000 | 39.825 | 79.825 |
| 2nd place, silver medalist(s) | Hana Říčná (TCH) | 10.000 | 10.000 | 9.850 | 9.900 | 39.750 | 39.675 | 79.425 |
| 3rd place, bronze medalist(s) | Yelena Shushunova (URS) | 9.950 | 9.950 | 9.900 | 9.900 | 39.700 | 39.425 | 79.125 |
| 3rd place, bronze medalist(s) | Maxi Gnauck (GDR) | 9.950 | 9.500 | 9.950 | 10.000 | 39.400 | 39.725 | 79.125 |
| 5 | Alena Dřevjaná (TCH) | 9.900 | 9.950 | 10.000 | 9.850 | 39.700 | 39.400 | 79.100 |
| 5 | Natalia Yurchenko (URS) | 10.000 | 9.900 | 10.000 | 9.750 | 39.650 | 39.450 | 79.100 |
| 7 | Franka Voigt (GDR) | 10.000 | 9.900 | 9.750 | 9.900 | 39.550 | 39.100 | 78.650 |
| 7 | Boriana Stoyanova (BUL) | 9.950 | 10.000 | 9.750 | 9.800 | 39.500 | 39.150 | 78.650 |
| 9 | Miroslava Koblizkova (TCH) | 9.900 | 10.000 | 9.800 | 9.800 | 39.500 | 39.125 | 78.625 |
| 10 | Bettina Schieferdecker (GDR) | 9.950 | 9.900 | 9.600 | 9.400 | 38.850 | 39.225 | 78.075 |
| 11 | Zoi Men-Chi (PRK) | 9.800 | 9.850 | 9.750 | 9.700 | 39.100 | 38.375 | 77.475 |
| 12 | Zoya Grancharova (BUL) | 9.900 | 9.900 | 9.250 | 9.400 | 38.450 | 38.950 | 77.400 |
| 13 | Suarez (CUB) | 9.900 | 9.700 | 9.650 | 9.700 | 38.950 | 38.275 | 77.225 |
| 14 | Kan Men-Suk (PRK) | 9.850 | 9.750 | 9.700 | 9.750 | 39.050 | 38.050 | 77.100 |
| 15 | Bojanka Demireva (BUL) | 9.900 | 9.750 | 9.600 | 9.000 | 38.250 | 38.750 | 77.000 |
| 16 | Beáta Storczer (HUN) | 9.800 | 9.750 | 9.600 | 9.900 | 39.050 | 37.900 | 76.950 |
| 16 | Erika Csányi (HUN) | 9.850 | 9.800 | 9.550 | 9.500 | 38.700 | 38.250 | 76.950 |
| 18 | Benavides (CUB) | 9.850 | 9.400 | 9.450 | 9.750 | 38.450 | 38.175 | 76.625 |
| 19 | Tunde Zsilinszki (HUN) | 9.900 | 9.750 | 9.100 | 9.750 | 38.500 | 38.100 | 76.600 |
| 20 | Li Sun-Ok (PRK) | 9.400 | 9.550 | 9.300 | 9.700 | 37.950 | 37.975 | 75.325 |
| 21 | Palomo (CUB) | 9.900 | 9.750 | 9.100 | 9.750 | 38.500 | 37.775 | 75.325 |
| 22 | Laura Thomas (GBR) | 9.850 | 8.950 | 9.300 | 9.450 | 37.550 | 36.650 | 74.200 |
| 23 | Chu Luu (MGL) | 9.150 | 8.900 | 8.750 | 8.900 | 35.700 | 36.150 | 71.850 |
| 24 | Yvette Austin (GBR) | 9.700 | 8.900 | 8.750 | 0.000 | 27.350 | 36.825 | 64.175 |

=== Vault ===
| Rank | Gymnast | Score | Prelim score | Total |
|---|---|---|---|---|
| 1st place, gold medalist(s) | Natalia Yurchenko (URS) | 9.950 | 9.950 | 19.900 |
| 1st place, gold medalist(s) | Olga Mostepanova (URS) | 9.900 | 10.000 | 19.900 |
| 3rd place, bronze medalist(s) | Maxi Gnauck (GDR) | 9.900 | 9.975 | 19.875 |
| 4 | Bettina Schieferdecker (GDR) | 9.825 | 9.950 | 19.775 |
| 5 | Miroslava Koblizkova (TCH) | 9.850 | 9.900 | 19.750 |
| 5 | Zoya Grancharova (BUL) | 9.850 | 9.900 | 19.750 |
| 7 | Suarez (CUB) | 9.800 | 9.850 | 19.650 |
| 8 | Boriana Stoyanova (BUL) | 9.800 | 9.900 | 19.600 |

=== Uneven bars ===
| Rank | Gymnast | Score | Prelim score | Total |
|---|---|---|---|---|
| 1st place, gold medalist(s) | Maxi Gnauck (GDR) | 10.000 | 10.000 | 20.000 |
| 2nd place, silver medalist(s) | Natalia Yurchenko (URS) | 10.000 | 9.975 | 19.975 |
| 3rd place, bronze medalist(s) | Gabriele Fähnrich (GDR) | 10.000 | 9.950 | 19.950 |
| 4 | Alena Dřevjaná (TCH) | 9.950 | 9.950 | 19.900 |
| 5 | Natalia Ilienko (URS) | 9.900 | 9.900 | 19.800 |
| 6 | Silviya Topalova (BUL) | 9.900 | 9.800 | 19.700 |
| 7 | Boriana Stoyanova (BUL) | 9.850 | 9.825 | 19.675 |
| 8 | Hana Říčná (TCH) | 9.500 | 9.900 | 19.400 |

=== Balance beam ===
| Rank | Gymnast | Score | Prelim score | Total |
|---|---|---|---|---|
| 1st place, gold medalist(s) | Olga Mostepanova (URS) | 10.000 | 10.000 | 20.000 |
| 2nd place, silver medalist(s) | Hana Říčná (TCH) | 9.900 | 9.950 | 19.850 |
| 3rd place, bronze medalist(s) | Alena Dřevjaná (TCH) | 9.850 | 9.900 | 19.750 |
| 4 | Natalia Ilienko (URS) | 9.850 | 9.825 | 19.675 |
| 5 | Maxi Gnauck (GDR) | 9.825 | 9.900 | 19.650 |
| 6 | Astrid Heese (GDR) | 9.800 | 9.750 | 19.550 |
| 7 | Bojanka Demireva (BUL) | 9.750 | 9.650 | 19.400 |
| 8 | Li Sun-Ok (PRK) | 9.300 | 9.775 | 19.075 |

=== Floor exercise ===
| Rank | Gymnast | Score | Prelim score | Total |
|---|---|---|---|---|
| 1st place, gold medalist(s) | Olga Mostepanova (URS) | 10.000 | 9.950 | 19.950 |
| 1st place, gold medalist(s) | Maxi Gnauck (GDR) | 10.000 | 9.950 | 19.950 |
| 3rd place, bronze medalist(s) | Bettina Schieferdecker (GDR) | 9.900 | 9.850 | 19.750 |
| 4 | Boriana Stoyanova (BUL) | 9.900 | 9.825 | 19.725 |
| 4 | Hana Říčná (TCH) | 9.850 | 9.875 | 19.725 |
| 6 | Zoya Grancharova (BUL) | 9.750 | 9.875 | 19.625 |
| 7 | Alena Dřevjaná (TCH) | 9.800 | 9.775 | 19.575 |
| 8 | Yelena Shushunova (URS) | 9.500 | 9.850 | 19.350 |

== Rhythmic gymnastics ==
| Event | Gold | | Silver | | Bronze | |
|---|---|---|---|---|---|---|
| Individual all-around | Diliana Georgieva (BUL) | 39.60 | Anelia Ralenkova (BUL); Dalia Kutkaitė (URS) | 39.45 | none awarded | – |
| Individual ribbon | Anelia Ralenkova (BUL) | 20.00 | Dalia Kutkaitė (URS) | 19.85 | Galina Beloglazova (URS); Diliana Georgieva (BUL) | 19.70 |
| Individual clubs | Diliana Georgieva (BUL) | 20.00 | Galina Beloglazova (URS) | 19.70 | Dalia Kutkaitė (URS) | 19.60 |
| Individual hoop | Diliana Georgieva (BUL) | 19.95 | Anelia Ralenkova (BUL) | 19.90 | Galina Beloglazova (URS) | 19.80 |
| Individual ball | Anelia Ralenkova (BUL); Diliana Georgieva (BUL) | 19.95 | none awarded | – | Galina Beloglazova (URS); Dalia Kutkaitė (URS) | 19.80 |

== Medal table ==
* Host nation (Bulgaria)

| Rank | Nation | Gold | Silver | Bronze | Total |
|---|---|---|---|---|---|
| 1 | Soviet Union (URS) | 12 | 8 | 8 | 28 |
| 2 | Bulgaria (BUL)* | 6 | 4 | 4 | 14 |
| 3 | East Germany (GDR) | 4 | 3 | 6 | 13 |
| 4 | Cuba (CUB) | 0 | 2 | 2 | 4 |
| 4 | Czechoslovakia (TCH)* | 0 | 2 | 2 | 4 |
| 6 | Hungary (HUN) | 0 | 2 | 0 | 2 |
| 7 | North Korea (PRK) | 0 | 0 | 1 | 1 |
| 7 | Poland (POL) | 0 | 0 | 1 | 1 |
| Totals (8 entries) | | 22 | 21 | 24 | 67 |

== See also ==
- Gymnastics at the 1984 Summer Olympics
