= Tatiana Frolova =

Russian artistic gymnast

- Татьяна Фролова
- Full name: Tatiana Yurievna Frolova
- Born: 26 April 1966 (age 60) Bryansk, Russian SFSR, Soviet Union

Gymnastics career
- Discipline: Women's artistic gymnastics
- Country represented: Soviet Union; (1980–1985)
- Head coach: Vladimir Siskin
- Eponymous skills: Floor exercise: Switch leap with 1/2 turn (180°) in flight phase
Medal record
Representing Soviet Union
World Championships
Gold medal – first place	1983 Budapest	Team
World University Games
Gold medal – first place	1985 Kobe	Team
Bronze medal – third place	1985 Kobe	All-around
Friendship Games
Gold medal – first place	1984 Olomouc	Team

Tatiana Yurievna Frolova (Russian: Татьяна Юрьевна Фролова; born 26 April 1966) is a Russian former artistic gymnast. She won gold medals with the Soviet Union national team at the 1983 World Championships and the 1984 Friendship Games. She also won a team gold medal at the 1985 World University Games, where she also won an all-around bronze medal.

== Gymnastics career ==
=== 1981–1982 ===
Frolova won a bronze medal in the all-around at the 1981 Ennia Gold Cup behind Emilia Eberle and Eva Marečková. She then won another all-around bronze medal at the Moscow News behind teammates Alla Misnik and Natalia Ilienko. She placed 13th in the all-around at the USSR Championships but won a silver medal on the uneven bars. She then won the silver medal in the all-around at the USSR Cup, behind Misnik, and she won the vault title. She was an alternate for the 1981 World Championships team.

Frolova finished sixth in the all-around at the 1982 American Cup. She was scheduled to compete at the 1982 Daily Mirror International in Wembley Arena and was favored to win, but she withdrew from the competition after a knee injury in training. She did not compete for the rest of the year.

=== 1983 ===
Frolova won the all-around title at the 1983 Riga International and also won a gold medal on the floor exercise, a silver medal on the uneven bars, and bronze medals on the vault and balance beam. She then helped the Soviet Union win a 1983 dual meet against the United States, and she won the floor exercise title. She finished 15th in the all-around at the 1983 USSR Championships but won bronze medals on the vault and floor exercise. She then placed sixth in the all-around at the USSR Cup and won the gold medal on the floor exercise. She won a gold medal 1983 World Championships with the Soviet team of Olga Bicherova, Olga Mostepanova, Natalia Ilienko, Albina Shishova, and Natalia Yurchenko. Individually, she placed fifth in the all-around final. She also finished fourth on the uneven bars and fifth on the balance beam.

=== 1984–1985 ===
Frolova tied with Zhou Ping for the silver medal in the all-around at the 1984 Beijing International. She then won the all-around title at the Riga International for the second year in a row. She also won the uneven bars title and tied with Daniela Silivaș for the floor exercise title. She won the silver medal in the all-around at the USSR Cup behind Olga Mostepanova. Frolova competed at the 1984 Friendship Games, which were held in place of the 1984 Summer Olympics due to the Soviet-led boycott. The team of Frolova, Irina Baraksanova, Ilienko, Mostepanova, Yelena Shushunova, and Yurchenko won the gold medal.

Frolova competed with the Soviet team that won the gold medal at the 1985 World University Games, and she won a bronze medal in the all-around behind teammate Natalia Yurchenko and Romanian Ecaterina Szabo. She placed seventh on the uneven bars and sixth on the balance beam. This was the final year of her competitive career.

== Eponymous skill ==
Apparatus	Name	Description	Difficulty (Note: Valid for the 2025–2028 Code of Points)
Floor exercise	Frolova	Switch leap with 1/2 turn (180°) in flight phase	C (0.3)

== Competitive history ==
Competitive history of Tatiana Frolova
Year	Event	Team	AA	VT	UB	BB	FX
1980	USSR Championships		11				
1980	USSR-GDR Dual Meet	1st place, gold medalist(s)	3rd place, bronze medalist(s)				
1981	Ennia Gold Cup		3rd place, bronze medalist(s)	2nd place, silver medalist(s)		5	2nd place, silver medalist(s)
1981	Moscow News		3rd place, bronze medalist(s)	1st place, gold medalist(s)			
1981	Schoolchildren's Spartakiade	4					2nd place, silver medalist(s)
1981	USSR Championships		13		2nd place, silver medalist(s)	7	
1981	USSR Cup		2nd place, silver medalist(s)	1st place, gold medalist(s)			
1982	American Cup		6				
1983	Riga International		1st place, gold medalist(s)	3rd place, bronze medalist(s)	2nd place, silver medalist(s)	3rd place, bronze medalist(s)	1st place, gold medalist(s)
1983	USA-USSR Dual Meet	1st place, gold medalist(s)	8				1st place, gold medalist(s)
1983	USSR Championships		13	3rd place, bronze medalist(s)			3rd place, bronze medalist(s)
1983	USSR Cup		6	5		4	1st place, gold medalist(s)
1983	World Championships	1st place, gold medalist(s)	5		4	5	
1984	Beijing International		2nd place, silver medalist(s)		1st place, gold medalist(s)		
1984	Riga International		1st place, gold medalist(s)		1st place, gold medalist(s)	3rd place, bronze medalist(s)	1st place, gold medalist(s)
1984	USSR Cup		2nd place, silver medalist(s)				
1984	Friendship Games	1st place, gold medalist(s)					
1985	World University Games	1st place, gold medalist(s)	3rd place, bronze medalist(s)		7	6	
