= Hana Říčná =

Czech gymnast (born 1968)

- Born: 20 December 1968 (age 57) Brno, Czechoslovakia
- Height: 1.57 m (5 ft 2 in)

Gymnastics career
- Discipline: Women's artistic gymnastics
- Country represented: Czechoslovakia
- Gym: Zbrojovka Brno
- Head coaches: Radek and Drahomíra Kříž
- Eponymous skills: Ricna (uneven bars)
Medal record
Women's artistic gymnastics
Representing Czechoslovakia
World Championships
Silver medal – second place	1983 Budapest	Balance beam
Bronze medal – third place	1985 Montreal	Uneven bars
European Championships
Silver medal – second place	1985 Helsinki	Balance beam
Friendship Games
Silver medal – second place	1984 Olomouc	All-around
Silver medal – second place	1984 Olomouc	Balance beam
Bronze medal – third place	1984 Olomouc	Team

Hana Říčná (born 20 December 1968) is a Czech former artistic gymnast. Competing for Czechoslovakia, she won two medals at the World Championships – a silver on the balance beam in 1983 and a bronze on the uneven bars in 1985. She competed at the 1984 Friendship Games and won a silver medal in the all-around and on the balance beam. She also won a silver medal on beam at the 1985 European Championships. She represented Czechoslovakia at the 1988 Summer Olympics.

== Gymnastics career ==
Říčná began competing at the senior level in 1983 and finished 13th in the all-around at the 1983 European Championships. She qualified for the uneven bars and floor exercise final, finishing eighth and sixth, respectively. Then at the 1983 World Championships, she helped the Czechoslovak team finish sixth. She advanced to the all-around final and finished 14th. She also advanced to the uneven bars final and finished eighth. Then in the balance beam final, she won the silver medal behind Olga Mostepanova.

Říčná finished seventh in the all-around at the 1984 American Cup and tied with Mary Lou Retton for the balance beam title. Due to Czechoslovakia joining the Soviet-led boycott of the 1984 Summer Olympics, she competed at the 1984 Friendship Games. There, she won the all-around silver medal behind Mostepanova despite scoring perfect 10s on the vault and uneven bars. She helped her country win the bronze medal in the team event. She also finished second to Mostepanova in the balance beam final. She tied for fourth place in the balance beam final and finished eighth in the uneven bars final.

Říčná finished fourth in the all-around, uneven bars, and floor exercise finals at the 1985 European Championships. She did win the silver medal on the balance beam behind Oksana Omelianchik. Then at the 1985 World Championships, she won a bronze medal on the uneven bars behind Gabriele Fähnrich and Dagmar Kersten. She also finished eighth in the all-around and fifth on the balance beam.

Říčná represented Czechoslovakia at the 1988 Summer Olympics and helped the team finish seventh. She qualified for the individual all-around final and finished 29th.

== Post-gymnastics ==
Říčná moved to the United States in 1994 and began coaching gymnastics. She married Lorin Jessen, who is also a gymnastics coach. Her son, David Jessen, is an elite gymnast who represented the Czech Republic at the 2016 Summer Olympics. Her daughter Sandra also competed in gymnastics for Stanford. In 2025, she opened the Ricna Elite Gymnastics Academy in Hazleton, Pennsylvania.

== Eponymous skill ==
Říčná has an uneven bars release move named after her in the Code of Points.

Apparatus	Name	Description	Difficulty (Note: Valid for the 2025–2028 Code of Points)
Uneven bars	Ricna	Stalder to counter reversed straddled hecht over high bar	E (0.5)
