= Zoya Grancharova =

Bulgarian artistic gymnast

- Зоя Грънчарова
- Born: 6 May 1966 (age 58); Sofia, Bulgaria

Gymnastics career
- Discipline: Women's artistic gymnastics
- Country represented: Bulgaria

Zoya Grancharova (Bulgarian: Зоя Грънчарова; born 6 May 1966) is a Bulgarian former artistic gymnast. She won the bronze medal on floor exercise at the 1981 World Championships, making her the first Bulgarian woman to medal at the World Championships.

== Personal life ==
Grancharova married Nikolai Kolev, a wrestling coach, with whom she has a son, Victor, and a daughter, Georgia.

== Career ==
Grancharova was known for her choreography on the floor exercise, which used unusual movements; she said that she intentionally tried to create routines that were different from what other gymnasts were performing.

She competed at the 1981 World Championships, where she finished 17th in the all-around and qualified to the floor final, where she won the bronze medal. This was the first time a woman representing Bulgaria won a medal at the World Championships.

In 1982, she competed at the American Cup, and she tied Julianne McNamara for first place. It was the only time that the title was tied.

Grancharova competed at the 1983 European Championships. There she was 6th in the all-around and qualified to three apparatus finals, with her best placement being 4th on the floor exercise. She also competed at her second World Championships, where she placed 8th in the all-around and 5th in the floor final.

Due to the Soviet boycott of the 1984 Olympics, she competed at the Friendship Games instead that year and placed 12th in the all-around. Later in the year, she had a severe injury where she broke her arm in several places and had nerve damage that prevented her from moving her fingers. She took a year off to recover but decided to end her competitive career.

After her retirement, she moved to Toronto in 1991 with her husband to coach.

== Competitive history ==
Year	Event	Team	AA	VT	UB	BB	FX
1980	Balkan Championships	2nd place, silver medalist(s)	2nd place, silver medalist(s)				
1980	Junior Friendship Tournament	4			7		
1981	Balkan Championships	2nd place, silver medalist(s)	5	2nd place, silver medalist(s)		2nd place, silver medalist(s)	5
1981	Blume Memorial		6		2nd place, silver medalist(s)		
1981	Moscow News		10				
1981	World Championships	4	17				3rd place, bronze medalist(s)
1982	McDonald's American Cup		1st place, gold medalist(s)				
1982	Golden Sands		2nd place, silver medalist(s)			1st place, gold medalist(s)	1st place, gold medalist(s)
1982	Rome Grand Prix		8				
1982	Tokyo Cup					2nd place, silver medalist(s)	3rd place, bronze medalist(s)
1982	World Cup Final		10	6	8	8	
1983	Balkan Championships			2nd place, silver medalist(s)			
1983	European Championships		6	7	6		4
1983	World Championships	4	8				5
1984	Chunichi Cup		10				
1984	Friendship Games		12	5			6
1984	Golden Sands		3rd place, bronze medalist(s)			1st place, gold medalist(s)	
