= Maxi Gnauck =

East German artistic gymnast

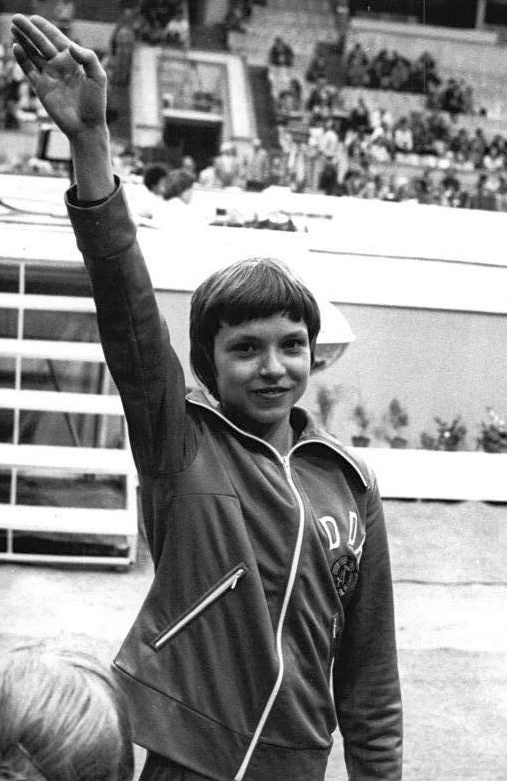
- Gnauck in 1983

Personal information
- Born: 10 October 1964 (age 61) East Berlin, East Germany
- Height: 1.48 m (4 ft 10 in)

Gymnastics career
- Discipline: Women's artistic gymnastics
- Country represented: East Germany (1977–1985)
- Club: SC Dynamo Berlin
- Retired: April 1986
Medal record
Olympic Games
Gold medal – first place	1980 Moscow	Uneven bars
Silver medal – second place	1980 Moscow	All-around
Bronze medal – third place	1980 Moscow	Team
Bronze medal – third place	1980 Moscow	Floor exercise
World Championships
Gold medal – first place	1979 Ft. Worth	Uneven Bars
Gold medal – first place	1981 Moscow	Balance Beam
Gold medal – first place	1981 Moscow	Uneven Bars
Gold medal – first place	1981 Moscow	Vault
Gold medal – first place	1983 Budapest	Uneven Bars
Silver medal – second place	1979 Ft. Worth	All-Around
Bronze medal – third place	1979 Ft. Worth	Team
Bronze medal – third place	1981 Moscow	Team
Bronze medal – third place	1983 Budapest	Team
European Championships
Gold medal – first place	1981 Madrid	All-Around
Gold medal – first place	1981 Madrid	Floor Exercise
Gold medal – first place	1981 Madrid	Uneven Bars
Gold medal – first place	1981 Madrid	Balance Beam
Gold medal – first place	1985 Helsinki	Uneven Bars
Silver medal – second place	1979 Copenhagen	Vault
Silver medal – second place	1981 Madrid	Vault
Silver medal – second place	1985 Helsinki	All-Around
Bronze medal – third place	1979 Copenhagen	Uneven Bars
Friendship Games
Gold medal – first place	1984 Olomouc	Uneven Bars
Gold medal – first place	1984 Olomouc	Floor Exercise
Silver medal – second place	1984 Olomouc	Team
Bronze medal – third place	1984 Olomouc	All-Around
Bronze medal – third place	1984 Olomouc	Vault
World Cup Final
Gold medal – first place	1982 Zagreb	Uneven Bars
Bronze medal – third place	1982 Zagreb	Floor Exercise

Maxi Gnauck (born 10 October 1964) is a German former artistic gymnast who represented East Germany. With a total of 27 medals at the Olympic Games, World Championships, World Cups, and European Championships she is considered one of the most successful woman gymnasts that Germany has ever produced. In 1980 she was selected East German Sportspersonality of the Year.

Her parents were expecting a boy and they planned to name him Max so, when the baby turned out to be a girl, they simply added an 'i', creating an uncommon name for Germany. When Maxi was five, her mother took her to a gymnastics centre in their area. By age eight, Maxi had won her first medals at the Kreisspartakiade. When she was nine she changed her club to SC Dynamo Berlin, where she was coached by Jürgen Heritz. Considered one of the best uneven bars competitors of all time, Maxi was also an excellent tumbler. She was one of the first female gymnasts to perform a triple twist on floor.

In April 1986, Maxi officially announced her retirement and began a four-year course in sports coaching at the University of Leipzig. In 1988 she was severely injured while sliding down a waterslide while working as an aide at a children's summer camp by the Baltic Sea. She broke her C5 vertebra and was nearly paralysed. Three vertebrae were later reinforced with a metal plate.

Facing a strong competition after the reunification of East Germany and West Germany, she first took temporary coaching positions in South Africa and Great Britain, both for a few months in 1990. From 1993 until 2004 she worked as a full-time coach at the Harksheide Gymnastics Center in Norderstedt near Hamburg. Since 2005 she has worked at the Artistic and Apparatus Gymnastics Center (Kunst- und Gerätturnzentrum) at Liestal in Switzerland. In 2000, she was inducted into the International Gymnastics Hall of Fame. She is the first German gymnast to be awarded that honour.

== Results ==
Year	Competition	Placing(s)
1977	East German Children's Spartakiade	1st All-Around
1977	East German Juniors Championships	5th All-Around
1977	East Germany-Czechoslovakia Juniors Dual Meet	1st Team, 1st All-Around
1978	Chunichi Cup	4th All-Around
1978	DTV Cup	5th All-Around
1978	East Germany-Hungary Dual Meet	1st team, 3rd All-Around
1978	Junior Friendship Tournament	2nd Team, 3rd All-Around, 2nd Floor, 4th Bars, 6th Vault
1979	Cottbus International	1st All-Around
1979	European Championships	2nd Vault, 3rd Bars, 6th All-Around
1979	East German Championships	2nd All-Around
1979	East German Cup	4th All-Around
1979	East Germany-Norway-Sweden Tri-Meet	1st Team, 1st All-Around
1979	World Championships	3rd Team, 2nd All-Around, 1st Bars, 4th Floor, 6th Vault
1980	Cottbus International	1st All-Around, 1st bars, 1st Beam, 1st Floor
1980	East German Championships	4th All-Around
1980	East Germany-Hungary Dual Meet	1st Team, 1st All-Around
1980	Olympic Games	3rd Team, 2nd All-Around, 1st Bars, 3rd Floor, 4th Beam, 6th Vault
1980	World Cup	2nd All-Around, 1st Bars, 1st Floor, 6th Vault
1981	Cottbus International	1st All-Around, 1st Bars, 1st Floor, 2nd Vault, 2nd Beam
1981	European Championships	1st All-Around, 1st Bars, 1st Beam, 1st Floor, 2nd Vault
1981	East German Championships	1st All-Around
1981	East Germany-Norway-Sweden Tri-Meet	1st All-Around
1981	World Championships	1st Vault, 1st Bars, 1st Beam, 3rd Team
1982	East German Championships	1st All-Around, 1st Vault, 1st Bars, 1st Floor
1982	East Germany-Hungary Dual Meet	1st Team, 1st All-Around
1982	World Cup	5th All-Around, 1st Bars, 3rd Floor, 7th Vault
1983	Chunichi Cup	4th All-Around, 1st Floor
1983	Cottbus International	1st Vault, 1st Floor, 3rd All-Around
1983	Tokyo Cup	1st Bars, 1st Floor
1983	World Championships	1st Bars, 3rd Team, 4th Vault, 4th Beam, 7th All-Around
1984	Cottbus International	1st Vault, 1st Floor, 4th All-Around
1984	Friendship Games in Olomouc	1st Bars, 1st Floor, 3rd All-Around, 3rd Vault, 5th Beam
1984	DTB Cup	1st All-Around, 1st Bars, 1st Floor, 2nd Vault, 5th Beam
1984	East German Championships	1st All-Around, 1st Bars, 1st Floor, 3rd Vault
1985	Cottbus International	1st Floor, 2nd All-Around, 2nd Vault
1985	European Championships	1st Bars, 2nd All-Around, 4th Vault

== See also ==
- List of top medalists at the World Artistic Gymnastics Championships

Awards
Preceded by (East Germany) Marita Koch	East German Sportswoman of the Year; 1980	Succeeded by (East Germany) Ute Geweniger
