= Simona Renciu =

Romanian artistic gymnast

- Born: 21 December 1967 (age 58)

Gymnastics career
- Discipline: Women's artistic gymnastics
- Country represented: Romania
- Head coach: Adrian Goreac
- Assistant coaches: Octavian Bellu, Maria Cosma
Medal record
World Championships
Silver medal – second place	1983 Budapest	Team competition

Simona Renciu (born 21 December 1967) is a retired Romanian artistic gymnast. In 1983 she won the silver world medal with the team at the 1983 World Championships. After retirement she emigrated to Luxemburg, where she is working as a judge for the Luxemburg Gymnastics Federation and as a gymnastics coach at the Le Réveil Bettenbourg Club.
