= 1983 World Artistic Gymnastics Championships =

Gymnastics competition

- Location: Budapest, Hungary

The 22nd Artistic Gymnastics World Championships were held in Budapest, the capital of Hungary, in 1983.

== Results ==
Event	Gold	Silver	Bronze
Men
Team all-around	China; Tong Fei; Li Ning; Lou Yun; Xu Zhiqiang; Li Xiaoping; Li Yuejiu	Soviet Union; Dmitry Bilozerchev; Artur Akopyan; Alexander Pogorelov; Vladimir Artemov; Yury Korolev; Bogdan Makuts	Japan; Koji Gushiken; Koji Sotomura; Nobuyuki Kajitani; Mitsuaki Watanabe; Noritoshi Hirata; Shinji Morisue
Individual all-around	(Soviet Union) Dmitry Bilozerchev	(Japan) Koji Gushiken	(China) Lou Yun (Soviet Union) Artur Akopyan
Floor	(China) Tong Fei	(Soviet Union) Dmitry Bilozerchev	(China) Li Ning
Pommel horse	(Soviet Union) Dmitry Bilozerchev	(China) Li Xiaoping (Hungary) György Guczoghy	none awarded
Rings	(Japan) Koji Gushiken (Soviet Union) Dmitry Bilozerchev	none awarded	(China) Li Ning
Vault	(Soviet Union) Artur Akopyan	(China) Li Ning	(East Germany) Bernd Jensch
Parallel bars	(China) Lou Yun (Soviet Union) Vladimir Artemov	none awarded	(China) Tong Fei (Japan) Koji Sotomura
Horizontal Bar	(Soviet Union) Dmitry Bilozerchev	(France) Philippe Vatuone (Soviet Union) Alexander Pogorelov	none awarded
Women
Team all-around	Soviet Union; Olga Bicherova; Tatiana Frolova; Olga Mostepanova; Natalia Ilienko; Albina Shishova; Natalia Yurchenko	Romania; Lavinia Agache; Mirela Barbălată; Laura Cutina; Simona Renciu; Mihaela Stănuleţ; Ecaterina Szabo	East Germany; Maxi Gnauck; Gabriele Fähnrich; Astrid Heese; Diana Morawe; Silvia Rau; Bettina Schieferdecker
Individual all-around	(Soviet Union) Natalia Yurchenko	(Soviet Union) Olga Mostepanova	(Romania) Ecaterina Szabo
Vault	(Bulgaria) Boriana Stoyanova	(Romania) Lavinia Agache (Romania) Ecaterina Szabo	none awarded
Uneven bars	(East Germany) Maxi Gnauck	(Romania) Lavinia Agache (Romania) Ecaterina Szabo	none awarded
Balance beam	(Soviet Union) Olga Mostepanova	(Czechoslovakia) Hana Říčná	(Romania) Lavinia Agache
Floor	(Romania) Ecaterina Szabo	(Soviet Union) Olga Mostepanova	(Bulgaria) Boriana Stoyanova

== Men ==
=== Team Final ===
Rank	Team	Floor		Pommel horse		Rings		Vault		Parallel bars		Horizontal bar		Total
Rank	Team	C	O	C	O	C	O	C	O	C	O	C	O	Total
Gold medal	China	98.350		98.350		98.800		98.550		98.900		98.450		591.450
Gold medal	Tong Fei	9.850	9.950	9.900	9.850	9.900	9.900	9.900	9.750	10.000	9.900	9.900	9.900	118.700
Gold medal	Li Ning	9.850	9.950	9.950	9.850	9.900	10.000	9.900	9.900	9.850	9.900	9.900	9.450	118.400
Gold medal	Lou Yun	9.850	9.800	9.700	9.650	9.700	9.900	9.900	9.900	9.900	10.000	9.800	9.750	117.850
Gold medal	Xu Zhiqiang	9.700	9.700	9.800	9.800	9.800	9.950	9.750	9.900	9.800	9.900	9.800	9.900	117.800
Gold medal	Li Xiaoping	9.650	9.650	9.950	9.900	9.800	9.850	9.800	9.800	9.700	9.850	9.650	9.900	117.550
Gold medal	Li Yuejiu	9.800	9.900	9.700	9.600	9.800	9.800	9.700	9.800	9.800	9.800	9.700	9.900	117.300
Silver medal	Soviet Union	98.200		99.100		98.750		98.550		98.500		98.300		591.350
Silver medal	Dmitry Bilozerchev	9.900	9.950	10.000	10.000	9.900	9.950	9.850	9.900	9.650	9.900	9.800	9.900	118.700
Silver medal	Artur Akopyan	9.650	9.850	9.900	9.900	9.800	9.900	9.950	9.900	9.750	9.850	9.800	9.900	118.150
Silver medal	Alexander Pogorelov	9.750	9.900	9.900	9.900	9.850	9.800	9.750	9.800	9.800	9.900	9.800	9.950	118.100
Silver medal	Vladimir Artemov	9.600	9.800	9.900	9.800	9.700	9.900	9.800	9.900	9.900	10.000	9.700	9.800	117.800
Silver medal	Yuri Korolev	9.850	9.850	9.900	9.900	9.800	9.950	9.800	9.900	9.800	9.900	8.850	9.900	117.400
Silver medal	Bogdan Makuts	9.700	9.750	9.800	9.750	9.750	9.950	9.700	9.800	9.650	9.900	9.700	9.850	117.250
Bronze medal	Japan	97.300		97.950		98.100		98.300		98.300		98.800		588.850
Bronze medal	Koji Gushiken	9.800	9.350	9.900	9.900	9.900	9.950	9.800	9.900	9.900	9.900	9.850	9.900	118.050
Bronze medal	Koji Sotomura	9.800	9.800	9.700	9.800	9.900	9.900	9.700	9.850	9.800	9.900	9.750	9.800	117.700
Bronze medal	Nobuyuki Kajitani	9.650	9.700	9.800	9.850	9.800	9.850	9.650	9.800	9.900	9.750	9.700	9.900	117.350
Bronze medal	Mitsuaki Watanabe	9.700	9.750	9.650	9.700	9.650	9.750	9.800	9.850	9.850	9.800	9.900	9.900	117.300
Bronze medal	Noritoshi Hirata	9.400	9.750	9.750	9.900	9.700	9.350	9.850	9.900	9.800	9.700	9.800	9.900	116.800
Bronze medal	Shinji Morisue	9.600	9.750	9.550	9.400	9.550	9.700	9.850	9.900	9.800	9.650	9.900	10.000	116.650
4	United States	97.300		97.850		98.050		97.100		97.300		98.050		585.650
4	Mitch Gaylord	9.700	9.650	9.650	9.750	9.850	9.850	9.650	9.800	9.750	9.850	9.800	9.850	117.150
4	Peter Vidmar	9.650	9.750	9.800	9.900	9.900	9.800	9.750	9.800	9.250	9.500	9.900	9.900	116.900
4	Bart Conner	9.900	9.750	9.900	9.900	9.800	9.600	9.550	9.350	9.800	9.900	9.800	9.350	116.600
4	Jim Hartung	9.600	9.700	9.700	9.800	9.700	9.800	9.700	9.750	9.600	9.700	9.600	9.750	116.400
4	Tim Daggett	9.650	9.500	9.650	9.800	9.700	9.850	9.550	9.600	9.700	9.700	9.750	9.900	116.350
4	Scott Johnson	9.700	9.850	9.500	9.600	9.650	9.800	9.700	9.800	9.600	9.700	9.400	9.800	116.100

=== All-around ===
Rank	Gymnast	Floor (gymnastics)	Pommel horse	Rings (gymnastics)	Vault (gymnastics)	Parallel bars	Horizontal bar	Score	Prelim score	Total
1st place, gold medalist(s)	Dmitry Bilozerchev (URS)	10.000	9.950	9.950	10.000	9.950	10.000	59.850	59.350	119.200
2nd place, silver medalist(s)	Koji Gushiken (JPN)	9.900	9.950	9.900	9.900	9.850	9.900	59.400	59.025	118.425
3rd place, bronze medalist(s)	Lou Yun (CHN)	9.900	9.800	9.900	9.950	9.900	9.750	59.200	58.925	118.125
3rd place, bronze medalist(s)	Artur Akopyan (URS)	9.800	9.900	9.850	9.850	9.800	9.850	59.050	59.075	118.125
5	György Guczoghy (HUN)	9.850	10.000	9.950	9.800	9.750	9.800	59.150	58.825	117.975
6	Li Ning (CHN)	9.900	9.400	9.900	9.900	9.600	9.900	58.600	59.200	117.800
7	Nobuyuki Kajitani (JPN)	9.700	9.800	9.800	9.800	9.850	9.900	58.850	58.675	117.525
8	Mitch Gaylord (USA)	9.700	9.800	9.900	9.800	9.700	9.800	58.700	58.575	117.425
9	Peter Vidmar (USA)	9.700	9.800	9.900	9.800	9.700	9.800	58.700	58.450	117.150
9	Alexander Pogorelov (URS)	9.750	9.900	10.000	9.900	9.200	9.300	58.100	59.050	117.150
11	Bart Conner (USA)	9.650	9.850	9.800	9.800	9.800	9.900	58.800	58.300	117.100
12	Ulf Hoffmann (GDR)	9.550	9.750	9.900	9.900	9.700	9.850	58.650	58.425	117.075
13	Jens Fischer (GDR)	9.800	9.550	9.700	9.850	9.650	9.900	58.450	58.600	117.050
14	Ferenc Donath (HUN)	9.650	9.850	9.800	9.850	9.650	9.850	58.650	58.200	116.850
15	Casimiro Suarez (CUB)	9.850	9.550	9.850	9.900	9.700	9.850	58.700	58.050	116.750
15	Sylvio Kroll (GDR)	9.650	9.900	9.800	9.900	8.950	9.900	58.100	58.650	116.750
17	Koji Sotomura (JPN)	9.700	9.750	9.900	9.900	9.200	9.300	57.750	58.850	116.600
18	Li Chol-Hon (PRK)	9.850	9.900	9.800	9.800	9.700	9.500	58.550	58.000	116.550
19	Sepp Zellweger (SUI)	9.800	9.700	9.750	9.800	9.750	9.750	58.550	57.875	116.425
20	Markus Lehmann (SUI)	9.750	9.700	9.800	9.750	9.400	9.700	58.100	57.875	115.975
20	Emilian Nicula (ROU)	9.700	9.800	9.850	9.800	9.400	9.850	58.400	57.575	115.975
22	Jean-Luc Cairon (FRA)	9.700	9.800	9.700	9.800	9.400	9.800	58.200	57.750	115.950
23	Jurgen Geiger (FRG)	9.700	9.800	9.800	9.800	9.300	9.400	57.800	58.100	115.900
24	Daniel Wunderlun (SUI)	9.750	9.600	9.600	9.750	9.650	9.800	58.150	57.725	115.875
24	Laurent Barbieri (FRA)	9.800	9.700	9.700	9.800	9.450	9.750	58.200	57.675	115.875
26	Jeno Paprika (HUN)	9.600	9.750	9.650	9.800	9.450	9.800	58.050	57.775	115.825
27	Andreas Japtok (FRG)	9.450	9.600	9.800	9.800	9.650	9.750	58.050	57.750	115.800
28	Borislav Hutov (BUL)	9.550	9.450	9.700	9.800	9.200	9.800	57.500	58.025	115.525
29	Roberto Leon (CUB)	9.550	9.800	9.550	9.700	9.850	9.600	58.050	57.400	115.450
30	Zdravko Stoyanov (BUL)	9.700	9.350	9.700	9.800	9.550	9.800	57.900	57.500	115.400
31	Dantcho Jordanov (BUL)	9.500	9.700	9.700	9.850	9.500	9.400	57.650	57.700	115.350
32	Philippe Vatuone (FRA)	9.850	9.650	9.700	9.800	9.350	9.350	57.700	57.600	115.300
33	Daniel Winkler (FRG)	9.000	9.700	9.750	9.800	9.250	9.750	57.250	57.950	115.200
33	Li Su-Gil (PRK)	9.550	9.500	9.900	9.750	9.500	9.700	57.900	57.300	115.200
35	Tong Fei (CHN)	9.500	9.500	9.450	8.700	9.850	8.750	55.750	59.350	115.100
36	Li Gil-Su (PRK)	9.500	9.900	9.650	9.750	9.600	7.500	55.900	57.375	113.275

=== Floor Exercise ===
Rank	Gymnast	Score	Prelim score	Total
1st place, gold medalist(s)	Tong Fei (CHN)	10.000	9.900	19.900
2nd place, silver medalist(s)	Dmitry Bilozerchev (URS)	9.950	9.925	19.875
3rd place, bronze medalist(s)	Li Ning (CHN)	9.900	9.900	19.800
4	Yuri Korolev (URS)	9.900	9.850	19.750
5	Bart Conner (USA)	9.900	9.825	19.725
6	Casimiro Suarez (CUB)	9.850	9.800	19.650
7	Sylvio Kroll (GDR)	9.800	9.800	19.600
8	Koji Sotomura (JPN)	9.650	9.800	19.450

=== Pommel Horse ===
Rank	Gymnast	Score	Prelim score	Total
1st place, gold medalist(s)	Dmitry Bilozerchev (URS)	10.000	10.000	20.000
2nd place, silver medalist(s)	Li Xiaoping (CHN)	10.000	9.950	19.950
2nd place, silver medalist(s)	György Guczoghy (HUN)	10.000	9.950	19.950
4	Li Ning (CHN)	10.000	9.900	19.900
5	Yuri Korolev (URS)	9.950	9.900	19.850
5	Sylvio Kroll (GDR)	9.950	9.900	19.850
7	Bart Conner (USA)	9.900	9.900	19.800
7	Koji Gushiken (JPN)	9.900	9.900	19.800

=== Rings ===
Rank	Gymnast	Score	Prelim score	Total
1st place, gold medalist(s)	Dmitry Bilozerchev (URS)	10.000	9.925	19.925
1st place, gold medalist(s)	Koji Gushiken (JPN)	10.000	9.925	19.925
3rd place, bronze medalist(s)	Li Ning (CHN)	9.950	9.950	19.900
4	Koji Sotomura (JPN)	9.900	9.900	19.800
4	Jens Fischer (GDR)	9.900	9.900	19.800
6	Ferenc Donáth (HUN)	9.850	9.900	19.750
7	Plamen Petkov (BUL)	9.800	9.900	19.700
7	Levente Molnár (ROU)	9.800	9.900	19.700

=== Vault ===
Rank	Gymnast	Score	Prelim score	Total
1st place, gold medalist(s)	Artur Akopyan (URS)	9.950	9.925	19.875
2nd place, silver medalist(s)	Li Ning (CHN)	9.950	9.900	19.850
3rd place, bronze medalist(s)	Bernd Jensch (GDR)	9.975	9.850	19.825
4	Lou Yun (CHN)	9.900	9.900	19.800
4	Sylvio Kroll (GDR)	9.900	9.900	19.800
6	Dmitry Bilozerchev (URS)	9.900	9.875	19.775
7	Shinji Morisue (JPN)	9.875	9.875	19.750
8	Noritoshi Hirata (JPN)	9.850	9.875	19.725

=== Parallel Bars ===
Rank	Gymnast	Score	Prelim score	Total
1st place, gold medalist(s)	Lou Yun (CHN)	10.000	9.950	19.950
1st place, gold medalist(s)	Vladimir Artemov (URS)	10.000	9.950	19.950
3rd place, bronze medalist(s)	Tong Fei (CHN)	9.900	9.950	19.850
3rd place, bronze medalist(s)	Koji Sotomura (JPN)	10.000	9.850	19.850
5	Koji Gushiken (JPN)	9.900	9.900	19.800
6	Bart Conner (USA)	9.900	9.850	19.750
6	Yuri Korolev (URS)	9.900	9.850	19.750
8	Roberto Leon (CUB)	9.900	9.825	19.725

=== Horizontal Bar ===
Rank	Gymnast	Score	Prelim score	Total
1st place, gold medalist(s)	Dmitry Bilozerchev (URS)	10.000	9.850	19.850
2nd place, silver medalist(s)	Alexander Pogorelov (URS)	9.950	9.875	19.825
2nd place, silver medalist(s)	Philippe Vatuone (FRA)	9.950	9.875	19.825
4	Tong Fei (CHN)	9.900	9.900	19.800
4	Shinji Morisue (JPN)	9.850	9.950	19.800
6	Xu Zhiqiang (CHN)	9.900	9.850	19.750
7	Mitsuaki Watanabe (JPN)	9.600	9.900	19.500
8	Peter Vidmar (USA)	9.350	9.900	19.250

== Women ==
=== Team Final ===
Rank	Team	Vault		Uneven bars		Balance beam		Floor		Total
Rank	Team	C	O	C	O	C	O	C	O	Total
1st place, gold medalist(s)	Soviet Union	98.500		98.550		97.950		98.450		393.450
1st place, gold medalist(s)	Natalia Yurchenko	9.800	10.000	9.900	9.950	9.800	10.000	9.850	9.900	79.200
1st place, gold medalist(s)	Olga Mostepanova	9.700	10.000	9.900	9.750	9.850	9.900	9.900	9.900	78.900
1st place, gold medalist(s)	Tatiana Frolova	9.750	9.850	9.800	9.950	9.700	9.800	9.800	9.800	78.450
1st place, gold medalist(s)	Olga Bicherova	9.750	10.000	9.750	9.900	9.650	9.600	9.850	9.800	78.300
1st place, gold medalist(s)	Albina Shishova	9.700	9.900	9.750	9.800	9.700	9.900	9.700	9.750	78.200
1st place, gold medalist(s)	Natalia Ilienko	9.700	9.900	9.800	9.800	9.700	9.450	9.900	9.600	77.850
2nd place, silver medalist(s)	Romania	99.000		97.900		97.050		98.150		392.100
2nd place, silver medalist(s)	Lavinia Agache	9.900	9.900	9.800	10.000	9.750	9.900	9.900	9.900	79.050
2nd place, silver medalist(s)	Ecaterina Szabo	9.900	9.900	9.800	10.000	9.850	9.450	9.950	10.000	78.850
2nd place, silver medalist(s)	Laura Cutina	9.900	9.850	9.450	9.900	9.650	9.650	9.800	9.850	78.050
2nd place, silver medalist(s)	Mihaela Stănuleț	9.800	9.950	9.500	9.850	9.600	9.800	9.800	9.550	77.850
2nd place, silver medalist(s)	Simona Renciu	9.700	9.750	9.650	9.900	9.550	9.650	9.700	9.650	77.550
2nd place, silver medalist(s)	Mirela Barbălată	9.900	10.000	9.500	9.750	9.450	9.650	9.750	9.300	77.300
3rd place, bronze medalist(s)	East Germany	97.900		97.650		96.350		97.350		389.250
3rd place, bronze medalist(s)	Maxi Gnauck	9.900	9.950	9.850	10.000	9.900	9.850	9.900	9.300	78.650
3rd place, bronze medalist(s)	Silvia Rau	9.900	9.850	9.700	9.900	9.900	9.800	9.800	9.500	78.350
3rd place, bronze medalist(s)	Gabriele Fähnrich	9.650	9.650	9.750	9.950	9.700	9.250	9.700	9.700	77.350
3rd place, bronze medalist(s)	Bettina Schieferdecker	9.750	9.800	9.650	9.500	9.500	9.500	9.700	9.650	77.050
3rd place, bronze medalist(s)	Diana Morawe	9.700	9.750	8.950	9.800	9.500	9.300	9.850	9.800	76.650
3rd place, bronze medalist(s)	Astrid Heese	9.650	9.650	9.550	8.200	9.650	9.200	9.700	9.750	75.350
4	Bulgaria	97.800		97.350		96.200		97.600		388.950
4	Boriana Stoyanova	9.900	9.900	9.650	9.900	9.550	9.850	9.900	9.900	78.550
4	Zoya Grancharova	9.800	9.800	9.650	9.800	9.550	9.750	9.850	9.800	78.000
4	Silvia Topalova	9.800	9.700	9.700	9.950	9.500	9.750	9.800	9.550	77.750
4	Bojanka Demireva	9.700	9.750	9.550	9.750	9.400	9.700	9.800	9.750	77.400
4	Diana Dudeva	9.600	9.700	9.400	9.900	9.450	9.600	9.700	9.400	76.750
4	Darina Lazarova	9.650	9.800	9.450	9.800	9.500	9.300	9.650	9.550	76.700

=== All-around ===
Rank	Gymnast	Vault (gymnastics)	Uneven bars	Balance beam	Floor (gymnastics)	Score	Prelim score	Total
1st place, gold medalist(s)	Natalia Yurchenko (URS)	10.000	9.850	9.900	10.000	39.750	39.600	79.350
2nd place, silver medalist(s)	Olga Mostepanova (URS)	10.000	9.800	9.900	9.850	39.550	39.450	79.000
3rd place, bronze medalist(s)	Ecaterina Szabo (ROU)	10.000	9.950	9.600	10.000	39.550	39.425	78.975
4	Boriana Stoyanova (BUL)	9.900	9.900	9.800	9.900	39.500	39.275	78.775
5	Tatiana Frolova (URS)	9.800	9.900	9.900	9.900	39.500	39.225	78.725
6	Lavinia Agache (ROU)	9.900	9.900	9.350	9.900	39.050	39.525	78.575
7	Maxi Gnauck (GDR)	9.900	10.000	9.300	9.900	39.100	39.325	78.425
8	Zoya Grancharova (BUL)	9.800	9.900	9.800	9.850	39.350	39.000	78.350
9	Laura Cutina (ROU)	9.900	9.850	9.800	9.700	39.250	39.025	78.275
10	Chen Yongyan (CHN)	9.800	9.850	9.750	9.800	39.200	38.975	78.175
11	Kathy Johnson (USA)	9.900	9.800	9.800	9.800	39.300	38.850	78.150
12	Silvia Rau (GDR)	9.800	9.900	9.400	9.750	38.850	39.175	78.025
13	Silvia Topalova (BUL)	9.800	9.850	9.800	9.600	39.050	38.875	77.925
14	Hana Říčná (TCH)	9.600	9.900	9.800	9.750	39.050	38.725	77.775
15	Gabriele Fähnrich (GDR)	9.600	9.950	9.800	9.700	39.050	38.675	77.725
16	Julianne McNamara (USA)	9.850	9.900	9.550	9.250	38.550	39.025	77.575
17	Jana Labáková (TCH)	9.800	9.800	9.250	9.750	38.600	38.800	77.400
18	Erika Csányi (HUN)	9.800	9.750	9.250	9.750	38.550	38.400	76.950
19	Choe Jong-sil (PRK)	9.800	9.700	9.500	9.600	38.600	38.250	76.850
19	Yvonne Haug (FRG)	9.900	9.800	9.500	9.050	38.250	38.600	76.850
21	Zhou Qiurui (CHN)	9.800	9.800	9.250	9.700	38.550	38.075	76.625
22	Tanya Service (USA)	9.800	9.250	9.600	9.650	38.300	38.200	76.500
23	Anja Wilhelm (FRG)	9.750	9.250	9.250	9.700	37.950	38.500	76.450
24	Krisztina Köteles (HUN)	9.800	9.500	9.200	9.700	38.200	38.225	76.425
25	Bonnie Wittmeier (CAN)	9.650	9.600	9.400	9.650	38.300	38.025	76.325
25	Martina Polcrová (TCH)	9.750	9.750	9.350	9.000	37.850	38.475	76.325
27	Maiko Morio (JPN)	9.800	9.650	9.650	9.450	38.550	37.700	76.250
28	Éva Óvári (HUN)	9.700	9.600	9.050	9.500	37.850	38.325	76.175
29	Ana Manso (ESP)	9.700	9.700	9.550	9.350	38.300	37.825	76.125
30	Laura Bortolaso (ITA)	9.800	9.750	9.500	8.950	38.000	37.950	75.950
31	Laura Muñoz (ESP)	9.750	9.650	9.100	9.500	38.000	37.850	75.850
32	Romi Kessler (SUI)	9.800	9.750	8.450	9.500	37.500	38.200	75.700
33	Britta Lehmann (FRG)	9.650	8.400	9.400	9.400	36.850	38.375	75.225
34	Choi Men-hi (PRK)	9.800	8.900	9.150	9.150	37.000	37.675	74.674
35	Ri Sun-ok (PRK)	9.400	8.400	9.600	9.250	36.650	37.650	74.300
36	Andrea Thomas (CAN)	0.000	0.000	8.500	0.000	8.500	37.875	46.375

=== Vault ===
Rank	Gymnast	Score	Prelim score	Total
1st place, gold medalist(s)	Boriana Stoyanova (BUL)	9.925	9.900	19.825
2nd place, silver medalist(s)	Ecaterina Szabo (ROU)	9.900	9.900	19.800
2nd place, silver medalist(s)	Lavinia Agache (ROU)	9.900	9.900	19.800
4	Maxi Gnauck (GDR)	9.850	9.925	19.775
5	Olga Bicherova (URS)	9.775	9.875	19.650
6	Silvia Rau (GDR)	9.750	9.875	19.625
6	Julianne McNamara (USA)	9.750	9.875	19.625
8	Natalia Yurchenko (URS)	9.600	9.900	19.500

=== Uneven Bars ===
Rank	Gymnast	Score	Prelim score	Total
1st place, gold medalist(s)	Maxi Gnauck (GDR)	10.000	9.925	19.925
2nd place, silver medalist(s)	Ecaterina Szabo (ROU)	9.900	9.900	19.800
2nd place, silver medalist(s)	Lavinia Agache (ROU)	9.900	9.900	19.800
4	Tatiana Frolova (URS)	9.900	9.875	19.775
5	Gabriele Fähnrich (GDR)	9.900	9.850	19.750
6	Silvia Topalova (BUL)	9.800	9.825	19.625
7	Julianne McNamara (USA)	9.400	9.900	19.300
8	Hana Říčná (TCH)	9.350	9.850	19.200

=== Balance Beam ===
Rank	Gymnast	Score	Prelim score	Total
1st place, gold medalist(s)	Olga Mostepanova (URS)	9.900	9.875	19.775
2nd place, silver medalist(s)	Hana Říčná (TCH)	9.850	9.900	19.750
3rd place, bronze medalist(s)	Lavinia Agache (ROU)	9.850	9.825	19.675
4	Maxi Gnauck (GDR)	9.400	9.875	19.275
5	Tatiana Frolova (URS)	9.500	9.750	19.250
5	Silvia Rau (GDR)	9.400	9.850	19.250
7	Iva Červenková (TCH)	9.300	9.900	19.200
8	Anja Wilhelm (FRG)	9.400	9.725	19.125

=== Floor Exercise ===
Rank	Gymnast	Score	Prelim score	Total
1st place, gold medalist(s)	Ecaterina Szabo (ROU)	10.000	9.975	19.975
2nd place, silver medalist(s)	Olga Mostepanova (URS)	10.000	9.900	19.900
3rd place, bronze medalist(s)	Boriana Stoyanova (BUL)	9.950	9.900	19.850
4	Lavinia Agache (ROU)	9.900	9.900	19.800
5	Zoya Grancharova (BUL)	9.900	9.825	19.725
6	Chen Yongyan (CHN)	9.900	9.800	19.700
7	Diana Morawe (GDR)	9.750	9.825	19.575
8	Kathy Johnson (USA)	9.400	9.775	19.175

== Medals ==
Rank	Nation	Gold	Silver	Bronze	Total
1	Soviet Union (URS)	9	5	1	15
2	China (CHN)	3	2	4	9
3	Romania (ROU)	1	5	2	8
4	Japan (JPN)	1	1	2	4
5	East Germany (GDR)	1	0	2	3
6	Bulgaria (BUL)	1	0	1	2
7	Czechoslovakia (TCH)	0	1	0	1
7	France (FRA)	0	1	0	1
7	Hungary (HUN)	0	1	0	1
Totals (9 entries)		16	16	12	44
