= Alena Dřevjaná =

Czech artistic gymnast (born 1969)

- Born: 4 July 1969 (age 57) Opava, Czechoslovakia

Gymnastics career
- Discipline: Women's artistic gymnastics
- Country represented: Czechoslovakia
Medal record
Friendship Games
Bronze medal – third place	1984 Olomouc	Beam
Bronze medal – third place	1984 Olomouc	Team

Alena Coufalová Dřevjaná (born 4 July 1969) is a Czech former artistic gymnast who represented Czechoslovakia at the 1988 Summer Olympics, finishing seventh in the team final and 26th in the all-around final.

She finished ninth in the all-around final of the 1985 European Championships. At the Friendship Games in 1984, organized for the countries of the communist bloc instead of the 1984 Los Angeles Olympics, she won bronze medal in team competition and in the balance beam final.

Dřevjaná (married Coufalová) is mother of figure skaters Petr Coufal and Jana Coufalová and football player Vladimír Coufal.
