= Mirela Barbălată =

Romanian artistic gymnast

- Born: October 23, 1967 (age 58)

Gymnastics career
- Discipline: Women's artistic gymnastics
- Country represented: Romania
- Club: CSM Onesti
- Head coach: Adrian Goreac
- Assistant coaches: Octavian Bellu, Maria Cosma
Medal record
World Championships
Silver medal – second place	1983 Budapest	Team competition

Mirela Barbălată (-Hübner) (born October 23, 1967) is a Romanian retired artistic gymnast. At the 1983 World Championships, she won a silver medal with the Romanian team and scored a perfect ten on vault, the highest qualifying score for the vault final. However, she did not compete in the final; the Romanian finalists were Lavinia Agache and Ecaterina Szabo, who won the silver and bronze medals, respectively.

After retiring from gymnastics, Barbălată immigrated to Germany. There, she married the German marathoner Christian Hübner, with whom she competes in marathons.

== Competitive history ==
Year	Event	Team	AA	VT	UB	BB	FX
1982	HOL-ROM Dual Meet	1st place, gold medalist(s)	7				
1982	Junior Friendship Tournament	2nd place, silver medalist(s)	6	1st place, gold medalist(s)			2nd place, silver medalist(s)
1983	GBR-ROM Dual Meet	1st place, gold medalist(s)					
1983	Moscow News			3rd place, bronze medalist(s)			
1983	Riga International			2nd place, silver medalist(s)			
1983	World Championships	2nd place, silver medalist(s)					
1984	Cottbus International		2nd place, silver medalist(s)	2nd place, silver medalist(s)	3rd place, bronze medalist(s)	2nd place, silver medalist(s)	6
1984	FRG-ROM-HUN Tri-Meet	1st place, gold medalist(s)	10				
1985	Summer Universiade	2nd place, silver medalist(s)	4				
