= Dmitry Bilozerchev =

Russian gymnast (born 1966)

- Дмитрий Билозерчев
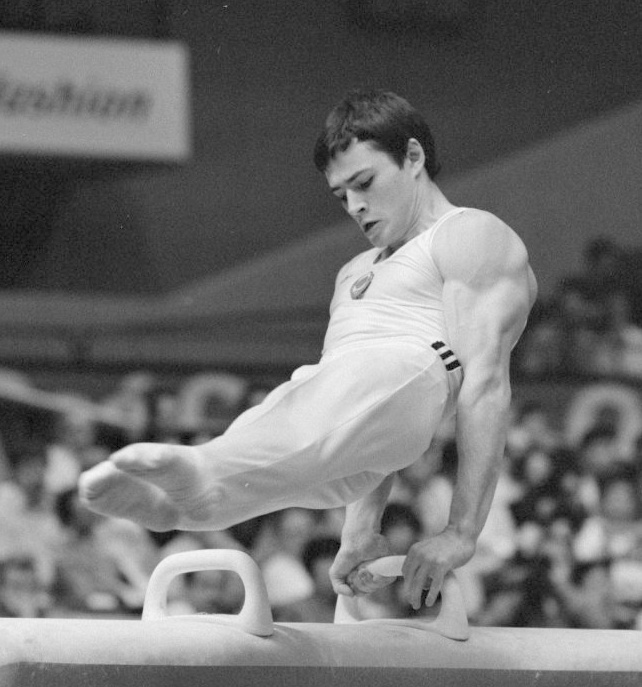
- Bilozerchev in 1987

Personal information
- Full name: Dmitry Vladimirovich Bilozerchev
- Born: 22 December 1966 (age 59) Moscow, Russian SFSR, Soviet Union
- Height: 1.69 m (5 ft 7 in)

Gymnastics career
- Discipline: Men's artistic gymnastics
- Country represented: Soviet Union
- Club: CSKA Moscow
Medal record
Olympic Games
Gold medal – first place	1988 Seoul	Team competition
Gold medal – first place	1988 Seoul	Pommel horse
Gold medal – first place	1988 Seoul	Rings
Bronze medal – third place	1988 Seoul	All-around
World Championships
Gold medal – first place	1983 Budapest	All-around
Gold medal – first place	1983 Budapest	Pommel horse
Gold medal – first place	1983 Budapest	Still rings
Gold medal – first place	1983 Budapest	High bar
Gold medal – first place	1987 Rotterdam	Team competition
Gold medal – first place	1987 Rotterdam	All-around
Gold medal – first place	1987 Rotterdam	Pommel horse
Gold medal – first place	1987 Rotterdam	High bar
Silver medal – second place	1983 Budapest	Team competition
Silver medal – second place	1983 Budapest	Floor exercise
Silver medal – second place	1987 Rotterdam	Still rings
Silver medal – second place	1987 Rotterdam	Parallel bars
European Championships
Gold medal – first place	1983 Varna	All-around
Gold medal – first place	1983 Varna	Still rings
Gold medal – first place	1983 Varna	Vault
Gold medal – first place	1983 Varna	High bar
Gold medal – first place	1985 Oslo	All-around
Gold medal – first place	1985 Oslo	Floor exercise
Gold medal – first place	1985 Oslo	Pommel horse
Gold medal – first place	1985 Oslo	Still rings
Gold medal – first place	1985 Oslo	Parallel bars
Gold medal – first place	1985 Oslo	High bar
Silver medal – second place	1985 Oslo	Vault
Friendship Games
Gold medal – first place	1984 Olomouc	Team competition
Gold medal – first place	1984 Olomouc	All-around
Gold medal – first place	1984 Olomouc	High bar
Gold medal – first place	1984 Olomouc	Pommel horse
Gold medal – first place	1984 Olomouc	Still rings
Bronze medal – third place	1984 Olomouc	Vault

Dmitry Vladimirovich Bilozerchev (Russian: Дмитрий Владимирович Билозерчев, born 22 December 1966) is a Russian gymnastics coach and retired gymnast who represented the Soviet Union. One of the most accomplished gymnasts in history, he is a two-time World All-Around Champion and three-time Olympic Champion. He trained at the Armed Forces sports society in Moscow.

== Gymnastics career ==
Known for his exemplary form, style, and technique, Bilozerchev became the World All-Around Champion in 1983 when he was 16 years old. He held the record as the youngest man to win that title until Feng Jing in 2001.

Bilozerchev went on to win five gold medals at the 1984 Friendship Games, which served as the alternate Olympic Games for the communist nations that boycotted the 1984 Los Angeles Olympics. The following year, he shattered his leg in 41 places in a car crash. The injury was so devastating that doctors were going to amputate the limb were it not for his status as World Champion. In a remarkable comeback, Bilozerchev reclaimed his title as World All-Around Champion in 1987, though his leg was never the same.

At the 1988 Seoul Olympics, Bilozerchev won gold medals in the pommel horse, still rings, and in the team competition. On the final event of the team competition, the horizontal bar, he fell on a difficult serious of one-armed elements and barely qualified for the all-around competition, where he ultimately won the bronze medal. Had the competition been held under the "new life" rule that was implemented the following year, in which preliminary scores are dropped and results are determined by gymnasts' performances in the all-around final only, Bilozerchev would have won the gold medal over teammate Vladimir Artemov.

According to a report in Sovetsky Sport, Bilozerchev and teammate Vladimir Gogoladze were removed from the Soviet men's squad for the 1989 World Championships because of a two-day drinking binge. Bilozerchev did not compete in another major international event following this incident.

In 1993, he moved to the United States. Together with his wife he owns "The United Sports Academy" in Beaverton, Oregon, where he coaches gymnastics. His son Aleksey and daughter Alice are also artistic gymnasts. In 2003, he was inducted into the International Gymnastics Hall of Fame.
