= Pelc =

Pelc is a surname. Notable people with the surname include:

- Jan Pelc (born 1957), Czech writer
- Jerzy Pelc (1924–2017), logician
- Stanislav Pelc (born 1955), Czechoslovak footballer
- Sylwia Pelc (born 1990), Polish volleyball player
