= Natalia Yurchenko =

Soviet artistic gymnast

Natalia Yurchenko Наталья Юрченко
- Full name: Russian: Наталья Владимировна Юрченко
- Born: 26 January 1965 (age 61) Norilsk, Russian SFSR, Soviet Union
- Height: 155 cm (5 ft 1 in)

Gymnastics career
- Discipline: Women's artistic gymnastics
- Country represented: Soviet Union (1978–86 (URS))
- Former countries represented: Russia
- Eponymous skills: Yurchenko, Yurchenko loop
Medal record
Representing Soviet Union
World Championships
Gold medal – first place	1983 Budapest	Team
Gold medal – first place	1983 Budapest	All-Around
Gold medal – first place	1985 Montreal	Team
World Cup Final
Gold medal – first place	1982 Zagreb	All-Around
Gold medal – first place	1982 Zagreb	Vault
Gold medal – first place	1982 Zagreb	Balance Beam
Silver medal – second place	1982 Zagreb	Uneven Bars
Friendship Games
Gold medal – first place	1984 Olomouc	Team
Gold medal – first place	1984 Olomouc	Vault
Silver medal – second place	1984 Olomouc	Uneven Bars

Natalia Vladimirovna Yurchenko (Russian: Наталья Владимировна Юрченко) (born 26 January 1965) is a retired Soviet artistic gymnast, who won the women's all-around gold medal at the 1983 World Championships. Renowned for her innovative and daring gymnastics, she is best known as the originator of the Yurchenko vault family, which is a round-off back handspring entry onto the vault, and then performing a series of twists and flips off.

== Personal life ==
Yurchenko was born on 26 January 1965 in Norilsk, Russian SFSR. In 1999, she immigrated to the United States. She is married to Igor Sklyarov.

== Career ==
Yurchenko was coached by Vladislav Rastorotsky at the Dinamo sports society in Rostov on Don. Her first international competition was the 1978 Junior Friendship Tournament, where she placed 5th all-around and won gold medals in the team competition and on bars. In the same year she debuted in the senior Riga International meet, earning the bronze on the floor.

Four years later, she won the all-around title at the USSR Championships, USSR Cup, at the prestigious Moscow News tournament and the World Cup. In 1983, she won almost all gold medals (except for the floor exercise) at the University Games and the USSR Championships. She also became the all-around World Champion, achieving two perfect 10s in the process. She qualified to all the event finals, but withdrew from the uneven bars, balance beam and floor exercise finals after an injury during the vault final, leaving with two world championship titles.

At the Friendship Games in Olomouc, Yurchenko returned from injury, battled with Olga Mostepanova and managed to win the gold medal on vault and team competition. In 1985, she once again won almost all events at the University Games (except vault and balance beam), and contributed to the team's gold medal at the World Championships.

Yurchenko was awarded the title of Honoured Master of Sports of the USSR. She retired from gymnastics in 1986, but made an appearance at the 1991 World Professional Championships in Fairfax, Virginia.

== Eponymous skills ==
The Yurchenko vault is named after her in the Code of Points. The Yurchenko family is now a group of vaults based on the entry she used in her original Yurchenko vault (a round-off on to the spring board, followed by a flic-flac "back handspring" on to the table, with a backwards tucked salto off). The Yurchenko loop is another skill she originated, but it no longer appears in the Code of Points.

Apparatus	Name	Description	Difficulty (Note: Valid for the 2025-2028 Code of Points)
Vault	Yurchenko	Round-off flic-flac on - tucked salto backward off	3.0

== Post-competitive career ==
Yurchenko coached at LVSA, a gymnastics club in Pennsylvania, for almost nine years, at Parkettes National Gymnastics Training Center in Allentown, Pennsylvania, and at the Lakeshore Academy of Artistic Gymnastics in Chicago. In June 2015, she opened her own gymnastics academy, C.I.T.Y. Club Gymnastics Academy, in Chicago's South Loop.

== Achievements ==
Year	Event	AA	Team	VT	UB	BB	FX
1982	World Cup	1st		1st	2nd	1st	
1982	USSR Cup	1st			1st		
1982	USSR Championships	1st		1st	1st		1st
1983
1983	World Championships	1st	1st				
1983	USSR Championships	1st		1st	1st	1st	2nd
1984	Friendship Games		1st	1st	2nd		
1985
1985	World Championships	—N/a	1st				
1985	USSR Championships	3rd					

== External links and sources ==
- Natalia Yurchenko Official Site
- Yurchenko Gymnastics Official Site
- C.I.T.Y. Club Gymnastics Academy Official Site
- Natalia YURTCHENKO at World Gymnastics
- Natalia Yurchenko at the International Gymnastics Hall of Fame
- Natalia Yurchenko at Gymn Forum
- Whatever happened to Natalia Yurchenko?
- Video of Natalia Yurchenko performing Yurchenko vault - 1985 Summer Universiade in Kobe, all-around

This article contains information from the website http://www.gymnast.ru/, incorporated into the Wikipedia with permission from its author E. V. Avsenev.
