= 1982 FIG Artistic Gymnastics World Cup =

International gymnastics competition

The 1982 Artistic Gymnastics World Cup was held in Zagreb, SFR Yugoslavia in 1982.

== Medal winners ==
Event	Gold	Silver	Bronze	Ref.
Men's individual all-around	(China) Li Ning	(China) Tong Fei	(Soviet Union) Yuri Korolev	
Women's individual all-around	(Soviet Union) Natalia Yurchenko (Soviet Union) Olga Bicherova	None awarded	(Romania) Lavinia Agache	
Men's floor exercise	(China) Li Ning	(Soviet Union) Yuri Korolev	(China) Tong Fei (Japan) Nobuyuki Kajitani	
Men's pommel horse	(China) Li Ning	(Soviet Union) Yuri Korolev	(Soviet Union) Bogdan Makuts	
Men's still rings	(China) Li Ning	(Soviet Union) Yuri Korolev	(China) Tong Fei	
Men's vault	(China) Li Ning	(Japan) Koji Gushiken	(Soviet Union) Yuri Korolev (China) Tong Fei	
Men's parallel bars	(Soviet Union) Yuri Korolev	(Japan) Koji Gushiken	(China) Li Ning (Japan) Nobuyuki Kajitani	
Men's horizontal bar	(China) Tong Fei (China) Li Ning	None awarded	(United States) Peter Vidmar	
Women's vault	(Soviet Union) Natalia Yurchenko (Soviet Union) Olga Bicherova	None awarded	(United States) Julianne McNamara	
Women's uneven bars	(East Germany) Maxi Gnauck	(Soviet Union) Natalia Yurchenko (Soviet Union) Olga Bicherova	None awarded	
Women's balance beam	(Soviet Union) Natalia Yurchenko	(China) Wu Jiani	(Soviet Union) Olga Bicherova	
Women's floor exercise	(Soviet Union) Olga Bicherova	(Romania) Lavinia Agache	(East Germany) Maxi Gnauck	
