= Boriana Stoyanova =

Bulgarian artistic gymnast (born 1969)

- Full name: Boriana Stoyanova
- Born: 3 November 1969 (age 56)

Gymnastics career
- Discipline: Women's artistic gymnastics
- Country represented: Bulgaria
Medal record
Representing Bulgaria
World Championships
Gold medal – first place	1983 Budapest	Vault
Bronze medal – third place	1983 Budapest	Floor Exercise
European Championships
Bronze medal – third place	1983 Goteborg	Floor exercise
Bronze medal – third place	1983 Goteborg	Vault

Boriana Stoyanova (Bulgarian: Боряна Стоянова, born 3 November 1969) is a Bulgarian retired artistic gymnast. She was the 1983 World Champion on the vault, making her the first Bulgarian woman to win a World title, and represented Bulgaria at the 1984 Friendship Games (Oloumouc) and the 1988 Olympics in Seoul.

== Personal life ==
Stoyanova was born in Sofia. In 1990, she married a fellow gymnastics coach, Georgi Kazakov, and had a son also named Georgi. They divorced in 1995. Stoyanova said that she didn't want her son to compete in gymnastics due to "difficulties in this sport".

== Career ==
In 1982, Stoyanova competed at the Moscow News Prize tournament, where she won the all-around silver medal and gold on the balance beam. She was the first non-Soviet gymnast to win an all-around medal at the tournament, and she and Ri-chol Hon were awarded prizes for best performances by foreign gymnasts.

In 1983, Stoyanova competed at the European Championships, where she won a bronze on floor and tied for bronze on vault with Lavinia Agache. Later in the year, at the World Championships, she placed fourth in the all-around. She won bronze in the floor exercise and gold in the vault final; this was the first time a Bulgarian woman had won a title at the World Championships. Stoyanova, at only 13 years old, was too young to compete at the Championships; under the age requirements at the time, gymnasts had to be at least 14 at the beginning of the year. Her age was falsified to give her the birth date of 3 July, 1968 for competition.

In 1984, due to the 1984 Summer Olympics boycott, Stoyanova competed at the alternative Friendship Games. The Bulgarian women's team placed fourth in the team event. Stoyanova was 7th in the all-around and reached three of the event finals, only missing the balance beam final.

In 1985, Stoyanova competed at the 1985 World Championships, where she finished 11th in the all-around. In the vault final, she was 5th. The next year, at the 1986 World Cup, she placed 6th in the all-around and reached every event final.

She competed at the 1987 European Championships, where she placed 6th in the all-around and reached three event finals, with her best result being 4th on floor. Later that year, she was 10th in the all-around at the 1987 World Championships and again finished the vault final in 5th place.

Her last competition was the 1988 Summer Olympics, where she finished in 13th place in the all-around and fourth in the vault final. After the Olympics, Stoyanova began to coach at the CSKA club, although she stopped by 2002. She attended the opening of the 2019 Bulgarian championships, where she and other gymnasts such as Stoyan Deltchev were recognized for their achievements.

== Competitive history ==
Year	Event	Team	AA	VT	UB	BB	FX
Junior
1981	Junior Balkan Championships		9		2nd place, silver medalist(s)	6	
Senior
1982	ITA-BUL-AUT Tri-Meet	1st place, gold medalist(s)	2nd place, silver medalist(s)				
1982	Junior European Championships		2nd place, silver medalist(s)	2nd place, silver medalist(s)	4	8	4
1982	Moscow News		2nd place, silver medalist(s)	2nd place, silver medalist(s)		1st place, gold medalist(s)	
1982	Riga International			1st place, gold medalist(s)			
1983	Champions All		2nd place, silver medalist(s)				
1983	Chunichi Cup		8				
1983	European Championships		10	3rd place, bronze medalist(s)			3rd place, bronze medalist(s)
1983	GBR-BUL Dual Meet	1st place, gold medalist(s)	3rd place, bronze medalist(s)				
1983	Pre-Olympics		3rd place, bronze medalist(s)	3rd place, bronze medalist(s)	5	3rd place, bronze medalist(s)	2nd place, silver medalist(s)
1983	Tokyo Cup					3rd place, bronze medalist(s)	
1983	World Championships	4	4	1st place, gold medalist(s)			3rd place, bronze medalist(s)
1984	Champions All		1st place, gold medalist(s)				
1984	Friendship Games		7	8	7		4
1985	Balkan Championships		9	4			
1985	Chunichi Cup			6	7	5	6
1985	Tokyo Cup			4		5	
1985	World Championships	4	11	5			
1986	Ahoy Cup		7	6	6		
1986	McDonald's American Cup		2nd place, silver medalist(s)				
1986	Blume Memorial		6				
1986	Bulgarian Championships			1st place, gold medalist(s)		1st place, gold medalist(s)	1st place, gold medalist(s)
1986	FRG-BUL Dual Meet	1st place, gold medalist(s)	1st place, gold medalist(s)				
1986	International Mixed Pairs	8					
1986	Kraft International		2nd place, silver medalist(s)		3rd place, bronze medalist(s)		
1986	NED-BUL Dual Meet	1st place, gold medalist(s)	1st place, gold medalist(s)				
1986	World Cup Final		6	6	8	6	5
1987	Athens International		2nd place, silver medalist(s)	1st place, gold medalist(s)	2nd place, silver medalist(s)		1st place, gold medalist(s)
1987	Belgian Gym Masters		12	2nd place, silver medalist(s)	3rd place, bronze medalist(s)	3rd place, bronze medalist(s)	
1987	Blume Memorial					1st place, gold medalist(s)	
1987	Champions All		3rd place, bronze medalist(s)				
1987	European Championships		6		6		4
1987	Golden Sands International		1st place, gold medalist(s)	1st place, gold medalist(s)	1st place, gold medalist(s)		1st place, gold medalist(s)
1987	Joachim Blume Memorial		2nd place, silver medalist(s)				
1987	Medico Cup		1st place, gold medalist(s)	1st place, gold medalist(s)	1st place, gold medalist(s)	1st place, gold medalist(s)	2nd place, silver medalist(s)
1987	World Championships	5	10	5			
1988	Champions All		2nd place, silver medalist(s)				
1988	European Cup		2nd place, silver medalist(s)	1st place, gold medalist(s)	4	2nd place, silver medalist(s)	2nd place, silver medalist(s)
1988	Golden Sands International		2nd place, silver medalist(s)				
1988	Olympic Games	5	13	4			
