= Bettina Schieferdecker =

East German artistic gymnast

Olympic medal record

Women's gymnastics

Representing East Germany
Bronze medal – third place	1988 Seoul	Team

Bettina Mochalski-Schieferdecker (born 30 April 1968 in Markranstädt) is a German former gymnast who competed in the 1988 Summer Olympics, where she won a bronze medal with the East German team in the team all-around. After retiring from gymnastics that same year, she became a medical doctor.
