= Alexander Pogorelov (gymnast) =

Retired Soviet/Russian gymnast

Gymnastics career
- Discipline: Men's artistic gymnastics
- Country represented: Soviet Union
Medal record
Men's Gymnastics
Representing the Soviet Union
World Championships
| Silver medal – second place | 1983 Budapest | Team |
| Silver medal – second place | 1983 Budapest | Horizontal Bar |

Alexander Pogorelov is a retired Soviet/Russian gymnast. He competed at the 1983 World Championships in Budapest and won a silver medal in horizontal bars, which he shared with Philippe Vatuone in a tie, and a silver medal from the team competition.
