= Erika Csányi =

Hungarian gymnast

Personal information
- Nationality: Hungarian
- Born: 22 May 1965 (age 59); Budapest, Hungary

Sport
- Sport: Gymnastics

Erika Csányi (born 22 May 1965) is a Hungarian gymnast. She competed in six events at the 1980 Summer Olympics.
