= Natalia Ilienko =

Soviet artistic gymnast (born 1967)

- Full name: Natalia Ilienko
- Born: 26 March 1967 (age 59)

Gymnastics career
- Discipline: Women's artistic gymnastics
- Country represented: Soviet Union
- Club: Dinamo Moscow
- Music: 1981: La Cenerentola Sinfonia
- Retired: 1984
Medal record
Representing Soviet Union
World Championships
Gold medal – first place	1981 Moscow	Team
Gold medal – first place	1981 Moscow	Floor Exercise
Gold medal – first place	1983 Budapest	Team
European Championships
Silver medal – second place	1981 Madrid	Balance Beam
Friendship Games
Gold medal – first place	1984 Olomouc	Team

Natalia Ilienko (born 26 March 1967 in Alma Ata, Kazakh SSR ) is a Soviet gymnast. Her biggest accomplishment was becoming world floor champion in 1981. She was praised for her highly expressive and fluid performances.

Ilienko competed at the 1980 Junior European Championships, finishing 6th all around, and the 1981 European Championships, finishing 4th all around, before being selected for the world championships team in 1981. Although she only finished 10th all around at the Soviet Championships, her first and second-place finishes on beam at the Soviet and European Championships allowed her to make the team. She qualified 6th to the all around finals, but was not allowed to compete because five of her teammates had qualified ahead of her.

Ilienko was selected for both the 1983 World Championships team and the 1984 Olympic Team. When the Soviet Union boycotted the 1984 Olympics, she competed at the alternate games Friendship Games in Olomouc. Her performances in the team competition left her out of the all around as the fourth Soviet gymnast.

Since retiring in 1984, Ilienko immigrated to the UK in 1992. She took up Aerobic Gymnastics and began competing in 1997, where she was twice British Senior Champion in 1997 and 1998. She coaches artistic and aerobic gymnastics at Heathrow Gymnastics Club, and has contributed to coaching the likes of 2008 Olympian, Becky Wing, European medalist, Nicole Hibbert and 2020 Olympian, Danusia Francis. She is married to husband, Gary, and they both have a son, Maxim.
