= Olga Mostepanova =

Former Soviet gymnast (born 1970)

- Full name: Olga Vasilyevna Mostepanova
- Born: 3 January 1969 (age 57) (disputed) Moscow, Soviet Union

Gymnastics career
- Discipline: Women's artistic gymnastics
- Country represented: Soviet Union (1980–85 (URS))
- Club: Dinamo Moscow
- Former coaches: Anna Anikina, Vladimir Aksyonov
Medal record
Representing Soviet Union
World Championships
Gold medal – first place	1983 Budapest	Team
Gold medal – first place	1983 Budapest	Balance Beam
Gold medal – first place	1985 Montreal	Team
Silver medal – second place	1983 Budapest	All-Around
Silver medal – second place	1983 Budapest	Floor Exercise
Friendship Games
Gold medal – first place	1984 Olomouc	Team
Gold medal – first place	1984 Olomouc	All-Around
Gold medal – first place	1984 Olomouc	Balance Beam
Gold medal – first place	1984 Olomouc	Floor Exercise
Gold medal – first place	1984 Olomouc	Vault

Olga Vasilyevna Mostepanova (Russian: Ольга Васильевна Мостепанова; born 3 January 1969) is a retired former Soviet gymnast. She won three gold medals at the World Championships.

== Personal life ==
Mostepanova's birth year has been variously reported as 1968 or 1969. She herself stated that she was born on 3 January 1969 in Moscow.

She is married and the mother of five children.

== Gymnastics career ==
A native of Moscow, Mostepanova began gymnastics at the age of 5 when her mother took her to the Dinamo club for a tryout. She remained at Dinamo, where she trained under coach Anna Anikina and later Vladimir Aksyonov. At the age of 10 she placed 7th all-around at the USSR Junior Championships and was named to the Soviet junior national team.

Over the next few years Mostepanova would become known as one of the promising gymnasts of the Soviet team. She enjoyed success in various junior international events, including the 1980 Champions All meet and the 1982 Junior European Championships, where she won the balance beam title, placed second on the vault and third in the all-around. She had a strong senior debut in 1983, winning two gold medals (team, balance beam) and two silvers (all-around, floor exercise) at the 1983 World Championships.

Mostepanova was considered an excellent medal prospect for the 1984 Olympics; however, due to the Eastern Bloc boycott, she did not compete in the Games. She led the Soviet team at the Friendship Games (also known as Olomouc, after the city in which the gymnastics competition was held; or the Alternate Games), the "alternative Olympics" for countries that had participated in the boycott. Olomouc was an exceptional competition for Mostepanova. In the all-around, she became the only gymnast in history to earn 10.0 scores on all four events in a major international competition, finishing the session with a perfect mark of 40.0. She nearly achieved this feat in both the qualifying round and the team finals as well, earning 10.0s on three of her four events. In total, Mostepanova earned twelve 10s in Olomouc and left with five of the six possible gold medals: team, all-around, vault, balance beam and floor exercise.

After the Friendship Games, she continued to compete, sharing in the team gold medal at the 1985 World Championships. She qualified for the all-around, but she and teammate Irina Baraksanova were pulled from the competition by the team coaches and replaced by Oksana Omelianchik and Elena Shushunova. This would be her last major meet for the USSR.

== Eponymous skill ==
Mostepanova has one eponymous skill listed in the Code of Points.

Apparatus	Name	Description	Difficulty (Note: Valid for the 2025–2028 Code of Points)
Floor exercise	Mostepanova	Handspring forward with 1/1 turn (360°) after hand support or before	C (0.3)

== Competition History ==
Year	Event	Team	AA	VT	UB	BB	FX
1979	Junior Friendship Tournament	1st place, gold medalist(s)	5				
1979	Junior USSR-ITA Dual Meet	1st place, gold medalist(s)	4				
1980	Champions All		3rd place, bronze medalist(s)				
1980	Coca Cola International		4			3rd place, bronze medalist(s)	1st place, gold medalist(s)
1980	Junior USSR Championships		4			3rd place, bronze medalist(s)	
1980	Junior USSR Cup		2nd place, silver medalist(s)			1st place, gold medalist(s)	
1981	All-Union Championships of Specialized Sports Schools		1st place, gold medalist(s)				
1981	Druzhba	1st place, gold medalist(s)	3rd place, bronze medalist(s)	1st place, gold medalist(s)	1st place, gold medalist(s)		4
1981	Junior GDR-USSR Dual Meet		2nd place, silver medalist(s)				
1981	Schoolchildren's Spartakiade	1st place, gold medalist(s)	5		5		5
1982	Junior European Championships		3rd place, bronze medalist(s)	2nd place, silver medalist(s)	7	1st place, gold medalist(s)	
1982	Riga International		1st place, gold medalist(s)				
1982	USA-USSR Dual Meet	1st place, gold medalist(s)	4				
1982	USSR Championships		3rd place, bronze medalist(s)	3rd place, bronze medalist(s)	2nd place, silver medalist(s)	3rd place, bronze medalist(s)	2nd place, silver medalist(s)
1982	USSR Cup		3rd place, bronze medalist(s)		3rd place, bronze medalist(s)	2nd place, silver medalist(s)	
1983	Moscow News		3rd place, bronze medalist(s)			3rd place, bronze medalist(s)	
1983	Moscow Spartakiade		1st place, gold medalist(s)	1st place, gold medalist(s)		1st place, gold medalist(s)	
1983	USA-USSR Dual Meet	1st place, gold medalist(s)	2nd place, silver medalist(s)				
1983	USSR Championships		8		2nd place, silver medalist(s)		
1983	USSR Cup		2nd place, silver medalist(s)	7	1st place, gold medalist(s)	1st place, gold medalist(s)	
1983	World Championships	1st place, gold medalist(s)	2nd place, silver medalist(s)			1st place, gold medalist(s)	2nd place, silver medalist(s)
1984	Friendship Games	1st place, gold medalist(s)	1st place, gold medalist(s)	1st place, gold medalist(s)		1st place, gold medalist(s)	1st place, gold medalist(s)
1984	USSR Championships		2nd place, silver medalist(s)	1st place, gold medalist(s)	3rd place, bronze medalist(s)	1st place, gold medalist(s)	
1984	USSR Cup		1st place, gold medalist(s)				
1985	USSR Championships			6			7
1985	USSR Cup		8				
1985	World Championships		1st place, gold medalist(s)				
