= Gymnastics at the 1988 Summer Olympics – Women's artistic team all-around =

Women's artistic team all-around at the Games of the XXIV Olympiad

Medalists
1st place, gold medalist(s)		Svetlana Baitova, Svetlana Boginskaya, Natalia Laschenova, Elena Shevchenko, Elena Shushunova, and Olga Strazheva	Soviet Union
2nd place, silver medalist(s)		Aurelia Dobre, Eugenia Golea, Celestina Popa, Gabriela Potorac, Daniela Silivaș, and Camelia Voinea	Romania
3rd place, bronze medalist(s)		Gabriele Fähnrich, Martina Jentsch, Dagmar Kersten, Ulrike Klotz, Bettina Schieferdecker, and Dörte Thümmler	East Germany

These are the results of the women's team all-around competition, one of six events for female competitors in artistic gymnastics at the 1988 Summer Olympics in Seoul. The compulsory and optional rounds took place on September 19 and 21 at the Olympic Gymnastics Hall.

== Results ==
The final score for each team was determined by combining all of the scores earned by the team on each apparatus during the compulsory and optional rounds. If all six gymnasts on a team performed a routine on a single apparatus during compulsories or optionals, only the five highest scores on that apparatus counted toward the team total.

The United States women's team was penalized five-tenths of a point from their team score by the Fédération Internationale de Gymnastique (FIG) after the compulsory round. East German judge Ellen Berger noticed that Rhonda Faehn, who was the American team alternate and not competing, had been standing on the uneven bars podium for the duration of Kelly Garrison-Steve's compulsory uneven bars routine. Although Faehn was not a coach, Berger assessed the penalty under a rule prohibiting coaches from remaining on the podium while an athlete competes. The deduction caused the United States to fall to fourth place with a combined score of 390.575, three-tenths of a point behind East Germany. This incident remains controversial in the sport of gymnastics, as the United States outperformed the East German team and would have taken the bronze medal in the team competition had they not been penalized.

Rank	Team	Vault			Uneven Bars			Balance Beam			Floor			Total	Rank
Rank	Team	C	O	Rank	C	O	Rank	C	O	Rank	C	O	Rank	Total	Rank
1	Soviet Union	99.150		1	98.925		1	98.750		1	98.650		1	395.475	
1	Yelena Shushunova	10.000	10.000	1	9.925	10.000	3	9.900	9.950	3	9.900	10.000	1	79.675	1
1	Svetlana Boginskaya	9.900	9.975	2	9.900	9.900	6	9.900	9.975	1	9.900	9.925	4	79.375	3
1	Natalia Laschenova	9.900	9.900	4	9.800	9.875	9	9.750	9.875	9	9.900	9.900	5	78.900	5
1	Svetlana Baitova	9.800	9.825	14	9.800	9.875	9	9.800	9.900	7	9.700	9.725	31	78.425	13
1	Elena Shevchenko	9.800	9.900	9	9.675	9.800	28	9.750	9.800	14	9.775	9.850	17	78.350	14
1	Olga Strazheva	9.875	9.900	6	9.900	9.925	5	9.900	8.900	66	9.775	0.000	85	68.175	85
Silver medal	Romania	98.525		2	98.350		3	98.725		2	98.525		2	394.125	
Silver medal	Daniela Silivaș	9.900	9.900	4	10.000	10.000	1	9.875	10.000	1	10.000	9.900	1	79.575	2
Silver medal	Gabriela Potorac	9.800	9.975	6	9.775	9.900	9	9.875	9.900	4	9.800	9.900	12	78.925	4
Silver medal	Aurelia Dobre	9.625	9.950	22	9.825	9.900	7	9.875	9.900	4	9.900	9.700	20	78.675	6
Silver medal	Celestina Popa	9.800	9.875	10	9.725	9.825	19	9.800	9.900	7	9.850	9.800	16	78.575	10
Silver medal	Eugenia Golea	9.700	9.900	17	9.525	9.725	51	9.750	9.850	11	9.725	9.700	31	77.875	18
Silver medal	Camelia Voinea	9.700	9.900	17	9.675	9.275	67	9.750	9.800	14	9.800	9.875	14	77.775	22
Bronze medal	East Germany	97.775		4	98.525		2	96.600		5	97.975		5	390.875	
Bronze medal	Dagmar Kersten	9.800	9.950	8	10.000	9.975	2	9.800	9.400	34	9.900	9.825	10	78.650	8
Bronze medal	Dörte Thümmler	9.700	9.900	17	9.950	9.950	4	9.800	9.400	34	9.900	9.950	3	78.550	11
Bronze medal	Ulrike Klotz	9.650	9.800	27	9.800	9.800	16	9.750	9.850	11	9.775	9.850	17	78.275	16
Bronze medal	Gabriele Fähnrich	9.600	9.725	38	9.750	9.875	15	9.675	9.750	22	9.625	9.625	45	77.625	25
Bronze medal	Bettina Schieferdecker	9.775	9.875	12	9.375	9.725	60	9.675	9.500	40	9.800	9.725	24	77.450	30
Bronze medal	Martina Jentsch	9.500	0.000	87	9.700	0.000	87	9.500	0.000	86	9.550	0.000	97	38.250	87
4	United States	97.625		5	97.350		5	97.550		3	98.050		4	390.575	
4	Phoebe Mills	9.650	9.800	27	9.750	9.925	9	9.850	9.900	6	9.900	9.900	5	78.675	6
4	Brandy Johnson	9.850	9.800	12	9.775	9.900	9	9.725	9.800	17	9.875	9.825	12	78.550	11
4	Kelly Garrison-Steves	9.700	9.750	27	9.700	9.750	32	9.775	9.800	13	9.800	9.550	39	77.825	21
4	Hope Spivey	9.725	9.850	22	9.650	9.275	68	9.675	9.675	25	9.800	9.800	20	77.450	30
4	Chelle Stack	9.675	9.825	25	9.225	9.875	60	9.625	9.675	27	9.700	9.800	27	77.400	32
4	Missy Marlowe	9.600	9.750	35	9.750	9.775	24	8.975	9.725	73	9.625	9.650	44	76.850	46
5	Bulgaria	98.200		3	97.125		7	97.125		4	98.100		3	390.550	
5	Diana Dudeva	9.825	9.800	14	9.750	9.850	16	9.725	9.900	9	9.900	9.900	5	78.650	8
5	Delyana Vodenicharova	9.800	9.800	17	9.700	9.800	27	9.650	9.825	20	9.850	9.900	8	78.325	15
5	Boryana Stoyanova	9.850	9.975	3	9.475	9.825	47	9.700	9.825	17	9.875	9.425	42	77.950	17
5	Ivelina Raykova	9.750	9.800	24	9.600	9.800	36	9.600	9.725	26	9.700	9.875	22	77.850	20
5	Mariya Kartalova	9.625	9.725	35	9.550	9.700	51	9.475	9.675	41	9.750	9.750	27	77.250	35
5	Khrabrina Khrabrova	9.750	9.850	17	9.550	8.925	83	9.500	9.225	71	9.625	9.600	47	76.025	62
6	China	97.175		6	97.275		6	96.575		6	97.375		6	388.400	
6	Chen Cuiting	9.525	9.900	32	9.600	9.825	34	9.675	9.625	27	9.825	9.900	10	77.875	18
6	Fan Di	9.450	9.775	47	9.750	9.900	14	9.675	9.575	30	9.525	9.825	39	77.475	28
6	Wang Wenjing	9.425	9.625	61	9.750	9.825	18	9.725	9.675	23	9.675	9.700	36	77.400	32
6	Wang Huiying	9.650	9.800	27	9.650	9.150	75	9.825	9.725	14	9.750	9.800	23	77.350	34
6	Ma Ying	9.500	9.900	33	9.675	9.650	44	9.500	9.575	47	9.525	9.700	47	77.025	41
6	Wang Xiaoyan	9.775	9.900	10	9.250	9.650	70	9.500	9.475	55	9.650	9.725	36	76.925	44
7	Czechoslovakia	95.525		11	97.625		4	96.375		7	96.625		8	386.150	
7	Iveta Poloková	9.625	9.700	38	9.825	9.900	7	9.850	9.075	59	9.850	9.825	14	77.650	23
7	Hana Říčná	9.350	9.450	78	9.750	9.800	19	9.800	9.725	17	9.625	9.675	42	77.175	38
7	Alena Dřevjaná	9.475	9.600	56	9.700	9.725	34	9.725	9.675	23	9.575	9.500	52	76.975	43
7	Ivona Krmelová	9.500	9.625	50	9.750	9.800	19	9.450	9.200	75	9.675	9.725	34	76.725	49
7	Martina Velíšková	9.400	9.500	72	9.700	9.675	38	9.600	9.600	34	9.625	9.500	51	76.600	52
7	Jana Vejrková	9.450	9.650	52	9.575	9.225	75	9.575	9.625	34	9.525	9.550	52	76.175	58
8	Hungary	96.875		7	96.550		10	95.550		9	96.650		7	385.625	
8	Eszter Óváry	9.750	9.875	14	9.625	9.650	49	9.500	9.600	44	9.675	9.825	27	77.500	26
8	Beáta Storczer	9.750	9.700	27	9.200	9.550	77	9.650	9.650	27	9.850	9.900	8	77.250	35
8	Andrea Ladányi	9.650	9.700	35	9.750	9.800	19	9.750	9.275	49	9.750	9.575	41	77.250	35
8	Zsuzsa Csisztu	9.625	9.700	38	9.625	9.775	36	9.525	9.575	44	9.600	9.350	67	76.665	47
8	Zsuzsanna Miskó	9.475	9.650	50	9.550	9.625	55	9.550	9.475	49	9.475	9.475	67	76.275	56
8	Ágnes Miskó	9.450	0.000	88	9.600	0.000	88	9.450	0.000	87	9.650	0.000	86	38.150	88
9	Spain	95.975		9	97.025		8	94.675		12	96.300		9	383.975	
9	Laura Muñoz	9.525	9.775	41	9.700	9.825	24	9.600	9.600	34	9.800	9.825	17	77.650	23
9	Eva Rueda	9.675	9.800	26	9.700	9.775	28	9.550	9.450	54	9.700	9.825	24	77.475	28
9	Manuela Hervás	9.300	9.600	72	9.625	9.700	44	9.425	9.400	64	9.500	9.500	61	76.050	61
9	Lidia Castillejo	9.500	9.575	56	9.675	9.675	41	9.475	9.400	60	9.400	9.225	81	75.925	64
9	Nuria García	9.425	9.550	68	9.675	9.675	41	9.475	8.875	81	9.550	9.625	50	75.850	68
9	Nuria Belchi	9.400	9.700	52	9.500	9.575	62	9.300	9.300	76	9.300	9.575	71	75.650	70
10	South Korea	95.775		10	96.325		11	95.850		8	95.875		11	383.825	
10	Park Ji-Sook	9.675	9.600	43	9.725	9.750	28	9.650	9.600	30	9.775	9.725	27	77.500	26
10	Han Kyung-Im	9.425	9.600	64	9.725	9.800	24	9.750	9.725	20	9.525	9.550	52	77.100	40
10	Bae Eun-Mi	9.600	9.550	48	9.650	9.725	38	9.525	9.575	44	9.600	9.275	71	76.500	53
10	Lim Hye-Jin	9.500	9.550	61	9.650	9.175	74	9.625	9.625	30	9.700	9.325	60	76.150	59
10	Kim Nam-Ok	9.650	9.625	43	9.525	9.600	59	9.375	9.125	79	9.575	9.675	45	76.150	59
10	Kim Eun-Mi	9.425	9.450	74	9.325	8.500	86	9.650	7.800	84	9.675	9.125	78	72.950	84
11	Canada	96.075		8	96.650		9	94.825		11	96.200		10	383.750	
11	Lori Strong	9.600	9.800	33	9.650	9.900	19	9.600	9.550	41	9.700	9.375	52	77.175	38
11	Janine Rankin	9.600	9.675	43	9.675	9.800	28	9.525	9.325	63	9.700	9.725	31	77.025	41
11	Monica Covacci	9.500	9.800	41	9.125	9.750	72	9.650	9.475	43	9.700	9.700	34	76.700	50
11	Larissa Lowing	9.425	9.675	52	9.575	9.800	38	9.350	9.425	68	9.475	9.500	64	76.225	57
11	Cathy Giancaspro	9.300	9.700	66	9.200	9.650	73	9.500	8.900	80	9.600	9.600	49	75.450	74
11	Christina McDonald	8.675	9.650	85	9.650	9.600	51	9.150	9.425	77	9.425	9.500	70	75.075	78
12	Japan	94.500		12	95.825		12	94.850		10	95.025		12	380.200	
12	Miho Shinoda	9.350	9.675	64	9.550	9.750	47	9.575	9.675	30	9.325	9.550	71	76.450	54
12	Mieko Mori	9.400	9.375	79	9.475	9.700	55	9.500	9.475	55	9.575	9.475	57	75.975	63
12	Maiko Morio	9.250	9.425	82	9.550	9.650	54	9.525	9.500	49	9.550	9.425	64	75.875	66
12	Yuriko Nanahara	9.350	9.475	77	9.525	9.500	63	9.500	9.225	71	9.400	9.650	57	75.625	71
12	Sachiko Morimura	9.375	9.500	74	9.325	9.650	65	9.450	9.425	60	9.275	9.575	76	75.575	72
12	Makiko Sanada	9.425	9.525	69	9.350	9.625	65	9.450	8.700	82	9.500	9.250	79	74.825	80
	Giulia Volpi (ITA)	9.600	9.675	43	9.575	9.775	41	9.725	9.050	68	9.775	9.750	24	76.925	44
	Karine Boucher (FRA)	9.525	9.550	56	9.525	9.750	49	9.550	9.500	48	9.775	9.600	36	76.775	47
	Luisa Parente (BRA)	9.525	9.550	56	9.675	9.650	44	9.600	9.600	34	9.550	9.500	57	76.650	51
	Patrizia Luconi (ITA)	9.450	9.625	56	9.700	9.750	32	9.500	9.450	58	9.500	9.475	64	76.450	54
	Monique Allen (AUS)	9.450	9.650	52	9.625	9.125	77	9.425	9.550	55	9.500	9.575	52	75.900	65
	Maria Cocuzza (ITA)	9.575	9.375	69	9.450	9.450	70	9.550	9.475	49	9.525	9.475	61	75.875	66
	Foteini Varvariotou (GRE)	9.250	9.700	69	9.475	9.700	55	9.275	9.425	73	9.425	9.450	71	75.700	69
	Catherine Romano (FRA)	9.300	9.425	80	9.575	9.450	63	9.300	9.575	60	9.525	9.350	71	75.500	73
	Leanne Rycroft (AUS)	9.275	9.450	80	9.500	9.675	55	9.275	9.475	70	9.375	9.325	80	75.350	75
	María Flores-Wurmser (GUA)	9.400	9.650	61	9.350	9.300	79	9.375	9.425	66	9.325	9.500	77	75.325	76
	Revital Sharon (ISR)	9.525	9.625	48	9.000	9.550	81	9.500	9.050	78	9.575	9.425	61	75.250	77
	Michaela Ustorf (FRG)	9.550	9.100	84	9.500	8.750	84	9.450	9.575	49	9.425	9.525	67	74.875	79
	Anne-Marie Bauduin (FRA)	9.275	9.400	82	9.425	9.100	82	9.600	9.225	64	9.700	8.775	83	74.500	81
	Karen Hargate (GBR)	9.400	9.600	66	9.425	9.500	68	9.175	8.750	83	9.275	9.275	82	74.400	82
	Sónia Moura (POR)	9.300	9.575	74	9.375	9.275	79	8.775	8.400	85	9.175	9.150	84	73.025	83
	Isabella von Lospichl (FRG)	9.550	8.675	86	9.700	8.300	85	9.375	0.000	88	9.450	0.000	88	55.050	86
	Karen Kennedy (GBR)	9.200	0.000	90	9.350	0.000	89	9.000	0.000	89	9.225	0.000	89	36.775	89
	Mauricette Geller (BEL)	9.225	0.000	89	8.750	0.000	90	8.825	0.000	90	8.975	0.000	90	35.775	90
	Birgit Schier (AUT)	did not start													
