= European Artistic Gymnastics Championships – Women's uneven bars =

Women's uneven bars

The uneven bars at the European Women's Artistic Gymnastics Championships were first held in 1957.

Three medals are awarded: gold for first place, silver for second place, and bronze for third place. Tie breakers have not been used in every year. In the event of a tie between two gymnasts, both names are listed, and the following position (second for a tie for first, third for a tie for second) is left empty because a medal was not awarded for that position. If three gymnastics tied for a position, the following two positions are left empty.

Svetlana Khorkina holds the record for most gold medals in this event, with six. Khorkina and Beth Tweddle, who won four golds, one silver, and one bronze, are tied for most total medals.

== Medalists ==
Year	Location	Gold	Silver	Bronze
1957	(Romania) Bucharest	(Soviet Union) Larisa Latynina	(Romania) Elena Leușteanu	(Czechoslovakia) Eva Bosáková
1959	(Poland) Kraków	(Soviet Union) Polina Astakhova	(Romania) Elena Leușteanu	(East Germany) Ingrid Föst
1961	(East Germany) Leipzig	(Soviet Union) Polina Astakhova	(Soviet Union) Larisa Latynina	(East Germany) Ingrid Föst
1963	(France) Paris	(Netherlands) Thea Belmer	(Socialist Federal Republic of Yugoslavia) Tereza Kočiš	(Sweden) Solveig Egman-Andersson
1965	(Bulgaria) Sofia	(Czechoslovakia) Věra Čáslavská	(Soviet Union) Larisa Latynina (Bulgaria) Mariya Karashka	None awarded
1967	(Netherlands) Amsterdam	(Czechoslovakia) Věra Čáslavská	(East Germany) Karin Büttner-Janz	(Czechoslovakia) Marianna Némethová-Krajčírová
1969	(Sweden) Landskrona	(East Germany) Karin Büttner-Janz	(Soviet Union) Olga Karasyova	(Soviet Union) Ludmilla Tourischeva
1971	(Soviet Union) Minsk	(Soviet Union) Tamara Lazakovich	(Soviet Union) Ludmilla Tourischeva	(East Germany) Angelika Hellmann
1973	(United Kingdom) London	(Soviet Union) Ludmilla Tourischeva	(East Germany) Angelika Hellmann	(Romania) Alina Goreac
1975	(Norway) Skien	(Romania) Nadia Comăneci	(East Germany) Annelore Zinke	(Soviet Union) Nellie Kim
1977	(Czechoslovakia) Prague	(Soviet Union) Elena Mukhina (Romania) Nadia Comăneci	None awarded	(East Germany) Steffi Kräker
1979	(Denmark) Copenhagen	(Soviet Union) Elena Mukhina	(Romania) Emilia Eberle	(East Germany) Maxi Gnauck
1981	(Spain) Madrid	(East Germany) Maxi Gnauck	(Romania) Cristina Grigoraș (Soviet Union) Alla Misnik	None awarded
1983	(Sweden) Gothenburg	(Romania) Ecaterina Szabo	(Romania) Lavinia Agache	(Czechoslovakia) Jana Labáková
1985	(Finland) Helsinki	(East Germany) Maxi Gnauck (Soviet Union) Yelena Shushunova	None awarded	(Soviet Union) Oksana Omelianchik
1987	(Soviet Union) Moscow	(Romania) Daniela Silivaș	(Bulgaria) Diana Dudeva	(East Germany) Dörte Thümmler
1989	(Belgium) Brussels	(Hungary) Henrietta Ónodi	(Romania) Daniela Silivaș (Soviet Union) Olga Strazheva	None awarded
1990	(Greece) Athens	(Soviet Union) Svetlana Boginskaya (Soviet Union) Natalia Kalinina (Romania) Mirela Pașca	None awarded	
1992	(France) Nantes	(Ukraine) Tatiana Gutsu	(Ukraine) Tatiana Lysenko	(Russia) Yelena Grudneva
1994	(Sweden) Stockholm	(Russia) Svetlana Khorkina	(Russia) Oksana Fabrichnova	(Spain) Mercedes Pacheco
1996	(United Kingdom) Birmingham	(Russia) Svetlana Khorkina (Ukraine) Lilia Podkopayeva (Romania) Simona Amânar	None awarded	
1998	(Russia) Saint Petersburg	(Russia) Svetlana Khorkina	(Ukraine) Viktoria Karpenko	(Romania) Claudia Presăcan
2000	(France) Paris	(Russia) Svetlana Khorkina	(Ukraine) Viktoria Karpenko	(Russia) Yelena Produnova
2002	(Greece) Patras	(Russia) Svetlana Khorkina	(Netherlands) Renske Endel	(United Kingdom) Beth Tweddle
2004	(Netherlands) Amsterdam	(Russia) Svetlana Khorkina	(United Kingdom) Beth Tweddle	(Ukraine) Iryna Krasnianska
2005	(Hungary) Debrecen	(France) Émilie Le Pennec	(Spain) Tania Gener	(Ukraine) Dariya Zgoba
2006	(Greece) Volos	(United Kingdom) Beth Tweddle	(Czech Republic) Jana Šikulová	(Spain) Lenika de Simone
2007	(Netherlands) Amsterdam	(Ukraine) Dariya Zgoba	(Romania) Steliana Nistor	(Russia) Ekaterina Kramarenko
2008	(France) Clermont-Ferrand	(Russia) Ksenia Semenova	(Romania) Steliana Nistor	(Ukraine) Dariya Zgoba
2009	(Italy) Milan	(United Kingdom) Beth Tweddle	(Russia) Ksenia Semyonova	(Germany) Anja Brinker
2010	(United Kingdom) Birmingham	(United Kingdom) Beth Tweddle	(Russia) Aliya Mustafina	(Ukraine) Natalia Kononenko
2011	(Germany) Berlin	(United Kingdom) Beth Tweddle	(Russia) Tatiana Nabieva	(Germany) Kim Bui
2012	(Belgium) Brussels	(Russia) Viktoria Komova	(Russia) Anastasia Grishina	(Ukraine) Natalia Kononenko
2013	(Russia) Moscow	(Russia) Aliya Mustafina	(Sweden) Jonna Adlerteg	(Russia) Maria Paseka
2014	(Bulgaria) Sofia	(United Kingdom) Becky Downie	(Russia) Aliya Mustafina	(Russia) Daria Spiridonova
2015	(France) Montpellier	(Russia) Daria Spiridonova	(United Kingdom) Becky Downie	(Netherlands) Sanne Wevers
2016	(Switzerland) Bern	(United Kingdom) Becky Downie	(Russia) Daria Spiridonova	(Russia) Aliya Mustafina
2017	(Romania) Cluj-Napoca	(Belgium) Nina Derwael	(Russia) Elena Eremina	(United Kingdom) Ellie Downie (Germany) Elisabeth Seitz
2018	(Scotland) Glasgow	(Belgium) Nina Derwael	(Sweden) Jonna Adlerteg	(Russia) Angelina Melnikova
2019	(Poland) Szczecin	(Russia) Anastasia Ilyankova	(Russia) Angelina Melnikova	(Italy) Alice D'Amato
2020	(Turkey) Mersin	(Hungary) Zsófia Kóvacs	(Hungary) Zója Székely	(Slovakia) Barbora Mokošová
2021	(Switzerland) Basel	(Russia) Angelina Melnikova	(Russia) Vladislava Urazova	(United Kingdom) Amelie Morgan
2022	(Germany) Munich	(Germany) Elisabeth Seitz	(Italy) Alice D'Amato	(France) Lorette Charpy
2023	(Turkey) Antalya	(Italy) Alice D'Amato	(United Kingdom) Becky Downie	(Germany) Elisabeth Seitz
2024	(Italy) Rimini	(Italy) Alice D'Amato	(Italy) Elisa Iorio	(United Kingdom) Georgia-Mae Fenton
2025	(Germany) Leipzig	(Belgium) Nina Derwael	(Hungary) Bettina Lili Czifra	(Romania) Ana Bărbosu
2026	(Croatia) Zagreb	(Germany) Helen Kevric	(Italy) Elisa Iorio	(Italy) Giulia Perotti

== Medal table ==
Rank	Nation	Gold	Silver	Bronze	Total
1	Russia (RUS)	12	10	7	29
2	Soviet Union (URS)	10	6	3	19
3	Romania (ROU)	6	8	3	17
4	Great Britain (GBR)	6	3	4	13
5	East Germany (GDR)	3	3	6	12
6	Ukraine (UKR)	3	3	5	11
7	Belgium (BEL)	3	0	0	3
8	Italy (ITA)	2	3	2	7
9	Hungary (HUN)	2	2	0	4
10	Germany (GER)	2	0	4	6
11	Czechoslovakia (TCH)	2	0	3	5
12	Netherlands (NED)	1	1	1	3
13	France (FRA)	1	0	1	2
14	Sweden (SWE)	0	2	1	3
15	Bulgaria (BUL)	0	2	0	2
16	Spain (ESP)	0	1	2	3
17	Czech Republic (CZE)	0	1	0	1
17	Yugoslavia (YUG)	0	1	0	1
19	Slovakia (SVK)	0	0	1	1
Totals (19 entries)		53	46	43	142
