= Gymnastics at the 1988 Summer Olympics – Women's artistic individual all-around =

Women's artistic individual all-around at the Games of the XXIV Olympiad
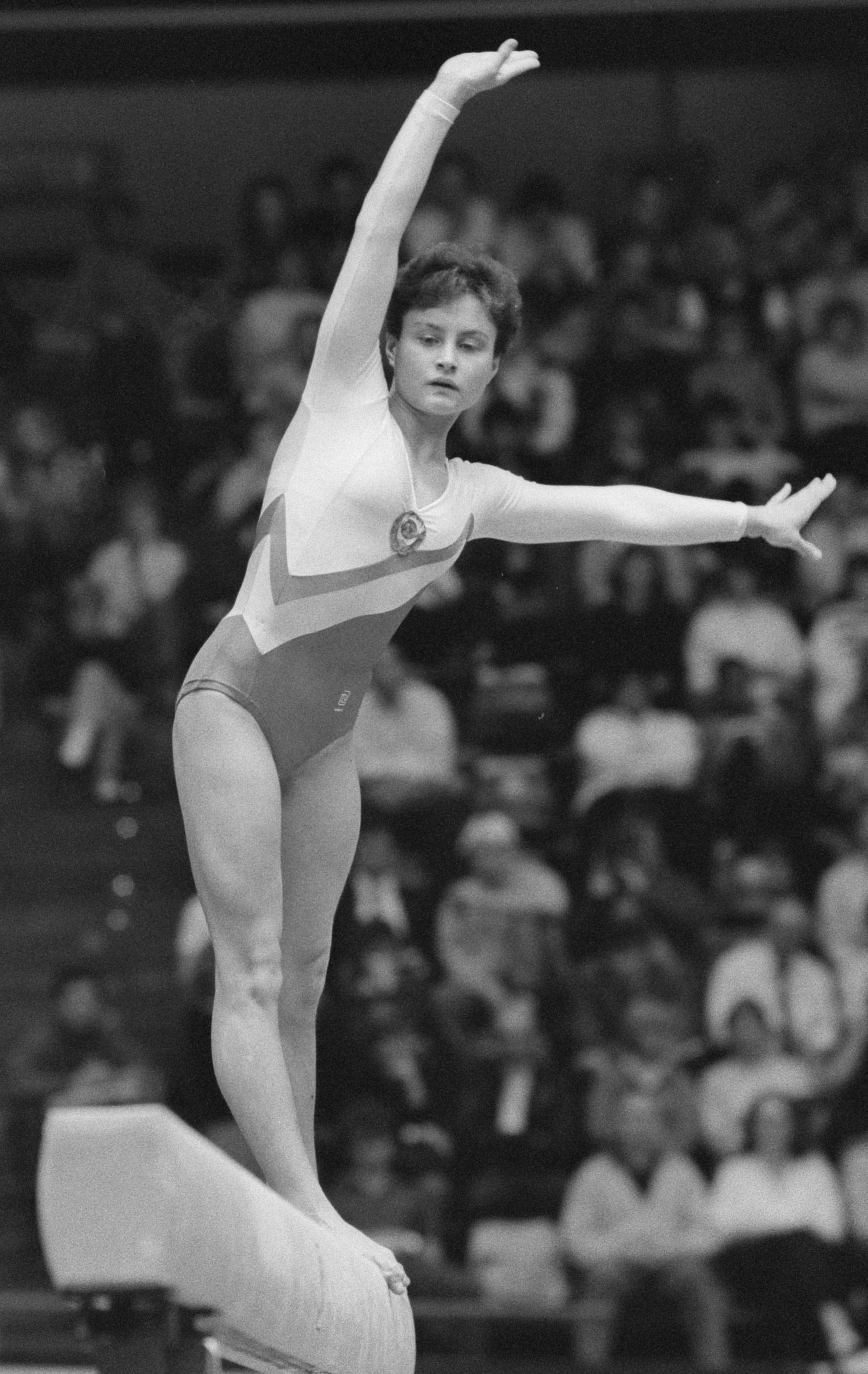
- Gold medalist Yelena Shushunova (1987)
- Competitors: 90 from 28 nations

Medalists
1st place, gold medalist(s)		Yelena Shushunova	Soviet Union
2nd place, silver medalist(s)		Daniela Silivaş	Romania
3rd place, bronze medalist(s)		Svetlana Boginskaya	Soviet Union

These are the results of the women's individual all-around competition, one of six events for female competitors in artistic gymnastics at the 1988 Summer Olympics in Seoul. The qualification and final rounds took place on September 19, 21 and 23rd at the Olympic Gymnastics Hall.

== Results ==
=== Qualification ===
Ninety gymnasts competed in the all-around during the compulsory and optional rounds on September 19 and 21. The thirty-six highest scoring gymnasts advanced to the final on September 23. Each country was limited to three competitors in the final. Half of the points earned by each gymnast during both the compulsory and optional rounds carried over to the final. This constitutes each gymnast's "prelim" score.

=== Final ===
Rank	Gymnast	Vault	Uneven Bars	Balance Beam	Floor	Prelim	Total
Gold medal	Yelena Shushunova (URS)	10.000	9.900	9.925	10.000	39.837	79.662
Silver medal	Daniela Silivaş (ROU)	9.950	10.000	9.900	10.000	39.787	79.637
Bronze medal	Svetlana Boginskaya (URS)	9.950	9.950	9.900	9.900	39.700	79.400
4	Gabriela Potorac (ROU)	9.800	9.900	9.950	9.925	39.462	79.037
5	Natalia Laschenova (URS)	9.825	9.825	9.875	9.900	39.450	78.875
6	Aurelia Dobre (ROU)	9.825	9.900	9.900	9.850	39.337	78.812
7	Dörte Thümmler (GDR)	9.900	9.975	9.725	9.925	39.275	78.800
8	Dagmar Kersten (GDR)	9.925	9.900	9.725	9.900	39.325	78.775
9	Diana Doudeva (BUL)	9.800	9.875	9.825	9.900	39.325	78.725
10	Brandy Johnson (USA)	9.825	9.875	9.825	9.725	39.275	78.525
11	Ulrike Klotz (GDR)	9.800	9.875	9.775	9.900	39.137	78.487
12	Delyana Vodenicharova (BUL)	9.700	9.800	9.775	9.900	39.162	78.337
13	Boriana Stoyanova (BUL)	9.775	9.875	9.725	9.850	38.975	78.200
14	Chen Cuiting (CHN)	9.825	9.775	9.700	9.900	38.937	78.137
15	Phoebe Mills (USA)	9.800	9.850	9.275	9.775	39.337	78.037
16	Kelly Garrison-Steves (USA)	9.825	9.750	9.675	9.775	38.912	77.937
17	Iveta Poloková (TCH)	9.700	9.825	9.700	9.800	38.825	77.850
18	Eva Rueda (ESP)	9.750	9.750	9.600	9.850	38.737	77.687
19	Eszter Óváry (HUN)	9.825	9.675	9.600	9.825	38.750	77.675
20	Fan Di (CHN)	9.675	9.900	9.725	9.600	38.737	77.637
21	Park Ji-suk (KOR)	9.700	9.700	9.600	9.850	38.750	77.600
22	Monica Covacci (CAN)	9.800	9.800	9.725	9.750	38.350	77.425
23	Laura Munoz (ESP)	9.875	9.750	9.150	9.800	38.825	77.400
23	Beáta Storczer (HUN)	9.725	9.600	9.650	9.800	38.625	77.400
25	Karine Boucher (FRA)	9.725	9.800	9.637	9.825	38.387	77.374
26	Alena Drevjana (TCH)	9.700	9.825	9.675	9.600	38.487	77.287
27	Andrea Ladányi (HUN)	9.675	9.825	9.150	9.700	38.625	76.975
28	Giulia Volpi (ITA)	9.775	9.800	9.125	9.800	38.462	76.962
29	Hana Ricna (TCH)	9.125	9.825	9.625	9.700	38.587	76.862
30	Han Gyeong-im (KOR)	9.725	9.700	9.725	9.150	38.550	76.850
31	Janine Rankin (CAN)	9.775	9.675	9.125	9.700	38.512	76.787
32	Wang Wenjing (CHN)	9.525	9.225	9.675	9.575	38.700	76.700
33	Bae Eun-mi (KOR)	9.625	9.775	9.625	9.275	38.250	76.550
34	Miho Shinoda (JPN)	9.750	9.625	9.125	9.750	38.225	76.475
35	Luísa Parente (BRA)	9.700	9.700	9.175	8.850	38.325	75.750
36	Lori Strong (CAN)	0.000	9.225	9.750	9.150	38.587	66.712
