= Elena Sazonenkova =

Soviet artistic gymnast

- Full name: Elena Vladimirovna Sazonenkova
- Born: 22 October 1973 (age 52) Riga, Latvian SSR, Soviet Union

Gymnastics career
- Discipline: Women's artistic gymnastics
- Country represented: Latvia
- Former countries represented: Soviet Union
- Club: Profsoyuz
- Head coach: Yuri Korozev
Medal record
Representing Soviet Union
World Championships
Gold medal – first place	1989 Stuttgart	Team
Summer Universiade
Gold medal – first place	1991 Sheffield	All-around
Silver medal – second place	1991 Sheffield	Floor exercise
Bronze medal – third place	1991 Sheffield	Team

Elena Vladimirovna Sazonenkova (Russian: Елена Владимировна Сазоненкова; born 22 October 1973) is a Soviet former artistic gymnast. She was a member of the team that won gold at the 1989 World Championships. She is the 1991 Summer Universiade all-around champion.

== Gymnastics career ==
Sazonenkova began gymnastics when she was six years old. She finished seventh in the all-around at the 1988 USSR Championships.

Sazonenkova helped the Soviet Union win a 1989 dual meet against the United States and finished second in the all-around to Brandy Johnson. She finished eighth in the all-around at the 1989 USSR Championships. Then at the USSR Cup, she won the silver medal in the all-around. She was selected to compete at the 1989 World Championships alongside Natalia Lashchenova, Olga Strazheva, Svetlana Boginskaya, Olesya Dudnik, and Svetlana Baitova, and the team won the gold medal. Individually, she finished sixth in the balance beam final with a score of 9.825.

Sazonenkova finished second in the all-around at the 1990 Centenary Cup after making a mistake on the floor exercise. She won the all-around title at the 1990 USSR Championships. At the 1991 Summer Universiade, she won a bronze medal with the Soviet team that finished behind North Korea and the United States. She won the individual all-around title and won a silver medal on the floor exercise behind teammate Natalia Lashchenova.

Sazonenkova was not eligible for the 1992 Summer Olympics due to Latvia's decision to compete as an independent nation, as the Olympic qualifiers had already taken place and she could not join the Unified Team. She competed for Latvia at the 1992 World Championships but did not advance beyond the qualification round. This was the final competition of her career.
