= 1989 European Women's Artistic Gymnastics Championships =

17th European Women's Artistic Gymnastics Championships
- Location: Brussels, Belgium
- Dates: 20–21 May 1989

The 17th European Women's Artistic Gymnastics Championships was held in Brussels, Belgium, on 20-21 May 1989.

== Medalists ==
Event	Gold	Silver	Bronze
Seniors
All-Around	Svetlana Boginskaya (URS)	Daniela Silivaș (ROM)	Olga Strazheva (URS)
Vault	Svetlana Boginskaya (URS)	Milena Mavrodieva (BUL)	Cristina Bontaș (ROM)
Uneven Bars	Henrietta Ónodi (HUN)	Daniela Silivaș (ROM); Olga Strazheva (URS)	none awarded
Balance Beam	Olesya Dudnik (URS); Gabriela Potorac (ROM)	none awarded	Daniela Silivaș (ROM)
Floor	Svetlana Boginskaya (URS); Daniela Silivaș (ROM)	none awarded	Cristina Bontaș (ROM); Henrietta Ónodi (HUN)

=== All-around ===
Rank	Gymnast	Vault (gymnastics)	Uneven bars	Balance beam	Floor (gymnastics)	Total
1st place, gold medalist(s)	Svetlana Boginskaya (URS)	9.937	9.950	9.975	10.000	39.862
2nd place, silver medalist(s)	Daniela Silivaș (ROM)	9.975	9.962	9.925	9.987	39.849
3rd place, bronze medalist(s)	Olga Strazheva (URS)	9.925	10.000	9.800	9.887	39.612
4	Gabriela Potorac (ROM)	9.987	9.887	9.862	9.862	39.598
5	Henrietta Ónodi (HUN)	9.925	9.912	9.875	9.837	39.549
6	Olesya Dudnik (URS)	9.812	9.875	9.875	9.875	39.437
7	Eva Rueda (ESP)	9.850	9.875	9.712	9.850	39.287
8	Antje Wilkenloh (GDR)	9.837	9.812	9.825	9.787	39.261
9	Cristina Bontaș (ROM)	9.900	9.825	9.662	9.862	39.249
10	Karine Boucher (FRA)	9.812	9.812	9.675	9.750	39.049
11	Alicia Fernández (ESP)	9.750	9.762	9.737	9.762	39.011
12	Karine Mermet (FRA)	9.925	9.762	9.300	9.812	38.799
13	Krisztina Kovács (HUN)	9.850	9.812	9.550	9.575	38.787
14	Daniela Bartova (TCH)	9.750	9.662	9.662	9.637	38.711
15	Beáta Storczer (HUN)	9.575	9.850	9.487	9.775	38.687
16	Gergana Peeva (BUL)	9.912	9.600	9.162	9.850	38.524
17	Sarah Mercer (GBR)	9.625	9.762	9.562	9.537	38.486
18	Bärbel Wielgoss (GDR)	9.825	9.750	9.225	9.600	38.400
19	Patricia Luconi (ITA)	9.812	9.712	9.487	9.275	38.286
20	Fofo Varvariotou (GRE)	9.725	9.525	9.512	9.500	38.262
21	Milena Mavrodieva (BUL)	9.937	9.100	9.175	9.887	38.099
22	Mauricette Geller (BEL)	9.612	9.550	9.200	9.575	37.937
23	Snejana Gileva (BUL)	9.837	9.212	9.150	9.675	37.874
24	Manuela Hervas (ESP)	9.575	9.562	9.200	9.150	37.487
25	Anne-Marie Bauduin (FRA)	9.212	9.387	9.562	9.325	37.486
26	Malgorzata Mroz (POL)	9.725	9.562	8.887	9.250	37.424
27	Monika Zabrzova (TCH)	9.687	9.575	9.812	8.325	37.399
27	Mireille Lemaire (FRG)	9.700	9.487	9.087	9.125	37.399
29	Annette Bleil (GDR)	9.650	9.575	9.150	8.987	37.362
30	Birgit Schier (AUT)	9.587	9.650	9.312	8.775	37.324

=== Vault Final ===
Rank	Gymnast	Total
1st place, gold medalist(s)	Svetlana Boginskaya (URS)	9.962
2nd place, silver medalist(s)	Milena Mavrodieva (BUL)	9.924
3rd place, bronze medalist(s)	Cristina Bontaș (ROM)	9.906
4	Daniela Silivaș (ROM)	9.893
5	Gergana Peeva (BUL)	9.881
6	Olga Strazheva (URS)	9.831
7	Karine Mermet (FRA)	9.768
8	Henrietta Ónodi (HUN)	9.668

=== Uneven bars ===
Rank	Gymnast	Total
1st place, gold medalist(s)	Henrietta Ónodi (HUN)	9.962
2nd place, silver medalist(s)	Daniela Silivaș (ROM)	9.950
2nd place, silver medalist(s)	Olga Strazheva (URS)	9.950
4	Gabriela Potorac (ROM)	9.912
4	Svetlana Boginskaya (URS)	9.912
6	Eva Rueda (ESP)	9.887
7	Antje Wilkenloh (GDR)	9.850
8	Beáta Storczer (HUN)	9.687

=== Balance beam ===
Rank	Gymnast	Total
1st place, gold medalist(s)	Olesya Dudnik (URS)	9.975
1st place, gold medalist(s)	Gabriela Potorac (ROM)	9.975
3rd place, bronze medalist(s)	Daniela Silivaș (ROM)	9.962
4	Svetlana Boginskaya (URS)	9.937
5	Henrietta Ónodi (HUN)	9.850
6	Monika Zabrzova (TCH)	9.750
7	Alicia Fernández (ESP)	9.737
8	Antje Wilkenloh (GDR)	8.762

=== Floor exercise ===
Rank	Gymnast	Total
1st place, gold medalist(s)	Daniela Silivaș (ROM)	10.000
1st place, gold medalist(s)	Svetlana Boginskaya (URS)	10.000
3rd place, bronze medalist(s)	Cristina Bontaș (ROM)	9.962
3rd place, bronze medalist(s)	Henrietta Ónodi (HUN)	9.962
5	Eva Rueda (ESP)	9.900
6	Gergana Peeva (BUL)	9.837
7	Olga Strazheva (URS)	9.775
8	Milena Mavrodieva (BUL)	9.250
