= 1989 World Artistic Gymnastics Championships =

Gymnastics competition

- Venue: Hanns-Martin-Schleyer-Halle
- Location: Stuttgart, West Germany
- Start date: October 14, 1989
- End date: October 22, 1989

The 25th Artistic Gymnastics World Championships were held in Stuttgart, West Germany, in 1989 from October 14 to October 22.

This was the first World Championships to use "new life" scoring. This meant that gymnasts' scores were not carried over to the all-around and the event finals from the team competition. The men's and women's event finals were also intermixed.

== Results ==
Event	Gold	Silver	Bronze
Men
Team all-around	Soviet Union; Igor Korobchinsky; Vladimir Artemov; Valentin Mogilny; Vitaly Marinich; Valery Belenky; Vladimir Novikov	East Germany; Andreas Wecker; Sven Tippelt; Sylvio Kroll; Jörg Behrend; Jens Milbradt; Enrico Ambros	China; Li Chunyang; Li Jing; Ma Zheng; Li Ge; Guo Linxian; Wang Chongsheng
Individual all-around	(Soviet Union) Igor Korobchinsky	(Soviet Union) Valentin Mogilny	(China) Li Jing
Floor	(Soviet Union) Igor Korobchinsky	(Soviet Union) Vladimir Artemov	(China) Li Chunyang
Pommel horse	(Soviet Union) Valentin Mogilny	(East Germany) Andreas Wecker	(China) Li Jing
Rings	(West Germany) Andreas Aguilar	(East Germany) Andreas Wecker	(Italy) Yuri Chechi (Soviet Union) Vitaly Marinich
Vault	(East Germany) Jörg Behrend	(East Germany) Sylvio Kroll	(Soviet Union) Vladimir Artemov
Parallel bars	(Soviet Union) Vladimir Artemov (China) Li Jing	none awarded	(East Germany) Andreas Wecker
Horizontal bar	(China) Li Chunyang	(Soviet Union) Vladimir Artemov	(Japan) Yukio Iketani
Women
Team all-around	Soviet Union; Natalia Laschenova; Olga Strazheva; Svetlana Boginskaya; Olesya Dudnik; Elena Sazonenkova; Svetlana Baitova	Romania; Daniela Silivaș; Gabriela Potorac; Cristina Bontaș; Eugenia Popa; Lăcrămioara Filip; Aurelia Dobre	China; Yang Bo; Chen Cuiting; Fan Di; Li Yan; Wang Wenjing; Ma Ying
Individual all-around	(Soviet Union) Svetlana Boginskaya	(Soviet Union) Natalia Laschenova	(Soviet Union) Olga Strazheva
Vault	(Soviet Union) Olesya Dudnik	(Romania) Cristina Bontaș (United States) Brandy Johnson	none awarded
Uneven bars	(Romania) Daniela Silivaș (China) Fan Di	none awarded	(Soviet Union) Olga Strazheva
Balance beam	(Romania) Daniela Silivaș	(Soviet Union) Olesya Dudnik	(Romania) Gabriela Potorac
Floor	(Soviet Union) Svetlana Boginskaya (Romania) Daniela Silivaș	none awarded	(Romania) Cristina Bontaș

== Men ==
=== Team Final ===
Rank	Team	Floor		Pommel Horse		Rings		Vault		Parallel Bars		Horizontal Bar		Total
Rank	Team	C	O	C	O	C	O	C	O	C	O	C	O	Total
Gold medal	URS	97.550		98.550		97.750		97.800		97.700		97.900		587.250
Gold medal	Igor Korobchinsky	9.850	9.850	9.900	9.950	9.750	9.750	9.800	9.900	9.750	9.700	9.800	9.800	117.800
Gold medal	Vladimir Artemov	9.900	9.500	9.800	9.900	9.800	9.750	9.700	9.850	9.800	9.900	9.900	9.850	117.650
Gold medal	Valentin Mogilny	9.700	9.700	9.700	10.000	9.800	9.800	9.700	9.800	9.750	9.850	9.800	9.500	117.100
Gold medal	Vitaly Marinich	9.800	9.750	9.750	9.800	9.750	9.900	9.700	9.800	9.650	9.700	9.700	9.650	116.950
Gold medal	Valery Belenky	9.550	9.700	9.800	9.900	9.700	9.700	9.650	9.900	9.550	9.750	9.750	9.700	116.650
Gold medal	Vladimir Novikov	9.800	9.200	9.750	9.250	9.600	9.750	9.650	9.700	9.750	9.800	9.800	9.850	115.900
Silver medal	GDR	96.550		96.200		97.350		97.800		96.300		96.700		580.850
Silver medal	Andreas Wecker	9.650	9.700	9.800	9.900	9.850	9.800	9.700	9.700	9.500	9.850	9.800	9.750	117.000
Silver medal	Sven Tippelt	9.800	9.650	9.800	9.700	9.750	9.900	9.700	9.900	9.550	9.900	9.750	9.400	116.800
Silver medal	Sylvio Kroll	9.700	9.700	9.750	9.400	9.600	9.800	9.850	9.900	9.500	9.800	9.650	9.800	116.450
Silver medal	Jörg Behrend	9.400	9.750	9.500	9.350	9.650	9.800	9.750	9.800	9.500	9.750	9.500	9.700	115.450
Silver medal	Jens Milbradt	9.550	9.550	9.400	9.600	9.550	9.650	9.550	9.750	9.150	9.450	9.150	9.700	114.050
Silver medal	Enrico Ambros	9.300	9.650	9.400	9.150	9.400	9.400	9.650	9.800	9.400	9.550	9.350	9.700	113.750
Bronze medal	CHN	95.400		97.350		96.700		96.600		96.400		96.800		579.300
Bronze medal	Li Chunyang	9.750	9.900	9.700	9.850	9.700	9.800	9.600	9.650	9.800	9.750	9.750	9.900	117.150
Bronze medal	Li Jing	9.500	9.450	9.750	9.950	9.700	9.550	9.700	9.800	9.500	9.800	9.700	9.750	116.150
Bronze medal	Ma Zheng	9.650	9.700	9.700	9.650	9.550	9.550	9.500	9.800	9.400	9.550	9.650	9.750	115.450
Bronze medal	Li Ge	9.300	9.000	9.650	9.750	9.650	9.700	9.400	9.700	9.450	9.750	9.500	9.550	114.400
Bronze medal	Guo Linxian	9.250	9.600	9.550	9.600	9.450	9.600	9.450	9.700	9.500	9.500	9.700	9.350	114.250
Bronze medal	Wang Chongsheng	9.550	0.000	9.750	0.000	9.700	9.750	9.550	9.800	9.600	9.700	9.700	3.000	90.100
4	JPN	94.900		95.850		96.760		96.100		95.300		96.650		575.550
4	Toshiharu Sato	9.550	9.600	9.600	9.900	9.800	9.800	9.600	9.800	9.500	9.400	9.800	9.700	116.050
4	Yukio Iketani	9.400	9.750	9.300	9.600	9.700	9.500	9.650	9.750	9.300	9.550	9.700	9.800	115.000
4	Yoshikazu Nakamura	9.350	9.550	9.700	9.800	9.550	9.500	9.600	9.700	9.450	9.550	9.600	9.400	114.750
4	Daisuke Nishikawa	9.350	9.600	9.000	9.750	9.650	9.600	9.650	9.250	9.400	9.600	9.600	9.700	114.150
4	Hiroyuki Kato	9.250	9.500	9.300	9.350	9.450	9.750	9.450	9.650	9.550	9.700	9.300	9.450	113.700
4	Masayuki Matsunaga	9.200	0.000	9.550	9.000	9.700	9.700	9.000	0.000	9.450	9.550	9.600	9.700	94.450

=== All-around ===
Rank	Gymnast	Floor (gymnastics)	Pommel horse	Rings (gymnastics)	Vault (gymnastics)	Parallel bars	Horizontal bar	Total
1st place, gold medalist(s)	Igor Korobchinsky (URS)	9.900	9.900	9.750	10.000	9.900	9.800	59.250
2nd place, silver medalist(s)	Valentin Mogilny (URS)	9.700	10.000	9.850	9.900	9.800	9.900	59.150
3rd place, bronze medalist(s)	Li Jing (CHN)	9.700	9.850	9.750	9.800	9.800	9.900	58.800
4	Yukio Iketani (JPN)	9.800	9.600	9.800	9.900	9.700	9.900	58.700
4	Andreas Wecker (GDR)	9.700	9.900	9.750	9.650	9.800	9.900	58.700
6	Vladimir Artemov (URS)	9.600	9.900	9.850	9.900	9.950	9.350	58.550
7	Li Ge (CHN)	9.750	9.550	9.800	9.700	9.800	9.900	58.500
8	Gyula Takacs (HUN)	9.800	9.600	9.650	9.850	9.650	9.900	58.450
8	Marius Gherman (ROU)	9.750	9.750	9.650	9.800	9.700	9.800	58.450
10	Sylvio Kroll (GDR)	9.550	9.900	9.850	9.900	9.800	9.300	58.300
10	Yuri Chechi (ITA)	9.550	9.750	9.900	9.850	9.500	9.750	58.300
12	Toshiharu Sato (JPN)	9.550	9.850	9.550	9.800	9.700	9.800	58.250
13	Sven Tippelt (GDR)	9.300	9.800	9.800	9.350	9.850	9.800	57.900
14	Csaba Fajkusz (HUN)	9.450	9.750	9.250	9.700	9.800	9.900	57.850
15	Paolo Bucci (ITA)	9.550	9.650	9.600	9.600	9.700	9.600	57.700
16	Alfonso Rodriguez (ESP)	9.300	9.650	9.750	9.650	9.400	9.800	57.550
16	Kalofer Hristozov (BUL)	9.750	9.750	9.550	9.700	9.800	9.900	57.550
18	Mike Beckmann (FRG)	9.150	9.700	9.600	9.750	9.550	9.750	57.500
18	Yoshikazu Nakamura (JPN)	9.700	9.800	9.700	9.800	8.700	9.750	57.450
20	Curtis Hibbert (CAN)	9.450	9.550	9.400	9.600	9.700	9.700	57.400
21	Marian Stoican (ROU)	9.450	9.650	9.300	9.800	9.500	9.650	57.350
22	Toth Balazs (HUN)	9.250	9.700	9.450	9.600	9.600	9.600	57.200
23	Li Chunyang (CHN)	9.600	9.000	9.700	9.700	9.800	9.300	57.100
24	Marian Rizan (ROU)	9.400	9.800	9.150	9.200	9.700	9.700	56.950
25	Ju Young-Sam (KOR)	9.650	9.600	9.350	9.250	9.600	9.300	56.750
26	Felix Aguilera (CUB)	8.850	9.500	9.200	9.600	9.800	9.700	56.650
27	James May (GBR)	9.350	9.250	9.300	9.750	9.200	9.700	56.550
27	Johan Jonasson (SWE)	9.450	9.750	9.450	9.500	8.800	9.600	56.550
29	Lance Ringnald (USA)	9.400	8.550	9.450	9.550	9.700	9.800	56.450
30	Conrad Voorsanger (USA)	9.050	9.450	9.550	9.500	9.100	9.550	56.200
31	Casimiro Suarez (CUB)	9.350	8.650	9.400	9.700	9.500	9.550	56.150
32	Dimitar Taskov (BUL)	9.250	9.250	8.950	9.800	9.400	9.250	55.900
33	Rene Plüss (SUI)	9.200	8.450	9.350	9.300	9.300	9.800	55.450
34	Patrice Casimir (FRA)	9.200	9.300	9.150	9.700	9.250	8.550	55.150
35	Kevin Davis (USA)	-	9.450	9.250	8.650	-	-	27.350
36	Ruggero Rossato (ITA)	-	-	9.300	-	-	-	9.300

=== Floor Exercise ===
Rank	Gymnast	Total
1st place, gold medalist(s)	Igor Korobchinsky (URS)	9.937
2nd place, silver medalist(s)	Vladimir Artemov (URS)	9.875
3rd place, bronze medalist(s)	Li Chunyang (CHN)	9.850
4	Marius Gherman (ROU)	9.787
5	Yuri Chechi (ITA)	9.775
6	Sven Tippelt (GDR)	9.750
7	Sylvio Kroll (GDR)	9.700
8	Toshiharu Sato (JPN)	9.575

=== Pommel Horse ===
1985 World champion Valentin Mogilny scored his third perfect 10 on the pommel horse at the competition, having done so in the team event and all-around finals as well, to win the event final.

Rank	Gymnast	Total
1st place, gold medalist(s)	Valentin Mogilny (URS)	10.000
2nd place, silver medalist(s)	Andreas Wecker (GDR)	9.962
3rd place, bronze medalist(s)	Li Jing (CHN)	9.937
4	Marian Rizan (ROU)	9.900
5	Li Chunyang (CHN)	9.875
6	Igor Korobchinsky (URS)	9.687
7	Dimitar Taskov (BUL)	9.100
8	Csaba Fajkusz (HUN)	8.700

=== Rings ===
The judges conferred numerous times during the event while deciding on sores. West German champion Andreas Aguilar's arms buckled on a strength element near the end of his routine, making the crowd gasp, and he finished his routine with a simple dismount. Dieter Hoffman, the East German coach of the silver medalist, publicly disagreed with their respective scores, saying, "It was not a correct decision."

Rank	Gymnast	Total
1st place, gold medalist(s)	Andreas Aguilar (FRG)	9.875
2nd place, silver medalist(s)	Andreas Wecker (GDR)	9.862
3rd place, bronze medalist(s)	Yuri Chechi (ITA)	9.812
3rd place, bronze medalist(s)	Vitaly Marinich (URS)	9.812
5	Sven Tippelt (GDR)	9.762
6	Toshiharu Sato (JPN)	9.625
7	Valentin Mogilny (URS)	9.500
8	Kalofer Hristozov (BUL)	9.375

=== Vault ===
Rank	Gymnast	Total
1st place, gold medalist(s)	Jörg Behrend (GDR)	9.881
2nd place, silver medalist(s)	Sylvio Kroll (GDR)	9.874
3rd place, bronze medalist(s)	Vladimir Artemov (URS)	9.868
4	Marius Gherman (ROU)	9.799
5	Gyula Takacs (HUN)	9.737
6	Marian Stoican (ROU)	9.718
7	Igor Korobchinsky (URS)	9.625
8	Li Jing (CHN)	9.593

=== Parallel Bars ===
Rank	Gymnast	Total
1st place, gold medalist(s)	Vladimir Artemov (URS)	9.900
1st place, gold medalist(s)	Li Jing (CHN)	9.900
3rd place, bronze medalist(s)	Andreas Wecker (GDR)	9.887
4	Valentin Mogilny (URS)	9.725
5	Marian Rizan (ROU)	9.625
6	Balazs Toth (HUN)	9.487
7	Gyula Takacs (HUN)	9.475
8	Sven Tippelt (GDR)	9.225

=== Horizontal Bar ===
Rank	Gymnast	Total
1st place, gold medalist(s)	Li Chunyang (CHN)	9.950
2nd place, silver medalist(s)	Vladimir Artemov (URS)	9.900
3rd place, bronze medalist(s)	Yukio Iketani (JPN)	9.875
4	Vladimir Novikov (URS)	9.850
5	Curtis Hibbert (CAN)	9.825
6	Andreas Wecker (GDR)	9.787
7	Toshiharu Sato (JPN)	9.762
8	Csaba Fajkusz (HUN)	9.237

== Women ==
=== Team Final ===
Rank	Team	Vault (gymnastics)		Uneven bars		Balance beam		Floor (gymnastics)		Total
Rank	Team	C	O	C	O	C	O	C	O	Total
1st place, gold medalist(s)	Soviet Union	99.473		98.874		98.961		99.485		396.793
1st place, gold medalist(s)	Natalia Laschenova	9.987	10.000	9.887	9.950	9.762	9.962	9.925	9.987	79.460
1st place, gold medalist(s)	Olga Strazheva	9.925	9.862	9.962	9.950	9.775	9.925	9.937	9.987	79.323
1st place, gold medalist(s)	Svetlana Boginskaya	9.975	9.950	9.925	10.000	9.950	9.475	9.987	10.000	79.262
1st place, gold medalist(s)	Olesya Dudnik	9.962	10.000	9.362	9.862	9.900	10.000	10.000	9.950	79.036
1st place, gold medalist(s)	Elena Sazonenkova	9.875	9.837	9.850	9.950	9.837	9.925	9.837	9.875	78.986
1st place, gold medalist(s)	Svetlana Baitova	9.862	9.937	9.800	9.900	9.650	9.925	9.775	9.837	78.686
2nd place, silver medalist(s)	Romania	99.311		98.599		98.173		98.848		394.931
2nd place, silver medalist(s)	Daniela Silivaș	10.000	9.962	9.912	10.000	9.825	9.900	9.962	10.000	79.561
2nd place, silver medalist(s)	Gabriela Potorac	9.950	9.975	9.950	9.925	9.800	9.887	9.850	9.900	79.237
2nd place, silver medalist(s)	Cristina Bontaș	9.925	9.975	9.625	9.900	9.687	9.937	9.837	9.987	78.873
2nd place, silver medalist(s)	Eugenia Popa	9.912	9.850	9.825	9.912	9.600	9.837	9.675	9.887	78.498
2nd place, silver medalist(s)	Lăcrămioara Filip	9.750	9.875	9.650	9.900	9.675	9.862	9.775	9.850	78.337
2nd place, silver medalist(s)	Aurelia Dobre	9.837	9.900	8.925	9.887	9.650	9.950	9.800	8.987	76.936
3rd place, bronze medalist(s)	China	98.236		98.135		98.760		96.985		392.116
3rd place, bronze medalist(s)	Yang Bo	9.825	9.875	9.937	9.925	9.950	9.975	9.937	9.837	79.261
3rd place, bronze medalist(s)	Chen Cuiting	9.687	9.925	9.700	9.912	9.837	9.987	9.775	9.925	78.748
3rd place, bronze medalist(s)	Fan Di	9.900	9.825	9.850	9.962	9.737	9.850	9.800	9.737	78.661
3rd place, bronze medalist(s)	Li Yan	9.587	9.887	9.700	9.875	9.800	9.825	9.587	9.600	77.861
3rd place, bronze medalist(s)	Wang Wenjing	9.800	9.487	9.862	9.412	9.762	9.912	9.675	9.037	76.947
3rd place, bronze medalist(s)	Ma Ying	9.700	9.812	9.562	9.325	9.650	9.950	9.662	8.900	76.561
4	United States	98.036		97.748		96.637		97.510		389.925
4	Sandy Woolsey	9.800	9.812	9.837	9.900	9.537	9.900	9.662	9.825	78.273
4	Wendy Bruce	9.837	9.875	9.725	9.762	9.512	9.875	9.662	9.862	78.110
4	Brandy Johnson	9.900	9.900	9.887	9.362	9.750	9.762	9.850	9.350	77.761
4	Christy Henrich	9.762	9.750	9.825	9.937	9.087	9.787	9.725	9.750	77.749
4	Chelle Stack	9.637	9.750	9.675	9.800	9.337	9.812	9.600	9.887	77.949
4	Kim Kelly	9.650	9.737	9.550	9.400	9.362	9.175	9.550	9.687	76.111

=== All-around ===
Rank	Gymnast	Vault (gymnastics)	Uneven bars	Balance beam	Floor (gymnastics)	Total
1st place, gold medalist(s)	Svetlana Boginskaya (URS)	10.000	9.950	9.950	10.000	39.900
2nd place, silver medalist(s)	Natalia Laschenova (URS)	10.000	10.000	9.875	9.987	39.862
3rd place, bronze medalist(s)	Olga Strazheva (URS)	9.962	9.925	9.925	9.962	39.774
4	Cristina Bontaș (ROM)	9.875	9.900	9.987	10.000	39.762
5	Yang Bo (CHN)	9.962	9.875	9.900	9.950	39.687
6	Chen Cuiting (CHN)	9.950	9.875	9.900	9.937	39.662
7	Brandy Johnson (USA)	9.937	9.925	9.887	9.825	39.574
8	Sandy Woolsey (USA)	9.950	9.850	9.775	9.900	39.475
9	Bärbel Wielgoss (GDR)	9.887	9.900	9.800	9.862	39.449
10	Choi Gyong-hui (PRK)	9.887	9.850	9.850	9.812	39.399
11	Wendy Bruce (USA)	9.912	9.687	9.862	9.925	39.386
12	Daniela Silivaș (ROM)	9.925	9.975	9.437	9.975	39.312
13	Eva Rueda (ESP)	9.912	9.787	9.675	9.912	39.286
14	Kim Gwang-suk (PRK)	9.837	9.612	9.850	9.912	39.211
15	Miho Shinoda (JPN)	9.862	9.737	9.712	9.837	39.148
16	Gabriela Potorac (ROM)	9.937	9.400	9.987	9.750	39.074
17	Fan Di (CHN)	9.925	9.950	9.312	9.775	38.962
18	Larissa Lowing (CAN)	9.912	9.875	9.775	9.325	38.887
19	Henrietta Ónodi (HUN)	9.900	9.925	9.175	9.837	38.837
20	Deliana Vodenicharova (BUL)	9.725	9.700	9.550	9.850	38.825
21	Gergana Peeva (BUL)	9.775	9.612	9.512	9.900	38.799
22	Lori Strong (CAN)	9.862	9.475	9.762	9.625	38.724
23	Sarah Mercer (GBR)	9.762	9.687	9.700	9.550	38.699
24	Karine Mermet (FRA)	9.975	9.737	9.250	9.725	38.687
25	Monique Allen (AUS)	9.712	9.637	9.575	9.750	38.674
26	Eszter Óváry (HUN)	9.875	9.650	9.375	9.737	38.637
27	Kim Myong-hwa (PRK)	9.862	9.537	9.587	9.650	38.636
28	Leah Homma (CAN)	9.525	9.700	9.687	9.650	38.562
29	Milena Mavrodieva (BUL)	9.837	9.200	9.612	9.825	38.474
30	Krisztina Kovács (HUN)	9.887	9.775	9.712	9.087	38.461
31	Alicia Fernández (ESP)	9.650	9.775	9.275	9.725	38.425
32	Roberta Kirchmayer (ITA)	9.762	9.712	9.125	9.662	38.261
33	Astrid Heese (GDR)	9.712	9.250	9.650	9.512	38.124
34	Tanya Koste (GDR)	9.412	9.550	8.900	9.775	37.637
35	Iveta Poloková (TCH)	9.862	8.475	9.250	9.862	37.449
36	Giulia Volpi (ITA)	9.650	9.587	8.512	9.612	37.361

=== Vault ===
Brandy Johnson was awarded scores of 9.937 and 9.950 for her two vaults in competition, giving her an average score of 9.943, enough for third place and the bronze medal, which was presented to her at the medal ceremony. Subsequently, however, the judges accepted a protest from the US and revised her score to an average of 9.950, to share second place with Cristina Bontaș. She returned to the arena to be awarded her silver medal before the medal ceremony for uneven bars. Winner Olesya Dudnik was the only finalist to stick both vaults.

Rank	Gymnast	Total
1st place, gold medalist(s)	Olesya Dudnik (URS)	9.987
2nd place, silver medalist(s)	Cristina Bontaș (ROM)	9.950
2nd place, silver medalist(s)	Brandy Johnson (USA)	9.950
4	Natalia Laschenova (URS)	9.868
5	Milena Mavrodieva (BUL)	9.812
6	Gabriela Potorac (ROM)	9.763
7	Fan Di (CHN)	9.568
8	Larissa Lowing (CAN)	9.212

=== Uneven Bars ===
Rank	Gymnast	Total
1st place, gold medalist(s)	Fan Di (CHN)	10.000
1st place, gold medalist(s)	Daniela Silivaș (ROM)	10.000
3rd place, bronze medalist(s)	Olga Strazheva (URS)	9.975
4	Christy Henrich (USA)	9.950
5	Gabriela Potorac (ROM)	9.925
6	Yang Bo (CHN)	9.900
7	Sandy Woolsey (USA)	9.800
8	Svetlana Boginskaya (URS)	9.450

=== Balance Beam ===
Rank	Gymnast	Total
1st place, gold medalist(s)	Daniela Silivaș (ROM)	9.950
2nd place, silver medalist(s)	Olesya Dudnik (URS)	9.937
3rd place, bronze medalist(s)	Gabriela Potorac (ROM)	9.887
4	Chen Cuiting (CHN)	9.862
5	Henrietta Ónodi (HUN)	9.837
6	Elena Sazonenkova (URS)	9.825
7	Yang Bo (CHN)	9.800
8	Miho Shinoda (JPN)	9.700

=== Floor Exercise ===
Rank	Gymnast	Total
1st place, gold medalist(s)	Svetlana Boginskaya (URS)	10.000
1st place, gold medalist(s)	Daniela Silivaș (ROM)	10.000
3rd place, bronze medalist(s)	Cristina Bontaș (ROM)	9.962
4	Olesya Dudnik (URS)	9.950
5	Chen Cuiting (CHN)	9.912
6	Milena Mavrodieva (BUL)	9.825
7	Yang Bo (CHN)	9.775
8	Choi Gyong-hui (PRK)	8.950

== Medals ==
=== Overall ===
Rank	Nation	Gold	Silver	Bronze	Total
1	Soviet Union (URS)	9	5	4	18
2	Romania (ROU)	3	2	2	7
3	China (CHN)	3	0	5	8
4	East Germany (GDR)	1	4	1	6
5	West Germany (FRG)	1	0	0	1
6	United States (USA)	0	1	0	1
7	Italy (ITA)	0	0	1	1
7	Japan (JPN)	0	0	1	1
Totals (8 entries)		17	12	14	43

=== Men ===
Rank	Nation	Gold	Silver	Bronze	Total
1	Soviet Union	5	3	2	10
2	China	2	0	4	6
3	East Germany	1	4	1	6
4	West Germany	1	0	0	1
5	Italy	0	0	1	1
5	Japan	0	0	1	1
Totals (6 entries)		9	7	9	25

=== Women ===
Rank	Nation	Gold	Silver	Bronze	Total
1	Soviet Union	4	2	2	8
2	Romania (ROU)	3	2	2	7
3	China	1	0	1	2
4	United States	0	1	0	1
Totals (4 entries)		8	5	5	18

== Opening Event ==
The opening event was created and organised by Traumfabrik
