= Chen Cuiting =

Chinese artistic gymnast (born 1972)

- Born: 15 November 1972 (age 53) Changsha, Hunan, China
- Height: 1.43 m (4 ft 8 in)

Gymnastics career
- Discipline: Women's artistic gymnastics
- Country represented: China (1985–1990)
- Head coach: Zhou Xiaolin
- Retired: 1990
Medal record
Representing China
World Championships
Bronze medal – third place	1989 Stuttgart	Team
Asian Games
Gold medal – first place	1986 Seoul	Team
Gold medal – first place	1986 Seoul	All-around
Gold medal – first place	1986 Seoul	Floor exercise
Gold medal – first place	1990 Beijing	Team
Gold medal – first place	1990 Beijing	All-around
Gold medal – first place	1990 Beijing	Floor exercise
Silver medal – second place	1986 Seoul	Vault
Silver medal – second place	1990 Beijing	Vault
Goodwill Games
Bronze medal – third place	1986 Moscow	Team

Chen Cuiting (Chinese: 陳翠婷; pinyin: Chén Cuìtíng; born 15 November 1972) is a retired Chinese artistic gymnast who represented China at the 1988 Summer Olympics. She is the 1986 and 1990 Asian Games all-around and floor exercise champion. She won a team bronze medal at the 1989 World Championships.

== Gymnastics career ==
Chen won a gold medal on the floor exercise and placed fifth in the all-around at the 1985 Riga International. She won a bronze medal with the Chinese team at the 1986 Goodwill Games. Individually, she finished fifth in the all-around, eighth on the vault, seventh on the uneven bars, and sixth on the balance beam. Then at the 1986 Asian Games, she helped China win the team title, and she won the all-around and floor exercise titles. She also won a silver medal on the vault.

Chen was a member of the team at the 1987 World Championships that finished in fourth. Individually, she finished eleventh in the all-around and sixth on the floor exercise.

Chen represented China at the 1988 Summer Olympics alongside Fan Di, Wang Wenjing, Wang Huiying, Ma Ying, and Wang Xiaoyan. The Chinese team finished sixth in the team final, and Chen finished fourteenth in the all-around final.

Chen won a bronze medal with her team at the 1989 World Championships. She also finished sixth in the all-around, fourth on beam, and fifth on floor.

Chen finished ninth in the all-around prelims at the 1990 American Cup. She competed at the 1990 Asian Games and defended her gold medals in the team event, the all-around, and on the floor exercise. She also won another vault silver medal. The 1990 Asian Games was also her last competition before retirement.

== Personal life ==
After retirement, Chen moved to Hong Kong and worked as a judge at international events.

== Competitive history ==
Competitive history of Chen Cuiting
Year	Event	Team	AA	VT	UB	BB	FX
1985	International Junior Championships						2nd place, silver medalist(s)
1985	Moscow News						3rd place, bronze medalist(s)
1985	Riga International		4			3rd place, bronze medalist(s)	1st place, gold medalist(s)
1986
1986	Asian Games	1st place, gold medalist(s)	1st place, gold medalist(s)	2nd place, silver medalist(s)			1st place, gold medalist(s)
1986	Goodwill Games		6	8	7	6	
1986	USA-CHN Dual Meet	1st place, gold medalist(s)	4				
1987	Chinese Sports Festival		1st place, gold medalist(s)				
1987	Shenyang International		1st place, gold medalist(s)				
1987	World Championships	4	11				6
1988	All-Chinese Championships		1st place, gold medalist(s)				
1988	Olympic Games	6	14				
1988	World Sports Fair		8	2nd place, silver medalist(s)			
1989	China Cup		4	3rd place, bronze medalist(s)		2nd place, silver medalist(s)	
1989	Chinese Championships		7				
1989	French International		4				1st place, gold medalist(s)
1989	World Championships	3rd place, bronze medalist(s)	6			4	5
1990	American Cup		9				
1990	Asian Games	1st place, gold medalist(s)	1st place, gold medalist(s)	2nd place, silver medalist(s)			1st place, gold medalist(s)
1990	China Cup		2nd place, silver medalist(s)				
1990	International Mixed Pairs	2nd place, silver medalist(s)					
