= Pryakhin =

Pryakhin (Russian: Пряхин) is a Russian masculine surname originating from the word pryaha (female weaver); its feminine counterpart is Pryakhina. It may refer to the following notable people:

- Aleftina Pryakhina (born 1972), Soviet artistic gymnast
- Sergei Pryakhin (born 1963), Russian ice hockey forward
