= Natalia Kalinina =

Soviet and Ukrainian gymnast (born 1973)

- Full name: Natalia Georgiyevna Kalinina
- Alternative name: Natasha
- Born: 16 December 1973 (age 52) Kherson, Ukrainian SSR, Soviet Union

Gymnastics career
- Discipline: Women's artistic gymnastics
- Country represented: Ukraine (1993–1995)
- Former countries represented: Soviet Union (1987–1992); CIS
- Club: Dynamo Kherson
- Head coaches: Oleg and Nadezhda Ostapenko
- Former coaches: Viktor Petrushkin and Valentina Batischeva
- Retired: 1995
Medal record
| Event | 1st | 2nd | 3rd |
|---|---|---|---|
| World Championships | 1 | 0 | 0 |
| European Championships | 1 | 2 | 1 |
| Goodwill Games | 4 | 2 | 0 |
| Summer Universiade | 3 | 0 | 1 |
| Total | 9 | 4 | 2 |
Representing Soviet Union
World Championships
| Gold medal – first place | 1991 Indianapolis | Team |
European Championships
| Gold medal – first place | 1990 Athens | Uneven bars |
| Silver medal – second place | 1990 Athens | All-around |
| Silver medal – second place | 1990 Athens | Balance beam |
Goodwill Games
| Gold medal – first place | 1990 Seattle | Team |
| Gold medal – first place | 1990 Seattle | All-around |
| Gold medal – first place | 1990 Seattle | Balance beam |
| Gold medal – first place | 1990 Seattle | Floor exercise |
| Silver medal – second place | 1990 Seattle | Vault |
| Silver medal – second place | 1990 Seattle | Uneven bars |
Representing Ukraine
European Championships
| Bronze medal – third place | 1994 Stockholm | Team |
Summer Universiade
| Gold medal – first place | 1993 Buffalo | Team |
| Gold medal – first place | 1993 Buffalo | Vault |
| Gold medal – first place | 1993 Buffalo | Uneven bars |
| Bronze medal – third place | 1995 Fukuoka | Floor exercise |

Natalia Georgiyevna Kalinina (Russian: Наталья Георгиевна Калинина [kɐˈlʲinʲɪnə], Ukrainian: Наталія Георгіївна Калініна; born 16 December 1973), is a former artistic gymnast that competed for the Soviet Union and Ukraine. She was a member of the last Soviet world championship team to win a gold medal in 1991. She was the 1990 European champion on the uneven bars. At the 1990 Goodwill Games, she won a medal on every event with 4 golds and 2 silvers, including the all-around gold medal. She was not selected to compete for the Unified Team at the 1992 Summer Olympics. She believes that politics would only allow three gymnasts to come from one republic, and there were already three gymnasts from Ukraine selected.

== Early life ==
Kalinina was born in Kherson, Ukrainian SSR, on 16 December 1973. Her parents are Georgiy Kalinin and Antonina Kalinina. She has a sister named Svetlana. She began gymnastics in 1979.

== Gymnastics career ==
=== 1988–1989 ===
Kalinina's international debut was at the 1988 Junior Friendship Tournament (Druzhba) where she won gold with her team and finished fifth in the all-around. Later that year she competed in the Junior GDR-USSR Dual Meet, and she won medals in every event, four gold and two silver.

In 1989, Kalinina won a silver medal in the all-around at the Chunichi Cup behind teammate Natalia Laschenova. At the DTB Cup, she finished ninth in the all-around, but finished fifth on vault and won silver on the uneven bars. Kalinina then competed at the Tokyo Cup, where she won gold on the uneven bars. She finished seventh in the all-around at the USSR National Championships, and she finished third in the all-around and second on bars at the USSR Cup.

=== 1990 ===
Kalinina's first competition in 1990 was the American Cup, and she finished second in the all-around behind American Kim Zmeskal. She finished in first on the vault, beam, and floor exercise. She then went on to compete at the 1990 European Championships, where she won silver in the all-around behind teammate Svetlana Boginskaya. In the event finals, she finished fourth on vault, won silver on balance beam, and gold on uneven bars. Then Kalinina went on to compete at the 1990 Goodwill Games, and this turned out to be her international breakthrough. Kalinina won a medal in all six events. The Soviet Team won team gold, and Kalinina won the all-around gold medal with a total of 39.836 and a perfect 10 on floor. In the event finals, she won gold on beam and floor, and she won silver on vault and bars. She teamed up with Alexander Kolyvanov for the International Mixed Pairs Competition, where they finished in fourteenth. At the USSR Championships, Kalinina finished second in the all-around behind Elena Sazonenkova. She finished fifth in the all-around at the USSR Cup, but she won bronze medals on bars, beam, and floor. Kalinina finished the season by winning gold on the uneven bars at the Moscow News event.

=== 1991 ===
Kalinina's first competition of the year was the Blume Memorial, where she finished sixth in the all-around. She then competed at the World Stars event. She finished second in the all-around behind teammate Tatiana Gutsu, and she won gold in the balance beam final with a 9.925. At the USSR Championships, she finished third in the all-around behind Tatiana Gutsu and Tatiana Lysenko. In the event finals, she finished seventh on vault, fourth on beam, and won gold on bars with a 9.987. At the ITA-USSR Dual Meet, she finished sixth in the all-around and won gold with the team. She was then selected for what would be the last Soviet World Championship team. The Soviet team won the gold medal by almost two points. Kalinina was fourteenth in the all-around in the prelims, but she did not qualify for the final due to three of her teammates placing ahead of her.

=== 1992 ===
At the CIS Championships, Kalinina placed fifth in the all-around. However, she was not named to compete for the Unified Team at the 1992 Summer Olympics. She has stated that she believes that politics would not allow more than three gymnasts from one republic. Tatiana Gutsu, Tatiana Lysenko, and team alternate Ludmila Stovbchataya were already on the roster for Ukraine. She then competed at the World Stars event, where she finished third in the all-around behind Gutsu and Lysenko.

=== 1993–1995 ===
Kalinina began attending college in Kyiv, but she continued to compete. She finished fourth in the all-around at the 1993 Chunichi Cup. Later that year at the Tokyo Cup, she finished sixth on bars and seventh on floor. Kalinina then competed at the 1993 Summer Universiade, and the Ukrainian team won gold, and Kalinina finished sixth in the all-around. In the event finals, she won gold on vault and uneven bars.

Kalinina competed at the 1994 European Championships, and she finished eighth in the all-around. She was the 1994 Ukrainian all-round champion. Her last competition before retirement was the 1995 Summer Universiade. She finished fourth in the all-around, and won bronze on floor.

== After gymnastics ==
After graduating from college, Kalinina moved to Moscow, where she joined the circus. She married fellow performer Mikhail Tsitsilin, and they relocated to his hometown, Voronezh, where they began coaching gymnastics. They moved to the United States in 2000. She coached gymnastics at the Peninsula Gymnastics club in San Mateo, California until 2009, and then worked at Gold Star Gymnastics in Mountain View, California until 2017. She now goes by Natasha, the informal name of Natalia in Russian.

== Competitive history ==
Competitive history of Natalia Kalinina
| Year | Event | Team | AA | VT | UB | BB | FX |
|---|---|---|---|---|---|---|---|
| 1988 | Junior Friendship Tournament | 1st place, gold medalist(s) | 5 | | | | |
| 1988 | GDR-USSR Dual Meet | 1st place, gold medalist(s) | 1st place, gold medalist(s) | 2nd place, silver medalist(s) | 2nd place, silver medalist(s) | 1st place, gold medalist(s) | 1st place, gold medalist(s) |
| 1989 | Chunichi Cup | | 2nd place, silver medalist(s) | | | | |
| 1989 | DTB Cup | | 9 | 5 | 2nd place, silver medalist(s) | | |
| 1989 | Tokyo Cup | | | | | 1st place, gold medalist(s) | |
| 1989 | USSR Championships | | 7 | | | | |
| 1989 | USSR Cup | | 3rd place, bronze medalist(s) | | 2nd place, silver medalist(s) | | |
| 1990 | American Cup | | 2nd place, silver medalist(s) | 1st place, gold medalist(s) | | 1st place, gold medalist(s) | 1st place, gold medalist(s) |
| 1990 | European Championships | | 2nd place, silver medalist(s) | 4 | 1st place, gold medalist(s) | 2nd place, silver medalist(s) | |
| 1990 | Goodwill Games | 1st place, gold medalist(s) | 1st place, gold medalist(s) | 2nd place, silver medalist(s) | 2nd place, silver medalist(s) | 1st place, gold medalist(s) | 1st place, gold medalist(s) |
| 1990 | International Mixed Pairs | | 14 | | | | |
| 1990 | USSR Championships | | 2nd place, silver medalist(s) | | | | |
| 1990 | USSR Cup | | 5 | | 3rd place, bronze medalist(s) | 3rd place, bronze medalist(s) | 3rd place, bronze medalist(s) |
| 1990 | Moscow News | | | 1st place, gold medalist(s) | | | |
| 1991 | Blume Memorial | | 6 | | | | |
| 1991 | World Stars | | 2nd place, silver medalist(s) | | | 1st place, gold medalist(s) | |
| 1991 | USSR Championships | | 3rd place, bronze medalist(s) | 7 | 1st place, gold medalist(s) | | 4 |
| 1991 | USSR-ITA Dual Meet | 1st place, gold medalist(s) | 6 | | | | |
| 1991 | World Championships | 1st place, gold medalist(s) | | | | | |
| 1992 | CIS Championships | | 5 | | | | |
| 1992 | World Stars | | 3rd place, bronze medalist(s) | | | | |
| 1993 | Chunichi Cup | | 4 | | | | |
| 1993 | Tokyo Cup | | | | 6 | | 7 |
| 1993 | Summer Universiade | 1st place, gold medalist(s) | 6 | 1st place, gold medalist(s) | | 1st place, gold medalist(s) | |
1994
| 1994 | European Championships | | 8 | | | | |
| 1994 | Ukrainian Championships | | 1st place, gold medalist(s) | | | | |
| 1995 | Summer Universiade | | 4 | | | | 3rd place, bronze medalist(s) |
