= 1987 European Artistic Gymnastics Championships =

The 1987 European Artistic Gymnastics Championships consisted of the following competitions held in Moscow, Soviet Union, from 21 to 24 May 1987:

- 1987 European Men's Artistic Gymnastics Championships;
- 1987 European Women's Artistic Gymnastics Championships.
