= Eugenia Popa =

Romanian artistic gymnast

- Born: 10 September 1973 (age 52) Bucharest

Gymnastics career
- Discipline: Women's artistic gymnastics
- Country represented: Romania
- Club: Dinamo
- Head coach: Octavian Belu
- Assistant coach: Mariana Bitang
- Former coaches: Rodica Apateanu & Liviu Mazilu, both now coaching at Pacific West Gymnastics
- Retired: 1992
Medal record
World Championships
Silver medal – second place	1989 Stuttgart	Team
Bronze medal – third place	1991 Indianapolis	Team

Eugenia Popa (born 10 September 1973 in Bucharest, Romania) is a retired Romanian artistic gymnast. She won two world championship medals with the team: a silver medal in 1989 and a bronze medal in 1991. She was an alternate to the 1992 silver winning Romanian Olympic team. After retirement she became a coach of artistic gymnastics. She currently coaches at Salto Gymnastics Centre in Lisburn, Northern Ireland.
