= Tatiana Groshkova =

Soviet artistic gymnast

- Nickname: Tanya
- Born: December 16, 1973 (age 52)

Gymnastics career
- Discipline: Women's artistic gymnastics
- Country represented: Russia
- Former countries represented: Soviet Union
- Gym: Moscow Dynamo, Round Lake
- Former coach: Elvira Saadi
- Retired: 1991
Medal record
European Championships
Silver medal – second place	1990 Athens	Floor Exercise

Tatiana Groshkova (born December 16, 1973) is a retired elite female gymnast who competed for the U.S.S.R. women's artistic gymnastics team from the mid-1980s to the early 1990s.

== Personal life ==
Groshkova was born December 16, 1973 in Moschow. Her father was an assembler, and her mother worked as a cook for a nursery school.

== Career ==
Groshkova began gymnastics at age 5 under coach Elena Loginova. Beginning at age 6, Groshkova trained under Olympic-gymnast-turned-coach Elvira Saadi at the Moscow Dynamo Club, which is the gym where 2000 Sydney Olympics floor and vault champion Elena Zamolodchikova later trained.

In 1986, Groshkova placed third all-around and earned a share of the U.S.S.R team gold medal at the Junior GDR-USSR Dual Meet.

At the 1989 U.S.S.R. championships, Groshkova placed 3rd in the all-around, and at the 1989 Tokyo Cup she won floor exercise. She placed second on floor and 10th all-around at the 1990 European Championships. Also in 1990, Groshkova won the all-around at the Trophee Massilia and the Avignon International.

The major skills in her repertoire included a double twisting double back somersault and double layout on floor; a Comaneci and full-in dismount on uneven bars; and a combination back handspring to full-twisting laid-out backflip, along with a full-in dismount on balance beam.
