= Mirjana Bilić =

Serbian gymnast (born 1936)

- Full name: Mirjana Bilić
- Born: 11 May 1936 (age 90) Bačka Topola, Kingdom of Yugoslavia

Gymnastics career
- Discipline: Women's artistic gymnastics
- Country represented: Yugoslavia
Medal record
Women's Gymnastics
Representing Yugoslavia
European Championship
Gold medal – first place	1963 Paris	Individual all-around
Gold medal – first place	1963 Paris	Floor
Bronze medal – third place	1963 Paris	Beam

Mirjana Bilić-Vukas (Serbian Cyrillic: Mирјана Билић, born 11 May 1936 in Bačka Topola) is a former Serbian gymnast who competed internationally for Yugoslavia.

She represented Yugoslavia at the 1960 Summer Olympics.
