= Ewa Rydell =

Swedish artistic gymnast

Personal information
- Born: 26 February 1942 (age 84) Gothenburg, Sweden
- Height: 1.55 m (5 ft 1 in)
- Weight: 50 kg (110 lb)

Sport
- Sport: Artistic gymnastics
- Club: GF Juno, Göteborg
Medal record
Representing Sweden
European Championships
Gold medal – first place	1963 Paris	Balance beam
Bronze medal – third place	1963 Paris	All-around

Ewa Rydell (born 26 February 1942) is a Swedish former artistic gymnast who won two medals at the 1963 European Championships. She competed at the 1960 and 1964 Olympics and finished in the 11th and 8th place with the Swedish team, respectively. Her father Sven Rydell won a bronze medal in football at the 1924 Olympics.
