= Milena Mavrodieva =

Bulgarian artistic gymnast (born 1974)

- Born: 4 August 1974 (age 52)

Gymnastics career
- Discipline: Women's artistic gymnastics
- Country represented: Bulgaria
Medal record
European Championships
Silver medal – second place	1989 Brussels	Vault
Bronze medal – third place	1990 Athens	Floor exercise

Milena Mavrodieva (Bulgarian: Милена Мавродиева) (born 4 August 1974) is a Bulgarian former artistic gymnast. She won a silver medal on vault at the 1989 European Championships and a bronze medal on floor at the 1990 European Championships.

== Career ==
Mavrodieva placed 21st in the all-around at the 1989 European Championships. In the apparatus finals, she won silver on vault. Later that year, at the World Championships, she placed 29th in the all-around and qualified to two event finals, vault (where she placed 5th) and floor exercise (where she placed 6th).

The next year, Mavrodieva was 15th at the European Championships and tied for bronze on floor exercise with Henrietta Ónodi.

=== Doping case ===
In April 1992, a few days before the 1992 World Championships, Mavrodieva, along with fellow Bulgarian gymnasts Maya Hristova and Mirela Paneva, tested positive for furosemide, a diuretic often used for weight loss but banned because it can also mask the use of other drugs. The gymnasts were banned from competing for two years.

All the gymnasts on the national team trained together, so journalists questioned why only these three gymnasts, who represented the same club (Levski Spartak), had tested positive. The gymnasts claimed that that they were told by the team doctor to say where the drug had come from, and two (including Mavrodieva) said that they did not provide the tested urine sample. The team doctor was dismissed. When the second "B samples" were prepared for testing, one vial showed evidence of tampering. However, the ban was upheld.

The gymnastics federation argued that there were procedural issues across the doping control process, and on 27 July, 1992, the suspensions were overturned, as the samples were found to be invalid due to procedural violations. The ruling came too late to allow the gymnasts to attempt to make the team for the 1992 Summer Olympics.

== Post-gymnastics career ==
Mavrodieva became a coach at the Levski Spartak club in 2003, and she has also worked with gymnasts on the national team.
