= Sachiko Morimura =

Japanese gymnast

Personal information
- Full name: 森村幸子 Morimura Sachiko
- Nationality: Japanese
- Born: 28 January 1972 (age 53)

Sport
- Sport: Gymnastics

Sachiko Morimura (森村幸子, Morimura Sachiko, born 28 January 1972) is a Japanese gymnast. She competed in six events at the 1988 Summer Olympics.
