= Fan Di =

Chinese artistic gymnast

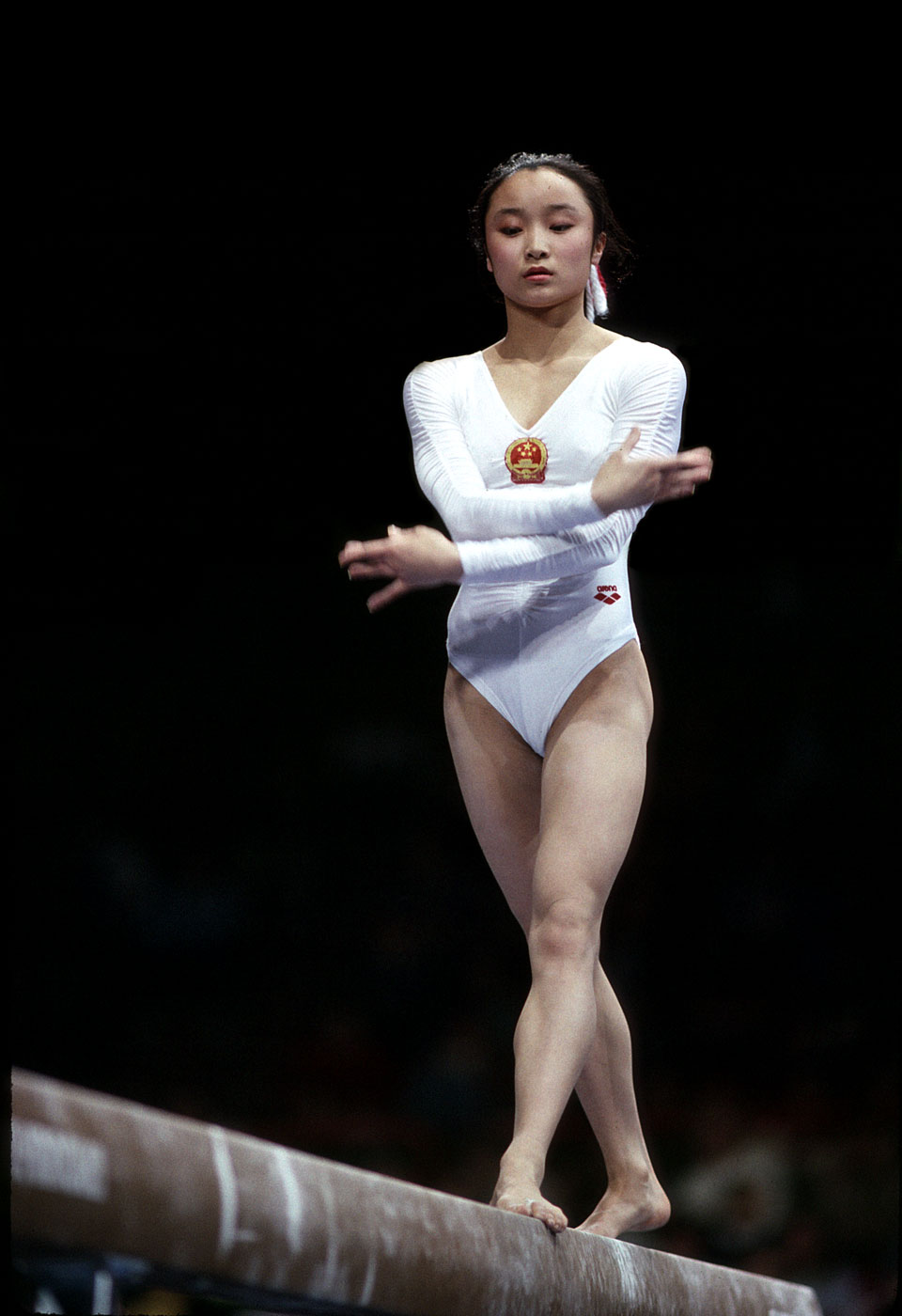
- Fan Di in 1990

Personal information
- Born: February 25, 1973 (age 53) Changning District, Shanghai, China
- Height: 1.44 m (4 ft 9 in)

Gymnastics career
- Discipline: Women's artistic gymnastics
- Country represented: China
- Head coach: Huang Yubin
- Retired: 1990
Medal record
Representing China
World Championships
Gold medal – first place	1989 Stuttgart	Uneven bars
Bronze medal – third place	1989 Stuttgart	Team
Asian Games
Gold medal – first place	1990 Beijing	Team
Gold medal – first place	1990 Beijing	Uneven bars

Fan Di (Chinese: 樊迪; born 25 February 1973) is a Chinese former artistic gymnast. She was the 1989 World Champion on the uneven bars, and was only the second Chinese female gymnast to become a World Champion after Ma Yanhong in 1979. She also won a bronze medal with her team at those World Championships. In 1987, Fan competed at the World Championships where the Chinese team finished in fourth. Individually, she finished 20th in the all-around and sixth on bars. Fan represented China at the 1988 Summer Olympics where China was sixth in the team final, and Fan finished 20th in the all-around final. Fan Di's final competition before retirement was the 1990 Asian Games. She won gold with her team and on the uneven bars.
