= Ruggero Rossato =

Italian gymnast

- Born: 27 June 1968 (age 58) Padua, Italy
- Height: 1.63 m (5 ft 4 in)

Gymnastics career
- Discipline: Men's artistic gymnastics
- Country represented: Italy
- Club: Pro Patria Milano

Ruggero Rossato (born 27 June 1968) is an Italian gymnast. He competed at the 1992 Summer Olympics where he placed 22nd in the individual all around and 5th with the Italian team in the team final.
