= Solveig Egman-Andersson =

Swedish artistic gymnast

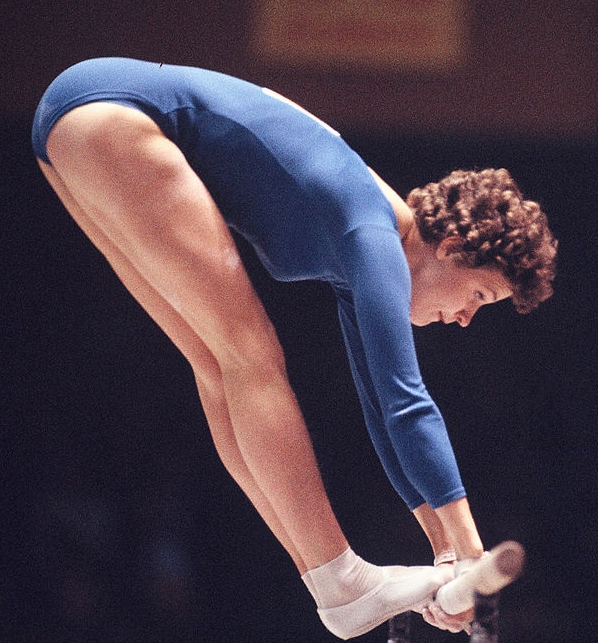
- Solveig Egman-Andersson at the 1964 Olympics

Personal information
- Nickname: Lillan
- Born: 6 January 1942 (age 84) Arvika, Värmland, Sweden
- Height: 1.68 m (5 ft 6 in)
- Weight: 59 kg (130 lb)

Sport
- Sport: Artistic gymnastics
- Club: Arvika GF
Medal record
Representing Sweden
European Championships
Gold medal – first place	1963 Paris	Vault
Silver medal – second place	1963 Paris	All-around
Silver medal – second place	1963 Paris	Floor
Bronze medal – third place	1963 Paris	Uneven bars

Laila Solveig Egman-Andersson (born 6 January 1942) is a retired Swedish artistic gymnast who competed at the 1960, 1964 and 1968 Summer Olympics. Her best individual achievement was 23rd place on the vault in 1964. She won four medals in five events at the 1963 European Championships.
