= Thea Belmer =

Dutch artistic gymnast

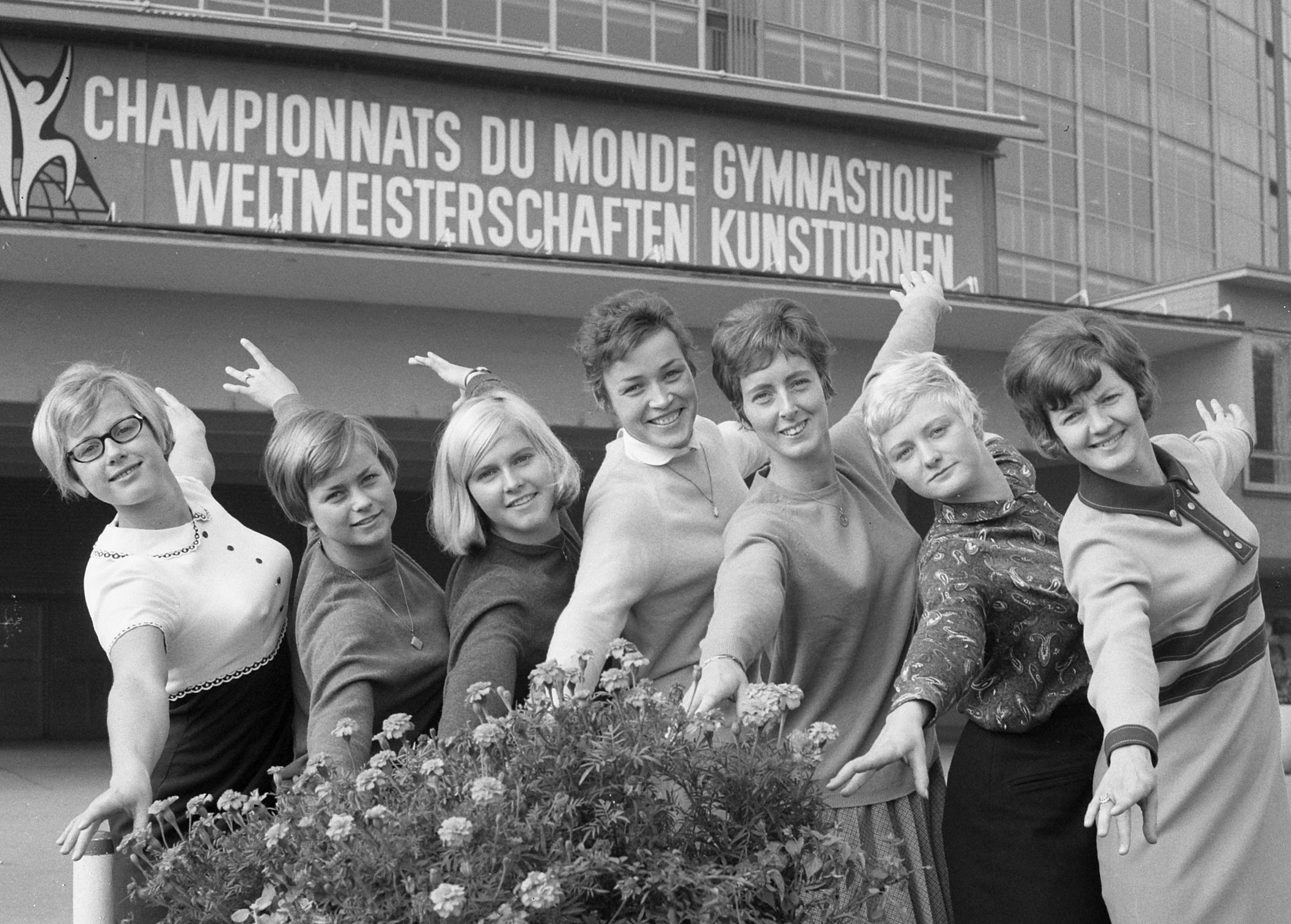
- Belmer (right) with her team mates at the World Championships in 1966 in Dortmund.

Personal information
- Born: 1941 (age 84–85) Amsterdam

Gymnastics career
- Discipline: Women's artistic gymnastics
- Country represented: Netherlands
- Club: KDO Amsterdam
- Retired: 1966
Medal record
Representing Netherlands
European Championships
Gold medal – first place	1963 Paris	Uneven Bars
Silver medal – second place	1963 Paris	Vault

Thea Belmer (born 1941, Amsterdam) is a former artistic gymnast.

Belmer had her most successful year in 1963, when in April she won a gold medal on uneven bars and a silver medal on vault at the 1963 European Championships and in December won the national championships. At the world championships in Dortmund in 1966, she was a member of the Dutch team, that came in 14th of 22 teams.

Belmer married Piet Uijtendaal on 9 December 1966 in Amsterdam, after which she retired from competitive gymnastics and moved to live in Wormer.
