= 1990 European Women's Artistic Gymnastics Championships =

18th European Women's Artistic Gymnastics Championships
- Location: Athens, Greece
- Dates: 6–9 May 1990

The 18th European Women's Artistic Gymnastics Championships was held in Athens, Greece from 6–9 May 1990. Svetlana Boginskaya won gold medals in all the individual events, becoming only the third European gymnast to accomplish this.

== Medalists ==
Event	Gold	Silver	Bronze
Seniors
All-around	Svetlana Boginskaya (URS)	Natalia Kalinina (URS)	Henrietta Ónodi (HUN)
Vault	Svetlana Boginskaya (URS)	Cristina Bontaș (ROM)	Eva Rueda (ESP)
Uneven bars	Svetlana Boginskaya (URS); Natalia Kalinina (URS); Mirela Pașca (ROM)	None awarded	None awarded
Balance beam	Svetlana Boginskaya (URS)	Natalia Kalinina (URS)	Maria Neculiță (ROM)
Floor	Svetlana Boginskaya (URS)	Tatiana Groshkova (URS)	Henrietta Ónodi (HUN); Milena Mavrodieva (BUL)

== Results ==
=== All-around ===
All gymnasts took part with no qualification round. The following is the top 20 of the individual all-around.

Position	Gymnast	Vault (gymnastics)	Uneven bars	Balance beam	Floor (gymnastics)	Total
1st place, gold medalist(s)	Svetlana Boginskaya (URS)	10.000	9.975	9.962	9.937	39.874
2nd place, silver medalist(s)	Natalia Kalinina (URS)	9.962	9.900	9.850	9.925	39.637
3rd place, bronze medalist(s)	Henrietta Ónodi (HUN)	9.862	9.950	9.912	9.912	39.636
4	Eva Rueda (ESP)	9.925	9.875	9.825	9.862	39.487
5	Mirela Pașca (ROM)	9.862	9.850	9.800	9.675	39.187
6	Maria Neculiță (ROM)	9.837	9.575	9.825	9.925	39.162
7	Cristina Bontaș (ROM)	9.887	9.887	9.425	9.925	39.124
8	Karine Mermet (FRA)	9.900	9.775	9.837	9.587	39.099
9	Iveta Poloková (TCH)	9.825	9.737	9.825	9.650	39.037
10	Tatiana Groshkova (URS)	9.912	9.862	9.362	9.900	39.036
11	Diana Schröder (GDR)	9.825	9.750	9.675	9.762	39.012
12	Karine Boucher (FRA)	9.812	9.762	9.750	9.662	38.986
13	Roberta Kirchmayer (ITA)	9.712	9.762	9.737	9.750	38.961
14	Eszter Óváry (HUN)	9.850	9.750	9.612	9.712	38.924
15	Milena Mavrodieva (BUL)	9.912	9.787	9.287	9.887	38.873
16	Fofo Varvariotou (GRE)	9.900	9.250	9.700	9.875	38.725
17	Alicia Fernández (ESP)	9.637	9.875	9.362	9.837	38.712
18	Andrea Molnár (HUN)	9.800	9.800	9.600	9.500	38.700
19	Maya Hristova (BUL)	9.862	9.862	9.325	9.650	38.699
20	Daniela Bartova (TCH)	9.712	9.700	9.625	9.537	38.574

=== Vault ===
Rank	Gymnast	Total
1st place, gold medalist(s)	Svetlana Boginskaya (URS)	9.943
2nd place, silver medalist(s)	Cristina Bontaș (ROM)	9.900
3rd place, bronze medalist(s)	Eva Rueda (ESP)	9.874
4	Natalia Kalinina (URS)	9.868
5	Karine Mermet (FRA)	9.856
6	Milena Mavrodieva (BUL)	9.843
7	Miroslava Jantekova (TCH)	9.768
8	Fofo Varvariotou (GRE)	9.481

=== Uneven bars ===
Rank	Gymnast	Total
1st place, gold medalist(s)	Svetlana Boginskaya (URS)	9.950
1st place, gold medalist(s)	Natalia Kalinina (URS)	9.950
1st place, gold medalist(s)	Mirela Pașca (ROM)	9.950
4	Alicia Fernandez (ESP)	9.887
5	Maya Hristova (BUL)	9.862
6	Eva Rueda (ESP)	9.825
7	Cristina Bontaș (ROM)	9.787
8	Henrietta Ónodi (HUN)	9.687

=== Balance beam ===
Rank	Gymnast	Total
1st place, gold medalist(s)	Svetlana Boginskaya (URS)	10.000
2nd place, silver medalist(s)	Natalia Kalinina (URS)	9.950
3rd place, bronze medalist(s)	Maria Neculiță (ROM)	9.875
4	Eva Rueda (ESP)	9.825
4	Barbel Wielgoss (GDR)	9.825
6	Karine Mermet (FRA)	9.800
7	Iveta Poloková (TCH)	9.787
8	Henrietta Ónodi (HUN)	9.637

=== Floor ===
Rank	Gymnast	Total
1st place, gold medalist(s)	Svetlana Boginskaya (URS)	10.000
2nd place, silver medalist(s)	Tatiana Groshkova (URS)	9.962
3rd place, bronze medalist(s)	Henrietta Ónodi (HUN)	9.925
3rd place, bronze medalist(s)	Milena Mavrodieva (BUL)	9.925
5	Maria Neculiță (ROM)	9.912
6	Fofo Varvariotou (GRE)	9.900
7	Cristina Bontaș (ROM)	9.837
8	Eva Rueda (ESP)	9.762
