= Im Hye-jin =

South Korean gymnast

Personal information
- Nationality: South Korean
- Born: 3 June 1973 (age 51)

Sport
- Sport: Gymnastics

Im Hye-jin (born 3 June 1973) is a South Korean gymnast. She competed in six events at the 1988 Summer Olympics.
