= Tereza Kočiš =

Serbian gymnast (born 1934)

- Full name: Tereza Kočiš
- Born: April 23, 1934 (age 92) Sombor, Kingdom of Yugoslavia

Gymnastics career
- Discipline: Women's artistic gymnastics
- Country represented: Yugoslavia
Medal record
Women's Gymnastics
Representing Yugoslavia
World Championship
Silver medal – second place	1950 Basel	Floor Exercise
European Championship
Silver medal – second place	1963 Paris	Balance beam
Silver medal – second place	1963 Paris	Uneven bars
Bronze medal – third place	1963 Paris	Floor Exercise

Tereza Kočiš (Serbian Cyrillic: Тереза Кочиш, born April 27, 1934, in Sombor) is a retired Serbian gymnast who competed for Yugoslavia.

She represented Yugoslavia at the 1952 and 1960 Summer Olympics.
