= Sónia Moura =

Portuguese gymnast (born 1972)

Personal information
- Nationality: Portuguese
- Born: 1 June 1972 (age 52)

Sport
- Sport: Gymnastics

Sónia Moura (born 1 June 1972) is a Portuguese gymnast. She competed in five events at the 1988 Summer Olympics.
