= Kim Nam-ok =

South Korean gymnast

Personal information
- Nationality: South Korean
- Born: 3 November 1972 (age 52)

Sport
- Sport: Gymnastics

Kim Nam-ok (born 3 November 1972) is a South Korean gymnast. She competed in six events at the 1988 Summer Olympics.
