= Aleftina Pryakhina =

Soviet artistic gymnast

- Born: 13 June 1972 (age 54) Ashgabat
- Height: 4 ft 7 in (140 cm)

Gymnastics career
- Discipline: Women's artistic gymnastics
- Country represented: Soviet Union
- Club: Central Army Sports Club
- Head coach: Mikhail Klimenko
Medal record
Representing Soviet Union
European Championships
Silver medal – second place	1987 Moscow	All-Around
Bronze medal – third place	1987 Moscow	Floor Exercise

Aleftina Pryakhina (Russian: Алевтина Пряхина) (born 13 June 1972) is a Soviet former artistic gymnast. At the 1987 European Championships, she won a silver medal in the all-around and a bronze medal on floor exercise. Pryakhina was an alternate for the Soviet team at the 1987 World Championships in Rotterdam. She was coached by Mikhail Klimenko.

== Selected competitive skills ==
Apparatus	Name	Description	Difficulty	Performed
Vault	Baitova	Yurchenko entry, laid out salto backwards with two twists	5.0	1986
Vault		Yurchenko entry with full twist on, laid out salto backwards with full twist	5.0	1987
Uneven Bars		Round off full twist mount over the low bar	D	1986-87
Uneven Bars	Morio	Double back tuck with a full twist dismount	D	1986-87
Balance Beam	Shishova	Back tuck with a full twist	F	1986-87
Balance Beam	Zamolodchikova	Round off full twist to hip circle mount	E	1986-87
Balance Beam		Double back tuck with a full twist dismount	G	1986-1987
Floor Exercise	Silivas	Double back tuck with two twists	H	1986-87

== Competitive history ==
Year	Event	Team	AA	VT	UB	BB	FX
Junior
1985	SKDA Championships				1st place, gold medalist(s)	1st place, gold medalist(s)	
Senior
1986	Chunichi Cup		3rd place, bronze medalist(s)	1st place, gold medalist(s)			1st place, gold medalist(s)
1986	Junior European Championships		3rd place, bronze medalist(s)	2nd place, silver medalist(s)	4		1st place, gold medalist(s)
1986	Riga International		1st place, gold medalist(s)		1st place, gold medalist(s)		
1986	Tokyo Cup			1st place, gold medalist(s)			1st place, gold medalist(s)
1987
1987	European Championships		2nd place, silver medalist(s)	7	4	6	3rd place, bronze medalist(s)
1987	Moscow News		4				
1987	USSR Championships		3rd place, bronze medalist(s)	8		5	
1987	USSR Cup		7				
1988	USSR Championships		8				
1988	USSR Cup		17				
1988	World Sports Fair		7		2nd place, silver medalist(s)		
1989	USSR Championships			8			
1989	USSR Cup		13				
