= Leanne Rycroft =

Australian gymnast

Personal information
- Nationality: Australian
- Born: 9 February 1969 (age 56)

Sport
- Sport: Gymnastics

Leanne Rycroft (born 9 February 1969) is an Australian gymnast. She competed in five events at the 1988 Summer Olympics.
