= Michaela Ustorf =

German gymnast

Personal information
- Nationality: German
- Born: 4 October 1972 (age 52); Kaufbeuren, Germany

Sport
- Sport: Gymnastics

Michaela Ustorf (born 4 October 1972) is a German gymnast. She competed in five events at the 1988 Summer Olympics.
