= Mieko Mori =

Japanese gymnast

Personal information
- Full name: 森美恵子 Mori Mieko
- Nationality: Japanese
- Born: 13 April 1966 (age 60)

Sport
- Sport: Gymnastics

Mieko Mori (森美恵子, Mori Mieko; born 13 April 1966) is a Japanese gymnast. She competed in six events at the 1988 Summer Olympics. Her achievement ranking is 3,715.
