= Yuriko Nanahara =

Japanese gymnast

Personal information
- Full name: 七原 由理子 Nanahara Yuriko
- Nationality: Japanese
- Born: 1 February 1972 (age 53)

Sport
- Sport: Gymnastics

Yuriko Nanahara (七原由理子, Nanahara Yuriko, born 1 February 1972) is a Japanese gymnast. She competed in six events at the 1988 Summer Olympics.
