= Isabella von Lospichl =

German gymnast

Personal information
- Nationality: German
- Born: 28 August 1970 (age 54); Starnberg, Germany

Sport
- Sport: Gymnastics

Isabella von Lospichl (born 28 August 1970) is a German former gymnast. She competed in five events at the 1988 Summer Olympics.
