= Olesya Dudnik =

Ukrainian gymnast (born 1974)

- Full name: Olesya Vitalyevna Dudnik
- Born: August 15, 1974 (age 52) Zaporizhia, Ukraine

Gymnastics career
- Discipline: Women's artistic gymnastics
- Country represented: Soviet Union
Medal record
World Championships
Gold medal – first place	1989 Stuttgart	Team
Gold medal – first place	1989 Stuttgart	Vault
Silver medal – second place	1989 Stuttgart	Balance Beam
European Championships
Gold medal – first place	1989 Brussels	Balance Beam

Olesya [alternate spelling Olessia] Dudnik (Олеся Віталіївна Дудник; born August 15, 1974, in Zaporizhia, Ukraine) is a gymnastics coach and former artistic gymnast who competed internationally for the Soviet Union between 1988 and 1990. She was the world champion on the vault in 1989 and is regarded as one of the greatest gymnasts ever on the balance beam. Her brief competitive career was ended by injuries.

== Career ==
Dudnik began gymnastics after seeing another girl practice and asking her mother for lessons.

When her athletic potential was discovered, Dudnik was sent to train at club Dynamo in Kropyvnytskyi. She was moderately successful in international junior meets. Her breakout performance came at the 1989 American Cup in Fort Worth, Texas, where she finished second in the individual all-around competition. She collided with a Japanese gymnast during warm-ups for the floor exercise.

At the 1989 World Championships held in Stuttgart, Germany, Dudnik was a member of the gold medal-winning Soviet team, led by Svetlana Boginskaya and considered one of the most powerful women's line-ups ever assembled. The team was so deep with talent that Dudnik did not qualify for the individual all-around competition due to a large error in her compulsory uneven bar routine. However, in the event finals she won the gold medal on the vault. Though she was considered the favorite to win beam and had recorded a perfect 10.0 for her optional routine, Dudnik had a large stumble on her dismount. Nevertheless, the judges recognized the extreme and unprecedented difficulty of the routine, and she captured the silver medal. She also placed fourth in the floor exercise. She scored four perfect 10.0's during the competition.

Dudnik's gymnastics were a combination of artistic elegance and daring athleticism. In the vaulting event, she routinely stuck a double-twisting Yurchenko vault, which was rarely seen in those times. Her uneven bar routine included an Arabian tuck mount. Her balance beam routine included an aerial cartwheel to two layout step outs, a nearly laid-out full twisting somersault, and an exceptionally difficult round-off, flip-flop, triple-twisting dismount. Moreover, Dudnik rarely had balance errors on any of these elements. Her beam routine was so difficult that it would actually be worth a 9.9 under the 2001–2005 Code of Points, and a 6.4 under the 2009-2012 COP, even though the routine was not constructed to meet these guidelines.

Video footage from the World Championships shows Dudnik performing with a bandaged right foot. The foot injury continued to nag her through the 1990 French Internationals. Before the injury, Dudnik's floor routine consisted of an Arabian double front, a 2 1/2 twist to punch barani, and a full-in pike dismount. Later, she sustained a serious knee injury, and difficulties with rehabilitation brought her competitive career to an end.

== Personal ==
In addition to injuries, Dudnik has endured personal tragedies. Her parents died of illnesses they suffered in the aftermath of the Chernobyl nuclear disaster. In March 1994 she married Ukrainian wrestler Oleh Chapnyi, and the couple had a son born in 1995. International Gymnast magazine reported that Chapny, however, died in 2004.

Olesya Dudnik coached gymnastics at the Al Gezeera Sporting Club in Cairo, Egypt until 2017. She remarried in 2017 and currently resides in Redondo Beach, CA.

== Selected competitive skills ==
Apparatus	Name	Description	Difficulty
Vault	Baitova	Yurchenko entry, double twist off	5.0
Uneven Bars		Round off Arabian (half twist to front tuck) mount over low bar	F
Balance Beam		Back layout with a full twist	G
Balance Beam		Back layout dismount with three twists	F
Floor Exercise		Tucked Arabian double front (half twist to double front tuck)	E

== Competitive history ==
Year	Event	Team	AA	VT	UB	BB	FX
1988	Junior Friendship Tournament	1st place, gold medalist(s)	2nd place, silver medalist(s)		2nd place, silver medalist(s)	1st place, gold medalist(s)	1st place, gold medalist(s)
1988	Jr. USSR-GDR Dual Meet	1st place, gold medalist(s)	4				
1988	II All-Union Summer Games for Youth		1st place, gold medalist(s)				
1989	McDonald's American Cup		2nd place, silver medalist(s)				
1989	European Championships		6			1st place, gold medalist(s)	
1989	International Mixed Pairs	2nd place, silver medalist(s)					
1989	USSR Championships	1st place, gold medalist(s)	2nd place, silver medalist(s)				
1989	World Championships	1st place, gold medalist(s)		1st place, gold medalist(s)		2nd place, silver medalist(s)	4
1990	French International					1st place, gold medalist(s)	
1990	USSR Championships	2nd place, silver medalist(s)	7				
