= 1963 European Women's Artistic Gymnastics Championships =

4th European Women's Artistic Gymnastics Championships
- Location: Paris, France
- Dates: 20–28 April 1963

The 4th European Women's Artistic Gymnastics Championships were held in Paris. These were the first European Championships to be held in a non-Eastern Bloc country. Out of concerns that East Germany would be excluded, the competition was boycotted by Bulgaria, Czechoslovakia, Hungary, Poland, Romania, and the Soviet Union.

== Medalists ==
All three medaling countries won their first European Championship medals at this competition.

Event	Gold	Silver	Bronze
All-around	Mirjana Bilić (YUG)	Solveig Egman (SWE)	Ewa Rydell (SWE)
Vault	Solveig Egman (SWE)	Thea Belmer (NED)	Jannie Vierstra (NED)
Uneven bars	Thea Belmer (NED)	Tereza Kočiš (YUG)	Solveig Egman (SWE)
Balance beam	Ewa Rydell (SWE)	Tereza Kočiš (YUG)	Mirjana Bilić (YUG)
Floor	Mirjana Bilić (YUG)	Solveig Egman (SWE)	Tereza Kočiš (YUG)

== Results ==
=== All-around ===
Rank	Gymnast	Vault (gymnastics)	Uneven bars	Balance beam	Floor (gymnastics)	Total
1st place, gold medalist(s)	Mirjana Bilić (YUG)	9.333	9.333	9.100	9.466	37.232
2nd place, silver medalist(s)	Solveig Egman (SWE)	9.566	9.266	8.933	9.366	37.131
3rd place, bronze medalist(s)	Ewa Rydell (SWE)	9.300	8.966	9.500	9.200	36.966
4	Tereza Kočiš (YUG)	9.066	9.333	9.100	9.366	36.865

=== Vault ===
Rank	Gymnast	Score
1st place, gold medalist(s)	Solveig Egman (SWE)	19.032
2nd place, silver medalist(s)	Thea Belmer (NED)	18.799
3rd place, bronze medalist(s)	Jannie Vierstra (NED)	18.732
4	Mirjana Bilić (YUG)	18.633
5	Ewa Rydell (SWE)	18.566
6	Denise Goddard (GBR)	18.333

=== Uneven bars ===
Rank	Gymnast	Score
1st place, gold medalist(s)	Thea Belmer (NED)	18.766
2nd place, silver medalist(s)	Tereza Kočiš (YUG)	18.733
3rd place, bronze medalist(s)	Solveig Egman (SWE)	18.566
4	Annie Ange (FRA)	18.399
5	Marjana Bilic (YUG)	17.699
6	Jacqueline Dieudonné (FRA)	17.366

=== Balance beam ===
Rank	Gymnast	Score
1st place, gold medalist(s)	Ewa Rydell (SWE)	19.033
2nd place, silver medalist(s)	Tereza Kočiš (YUG)	18.500
3rd place, bronze medalist(s)	Mirjana Bilić (YUG)	18.400
4	Jacqueline Dieudonné (FRA)	18.366

=== Floor ===
Rank	Gymnast	Score
1st place, gold medalist(s)	Mirjana Bilić (YUG)	18.932
2nd place, silver medalist(s)	Solveig Egman (SWE)	18.899
3rd place, bronze medalist(s)	Tereza Kočiš (YUG)	18.766
4	Annie Ange (FRA)	18.633
5	Ewa Rydell (SWE)	18.600
6	Denise Goddard (GBR)	18.466
