= Foteini Varvariotou =

Greek gymnast (born 1973)

Personal information
- Nationality: Greek
- Born: 11 June 1973 (age 53) Thessaloniki, Greece

Sport
- Sport: Gymnastics

Foteini Varvariotou (born 11 June 1973) is a Greek former artistic gymnast. She competed in five events at the 1988 Summer Olympics.

== Early life ==
Vararioutou's parents were bakers, and she was the second child in the family. Her younger sister also participated in gymnastics.

== Career ==
Varvariotou began gymnastics in 1980 and became a member of the national team in 1985. She won the Greek national championships in 1987.

She was the only Greek women's gymnast at the 1988 Summer Olympics and set a new Greek record for her all-around score.

At the 1990 European Championships, held in Athens, she placed 16th in the all-around after falling from the uneven bars. In the vault final, she did well on her first vault but fell on the second. She also qualified for the floor exercise final, where she performed to "Never on Sunday" and placed 6th.
