= Olga Strazheva =

Soviet artistic gymnast (born 1972)

- Born: 12 November 1972 (age 53) Zaporizhia, Ukrainian SSR, USSR
- Height: 1.52 m (5 ft 0 in)

Gymnastics career
- Discipline: Women's artistic gymnastics
- Club: Trud Zaporizhia
Medal record
Representing the Soviet Union
Olympic Games
| Gold medal – first place | 1988 Seoul | Team |
World Championships
| Gold medal – first place | 1989 Stuttgart | Team |
| Bronze medal – third place | 1989 Stuttgart | All-around |
| Bronze medal – third place | 1989 Stuttgart | Uneven bars |
European Championships
| Silver medal – second place | 1989 Brussels | Uneven bars |
| Bronze medal – third place | 1989 Brussels | All-around |
Goodwill Games
| Gold medal – first place | 1986 Moscow | Team |

Olga Vladimirovna Strazheva (Russian: Ольга Владимировна Стражева; Ukrainian: Ольга Володимирівна Стражева; born 12 November 1972) is a retired gymnast from Ukraine who won world and Olympic gold medals for the Soviet Union.

She competed at the 1988 Summer Olympics. In the optional team final, she suffered a torn ACL on the balance beam and therefore was unable to compete on the final event, floor exercise, or attend the gold medal ceremony.

She won another gold with the Soviet team at the 1989 World Artistic Gymnastics Championships, along with two individual bronze medals. The same year she collected two more individual medals at the European championships. She is the first female gymnast to perform a double frontal salto on the floor.

She retired in 1990 due to injuries and later joined a circus company in Germany. She married twice, the second time in 2008 to Ivan Vanyuk, a colleague from the university where she teaches physical education.
