= Eszter Óváry =

Hungarian gymnast (born 1972)

Personal information
- Nationality: Hungarian
- Born: 11 October 1972 (age 52); Budapest, Hungary

Sport
- Sport: Gymnastics

Eszter Óváry (born 11 October 1972) is a Hungarian gymnast. She competed at the 1988 Summer Olympics and the 1996 Summer Olympics.

== Competitive history ==
Year	Event	Team	AA	VT	UB	BB	FX
Junior
1985	Hungarian Junior Championships		5				
Senior
1987	AUT-HUN Dual Meet	1st place, gold medalist(s)		1st place, gold medalist(s)			
1987	Belgian Gym Masters		2nd place, silver medalist(s)	1st place, gold medalist(s)		2nd place, silver medalist(s)	1st place, gold medalist(s)
1987	Budapest Junior Championships		2nd place, silver medalist(s)	3rd place, bronze medalist(s)	3rd place, bronze medalist(s)		2nd place, silver medalist(s)
1987	Junior Friendship Tournament	4		6			
1987	Hungarian Junior Championships		1st place, gold medalist(s)	1st place, gold medalist(s)	3rd place, bronze medalist(s)	2nd place, silver medalist(s)	1st place, gold medalist(s)
1987	World Championships	7	31				
1988	DTB Cup		8				
1988	European Cup		6	3rd place, bronze medalist(s)	5		4
1988	FRA-HUN Dual Meet	1st place, gold medalist(s)	4				
1988	Gander Memorial		11				
1988	Hungarian International		4	3rd place, bronze medalist(s)			3rd place, bronze medalist(s)
1988	Kosice Cup		5				
1988	Swiss Cup	5					
1988	Olympic Games	8	19				
1989	Blume Memorial		5				
1989	World Championships	9	26				
1990	Budapest Championships		2nd place, silver medalist(s)				
1990	Catania Cup		1st place, gold medalist(s)				
1990	European Championships		14				
1990	Hungarian Championships		4			3rd place, bronze medalist(s)	
1990	Mixed Pairs	16					
1990	Moscow News		14				
1991	Chunichi Cup		10				
1991	Moscow World Stars		34				
1991	SUI-HUN-HOL Tri-Meet	1st place, gold medalist(s)	2nd place, silver medalist(s)				
1991	Tokyo Cup			4		5	
1991	World Championships	8					
1992	Hungarian Championships		5				
1992	HUN-FRA Dual Meet		12				
1992	Hungarian International		12				
1994
1994	World Team Championships	11					
1995	Catania Cup		13				
1995	Hungarian International		6				
1995	Summer Universiade	7	9	1st place, gold medalist(s)			2nd place, silver medalist(s)
1995	World Championships	9					
1996
1996	Olympic Games	9					
