= Mauricette Geller =

Belgian gymnast (born 1973)

Personal information
- Nationality: Belgian
- Born: 28 March 1973 (age 51); Liège, Belgium

Sport
- Sport: Gymnastics

Mauricette Geller (born 28 March 1973) is a Belgian gymnast. She competed in five events at the 1988 Summer Olympics.
