= Beáta Storczer =

Hungarian gymnast

Personal information
- Nationality: Hungarian
- Born: 10 July 1969 (age 55); Budapest, Hungary

Sport
- Sport: Gymnastics

Beáta Storczer (born 10 July 1969) is a Hungarian gymnast. She competed in six events at the 1988 Summer Olympics.
