= Brandy Johnson =

American gymnast (born 1973)

- Full name: Brandy K. Johnson-Scharpf
- Born: April 30, 1973 (age 53) Tallahassee, Florida, U.S.

Gymnastics career
- Discipline: Women's artistic gymnastics
- Country represented: United States
Medal record
World Championships
Silver medal – second place	1989 Stuttgart	Vault

Brandy K. Johnson-Scharpf (born April 30, 1973, in Tallahassee, Florida) is a retired American gymnast, gymnastics judge, stuntwoman and gymnastics coach. She owns Brandy Johnson's Global Gymnastics in Clermont, Florida.

== Gymnastics career ==
Johnson began gymnastics at age 6; her doctors recommended it to her parents to strengthen her core muscles after she had surgery.

A member of Brown's Gymnastics club in Orlando, Florida, Johnson made an impressive debut in high-level competition, winning the all-around, vault, floor exercise and balance beam titles at the 1986 Junior Olympics National Championships. The following year, in her first US National Championships, Johnson won the all-around gold medal in the junior division. She also received her first international assignment, the Chunichi Cup in Japan, where she achieved a twelfth-place finish.

During the buildup to the 1988 Olympics, after she won bronze at the 1988 American Cup, Johnson moved to Houston, Texas, to be coached by Marta and Béla Károlyi. She placed sixth at the 1988 US Nationals and fourth at the Olympic Trials, securing a berth on the US team for the 1988 Olympics in Seoul. At the Olympics, Johnson's tenth-place all-around finish was the highest for an American gymnast in the meet. She qualified for an event final on the vault, for which she placed fifth, and she was the alternate for the uneven bars final. Johnson said she was proud of her uneven bars score as she had historically struggled on the event. She, Kelly Garrison-Steves, and Phoebe Mills were the only U.S. women to qualify for an individual event final.

Johnson opted to continue competing in 1989, returning to Brown's. It was a successful year for her, as she nearly swept the US National Championships, winning the all-around title and every event final, with the sole exception of uneven bars. She also achieved outstanding results as a member of the fourth-place US team at the 1989 World Artistic Gymnastics Championships, coming in second on the vault and seventh in the all-around. Her AA placement was, at the time, the highest ever achieved by an American woman at Worlds. Her silver medal was the only one for an American gymnast in the competition. For her contributions to gymnastics in 1989, Johnson was nominated for the James E. Sullivan Award.

Johnson competed well in 1990, placing third in the all-around and winning vault and floor gold at the US Nationals and winning the Olympic Festival AA. She placed 5th AA in the 1990 World cup and was an event finalist on bars, beam, and floor. However, it also marked her last year of elite competition.

Johnson did not qualify for the 1990 Goodwill Games, and refused when USGF asked her to attend as an alternate. When Erica Stokes was unable to compete after sustaining an injury, the USGF asked Johnson to replace her. Johnson refused a second time because she was about to have surgery to remove a screw in one of her toes from a prior injury. The USGF has said that Johnson accused her former coach Bela Károlyi of concealing Stokes' injury to keep Johnson out of the competition.

== Post-gymnastics career ==
After retiring from elite gymnastics in 1990, Johnson worked for several years as a stunt double in Hollywood movies, including Bean, the film adaptation of the British television comedy Mr. Bean. She is now married, has one child (her daughter Sydney, who also competes in gymnastics), and is the owner of Brandy Johnson's Global Gymnastics in Clermont, Florida. Johnson also remains involved in the sport as a judge. In 2000, she was inducted into the USA Gymnastics Hall of Fame.
