= Wang Wenjing (gymnast) =

Chinese gymnast

Personal information
- Nationality: Chinese
- Born: 14 July 1973 (age 52)

Sport
- Sport: Gymnastics

Wang Wenjing (born 14 July 1973) is a Chinese gymnast. She competed at the 1988 Summer Olympics where she placed sixth with the Chinese team and thirty second in the individual all around.
