= Natalia Lashchenova =

Soviet gymnast

Natalia Laschenova
- Born: September 16, 1973 (age 52)

Gymnastics career
- Discipline: Women's artistic gymnastics
- Country represented: Soviet Union
- Club: Dynamo Riga
Medal record
Representing Soviet Union
Olympic Games
Gold medal – first place	1988 Seoul	Team
World Championships
Gold medal – first place	1989 Stuttgart	Team
Silver medal – second place	1989 Stuttgart	All-Around

Natalia Vasiliyevna Laschenova (Russian: Наталья Васильевна Лащёнова) (born September 16, 1973 in Jelgava, Latvian SSR, Soviet Union) is a retired Soviet gymnast. Laschenova competed at the 1988 Summer Olympics and the 1989 World Artistic Gymnastics Championships. Laschenova is best known for her difficult skills, deceptive power, strong technique and highly expressive dance.

== Early career ==
Laschenova had started gymnastics at the age of 6, reaching the international gymnastics scene at age 12 with her first competition, the 1985 Riga International. Laschenova did well, placing 2nd in the all around, 2nd on vault and 1st on balance beam. Laschenova continued to compete internationally at the 1986 Belgian Gym Masters, 1986 Moscow News and 1987 US vs USSR.

== 1988-1989 ==
Laschenova competed at the 1988 Summer Olympics, contributing to a team gold medal for the Soviet Union and placing 5th in the all around. The following year she competed at the 1989 World Artistic Gymnastics Championships, where she won a silver medal in the all around along with a gold medal with the team.

== Post 1989 ==
Laschenova was hampered in 1990 by an injury. After the breakup of the Soviet Union, Latvia did not compete with most of the former Soviet states as the Unified Team meaning that Laschenova would be unable to make the 1992 Summer Olympics. She retired in 1991.

== Recent news ==
In 2010 it was reported that Laschenova and her family were facing deportation from the United States, where she now lives in Marysville, Ohio and coaches in Mason, Ohio.

== Competitive history ==
Year	Event	Team	AA	VT	UB	BB	FX
Junior
1985	Riga International		3rd place, bronze medalist(s)	2nd place, silver medalist(s)		1st place, gold medalist(s)	
1986	Belgian Gym Masters		1st place, gold medalist(s)	1st place, gold medalist(s)	1st place, gold medalist(s)	2nd place, silver medalist(s)	1st place, gold medalist(s)
1986	Junior Friendship Tournament	1st place, gold medalist(s)	3rd place, bronze medalist(s)	1st place, gold medalist(s)		1st place, gold medalist(s)	2nd place, silver medalist(s)
1986	Moscow News		4	2nd place, silver medalist(s)			1st place, gold medalist(s)
1986	Riga International		2nd place, silver medalist(s)				1st place, gold medalist(s)
1986	Riga-Rostock Dual Meet	1st place, gold medalist(s)	1st place, gold medalist(s)	1st place, gold medalist(s)			1st place, gold medalist(s)
1986	USSR Spartikade			2nd place, silver medalist(s)			
Senior
1987	Kraft International		8	1st place, gold medalist(s)			
1987	Riga International		3rd place, bronze medalist(s)				
1987	USA-USSR Dual Meet	1st place, gold medalist(s)	2nd place, silver medalist(s)				
1987	USSR Championships		5				
1988	DTB Cup		4	4	5		3rd place, bronze medalist(s)
1988	European Cup		3rd place, bronze medalist(s)		1st place, gold medalist(s)	3rd place, bronze medalist(s)	
1988	Golden Sands International		1st place, gold medalist(s)				
1988	Hungarian International		2nd place, silver medalist(s)	1st place, gold medalist(s)	2nd place, silver medalist(s)	2nd place, silver medalist(s)	1st place, gold medalist(s)
1988	Kosice Cup		1st place, gold medalist(s)				
1988	USA-USSR Dual Meet	1st place, gold medalist(s)	7				
1988	USSR Cup		3				
1988	Olympic Games	1st place, gold medalist(s)	5				
1989	Chunichi Cup		1st place, gold medalist(s)				
1989	DTB Cup		2nd place, silver medalist(s)	1st place, gold medalist(s)		1st place, gold medalist(s)	2nd place, silver medalist(s)
1989	Joachim Blume Memorial		2nd place, silver medalist(s)				
1989	Konica Cup		1st place, gold medalist(s)	1st place, gold medalist(s)	2nd place, silver medalist(s)	3rd place, bronze medalist(s)	1st place, gold medalist(s)
1989	Moscow News		5				
1989	Tokyo Cup			1st place, gold medalist(s)		2nd place, silver medalist(s)	
1989	USSR Championships		1st place, gold medalist(s)				
1989	USSR Cup		9				
1989	World Championships	1st place, gold medalist(s)	2nd place, silver medalist(s)	4			
1990	DTB Cup		3rd place, bronze medalist(s)	5	5	1st place, gold medalist(s)	4
1990	Gander Memorial		1st place, gold medalist(s)				
1990	Moscow News		1st place, gold medalist(s)				1st place, gold medalist(s)
1990	Swiss Cup	1st place, gold medalist(s)					
1990	USA-USSR Dual Meet	1st place, gold medalist(s)	3rd place, bronze medalist(s)				
1991	University Games	2nd place, silver medalist(s)	5	2nd place, silver medalist(s)		2nd place, silver medalist(s)	1st place, gold medalist(s)
1991	World Sports Fair		5	2nd place, silver medalist(s)	5		8

== See also ==
- List of select Jewish gymnasts
