= 1981 World Artistic Gymnastics Championships =

Gymnastics competition

- Location: (Soviet Union) Moscow, USSR

The 21st Artistic Gymnastics World Championships were held in Moscow, the capital of the USSR, in November 1981. The championships were originally meant to be hosted in Mexico City, but financial difficulties caused Mexico to withdraw as hosts in March of that year. The event was given to the Soviet Union instead.

== Medal winners ==
Event	Gold	Silver	Bronze
Men
Team all-around	Soviet Union; Yuri Korolev; Bogdan Makuts; Alexander Dityatin; Aleksandr Tkachyov; Artur Akopyan; Pavel Sut	Japan; Nobuyuki Kajitani; Koji Gushiken; Koji Sotomura; Kiyoshi Goto; Kyoji Yamawaki; Toshiro Kanai	China; Tong Fei; Li Ning; Li Xiaoping; Huang Yubin; Peng Yaping; Li Yuejiu
Individual all-around	(Soviet Union) Yuri Korolev	(Soviet Union) Bogdan Makuts	(Japan) Koji Gushiken
Floor	(China) Li Yuejiu (Soviet Union) Yuri Korolev	none awarded	(Japan) Koji Gushiken
Pommel horse	(China) Li Xiaoping (East Germany) Michael Nikolay	none awarded	(Hungary) György Guczoghy (Soviet Union) Yuri Korolev
Rings	(Soviet Union) Alexander Dityatin	(China) Huang Yubin	(Soviet Union) Bogdan Makuts
Vault	(East Germany) Ralf-Peter Hemman	(Soviet Union) Artur Akopyan	(Soviet Union) Bogdan Makuts
Parallel bars	(Japan) Koji Gushiken (Soviet Union) Alexander Dityatin	none awarded	(Japan) Nobuyuki Kajitani
Horizontal bar	(Soviet Union) Aleksandr Tkachyov	(West Germany) Eberhard Gienger (Soviet Union) Artur Akopyan	none awarded
Women
Team all-around	Soviet Union; Elena Davydova; Olga Bicherova; Maria Filatova; Stella Zakharova; Elena Polevaya; Natalia Ilienko	China; Ma Yanhong; Chen Yongyan; Zhu Zheng; Wu Jiani; Wen Jia; Li Cuiling	East Germany; Steffi Kräker; Annett Lindner; Birgit Senff; Kerstin Jacobs; Franka Voigt; Maxi Gnauck
Individual all-around	(Soviet Union) Olga Bicherova	(Soviet Union) Maria Filatova	(Soviet Union) Elena Davydova
Vault	(East Germany) Maxi Gnauck	(Soviet Union) Stella Zakharova	(East Germany) Steffi Kräker
Uneven bars	(East Germany) Maxi Gnauck	(China) Ma Yanhong	(Soviet Union) Elena Davydova (United States) Julianne McNamara
Balance beam	(East Germany) Maxi Gnauck	(China) Chen Yongyan	(United States) Tracee Talavera (China) Wu Jiani
Floor	(Soviet Union) Natalia Ilienko	(Soviet Union) Elena Davydova	(Bulgaria) Zoja Grantcharova

== Men ==
=== Team final ===
Rank	Team	Floor		Pommel horse		Rings		Vault		Parallel bars		Horizontal bar		Total
Rank	Team	C	O	C	O	C	O	C	O	C	O	C	O	Total
Gold medal	Soviet Union	97.300		98.350		97.800		98.350		98.600		98.550		588.950
Gold medal	Yuri Korolev	9.850	9.900	9.850	9.900	9.800	9.700	9.900	9.800	9.850	9.900	9.750	9.900	118.050
Gold medal	Bogdan Makuts	9.650	9.800	9.850	9.800	9.700	9.800	9.900	9.900	9.900	9.950	9.750	9.900	117.900
Gold medal	Alexander Dityatin	9.550	9.650	9.900	9.800	9.850	9.900	9.750	9.800	9.950	9.900	9.800	9.900	117.750
Gold medal	Aleksandr Tkachyov	9.700	9.800	9.800	9.850	9.800	9.700	9.700	9.800	9.900	9.800	9.800	10.000	117.650
Gold medal	Artur Akopyan	9.550	9.750	9.800	9.800	9.650	9.800	9.900	9.900	9.700	9.800	9.750	10.000	117.400
Gold medal	Pavel Sut	9.600	9.700	9.800	9.750	9.600	9.800	9.700	9.700	9.700	9.800	9.700	9.550	116.400
Silver medal	Japan	97.300		97.750		97.150		97.500		98.500		97.650		585.850
Silver medal	Nobuyuki Kajitani	9.800	9.750	9.750	9.750	9.700	9.900	9.750	9.800	9.900	9.900	9.650	9.850	117.500
Silver medal	Koji Gushiken	9.900	9.800	9.900	9.900	9.250	9.850	9.450	9.900	9.950	9.900	9.800	9.850	117.450
Silver medal	Koji Sotomura	9.750	9.600	9.750	9.850	9.600	9.800	9.700	9.800	9.750	9.900	9.550	9.700	116.750
Silver medal	Kiyoshi Goto	9.500	9.600	9.800	9.900	9.450	9.650	9.600	9.700	9.800	9.800	9.700	9.950	116.450
Silver medal	Kyoji Yamawaki	9.700	9.800	9.700	9.300	9.600	9.850	9.650	9.850	9.600	9.900	9.600	9.850	116.400
Silver medal	Toshiro Kanai	9.600	9.600	9.800	9.350	9.650	9.750	9.600	9.850	9.700	9.650	9.600	9.800	115.950
Bronze medal	China	96.700		97.250		97.700		97.250		97.350		97.650		583.900
Bronze medal	Tong Fei	9.400	9.900	9.800	9.800	9.700	9.950	9.750	9.800	9.850	9.900	9.750	10.000	117.600
Bronze medal	Li Ning	9.500	9.700	9.850	9.800	9.550	9.850	9.850	9.600	9.650	9.850	9.800	9.900	116.900
Bronze medal	Li Xiaoping	9.400	9.700	9.900	9.900	9.650	9.800	9.700	9.550	9.500	9.850	9.500	9.800	116.250
Bronze medal	Huang Yubin	9.350	9.700	9.750	9.750	9.750	9.950	9.600	9.650	9.250	9.800	9.650	9.700	115.900
Bronze medal	Peng Yaping	9.750	9.600	9.500	9.200	9.650	9.850	9.550	9.700	9.750	9.600	9.550	9.850	115.500
Bronze medal	Li Yuejiu	9.700	9.950	9.000	8.900	9.550	9.800	9.850	9.750	9.300	9.900	9.600	9.750	115.050
4	East Germany	96.350		97.500		96.750		98.150		97.600		97.400		583.750
4	Michael Nikolay	9.600	9.700	9.850	9.950	9.550	9.750	9.800	9.800	9.750	9.900	9.750	9.900	117.300
4	Roland Brückner	9.400	9.850	9.750	9.800	9.700	9.800	9.750	9.750	9.800	9.700	9.500	9.850	116.650
4	Jurgen Nikolay	9.600	9.700	9.700	9.450	9.400	9.700	9.750	9.850	9.850	9.800	9.750	9.900	116.450
4	Ralf-Peter Hemmann	9.400	9.550	9.500	9.650	9.650	9.800	9.900	9.850	9.700	9.750	9.550	9.800	116.200
4	Andreas Bronst	9.700	9.650	9.750	9.800	9.450	9.700	9.500	9.600	9.500	9.850	9.700	9.350	115.550
4	Bernd Jensch	9.450	9.700	9.550	9.700	9.650	9.700	9.800	9.800	9.450	9.450	9.400	9.700	115.350
5	United States	95.550		97.150		96.400		96.400		95.800		96.000		577.300
5	Bart Conner	9.600	9.700	9.800	9.800	9.600	9.800	9.700	9.750	9.650	9.750	9.600	9.750	116.500
5	Peter Vidmar	9.550	9.600	9.750	9.800	9.500	9.800	9.650	9.650	9.550	9.650	9.500	9.800	115.800
5	Jim Hartung	9.500	9.700	9.800	9.750	9.600	9.850	9.800	9.800	9.300	9.500	9.450	9.700	115.750
5	Scott Johnson	9.250	9.600	9.650	9.600	9.300	9.700	9.600	9.500	9.300	9.650	9.350	9.650	114.150
5	Phil Cahoy	9.100	9.450	9.750	9.400	9.200	9.600	9.400	9.500	9.650	9.700	9.500	9.700	113.950
5	Tim Daggett	9.450	9.600	9.550	9.450	9.500	9.750	7.500	9.550	9.400	9.500	9.300	9.600	112.150
6	West Germany	94.500		95.150		96.300		96.750		96.850		96.550		576.100
6	Jurgen Geiger	9.400	9.700	9.750	9.350	9.500	9.800	9.700	9.800	9.700	9.700	9.650	9.700	115.750
6	Eberhard Gienger	9.050	9.450	9.650	9.500	9.600	9.700	9.550	9.250	9.750	9.900	9.850	9.900	114.950
6	Volker Rohrwick	9.300	9.450	9.400	9.550	9.600	9.850	9.650	9.550	9.450	9.700	9.500	9.600	114.800
6	Benno Gross	9.200	9.350	9.750	9.750	9.450	9.650	9.500	9.700	9.650	9.500	9.450	9.600	114.550
6	Edgar Jorek	9.350	9.650	8.850	9.550	9.600	9.750	9.750	9.900	9.350	9.700	9.350	9.550	114.350
6	Daniel Winkler	9.450	9.550	8.900	9.100	9.300	9.550	9.450	9.650	9.500	9.600	9.550	9.750	113.350
7	France	93.150		96.800		95.350		96.900		95.300		95.750		573.250
7	Jean Luc Cairon	9.500	9.700	9.750	9.750	9.400	9.500	9.800	9.800	9.350	9.650	9.450	9.750	115.400
7	Laurent Barbieri	9.200	9.650	9.550	9.500	9.450	9.550	9.800	9.800	9.350	9.400	9.550	9.600	114.400
7	Michel Boutard	9.300	9.500	9.800	9.600	9.500	9.700	9.800	9.000	9.650	9.250	9.450	9.400	114.150
7	Willi Moy	8.450	9.400	9.600	9.550	9.700	9.800	9.750	9.650	9.500	9.750	9.350	8.900	113.400
7	Joel Suty	8.900	9.350	9.650	9.600	9.250	9.150	9.600	9.500	9.450	9.700	9.600	9.600	113.350
7	Jacques Def	8.650	9.150	9.650	9.650	9.350	9.400	9.400	9.400	9.200	9.500	9.650	9.700	112.700

=== All-around ===
Rank	Gymnast	Floor (gymnastics)	Pommel horse	Rings (gymnastics)	Vault (gymnastics)	Parallel bars	Horizontal bar	Score	Prelim score	Total
1st place, gold medalist(s)	Yuri Korolev (URS)	9.900	9.950	9.900	9.900	9.800	9.900	59.350	59.025	118.375
2nd place, silver medalist(s)	Bogdan Makuts (URS)	9.900	9.900	9.900	9.800	9.900	10.000	59.400	58.950	118.350
3rd place, bronze medalist(s)	Koji Gushiken (JPN)	9.800	9.900	9.900	9.900	9.900	9.850	59.250	58.725	117.975
4	Tong Fei (CHN)	9.700	9.600	9.900	9.900	9.800	10.000	58.900	58.800	117.700
5	Roland Brückner (GDR)	9.900	9.800	9.900	9.750	9.750	9.900	59.000	58.325	117.325
6	Li Ning (CHN)	9.700	9.400	9.900	9.800	9.850	9.900	58.550	58.450	117.000
7	Li Xiaoping (CHN)	9.700	9.900	9.800	9.650	9.850	9.900	58.800	58.125	116.925
7	Koji Sotomura (JPN)	9.600	9.800	9.900	9.850	9.950	9.450	58.550	58.375	116.925
9	Nobuyuki Kajitani (JPN)	9.300	9.800	9.950	9.700	9.500	9.900	58.150	58.750	116.900
10	Michael Nikolay (GDR)	9.550	9.900	9.800	9.800	9.750	9.400	58.200	58.650	116.850
11	Bart Conner (USA)	9.750	9.850	9.750	9.700	9.750	9.700	58.500	58.250	116.750
12	György Guczoghy (HUN)	9.700	9.900	9.800	9.800	9.650	9.750	58.600	57.875	116.475
13	Peter Vidmar (USA)	9.800	9.600	9.850	9.700	9.750	9.850	58.550	57.900	116.450
14	Jürgen Nikolai (GDR)	9.650	9.500	9.800	9.800	9.800	9.300	57.850	58.225	116.075
15	Jim Hartung (USA)	9.650	9.900	9.800	9.750	9.550	9.400	58.050	57.875	115.925
16	Li Chol Hon (PRK)	9.750	9.800	9.700	9.750	9.700	9.850	58.550	57.225	115.775
17	Stoyan Deltchev (BUL)	9.700	9.800	9.900	8.900	9.700	9.950	57.950	57.725	115.675
18	Ferenc Donath (HUN)	9.500	9.800	9.800	9.750	9.650	9.650	58.150	57.475	115.625
19	Jurgen Geiger (FRG)	9.250	9.700	9.850	9.700	9.300	9.850	57.650	57.875	115.525
20	Jean Luc Cairon (FRA)	9.700	9.850	9.800	9.700	9.400	9.350	57.800	57.700	115.500
21	Eberhard Gienger (FRG)	9.500	9.750	9.800	9.550	9.500	9.900	58.000	57.475	115.475
22	Warren Long (CAN)	9.800	9.550	9.750	9.800	9.700	9.850	58.450	56.975	115.425
23	Volker Rohrwick (FRG)	9.400	9.500	9.850	9.600	9.700	9.800	57.900	57.400	115.300
24	Emilian Nicula (ROU)	9.650	9.700	9.600	9.700	9.650	9.900	58.200	57.075	115.275
25	Michel Boutard (FRA)	9.600	9.850	9.450	9.700	9.750	9.850	58.150	57.075	115.225
26	Laurent Barbieri (FRA)	9.600	9.800	9.600	9.800	9.100	9.750	57.650	57.200	114.850
26	Marco Piatti (SUI)	9.550	9.700	9.750	9.850	9.450	9.600	57.900	56.950	114.850
28	Kurt Szilier (ROU)	9.600	9.700	9.650	9.700	9.000	9.450	57.100	57.675	114.775
29	Li Su Gil (PRK)	9.600	9.700	9.900	9.700	9.500	9.550	57.950	56.700	114.650
30	Aurel Georgescu (ROU)	9.700	9.600	9.800	9.750	9.100	9.500	57.450	56.875	114.325
31	Sergio Suarez (CUB)	9.900	8.550	9.550	9.800	9.350	10.000	57.150	57.100	114.250
32	Diego Lazzarici (ITA)	9.100	9.400	9.800	9.800	9.650	9.600	57.350	56.800	114.150
33	Dantcho Jordanov (BUL)	9.450	9.400	9.750	9.600	9.350	9.500	57.050	56.825	113.875
34	Sepp Zellweger (SUI)	9.650	9.550	9.550	9.750	9.350	9.200	57.050	56.575	113.625
35	Han Van Son (PRK)	9.450	9.700	9.600	8.950	9.100	9.700	56.500	56.900	113.400
36	Alexander Dityatin (URS)	0.500	9.800	9.250	9.700	9.600	9.900	48.750	58.875	107.625

=== Floor exercise ===
Rank	Gymnast	Score	Prelim score	Total
1st place, gold medalist(s)	Yuri Korolev (URS)	9.900	9.875	19.775
1st place, gold medalist(s)	Li Yuejiu (CHN)	9.950	9.825	19.775
3rd place, bronze medalist(s)	Koji Gushiken (JPN)	9.800	9.850	19.650
4	Peng Yaping (CHN)	9.800	9.675	19.475
5	Aleksandr Tkachyov (URS)	9.700	9.750	19.450
6	Michael Nikolay (GDR)	9.750	9.650	19.400
7	Nobuyuki Kajitani (JPN)	9.550	9.775	19.325
8	Andreas Bronst (GDR)	9.350	9.675	19.025

=== Pommel horse ===
Rank	Gymnast	Score	Prelim score	Total
1st place, gold medalist(s)	Li Xiaoping (CHN)	10.000	9.900	19.900
1st place, gold medalist(s)	Michael Nikolay (GDR)	10.000	9.900	19.900
3rd place, bronze medalist(s)	György Guczoghy (HUN)	10.000	9.875	19.875
3rd place, bronze medalist(s)	Yuri Korolev (URS)	10.000	9.875	19.875
5	Kiyoshi Goto (JPN)	9.900	9.850	19.750
6	Alexander Dityatin (URS)	9.800	9.850	19.650
7	Koji Gushiken (JPN)	9.600	9.900	19.500
8	Li Ning (CHN)	9.400	9.825	19.225

=== Rings ===
Rank	Gymnast	Score	Prelim score	Total
1st place, gold medalist(s)	Alexander Dityatin (URS)	9.950	9.875	19.825
2nd place, silver medalist(s)	Huang Yubin (CHN)	9.850	9.850	19.700
3rd place, bronze medalist(s)	Bogdan Makuts (URS)	9.900	9.750	19.650
4	Tong Fei (CHN)	9.800	9.825	19.625
5	Nobuyuki Kajitani (JPN)	9.800	9.800	19.600
6	Roland Brückner (GDR)	9.800	9.750	19.550
7	Ferenc Donáth (HUN)	9.750	9.750	19.500
8	Willi Moy (FRA)	9.700	9.750	19.450

=== Vault ===
Rank	Gymnast	Score	Prelim score	Total
1st place, gold medalist(s)	Ralf-Peter Hemmann (GDR)	9.975	9.925	19.900
2nd place, silver medalist(s)	Artur Akopyan (URS)	9.950	9.900	19.850
3rd place, bronze medalist(s)	Bogdan Makuts (URS)	9.900	9.900	19.800
4	Casimiro Suarez (CUB)	9.900	9.850	19.750
5	Michael Nikolay (GDR)	9.850	9.800	19.650
6	Jean-Luc Cairon (FRA)	9.800	9.800	19.600
7	James Hartung (USA)	9.750	9.800	19.550
8	Edgar Jorek (FRG)	9.650	9.825	19.475

=== Parallel bars ===
Rank	Gymnast	Score	Prelim score	Total
1st place, gold medalist(s)	Koji Gushiken (JPN)	9.900	9.925	19.825
1st place, gold medalist(s)	Alexander Dityatin (URS)	9.900	9.925	19.825
3rd place, bronze medalist(s)	Nobuyuki Kajitani (JPN)	9.900	9.900	19.800
4	Bogdan Makuts (URS)	9.850	9.925	19.775
5	Michael Nikolay (GDR)	9.900	9.825	19.725
6	Jürgen Nikolay (GDR)	9.850	9.825	19.675
6	Tong Fei (CHN)	9.800	9.875	19.675
8	Eberhard Gienger (FRG)	9.450	9.825	19.275

=== Horizontal bar ===
Rank	Gymnast	Score	Prelim score	Total
1st place, gold medalist(s)	Aleksandr Tkachyov (URS)	10.000	9.900	19.900
2nd place, silver medalist(s)	Artur Akopyan (URS)	10.000	9.875	19.875
2nd place, silver medalist(s)	Eberhard Gienger (FRG)	10.000	9.875	19.875
4	Kiyoshi Goto (JPN)	10.000	9.825	19.825
5	Li Ning (CHN)	9.900	9.850	19.750
6	Koji Gushiken (JPN)	9.800	9.825	19.625
7	Michael Nikolay (GDR)	9.600	9.825	19.425
8	Tong Fei (CHN)	9.400	9.875	19.275

== Women ==
=== Team final ===
Rank	Team	Vault (gymnastics)		Uneven bars		Balance beam		Floor (gymnastics)		Total
Rank	Team	C	O	C	O	C	O	C	O	Total
1st place, gold medalist(s)	Soviet Union	97.250		98.300		95.350		98.400		389.300
1st place, gold medalist(s)	Elena Davydova	9.700	9.800	9.900	9.900	9.500	9.700	9.900	9.850	78.250
1st place, gold medalist(s)	Olga Bicherova	9.750	9.750	9.850	9.850	9.500	9.600	9.800	9.800	77.900
1st place, gold medalist(s)	Maria Filatova	9.650	9.700	9.750	9.800	9.450	9.700	9.700	9.700	77.450
1st place, gold medalist(s)	Stella Zakharova	9.800	9.750	9.750	9.800	9.300	9.250	9.800	9.850	77.300
1st place, gold medalist(s)	Elena Polevaya	9.450	9.600	9.800	9.850	9.400	9.500	9.800	9.800	77.200
1st place, gold medalist(s)	Natalia Ilienko	9.650	9.700	9.800	9.200	9.700	9.300	9.900	9.900	77.150
2nd place, silver medalist(s)	China	96.300		97.750		94.550		96.000		384.600
2nd place, silver medalist(s)	Ma Yanhong	9.500	9.550	9.900	9.900	9.100	9.700	9.800	9.600	77.050
2nd place, silver medalist(s)	Chen Wenyan	9.600	9.600	9.800	9.800	9.450	9.700	9.900	9.200	77.050
2nd place, silver medalist(s)	Zhu Zheng	9.800	9.700	9.750	9.850	9.300	9.650	9.850	8.950	76.850
2nd place, silver medalist(s)	Wu Jiani	9.500	9.500	9.700	9.850	9.300	9.700	9.650	9.600	76.800
2nd place, silver medalist(s)	Wen Jia	9.600	9.600	9.700	9.500	9.300	8.950	9.900	9.550	76.100
2nd place, silver medalist(s)	Li Cuiling	9.700	9.650	9.700	9.400	8.600	9.350	9.500	8.450	74.350
3rd place, bronze medalist(s)	East Germany	96.650		95.750		94.000		95.700		382.100
3rd place, bronze medalist(s)	Steffi Kräker	9.650	9.800	9.150	9.750	9.400	9.300	9.700	9.400	76.150
3rd place, bronze medalist(s)	Annette Lindner	9.400	9.500	9.500	9.750	9.050	9.600	9.550	9.550	75.900
3rd place, bronze medalist(s)	Birgit Senff	9.550	9.800	9.000	9.200	9.300	9.450	9.600	9.500	75.400
3rd place, bronze medalist(s)	Kerstin Jacobs	9.500	9.550	9.600	9.800	8.950	8.600	9.650	9.400	75.050
3rd place, bronze medalist(s)	Franka Voigt	9.500	9.550	9.200	8.700	9.350	9.300	9.600	9.500	74.700
3rd place, bronze medalist(s)	Maxi Gnauck	9.850	9.900	9.850	9.950	9.450	9.800	9.800	2.500	71.100
4	Romania	95.550		96.750		93.700		95.500		381.500
4	Rodica Dunca	9.700	9.600	9.500	9.800	9.350	9.700	9.800	9.600	77.050
4	Lavinia Agache	9.600	9.650	9.700	9.800	9.250	9.700	9.550	9.150	76.400
4	Cristina Grigoraș	9.500	9.700	9.700	9.900	9.300	9.000	9.700	9.350	76.150
4	Emilia Eberle	9.400	9.250	9.000	9.900	9.000	9.500	9.650	9.650	75.350
4	Dumitrița Turner	9.350	9.400	9.500	9.450	9.000	9.550	9.450	9.100	74.800
4	Mihaela Stănuleț	9.500	9.500	9.500	8.850	9.200	9.150	9.500	9.550	74.750
5	Czechoslovakia	95.400		95.700		92.850		95.450		379.650
5	Jana Labáková	9.500	9.700	9.500	9.800	9.250	9.500	9.600	9.750	76.600
5	Eva Marečková	9.600	9.650	9.600	9.800	9.400	9.050	9.600	9.750	76.450
5	Martina Polcrová	9.450	9.650	9.550	9.650	9.350	9.350	9.550	9.500	76.050
5	Jana Gajdošová	9.300	9.450	9.450	9.600	9.100	9.350	9.450	9.200	74.900
5	Jana Rulfová	9.500	9.250	9.350	9.500	8.900	9.550	9.450	9.350	74.850
5	Katarína Šarišská	9.450	9.450	8.600	9.650	8.950	9.050	9.500	9.400	74.050
6	United States	93.250		95.650		94.400		96.100		379.450
6	Julianne McNamara	9.300	8.800	9.750	9.850	9.550	9.800	9.800	9.650	76.500
6	Kathy Johnson	9.350	9.250	9.400	9.750	9.250	9.400	9.800	9.600	75.800
6	Tracee Talavera	9.400	9.400	9.400	9.500	9.400	9.700	9.600	9.350	75.750
6	Amy Koopman	9.200	9.500	9.600	9.600	8.750	9.500	9.750	9.600	75.500
6	Michelle Goodwin	9.300	9.250	9.400	9.350	8.900	9.600	9.450	9.350	74.800
6	Gina Stallone	9.250	9.250	9.450	9.050	9.100	9.600	9.600	9.250	74.550
7	Bulgaria	94.650		94.800		92.150		96.300		377.900
7	Galina Marinova	9.500	9.650	9.400	9.650	8.900	9.400	9.750	9.700	75.950
7	Zoya Grancharova	9.550	9.550	9.400	9.600	9.050	9.100	9.850	9.800	75.900
7	Silviya Topalova	9.450	9.300	9.600	9.800	8.700	9.400	9.700	9.450	75.400
7	Bojanka Demireva	9.350	9.500	9.250	9.600	8.950	9.450	9.300	9.600	75.000
7	Kameliya Troyanova	9.500	9.300	8.500	9.500	9.250	9.500	9.700	9.050	74.300
7	Ivana Gramatikova	9.200	9.300	9.000	9.450	8.900	9.350	9.450	9.300	73.950
8	Hungary	93.650		92.700		92.350		93.600		372.300
8	Andrea Szabo	9.500	9.300	9.250	9.550	8.800	9.400	9.550	9.150	74.500
8	Erika Flander	9.400	9.400	8.600	9.150	9.250	9.550	9.650	9.400	74.400
8	Márta Egervári	9.500	9.250	9.200	9.750	9.050	9.250	9.550	8.800	74.350
8	Zsuzsa Kalmar	9.300	9.400	9.000	9.350	9.250	9.350	9.500	9.150	74.300
8	Krisztina Koteles	9.200	9.400	9.050	9.500	8.950	9.200	9.500	9.150	73.950
8	Margit Tóth	9.200	9.000	8.800	9.250	9.100	9.150	9.000	9.000	72.500

=== All-around ===
Rank	Gymnast	Vault (gymnastics)	Uneven bars	Balance beam	Floor (gymnastics)	Score	Prelim score	Total
1st place, gold medalist(s)	Olga Bicherova (URS)	10.000	9.800	9.750	9.900	39.450	38.950	78.400
2nd place, silver medalist(s)	Maria Filatova (URS)	9.750	9.800	9.900	9.900	39.350	38.725	78.075
3rd place, bronze medalist(s)	Elena Davydova (URS)	9.850	9.850	9.350	9.800	38.850	39.125	77.975
4	Ma Yanhong (CHN)	9.750	9.900	9.700	9.750	39.100	38.525	77.625
5	Cristina Grigoraș (ROU)	9.900	9.700	9.700	9.750	39.050	38.075	77.125
6	Rodica Dunca (ROU)	9.650	9.300	9.700	9.850	38.500	38.525	77.025
7	Lavinia Agache (ROU)	9.900	9.600	9.750	9.450	38.700	38.200	76.900
7	Julianne McNamara (USA)	9.400	9.850	9.700	9.700	38.650	38.250	76.900
9	Eva Marečková (TCH)	9.750	9.650	9.800	9.400	38.600	38.225	76.825
9	Steffi Kräker (GDR)	9.700	9.800	9.700	9.550	38.750	38.075	76.825
11	Chen Wenyan (CHN)	9.650	9.200	9.750	9.550	38.150	38.525	76.675
12	Martina Polcrová (TCH)	9.650	9.650	9.650	9.650	38.600	38.025	76.625
13	Annette Lindner (GDR)	9.500	9.700	9.750	9.650	38.600	37.950	76.550
14	Zhu Zheng (CHN)	9.900	9.750	9.450	9.000	38.100	38.425	76.525
15	Jana Labáková (TCH)	9.650	9.650	9.150	9.650	38.100	38.300	76.400
15	Kathy Johnson (USA)	9.650	9.700	9.550	9.600	38.500	37.900	76.400
17	Zoya Grancharova (BUL)	9.700	9.400	9.550	9.700	38.353	37.950	76.300
18	Galina Marinova (BUL)	9.800	9.550	9.100	9.850	38.300	37.975	76.275
19	Birgit Senff (GDR)	9.800	9.600	9.750	9.350	38.500	37.700	76.200
20	Tracee Talavera (USA)	9.600	9.600	9.700	9.400	38.300	37.875	76.175
21	Romi Kessler (SUI)	9.550	9.650	9.750	9.650	38.600	37.500	76.100
22	Silvia Topalova (BUL)	9.500	9.650	9.050	9.700	37.900	37.700	75.600
23	Erika Flander (HUN)	9.600	9.550	9.450	9.500	38.100	37.200	75.300
24	Andrea Szabo (HUN)	9.400	9.450	9.550	9.250	37.650	37.250	74.900
25	Sabine Blumtritt (FRG)	9.500	9.050	9.400	9.200	37.150	37.575	74.725
26	Yayoi Kano (JPN)	9.600	9.350	8.950	9.500	37.400	37.050	74.450
27	Kazumi Nagayama (JPN)	9.450	9.500	9.500	9.300	37.750	36.375	74.125
28	Dagmar Brannekamper (FRG)	9.500	9.550	9.600	8.950	36.600	37.375	73.975
28	Márta Egervári (HUN)	9.350	9.650	8.950	8.850	36.800	37.175	73.975
30	Elfi Schlegel (CAN)	9.500	9.200	9.200	9.200	37.100	36.675	73.775
31	Ana Manso (ESP)	9.600	8.700	9.400	9.400	37.100	36.650	73.750
32	Yvonne Haug (FRG)	9.650	9.550	8.500	8.450	36.150	37.225	73.375
33	Yuka Hinata (JPN)	9.300	9.100	9.000	9.350	36.750	36.550	73.300
34	Bonnie Wittmeier (CAN)	8.900	9.350	8.850	8.950	36.050	37.175	73.225
35	Mandy Gornall (GBR)	9.000	8.900	9.250	9.100	36.250	36.425	72.675
36	Ann-Marie Deserres (CAN)	9.500	8.700	8.150	8.950	36.300	36.675	71.975

=== Apparatus ===
==== Vault qualification ====
Rank	Gymnast	Prelim	Qualification
1	Maxi Gnauck (GDR)	9.875	Q
2	Stella Zakharova (URS)	9.775	Q
3	Elena Davydova (URS)	9.750	Q
3	Zhu Zheng (CHN)	9.750	Q
3	Olga Bicherova (URS)	9.750	-
6	Steffi Kräker (GDR)	9.725	Q
7	Li Cuiling (CHN)	9.675	Q
7	Maria Filatova (URS)	9.675	-
7	Natalia Ilienko (URS)	9.675	-
7	Birgit Senff (GDR)	9.675	-
11	Rodica Dunca (ROM)	9.650	-
12	Lavinia Agache (ROM)	9.625	Q
13	Eva Marečková (TCH)	9.625	Q

==== Vault final ====
Rank	Gymnast	Score	Prelim score	Total
1st place, gold medalist(s)	Maxi Gnauck (GDR)	9.800	9.875	19.675
2nd place, silver medalist(s)	Stella Zakharova (URS)	9.725	9.775	19.500
3rd place, bronze medalist(s)	Steffi Kräker (GDR)	9.750	9.725	19.475
4	Elena Davydova (URS)	9.575	9.750	19.325
5	Lavinia Agache (ROU)	9.650	9.625	19.275
6	Zhu Zheng (CHN)	9.425	9.750	19.175
7	Li Cuiling (CHN)	9.425	9.675	19.100
8	Eva Marečková (TCH)	9.200	9.625	18.825

==== Uneven bars qualification ====
Rank	Gymnast	Prelim	Qualification
1	Elena Davydova (URS)	9.900	Q
1	Maxi Gnauck (GDR)	9.900	Q
1	Ma Yanhong (CHN)	9.900	Q
4	Olga Bicherova (URS)	9.850	Q
5	Elena Polevaya (URS)	9.825	-
6	Julianne McNamara (USA)	9.800	Q
6	Cristina Grigoraș (ROM)	9.800	Q
6	Chen Wenyan (CHN)	9.800	Q
6	Zhu Zheng (CHN)	9.800	-
10	Maria Filatova (URS)	9.775	-
10	Stella Zakharova (URS)	9.775	-
10	Wu Jiani (CHN)	9.775	-
13	Lavinia Agache (ROM)	9.750	Q

==== Uneven bars final ====
Rank	Gymnast	Score	Prelim score	Total
1st place, gold medalist(s)	Maxi Gnauck (GDR)	10.000	9.900	19.900
2nd place, silver medalist(s)	Ma Yanhong (CHN)	9.900	9.900	19.800
3rd place, bronze medalist(s)	Julianne McNamara (USA)	9.900	9.800	19.700
3rd place, bronze medalist(s)	Elena Davydova (URS)	9.800	9.900	19.700
5	Cristina Grigoraș (ROU)	9.850	9.800	19.650
6	Chen Yongyan (CHN)	9.700	9.800	19.500
7	Lavinia Agache (ROU)	9.700	9.750	19.450
8	Olga Bicherova (URS)	9.550	9.850	19.400

==== Balance beam qualification ====
Rank	Gymnast	Prelim	Qualification
1	Julianne McNamara (USA)	9.675	Q
2	Maxi Gnauck (GDR)	9.625	Q
3	Elena Davydova (URS)	9.600	Q
4	Maria Filatova (URS)	9.575	Q
4	Chen Yongyan (CHN)	9.575	Q
6	Tracee Talavera (USA)	9.550	Q
6	Olga Bicherova (URS)	9.550	
8	Rodica Dunca (ROM)	9.525	Q
9	Wu Jiani (CHN)	9.500	Q
9	Natalia Ilienko (URS)	9.500	-

==== Balance beam final ====
Rank	Gymnast	Score	Prelim score	Total
1st place, gold medalist(s)	Maxi Gnauck (GDR)	9.900	9.625	19.525
2nd place, silver medalist(s)	Chen Yongyan (CHN)	9.700	9.575	19.275
3rd place, bronze medalist(s)	Tracee Talavera (USA)	9.700	9.550	19.250
3rd place, bronze medalist(s)	Wu Jiani (CHN)	9.750	9.500	19.250
5	Julianne McNamara (USA)	9.550	9.675	19.225
6	Maria Filatova (URS)	9.300	9.575	18.875
7	Elena Davydova (URS)	9.150	9.600	18.750
8	Rodica Dunca (ROU)	9.100	9.525	18.625

==== Floor exercise qualification ====
Rank	Gymnast	Prelim	Qualification
1	Natalia Ilienko (URS)	9.900	Q
2	Elena Davydova (URS)	9.875	Q
3	Zoya Grancharova (BUL)	9.825	Q
3	Stella Zakharova (URS)	9.825	-
5	Olga Bicherova (URS)	9.800	-
5	Elena Polevaya (URS)	9.800	-
7	Wen Jia (CHN)	9.725	Q
7	Julianne McNamara (USA)	9.725	Q
7	Galina Marinova (BUL)	9.725	Q
10	Ma Yanhong (CHN)	9.700	Q
10	Rodica Dunca (ROM)	9.700	Q
10	Maria Filatova (URS)	9.700	-
10	Kathy Johnson (USA)	9.700	-

==== Floor exercise final ====
Rank	Gymnast	Score	Prelim score	Total
1st place, gold medalist(s)	Natalia Ilienko (URS)	9.950	9.900	19.850
2nd place, silver medalist(s)	Elena Davydova (URS)	9.900	9.875	19.775
3rd place, bronze medalist(s)	Zoya Grancharova (BUL)	9.850	9.825	19.675
4	Wen Jia (CHN)	9.800	9.725	19.525
5	Ma Yanhong (CHN)	9.750	9.700	19.450
5	Rodica Dunca (ROU)	9.750	9.700	19.450
7	Julianne McNamara (USA)	9.700	9.725	19.425
8	Galina Marinova (BUL)	9.200	9.725	18.925

== Medals ==
Rank	Nation	Gold	Silver	Bronze	Total
1	Soviet Union (URS)	9	6	5	20
2	East Germany (GDR)	5	0	2	7
3	China (CHN)	2	4	2	8
4	Japan (JPN)	1	1	3	5
5	West Germany (FRG)	0	1	0	1
6	United States (USA)	0	0	2	2
7	Bulgaria (BUL)	0	0	1	1
7	Hungary (HUN)	0	0	1	1
Totals (8 entries)		17	12	16	45
