= Alla Misnik =

Soviet artistic gymnast (1967–2006)

- Full name: Alla Vasylivna Misnik
- Born: 27 August 1967 Kharkiv, Ukrainian SSR, Soviet Union
- Died: 11 July 2006 (aged 38) United States

Gymnastics career
- Discipline: Women's artistic gymnastics
- Country represented: Soviet Union
- Club: Trudoviye Reservi
- Head coach: Valentin Shumovsky
- Former coach: Svetlana Shumovskaya
Medal record
Representing Soviet Union
European Championships
| Silver medal – second place | 1981 Madrid | Uneven bars |
| Silver medal – second place | 1981 Madrid | Floor exercise |
| Bronze medal – third place | 1981 Madrid | All-around |

Alla Vasylivna Misnik (Ukrainian: Алла Василівна Місник; 27 August 1967 – 11 July 2006) was a Soviet artistic gymnast. She won three medals at the 1981 European Championships – silver on uneven bars and floor exercise, and bronze in the all-around. She competed for the Soviet team from 1981 until 1983, but she never competed at a World Championships or an Olympic Games.

== Gymnastics career ==
Misnik won a bronze medal in the all-around at the 1979 Junior USSR Cup in the Candidate for Master of Sport division. She also won silver medals on the uneven bars and balance beam. Then at the 1980 Junior USSR Championships, she won the all-around bronze medal behind Olga Bicherova and Elena Brazhnikova. She won the gold medal in the uneven bars final at the bronze medal in the floor exercise final.

When she was fourteen years old, Misnik competed at the 1981 European Championships in Madrid. She won the bronze medal in the all-around behind Maxi Gnauck and Cristina Elena Grigoraș. She then won silver medals in the uneven bars and floor exercise finals, both behind Gnauck. Additionally, she finished fifth on the balance beam despite a fall and eighth on the vault. She won the all-around title at the 1981 USSR Cup by nearly two points ahead of Tatiana Frolova. She also won gold medals in the uneven bars and balance beam finals.

Misnik led the Soviet team to win a 1982 friendly meet against the United States. In May 1982, she was hospitalized due to an illness but still competed at the USSR Cup, only finishing 10th in the all-around.

At the 1983 Riga International, Misnik won the all-around silver medal behind teammate Tatiana Frolova. Additionally, she tied with Frolova for the floor exercise gold medal. She helped the Soviet Union win a 1983 dual meet against the United States, and she won the bronze medal in the all-around behind teammates Albina Shishova and Olga Mostepanova. She placed 10th in the all-around at the 1983 USSR Cup. She stopped competing in 1983.

== Death ==
Misnik died on 11 July 2006, while living in the United States due to a stroke.

== Competitive history ==
Competitive history of Alla Misnik
| Year | Event | Team | AA | VT | UB | BB | FX |
|---|---|---|---|---|---|---|---|
| 1979 | USSR Cup | | 3rd place, bronze medalist(s) | | 2nd place, silver medalist(s) | 2nd place, silver medalist(s) | |
| 1980 | Italian International | | 3rd place, bronze medalist(s) | | | | |
| 1980 | USSR Championships | 2nd place, silver medalist(s) | 3rd place, bronze medalist(s) | | 1st place, gold medalist(s) | | 3rd place, bronze medalist(s) |
| 1981 | Milan Grand Prix | | 4 | | | | |
| 1981 | European Championships | | 3rd place, bronze medalist(s) | 8 | 2nd place, silver medalist(s) | 5 | 2nd place, silver medalist(s) |
| 1981 | Moscow News | | 1st place, gold medalist(s) | | | | |
| 1981 | Schoolchildren's Spartakiade | 2nd place, silver medalist(s) | | | 4 | | |
| 1981 | Trudoviye Reservi Club Championships | | 1st place, gold medalist(s) | | | | |
| 1981 | USSR Cup | | 1st place, gold medalist(s) | | 1st place, gold medalist(s) | 1st place, gold medalist(s) | 3rd place, bronze medalist(s) |
| 1982 | USA-USSR Dual Meet | 1st place, gold medalist(s) | 8 | | | | |
| 1982 | USSR Championships | | 13 | | | | |
| 1982 | USSR Cup | 10 | | | | | |
| 1983 | Riga International | | 2nd place, silver medalist(s) | | | | 1st place, gold medalist(s) |
| 1983 | Trudoviye Reservi Club Championships | | 2nd place, silver medalist(s) | | | | |
| 1983 | Ukrainian Spartikade | | 1st place, gold medalist(s) | | | | |
| 1983 | USA-USSR Dual Meet | 1st place, gold medalist(s) | 3rd place, bronze medalist(s) | | | | |
| 1983 | USSR Cup | | 10 | | | | |
| 1983 | USSR Spartikade | | | | 6 | | |
