= Gymnastics at the 1984 Summer Olympics – Women's uneven bars =

Women's uneven bars at the Games of the XXIII Olympiad
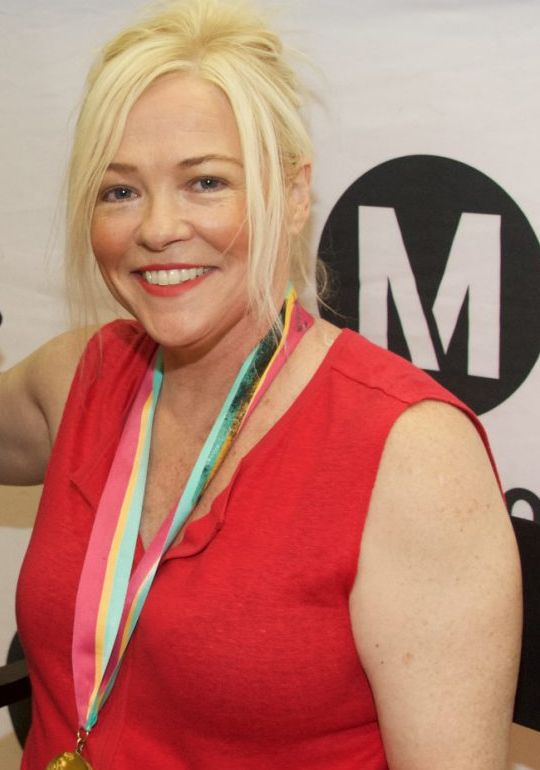
- Julianne McNamara (2016)
- Venue: UCLA's Pauley Pavilion
- Date: July 30, 1984 (qualifying); August 5, 1984 (final)
- Competitors: 8 from 5 nations
- Winning points: 19.950

Medalists
1st place, gold medalist(s)		Ma Yanhong	China
1st place, gold medalist(s)		Julianne McNamara	United States
2nd place, silver medalist(s)		not awarded	
3rd place, bronze medalist(s)		Mary Lou Retton	United States

These are the results of the women's uneven bars competition, one of six events for female competitors in artistic gymnastics at the 1984 Summer Olympics in Los Angeles. The qualification and final rounds took place on July 30, August 1 and 5 at UCLA’s Pauley Pavilion.

== Results ==
Sixty-five gymnasts competed in the compulsory and optional rounds on July 30 and August 1. The eight highest scoring gymnasts advanced to the final on August 5. Each country was limited to two competitors in the final. Half of the points earned by each gymnast during both the compulsory and optional rounds carried over to the final. This constitutes the "prelim" score.

Rank	Gymnast	C	O	Prelim	Final	Total
Gold medal	Ma Yanhong (CHN)	9.900	10.000	9.950	10.000	19.950
Gold medal	Julianne McNamara (USA)	9.900	10.000	9.950	10.000	19.950
Bronze medal	Mary Lou Retton (USA)	9.800	9.900	9.850	9.950	19.800
4	Mihaela Stănuleţ (ROU)	9.700	9.800	9.750	9.900	19.650
5	Romi Kessler (SUI)	9.600	9.750	9.575	9.750	19.425
6	Zhou Ping (CHN)	9.550	9.650	9.600	9.750	19.350
7	Noriko Mochizuki (JPN)	9.300	9.750	9.525	9.800	19.325
8	Lavinia Agache (ROU)	9.850	9.550	9.700	9.300	19.000

Preceded by Gymnastics at the 1980 Summer Olympics – Women's uneven bars	Women's uneven bars 1984	Succeeded by Gymnastics at the 1988 Summer Olympics – Women's uneven bars
