= Gymnastics at the 1984 Summer Olympics – Men's artistic team all-around =

Men's artistic team all-around at the Games of the XXIII Olympiad
- Venue: UCLA's Pauley Pavilion
- Date: July 31, 1984
- Competitors: 54 from 9 nations
- Winning total: 591.400 points

Medalists
1st place, gold medalist(s)		Bart Conner; Peter Vidmar; Scott Johnson; Mitch Gaylord; Jim Hartung; Tim Daggett	United States
2nd place, silver medalist(s)		Lou Yun; Li Yuejiu; Xu Zhiqiang; Tong Fei; Li Ning; Li Xiaoping	China
3rd place, bronze medalist(s)		Shinji Morisue; Noritoshi Hirata; Koji Sotomura; Nobuyuki Kajitani; Kyoji Yamawaki; Kōji Gushiken	Japan

These are the results of the men's team all-around competition, one of eight events for male competitors in artistic gymnastics at the 1984 Summer Olympics in Los Angeles. The compulsory and optional rounds took place on July 29 and 31 at UCLA’s Pauley Pavilion.

== Team Final ==
Rank	Team	Floor		Pommel horse		Rings		Vault		Parallel bars		Horizontal bar		Total
Rank	Team	C	O	C	O	C	O	C	O	C	O	C	O	Total
Gold medal	United States	98.050		98.550		98.400		98.650		98.950		98.800		591.400
Gold medal	Peter Vidmar	9.800	9.800	10.000	9.900	9.800	9.850	9.800	9.850	9.900	9.900	9.950	9.950	118.500
Gold medal	Bart Conner	9.950	9.900	9.900	9.750	9.700	9.800	9.800	9.850	9.900	10.000	9.900	9.900	118.300
Gold medal	Mitch Gaylord	9.700	9.750	9.900	9.850	9.850	10.000	9.950	9.900	10.000	9.900	9.400	9.950	118.150
Gold medal	Tim Daggett	9.750	9.500	9.900	9.900	9.750	9.900	9.700	9.800	9.800	9.900	9.900	10.000	117.800
Gold medal	Jim Hartung	9.800	9.800	9.800	9.700	9.800	9.850	9.900	9.900	9.750	9.900	9.800	9.800	117.750
Gold medal	Scott Johnson	9.800	9.700	9.700	9.650	9.650	9.850	9.850	9.850	9.600	9.800	9.650	9.500	116.600
Silver medal	China	98.600		97.900		98.100		98.700		98.350		99.150		590.800
Silver medal	Li Ning	9.900	9.950	10.000	9.950	9.800	10.000	9.900	9.900	9.850	9.900	9.500	9.900	118.450
Silver medal	Tong Fei	9.700	9.950	9.850	9.850	9.700	10.000	9.850	9.800	9.850	9.900	10.000	9.950	118.400
Silver medal	Xu Zhiqiang	9.800	9.900	9.750	9.750	9.700	9.950	9.800	9.850	9.800	9.950	10.000	9.900	118.150
Silver medal	Lou Yun	9.950	9.900	9.200	9.600	9.600	9.900	10.000	10.000	9.700	9.900	9.950	9.950	117.650
Silver medal	Li Xiaoping	9.650	9.850	10.000	9.350	9.550	9.900	9.750	9.800	9.600	9.750	9.700	9.950	116.850
Silver medal	Li Yuejiu	9.550	9.900	9.600	9.600	9.400	9.850	9.750	9.850	9.550	9.900	9.850	9.900	116.700
Bronze medal	Japan	97.850		96.050		98.000		98.250		98.000		98.550		586.700
Bronze medal	Kōji Gushiken	9.800	9.900	9.800	9.450	9.900	9.900	9.850	9.900	9.900	9.900	10.000	9.900	118.200
Bronze medal	Nobuyuki Kajitani	9.300	9.800	9.600	9.850	9.800	9.800	9.700	9.900	9.950	9.900	9.900	9.450	116.950
Bronze medal	Noritoshi Hirata	9.500	9.750	9.600	9.800	9.650	9.750	9.700	9.800	9.750	9.800	9.800	9.900	116.800
Bronze medal	Shinji Morisue	9.650	9.900	9.400	9.600	9.500	9.800	9.950	9.750	9.150	9.900	10.000	10.000	116.600
Bronze medal	Koji Sotomura	9.800	9.900	9.550	9.250	9.750	9.600	9.750	9.800	9.400	9.750	9.750	9.750	116.050
Bronze medal	Kyoji Yamawaki	9.700	9.900	8.650	9.400	9.750	9.900	9.850	9.750	9.600	9.900	9.700	9.550	115.650

== Results ==
The final score for each team was determined by combining all of the scores earned by the team on each apparatus during the compulsory and optional rounds. If all six gymnasts on a team performed a routine on a single apparatus during compulsories or optionals, only the five highest scores on that apparatus counted toward the team total.

Rank	Team	Members	Total
Gold medal	United States	Bart Conner, Peter Vidmar, Scott Johnson, Mitch Gaylord, Jim Hartung, Tim Daggett	591.400
Silver medal	China	Lou Yun, Li Yuejiu, Xu Zhiqiang, Tong Fei, Li Ning, Li Xiaoping	590.800
Bronze medal	Japan	Shinji Morisue, Noritoshi Hirata, Koji Sotomura, Nobuyuki Kajitani, Kyoji Yamawaki, Kōji Gushiken	586.700
4	West Germany	Daniel Winkler, Bernhard Simmelbauer, Andreas Japtok, Benno Groß, Jürgen Geiger, Volker Rohrwick	582.100
5	Switzerland	Urs Meister, Bruno Cavelti, Marco Piatti, Josef Zellweger, Markus Lehmann, Daniel Wunderlin	579.950
6	France	Michel Boutard, Joël Suty, Philippe Vatuone, Jacques Def, Jean-Luc Cairon, Laurent Barbiéri	578.250
7	Canada	Warren Long, Allan Reddon, Brad Peters, Frank Nutzenberger, Philippe Chartrand, Daniel Gaudet	577.150
8	South Korea	Nam Seung-gu, Han Chung-sik, Lee Jeong-sik, Chae Gwang-seok, Jang Tae-eun, Ju Yeong-sam	574.950
9	Great Britain	Eddie Van Hoof, Richard Benyon, Barry Winch, Keith Langley, Terry Bartlett, Andrew Morris	571.000
