= Bridgette Caquatto =

American artistic gymnast

- Nickname: Bridgey
- Born: March 14, 1994 (age 32)

Gymnastics career
- Discipline: Women's artistic gymnastics
- Country represented: United States (2009–2012)
- College team: Florida Gators
- Club: Legacy Elite Gymnastics
- Head coaches: Jiani Wu; Yuejiu Li
- Former coach: Rhonda Faehn
- Music: Jai Ho! (2011), Bom Bom (2013
- Retired: April 16, 2016
Medal record
Representing the United States
Pan American Games
Gold medal – first place	2011 Guadalajara	Team
Gold medal – first place	2011 Guadalajara	All-Around
Gold medal – first place	2011 Guadalajara	Uneven Bars
City of Jesolo Trophy
Gold medal – first place	2011 Jesolo	Team
Gold medal – first place	2011 Jesolo	Uneven Bars
Representing the Florida Gators
NCAA National Championships
Gold medal – first place	2015 Fort Worth	Team
Gold medal – first place	2014 Birmingham	Team
Gold medal – first place	2013 Los Angeles	Team

Bridgette Caquatto (born March 14, 1994) is an American former artistic gymnast who competed for the University of Florida. She made her national debut in 2007 and won the all-around and uneven bars finals at the 2011 Pan American Games.

== Early life ==
Caquatto was born to Dave and Lin Caquatto on March 14, 1994. She began taking gymnastics classes at the age of 2, following in the footsteps of her older sister, Mackenzie.

== Junior career ==
Caquatto's first national competition was the U.S. Classic in 2007, where she finished 19th in the all-around. At her last competition as a junior, the 2009 National Championships, she finished second in the all-around and on vault and placed in the top ten on the other events.

== Senior career ==
A series of injuries kept Caquatto out of major competitions in 2010. The following year, she competed at the U.S. Classic and the National Championships, earning top ten placings. To avoid re-injuring her knee, she performed watered-down vaults, and the uneven bars became her strongest event.

Her first international assignment as a senior was the 2011 City of Jesolo Trophy in Italy, where she placed in the top ten on every event. Later that year, at the Pan American Games in Guadalajara, she helped the U.S. team win the gold medal and went on to win individual gold medals in the all-around and on the uneven bars.

== College career ==
Caquatto joined the Florida Gators gymnastics team in the fall of 2012, joining her sister, Mackenzie. During her college career, she competed on vault, uneven bars, and floor exercise, and helped the Gators win NCAA national championship titles in 2013 and 2014.
