= Olga Bicherova =

Soviet gymnast

- Ольга Бичерова
- Full name: Olga Anatolyevna Bicherova
- Born: 26 October 1967 (age 58) Moscow, Russian SFSR, Soviet Union

Gymnastics career
- Discipline: Women's artistic gymnastics
- Country represented: Soviet Union
Medal record
Representing Soviet Union
World Championships
Gold medal – first place	1981 Moscow	Team
Gold medal – first place	1981 Moscow	All-Around
Gold medal – first place	1983 Budapest	Team
World Cup Final
Gold medal – first place	1982 Zagreb	All-Around
Gold medal – first place	1982 Zagreb	Vault
Gold medal – first place	1982 Zagreb	Floor Exercise
Silver medal – second place	1982 Zagreb	Uneven Bars
Bronze medal – third place	1982 Zagreb	Balance Beam
European Championships
Gold medal – first place	1983 Gothenburg	All-Around
Gold medal – first place	1983 Gothenburg	Vault
Gold medal – first place	1983 Gothenburg	Floor Exercise

Olga Anatolyevna Bicherova (Russian: Ольга Анатольевна Бичерова; born 26 October 1967 or 1966) is a retired Soviet gymnast, who won the women's all-around gold medal at the 1981 World Artistic Gymnastics Championships.

== Career ==
Bicherova began gymnastics at age 7, initially training at the CSKA Moscow sports school and later representing the Armed Forces sports society. Her first major success was at the 1980 Junior Friendship Tournament, where she won the team gold, all-around title and placed first on the vault. A year later, Bicherova won the team gold and all-around gold at the 1981 World Championships, starting a series of major international successes, which included the all-around title at both the 1982 World Cup and the 1983 European Championships. She didn't compete at the boycotted 1984 Summer Olympics and also missed the Friendship Games. Olga's youthful appearance at the 1981 Gymnastics Championship caused many to question her age (supposedly 15), and hence her eligibility to compete.

Bicherova was an Honoured Master of Sports of the USSR. Due to an elbow injury, she retired from gymnastics in 1988 and worked as a coach for some time. She married fellow Soviet gymnast Valentin Mogilny.

== Competitive history ==
Year	Event	Team	AA	VT	UB	BB	FX
Junior
1978	Junior Prague-Moscow Dual Meet	1st place, gold medalist(s)	3rd place, bronze medalist(s)				
1979	Junior Friendship Tournament	1st place, gold medalist(s)	9	5			
1979	Junior GDR-USSR Dual Meet		2nd place, silver medalist(s)				
1979	Junior USSR Championships		1st place, gold medalist(s)	1st place, gold medalist(s)			2nd place, silver medalist(s)
1979	Junior USSR Cup		5			2nd place, silver medalist(s)	
1980	Junior Friendship Tournament	1st place, gold medalist(s)	1st place, gold medalist(s)	1st place, gold medalist(s)			2nd place, silver medalist(s)
1980	Junior GDR-USSR Dual Meet		7				
1980	Junior USSR Championships	3rd place, bronze medalist(s)	1st place, gold medalist(s)	1st place, gold medalist(s)		2nd place, silver medalist(s)	
1980	TBS Cup			1st place, gold medalist(s)	1st place, gold medalist(s)		1st place, gold medalist(s)
Senior
1981	Chunichi Cup		1st place, gold medalist(s)	1st place, gold medalist(s)		1st place, gold medalist(s)	
1981	European Championships		23	4			
1981	Junior Friendship Tournament		1st place, gold medalist(s)				
1981	Moscow Championships		1st place, gold medalist(s)				
1981	Schoolchildren's Spartakiade	1st place, gold medalist(s)	3rd place, bronze medalist(s)				6
1981	Tokyo Cup			1st place, gold medalist(s)		1st place, gold medalist(s)	
1981	USSR Championships		4	3rd place, bronze medalist(s)	4		
1981	World Championships	1st place, gold medalist(s)	1st place, gold medalist(s)		8		
1982	Budapest Invitational					1st place, gold medalist(s)	
1982	World Cup Final		1st place, gold medalist(s)	1st place, gold medalist(s)	2nd place, silver medalist(s)	3rd place, bronze medalist(s)	1st place, gold medalist(s)
1982	USA-USSR Dual Meet		7				
1983
1983	European Championships		1st place, gold medalist(s)	1st place, gold medalist(s)			1st place, gold medalist(s)
1983	USSR Cup		18	2nd place, silver medalist(s)			
1983	World Championships	1st place, gold medalist(s)		5			
1985	Summer Universiade	1st place, gold medalist(s)					
1985	USSR Championships				9		
1985	USSR Cup		10				
1986	Leningrad International		6	2nd place, silver medalist(s)		3rd place, bronze medalist(s)	
1986	USSR Championships			5	4	6	
1986	USSR Cup		5				
1986	USSR Spartakiade		4			6	
1987	USA-USSR Dual Meet	1st place, gold medalist(s)	8				
1988	Champions All		10				
