= Regina Buggy =

American field hockey player

Personal information
- Nickname: Gina
- Born: November 12, 1959 (age 66) Plymouth Meeting, Pennsylvania, U.S.
Medal record
Women's Field Hockey
Representing the United States
Olympic Games
Bronze medal – third place	1984 Los Angeles	Team competition

Regina "Gina" Buggy (born November 12, 1959, in Plymouth Meeting, Pennsylvania) is a former field hockey player from the United States, who was a member of the Women's National Team that won the bronze medal at the 1984 Summer Olympics in Los Angeles, California.
