= Anna Li =

American artistic gymnast

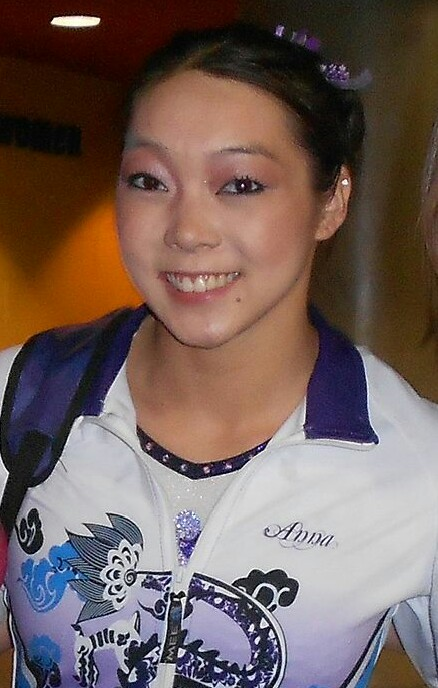
- Li in May 2012

Personal information
- Full name: Anna Li
- Born: September 4, 1988 (age 38) Las Vegas, Nevada
- Height: 5 ft 4 in (163 cm)

Gymnastics career
- Discipline: Women's artistic gymnastics
- Country represented: United States (2011–2012 (USA))
- College team: UCLA Bruins
- Gym: Legacy Elite Gymnastics
- Head coaches: Wu Jiani; Li Yuejiu
- Former coaches: Valorie Kondos Field; Chris Waller
- Music: Requiem for a Dream (2010), Inception (2012)
- Retired: July 26, 2012
Medal record
World Championships
Gold medal – first place	2011 Tokyo	Team
NCAA National Championships
Gold medal – first place	2010 Gainesville	Team

Anna Li (born September 4, 1988) is an American retired artistic gymnast. She was an 8-time All-American gymnast while competing in the NCAA and a member of the UCLA Bruins women's gymnastics team that won the 2010 NCAA National Championship title. She was on the US National Team in 2011 - 2012. Her parents, Li Yuejiu and Wu Jiani were Olympic gymnasts who competed for China at the 1984 Summer Olympics and are also her coaches. She has a younger sister, Andrea Li, who is also a gymnast. While training as a Level 10 and Elite gymnast she attended and graduated from Waubonsie Valley High School in Aurora, Illinois.

Born in Las Vegas, Nevada, Li started competing in gymnastics when she was six years old at Las Vegas Flyers. She trained in Nevada until her family moved to Illinois in 2002. Anna qualified to the Senior Elite level in 2004, competing the US National Championships in both 2004 and 2005 before being recruited by the UCLA Bruins. She was unable to compete for most of 2006 due to injury.

== Career ==
=== NCAA ===
Anna joined the UCLA Bruins women's gymnastics team. During her time with UCLA, she won six regional titles: four uneven bars, one vault and one balance beam. She scored three perfect-10s on the uneven bars and won eight All-American honors. In 2010, she helped lead the Bruins to the NCAA Championship title. Her first competition in the NCAA was a home meet at Pauley Pavilion, where her parents had competed in the Olympics.

=== 2011 ===
After finishing her four years with the Bruins, Li decided that she was not done with gymnastics. While finishing up her history degree, she trained alongside Bruins teammate, Vanessa Zamarripa, who was also returning to elite gymnastics, sometimes using the AOGC gym to train in After leaving UCLA, she returned home to train with her parents at Legacy Elite Gymnastics in Illinois. Li also made a guest appearance on the ABC Family television show, Make It Or Break It.

In July 2011, Li formally returned to the elite level by competing at the American Classic, placing first on uneven bars and third on balance beam. She competed in the same two events at the Covergirl Classic in Chicago Illinois later that year. Despite a fall, she still tied for seventh place on uneven bars with a score of 14.300.

In August, Li competed in the U.S. National Championships in St. Paul, Minnesota, where she tied for third on uneven bars (two-day total: 29.450) and fourteenth on balance beam (two-day total: 26.650). Her scores qualified her for the national team. She was chosen by U.S. National Team Coordinator Marta Karolyi and her husband, Bela Karolyi, to attend the World and Pan-American Teams Selection camps at the Karolyi Ranch in New Waverly, Texas. Li was then chosen for the 2011 World Artistic Gymnastics Championships as an alternate in Tokyo, Japan.

=== 2012 ===
Li was chosen as an alternate along with Elizabeth Price and Sarah Finnegan for the 2012 London Olympics team after placing third on the uneven bars at the Trials. She later fell training on the uneven bars, injuring her neck on the last day of training for replacement athletes. She performed in the Kellogg's Tour of Gymnastics Champions with the rest of the Olympic team.
