= Mackenzie Caquatto =

American gymnast (born 1992)

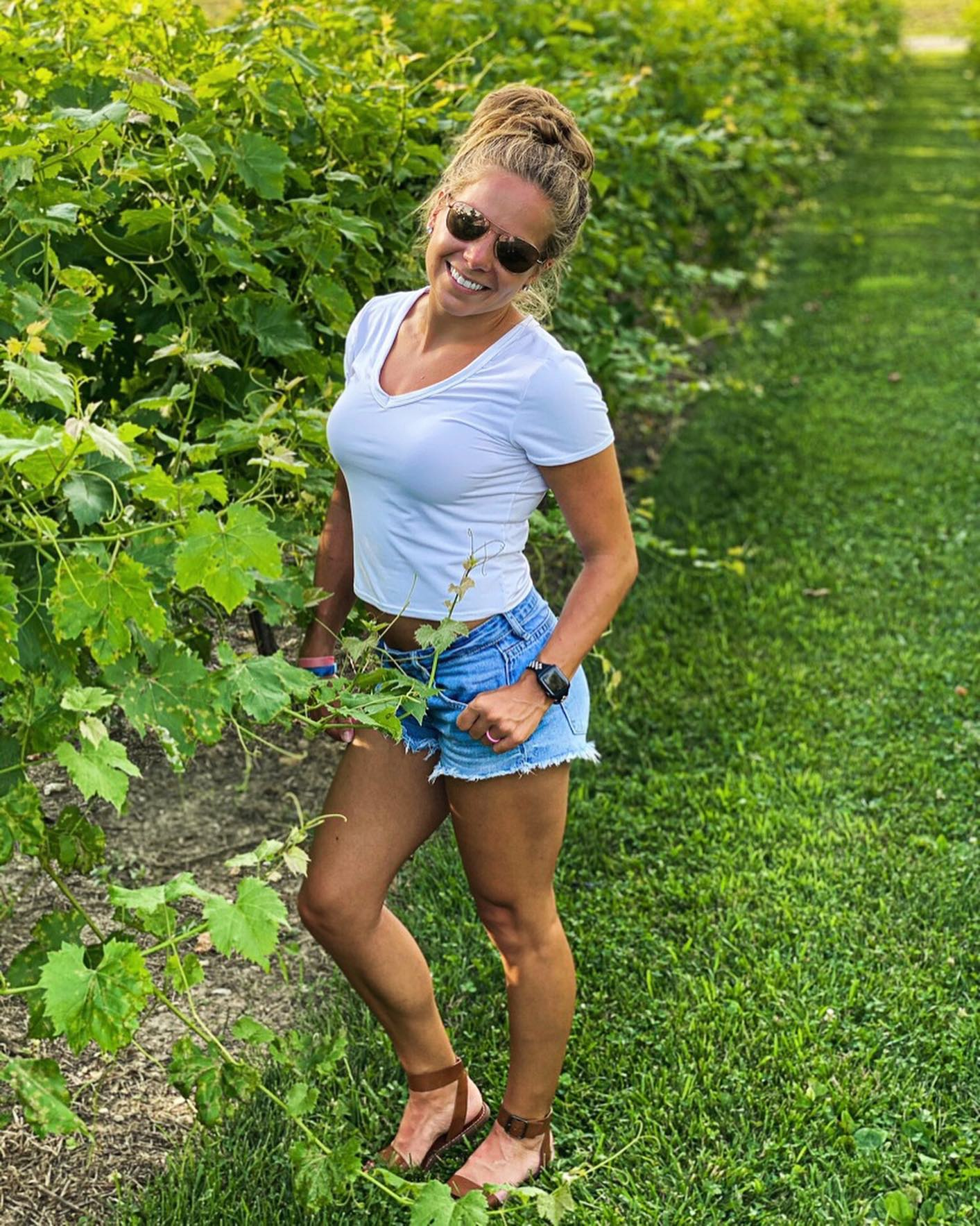
- Caquatto in September 2020

Personal information
- Full name: Mackenzie Caquatto Jaworski
- Nicknames: Mack, Macko, Quatto, Calquettra, Calcutta, Quattro, Calquatto
- Born: March 26, 1992 (age 34)

Gymnastics career
- Discipline: Women's artistic gymnastics
- Country represented: United States (2008–2011)
- College team: Florida Gators
- Gym: Legacy Elite Gymnastics
- Head coaches: Jiani Wu; Yuejiu Li
- Former coach: Rhonda Faehn
- Retired: April 20, 2014
Medal record
Women's gymnastics
Representing the United States
World Championships
Silver medal – second place	2010 Rotterdam	Team
Visa Championships
Silver medal – second place	2010 Hartford	Uneven bars
Silver medal – second place	2011 St. Paul	Uneven bars
Bronze medal – third place	2009 Dallas	Uneven bars

Mackenzie Caquatto Jaworksi (born March 26, 1992) is a former artistic gymnast who represented the United States at the 2010 World Championships and competed for the University of Florida. Her younger sister, Bridgette Caquatto, is also a former elite gymnast. She married former elite runner Griffin Jaworski on September 4, 2020.

== Gymnastics career ==
=== 2007–2009 ===
Caquatto first qualified as an elite gymnast in 2007 and competed at the National Championships that year, finishing 17th.

Her first senior competition was the 2008 National Championships, where she placed 10th in the all-around. She was named to the national team and qualified to the Olympic Trials, but competed only on the first day, finishing 12th.

In 2009, she competed at her first international meets as a member of the national team and placed 5th at the National Championships, despite a knee injury. At the Toyota International in Japan, she competed on the uneven bars, balance beam, and floor exercise and won the silver medal on bars with a score of 14.675, behind world silver medalist Koko Tsurumi of Japan. She was also the first alternate to the U.S. team for the 2009 World Artistic Gymnastics Championships.

=== 2010 ===
Caquatto started her 2010 season at the City of Jesolo Trophy in Italy, where she had the highest beam score but missed a medal in the all-around because of mistakes on floor exercise. At the 2010 U.S. Classic, she placed 3rd in the all-around, with the second-highest scores on vault and uneven bars but a fall on balance beam. She qualified to the National Championships, where she placed 5th in the all-around after falling on a simple grip change on the uneven bars, her best event.

Based on her performance at Nationals, Caquatto advanced to the team selection camp for the 2010 World Championships. She went on to win the all-around at a second selection camp and was named to the team.

At the World Championships, she placed 9th in the all-around in qualifications but did not advance to the individual all-around final because only two athletes per country can qualify, and her teammates Aly Raisman and Rebecca Bross scored higher. In the team final, she scored 14.666 on bars and 15.000 on vault to help the U.S. win the silver medal, behind Russia but ahead of China.

=== 2011 ===
After competing for the University of Florida for the 2010–11 season, Caquatto decided to train for a comeback to elite gymnastics. At the 2011 U.S. Classic, she competed on bars, scoring 14.750, and performed a somewhat watered-down routine on balance beam, scoring 14.100.

At the National Championships, she competed in the all-around and finished the first day of competition in sixth place with a score of 56.000, counting a fall on beam. However, with solid performances on the second day of competition and injuries to Chellsie Memmel and defending national champion Bross, she placed fourth behind Jordyn Wieber, Raisman, and McKayla Maroney. She also took second place on the uneven bars, just 0.050 behind Wieber.

Caquatto earned a spot on her fourth national team and was invited to the first world team selection camp, but she injured her ankles on a beam dismount at the camp. After sitting out the beginning of the NCAA season, she began competing on the uneven bars again in early 2012.

== Skills ==
Caquatto performed the following skills in 2010:

Apparatus	Skills	D Score	Top Score in World Championship/World Cup/Olympic Competition
Vault	Double-twisting Yurchenko	5.8	15.000
Uneven Bars	Jump to high bar mount, kip cast to reverse grip handstand, Jaeger (D), kip cast to handstand, toe-on piked Tkatchev (E) to Pak salto (D), kip cast to handstand, Maloney (D) to bail (D) to toe-on full pirouette (D) to toe-on shoot to high bar, kip cast to handstand, Tkatchev (D), kip cast to handstand, giant, full-twisting double tuck dismount (D)	6.2	14.666
Balance Beam	Leap mount, side somi (D), front aerial (D) to back handspring (B) to layout step-out (C), full turn with leg at horizontal (C), split jump to sissone, switch split leap 1/2 (D) to back tuck (C)*, front pike with takeoff from one foot (C), switch split leap (C) to back tuck or pike (C), roundoff to double pike dismount (E)	5.7 (5.8*)	14.266
Floor Exercise	Roundoff back handspring to full-in double pike (E) (triple twisting back layout (E)*), roundoff back handspring to a triple twisting back layout (E) (roundoff to 1 1/2 back layout (C) to full twisting front layout (C)*), double turn with leg at horizontal (D), tour jete 1/2 (C), switch split ring leap (C) to switch split leap 1/2 (C), roundoff to 1 1/2 twisting back layout (C) to full twisting front layout (C) (front handspring to double twisting front layout (D)*), roundoff back handspring double pike dismount (D)	5.6 (5.5*)	13.533 (with slightly watered-down exercise)

- *Variation competed for 2011.

== Competitive history ==
=== Senior career history ===
Year	Competition Description	Location	Apparatus	Rank-Final	Score-Final	Rank-Qualifying	Score-Qualifying
2011	CoverGirl Classic	Chicago, IL	Uneven Bars	4	14.750		
2011	CoverGirl Classic	Chicago, IL	Balance Beam	12	14.100		
2011	U.S. Championships	Saint Paul, MN	All-Around	4	112.500	6	56.000
2011	U.S. Championships	Saint Paul, MN	Uneven bars	2	29.750	2	15.000
2011	U.S. Championships	Saint Paul, MN	Balance Beam	12T	26.700	18	12.650
2011	U.S. Championships	Saint Paul, MN	Floor Exercise	10	27.200	6T	13.650

Year	Competition Description	Location	Apparatus	Rank-Final	Score-Final	Rank-Qualifying	Score-Qualifying
2010	CoverGirl Classic	Chicago, IL	All Around	3	56.450		
2010	CoverGirl Classic	Chicago, IL	Vault	2	14.850		
2010	CoverGirl Classic	Chicago, IL	Uneven Bars	2	15.050		
2010	CoverGirl Classic	Chicago, IL	Balance Beam	20	12.950		
2010	CoverGirl Classic	Chicago, IL	Floor Exercise	8	13.600		
2010	U.S. Championships	Hartford, CT	All-Around	5T	113.350	5T	56.800
2010	U.S. Championships	Hartford, CT	Uneven bars	2	28.900	4	15.000
2010	U.S. Championships	Hartford, CT	Balance Beam	7T	27.550	9	13.500
2010	U.S. Championships	Hartford, CT	Floor Exercise	8	27.700	10T	13.700
2010	World Gymnastics Championships	Rotterdam, The Netherlands	Team All-Around	2	175.196	3	233.643
2010	World Gymnastics Championships	Rotterdam, The Netherlands	All-Around			9	57.198
2010	World Gymnastics Championships	Rotterdam, The Netherlands	Vault		15.000 (team finals)	6	14.933 (no average)
2010	World Gymnastics Championships	Rotterdam, The Netherlands	Uneven Bars		14.666 (team finals)	12	14.466
2010	World Gymnastics Championships	Rotterdam, The Netherlands	Balance Beam			21	14.266
2010	World Gymnastics Championships	Rotterdam, The Netherlands	Floor Exercise			39	13.533

Year	Competition Description	Location	Apparatus	Rank-Final	Score-Final	Rank-Qualifying	Score-Qualifying
2009	CoverGirl Classic	Des Moines, IA	Uneven Bars	9	13.350		
2009	U.S. Championships	Dallas, TX	All-Around	5	111.950	5	56.000
2009	U.S. Championships	Dallas, TX	Uneven bars	3	29.000	4	14.450
2009	U.S. Championships	Dallas, TX	Balance Beam	17	26.000	15	13.000
2009	U.S. Championships	Dallas, TX	Floor Exercise	10	27.350	9	13.850
2009	Toyota International	Toyota City, Japan	Uneven bars	2	14.675		
2009	Toyota International	Toyota City, Japan	Balance Beam	12	12.275		
2009	Toyota International	Toyota City, Japan	Floor Exercise	11	12.100		

Year	Competition Description	Location	Apparatus	Rank-Final	Score-Final	Rank-Qualifying	Score-Qualifying
2008	U.S. Olympic Team Trials	Philadelphia, PA	All Around			12	57.100
2008	U.S. Olympic Team Trials	Philadelphia, PA	Vault			6	14.950
2008	U.S. Olympic Team Trials	Philadelphia, PA	Uneven Bars			12	14.450
2008	U.S. Olympic Team Trials	Philadelphia, PA	Balance Beam			16	13.800
2008	U.S. Olympic Team Trials	Philadelphia, PA	Floor Exercise			18	13.900
2008	U.S. Championships	Boston, MA	All Around	10	114.850	8	58.100
2008	U.S. Championships	Boston, MA	Uneven Bars	10	28.950	8	14.400
2008	U.S. Championships	Boston, MA	Balance Beam	15	28.200	10	14.800
2008	U.S. Championships	Boston, MA	Floor Exercise	19	28.500	18	14.100
