= Gymnastics at the 1984 Summer Olympics – Women's floor =

Women's floor at the Games of the XXIII Olympiad
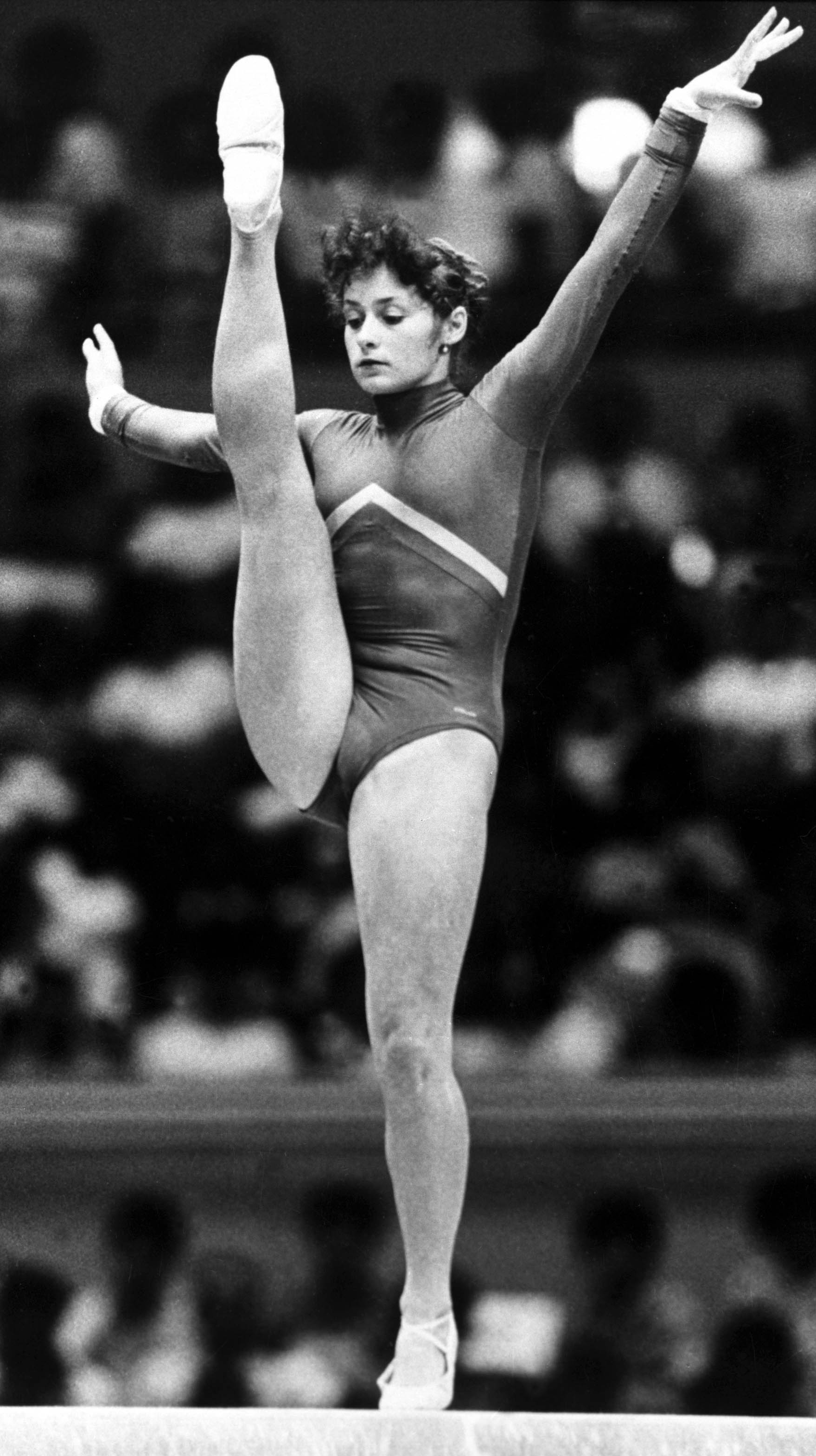
- Gold medalist Ecaterina Szabo (1985)
- Venue: UCLA's Pauley Pavilion

Medalists
1st place, gold medalist(s)		Ecaterina Szabo	Romania
2nd place, silver medalist(s)		Julianne McNamara	United States
3rd place, bronze medalist(s)		Mary Lou Retton	United States

These are the results of the women's floor competition, one of six events for female competitors in artistic gymnastics at the 1984 Summer Olympics in Los Angeles. The qualification and final rounds took place on July 30, August 1 and 5 at UCLA’s Pauley Pavilion.

== Results ==
Sixty-five gymnasts competed in the compulsory and optional rounds on July 30 and August 1. The eight highest scoring gymnasts advanced to the final on August 5. Each country was limited to two competitors in the final. Half of the points earned by each gymnast during both the compulsory and optional rounds carried over to the final. This constitutes the "prelim" score.

Rank	Gymnast	C	O	Prelim	Final	Total
Gold medal	Ecaterina Szabo (ROU)	10.000	9.950	9.975	10.000	19.975
Silver medal	Julianne McNamara (USA)	9.900	10.000	9.950	10.000	19.950
Bronze medal	Mary Lou Retton (USA)	9.950	9.900	9.925	9.850	19.775
4	Zhou Qiurui (CHN)	9.800	9.750	9.775	9.850	19.625
5	Romi Kessler (SUI)	9.650	9.800	9.725	9.850	19.575
6	Ma Yanhong (CHN)	9.800	9.700	9.750	9.700	19.450
7	Maiko Morio (JPN)	9.750	9.700	9.725	9.650	19.375
8	Laura Cutina (ROU)	9.800	9.900	9.850	9.300	19.150

Preceded by Gymnastics at the 1980 Summer Olympics – Women's floor	Women's Floor Exercise; 1984	Succeeded by Gymnastics at the 1988 Summer Olympics – Women's floor
