= Diane Moyer =

American field hockey player

Personal information
- Full name: Diane Marie Moyer
- Born: July 29, 1958 (age 67) Reading, Pennsylvania, U.S.
Medal record
Women's Field Hockey
Representing the United States
Olympic Games
Bronze medal – third place	1984 Los Angeles	Team competition

Diane Marie Moyer (born July 29, 1958, in Reading, Pennsylvania) is a former field hockey player for the United States women's team that won the bronze medal at the 1984 Summer Olympics in Los Angeles, California.

Moyer qualified for the 1980 Olympic team but did not compete due to the Olympic Committee's boycott of the 1980 Summer Olympics in Moscow, Russia. She was one of 461 athletes to receive a Congressional Gold Medal years later. When the United States hosted the Games in 1984, she once again represented her native country and was part of the bronze medal team.

She graduated from La Salle University and is currently a professor in the psychology department at Cedar Crest College in Allentown, Pennsylvania.
