= Anita Miller (field hockey) =

American field hockey player (born 1951)

Personal information
- Full name: Anita Corl Miller Huntsman
- Born: May 14, 1951 (age 75) Bryn Mawr, Pennsylvania, U.S.
Medal record
Women's Field Hockey
Representing the United States
Olympic Games
Bronze medal – third place	1984 Los Angeles	Team competition

Anita Corl Huntsman (born May 14, 1951) is an American former field hockey player who was a member of the Women's National Team that won the bronze medal at the 1984 Summer Olympics in Los Angeles, California. She had previously qualified for the 1980 Olympic team but did not compete due to the Olympic Committee's boycott of the 1980 Summer Olympics in Moscow, Russia. As consolation, she was one of 461 athletes to receive a Congressional Gold Medal many years later. Anita is also an avid horseback rider and teacher.
