= Yelena Davydova =

Russian-Canadian gymnast and gymnastics coach

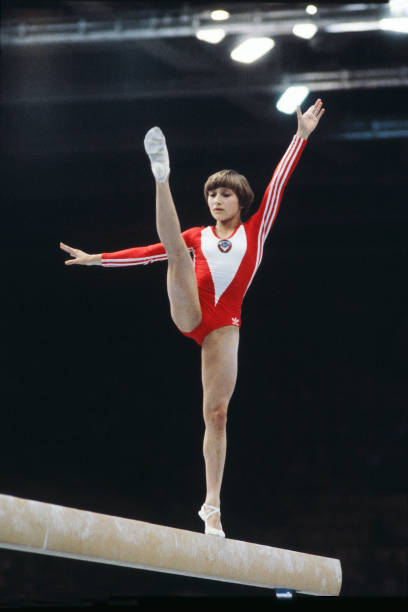
- Elena Davydova at the 1980 Olympic Games in Moscow.

Personal information
- Alternative name: Elena Davydova
- Born: 7 August 1961 (age 65) Voronezh, Soviet Union

Gymnastics career
- Discipline: Women's artistic gymnastics
- Country represented: Soviet Union
- Retired: 1982
Medal record
Representing Soviet Union
Olympic Games
Gold medal – first place	1980 Moscow	Team
Gold medal – first place	1980 Moscow	All-Around
Silver medal – second place	1980 Moscow	Balance Beam
World Championships
Gold medal – first place	1981 Moscow	Team
Silver medal – second place	1981 Moscow	Floor Exercise
Bronze medal – third place	1981 Moscow	All-Around
Bronze medal – third place	1981 Moscow	Uneven Bars

Yelena Viktorovna Davydova (Russian: Еле́на Ви́кторовна Давы́дова; born 7 August 1961) is a Russian-Canadian gymnastics coach and judge who competed for the former Soviet Union. She was the women's artistic individual all-around champion at the 1980 Summer Olympics in Moscow. She's the owner and head coach at Gemini Gymnastics, a gymnastics club in Oshawa, Ontario. In July 2012, Davydova was one of the coaches of the Canadian women’s artistic gymnastics team. In 2016 Davydova was head floor judge at the 2016 Rio Olympics.

In October 2016, she was elected a member of the International Gymnastics Federation's Women Technical Committee.

== Early life ==
Davydova was born in Voronezh, 500 kilometres south of Moscow, to Victor, a mechanic, and Tamara, an employee at the Leningrad Optical and Mechanical Works. She became interested in gymnastics at age six after seeing on television the famous Soviet Olympic gold medallists Larisa Petrik and Natalia Kuchinskaya. She wanted to be enrolled in Spartak Gymnastics school, but was turned away for having the wrong physique.

Soon a coach at the school, Gennadiy Korshunov, noticed her. He invited her into the school. He asked his wife, Ina, also a gymnastics coach at the school, to train Davydova in her group. Yuri Shtukman, the administrator at the school, did not like this initiative by his new training staff and reprimanded the Korshunovs; however he allowed Davydova to stay in the school. It soon became apparent that she was a talented gymnast and Gennadiy took over her coaching himself. By 1972 Davydova was the best in her age group at the school.

Davydova has a brother, Yuri, who is 12 years her junior.

== Gymnastics career ==
In 1973, Davydova won her first international tournament. In 1974 she became a member of the USSR junior squad. At the 1975 USSR Junior Championships Davydova finished 3rd AA and won golds on vault and bars. Following her success here she became a member of the senior squad. In March 1976 Davydova achieved second place all-around at the USSR championships, in her first try as a senior. She also won the gold on bars and a silver on floor. At the inaugural American Cup, Davydova performed a side somersault on the beam, the first woman ever to do so. However, she only received third place AA. At the USSR Cup Davydova tied for sixth place AA – and won bronze on vault, only 0.025 behind world vault champion Olga Korbut – but only the top five and one gymnast in ninth place were chosen for the Soviet Olympic team.

In August, Davydova won the Antibes tournament in France. In addition, she won gold on the vault, and silvers on beam, bars, and floor. At the Riga International she scored the highest per-routine score in the competition (9.75 on vault), and won silver in the AA competition. She dominated event finals, winning three gold (beam, vault, bars) and a bronze on floor. In October, she was made a member of the USSR gymnastics display team, which visited the UK. She subsequently performed her beam routine on the Blue Peter show.

In December 1976, Davydova finished third AA at the Chunichi Cup in Japan, and won a gold on vault and a bronze on floor at the Tokyo Cup. She was the only woman in the competition to perform a front somersault vault. She also tied for first AA with Kische and Kraker of East Germany. In 1977 Davydova again won the gold medal on bars at the USSR Cup, scoring a perfect 10.

In September 1977 Davydova appeared on the front cover of a new magazine with an emphasis on young gymnasts, entitled Gymnastics World. She was one of the four "Mighty Mites" featured in that issue. She was also a member of the USSR Display Team, along with Kim, Korbut, Grosdova, Filatova and Gorbik that performed in Great Britain.

Davydova suffered a serious injury when a bone detached itself from her knee. The injury could have been a career-ender, but she recovered.

In 1978, Gennady Korshunov and his wife were invited to coach gymnastics in Leningrad. Davydova and her family moved along with the Korshunov family. She achieved a silver AA at the Spartakiade of Russian Federation Sports Schools meet, and bronze AA at the USSR Cup, being the top scorer on both beam and bars. Shortly after, Davydova won the AA title at the prestigious Chunichi Cup in Japan defeating Maxi Gnauck. Her win by 0.55 points remains the joint third-highest margin of victory in the competition's 34-year history. She also won gold on the bars and vault at the Tokyo Cup. As a result, she was chosen to be a member of the USSR team at the World Championships at Strasbourg in France. However, on the day of competition she was named as an alternate, and unable to compete.

At the 1979 Coca-Cola International in England, Davydova won a gold on floor and but lost gold on bars, after her coach blocked the line of vision of one of the judges, and she suffered the mandatory 0.3 deduction. She finished second AA at the Simo Sappien memorial tournament in Finland. Davydova was unable to attend the 1979 World Championships in Fort Worth, U.S., because of influenza. At the World University Games in Mexico she won team gold, bronze AA, and a silver medal on floor and bronze on vault.

In 1979 Olga Korbut named Davydova, Stella Zakharova, and Natalia Shaposhnikova as the three most promising young gymnasts.

=== 1980 Olympic Games ===
At the 1980 Moscow News Tournament Davydova performed a full-on, full off vault. that had had only ever been done before by Olga Korbut. Davydova won a gold and 3 silver at the Moscow News Tournament. At the 1980 USSR Championships in April in Kiev Davydova won gold on vault- unveiling her unique vault full twist on, front somi off, scoring a 10 – and finished 3rd AA.

The Soviet Olympic gymnastics team was to be chosen after the USSR Cup competition. Davydova had finished joint 6th at the 1976 USSR Cup but that turned out to be insufficient to be placed on the team. Davydova won the all-around and scored a 10 on floor. Davydova subsequently was named to the Olympic team.

At the Olympics Davydova qualified for the all-around, vault and beam finals. The Soviet team won team gold and Davydova went on to win the all-around gold medal, and silver on the balance beam.

=== Post-Olympics ===
On 3 July 1981 in Montreux, the 100th anniversary celebration of the International Gymnastics Federation took place. Davydova was invited to perform her floor exercise. In August Davydova won the tournament in Giresum, Turkey. She won the AA title and was top scorer on vault, bars, floor and joint top scorer on beam. She scored 10's on bars and floor.

At the 1981 USSR Championships, Davydova won the All-Around title plus golds on floor and vault and bronze on bars. She also participated in the 1981 world championships, her last major international event. The USSR won team gold. Davydova suffered a serious neck injury in pre-competition warm up but still finished 3rd in the all-around with a fall and was the only gymnast from any nation to make all 4 event finals. She won silver on floor and bronze on bars.

Davydova remained on the Soviet display team until 1984 but retired from competitive gymnastics in late 1982. She was competing on vault at the Rome gymnastics Grand Prix in 82 when she injured her ankle. She didn't want to finish Elite competition gymnastics and talked of defending her Olympic title in L.A. but it became obvious as time went on that her body could no longer stand the pounding of intense workouts.

== After retirement ==
Davydova attended the Leningrad University of Physical Education and later received her doctorate in Pedagogical science at the P.F. Lesgraft State Institute of Athletic Education. The title of her thesis was "Nontraditional preparation of top gymnasts for competitions."

Davydova was part of the Saint Petersburg delegation that had bidden unsuccessfully to host the 2004 Olympic Games.

On 11 May 2007 Davydova was inducted into the International Gymnastics Hall of Fame (IGHOF).

=== Coaching career ===
Upon graduation in 1987, Davydova began coaching and served as an international brevet judge. She began her coaching career with the Leningrad Olympic reserve college and was a coach with the Soviet national gymnastics team.

Davydova now owns Gemini Gymnastics, a high performance gymnastics club in Oshawa, Ontario where she has been a coach since immigrating to Canada, and head coach since 1999. Some of her better known gymnasts include Stephanie Capucitti, Sarah Deegan, Danielle Hicks, Katherine Fairhurst, Kristina Vaculik, Brittnee Habbib, Kelsey Hope and Ava Stewart. She was beam coach for the Canadian women's team at the 1995 world championships and one of the Canadian women's team coaches at the 2002 Commonwealth Games. Davydova was twice named Gymnastics Canada Gymnastique coach of the year. In October 2005 Davydova was chosen for the Coaching Association of Canada's Women in Coaching National Team Coaching Apprenticeship Program.

In 2005, 2006 and 2010 Gymnastics Canada Gymnastique awarded Davydova and long-time associate coach, Valery Yahchybekov, as the "Junior High Performance Coaches of the Year". Gemini Gymnastics has been recognised by GCG as Club of Excellence for 10 consecutive years since the inception of the awards in 2001. In 2006 Gemini received the prestigious Gymnastics Canada Ed Broughan award for "Club of the Year". As of 2012 Gemini have produced 15 Canadian AA champions,8 Elite Canada AA champions, 21 Eastern Canada AA champions, 98 Ontario provincial AA champions plus gymnasts who have won a host of other medals and awards. In 2012 Gemini was awarded a Club of Excellence award, 1 of only 4 recognised across Canada, and 1 of 2 to earn the highest gold level honour. In April 2012 Davydova was named Ontario's Coach of the Year.

In 2012, Kristina Vaculik, who was coached by Elena and Valery Yahchybekov at Gemini Gymnastics, was named to the Canadian Olympic team for the London 2012 Summer Olympic Games.

Davydova coached Canadian gymnast Ava Stewart at the 2020 Summer Olympic Games in Tokyo.

=== Gymnastics Judge ===
Davydova became a gymnastics judge in 2005, one of several Olympic all-around champions to do so (alongside Latynina, Čáslavská, Tourischeva, etc.)

In August, 2016, Davydova represented Canada as a judge at the 2016 Rio Olympics in Women's Artistic Gymnastics. She was named as head judge for the women's floor events at the Olympics. In October 2016, she became a member of FIG's Women's Technical Committee, again representing Canada.

=== Suspension and Resumption of Activity ===
In November 2023, Gymnastics Canada temporarily suspended Davydova pending an investigation by the Office of the Sport Integrity Commissioner (OSIC) into alleged maltreatment as a coach. She was later permitted to resume coaching athletes under the age of 25, provided it is done under supervision, while awaiting a final decision on the case. During this time, she was unable to renew her position on the Women's Technical Committee and was replaced.

== Legacy ==
Davydova advanced the difficulty of gymnastics, and is one of a select few to have introduced a new move and/or trend on each piece of apparatus. Davydova was the first female gymnast to perform an Arabian 1¾ somersault, and a piked Arabian 1¾ somersault on floor (both Arabian 1¾ moves removed from the code of points for female gymnasts by the FIG in 1993 for safety reasons, effectively banned because of their danger and difficulty.

=== Eponymous skills ===
Davydova has two eponymous skills listed in the Code of Points.

Apparatus	Name	Description	Difficulty (Note: Valid for the 2025–2028 Code of Points)
Vault	Davydova	Handspring forward with 1/1 turn (360°) on – tucked salto forward off	4.8
Uneven bars	Davydova	Long swing forward, counter straddle-reverse hecht over high bar to hang (Note: Commonly referred to as a Tkatchev)	D

== Competitive History ==
Year	Event	AA	Team	VT	UB	BB	FX
1976	USSR Championships	2nd		3rd			
1977	USSR Championships				1st		
1978	USSR Championships				3rd		
1978	USSR Cup	3rd					
1980	USSR Championships	1st					
1980	USSR Cup	1st					
1980	Olympics	1st	1st			2nd	
1981	World Championships	3rd	1st		3rd		2nd
1981	USSR Championships	1st		1st	3rd		1st

== Personal life ==
Davydova married boxing coach Pavel Filatov on 1 June 1983. They have two sons, Dmitrii (born 21 February 1985) and Anton (28 June 1995). The family moved to Canada in 1991.
