= 1983 European Women's Artistic Gymnastics Championships =

14th European Women's Artistic Gymnastics Championships
- Location: Gothenburg, Sweden
- Dates: 7–8 May 1983

The 14th European Women's Artistic Gymnastics Championships were held in Gothenburg, Sweden on 7-8 May 1983.

== Medalists ==
Event	Gold	Silver	Bronze
Seniors
All-around	Olga Bicherova (URS)	Lavinia Agache (ROU)	Albina Shishova (URS); Ecaterina Szabo (ROU)
Vault	Olga Bicherova (URS)	Ecaterina Szabo (ROU)	Lavinia Agache (ROU); Boriana Stoyanova (BUL)
Uneven bars	Ecaterina Szabo (ROU)	Lavinia Agache (ROU)	Jana Labáková (TCH)
Balance beam	Lavinia Agache (ROU)	Astrid Heese (GDR)	Mihaela Stănuleț (ROU)
Floor	Olga Bicherova (URS); Ecaterina Szabo (ROU)		Boriana Stoyanova (BUL)

== Results ==
=== All-around ===
Rank	Gymnast	Total
1st place, gold medalist(s)	Olga Bicherova (URS)	39.15
2nd place, silver medalist(s)	Lavinia Agache (ROU)	39.10
3rd place, bronze medalist(s)	Albina Shishova (URS)	38.90
3rd place, bronze medalist(s)	Ecaterina Szabo (ROU)	38.90
5	Astrid Heese (GDR)	38.55
6	Zoya Grancharova (BUL)	38.50
6	Silvia Rau (GDR)	38.50
8	Jana Labáková (TCH)	38.40

=== Vault ===
Rank	Gymnast	Total
1st place, gold medalist(s)	Olga Bicherova (URS)	19.650
2nd place, silver medalist(s)	Ecaterina Szabo (ROU)	19.525
3rd place, bronze medalist(s)	Lavinia Agache (ROU)	19.500
3rd place, bronze medalist(s)	Boriana Stoyanova (BUL)	19.500
5	Albina Shishova (URS)	19.450
6	Astrid Heese (GDR)	19.300
7	Zoya Grancharova (BUL)	19.275
8	Silvia Rau (GDR)	19.225

=== Uneven bars ===
Rank	Gymnast	Total
1st place, gold medalist(s)	Ecaterina Szabo (ROU)	19.70
2nd place, silver medalist(s)	Lavinia Agache (ROU)	19.50
3rd place, bronze medalist(s)	Jana Labáková (TCH)	19.45
4	Silvia Rau (GDR)	19.40
4	Albina Shishova (URS)	19.40
6	Zoya Grancharova (BUL)	19.30
6	Galina Marinova (BUL)	19.30
8	Hana Říčná (TCH)	19.20

=== Balance beam ===
Rank	Gymnast	Total
1st place, gold medalist(s)	Lavinia Agache (ROU)	19.65
2nd place, silver medalist(s)	Astrid Heese (GDR)	19.40
3rd place, bronze medalist(s)	Mihaela Stănuleț (ROU)	19.20
4	Natalia Yurchenko (URS)	19.05
5	Silvia Rau (GDR)	19.00
6	Albina Shishova (URS)	18.80
7	Martina Polcrová (TCH)	18.70
8	Jana Labáková (TCH)	18.50

=== Floor ===
Rank	Gymnast	Total
1st place, gold medalist(s)	Olga Bicherova (URS)	19.80
1st place, gold medalist(s)	Ecaterina Szabo (ROU)	19.80
3rd place, bronze medalist(s)	Boriana Stoyanova (BUL)	19.75
4	Zoya Grancharova (BUL)	19.60
4	Natalia Yurchenko (URS)	19.60
6	Astrid Heese (GDR)	19.35
6	Hana Říčná (TCH)	19.35
8	Lavinia Agache (ROU)	19.00
