= Birgit Senff =

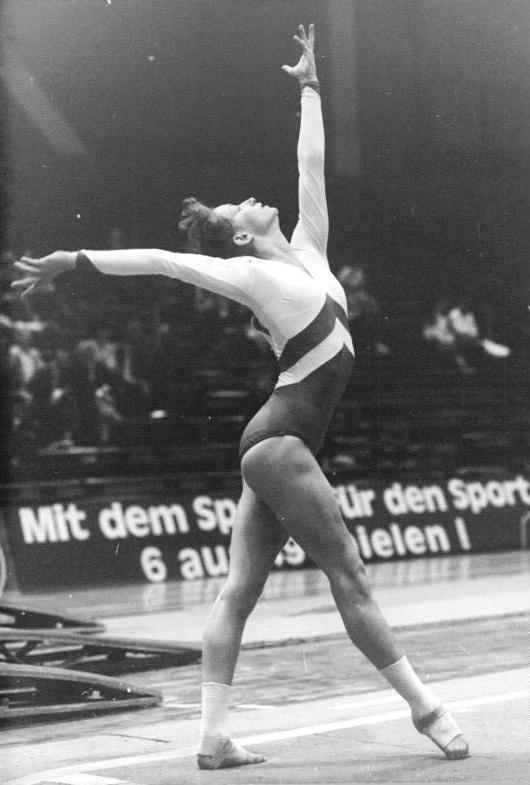
- Birgit Senff in 1984

Sport
- Sport: Artistic gymnastics
- Club: SC Leipzig
Medal record
Representing East Germany
Friendship Games
Silver medal – second place	1984 Olomouc	Team
World Championships
Bronze medal – third place	1981 Moscow	Team
European Championships
Silver medal – second place	1981 Madrid	Vault

Birgit Senff is a retired German artistic gymnast. In 1981 she won a silver medal in the vault at the European Championships and a team bronze at the world championships. She missed the 1984 Summer Olympics due to their boycott by the Soviet bloc and competed at the Friendship Games instead, winning a silver medal with the East German team.

Nationally, she won the vault in 1981, 1983 and 1984 and the uneven bars in 1984.
