= Leslie Milne (field hockey) =

American field hockey player

Personal information
- Full name: Leslie Woods Milne
- Born: October 17, 1956 (age 69) Framingham, Massachusetts, U.S.
- Education: Williams College
Medal record
Women's Field Hockey
Representing the United States
Olympic Games
Bronze medal – third place	1984 Los Angeles	Team competition

Leslie Woods Milne (born October 17, 1956, in Framingham, Massachusetts) is a former field hockey player from the United States, who was a member of the national team that won the bronze medal at the 1984 Summer Olympics in Los Angeles, California. She had previously qualified for the 1980 Olympic team but did not compete due to the Olympic Committee's boycott of the 1980 Summer Olympics in Moscow, Russia. As consolation, she was one of 461 athletes to receive a Congressional Gold Medal many years later.
