= Kathleen McGahey =

American field hockey player

Personal information
- Full name: Kathleen Ann McGahey
- Nickname: Kathy
- Born: March 5, 1960 (age 66) Philadelphia, Pennsylvania, U.S.
Medal record
Women's Field Hockey
Representing the United States
Olympic Games
Bronze medal – third place	1984 Los Angeles	Team competition

Kathleen Ann "Kathy" McGahey (born March 5, 1960, in Philadelphia, Pennsylvania) is a former field hockey player from the United States, who was a member of the Women's National Team that won the bronze medal at the 1984 Summer Olympics in Los Angeles, California.
