= Greg Losey =

American modern pentathlete (1950–2002)

Personal information
- Born: Robert Gregory Losey; February 9, 1950 Oakland, California, United States
- Died: February 26, 2002 (aged 52) San Antonio, Texas, United States

Sport
- Sport: Modern pentathlon
- College team: United States Military Academy-Westpoint

Achievements and titles
- Olympic finals: 1984
Medal record
Men's modern pentathlon
Representing the United States
Olympic Games
Silver medal – second place	1984 Los Angeles	Team

Greg Losey (February 9, 1950 – February 26, 2002) was an American modern pentathlete. He competed at the 1984 Summer Olympics, winning a silver medal in the team event.
