= Arn Kritsky =

American weightlifter (born 1961)

Personal information
- Born: August 25, 1961 (age 64) Vienna, Virginia, United States

Sport
- Sport: Weightlifting

Arn Kritsky (born August 25, 1961) is an American weightlifter. He competed at the 1984 Summer Olympics and the 1988 Summer Olympics.
