= Dean Glenesk =

American modern pentathlete (born 1957)

Dean William Glenesk
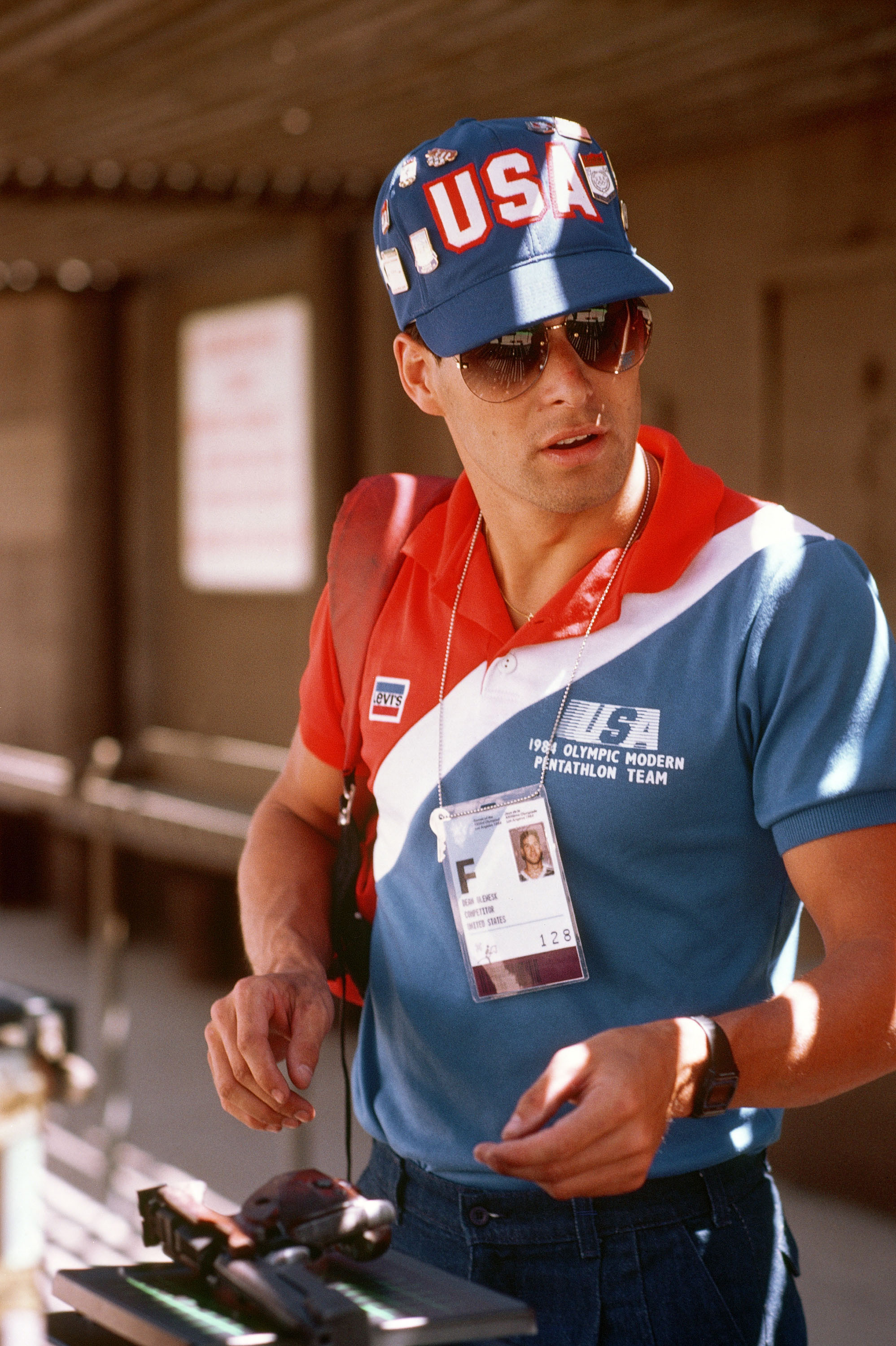
- Glenesk in 1984

Personal information
- Born: September 22, 1957 (age 68) La Grange, Illinois, United States

Sport
- Sport: Modern pentathlon
Medal record
Men's modern pentathlon
Representing United States
Olympic Games
Silver medal – second place	1984 Los Angeles	Team

Dean William Glenesk (born September 22, 1957) is an American former modern pentathlete.

== Olympics ==
Glenesk qualified for the 1980 U.S. Olympic team but was unable to compete due to the U.S. Olympic Committee's boycott of the 1980 Summer Olympics in Moscow, Russia. He was one of 461 athletes to receive a Congressional Gold Medal many years later. He did, however, compete in the 1984 Summer Olympics, winning a silver medal in the team event.
