= Michael Storm (pentathlete) =

American modern pentathlete (born 1959)

Personal information
- Born: August 22, 1959 (age 66) Arlington, Virginia, United States

Sport
- Sport: Modern pentathlon
Medal record
Men's modern pentathlon
Representing United States
Olympic Games
Silver medal – second place	1984 Los Angeles	Team

Michael Storm (born August 22, 1959) is an American former modern pentathlete. He competed at the 1984 Summer Olympics, winning a silver medal in the team event. Storm graduated from the University of Pennsylvania in 1986 with a Bachelor of Arts degree and from Harvard Business School in 1989.
