= Wu Jiani =

Chinese artistic gymnast

- Born: 23 April 1966 (age 60) Shanghai, China
- Height: 162 cm (5 ft 4 in)

Gymnastics career
- Discipline: Women's artistic gymnastics
- Country represented: China
Medal record
Olympic Games
| Bronze medal – third place | 1984 Los Angeles | Team |
World Championships
| Silver medal – second place | 1981 Moscow | Team |
| Bronze medal – third place | 1981 Moscow | Balance Beam |
World Cup Final
| Silver medal – second place | 1982 Zagreb | Balance beam |
Asian Games
| Gold medal – first place | 1982 Delhi | Team |
| Gold medal – first place | 1982 Delhi | Uneven bars |
| Gold medal – first place | 1982 Delhi | Balance beam |
| Silver medal – second place | 1982 Delhi | All-around |
| Silver medal – second place | 1982 Delhi | Floor |
National Games
| Gold medal – first place | 1983 Shanghai | All-around |

Wu Jiani (simplified Chinese: 吴佳妮; traditional Chinese: 吳佳妮; pinyin: Wú Jiānī, born 23 April 1966) is a former female Chinese gymnast. Wu was born in Shanghai. She started gymnastic training in 1928, and was admitted into Shanghai gymnastic team in 1986, and Chinese national team in 1988.

Wu competed at 1984 Olympic Games, and won a bronze medal in Women's Team competition. She qualified to the all-around, uneven bars and balance beam finals, but had to withdraw from all of them due to dislocating her elbow after the team competition. She was a five-time Chinese National Champion and a World Championship bronze medalist on beam in 1981.

Wu Jiani Salto is a skill of uneven bars with C value. This skill was banned due to the development of the apparatus.

Her husband is Li Yuejiu, also a famed gymnast and an Olympic medalist. One of their daughters is Anna Li, who competed for the UCLA Bruins gymnastics team during the 2007 through 2010 seasons and at the same Pauley Pavilion where her parents won the Olympic medals. Following the Visa Championships and two selection camps at the Karolyi Ranch in New Waverly, Texas, Anna Li was named to the gold medal winning U.S. 2011 World Championship Team. An injury kept her from competing. In 2012, she was named an alternate to the 2012 Olympic Games.

Andrea Li, the youngest daughter who is also a gymnast for junior competitions such as Nastia Liukin Cup and Junior Olympic Championships.

Along with their daughter, Wu and Li have been the coaches for several elite athletes, including the Caquatto sisters: World Silver Medalist Mackenzie Caquatto and Pan American Games triple Gold Medalist Bridgette Caquatto. In April 2009, they opened Legacy Elite Gymnastics in Aurora, Illinois together to train local gymnasts.
