= Kōji Gushiken =

Japanese gymnast (born 1956)

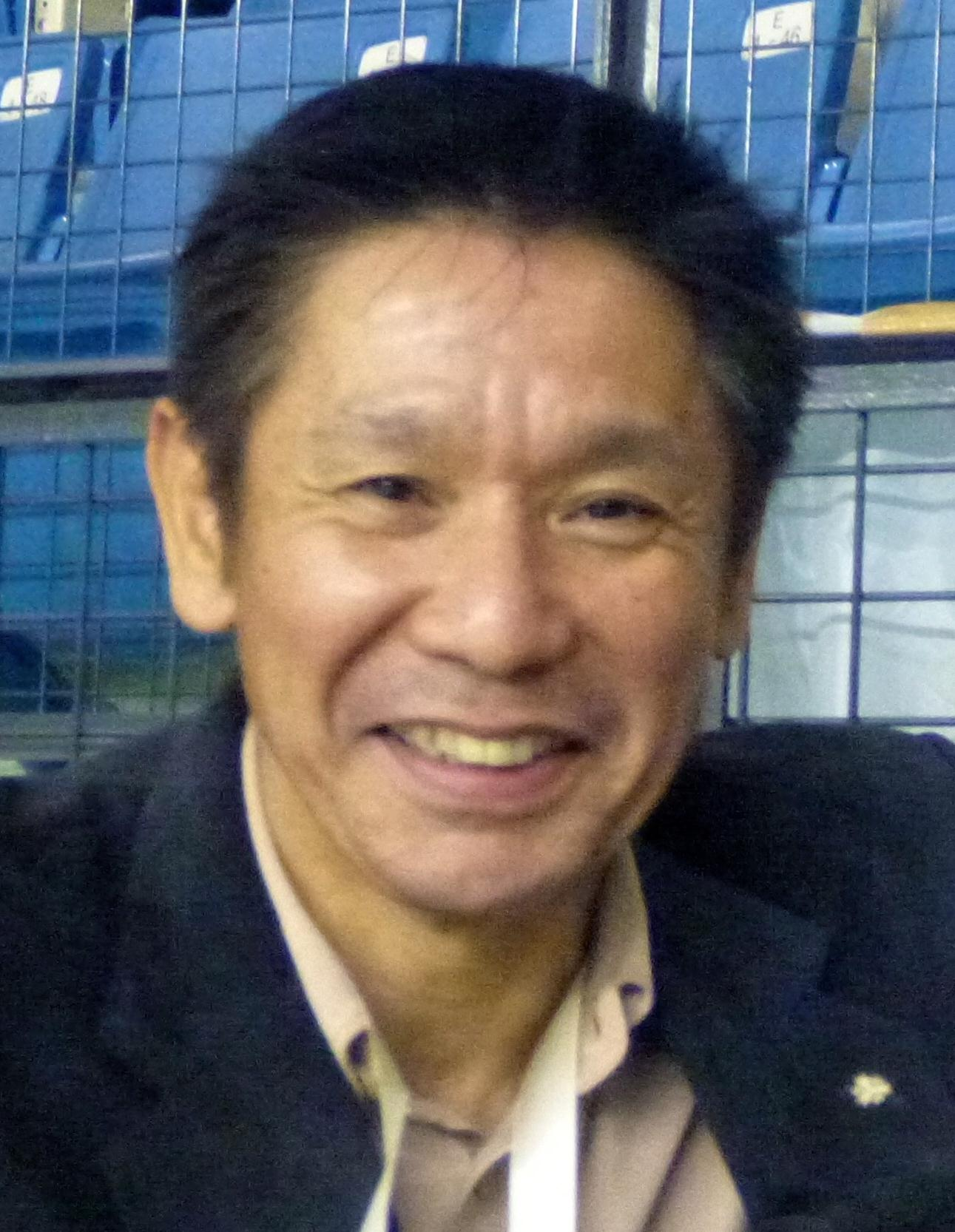
- Gushiken in 2011

Personal information
- Born: November 12, 1956 (age 69)

Gymnastics career
- Discipline: Men's artistic gymnastics
- Country represented: Japan
- Head coach: Hikonori Yamaguchi
- Retired: 1985 Chūnichi Cup
Medal record
Olympic Games
Gold medal – first place	1984 Los Angeles	All-Around Individual
Gold medal – first place	1984 Los Angeles	Rings
Silver medal – second place	1984 Los Angeles	Vault
Bronze medal – third place	1984 Los Angeles	Horizontal Bar
Bronze medal – third place	1984 Los Angeles	Team competition
World Championships
Gold medal – first place	1981 Moscow	Parallel bars
Gold medal – first place	1983 Budapest	Rings
Silver medal – second place	1979 Ft. Worth	Team
Silver medal – second place	1981 Moscow	Team
Silver medal – second place	1983 Budapest	All-around
Bronze medal – third place	1979 Ft. Worth	Pommel horse
Bronze medal – third place	1981 Moscow	All-around
Bronze medal – third place	1981 Moscow	Floor
Bronze medal – third place	1983 Budapest	Team
Bronze medal – third place	1985 Montreal	Parallel bars
Asian Games
Gold medal – first place	1982 New Delhi	Parallel Bars
Silver medal – second place	1982 New Delhi	Team
Silver medal – second place	1982 New Delhi	Vault

Kōji Gushiken (具志堅 幸司, Gushiken Kōji) (born November 12, 1956, in Ōsaka) is an Olympic gymnast for Japan at the 1984 Summer Olympics in Los Angeles, California, where he won a total number of five medals, including two gold. He broke an ankle in May 1985 which prevented him from training for 3 months and hindered his performances at the 1985 World Championships. Gushiken announced his retirement at the 1985 Chūnichi Cup. He currently coaches other Olympic contenders, including two-time Olympic individual all-around gold medallist Kōhei Uchimura.
