= Li Yuejiu =

Chinese artistic gymnast

- 李月久
- Born: 4 July 1957 (age 69) Yingkou, Liaoning, China
- Spouse: Wu Jiani
- Relatives: Anna Li (daughter)

Gymnastics career
- Discipline: Men's artistic gymnastics
- Country represented: China
Medal record
Men's artistic gymnastics
Representing China
Event	1st	2nd	3rd
Olympic Games	0	1	0
World Championships	2	0	1
Total	2	1	1
Olympic Games
Silver medal – second place	1984 Los Angeles	Team
World Championships
Gold medal – first place	1981 Moscow	Floor
Gold medal – first place	1983 Budapest	Team
Bronze medal – third place	1981 Moscow	Team
Asian Games
Gold medal – first place	1978 Bangkok	Team
Gold medal – first place	1978 Bangkok	Floor Exercise
Gold medal – first place	1982 New Delhi	Team
Silver medal – second place	1978 Bangkok	Horizontal Bar
Silver medal – second place	1982 New Delhi	Floor Exercise
Bronze medal – third place	1978 Bangkok	All-Around

Li Yuejiu (Chinese: 李月久; pinyin: Lǐ Yuèjiǔ; born July 4, 1957) is a male Chinese former gymnast.

== Gymnastics career ==
Li was born in Liaoning Province. He competed at the 1984 Olympic Games, and won a silver medal in the Men's Team competition. He was China's first World Champion in floor exercise in 1981. Li retired in October 1984.

== Coaching career ==
He went on to study in Canada, and became a coach for the Canadian national gymnastics team. He married in 1986. Later, he and his wife coached in Las Vegas in the United States.

He was the coordinator of the 2008 Chinese men's and women's Olympic teams and led both teams to an Olympic gold medal, as well as the 2006 World Championship team title.

Li and Wu Jiani were the coaches for World Silver Medalist Mackenzie Caquatto from 2004. In April 2009, they opened Legacy Elite Gymnastics in Carol Stream, Illinois.

== Personal life ==
Li's wife is Wu Jiani, also a famed Chinese gymnast whom he met at the gym of the Chinese National Training Center. One of their daughters is Anna Li, who competed for the UCLA Bruins gymnastics team during the 2007 – 2010 seasons at the same Pauley Pavilion where her parents won their Olympic medals. Following the Visa Championships and two selection camps at the Karolyi Ranch in New Waverly, Texas, Anna Li was named to the U.S. 2011 World Championship Team.
