= Jana Labáková =

Slovak gymnast (born 1966)

Personal information
- Nationality: Slovak
- Born: 26 January 1966 (age 60) Detva, Czechoslovakia

Sport
- Sport: Gymnastics
Medal record
Artistic Gymnastics
Representing Czechoslovakia
European Championships
Bronze medal – third place	1983 Gothenburg	uneven bars

Jana Labáková (married Valachová, born 26 January 1966) is a Slovak gymnast. She competed at the 1980 Summer Olympics, where she placed 4th with the Czechoslovak team in the team all around, 11th in the individual all around, and 6th in the floor final.

She won bronze medal on uneven bars at the 1983 European Championships.
