= Lavinia Agache =

Romanian gymnast (born 1968)

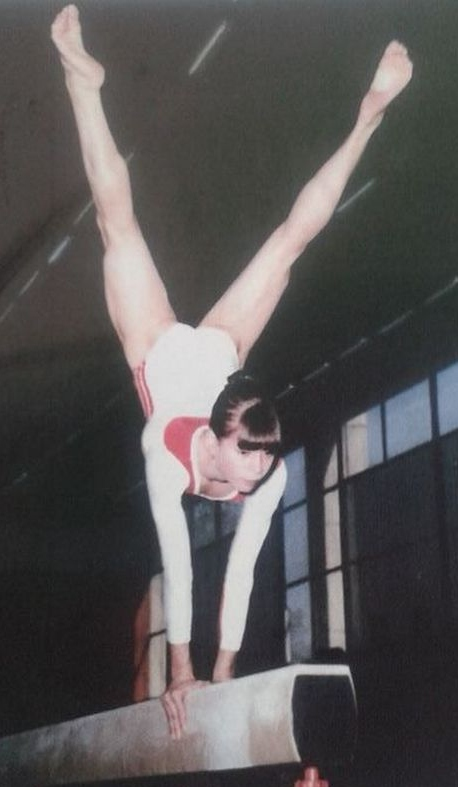
- Agache in the 1980s

Personal information
- Full name: Lavinia Agache
- Born: 11 February 1968 (age 58) Căiuți, Romania
- Height: 148 cm (4 ft 10 in)

Gymnastics career
- Discipline: Women's artistic gymnastics
- Country represented: Romania (1980–85 (ROM))
- Gym: Deva National Training Center
- Former coaches: Octavian Bellu, Maria Cosma, Adrian Goreac, Béla Károlyi, Marta Károlyi
Medal record
Olympic Games
Gold medal – first place	1984 Los Angeles	Team
Bronze medal – third place	1984 Los Angeles	Vault
World Championships
Silver medal – second place	1983 Budapest	Team
Silver medal – second place	1983 Budapest	Vault
Silver medal – second place	1983 Budapest	Uneven bars
Bronze medal – third place	1983 Budapest	Balance beam
European Championships
Gold medal – first place	1983 Gothenburg	Balance beam
Silver medal – second place	1983 Gothenburg	All-around
Silver medal – second place	1983 Gothenburg	Uneven bars
Bronze medal – third place	1983 Gothenburg	Vault
World Cup Final
Silver medal – second place	1982 Zagreb	Floor Exercise
Bronze medal – third place	1982 Zagreb	All-Around

Lavinia Agache (later Carney; born 11 February 1968) is a retired Romanian artistic gymnast. She won 10 medals at major international events, including a team gold medal at the 1984 Olympics and three silver medals at the 1983 World Championships (team, vault and uneven bars). She is also the 1983 European champion on balance beam.

== Gymnastics career ==
Agache took up gymnastics aged seven with Mihai Agoston and Maria Cosma. She was then coached by Béla and Márta Károlyi before their defection to the United States, and later by Octavian Bellu, Adrian Goreac and Maria Cosma. She won the all-around bronze at the 1980 Junior European Championships and the 1981 International Japan Junior Invitational.

In 1981, thirteen year old Agache was entered to compete in the International Gymnastics Classic in Los Angeles under the name Ekaterina Szabo. Szabo was another gymnast on the Romanian team. The reason for the deception is unclear because Agache could have competed under her own name if Romanian gymnastics officials had simply entered her into the competition. Both Agache and Szabo were well-known to international gymnastics officials and judges, which made the attempt to pass off Agache as Szabo even more baffling. She tied Julianne McNamara for second place, but her scores were invalidated after the competition. Three years later, Agache and Szabo were both on the gold medal winning Romanian team at the 1984 Olympics.

Agache won three individual medals at the 1983 World Championships (silver on vault and uneven bars; bronze on beam) and a team silver medal, and four medals at the 1983 European Championships (gold on beam, silver in the all-around and on uneven bars, and bronze on vault). At the 1984 Olympics in Los Angeles, in addition to the team gold medal, she won the bronze medal on vault. This was a disappointing medal toll for Agache, however, as she had the opportunity to win medals on every event and in the all-around after winning the compulsory round of team competition, but suffered falls on three of the four events during the optional rounds (bars, beam, and floor). She semi-retired in 1984 after a knee injury, but returned in 1991 to compete in the first World Professional Championships. After that she participated in numerous gymnastics shows in the United States, and eventually married and became a gymnastics coach there. Lavinia is married to Manuel Ramos jr., an ENT doctor, and has four nieces. One of her nieces was a competitive gymnast who later switched to diving.
