= Peter Vidmar =

American gymnast (born 1961)

- Full name: Peter Glen Vidmar
- Born: June 3, 1961 (age 65) Los Angeles, California, U.S.
- Height: 165 cm (5 ft 5 in)

Gymnastics career
- Discipline: Men's artistic gymnastics
- Country represented: United States
- College team: UCLA Bruins
Medal record
Men's artistic gymnastics
Representing United States
Event	1st	2nd	3rd
Olympic Games	2	1	0
World Championships	0	0	1
Total	2	1	1
Olympic Games
Gold medal – first place	1984 Los Angeles	Team
Gold medal – first place	1984 Los Angeles	Pommel horse
Silver medal – second place	1984 Los Angeles	All-around
World Championships
Bronze medal – third place	1979 Fort Worth	Team

Peter Glen Vidmar (born June 3, 1961, in Los Angeles) is an American gymnast and two-time Olympic gold medalist. He was a member of the United States men's national artistic gymnastics team and won gold in the team final and pommel horse, and silver in the individual all-around.

== Olympics ==
At age 18, Vidmar was the youngest member of the U.S. team that won a bronze medal in the 1979 World Championships. He qualified for the 1980 Olympic team, but did not compete due to the U.S. Olympic Committee's boycott of the 1980 Summer Olympics in Moscow, Russia. Vidmar was one of 461 athletes to receive a Congressional Gold Medal.

At the 1984 Summer Olympic games in Los Angeles, Vidmar won gold medals in the men's all-around team competition and the pommel horse competition, and a silver medal in the men's all-around individual gymnastics competition. With three Olympic medals, he is one of three athletes inducted into the U.S. Olympic Hall of Fame twice. He was inducted as an individual, then as a member of the 1984 U.S. men's gymnastics team.

== UCLA ==
He is an alumnus of UCLA. In 1983, Vidmar won the Nissen Award (the "Heisman" of men's gymnastics).

== Career ==
Vidmar hosts the annual Peter Vidmar Men's Gymnastics Invitational at Brentwood School in Los Angeles. He has been a gymnastics anchor for both CBS and ESPN. He is currently a motivational speaker as well as a co-chairman of the U.S. Olympic Committee Summer Sports Summit. In 1998 Vidmar was inducted into the International Gymnastics Hall of Fame.

== Personal life ==
Vidmar and his wife, Donna, have five children. He is a member of The Church of Jesus Christ of Latter-day Saints.

== 2012 Olympics ==
Vidmar was selected to be the chef de mission for the 2012 Olympics, where he would have represented all U.S. athletes and marched in the opening ceremonies. His selection drew criticism from LGBT activists and athletes, including Olympic figure skater Johnny Weir, because in 2008 Vidmar donated money to and publicly campaigned for Proposition 8 that banned same-sex couples from being married in California. Vidmar resigned his position to avoid his presence from being detrimental to the U.S. Olympics.

== U.S. Gymnastics ==
Vidmar was named chairman of the U.S. Gymnastics Board of Directors in December 2008. He left his role at USA Gymnastics in December 2015 to serve as a mission president for the LDS Church in the Australia Melbourne Mission.
