= 1981 European Women's Artistic Gymnastics Championships =

13th European Women's Artistic Gymnastics Championships
- Location: Madrid, Spain
- Dates: 2–3 May 1981

The 13th European Women's Artistic Gymnastics Championships were held in Madrid, Spain on 2–3 May 1981.

== Medalists ==
Event	Gold	Silver	Bronze
Seniors
All-Around	Maxi Gnauck (GDR)	Cristina Grigoraș (ROU)	Alla Misnik (URS)
Vault	Cristina Grigoraș (ROU)	Maxi Gnauck (GDR); Birgit Senff (GDR)	
Uneven Bars	Maxi Gnauck (GDR)	Cristina Grigoraș (ROU); Alla Misnik (URS)	
Balance Beam	Maxi Gnauck (GDR)	Natalia Ilienko (URS)	Rodica Dunca (ROU)
Floor	Maxi Gnauck (GDR)	Alla Misnik (URS)	Cristina Grigoraș (ROU)
