= Julianne McNamara =

American artistic gymnast

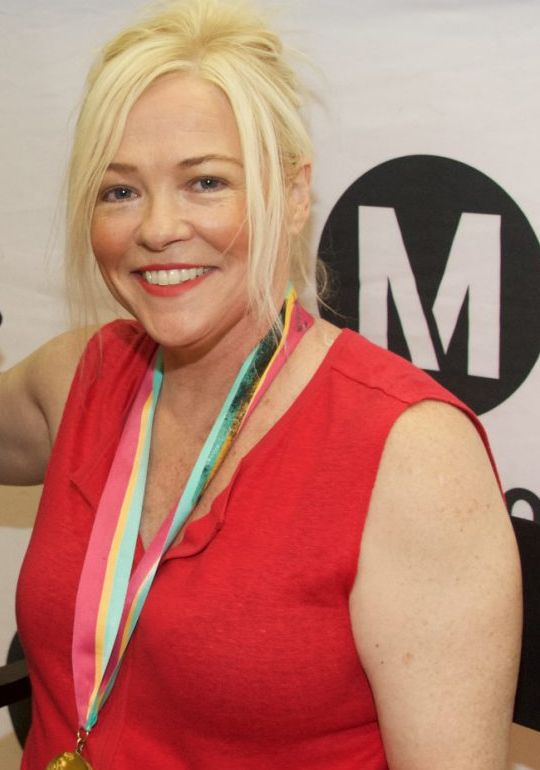

Personal information
- Full name: Julianne Lyn McNamara
- Born: October 11, 1965 (age 60) Flushing, Queens, New York, United States
- Height: 4 ft 10 in (147 cm)
- Spouse: Todd Zeile (1989–2015)

Gymnastics career
- Discipline: Women's artistic gymnastics
- Country represented: United States
- Eponymous skills: Uneven Bars: Jump to clear support on high bar - clear hip circle to handstand on high bar also with ½ turn (180°) in handstand phase on high bar
- Retired: 1987
Medal record
Women's gymnastics
Representing the United States
Olympic Games
Gold medal – first place	1984 Los Angeles	Uneven Bars
Silver medal – second place	1984 Los Angeles	Team
Silver medal – second place	1984 Los Angeles	Floor
World Championships
Bronze medal – third place	1981 Moscow	Uneven Bars
World Cup Final
Bronze medal – third place	1982 Zagreb	Vault

Julianne Lyn McNamara (born October 11, 1965) is an American former artistic gymnast, who was born to Australians Jean and Kevin McNamara. She was the winner of the U.S. women's first individual event gold medal in Olympic history.

== Career ==
McNamara won the 1980 US all-around title and qualified for the 1980 Olympic team but did not compete due to the United States Olympic Committee's boycott of the 1980 Summer Olympics in Moscow, Russia. As consolation, she was one of 461 athletes to receive a Congressional Gold Medal many years later. A year later, at the World Championships that were coincidentally also held in Moscow, McNamara notched the top U.S. women's world all-around finish (seventh place) at that point in history. She also earned a bronze medal on bars, a seventh on floor and finished fifth on beam.

At the 1982 World Cup, McNamara fell off the bars to place eighth all-around. In finals, however, she earned a bronze on vault and a seventh place on beam. In 1982, The Flower Council of Holland, headed by namesake Dutch Queen Juliana, christened the Julianne McNamara rose. At the time, the only other American woman to be so honored was the then U.S. First Lady Nancy Reagan.

The climax of McNamara's athletic career was at the 1984 Olympic Games in Los Angeles. There, she tied Ma Yanhong from China for first on the uneven bars (both gymnasts scored 10.00), won the silver on floor, and placed fourth all-around. As of the 2020 Olympic Games in Tokyo, she is the only American to win gold in the uneven bars event.

== Retirement ==
Although the 1984 Olympics was her last formal competition, McNamara did not retire officially until 1987. Her international accomplishments are considered to have played a major role in spotlighting the U.S. women's team in the early 1980s. She also starred in the TV Show Knight Rider, Season 4, "Knight Behind Bars" as lead character Julie Rogers.

Upon her retirement from gymnastics, McNamara embarked on an acting career, appearing in television shows such as Charles in Charge and Knight Rider. She played the role of Noreen in the 1990 film Monday Morning. She also did color commentary for some television gymnastics coverage.

In 1989, McNamara married baseball player Todd Zeile, whom she met while attending UCLA. She retired from her acting career and the couple had four children together: sons Garrett, Ian, and Aaron; and daughter Hannah, who appeared as teenage Kate Pearson on This Is Us. McNamara and Zeile divorced in January 2015.

She was inducted to the International Gymnastics Hall of Fame as a member of the Class of 2024. She reflected on her career in her induction speech which she gave on May 18 in Oklahoma City, Oklahoma:

It's probably one of the greatest honors of my life because I'm old now and you think people forget about you.. after my gymnastics career, my life turned in a different direction... I kind of ran away from the sport in a sense...I loved it with all my heart and I still miss doing it but as the years have gone by I'm just extremely grateful to be a part of this community.

== Eponymous skill ==
McNamara has one eponymous skill listed in the Code of Points, an uneven bars mount.

Apparatus	Name	Description	Difficulty (Note: Valid for the 2025-2028 Code of Points)
Uneven bars	McNamara	Jump to clear support on high bar - clear hip circle to handstand on high bar also with ½ turn (180°) in handstand phase on high bar	D
