= Gymnastics at the 1988 Summer Olympics – Men's parallel bars =

Olympic gymnastics event

Men's parallel bars at the Games of the XXIV Olympiad
- Artistic gymnastics pictogram
- Venue: Olympic Gymnastics Hall
- Dates: 18–24 September 1988
- Competitors: 89 from 23 nations
- Winning score: 19.925

Medalists
1st place, gold medalist(s)		Vladimir Artemov; Soviet Union
2nd place, silver medalist(s)		Valeri Liukin; Soviet Union
3rd place, bronze medalist(s)		Sven Tippelt; East Germany

The men's parallel bars competition was one of eight events for male competitors in artistic gymnastics at the 1988 Summer Olympics in Seoul. The qualification and final rounds took place on September 18, 20 and 24th at the Olympic Gymnastics Hall. There were 89 competitors from 23 nations, with nations competing in the team event having 6 gymnasts and other nations having up to 3 gymnasts. The event was won by Vladimir Artemov of the Soviet Union, bracketing the 1984 boycott with gold medal wins for the Soviets; Valeri Liukin took silver, as well. Sven Tippelt of East Germany took bronze.

== Background ==
This was the 17th appearance of the event, which is one of the five apparatus events held every time there were apparatus events at the Summer Olympics (no apparatus events were held in 1900, 1908, 1912, or 1920). Two of the eight finalists from 1984 returned: sixth-place finisher Li Ning of China and seventh-place finisher Daniel Winkler of West Germany. Vladimir Artemov of the Soviet Union was the reigning (1987) world champion, with his teammate Dmitry Bilozerchev runner-up and a pair of East Germans (Sven Tippelt and Sylvio Kroll) third and fourth.

Chinese Taipei made its debut in the men's parallel bars. The United States made its 15th appearance, most of any nation; the Americans had missed only the inaugural 1896 event and the boycotted 1980 Games.

== Competition format ==
Each nation entered a team of six gymnasts or up to three individual gymnasts. All entrants in the gymnastics competitions performed both a compulsory exercise and a voluntary exercise for each apparatus. The scores for all 12 exercises were summed to give an individual all-around score. These exercise scores were also used for qualification for the apparatus finals. The two exercises (compulsory and voluntary) for each apparatus were summed to give an apparatus score. Half of the preliminary score carried over to the final. The 1984 Games had expanded the number of finalists from six to eight. Nations were still limited to two finalists each. Others were ranked 9th through 89th.

== Schedule ==
All times are Korea Standard Time adjusted for daylight savings (UTC+10)

Date	Time	Round
Sunday, 18 September 1988		Preliminary: Compulsory
Tuesday, 20 September 1988		Preliminary: Voluntary
Saturday, 24 September 1988	14:20	Final

== Results ==
Eighty-nine gymnasts competed in the parallel bars event during the compulsory and optional rounds on September 18 and 20. The eight highest scoring gymnasts advanced to the final on September 24. Each country was limited to two competitors in the final. Half of the points earned by each gymnast during both the compulsory and optional rounds carried over to the final. This constitutes the "prelim" score.

Rank	Gymnast	Nation	Preliminary			Final		
Rank	Gymnast	Nation	Compulsory	Voluntary	Total	1/2 Prelim.	Final	Total
1st place, gold medalist(s)	Vladimir Artemov	Soviet Union	10.00	9.95	19.95	9.975	9.950	19.925
2nd place, silver medalist(s)	Valeri Liukin	Soviet Union	9.90	10.00	19.90	9.950	9.950	19.900
3rd place, bronze medalist(s)	Sven Tippelt	East Germany	9.90	9.80	19.70	9.850	9.900	19.750
4	Kalofer Khristozov	Bulgaria	9.80	9.95	19.75	9.875	9.850	19.725
5	Marius Gherman	Romania	9.80	9.90	19.70	9.850	9.850	19.700
6	Curtis Hibbert	Canada	9.80	9.90	19.70	9.850	9.825	19.675
7	Sylvio Kroll	East Germany	9.85	9.90	19.75	9.875	9.750	19.625
8	Boris Preti	Italy	9.80	9.90	19.70	9.850	9.750	19.600
9	Dmitry Bilozerchev	Soviet Union	9.90	10.00	19.90	Did not advance		
10	Holger Behrendt	East Germany	9.80	9.90	19.70	Did not advance		
10	Sergey Kharkov	Soviet Union	9.80	9.90	19.70	Did not advance		
10	Vladimir Novikov	Soviet Union	9.80	9.90	19.70	Did not advance		
13	Gyorgy Guczoghy	Hungary	9.75	9.90	19.65	Did not advance		
13	Stoyko Gochev	Bulgaria	9.80	9.85	19.65	Did not advance		
13	Ulf Hoffmann	East Germany	9.80	9.85	19.65	Did not advance		
13	Vladimir Gogoladze	Soviet Union	9.75	9.90	19.65	Did not advance		
13	Zsolt Borkai	Hungary	9.80	9.85	19.65	Did not advance		
18	Christian Chevalier	France	9.80	9.80	19.60	Did not advance		
18	Claude Carmona	France	9.80	9.80	19.60	Did not advance		
18	Jury Chechi	Italy	9.75	9.85	19.60	Did not advance		
18	Koichi Mizushima	Japan	9.70	9.90	19.60	Did not advance		
18	Guo Linxian	China	9.70	9.90	19.60	Did not advance		
18	Ralf Büchner	East Germany	9.80	9.80	19.60	Did not advance		
18	Toshiharu Sato	Japan	9.80	9.80	19.60	Did not advance		
25	Charles Lakes	United States	9.60	9.95	19.55	Did not advance		
25	Paolo Bucci	Italy	9.70	9.85	19.55	Did not advance		
25	Philippe Chartrand	Canada	9.75	9.80	19.55	Did not advance		
25	Xu Zhiqiang	China	9.70	9.85	19.55	Did not advance		
29	Adrian Sandu	Romania	9.80	9.70	19.50	Did not advance		
29	Daisuke Nishikawa	Japan	9.75	9.75	19.50	Did not advance		
29	Petar Georgiev	Bulgaria	9.70	9.80	19.50	Did not advance		
29	Scott Johnson	United States	9.70	9.80	19.50	Did not advance		
29	Takahiro Yamada	Japan	9.75	9.75	19.50	Did not advance		
29	Yukio Iketani	Japan	9.70	9.80	19.50	Did not advance		
35	Andreas Aguilar	West Germany	9.65	9.80	19.45	Did not advance		
35	Li Chunyang	China	9.70	9.75	19.45	Did not advance		
35	Josef Zellweger	Switzerland	9.65	9.80	19.45	Did not advance		
35	Nicolae Bejenaru	Romania	9.60	9.85	19.45	Did not advance		
39	Brad Peters	Canada	9.70	9.70	19.40	Did not advance		
39	Csaba Fajkusz	Hungary	9.60	9.80	19.40	Did not advance		
39	Gabriele Sala	Italy	9.70	9.70	19.40	Did not advance		
39	Park Jong-Hoon	South Korea	9.70	9.70	19.40	Did not advance		
39	Lubomir Geraskov	Bulgaria	9.60	9.80	19.40	Did not advance		
44	Alfonso Rodríguez	Spain	9.65	9.70	19.35	Did not advance		
44	Deyan Kolev	Bulgaria	9.60	9.75	19.35	Did not advance		
44	Kevin Davis	United States	9.50	9.85	19.35	Did not advance		
44	Marius Toba	Romania	9.55	9.80	19.35	Did not advance		
44	Patrick Mattioni	France	9.70	9.65	19.35	Did not advance		
44	Zsolt Horváth	Hungary	9.55	9.80	19.35	Did not advance		
50	Wang Chongsheng	China	9.65	9.65	19.30	Did not advance		
50	Daniel Winkler	West Germany	9.60	9.70	19.30	Did not advance		
50	Hiroyuki Konishi	Japan	9.60	9.70	19.30	Did not advance		
50	Lance Ringnald	United States	9.50	9.80	19.30	Did not advance		
50	Lorne Bobkin	Canada	9.60	9.70	19.30	Did not advance		
50	Mike Beckmann	West Germany	9.60	9.70	19.30	Did not advance		
50	Ralph Kern	West Germany	9.70	9.60	19.30	Did not advance		
50	Tony Piñeda	Mexico	9.65	9.65	19.30	Did not advance		
50	Ju Yeong-sam	South Korea	9.60	9.70	19.30	Did not advance		
59	Andreas Wecker	East Germany	9.70	9.55	19.25	Did not advance		
59	Bernhard Simmelbauer	West Germany	9.50	9.75	19.25	Did not advance		
59	Dimitar Taskov	Bulgaria	9.30	9.95	19.25	Did not advance		
59	Dominick Minicucci	United States	9.60	9.65	19.25	Did not advance		
59	Riccardo Trapella	Italy	9.50	9.75	19.25	Did not advance		
59	Valentin Pîntea	Romania	9.65	9.60	19.25	Did not advance		
59	Lou Yun	China	9.40	9.85	19.25	Did not advance		
66	Wes Suter	United States	9.40	9.80	19.20	Did not advance		
67	James Rozon	Canada	9.60	9.55	19.15	Did not advance		
67	Miguel Ángel Rubio	Spain	9.55	9.60	19.15	Did not advance		
69	Frédéric Longuepée	France	9.50	9.60	19.10	Did not advance		
69	Stéphane Cauterman	France	9.70	9.40	19.10	Did not advance		
69	Song Yu-jin	South Korea	9.45	9.65	19.10	Did not advance		
72	Andrew Morris	Great Britain	9.45	9.60	19.05	Did not advance		
72	Jürgen Brümmer	West Germany	9.45	9.60	19.05	Did not advance		
72	Terry Bartlett	Great Britain	9.50	9.55	19.05	Did not advance		
75	Vittorio Allievi	Italy	9.35	9.55	18.90	Did not advance		
76	Jenő Paprika	Hungary	9.15	9.70	18.85	Did not advance		
77	Bruno Cavelti	Switzerland	9.40	9.40	18.80	Did not advance		
77	Johan Jonasson	Sweden	9.40	9.40	18.80	Did not advance		
77	Marian Rizan	Romania	8.90	9.90	18.80	Did not advance		
80	Kenneth Meredith	Australia	9.15	9.60	18.75	Did not advance		
80	Thierry Pecqueux	France	9.65	9.10	18.75	Did not advance		
82	Alan Nolet	Canada	9.50	9.20	18.70	Did not advance		
82	Álvaro Montesinos	Spain	9.30	9.40	18.70	Did not advance		
84	Chang Chao-chun	Chinese Taipei	9.05	9.55	18.60	Did not advance		
84	Hélder Pinheiro	Portugal	9.20	9.40	18.60	Did not advance		
84	Li Ning	China	9.00	9.60	18.60	Did not advance		
87	Jože Kolman	Yugoslavia	9.05	9.50	18.55	Did not advance		
88	Gil Pinto	Brazil	8.30	9.50	17.80	Did not advance		
89	Balázs Tóth	Hungary	9.70	—	9.70	Did not advance		
