= Gymnastics at the 1988 Summer Olympics – Men's artistic individual all-around =

Olympic gymnastics event

Men's artistic individual all-around at the Games of the XXIV Olympiad
- Olympic Gymnastics Hall (2012)
- Venue: Olympic Gymnastics Hall
- Dates: 18–22 September 1988
- Competitors: 89 from 23 nations
- Winning score: 119.125

Medalists
1st place, gold medalist(s)		Vladimir Artemov; Soviet Union
2nd place, silver medalist(s)		Valeri Liukin; Soviet Union
3rd place, bronze medalist(s)		Dmitri Bilozertchev; Soviet Union

The men's individual all-around competition was one of eight events for male competitors in artistic gymnastics at the 1988 Summer Olympics in Seoul. The qualification and final rounds took place on September 18, 20, and 22nd at the Olympic Gymnastics Hall. There were 89 competitors from 23 nations. Each nation could send a team of 6 gymnasts or up to 3 individual gymnasts. The event was won by Vladimir Artemov of the Soviet Union, the nation's sixth victory in the event (then the most of any nation; Japan tied this total in 2016). The Soviets swept the medals, with Valeri Liukin taking silver and Dmitri Bilozertchev bronze. It was the third medal sweep in the men's all-around; France had done it in 1900 and Japan in 1972.

== Background ==
This was the 20th appearance of the men's individual all-around. The first individual all-around competition had been held in 1900, after the 1896 competitions featured only individual apparatus events. A men's individual all-around has been held every Games since 1900.

Two of the top 10 gymnasts from the 1984 Games returned, both from China: bronze medalist Li Ning and seventh-place finisher Xu Zhiqiang. The reigning (1987) World Champion was Dmitry Bilozerchev of the Soviet Union; his teammate Yuri Korolyov had won in 1985 and placed second behind Bilozerchev in 1987 but missed the Games due to an Achilles injury. Vladimir Artemov, also of the Soviet Union, had finished just behind Korolyov both years (second at the World Championships in 1985 and third in 1987), and was competing in the 1988 Olympics. The only non-Soviet to earn a medal in the men's all-around at either World Championship was East German Sylvio Kroll (third in 1985).

Chinese Taipei made its debut in the event. France made its 18th appearance, most among nations.

== Competition format ==
The competition format followed the preliminary and final format introduced in 1972, with the limit on the number of finalists per nation added in 1976. All entrants in the gymnastics competitions performed both a compulsory exercise and a voluntary exercise for each apparatus. The scores for all 12 exercises were summed to give an individual all-around preliminary score. Half of the scores from the preliminary carried over to the final, with the top 36 gymnasts advancing to the individual all-around final—except that each nation was limited to 3 finalists. There, each of the finalists performed another exercise on each apparatus. The sum of these scores plus half of the preliminary score resulted in a final total.

Each exercise was scored from 0 to 10; thus, the preliminary apparatus scores ranged from 0 to 20 each and the total preliminary score from 0 to 120. With half of the preliminary score and six more exercises scored 0 to 10, the final total was also from 0 to 120.

The preliminary exercise scores were also used for qualification for the apparatus finals.

== Schedule ==
All times are Korea Standard Time adjusted for daylight savings (UTC+10)

Date	Time	Round
Sunday, 18 September 1988	11:00	Preliminary: Compulsory
Tuesday, 20 September 1988	11:00	Preliminary: Voluntary
Thursday, 22 September 1988	12:00	Final

== Results ==
Eighty-nine gymnasts competed in the all-around during the compulsory and optional rounds on September 18 and 20. The thirty-six highest scoring gymnasts advanced to the final on September 22. Each country was limited to three competitors in the final. Half of the points earned by each gymnast during both the compulsory and optional rounds carried over to the final. This constitutes each gymnast's "prelim" score.

Rank	Gymnast	Nation	Prelim	1/2 Prelim	Floor	Pommel horse	Rings	Vault	Parallel bars	Horizontal bar	Final	Total
1st place, gold medalist(s)	Vladimir Artemov	Soviet Union	118.95	59.475	9.900	9.900	9.900	9.950	10.000	10.000	59.650	119.125
2nd place, silver medalist(s)	Valeri Liukin	Soviet Union	118.85	59.425	9.900	9.950	9.950	9.900	9.900	10.000	59.600	119.025
3rd place, bronze medalist(s)	Dmitri Bilozertchev	Soviet Union	118.45	59.225	9.900	10.000	10.000	10.000	9.950	9.900	59.750	118.975
4	Sven Tippelt	East Germany	117.60	58.800	9.800	9.950	9.950	9.900	9.800	9.800	59.200	118.000
5	Marius Gherman	Romania	117.55	58.775	9.800	9.900	9.850	9.800	9.800	9.900	59.050	117.825
6	Kalofer Khristozov	Bulgaria	117.70	58.850	9.800	9.900	9.900	9.650	9.850	9.800	58.900	117.750
6	Wang Chongsheng	China	117.20	58.600	9.750	9.900	9.850	9.900	9.850	9.900	59.150	117.750
8	Gyorgy Guczoghy	Hungary	117.25	58.625	9.750	10.000	9.900	9.800	9.800	9.800	59.050	117.675
8	Yukio Iketani	Japan	117.65	58.825	9.950	9.800	9.750	9.650	9.900	9.800	58.850	117.675
10	Sylvio Kroll	East Germany	117.85	58.925	9.900	10.000	9.850	9.650	9.900	9.400	58.700	117.625
10	Koichi Mizushima	Japan	117.45	58.725	9.800	9.800	9.900	9.650	9.850	9.900	58.900	117.625
12	Lou Yun	China	117.10	58.550	9.900	9.900	9.900	9.700	9.900	9.750	59.050	117.600
13	Daisuke Nishikawa	Japan	117.25	58.625	9.850	9.900	9.800	9.450	9.900	9.900	58.800	117.425
14	Csaba Fajkusz	Hungary	116.75	58.375	9.750	9.900	9.800	9.750	9.750	10.000	58.950	117.325
15	Xu Zhiqiang	China	117.00	58.500	9.900	9.850	9.900	9.800	9.900	9.450	58.800	117.300
15	Boris Preti	Italy	116.90	58.450	9.850	9.900	9.900	9.800	9.750	9.650	58.850	117.300
17	Jury Chechi	Italy	116.55	58.275	9.800	9.900	9.950	9.800	9.800	9.750	59.000	117.275
18	Ralf Büchner	East Germany	117.20	58.600	9.750	9.800	9.800	9.650	9.750	9.850	58.600	117.200
19	Charles Lakes	United States	116.45	58.225	9.900	9.750	9.800	9.850	9.700	9.950	58.950	117.175
20	Dimitar Taskov	Bulgaria	116.75	58.375	9.550	9.800	9.750	9.850	9.900	9.900	58.750	117.125
21	Marius Toba	Romania	116.75	58.375	9.800	9.850	9.900	9.700	9.500	9.800	58.550	116.925
22	Curtis Hibbert	Canada	116.75	58.375	9.800	9.600	9.700	9.600	9.850	9.900	58.45	116.825
23	Lyubomir Gueraskov	Bulgaria	116.75	58.375	9.550	9.900	9.800	9.500	9.700	9.800	58.250	116.625
24	Paolo Bucci	Italy	115.70	57.860	9.750	9.900	9.850	9.800	9.750	9.700	58.750	116.600
25	Park Jong-Hoon	South Korea	115.60	57.800	9.750	9.600	9.800	9.850	9.850	9.850	58.700	116.500
26	Brad Peters	Canada	116.05	58.025	9.800	9.900	9.750	9.500	9.800	9.700	58.450	116.475
27	Alfonso Rodríguez	Spain	115.45	57.725	9.800	9.900	9.800	9.600	9.700	9.900	58.700	116.425
28	Zsolt Horváth	Hungary	115.50	57.750	9.800	9.950	9.600	9.900	9.700	9.700	58.650	116.400
29	Christian Chevalier	France	116.15	58.075	9.700	9.600	9.500	9.600	9.700	9.800	57.900	115.975
30	Johan Jonasson	Sweden	114.60	57.300	9.700	9.850	9.850	9.800	9.650	9.800	58.650	115.950
31	Patrick Mattioni	France	116.00	58.000	9.650	9.800	9.750	9.550	9.750	8.950	57.450	115.450
31	Josef Zellweger	Switzerland	114.60	57.300	9.650	9.800	9.800	9.500	9.800	9.600	58.150	115.450
33	Nicolae Bejenaru	Romania	115.30	57.650	9.700	9.800	9.750	9.600	9.900	9.000	57.750	115.400
34	Kevin Davis	United States	114.75	57.375	9.650	9.800	9.650	9.500	9.650	9.700	57.950	115.325
35	Lance Ringnald	United States	115.25	57.625	9.500	9.800	9.650	9.550	9.850	9.100	57.450	115.075
36	Claude Carmona	France	115.05	57.525	9.600	9.800	9.650	9.600	9.800	8.950	57.400	114.925
37	Sergey Kharkov	Soviet Union	118.40	Did not advance—3 per nation rule								
38	Lado Gogoladze	Soviet Union	117.70	Did not advance—3 per nation rule								
39	Vladimir Novikov	Soviet Union	117.50	Did not advance—3 per nation rule								
40	Holger Behrendt	East Germany	116.95	Did not advance—3 per nation rule								
41	Toshiharu Sato	Japan	116.65	Did not advance—3 per nation rule								
42	Ulf Hoffmann	East Germany	116.40	Did not advance—3 per nation rule								
43	Deyan Kolev	Bulgaria	116.30	Did not advance—3 per nation rule								
43	Andreas Wecker	East Germany	116.30	Did not advance—3 per nation rule								
45	Li Chunyang	China	116.15	Did not advance—3 per nation rule								
46	Stoyko Gochev	Bulgaria	115.95	Did not advance—3 per nation rule								
47	Hiroyuki Konishi	Japan	115.80	Did not advance—3 per nation rule								
48	Petar Georgiev	Bulgaria	115.60	Did not advance—3 per nation rule								
49	Zsolt Borkai	Hungary	115.40	Did not advance—3 per nation rule								
49	Takahiro Yamada	Japan	115.40	Did not advance—3 per nation rule								
51	Guo Linxian	China	115.35	Did not advance—3 per nation rule								
52	Adrian Sandu	Romania	115.15	Did not advance—3 per nation rule								
53	Li Ning	China	114.95	Did not advance—3 per nation rule								
54	Thierry Pecqueux	France	114.85	Did not advance—3 per nation rule								
54	Marian Rizan	Romania	114.85	Did not advance—3 per nation rule								
56	Riccardo Trapella	Italy	114.75	Did not advance—3 per nation rule								
57	Jenő Paprika	Hungary	114.70	Did not advance—3 per nation rule								
58	Lorne Bobkin	Canada	114.60	Did not advance—3 per nation rule								
59	Daniel Winkler	West Germany	114.50	Did not advance								
60	Mike Beckmann	West Germany	114.45	Did not advance								
61	Ju Yeong-sam	South Korea	114.25	Did not advance								
61	Gabriele Sala	Italy	114.25	Did not advance								
63	Scott Johnson	United States	114.20	Did not advance								
64	Jürgen Brümmer	West Germany	114.15	Did not advance								
65	James Rozon	Canada	114.10	Did not advance								
65	Alan Nolet	Canada	114.10	Did not advance								
67	Ralph Kern	West Germany	113.90	Did not advance								
67	Dominick Minicucci	United States	113.90	Did not advance								
69	Wes Suter	United States	113.85	Did not advance								
70	Stéphane Cauterman	France	113.75	Did not advance								
71	Song Yu-jin	South Korea	113.60	Did not advance								
71	Bernhard Simmelbauer	West Germany	113.60	Did not advance								
73	Andreas Aguilar	West Germany	113.35	Did not advance								
74	Bruno Cavelti	Switzerland	113.10	Did not advance								
75	Terry Bartlett	Great Britain	112.95	Did not advance								
76	Frédéric Longuepée	France	112.90	Did not advance								
77	Miguel Ángel Rubio	Spain	112.85	Did not advance								
78	Álvaro Montesinos	Spain	112.65	Did not advance								
78	Vittorio Allievi	Italy	112.65	Did not advance								
80	Kenneth Meredith	Australia	112.10	Did not advance								
81	Andrew Morris	Great Britain	112.05	Did not advance								
82	Jože Kolman	Yugoslavia	110.45	Did not advance								
83	Chang Chao-chun	Chinese Taipei	110.30	Did not advance								
84	Gil Pinto	Brazil	109.90	Did not advance								
85	Hélder Pinheiro	Portugal	109.60	Did not advance								
86	Philippe Chartrand	Canada	105.80	Did not advance								
87	Valentin Pîntea	Romania	105.55	Did not advance								
88	Tony Piñeda	Mexico	102.40	Did not advance								
89	Balázs Tóth	Hungary	77.05	Did not advance								
