= Gymnastics at the 1988 Summer Olympics – Men's rings =

Olympic gymnastics event

Men's rings at the Games of the XXIV Olympiad
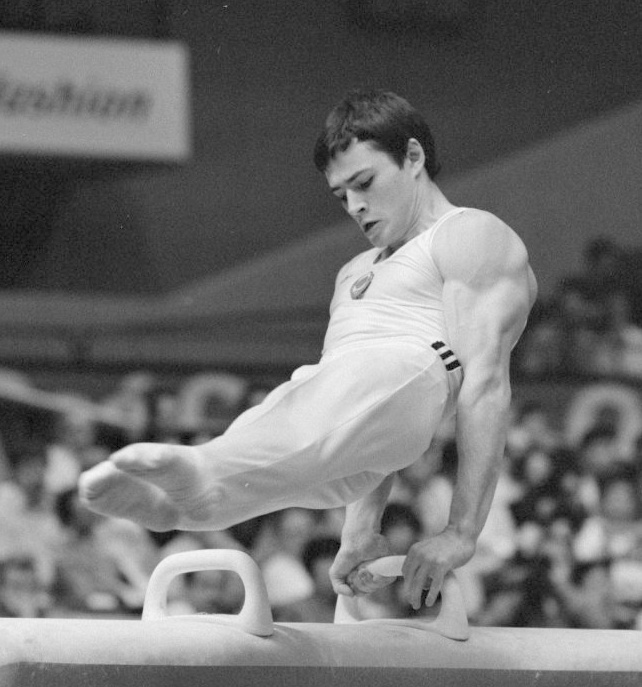
- Dmitry Bilozerchev (1987, on pommel horse)
- Venue: Olympic Gymnastics Hall
- Dates: 18–24 September 1988
- Competitors: 89 from 23 nations

Medalists
1st place, gold medalist(s)		Holger Behrendt	East Germany
1st place, gold medalist(s)		Dmitry Bilozerchev	Soviet Union
3rd place, bronze medalist(s)		Sven Tippelt	East Germany

The men's rings competition was one of eight events for male competitors in artistic gymnastics at the 1988 Summer Olympics in Seoul. The qualification and final rounds took place on September 18, 20, and 24th at the Olympic Gymnastics Hall. There were 89 competitors from 23 nations, with nations competing in the team event having 6 gymnasts and other nations having up to 3 gymnasts. For the second consecutive Games, the event ended in a way tie for first place. Dmitry Bilozerchev of the Soviet Union and Holger Behrendt of East Germany each received a gold medal. It was East Germany's first medal in the rings. The Soviets had had an eight-Games medal streak (and two-Games gold medal streak) in the event snapped by their boycott of the 1984 Games; Bilozerchev's medal put the nation back on the podium after that one-Games absence. Sven Tippelt, also of East Germany, took bronze.

== Background ==
This was the 17th appearance of the event, which is one of the five apparatus events held every time there were apparatus events at the Summer Olympics (no apparatus events were held in 1900, 1908, 1912, or 1920). Two of the eight finalists from 1984 returned: gold medalist Li Ning of China and eighth-place finisher Josef Zellweger of Switzerland. Two-time world champion Yuri Korolyov of the Soviet Union was injured and unable to compete in Seoul. Li had shared gold with Korolyov at the 1985 World Championships and silver with Dmitry Bilozerchev of the Soviet Union at the 1987 World Championships.

Chinese Taipei made its debut in the men's rings. The United States made its 15th appearance, most of any nation; the Americans had missed only the inaugural 1896 rings and the boycotted 1980 Games.

== Competition format ==
Each nation entered a team of six gymnasts or up to three individual gymnasts. All entrants in the gymnastics competitions performed both a compulsory exercise and a voluntary exercise for each apparatus. The scores for all 12 exercises were summed to give an individual all-around score. These exercise scores were also used for qualification for the apparatus finals. The two exercises (compulsory and voluntary) for each apparatus were summed to give an apparatus score. Half of the preliminary score carried over to the final. The 1984 Games had expanded the number of finalists from six to eight. Nations were still limited to two finalists each. Others were ranked 9th through 89th.

== Schedule ==
All times are Korea Standard Time adjusted for daylight savings (UTC+10)

Date	Time	Round
Sunday, 18 September 1988		Preliminary: Compulsory
Tuesday, 20 September 1988		Preliminary: Voluntary
Saturday, 24 September 1988	13:10	Final

== Results ==
Eighty-nine gymnasts competed in the rings event during the compulsory and optional rounds on September 18 and 20. The eight highest scoring gymnasts advanced to the final on September 24. Each country was limited to two competitors in the final. Half of the points earned by each gymnast during both the compulsory and optional rounds carried over to the final. This constitutes each gymnast's "prelim" score.

Rank	Gymnast	Nation	Preliminary			Final		
Rank	Gymnast	Nation	Compulsory	Voluntary	Total	1/2 Prelim.	Final	Total
1st place, gold medalist(s)	Holger Behrendt	East Germany	9.90	10.00	19.90	9.950	9.975	19.925
1st place, gold medalist(s)	Dmitry Bilozerchev	Soviet Union	9.95	10.00	19.95	9.975	9.950	19.925
3rd place, bronze medalist(s)	Sven Tippelt	East Germany	9.90	9.95	19.85	9.925	9.950	19.875
4	Kalofer Khristozov	Bulgaria	9.90	9.90	19.80	9.900	9.925	19.825
4	Valeri Liukin	Soviet Union	9.90	9.95	19.85	9.925	9.900	19.825
6	Lou Yun	China	9.80	9.90	19.70	9.850	9.950	19.800
6	Jury Chechi	Italy	9.80	9.90	19.70	9.850	9.950	19.800
8	Gyorgy Guczoghy	Hungary	9.85	9.90	19.75	9.875	9.825	19.700
9	Vladimir Artemov	Soviet Union	9.90	9.90	19.80	Did not advance		
9	Sergey Kharkov	Soviet Union	9.90	9.90	19.80	Did not advance		
11	Andreas Aguilar	West Germany	9.80	9.90	19.70	Did not advance		
11	Lubomir Geraskov	Bulgaria	9.80	9.90	19.70	Did not advance		
11	Sylvio Kroll	East Germany	9.80	9.90	19.70	Did not advance		
11	Vladimir Novikov	Soviet Union	9.80	9.90	19.70	Did not advance		
11	Xu Zhiqiang	China	9.80	9.90	19.70	Did not advance		
16	Deyan Kolev	Bulgaria	9.80	9.85	19.65	Did not advance		
16	Marius Toba	Romania	9.85	9.80	19.65	Did not advance		
18	Vladimir Gogoladze	Soviet Union	9.80	9.80	19.60	Did not advance		
18	Boris Preti	Italy	9.70	9.90	19.60	Did not advance		
18	Andreas Wecker	East Germany	9.80	9.80	19.60	Did not advance		
21	Csaba Fajkusz	Hungary	9.70	9.85	19.55	Did not advance		
21	Stoyko Gochev	Bulgaria	9.70	9.85	19.55	Did not advance		
21	Yukio Iketani	Japan	9.80	9.75	19.55	Did not advance		
21	Toshiharu Sato	Japan	9.75	9.80	19.55	Did not advance		
21	Wang Chongsheng	China	9.75	9.80	19.55	Did not advance		
26	Guo Linxian	China	9.70	9.80	19.50	Did not advance		
26	Li Chunyang	China	9.70	9.80	19.50	Did not advance		
26	Valentin Pîntea	Romania	9.75	9.75	19.50	Did not advance		
29	Koichi Mizushima	Japan	9.65	9.80	19.45	Did not advance		
29	Daisuke Nishikawa	Japan	9.75	9.70	19.45	Did not advance		
29	Alfonso Rodríguez	Spain	9.70	9.75	19.45	Did not advance		
29	Dimitar Taskov	Bulgaria	9.65	9.80	19.45	Did not advance		
29	Josef Zellweger	Switzerland	9.70	9.75	19.45	Did not advance		
34	Jürgen Brümmer	West Germany	9.70	9.70	19.40	Did not advance		
34	Ralf Büchner	East Germany	9.70	9.70	19.40	Did not advance		
34	Curtis Hibbert	Canada	9.70	9.70	19.40	Did not advance		
34	Zsolt Horváth	Hungary	9.60	9.80	19.40	Did not advance		
34	Song Yu-jin	South Korea	9.65	9.75	19.40	Did not advance		
39	Paolo Bucci	Italy	9.55	9.80	19.35	Did not advance		
39	Philippe Chartrand	Canada	9.70	9.65	19.35	Did not advance		
39	Petar Georgiev	Bulgaria	9.65	9.70	19.35	Did not advance		
39	Marius Gherman	Romania	9.65	9.70	19.35	Did not advance		
39	Ulf Hoffmann	East Germany	9.65	9.70	19.35	Did not advance		
39	Li Ning	China	9.40	9.95	19.35	Did not advance		
39	Takahiro Yamada	Japan	9.70	9.65	19.35	Did not advance		
46	Claude Carmona	France	9.70	9.60	19.30	Did not advance		
46	Hiroyuki Konishi	Japan	9.70	9.60	19.30	Did not advance		
48	Zsolt Borkai	Hungary	9.80	9.45	19.25	Did not advance		
48	Christian Chevalier	France	9.45	9.80	19.25	Did not advance		
48	Brad Peters	Canada	9.70	9.55	19.25	Did not advance		
48	Miguel Ángel Rubio	Spain	9.60	9.65	19.25	Did not advance		
52	Charles Lakes	United States	9.60	9.60	19.20	Did not advance		
52	Patrick Mattioni	France	9.55	9.65	19.20	Did not advance		
52	Park Jong-Hoon	South Korea	9.65	9.55	19.20	Did not advance		
52	Marian Rizan	Romania	9.55	9.65	19.20	Did not advance		
56	Jenő Paprika	Hungary	9.50	9.65	19.15	Did not advance		
56	Thierry Pecqueux	France	9.40	9.75	19.15	Did not advance		
58	Nicolae Bejenaru	Romania	9.55	9.55	19.10	Did not advance		
58	Kevin Davis	United States	9.50	9.60	19.10	Did not advance		
58	Scott Johnson	United States	9.30	9.80	19.10	Did not advance		
58	Riccardo Trapella	Italy	9.40	9.70	19.10	Did not advance		
62	Johan Jonasson	Sweden	9.40	9.65	19.05	Did not advance		
62	Ju Yeong-sam	South Korea	9.75	9.30	19.05	Did not advance		
62	Dominick Minicucci	United States	9.55	9.50	19.05	Did not advance		
65	Andrew Morris	Great Britain	9.50	9.50	19.00	Did not advance		
65	Adrian Sandu	Romania	9.55	9.45	19.00	Did not advance		
67	Bruno Cavelti	Switzerland	9.35	9.60	18.95	Did not advance		
67	Alan Nolet	Canada	9.55	9.40	18.95	Did not advance		
67	Bernhard Simmelbauer	West Germany	9.45	9.50	18.95	Did not advance		
70	Daniel Winkler	West Germany	9.50	9.40	18.90	Did not advance		
71	Álvaro Montesinos	Spain	9.55	9.30	18.85	Did not advance		
71	Lance Ringnald	United States	9.30	9.55	18.85	Did not advance		
73	Kenneth Meredith	Australia	9.30	9.50	18.80	Did not advance		
73	James Rozon	Canada	9.50	9.30	18.80	Did not advance		
75	Frédéric Longuepée	France	9.15	9.55	18.70	Did not advance		
76	Terry Bartlett	Great Britain	9.50	9.15	18.65	Did not advance		
76	Stéphane Cauterman	France	9.25	9.40	18.65	Did not advance		
76	Gabriele Sala	Italy	9.45	9.20	18.65	Did not advance		
79	Mike Beckmann	West Germany	9.40	9.20	18.60	Did not advance		
79	Lorne Bobkin	Canada	9.45	9.15	18.60	Did not advance		
81	Vittorio Allievi	Italy	9.15	9.40	18.55	Did not advance		
82	Wes Suter	United States	9.15	9.35	18.50	Did not advance		
83	Ralph Kern	West Germany	9.60	8.80	18.40	Did not advance		
83	Jože Kolman	Yugoslavia	9.10	9.30	18.40	Did not advance		
85	Chang Chao-chun	Chinese Taipei	9.20	8.95	18.15	Did not advance		
86	Gil Pinto	Brazil	8.80	9.30	18.10	Did not advance		
87	Tony Piñeda	Mexico	8.60	9.40	18.00	Did not advance		
88	Hélder Pinheiro	Portugal	8.70	9.25	17.95	Did not advance		
89	Balázs Tóth	Hungary	9.65	0.00	9.65	Did not advance		
