= Gymnastics at the 1988 Summer Olympics – Men's horizontal bar =

Men's horizontal bar at the Games of the XXIV Olympiad
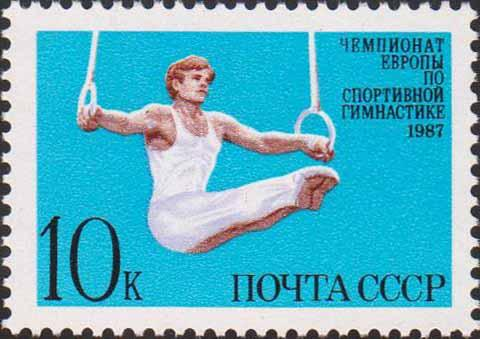
- Valeri Liukin, on 1987 Soviet stamp (rings)
- Venue: Olympic Gymnastics Hall
- Dates: 18–24 September 1988
- Competitors: 89 from 23 nations
- Winning score: 19.900

Medalists
| 1st place, gold medalist(s) | | Vladimir Artemov; Soviet Union |
| 1st place, gold medalist(s) | | Valeri Liukin; Soviet Union |
| 3rd place, bronze medalist(s) | | Holger Behrendt; East Germany |
| 3rd place, bronze medalist(s) | | Marius Gherman; Romania |

The men's horizontal bar competition was one of eight events for male competitors in artistic gymnastics at the 1988 Summer Olympics in Seoul. The qualification and final rounds took place on September 18, 20 and 24th at the Olympic Gymnastics Hall. There were 89 competitors from 23 nations, with nations competing in the team event having 6 gymnasts and other nations having up to 3 gymnasts. There were ties for both gold and bronze medals. The Soviet Union took two golds, as Vladimir Artemov and Valeri Liukin finished even at the top spot; they were the Soviets' first gold medals in the horizontal bar since 1968, and moved the Soviet Union past the United States and Switzerland into second most all-time golds in the event (after Japan with six). Bronze medals went to Holger Behrendt of East Germany and Marius Gherman of Romania, the first medal in the event for both nations. It was the first time since 1964 that Japanese gymnasts competed but did not win the event.

== Background ==
This was the 17th appearance of the event, which is one of the five apparatus events held every time there were apparatus events at the Summer Olympics (no apparatus events were held in 1900, 1908, 1912, or 1920). Only one of the eight finalists from 1984 returned: fourth-place finisher Lou Yun of China. Dmitry Bilozerchev of the Soviet Union was the reigning (1987) world champion, with the rest of the worlds podium consisting of Canadian Curtis Hibbert (silver), East German Holger Behrendt, and Hungarian Zsolt Borkai (the latter two tied for bronze).

Chinese Taipei made its debut in the men's horizontal bar. The United States made its 15th appearance, most of any nation; the Americans had missed only the inaugural 1896 event and the boycotted 1980 Games.

== Competition format ==
Each nation entered a team of six gymnasts or up to three individual gymnasts. All entrants in the gymnastics competitions performed both a compulsory exercise and a voluntary exercise for each apparatus. The scores for all 12 exercises were summed to give an individual all-around score. These exercise scores were also used for qualification for the apparatus finals. The two exercises (compulsory and voluntary) for each apparatus were summed to give an apparatus score. Half of the preliminary score carried over to the final. The 1984 Games had expanded the number of finalists from six to eight. Nations were still limited to two finalists each. Others were ranked 9th through 89th.

== Schedule ==
All times are Korea Standard Time adjusted for daylight savings (UTC+10)

| Date | Time | Round |
|---|---|---|
| Sunday, 18 September 1988 | | Preliminary: Compulsory |
| Tuesday, 20 September 1988 | | Preliminary: Voluntary |
| Saturday, 24 September 1988 | 14:50 | Final |

== Results ==
Eighty-nine gymnasts competed in the horizontal bar event during the compulsory and optional rounds on September 18 and 20. The eight highest scoring gymnasts advanced to the final on September 24. Each country was limited to two competitors in the final. Half of the points earned by each gymnast during both the compulsory and optional rounds carried over to the final. This constitutes the "prelim" score.

| Rank | Gymnast | Nation | Preliminary | | | Final | | |
| Rank | Gymnast | Nation | Compulsory | Voluntary | Total | 1/2 Prelim. | Final | Total |
|---|---|---|---|---|---|---|---|---|
| 1st place, gold medalist(s) | Vladimir Artemov | Soviet Union | 9.90 | 10.00 | 19.90 | 9.950 | 9.950 | 19.900 |
| 1st place, gold medalist(s) | Valeri Liukin | Soviet Union | 9.90 | 9.95 | 19.85 | 9.925 | 9.975 | 19.900 |
| 3rd place, bronze medalist(s) | Holger Behrendt | East Germany | 9.75 | 9.95 | 19.70 | 9.850 | 9.950 | 19.800 |
| 3rd place, bronze medalist(s) | Marius Gherman | Romania | 9.80 | 9.90 | 19.70 | 9.850 | 9.950 | 19.800 |
| 5 | Wang Chongsheng | China | 9.90 | 9.85 | 19.75 | 9.875 | 9.900 | 19.775 |
| 6 | Xu Zhiqiang | China | 9.90 | 9.80 | 19.70 | 9.850 | 9.850 | 19.700 |
| 7 | Curtis Hibbert | Canada | 9.80 | 9.90 | 19.70 | 9.850 | 9.825 | 19.675 |
| 8 | Andreas Wecker | East Germany | 9.80 | 9.90 | 19.70 | 9.850 | 9.650 | 19.500 |
| 9 | Csaba Fajkusz | Hungary | 9.75 | 9.90 | 19.65 | Did not advance | | |
| 9 | Yukio Iketani | Japan | 9.90 | 9.75 | 19.65 | Did not advance | | |
| 9 | Daisuke Nishikawa | Japan | 9.80 | 9.85 | 19.65 | Did not advance | | |
| 12 | Li Ning | China | 9.80 | 9.80 | 19.60 | Did not advance | | |
| 12 | Koichi Mizushima | Japan | 9.85 | 9.75 | 19.60 | Did not advance | | |
| 12 | Vladimir Novikov | Soviet Union | 9.70 | 9.90 | 19.60 | Did not advance | | |
| 15 | Philippe Chartrand | Canada | 9.75 | 9.80 | 19.55 | Did not advance | | |
| 15 | Stoyko Gochev | Bulgaria | 9.75 | 9.80 | 19.55 | Did not advance | | |
| 15 | Vladimir Gogoladze | Soviet Union | 9.65 | 9.90 | 19.55 | Did not advance | | |
| 15 | Sergey Kharkov | Soviet Union | 9.65 | 9.90 | 19.55 | Did not advance | | |
| 15 | Patrick Mattioni | France | 9.75 | 9.80 | 19.55 | Did not advance | | |
| 15 | Balázs Tóth | Hungary | 9.80 | 9.75 | 19.55 | Did not advance | | |
| 21 | Ralf Büchner | East Germany | 9.70 | 9.80 | 19.50 | Did not advance | | |
| 21 | Kalofer Khristozov | Bulgaria | 9.70 | 9.80 | 19.50 | Did not advance | | |
| 21 | Charles Lakes | United States | 9.80 | 9.70 | 19.50 | Did not advance | | |
| 24 | Zsolt Borkai | Hungary | 9.80 | 9.65 | 19.45 | Did not advance | | |
| 24 | Christian Chevalier | France | 9.65 | 9.80 | 19.45 | Did not advance | | |
| 24 | Dimitar Taskov | Bulgaria | 9.65 | 9.80 | 19.45 | Did not advance | | |
| 24 | Marius Toba | Romania | 9.65 | 9.80 | 19.45 | Did not advance | | |
| 24 | Brad Peters | Canada | 9.75 | 9.70 | 19.45 | Did not advance | | |
| 24 | Lance Ringnald | United States | 9.70 | 9.75 | 19.45 | Did not advance | | |
| 30 | Thierry Pecqueux | France | 9.70 | 9.70 | 19.40 | Did not advance | | |
| 31 | Dmitry Bilozerchev | Soviet Union | 9.90 | 9.45 | 19.35 | Did not advance | | |
| 31 | Li Chunyang | China | 9.65 | 9.70 | 19.35 | Did not advance | | |
| 31 | Lou Yun | China | 9.80 | 9.55 | 19.35 | Did not advance | | |
| 31 | Park Jong-Hoon | South Korea | 9.65 | 9.70 | 19.35 | Did not advance | | |
| 35 | Alfonso Rodríguez | Spain | 9.50 | 9.80 | 19.30 | Did not advance | | |
| 35 | Hiroyuki Konishi | Japan | 9.70 | 9.60 | 19.30 | Did not advance | | |
| 35 | Adrian Sandu | Romania | 9.60 | 9.70 | 19.30 | Did not advance | | |
| 38 | Gyorgy Guczoghy | Hungary | 9.55 | 9.70 | 19.25 | Did not advance | | |
| 38 | Ulf Hoffmann | East Germany | 9.55 | 9.70 | 19.25 | Did not advance | | |
| 38 | Zsolt Horváth | Hungary | 9.60 | 9.65 | 19.25 | Did not advance | | |
| 38 | Johan Jonasson | Sweden | 9.55 | 9.70 | 19.25 | Did not advance | | |
| 38 | Ju Yeong-sam | South Korea | 9.60 | 9.65 | 19.25 | Did not advance | | |
| 38 | Alan Nolet | Canada | 9.60 | 9.65 | 19.25 | Did not advance | | |
| 38 | Marian Rizan | Romania | 9.50 | 9.75 | 19.25 | Did not advance | | |
| 38 | Daniel Winkler | West Germany | 9.60 | 9.65 | 19.25 | Did not advance | | |
| 38 | Takahiro Yamada | Japan | 9.60 | 9.65 | 19.25 | Did not advance | | |
| 47 | James Rozon | Canada | 9.65 | 9.55 | 19.20 | Did not advance | | |
| 47 | Sven Tippelt | East Germany | 9.80 | 9.40 | 19.20 | Did not advance | | |
| 47 | Deyan Kolev | Bulgaria | 9.60 | 9.60 | 19.20 | Did not advance | | |
| 50 | Bruno Cavelti | Switzerland | 9.60 | 9.55 | 19.15 | Did not advance | | |
| 50 | Sylvio Kroll | East Germany | 9.25 | 9.90 | 19.15 | Did not advance | | |
| 52 | Nicolae Bejenaru | Romania | 9.50 | 9.60 | 19.10 | Did not advance | | |
| 52 | Paolo Bucci | Italy | 9.65 | 9.45 | 19.10 | Did not advance | | |
| 52 | Lubomir Geraskov | Bulgaria | 9.70 | 9.40 | 19.10 | Did not advance | | |
| 52 | Jenő Paprika | Hungary | 9.60 | 9.50 | 19.10 | Did not advance | | |
| 56 | Boris Preti | Italy | 9.80 | 9.25 | 19.05 | Did not advance | | |
| 56 | Toshiharu Sato | Japan | 9.80 | 9.25 | 19.05 | Did not advance | | |
| 58 | Andreas Aguilar | West Germany | 9.40 | 9.60 | 19.00 | Did not advance | | |
| 58 | Terry Bartlett | Great Britain | 9.30 | 9.70 | 19.00 | Did not advance | | |
| 58 | Gabriele Sala | Italy | 9.60 | 9.40 | 19.00 | Did not advance | | |
| 58 | Song Yu-jin | South Korea | 9.50 | 9.50 | 19.00 | Did not advance | | |
| 58 | Wes Suter | United States | 9.35 | 9.65 | 19.00 | Did not advance | | |
| 63 | Petar Georgiev | Bulgaria | 9.50 | 9.45 | 18.95 | Did not advance | | |
| 63 | Dominick Minicucci | United States | 9.45 | 9.50 | 18.95 | Did not advance | | |
| 65 | Valentin Pîntea | Romania | 9.35 | 9.55 | 18.90 | Did not advance | | |
| 66 | Jury Chechi | Italy | 9.20 | 9.65 | 18.85 | Did not advance | | |
| 66 | Kevin Davis | United States | 9.60 | 9.25 | 18.85 | Did not advance | | |
| 68 | Lorne Bobkin | Canada | 9.75 | 9.05 | 18.80 | Did not advance | | |
| 68 | Riccardo Trapella | Italy | 9.50 | 9.30 | 18.80 | Did not advance | | |
| 70 | Guo Linxian | China | 9.65 | 9.10 | 18.75 | Did not advance | | |
| 70 | Ralph Kern | West Germany | 9.45 | 9.30 | 18.75 | Did not advance | | |
| 70 | Frédéric Longuepée | France | 9.25 | 9.50 | 18.75 | Did not advance | | |
| 70 | Gil Pinto | Brazil | 9.35 | 9.40 | 18.75 | Did not advance | | |
| 74 | Vittorio Allievi | Italy | 9.55 | 9.15 | 18.70 | Did not advance | | |
| 75 | Claude Carmona | France | 9.45 | 9.20 | 18.65 | Did not advance | | |
| 75 | Álvaro Montesinos | Spain | 9.35 | 9.30 | 18.65 | Did not advance | | |
| 75 | Bernhard Simmelbauer | West Germany | 9.05 | 9.60 | 18.65 | Did not advance | | |
| 78 | Mike Beckmann | West Germany | 9.45 | 9.15 | 18.60 | Did not advance | | |
| 78 | Miguel Ángel Rubio | Spain | 8.80 | 9.80 | 18.60 | Did not advance | | |
| 78 | Josef Zellweger | Switzerland | 9.50 | 9.10 | 18.60 | Did not advance | | |
| 81 | Stéphane Cauterman | France | 8.90 | 9.60 | 18.50 | Did not advance | | |
| 82 | Scott Johnson | United States | 8.75 | 9.60 | 18.35 | Did not advance | | |
| 83 | Chang Chao-chun | Chinese Taipei | 9.00 | 8.95 | 17.95 | Did not advance | | |
| 84 | Kenneth Meredith | Australia | 8.75 | 9.15 | 17.90 | Did not advance | | |
| 85 | Jürgen Brümmer | West Germany | 8.55 | 9.30 | 17.85 | Did not advance | | |
| 85 | Jože Kolman | Yugoslavia | 8.25 | 9.60 | 17.85 | Did not advance | | |
| 87 | Andrew Morris | Great Britain | 8.80 | 8.80 | 17.60 | Did not advance | | |
| 88 | Hélder Pinheiro | Portugal | 9.20 | 8.35 | 17.55 | Did not advance | | |
| 89 | Tony Piñeda | Mexico | 9.50 | 2.00 | 11.50 | Did not advance | | |
