= Gymnastics at the 1988 Summer Olympics – Men's vault =

Olympic gymnastics event

Men's vault at the Games of the XXIV Olympiad
- Artistic gymnastics pictogram
- Venue: Olympic Gymnastics Hall
- Date: 18–24 September 1988
- Competitors: 89 from 23 nations

Medalists
1st place, gold medalist(s)		Lou Yun	China
2nd place, silver medalist(s)		Sylvio Kroll	East Germany
3rd place, bronze medalist(s)		Park Jong-Hoon	South Korea

The men's vault competition was one of eight events for male competitors in artistic gymnastics at the 1988 Summer Olympics in Seoul. The qualification and final rounds took place on September 18, 20 and 24th at the Olympic Gymnastics Hall. There were 89 competitors from 23 nations, with nations competing in the team event having 6 gymnasts and other nations having up to 3 gymnasts. The event was won by Lou Yun of China, the second man to successfully defend an Olympic title in the vault and fourth man to win two medals of any color in the event. Sylvio Kroll of East Germany took the silver medal, while Park Jong-hoon of South Korea earned his nation's first men's vault medal with his bronze.

== Background ==
This was the 17th appearance of the event, which is one of the five apparatus events held every time there were apparatus events at the Summer Olympics (no apparatus events were held in 1900, 1908, 1912, or 1920). Two of the eight finalists from 1984 returned, both of the Chinese finalists: gold medalist Lou Yun and one of the four silver medalists, Li Ning. Lou had finished second in the 1985 World Championships and shared gold with Sylvio Kroll of East Germany in the 1987 World Championships; the defending champion was heavily favored to repeat.

Chinese Taipei made its debut in the men's vault. The United States made its 15th appearance, most of any nation; the Americans had missed only the inaugural 1896 vault and the boycotted 1980 Games.

== Competition format ==
The event used a "vaulting horse" aligned parallel to the gymnast's run (rather than the modern "vaulting table" in use since 2004). Each nation entered a team of six gymnasts or up to three individual gymnasts. All entrants in the gymnastics competitions performed both a compulsory exercise and a voluntary exercise for each apparatus. The scores for all 12 exercises were summed to give an individual all-around score. These exercise scores were also used for qualification for the apparatus finals. The two exercises (compulsory and voluntary) for each apparatus were summed to give an apparatus score. Half of the preliminary score carried over to the final. The 1984 Games had expanded the number of finalists from six to eight. Nations were still limited to two finalists each. Others were ranked 9th through 89th.

== Schedule ==
All times are Korea Standard Time adjusted for daylight savings (UTC+10)

Date	Time	Round
Sunday, 18 September 1988		Preliminary: Compulsory
Tuesday, 20 September 1988		Preliminary: Voluntary
Saturday, 24 September 1988	13:40	Final

== Results ==
Eighty-nine gymnasts competed in the vault event during the compulsory and optional rounds on September 18 and 20. The eight highest scoring gymnasts advanced to the final on September 24. Each country was limited to two competitors in the final. Half of the points earned by each gymnast during both the compulsory and optional rounds carried over to the final. This constitutes the "prelim" score.

Rank	Gymnast	Nation	Preliminary			Final		
Rank	Gymnast	Nation	Compulsory	Voluntary	Total	1/2 Prelim.	Final	Total
1st place, gold medalist(s)	Lou Yun	China	9.90	9.95	19.85	9.925	9.950	19.875
2nd place, silver medalist(s)	Sylvio Kroll	East Germany	9.85	9.95	19.80	9.900	9.962	19.862
3rd place, bronze medalist(s)	Park Jong-Hoon	South Korea	9.85	9.75	19.60	9.800	9.975	19.775
4	Deyan Kolev	Bulgaria	9.80	9.85	19.65	9.825	9.912	19.737
5	Holger Behrendt	East Germany	9.80	9.90	19.70	9.850	9.800	19.650
6	Sergey Kharkov	Soviet Union	9.85	9.95	19.80	9.900	9.700	19.600
7	Yukio Iketani	Japan	9.90	9.75	19.65	9.825	9.700	19.525
8	Vladimir Gogoladze	Soviet Union	9.90	9.85	19.75	9.875	9.637	19.512
9	Vladimir Artemov	Soviet Union	9.85	9.80	19.65	Did not advance		
10	Dmitri Bilozertchev	Soviet Union	9.80	9.80	19.60	Did not advance		
10	Ralf Büchner	East Germany	9.80	9.80	19.60	Did not advance		
10	Valeri Liukin	Soviet Union	9.70	9.90	19.60	Did not advance		
13	Jürgen Brümmer	West Germany	9.85	9.70	19.55	Did not advance		
13	Sven Tippelt	East Germany	9.75	9.80	19.55	Did not advance		
15	Marius Gherman	Romania	9.70	9.80	19.50	Did not advance		
15	Wang Chongsheng	China	9.65	9.85	19.50	Did not advance		
15	Xu Zhiqiang	China	9.80	9.70	19.50	Did not advance		
18	Gyorgy Guczoghy	Hungary	9.75	9.70	19.45	Did not advance		
18	Curtis Hibbert	Canada	9.70	9.75	19.45	Did not advance		
18	Ulf Hoffmann	East Germany	9.70	9.75	19.45	Did not advance		
18	Dimitar Taskov	Bulgaria	9.65	9.80	19.45	Did not advance		
22	Terry Bartlett	Great Britain	9.80	9.60	19.40	Did not advance		
22	Patrick Mattioni	France	9.75	9.65	19.40	Did not advance		
22	Daisuke Nishikawa	Japan	9.75	9.65	19.40	Did not advance		
22	Alfonso Rodríguez	Spain	9.80	9.60	19.40	Did not advance		
26	Lorne Bobkin	Canada	9.70	9.65	19.35	Did not advance		
26	Zsolt Borkai	Hungary	9.80	9.55	19.35	Did not advance		
26	Guo Linxian	China	9.65	9.70	19.35	Did not advance		
26	Zsolt Horváth	Hungary	9.65	9.70	19.35	Did not advance		
26	Koichi Mizushima	Japan	9.70	9.65	19.35	Did not advance		
26	Toshiharu Sato	Japan	9.70	9.65	19.35	Did not advance		
26	Song Yu-jin	South Korea	9.85	9.50	19.35	Did not advance		
33	Jury Chechi	Italy	9.70	9.60	19.30	Did not advance		
33	Petar Georgiev	Bulgaria	9.60	9.70	19.30	Did not advance		
33	Ralph Kern	West Germany	9.80	9.50	19.30	Did not advance		
33	Kalofer Khristozov	Bulgaria	9.65	9.65	19.30	Did not advance		
33	Marius Toba	Romania	9.70	9.60	19.30	Did not advance		
33	Andreas Wecker	East Germany	9.65	9.65	19.30	Did not advance		
39	Mike Beckmann	West Germany	9.65	9.60	19.25	Did not advance		
39	Vladimir Novikov	Soviet Union	9.80	9.45	19.25	Did not advance		
39	Jenő Paprika	Hungary	9.65	9.60	19.25	Did not advance		
42	Csaba Fajkusz	Hungary	9.50	9.70	19.20	Did not advance		
42	Scott Johnson	United States	9.50	9.70	19.20	Did not advance		
42	Charles Lakes	United States	9.60	9.60	19.20	Did not advance		
42	James Rozon	Canada	9.60	9.60	19.20	Did not advance		
46	Lyubomir Gueraskov	Bulgaria	9.60	9.55	19.15	Did not advance		
46	Hiroyuki Konishi	Japan	9.55	9.60	19.15	Did not advance		
46	Boris Preti	Italy	9.75	9.40	19.15	Did not advance		
46	Bernhard Simmelbauer	West Germany	9.65	9.50	19.15	Did not advance		
50	Paolo Bucci	Italy	9.60	9.50	19.10	Did not advance		
50	Li Chunyang	China	9.50	9.60	19.10	Did not advance		
50	Álvaro Montesinos	Spain	9.55	9.55	19.10	Did not advance		
50	Brad Peters	Canada	9.60	9.50	19.10	Did not advance		
50	Lance Ringnald	United States	9.40	9.70	19.10	Did not advance		
50	Gabriele Sala	Italy	9.50	9.60	19.10	Did not advance		
50	Adrian Sandu	Romania	9.70	9.40	19.10	Did not advance		
50	Daniel Winkler	West Germany	9.50	9.60	19.10	Did not advance		
58	Ju Yeong-sam	South Korea	9.75	9.30	19.05	Did not advance		
58	Alan Nolet	Canada	9.45	9.60	19.05	Did not advance		
60	Claude Carmona	France	9.50	9.50	19.00	Did not advance		
60	Christian Chevalier	France	9.70	9.30	19.00	Did not advance		
60	Johan Jonasson	Sweden	9.50	9.50	19.00	Did not advance		
60	Thierry Pecqueux	France	9.50	9.50	19.00	Did not advance		
60	Valentin Pîntea	Romania	9.60	9.40	19.00	Did not advance		
60	Wes Suter	United States	9.50	9.50	19.00	Did not advance		
60	Takahiro Yamada	Japan	9.40	9.60	19.00	Did not advance		
67	Vittorio Allievi	Italy	9.45	9.45	18.90	Did not advance		
67	Stoyko Gochev	Bulgaria	9.30	9.60	18.90	Did not advance		
67	Jože Kolman	Yugoslavia	9.50	9.40	18.90	Did not advance		
67	Frédéric Longuepée	France	9.70	9.20	18.90	Did not advance		
67	Kenneth Meredith	Australia	9.40	9.50	18.90	Did not advance		
67	Riccardo Trapella	Italy	9.30	9.60	18.90	Did not advance		
73	Nicolae Bejenaru	Romania	9.35	9.50	18.85	Did not advance		
73	Stéphane Cauterman	France	9.35	9.50	18.85	Did not advance		
73	Chang Chao-chun	Chinese Taipei	9.15	9.70	18.85	Did not advance		
73	Dominick Minicucci	United States	9.50	9.35	18.85	Did not advance		
77	Andrew Morris	Great Britain	9.35	9.45	18.80	Did not advance		
77	Josef Zellweger	Switzerland	9.30	9.50	18.80	Did not advance		
79	Bruno Cavelti	Switzerland	9.50	9.25	18.75	Did not advance		
79	Kevin Davis	United States	9.30	9.45	18.75	Did not advance		
79	Marian Rizan	Romania	9.40	9.35	18.75	Did not advance		
79	Miguel Ángel Rubio	Spain	9.60	9.15	18.75	Did not advance		
83	Gil Pinto	Brazil	9.40	9.30	18.70	Did not advance		
84	Philippe Chartrand	Canada	9.45	9.15	18.60	Did not advance		
85	Andreas Aguilar	West Germany	9.35	9.20	18.55	Did not advance		
86	Li Ning	China	9.25	9.15	18.40	Did not advance		
87	Tony Piñeda	Mexico	9.05	9.25	18.30	Did not advance		
88	Hélder Pinheiro	Portugal	8.80	9.15	17.95	Did not advance		
89	Balázs Tóth	Hungary	9.70	0.00	9.70	Did not advance		
