= Gymnastics at the 1988 Summer Olympics – Men's pommel horse =

Olympic gymnastics event

Men's pommel horse at the Games of the XXIV Olympiad
- Olympic Gymnastics Hall
- Venue: Olympic Gymnastics Hall
- Dates: 18–24 September 1988
- Competitors: 89 from 23 nations
- Winning score: 19.950

Medalists
1st place, gold medalist(s)		Lubomir Geraskov; Bulgaria
1st place, gold medalist(s)		Zsolt Borkai; Hungary
1st place, gold medalist(s)		Dmitry Bilozerchev; Soviet Union

The men's pommel horse competition was one of eight events for male competitors in artistic gymnastics at the 1988 Summer Olympics in Seoul. The qualification and final rounds took place on September 18, 20 and 24th at the Olympic Gymnastics Hall. There were 89 competitors from 23 nations, with nations competing in the team event having 6 gymnasts and other nations having up to 3 gymnasts. For the second time (the first was in 1948), the event ended in a three-way tie for first place. Dmitry Bilozerchev of the Soviet Union, Zsolt Borkai of Hungary, and Lubomir Geraskov of Bulgaria each received a gold medal. It was Bulgaria's first medal in the pommel horse. Hungary had its third gold medal in four Games, with Zoltán Magyar winning in 1976 and 1980 before the nation was part of the Soviet-led boycott in 1984. The Soviets had had an eight-Games medal streak in the event snapped by that boycott; Bilozerchev's medal put the nation back on the podium after that one-Games absence.

== Background ==
This was the 17th appearance of the event, which is one of the five apparatus events held every time there were apparatus events at the Summer Olympics (no apparatus events were held in 1900, 1908, 1912, or 1920). Two of the eight finalists from 1984 returned: gold medalist Li Ning of China and eighth-place finisher Josef Zellweger of Switzerland. There were two reigning world champions, as Soviet Dmitry Bilozerchev and Hungarian Zsolt Borkai had tied. Bulgarian Lubomir Geraskov was the bronze medalist at the world championships.

Chinese Taipei made its debut in the men's pommel horse. The United States made its 15th appearance, most of any nation; the Americans had missed only the inaugural 1896 pommel horse and the boycotted 1980 Games.

== Competition format ==
Each nation entered a team of six gymnasts or up to three individual gymnasts. All entrants in the gymnastics competitions performed both a compulsory exercise and a voluntary exercise for each apparatus. The scores for all 12 exercises were summed to give an individual all-around score. These exercise scores were also used for qualification for the apparatus finals. The two exercises (compulsory and voluntary) for each apparatus were summed to give an apparatus score. Half of the preliminary score carried over to the final. The 1984 Games had expanded the number of finalists from six to eight. Nations were still limited to two finalists each. Others were ranked 9th through 89th.

== Schedule ==
All times are Korea Standard Time adjusted for daylight savings (UTC+10)

Date	Time	Round
Sunday, 18 September 1988		Preliminary: Compulsory
Tuesday, 20 September 1988		Preliminary: Voluntary
Saturday, 24 September 1988	12:30	Final

== Results ==
Eighty-nine gymnasts competed in the pommel horse event during the compulsory and optional rounds on September 18 and 20. The eight highest scoring gymnasts advanced to the final on September 24. Each country was limited to two competitors in the final. Half of the points earned by each gymnast during both the compulsory and optional rounds carried over to the final. This constitutes the "prelim" score.

Rank	Gymnast	Nation	Preliminary			Final		
Rank	Gymnast	Nation	Compulsory	Voluntary	Total	1/2 Prelim.	Final	Total
1st place, gold medalist(s)	Lubomir Geraskov	Bulgaria	9.90	10.00	19.90	9.950	10.000	19.950
1st place, gold medalist(s)	Zsolt Borkai	Hungary	9.90	10.00	19.90	9.950	10.000	19.950
1st place, gold medalist(s)	Dmitri Bilozertchev	Soviet Union	9.90	10.00	19.90	9.950	10.000	19.950
4	Koichi Mizushima	Japan	9.90	10.00	19.90	9.950	9.950	19.900
5	Valeri Liukin	Soviet Union	9.85	10.00	19.85	9.925	9.950	19.875
6	Daisuke Nishikawa	Japan	9.80	10.00	19.80	9.900	9.950	19.850
7	Sven Tippelt	East Germany	9.80	9.90	19.70	9.850	9.950	19.800
8	Sylvio Kroll	East Germany	9.80	9.95	19.75	9.875	9.900	19.775
9	Vladimir Artemov	Soviet Union	9.80	9.95	19.75	Did not advance		
10	Vladimir Novikov	Soviet Union	9.80	9.90	19.70	Did not advance		
10	Marian Rizan	Romania	9.80	9.90	19.70	Did not advance		
12	Sergey Kharkov	Soviet Union	9.75	9.90	19.65	Did not advance		
12	Toshiharu Sato	Japan	9.75	9.90	19.65	Did not advance		
12	Dimitar Taskov	Bulgaria	9.75	9.90	19.65	Did not advance		
15	Marius Gherman	Romania	9.80	9.80	19.60	Did not advance		
15	Gyorgy Guczoghy	Hungary	9.70	9.90	19.60	Did not advance		
15	Boris Preti	Italy	9.70	9.90	19.60	Did not advance		
15	Wang Chongsheng	China	9.75	9.85	19.60	Did not advance		
19	Petar Georgiev	Bulgaria	9.75	9.80	19.55	Did not advance		
19	Kalofer Khristozov	Bulgaria	9.65	9.90	19.55	Did not advance		
19	Hiroyuki Konishi	Japan	9.65	9.90	19.55	Did not advance		
22	Ralf Büchner	East Germany	9.70	9.80	19.50	Did not advance		
22	Jury Chechi	Italy	9.60	9.90	19.50	Did not advance		
22	Kevin Davis	United States	9.70	9.80	19.50	Did not advance		
22	Csaba Fajkusz	Hungary	9.75	9.75	19.50	Did not advance		
22	Vladimir Gogoladze	Soviet Union	9.70	9.80	19.50	Did not advance		
22	Yukio Iketani	Japan	9.70	9.80	19.50	Did not advance		
28	Mike Beckmann	West Germany	9.70	9.75	19.45	Did not advance		
28	Brad Peters	Canada	9.70	9.75	19.45	Did not advance		
30	Paolo Bucci	Italy	9.50	9.90	19.40	Did not advance		
30	Stéphane Cauterman	France	9.50	9.90	19.40	Did not advance		
30	Christian Chevalier	France	9.60	9.80	19.40	Did not advance		
30	Charles Lakes	United States	9.60	9.80	19.40	Did not advance		
30	Li Chunyang	China	9.60	9.80	19.40	Did not advance		
35	Nicolae Bejenaru	Romania	9.60	9.75	19.35	Did not advance		
36	Takahiro Yamada	Japan	9.55	9.75	19.30	Did not advance		
36	Claude Carmona	France	9.60	9.70	19.30	Did not advance		
36	Ulf Hoffmann	East Germany	9.60	9.70	19.30	Did not advance		
36	Marius Toba	Romania	9.60	9.70	19.30	Did not advance		
40	Johan Jonasson	Sweden	9.55	9.70	19.25	Did not advance		
40	Jenő Paprika	Hungary	9.55	9.70	19.25	Did not advance		
42	Riccardo Trapella	Italy	9.40	9.80	19.20	Did not advance		
43	Li Ning	China	9.80	9.35	19.15	Did not advance		
43	Valentin Pîntea	Romania	9.50	9.65	19.15	Did not advance		
43	Josef Zellweger	Switzerland	9.40	9.75	19.15	Did not advance		
46	Stoyko Gochev	Bulgaria	9.35	9.75	19.10	Did not advance		
46	Patrick Mattioni	France	9.30	9.80	19.10	Did not advance		
46	Alan Nolet	Canada	9.55	9.55	19.10	Did not advance		
46	Thierry Pecqueux	France	9.40	9.70	19.10	Did not advance		
46	Lance Ringnald	United States	9.40	9.70	19.10	Did not advance		
51	Lorne Bobkin	Canada	9.40	9.65	19.05	Did not advance		
51	Lou Yun	China	9.20	9.85	19.05	Did not advance		
51	Hélder Pinheiro	Portugal	9.45	9.60	19.05	Did not advance		
51	Gabriele Sala	Italy	9.35	9.70	19.05	Did not advance		
51	Wes Suter	United States	9.45	9.60	19.05	Did not advance		
56	Ralph Kern	West Germany	9.40	9.60	19.00	Did not advance		
56	Deyan Kolev	Bulgaria	9.50	9.50	19.00	Did not advance		
56	Xu Zhiqiang	China	9.70	9.30	19.00	Did not advance		
59	Holger Behrendt	East Germany	9.70	9.25	18.95	Did not advance		
59	Jürgen Brümmer	West Germany	9.35	9.60	18.95	Did not advance		
59	Philippe Chartrand	Canada	9.35	9.60	18.95	Did not advance		
59	Adrian Sandu	Romania	9.70	9.25	18.95	Did not advance		
63	Dominick Minicucci	United States	9.30	9.60	18.90	Did not advance		
63	Andreas Wecker	East Germany	9.05	9.85	18.90	Did not advance		
63	Daniel Winkler	West Germany	9.40	9.50	18.90	Did not advance		
66	Guo Linxian	China	9.10	9.75	18.85	Did not advance		
66	Zsolt Horváth	Hungary	9.55	9.30	18.85	Did not advance		
66	James Rozon	Canada	9.35	9.50	18.85	Did not advance		
69	Vittorio Allievi	Italy	9.00	9.80	18.80	Did not advance		
69	Bruno Cavelti	Switzerland	9.30	9.50	18.80	Did not advance		
69	Bernhard Simmelbauer	West Germany	9.20	9.60	18.80	Did not advance		
72	Curtis Hibbert	Canada	9.60	9.15	18.75	Did not advance		
72	Andrew Morris	Great Britain	9.20	9.55	18.75	Did not advance		
74	Kenneth Meredith	Australia	9.15	9.55	18.70	Did not advance		
75	Andreas Aguilar	West Germany	9.50	9.10	18.60	Did not advance		
75	Park Jong-Hoon	South Korea	9.45	9.15	18.60	Did not advance		
75	Alfonso Rodríguez	Spain	9.05	9.55	18.60	Did not advance		
78	Frédéric Longuepée	France	9.30	9.25	18.55	Did not advance		
79	Scott Johnson	United States	8.85	9.65	18.50	Did not advance		
79	Jože Kolman	Yugoslavia	9.30	9.20	18.50	Did not advance		
81	Ju Yeong-sam	South Korea	9.65	8.80	18.45	Did not advance		
81	Miguel Ángel Rubio	Spain	9.45	9.00	18.45	Did not advance		
83	Álvaro Montesinos	Spain	9.30	8.95	18.25	Did not advance		
84	Chang Chao-chun	Chinese Taipei	8.75	9.30	18.05	Did not advance		
85	Terry Bartlett	Great Britain	9.35	8.60	17.95	Did not advance		
86	Song Yu-jin	South Korea	8.55	9.00	17.55	Did not advance		
86	Gil Pinto	Brazil	8.45	9.10	17.55	Did not advance		
88	Tony Piñeda	Mexico	8.75	8.30	17.05	Did not advance		
89	Balázs Tóth	Hungary	9.70	0.00	9.70	Did not advance		
