= 1988 Summer Olympics medal table =

1988 Summer Olympics medals
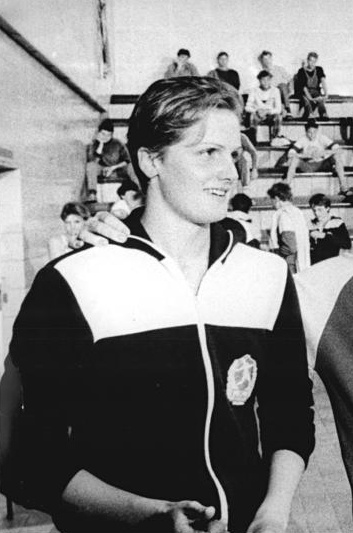
- Kristin Otto of East Germany won the most gold medals at the 1988 Summer Olympics, winning six gold medals in women's swimming.
- Location: Seoul, South Korea

Highlights
- Most gold medals: Soviet Union (55)
- Most total medals: Soviet Union (132)
- Medalling NOCs: 52

World map showing the medal achievements of each country during the 1988 Summer Olympics Legend: represents countries that won at least one gold medal. represents countries that won at least one silver medal but no gold medals. represents countries that won at least one bronze medal (no gold or silver). represents participating countries that did not win medals. represents entities that did not participate at the 1988 Summer Olympics.

The 1988 Summer Olympics, officially known as the Games of the XXIV Olympiad, were an international multi-sport event held in Seoul, South Korea, from 17 September to 2 October 1988. A total of 8,397 athletes representing 159 National Olympic Committees (NOCs) participated in 237 events in 23 sports across 31 different disciplines. Table tennis was introduced to the Summer Olympic Games program at these games, while tennis was reintroduced following its removal after the 1924 Summer Olympics in Paris, France.

Overall, athletes representing 52 NOCs received at least one medal, and 31 NOCs won at least one gold medal. The Soviet Union won the most gold medals and the most overall medals, with 55 and 132 respectively. Suriname's team won their first Olympic gold medal, which was also their first Olympic medal of any color. The other teams that earned their first Olympic medal were Costa Rica, Djibouti, Indonesia, the Netherlands Antilles, Senegal, and the United States Virgin Islands, for Netherlands Antilles, it was their only Olympic medal before the country's dissolution in 2010.

Swimmer Kristin Otto of East Germany won the most gold medals for an individual at the games, with six gold medals. Fellow swimmer Matt Biondi of the United States won the most overall medals, winning seven medals with five golds, one silver, and one bronze, tying Mark Spitz's record for most medals won in a single games.

== Medals table ==
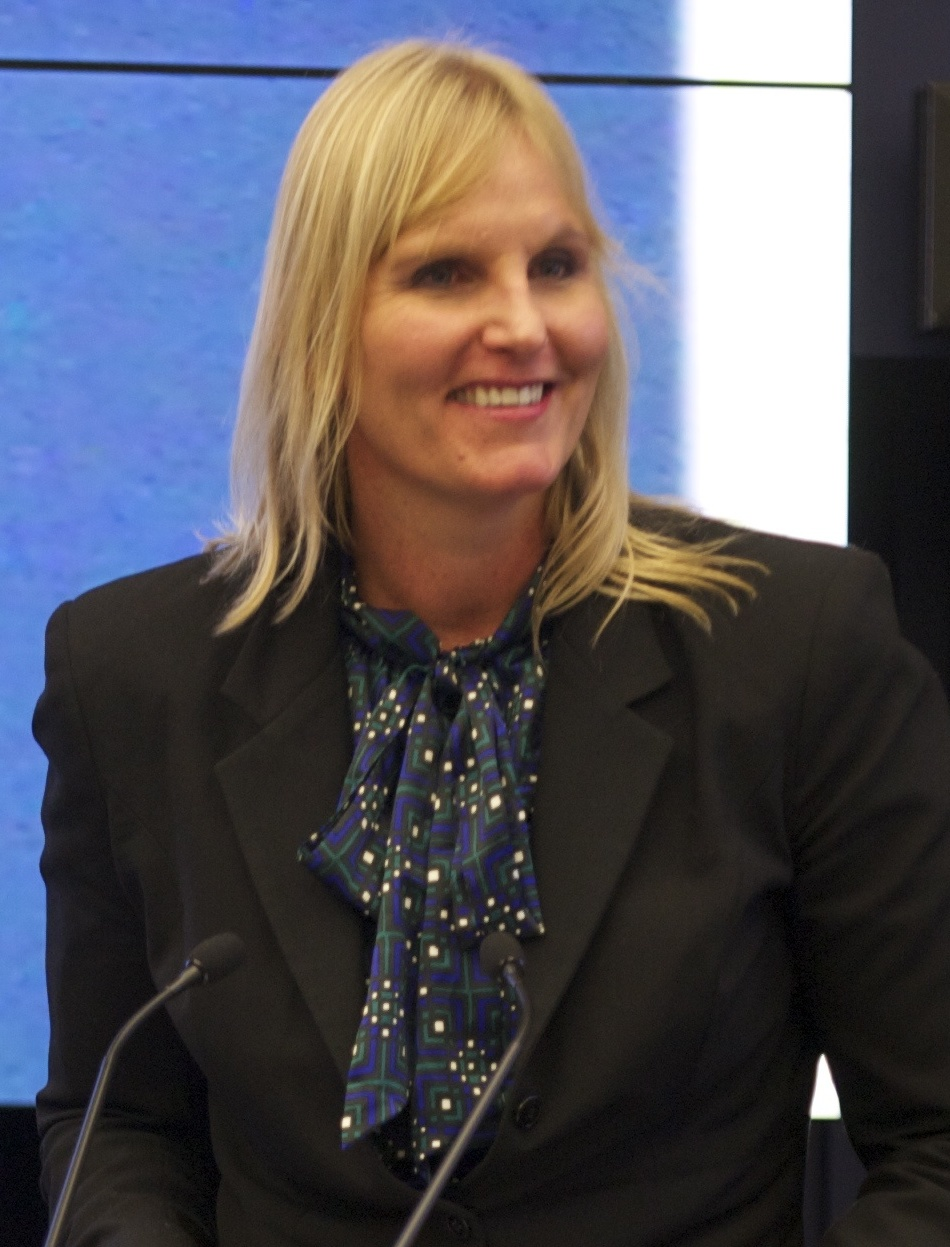
Swimmer Sylvia Poll, the first-ever Olympic medalist for Costa Rica

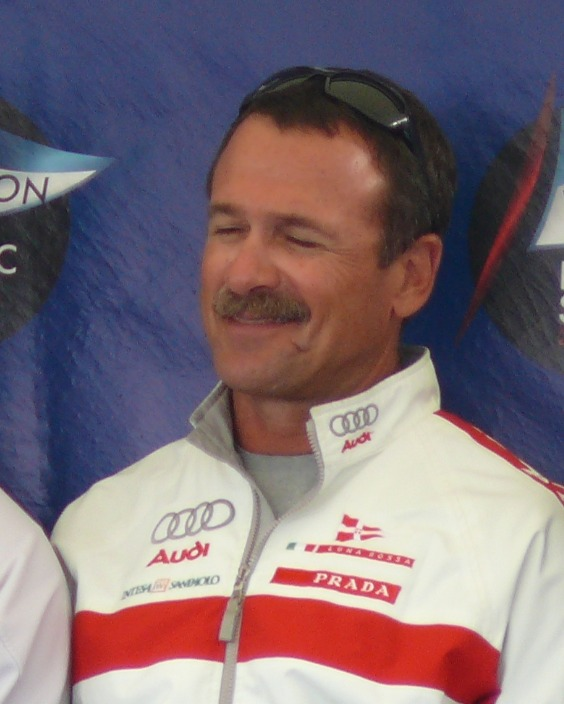
Sailor Peter Holmberg, the first-ever Olympic medalist for the United States Virgin Islands

The medal table is based on information provided by the International Olympic Committee (IOC) and is consistent with IOC's conventional sorting in its published medal tables. The table uses the Olympic medal table sorting method. By default, the table is ordered by the number of gold medals won by athletes from each nation, where a nation is an entity represented by a NOC. The number of silver medals is taken into consideration next, and then the number of bronze medals. If teams are still tied, equal ranking is given and they are listed alphabetically by their IOC country code.

Events in boxing resulted in a bronze medal being awarded to each of the two competitors who lost their semi-final matches, as opposed to fighting in a third place tiebreaker. Events in judo used a repechage system which also results in two bronze medals being awarded.

In the gymnastics events, there were five ties for medals. Three gold medals and no silver or bronze medals were awarded due to a three-way first-place tie in the men's pommel horse. Two gold medals and no silver medal were awarded in the men's horizontal bar and men's rings, with the former also having a tie for bronze. Two bronze medals were awarded in the men's floor and women's balance beam events. Outside of gymnastics, the men's high jump in athletics and the women's 50 metre freestyle in swimming both resulted in two bronzes being awarded due to third-place ties.

* Host nation (South Korea)

1988 Summer Olympics medal table
Rank	NOC	Gold	Silver	Bronze	Total
1	Soviet Union	55	31	46	132
2	East Germany	37	35	30	102
3	United States	36	31	27	94
4	South Korea*	12	10	11	33
5	West Germany	11	14	15	40
6	Hungary	11	6	6	23
7	Bulgaria	10	12	13	35
8	Romania	7	11	6	24
9	France	6	4	6	16
10	Italy	6	4	4	14
11	China	5	11	12	28
12	Great Britain	5	10	9	24
13	Kenya	5	2	2	9
14	Japan	4	3	7	14
15	Australia	3	6	5	14
16	Yugoslavia	3	4	5	12
17	Czechoslovakia	3	3	2	8
18	New Zealand	3	2	8	13
19	Canada	3	2	5	10
20	Poland	2	5	9	16
21	Norway	2	3	0	5
22	Netherlands	2	2	5	9
23	Denmark	2	1	1	4
24	Brazil	1	2	3	6
25	Finland	1	1	2	4
25	Spain	1	1	2	4
27	Turkey	1	1	0	2
28	Morocco	1	0	2	3
29	Austria	1	0	0	1
29	Portugal	1	0	0	1
29	Suriname	1	0	0	1
32	Sweden	0	4	7	11
33	Switzerland	0	2	2	4
34	Jamaica	0	2	0	2
35	Argentina	0	1	1	2
36	Chile	0	1	0	1
36	Costa Rica	0	1	0	1
36	Indonesia	0	1	0	1
36	Iran	0	1	0	1
36	Netherlands Antilles	0	1	0	1
36	Peru	0	1	0	1
36	Senegal	0	1	0	1
36	Virgin Islands	0	1	0	1
44	Belgium	0	0	2	2
44	Mexico	0	0	2	2
46	Colombia	0	0	1	1
46	Djibouti	0	0	1	1
46	Greece	0	0	1	1
46	Mongolia	0	0	1	1
46	Pakistan	0	0	1	1
46	Philippines	0	0	1	1
46	Thailand	0	0	1	1
Totals (52 entries)		241	234	264	739

== Changes due to doping ==
Key

※ Disqualified athlete(s)

List of official changes in medal standings
Ruling date	Sport/Event	Athlete (NOC)	1st place, gold medalist(s)	2nd place, silver medalist(s)	3rd place, bronze medalist(s)	Total	Notes
22 September 1988	Weightlifting, Men's 56 kg	Bulgaria Mitko Grablev ※	−1			−1	Mitko Grablev was disqualified after testing positive for furosemide and became the first doping case of the 1988 Summer Olympics. The medals were then reallocated, with Okzen Mirzoyan of the Soviet Union awarded the gold, He Yingqiang of China the silver, and Liu Shoubin of China the bronze.
22 September 1988	Weightlifting, Men's 56 kg	Soviet Union Oksen Mirzoyan	+1	−1		0	Mitko Grablev was disqualified after testing positive for furosemide and became the first doping case of the 1988 Summer Olympics. The medals were then reallocated, with Okzen Mirzoyan of the Soviet Union awarded the gold, He Yingqiang of China the silver, and Liu Shoubin of China the bronze.
22 September 1988	Weightlifting, Men's 56 kg	China He Yingqiang		+1	−1	0	Mitko Grablev was disqualified after testing positive for furosemide and became the first doping case of the 1988 Summer Olympics. The medals were then reallocated, with Okzen Mirzoyan of the Soviet Union awarded the gold, He Yingqiang of China the silver, and Liu Shoubin of China the bronze.
22 September 1988	Weightlifting, Men's 56 kg	China Liu Shoubin			+1	+1	Mitko Grablev was disqualified after testing positive for furosemide and became the first doping case of the 1988 Summer Olympics. The medals were then reallocated, with Okzen Mirzoyan of the Soviet Union awarded the gold, He Yingqiang of China the silver, and Liu Shoubin of China the bronze.
24 September 1988	Weightlifting, Men's 67.5 kg	Bulgaria Angel Genchev ※	−1			−1	Angel Genchev was disqualified after testing positive for furosemide, with the gold medal being awarded to Joachim Kunz of East Germany, the silver medal to Israel Militosyan of the Soviet Union, and the bronze medal to Li Jinhe of China. After Grablev and Genchev were stripped of their titles, Bulgarian officials commented that they condemned the usage of drugs in sport, and withdrew their remaining weightlifters in protest at the decision.
24 September 1988	Weightlifting, Men's 67.5 kg	East Germany Joachim Kunz	+1	−1		0	Angel Genchev was disqualified after testing positive for furosemide, with the gold medal being awarded to Joachim Kunz of East Germany, the silver medal to Israel Militosyan of the Soviet Union, and the bronze medal to Li Jinhe of China. After Grablev and Genchev were stripped of their titles, Bulgarian officials commented that they condemned the usage of drugs in sport, and withdrew their remaining weightlifters in protest at the decision.
24 September 1988	Weightlifting, Men's 67.5 kg	Soviet Union Israel Militosyan		+1	−1	0	Angel Genchev was disqualified after testing positive for furosemide, with the gold medal being awarded to Joachim Kunz of East Germany, the silver medal to Israel Militosyan of the Soviet Union, and the bronze medal to Li Jinhe of China. After Grablev and Genchev were stripped of their titles, Bulgarian officials commented that they condemned the usage of drugs in sport, and withdrew their remaining weightlifters in protest at the decision.
24 September 1988	Weightlifting, Men's 67.5 kg	China Li Jinhe			+1	+1	Angel Genchev was disqualified after testing positive for furosemide, with the gold medal being awarded to Joachim Kunz of East Germany, the silver medal to Israel Militosyan of the Soviet Union, and the bronze medal to Li Jinhe of China. After Grablev and Genchev were stripped of their titles, Bulgarian officials commented that they condemned the usage of drugs in sport, and withdrew their remaining weightlifters in protest at the decision.
27 September 1988	Athletics, Men's 100 metres	Canada Ben Johnson ※	−1			−1	Three days after Ben Johnson won the 100 metres title and set a world record of 9.79 seconds, Park Jong-sei of the IOC's Olympic Doping Control Center saw that Johnson's urine sample tested positive for stanozolol. Johnson was subsequently disqualified with the medals being reallocated. Carl Lewis of the United States was awarded the gold and the world record was transferred to him, Linford Christie of Great Britain was awarded the silver, and Calvin Smith of the United States was awarded the bronze.
27 September 1988	Athletics, Men's 100 metres	United States Carl Lewis	+1	−1		0	
27 September 1988	Athletics, Men's 100 metres	Great Britain Linford Christie		+1	−1	0	
27 September 1988	Athletics, Men's 100 metres	United States Calvin Smith			+1	+1	
28 September 1988	Weightlifting, Men's 100 kg	Hungary Andor Szanyi ※		−1		−1	Andor Szanyi, who originally won the silver medal in the men's 100 kg event in weightlifting two days before, tested positive for stanozolol and was disqualified afterwards. The silver was then awarded to Nicu Vlad of Romania and the bronze was awarded to Peter Immesberger of West Germany.
28 September 1988	Weightlifting, Men's 100 kg	Romania Nicu Vlad		+1	−1	0	Andor Szanyi, who originally won the silver medal in the men's 100 kg event in weightlifting two days before, tested positive for stanozolol and was disqualified afterwards. The silver was then awarded to Nicu Vlad of Romania and the bronze was awarded to Peter Immesberger of West Germany.
28 September 1988	Weightlifting, Men's 100 kg	West Germany Peter Immesberger			+1	+1	Andor Szanyi, who originally won the silver medal in the men's 100 kg event in weightlifting two days before, tested positive for stanozolol and was disqualified afterwards. The silver was then awarded to Nicu Vlad of Romania and the bronze was awarded to Peter Immesberger of West Germany.

List of official changes by country
NOC	Gold	Silver	Bronze	Net Change
Bulgaria	−2	0	0	−2
Canada	−1	0	0	−1
China	0	+1	+1	+2
East Germany	+1	−1	0	0
West Germany	0	0	+1	+1
Great Britain	0	+1	−1	0
Hungary	0	−1	0	−1
Romania	0	+1	−1	0
Soviet Union	+1	0	−1	0
United States	+1	−1	+1	+1

== See also ==
- All-time Olympic Games medal table
- 1988 Summer Paralympics medal table
- 1988 Winter Olympics medal table
