= 1987 European Men's Artistic Gymnastics Championships =

17th European Men's Artistic Gymnastics Championships
- Location: Moscow, Soviet Union
- Start date: 21 May 1987
- End date: 24 May 1987

The 17th European Men's Artistic Gymnastics Championships was held in Moscow, Soviet Union from 21–24 May 1987.

== Medalists ==
Event	Gold	Silver	Bronze
All-around	(Soviet Union) Valeri Liukin	(Soviet Union) Yuri Korolyov	(Hungary) György Guczoghy
Floor	(Soviet Union) Valeri Liukin	(Soviet Union) Yuri Korolyov	(Hungary) György Guczoghy
Pommel horse	(Soviet Union) Valeri Liukin	(Bulgaria) Lubomir Geraskov	(Romania) Marian Rizan
Rings	(Soviet Union) Valentin Mogilny	(Soviet Union) Valeri Liukin	(West Germany) Andreas Aguilar
Vault	(Soviet Union) Yuri Korolyov	(East Germany) Sylvio Kroll	(East Germany) Holger Behrendt (Soviet Union) Valeri Liukin
Parallel bars	(Soviet Union) Valeri Liukin	(East Germany) Holger Behrendt	(East Germany) Maik Belle (Romania) Marian Rizan
Horizontal bar	(Soviet Union) Valeri Liukin	(Bulgaria) Lubomir Geraskov	(Hungary) György Guczoghy

=== Medal table ===
Rank	Nation	Gold	Silver	Bronze	Total
1	Soviet Union (URS)	7	3	1	11
2	East Germany (GDR)	0	2	2	4
3	Bulgaria (BUL)	0	2	0	2
4	Hungary (HUN)	0	0	3	3
5	Romania (ROM)	0	0	2	2
6	West Germany (FRG)	0	0	1	1
Totals (6 entries)		7	7	9	23

== Results ==
=== All Around ===
All competitors took part in the all-around with no prior qualification. Here are the top 10 finishes.

Rank	Athlete	Nation	Apparatus						Total
Rank	Athlete	Nation	F	PH	R	V	PB	HB	Total
1st place, gold medalist(s)	Valeri Liukin	Soviet Union (URS)	9.950	9.900	9.750	9.800	9.850	9.900	59.150
2nd place, silver medalist(s)	Yuri Korolyov	Soviet Union (URS)	9.800	9.750	9.750	9.900	9.750	9.700	58.650
3rd place, bronze medalist(s)	György Guczoghy	Hungary (HUN)	9.700	9.800	9.700	9.700	9.700	9.800	58.400
4	Sylvio Kroll	East Germany (GDR)	9.450	9.900	9.700	9.800	9.600	9.850	58.300
5	Valentin Mogilny	Soviet Union (URS)	9.750	9.300	9.800	9.700	9.800	9.900	58.250
6	Holger Behrendt	East Germany (GDR)	9.500	9.650	9.650	9.750	9.800	9.250	57.600
7	Marius Gherman	Romania (ROM)	9.450	9.500	9.350	9.650	9.600	9.800	57.350
8	Andreas Aguilar	West Germany (FRG)	9.100	9.500	9.700	9.550	9.650	9.550	57.050
9	Laurent Barbiéri	France (FRA)	9.550	9.150	9.500	9.850	9.400	9.550	57.000
10	Johan Jonasson	Sweden (SWE)	9.500	9.550	9.450	9.550	9.300	9.600	56.950

=== Floor ===
Rank	Gymnast	Total
1st place, gold medalist(s)	(Soviet Union) Valeri Liukin	19.850
2nd place, silver medalist(s)	(Soviet Union) Yuri Korolyov	19.575
3rd place, bronze medalist(s)	(Hungary) György Guczoghy	19.350
4	(France) Laurent Barbiéri	19.250
5	(East Germany) Holger Behrendt	19.225
6	(Italy) Boris Preti	19.150
7	(East Germany) Sylvio Kroll	19.050
8	(Sweden) Johan Jonasson	19.025

=== Pommel horse ===
Rank	Gymnast	Total
1st place, gold medalist(s)	(Soviet Union) Valeri Liukin	19.750
2nd place, silver medalist(s)	(Bulgaria) Lubomir Geraskov	19.600
3rd place, bronze medalist(s)	(Romania) Marian Rizan	19.575
4	(Hungary) Zsolt Borkai	19.550
5	(Soviet Union) Yuri Korolyov	19.525
6	(France) Jean-Luc Cairon	19.500
6	(Hungary) György Guczoghy	19.500
8	(East Germany) Sylvio Kroll	19.000

=== Rings ===
Rank	Gymnast	Total
1st place, gold medalist(s)	(Soviet Union) Valentin Mogilny	19.650
2nd place, silver medalist(s)	(Soviet Union) Valeri Liukin	19.550
3rd place, bronze medalist(s)	(West Germany) Andreas Aguilar	19.500
4	(East Germany) Sylvio Kroll	19.450
5	(Switzerland) Sepp Zellweger	19.425
6	(East Germany) Holger Behrendt	19.400
6	(Hungary) György Guczoghy	19.400
8	(Bulgaria) Kalofer Khristozov	19.350

=== Vault ===
Rank	Gymnast	Total
1st place, gold medalist(s)	(Soviet Union) Yuri Korolyov	19.813
2nd place, silver medalist(s)	(East Germany) Sylvio Kroll	19.625
3rd place, bronze medalist(s)	(East Germany) Holger Behrendt	19.588
3rd place, bronze medalist(s)	(Soviet Union) Valeri Liukin	19.588
5	(Hungary) György Guczoghy	19.363
6	(France) Jean-Luc Cairon	19.350
7	(France) Laurent Barbiéri	19.313
7	(Romania) Marius Gherman	19.313

=== Parallel bars ===
Rank	Gymnast	Total
1st place, gold medalist(s)	(Soviet Union) Valeri Liukin	19.650
2nd place, silver medalist(s)	(East Germany) Holger Behrendt	19.400
3rd place, bronze medalist(s)	(East Germany) Maik Belle	19.375
3rd place, bronze medalist(s)	(Romania) Marian Rizan	19.375
5	(Hungary) György Guczoghy	19.350
6	(West Germany) Andreas Aguilar	19.050
7	(Soviet Union) Valentin Mogilny	19.000
8	(Switzerland) Sepp Zellweger	18.900

=== Horizontal bar ===
Rank	Gymnast	Total
1st place, gold medalist(s)	(Soviet Union) Valeri Liukin	19.800
2nd place, silver medalist(s)	(East Germany) Sylvio Kroll	19.750
3rd place, bronze medalist(s)	(Hungary) György Guczoghy	19.650
4	(Romania) Marius Gherman	19.600
4	(Bulgaria) Dimitar Taskov	19.600
6	(Spain) Alfonso Rodríguez	19.500
7	(Bulgaria) Kalofer Khristozov	19.400
8	(Soviet Union) Valentin Mogilny	19.375
