= Pecqueux =

Pecqueux is a French occupational surname commonly associated with fishermen. Notable people with the surname include:

- Thierry Pecqueux (born 1965), French gymnast
- Véronique Pecqueux-Rolland (born 1972), French handballer
