= 1988 Olympics =

1988 Olympics refers to both:

- The 1988 Winter Olympics, which were held in Calgary, Alberta, Canada
- The 1988 Summer Olympics, which were held in Seoul, South Korea
