= Lubomir Geraskov =

Bulgarian artistic gymnast

Lubomir Gueraskov
- Любомир Герасков
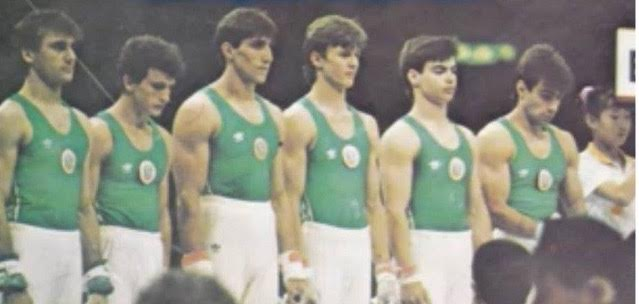
- Gueraskov, far left, with teammates and captain, Stoytcho Gotchev, at the 1988 Olympics in Seoul, South Korea
- Full name: Lubomir Gueraskov
- Born: 27 December 1968 (age 57) Sofia, People's Republic of Bulgaria

Gymnastics career
- Discipline: Men's artistic gymnastics
- Country represented: Bulgaria
- Club: Levski Sofia
Medal record
Representing Bulgaria
Olympic Games
Gold medal – first place	1988 Seoul	Pommel horse
World Championships
Bronze medal – third place	1987 Rotterdam	Pommel horse
Bronze medal – third place	1987 Rotterdam	Floor exercise
European Championships
Silver medal – second place	1987 Moscow	Pommel horse
Silver medal – second place	1987 Moscow	Horizontal bar
Bronze medal – third place	1989 Stockholm	Team
Balkan Cup
Gold medal – first place	1986 Sofia	Individual
Gold medal – first place	1986 Sofia	Team
Bulgarian Cup
Gold medal – first place	1985 Sofia	Individual

Lubomir Gueraskov (Bulgarian: Любомир Герасков, born 27 December 1968) was a Bulgarian gymnast and Olympic champion. He competed at the 1988 Summer Olympics in Seoul where he won Olympic gold on the pommel horse. He also won two bronze medals at the 1987 World Championships, along with assisting his team to a third-place finish at the 1989 European Championships.

== Early life ==
Lubomir Gueraskov was born on 27 December 1968 in his hometown, near the outskirts of Bulgaria's capital and largest city, Sofia. Under the communist law, he was appointed to the youth sports academy where his gymnastics talent grew in popularity amongst top-level coaches.

As a result, he was admitted to a leading Bulgarian youth sports school at a young age. His talent and rapid progress soon attracted national attention. Lubomir became known as a successful gymnast of his generation, winning numerous regional and national titles. During his teenage years, he joined his hometown club, Levski Sofia, contributing to several championship victories. At the same time, he was selected for the national Olympic team, where he achieved broader international recognition.

== Gymnastics career ==
=== World Championships and Olympic Success ===
At 18, Lubomir Geraskov would earn the bronze medal on both the pommel horse and floor exercise at the 1987 World Artistic Gymnastics Championships in Rotterdam. Two years prior, he became individual champion at the 1985 Bulgarian National Gymnastics Championships. Lubomir also helped lead his team to a Balkan Championships in 1986. His peak of glory came two years later when he won the gold medal at the Olympic Games in Seoul, South Korea 1988, scoring a perfect 10.00. Lubomir became the second man in Bulgarian history to win a gold medal in the sport of gymnastics, along with being the youngest, at 19. To top off his gymnastic career, Lubomir was inducted into the Bulgarian Sports Hall of Fame, becoming a very popular men's gymnastics figure in Bulgarian sports history.

== Awards and honours ==
Competition	1st place, gold medalist(s)	2nd place, silver medalist(s)	3rd place, bronze medalist(s)	Total
Olympic Games	1	0	0	1
World Cup	0	0	2	2
European Cup	0	0	1	1
Balkan Cup	1	0	0	2
Bulgarian Cup	1	0	0	1
Total	4	0	3	7

=== Team Awards ===
(gold) World Championships

- Fourth Place: 1987

(gold) European Championships

- (bronze) Third Place: 1989

Balkan Cup

- First Place: 1986

=== Individual Awards ===
Olympic Games

- First Place: (Pommel Horse) 1988

(gold) World Championships

- (bronze) Third Place: (Pommel Horse) 1987
- (bronze) Third Place: (Floor Exercise) 1987

Balkan Cup

- First Place: 1986

Bulgarian Cup

- First Place: 1985
