= Park Jong-hoon =

South Korean artistic gymnast

- 박종훈
- Alternative name: Park Jong-hun
- Born: 6 May 1965 (age 61)
- Height: 1.66 m (5 ft 5 in)

Gymnastics career
- Discipline: Men's artistic gymnastics
- Country represented: South Korea
Medal record
Men's artistic gymnastics
Representing South Korea
Olympic Games
Bronze medal – third place	1988 Seoul	Vault
Asian Games
Silver medal – second place	1986 Seoul	Team
Silver medal – second place	1986 Seoul	Parallel Bars
Bronze medal – third place	1986 Seoul	Floor Exercise
Bronze medal – third place	1986 Seoul	Vault

Korean name
- Hangul: 박종훈
- Hanja: 朴鍾勛
- RR: Bak Jonghun
- MR: Pak Chonghun

Park Jong-hoon (born 6 May 1965) is a South Korean former gymnast who competed in the 1988 Summer Olympics.

== Education ==
- Korea National Sport University
- Suwon High School for Agricultural Science
