= Jürgen Brümmer =

German gymnast

- Born: 8 December 1964 Stuttgart, West Germany
- Died: 25 February 2014 (aged 49) Ostfildern, Germany

Gymnastics career
- Country represented: West Germany

Jürgen Brümmer (8 December 1964 – 25 February 2014) was a German gymnast and physical therapist.

Brümmer won nine German championship titles. He competed at the 1987 and 1989 World Artistic Gymnastics Championships. In 1987, he also was a competitor at the European Men's Artistic Gymnastics Championships. One year later, Brümmer also competed for West Germany at the Summer Olympics in Seoul.

As a physical therapist, Brümmer served the German junior gymnast team in 1992, and from 1992 to 1994, the handball team of TSV Scharnhausen. From 1996 to 1998, he worked for the soccer team Stuttgarter Kickers.

On the night of 25 February 2014, Brümmer died by suicide at the Körsch Viaduct. Around 3 a.m., his car was found near the viaduct. Shortly afterwards, his 15-year-old son, who had been in need of ongoing care since an accident two years before, was found dead in his home, evidently having been suffocated by Brümmer. Brümmer is survived by his wife and a second son.
