= Deyan Kolev =

Bulgarian gymnast (1965–2013)

Dian Kolev
- Деян Христов Колев
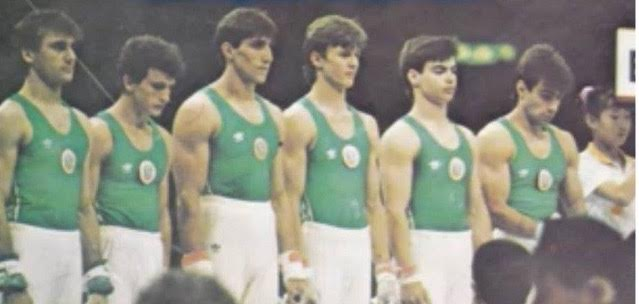
- Kolev, second to the left, with the Bulgarian national team at the 1988 Olympics in Seoul, South Korea

Personal information
- Full name: Dian Hristov Kolev
- Born: 18 December 1965 Targovishte, Bulgaria
- Died: 13 January 2013 (aged 47) Lansing, Michigan, US

Gymnastics career
- Discipline: Men's artistic gymnastics
- Country represented: Bulgaria
Medal record
Representing Bulgaria
World Championships
Bronze medal – third place	1987 Rotterdam	Vault
European Championships
Bronze medal – third place	1989 Stockholm	Team
Balkan Cup
Gold medal – first place	1988 Sofia	Individual
Gold medal – first place	1988 Sofia	Team
Gold medal – first place	1984 Sofia	Team
Gold medal – first place	1980 Sofia	Team
Bulgarian Cup
Gold medal – first place	1984 Sofia	Individual
Gold medal – first place	1983 Sofia	Individual

Deyan Hristov Kolev (Bulgarian: Деян Христов Колев) (18 December 1965 – 13 January 2013) was a Bulgarian gymnast. He competed at the 1988 Summer Olympics and the 1992 Summer Olympics.

== Awards and honours ==
Competition	1st place, gold medalist(s)	2nd place, silver medalist(s)	3rd place, bronze medalist(s)	Total
Olympic Games	0	0	0	0
World Cup	0	0	1	1
European Cup	0	0	1	1
Balkan Cup	4	0	0	4
Bulgarian Cup	2	0	0	2
Total	6	0	2	8

=== Team Awards ===
(gold) World Championships

- Fourth Place: 1987

(gold) European Championships

- (bronze) Third Place: 1989

Balkan Cup

- First Place: 1980, 1984, 1988

=== Individual Awards ===
(gold) World Championships

- (bronze) Third Place: (Vault) 1987

Balkan Cup

- First Place: 1988

Bulgarian Cup

- First Place: 1984, 1983
