= Petar Georgiev (gymnast) =

Bulgarian gymnast (1965–2013)

- Петър Димитров Георгиев
- Full name: Petar Dimitrov Georgiev
- Born: 29 January 1965 Sofia, Bulgaria
- Died: 8 August 2013 (aged 48) Detroit, Michigan, US

Gymnastics career
- Discipline: Men's artistic gymnastics
- Country represented: Bulgaria

Petar Dimitrov Georgiev (Bulgarian: Петър Георгиев) (29 January 1965 – 8 August 2013) was a Bulgarian gymnast. He competed in eight events at the 1988 Summer Olympics. He died in a car accident in 2013.
