= Adrian Sandu =

Romanian gymnast

- Born: 19 October 1966 (age 59) Sibiu, Socialist Republic of Romania
- Height: 1.70 m (5 ft 7 in)

Gymnastics career
- Discipline: Men's artistic gymnastics
- Country represented: Romania

Adrian Sandu (born 19 October 1966) is a Romanian gymnast. He competed at the 1988 Summer Olympics and the 1992 Summer Olympics.
