= Hélder Pinheiro =

Portuguese gymnast (born 1969)

- Born: 25 November 1969 (age 56)
- Height: 1.70 m (5 ft 7 in)

Gymnastics career
- Discipline: Men's artistic gymnastics
- Country represented: Portugal

Hélder Pinheiro (born 25 November 1969) is a Portuguese gymnast. He competed in seven events at the 1988 Summer Olympics.
