= Chang Chao-chun =

Taiwanese gymnast

- 張 照圳
- Alternative name: Pinyin: Zhāng Zhào-zhèn
- Born: 1 December 1966 (age 59)
- Height: 1.65 m (5 ft 5 in)

Gymnastics career
- Discipline: Men's artistic gymnastics
- Country represented: Chinese Taipei

Chang Chao-chun (born 1 December 1966) is a Taiwanese gymnast. He competed in seven events at the 1988 Summer Olympics.
