= Koichi Mizushima =

Japanese artistic gymnast (born 1965)

- 水島 宏一
- Born: 1 August 1965 (age 61) Tsuyama, Okayama, Japan
- Height: 1.62 m (5 ft 4 in)

Gymnastics career
- Discipline: Men's artistic gymnastics
- Country represented: Japan
Medal record
Men's artistic gymnastics
Representing Japan
Olympic Games
Bronze medal – third place	1988 Seoul	Team
Asian Games
Bronze medal – third place	1986 Seoul	Team
Bronze medal – third place	1986 Seoul	Parallel Bars

Koichi Mizushima (水島 宏一, Mizushima Kōichi; born 1 August 1965) is a Japanese former gymnast who competed in the 1988 Summer Olympics.
