= Jenő Paprika =

Hungarian gymnast (born 1960)

- Born: 5 January 1960 (age 66) Kiskunhalas, Hungarian People's Republic
- Height: 1.77 m (5 ft 10 in)

Gymnastics career
- Discipline: Men's artistic gymnastics
- Country represented: Hungary
- Club: Dunaújvárosi Kohász Sportegyesület

Jenő Paprika (born 5 January 1960) is a Hungarian gymnast. He competed in eight events at the 1988 Summer Olympics.
