= Daniel Winkler (gymnast) =

German gymnast

- Born: 17 May 1962 (age 64) Darmstadt, West Germany
- Height: 1.71 m (5 ft 7 in)

Gymnastics career
- Discipline: Men's artistic gymnastics
- Country represented: West Germany
- Gym: Turn- und Sportvereinigung Heusenstamm 1873

Daniel Winkler (born 17 May 1962) is a German gymnast. He competed at the 1984 Summer Olympics and the 1988 Summer Olympics.
