= Song Yu-jin =

South Korean gymnast

- 송유진
- Alternative name: Song Yoo-jin
- Born: 25 January 1967 (age 59)
- Height: 1.65 m (5 ft 5 in)

Gymnastics career
- Discipline: Men's artistic gymnastics
- Country represented: South Korea

Song Yu-jin (born 25 January 1967) is a South Korean gymnast. He competed in seven events at the 1988 Summer Olympics.
