= Wes Suter =

American gymnast

- Full name: Kenneth Wesley Suter
- Born: May 23, 1964 (age 62) Philadelphia, Pennsylvania, U.S.
- Height: 178 cm (5 ft 10 in)

Gymnastics career
- Discipline: Men's artistic gymnastics
- Country represented: United States; (–1989)
- College team: Nebraska Cornhuskers

Kenneth Wesley Suter (born May 23, 1964) is a retired American gymnast. He was a member of the United States men's national artistic gymnastics team and competed in the 1988 Olympics.

Suter was a highly decorated high school gymnast in Virginia in the early 80s. Describing Suter's intensity, his coach Bob Grauman remarked:

I have never in all of my years of coaching, and I coached for 32 years, have never met an individual with fire in the belly to perform at a high level. Whether it was practice, warm-ups or a meet, he had that killer instinct and wanted to win.

Suter went on to compete at the University of Nebraska–Lincoln, where he was part of the 1983 national championship team. In 1985, he was the NCAA all-around champion and also won gold on horizontal bar and floor. Suter was awarded the Nissen Award in 1986 as the country's top gymnast.

Suter's younger brother Richard was also a competitive gymnast.
