= Zsolt Horváth (gymnast) =

Hungarian gymnast (born 1968)

- Born: 18 August 1968 (age 58) Budapest, Hungarian People's Republic
- Height: 1.73 m (5 ft 8 in)
- Spouse: Andrea Ladányi

Gymnastics career
- Discipline: Men's artistic gymnastics
- Country represented: Hungary
- Club: Ferencvárosi Torna Club

Zsolt Horváth (born 18 August 1968) is a Hungarian gymnast. He competed in eight events at the 1988 Summer Olympics.
