= Andreas Aguilar =

German gymnast

- Born: 26 January 1962 (age 64) Barcelona, Spain
- Height: 1.68 m (5 ft 6 in)

Gymnastics career
- Discipline: Men's artistic gymnastics
- Country represented: West Germany
- Club: Turn-Klubb zu Hannover 1858
Medal record
Men's artistic gymnastics
Representing West Germany
World Championships
Gold medal – first place	1989 Stuttgart	Rings
European Championships
Bronze medal – third place	1987 Moscow	Rings
Bronze medal – third place	1989 Stockholm	Rings

Andreas Aguilar (born 26 January 1962) is a German former gymnast who competed in the 1988 Summer Olympics.
