= Marian Rizan =

Romanian artistic gymnast

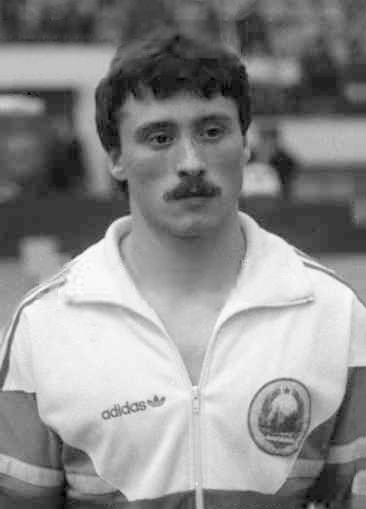
- Rizan in 1988

Personal information
- Born: 29 October 1966 (age 59) Craiova, Socialist Republic of Romania
- Height: 1.63 m (5 ft 4 in)

Gymnastics career
- Discipline: Men's artistic gymnastics
- Country represented: Romania
Medal record
Men's artistic gymnastics
Representing Romania
European Championships
Bronze medal – third place	1987 Moscow	Pommel horse
Bronze medal – third place	1987 Moscow	Parallel bars

Marian Rizan (born 29 October 1966) is a retired Romanian artistic gymnast. He competed at the 1988 and 1992 Olympics with the best individual result of 9th place on the pommel horse in 1988. He placed third in this event at the 1987 European and fourth at the 1989 World Artistic Gymnastics Championships.

Rizan retired from competitions around 1991 to become a gymnastics coach and trained the Romanian national team from 1994 to 1996. After that he worked as a national coach in Denmark.
