= Ulf Hoffmann =

East German gymnast (born 1961)

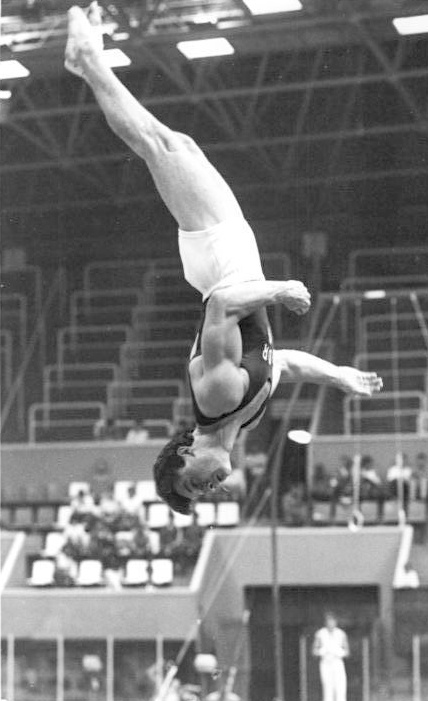
- Hoffmann in 1985

Personal information
- Born: 8 September 1961 (age 65) Neustrelitz, Bezirk Neubrandenburg, East Germany
- Height: 1.66 m (5 ft 5 in)
- Relatives: Lutz Hoffmann (brother)

Gymnastics career
- Discipline: Men's artistic gymnastics
- Country represented: East Germany
- Club: SC Dynamo Berlin
Medal record
Olympic Games
Silver medal – second place	1988 Seoul	Team
Friendship Games
Silver medal – second place	1984 Olomouc	Team
World Championships
Bronze medal – third place	1985 Montreal	Team
Bronze medal – third place	1987 Rotterdam	Team
European Championships
Bronze medal – third place	1985 Oslo	Parallel bars

Ulf Hoffmann (born 8 September 1961) is a retired German gymnast. He missed competing at the 1984 Summer Olympics due to the boycott by East Germany and took part in the Friendship Games instead, winning a silver medal in the team competition. He won an Olympic silver medal with the East German team at the 1988 Summer Olympics. His best individual result at those Games was 13th place on parallel bars. He won three bronze medals at the World Championships in 1985 and 1987 (team) and European Championships in 1985 (parallel bars).After retiring, he moved to Basel, Switzerland, where he coaches female gymnasts.

His elder brother Lutz was also an Olympic gymnast.
