= Kevin Davis (gymnast) =

American gymnast

- Full name: Kevin James Davis
- Born: July 29, 1966 (age 60) Charleston, South Carolina, U.S.
- Height: 170 cm (5 ft 7 in)

Gymnastics career
- Discipline: Men's artistic gymnastics
- Country represented: United States (–1990)
- College team: Nebraska Cornhuskers
Medal record
Men's artistic gymnastics
Representing United States
Event	1st	2nd	3rd
Pan American Games	1	0	0
Total	1	0	0
Pan American Games
Gold medal – first place	1987 Indianapolis	Team

Kevin James Davis (born July 29, 1966) is an American gymnast. He was a member of the United States men's national artistic gymnastics team and competed at the 1988 Summer Olympics where he finished 35th in the individual all around and 11th with the American team in the team final.
