= Gabriele Sala =

Italian gymnast

- Born: 27 September 1967 (age 58) Brescia, Italy
- Height: 1.65 m (5 ft 5 in)

Gymnastics career
- Discipline: Men's artistic gymnastics
- Country represented: Italy

Gabriele Sala (born 27 September 1967 in Brescia, Italy) is an Italian gymnast. He competed at the 1988 Summer Olympics and the 1992 Summer Olympics.
