= Miguel Ángel Rubio (gymnast) =

Spanish gymnast

- Full name: Miguel Ángel Rubio Anguita
- Alternative name: Miquel Àngel Rubio i Anguita
- Born: 20 August 1966 (age 60) Barcelona, Spain
- Height: 1.70 m (5 ft 7 in)

Gymnastics career
- Discipline: Men's artistic gymnastics
- Country represented: Spain
- Club: PMS Cornellà

Miguel Ángel Rubio Anguita (born 20 August 1966) is a Spanish gymnast. He competed at the 1988 Summer Olympics and the 1992 Summer Olympics.
