= Vladimir Gogoladze =

Soviet gymnast (1966–2026)

- ვლადიმერ გოგოლაძე

Personal information
- Alternative name: Vladimir Omarovich Gogoladze
- Nickname: Lado
- Born: 18 August 1966 Tbilisi, Georgian SSR, Soviet Union
- Died: 3 October 2026 (aged 60)
- Height: 1.69 m (5 ft 6 1/2 in)

Gymnastics career
- Discipline: Men's artistic gymnastics
- Country represented: Soviet Union
- Club: Armed Forces (Tbilisi)
Medal record
Olympic Games
Gold medal – first place	1988 Seoul	Team
European Championships
Bronze medal – third place	1985 Oslo	All-Around
Bronze medal – third place	1985 Oslo	Parallel Bars
USSR Championship
Silver medal – second place	1985 USSR Championship	All-Around
Silver medal – second place	1985 USSR Championship	High Bar
Silver medal – second place	1988 USSR Championship	Floor Exercise
Silver medal – second place	1989 USSR Championship	High Bar
Bronze medal – third place	1988 USSR Championship	Pommel Horse
Bronze medal – third place	1988 USSR Championship	Rings

Vladimer "Lado" Omaris dze Gogoladze (Georgian: ვლადიმერ ომარის ძე გოგოლაძე; Russian: Владимир Омарович Гоголадзе, romanized: Vladimir Omarovich Gogoladze; 18 August 1966 – 3 October 2026) was a Georgian gymnast who represented the Soviet Union at the 1988 Olympic Games in Seoul.

== Biography ==
Gogoladze began competing at the elite level in 1985, at the age of 18, taking silver medals in the all-around and high bar in the USSR Championships, and bronze medals at the European Championships in the all-around and parallel bars.

He was a member of the Soviet "Dream Team" who won the team gold at the 1988 Seoul Olympic Games, and he is also known for being the first gymnast to perform a triple back on floor in the Olympics. In the same year, he received the title Honored Master of Sports of the USSR.

According to a report in Sovetsky Sport, Gogoladze and teammate Dmitri Bilozerchev were removed from the Soviet men's squad for the 1989 World Championships because of a two-day drinking binge.

Gogoladze has two elements named after him. The first is a straddled Healy twirl on parallel bars. The second, on floor exercise, is a flair or circle to handstand, then continuing to flair or circle; this element is frequently performed and remains in the current Code of Points.

Gogoladze died on 3 October 2026, at the age of 60. At the time of his death he was coaching at Gymnastics World in Ohio.
