= Ralph Kern =

German gymnast

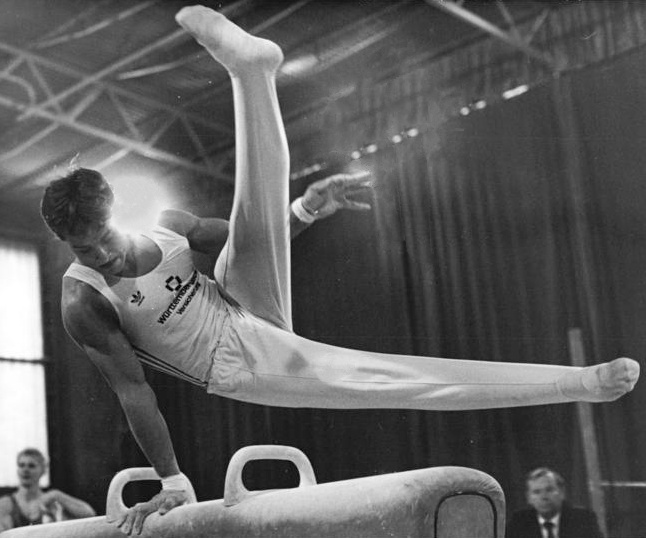
- Kern in 1990

Personal information
- Full name: Ralph-Ingo Kern
- Born: 24 February 1967 (age 59) Heilbronn, West Germany
- Height: 1.71 m (5 ft 7 in)

Gymnastics career
- Discipline: Men's artistic gymnastics
- Country represented: West Germany
- Gym: Sportverein Leingarten 1895

Ralph-Ingo Kern (born 24 February 1967) is a retired German gymnast. He competed at the 1988 Summer Olympics in all artistic gymnastics events and finished in 12th place with the West German team. His best individual result was 33rd place in the vault.
