= Balázs Tóth (gymnast) =

Hungarian gymnast

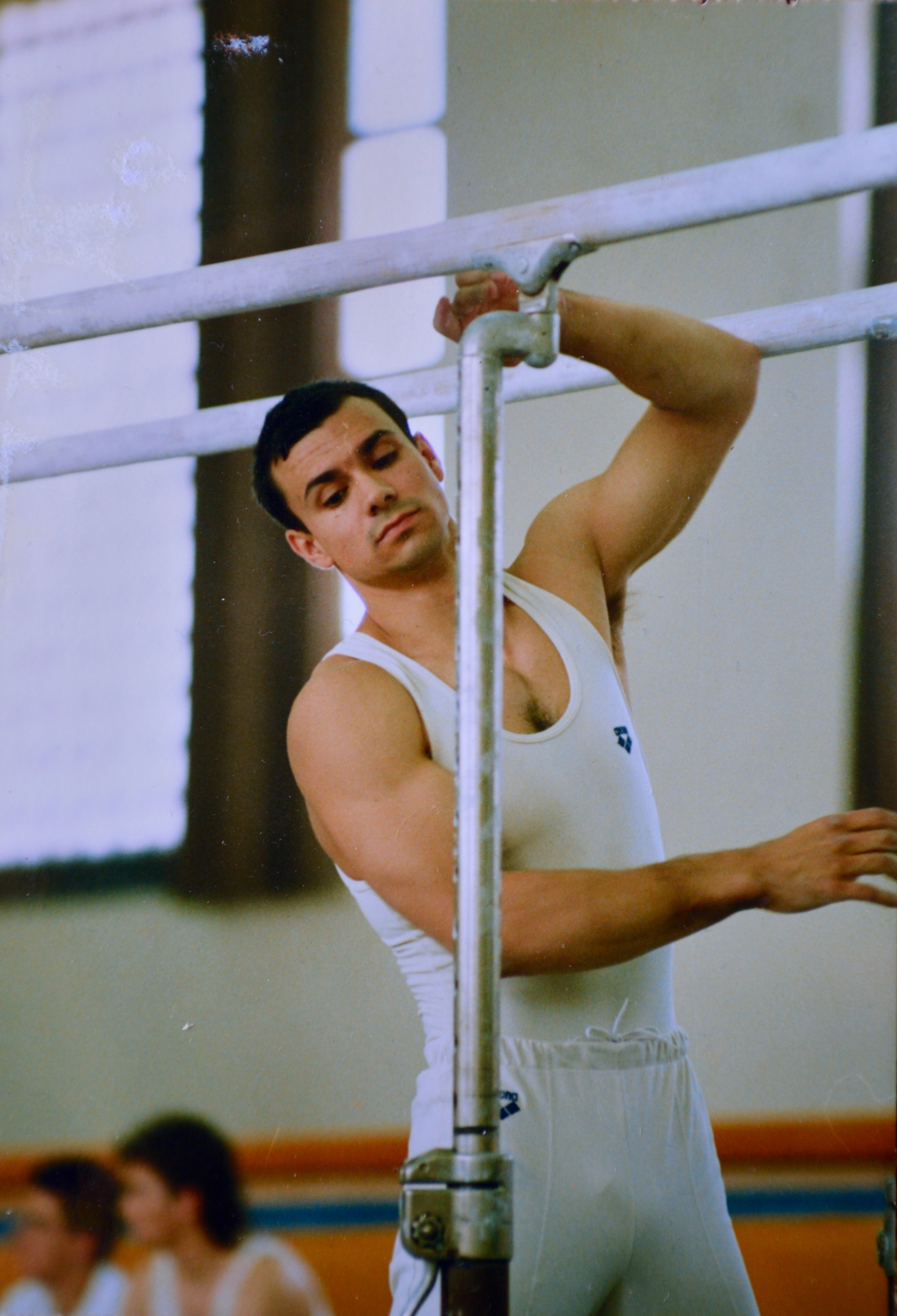
- Tóth in 1989

Personal information
- Born: 6 January 1967 (age 59) Budapest, Hungarian People's Republic
- Height: 1.74 m (5 ft 9 in)

Gymnastics career
- Discipline: Men's artistic gymnastics
- Country represented: Hungary
- Club: Budapesti Honvéd Sportegyesület

Balázs Tóth (born 6 January 1967) is a Hungarian gymnast. He competed in eight events at the 1988 Summer Olympics.
