= Paolo Bucci =

Italian gymnast

- Born: 23 July 1968 (age 58) Milan, Italy
- Height: 1.65 m (5 ft 5 in)

Gymnastics career
- Discipline: Men's artistic gymnastics
- Country represented: Italy
- Gym: Ginnastica Artistica Lissonese

Paolo Bucci (born 23 July 1968) is an Italian gymnast. He competed at the 1988 Summer Olympics, the 1992 Summer Olympics and the 1996 Summer Olympics.
