= Christian Chevalier =

French gymnast

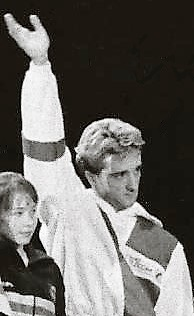
- Chevalier in 1988

Personal information
- Born: 18 December 1966 (age 59) Orthez, France
- Height: 1.65 m (5 ft 5 in)

Gymnastics career
- Discipline: Men's artistic gymnastics
- Country represented: France
- Club: Forbach
Medal record
Men's artistic gymnastics
Representing France
Mediterranean Games
Silver medal – second place	1991 Athens	Team
Silver medal – second place	1991 Athens	Horizontal bar

Christian Chevalier (born 18 December 1966) is a French gymnast. He competed in eight events at the 1988 Summer Olympics.
