= Lance Ringnald =

American gymnast (born 1970)

- Full name: Lance Robert Ringnald
- Born: June 13, 1970 (age 56) Des Moines, Iowa, U.S.
- Height: 170 cm (5 ft 7 in)

Gymnastics career
- Discipline: Men's artistic gymnastics
- Country represented: United States (–1993)
Medal record
Men's artistic gymnastics
Representing United States
Event	1st	2nd	3rd
Goodwill Games	1	1	2
Total	1	1	2
Goodwill Games
Gold medal – first place	1990 Seattle	Horizontal bar
Silver medal – second place	1990 Seattle	Team
Bronze medal – third place	1990 Seattle	All-around
Bronze medal – third place	1990 Seattle	Parallel bars

Lance Robert Ringnald (born June 13, 1970) is a retired American gymnast. He was a member of the United States men's national artistic gymnastics team and participated in the 1988 Olympics. As a 16-year-old, Ringnald moved to Albuquerque, New Mexico to train at a local club, Gold Cup Gymnastics. In 1988, Ringnald, at 18, was the youngest male member of a U.S. Olympics Team since 20 years before. At that competition, Ringnald made the all-around finals, where he placed 35th. In 1989, he was a member of the US men's World Team.

In 1990, at the Goodwill Games, he had one of his best international results, earning a gold medal on the horizontal bar and bronze medals in the all-around and parallel bars. In 1991, he was again a member of the men's World Championships team. That same year, he suffered a torn chest muscle (pectoralis major). One of his few injuries requiring surgery, it happened 10 months before the 1992 Olympics. Ringnald was able to make the 1992 team (as an alternate), which he was grateful for. In 1993, he was again a member of the men's World team, but, later that year, he retired from competition.

Since his retirement, Ringnald has been a cruise ship entertainer, combining gymnastic performance with discussion of his experiences and juggling. He also gives seminars on different methods of memorizing lists, facts, numbers, peoples' names, etc.

== Publications ==
- It's not just gymnastics; it's life: the experiences and insights of Olympic gymnast Lance Ringnald. 2012. By Lance Ringnald and Stacey Lake. ISBN 978-1468151244.
