= Stoyko Gochev =

Bulgarian artistic gymnast

Stoytcho Gotchev
- Стойчо Георгиев Гочев
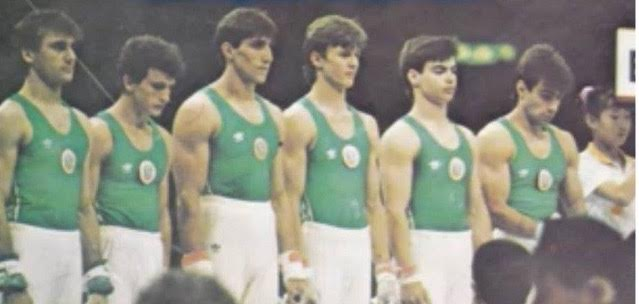
- Gotchev, far right, captaining the Bulgarian national team at the 1988 Olympics in Seoul, South Korea

Personal information
- Full name: Stoytcho Georgievich Gotchev
- Born: 12 January 1965 (age 61) Chirpan, Bulgaria

Gymnastics career
- Discipline: Men's artistic gymnastics
- Country represented: Bulgaria
- Club: Levski Sofia
Medal record
Representing Bulgaria
European Championships
Bronze medal – third place	1989 Stockholm	Team
Friendship Games
Bronze medal – third place	1984 Olomouc	Team
Balkan Cup
Gold medal – first place	1988 Sofia	Individual
Gold medal – first place	1988 Sofia	Team
Gold medal – first place	1984 Sofia	Team
Gold medal – first place	1980 Sofia	Team
Bulgarian Cup
Gold medal – first place	1984 Sofia	Individual
Gold medal – first place	1983 Sofia	Individual
Gold medal – first place	1982 Sofia	Individual

Stoyko Georgiev Gochev (Bulgarian: Стойко Гочев) (born 12 January 1965) was a Bulgarian gymnast. He competed in six events at the 1988 Summer Olympics.

== Awards and honours ==
Competition	1st place, gold medalist(s)	2nd place, silver medalist(s)	3rd place, bronze medalist(s)	Total
Olympic Games	0	0	0	0
World Cup	0	0	0	0
European Cup	0	0	1	1
Friendship Games	0	0	1	1
Balkan Cup	4	0	0	4
Bulgarian Cup	3	0	0	3
Total	7	0	2	9

(Bulgaria) Bulgarian National Team Captain (C)

- World Championships
- Olympic Games
- European Championships
- Friendship Games
- Balkan Cup

=== Team Awards ===
(gold) World Championships

- Fourth Place: 1987

(gold) European Championships

- (bronze) Third Place: 1989

Friendship Games

- Third Place: 1984

Balkan Cup

- First Place: 1980, 1984, 1988

=== Individual Awards ===
Balkan Cup

- First Place: 1988

Bulgarian Cup

- First Place: 1984, 1983, 1982
