= Patrick Mattioni =

French gymnast

- Born: 18 October 1966 (age 60) Paris, France
- Height: 1.78 m (5 ft 10 in)

Gymnastics career
- Discipline: Men's artistic gymnastics
- Country represented: France
- Gym: Epinay/Senart
Medal record
Men's artistic gymnastics
Representing France
Mediterranean Games
Silver medal – second place	1987 Latakia	Vault
Silver medal – second place	1987 Latakia	Parallel bars
Silver medal – second place	1991 Athens	Team
Bronze medal – third place	1987 Latakia	Team

Patrick Mattioni (born 18 October 1966) is a French gymnast. He competed in eight events at the 1988 Summer Olympics.
