= Gil Pinto =

Brazilian gymnast (born 1965)

- Born: 1 December 1965 (age 60) São Paulo, Brazil

Gymnastics career
- Discipline: Men's artistic gymnastics
- Country represented: Brazil

Gil Pinto (born 1 December 1965) is a Brazilian gymnast. He competed in seven events at the 1988 Summer Olympics.
