= Frédéric Longuépée =

French gymnast (born 1965)

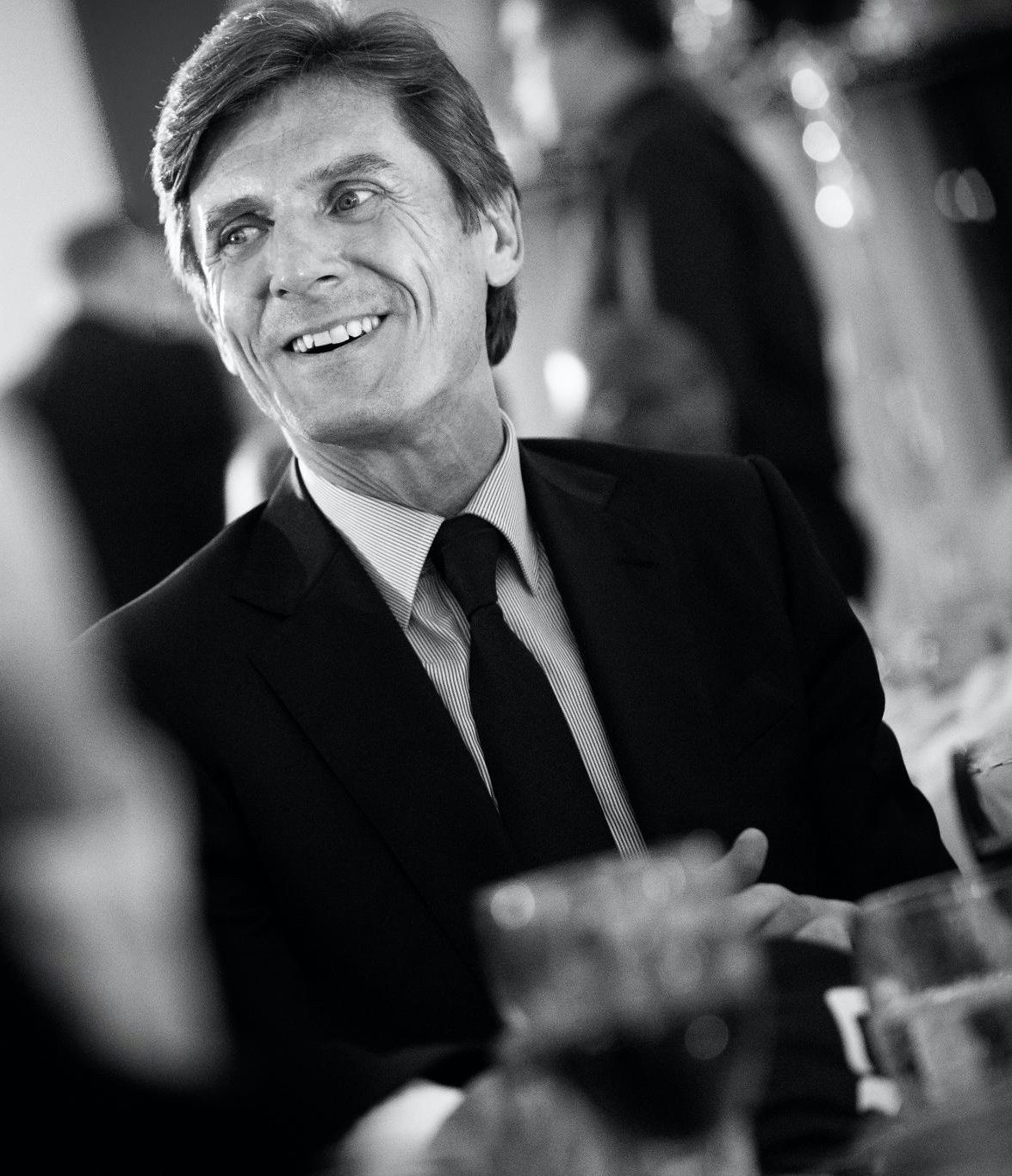
- Longuépée in November 2021

Personal information
- Born: 3 November 1965 (age 60) Lille, France
- Height: 1.80 m (5 ft 11 in)

Gymnastics career
- Discipline: Men's artistic gymnastics
- Country represented: France
- Gym: La Madeleine

Frédéric Longuépée (born 3 November 1965) is a French gymnast and businessman known for his activities in the sport industry, especially in the French football Ligue 1 with Paris Saint-Germain and Girondins de Bordeaux. As a gymnast, Longuépée competed in eight events at the 1988 Summer Olympics.

== Gymnastics career ==
In 1988 he competed in eight events in the French gymnastics team at the 1988 Summer Olympics.

== Post-gymnastics career ==
After retiring as a gymnast, Longuépée pursued a career in sports management. In 2002, as deputy director of the French Tennis Federation, he took charge of the general administration and commercial activities of Roland-Garros, which included ticketing, hospitality operations, and merchandising.

In July 2018, he joined the Paris 2024 Summer Olympics Committee for a few months and took over the commercial and marketing management as marketing Director. The same year, he was appointed President of FC Girondins de Bordeaux.

In July 2021, Longuépée left FC Girondins de Bordeaux following its take-over by a new owner Gérard Lopez.
