= Mike Beckmann =

German gymnast

- Full name: Mikael Beckmann
- Born: 27 October 1967 (age 59) Gevelsberg, West Germany
- Height: 1.70 m (5 ft 7 in)

Gymnastics career
- Discipline: Men's artistic gymnastics
- Country represented: West Germany
- Gym: Verein für Leibesübungen Gevelsberg

Mikael Beckmann (born 27 October 1967) is a German gymnast. He competed at the 1988 Summer Olympics, where he placed twelfth in the team final with the team from West Germany.

== Sports links ==
- Mike Beckmann at Olympedia
