= Claude Carmona =

French gymnast

- Born: 3 January 1964 (age 62) Auch, France
- Height: 1.72 m (5 ft 8 in)

Gymnastics career
- Discipline: Men's artistic gymnastics
- Country represented: France
- Club: OAJLP

Claude Carmona (born 3 January 1964) is a French gymnast. He competed in eight events at the 1988 Summer Olympics.
