= Kenneth Meredith =

Australian gymnast

- Full name: Kenneth John Meredith
- Born: 22 January 1963 (age 63)
- Height: 155 cm (5 ft 1 in)

Gymnastics career
- Discipline: Men's artistic gymnastics
- Country represented: Australia
Medal record
Men's artistic gymnastics
Representing Australia
Commonwealth Games
| Silver medal – second place | 1990 Auckland | Parallel bars |
| Bronze medal – third place | 1990 Auckland | Team |
| Bronze medal – third place | 1990 Auckland | Rings |

Kenneth John Meredith (born 22 January 1963) is an Australian gymnast. He competed in seven events at the 1988 Summer Olympics.
