= Charles Lakes =

American gymnast (born 1964)

- Full name: Charles Lakes
- Born: August 6, 1964 (age 62) St. Louis, Missouri, U.S.
- Height: 172 cm (5 ft 8 in)

Gymnastics career
- Discipline: Men's artistic gymnastics
- Country represented: United States
- College team: Illinois Fighting Illini
Medal record
Men's artistic gymnastics
Representing United States
Event	1st	2nd	3rd
Pan American Games	1	0	0
Total	1	0	0
Pan American Games
Gold medal – first place	1987 Indianapolis	Team

Charles Lakes (born August 6, 1964) is a retired American gymnast. He was a member of the United States men's national artistic gymnastics team and participated in the 1988 Olympics.

== College career ==
Lakes competed for the Illinois Fighting Illini men's gymnastics in college. He minored in Spanish. In 1984, he won the NCAA gold medal for the horizontal bar. He left college in 1986 to concentrate on making the Olympic team in 1988.

== Elite career ==
Lakes was a member of the 1985 and 1987 World Gymnastics Championships U.S. teams.

In 1988, Lakes was criticized by some gymnasts, including Kurt Thomas for not training enough. However, Lakes won gold at Nationals on the floor exercise. At the Olympic Trials, Lakes finished first overall. At the Olympics, he was the highest-ranked American gymnast in the all-around finals and finished 19th.

Lakes took 1989 off and then returned to competition in 1990. He attempted a comeback in 1992 but placed 18th and claimed the final spot in the US Olympic trials that year. He was inducted into the USA Gymnastics Hall of Fame in 2003.

Lakes is a devoted Scientologist. During his Olympic career, he was quoted as crediting L. Ron Hubbard's system of Dianetics for his immense success and health, stating "I am by far the healthiest person on the team," he said. "They (other team members) are actually resentful of me because I don't have to train as long as they do."

== Black athlete ==
Lakes was the first black American gymnast to compete in the Olympics. (Ron Galimore was the first African-American selected for the Olympics, but because of the 1980 boycott, he never competed.)

In the Olympic runup, Lakes told Deseret News that he grew up around whites and idolized a white gymnast, Mitch Gaylord. He said that he had not had racial problems in the sport and that he was not black "in terms of separating myself or black pride", but that he did embrace being a role model for younger minority athletes.

Lakes spoke to NBC in 1988:

I think of myself as a gymnast first. But I am black, and as a result I am a role model and I, I embrace that position. So if I can help other black kids, other minority kids, whatever, get to a level in something like gymnastics where they can have a quality of life, I think that would be great.

That same year, he told JET magazine, "I think Debi Thomas (Olympic skater) was wrong when she said she was not a role model for blacks. Whether she wanted to or not, she is a role model, and people were looking up to her."
