= Nicolae Bejenaru =

Romanian gymnast

- Born: 30 May 1968 (age 58) Bucharest, Socialist Republic of Romania
- Height: 1.63 m (5 ft 4 in)

Gymnastics career
- Discipline: Men's artistic gymnastics
- Country represented: Romania

Nicolae Bejenaru (born 30 May 1968) is a Romanian gymnast. He competed at the 1988 Summer Olympics and the 1992 Summer Olympics.
