= Jože Kolman =

Slovenian gymnast (born 1967)

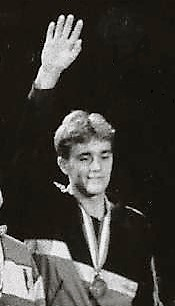
- Kolman in 1988

Personal information
- Born: 5 February 1967 (age 59) Ljubljana, Socialist Federal Republic of Yugoslavia
- Height: 1.71 m (5 ft 7 in)

Gymnastics career
- Discipline: Men's artistic gymnastics
- Country represented: Slovenia
- Former countries represented: Yugoslavia
- Club: Trnovo Ljubljana

Jože Kolman (born 5 February 1967) is a Slovenian gymnast. He competed at the 1988 Summer Olympics and the 1992 Summer Olympics.
