= Riccardo Trapella =

Italian gymnast and magazieniere olon

- Born: 14 February 1968 (age 58) Aarau, Switzerland
- Height: 1.65 m (5 ft 5 in)

Gymnastics career
- Discipline: Men's artistic gymnastics
- Country represented: Italy

Riccardo Trapella (born 14 February 1968) is an Italian gymnast. He competed in eight events at the 1988 Summer Olympics.
