= Takahiro Yamada (gymnast) =

Japanese artistic gymnast

- 山田 隆弘
- Born: 9 June 1964 (age 62) Tokushima Prefecture, Japan
- Height: 1.67 m (5 ft 6 in)

Gymnastics career
- Discipline: Men's artistic gymnastics
- Country represented: Japan
Medal record
Men's artistic gymnastics
Representing Japan
Olympic Games
Bronze medal – third place	1988 Seoul	Team

Takahiro Yamada (山田隆弘, Yamada Takahiro; born 9 June 1964) is a Japanese former gymnast who competed in the 1988 Summer Olympics.
