= Guo Linxian =

Chinese gymnast

- 國 林顯
- Born: 7 September 1965 (age 60)

Gymnastics career
- Discipline: Men's artistic gymnastics
- Country represented: China

Guo Linxian (born 7 September 1965) is a Chinese gymnast. He competed in eight events at the 1988 Summer Olympics.
