= Stéphane Cauterman =

French gymnast

- Born: 26 December 1968 (age 57) Roubaix, France
- Height: 1.72 m (5 ft 8 in)

Gymnastics career
- Discipline: Men's artistic gymnastics
- Country represented: France
- Club: La Madeleine
Medal record
Men's artistic gymnastics
Representing France
Mediterranean Games
Silver medal – second place	1993 Languedoc-Roussillon	Team
Bronze medal – third place	1987 Latakia	Team

Stéphane Cauterman (born 26 December 1968) is a French gymnast. He competed in eight events at the 1988 Summer Olympics.
