= James Rozon =

Canadian gymnast (born 1963)

- Born: 31 December 1963 (age 62) Saskatoon, Saskatchewan, Canada

Gymnastics career
- Discipline: Men's artistic gymnastics
- Country represented: Canada

James Rozon (born 31 December 1963) is a Canadian former gymnast. He competed in eight events at the 1988 Summer Olympics.
