= Csaba Fajkusz =

Hungarian gymnast

- Born: 13 September 1967 (age 58) Győr, Hungarian People's Republic
- Height: 1.67 m (5 ft 6 in)

Gymnastics career
- Discipline: Men's artistic gymnastics
- Country represented: Hungary
- Club: Újpesti Tornaegylet

Csaba Fajkusz (born 13 September 1967) is a Hungarian gymnast. He competed at the 1988 Summer Olympics and the 1992 Summer Olympics.
