= Hiroyuki Konishi (gymnast) =

Japanese artistic gymnast

- 小西 裕之
- Born: 14 August 1963 (age 63) Tokyo, Japan
- Height: 1.67 m (5 ft 6 in)

Gymnastics career
- Discipline: Men's artistic gymnastics
- Country represented: Japan
Medal record
Men's artistic gymnastics
Representing Japan
Olympic Games
Bronze medal – third place	1988 Seoul	Team
Asian Games
Bronze medal – third place	1986 Seoul	Team

Hiroyuki Konishi (小西 裕之, Konishi Hiroyuki; born 14 August 1963) is a Japanese former gymnast who competed in the 1988 Summer Olympics.
