= Wang Chongsheng =

Chinese gymnast

- 王崇升
- Born: 22 September 1966 (age 59) Qiongshan, Haikou, China

Gymnastics career
- Discipline: Men's artistic gymnastics
- Country represented: China
Medal record
Representing China
Asian Games
Gold medal – first place	1986 Seoul	Team

Wang Chongsheng (Chinese: 王崇升; born 22 September 1966) is a Chinese gymnast. He competed in eight events at the 1988 Summer Olympics.
