= Álvaro Montesinos =

Spanish gymnast (born 1963)

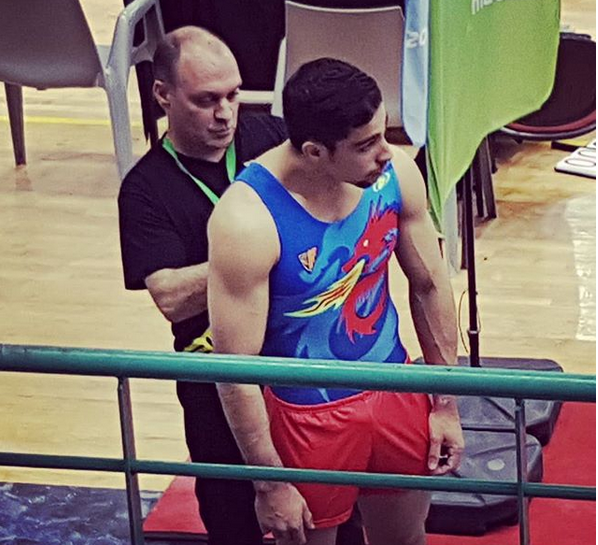
- Montesinos (left) in 2018

Personal information
- Full name: Álvaro Montesinos Yago
- Born: 24 September 1963 (age 62) Torrent, Spain
- Height: 1.64 m (5 ft 5 in)

Gymnastics career
- Discipline: Men's artistic gymnastics
- Country represented: Spain

Álvaro Montesinos Yago (born 24 September 1963) is a Spanish gymnast. He competed in seven events at the 1988 Summer Olympics.
