= Lorne Bobkin =

Canadian gymnast

- Born: 30 January 1965 (age 61) Toronto, Canada

Gymnastics career
- Discipline: Men's artistic gymnastics
- Country represented: Canada

Lorne Bobkin (born 30 January 1965) is a Canadian gymnast. He competed in eight events at the 1988 Summer Olympics.
