= Dominick Minicucci =

American gymnast (born 1969)

- Full name: Dominick Minicucci Jr.
- Born: January 10, 1969 (age 57) Staten Island, New York, U.S.
- Height: 167 cm (5 ft 6 in)

Gymnastics career
- Discipline: Men's artistic gymnastics
- Country represented: United States
- College team: Temple Owls; Illinois Fighting Illini
Medal record
Men's artistic gymnastics
Representing United States
Event	1st	2nd	3rd
Pan American Games	1	1	1
Total	1	1	1
Pan American Games
Gold medal – first place	1991 Havana	Parallel bars
Silver medal – second place	1991 Havana	Team
Bronze medal – third place	1991 Havana	Pommel horse

Dominick Minicucci Jr. (born January 10, 1969) is an American gymnast. He was a member of the United States men's national artistic gymnastics team and competed at the 1988 Summer Olympics and the 1992 Summer Olympics.

Minicucci won several gold medals representing New York City in gymnastics at the Empire State Games. However, due to a scheduling conflict, he was unable to compete in the qualifiers for the 1983 edition and instead qualified as a member of New York City's team handball squad.
