= Alan Nolet =

Canadian gymnast (born 1967)

- Full name: Alan Pierre Nolet
- Born: 17 December 1967 (age 58) Toronto, Ontario, Canada

Gymnastics career
- Discipline: Men's artistic gymnastics
- Country represented: Canada

Alan Pierre Nolet (born 17 December 1967) is a Canadian gymnast. He competed at the 1988 Summer Olympics, the 1992 Summer Olympics and the 1996 Summer Olympics.
