= Vladimir Novikov (gymnast) =

Soviet artistic gymnast

- Владимир Анатольевич Новиков
- Full name: Vladimir Anatolyevich Novikov
- Born: 4 August 1970 (age 56) Alma-Ata, Kazakh SSR, Soviet Union
- Height: 1.61 m (5 ft 3 in)

Gymnastics career
- Discipline: Men's artistic gymnastics
- Country represented: Soviet Union
- Club: Dynamo Alma-Ata
- Head coach: Vladimir Yakovlevich Ufimtsev
Medal record
Men's artistic gymnastics
Representing Soviet Union
Olympic Games
Gold medal – first place	1988 Seoul	Team
World Championships
Gold medal – first place	1987 Rotterdam	Team
Gold medal – first place	1989 Stuttgart	Team

Vladimir Anatolyevich Novikov (Владимир Анатольевич Новиков, born 4 August 1970 in Alma Ata, Kazakh SSR) is a retired Soviet gymnast. He competed at the 1988 Summer Olympics in all artistic gymnastics events and won a gold medal with the Soviet team. Individually his best result was sixth place on the parallel bars. He won two more gold medals with the Soviet team at the world championships in 1987 and 1989.

After retirement from competitions he coached gymnastics at the Woodward Gymnastics Camp in the United States, together with Vitaly Shcherbo.
