= Thierry Pecqueux =

French gymnast

- Born: 12 January 1965 (age 61) Nevers, France
- Height: 1.68 m (5 ft 6 in)

Gymnastics career
- Discipline: Men's artistic gymnastics
- Country represented: France
- Gym: ASA Vauzelles
Medal record
Men's artistic gymnastics
Representing France
Mediterranean Games
Bronze medal – third place	1987 Latakia	Team
Bronze medal – third place	1987 Latakia	Pommel horse

Thierry Pecqueux (born 12 January 1965) is a French gymnast. He competed in eight events at the 1988 Summer Olympics.
