= Boris Preti =

Italian gymnast

- Born: 6 February 1968 (age 58) Gallarate, Italy
- Height: 1.68 m (5 ft 6 in)

Gymnastics career
- Discipline: Men's artistic gymnastics
- Country represented: Italy
- Gym: Virtus Gallarate

Boris Preti (born 6 February 1968) is an Italian gymnast. He competed at the 1988 Summer Olympics, the 1992 Summer Olympics and the 1996 Summer Olympics.
