= Kalofer Khristozov =

Bulgarian gymnast (born 1969)

- Калофер Петров Христозов
- Full name: Kalofer Petrov Hristozov
- Born: 19 March 1969 (age 57) Plovdiv, Bulgaria

Gymnastics career
- Discipline: Men's artistic gymnastics
- Country represented: Bulgaria
Medal record
Representing Bulgaria
European Championships
Gold medal – first place	1989 Stockholm	Parallel bars
Bronze medal – third place	1989 Stockholm	Pommel horse
Bronze medal – third place	1990 Lausanne	Parallel bars

Kalofer Petrov Hristozov (Bulgarian: Калофер Христозов) (born 19 March 1969) is a Bulgarian gymnast. He competed at the 1988 Summer Olympics, the 1992 Summer Olympics and the 1996 Summer Olympics.
