= Dimitar Taskov =

Bulgarian gymnast (born 1967)

- Димитър Крумов Тасков
- Full name: Dimitar Krumov Taskov
- Born: 9 June 1967 (age 59) Bansko, Bulgaria

Gymnastics career
- Discipline: Men's artistic gymnastics
- Country represented: Bulgaria

Dimitar Krumov Taskov (Bulgarian: Димитър Крумов Тасков) (born 9 June 1967) is a Bulgarian gymnast. He competed at the 1988 Summer Olympics where he placed 20th in the individual all around and 5th with the Bulgarian team in the team final.
