= Sepp Zellweger =

Swiss gymnast

- Full name: Josef Robert Zellweger
- Born: 19 September 1963 (age 62)
- Height: 1.59 m (5 ft 3 in)

Gymnastics career
- Discipline: Men's artistic gymnastics
- Country represented: Switzerland

Josef Robert "Sepp" Zellweger (born 19 September 1963) is a Swiss gymnast. He competed at the 1984 Summer Olympics and the 1988 Summer Olympics.
