= Gymnastics at the 1984 Summer Olympics – Men's pommel horse =

Olympic gymnastics event

Men's pommel horse at the Games of the XXIII Olympiad
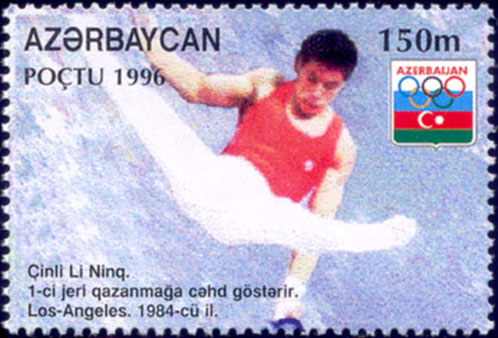
- Azerbaijan stamp depicting Li Ning on the pommel horse at the 1984 Olympics
- Venue: Pauley Pavilion
- Dates: 29 July – 4 August 1984
- Competitors: 71 from 19 nations
- Winning score: 19.950

Medalists
1st place, gold medalist(s)		Li Ning; China
1st place, gold medalist(s)		Peter Vidmar; United States
3rd place, bronze medalist(s)		Tim Daggett; United States

The men's pommel horse competition was one of eight events for male competitors in artistic gymnastics at the 1984 Summer Olympics in Los Angeles. The qualification and final rounds took place on July 29, 31 and August 4 at UCLA’s Pauley Pavilion. There were 71 competitors from 19 nations, with nations competing in the team event having 6 gymnasts while other nations could have to up to 3 gymnasts. The event was won in a tie between Li Ning of China, in the nation's debut in the Games, and Peter Vidmar, with the United States' first gold medal in the pommel horse since 1904 (and second overall) and first medal in the event since 1932. The bronze medal went to another American, Tim Daggett. The Soviet Union's eight-Games podium streak in the event ended with no Soviets competing due to the boycott.

== Background ==
This was the 16th appearance of the event, which is one of the five apparatus events held every time there were apparatus events at the Summer Olympics (no apparatus events were held in 1900, 1908, 1912, or 1920). None of the six finalists from 1980 returned, as all were from boycotting nations. With the absence of the Soviets, East Germans, and Hungary's Zoltán Magyar (who had retired anyway), the field was open to the traditional power Japan and rising powers China and the United States. Li Xiaoping and Li Ning of China had taken second and fourth, respectively, at the 1983 world championships, the highest rankings of the non-boycotting nations; Li Xiaoping had won the world championship in 1981.

The People's Republic of China and San Marino each made their debut in the men's pommel horse. The United States made its 14th appearance, breaking a tie with the absent Hungary for most of any nation; the Americans had missed only the inaugural 1896 pommel horse and the boycotted 1980 Games.

== Competition format ==
Each nation entered a team of six gymnasts or up to three individual gymnasts. All entrants in the gymnastics competitions performed both a compulsory exercise and a voluntary exercise for each apparatus. The scores for all 12 exercises were summed to give an individual all-around score. These exercise scores were also used for qualification for the apparatus finals. The two exercises (compulsory and voluntary) for each apparatus were summed to give an apparatus score.

The 1984 Games expanded the number of finalists from six to eight. Nations were still limited to two finalists each. Others were ranked 9th through 71st. Half of the preliminary score carried over to the final.

== Schedule ==
All times are Pacific Daylight Time (UTC-7)

Date	Time	Round
Sunday, 29 July 1984		Preliminary: Compulsory
Tuesday, 31 July 1984		Preliminary: Voluntary
Saturday, 4 August 1984	17:30	Final

== Results ==
Seventy-one gymnasts competed in the compulsory and optional rounds on July 29 and 31. The eight highest scoring gymnasts advanced to the final on August 4. Each country was limited to two competitors in the final. Half of the points earned by each gymnast during both the compulsory and optional rounds carried over to the final. This constitutes the "prelim" score.

Rank	Gymnast	Nation	Preliminary			Final		
Rank	Gymnast	Nation	Compulsory	Voluntary	Total	1/2 Prelim.	Final	Total
1st place, gold medalist(s)	Li Ning	China	10.00	9.90	19.90	9.950	10.000	19.950
1st place, gold medalist(s)	Peter Vidmar	United States	10.00	9.90	19.90	9.950	10.000	19.950
3rd place, bronze medalist(s)	Tim Daggett	United States	9.95	9.90	19.85	9.925	9.900	19.825
4	Tong Fei	China	9.85	9.85	19.70	9.850	9.900	19.750
5	Jean-Luc Cairon	France	9.75	9.85	19.60	9.800	9.900	19.700
6	Nobuyuki Kajitani	Japan	9.60	9.85	19.45	9.725	9.900	19.625
7	Benno Groß	West Germany	9.75	9.80	19.55	9.775	9.750	19.525
8	Josef Zellweger	Switzerland	9.70	9.80	19.50	9.750	9.750	19.500
9	Mitchell Gaylord	United States	9.90	9.85	19.75	Did not advance		
10	Bart Conner	United States	9.80	9.75	19.55	Did not advance		
11	Jim Hartung	United States	9.80	9.70	19.50	Did not advance		
11	Xu Zhiqiang	China	9.75	9.75	19.50	Did not advance		
13	Brad Peters	Canada	9.75	9.70	19.45	Did not advance		
13	Joël Suty	France	9.70	9.75	19.45	Did not advance		
15	Jürgen Geiger	West Germany	9.65	9.75	19.40	Did not advance		
15	Noritoshi Hirata	Japan	9.60	9.80	19.40	Did not advance		
17	Scott Johnson	United States	9.70	9.65	19.35	Did not advance		
17	Li Xiaoping	China	10.00	9.35	19.35	Did not advance		
19	Tony Piñeda	Mexico	9.50	9.80	19.30	Did not advance		
20	Bernhard Simmelbauer	West Germany	9.65	9.65	19.30	Did not advance		
21	Koji Gushiken	Japan	9.80	9.45	19.25	Did not advance		
22	Markus Lehmann	Switzerland	9.60	9.60	19.20	Did not advance		
22	Li Yuejiu	China	9.60	9.60	19.20	Did not advance		
24	Vittorio Allievi	Italy	9.65	9.50	19.15	Did not advance		
24	Andrew Morris	Great Britain	9.55	9.60	19.15	Did not advance		
24	Emilian Nicula	Romania	9.55	9.60	19.15	Did not advance		
27	Jacques Def	France	9.50	9.60	19.10	Did not advance		
27	Marco Piatti	Switzerland	9.60	9.50	19.10	Did not advance		
27	Daniel Winkler	West Germany	9.40	9.70	19.10	Did not advance		
30	Han Chung-sik	South Korea	9.35	9.70	19.05	Did not advance		
30	Warren Long	Canada	9.50	9.55	19.05	Did not advance		
30	Valentin Pîntea	Romania	9.55	9.50	19.05	Did not advance		
30	Daniel Wunderlin	Switzerland	9.55	9.50	19.05	Did not advance		
34	Shinji Morisue	Japan	9.40	9.60	19.00	Did not advance		
34	Maurizio Zonzini	San Marino	9.45	9.55	19.00	Did not advance		
36	Andreas Japtok	West Germany	9.45	9.50	18.95	Did not advance		
36	Miguel Soler	Spain	9.45	9.50	18.95	Did not advance		
38	Werner Birnbaum	Australia	9.60	9.30	18.90	Did not advance		
38	Johan Jonasson	Sweden	9.30	9.60	18.90	Did not advance		
38	Lee Jeoung-sik	South Korea	9.40	9.50	18.90	Did not advance		
41	Philippe Chartrand	Canada	9.45	9.40	18.85	Did not advance		
41	Alfonso Rodríguez	Spain	9.45	9.40	18.85	Did not advance		
43	Finn Gjertsen	Norway	9.30	9.50	18.80	Did not advance		
43	Jang Tae-eun	South Korea	9.20	9.60	18.80	Did not advance		
43	Keith Langley	Great Britain	9.40	9.40	18.80	Did not advance		
43	Lou Yun	China	9.20	9.60	18.80	Did not advance		
43	Koji Sotomura	Japan	9.55	9.25	18.80	Did not advance		
48	Bruno Cavelti	Switzerland	9.35	9.40	18.75	Did not advance		
48	Nam Seung-gu	South Korea	9.25	9.50	18.75	Did not advance		
48	Barry Winch	Great Britain	9.45	9.30	18.75	Did not advance		
51	Rocco Amboni	Italy	9.30	9.40	18.70	Did not advance		
51	Michel Boutard	France	9.55	9.15	18.70	Did not advance		
51	Ju Yeong-sam	South Korea	9.50	9.20	18.70	Did not advance		
54	Urs Meister	Switzerland	9.45	9.20	18.65	Did not advance		
54	Volker Rohrwick	West Germany	9.35	9.30	18.65	Did not advance		
54	Philippe Vatuone	France	9.45	9.20	18.65	Did not advance		
57	Terence Bartlett	Great Britain	9.45	9.15	18.60	Did not advance		
58	Daniel Gaudet	Canada	9.45	9.10	18.55	Did not advance		
58	Frank Nutzenberger	Canada	9.30	9.25	18.55	Did not advance		
60	Antonio Fraguas	Spain	9.40	9.10	18.50	Did not advance		
61	Chae Gwang-seok	South Korea	9.00	9.45	18.45	Did not advance		
62	Diego Lazzarich	Italy	8.95	9.45	18.40	Did not advance		
63	Laurent Barbiéri	France	9.20	9.05	18.25	Did not advance		
64	Yohanan Moyal	Israel	8.85	9.25	18.10	Did not advance		
65	Kyoji Yamawaki	Japan	8.65	9.40	18.05	Did not advance		
66	Allan Reddon	Canada	9.60	8.20	17.80	Did not advance		
67	Richard Benyon	Great Britain	8.25	9.35	17.60	Did not advance		
68	Gerson Gnoatto	Brazil	8.05	9.35	17.40	Did not advance		
69	Eddie Van Hoof	Great Britain	8.70	8.55	17.25	Did not advance		
70	Robert Edmonds	Australia	9.45	7.60	17.05	Did not advance		
71	Ya'akov Levi	Israel	8.60	8.25	16.85	Did not advance		
