= Gymnastics at the 1984 Summer Olympics – Men's artistic individual all-around =

Olympic gymnastics event

Men's artistic individual all-around at the Games of the XXIII Olympiad
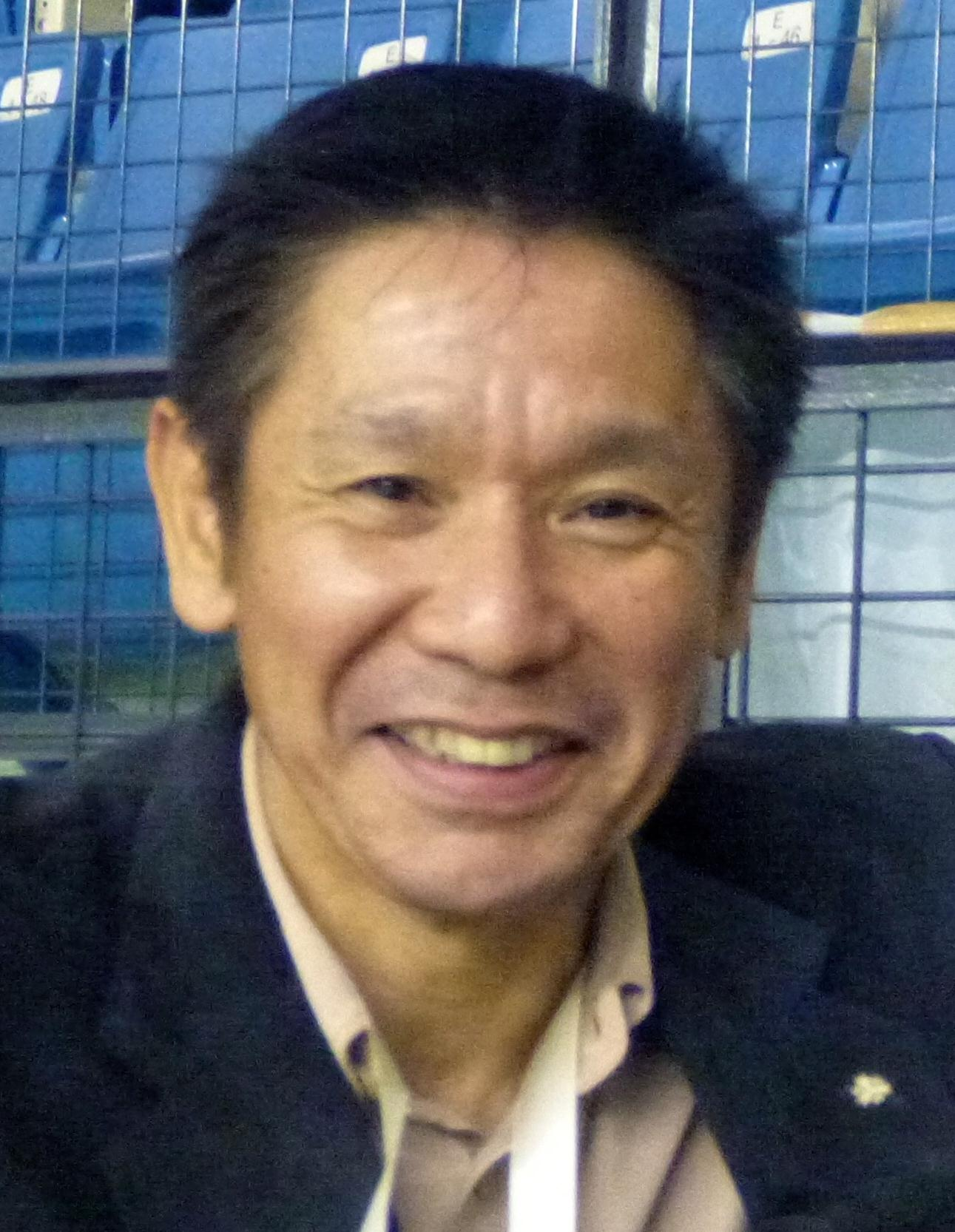
- Gold medalist Kōji Gushiken (2011)
- Venue: Pauley Pavilion
- Dates: 29 July – 2 August 1984
- Competitors: 71 from 19 nations
- Winning score: 118.700

Medalists
1st place, gold medalist(s)		Kōji Gushiken; Japan
2nd place, silver medalist(s)		Peter Vidmar; United States
3rd place, bronze medalist(s)		Li Ning; China

The men's individual all-around competition was one of eight events for male competitors in artistic gymnastics at the 1984 Summer Olympics in Los Angeles. The qualification and final rounds took place on July 29, 31 and August 2 at UCLA's Pauley Pavilion. There were 71 competitors from 19 nations. Each nation could send a team of 6 gymnasts or up to 3 individual gymnasts. The event was won by Kōji Gushiken of Japan, the nation's fourth victory in the event (tying Italy for second-most at the time, behind the Soviet Union's five). The United States won its first medal in the event since the 1904 Games in St. Louis with Peter Vidmar's silver. China, making its debut in the event, received bronze with Li Ning finishing third.

== Background ==
This was the 19th appearance of the men's individual all-around. The first individual all-around competition had been held in 1900, after the 1896 competitions featured only individual apparatus events. A men's individual all-around has been held every Games since 1900.

None of the top 10 gymnasts from the 1980 Games returned; 9 of the 10 were from nations that boycotted the 1984 Games, while Dan Grecu of Romania had retired after being injured in 1980 (his fourth Games). The highest-ranked finisher from Moscow to return was 20th-place finisher Michel Boutard of France. The Soviets, absent from Los Angeles, had taken four of the seven medals at the two World Championships since Moscow; Kōji Gushiken of Japan had taken two of the rest (bronze in 1981, silver in 1983) and Lou Yun had shared bronze in 1983 for the last one.

The People's Republic of China and San Marino each made their debut in the event. France made its 17th appearance, most among nations.

== Competition format ==
The competition format followed the preliminary and final format introduced in 1972, with the limit on the number of finalists per nation added in 1976. All entrants in the gymnastics competitions performed both a compulsory exercise and a voluntary exercise for each apparatus. The scores for all 12 exercises were summed to give an individual all-around preliminary score. Half of the scores from the preliminary carried over to the final, with the top 36 gymnasts advancing to the individual all-around final—except that each nation was limited to 3 finalists. There, each of the finalists performed another exercise on each apparatus. The sum of these scores plus half of the preliminary score resulted in a final total.

Each exercise was scored from 0 to 10; thus, the preliminary apparatus scores ranged from 0 to 20 each and the total preliminary score from 0 to 120. With half of the preliminary score and six more exercises scored 0 to 10, the final total was also from 0 to 120.

The preliminary exercise scores were also used for qualification for the apparatus finals.

== Schedule ==
All times are Pacific Daylight Time (UTC-7)

Date	Time	Round
Sunday, 29 July 1984	9:30; 14:00; 18:30	Preliminary: Compulsory
Tuesday, 31 July 1984	9:30; 14:00; 18:30	Preliminary: Voluntary
Thursday, 2 August 1984	17:30	Final

== Results ==
Seventy-one gymnasts competed in the compulsory and optional rounds on July 29 and 31. The thirty-six highest scoring gymnasts advanced to the final on August 2. Each country was limited to three competitors in the final. Half of the points earned by each gymnast during both the compulsory and optional rounds carried over to the final. This constitutes each gymnast's "prelim" score.

Rank	Gymnast	Nation	Prelim	1/2 Prelim	Floor	Pommel horse	Rings	Vault	Parallel bars	Horizontal bar	Final	Total
1st place, gold medalist(s)	Koji Gushiken	Japan	118.20	59.100	9.900	9.900	9.950	10.000	9.900	9.950	59.600	118.700
2nd place, silver medalist(s)	Peter Vidmar	United States	118.55	59.275	9.800	9.900	9.900	9.900	9.900	10.000	59.400	118.675
3rd place, bronze medalist(s)	Li Ning	China	118.45	59.225	9.900	9.950	9.900	9.900	9.800	9.900	59.350	118.575
4	Tong Fei	China	118.40	59.200	9.900	9.900	9.900	9.900	9.750	10.000	59.350	118.550
5	Mitchell Gaylord	United States	118.15	59.075	9.850	9.900	9.950	9.900	9.900	9.950	59.450	118.525
6	Bart Conner	United States	118.30	59.150	9.850	9.900	9.900	9.800	9.850	9.900	59.200	118.350
7	Xu Zhiqiang	China	118.15	59.075	9.900	9.900	9.900	9.900	9.900	9.650	59.150	118.225
8	Nobuyuki Kajitani	Japan	116.95	58.475	9.750	9.900	9.900	9.900	9.900	9.550	58.900	117.375
9	Noritoshi Hirata	Japan	116.80	58.400	9.850	9.700	9.900	9.800	9.650	9.900	58.800	117.200
10	Jürgen Geiger	West Germany	116.75	58.375	9.700	9.600	9.900	9.900	9.450	9.750	58.300	116.675
11	Josef Zellweger	Switzerland	116.40	58.200	9.700	9.800	9.800	9.700	9.550	9.800	58.350	116.550
12	Markus Lehmann	Switzerland	116.30	58.150	9.700	9.750	9.600	9.650	9.550	9.800	58.050	116.200
13	Jang Tae-eun	South Korea	115.30	57.650	9.850	9.550	9.800	9.850	9.750	9.700	58.500	116.150
14	Emilian Nicula	Romania	115.65	57.825	9.500	9.650	9.900	9.750	9.550	9.850	58.200	116.025
15	Valentin Pîntea	Romania	116.10	58.050	9.900	9.800	9.350	9.700	9.400	9.800	57.950	116.000
15	Jean-Luc Cairon	France	116.10	58.050	9.800	9.800	9.900	9.800	9.400	9.250	57.950	116.000
17	Andreas Japtok	West Germany	116.20	58.100	9.600	9.700	9.800	9.700	9.550	9.400	57.750	115.850
18	Philippe Chartrand	Canada	115.75	57.875	9.450	9.500	9.900	9.800	9.200	9.950	57.800	115.675
19	Warren Long	Canada	115.05	57.525	9.800	9.600	9.800	9.750	9.450	9.700	58.100	115.625
20	Joel Suty	France	115.50	57.750	9.650	9.800	9.700	9.750	9.600	9.250	57.750	115.500
21	Daniel Winkler	West Germany	116.40	58.200	8.900	9.650	9.750	9.800	9.650	9.300	57.050	115.250
22	Philippe Vatuone	France	115.45	57.725	9.850	9.100	9.800	9.700	9.050	9.800	57.300	115.025
23	Tony Piñeda	Mexico	114.50	57.250	9.700	9.850	9.500	9.700	9.500	9.450	57.700	114.950
24	Andrew Morris	Great Britain	114.40	57.200	9.650	9.600	9.800	9.700	9.600	9.350	57.700	114.900
25	Miguel Soler	Spain	114.40	57.200	9.600	9.650	9.800	9.750	9.150	9.700	57.650	114.850
26	Vittorio Allievi	Italy	113.95	56.975	9.750	9.700	9.550	9.900	9.450	9.550	57.850	114.825
27	Han Chung-sik	South Korea	115.05	57.525	9.450	8.850	9.800	9.850	9.650	9.550	57.150	114.675
28	Daniel Wunderlin	Switzerland	116.10	58.050	9.800	8.750	9.800	9.750	9.600	8.800	56.500	114.550
28	Lee Jeong-sik	South Korea	114.70	57.350	9.750	9.650	9.750	9.700	9.300	9.050	57.200	114.550
30	Rocco Amboni	Italy	113.40	56.700	9.600	9.650	9.750	9.750	9.200	9.700	57.650	114.350
31	Werner Birnbaum	Australia	114.60	57.300	9.750	9.000	9.700	9.700	9.100	9.550	56.800	114.100
32	Diego Lazzarich	Italy	113.80	56.900	9.800	8.800	9.700	9.800	9.250	9.550	56.900	113.800
33	Daniel Gaudet	Canada	114.60	57.300	9.700	8.650	9.900	9.550	9.300	9.150	56.250	113.550
34	Keith Langley	Great Britain	114.10	57.050	9.750	9.250	9.700	9.300	8.550	9.750	56.300	113.350
35	Antonio Fraguas	Spain	113.25	56.625	9.700	8.900	9.800	9.700	9.200	9.400	56.700	113.325
36	Terence Bartlett	Great Britain	114.95	57.475	0.000	0.000	0.000	9.550	9.350	0.000	18.900	76.375
37	Tim Daggett	United States	117.85	Did not advance—3 per nation rule								
38	Jim Hartung	United States	117.75	Did not advance—3 per nation rule								
39	Lou Yun	China	117.65	Did not advance—3 per nation rule								
40	Li Xiaoping	China	116.85	Did not advance—3 per nation rule								
41	Li Yuejiu	China	116.70	Did not advance—3 per nation rule								
42	Scott Johnson	United States	116.60	Did not advance—3 per nation rule								
42	Shinji Morisue	Japan	116.60	Did not advance—3 per nation rule								
44	Koji Sotomura	Japan	116.05	Did not advance—3 per nation rule								
44	Benno Groß	West Germany	116.05	Did not advance—3 per nation rule								
46	Marco Piatti	Switzerland	115.95	Did not advance—3 per nation rule								
47	Kyoji Yamawaki	Japan	115.65	Did not advance—3 per nation rule								
48	Volker Rohrwick	West Germany	115.45	Did not advance—3 per nation rule								
49	Laurent Barbiéri	France	115.30	Did not advance—3 per nation rule								
50	Bernhard Simmelbauer	West Germany	115.25	Did not advance—3 per nation rule								
51	Brad Peters	Canada	115.15	Did not advance—3 per nation rule								
52	Jacques Def	France	114.85	Did not advance—3 per nation rule								
53	Bruno Cavelti	Switzerland	114.60	Did not advance—3 per nation rule								
54	Frank Nutzenberger	Canada	114.30	Did not advance—3 per nation rule								
55	Allan Reddon	Canada	114.05	Did not advance—3 per nation rule								
56	Ju Yeong-sam	South Korea	113.95	Did not advance—3 per nation rule								
57	Barry Winch	Great Britain	113.90	Did not advance—3 per nation rule								
58	Nam Seung-gu	South Korea	113.75	Did not advance—3 per nation rule								
59	Chae Gwang-seok	South Korea	113.50	Did not advance—3 per nation rule								
60	Michel Boutard	France	113.25	Did not advance								
60	Urs Meister	Switzerland	113.25	Did not advance								
62	Alfonso Rodríguez	Spain	112.75	Did not advance								
63	Finn Gjertsen	Norway	112.35	Did not advance								
64	Carl Beynon	Great Britain	111.85	Did not advance								
65	Maurizio Zonzini	San Marino	111.65	Did not advance								
66	Johan Jonasson	Sweden	111.55	Did not advance								
67	Yohanan Moyal	Israel	110.80	Did not advance								
68	Rob Edmonds	Australia	110.45	Did not advance								
69	Eddie Van Hoof	Great Britain	110.25	Did not advance								
70	Gerson Gnoatto	Brazil	108.05	Did not advance								
71	Ya'akov Levi	Israel	106.15	Did not advance								
