= Gymnastics at the 1984 Summer Olympics – Men's vault =

Olympic gymnastics event

Men's vault at the Games of the XXIII Olympiad
- Artistic gymnastics pictogram
- Venue: Pauley Pavilion
- Dates: 29 July – 4 August 1984
- Competitors: 71 from 19 nations
- Winning score: 19.950

Medalists
1st place, gold medalist(s)		Lou Yun; China
2nd place, silver medalist(s)		Mitchell Gaylord; United States
2nd place, silver medalist(s)		Koji Gushiken; Japan
2nd place, silver medalist(s)		Li Ning; China
2nd place, silver medalist(s)		Shinji Morisue; Japan

The men's vault competition was one of eight events for male competitors in artistic gymnastics at the 1984 Summer Olympics in Los Angeles. The qualification and final rounds took place on July 29, 31 and August 4 at UCLA’s Pauley Pavilion. There were 71 competitors from 19 nations, with nations competing in the team event having 6 gymnasts while other nations could have to up to 3 gymnasts. The event was won by Lou Yun of China, in the nation's debut in the Games.

With four silver medalists, the event produced the only four-way tie in the Olympics to date. The silver medals went to Li Ning of China, Koji Gushiken and Shinji Morisue of Japan, and Mitchell Gaylord of the United States. Gaylord's medal was the first for the United States in the vault since 1932.

== Background ==
This was the 16th appearance of the event, which is one of the five apparatus events held every time there were apparatus events at the Summer Olympics (no apparatus events were held in 1900, 1908, 1912, or 1920). None of the six finalists from 1980 returned, as all were from boycotting nations. With the absence of the dominant Soviets and strong East Germans, the field was open to the traditional power Japan and rising powers China and the United States. Li Ning and Lou Yun of China had taken second and fourth, respectively, at the 1983 world championships, the highest rankings of the non-boycotting nations.

The People's Republic of China and San Marino each made their debut in the men's vault. The United States made its 14th appearance, breaking a tie with the absent Hungary for most of any nation; the Americans had missed only the inaugural 1896 vault and the boycotted 1980 Games.

== Competition format ==
The event used a "vaulting horse" aligned parallel to the gymnast's run (rather than the modern "vaulting table" in use since 2004). Each nation entered a team of six gymnasts or up to three individual gymnasts. All entrants in the gymnastics competitions performed both a compulsory exercise and a voluntary exercise for each apparatus. The scores for all 12 exercises were summed to give an individual all-around score. These exercise scores were also used for qualification for the apparatus finals. The two exercises (compulsory and voluntary) for each apparatus were summed to give an apparatus score.

The 1984 Games expanded the number of finalists from six to eight. Nations were still limited to two finalists each. Others were ranked 9th through 71st. Half of the preliminary score carried over to the final.

== Schedule ==
All times are Pacific Daylight Time (UTC-7)

Date	Time	Round
Sunday, 29 July 1984		Preliminary: Compulsory
Tuesday, 31 July 1984		Preliminary: Voluntary
Saturday, 4 August 1984	17:30	Final

== Results ==
Seventy-one gymnasts competed in the compulsory and optional rounds on July 29 and 31st. The eight highest scoring gymnasts advanced to the final on August 4. Each country was limited to two competitors in the final. Half of the points earned by each gymnast during both the compulsory and optional rounds carried over to the final. This constitutes the "prelim" score.

Rank	Gymnast	Nation	Preliminary			Final		
Rank	Gymnast	Nation	Compulsory	Voluntary	Total	1/2 Prelim.	Final	Total
1st place, gold medalist(s)	Lou Yun	China	10.00	10.00	20.00	10.000	9.950	19.950
2nd place, silver medalist(s)	Mitchell Gaylord	United States	9.95	9.90	19.85	9.925	9.900	19.825
2nd place, silver medalist(s)	Koji Gushiken	Japan	9.85	9.90	19.75	9.875	9.950	19.825
2nd place, silver medalist(s)	Li Ning	China	10.00	9.75	19.75	9.875	9.950	19.825
2nd place, silver medalist(s)	Shinji Morisue	Japan	9.95	9.75	19.70	9.850	9.975	19.825
6	Jim Hartung	United States	9.90	9.90	19.80	9.900	9.900	19.800
7	Warren Long	Canada	9.85	9.85	19.70	9.850	9.850	19.700
8	Daniel Wunderlin	Switzerland	9.90	9.80	19.70	9.850	9.775	19.625
9	Scott Johnson	United States	9.85	9.85	19.70	Did not advance		
10	Terence Bartlett	Great Britain	9.90	9.75	19.65	Did not advance		
10	Bart Conner	United States	9.80	9.85	19.65	Did not advance		
10	Valentin Pîntea	Romania	9.90	9.75	19.65	Did not advance		
10	Tong Fei	China	9.85	9.80	19.65	Did not advance		
10	Peter Vidmar	United States	9.80	9.85	19.65	Did not advance		
10	Xu Zhiqiang	China	9.80	9.85	19.65	Did not advance		
16	Laurent Barbiéri	France	9.85	9.75	19.60	Did not advance		
16	Nobuyuki Kajitani	Japan	9.70	9.90	19.60	Did not advance		
16	Li Yuejiu	China	9.75	9.85	19.60	Did not advance		
16	Andrew Morris	Great Britain	9.85	9.75	19.60	Did not advance		
16	Marco Piatti	Switzerland	9.80	9.80	19.60	Did not advance		
16	Allan Reddon	Canada	9.85	9.75	19.60	Did not advance		
16	Volker Rohrwick	West Germany	9.90	9.70	19.60	Did not advance		
16	Philippe Vatuone	France	9.80	9.80	19.60	Did not advance		
16	Kyoji Yamawaki	Japan	9.85	9.75	19.60	Did not advance		
25	Werner Birnbaum	Australia	9.90	9.65	19.55	Did not advance		
25	Jean-Luc Cairon	France	9.80	9.75	19.55	Did not advance		
25	Robert Edmonds	Australia	9.85	9.70	19.55	Did not advance		
25	Jürgen Geiger	West Germany	9.90	9.65	19.55	Did not advance		
25	Benno Groß	West Germany	9.80	9.75	19.55	Did not advance		
25	Li Xiaoping	China	9.75	9.80	19.55	Did not advance		
25	Koji Sotomura	Japan	9.75	9.80	19.55	Did not advance		
32	Vittorio Allievi	Italy	9.75	9.75	19.50	Did not advance		
32	Tim Daggett	United States	9.70	9.80	19.50	Did not advance		
32	Noritoshi Hirata	Japan	9.70	9.80	19.50	Did not advance		
32	Andreas Japtok	West Germany	9.80	9.70	19.50	Did not advance		
32	Markus Lehmann	Switzerland	9.80	9.70	19.50	Did not advance		
32	Joël Suty	France	9.80	9.70	19.50	Did not advance		
32	Barry Winch	Great Britain	9.85	9.65	19.50	Did not advance		
32	Josef Zellweger	Switzerland	9.80	9.70	19.50	Did not advance		
40	Rocco Amboni	Italy	9.90	9.55	19.45	Did not advance		
40	Philippe Chartrand	Canada	9.75	9.70	19.45	Did not advance		
40	Han Chung-sik	South Korea	0.80	9.65	10.45	Did not advance		
40	Brad Peters	Canada	9.75	9.70	19.45	Did not advance		
40	Bernhard Simmelbauer	West Germany	9.80	9.65	19.45	Did not advance		
40	Miguel Soler	Spain	9.75	9.70	19.45	Did not advance		
40	Daniel Winkler	West Germany	9.75	9.70	19.45	Did not advance		
47	Jang Tae-eun	South Korea	9.70	9.70	19.40	Did not advance		
47	Antonio Fraguas	Spain	9.75	9.65	19.40	Did not advance		
47	Diego Lazzarich	Italy	9.80	9.60	19.40	Did not advance		
47	Urs Meister	Switzerland	9.80	9.60	19.40	Did not advance		
47	Emilian Nicula	Romania	9.80	9.60	19.40	Did not advance		
47	Alfonso Rodríguez	Spain	9.70	9.70	19.40	Did not advance		
53	Finn Gjertsen	Norway	9.80	9.55	19.35	Did not advance		
53	Keith Langley	Great Britain	9.75	9.60	19.35	Did not advance		
53	Lee Jeoung-sik	South Korea	9.70	9.65	19.35	Did not advance		
56	Michel Boutard	France	9.65	9.65	19.30	Did not advance		
56	Jacques Def	France	9.65	9.65	19.30	Did not advance		
56	Nam Seung-gu	South Korea	9.70	9.60	19.30	Did not advance		
56	Frank Nutzenberger	Canada	9.70	9.60	19.30	Did not advance		
56	Tony Piñeda	Mexico	9.55	9.75	19.30	Did not advance		
56	Eddie Van Hoof	Great Britain	9.70	9.60	19.30	Did not advance		
62	Chae Gwang-seok	South Korea	9.70	9.55	19.25	Did not advance		
63	Daniel Gaudet	Canada	9.65	9.55	19.20	Did not advance		
63	Ju Yeong-sam	South Korea	9.65	9.55	19.20	Did not advance		
63	Maurizio Zonzini	San Marino	9.40	9.80	19.20	Did not advance		
66	Richard Benyon	Great Britain	9.65	9.50	19.15	Did not advance		
66	Johan Jonasson	Sweden	9.50	9.65	19.15	Did not advance		
68	Ya'akov Levi	Israel	9.60	9.50	19.10	Did not advance		
68	Yohanan Moyal	Israel	9.50	9.60	19.10	Did not advance		
70	Bruno Cavelti	Switzerland	9.70	9.25	18.95	Did not advance		
70	Gerson Gnoatto	Brazil	9.30	9.65	18.95	Did not advance		
