= Gymnastics at the 1984 Summer Olympics – Men's horizontal bar =

Men's horizontal bar at the Games of the XXIII Olympiad
- Artistic gymnastics pictogram
- Venue: Pauley Pavilion
- Dates: 29 July – 4 August 1984
- Competitors: 71 from 19 nations
- Winning score: 20.000

Medalists
1st place, gold medalist(s)		Shinji Morisue; Japan
2nd place, silver medalist(s)		Tong Fei; China
3rd place, bronze medalist(s)		Koji Gushiken; Japan

The men's horizontal bar competition was one of eight events for male competitors in artistic gymnastics at the 1984 Summer Olympics in Los Angeles. The qualification and final rounds took place on July 29, 31 and August 4 at UCLA’s Pauley Pavilion. There were 71 competitors from 19 nations, with nations competing in the team event having 6 gymnasts while other nations could have to up to 3 gymnasts. The event was won by Shinji Morisue of Japan, continuing the nation's dominant streak where it left off before the 1980 boycott. Morisue scored a perfect 20 in the event (requiring all three exercises to receive perfect 10s); he was one of only three gymnasts to achieve a perfect 20 on an apparatus (and the only male gymnast to do so) during the 20-point era (1952–1988). The gold medal was Japan's sixth on the horizontal bar, all within eight Games (including one in which Japan did not compete at all). Koji Gushiken added a bronze medal for Japan. The People's Republic of China debuted strongly, with a silver medal from Tong Fei.

== Background ==
This was the 16th appearance of the event, which is one of the five apparatus events held every time there were apparatus events at the Summer Olympics (no apparatus events were held in 1900, 1908, 1912, or 1920). None of the six finalists from 1980 returned; all six were from boycotting nations. Soviets had won the last two world championships (and shared silver at both, as well); France's Philippe Vatuone had tied for second in 1983, with Shinji Morisue of Japan and Tong Fei of China even in fourth place. The host nation's hopes were in Peter Vidmar, a world championship finalist.

The People's Republic of China and San Marino each made their debut in the men's horizontal bar. The United States made its 14th appearance, breaking a tie with the absent Hungary for most of any nation; the Americans had missed only the inaugural 1896 event and the boycotted 1980 Games.

== Competition format ==
Each nation entered a team of six gymnasts or up to three individual gymnasts. All entrants in the gymnastics competitions performed both a compulsory exercise and a voluntary exercise for each apparatus. The scores for all 12 exercises were summed to give an individual all-around score. These exercise scores were also used for qualification for the apparatus finals. The two exercises (compulsory and voluntary) for each apparatus were summed to give an apparatus score.

The 1984 Games expanded the number of finalists from six to eight. Nations were still limited to two finalists each. Others were ranked 9th through 71st. Half of the preliminary score carried over to the final.

== Schedule ==
All times are Pacific Daylight Time (UTC-7)

Date	Time	Round
Sunday, 29 July 1984		Preliminary: Compulsory
Tuesday, 31 July 1984		Preliminary: Voluntary
Saturday, 4 August 1984	17:30	Final

== Results ==
Seventy-one gymnasts competed in the compulsory and optional rounds on July 29 and 31. The eight highest scoring gymnasts advanced to the final on August 4. Each country was limited to two competitors in the final. Half of the points earned by each gymnast during both the compulsory and optional rounds carried over to the final. This constitutes the "prelim" score.

Rank	Gymnast	Nation	Preliminary			Final		
Rank	Gymnast	Nation	Compulsory	Voluntary	Total	1/2 Prelim.	Final	Total
1st place, gold medalist(s)	Shinji Morisue	Japan	10.00	10.00	20.00	10.000	10.000	20.000
2nd place, silver medalist(s)	Tong Fei	China	10.00	9.95	19.95	9.975	10.000	19.975
3rd place, bronze medalist(s)	Kōji Gushiken	Japan	10.00	9.90	19.90	9.950	10.000	19.950
4	Lou Yun	China	9.95	9.95	19.90	9.950	9.900	19.850
4	Peter Vidmar	United States	9.95	9.95	19.90	9.950	9.900	19.850
4	Tim Daggett	United States	9.90	10.00	19.90	9.950	9.900	19.850
7	Marco Piatti	Switzerland	9.90	9.90	19.80	9.900	9.900	19.800
8	Daniel Wunderlin	Switzerland	9.85	9.90	19.75	9.875	9.800	19.675
9	Xu Zhiqiang	China	10.00	9.90	19.90	Did not advance		
10	Bart Conner	United States	9.90	9.90	19.80	Did not advance		
11	Li Yuejiu	China	9.85	9.90	19.75	Did not advance		
12	Philippe Chartrand	Canada	9.80	9.90	19.70	Did not advance		
12	Noritoshi Hirata	Japan	9.80	9.90	19.70	Did not advance		
12	Lee Jeoung-sik	South Korea	9.85	9.85	19.70	Did not advance		
12	Philippe Vatuone	France	9.85	9.85	19.70	Did not advance		
16	Bruno Cavelti	Switzerland	9.80	9.85	19.65	Did not advance		
16	Jacques Def	France	9.80	9.85	19.65	Did not advance		
16	Andreas Japtok	West Germany	9.75	9.90	19.65	Did not advance		
16	Li Xiaoping	China	9.70	9.95	19.65	Did not advance		
20	Jim Hartung	United States	9.80	9.80	19.60	Did not advance		
20	Markus Lehmann	Switzerland	9.80	9.80	19.60	Did not advance		
22	Chae Gwang-seok	South Korea	9.75	9.80	19.55	Did not advance		
22	Antonio Fraguas	Spain	9.80	9.75	19.55	Did not advance		
22	Daniel Winkler	West Germany	9.75	9.80	19.55	Did not advance		
25	Jang Tae-eun	South Korea	9.75	9.75	19.50	Did not advance		
25	Keith Langley	Great Britain	9.70	9.80	19.50	Did not advance		
25	Frank Nutzenberger	Canada	9.80	9.70	19.50	Did not advance		
25	Koji Sotomura	Japan	9.75	9.75	19.50	Did not advance		
25	Joël Suty	France	9.70	9.80	19.50	Did not advance		
30	Laurent Barbiéri	France	9.65	9.80	19.45	Did not advance		
30	Diego Lazzarich	Italy	9.65	9.80	19.45	Did not advance		
30	Josef Zellweger	Switzerland	9.65	9.80	19.45	Did not advance		
30	Han Chung-sik	South Korea	9.85	9.60	19.45	Did not advance		
34	Jürgen Geiger	West Germany	9.70	9.70	19.40	Did not advance		
34	Li Ning	China	9.50	9.90	19.40	Did not advance		
34	Nam Seung-gu	South Korea	9.65	9.75	19.40	Did not advance		
37	Terence Bartlett	Great Britain	9.75	9.60	19.35	Did not advance		
37	Mitchell Gaylord	United States	9.40	9.95	19.35	Did not advance		
37	Ju Yeong-sam	South Korea	9.65	9.70	19.35	Did not advance		
37	Nobuyuki Kajitani	Japan	9.90	9.45	19.35	Did not advance		
41	Tony Piñeda	Mexico	9.55	9.75	19.30	Did not advance		
41	Jean-Luc Cairon	France	9.60	9.70	19.30	Did not advance		
41	Benno Groß	West Germany	9.60	9.70	19.30	Did not advance		
41	Valentin Pîntea	Romania	9.60	9.70	19.30	Did not advance		
45	Urs Meister	Switzerland	9.55	9.70	19.25	Did not advance		
45	Allan Reddon	Canada	9.75	9.50	19.25	Did not advance		
45	Kyoji Yamawaki	Japan	9.70	9.55	19.25	Did not advance		
48	Bernhard Simmelbauer	West Germany	9.65	9.55	19.20	Did not advance		
48	Daniel Gaudet	Canada	9.60	9.60	19.20	Did not advance		
48	Barry Winch	Great Britain	9.60	9.60	19.20	Did not advance		
51	Scott Johnson	United States	9.65	9.50	19.15	Did not advance		
51	Emilian Nicula	Romania	9.85	9.30	19.15	Did not advance		
51	Brad Peters	Canada	9.80	9.35	19.15	Did not advance		
51	Volker Rohrwick	West Germany	9.60	9.55	19.15	Did not advance		
51	Miguel Soler	Spain	9.45	9.70	19.15	Did not advance		
56	Werner Birnbaum	Australia	9.70	9.40	19.10	Did not advance		
56	Warren Long	Canada	9.60	9.50	19.10	Did not advance		
58	Rocco Amboni	Italy	9.65	9.40	19.05	Did not advance		
58	Eddie Van Hoof	Great Britain	9.55	9.50	19.05	Did not advance		
60	Alfonso Rodríguez	Spain	9.70	9.30	19.00	Did not advance		
61	Vittorio Allievi	Italy	9.70	9.20	18.90	Did not advance		
61	Richard Benyon	Great Britain	9.45	9.45	18.90	Did not advance		
61	Michel Boutard	France	9.50	9.40	18.90	Did not advance		
64	Finn Gjertsen	Norway	9.55	9.20	18.75	Did not advance		
65	Yohanan Moyal	Israel	9.15	9.50	18.65	Did not advance		
66	Andrew Morris	Great Britain	9.75	8.70	18.45	Did not advance		
67	Rob Edmonds	Australia	9.75	8.35	18.10	Did not advance		
68	Maurizio Zonzini	San Marino	9.25	8.80	18.05	Did not advance		
68	Gerson Gnoatto	Brazil	8.45	9.60	18.05	Did not advance		
70	Johan Jonasson	Sweden	8.00	9.65	17.65	Did not advance		
70	Ya'akov Levi	Israel	9.10	8.55	17.65	Did not advance		
