= Gymnastics at the 1984 Summer Olympics – Men's rings =

Olympic gymnastics event

Men's rings at the Games of the XXIII Olympiad
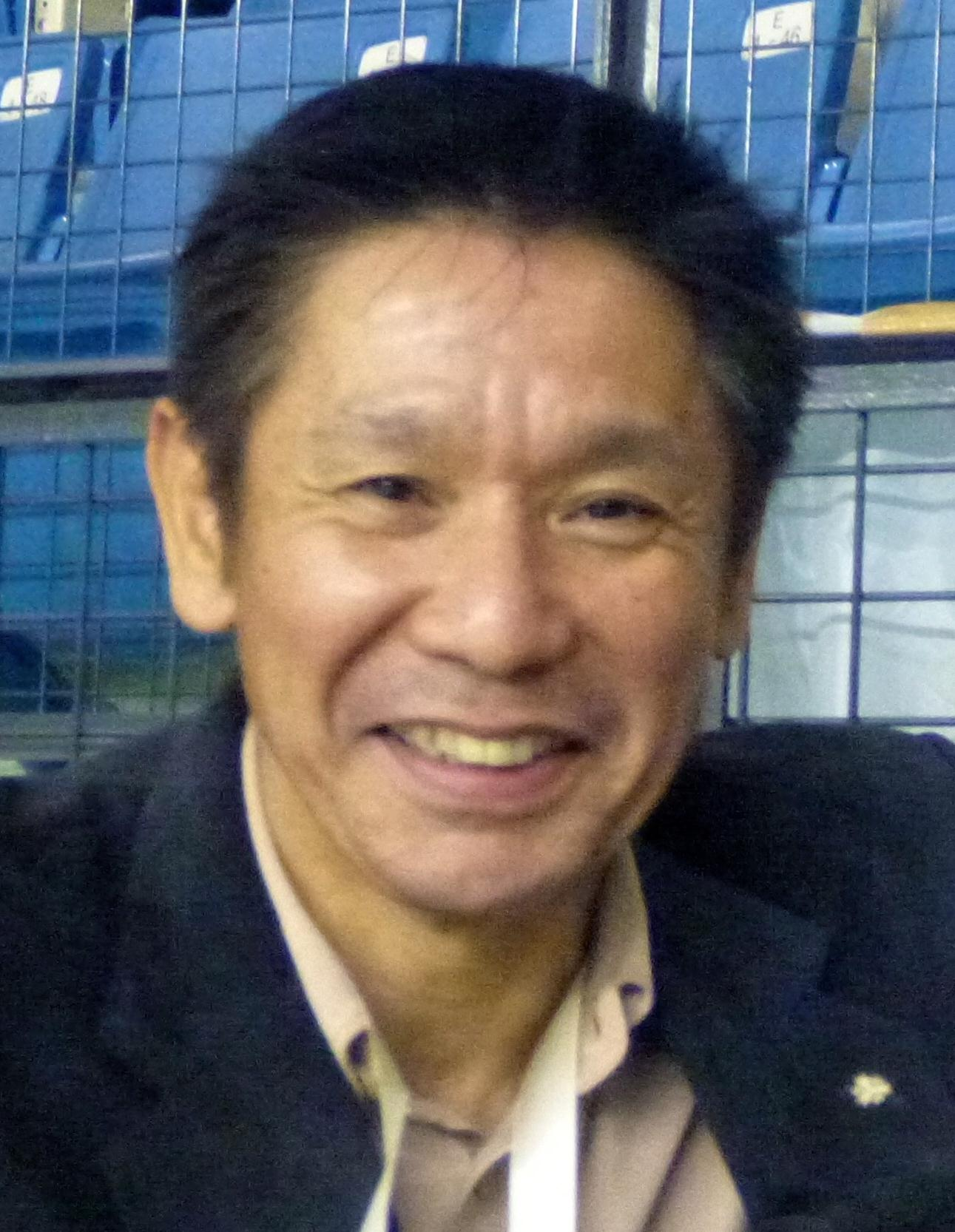
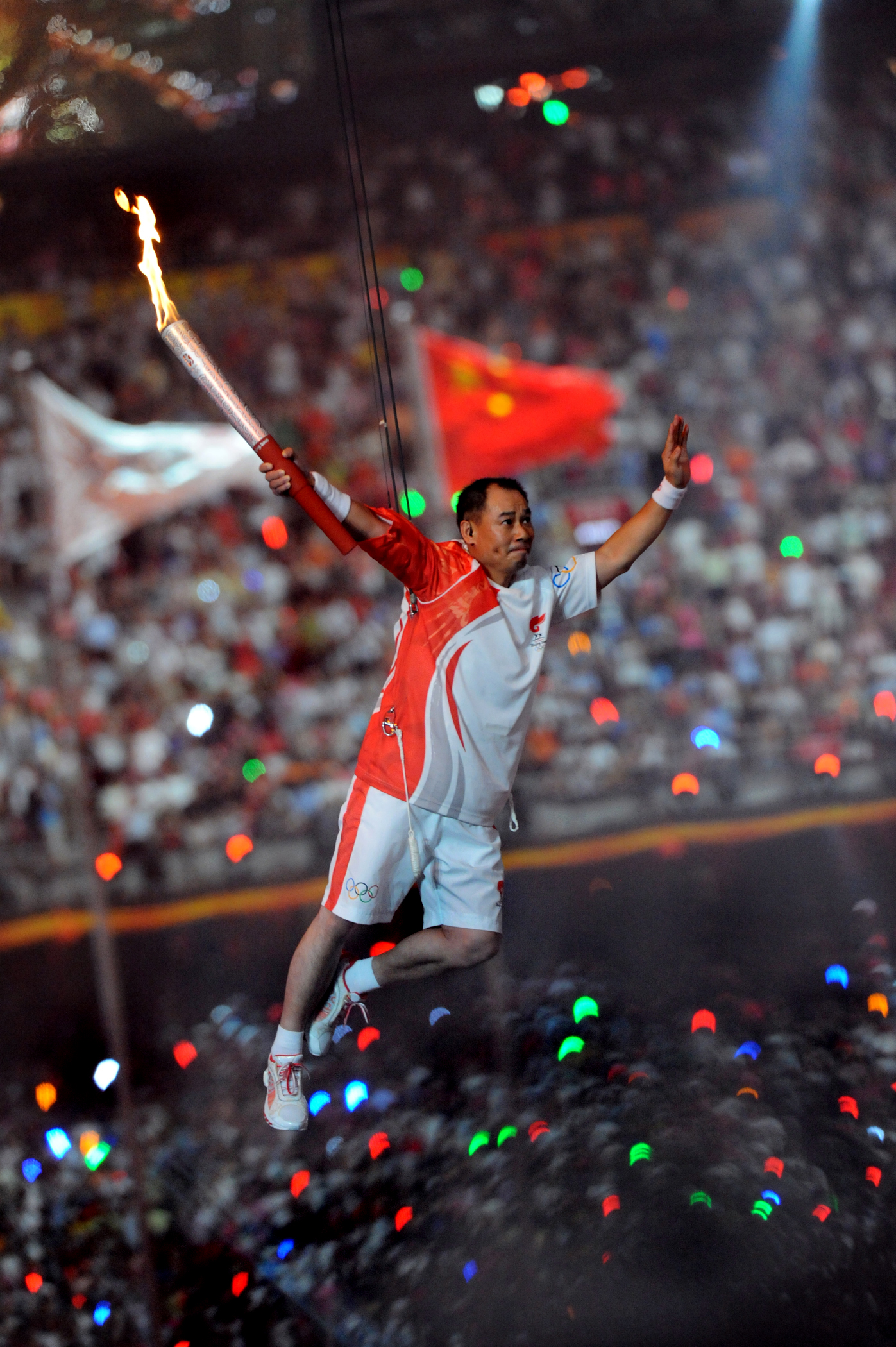
- Koji Gushiken (2011) Li Ning (2008)
- Venue: Pauley Pavilion
- Dates: 29 July – 4 August
- Competitors: 71 from 19 nations
- Winning score: 19.850

Medalists
1st place, gold medalist(s)		Koji Gushiken; Japan
1st place, gold medalist(s)		Li Ning; China
2nd place, silver medalist(s)		not awarded
3rd place, bronze medalist(s)		Mitchell Gaylord; United States

The men's rings competition was one of eight events for male competitors in artistic gymnastics at the 1984 Summer Olympics in Los Angeles. The qualification and final rounds took place on July 29, 31 and August 4 at UCLA’s Pauley Pavilion. There were 71 competitors from 19 nations, with nations competing in the team event having 6 gymnasts while other nations could have to up to 3 gymnasts. The event was won in a tie between Li Ning of China, in the nation's debut in the Games, and Koji Gushiken, with Japan's first gold medal in the rings since 1972 (and fourth overall). The bronze medal went to American Mitchell Gaylord, the nation's first medal in the event since 1932. The Soviet Union's eight-Games podium streak in the event ended with no Soviets competing due to the boycott.

== Background ==
This was the 16th appearance of the event, which is one of the five apparatus events held every time there were apparatus events at the Summer Olympics (no apparatus events were held in 1900, 1908, 1912, or 1920). None of the six finalists from 1980 returned; five of the six were from boycotting nations, while the other (Dan Grecu of Romania) had retired after suffering a muscle tear during the 1980 final. With the absence of the Soviets, the field was open to the traditional power Japan and rising powers China and the United States. Japan's Koji Gushiken had tied Soviet Dmitry Bilozerchev for the 1983 world championship, with Li Ning of China third.

The People's Republic of China and San Marino each made their debut in the men's rings. The United States made its 14th appearance, breaking a tie with the absent Hungary for most of any nation; the Americans had missed only the inaugural 1896 rings and the boycotted 1980 Games.

== Competition format ==
Each nation entered a team of six gymnasts or up to three individual gymnasts. All entrants in the gymnastics competitions performed both a compulsory exercise and a voluntary exercise for each apparatus. The scores for all 12 exercises were summed to give an individual all-around score. These exercise scores were also used for qualification for the apparatus finals. The two exercises (compulsory and voluntary) for each apparatus were summed to give an apparatus score.

The 1984 Games expanded the number of finalists from six to eight. Nations were still limited to two finalists each. Others were ranked 9th through 71st. Half of the preliminary score carried over to the final.

== Schedule ==
All times are Pacific Daylight Time (UTC-7)

Date	Time	Round
Sunday, 29 July 1984		Preliminary: Compulsory
Tuesday, 31 July 1984		Preliminary: Voluntary
Saturday, 4 August 1984	17:30	Final

== Results ==
Seventy-one gymnasts competed in the compulsory and optional rounds on July 29 and 31. The eight highest scoring gymnasts advanced to the final on August 4. Each country was limited to two competitors in the final. Half of the points earned by each gymnast during both the compulsory and optional rounds carried over to the final. This constitutes the "prelim" score. The results were notable for the shared gold medal between the top two scorers.

Rank	Gymnast	Nation	Preliminary			Final		
Rank	Gymnast	Nation	Compulsory	Voluntary	Total	1/2 Prelim.	Final	Total
1st place, gold medalist(s)	Koji Gushiken	Japan	9.90	9.90	19.80	9.900	9.950	19.850
1st place, gold medalist(s)	Li Ning	China	9.80	10.00	19.80	9.900	9.950	19.850
3rd place, bronze medalist(s)	Mitchell Gaylord	United States	9.85	10.00	19.85	9.925	9.900	19.825
4	Tong Fei	China	9.70	10.00	19.70	9.850	9.900	19.750
4	Peter Vidmar	United States	9.80	9.90	19.70	9.850	9.900	19.750
6	Kyoji Yamawaki	Japan	9.75	9.90	19.65	9.825	9.900	19.725
7	Emilian Nicula	Romania	9.70	9.90	19.60	9.800	9.700	19.500
8	Josef Zellweger	Switzerland	9.75	9.80	19.55	9.775	9.600	19.375
9	Tim Daggett	United States	9.75	9.90	19.65	Did not advance		
9	Xu Zhiqiang	China	9.70	9.95	19.65	Did not advance		
11	Jim Hartung	United States	9.80	9.80	19.60	Did not advance		
11	Nobuyuki Kajitani	Japan	9.80	9.80	19.60	Did not advance		
13	Bart Conner	United States	9.70	9.85	19.55	Did not advance		
13	Daniel Gaudet	Canada	9.70	9.85	19.55	Did not advance		
15	Laurent Barbiéri	France	9.60	9.90	19.50	Did not advance		
15	Philippe Chartrand	Canada	9.65	9.85	19.50	Did not advance		
15	Jürgen Geiger	West Germany	9.70	9.80	19.50	Did not advance		
15	Scott Johnson	United States	9.65	9.85	19.50	Did not advance		
15	Markus Lehmann	Switzerland	9.70	9.80	19.50	Did not advance		
15	Lou Yun	China	9.60	9.90	19.50	Did not advance		
15	Andrew Morris	Great Britain	9.70	9.80	19.50	Did not advance		
15	Valentin Pîntea	Romania	9.70	9.80	19.50	Did not advance		
23	Li Xiaoping	China	9.55	9.90	19.45	Did not advance		
23	Miguel Soler	Spain	9.65	9.80	19.45	Did not advance		
25	Rocco Amboni	Italy	9.70	9.70	19.40	Did not advance		
25	Werner Birnbaum	Australia	9.70	9.70	19.40	Did not advance		
25	Noritoshi Hirata	Japan	9.65	9.75	19.40	Did not advance		
25	Diego Lazzarich	Italy	9.65	9.75	19.40	Did not advance		
25	Volker Rohrwick	West Germany	9.60	9.80	19.40	Did not advance		
30	Jang Tae-eun	South Korea	9.55	9.80	19.35	Did not advance		
30	Koji Sotomura	Japan	9.75	9.60	19.35	Did not advance		
30	Barry Winch	Great Britain	9.60	9.75	19.35	Did not advance		
33	Jean-Luc Cairon	France	9.50	9.80	19.30	Did not advance		
33	Bruno Cavelti	Switzerland	9.60	9.70	19.30	Did not advance		
33	Benno Groß	West Germany	9.50	9.80	19.30	Did not advance		
33	Keith Langley	Great Britain	9.60	9.70	19.30	Did not advance		
33	Shinji Morisue	Japan	9.50	9.80	19.30	Did not advance		
33	Brad Peters	Canada	9.50	9.80	19.30	Did not advance		
33	Daniel Winkler	West Germany	9.60	9.70	19.30	Did not advance		
40	Andreas Japtok	West Germany	9.45	9.80	19.25	Did not advance		
40	Li Yuejiu	China	9.40	9.85	19.25	Did not advance		
42	Jacques Def	France	9.50	9.70	19.20	Did not advance		
42	Frank Nutzenberger	Canada	9.50	9.70	19.20	Did not advance		
44	Marco Piatti	Switzerland	9.50	9.65	19.15	Did not advance		
44	Bernhard Simmelbauer	West Germany	9.45	9.70	19.15	Did not advance		
46	Vittorio Allievi	Italy	9.60	9.50	19.10	Did not advance		
46	Terence Bartlett	Great Britain	9.40	9.70	19.10	Did not advance		
46	Ju Yeong-sam	South Korea	9.50	9.60	19.10	Did not advance		
46	Lee Jeoung-sik	South Korea	9.40	9.70	19.10	Did not advance		
46	Allan Reddon	Canada	9.40	9.70	19.10	Did not advance		
51	Richard Benyon	Great Britain	9.40	9.65	19.05	Did not advance		
51	Warren Long	Canada	9.40	9.65	19.05	Did not advance		
51	Urs Meister	Switzerland	9.35	9.70	19.05	Did not advance		
51	Daniel Wunderlin	Switzerland	9.40	9.65	19.05	Did not advance		
55	Antonio Fraguas	Spain	9.35	9.65	19.00	Did not advance		
55	Johan Jonasson	Sweden	9.30	9.70	19.00	Did not advance		
57	Finn Gjertsen	Norway	9.50	9.45	18.95	Did not advance		
58	Robert Edmonds	Australia	9.35	9.55	18.90	Did not advance		
58	Tony Piñeda	Mexico	9.35	9.55	18.90	Did not advance		
60	Han Chung-sik	South Korea	9.20	9.65	18.85	Did not advance		
61	Philippe Vatuone	France	9.30	9.50	18.80	Did not advance		
62	Yohanan Moyal	Israel	9.30	9.45	18.75	Did not advance		
63	Maurizio Zonzini	San Marino	9.60	9.10	18.70	Did not advance		
64	Michel Boutard	France	9.10	9.55	18.65	Did not advance		
65	Ya'akov Levi	Israel	9.10	9.50	18.60	Did not advance		
65	Joël Suty	France	9.10	9.50	18.60	Did not advance		
65	Eddie Van Hoof	Great Britain	9.20	9.40	18.60	Did not advance		
68	Nam Seung-gu	South Korea	8.85	9.65	18.50	Did not advance		
69	Gerson Gnoatto	Brazil	9.05	9.40	18.45	Did not advance		
70	Chae Gwang-seok	South Korea	9.15	9.15	18.30	Did not advance		
71	Alfonso Rodríguez	Spain	8.40	9.75	18.15	Did not advance		
