= Gymnastics at the 1984 Summer Olympics – Men's parallel bars =

Olympic gymnastics event

Men's parallel bars at the Games of the XXIII Olympiad
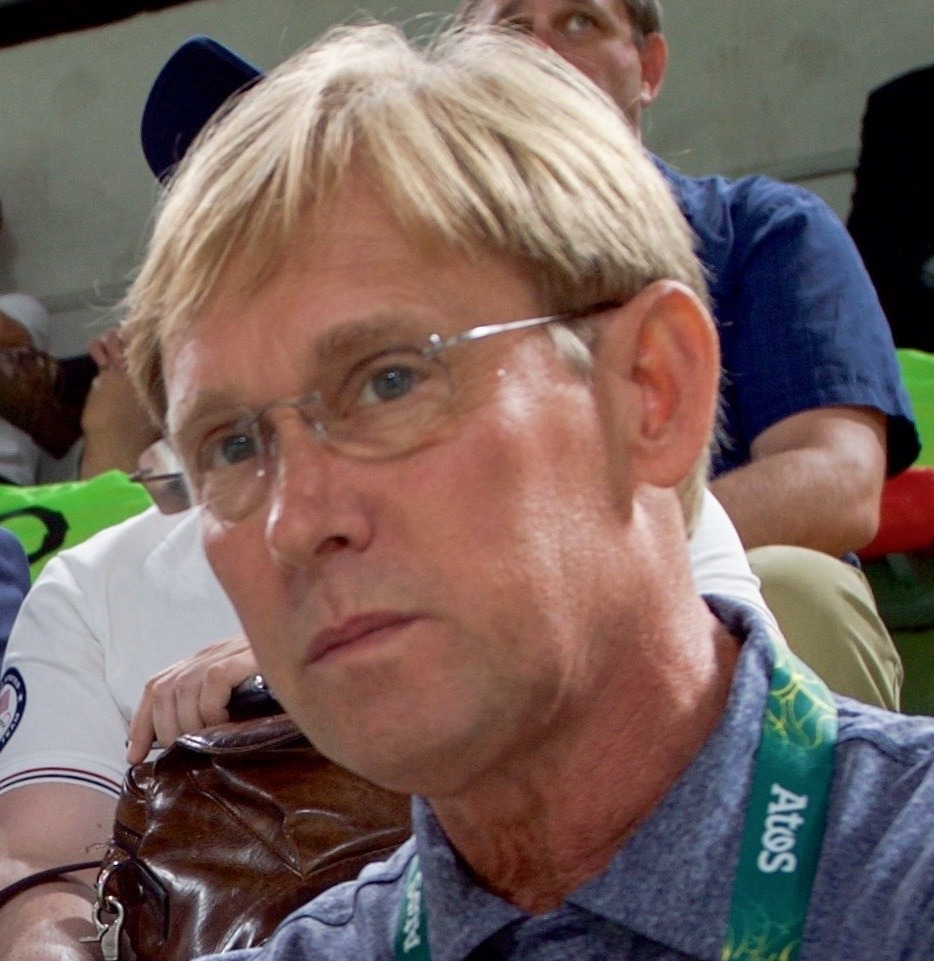
- Bart Conner (2016)
- Venue: Pauley Pavilion
- Dates: 29 July – 4 August 1984
- Competitors: 71 from 19 nations
- Winning score: 19.950

Medalists
1st place, gold medalist(s)		Bart Conner; United States
2nd place, silver medalist(s)		Nobuyuki Kajitani; Japan
3rd place, bronze medalist(s)		Mitch Gaylord; United States

The men's parallel bars competition was one of eight events for male competitors in artistic gymnastics at the 1984 Summer Olympics in Los Angeles. The qualification and final rounds took place on July 29, 31 and August 4 at UCLA’s Pauley Pavilion. There were 71 competitors from 19 nations, with nations competing in the team event having 6 gymnasts while other nations could have to up to 3 gymnasts. The event was won by Bart Conner of the United States, the nation's first victory in the parallel bars since 1904 and second overall. Another American, Mitch Gaylord, took bronze. Japan returned to the podium after the 1980 boycott broke its six-Games medal (and four-Games gold medal) streak, with Nobuyuki Kajitani's silver.

== Background ==
This was the 16th appearance of the event, which is one of the five apparatus events held every time there were apparatus events at the Summer Olympics (no apparatus events were held in 1900, 1908, 1912, or 1920). None of the six finalists from 1980 returned; all six were from boycotting nations. American Bart Conner had won the 1979 world championship, missing the 1980 Games due to the boycott. Koji Gushiken of Japan and Lou Yun of China had shared the 1981 and 1983 world championships, respectively, with Soviet gymnasts. Thus, even without the Soviets, there was a strong and competitive field for the event.

The People's Republic of China and San Marino each made their debut in the men's parallel bars. The United States made its 14th appearance, breaking a tie with the absent Hungary for most of any nation; the Americans had missed only the inaugural 1896 event and the boycotted 1980 Games.

== Competition format ==
Each nation entered a team of six gymnasts or up to three individual gymnasts. All entrants in the gymnastics competitions performed both a compulsory exercise and a voluntary exercise for each apparatus. The scores for all 12 exercises were summed to give an individual all-around score. These exercise scores were also used for qualification for the apparatus finals. The two exercises (compulsory and voluntary) for each apparatus were summed to give an apparatus score.

The 1984 Games expanded the number of finalists from six to eight. Nations were still limited to two finalists each. Others were ranked 9th through 71st. Half of the preliminary score carried over to the final.

== Schedule ==
All times are Pacific Daylight Time (UTC-7)

Date	Time	Round
Sunday, 29 July 1984		Preliminary: Compulsory
Tuesday, 31 July 1984		Preliminary: Voluntary
Saturday, 4 August 1984	17:30	Final

== Results ==
Seventy-one gymnasts competed in the compulsory and optional rounds on July 29 and 31. The eight highest scoring gymnasts advanced to the final on August 4. Each country was limited to two competitors in the final. Half of the points earned by each gymnast during both the compulsory and optional rounds carried over to the final. This constitutes the "prelim" score.

Rank	Gymnast	Nation	Preliminary			Final		
Rank	Gymnast	Nation	Compulsory	Voluntary	Total	1/2 Prelim.	Final	Total
1st place, gold medalist(s)	Bart Conner	United States	9.90	10.00	19.90	9.950	10.000	19.950
2nd place, silver medalist(s)	Nobuyuki Kajitani	Japan	9.95	9.90	19.85	9.925	10.000	19.925
3rd place, bronze medalist(s)	Mitchell Gaylord	United States	10.00	9.90	19.90	9.950	9.900	19.850
4	Tong Fei	China	9.85	9.90	19.75	9.875	9.950	19.825
5	Kōji Gushiken	Japan	9.90	9.90	19.80	9.900	9.900	19.800
6	Li Ning	China	9.85	9.90	19.75	9.875	9.900	19.775
7	Daniel Winkler	West Germany	9.75	9.85	19.60	9.800	9.800	19.600
7	Jürgen Geiger	West Germany	9.80	9.80	19.60	9.800	9.800	19.600
9	Peter Vidmar	United States	9.90	9.90	19.80	Did not advance		
10	Xu Zhiqiang	China	9.80	9.95	19.75	Did not advance		
11	Tim Daggett	United States	9.80	9.90	19.70	Did not advance		
12	Jim Hartung	United States	9.75	9.90	19.65	Did not advance		
13	Lou Yun	China	9.70	9.90	19.60	Did not advance		
14	Noritoshi Hirata	Japan	9.75	9.80	19.55	Did not advance		
15	Kyoji Yamawaki	Japan	9.60	9.90	19.50	Did not advance		
16	Li Yuejiu	China	9.55	9.90	19.45	Did not advance		
17	Andreas Japtok	West Germany	9.70	9.70	19.40	Did not advance		
17	Scott Johnson	United States	9.60	9.80	19.40	Did not advance		
17	Joël Suty	France	9.60	9.80	19.40	Did not advance		
20	Li Xiaoping	China	9.60	9.75	19.35	Did not advance		
21	Benno Groß	West Germany	9.90	9.40	19.30	Did not advance		
21	Jang Tae-eun	South Korea	9.80	9.50	19.30	Did not advance		
21	Volker Rohrwick	West Germany	9.55	9.75	19.30	Did not advance		
21	Bernhard Simmelbauer	West Germany	9.60	9.70	19.30	Did not advance		
25	Jean-Luc Cairon	France	9.50	9.75	19.25	Did not advance		
25	Lee Jeoung-sik	South Korea	9.75	9.50	19.25	Did not advance		
27	Marco Piatti	Switzerland	9.65	9.55	19.20	Did not advance		
27	Daniel Wunderlin	Switzerland	9.65	9.55	19.20	Did not advance		
27	Markus Lehmann	Switzerland	9.60	9.60	19.20	Did not advance		
27	Brad Peters	Canada	9.70	9.50	19.20	Did not advance		
31	Philippe Chartrand	Canada	9.70	9.45	19.15	Did not advance		
31	Koji Sotomura	Japan	9.40	9.75	19.15	Did not advance		
33	Laurent Barbiéri	France	9.45	9.65	19.10	Did not advance		
33	Josef Zellweger	Switzerland	9.80	9.30	19.10	Did not advance		
35	Shinji Morisue	Japan	9.15	9.90	19.05	Did not advance		
35	Han Chung-sik	South Korea	9.60	9.45	19.05	Did not advance		
37	Warren Long	Canada	9.55	9.45	19.00	Did not advance		
37	Emilian Nicula	Romania	9.60	9.40	19.00	Did not advance		
37	Valentin Pîntea	Romania	9.60	9.40	19.00	Did not advance		
37	Allan Reddon	Canada	9.60	9.40	19.00	Did not advance		
37	Miguel Soler	Spain	9.60	9.40	19.00	Did not advance		
37	Philippe Vatuone	France	9.45	9.55	19.00	Did not advance		
43	Terence Bartlett	Great Britain	9.55	9.40	18.95	Did not advance		
43	Michel Boutard	France	9.35	9.60	18.95	Did not advance		
45	Chae Gwang-seok	South Korea	9.50	9.40	18.90	Did not advance		
46	Antonio Fraguas	Spain	9.65	9.20	18.85	Did not advance		
46	Ju Yeong-sam	South Korea	9.40	9.45	18.85	Did not advance		
46	Frank Nutzenberger	Canada	9.55	9.30	18.85	Did not advance		
46	Alfonso Rodríguez	Spain	9.55	9.30	18.85	Did not advance		
50	Werner Birnbaum	Australia	9.55	9.20	18.75	Did not advance		
50	Bruno Cavelti	Switzerland	9.20	9.55	18.75	Did not advance		
50	Daniel Gaudet	Canada	9.25	9.50	18.75	Did not advance		
53	Keith Langley	Great Britain	9.40	9.30	18.70	Did not advance		
53	Nam Seung-gu	South Korea	9.70	9.00	18.70	Did not advance		
55	Jacques Def	France	8.85	9.75	18.60	Did not advance		
55	Andrew Morris	Great Britain	9.60	9.00	18.60	Did not advance		
57	Tony Piñeda	Mexico	9.60	8.90	18.50	Did not advance		
58	Vittorio Allievi	Italy	9.70	8.75	18.45	Did not advance		
59	Carl Beynon	Great Britain	9.20	9.20	18.40	Did not advance		
59	Barry Winch	Great Britain	8.95	9.45	18.40	Did not advance		
61	Finn Gjertsen	Norway	9.45	8.90	18.35	Did not advance		
61	Maurizio Zonzini	San Marino	9.30	9.05	18.35	Did not advance		
63	Yohanan Moyal	Israel	9.10	9.15	18.25	Did not advance		
64	Urs Meister	Switzerland	8.80	9.30	18.10	Did not advance		
65	Diego Lazzarich	Italy	9.55	8.50	18.05	Did not advance		
66	Rob Edmonds	Australia	9.45	8.50	17.95	Did not advance		
66	Johan Jonasson	Sweden	9.10	8.85	17.95	Did not advance		
68	Eddie Van Hoof	Great Britain	9.15	8.70	17.85	Did not advance		
69	Rocco Amboni	Italy	8.45	9.25	17.70	Did not advance		
70	Gerson Gnoatto	Brazil	8.20	8.75	16.95	Did not advance		
71	Ya'akov Levi	Israel	8.20	7.20	15.40	Did not advance		
