= 1985 European Men's Artistic Gymnastics Championships =

16th European Men's Artistic Gymnastics Championships
- Location: Oslo, Norway
- Start date: 1 June 1985
- End date: 2 June 1985

The 16th European Men's Artistic Gymnastics Championships was held in Oslo, Norway from 1–2 June 1985.

== Medalists ==
| Event | Gold | Silver | Bronze |
|---|---|---|---|
| All-around | (Soviet Union) Dmitry Bilozerchev | (Soviet Union) Valentin Mogilny | (Soviet Union) Vladimir Gogoladze |
| Floor | (Soviet Union) Dmitry Bilozerchev | (France) Philippe Vatuone | (France) Laurent Barbiéri |
| Pommel horse | (Soviet Union) Dmitry Bilozerchev | (Hungary) György Guczoghy (East Germany) Sylvio Kroll | Not awarded |
| Rings | (Soviet Union) Dmitry Bilozerchev | (Soviet Union) Valentin Mogilny | (Romania) Valentin Pîntea |
| Vault | (East Germany) Sylvio Kroll | (Soviet Union) Dmitry Bilozerchev | (Hungary) Zsolt Borkai (West Germany) Albert Haschar |
| Parallel bars | (Soviet Union) Dmitry Bilozerchev | (East Germany) Sylvio Kroll | (Soviet Union) Vladimir Gogoladze (East Germany) Ulf Hoffmann |
| Horizontal bar | (Soviet Union) Dmitry Bilozerchev (Hungary) Zsolt Borkai | Not awarded | (Romania) Marius Gherman |

=== Medal table ===
| Rank | Nation | Gold | Silver | Bronze | Total |
|---|---|---|---|---|---|
| 1 | Soviet Union (URS) | 6 | 3 | 2 | 11 |
| 2 | East Germany (GDR) | 1 | 2 | 1 | 4 |
| 3 | Hungary (HUN) | 1 | 1 | 1 | 3 |
| 4 | France (FRA) | 0 | 1 | 1 | 2 |
| 5 | Romania (ROM) | 0 | 0 | 2 | 2 |
| 6 | West Germany (FRG) | 0 | 0 | 1 | 1 |
| Totals (6 entries) | | 8 | 7 | 8 | 23 |

== Results ==
=== All Around ===
All competitors took part in the all-around with no prior qualification. Here are the top 10 finishes.

| Rank | Athlete | Nation | Apparatus | | | | | | Total |
| Rank | Athlete | Nation | F | PH | R | V | PB | HB | Total |
|---|---|---|---|---|---|---|---|---|---|
| 1st place, gold medalist(s) | Dmitry Bilozerchev | Soviet Union (URS) | 9.600 | 9.800 | 9.700 | 9.650 | 9.900 | 9.800 | 58.450 |
| 2nd place, silver medalist(s) | Valentin Mogilny | Soviet Union (URS) | 9.500 | 9.700 | 9.650 | 9.500 | 9.550 | 9.700 | 57.600 |
| 3rd place, bronze medalist(s) | Vladimir Gogoladze | Soviet Union (URS) | 9.450 | 9.650 | 9.450 | 9.500 | 9.650 | 9.700 | 57.400 |
| 4 | Sylvio Kroll | East Germany (GDR) | 9.300 | 9.700 | 9.300 | 9.700 | 9.700 | 9.600 | 57.300 |
| 5 | Ulf Hoffmann | East Germany (GDR) | 9.400 | 9.450 | 9.200 | 9.500 | 9.700 | 9.700 | 56.950 |
| 6 | Holger Behrendt | East Germany (GDR) | 9.250 | 9.500 | 9.400 | 9.500 | 9.700 | 9.450 | 56.800 |
| 7 | Laurent Barbiéri | France (FRA) | 9.600 | 9.300 | 9.350 | 9.500 | 9.400 | 9.500 | 56.650 |
| 8 | György Guczoghy | Hungary (HUN) | 9.100 | 9.700 | 9.450 | 9.500 | 9.200 | 9.650 | 56.600 |
| 9 | Zsolt Borkai | Hungary (HUN) | 8.800 | 9.600 | 9.250 | 9.550 | 9.300 | 9.800 | 56.300 |
| 10 | Sepp Zellweger | Switzerland (SUI) | 9.050 | 9.300 | 9.450 | 9.450 | 9.550 | 9.150 | 55.950 |

=== Floor ===
| Rank | Gymnast | Total |
|---|---|---|
| 1st place, gold medalist(s) | (Soviet Union) Dmitry Bilozerchev | 19.350 |
| 2nd place, silver medalist(s) | (France) Philippe Vatuone | 19.200 |
| 3rd place, bronze medalist(s) | (France) Laurent Barbiéri | 19.100 |
| 4 | (Soviet Union) Valentin Mogilny | 19.050 |
| 5 | (Hungary) Jenő Paprika | 18.950 |
| 6 | (Romania) Valentin Pîntea | 18.850 |
| 7 | (East Germany) Ulf Hoffmann | 18.700 |
| 8 | (Bulgaria) Zdravko Stoyanov | 18.450 |

=== Pommel horse ===
| Rank | Gymnast | Total |
|---|---|---|
| 1st place, gold medalist(s) | (Soviet Union) Dmitry Bilozerchev | 19.650 |
| 2nd place, silver medalist(s) | (Hungary) György Guczoghy | 19.500 |
| 2nd place, silver medalist(s) | (East Germany) Sylvio Kroll | 19.500 |
| 4 | (Soviet Union) Valentin Mogilny | 19.400 |
| 5 | (Hungary) Zsolt Borkai | 19.300 |
| 6 | (Bulgaria) Petar Georgiev | 19.000 |
| 7 | (East Germany) Holger Behrendt | 18.950 |
| 7 | (Bulgaria) Lubomir Geraskov | 18.950 |

=== Rings ===
| Rank | Gymnast | Total |
|---|---|---|
| 1st place, gold medalist(s) | (Soviet Union) Dmitry Bilozerchev | 19.450 |
| 2nd place, silver medalist(s) | (Soviet Union) Valentin Mogilny | 19.300 |
| 3rd place, bronze medalist(s) | (Romania) Valentin Pîntea | 19.050 |
| 4 | (Hungary) György Guczoghy | 18.950 |
| 4 | (Romania) Emilian Nicula | 18.950 |
| 4 | (Switzerland) Sepp Zellweger | 18.950 |
| 7 | (West Germany) Andreas Aguilar | 18.900 |
| 7 | (Sweden) Johan Jonasson | 18.900 |

=== Vault ===
| Rank | Gymnast | Total |
|---|---|---|
| 1st place, gold medalist(s) | (East Germany) Sylvio Kroll | 19.400 |
| 2nd place, silver medalist(s) | (Soviet Union) Dmitry Bilozerchev | 19.100 |
| 3rd place, bronze medalist(s) | (Hungary) Zsolt Borkai | 19.050 |
| 3rd place, bronze medalist(s) | (West Germany) Albert Haschar | 19.050 |
| 5 | (France) Laurent Barbiéri | 19.025 |
| 6 | (Switzerland) Markus Lehmann | 19.000 |
| 7 | (East Germany) Ulf Hoffmann | 18.800 |
| 8 | (Soviet Union) Valentin Mogilny | 18.700 |

=== Parallel bars ===
| Rank | Gymnast | Total |
|---|---|---|
| 1st place, gold medalist(s) | (Soviet Union) Dmitry Bilozerchev | 19.800 |
| 2nd place, silver medalist(s) | (East Germany) Sylvio Kroll | 19.500 |
| 3rd place, bronze medalist(s) | (Soviet Union) Vladimir Gogoladze | 19.400 |
| 3rd place, bronze medalist(s) | (East Germany) Ulf Hoffmann | 19.400 |
| 5 | (Switzerland) Sepp Zellweger | 19.150 |
| 6 | (Bulgaria) Zdravko Stoyanov | 19.100 |
| 7 | (Italy) Vittorio Allievi | 18.750 |
| 8 | (Czechoslovakia) Koloman Hianik | 18.400 |

=== Horizontal bar ===
| Rank | Gymnast | Total |
|---|---|---|
| 1st place, gold medalist(s) | (Soviet Union) Dmitry Bilozerchev | 19.600 |
| 1st place, gold medalist(s) | (Hungary) Zsolt Borkai | 19.600 |
| 3rd place, bronze medalist(s) | (Romania) Marius Gherman | 19.450 |
| 4 | (Romania) Emilian Nicula | 19.400 |
| 5 | (East Germany) Sylvio Kroll | 19.350 |
| 6 | (Hungary) György Guczoghy | 19.250 |
| 6 | (East Germany) Ulf Hoffmann | 19.250 |
| 8 | (Soviet Union) Valentin Mogilny | 19.200 |
