= 1984 Summer Olympics medal table =

1984 Summer Olympics medals
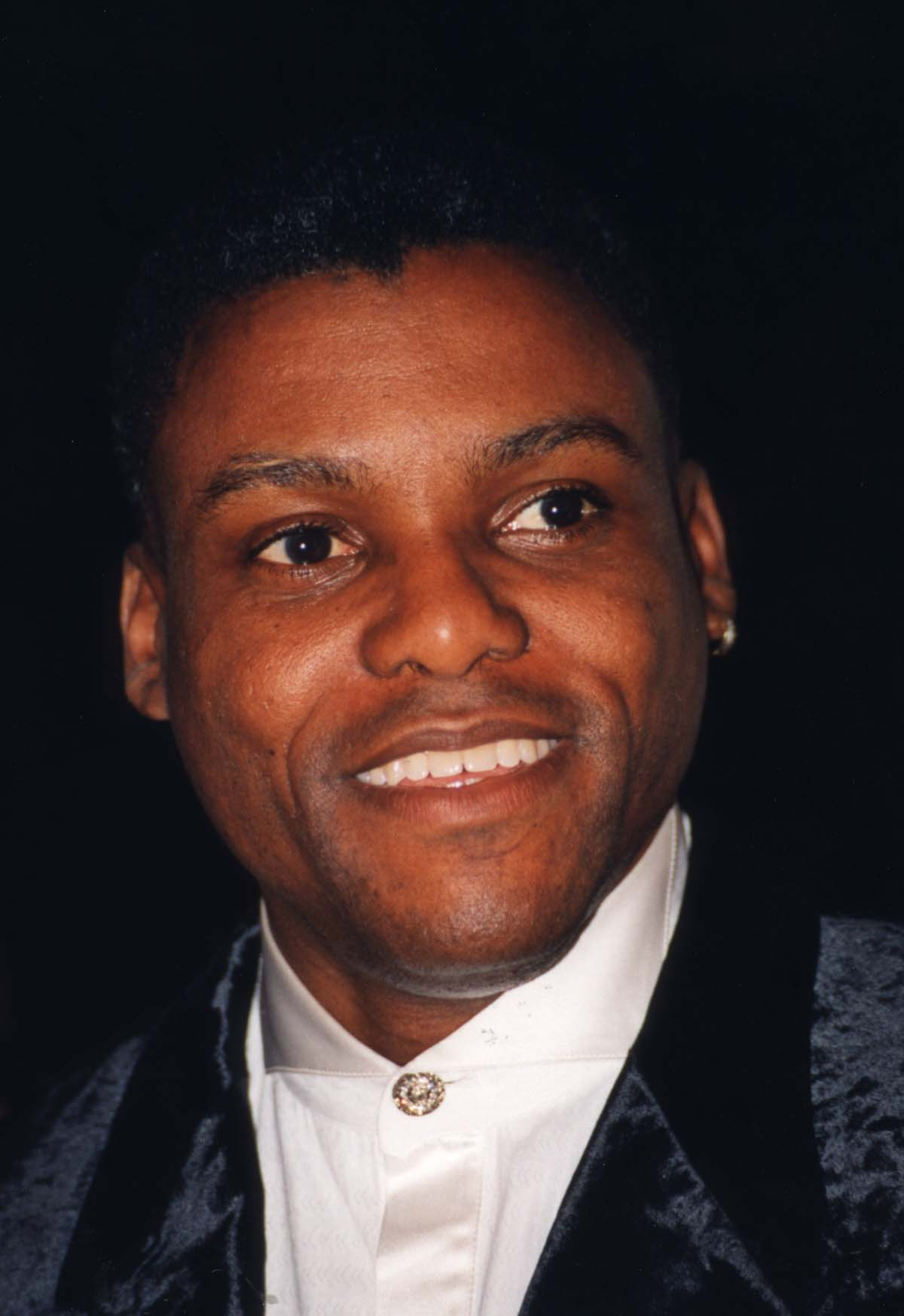
- Carl Lewis (pictured) tied Ecaterina Szabo for most gold medals won at the 1984 Summer Olympics at four apiece.
- Location: Los Angeles, United States

Highlights
- Most gold medals: United States (83)
- Most total medals: United States (174)
- Medalling NOCs: 47

World map showing the medal achievements of each country during the 1984 Summer Olympics. Legend: represents countries that won at least one gold medal. represents countries that won at least one silver medal but no gold medals. represents countries that won at least one bronze medal (no gold or silver). represents participating countries that did not win medals. represents entities that did not participate in the 1984 Summer Olympics.

The 1984 Summer Olympics, officially known as the Games of the XXIII Olympiad, were a summer multi-sport event held in Los Angeles, California, United States, from July 28 to August 12. A total of 6,829 athletes from 140 nations participated in 221 events in 21 sports.

Overall, 47 nations received at least one medal, and 25 of them won at least one gold medal. Athletes from host nation United States won the most medals overall, with 174, and the most gold medals, with 83. The former record was the largest overall medal haul for the nation since the 1904 edition; the latter record was the highest gold medal tally at a single Games in Olympic history and the most for a host nation. (Note: Previously at the 1904 Summer Olympics, the United States set the record for most gold medals won at a single Olympics, with 76. The Soviet Union then broke that record in 1980, when it won 80 gold medals amidst a Western boycott.) It marked the first time the United States led the medal count in both gold and overall medals since 1968. Sports commentators noted that the absence of the Soviet Union and various other Eastern Bloc nations stemming from a boycott contributed to the highly skewed medal results benefitting the United States and other countries. Romania won the second most gold medals (20) and the third most total medals (53), marking its highest medal tally in history. West Germany won the third most gold medals, with 17, and the second most total medals, with 59.

Runner Carl Lewis and gymnast Ecaterina Szabo won the most gold medals at the games with four each. Gymnast Li Ning won the greatest number of medals overall, winning six in total. Morocco and Portugal won their first Olympic gold medals. Algeria, Dominican Republic, Ivory Coast, Syria, and Zambia won their nation's first Olympic medals.

== Medal table ==
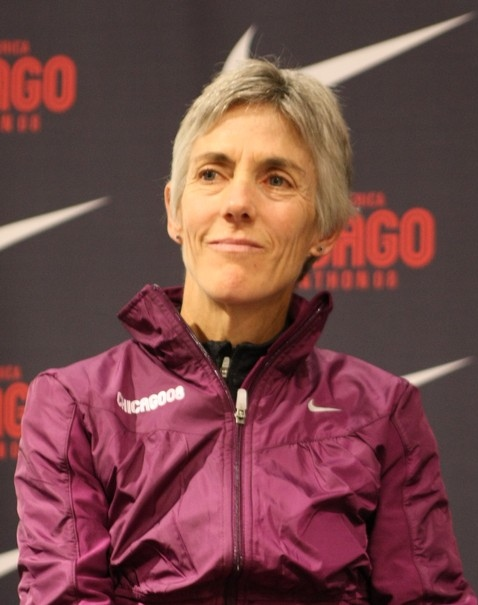
Joan Benoit won the inaugural women's marathon.

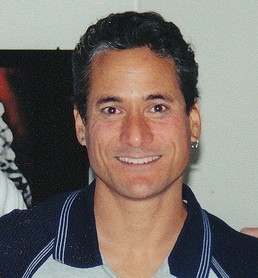
Greg Louganis won the men's 3 metre springboard and 10 platform diving competitions.

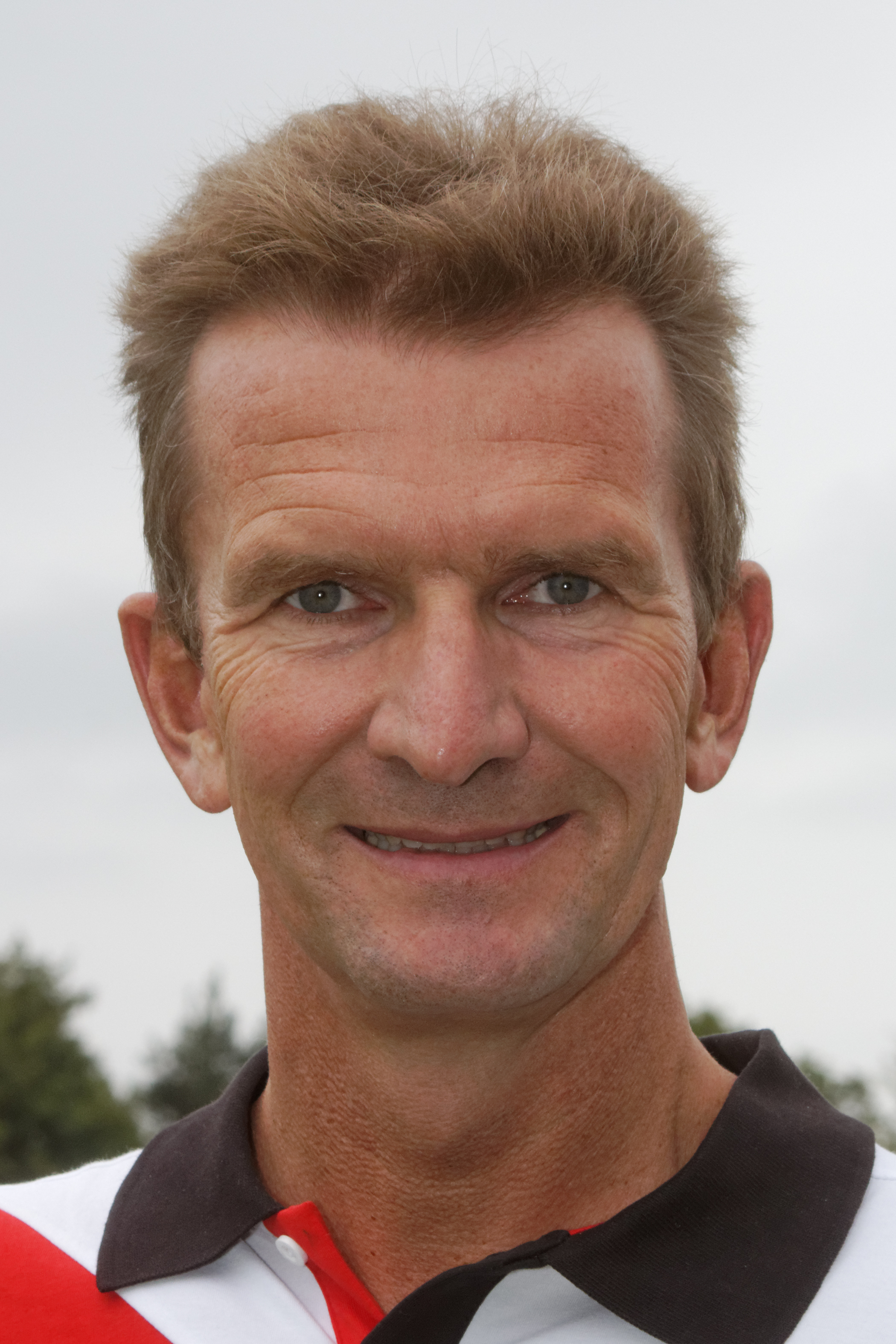
Michael Gross won gold medals in the men's 100 metre butterfly and men's 200 metre freestyle swimming events.

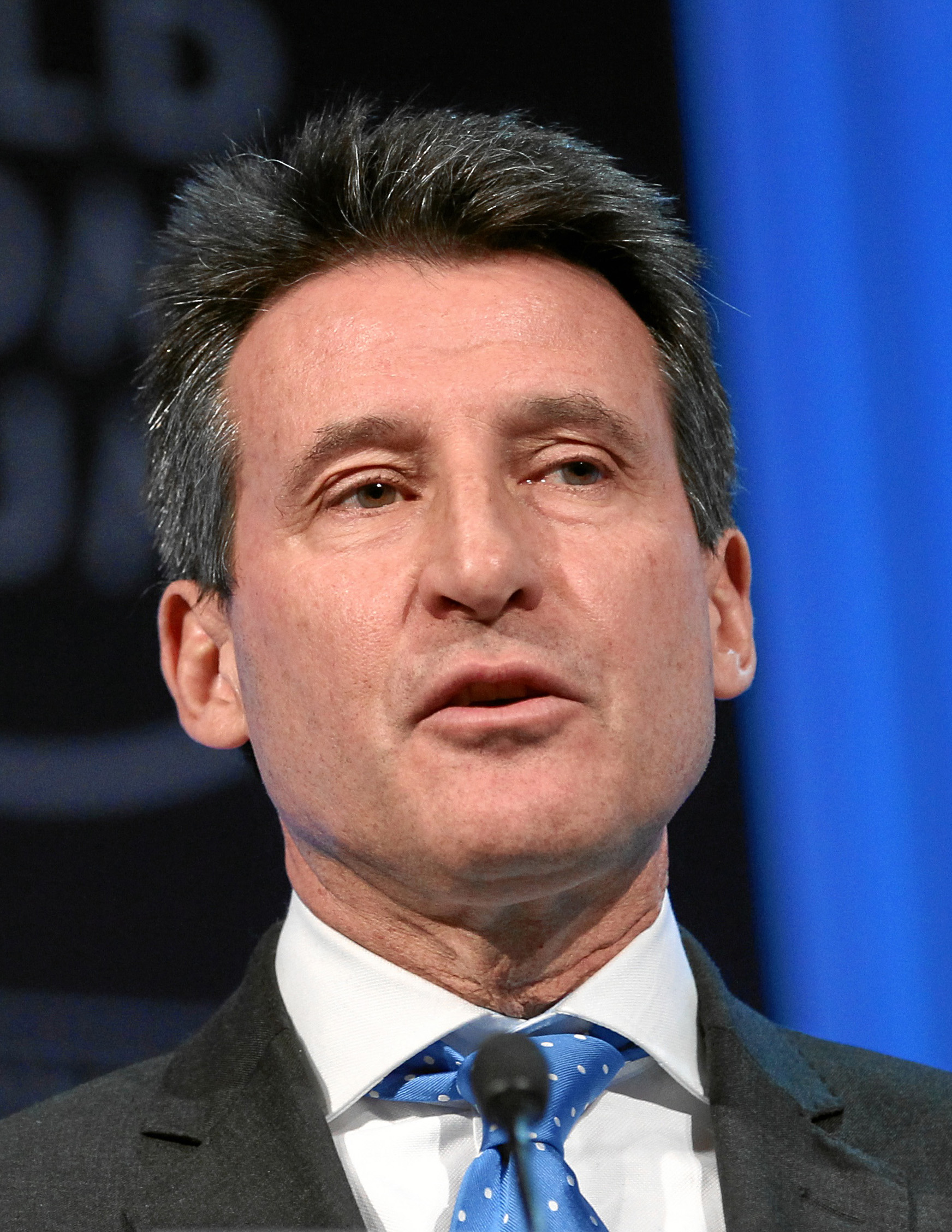
Sebastian Coe became the first person to successfully defend the men's 1500 metre title.

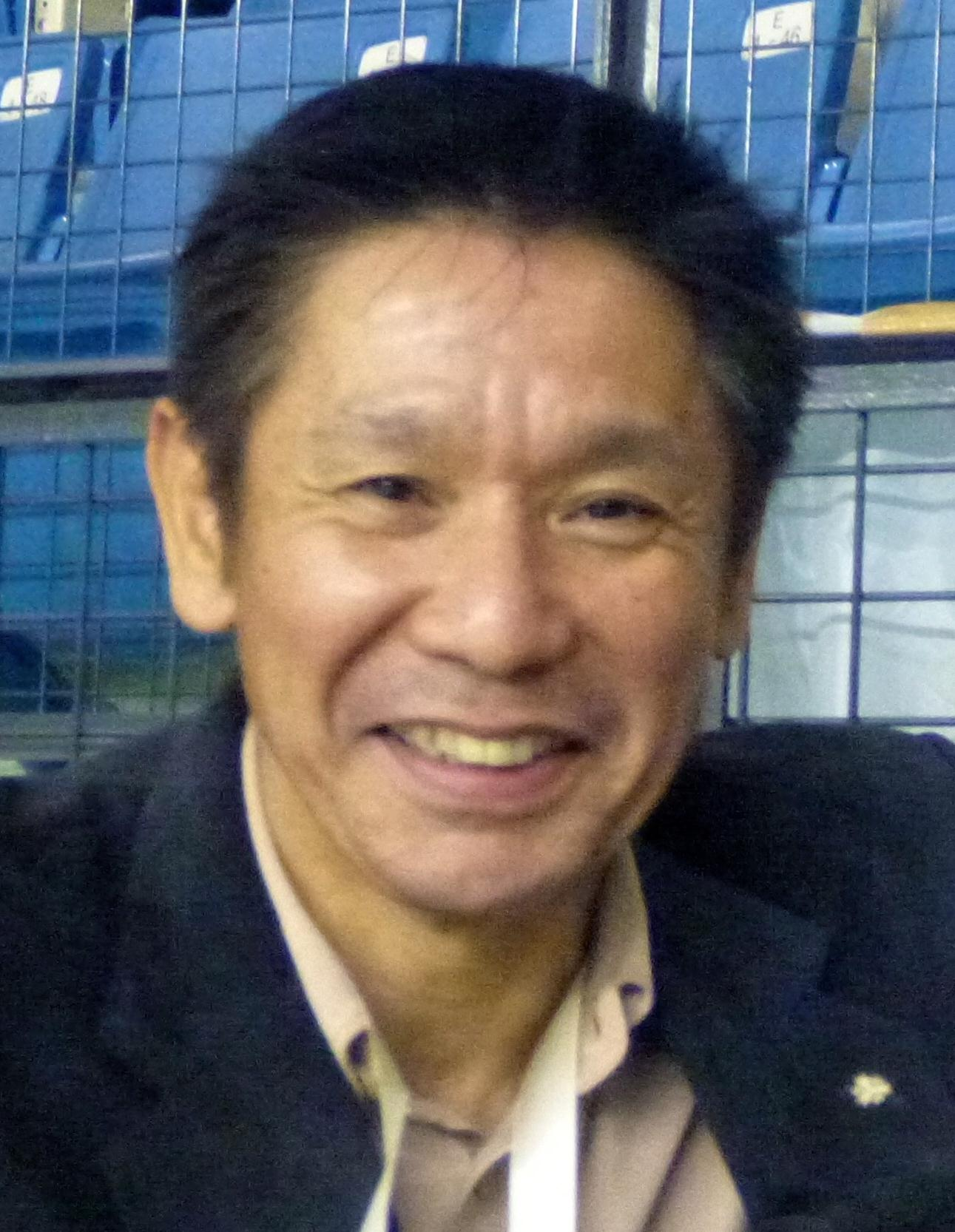
Kōji Gushiken won gold medals in the men's all-around individual and rings gymnastics competitions.

The medal table is based on information provided by the International Olympic Committee (IOC) and is consistent with IOC convention in its published medal tables. The table uses the Olympic medal table sorting method. By default, the table is ordered by the number of gold medals the athletes from a nation have won, where a nation is an entity represented by a National Olympic Committee (NOC). The number of silver medals is taken into consideration next, and then the number of bronze medals. If teams are still tied, equal ranking is given and they are listed alphabetically by their IOC country code.

In the boxing and judo events, two bronze medals are awarded in each weight class. Two gold medals (and no silver medals) were awarded for first place ties in the women's uneven bars, women's balance beam, and men's rings gymnastics events. Four silver medals (and no bronze) were awarded in the men's vault gymnastics competition. Two bronze medals were awarded for third-place ties in both the women's 100 metre hurdles and the men's pole vault competitions.

Key

‡ Changes in medal standings (see below)

* Host nation (United States)

1984 Summer Olympics medal table
Rank	NOC	Gold	Silver	Bronze	Total
1	United States*	83	61	30	174
2	Romania‡	20	16	17	53
3	West Germany	17	19	23	59
4	China	15	8	9	32
5	Italy	14	6	12	32
6	Canada	10	18	16	44
7	Japan	10	8	14	32
8	New Zealand	8	1	2	11
9	Yugoslavia‡	7	4	7	18
10	South Korea	6	6	7	19
11	Great Britain‡	5	11	21	37
12	France	5	7	16	28
13	Netherlands	5	2	6	13
14	Australia	4	8	12	24
15	Finland‡	4	2	6	12
16	Sweden‡	2	11	6	19
17	Mexico	2	3	1	6
18	Morocco	2	0	0	2
19	Brazil	1	5	2	8
20	Spain	1	2	2	5
21	Belgium	1	1	2	4
22	Austria	1	1	1	3
23	Kenya‡	1	0	2	3
23	Portugal	1	0	2	3
25	Pakistan	1	0	0	1
26	Switzerland	0	4	4	8
27	Denmark	0	3	3	6
28	Jamaica	0	1	2	3
28	Norway	0	1	2	3
30	Greece	0	1	1	2
30	Nigeria	0	1	1	2
30	Puerto Rico	0	1	1	2
33	Colombia	0	1	0	1
33	Egypt	0	1	0	1
33	Ireland	0	1	0	1
33	Ivory Coast	0	1	0	1
33	Peru	0	1	0	1
33	Syria	0	1	0	1
33	Thailand	0	1	0	1
40	Turkey	0	0	3	3
40	Venezuela	0	0	3	3
42	Algeria	0	0	2	2
43	Cameroon	0	0	1	1
43	Chinese Taipei	0	0	1	1
43	Dominican Republic	0	0	1	1
43	Iceland	0	0	1	1
43	Zambia	0	0	1	1
Totals (47 entries)		226	219	243	688

== Changes in medal standings ==
Key
Color / symbol	Meaning
※	Disqualified athlete(s)

List of official changes in medal standings
Ruling date	Sport/Event	Athlete (NOC)	1st place, gold medalist(s)	2nd place, silver medalist(s)	3rd place, bronze medalist(s)	Total	Notes
August 5, 1984	Wrestling; Men's Greco-Roman +100 kg	Tomas Johansson (SWE) ※		-1		−1	On August 5, 1984, the IOC stripped Swedish wrestler Tomas Johansson of his silver medal in the men's Greco-Roman +100 kg competition after he tested positive for the anabolic steroid Primobolan. As a result, Yugoslavian bronze medalist Refik Memišević was awarded silver, and the fourth-placed Victor Dolipschi of Romania was awarded bronze.
August 5, 1984	Wrestling; Men's Greco-Roman +100 kg	Refik Memišević (YUG)		+1	−1	0	On August 5, 1984, the IOC stripped Swedish wrestler Tomas Johansson of his silver medal in the men's Greco-Roman +100 kg competition after he tested positive for the anabolic steroid Primobolan. As a result, Yugoslavian bronze medalist Refik Memišević was awarded silver, and the fourth-placed Victor Dolipschi of Romania was awarded bronze.
August 5, 1984	Wrestling; Men's Greco-Roman +100 kg	Victor Dolipschi (ROM)			+1	+1	On August 5, 1984, the IOC stripped Swedish wrestler Tomas Johansson of his silver medal in the men's Greco-Roman +100 kg competition after he tested positive for the anabolic steroid Primobolan. As a result, Yugoslavian bronze medalist Refik Memišević was awarded silver, and the fourth-placed Victor Dolipschi of Romania was awarded bronze.
August 13, 1984	Athletics; Athletics, Men's 10,000 m	Martti Vainio (FIN) ※		-1		−1	On August 13, 1984, the IOC stripped Finnish long-distance runner Martti Vainio of his silver medal in the men's 10,000 m race after failing an anti-doping test. As a result, bronze medalist Mike McLeod of Great Britain was awarded silver, and Kenyan runner Michael Musyoki, who placed fourth in the competition, was awarded bronze.
August 13, 1984	Athletics; Athletics, Men's 10,000 m	Mike McLeod (GBR)		+1	−1	0	On August 13, 1984, the IOC stripped Finnish long-distance runner Martti Vainio of his silver medal in the men's 10,000 m race after failing an anti-doping test. As a result, bronze medalist Mike McLeod of Great Britain was awarded silver, and Kenyan runner Michael Musyoki, who placed fourth in the competition, was awarded bronze.
August 13, 1984	Athletics; Athletics, Men's 10,000 m	Michael Musyoki (KEN)			+1	+1	On August 13, 1984, the IOC stripped Finnish long-distance runner Martti Vainio of his silver medal in the men's 10,000 m race after failing an anti-doping test. As a result, bronze medalist Mike McLeod of Great Britain was awarded silver, and Kenyan runner Michael Musyoki, who placed fourth in the competition, was awarded bronze.

List of official changes by country
NOC	Gold	Silver	Bronze	Net Change
Finland	0	−1	0	−1
Sweden	0	-1	0	−1
Great Britain	0	+1	–1	0
Yugoslavia	0	+1	–1	0
Kenya	0	0	+1	+1
Romania	0	0	+1	+1

== See also ==
- All-time Olympic Games medal table
- 1984 Summer Paralympics medal table
