= Ya'akov Levi =

Israeli artistic gymnast

Ya'akov Levi יעקב לוי
- Born: September 11, 1964 (age 61) Israel

Gymnastics career
- Discipline: Men's artistic gymnastics
- Country represented: Israel
- Club: Hapoel Holon

Ya'akov Levi (Hebrew: יעקב לוי; born September 11, 1964) is an Israeli former Olympic gymnast.

He was born in Israel and is Jewish.

== Gymnastics career ==
Levi competed for Hapoel Holon.

Levi competed for Israel at the 1984 Summer Olympics in Los Angeles, California, in gymnastics at the age of 19. In the Men's Individual All-Around he came in 71st, in the Men's Floor Exercise he came in 61st, in the Men's Horse Vault he came in tied for 68th, in the Men's Parallel Bars he came in 71st, in the Men's Horizontal Bar he came in tied for 70th, in the Men's Rings he came in tied for 65th, and in the Men's Pommel Horse he came in 71st.

Levi won the Israeli national individual all-around championship from 1985 to 1988.

He participated in four World Artistic Gymnastics Championships between 1983 and 1991. In the 1983 World Artistic Gymnastics Championships, he helped the Israeli team finish 25th overall while he placed 94th in the individual all-around. In the 1987 World Artistic Gymnastics Championships, Levi competed in the team (23rd) and individual (106th) events at the Championships; he competed exclusively in the team event in the 1989 World Artistic Gymnastics Championships and the 1993 World Artistic Gymnastics Championships (Israel finished in 22nd place both years). In 1990, Levi was also a member of the Israeli team at the European Men's Artistic Gymnastics Championships, and came in 53rd in the individual all-around.
