= Yohanan Moyal =

Israeli artistic gymnast

Yohanan Moyal יוחנן מויאל
- Nickname: Johnny
- Born: October 2, 1965 (age 60) Israel
- Height: 5 ft 4.5 in (164 cm)

Gymnastics career
- Discipline: Men's artistic gymnastics
- Country represented: Israel
- College team: University of Oregon and Louisiana State University

Yohanan Moyal ("Johnny"; Hebrew: יוחנן מויאל; born October 2, 1965) is an Israeli former Olympic gymnast.

== Early life ==
He was born in Israel, and is Jewish. His mother, a ballerina, was a Holocaust survivor. He attended the University of Oregon where he competed in gymnastics, and Louisiana State University, where he was an All American in gymnastics.

== Gymnastics career ==
He competed for Israel at the 1984 Summer Olympics in Los Angeles, California, when he was 18 years old. In the Men's Individual All-Around he came in 67th, in the Men's Floor Exercise he came in tied for 70th, in the Men's Horse Vault he came in tied for 68th, in the Men's Parallel Bars he came in 63rd, in the Men's Horizontal Bar he came in 65th, in the Men's Rings he came in 62nd, and in the Men's Pommel Horse he came in 64th. When he competed in the Olympics he was 5 ft 4.5 in (164 cm) tall and weighed 132 lb (60 kg).

== Coaching career ==
Moyal founded Elite Gymnastics Academy in Baton Rouge, Louisiana, in 1987 where he is the owner and coach. Among those whom he had coached is Carly Patterson, the 2004 Olympic all-around champion and a member of the USA Gymnastics Hall of Fame.
