= Tong Fei =

Chinese artistic gymnast

- Born: 25 March 1961 (age 65)

Gymnastics career
- Discipline: Men's artistic gymnastics
- Country represented: China
Medal record
Olympic Games
Silver medal – second place	1984 Los Angeles	Team
Silver medal – second place	1984 Los Angeles	Horizontal bar
World Championships
Gold medal – first place	1983 Budapest	Team
Gold medal – first place	1983 Budapest	Floor
Gold medal – first place	1985 Montreal	Floor
Gold medal – first place	1985 Montreal	Horizontal bar
Silver medal – second place	1985 Montreal	Team
Bronze medal – third place	1981 Moscow	Team
Bronze medal – third place	1983 Budapest	Parallel bars
Asian Games
Gold medal – first place	1982 New Delhi	Team
Gold medal – first place	1982 New Delhi	Floor Exercise
Silver medal – second place	1982 New Delhi	All-Around
Silver medal – second place	1982 New Delhi	Parallel Bars
Bronze medal – third place	1982 New Delhi	Horizontal Bar

Tong Fei (Chinese: 童非; born 25 March 1961) is a Chinese retired gymnast. He competed at the 1984 Olympic Games and won a silver medal in men's horizontal bar (score: 19.975). He also helped Chinese men's gymnastics team to win a silver medal in team competition.
