= Nobuyuki Kajitani =

Japanese artistic gymnast

- 梶谷 信之
- Born: 3 May 1955 (age 71) Saito, Miyazaki, Japan
- Height: 1.56 m (5 ft 1 in)

Gymnastics career
- Discipline: Men's artistic gymnastics
- Country represented: Japan
Medal record
Men's artistic gymnastics
Representing Japan
Olympic Games
Silver medal – second place	1984 Los Angeles	Parallel bars
Bronze medal – third place	1984 Los Angeles	Team
Asian Games
Silver medal – second place	1978 Bangkok	Team

Nobuyuki Kajitani (梶谷 信之, Kajitani Nobuyuki; born May 3, 1955 in Saito City, Miyazaki) is a Japanese former gymnast who competed in the 1984 Summer Olympics. Kajitani is a graduate of the Nippon College of Physical Education.
