= Bart Conner =

American gymnast (born 1958)

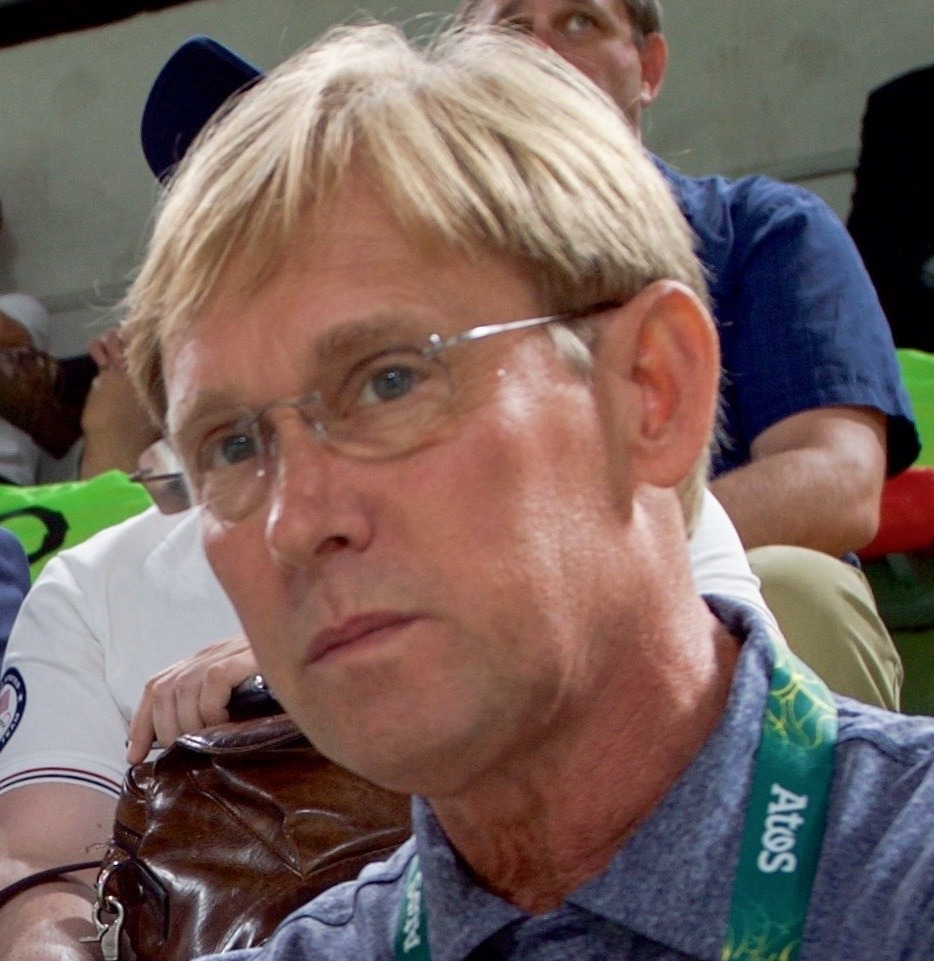
- Conner at the 2016 Summer Olympics

Personal information
- Full name: Barthold Wayne Conner
- Born: March 28, 1958 (age 68) Chicago, Illinois, U.S.
- Height: 165 cm (5 ft 5 in)
- Spouse: Nadia Comăneci (m. 1996)

Gymnastics career
- Discipline: Men's artistic gymnastics
- Country represented: United States
- College team: Oklahoma Sooners
- Head coach: Paul Ziert
- Eponymous skills: Conner (parallel bars)
Medal record
Men's artistic gymnastics
Representing United States
Event	1st	2nd	3rd
Olympic Games	2	0	0
World Championships	1	0	2
Pan American Games	1	0	2
Total	4	0	4
Olympic Games
Gold medal – first place	1984 Los Angeles	Team
Gold medal – first place	1984 Los Angeles	Parallel bars
World Championships
Gold medal – first place	1979 Fort Worth	Parallel bars
Bronze medal – third place	1979 Fort Worth	Team
Bronze medal – third place	1979 Fort Worth	Vault
Pan American Games
Gold medal – first place	1975 Mexico City	Team
Bronze medal – third place	1975 Mexico City	Floor
Bronze medal – third place	1975 Mexico City	Rings

Barthold Wayne Conner (born March 28, 1958) is an American retired Olympic gymnast. He was a member of the United States men's national artistic gymnastics team and won two gold medals at the 1984 Summer Olympics. He owns and operates the Bart Conner Gymnastics Academy in Norman, Oklahoma, along with his wife, Romanian Olympic gold medalist Nadia Comăneci. In addition, Conner is a long-time gymnastics commentator, and both Comăneci and Conner are highly involved with the Special Olympics.

== Early life and education ==
Conner was born on March 28, 1958, the son of Harold Conner (1931-2024) and Jacqueline May (née Hulsey, later Wolthausen; 1931-2000), and is of Irish descent and grew up in Morton Grove, Illinois. He has two siblings, Michael and Bruce. He first became involved in gymnastics at school and at his local YMCA. He was later on the gymnastics team at Niles West High School, where he graduated in 1976.

He later attended the University of Oklahoma to work with coach Paul Ziert on the gymnastics team. He eventually graduated from OU in 1984, where he was an All-American and won the 1981 Nissen Award as America's best gymnast.

== Gymnastics career ==
He won the 1972 U.S. Junior National Championships when he was 14 and the U.S. Gymnastics Federation All-Around championship when he was 17, and was the youngest member of the Olympic team during the 1976 Summer Olympics. He also won a team all-around gold medal at the 1975 Pan American Games.

Although he qualified for the 1980 Summer Olympics, he was unable to participate due to the U.S. boycott against the Russian invasion of Afghanistan. Four years later, in the 1984 Summer Olympics, he won two gold medals for the team all-around and for the men's parallel bars. His win on the parallel bars helped the U.S. win its first men's Olympic gymnastic gold medal in 80 years. He demonstrated an original move called the "Conner spin" during the 1984 Olympics.

== Gymnastics commentator ==
Conner has been a play-by-play commentator for gymnastics since he was a competitor, when he began working as a network TV analyst on gymnastics meets where he was not a participant. In 2015, after over 30 years as a gymnastics commentator, Conner joined the SEC Network in its inaugural year of gymnastics coverage. He announces meets across ESPN platforms, including ABC, ESPN, SEC Network, and ACC Network.

== Awards and honors ==
Conner is a highly decorated gymnast who has won "medals at every level of national and international competition." Some of his honors include "induction into the USOC Olympic Hall of Fame (1991), the USA Gymnastics Hall of Fame (1996), Oklahoma Sports Hall of Fame (1997), and the International Gymnastics Hall of Fame (1997)." While Conner did not compete in the 1980 games, he was one of 461 athletes to receive a Congressional Gold Medal many years later.

== Personal life ==
On November 27, 1989, Nadia Comăneci, the famous Romanian gymnast Conner had met at the 1976 Montreal games, defected from Romania with a group of other Romanians. In January 1990, when Conner read in the newspaper that she was scheduled to be interviewed on The Pat Sajak Show, he contacted the producer and arranged to make a guest appearance on the show. Conner liked the idea of surprising Comăneci: "I'm thinking if she's going to be on Sajak, I might as well go out there and say, 'Hey, Nads,' " Actually, Comăneci was in an abusive relationship with the person who had led the escape group and who was acting as her current manager and promoter. Conner sensed her fear of this person and reached out to help. According to a 1996 New York Times article, "He helped make the connections that eventually led to her escape from that abusive relationship, and a new life in Montreal with a Romanian rugby coach and his family. For a year, they were phone pals."

Later in 1990, Conner interviewed her for ABC. A few months later, Conner was invited to her 29th birthday party, after which they developed a long-distance friendship. When a mutual friend died in an accident in 1991, Conner invited Comăneci to come to Oklahoma to help him run a gymnastics school. They were together for four years before they became engaged. On April 27, 1996, Conner and Comăneci were married in a ceremony in Bucharest that was televised live throughout Romania. Their wedding reception was held in the former presidential palace. Conner and Comăneci have one child, a son named Dylan Paul Conner who was born on June 3, 2006, in Oklahoma City, Oklahoma.

== Eponymous skills ==
Conner had one named element on the parallel bars, originally named in 1993, but removed from the code of points in 2000.

Gymnastics elements named after Bart Conner
Apparatus	Name	Description	Difficulty	Added to Code of Points
Parallel bars	Conner	"Straddle L-sit on one rail with 180° or 360° turn"	Removed from CoP on December 31, 2000.	1993

== Acting ==
He appeared as Bart Taylor in the 1986 film Rad and in 1984 as Richie Halberstrom in Season 1 Episode 7 (“One Fresh Batch of Lemonade: Part 2”) on the TV show “Highway to Heaven.”

== Books ==
- Conner, Bart with Paul Ziert. Winning the Gold. Warner Books, 1985.

== Cited sources ==
- Comăneci, Nadia (2004). Letters to a Young Gymnast. Art of Mentoring. Basic Books. ISBN 0-465-01276-0.
