= Kyoji Yamawaki =

Japanese gymnast (born 1957)

- Born: September 17, 1957 (age 68)

Gymnastics career
- Discipline: Men's artistic gymnastics
- Country represented: Japan
Medal record
Representing Japan
Olympic Games
Bronze medal – third place	1984 Los Angeles	Team competition
Asian Games
Bronze medal – third place	1986 Seoul	Team

Kyoji Yamawaki (山脇 恭二, Yamawaki Kyōji; born September 17, 1957) is a former Japanese gymnast. He invented and named the skill on Horizontal bar known as the Yamawaki. Yamawaki competed at the 1984 Summer Olympics and won the bronze medal in the team final. He also won a bronze medal in the still rings event at the 1985 world championships
