= Rocco Amboni =

Italian gymnast

- Full name: Rocco Roberto Amboni
- Born: 12 October 1959 (age 66) Treviolo, Italy
- Height: 1.67 m (5 ft 6 in)

Gymnastics career
- Discipline: Men's artistic gymnastics
- Country represented: Italy
- Club: Gruppo Sportivo Vigili del Fuoco "Giancarlo Brunetti" Roma
Medal record
Men's artistic gymnastics
Representing Italy
European Championships
Silver medal – second place	1981 Rome	Rings
Bronze medal – third place	1981 Rome	Vault

Rocco Roberto Amboni (born 12 October 1959) is an Italian gymnast. He competed in seven events at the 1984 Summer Olympics.
