= Warren Long =

Canadian gymnast

- Born: 16 April 1956 (age 70) Victoria, British Columbia, Canada

Gymnastics career
- Discipline: Men's artistic gymnastics
- Country represented: Canada

Warren Long (born 16 April 1956) is a Canadian gymnast. He competed in eight events at the 1984 Summer Olympics.
