= Chae Gwang-seok =

South Korean gymnast

- 채광석
- Alternative name: Chae Kwang-suk
- Born: 25 February 1962 (age 64)
- Height: 1.64 m (5 ft 5 in)

Gymnastics career
- Discipline: Men's artistic gymnastics
- Country represented: South Korea

Korean name
- Hangul: 채광석
- Hanja: 蔡廣錫
- RR: Chae Gwangseok
- MR: Ch'ae Kwangsŏk

Chae Gwang-seok (born 25 February 1962) is a South Korean gymnast. He competed in eight events at the 1984 Summer Olympics.
