= Jang Tae-eun =

South Korean gymnast

- 장태은
- Alternative name: Chang Tae-eun
- Born: 26 January 1964 (age 62)
- Height: 1.63 m (5 ft 4 in)

Gymnastics career
- Discipline: Men's artistic gymnastics
- Country represented: South Korea

Jang Tae-eun (born 26 January 1964) is a South Korean gymnast. He competed in eight events at the 1984 Summer Olympics.
