= Han Chung-sik =

South Korean gymnast

- 한충식
- Born: 25 May 1961 (age 65)
- Height: 1.65 m (5 ft 5 in)

Gymnastics career
- Discipline: Men's artistic gymnastics
- Country represented: South Korea
Medal record
Representing Republic of Korea
Asian Games
Silver medal – second place	1986 Seoul	Team

Han Chung-sik (born 25 May 1961) is a South Korean gymnast. He competed in eight events at the 1984 Summer Olympics.
