= Finn Gjertsen =

Norwegian artistic gymnast

- Born: 30 March 1959 (age 67) Sandefjord, Norway
- Height: 1.65 m (5 ft 5 in)

Gymnastics career
- Discipline: Men's artistic gymnastics
- Country represented: Norway
- Gym: Sandefjord Turn & Idrettsforening

Finn Gjertsen (born 30 March 1959) is a Norwegian artistic gymnast. He was born in Sandefjord. He competed at the 1984 Summer Olympics in Los Angeles. He won a total of five gold medals at Norwegian championships.
