= Brad Peters =

Canadian gymnast (born 1962)

- Full name: Bradley Peters
- Born: 2 December 1962 (age 63) Hamilton, Ontario, Canada

Gymnastics career
- Discipline: Men's artistic gymnastics
- Country represented: Canada

Bradley Peters (born 2 December 1962) is a Canadian gymnast. He competed at the 1984 Summer Olympics and the 1988 Summer Olympics.
