= Tony Piñeda =

Mexican gymnast (born 1964)

- Full name: Antonio Telésforo Piñeda
- Born: 5 January 1964 (age 62)
- Height: 1.58 m (5 ft 2 in)

Gymnastics career
- Discipline: Men's artistic gymnastics
- Country represented: Mexico
- College team: UCLA Bruins

Antonio Telésforo Piñeda (born 5 January 1964) is a Mexican gymnast. He competed at the 1984 Summer Olympics and the 1988 Summer Olympics.
