= Gerson Gnoatto =

Brazilian artistic gymnast (born 1963)

- Full name: Gerson Klippel Gnoatto
- Born: 8 October 1963 (age 62) Porto Alegre, Brazil
- Height: 174 cm (5 ft 9 in)

Gymnastics career
- Discipline: Men's artistic gymnastics
- Country represented: Brazil

Gerson Klippel Gnoatto (born 8 October 1963) is a Brazilian former artistic gymnast. He represented Brazil at the 1984 Summer Olympics in Los Angeles, competing in the men's individual all-around and six apparatus events.

== Early life ==
Gnoatto was born in Porto Alegre, Rio Grande do Sul. He began gymnastics at the age of seven at Grêmio Náutico União in Porto Alegre. He later competed for Minas Tênis Clube and ended his career at SOGIPA around 1987.

He was part of an early generation of Brazilian men's artistic gymnasts to compete internationally. Before the 1984 Olympics, he had been a national children's team champion, South American champion in 1982, placed 26th in the all-around at the 1983 Pan American Games in Caracas, and won the Brazilian interclub championship in 1984.

== Gymnastics career ==
At the 1984 Summer Olympics, Gnoatto placed 70th in the men's individual all-around. He also competed in floor exercise, vault, parallel bars, horizontal bar, rings, and pommel horse.

Gnoatto also represented Brazil at the World Artistic Gymnastics Championships, including the 1983 World Championships in Budapest and the 1987 World Championships in Rotterdam. In 1987, he won the Brazilian individual all-around title, as well as gold medals on horizontal bar and floor exercise, and silver medals on parallel bars and pommel horse.

At the 1987 Pan American Games in Indianapolis, he was a member of the Brazilian men's artistic gymnastics team that won the bronze medal in the team all-around. Individually, he placed ninth in the all-around and sixth on horizontal bar.

In 2019, Gnoatto was among a group of former Brazilian national team gymnasts from the 1980s who returned to compete at the Brazilian Championships as veteran athletes.
