= Eddie Van Hoof =

British gymnast (born 1956)

- Full name: Edmund Van Hoof
- Born: 22 August 1956 (age 70) Stainforth, South Yorkshire, England

Gymnastics career
- Discipline: Men's artistic gymnastics
- Country represented: (United Kingdom) Great Britain

Edmund Van Hoof (born 22 August 1956) is a British gymnast. He competed in eight events at the 1984 Summer Olympics.
