= Werner Birnbaum =

Australian gymnast

- Born: 9 August 1963 (age 63)

Gymnastics career
- Discipline: Men's artistic gymnastics
- Country represented: Australia

Werner Birnbaum (born 9 August 1963) is an Australian gymnast. He competed in seven events at the 1984 Summer Olympics.
