= Volker Rohrwick =

German gymnast

- Born: 16 July 1954 (age 72) Westhofen, West Germany
- Height: 1.72 m (5 ft 8 in)

Gymnastics career
- Discipline: Men's artistic gymnastics
- Country represented: West Germany
- Gym: Turnerbund 1889 Oppau

Volker Rohrwick (born 16 July 1954) is a German gymnast. He competed at the 1976 Summer Olympics and the 1984 Summer Olympics.
