= Jürgen Geiger =

German gymnast

- Born: 19 May 1959 (age 67) Herbolzheim, West Germany
- Height: 1.68 m (5 ft 6 in)

Gymnastics career
- Discipline: Men's artistic gymnastics
- Country represented: West Germany
- Gym: Turnverein Herbolzheim von 1902

Jürgen Geiger (born 19 May 1959) is a German gymnast. He competed in eight events at the 1984 Summer Olympics.
