= Daniel Gaudet =

Canadian artistic gymnast

- Born: 16 August 1959 (age 67) Moncton, New Brunswick, Canada
- Height: 160 cm (5 ft 3 in)

Gymnastics career
- Discipline: Men's artistic gymnastics
- Country represented: Canada

Daniel Gaudet (born August 16, 1959) is a Canadian former artistic gymnast. He competed at the 1984 Summer Olympics.

== Early life and education ==
Gaudet was born in Moncton, New Brunswick, raised in Toronto. He was educated at Agincourt Collegiate Institute and York University.

== Gymnastics career ==
Gaudet was a skilled gymnast. He competed for Canada in the 1984 Summer Olympics in Los Angeles, California, in the category of Artistic Gymnastics. He took part in all six events: Floor, Pommel Horse, Rings, Vault, Parallel Bars, and Horizontal Bar. He placed 9th in Rings. In Individual All-Around, he placed 33rd.

He was selected to the hall of fame in 2002. At the national finals, Gaudet collected 10 individual medals, including three all-around championships. At the OUAA Championships, he collected a total of 21 medals, including four all-around titles.

'A two-time national champion'

== Post-gymnastics career ==
Gaudet currently teaches mathematics at the United World College of South East Asia in Singapore. He previously taught at the American British Academy in Muscat. He is married (his wife is a teacher who used to work at the same school), and has two daughters.

== Olympic scoring ==
His scores were as below:

C/O	FX	PH	SR	VT	PB	HB	Total
Ia	9.700	9.450	9.700	9.650	9.250	9.600	57.350
Ib	9.650	9.100	9.850	9.550	9.500	9.600	57.250

Score: 114.600
