= Bernhard Simmelbauer =

German gymnast

- Born: 20 June 1963 (age 63) Mühldorf am Inn, West Germany
- Height: 1.70 m (5 ft 7 in)

Gymnastics career
- Discipline: Men's artistic gymnastics
- Country represented: West Germany
- Gym: Turn- und Sportverein 1860 Mühldorf

Bernhard Simmelbauer (born 20 June 1963) is a German gymnast. He competed at the 1984 Summer Olympics and the 1988 Summer Olympics.
