= Koji Sotomura =

Japanese gymnast

- 外村 康二
- Born: 23 January 1958 (age 68) Wakayama Prefecture, Japan
- Height: 1.64 m (5 ft 5 in)
- Relatives: Tetsuya Sotomura (son)

Gymnastics career
- Discipline: Men's artistic gymnastics
- Country represented: Japan
Medal record
Men's artistic gymnastics
Representing Japan
Olympic Games
Bronze medal – third place	1984 Los Angeles	Team
Bronze medal – third place	1984 Los Angeles	Floor
Asian Games
Bronze medal – third place	1986 Seoul	Team

Koji Sotomura (外村 康二, Sotomura Kōji; born 23 January 1958) is a Japanese former gymnast who won two bronze medals at the 1984 Summer Olympics.

His son Tetsuya Sotomura is a trampolinist and represents Japan at international competitions.
