= Rob Edmonds =

Australian gymnast

- Full name: Robert Edmonds
- Born: 12 May 1962 (age 64)
- Height: 159 cm (5 ft 3 in)

Gymnastics career
- Discipline: Men's artistic gymnastics
- Country represented: Australia

Robert Edmonds (born 12 May 1962) is an Australian gymnast. He competed in seven events at the 1984 Summer Olympics.
