= Valentin Pîntea =

Romanian gymnast

- Born: 19 April 1962 (age 64) Lugoj, Romanian People's Republic
- Height: 1.69 m (5 ft 7 in)

Gymnastics career
- Discipline: Men's artistic gymnastics
- Country represented: Romania
Medal record
European Championships
Bronze medal – third place	1985 Oslo	Rings

Valentin Pîntea (born 19 April 1962) is a Romanian gymnast. He competed at the 1984 Summer Olympics and the 1988 Summer Olympics.
