= Marco Piatti =

Swiss gymnast

- Born: 15 August 1958 (age 68)
- Height: 1.70 m (5 ft 7 in)

Gymnastics career
- Discipline: Men's artistic gymnastics
- Country represented: Switzerland

Marco Piatti (born 15 August 1958) is a Swiss gymnast. He competed in eight events at the 1984 Summer Olympics.
