= Noritoshi Hirata =

Japanese gymnast (born 1958)

- 平田 倫敏
- Born: 1 March 1958 (age 68) Onomichi, Japan
- Height: 1.70 m (5 ft 7 in)

Gymnastics career
- Discipline: Men's artistic gymnastics
- Country represented: Japan
Medal record
Men's artistic gymnastics
Representing Japan
Olympic Games
Bronze medal – third place	1984 Los Angeles	Team
Asian Games
Gold medal – first place	1982 New Delhi	Horizontal Bar
Silver medal – second place	1982 New Delhi	Team

Noritoshi Hirata (平田 倫敏, Hirata Noritoshi; born 1 March 1958) is a Japanese former gymnast who competed in the 1984 Summer Olympics.
