= Alfonso Rodríguez (gymnast) =

Spanish gymnast

- Full name: Alfonso Rodríguez de Sadia Lombardero
- Born: 23 December 1965 (age 60) Madrid, Spain
- Height: 1.74 m (5 ft 9 in)

Gymnastics career
- Discipline: Men's artistic gymnastics
- Country represented: Spain

Alfonso Rodríguez de Sadia Lombardero (born 23 December 1965) is a Spanish gymnast. He competed at the 1984 Summer Olympics, the 1988 Summer Olympics and the 1992 Summer Olympics.
