= Laurent Barbiéri =

French gymnast

- Born: 30 October 1960 (age 65)
- Height: 1.67 m (5 ft 6 in)

Gymnastics career
- Discipline: Men's artistic gymnastics
- Country represented: France
Medal record
Representing France
European Championships
Bronze medal – third place	1985 Oslo	Floor exercise

Laurent Barbiéri (born 30 October 1960) is a French gymnast. He competed in eight events at the 1984 Summer Olympics.
