= Benno Groß =

German gymnast

- Born: 9 October 1957 (age 68) Saarlouis, West Germany

Gymnastics career
- Discipline: Men's artistic gymnastics
- Country represented: West Germany
- Gym: Turngemeinschaft Saar, Turnverein 1904 Lebach

Benno Groß (born 9 October 1957) is a German gymnast. He competed in eight events at the 1984 Summer Olympics.
