= Allan Reddon =

Canadian gymnast

- Born: 20 May 1962 (age 64) Edmonton, Alberta, Canada

Gymnastics career
- Discipline: Men's artistic gymnastics
- Country represented: Canada

Allan Reddon (born 20 May 1962) is a Canadian gymnast. He competed in eight events at the 1984 Summer Olympics.
