= Bruno Cavelti =

Swiss gymnast

- Born: 21 January 1961 (age 65)
- Height: 1.66 m (5 ft 5 in)

Gymnastics career
- Discipline: Men's artistic gymnastics
- Country represented: Switzerland

Bruno Cavelti (born 21 January 1961) is a Swiss gymnast. He competed at the 1984 Summer Olympics and the 1988 Summer Olympics.
