= Joo Young-sam =

South Korean gymnast

- 주영삼
- Alternative name: Ju Yeong-sam
- Born: 25 March 1966 (age 60)
- Height: 1.65 m (5 ft 5 in)

Gymnastics career
- Discipline: Men's artistic gymnastics
- Country represented: South Korea
Medal record
Representing Republic of Korea
Asian Games
Silver medal – second place	1986 Seoul	Team
Bronze medal – third place	1986 Seoul	Pommel Horse

Joo Young-sam (born 25 March 1966) is a South Korean gymnast. He competed at the 1984 Summer Olympics and the 1988 Summer Olympics.
