= Carl Beynon =

British gymnast (born 1964)

Carl Benyon
- Born: Carl Richard Benyon; 30 June 1964 (age 62) Newport, Wales

Gymnastics career
- Discipline: Men's artistic gymnastics
- Country represented: (United Kingdom) Great Britain

Carl Richard Beynon (born 1964) is a former Welsh gymnast and British Olympian. He represented the United Kingdom at the European Championships, the World Championships and the 1984 Summer Olympics in Los Angeles.

== Early life and education ==
Beynon was born in Gwent, Wales on 30 June 1964, the son of Mr & Mrs. Colin Beynon. He attended Olchfa Comprehensive School in Swansea.

== Gymnastics career ==
In 1982, aged 17, he represented Great Britain at the 3rd European Junior Championships in Ankara, Turkey. However, Beynon only managed a 32nd place finish.

Beynon represented Britain at the 1984 Summer Olympics where he competed in eight events.

For much of the 1980s, Beynon was Britain's no. 2 male gymnast behind his Swansea and British teammate, Andrew Morris. In 1986, Beynon had a chance to win the Gold Top Champions Cup, when his long-term rival, Morris, fell from the horizontal bar. However, Beynon failed to seize his opportunity when he took a tumble of his own. In 1987, Beynon succeeded in winning the Gold Top Champions Cup at the Albert Hall.

In 1988, he won gold in the rings at the British national championships.

Beynon was bound for the 1990 Commonwealth Games when doctors discovered a lump in his stomach, and he had to drop out to obtain treatment. Later that year, he married fiancée and fellow gymnast, Joanne Higginson.
