= Andreas Japtok =

German gymnast

- Born: 13 September 1960 (age 65) Bartolfelde, West Germany
- Height: 1.73 m (5 ft 8 in)

Gymnastics career
- Discipline: Men's artistic gymnastics
- Country represented: West Germany
- Gym: Verein für Leibesübungen von 1848 Hannover

Andreas Japtok (born 13 September 1960) is a German gymnast. He competed in eight events at the 1984 Summer Olympics.
