= Diego Lazzarich =

Italian gymnast

- Born: 25 October 1961 (age 64) Mirano, Italy
- Height: 1.71 m (5 ft 7 in)

Gymnastics career
- Discipline: Men's artistic gymnastics
- Country represented: Italy

Diego Lazzarich (born 25 October 1961) is an Italian gymnast. He competed in seven events at the 1984 Summer Olympics.
