= Andrew Morris (gymnast) =

British gymnast (born 1961)

- Full name: Andrew J. Morris
- Born: 30 November 1961 (age 64) Swansea, Wales

Gymnastics career
- Discipline: Men's artistic gymnastics
- Country represented: (United Kingdom) Great Britain

Andrew J. Morris (born 30 November 1961) is a British gymnast. He competed at the 1984 Summer Olympics and the 1988 Summer Olympics.
