= Urs Meister =

Swiss gymnast

- Born: 19 April 1958 (age 68)
- Height: 1.64 m (5 ft 5 in)

Gymnastics career
- Discipline: Men's artistic gymnastics
- Country represented: Switzerland

Urs Meister (born 19 April 1958) is a Swiss gymnast. He competed in eight events at the 1984 Summer Olympics.
