= Maurizio Zonzini =

Sammarinese gymnast (born 1962)

- Born: 20 March 1962 (age 64) San Marino
- Height: 1.68 m (5 ft 6 in)

Gymnastics career
- Discipline: Men's artistic gymnastics
- Country represented: San Marino

Maurizio Zonzini (born 20 March 1962) is a Sammarinese gymnast. He competed in seven events at the 1984 Summer Olympics. Zonzini was the flag bearer for San Marino in the 1984 Summer Olympics opening ceremony.
