= Miguel Soler (gymnast) =

Spanish gymnast (born 1960)

- Full name: Miguel Soler Escudero
- Alternative name: Miquel Soler i Escudero
- Born: 6 June 1960 (age 66) Barcelona, Spain
- Height: 1.74 m (5 ft 9 in)

Gymnastics career
- Discipline: Men's artistic gymnastics
- Country represented: Spain
- Gym: La Salle Gràcia

Miguel Soler Escudero (born 6 June 1960) is a Spanish gymnast. He competed in seven events at the 1984 Summer Olympics.
