= Philippe Chartrand =

Canadian gymnast

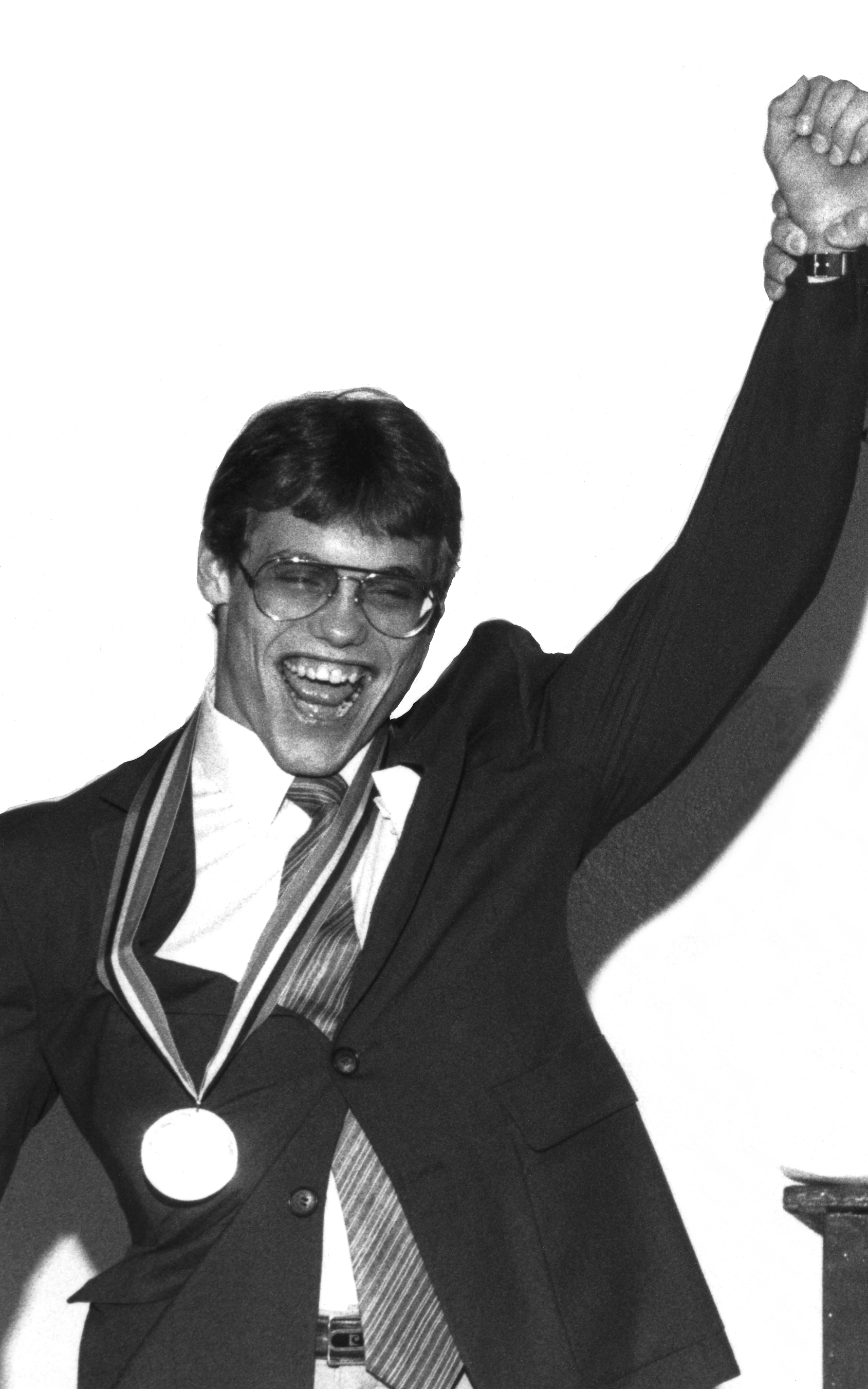

Personal information
- Born: 23 December 1963 (age 62) Laval, Quebec, Canada

Gymnastics career
- Discipline: Men's artistic gymnastics
- Country represented: Canada

Philippe Chartrand (born 23 December 1963) is a Canadian gymnast. He competed at the 1984 Summer Olympics and the 1988 Summer Olympics.
