= Terry Bartlett =

English gymnast (born 1963)

- Born: 2 December 1963 (age 62) Southampton, Hampshire, England

Gymnastics career
- Discipline: Men's artistic gymnastics
- Country represented: (United Kingdom) Great Britain England
- College team: Penn State Nittany Lions
- Club: Southampton Amateur Gymnastics Club
Medal record
Gymnastics
Representing England
Commonwealth Games
Silver medal – second place	1990 Auckland	team

Terence "Terry" J. Bartlett (born 2 December 1963) is a male retired English gymnast.

== Gymnastics career ==
Bartlett was educated at The Mountbatten School And Language College in Romsey, Hampshire. At the age of 17, Bartlett moved to the United States, where, after graduating, he was offered a scholarship to Pennsylvania State University, majoring in physical education and business. He competed for Great Britain at the Olympic Games in 1984, 1988, and 1992, captaining the gymnastics team at the latter event.

He represented England and won a silver medal in the team event, at the 1990 Commonwealth Games in Auckland, New Zealand.

== Post-gymnastics career ==
He has since been performing with the Canadian circus troupe Cirque du Soleil. He trained Charlize Theron for her part in the movie Æon Flux, and is a former boyfriend of Gabby Logan's sister.

== See also ==
- List of Pennsylvania State University Olympians
