= Nam Seung-gu =

South Korean gymnast

- 남승구
- Alternative name: Nam Seoung-gu
- Born: 25 November 1963 (age 62)
- Height: 1.68 m (5 ft 6 in)

Gymnastics career
- Discipline: Men's artistic gymnastics
- Country represented: South Korea

Nam Seung-gu (born 25 November 1963) is a South Korean gymnast. He competed in eight events at the 1984 Summer Olympics.
