= Philippe Vatuone =

French gymnast

- Full name: Philippe Louis Michel Vatuone
- Born: 13 April 1962 (age 64) Sète, France
- Height: 1.70 m (5 ft 7 in)

Gymnastics career
- Discipline: Men's artistic gymnastics
- Country represented: France
- Gym: Salle Vincent Ferrari
Medal record
Men's artistic gymnastics
Representing France
Olympic Games
Bronze medal – third place	1984 Los Angeles	Floor exercise
World Championships
Silver medal – second place	1983 Budapest	Horizontal bar
European Championships
Silver medal – second place	1985 Oslo	Floor exercise
Bronze medal – third place	1983 Varna	Floor exercise
Bronze medal – third place	1983 Varna	Horizontal bar

Philippe Louis Michel Vatuone (born 13 April 1962) is a French former gymnast who competed in the 1984 Summer Olympics.He also won a silver medal at the 1983 World Artistic Gymnastics Championships on the horizontal bar.
