= Frank Nutzenberger =

Canadian gymnast

- Born: 6 June 1959 (age 67) Toronto, Ontario, Canada

Gymnastics career
- Discipline: Men's artistic gymnastics
- Country represented: Canada

Frank Nutzenberger (born 6 June 1959) is a Canadian gymnast. He competed in eight events at the 1984 Summer Olympics.
