= Jacques Def =

French gymnast

- Born: 11 November 1962 (age 63)
- Height: 1.70 m (5 ft 7 in)

Gymnastics career
- Discipline: Men's artistic gymnastics
- Country represented: France

Jacques Def (born 11 November 1962) is a French gymnast. He competed in eight events at the 1984 Summer Olympics.
