= Jean-Luc Cairon =

French gymnast (1962–2022)

- Cairon's 2021 Mugshot

Personal information
- Born: 14 February 1962 Forbach, France
- Died: 26 February 2022 (aged 60) Tulsa, Oklahoma, US
- Height: 1.79 m (5 ft 10 in)

Gymnastics career
- Discipline: Men's artistic gymnastics
- Country represented: France
- Club: Forbach
Medal record
Men's artistic gymnastics
Representing France
Mediterranean Games
Gold medal – first place	1983 Casablanca	Team
Gold medal – first place	1983 Casablanca	Pommel horse
Gold medal – first place	1983 Casablanca	Parallel bars
Silver medal – second place	1983 Casablanca	All-around
Silver medal – second place	1983 Casablanca	Horizontal bar

Jean-Luc Cairon (14 February 1962 – 26 February 2022) was a French gymnast and coach.

Cairon was born in Forbach, France. He competed for his native France in eight events at the 1984 Summer Olympics.

Cairon was a co-owner and coach at now-defunct Krafft Academy in Tulsa, Oklahoma. He coached for over three years at South Country Gymnastics in Jenks, Oklahoma, and was an assistant women's gymnastics coach at Arizona State University.

In 2021, four athletes alleged Cairon had groomed them and touched them inappropriately, resulting in a report to the United States Center for SafeSport. Cairon was then arrested, released on bail, showed intent to flee the court's jurisdiction by leaving the United States, and was sentenced to 25 years for each count in prison upon a guilty plea. On 26 February 2022, Cairon died in prison while serving out his sentence, at the age of 60.
