= Antonio Fraguas =

Spanish gymnast

- Full name: Antonio Fraguas Castany
- Alternative name: Antoni Fraguas i Castany
- Born: 19 December 1963 (age 62) Girona, Spain
- Height: 1.67 m (5 ft 6 in)

Gymnastics career
- Discipline: Men's artistic gymnastics
- Country represented: Spain
- Club: Club Natació Granollers

Antonio Fraguas Castany (born 19 December 1963) is a Spanish gymnast. He competed in seven events at the 1984 Summer Olympics.
