= Daniel Wunderlin =

Swiss gymnast

- Born: 18 May 1960 (age 66)
- Height: 1.74 m (5 ft 9 in)

Gymnastics career
- Discipline: Men's artistic gymnastics
- Country represented: Switzerland

Daniel Wunderlin (born 18 May 1960) is a Swiss gymnast. He competed in eight events at the 1984 Summer Olympics.
