= Vittorio Allievi =

Italian gymnast

- Born: 10 December 1962 (age 63) Seregno, Italy
- Height: 1.75 m (5 ft 9 in)

Gymnastics career
- Discipline: Men's artistic gymnastics
- Country represented: Italy
- Club: Gruppo Sportivo "Carlo Galimberti" Vigili del Fuoco

Vittorio Allievi (born 10 December 1962) is an Italian gymnast. He competed at the 1984 Summer Olympics and the 1988 Summer Olympics.
