= Emilian Nicula =

Romanian gymnast (born 1963)

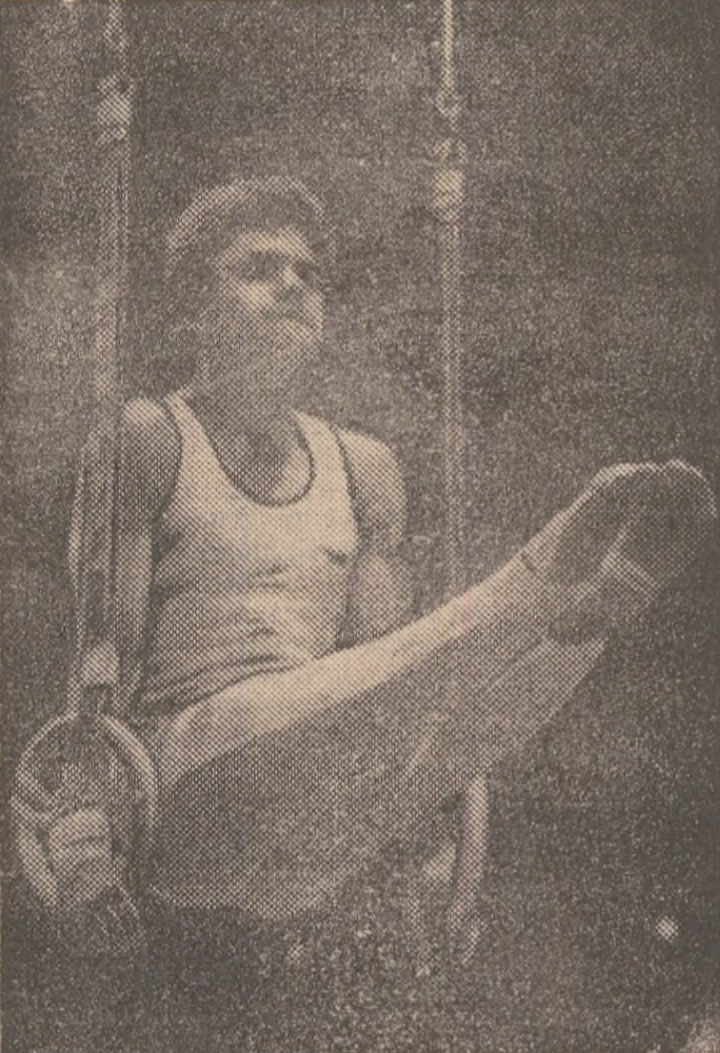

Personal information
- Born: 29 May 1963 (age 63) Bucharest, Romanian People's Republic
- Height: 1.60 m (5 ft 3 in)

Gymnastics career
- Discipline: Men's artistic gymnastics
- Country represented: Romania

Emilian Necula (born 29 May 1963) is a Romanian gymnast. He competed in seven events at the 1984 Summer Olympics.
