= Johan Jonasson =

Swedish gymnast (born 1966)

- Full name: Johan Arne Jonasson
- Born: 9 October 1966 (age 59) Stockholm, Sweden
- Height: 1.70 m (5 ft 7 in)

Gymnastics career
- Discipline: Men's artistic gymnastics
- Country represented: Sweden
- Gym: Brommagymnasterna

Johan Arne Jonasson (born 9 October 1966) is a Swedish gymnast. He competed at the 1984 Summer Olympics, the 1988 Summer Olympics and the 1992 Summer Olympics.
