= Markus Lehmann =

Swiss gymnast

- Born: 9 March 1960 (age 66)
- Height: 1.55 m (5 ft 1 in)

Gymnastics career
- Discipline: Men's artistic gymnastics
- Country represented: Switzerland

Markus Lehmann (born 9 March 1960) is a Swiss gymnast. He competed in eight events at the 1984 Summer Olympics.
