= Bulgaria at the 1988 Summer Olympics =

- Flag of Bulgaria
- IOC code: BUL
- NOC: Bulgarian Olympic Committee

in Seoul
- Competitors: 171 in 16 sports
- Flag bearer: Vasil Etropolski
- Medals Ranked 7th: Gold 10 Silver 12 Bronze 13 Total 35

Summer Olympics appearances (overview)
- 1896; 1900–1920; 1924; 1928; 1932; 1936; 1948; 1952; 1956; 1960; 1964; 1968; 1972; 1976; 1980; 1984; 1988; 1992; 1996; 2000; 2004; 2008; 2012; 2016; 2020; 2024; 2028

Bulgaria competed at the 1988 Summer Olympics in Seoul, South Korea. Bulgaria ranked 5th overall by medal count with 35 medals won. 171 competitors, 104 men and 67 women, took part in 120 events in 16 sports. The nation returned to the Olympic Games after being forced to boycott the 1984 Summer Olympics.

== Medalists ==
Medal	Name	Sport	Event	Date
Gold	Sevdalin Marinov	Weightlifting	Men's 52 kg	18 September
Gold	Atanas Komshev	Wrestling	Men's Greco-Roman 90 kg	20 September
Gold	Borislav Gidikov	Weightlifting	Men's 75 kg	22 September
Gold	Tanya Dangalakova	Swimming	Women's 100 metre breaststroke	23 September
Gold	Lubomir Geraskov	Gymnastics	Men's pommel horse	24 September
Gold	Tanyu Kiryakov	Shooting	Men's 10 metre air pistol	24 September
Gold	Hristo Markov	Athletics	Men's triple jump	24 September
Gold	Vanya Gesheva	Canoeing	Women's K-1 500 metres	30 September
Gold	Yordanka Donkova	Athletics	Women's 100 metres hurdles	30 September
Gold	Ivaylo Hristov	Boxing	Light flyweight	1 October
Silver	Zhivko Vangelov	Wrestling	Men's Greco-Roman 62 kg	20 September
Silver	Stefan Topurov	Weightlifting	Men's 60 kg	20 September
Silver	Vesela Lecheva	Shooting	Women's 50 metre rifle three positions	21 September
Silver	Rangel Gerovski	Wrestling	Men's Greco-Roman 130 kg	21 September
Silver	Stoyan Balov	Wrestling	Men's Greco-Roman 57 kg	22 September
Silver	Antoaneta Frenkeva	Swimming	Women's 100 metre breaststroke	23 September
Silver	Lalka Berberova; Radka Stoyanova	Rowing	Women's coxless pair	24 September
Silver	Ivan Tsonov	Wrestling	Men's freestyle 48 kg	29 September
Silver	Vanya Gesheva; Diana Paliyska	Canoeing	Women's K-2 500 metres	30 September
Silver	Stefka Kostadinova	Athletics	Women's high jump	30 September
Silver	Adriana Dunavska	Gymnastics	Women's rhythmic individual all-around	30 September
Silver	Aleksandar Hristov	Boxing	Bantamweight	1 October
Bronze	Bratan Tsenov	Wrestling	Men's Greco-Roman 48 kg	20 September
Bronze	Antoaneta Frenkeva	Swimming	Women's 200 metre breaststroke	21 September
Bronze	Aleksandar Varbanov	Weightlifting	Men's 75 kg	22 September
Bronze	Stefka Madina; Violeta Ninova	Rowing	Women's double sculls	24 September
Bronze	Magdalena Georgieva	Rowing	Women's single sculls	25 September
Bronze	Diana Dudeva	Gymnastics	Women's floor	25 September
Bronze	Tsvetanka Hristova	Athletics	Women's discus throw	29 September
Bronze	Manuela Maleeva	Tennis	Women's singles	29 September
Bronze	Simeon Shterev	Wrestling	Men's freestyle 62 kg	29 September
Bronze	Martin Marinov	Canoeing	Men's C-1 500 metres	30 September
Bronze	Rahmat Sofiadi	Wrestling	Men's freestyle 74 kg	30 September
Bronze	Nikolay Buhalov	Canoeing	Men's C-1 1000 metres	1 October
Bronze	Vanya Gesheva; Borislava Ivanova; Diana Paliyska; Ognyana Petrova	Canoeing	Women's K-4 500 metres	1 October

== Competitors ==
The following is the list of number of competitors in the Games.

Sport	Men	Women	Total
Athletics	10	12	22
Basketball	0	12	12
Boxing	11	–	11
Canoeing	8	4	12
Fencing	5	0	5
Gymnastics	6	8	14
Judo	5	–	5
Rowing	14	21	35
Shooting	4	2	6
Swimming	2	6	8
Table tennis	1	1	2
Tennis	0	2	2
Volleyball	12	0	12
Weightlifting	6	–	6
Wrestling	20	–	20
Total	104	68	172

== Athletics ==
Men
Track & road events

Athlete	Event	Heat		Quarterfinal		Semifinal		Final	
Athlete	Event	Result	Rank	Result	Rank	Result	Rank	Result	Rank
Evgeni Ignatov	5000 m	13:43.42	5 Q	—N/a		13:24.76	6 Q	13:26.41	8
Evgeni Ignatov	10000 m	28:15.63	5 Q	—N/a				28:09.32	12
Lyubomir Ivanov	20 km walk	—N/a						1:28:43	43
Toma Tomov	400 m hurdles	49.66	4 q	—N/a		48.90	5	did not advance	

Field events

Athlete	Event	Qualification		Final	
Athlete	Event	Distance	Position	Distance	Position
Viktor Apostolov	Hammer throw	71.10	20	did not advance	
Gueorgui Gueorguiev	Discus throw	61.34	12 q	61.24	11
Khristo Markov	Triple jump	16.91	4 Q	17.61	Gold medal
Plamen Minev	Hammer throw	74.46	14	did not advance	
Ivan Tanev	Hammer throw	76.24	9 q	76.08	8
Atanas Tarev	Pole vault	NM		did not advance	
Gueorgui Todorov	Shot put	19.68	13	did not advance	

Women
Track & road events

Athlete	Event	Heat		Quarterfinal		Semifinal		Final	
Athlete	Event	Result	Rank	Result	Rank	Result	Rank	Result	Rank
Yordanka Donkova	100 m hurdles	12.89	4 Q	12.47	1 Q	12.58	1 Q	12.38 OR	Gold medal
Nadezhda Georgieva	200 m	22.80	3 Q	22.60	7 Q	22.67	5	did not advance	
Anelia Nuneva	100 m	11.09	1 Q	10.96	1 Q	11.00	2 Q	11.49	8
Ginka Zagorcheva	100 m hurdles	DNF		did not advance					
Tsvetanka Ilieva; Valya Demireva-Valova; Nadezhda Georgieva; Yordanka Donkova	4 × 100 m relay	43.92	4 Q	—N/a		43.07	3 Q	43.02	5

Field events

Athlete	Event	Qualification		Final	
Athlete	Event	Distance	Position	Distance	Position
Lyudmila Andonova	High jump	1.92	8 Q	1.93	5
Tsvetanka Khristova	Discus throw	65.92	4 Q	69.74	Bronze medal
Stefka Kostadinova	High jump	1.92	8 Q	2.01	Silver medal
Svetla Mitkova	Discus throw	64.68	6 Q	69.14	4
Svetla Mitkova	Shot Put	19.53	10 Q	19.09	10
Antoaneta Selenska	Javelin throw	64.60	4 Q	56.78	11

Combined events – Heptathlon

Athlete	Event	100H	HJ	SP	200 m	LJ	JT	800 m	Final	Rank
Svetla Dimitrova	Result	13.24	1.80	12.02	23.49	6.19	37.62	2:15.73	6171	12
Svetla Dimitrova	Points	1089	978	662	1030	908	622	882	6171	12

== Basketball ==
=== Women's tournament ===
Team roster

The following is the Bulgaria roster in the women's basketball tournament of the 1988 Summer Olympics.

Bulgaria women's national basketball team – 1988 Summer Olympics roster
Players
Coaches

Pos.	No.	Name	Age – Date of birth	Height	Club	Ctr.
	4	Nina Khadzhiyankova	25 – 18 September 1963			(France)
	5	Larisa Spasova	28 – 22 August 1960			(Bulgaria)
	6	Mariana Naydenova	26 – 11 February 1962
	7	Tsonka Vaysilova	21 – 20 February 1967			(Bulgaria)
	8	Vanya Dermendzhieva	29 – 3 December 1958			(West Germany)
	9	Sonya Dragomirova	27 – 7 September 1961			(Bulgaria)
	10	Radmila Vasileva	24 – 5 January 1964			(Bulgaria)
	11	Kostadinka Radkova	26 – 27 June 1962			(France)
	12	Evladiya Slavcheva-Stefanova	26 – 25 February 1962			(Bulgaria)
	13	Madlena Staneva	25 – 1 June 1963			(France)
C	14	Polina Tzekova	20 – 30 April 1968	1.95 m (6 ft 5 in)	WBC Lokomotiv Sofia	(Bulgaria)
	15	Mariana Chobanova	23 – 13 September 1965			(Portugal)

Legend

- Club – describes last
  club before the tournament
- Age – describes age
  on 17 September 1988

Group play

Pos	Team	Pld	W	L	PF	PA	PD	Pts	Qualification
1	Australia	3	2	1	178	196	−18	5 (Note: Head-to-head record: Australia 1–0 Soviet Union)	Semifinals
2	Soviet Union	3	2	1	208	188	+20	5	Semifinals
3	Bulgaria	3	1	2	217	241	−24	4 (Note: Head-to-head record: Bulgaria 1–0 South Korea)	Classification round
4	South Korea (H)	3	1	2	244	222	+22	4	Classification round

Source: FIBA
Rules for classification: 1) points; 2) head-to-head points; 3) head-to-head goal average; 4) head-to-head number of points scored.
(H) Hosts
Notes:

19 September 1988
11:45

Boxscore

Bulgaria	62–91	Soviet Union
Scoring by half: 26–50, 36–41
Pts: Dermendzhieva, Staneva 17; Rebs: Staneva 6 Asts: Slavcheva 3		Pts: Zasulskaya 23; Rebs: Yakovleva, Zasulskaya 10; Asts: Minkh 4

Jamsil Gymnasium, Seoul

22 September 1988
19:30

Boxscore

Australia	63–57	Bulgaria
Scoring by half: 31–30, 32–27
Pts: Maher 20; Rebs: Maher 9 Asts: Timms 3		Pts: Slavcheva 15; Rebs: Slavcheva 6 Asts: Slavcheva 2

Jamsil Gymnasium, Seoul

25 September 1988
19:30

Boxscore

Bulgaria	98–87	South Korea
Scoring by half: 48–51, 50–36
Pts: Slavcheva 39; Rebs: Slavcheva 8 Asts: Kostourkova 3		Pts: Choi 26; Rebs: Choi, Sung 7 Asts: 5 players 1

Jamsil Gymnasium, Seoul

Classification 5–8

27 September 1988
19:30

Boxscore

Bulgaria	81–78	Czechoslovakia
Scoring by half: 49–42, 32–36
Pts: Radkova 25; Rebs: Radkova 6 Asts: Khadzhiyankova, Slavcheva 3		Pts: Janoštinová 27; Rebs: Dobrovičová 9 Asts: Kysilková, Nováková 3

Jamsil Gymnasium, Seoul

Classification 5/6

29 September 1988
9:45

Boxscore

Bulgaria	102–74	China
Scoring by half: 53–19, 49–55
Pts: Slavcheva 22; Rebs: Staneva 8 Asts: Radkova 2		Pts: Zheng 23; Rebs: Cong, Peng 5 Asts: Cong, Liu, Xue 1

Jamsil Gymnasium, Seoul

== Boxing ==
Men

Athlete	Event	1 Round	2 Round	3 Round	Quarterfinals	Semifinals	Final	
Athlete	Event	Opposition Result	Opposition Result	Opposition Result	Opposition Result	Opposition Result	Rank	
Ivailo Marinov	Light Flyweight	BYE	Mark Epton (GBR); W 5–0	Henry Martínez (ESA); W 5–0	Alexander Makhmutov (URS); W 5–0	Leopoldo Serrantes (PHI); W 5–0	Michael Carbajal (USA); W 5–0	Gold medal
Serafim Todorov	Flyweight	David Griman (VEN); W 4–1	Setsuo Segawa (JPN); W 5–0	Gamal El-Komy (EGY); W WO	Kim Kwang-Sun (KOR); L 1–4	did not advance		
Aleksandar Khristov	Bantamweight	Peter Anok (SUD); W 4–1	Byun Jung-Il (KOR); W 4–1	Jimmy Majanya (SWE); W 5–0	Alexander Artemev (URS); W 3–2	Jorge Julio Rocha (COL); W 3–2	Kennedy McKinney (USA); L 0–5	Silver medal
Kirkor Kirkorov	Featherweight	Diego Drumm (GDR); W 5–0	Jamie Pagendam (CAN); W WO	Lee Jae-Hyuk (KOR); L 0–5	did not advance			
Emil Chuprenski	Lightweight	BYE	Eduardo de la Peña (GUA); W 5–0	Mark Kennedy (JAM); W 5–0	Romallis Ellis (USA); L 2–3	did not advance		
Borislav Abadzhiev	Light Welterweight	Vukasin Dobrasinovic (YUG); L 2–3	did not advance					
Khristo Furnigov	Welterweight	BYE	Gregory Griffiths (BAR); W	Abdoukerim Hamidou (TOG); W 5–0	Robert Wangila (KEN); L 0–5	did not advance		
Angel Stoyanov	Light Middleweight	BYE	Torsten Schmitz (GDR); L 2–3	did not advance				
Deyan Kirilov	Light Heavyweight	Damir Škaro (YUG); L 2–3	did not advance					
Svilen Rusinov	Heavyweight	BYE	Andrzej Golota (POL); L 0–5	did not advance				
Petar Stoimenov	Super Heavyweight	BYE	Peter Hrivnák (TCH); L RSC-2	did not advance				

== Canoeing ==
=== Sprint ===
Men

Athlete	Event	Heats		Repechages		Semifinals		Final	
Athlete	Event	Time	Rank	Time	Rank	Time	Rank	Time	Rank
Martin Marinov	C-1 500 m	1:52.74	2 Q	BYE		1:55.61	1 Q	1:57.27	Bronze medal
Nikolay Bukhalov	C-1 1000 m	4:09.57	3 Q	BYE		4:07.23	2 Q	4:18.94	Bronze medal
Deyan Bonev; Petar Bozhilov	C-2 500 m	1:44.53	1 Q	BYE		1:48.60	3 Q	1:44.32	4
Deyan Bonev; Petar Bozhilov	C-2 1000 m	4:01.42	5 Q	4:06.91	2 Q	3:54.98	3 Q	4:11.62	9
Nikolay Yordanov; Petar Godev; Borislav Tsvetkov; Ivan Marinov	K-4 1000 m	3:15.00	6 Q	3:09.30	2 Q	3:11.56	4	did not advance	

Women

Athlete	Event	Heats		Repechages		Semifinals		Final	
Athlete	Event	Time	Rank	Time	Rank	Time	Rank	Time	Rank
Vanja Gesheva	K-1 500 m	1:55.44	1 Q	—N/a		1:56.26	2 Q	1:55.19	Gold medal
Vanja Gesheva; Diana Paliiska	K-2 500 m	1:44.52	1 Q	BYE		1:52.48	2 Q	1:44.06	Silver medal
Vanja Gesheva; Diana Paliiska; Ogniana Petkova; Borislava Ivanova	K-4 500 m	1:39.40	2 Q	—N/a		BYE		1:42.63	Bronze medal

== Fencing ==
Five fencers, all men, represented Bulgaria in 1988.

=== Men ===
==== Individual ====
Athlete	Event	Elimination Round	Round I	Repechage Round I	Round II	Repechage Round II	Round III	Repechage Round III	Round IV	Quarterfinal	Semifinal	Final / BM	
Athlete	Event	Opposition Score	Opposition Score	Opposition Score	Opposition Score	Opposition Score	Opposition Score	Opposition Score	Opposition Score	Opposition Score	Opposition Score	Opposition Score	Rank
Khristo Etropolski	Individual sabre	Q									did not advance		
Vasil Etropolski	Individual sabre	Q									did not advance		
Nikolay Marincheshki	Individual sabre		did not advance										

==== Team ====
Athlete	Event	Elimination Round	1/16	Quarterfinal	Semifinal	Final / BM	
Athlete	Event	Opposition Score	Opposition Score	Opposition Score	Opposition Score	Opposition Score	Rank
Khristo Etropolski; Vasil Etropolski; Nikolay Marincheshki; Nikolay Mateev; Georgi Chomakov	Team sabre	Hungary; L 2–9; France; L 3–9	—N/a				8

== Gymnastics ==
=== Artistic ===
Men

Athlete	Event	Qualification								Final							
Athlete	Event	Apparatus						Total	Rank	Apparatus						Total	Rank
Athlete	Event	F	PH	R	V	PB	HB	Total	Rank	F	PH	R	V	PB	HB	Total	Rank
Petar Gueorguiev	All-around	18.95	19.55	19.35	19.30	19.50	18.95	115.60	39	did not advance							
Stoyko Gochev	All-around	19.20	19.10	19.55	18.90	19.65	19.55	115.95	36	did not advance							
Lyubomir Gueraskov	All-around	19.50	19.90	19.70	19.15	19.40	19.10	116.75	21 Q	9.550	9.900	9.800	9.500	9.700	9.800	116.625	23
Kalofer Hristozov	All-around	19.80	19.55	19.80	19.30	19.75	19.50	117.70	6 Q	9.800	9.900	9.900	9.650	9.850	9.800	117.750	6
Deyan Kolev	All-around	19.45	19.00	19.65	19.65	19.35	19.20	116.30	30	did not advance							
Dimitar Taskov	All-around	19.50	19.65	19.45	19.45	19.25	19.45	116.75	21 Q	9.550	9.800	9.750	9.850	9.900	9.900	117.125	20
Kalofer Hristozov; Lyubomir Gueraskov; Deyan Kolev; Dimitar Taskov; Stoyko Gochev; Petar Gueorguiev	Team all-around	—N/a								97.45	97.90	98.15	96.90	97.85	96.85	585.100	5

Individual finals

Athlete	Event	Apparatus						Total	Rank
Athlete	Event	F	PH	R	V	PB	HB	Total	Rank
Lyubomir Gueraskov	Pommel horse	—N/a	19.950	—N/a				19.950	Gold medal
Kalofer Hristozov	Floor	19.750	—N/a					19.750	7
Kalofer Hristozov	Rings	—N/a		19.825	—N/a			19.825	4
Kalofer Hristozov	Parallel bars	—N/a				19.725	—N/a	19.725	4
Deyan Kolev	Vault	—N/a			19.737	—N/a		19.737	4

Women

Athlete	Event	Qualification						Final					
Athlete	Event	Apparatus				Total	Rank	Apparatus				Total	Rank
Athlete	Event	F	UB	BB	V	Total	Rank	F	UB	BB	V	Total	Rank
Diana Doudeva	All-around	19.800	19.600	19.625	19.625	39.325	9 Q	9.800	9.875	9.825	9.900	78.725	9
Khrabrina Khrabrova	All-around	19.225	18.475	18.725	19.600	76.025	62	did not advance					
Mariya Kartalova	All-around	19.500	19.250	19.150	19.350	77.250	35	did not advance					
Ivelina Raykova	All-around	19.575	19.400	19.325	19.550	77.850	20	did not advance					
Boriana Stoyanova	All-around	19.300	19.300	19.525	19.825	38.975	17 Q	9.775	9.875	9.725	9.850	78.200	13
Deliana Vodenitcharova	All-around	19.750	19.500	19.475	19.600	39.162	15 Q	9.700	9.800	9.775	9.900	78.337	12
Diana Doudeva; Khrabrina Khrabrova; Mariya Kartalova; Ivelina Raykova; Boriana Stoyanova; Deliana Vodenitcharova	Team all-around	—N/a						98.200	97.125	97.125	98.100	390.550	5

Individual finals

Athlete	Event	Apparatus				Total	Rank
Athlete	Event	F	UB	BB	V	Total	Rank
Diana Doudeva	Floor	19.850	—N/a			19.850	Bronze medal
Diana Doudeva	Balance beam	—N/a		19.724	—N/a	19.724	6
Boriana Stoyanova	Vault	—N/a			19.780	19.780	4
Deliana Vodenitcharova	Floor	19.837	—N/a			19.837	4

=== Rhythmic gymnastics ===
Athlete	Event	Final							
Athlete	Event	Rope	Hoop	Clubs	Ribbon	Total	Prelim Total	Total	Rank
Adriana Dunavska	Individual	10.000	10.000	10.000	10.000	40.000	19.950	59.950	Silver medal
Bianka Panova	Individual	10.000	10.000	10.000	10.000	40.000	19.725	59.725	4

== Judo ==
Men

Athlete	Event	Preliminary	Round of 32	Round of 16	Quarterfinals	Semifinals	Repechage 1	Repechage 2	Repechage 3	Final / BM	
Athlete	Event	Opposition Result	Opposition Result	Opposition Result	Opposition Result	Opposition Result	Opposition Result	Opposition Result	Opposition Result	Opposition Result	Rank
Pavel Botev	−60 kg	BYE	Mikhalakis Skouroumounis (CYP); W 0010–0000	Patrick Roux (FRA); L 0000–0010	did not advance						
Ivo Kostadinov	−65 kg	Mark Adshead (GBR); W 0001–0000	Guido Schumacher (GER); W 1000–0000	Janusz Pawłowski (POL); L 0000–1000	—N/a		BYE	Philip Laats (BEL); L 0000–0010	did not advance		
Georgi Petrov	−86 kg	BYE	Ng Chiu Fan (HKG); W 1000–0000	János Gyáni (HUN); L 0000–1000	did not advance						
Marko Valev	−95 kg	—N/a	Juri Fazi (ITA); L 0000–0100	did not advance							
Dimitar Zapryanov	+95 kg	—N/a	Roger Vachon (FRA); W 0010–0000	Hitoshi Saito (JPN); L 0000–1000	—N/a		BYE	Lansana Coly (SEN); W 1000–0000	Mohamed Rashwan (EGY); W 0001–0000	Cho Yong-chul (KOR); L 0000–0001	5

== Rowing ==
Men

Athlete	Event	Heats		Repechage		Semifinals		Final	
Athlete	Event	Time	Rank	Time	Rank	Time	Rank	Time	Rank
Vasil Radev; Daniel Yordanov	Double sculls	6:17.92	3 R	6:41.10	2 Q	6:20.33	4 FB	7:04.39	8
Emil Groytsev; Atanas Andreev; Stefan Stoykov	Coxed pair	7:15.24	2 Q	BYE		7:01.23	1 Q	7:03.04	5
Rumen Aleksiev; Emil Bondev; Yuri Dyulgerov; Ivo Gelov; Dimitar Kamburski; Ventseslav Kanchev; Ivan Stanev; Dimitar Tonchev; Nikola Zlatanov	Eight	5:48.25	4 R	5:40.93	3 FB	—N/a		5:49.99	8

Women

Athlete	Event	Heats		Repechage		Semifinals		Final	
Athlete	Event	Time	Rank	Time	Rank	Time	Rank	Time	Rank
Magdalena Georgieva	Single sculls	7:50.64	1 Q	BYE		7:35.47	1 Q	7:53.65	Bronze medal
Violeta Ninova; Stefka Madina	Double sculls	7:32.82	2 R	7:24.96	1 Q	—N/a		7:06.03	Bronze medal
Radka Stoyanova; Lalka Berberova	Coxless pair	7:48.68	2 R	7:50.94	1 Q	—N/a		7:31.95	Silver medal
Pavlina Khristova; Galina Anakhrieva; Iskra Velinova; Krasimira Tocheva	Quadruple sculls	6:23.22	1 Q	—N/a				6:24.10	4
Teodora Zareva; Violeta Zareva; Miglena Mikhaleva; Svetla Durchova; Greta Georgieva; Olya Stoichkova; Mariana Stoyanova; Katia Todorova	Coxed four	7:11.59	2 R	7:20.78	FB	—N/a		7:02.27	4
Emilia Mikhaleva; Teodora Zareva; Violeta Zareva; Nevyana Ivanova; Olya Stoichkova; Todorka Vasileva; Rita Todorova; Mariana Stoyanova; Daniela Oronova; Greta Georgieva	Eight	6:47.99	4 R		2 Q	—N/a		6:25.02	5

== Shooting ==
Men

Athlete	Event	Qualification		Final	
Athlete	Event	Score	Rank	Score	Rank
Lyubtcho Diakov	50 m pistol	554	23	did not advance	
Lyubtcho Diakov	10 m air pistol	575	23	did not advance	
Tanyu Kiryakov	50 m pistol	566	3 Q	656	4
Tanyu Kiryakov	10 m air pistol	585	3 Q	687.9 OR	Gold medal
Georgi Poliakov	50 m rifle three positions	1161	28	did not advance	
Georgi Poliakov	50 m rifle prone	593	32	did not advance	
Georgi Poliakov	10 m air rifle	582	31	did not advance	
Petar Zaprianov	50 m rifle three positions	1162	27	did not advance	
Petar Zaprianov	50 m rifle prone	590	41	did not advance	

Women

Athlete	Event	Qualification		Final	
Athlete	Event	Score	Rank	Score	Rank
Vesela Letcheva	50 m rifle three positions	583	6	683.2	Silver medal
Vesela Letcheva	10 m air rifle	389	17	did not advance	
Nonka Matova	50 m rifle three positions	580	11	did not advance	
Nonka Matova	10 m air rifle	391	12	did not advance	

== Swimming ==
Men

Athlete	Event	Heat		Final B		Final	
Athlete	Event	Time	Rank	Time	Rank	Time	Rank
Tzvetan Golomeev	50 metre freestyle	23.41	13	DNS		did not advance	
Tzvetan Golomeev	100 metre freestyle	50.82	15	51.16	15	did not advance	
Georgi Mihalev	100 metre backstroke	57.06	11	57.17	13	did not advance	
Georgi Mihalev	200 metre backstroke	2:02.71	13	2:04.24	13	did not advance	

Women

Athlete	Event	Heat		Final B		Final	
Athlete	Event	Time	Rank	Time	Rank	Time	Rank
Tanya Dangalakova	100 metre breaststroke	1:08.35	1	did not advance		1:07.95	Gold medal
Tanya Dangalakova	200 metre breaststroke	2:29.91	5	did not advance		2:28.43	4
Antoaneta Frenkeva	100 metre breaststroke	1:10.09	5	did not advance		1:08.74	Silver medal
Antoaneta Frenkeva	200 metre breaststroke	2:29.57	3	did not advance		2:28.34	Bronze medal
Bistra Gospodinova	100 metre backstroke	1:04.91	19	did not advance			
Natasha Khristova	100 metre freestyle	57.80	24	did not advance			
Neviana Miteva	100 metre butterfly	1:02.01	11	1:02.47	12	did not advance	
Neviana Miteva	200 metre butterfly	2:18.44	19	did not advance			
Antoaneta Strumenlieva	400 metre freestyle	4:13.25	11	4:13.43	12	did not advance	
Antoaneta Strumenlieva	800 metre freestyle	8:35.40	8	did not advance		8:41.05	8
Antoaneta Strumenlieva	400 metre individual medley	4:51.58	12	did not advance		4:52.33	12
Bistra Gospodinova; Tanya Dangalakova; Neviana Miteva; Natasha Khristova	4 × 100 m medley relay	4:15.22	6	did not advance		4:12.36	6

== Table tennis ==
=== Group E ===
Rank	Athlete	W	L	GW	GL	PW	PL	KOR	SWE	JPN	IND	BUL	POL	CHI	EGY
1	Kim Ki-taik (KOR)	7	0	21	5	514	394	X	3–2	3–2	3–0	3–0	3–0	3–1	3–0
2	Jörgen Persson (SWE)	6	1	20	7	516	384	2–3	X	3–2	3–1	3–0	3–1	3–0	3–0
3	Kiyoshi Saito (JPN)	5	2	19	6	499	397	2–3	2–3	X	3–0	3–0	3–0	3–0	3–0
4	Kamlesh Mehta (IND)	4	3	13	12	470	457	0–3	1–3	0–3	X	3–1	3–1	3–0	3–1
5	Mariano Domuschiev (BUL)	3	4	10	15	425	473	0–3	0–3	0–3	1–3	X	3–0	3–2	3–1
6	Piotr Molenda (POL)	2	5	8	17	405	474	0–3	1–3	0–3	1–3	0–3	X	3–1	3–1
7	Jorge Gambra (CHI)	1	6	7	18	413	490	1–3	0–3	0–3	0–3	2–3	1–3	X	3–0
8	Sherif El-Saket (EGY)	0	7	3	21	324	497	0–3	0–3	0–3	1–3	1–3	1–3	0–3	X

=== Women ===
==== Group G ====
Rank	Athlete	W	L	GW	GL	PW	PL	NED	BUL	TCH	YUG	ARG	EGY
1	Bettine Vriesekoop (NED)	5	0	15	1	335	197	X	3–1	3–0	3–0	3–0	3–0
2	Daniela Guergueltcheva (BUL)	4	1	13	5	357	268	1–3	X	3–0	3–2	3–0	3–0
3	Alena Šafářová (TCH)	3	2	9	6	268	225	0–3	0–3	X	3–0	3–0	3–0
4	Gordana Perkučin (YUG)	2	3	8	9	282	296	0–3	2–3	0–3	X	3–0	3–0
5	Kim Hae-Ja (ARG)	1	4	3	13	214	319	0–3	0–3	0–3	0–3	X	3–1
6	Nihal Meshref (EGY)	0	5	1	15	182	333	0–3	0–3	0–3	0–3	1–3	X

==== Round of 16 ====
Chen Jing (CHN) - Daniela Guergueltcheva (BUL) 3:0 21–15, 21–7, 22–20

== Tennis ==
Women

Athlete	Event	Round of 64	Round of 32	Round of 16	Quarterfinals	Semifinals	Final / BM	
Athlete	Event	Opposition Score	Opposition Score	Opposition Score	Opposition Score	Opposition Score	Opposition Score	Rank
Katerina Maleeva	Singles	BYE	Gisele Miró (BRA); W 7–5, 6–1	Pam Shriver (USA); L 3–6, 6–3, 2–6	did not advance			
Manuela Maleeva	Singles	BYE	Mercedes Paz (ARG); W 6–1, 6–2	Catarina Lindqvist (SWE); W 6–1, 6–0	Raffaella Reggi (ITA); W 6–3, 6–4	Gabriela Sabatini (ARG); L 1–6, 1–6	did not advance	Bronze medal
Manuela Maleeva; Katerina Maleeva	Doubles	—N/a		Elizabeth Smylie; Wendy Turnbull (AUS); W 2–6, 6–3, 0–6	did not advance			

== Volleyball ==
=== Preliminary round ===
Pool A

Pos	Team	Pld	W	L	Pts	SW	SL	SR	SPW	SPL	SPR	Qualification
1	Soviet Union	5	4	1	9	14	4	3.500	248	190	1.305	Semifinals
2	Brazil	5	4	1	9	14	7	2.000	296	225	1.316	Semifinals
3	Sweden	5	2	3	7	9	11	0.818	220	262	0.840	5th–8th semifinals
4	Bulgaria	5	2	3	7	7	9	0.778	190	194	0.979	5th–8th semifinals
5	Italy	5	2	3	7	7	11	0.636	203	222	0.914	9th–12th semifinals
6	South Korea	5	1	4	6	5	14	0.357	200	264	0.758	9th–12th semifinals

Date		Score		Set 1	Set 2	Set 3	Set 4	Set 5	Total
18 Sep	Soviet Union	3–0	Bulgaria	15–7	15–9	15–8			45–24
19 Sep	Bulgaria	3–0	Italy	15–7	15–8	15–6			45–21
22 Sep	Brazil	3–1	Bulgaria	13–15	15–6	15–12	15–12		58–45
24 Sep	Bulgaria	3–0	South Korea	15–7	15–10	15–8			45–25
26 Sep	Sweden	3–0	Bulgaria	15–11	15–12	15–8			45–31

==== 5th–8th semifinals ====
Date		Score		Set 1	Set 2	Set 3	Set 4	Set 5	Total
28 Sep	Bulgaria	3–0	France	15–8	15–12	15–11			45–31

==== 5th place match ====
Date		Score		Set 1	Set 2	Set 3	Set 4	Set 5	Total
01 Oct	Netherlands	3–0	Bulgaria	15–6	15–8	15–10			45–24

Team Roster

- Kostadin Mitev
- Petyo Draguiev
- Borislav Kyossev
- Ljubomir Ganev
- Ilian Kaziiski
- Dimo Tonev
- Petko Petkov
- Plamen Khristov
- Sava Kovatchev
- Nayden Naydenov
- Miltcho Milanov
- Zvetan Florov

Head coach: Todor Piperkov

== Weightlifting ==
Men

Athlete	Event	Snatch		Clean & Jerk		Total	Rank
Athlete	Event	Result	Rank	Result	Rank	Total	Rank
Sevdalin Marinov	−52 kg	120	1	150	1	270 OR	Gold medal
Mitko Grablev	−56 kg	~~130~~	1	~~167.5~~	1	~~297.5~~	DQ
Stefan Topurov	−60 kg	137.5	2	175	2	312.5	Silver medal
Angel Guenchev	−67,5 kg	~~160~~	1	~~202.5~~	1	~~362.5~~	DQ
Borislav Gidikov	−75 kg	167.5 OR	1	207.5 OR	1	375	Gold medal
Aleksandar Varbanov	−75 kg	157.5	3	200	2	357.5	Bronze medal

== Wrestling ==
Men's freestyle

Athlete	Event	Elimination Pool								Final round	
Athlete	Event	Round 1 Result	Round 2 Result	Round 3 Result	Round 4 Result	Round 5 Result	Round 6 Result	Round 7 Result	Rank	Final round Result	Rank
Ivan Tzonov	−48 kg	Sergey Karamchakov (URS); L 1–3	Hour Jiunn-Yih (TPE); W 4–0	Mohammad Razigul (AFG); W 3–1	Rajesh Kumar (IND); W 3–1	BYE	Reiner Heugabel (FRG); W 3–0	—N/a	1	Takashi Kobayashi (JPN); L 0–3	Silver medal
Valentin Yordanov	−52 kg	Carlos Negron (PUR); W 4–0	Oushane Diallo (GUI); W 4–0	Kenneth Chertow (USA); W 3–0	BYE	Šaban Trstena (YUG); L 1–3	Vladimir Toguzov (URS); L 0–3	—N/a	4	Tserenbaataryn Enkhbayar (MGL); L 0–4	8
Valentin Ivanov	−57 kg	Chen Yongliang (CHN); W 4–0	Ramón Meña (PAN); W 4–0	Mourad Zelfani (TUN); W 4–0	BYE	Askari Mohammadian (IRN); L 1–3	Noh Kyung-Sun (KOR); L 1–3	—N/a	3	Béla Nagy (HUN); W 3–1	5
Simeon Shterev	−62 kg	Kazuhito Sakae (JPN); W 3–1	John Smith (USA); L 1–3	Daniel Cumming (AUS); W 4–0	Marian Skubacz (POL); W 3–0	Avirmediin Enkhee (MGL); W 3–0	BYE		2	Akbar Fallah (IRN); W 3–1	Bronze medal
Angel Yassenov	−68 kg	Arsen Fadzayev (URS); L 1–3	Ho Bisgaltu (CHN); W 3–1	Georgios Athanasiadis (GRE); W 3–1	Herminio Hidalgo (PAN); W 4–0	Kosei Akaishi (JPN); L 1–3	—N/a		4	Alexander Leipold (FRG); L 1–3	8
Rahmat Sofiadi	−74 kg	Jean Manga (CMR); W 4–0	Monday Eguabor (NGR); W 4–0	BYE	Yoshihiko Hara (JPN); W 3–1	Claudiu Tămăduianu (ROU); W 3–0	Adlan Varayev (URS); L 1–3	Ayat Vagozari (IRN); W 4–0	2	Lodoyn Enkhbayar (MGL); W 3–1	Bronze medal
Alexander Nanev	−82 kg	Mark Schultz (USA); L 0–3	Andrzej Radomski (POL); L 1–3	—N/a					11	did not advance	
Rumen Alabakov	−90 kg	Jerzy Nieć (POL); W 3–1	Mohammad Reza Toupchi (IRN); W 3–1	Bodo Lukowski (FRG); W 3–1	Hubert Bindels (BEL); W 3–0	Edwin Lins (AUT); W 4–0	Kim Tae-woo (KOR); L 1–3	Makharbek Khadartsev (URS); L 0–4	3	Jim Scherr (USA); L 1–3	6
Georgi Karaduchev	−100 kg	Wilfried Colling (FRG); W 3–0	Július Strnisko (TCH); W 3–1	Vasile Puşcaşu (ROU); L 1–3	Babacar Sar (MTN); W 4–0	Noel Loban (GBR); W 3–1	William Scherr (USA); L 1–3	—N/a	3	Boldyn Javkhlantögs (MGL); W 4–0	5
Atanas Atanassov	−130 kg	BYE	László Klauz (HUN); L 0–3	Dennis Atiyeh (SYR); W 4–0	David Gobezhishvili (URS); L 1–3	BYE			3	Dan Payne (CAN); W 3–1	5

Men's Greco-Roman

Athlete	Event	Elimination Pool								Final round	
Athlete	Event	Round 1 Result	Round 2 Result	Round 3 Result	Round 4 Result	Round 5 Result	Round 6 Result	Round 7 Result	Rank	Final round Result	Rank
Bratan Tsenov	−48 kg	Yang Zhizhong (CHN); W 3–0	Markus Scherer (FRG); W 3–0	Lars Rønningen (NOR); W 3–0	BYE	Vincenzo Maenza (ITA); L 1–3	BYE		2	Mahaddin Allahverdiyev (URS); W 3–0	Bronze medal
Hristo Fliev	−52 kg	Jihad Sharif (JOR); W 3–0	Florentino Tirante (PHI); W 4–0	Erol Kemah (TUR); W 4–0	Alexander Ignatenko (URS); L 0–3	Atsuji Miyahara (JPN); L 1–3	—N/a		4	Peter Stjernberg (SWE); W 3–1	7
Stoyan Balov	−57 kg	Zoran Galović (YUG); W 4–0	BYE	Kacem Bouallouche (MAR); W 4–0	Keijo Pehkonen (FIN); W 3–1	Huh Byung-Ho (KOR); W 3–1	Haralambos Holidis (GRE); W 3–0	—N/a	1	András Sike (HUN); L 0–4	Silver medal
Zhivko Vangelov	−62 kg	Jenő Bódi (BUL); W 3–0	Jukka Loikas (FIN); W 3–1	Shigeki Nishiguchi (JPN); W 4–0	Hugo Dietsche (SUI); W 4–0	—N/a			1	Kamandar Madzhidov (URS); L 1–3	Silver medal
Georgi Karamanliev	−68 kg	Kiptoo Salbei (KEN); W 4–0	BYE	Attila Repka (HUN); L 0–3	Jerzy Kopański (POL); L 0–3	—N/a			8	did not advance	
Borislav Velichkov	−74 kg	Jean Manga (CMR); W 4–0	Wei Qingkun (CHN); W 3–0	Kim Young-Nam (KOR); L 1–3	Franc Podlesek (YUG); W 3–0	BYE	Józef Tracz (POL); L 1–3	—N/a	3	Martial Mischler (FRA); L 1–3	6
Angel Stoykov	−82 kg	Mehdi Moradi Ganji (IRN); W 3–0	Moustafa Ramadan Hussein (EGY); W 3–0	John Morgan (USA); DQ 0–0	Tibor Komáromi (HUN); L 1–3	—N/a			6	did not advance	
Atanas Komchev	−90 kg	Yasutoshi Moriyama (JPN); W 3–0	Samba Adama (MTN); W 4–0	Franz Pitschmann (AUT); W 3–1	Christer Gulldén (SWE); W 3–0	Georgios Pikilidis (GRE); W 3–1	—N/a		1	Harri Koskela (FIN); W 3–0	Gold medal
Ilia Georgiev	−100 kg	Ambroise Sarr (SEN); W 4–0	Tamás Gáspár (HUN); L 1–3	Sören Claeson (SWE); W 3–0	Yoo Young-Tae (KOR); W 4–0	BYE	Gerhard Himmel (FRG); L 1–3	—N/a	2	Dennis Koslowski (USA); L 0–3	4
Rangel Gerovski	−130 kg	Daniel Payne (CAN); W 3–0	Fabio Valguarnera (ITA); W 3–0	Roman Wrocławski (POL); W 3–0	Hassan El-Hadad (EGY); W 3–0	Kazuya Deguchi (JPN); W 3–0	—N/a		1	Aleksandr Karelin (URS); L 1–3	Silver medal
