= Gymnastics at the 1986 Goodwill Games =

Gymnastics Competition Results

- Location: (Soviet Union) Moscow, USSR
- Start date: July 5, 1986
- End date: July 20, 1986

At the 1986 Goodwill Games, two different gymnastics disciplines were contested: artistic gymnastics and rhythmic gymnastics.

== Artistic Gymnastics ==
=== Medalists ===
Event	Gold	Silver	Bronze
Men
Team all-around	Soviet Union; Yuri Korolyov; Vladimir Artemov; Valentin Mogilny; Valeri Liukin; Yuri Balabanov; Aleksei Tikhonkikh	East Germany; Ulf Hoffmann; Stein Koeplin-Fritsche; Sylvio Kroll; Sven Tippelt; Holger Behrendt; Mario Reichert	China; Wang Chongsheng; Fu Luming; Go Linsheng; Wofu Huang; Li Chunyang; Fan Min
Individual all-around	(Soviet Union) Yuri Korolyov	(Soviet Union) Valentin Mogilny	(Soviet Union) Vladimir Artemov
Floor	(Soviet Union) Yuri Korolyov	(Soviet Union) Valentin Mogilny (China) Li Chunyang	none awarded
Pommel horse	(Soviet Union) Valentin Mogilny	(Soviet Union) Yuri Korolyov	(Romania) Marian Rizan
Rings	(Soviet Union) Valentin Mogilny (Soviet Union) Yuri Korolyov	none awarded	(East Germany) Sven Tippelt
Vault	(Soviet Union) Valeri Liukin	(Romania) Marian Stoican	(East Germany) Sylvio Kroll (China) Fan Min
Parallel bars	(Soviet Union) Valentin Mogilny (North Korea) Chon Hon Li	none awarded	(East Germany) Sven Tippelt
Horizontal bar	(Soviet Union) Yuri Korolyov	(China) Wang Chongsheng (Hungary) Zsolt Borkai	none awarded
Women
Team all-around	Soviet Union; Vera Kolesnikova; Elena Shushunova; Oksana Omelianchik; Elena Shevchenko; Olga Strazheva; Natalia Yurchenko	Bulgaria; Diana Dudeva; Ivelina Raykova; Bojanka Demireva	China; Luo Fang; Chen Cuiting; Wang Wenjing; Wang Huiying; Yu Feng
Individual all-around	(Soviet Union) Vera Kolesnikova	(Soviet Union) Elena Shushunova	(Soviet Union) Oksana Omelianchik
Vault	(Soviet Union) Elena Shushunova	(Soviet Union) Elena Shevchenko	(United States) Joyce Wilborn
Uneven bars	(Soviet Union) Elena Shushunova	(Soviet Union) Vera Kolesnikova	(North Korea) Choi Mil-Hyang
Balance beam	(Soviet Union) Vera Kolesnikova	(Soviet Union) Elena Shushunova	(Bulgaria) Diana Dudeva
Floor	(Soviet Union) Elena Shushunova	(Soviet Union) Oksana Omelianchik	(Romania) Mirela Sidon

== Rhythmic Gymnastics ==
=== Medalists ===
Event	Gold	Silver	Bronze
Individual all-around	(Soviet Union) Tatiana Druchinina	(Soviet Union) Marina Lobach	(Soviet Union) Galina Beloglazova
Rope	(East Germany) Bianca Dittrich (Soviet Union) Marina Lobach (Soviet Union) Tatiana Druchinina	none awarded	none awarded
Ball	(Soviet Union) Galina Beloglazova (Soviet Union) Tatiana Druchinina	none awarded	(Bulgaria) Cvetomira Filipova
Clubs	(Soviet Union) Marina Lobach	(Soviet Union) Galina Beloglazova	(Bulgaria) Cvetomira Filipova
Ribbon	(Soviet Union) Tatiana Druchinina	(Soviet Union) Marina Lobach	(Bulgaria) Adriana Dunavska (East Germany) Bianca Dittrich

== Details ==
=== Artistic Gymnastics ===
==== Men ====
===== Team All-Around =====
Rank	Country	Floor (gymnastics)	Pommel horse	Rings (gymnastics)	Vault (gymnastics)	Parallel bars	Horizontal bar	Total
1st place, gold medalist(s)	Soviet Union (URS)	48.65	48.80	47.90	47.85	48.40	48.55	290.15
2nd place, silver medalist(s)	East Germany (GDR)	47.55	47.05	47.60	47.20	47.95	47.60	284.95
3rd place, bronze medalist(s)	China (CHN)	48.60	46.35	46.00	47.25	47.10	48.35	283.65
4	Romania (ROU)	46.45	46.55	46.60	47.20	47.50	47.55	281.85
5	United States of America (USA)	47.25	48.00	46.40	45.30	47.60	47.15	281.70
6	Japan (JPN)	47.80	45.95	46.60	46.75	47.45	46.75	281.30

===== Individual All-Around =====
Rank	Gymnast	Floor (gymnastics)	Pommel horse	Rings (gymnastics)	Vault (gymnastics)	Parallel bars	Horizontal bar	Score	Prelim score	Total
1st place, gold medalist(s)	Yuri Korolyov (URS)	9.800	9.800	9.800	9.750	9.750	9.800	58.700	58.450	117.150
2nd place, silver medalist(s)	Valentin Mogilny (URS)	9.800	9.400	9.700	9.600	9.900	9.900	58.300	58.250	116.550
3rd place, bronze medalist(s)	Vladimir Artemov (URS)	9.750	9.700	9.750	9.650	9.900	9.800	58.550	57.900	116.450
4	Sylvio Kroll (GDR)	9.700	9.750	9.700	9.750	9.800	9.800	58.500	57.550	116.050
5	Wang Chongsheng (CHN)	9.700	9.700	9.500	9.600	9.700	9.700	57.900	57.250	115.150
6	Sven Tippelt (GDR)	9.600	9.700	9.650	9.550	9.550	9.300	57.350	57.100	114.450
7	Charles Lakes (USA)	9.700	9.550	9.300	9.600	9.700	9.500	57.350	56.750	114.100
8	Fu Luming (CHN)	9.650	9.000	9.650	9.450	9.750	9.700	57.200	56.700	113.900
9	Holger Behrendt (GDR)	9.500	9.350	9.350	9.600	9.550	9.650	57.000	56.800	113.800
10	Marius Toba (ROU)	9.600	9.450	9.600	9.600	9.650	9.000	56.900	56.500	113.400
10	Chon Hon Li (PRK)	9.700	9.700	9.200	9.550	9.500	9.650	57.300	56.100	113.400
10	Kalofer Khristosov (BUL)	9.600	9.500	9.550	9.400	9.550	9.450	57.050	56.350	113.400
13	Philip Cahoy (USA)	9.550	9.500	9.200	9.350	9.650	9.500	56.750	56.550	113.300
14	Shidemitsu Kondo (JPN)	9.550	9.300	9.400	9.550	9.400	9.350	56.550	56.700	113.250
15	Marius Gherman (ROU)	9.450	9.500	9.050	9.150	9.650	9.600	56.400	56.650	113.050
16	Li Chunyang (CHN)	9.350	9.000	9.500	9.450	9.600	9.700	56.600	56.350	112.950
17	Yukihiro Hayase (JPN)	9.600	9.400	9.600	9.500	9.700	9.200	57.000	55.700	112.700
18	Valentin Pintea (ROU)	9.600	9.200	9.550	9.650	9.250	9.000	56.250	55.800	112.050
19	Antonio Fraguas (ESP)	9.200	9.300	9.250	9.450	9.600	9.450	56.250	55.550	111.800
20	Miguel Rubio (ESP)	9.000	9.450	9.300	9.450	9.500	9.400	56.100	55.650	111.750
21	Dennis Hayden (USA)	9.500	9.050	8.900	9.400	9.500	9.200	55.550	56.000	111.550
22	Ivan Nastev (BUL)	9.400	8.850	9.450	9.050	9.500	9.750	56.000	55.500	111.500
23	Dian Kolev (BUL)	9.500	9.300	9.450	9.550	9.550	9.400	56.750	54.650	111.400
24	Chol Nam Kim (PRK)	9.400	9.250	8.950	9.200	9.500	9.800	56.100	54.900	111.000
25	Zsolt Borkai (HUN)	8.500	9.600	9.300	9.400	8.950	9.000	54.750	56.150	110.900
26	Corrado Scaglia (ITA)	9.350	9.300	9.000	9.550	9.200	9.300	55.700	55.050	110.750
27	Matthias Riessland (FRG)	9.000	8.950	8.450	9.200	9.300	9.500	54.400	54.400	108.800
28	Wolfgang Jochle (FRG)	9.200	8.150	8.900	9.300	8.100	9.550	53.200	53.850	107.050
29	Naamo Alaadin (SYR)	8.700	7.800	8.400	9.250	8.150	8.850	51.150	50.800	101.950
30	Hiroaki Okabe (JPN)	0.000	0.000	9.450	9.500	9.550	2.100	30.600	56.450	87.050

===== Floor =====
Rank	Gymnast	Score	Prelim score	Total
1st place, gold medalist(s)	Yuri Korolyov (URS)	9.900	9.800	19.700
2nd place, silver medalist(s)	Valentin Mogilny (URS)	9.850	9.800	19.650
2nd place, silver medalist(s)	Li Chunyang (CHN)	9.850	9.800	19.650
4	Wang Chongsheng (CHN)	9.800	9.750	19.550
5	Charles Lakes (USA)	9.700	9.650	19.350
6	Ulf Hoffmann (GDR)	9.700	9.600	19.300
7	Shidemitsu Kondo (JPN)	9.450	9.750	19.200
7	Yukihiro Hayase (JPN)	9.600	9.600	19.200

===== Pommel horse =====
Rank	Gymnast	Score	Prelim score	Total
1st place, gold medalist(s)	Valentin Mogilny (URS)	9.900	9.900	19.800
2nd place, silver medalist(s)	Yuri Korolyov (URS)	9.900	9.800	19.700
3rd place, bronze medalist(s)	Marian Rizan (ROU)	9.750	9.750	19.500
4	Philip Cahoy (USA)	9.750	9.500	19.450
5	Stein Koeplin-Fritsche (GDR)	9.750	9.650	19.400
6	Brian Babcock (USA)	9.550	9.600	19.150
7	Sylvio Kroll (GDR)	9.300	9.600	18.900
8	Shidemitsu Kondo (JPN)	8.900	9.500	18.400

===== Rings =====
Rank	Gymnast	Score	Prelim score	Total
1st place, gold medalist(s)	Yuri Korolyov (URS)	9.900	9.750	19.650
1st place, gold medalist(s)	Valentin Mogilny (URS)	9.900	9.750	19.650
3rd place, bronze medalist(s)	Sven Tippelt (GDR)	9.700	9.650	19.350
4	Marius Toba (ROU)	9.700	9.550	19.250
5	Kalofer Khristosov (BUL)	9.600	9.600	19.200
6	Ulf Hoffmann (GDR)	9.600	9.550	19.150
6	Luming Ru (CHN)	9.650	9.500	19.150
8	Valentin Pintea (ROU)	9.250	9.600	18.850

===== Vault =====
Rank	Gymnast	Score	Prelim score	Total
1st place, gold medalist(s)	Valeri Liukin (URS)	9.725	9.700	19.450
2nd place, silver medalist(s)	Marian Stoican (ROU)	9.650	9.650	19.300
3rd place, bronze medalist(s)	Sylvio Kroll (GDR)	9.725	9.550	19.275
3rd place, bronze medalist(s)	Fan Min (CHN)	9.675	9.600	19.275
5	Yuri Korolyov (URS)	9.600	9.600	19.200
6	Marius Gherman (ROU)	9.550	9.550	19.100
7	Yukihiro Hayase (JPN)	9.575	9.500	19.075
8	Ulf Hoffmann (GDR)	9.425	9.500	18.025

===== Parallel bars =====
Rank	Gymnast	Score	Prelim score	Total
1st place, gold medalist(s)	Valentin Mogilny (URS)	9.900	9.750	19.650
1st place, gold medalist(s)	Chon Hon Li (PRK)	9.850	9.800	19.650
3rd place, bronze medalist(s)	Sven Tippelt (GDR)	9.900	9.650	19.550
4	Holger Behrendt (GDR)	9.750	9.700	19.450
5	Philip Cahoy (USA)	9.650	9.650	19.300
5	Marius Gherman (ROU)	9.700	9.600	19.300
7	Alexei Tikhonkikh (URS)	9.550	9.650	19.200
8	Marian Rizan (ROU)	8.900	9.700	18.600

===== Horizontal bar =====
Rank	Gymnast	Score	Prelim score	Total
1st place, gold medalist(s)	Yuri Korolyov (URS)	9.900	9.900	19.800
2nd place, silver medalist(s)	Wang Chongsheng (CHN)	9.850	9.800	19.650
2nd place, silver medalist(s)	Zsolt Borkai (HUN)	9.850	9.800	19.650
4	Go Linsheng (CHN)	9.800	9.800	19.600
5	Sylvio Kroll (GDR)	9.800	9.700	19.500
6	Chol Nam Kim (PRK)	9.500	9.900	19.400
7	Vladimir Artemov (URS)	9.400	9.750	19.150
8	Marius Gherman (ROU)	9.300	9.700	19.000

==== Women ====
===== Team All-Around =====
Rank	Country	Vault (gymnastics)	Uneven bars	Balance beam	Floor (gymnastics)	Total
1st place, gold medalist(s)	Soviet Union (URS)	49.300	49.250	49.250	49.050	196.850
2nd place, silver medalist(s)	Bulgaria (BUL)	48.100	47.500	47.200	47.800	190.600
3rd place, bronze medalist(s)	China (CHN)	48.250	47.650	46.550	47.800	190.250
4	Romania (ROU)	48.350	47.000	45.900	48.000	189.250
5	United States of America (USA)	47.950	47.250	45.300	47.750	188.250
6	East Germany (GDR)	47.750	47.150	46.050	47.050	188.000
7	Japan (JPN)	47.250	46.150	46.250	47.050	186.650

===== Individual All-Around =====
Rank	Gymnast	Vault (gymnastics)	Uneven bars	Balance beam	Floor (gymnastics)	Score	Prelim score	Total
1st place, gold medalist(s)	Vera Kolesnikova (URS)	9.800	9.800	9.900	9.850	39.350	39.200	78.550
2nd place, silver medalist(s)	Elena Shushunova (URS)	10.000	9.900	9.300	9.400	38.600	39.800	78.400
3rd place, bronze medalist(s)	Oksana Omelianchik (URS)	9.850	9.250	9.900	10.000	39.000	39.100	78.100
4	Gabriela Potorac (ROU)	9.650	9.700	9.800	9.650	38.800	38.200	77.000
5	Luo Fang (CHN)	9.800	9.500	9.650	9.600	38.550	38.150	76.700
6	Chen Cuiting (CHN)	9.700	9.550	9.600	9.350	38.200	38.400	76.600
7	Bojanka Demireva (BUL)	9.500	9.550	9.700	9.600	38.350	38.050	76.400
8	Mirela Sidon (ROU)	9.800	9.500	9.600	9.900	38.800	37.550	76.350
9	Ivelina Raykova (BUL)	9.550	9.650	9.200	9.700	38.100	38.250	76.350
10	Diana Dudeva (BUL)	9.650	9.200	9.600	9.600	38.050	38.250	76.300
11	Martina Jentsch (GDR)	9.550	9.500	9.750	9.400	38.200	38.050	76.250
12	Jana Vogel (GDR)	9.400	9.700	9.600	9.600	38.300	37.800	76.100
13	Joyce Wilborn (USA)	9.700	9.500	9.450	9.800	38.450	37.550	76.000
14	Liliana Stanciu (ROU)	9.500	9.350	9.650	9.550	38.050	37.650	75.700
14	Laura Munoz (ESP)	9.550	9.600	9.550	9.550	38.250	37.450	75.700
16	Hope Spivey (USA)	9.600	9.500	9.000	9.700	37.800	37.800	75.600
17	Maiko Morio (JPN)	9.400	9.500	9.500	9.650	38.050	37.500	75.550
18	Astrid Heese (GDR)	9.700	9.050	9.700	9.600	38.050	37.400	75.450
19	Yu Feng (CHN)	9.400	8.950	9.050	9.750	37.150	38.250	75.400
20	Chwe Milhyang (PRK)	9.400	9.600	9.350	9.550	37.900	37.400	75.300
21	Jennifer Sey (USA)	9.400	9.400	9.050	9.500	37.350	37.700	75.050
22	Miho Shinoda (JPN)	9.500	9.550	9.050	9.550	37.650	37.300	74.950
22	Nerea Esbrit Gil (ESP)	9.400	9.300	9.600	9.500	37.800	37.150	74.950
24	Miyako Kudo (JPN)	9.350	9.450	9.600	9.050	37.450	37.250	74.700
25	Kim Gum Ok (PRK)	8.600	9.500	9.450	9.400	36.950	37.400	74.350
26	Floriana Zanetti (ITA)	9.450	9.450	8.500	8.900	36.300	36.350	72.650
27	Ezster Szalontai (HUN)	9.300	8.850	9.100	9.400	36.650	35.750	72.400
28	Enese Korde (HUN)	8.750	8.700	9.250	9.400	36.100	35.450	71.550

===== Vault =====
Rank	Gymnast	Score	Prelim score	Total
1st place, gold medalist(s)	Elena Shushunova (URS)	9.913	9.950	19.863
2nd place, silver medalist(s)	Elena Shevchenko (URS)	9.900	9.900	19.800
3rd place, bronze medalist(s)	Joyce Wilborn (USA)	9.788	9.900	19.688
4	Gabriela Potorac (ROU)	9.800	9.750	19.550
5	Wang Huiying (CHN)	9.650	9.700	19.350
6	Mirela Sidon (ROU)	9.600	9.700	19.300
7	Angela Denkins (USA)	9.513	9.750	19.263
8	Chen Cuiting (CHN)	9.500	9.700	19.200

===== Uneven Bars =====
Rank	Gymnast	Score	Prelim score	Total
1st place, gold medalist(s)	Elena Shushunova (URS)	9.950	10.000	19.950
2nd place, silver medalist(s)	Vera Kolesnikova (URS)	9.850	9.800	19.650
3rd place, bronze medalist(s)	Milhyang Chwe (PRK)	9.750	9.800	19.550
4	Bojanka Demireva (BUL)	9.750	9.750	19.500
5	Gabriela Potorac (ROU)	9.775	9.650	19.425
6	Gumok Kim (PRK)	9.725	9.650	19.375
7	Chen Cuiting (CHN)	9.600	9.650	19.250
8	Ivelina Raykova (BUL)	9.300	9.650	18.950

===== Balance Beam =====
Rank	Gymnast	Score	Prelim score	Total
1st place, gold medalist(s)	Vera Kolesnikova (URS)	9.900	9.900	19.800
2nd place, silver medalist(s)	Elena Shushunova (URS)	9.775	9.950	19.725
3rd place, bronze medalist(s)	Diana Dudeva (BUL)	9.800	9.600	19.400
4	Luo Fang (CHN)	9.700	9.550	19.250
5	Ivelina Raykova (BUL)	9.700	9.500	18.200
6	Chen Cuiting (CHN)	9.675	9.450	19.125
7	Jana Vogel (GDR)	9.625	9.450	19.075
8	Nerea Esbrit Gil (ESP)	8.175	9.450	17.625

===== Floor =====
Rank	Gymnast	Score	Prelim score	Total
1st place, gold medalist(s)	Elena Shushunova (URS)	9.975	9.900	19.875
2nd place, silver medalist(s)	Oksana Omelianchik (URS)	9.900	9.900	19.800
3rd place, bronze medalist(s)	Mirela Sidon (ROU)	9.875	9.750	19.625
4	Joyce Wilborn (USA)	9.775	9.800	19.575
5	Wang Huiying (CHN)	9.850	9.650	19.500
6	Hope Spivey (USA)	9.775	9.700	19.475
7	Gabriela Potorac (ROU)	9.750	9.700	19.450
7	Diana Dudeva (BUL)	9.800	9.650	19.450

=== Rhythmic Gymnastics ===
==== All-Around ====
Rank	Name	Rope (rhythmic gymnastics)	Ball (rhythmic gymnastics)	Clubs (rhythmic gymnastics)	Ribbon (rhythmic gymnastics)	Total
1st place, gold medalist(s)	Tatiana Druchinina (URS)	10.000	10.000	10.000	10.000	40.000
2nd place, silver medalist(s)	Marina Lobach (URS)	10.000	10.000	10.000	9.900	39.900
3rd place, bronze medalist(s)	Galina Beloglazova (URS)	10.000	10.000	10.000	9.850	39.850
4	Cvetomira Filipova (BUL)	9.900	9.850	9.850	9.900	39.500
5	Florentina Butaru (ROM)	9.900	9.900	9.900	9.650	39.350
6	Adriana Dunavska (BUL)	9.750	9.800	9.850	9.900	39.300
7	Albena Naidenova (BUL)	9.850	9.800	9.800	9.700	39.150
7	Bianca Dittrich (GDR)	10.000	9.400	9.800	9.950	39.150
9	En Lan Kan (PRK)	10.000	9.650	9.800	9.650	39.100
10	Esther Niklas (GDR)	9.700	9.750	9.800	9.600	38.850
11	Ok Sun Tian (PRK)	9.750	9.800	9.650	9.600	38.800
12	Diane Simpson (USA)	9.650	9.650	9.750	9.700	38.750
13	Adriana Stuenescu (ROM)	9.600	9.700	9.700	9.500	38.700
13	Moncerrat Manzanares (ESP)	9.700	9.750	9.600	9.650	38.700
15	Kim Sun Bok (PRK)	9.750	9.500	9.800	9.600	38.650
15	Marina Kunyavsky (USA)	9.550	9.700	9.800	9.600	38.650
17	Maria Martin (ESP)	9.450	9.700	9.700	9.750	38.600
17	Franshiska Dumitrescu (ROM)	9.700	9.600	9.700	9.600	38.600
19	Irina Rubinshtein (USA)	9.600	9.600	9.650	9.450	38.300
19	Eeva-Liisa Narhi (FIN)	9.800	9.550	9.500	9.450	38.300
21	Cornelia Kunce (GDR)	9.700	9.000	9.700	9.600	38.000
22	Mira Luhtanen (FIN)	9.500	9.200	9.450	9.400	37.550

==== Rope ====
Rank	Gymnast	Score	Prelim score	Total
1st place, gold medalist(s)	Bianca Dittrich (GDR)	10.000	10.000	20.000
1st place, gold medalist(s)	Marina Lobach (URS)	10.000	10.000	20.000
1st place, gold medalist(s)	Tatiana Druchinina (URS)	10.000	10.000	20.000
4	En Lan Kan (PRK)	9.900	10.000	19.900
5	Cvetomira Filipova (BUL)	10.000	9.900	19.900
6	Florentina Butaru (ROM)	9.900	9.900	19.800
7	Albena Naidenova (BUL)	9.850	9.850	19.700
8	Eeva-Liisa Narhi (FIN)	9.800	9.700	19.500

==== Ball ====
Rank	Gymnast	Score	Prelim score	Total
1st place, gold medalist(s)	Galina Beloglazova (URS)	10.000	10.000	20.000
1st place, gold medalist(s)	Tatiana Druchinina (URS)	10.000	10.000	20.000
3rd place, bronze medalist(s)	Cvetomira Filipova (BUL)	9.850	9.950	19.800
4	Florentina Butaru (ROM)	9.800	9.900	19.700
4	Albena Naidenova (BUL)	9.900	9.800	19.700
6	Ok Sun Tian (PRK)	9.850	9.800	19.650
7	Esther Niklas (GDR)	9.750	9.750	19.500
8	Moncerrat Manzanares (ESP)	9.700	9.750	19.450

==== Clubs ====
Rank	Gymnast	Score	Prelim score	Total
1st place, gold medalist(s)	Marina Lobach (URS)	10.000	10.000	20.000
2nd place, silver medalist(s)	Galina Beloglazova (URS)	9.900	10.000	19.900
3rd place, bronze medalist(s)	Cvetomira Filipova (BUL)	10.000	9.850	19.850
4	Adriana Dunavska (BUL)	9.900	9.850	19.750
4	En Lan Kan (PRK)	9.850	9.800	19.750
4	Esther Niklas (GDR)	9.850	9.800	19.750
7	Florentina Butaru (ROM)	9.400	9.900	19.300
8	Bianca Dittrich (GDR)	9.150	9.800	18.950

==== Ribbon ====
Rank	Gymnast	Score	Prelim score	Total
1st place, gold medalist(s)	Tatiana Druchinina (URS)	10.000	10.000	20.000
2nd place, silver medalist(s)	Marina Lobach (URS)	10.000	9.900	19.900
3rd place, bronze medalist(s)	Adriana Dunavska (BUL)	9.950	9.900	19.850
3rd place, bronze medalist(s)	Bianca Dittrich (GDR)	9.900	9.950	19.850
5	Cvetomira Filipova (BUL)	9.800	9.900	19.700
6	Adriana Stuenescu (ROM)	9.800	9.700	19.500
7	Maria Martin (ESP)	9.750	9.750	19.500
8	Diane Simpson (USA)	9.400	9.700	19.100

== Medal summary ==
=== Overall ===
* Host nation (Soviet Union)

Rank	Nation	Gold	Silver	Bronze	Total
1	Soviet Union (URS)	22	11	3	36
2	East Germany (GDR)	1	1	4	6
3	North Korea (PRK)	1	0	1	2
4	China (CHN)	0	2	3	5
5	Bulgaria (BUL)	0	1	4	5
6	Romania (ROU)	0	1	2	3
7	Hungary (HUN)	0	1	0	1
8	United States (USA)	0	0	1	1
Totals (8 entries)		24	17	18	59
