= Wrestling at the 1988 Summer Olympics – Men's freestyle 48 kg =

Men's freestyle 48 kg at the Games of the XXIV Olympiad
- Venue: Sangmu Gymnasium
- Dates: 27–29 September 1988
- Competitors: 19 from 19 nations

Medalists
1st place, gold medalist(s)		Takashi Kobayashi	Japan
2nd place, silver medalist(s)		Ivan Tsonov	Bulgaria
3rd place, bronze medalist(s)		Sergey Karamchakov	Soviet Union

The Men's Freestyle 48 kg at the 1988 Summer Olympics as part of the wrestling program were held at the Sangmu Gymnasium, Seongnam.

== Medalists ==
Gold	Takashi Kobayashi; Japan
Silver	Ivan Tsonov; Bulgaria
Bronze	Sergey Karamchakov; Soviet Union

== Tournament results ==
The wrestlers are divided into 2 groups. The winner of each group decided by a double-elimination system.

Legend

- TF — Won by Fall
- SP — Won by Superiority, 12-14 points difference, the loser with points
- SO — Won by Superiority, 12-14 points difference, the loser without points
- ST — Won by Technical Superiority, 15 points difference
- PP — Won by Points, the loser with technical points
- PO — Won by Points, the loser without technical points
- P0 — Won by Passivity, scoring zero points
- P1 — Won by Passivity, while leading by 1-11 points
- PS — Won by Passivity, while leading by 12-14 points
- PA — Won by Opponent Injury
- DQ — Won by Forfeit
- DNA — Did not appear
- L — Losses
- ER — Round of Elimination
- CP — Classification Points
- TP — Technical Points

=== Eliminatory round ===
==== Group A ====
L		CP	TP		L
Round 1
0	Reiner Heugabel (FRG)	4-0 TF	3:52	Tümendembereliin Sükhbaatar (MGL)	1
1	Liang Dejin (CHN)	1-3 PP	7-13	Rajesh Kumar (IND)	0
0	Mohammad Razigul (AFG)	3-1 PP	12-3	Suryadi Gunawan (INA)	1
0	Sergey Karamchakov (URS)	3-1 PP	7-1	Ivan Tsonov (BUL)	1
0	Volker Anger (GDR)	3-1 PP	14-5	Hour Jiunn-yih (TPE)	1
Round 2
0	Reiner Heugabel (FRG)	4-0 TF	2:55	Liang Dejin (CHN)	2
2	Tümendembereliin Sükhbaatar (MGL)	1-3 PP	6-7	Rajesh Kumar (IND)	0
1	Mohammad Razigul (AFG)	1-3 PP	2-12	Sergey Karamchakov (URS)	0
2	Suryadi Gunawan (INA)	1-3 PP	4-10	Volker Anger (GDR)	0
1	Ivan Tsonov (BUL)	4-0 ST	19-3	Hour Jiunn-Yih (TPE)	2
Round 3
0	Reiner Heugabel (FRG)	3.5-0 SO	12-0	Rajesh Kumar (IND)	1
2	Mohammad Razigul (AFG)	1-3 PP	3-10	Ivan Tsonov (BUL)	1
0	Sergey Karamchakov (URS)	3-0 PO	2-0	Volker Anger (GDR)	1
Round 4
0	Reiner Heugabel (FRG)	2-0 P0	5:01	Sergey Karamchakov (URS)	1
2	Rajesh Kumar (IND)	1-3 PP	8-11	Ivan Tsonov (BUL)	1
1	Volker Anger (GDR)			Bye	
Round 5
2	Volker Anger (GDR)	0-3 P1	4:28	Reiner Heugabel (FRG)	0
1	Sergey Karamchakov (URS)			Bye	
1	Ivan Tsonov (BUL)			Bye	
Round 6
1	Ivan Tsonov (BUL)	3-0 PO	3-0	Reiner Heugabel (FRG)	1
1	Sergey Karamchakov (URS)			Bye	

Wrestler	L	ER	CP	Tiebreaker
Ivan Tsonov (BUL)	1	-	14	4
Sergey Karamchakov (URS)	1	-	9	3
Reiner Heugabel (FRG)	1	-	16.5	2
Volker Anger (GDR)	2	5	6	
Rajesh Kumar (IND)	2	4	7	
Mohammad Razigul (AFG)	2	3	5	
Suryadi Gunawan (INA)	2	2	2	
Hour Jiunn-Yih (TPE)	2	2	1	
Liang Dejin (CHN)	2	2	1	
Tümendembereliin Sükhbaatar (MGL)	2	2	1	

==== Group B ====
L		CP	TP		L
Round 1
1	Alfredo Marcuño (ESP)	0-4 ST	0-16	Tim Vanni (USA)	0
1	Lee Sang-Ho (KOR)	0-4 PA	0:44	Takashi Kobayashi (JPN)	0
0	Nasser Zeinalnia (IRI)	4-0 ST	17-0	William Delgado (COL)	1
0	İlyas Şükrüoğlu (TUR)	3-1 PP	8-1	Amos Ojo (NGR)	1
0	Mohamed El-Messouti (SYR)			Bye	
Round 2
0	Mohamed El-Messouti (SYR)	3-1 PP	10-3	Alfredo Marcuño (ESP)	2
1	Tim Vanni (USA)	0-4 TF	1:48	Takashi Kobayashi (JPN)	0
0	Nasser Zeinalnia (IRI)	3-1 PP	4-3	İlyas Şükrüoğlu (TUR)	1
1	William Delgado (COL)	3-1 PP	8-6	Amos Ojo (NGR)	2
1	Lee Sang-Ho (KOR)			DNA	
Round 3
1	Mohamed El-Messouti (SYR)	.5-3.5 SP	1-13	Tim Vanni (USA)	1
0	Takashi Kobayashi (JPN)	4-0 TF	3:23	Nasser Zeinalnia (IRI)	1
2	William Delgado (COL)	1-3 PP	6-9	İlyas Şükrüoğlu (TUR)	1
Round 4
2	Mohamed El-Messouti (SYR)	0-4 ST	0-15	Takashi Kobayashi (JPN)	0
1	Tim Vanni (USA)	4-0 TF	4:25	Nasser Zeinalnia (IRI)	2
1	İlyas Şükrüoğlu (TUR)			Bye	
Round 5
2	İlyas Şükrüoğlu (TUR)	1-3 PP	3-5	Tim Vanni (USA)	1
0	Takashi Kobayashi (JPN)			Bye	
Round 6
0	Takashi Kobayashi (JPN)	3-1 PP	6-5	İlyas Şükrüoğlu (TUR)	3
1	Tim Vanni (USA)			Bye	

Wrestler	L	ER	CP
Takashi Kobayashi (JPN)	0	-	19
Tim Vanni (USA)	1	-	14.5
İlyas Şükrüoğlu (TUR)	3	6	9
Nasser Zeinalnia (IRI)	2	4	7
Mohamed El-Messouti (SYR)	2	4	3.5
William Delgado (COL)	2	3	4
Amos Ojo (NGR)	2	2	2
Alfredo Marcuño (ESP)	2	2	1
Lee Sang-Ho (KOR)	1	1	0

=== Final round ===
	CP	TP	
7th place match
Volker Anger (GDR)	4-0 DQ		Nasser Zeinalnia (IRI)
5th place match
Reiner Heugabel (FRG)	3-0 P1	4:27	İlyas Şükrüoğlu (TUR)
Bronze medal match
Sergey Karamchakov (URS)	3-1 PP	3-1	Tim Vanni (USA)
Gold medal match
Ivan Tsonov (BUL)	.5-3.5 SP	4-16	Takashi Kobayashi (JPN)

== Final standings ==
1. Takashi Kobayashi (JPN)
2. Ivan Tsonov (BUL)
3. Sergey Karamchakov (URS)
4. Tim Vanni (USA)
5. Reiner Heugabel (FRG)
6. İlyas Şükrüoğlu (TUR)
7. Volker Anger (GDR)
