= Lee Sang-ho =

Lee Sang-ho (Korean: 이상호) is a Korean name consisting of the family name Lee and the given name Sang-ho. It may refer to:

- Lee Sang-ho (wrestler) (born 1963), South Korean freestyle wrestler
- Lee Sang-ho (footballer, born 1981), South Korean footballer for Jeju United
- Lee Sang-ho (footballer, born 1987), South Korean footballer for FC Seoul
- Lee Sang-ho (snowboarder) (born 1995), South Korean snowboarder
