= Suryadi =

Suryadi is a common Indonesian Javanese name.

Suryadi or Soerjadi may refer to:

- Suryadi (judge), former Chief Justice of the Supreme Court of Indonesia
- Suryadi (politician) (1939–2016), chairman of the Indonesian Democratic Party
- Linus Suryadi AG (1951–1999), Indonesian writer
- Suryadi Gunawan (born 1966), Indonesian wrestler
