= Gymnastics at the 1988 Summer Olympics – Women's floor =

Women's floor at the Games of the XXIV Olympiad
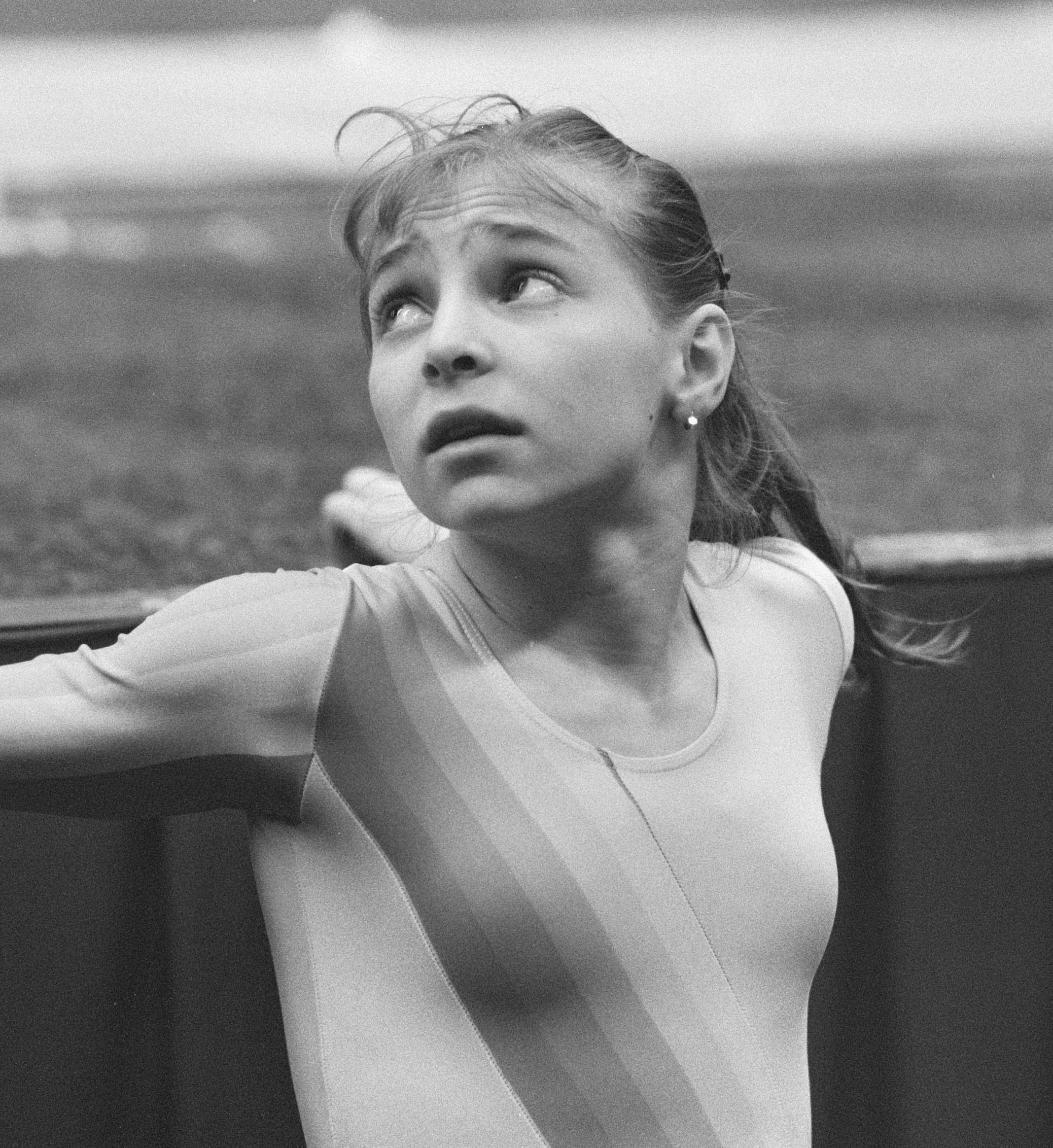
- Gold medalist Daniela Silivaş (1987)

Medalists
1st place, gold medalist(s)		Daniela Silivaş	Romania
2nd place, silver medalist(s)		Svetlana Boginskaya	Soviet Union
3rd place, bronze medalist(s)		Diana Doudeva	Bulgaria

These are the results of the women's floor competition, one of six events for female competitors in artistic gymnastics at the 1988 Summer Olympics in Seoul. The qualification and final rounds took place on September 19, 21 and 25th at the Olympic Gymnastics Hall.

== Results ==
=== Qualification ===
Eighty-four gymnasts competed in the floor event during the compulsory and optional rounds on September 19 and 21. The eight highest scoring gymnasts advanced to the final on September 25. Each country was limited to two competitors in the final. Half of the points earned by each gymnast during both the compulsory and optional rounds carried over to the final. This constitutes the "prelim" score.

=== Final ===
Rank	GymnastGymnast	C	O	C+O	Prelim	Final	Total
Gold medal	Daniela Silivaş (ROU)	10.000	9.900	19.900	9.950	9.987	19.937
Silver medal	Svetlana Boginskaya (URS)	9.900	9.925	19.825	9.912	9.975	19.887
Bronze medal	Diana Doudeva (BUL)	9.900	9.900	19.800	9.900	9.950	19.850
4	Deliana Vodenitcharova (BUL)	9.850	9.900	19.750	9.875	9.962	19.837
5	Beata Storczer (HUN)	9.850	9.900	19.750	9.875	9.800	19.675
6	Phoebe Mills (USA)	9.900	9.900	19.800	9.900	9.762	19.662
7	Elena Shushunova (URS)	9.900	10.000	19.900	9.950	9.625	19.575
8	Dörte Thümmler (GDR)	9.900	9.950	19.850	9.925	9.600	19.525
