= Rowing at the 1988 Summer Olympics – Women's coxless pair =

Women's coxless pairs at the Games of the XXIV Olympiad
- Venue: Han River Regatta Course
- Date: 19–24 September 1988
- Competitors: 20 from 10 nations
- Winning time: 7:28.13

Medalists
1st place, gold medalist(s)		Rodica Arba; Olga Homeghi	Romania
2nd place, silver medalist(s)		Radka Stoyanova; Lalka Berberova	Bulgaria
3rd place, bronze medalist(s)		Nikki Payne; Lynley Hannen	New Zealand

The women's coxless pairs rowing competition at the 1988 Summer Olympics took place at the Han River Regatta Course in Seoul, Korea. The event was held from 19 to 24 September.

== Background ==
The Romanian rower Rodica Arba had competed in the event since the 1981 season, and dominated it—with different partners—since the 1984 Summer Olympics in Los Angeles, where she won gold with Elena Horvat. She gained the 1985 World Rowing Championships title with Horvat, and won the 1986 and 1987 World Rowing Championships with Olga Homeghi. Arba and Homeghi were the only team favoured to have a chance of winning the event at the 1988 Olympics. The East German rowers were regarded as medal contenders, as they had gained medals in the event at the last three World Championships. Canada were the reigning Pan American champions.

=== Previous W2- competitions ===
Competition	Gold	Silver	Bronze
1980 Summer Olympics	East Germany	Poland	Bulgaria
1981 World Rowing Championships	East Germany	Canada	Romania
1982 World Rowing Championships	East Germany	Poland	Canada
1983 World Rowing Championships	East Germany	Romania	Canada
1984 Summer Olympics	Romania	Canada	West Germany
1985 World Rowing Championships	Romania	United States	East Germany
1986 World Rowing Championships	Romania	Soviet Union	East Germany
1987 World Rowing Championships	Romania	East Germany	Soviet Union

== Results ==
=== Heats ===
==== Heat 1 ====
Rank	Rower	Country	Time	Notes
1	Katrin Schröder; Kerstin Spittler	East Germany	7:59.10	FA
2	Lynley Hannen; Nikki Payne	New Zealand	8:02.39	R
3	Mara Keggi; Barbara Kirch	United States	8:16.85	R
4	Marina Smorodina; Sarmīte Stone	Soviet Union	8:23.68	R
5	Gong Jeong-bae; Lee Byeong-in	South Korea	8:34.90	R

==== Heat 2 ====
Rank	Rower	Country	Time	Notes
1	Rodica Arba; Olga Homeghi	Romania	7:42.53	FA
2	Radka Stoyanova; Lalka Berberova	Bulgaria	7:48.68	R
3	Kirsten Barnes; Sarah Ann Ogilvie	Canada	8:09.51	R
4	Alison Bonner; Kim Thomas	Great Britain	8:14.52	R
5	Bettina Kämpf; Cordula Keller	West Germany	8:19.76	R

=== Repechage ===
==== Heat 1 ====
Rank	Rower	Country	Time	Notes
1	Lynley Hannen; Nikki Payne	New Zealand	7:59.93	FA
2	Marina Smorodina; Sarmīte Stone	Soviet Union	8:07.67	FA
3	Kirsten Barnes; Sarah Ann Ogilvie	Canada	8:11.49	FB
4	Bettina Kämpf; Cordula Keller	West Germany	8:20.13	FB

==== Heat 2 ====
Rank	Rower	Country	Time	Notes
1	Radka Stoyanova; Lalka Berberova	Bulgaria	7:50.94	FA
2	Mara Keggi; Barbara Kirch	United States	8:05.55	FA
3	Alison Bonner; Kim Thomas	Great Britain	8:13.13	FB
4	Gong Jeong-Bae; Lee Byeong-In	South Korea	8:18.62	FB

=== Finals ===
==== B final ====
Rank	Rower	Country	Time
7	Kirsten Barnes; Sarah Ann Ogilvie	Canada	8:09.10
8	Alison Bonner; Kim Thomas	Great Britain	8:15.20
9	Bettina Kämpf; Cordula Keller	West Germany	8:22.08
10	Gong Jeong-Bae; Lee Byeong-In	South Korea	8:25.14

==== A final ====
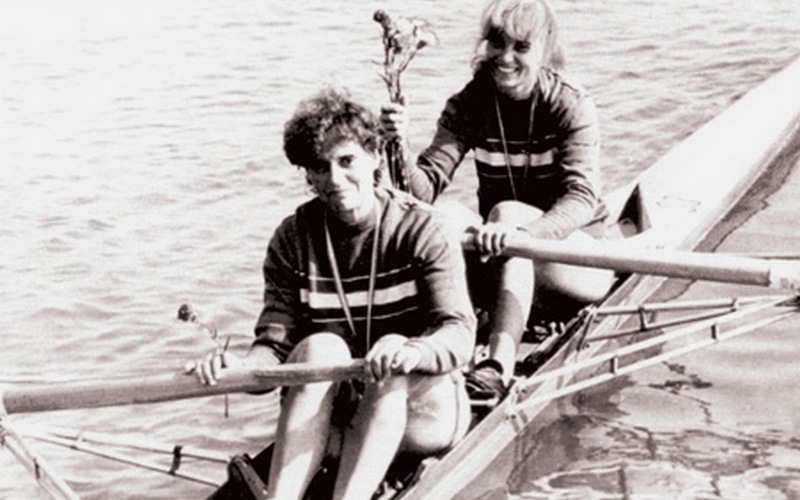
Olga Homeghi (stroke) and Rodica Arba after winning gold at the 1988 Summer Olympics

Rank	Rower	Country	Time
1st place, gold medalist(s)	Rodica Arba; Olga Homeghi	Romania	7:28.13
2nd place, silver medalist(s)	Radka Stoyanova; Lalka Berberova	Bulgaria	7:31.95
3rd place, bronze medalist(s)	Nikki Payne; Lynley Hannen	New Zealand	7:35.68
4	Kerstin Spittler; Katrin Schröder	East Germany	7:40.47
5	Sarmīte Stone; Marina Smorodina	Soviet Union	7:53.19
6	Barbara Kirch; Mara Keggi	United States	7:56.27
