= Lynley Hannen =

New Zealand rower

Personal information
- Born: 27 August 1964 (age 62)
- Spouse: Bill Coventry
Medal record
Women's rowing
Representing New Zealand
Olympic Games
Bronze medal – third place	1988 Seoul	Women's coxless pair

Lynley Coventry (born 27 August 1964), much better known under her maiden name Lynley Hannen, is a former New Zealand rower.

Hannen was born in Dunedin. She trained with Nikki Payne under the guidance of coach Harry Mahon. Although they had won the national pairs title twice in a row, they were overlooked for Olympic selection. Still novices on the international stage in 1988, they went to Europe on their own initiative to be with their coach. They did well in regattas, but were also working and saving up for a holiday in Greece. When they came second at the World Rowing Cup at Rotsee in Lucerne, they were called up not long before the 1988 Summer Olympics in Seoul.

Hannen and Payne had improved over a short time. At Lucerne, they were beaten by the East German team by 14 seconds. In Seoul, the New Zealand pair competed against the East Germans in the qualifying heat of the coxless pair event, and this time, the winning margin of the East Germans was down to three seconds. The New Zealanders won their repechage and thus qualified for the A final, where they came third, putting a five-second margin between themselves and the East German team in fourth place. New Zealand's bronze medal was entirely unexpected.

At the 1989 World Rowing Championships in Bled, Yugoslavia, Payne and Hannen came sixth in the coxless pair. At the 1990 World Rowing Championships in Tasmania, Australia, Hannen competed in two events. She came fourth with the women's eight, and sixth with the women's coxless four. At the 1991 World Rowing Championships in Vienna, Austria, Hannen came eights with the women's eight.

Hannen later married fellow Olympic rower Bill Coventry and took on his name. The couple have four children and now live in Nelson.
