= Cordula Keller =

German rower

Personal information
- Nationality: German
- Born: 21 June 1968 (age 56); Frankfurt, Germany

Sport
- Sport: Rowing

Cordula Keller (born 21 June 1968) is a German rower. She competed in the women's coxless pair event at the 1988 Summer Olympics.
