= Marina Smorodina =

Soviet rower

Personal information
- Nationality: Soviet
- Born: 7 April 1966 (age 58)

Sport
- Sport: Rowing

Marina Smorodina (born 7 April 1966) is a Soviet rower. She competed in the women's coxless pair event at the 1988 Summer Olympics.
