= İlyas Şükrüoğlu =

Turkish wrestler (born 1966)

Personal information
- Nationality: Turkish
- Born: 1966 (age 59–60) Kardzhali, Bulgaria

Sport
- Sport: Wrestling
Medal record
Freestyle wrestling
Representing Turkey
Mediterranean Games
Gold medal – first place	1991 Athens	-48 Kg
European Wrestling Championships
Silver medal – second place	1993 Istanbul	-48 kg
Silver medal – second place	1989 Ankara	-48 kg

İlyas Şükrüoğlu (born 1966) is a Turkish Olympic wrestler competing in the light flyweight (-48 kg) division. He holds two European silver medals and one gold medal at the Mediterranean Games. He was born as an ethnic Turk in Bulgaria, and emigrated to Turkey.

== Early life ==
İlyas Şükrüoğlu was born to an ethnic Turkish family in Kardzhali, Bulgaria in 1966. He started wrestling in 1975. He defected and emigrated to Turkey after he escaped from the Bulgarian national wrestling team during a trip in Canada for international competitions. Currently, he lives in Bursa, Turkey.

== Career ==
He competed for Turkey in the men's freestyle 48 kg at the 1988 Summer Olympics in Seoul, South Korea, where he placed sixth. He competed at the World Wrestling Championships in 1989 in Switzerland, 1990 in Japan and 1993 in Canada placing 4th, 10th and 4th respectively. He became the silver medalist of the 1989 European Wrestling Championships in Ankara and 1993 European Wrestling Championships in Istanbul, Turkey. He placed fifth at the 1991 European Championships in Stuttgart, Germany. He won the gold medal at the 1991 Mediterranean Games held in Athens, Greece.

After his retirement, he served as a coach in the 2000s.
