= Kerstin Spittler =

East German rower

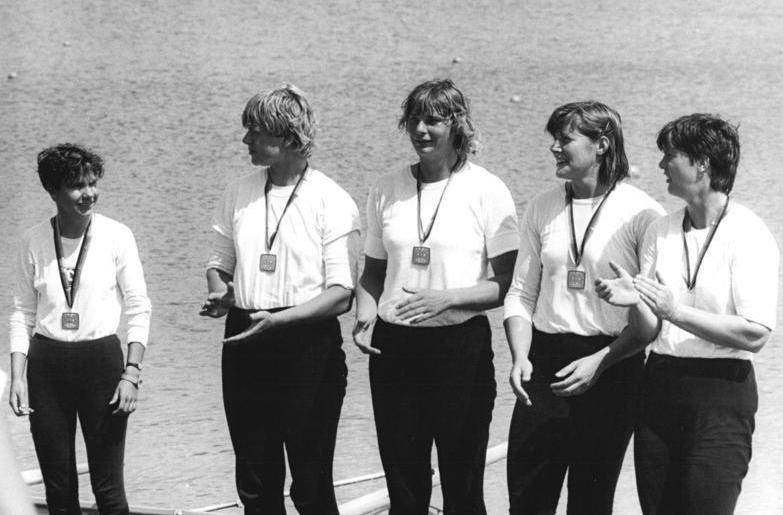
- Spittler (2nd from left) in 1985

Personal information
- Born: 16 December 1963 (age 62) Waldenburg, Germany
- Height: 1.83 m (6 ft 0 in)
- Weight: 78 kg (172 lb)

Sport
- Sport: Rowing
- Club: SG Dynamo Potsdam
Medal record
Representing East Germany
World Rowing Championships
Gold medal – first place	1985 Hazewinkel	Coxed four
Silver medal – second place	1986 Nottingham	Coxed four

Kerstin Spittler (born 16 December 1963) is a retired East German rower who won a gold and a silver medal in the coxed four boat class at the world championships in 1985 and 1986, respectively. In October 1986, she was awarded a Patriotic Order of Merit in gold (first class) for her sporting success. She competed at the 1988 Summer Olympics in the coxless pair, together with Katrin Schröder, and finished in fourth place.
