= Bettina Kämpf =

German rower

Personal information
- Nationality: German
- Born: 13 May 1967 (age 57); Frankfurt, Germany

Sport
- Sport: Rowing

Bettina Kämpf (born 13 May 1967) is a German rower. She competed in the women's coxless pair event at the 1988 Summer Olympics.
