= Cherven Bryag =

Cherven bryag Червен бряг
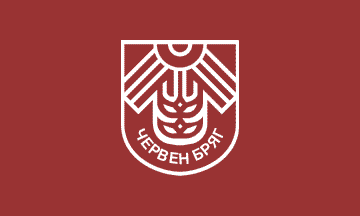
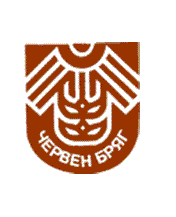
- Flag Coat of arms

- Location of Cherven Bryag
- Coordinates: 43°16′46″N 24°4′59″E
- Country: Bulgaria
- Province (Oblast): Pleven
- Elevation: 187 m (614 ft)

Population (31.12.2009)
  - Total: 13,856
- Time zone: UTC+2 (EET)
  - Summer (DST): UTC+3 (EEST)
- Postal Code: 5980
- Area code: 0659

Cherven Bryag (Bulgarian: Червен бряг, pronounced [t͡ʃɛrˈvɛn ˌbrʲag]) is a town in northern Bulgaria, a capital of the Cherven Bryag municipality, Pleven Province. It is situated on the right shore of the Zlatna Panega in river Iskar, 137 km northeast of Sofia, 53 km south-west of Pleven, 12 km northwest of Lukovit, 56 km east of Vratsa, and 55 km south of Oryahovo. The name means "red shore" and refers to the reddish clay in the vicinity of the river. As of December 2009, the town had a population of 13,856.

Cherven Bryag is a medieval settlement mentioned in 1431 in Ottoman registers as Dobrolak. Under its present name Cherven Bryag was first recorded in the 16th century as part of the Ottoman region of Nikopol. On 26 June 1929, Prime Minister Andrey Lyapchev proclaimed the former village and station a town.

Cherven Bryag is a railway station on the line Sofia-Gorna Oryahovitsa-Varna/Ruse. It first appeared as a railway station settlement in 1899 on the newly built Sofia-Varna railway line. Cherven Bryag was a starting point of a narrow-gauge railway line to Byala Slatina and Oryahovo, as well as of a normal railway line to Lukovit and Zlatna Panega. Today those lines are no more, out of service. The railway station is in the southwestern end of the town, opposite the central area.

Among the local landmarks, the St. Sophronius of Vratsa Church located in the central part of the town is notable.

== Notable people ==
- Lyuben Dilov (1927-2008), writer, translator, editor
- Margarita Lilowa (1935–2012), Austrian opera singer
- Daniel Pavlov (born 1967), athlete
- Tsvetomira Filipova (born 1969), rhythmic gymnast
- Lyubomir Neikov (born 1972), actor and comedian

== Gallery ==
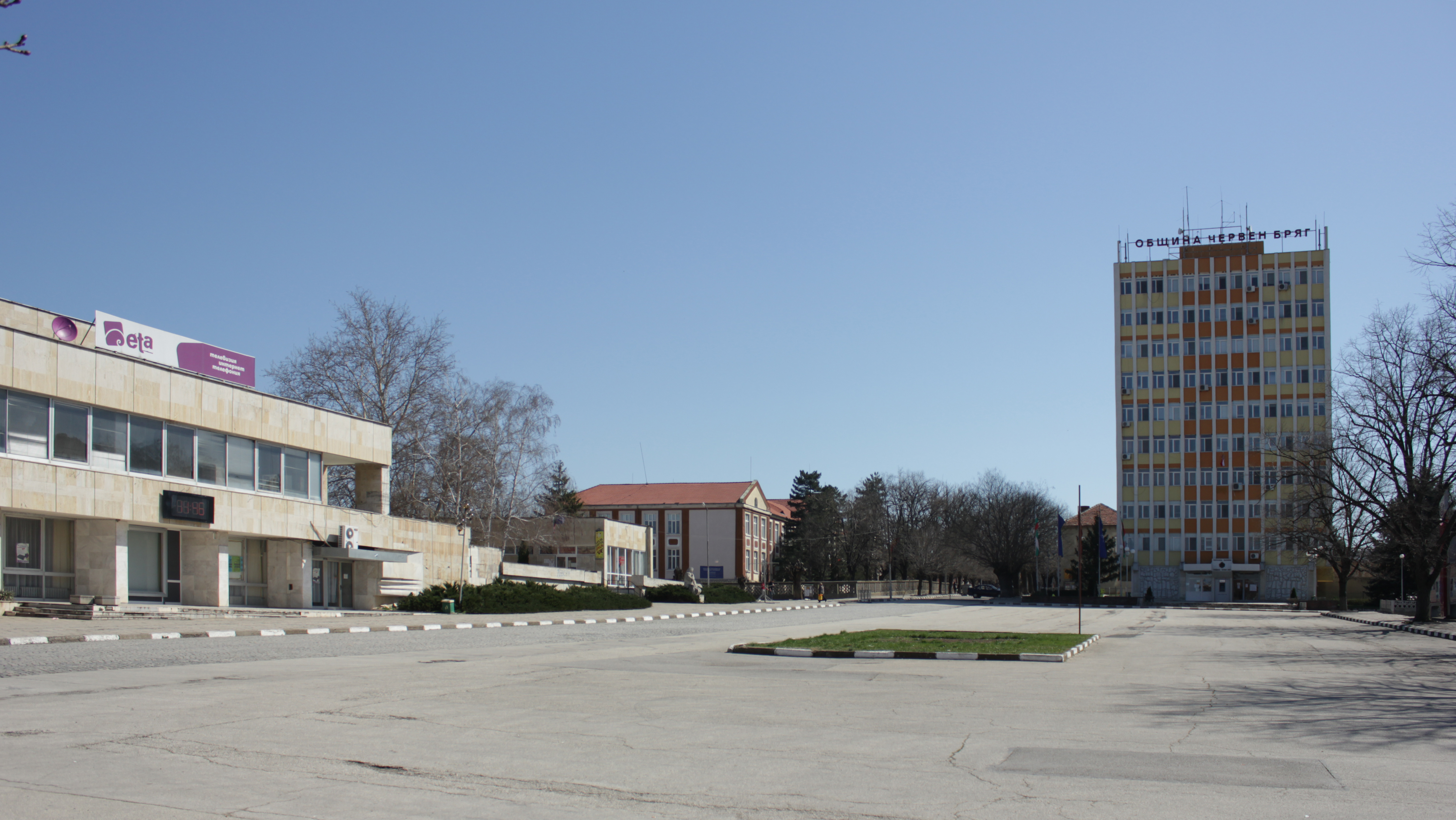
The Central Square with the Cherven Bryag Municipality Building

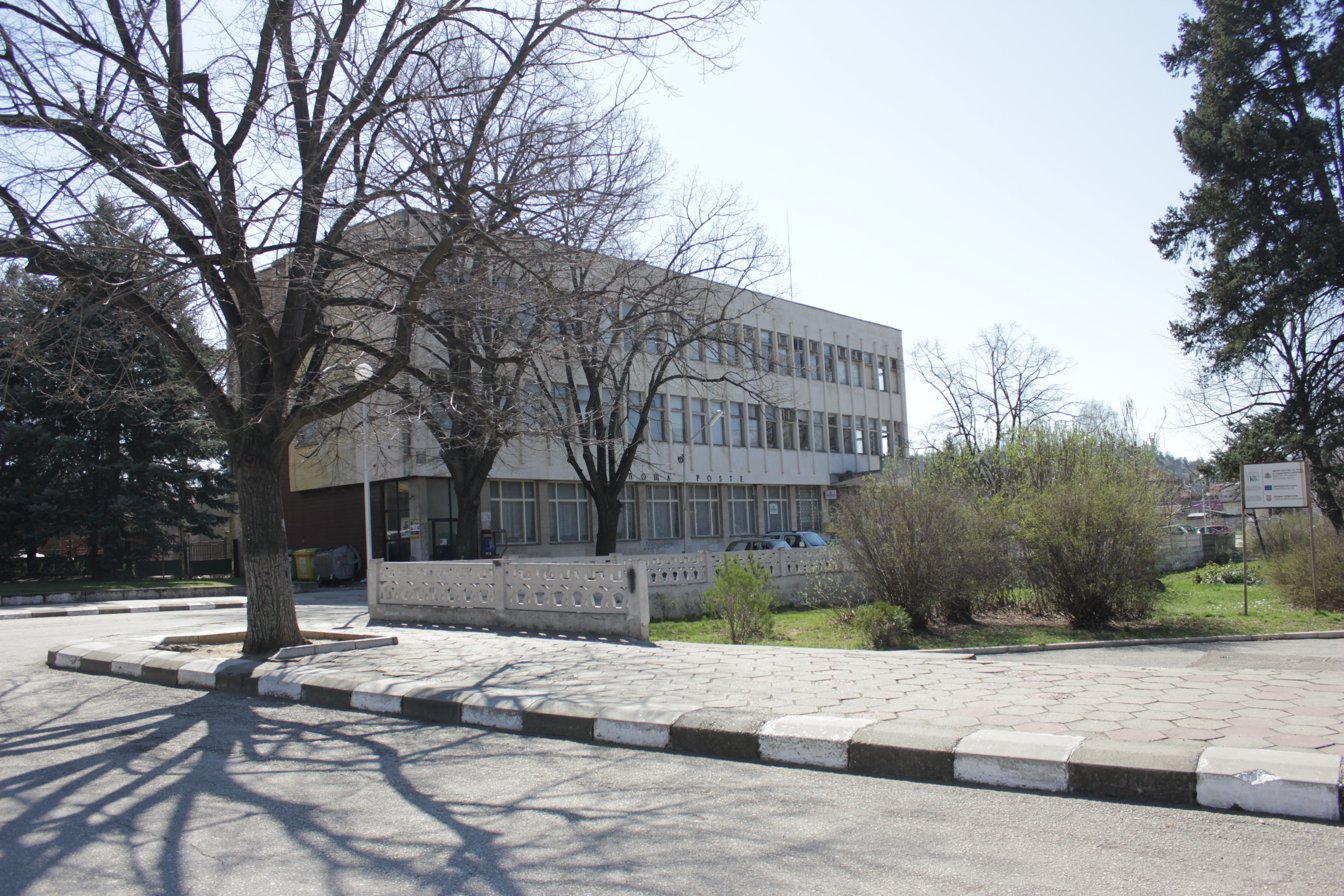
The Post Office

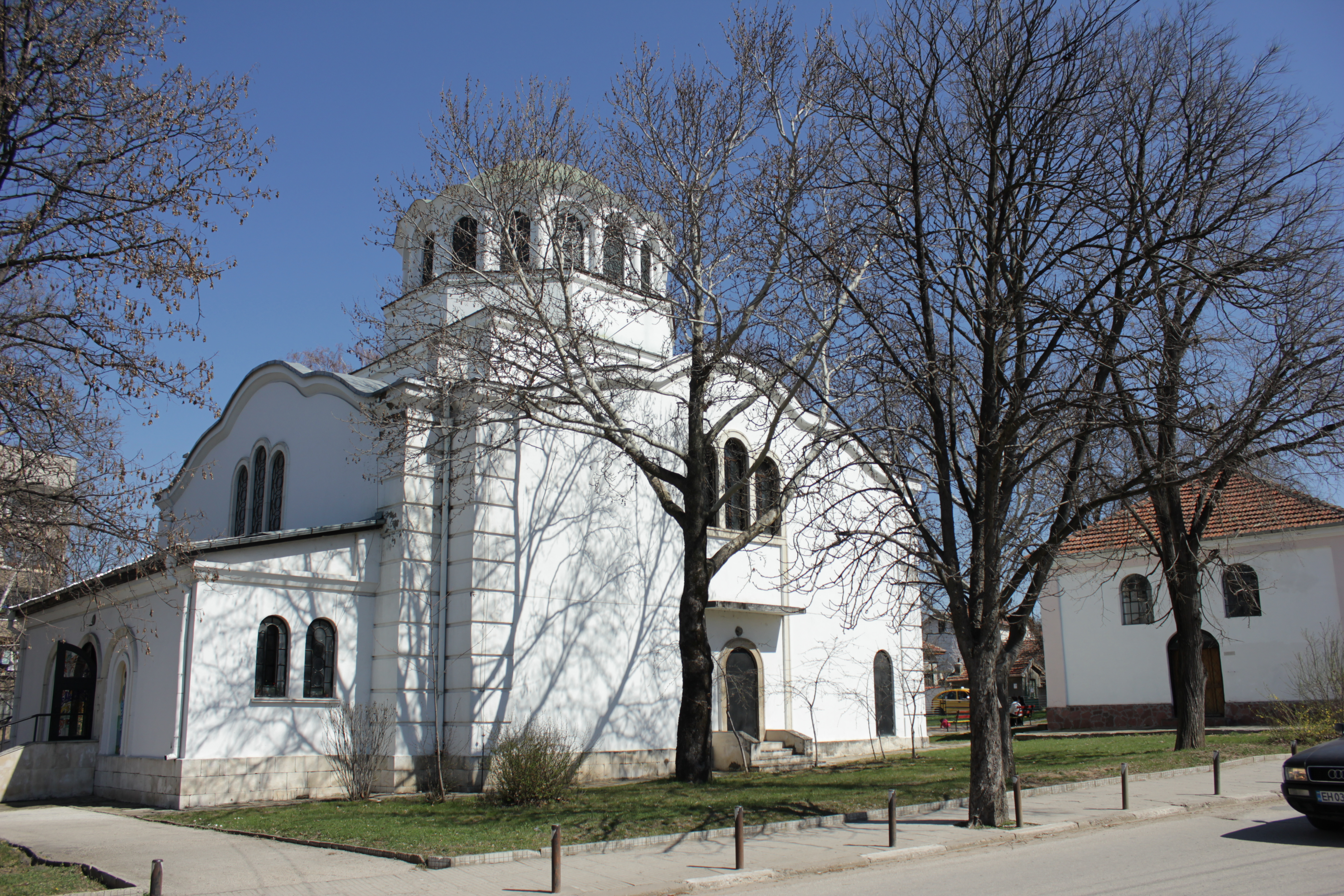
Saint Sophronius of Vratsa Church in Cherven Bryag

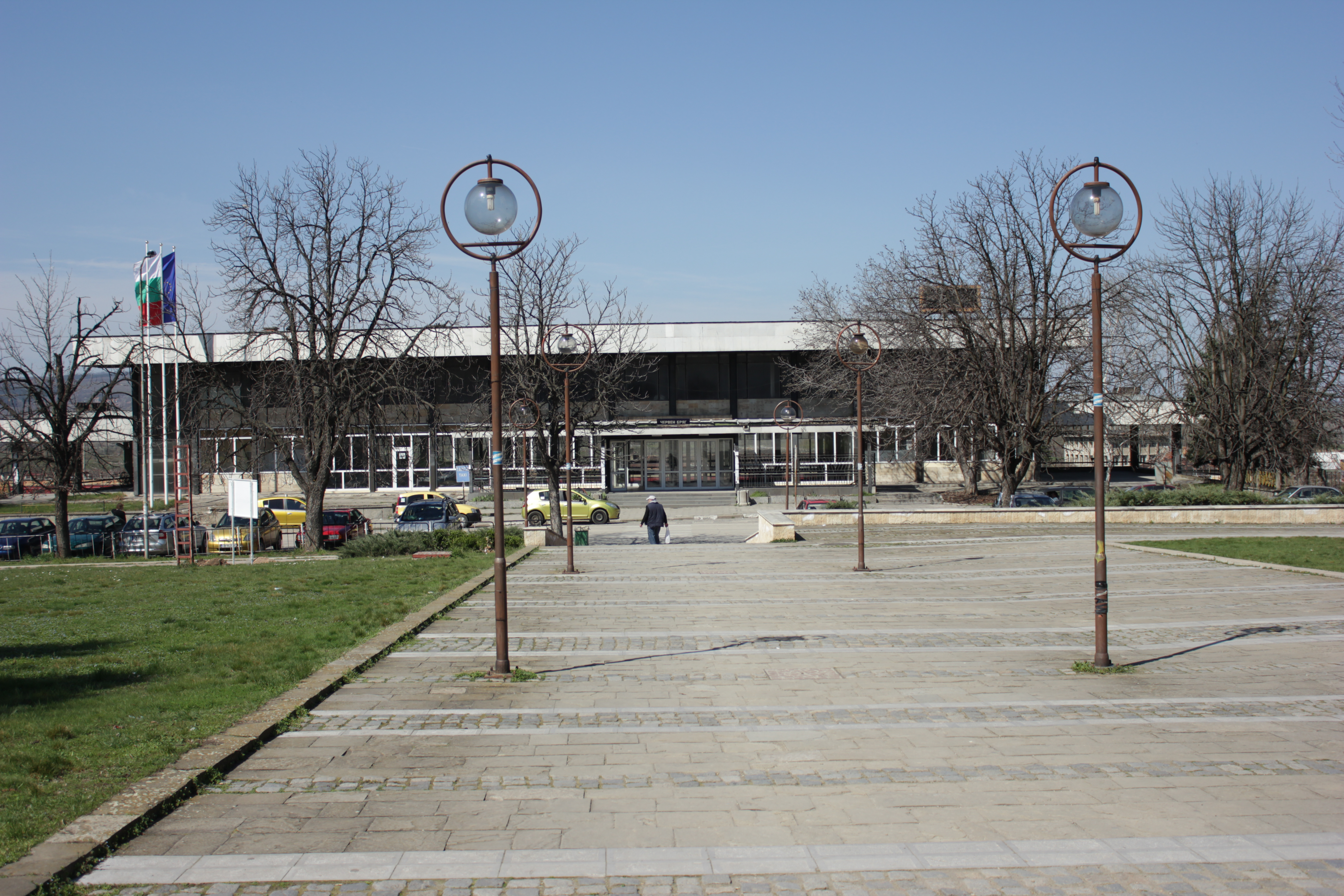
The Cherven Bryag railway station

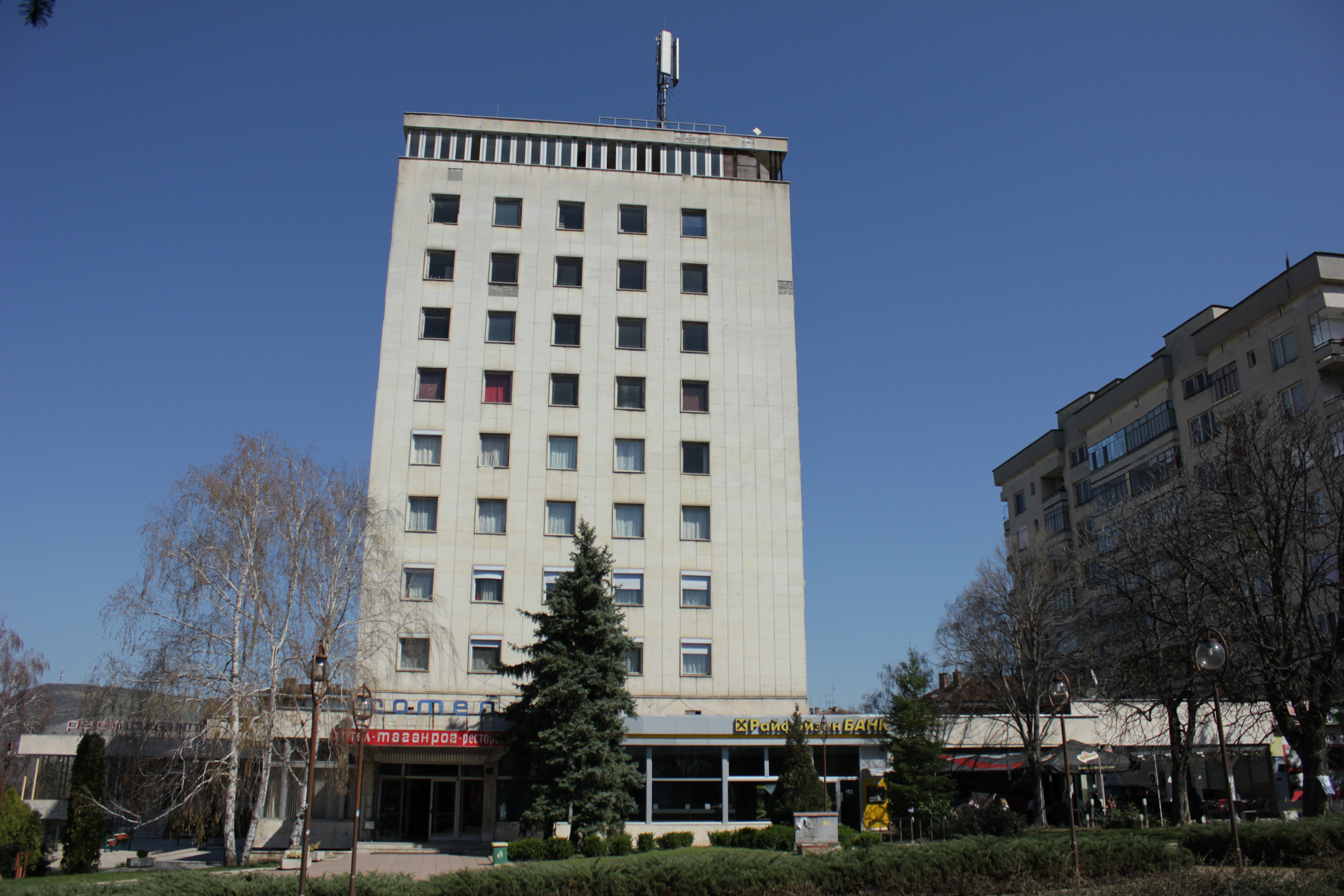
Taganrog Hotel in Cherven Bryag
