= Mohamed El-Messouti =

Syrian wrestler

Personal information
- Nationality: Syrian
- Born: 15 October 1963 (age 62)

Sport
- Sport: Wrestling

Mohamed El-Messouti (Arabic: محمد المسعوتي; born 15 October 1963) is a Syrian wrestler. He competed in the men's freestyle 48 kg at the 1988 Summer Olympics.
