= Alfredo Marcuño =

Spanish wrestler

Personal information
- Nationality: Spanish
- Born: 9 February 1961 (age 65)
- Height: 160 cm (5 ft 3 in)
- Weight: 48 kg (106 lb)

Sport
- Sport: Wrestling

Alfredo Marcuño (born 9 February 1961) is a Spanish wrestler. He competed in the men's freestyle 48 kg at the 1988 Summer Olympics.
