= Tümendembereliin Sükhbaatar =

Mongolian wrestler

Personal information
- Nationality: Mongolian
- Born: 1 March 1964 (age 62)

Sport
- Sport: Wrestling

Tümendembereliin Sükhbaatar (born 1 March 1964) is a Mongolian wrestler. He competed in the men's freestyle 48 kg at the 1988 Summer Olympics.
