= William Delgado (wrestler) =

Colombian wrestler (born 1966)

Personal information
- Nationality: Colombian
- Born: 22 September 1966 (age 59)

Sport
- Sport: Wrestling

William Delgado (born 22 September 1966) is a Colombian wrestler. He competed in the men's freestyle 48 kg at the 1988 Summer Olympics.
