= Barbara Kirch =

American rower

Personal information
- Full name: Barbara Ann Kirch Grudt
- Born: May 2, 1960 (age 66) Abington, Pennsylvania, U.S.
- Height: 6 ft 0 in (183 cm)
- Weight: 170 lb (77 kg)
Medal record
Women's Rowing
Representing United States
World Championships
Silver medal – second place	1982 Lucerne	W4+
Bronze medal – third place	1987 Copenhagen	W2x

Barbara Kirch (born May 2, 1960, in Abington, Pennsylvania) an American Olympic rower who competed in both the 1984 and 1988 Olympic coxless pair contests. In the 1988 Olympics, she competed with Mara Keggi. Kirch graduated from the University of Pennsylvania in 1984 with a B.A. Degree. After the Olympics, she eventually became the head rowing coach for the Penn Women's Rowing Team. Later, she joined the Peddie Crew team as the Head Woman's Coach.
