= Kristaps Keggi =

Latvian orthopedic surgeon (1934–2023)

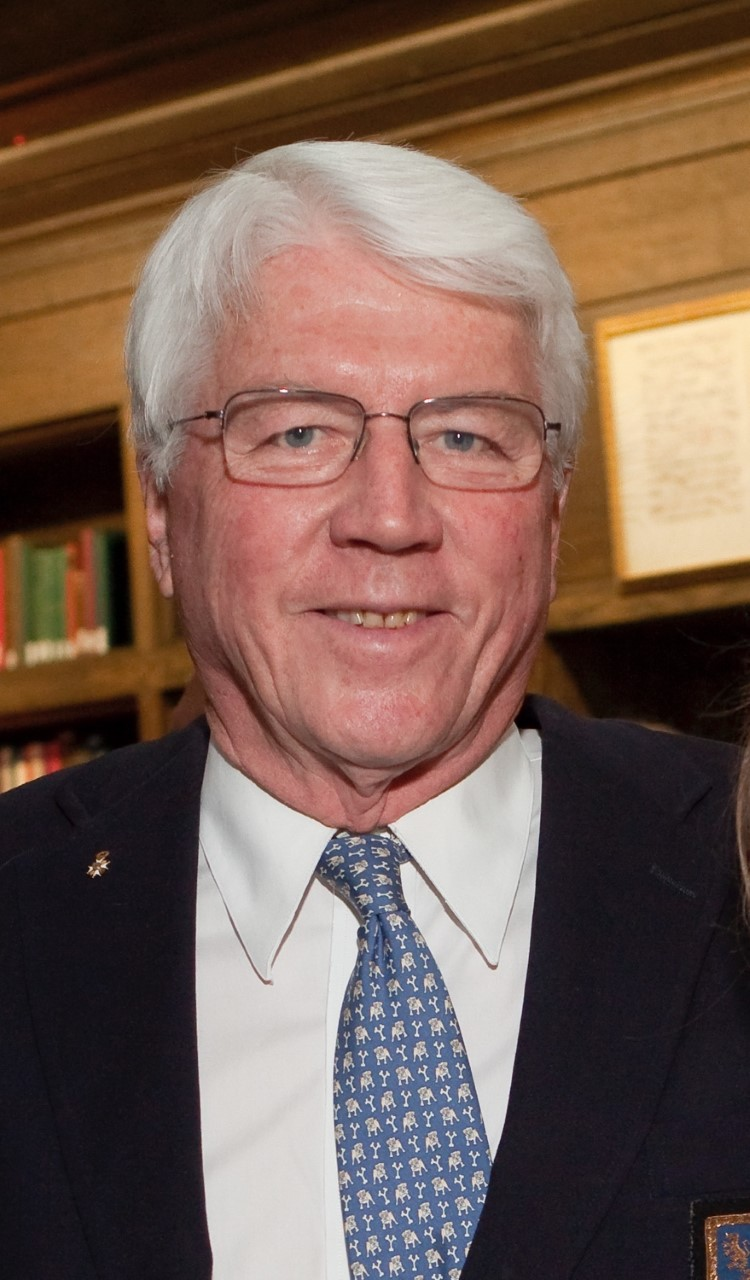
Dr. Kristaps Keggi

Kristaps Juris Keggi (August 9, 1934 – July 4, 2023) was a Latvian-American orthopedic surgeon. He was considered to be the pioneer of the anterior approach to total hip replacement. Keggi was the recipient of multiple national and international awards and four honorary doctorates.

== Biography ==
Kristaps Keggi was born in Riga, Latvia on August 9, 1934, in the family of surgeon Jānis Kegi. His grandfather was a folklorist, teacher and pastor Ludis Bērziņš (1870–1965). During World War II, he fled with his family to Germany in 1944, and moved to the United States in 1949. He studied medicine at Yale University (1951–1959) and was a resident at the Roosevelt Hospital in New York and at Yale-New Haven Hospital. From 1965 to 1966 he participated in the Vietnam War as a military doctor. Keggi was stationed with the 173rd Airborne as chief of surgery at the 3rd Mobile Army Surgical Hospital in Biên Hòa, Vietnam. In 1966, he joined Yale University as an assistant professor.

In 1989, he became a clinical professor of orthopaedics and rehabilitation at Yale University. In 2008, he was elected full professor in the Department of Orthopaedics and Rehabilitation at Yale, and in 2010 he was named Elihu professor of orthopaedics and rehabilitation.

Keggi served as senior research scientist at the Yale School of Medicine and as the director of Yale-New Haven Hospital's Joint Replacement Center and of Waterbury Hospital's Orthopaedic Center for Joint Reconstruction.

Keggi practiced orthopaedic surgery at both St. Mary's Hospital (1969–1989) and Waterbury Hospital (1969–2018).

From 1987, he regularly visited Latvia, where he performed demonstration operations, conducted seminars, and gave lectures. In 1988, he founded the non-profit Keggi Orthopaedic Foundation to allow for formal academic exchanges between the United States and the USSR. The organization has provided fellowships in advanced orthopaedic surgery at the Yale School of Medicine and at Waterbury Hospital for more than 300 surgeons from the Baltic nations, Russia, and Vietnam. In 1990, he founded the memorial museum of his grandfather Luda Bērziņš in Jūrmala. He established the "Keggi Velo," a bike race in memory of his father. He was the founder of the Luda Bērziņš Prize.

Keggi's daughters were successful in sports. Mara Keggi participated in the 1988 Summer Olympics in rowing competitions, while Caroline Keggi participated in LPGA Tour golf tournaments.

Keggi died on July 4, 2023, at the age of 88.

== Publications ==
Keggi studied major joint replacement, spinal diseases and wound treatment. He is the author and co-author of numerous publications including:

- Flanagin BA, Dushey CH, Rubin LE, Keggi KJ. Total hip arthroplasty followed by traction and delayed reduction for Crowe IV developmental dysplasia of the hip. J Arthroplasty. 2013 Jun; 28(6):1052-4.
- Oetgen ME, Huo MH, Keggi KJ. Revision total hip arthroplasty using the Zweymuller femoral stem. J Orthop Traumatol. 2008 Jun;9(2):57-62
- Grauer JN, Keggi JM, Keggi KJ. Superior mesenteric vein tear with total hip arthroplasty. J Arthroplasty. 2001 Aug;16(5):671-3.
- Huo MH, Solberg BD, Zatorski LE, Keggi KJ. Total hip replacements done without cement after acetabular fractures: a 4- to 8-year follow-up study. J Arthroplasty. 1999 Oct;14(7):827-31.
- Lorenze M, Huo MH, Zatorski LE, Keggi KJ. A comparison of the cost effectiveness of one-stage versus two-stage bilateral total hip replacement. Orthopedics. 1998 Dec;21(12):1249-52.
- Hoffinger SA, Keggi KJ, Zatorski LE. Primary ceramic hip replacement: a prospective study of 119 hips. Orthopedics. 1991 May;14(5):523-31.
- Clark CR, Keggi KJ, Panjabi MM. Methylmethacrylate stabilization of the cervical spine. J Bone Joint Surg Am. 1984 Jan;66(1):40-6.
- Fulkerson JP, Crelin ES, Keggi KJ. Anatomy and osteotomy of the greater trochanter. Arch Surg. 1979 Jan;114(1):19-21.
- Kelsey JL, Keggi KJ. An epidemiological study of the effect of fluorides in drinking water on the frequency of slipped capital femoral epiphysis. Yale J Biol Med. 1971 Dec;44(3):274-85.
- Keggi KJ, Audette LG. Portable television in medicine and medical education. J Med Educ. 1970 Apr;45(4):258-9.

Keggi was the co-author of The Direct Anterior Approach to Hip Reconstruction (2016).

== Awards ==
Keggi received the Latvian Order of the Three Stars in 1993, the V Class Order of the Estonian Red Cross in 1999, the Distinguished Service Medal of the Latvian Physicians Association (the second ever awarded) in 2009 and the Silver Medal of Medical Dignity and Service to Russian Medicine in 2012. He received the George H.W. Bush Lifetime of Leadership Award from Yale University in 2005. In 1994, the Pauls Stradiņš Museum of the History of Medicine and the LAS awarded him the Pauls Stradiņš Prize.

Keggi was an Honorary Member of the Latvian Academy of Sciences (1990) and the Russian Academy of Sciences (1993) and an Honorary Doctor of Riga Stradiņš University (1997) and the University of Latvia (2009).
