= Sarah Ann Ogilvie =

Canadian rower

Personal information
- Nationality: Canadian
- Born: 10 April 1959 (age 66) Seattle, Washington, United States

Sport
- Sport: Rowing

Sarah Ann Ogilvie (born 10 April 1959) is a Canadian former rower. She competed in the women's coxless pair event at the 1988 Summer Olympics.
