= Katrin Schröder =

East German rower

Personal information
- Born: 10 July 1967 (age 58) Magdeburg, East Germany
- Height: 1.84 m (6 ft 0 in)
- Weight: 79 kg (174 lb)

Sport
- Sport: Rowing
- Club: SC Magdeburg
Medal record
Representing East Germany
World Rowing Championships
Silver medal – second place	1989 Bled	Eights

Katrin Schröder (born 10 July 1967) is a retired East German rower who won a silver medal in the eights at the 1989 World Rowing Championships. She competed at the 1988 Summer Olympics in the coxless pairs, together with Kerstin Spittler, and finished in fourth place.
