= Lee Byung-in =

South Korean rower (born 1968)

Personal information
- Nationality: South Korean
- Born: 10 June 1968 (age 57)

Sport
- Sport: Rowing

Lee Byung-in (born 10 June 1968) is a South Korean rower. She competed in the women's coxless pair event at the 1988 Summer Olympics.
