= Nikki Payne (rower) =

New Zealand rower

Personal information
- Born: Nicola Payne; 26 July 1966 (age 59) Hong Kong
- Occupation: Doctor
Medal record
Women's rowing
Representing New Zealand
Olympic Games
Bronze medal – third place	1988 Seoul	Women's coxless pair

Nicola "Nikki" Payne (born 26 July 1966), also known as Nicola Mills and Nicola Payne-Mills, is a former New Zealand rower.

Payne was born in Hong Kong in 1966. At the 1984 World Rowing Junior Championships in Jönköping, Sweden, she came fourth in the single sculls.

She trained with Lynley Hannen under the guidance of coach Harry Mahon. Although they had won the national pairs title twice in a row, they were overlooked for Olympic selection. Still novices on the international elite stage in 1988, they went to Europe on their own initiative to be with their coach. They did well in regattas, but were also working and saving up for a holiday in Greece. When they came second at the World Rowing Cup at Rotsee in Lucerne, they were called up not long before the 1988 Summer Olympics in Seoul.

Hannen and Payne had improved over a short time. At Lucerne, they were beaten by the East German team by 14 seconds. In Seoul, the New Zealand pair competed against the East Germans in the qualifying heat of the coxless pair event, and this time, the winning margin of the East Germans was down to three seconds. The New Zealanders won their repechage and thus qualified for the A final, where they came third, putting a five second margin between themselves and the East German team in fourth place. New Zealand's bronze medal was entirely unexpected.

At the 1990 World Rowing Championships in Tasmania, Australia, Payne competed in two events. She came fourth with the women's eight, and sixth with the women's coxless four.

Payne later married Peter Mills, a rowing coach from her Waikato club. They had a daughter, although they have since separated. She trained as a doctor in New Zealand, and as of 2008 was completing a fellowship in paediatric ear nose and throat surgery in London.
