= Kong Jeong-bae =

South Korean rower (born 1968)

Personal information
- Nationality: South Korean
- Born: 8 January 1968 (age 57)

Sport
- Sport: Rowing

Kong Jeong-bae (born 8 January 1968) is a South Korean rower. She competed in the women's coxless pair event at the 1988 Summer Olympics.
