= Rajesh Kumar (wrestler) =

Indian wrestler

Personal information
- Nationality: Indian
- Born: 15 September 1969 (age 56)

Sport
- Sport: Wrestling

Rajesh Kumar (born 15 September 1969) is an Indian wrestler. He competed in the men's freestyle 48 kg at the 1988 Summer Olympics.
