= Volker Anger =

German wrestler

Personal information
- Nationality: German
- Born: 2 May 1968 (age 58) Berlin, Germany

Sport
- Sport: Wrestling

Volker Anger (born 2 May 1968) is a German wrestler. He competed in the men's freestyle 48 kg at the 1988 Summer Olympics.
