= Radka Stoyanova =

Bulgarian rower

Medal record

Women's rowing

Representing Bulgaria

Olympic Games
Silver medal – second place	1988 Seoul	Coxless pair

Radka Yordanova Stoyanova (Bulgarian: Радка Йорданова Стоянова; born 7 July 1964 in Varna) is a Bulgarian rower.
