= Nikolay Mateev =

Bulgarian fencer

Personal information
- Born: 3 February 1960 (age 66) Sofia, Bulgaria

Sport
- Sport: Fencing

Nikolay Mateev (Bulgarian: Николай Матеев, born 3 February 1960) is a Bulgarian fencer. He competed in the team sabre event at the 1988 Summer Olympics.
