= Lalka Berberova =

Bulgarian rower (1965–2006)

Personal information
- Born: 11 June 1965 Plovdiv, Bulgaria
- Died: 24 July 2006 (aged 41) Plovdiv, Bulgaria

Sport
- Sport: Rowing
Medal record
Representing Bulgaria
Olympic Games
Silver medal – second place	1988 Seoul	Coxless pair
Summer Universiade
Silver medal – second place	1987 Zagreb	Quadruple sculls

Lalka Stoyanova Berberova (Bulgarian: Лалка Стоянова Берберова; 11 June 1965 – 24 July 2006) was a Bulgarian rower. She was born in Plovdiv.
