= Sergey Karamchakov =

Soviet Union freestyle wrestler

Personal information
- Nationality: Soviet Union
- Born: 26 August 1962 Krasnoyarsk Krai, Soviet Union
- Died: 1 January 1993 (aged 30) Abakan, Khakassia, Soviet Union
- Height: 153 cm (5 ft 0 in)

Sport
- Country: Soviet Union
- Sport: Wrestling
- Weight class: 48 kg
- Event: Freestyle
Medal record
Representing Soviet Union
Olympic Games
Bronze medal – third place	1988 Seoul	48 kg
World Championships
Bronze medal – third place	1987 Clermont-Ferrand	48 kg
World Cup
Gold medal – first place	1988 Toledo	48 kg
Gold medal – first place	1987 Ulaanbaatar	48 kg
Gold medal – first place	1986 Toledo	48 kg
Silver medal – second place	1989 Toledo	48 kg

Sergey Zakharovich Karamchakov (August 26, 1962, Katanov, Krasnoyarsk Territory – 1993, Abakan) was a Soviet and Russian freestyle wrestler. He was a bronze medalist at the 1988 Summer Olympics in Seoul, and a Honored Master of Sports of Russia (1992).

== Biography ==
He was born in the aal Katanov, which is located 16 km from the village of Askiz.

From 1974, he began to engage in freestyle wrestling in the village Askiz with coaches M. F. Myltygashev and A. N. Adanakova. In 1978 he entered vocational school No. 20 of the city of Krasnoyarsk and continued his freestyle wrestling classes with coaches V. P. Zaitsev, V. N. Alginov, A. A. Okhapkin and D. G. Mindiashvili .

He was a Master of Sports of the USSR (1979), Master of Sports of the USSR of international class (1985), Honored Master of Sports of Russia (1992, certificate No. 13) in freestyle wrestling.

He was a bronze medalist of the XXIV Summer Olympic Games in 1988 in Seoul in the category up to 48 kg (light-flyweight).

He was a bronze medalist at the 1987 World Championship.

He was a two-time champion of the USSR (1987, 1990), two-time silver medalist of the USSR championships (1982, 1988), and a bronze medalist in 1989.

He was a winner of the World Cup in 1986, 1988, silver medalist of the World Cup in 1989.

He was a multiple winner and prize-winner of international competitions and tournaments (1982-1990).

In 1992, Sergei Karamchakov was seriously injured, was close to death, but the doctors still saved his life. The wrestler's career was close to its logical conclusion, but was resumed for a short time. In early 1993, he was preparing for the international tournament for the prizes of Ivan Yarygin, held in January, where he performed unsuccessfully. There were cases of violation of the sports regime.

He died under unexplained circumstances. The date and month of Sergei Karamchakov's death are unknown. It is only known that it was in 1993 and his body was found in the city of Abakan.

In memory of the athlete in Abakan, an All-Russian freestyle wrestling tournament is held.
