= Natasha Khristova =

Bulgarian swimmer

Personal information
- Born: 19 November 1969 (age 56)

Sport
- Sport: Swimming

Natasha Khristova (Bulgarian: Наташа Христова, born 19 November 1969) is a Bulgarian swimmer. She competed in two events at the 1988 Summer Olympics.
