= Sava Kovachev =

Bulgarian volleyball player (born 1969)

Personal information
- Nationality: Bulgarian
- Born: 10 April 1969 (age 55); Pazardzhik, Bulgaria

Sport
- Sport: Volleyball

Sava Kovachev (Bulgarian: Сава Ковачев, born 10 April 1969) is a Bulgarian volleyball player. He competed in the men's tournament at the 1988 Summer Olympics.
