= Mara Keggi =

American rower (born 1962)

Personal information
- Full name: Mara Walden Keggi
- Nationality: American
- Born: October 7, 1962 (age 62)
- Height: 5 ft 11 in (180 cm)
- Weight: 179 lb (81 kg)

Sport
- Country: United States
- Sport: Rowing

Mara Keggi (Latvian: Māra Kegi, born October 7, 1962) is an American rower of Latvian descent. She competed in the women's coxless pair event at the 1988 Summer Olympics.

She is the daughter of Latvian orthopedic surgeon Kristaps Keggi.
