= Lee Sang-ho (wrestler) =

South Korean wrestler (born 1963)

Medal record

Representing South Korea

Men's freestyle wrestling

World Championships
| Silver medal – second place | 1987 Clermont-Ferrand | 48 kg |

Lee Sang-Ho (Korean: 이상호; Hanja: 李相昊; born May 22, 1963) is a retired South Korean freestyle wrestler.

In 1987, Lee won the silver medal in the freestyle 48 kg class at the World Wrestling Championships held in Clermont-Ferrand, France.

Lee was considered the favorite for the 1988 Olympic gold medal as two-time world champion Li Jae-Sik did not participated in the Olympics due to North Korea's boycott. However, Lee withdrew the tournament after he dislocated his elbow in the first match against eventual gold medalist Takashi Kobayashi.
