= Tsvetomira Filipova =

Bulgarian rhythmic gymnast and coach

- Цветомира Иванова Филипова
- Alternative name: Cvetomira Filipova
- Born: 5 January 1969 (age 57) Cherven Bryag, Bulgaria
- Spouse: Banko Panov

Gymnastics career
- Discipline: Rhythmic gymnastics
- Country represented: Bulgaria; (1982-1986)
- Head coach: Neshka Robeva
- Assistant coach: Rayna Afionlieva
- Retired: yes
Medal record
Representing Bulgaria
World Championships
Gold medal – first place	1983 Strasbourg	Group All-Around
Goodwill Games
Bronze medal – third place	1986 Moscow	Ball
Bronze medal – third place	1986 Moscow	Clubs

Tsvetomira Filipova (born 5 January 1969) is a former Bulgarian rhythmic gymnast who competed as both an individual and in groups; she is the 1983 World champion as a group member. She now works as a coach and was the coach of the Canadian senior national group for seven years.

== Biography ==
Filipova was born in Chirpan and grew up and studied in Kyustendil, where she began training at the local school of rhythmic gymnastics. She joined the national team under Neshka Robeva and moved to Sofia without her parents.

In 1983 she took part in the World Championships in Strasbourg, winning gold as part of the group. She later called the competition the "brightest moment" in her career. The following year, she was among the gymnasts that took part in the control competition to choose the Bulgarian representative for the 1984 Olympic Games, the first to feature rhythmic gymnastics, though in the end, the Soviet bloc boycotted the games.

In 1985, Tsvetomira won all-around gold at the Intervision Cup in Havana. She competed at the inaugural Goodwill Games in Moscow in 1986, where she took 4th place in the all-around. She won two medals in the event finals, bronze with both ball and clubs, and finished fifth in both the rope and ribbon finals.

After her retirement, she moved to Canada to work with the Cirque du Soleil. Although she did not initially intend to stay in Canada, she is now based in Toronto and works as a coach. She was the coach of the Canadian senior group from 2014 until 2021. Her husband, Banko Panov, a graduate from the school of the Bolshoi Theater, was the choreographer, and their daughter Vanessa was a member of the ensemble.
