= Georgi Polyakov =

Bulgarian sports shooter

Personal information
- Nationality: Bulgarian
- Born: 23 January 1956 (age 69); Sofia, Bulgaria

Sport
- Sport: Sports shooting

Georgi Polyakov (Bulgarian: Георги Поляков; born 23 January 1956) is a Bulgarian sports shooter. He competed in three events at the 1988 Summer Olympics.
