= Mariya Kartalova =

Bulgarian artistic gymnast (born 1969)

Mariya Kartalova (Bulgarian: Мария Карталова) (born 26 June 1969) is a Bulgarian former artistic gymnast. She competed at the 1988 Summer Olympics.
