= Hour Jiunn-yih =

Taiwanese wrestler

Personal information
- Full name: 侯 駿逸, Pinyin: Hóu Jùn-yì
- Nationality: Taiwanese
- Born: 11 March 1967
- Died: 29 September 2022 (aged 55)

Sport
- Sport: Wrestling

Hour Jiunn-yih (11 March 1967 - 29 September 2022) is a Taiwanese wrestler. He competed in the men's freestyle 48 kg at the 1988 Summer Olympics. Hou also competed in the 1990 Asian Games, placing sixth in the 48 kg Greco-Roman class.

He died in 2022 due to a car accident.
