= Milcho Milanov =

Bulgarian volleyball player (born 1965)

Personal information
- Nationality: Bulgarian
- Born: 4 March 1965 (age 60); Sofia, Bulgaria

Sport
- Sport: Volleyball

Milcho Milanov (Bulgarian: Милчо Миланов, born 4 March 1965) is a Bulgarian volleyball player. He competed in the men's tournament at the 1988 Summer Olympics.
