= Khrabrina Khrabrova =

Bulgarian gymnast (born 1973)

Personal information
- Nationality: Bulgarian
- Born: 2 June 1973 (age 51); Varna, Bulgaria

Sport
- Sport: Gymnastics

Khrabrina Khrabrova (Bulgarian: Храбрина Храброва) (born 2 June 1973) is a Bulgarian gymnast. She competed in six events at the 1988 Summer Olympics.
