= Suryadi Gunawan =

Indonesian wrestler

Personal information
- Nationality: Indonesian
- Born: 25 May 1966 (age 60)

Sport
- Sport: Wrestling

Suryadi Gunawan (born 25 May 1966) is an Indonesian wrestler. He competed in the men's freestyle 48 kg at the 1988 Summer Olympics.
