= Amos Ojo =

Nigerian wrestler (1962–2025)

Personal information
- Full name: Amos Adekunle Ojo
- Nationality: Nigerian
- Born: 20 July 1962
- Died: 17 February 2025 (aged 62)
- Height: 1.40 m (4 ft 7 in)
- Weight: 48 kg (106 lb)

Sport
- Sport: Wrestling

Amos Adekunle Ojo (20 July 1962 – 17 February 2025) was a Nigerian wrestler. He competed in the 1988 and 1992 Summer Olympics.

Ojo died on 17 February 2025, at the age of 62.
