= Petko Dragiev =

Bulgarian volleyball player (born 1965)

Personal information
- Nationality: Bulgarian
- Born: 14 April 1965 (age 59); Plovdiv, Bulgaria

Sport
- Sport: Volleyball

Petko Dragiev (Bulgarian: Петко Драгиев, born 14 April 1965) is a Bulgarian volleyball player. He competed in the men's tournament at the 1988 Summer Olympics.
