= Mohammad Razigul =

Afghan wrestler (born 1942)

Mohammad Razigul (born 1942) is a former wrestler from Afghanistan. He competed at the 1988 Summer Olympics in the light-flyingweight event.
