= Takashi Kobayashi (wrestler) =

Japanese freestyle wrestler

Medal record

Representing Japan

Men's freestyle wrestling

Olympic Games
Gold medal – first place	1988 Seoul	48 kg

World Championships
Bronze medal – third place	1990 Tokyo	48 kg

Takashi Kobayashi (小林 孝至, Kobayashi Takashi) (born 17 May 1963) is a Japanese wrestler and Olympic champion in Freestyle wrestling.

== Olympics ==
Kobayashi competed at the 1988 Summer Olympics in Seoul where he received a gold medal in Freestyle wrestling, the light flyweight class.
