= Ivelina Raykova =

Bulgarian gymnast (born 1971)

Personal information
- Nationality: Bulgarian
- Born: 12 November 1971 (age 54) Razgrad, Bulgaria

Sport
- Sport: Gymnastics
Medal record
Representing Bulgaria
Goodwill Games
Silver medal – second place	1986 Moscow	Team

Ivelina Raykova (Bulgarian: Ивелина Райкова) (born 12 November 1971) is a Bulgarian gymnast. She competed in six events at the 1988 Summer Olympics.
