= Delyana Vodenicharova =

Bulgarian gymnast (born 1973)

- Деляна Воденичарова
- Alternative name: Deliana Vodenitcharova
- Born: 19 October 1973 (age 52) Ruse, Bulgaria

Gymnastics career
- Discipline: Women's artistic gymnastics
- Country represented: Bulgaria

Delyana Vodenicharova (Bulgarian: Деляна Воденичарова; born 19 October 1973) is a Bulgarian former artistic gymnast who now works as a coach. She competed at the 1988 Summer Olympics and the 1992 Summer Olympics, as well as the 1989 World Championships and 1993 World Championships.

== Early life and education ==
Vodenicharova was born on 24 October, 1973 in Ruse, Bulgaria and trained in Gabrovo; she became an honorary citizen of the city in 1988 due to her performance at the 1988 Summer Olympics. She graduated from the National Sports Academy "Vasil Levski".

She began gymnastics in kindergarten after a selection event by the coaches. Vodenicharova recalled that she was not selected for her physical abilities but because her mother knew the teacher.

== Career ==
Vodenicharova trained with Iliya Nedev and Viliana Kambourova; she also worked with the acrobatic gymnastics and trampolining coach Lilyan Alexandrov ahead of the 1992 Summer Olympics. After five years of training, she became a member of the national team.

In 1988, she competed at the European Juniors Championships, where she placed 13th in the all-around and qualified to the vault and floor finals; she placed 8th in both. At the 1988 Seoul Olympics, she placed 12th in the all-around final and qualified to the floor exercise final, where she finished in 4th place.

In 1989, Vodenicharova was injured. After her disappointing experience at the 1989 World Championships, where she placed 20th in the all-around, she quit gymnastics for eight months. She then competed at a meet for professional gymnasts, and after competing in several other events, went on to rejoin the national team.

She competed at the 1992 European Championships and tied for 22nd in the all-around with Cristina Fraguas. She was again selected to compete at the 1992 Barcelona Olympics and finished in 31st place in the all-around final. Her last major competition was the 1993 World Championships, where she placed 69th in the qualifying round.

After retiring from competition, she moved to the United States to work as a coach.

== Competitive history ==
Year	Event	Team	AA	VT	UB	BB	FX
1987	Junior Friendship Tournament	3rd place, bronze medalist(s)		8		7	
1988	Belgian Gym Masters		7				3rd place, bronze medalist(s)
1988	Chunichi Cup		13				4
1988	International Championships of Romania		4				
1988	Junior European Championships		13				
1988	Tokyo Cup						5
1988	Olympic Games	5	12				4
1989	McDonald's American Cup		8				
1989	International Mixed Pairs	13					
1989	World Championships	8	20				
1992
1992	European Championships		22				
1992	Olympic Games	12	31				
1993	Cottbus International		16				
