= Diana Dudeva =

Bulgarian gymnast (born 1968)

- Full name: Diana Genkova Dudeva
- Born: July 7, 1968 (age 58) Pleven, Bulgaria
- Height: 1.57 m (5 ft 2 in)

Gymnastics career
- Discipline: Women's artistic gymnastics
- Country represented: Bulgaria
- Club: ZSKA Sofia
- Head coach: Ivan Kondev
Medal record
Representing Bulgaria
Olympic Games
Bronze medal – third place	1988 Seoul	Floor Exercise
European Championships
Silver medal – second place	1987 Moscow	Uneven Bars
Bronze medal – third place	1987 Moscow	All-Around
Goodwill Games
Silver medal – second place	1986 Moscow	Team
Bronze medal – third place	1986 Moscow	Balance Beam

Diana Genkova Dudeva (Bulgarian: Диана Гeнкова Дудева; born July 7, 1968) is a Bulgarian former artistic gymnast. She competed at the 1988 Summer Olympics and won the bronze medal on floor exercise. As of 2023, Dudeva is the only female Bulgarian artistic gymnast to win a medal at the Olympics.

== Career ==
Dudeva was a member of the Bulgarian team that finished fourth at the 1983 World Championships. Her individual result in the team event was 29th, but she did not advance to the all-around final (top 36) as there were three other Bulgarian gymnasts ahead of her.

In 1985, Dudeva finished seventh in the all-around at the European Championships, where she also reached three of the four event finals; vault (6th), bars (6th) and beam (8th). She went on to finish 24th in the all-around at the 1985 World Championships, where the Bulgarian's once again finished fourth in the team event. At the 1986 Goodwill Games, she won a silver medal in the team event, a bronze medal on beam, and finished 10th in the all-around.

In 1987, Dudeva won two medals at the European Championships; silver on the uneven bars, and a bronze in the all-around (tied with Elena Shushunova). At the 1987 World Championships, she was ninth in the all-around, sixth in the beam final, and fifth in the team event. She concluded her international career by winning an Olympic bronze medal in the floor exercise at the 1988 Olympic Games in Seoul, where she also finished fifth in the team event, sixth in the balance beam final, and ninth in the all-around.

== See also ==
- List of Olympic female artistic gymnasts for Bulgaria
