= 1987 World Artistic Gymnastics Championships =

Gymnastics competition

- Venue: Rotterdam Ahoy
- Location: Rotterdam, Netherlands

The 24th Artistic Gymnastics World Championships were held in Rotterdam, Netherlands, in 1987.

== Results ==
Event	Gold	Silver	Bronze
Men
Team all-around	Soviet Union; Dmitry Bilozerchev; Valeri Liukin; Vladimir Artemov; Yuri Korolyov; Vladimir Novikov; Aleksei Tikhonkikh	China; Xu Zhiqiang; Lou Yun; Wang Chongsheng; Guo Linxian; Li Chunyang; Li Ning	East Germany; Sylvio Kroll; Sven Tippelt; Holger Behrendt; Ulf Hoffmann; Maik Belle; Mario Reichert
Individual all-around	(Soviet Union) Dmitry Bilozerchev	(Soviet Union) Yuri Korolyov	(Soviet Union) Vladimir Artemov
Floor	(China) Lou Yun	(Soviet Union) Vladimir Artemov	(Bulgaria) Lubomir Geraskov
Pommel horse	(Hungary) Zsolt Borkai (Soviet Union) Dmitry Bilozerchev	none awarded	(Bulgaria) Lubomir Geraskov
Rings	(Soviet Union) Yuri Korolyov	(China) Li Ning (Soviet Union) Dmitry Bilozerchev	none awarded
Vault	(China) Lou Yun (East Germany) Sylvio Kroll	none awarded	(Bulgaria) Deyan Kolev
Parallel bars	(Soviet Union) Vladimir Artemov	(Soviet Union) Dmitry Bilozerchev	(East Germany) Sven Tippelt
Horizontal bar	(Soviet Union) Dmitry Bilozerchev	(Canada) Curtis Hibbert	(East Germany) Holger Behrendt (Hungary) Zsolt Borkai
Women
Team all-around	(Romania) Romania; Aurelia Dobre; Daniela Silivaș; Ecaterina Szabo; Camelia Voinea; Eugenia Golea; Celestina Popa	Soviet Union; Yelena Shushunova; Svetlana Baitova; Oksana Omelianchik; Elena Gurova; Svetlana Boginskaya; Tatiana Tuzhikova	East Germany; Dörte Thümmler; Ulrike Klotz; Martina Jentsch; Klaudia Rapp; Astrid Heese; Gabriele Fähnrich
Individual all-around	(Romania) Aurelia Dobre	(Soviet Union) Yelena Shushunova	(Romania) Daniela Silivaș
Vault	(Soviet Union) Yelena Shushunova	(Romania) Eugenia Golea	(Romania) Aurelia Dobre
Uneven bars	(East Germany) Dörte Thümmler (Romania) Daniela Silivaș	none awarded	(Soviet Union) Yelena Shushunova
Balance beam	(Romania) Aurelia Dobre	(Soviet Union) Yelena Shushunova	(Romania) Ecaterina Szabo (Soviet Union) Svetlana Boginskaya
Floor	(Romania) Daniela Silivaș (Soviet Union) Yelena Shushunova	none awarded	(Romania) Aurelia Dobre

== Men ==
=== Team final ===
Rank	Team	Floor		Pommel Horse		Rings		Vault		Parallel Bars		Horizontal Bar		Total
Rank	Team	C	O	C	O	C	O	C	O	C	O	C	O	Total
Gold medal	Soviet Union	97.950		97.600		98.950		98.900		98.250		98.100		589.750
Gold medal	Dmitry Bilozerchev	9.800	9.850	9.750	9.950	9.900	9.900	9.950	9.900	9.700	9.950	9.900	9.900	118.450
Gold medal	Valeri Liukin	9.900	9.850	9.650	9.900	9.900	9.800	9.850	9.800	9.800	9.950	9.850	9.800	118.050
Gold medal	Vladimir Artemov	9.850	9.700	9.650	9.800	9.900	9.900	9.900	9.900	9.800	9.950	9.800	9.800	117.950
Gold medal	Yuri Korolyov	9.900	9.550	9.700	9.900	9.950	9.900	9.900	9.900	9.750	9.900	9.700	9.850	117.900
Gold medal	Vladimir Novikov	9.800	9.500	9.550	9.600	9.900	9.900	9.800	9.950	9.550	9.900	9.700	9.800	116.950
Gold medal	Alexei Tikhonkikh	9.700	9.750	9.050	9.750	9.800	9.750	9.800	9.850	9.550	9.800	9.600	9.750	116.150
Silver medal	China	97.700		96.450		97.350		98.100		96.700		97.050		583.350
Silver medal	Xu Zhiqiang	9.700	9.950	9.550	9.850	9.700	9.800	9.850	9.900	9.700	10.000	9.800	9.800	117.600
Silver medal	Lou Yun	9.760	10.000	9.400	9.300	9.750	9.800	9.950	9.950	9.400	9.750	9.700	9.800	116.550
Silver medal	Wang Chongsheng	9.700	9.600	9.600	9.800	9.550	9.650	9.850	9.800	9.300	9.750	9.650	9.700	115.950
Silver medal	Guo Linxian	9.600	9.750	9.300	9.550	9.500	9.650	9.750	9.700	9.550	9.850	9.500	9.600	115.300
Silver medal	Li Chunyang	9.600	9.800	9.400	9.700	9.650	9.600	9.800	9.250	9.450	9.800	9.500	9.700	115.250
Silver medal	Li Ning	9.850	0.000	9.700	9.900	9.850	9.950	9.750	9.550	9.050	9.900	9.800	0.000	97.300
3rd place, bronze medalist(s)	East Germany	97.150		96.000		97.650		98.150		97.200		96.650		582.800
3rd place, bronze medalist(s)	Sylvio Kroll	9.750	9.800	9.700	9.850	9.800	9.850	9.900	10.000	9.700	9.900	9.700	9.150	117.100
3rd place, bronze medalist(s)	Sven Tippelt	9.700	9.700	9.600	9.550	9.850	9.900	9.750	9.800	9.750	9.900	9.600	9.700	116.800
3rd place, bronze medalist(s)	Holger Behrendt	9.800	9.700	9.500	9.500	9.800	9.300	9.800	9.900	9.400	9.850	9.800	9.850	116.200
3rd place, bronze medalist(s)	Ulf Hoffmann	9.600	9.800	9.350	9.500	9.700	9.800	9.800	9.800	9.550	9.850	9.500	9.650	115.900
3rd place, bronze medalist(s)	Maik Belle	9.700	9.600	9.600	9.800	9.500	9.700	9.050	9.800	9.200	9.850	9.500	9.750	115.050
3rd place, bronze medalist(s)	Mario Reichert	9.400	9.600	9.350	9.550	9.600	9.650	9.600	9.800	9.450	9.800	9.400	9.600	114.800
4	Bulgaria	97.200		95.750		97.650		98.000		95.450		95.500		579.050
4	Kalofer Khristozov	9.800	9.900	9.450	9.750	9.800	9.800	9.800	9.900	9.550	9.900	9.350	9.700	116.650
4	Lubomir Geraskov	9.750	9.850	9.700	9.900	9.650	9.750	9.600	9.700	9.050	9.700	9.650	9.400	115.700
4	Dian Kolev	9.600	9.800	9.300	9.300	9.850	9.700	9.900	9.950	9.050	9.550	9.500	9.550	115.050
4	Stoytcho Gotchev	9.600	9.500	9.250	9.400	9.750	9.700	9.500	9.700	9.550	9.700	9.650	9.750	115.050
4	Marian Penev	9.750	9.650	9.350	9.600	9.850	9.800	9.800	9.800	9.350	9.800	9.700	9.250	114.650
4	Petar Gueorgiev	9.600	9.100	9.600	9.700	9.600	9.550	9.750	9.800	9.300	9.450	9.300	8.650	113.400

=== All-around ===
Rank	Gymnast	Floor (gymnastics)	Pommel horse	Rings (gymnastics)	Vault (gymnastics)	Parallel bars	Horizontal bar	Score	Prelim score	Total
1st place, gold medalist(s)	Dmitry Bilozerchev (URS)	9.800	9.950	9.850	9.900	9.750	9.900	59.150	59.225	118.375
2nd place, silver medalist(s)	Yuri Korolyov (URS)	9.900	9.850	9.900	10.000	9.900	9.850	59.400	58.950	118.350
3rd place, bronze medalist(s)	Vladimir Artemov (URS)	9.900	9.900	9.750	9.900	9.900	9.900	59.150	58.975	118.125
4	Sylvio Kroll (GDR)	9.650	9.950	9.850	10.000	9.600	9.800	58.850	58.550	117.400
5	Zsolt Borkai (HUN)	9.600	9.900	9.600	9.850	9.850	9.900	58.700	58.550	117.250
6	Holger Behrendt (GDR)	9.900	9.650	9.850	9.900	9.850	9.500	59.100	58.100	117.200
7	Lou Yun (CHN)	9.800	9.750	9.850	9.900	9.800	9.800	58.900	58.275	117.125
8	Sven Tippelt (GDR)	9.700	9.900	9.800	9.850	9.750	9.550	58.550	58.400	116.950
9	Kalofer Khristozov (BUL)	9.450	9.800	9.750	9.900	9.850	9.700	58.450	58.325	116.775
10	Koichi Mizushima (JPN)	9.750	9.800	9.750	9.900	9.850	9.500	58.550	58.175	116.725
11	György Guczoghy (HUN)	9.700	9.700	9.750	9.750	9.900	9.400	58.200	58.325	116.525
12	Xu Zhiqiang (CHN)	9.850	9.500	9.800	9.550	9.000	9.800	57.500	58.800	116.300
13	Wang Chongsheng (CHN)	9.700	9.850	9.650	9.850	9.800	9.250	58.100	57.975	116.075
14	Boris Preti (ITA)	9.600	9.750	9.750	9.800	9.500	9.850	58.250	57.750	116.000
15	Sepp Zellweger (SUI)	9.600	9.800	9.800	9.650	9.750	9.700	58.300	57.650	115.950
16	Casimiro Suárez (CUB)	9.750	9.300	9.600	9.750	9.800	9.900	58.100	57.825	115.925
17	Csaba Fajkusz (HUN)	9.600	9.850	9.650	9.800	9.700	9.850	58.450	57.450	115.900
17	Johan Jonasson (SWE)	9.650	9.750	9.750	9.850	9.650	9.800	58.450	57.450	115.900
19	Marius Gherman (ROU)	9.600	9.700	9.600	9.750	9.750	9.900	58.300	57.525	115.825
20	Jury Chechi (ITA)	9.550	9.750	9.850	9.900	9.600	9.600	58.250	57.550	115.800
21	Naoyuki Terao (JPN)	9.750	9.550	9.600	9.850	9.750	9.600	58.100	57.575	115.675
22	Dan Hayden (USA)	9.350	9.750	9.700	9.650	9.800	9.850	58.100	57.450	115.550
23	Lubomir Geraskov (BUL)	9.500	9.900	9.550	9.550	9.550	9.550	57.600	57.850	115.450
24	Marius Tobă (ROU)	9.700	9.600	9.750	9.800	9.800	9.600	58.250	57.175	115.425
25	Luis Cartaya (CUB)	9.700	9.550	9.700	9.850	9.600	9.750	58.150	57.200	115.350
26	Dian Kolev (BUL)	9.700	9.600	9.600	9.900	9.750	9.200	57.750	57.525	115.275
27	Andreas Aguilar (FRG)	9.200	9.350	9.800	9.700	9.800	9.650	57.500	57.700	115.200
28	Park Jong-hoon (KOR)	9.800	9.500	9.500	9.900	9.600	9.700	58.000	57.150	115.150
29	Laurent Barbiéri (FRA)	9.600	9.600	9.550	9.700	9.600	9.800	57.850	57.250	115.100
30	Curtis Hibbert (CAN)	9.700	8.900	9.650	9.850	9.600	9.800	57.500	57.575	115.075
31	Valentin Pîntea (ROU)	9.650	9.400	9.650	9.800	9.600	9.600	57.700	57.250	114.950
32	Hiroyuki Konishi (JPN)	9.300	9.500	9.650	9.550	9.500	9.700	57.200	57.575	114.775
33	Dusan Hilbert (TCH)	9.200	9.600	9.600	9.700	9.800	9.650	57.550	57.150	114.700
34	Ralf Kern (FRG)	9.500	9.100	9.450	9.700	9.700	9.800	57.250	57.300	114.550
35	Alfonso Rodríguez (ESP)	9.750	8.800	9.650	9.750	9.700	9.500	57.150	57.150	114.300
36	Felix Aguilera (CUB)	9.350	9.800	9.550	9.500	9.400	8.400	56.000	57.375	113.375

=== Floor exercise ===
Rank	Gymnast	Score	Prelim score	Total
1st place, gold medalist(s)	Lou Yun (CHN)	10.000	9.875	19.875
2nd place, silver medalist(s)	Vladimir Artemov (URS)	9.900	9.775	19.675
3rd place, bronze medalist(s)	Lubomir Geraskov (BUL)	9.850	9.800	19.650
4	Xu Zhiqiang (CHN)	9.800	9.825	19.625
5	Kalofer Khristozov (BUL)	9.750	9.850	19.600
6	Sylvio Kroll (GDR)	9.800	9.775	19.575
7	Koichi Mizushima (JPN)	9.550	9.850	19.400
8	György Guczoghy (HUN)	9.475	9.775	19.250

=== Pommel horse ===
Rank	Gymnast	Score	Prelim score	Total
1st place, gold medalist(s)	Dmitry Bilozerchev (URS)	9.925	9.850	19.775
1st place, gold medalist(s)	Zsolt Borkai (HUN)	9.975	9.800	19.775
3rd place, bronze medalist(s)	Lubomir Geraskov (BUL)	9.925	9.800	19.725
4	Yuri Korolyov (URS)	9.875	9.800	19.675
5	Sylvio Kroll (GDR)	9.875	9.775	19.650
6	Xu Zhiqiang (CHN)	9.900	9.700	19.600
7	Li Ning (CHN)	9.250	9.800	19.050
8	Maik Belle (GDR)	8.600	9.700	18.300

=== Rings ===
Rank	Gymnast	Score	Prelim score	Total
1st place, gold medalist(s)	Yuri Korolyov (URS)	9.950	9.925	19.875
2nd place, silver medalist(s)	Dmitry Bilozerchev (URS)	9.925	9.900	19.825
2nd place, silver medalist(s)	Li Ning (CHN)	9.925	9.900	19.825
4	Sven Tippelt (GDR)	9.875	9.875	19.750
5	Andreas Aguilar (FRG)	9.875	9.850	19.725
6	Jury Chechi (ITA)	9.875	9.800	19.675
7	Kalofer Khristozov (BUL)	9.850	9.800	19.650
8	Marian Penev (BUL)	9.725	9.825	19.550

=== Vault ===
Rank	Gymnast	Score	Prelim score	Total
1st place, gold medalist(s)	Sylvio Kroll (GDR)	9.988	9.950	19.938
1st place, gold medalist(s)	Lou Yun (CHN)	9.988	9.950	19.938
3rd place, bronze medalist(s)	Dian Kolev (BUL)	9.913	9.925	19.838
4	Dmitry Bilozerchev (URS)	9.875	9.925	19.800
4	Yuri Korolyov (URS)	9.900	9.900	19.800
6	Zsolt Borkai (HUN)	9.763	9.850	19.613
7	Xu Zhiqiang (CHN)	9.725	9.875	19.600
8	György Guczoghy (HUN)	9.675	9.900	19.575

=== Parallel bars ===
Rank	Gymnast	Score	Prelim score	Total
1st place, gold medalist(s)	Vladimir Artemov (URS)	9.925	9.875	19.800
2nd place, silver medalist(s)	Dmitry Bilozerchev (URS)	9.950	9.825	19.775
3rd place, bronze medalist(s)	Sven Tippelt (GDR)	9.900	9.825	19.725
4	Sylvio Kroll (GDR)	9.900	9.800	19.700
5	Koichi Mizushima (JPN)	9.850	9.800	19.650
6	Marian Rizan (ROU)	9.825	9.750	19.575
7	Andreas Aguilar (FRG)	9.775	9.750	19.525
8	Xu Zhiqiang (CHN)	9.625	9.850	19.475

=== Horizontal bar ===
Rank	Gymnast	Score	Prelim score	Total
1st place, gold medalist(s)	Dmitry Bilozerchev (URS)	9.925	9.900	19.825
2nd place, silver medalist(s)	Curtis Hibbert (CAN)	9.900	9.850	19.750
3rd place, bronze medalist(s)	Holger Behrendt (GDR)	9.900	9.825	19.725
3rd place, bronze medalist(s)	Zsolt Borkai (HUN)	9.875	9.850	19.725
5	Vladimir Artemov (URS)	9.900	9.800	19.700
5	Casimiro Suárez (CUB)	9.925	9.775	19.700
7	Xu Zhiqiang (CHN)	9.825	9.800	19.625
8	Lou Yun (CHN)	9.200	9.760	18.950

== Women ==
=== Team final ===
Rank	Team	Vault (gymnastics)		Uneven bars		Balance beam		Floor (gymnastics)		Total
Rank	Team	C	O	C	O	C	O	C	O	Total
1st place, gold medalist(s)	Romania	99.200		98.750		98.275		99.175		395.400
1st place, gold medalist(s)	Aurelia Dobre	9.900	10.000	9.900	9.925	9.900	10.000	9.925	10.000	79.550
1st place, gold medalist(s)	Daniela Silivaș	9.975	9.925	9.975	10.000	10.000	9.575	10.000	10.000	79.450
1st place, gold medalist(s)	Ecaterina Szabo	9.850	9.900	9.800	9.900	9.875	9.850	9.875	9.900	78.950
1st place, gold medalist(s)	Camelia Voinea	9.850	9.900	9.875	9.800	9.575	9.875	9.875	10.000	78.750
1st place, gold medalist(s)	Eugenia Golea	9.900	10.000	9.700	9.775	9.600	9.800	9.800	9.800	78.375
1st place, gold medalist(s)	Celestina Popa	9.800	9.825	9.675	9.875	9.800	9.375	9.775	9.800	77.925
2nd place, silver medalist(s)	Soviet Union	99.050		98.850		97.975		99.075		394.950
2nd place, silver medalist(s)	Yelena Shushunova	10.000	9.975	9.925	9.975	9.725	9.875	10.000	10.000	79.475
2nd place, silver medalist(s)	Svetlana Baitova	9.950	9.875	9.900	9.925	9.775	9.800	9.900	9.900	79.025
2nd place, silver medalist(s)	Oksana Omelianchik	9.900	9.950	9.900	9.900	9.875	9.700	9.975	9.550	78.750
2nd place, silver medalist(s)	Elena Gurova	9.875	9.825	9.825	9.825	9.500	9.825	9.900	9.900	78.475
2nd place, silver medalist(s)	Svetlana Boginskaya	9.850	9.850	9.850	9.425	9.800	9.875	9.850	9.850	78.350
2nd place, silver medalist(s)	Tatiana Tuzhikova	9.825	9.800	9.800	9.825	9.725	9.325	9.800	9.800	77.900
3rd place, bronze medalist(s)	East Germany	97.000		98.350		96.850		97.400		389.600
3rd place, bronze medalist(s)	Dörte Thümmler	9.525	9.850	9.975	10.000	9.600	9.650	9.900	9.800	78.300
3rd place, bronze medalist(s)	Ulrike Klotz	9.675	9.775	9.725	9.825	9.850	9.750	9.900	9.650	78.150
3rd place, bronze medalist(s)	Martina Jentsch	9.700	9.875	9.775	9.925	9.500	9.675	9.850	9.775	78.075
3rd place, bronze medalist(s)	Klaudia Rapp	9.575	9.725	9.600	9.250	9.750	9.675	9.825	9.450	76.850
3rd place, bronze medalist(s)	Astrid Heese	9.550	9.750	9.725	9.800	9.475	9.600	9.625	9.300	76.850
3rd place, bronze medalist(s)	Gabriele Fähnrich	9.000	9.650	9.475	10.000	9.800	9.425	9.700	9.550	76.600
4	China	97.650		97.375		94.550		97.275		386.850
4	Chen Cuiting	9.725	9.625	9.575	9.900	9.375	9.575	9.900	9.750	77.425
4	Fan Di	9.650	9.750	9.650	10.000	9.375	9.625	9.775	9.575	77.400
4	Wang Xiaoyan	9.825	9.750	9.700	9.900	9.400	9.450	9.700	9.650	77.375
4	Luo Feng	9.800	9.725	9.450	9.900	9.675	9.150	9.775	9.625	76.850
4	Ma Ying	9.575	9.850	9.425	9.700	9.450	9.475	9.600	9.650	76.725
4	Wang Huiying	9.800	9.775	9.500	9.800	9.150	9.075	9.825	9.625	76.550

=== All-around ===
Rank	Gymnast	Vault (gymnastics)	Uneven bars	Balance beam	Floor (gymnastics)	Score	Prelim score	Total
1st place, gold medalist(s)	Aurelia Dobre (ROU)	10.000	9.975	9.925	9.975	39.875	39.775	79.650
2nd place, silver medalist(s)	Yelena Shushunova (URS)	9.950	9.875	9.925	10.000	39.750	39.737	79.487
3rd place, bronze medalist(s)	Daniela Silivaș (ROU)	9.975	9.625	9.900	9.975	39.475	39.725	79.200
4	Svetlana Baitova (URS)	9.875	9.900	9.800	9.975	39.550	39.512	79.062
5	Oksana Omelianchik (URS)	9.850	9.875	9.650	9.950	39.325	39.375	78.700
6	Dörte Thümmler (GDR)	9.850	9.875	9.600	9.875	39.200	39.150	78.350
7	Martina Jentsch (GDR)	9.800	9.825	9.750	9.875	39.250	39.037	78.287
8	Ulrike Klotz (GDR)	9.800	9.700	9.800	9.875	39.175	39.075	78.250
9	Diana Dudeva (BUL)	9.825	9.800	9.875	9.875	39.375	38.712	78.087
10	Boriana Stoyanova (BUL)	9.800	9.800	9.725	9.850	39.175	38.900	78.075
11	Chen Cuiting (CHN)	9.850	9.700	9.625	9.750	38.925	38.712	77.637
12	Mariya Kartalova (BUL)	9.825	9.725	9.700	9.775	39.025	38.587	77.612
13	Andrea Ladányi (HUN)	9.725	9.725	9.650	9.800	38.900	38.550	77.450
14	Ecaterina Szabo (ROU)	9.925	9.250	8.850	9.875	37.900	39.475	77.375
15	Lori Strong (CAN)	9.875	9.825	9.750	9.600	39.050	38.287	77.337
16	Laura Muñoz (ESP)	9.775	9.675	9.675	9.700	38.825	38.450	77.275
17	Wang Xiaoyan (CHN)	9.825	9.725	9.550	9.450	38.550	38.687	77.237
18	Park Ji-suk (KOR)	9.900	9.650	9.525	9.675	38.750	38.237	76.987
19	Rhonda Faehn (USA)	9.850	9.650	9.700	9.575	38.775	38.187	76.962
20	Fan Di (CHN)	9.700	9.900	9.150	9.475	38.225	38.700	76.925
21	Sabrina Mar (USA)	9.850	9.075	9.575	9.775	38.275	38.587	76.862
21	Iveta Poloková (TCH)	9.625	9.675	9.625	9.825	38.750	38.112	76.862
23	Melissa Marlowe (USA)	9.700	9.750	9.775	9.250	38.475	38.350	76.825
24	Beáta Storczer (HUN)	9.650	9.650	9.700	9.725	38.725	38.037	76.762
25	Monica Covacci (CAN)	9.775	9.650	9.675	9.525	38.625	38.025	76.650
26	Karine Boucher (FRA)	9.825	9.650	9.700	9.425	38.600	38.025	76.625
27	Giulia Volpi (ITA)	9.650	9.650	9.600	9.675	38.575	38.031	76.606
28	Janine Rankin (CAN)	9.750	9.650	9.600	9.550	38.550	37.887	76.437
29	Patrizia Luconi (ITA)	9.750	9.750	9.625	9.325	38.450	37.862	76.312
30	Anja Wilhelm (FRG)	9.700	9.450	9.575	9.775	38.500	37.787	76.287
31	Eszter Óváry (HUN)	9.800	9.625	8.850	9.700	37.975	38.175	76.150
32	Kyoko Seo (JPN)	9.600	9.075	9.500	9.550	37.725	37.662	75.387
33	Kim Eun-mi (KOR)	9.700	9.625	8.550	9.575	37.450	37.912	75.362
34	Jana Částečková (TCH)	9.675	9.475	9.025	8.950	37.125	37.775	74.900
35	Miho Shinoda (JPN)	8.800	9.150	9.000	9.550	36.500	38.344	74.844
36	Fofo Varvariotou (GRE)	9.575	9.550	8.900	8.675	36.700	37.725	74.425

=== Vault ===
Rank	Gymnast	Score	Prelim score	Total
1st place, gold medalist(s)	Yelena Shushunova (URS)	9.907	9.987	19.894
2nd place, silver medalist(s)	Eugenia Golea (ROU)	9.907	9.950	19.857
3rd place, bronze medalist(s)	Aurelia Dobre (ROU)	9.894	9.950	19.844
4	Svetlana Baitova (URS)	9.738	9.912	19.650
5	Boriana Stoyanova (BUL)	9.832	9.787	19.619
6	Wang Xiaoyan (CHN)	9.794	9.787	19.581
7	Wang Huiying (CHN)	9.782	9.787	19.569
8	Martina Jentsch (GDR)	9.700	9.787	19.487

=== Uneven bars ===
Rank	Gymnast	Score	Prelim score	Total
1st place, gold medalist(s)	Daniela Silivaș (ROU)	9.938	9.987	19.925
1st place, gold medalist(s)	Dörte Thümmler (GDR)	9.938	9.987	19.925
3rd place, bronze medalist(s)	Yelena Shushunova (URS)	9.963	9.950	19.913
4	Aurelia Dobre (ROU)	9.950	9.912	19.862
4	Svetlana Baitova (URS)	9.950	9.912	19.862
6	Fan Di (CHN)	9.950	9.825	19.775
7	Martina Jentsch (GDR)	9.913	9.850	19.763
8	Wang Xiaoyan (CHN)	9.800	9.800	19.600

=== Balance beam ===
Rank	Gymnast	Score	Prelim score	Total
1st place, gold medalist(s)	Aurelia Dobre (ROU)	10.000	9.950	19.950
2nd place, silver medalist(s)	Yelena Shushunova (URS)	9.975	9.800	19.775
3rd place, bronze medalist(s)	Svetlana Boginskaya (URS)	9.900	9.837	19.737
3rd place, bronze medalist(s)	Ecaterina Szabo (ROU)	9.875	9.862	19.737
5	Ulrike Klotz (GDR)	9.763	9.800	19.563
6	Diana Dudeva (BUL)	9.900	9.650	19.550
7	Klaudia Rapp (GDR)	9.100	9.712	18.812
8	Iveta Poloková (TCH)	8.988	9.637	18.625

=== Floor exercise ===
Rank	Gymnast	Score	Prelim score	Total
1st place, gold medalist(s)	Yelena Shushunova (URS)	10.000	10.000	20.000
1st place, gold medalist(s)	Daniela Silivaș (ROU)	10.000	10.000	20.000
3rd place, bronze medalist(s)	Aurelia Dobre (ROU)	9.988	9.962	19.950
4	Svetlana Baitova (URS)	9.950	9.900	19.850
5	Dörte Thümmler (GDR)	9.900	9.850	19.750
6	Chen Cuiting (CHN)	9.812	9.825	19.637
7	Martina Jentsch (GDR)	9.425	9.812	19.237
8	Sabrina Mar (USA)	8.850	9.850	18.700

== Medals ==
Rank	Nation	Gold	Silver	Bronze	Total
1	Soviet Union (URS)	8	7	3	18
2	Romania (ROU)	5	1	4	10
3	China (CHN)	2	2	0	4
4	East Germany (GDR)	2	0	4	6
5	Hungary (HUN)	1	0	1	2
6	Canada (CAN)	0	1	0	1
7	Bulgaria (BUL)	0	0	3	3
Totals (7 entries)		18	11	15	44
