= Dörte Thümmler =

German gymnast

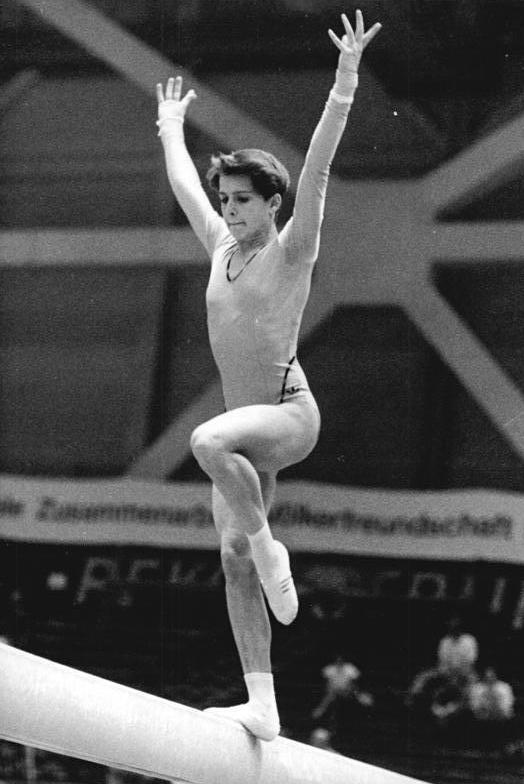
- Thümmler in 1988

Personal information
- Born: 29 October 1971 (age 54) East Berlin, East Germany

Gymnastics career
- Discipline: Women's artistic gymnastics
- Country represented: East Germany
Medal record
Olympic Games
Bronze medal – third place	1988 Seoul	Team
World Championships
Gold medal – first place	1987 Rotterdam	Uneven bars
Bronze medal – third place	1987 Rotterdam	Team
European Championships
Bronze medal – third place	1987 Moscow	Uneven bars

Dörte Thümmler (born 29 October 1971) is a German former artistic gymnast who competed for East Germany. In 1987, she was World Champion on the uneven bars (tied with Daniela Silivaș), and she won bronze in the team event at the 1988 Summer Olympics.

== Career ==
Thümmler began ice skating at age four and wanted to train in figure skating. However, her mother, a youth gymnastics coach, enrolled her in gymnastics instead. She moved to a boarding school at age 8 to train more intensively.

As a gymnast, Thümmler experienced verbal and physical physical abuse; one of her early coaches was banned from competition after nearly breaking her neck. In addition, from the age of about 11, she was experimented on as part of the East German doping program without her knowledge. Her stepfather, Manfred Thümmler, was head of sports medicine at SC Dynamo Berlin and a defendant in a 1999 doping trial, though his charges were dropped.

At age 11, she said that she wanted to quit; this resulted in being told by trainers, physiotherapists, and officials that she could not, and her parents wanted her to continue training.

Thümmler competed for the club SC Dynamo Berlin.

She competed at the 1987 European Championships, where she was 15th in the all-around but won bronze in the uneven bars final. Later that year, at the 1987 World Championships, she earned a perfect 10 score on the uneven bars and won gold, which she shared with Daniela Silivaș. Her victory was considered a surprise. In the team event, she contributed the highest total score to the East German team's bronze.

The next year, Thümmler won bronze with the East German team at the 1988 Summer Olympics. Individually, she was 7th in the all-around. She also reached the uneven bars final, where she was fourth, and the floor exercise final, where she was 8th.

Thümmler's career was ended that year at the age of 16 from back pain.

== Post-competitive career ==
Thümmler wanted to be a gymnastics choreographer, but her back injury prevented her from doing so. Instead she trained and worked as a restaurant clerk, but she had to retire at age 38 due to ill health, in part caused by the effects of forced state-sponsored doping.

After the birth of her second son in 2008, she began to teach children's gymnastics classes as well as dance and choreography, but her health soon broke down again, and she went on a full disability pension in 2010. In 2018, she began to speak publicly about her experience with East German doping.

== Personal life ==
She has two sons. She suffers from myalgic encephalomyelitis/chronic fatigue syndrome and in 2018, was diagnosed as having thirty percent of the typical strength for her age.

== Competitive history ==
Year	Event	Team	AA	VT	UB	BB	FX
Junior
1985	Junior Friendship Tournament		48				
1986	Cottbus International				2nd place, silver medalist(s)		
1986	Junior European Championships		16				
1986	Junior Friendship Tournament	4	9	6	6		3rd place, bronze medalist(s)
1986	Jr. GDR-USSR Dual Meet		5	3rd place, bronze medalist(s)		6	
Senior
1987	Chunichi Cup		3rd place, bronze medalist(s)		1st place, gold medalist(s)	5	1st place, gold medalist(s)
1987	Cottbus International		7		2nd place, silver medalist(s)		5
1987	DTV Cup		3rd place, bronze medalist(s)				
1987	European Championships		15		3rd place, bronze medalist(s)		
1987	GDR Championships		6		1st place, gold medalist(s)		
1987	HOL-HUN-GDR Meet	1st place, gold medalist(s)	1st place, gold medalist(s)				
1987	Tokyo Cup				3rd place, bronze medalist(s)		4
1987	World Championships	3rd place, bronze medalist(s)	6		1st place, gold medalist(s)		5
1988	Cottbus International		6		1st place, gold medalist(s)	1st place, gold medalist(s)	
1988	GDR Championships		2nd place, silver medalist(s)	5	2nd place, silver medalist(s)	1st place, gold medalist(s)	1st place, gold medalist(s)
1988	Olympic Games	3rd place, bronze medalist(s)	7		4		8
