= Valeri Liukin =

Kazakh-American gymnast

- Валерий Люкин
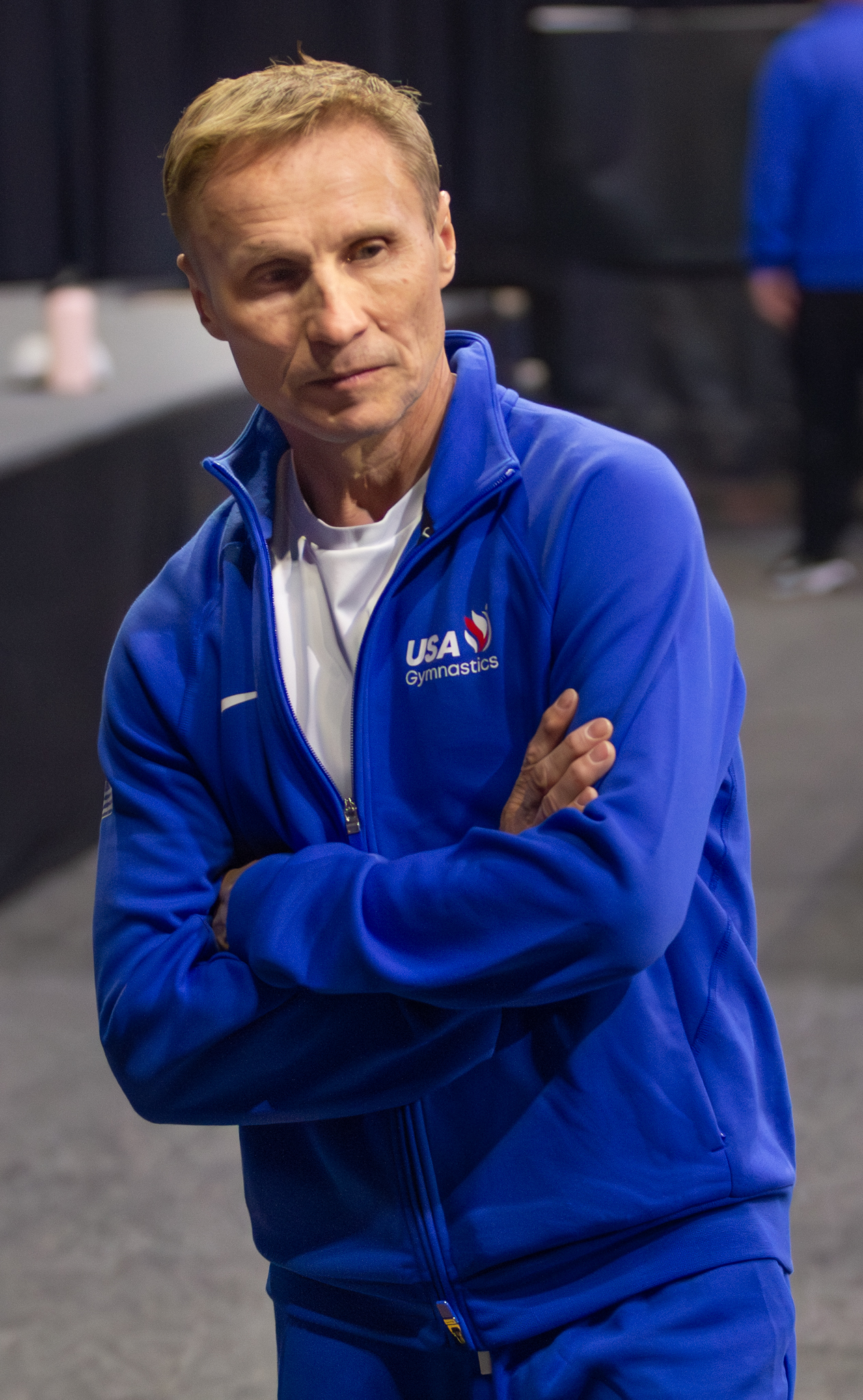
- Liukin as a coach at the 2026 American Cup

Personal information
- Full name: Valeri Viktorovich Liukin
- Born: 17 December 1966 (age 59) Aktyubinsk, Kazakh SSR, Soviet Union
- Height: 5 ft 4 in (1.63 m)
- Spouse: Anna Kotchneva (m. 1988)
- Relatives: Nastia Liukin (daughter)

Gymnastics career
- Discipline: Men's artistic gymnastics
- Country represented: Kazakhstan
- Former countries represented: Soviet Union
- Retired: 6 October 1994
Medal record
Men's Artistic Gymnastics
Representing Soviet Union
Olympic Games
Gold medal – first place	1988 Seoul	Team
Gold medal – first place	1988 Seoul	Horizontal bar
Silver medal – second place	1988 Seoul	All-around
Silver medal – second place	1988 Seoul	Parallel bars
World Championships
Gold medal – first place	1987 Rotterdam	Team
Gold medal – first place	1991 Indianapolis	Team
Bronze medal – third place	1991 Indianapolis	All-around
European Championships
Gold medal – first place	1987 Moscow	All-Around
Gold medal – first place	1987 Moscow	Floor
Gold medal – first place	1987 Moscow	Parallel bars
Gold medal – first place	1987 Moscow	Horizontal bar
Silver medal – second place	1987 Moscow	Rings
Bronze medal – third place	1987 Moscow	Vault

Valeri Viktorovich Liukin (Russian: Валерий Викторович Люкин; born 17 December 1966) is a Kazakh and American former artistic gymnast currently working as a gymnastics coach. Representing the former Soviet Union, Liukin was the 1988 Olympic champion in the team competition and individually on the horizontal bar, and Olympic silver medalist in the all-around and the parallel bars.

Liukin was the first man to do a triple back flip on floor and both a layout Tkatchev and a Jaeger with full twist on high bar. He also has one of the most difficult skills in men's artistic gymnastics named after him, the triple back (tucked) somersault.

== Gymnastics career ==
Liukin began gymnastics when he was 7 years old. He moved to Moscow to join the Soviet Junior National team, where he made his international debut at the 1983 Friendship Cup.

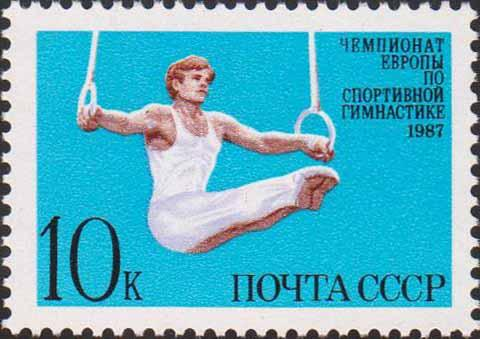
Liukin on a 1987 Soviet stamp

At the 1987 European Championships in Moscow, he won gold medals in the all-around, on the horizontal bar, and in the floor exercise where he was the first gymnast to perform a triple back somersault. He also won the silver medal on the still rings and the bronze on the vault. At the 1987 World Championships in Rotterdam, he won the team competition with the Soviet Union. At the 1988 Summer Olympics in Seoul, South Korea, Liukin won the gold medal in the team competition and was the co-champion on the horizontal bar with fellow Soviet gymnast Vladimir Artemov. Liukin won the silver medal in the all-around and on the parallel bars. At the 1991 World Championships in Indianapolis, he again was a member of the champion Soviet team in the team competition. He won the bronze medal in the all-around behind teammates Grigory Misutin and Vitaly Scherbo.

Following the dissolution of the Soviet Union, Liukin competed for his native Kazakhstan, most notably at the 1993 World Championships and the 1994 Asian Games, but he did not win a medal at either competition.

== Coaching career ==
In 1994, Liukin, alongside business partner Yevgeny Marchenko, opened World Olympic Gymnastics Academy (WOGA).

Liukin was the International Coach of the Year in 2000 and 2004. He was inducted into the International Gymnastics Hall of Fame in 2005.

Liukin coached his daughter, Nastia Liukin, who would go on to become the 2008 Olympic all-around champion. In addition, Nastia won silver medals with the team and on uneven bars and balance beam and won a bronze medal on floor exercise.

Liukin also coached 6-time World medalist Rebecca Bross, World bronze medalist Ivana Hong, as well as 2011 junior national champion and 2013 American Cup champion Katelyn Ohashi.

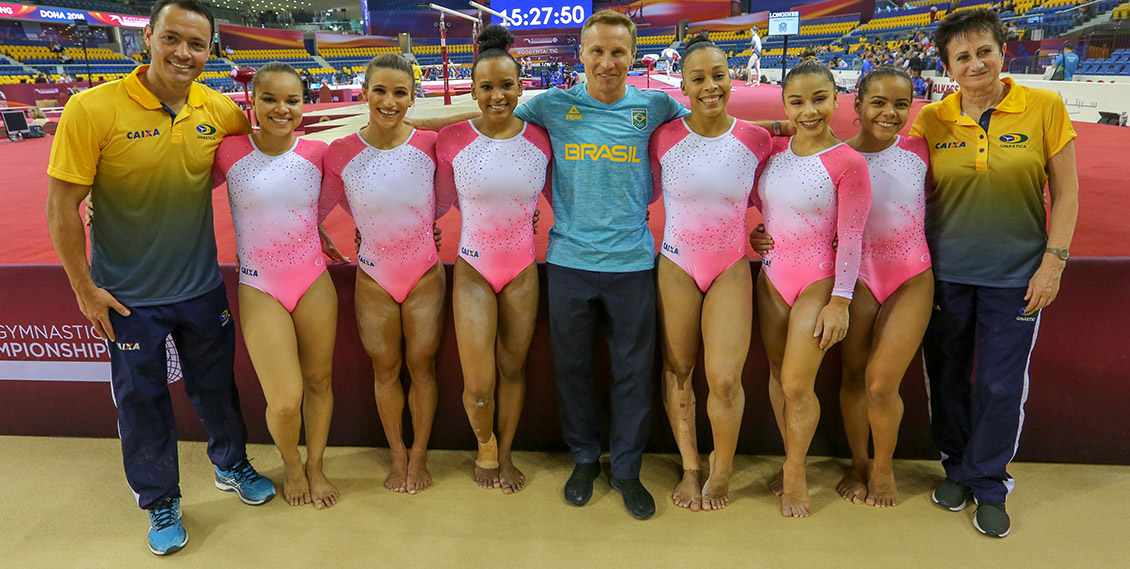
Liukin (center) coaching the Brazilian team at the 2018 World Championships

In 2013 Liukin stepped back from club coaching and became the elite development coordinator for USA Gymnastics. On 15 December 2015, it was announced that Liukin had been inducted as part of the 2016 class into the USA Gymnastics Hall of Fame. On 16 September 2016, he was named the coordinator for the United States women's national gymnastics team, replacing the retiring Márta Károlyi. On 2 February 2018, Liukin resigned from this role amid the USA Gymnastics sex abuse scandal.

He coached the Brazilian women's national gymnastics team from 2018–2019.

In 2020, Liukin returned to coaching at WOGA. Between 2022–2024, he was coaching Gabby Douglas in her comeback attempt. In 2022, Liukin also starting coaching Hezly Rivera, who would go to win a gold medal at the 2024 Olympic Games with the United States team.

== Controversies ==
Several gymnasts trained by Liukin, including Megan Marenghi, Katelyn Ohashi and Vanessa Atler, have come forward and accused Liukin of repeatedly shaming them about their weight even as young adolescents, leading several of them to develop eating disorders and depression. In 2022, Liukin was under investigation by the United States Center for SafeSport for allegedly verbally and psychologically abusing athletes and pressuring them to train or compete with broken bones or while ill.

== Personal life ==
He married Anna Kotchneva, a 1987 World Champion rhythmic gymnast, while still competing himself. Their daughter, Nastia Liukin, was born in Moscow in 1989. In 1992, Liukin moved to the United States and began a coaching career. Liukin originally settled in New Orleans, but later moved to Plano, Texas.

He had a small cameo in the film Stick It as the spotter in his daughter's uneven bars routine.
