= Kim Eun-mi =

Kim Eun-mi may refer to:

- Kim Eun-mi (handballer)
- Kim Eun-mi (gymnast)
