= Gymnastics at the 1988 Summer Olympics =

Gymnastics at the Games of the XXIV Olympiad
- Venue: Olympic Gymnastics Arena
- Dates: 18 – 30 September 1988

At the 1988 Summer Olympics, two different gymnastics disciplines were contested: artistic gymnastics and rhythmic gymnastics. The artistic gymnastics events were held at the Olympic Gymnastics Hall in Seoul from September 18 through 25th. The rhythmic gymnastics events were held at the same venue from September 28 through 30th.

For the first time in Olympic competition, each routine in women's artistic gymnastics events was judged by six judges, with the final score composed of the average of the judges' scores, after the highest and lowest marks were dropped. Men's routines continued to be judged by four judges, as at previous Olympics.

== Artistic gymnastics ==
=== Format of competition ===
The gymnastics competition at the 1988 Summer Olympics was carried out in three stages:

- Competition I - The team competition/qualification round in which all gymnasts, including those who were not part of a team, performed both compulsory and optional exercises. The top five scores per team on each exercise determined the final score of the team. The thirty-six highest scoring gymnasts in the all-around qualified to the individual all-around competition. The eight highest scoring gymnasts on each apparatus qualified to the final for that apparatus.
- Competition II - The individual all-around competition, in which those who qualified from Competition I performed exercises on each apparatus. The final score of each gymnast was composed of half the points earned by that gymnast during Competition I and all of the points earned by him or her in Competition II.
- Competition III - The apparatus finals, in which those who qualified during Competition I performed an exercise on the individual apparatus on which he or she had qualified. The final score of each gymnast was composed of half the points earned by that gymnast on that particular apparatus during Competition I and all of the points earned by him or her on that particular apparatus in Competition III.

Each country was limited to three gymnasts in the all-around final and two gymnasts in each apparatus final.

=== Men's events ===
Games	Gold	Silver	Bronze
Team all-around	Soviet Union; Vladimir Artemov; Dmitri Bilozertchev; Vladimir Gogoladze; Sergei Kharkov; Valeri Liukin; Vladimir Novikov	East Germany; Holger Behrendt; Ralf Büchner; Ulf Hoffmann; Sylvio Kroll; Sven Tippelt; Andreas Wecker	Japan; Yukio Iketani; Hiroyuki Konishi; Koichi Mizushima; Daisuke Nishikawa; Toshiharu Sato; Takahiro Yameda
Individual all-around	Vladimir Artemov; Soviet Union	Valeri Liukin; Soviet Union	Dmitry Bilozerchev; Soviet Union
Floor exercise	Sergei Kharkov; Soviet Union	Vladimir Artemov; Soviet Union	Lou Yun; China
Floor exercise	Sergei Kharkov; Soviet Union	Vladimir Artemov; Soviet Union	Yukio Iketani; Japan
Pommel horse	Lyubomir Gueraskov; Bulgaria	none awarded	none awarded
Pommel horse	Zsolt Borkai; Hungary	none awarded	none awarded
Pommel horse	Dmitri Bilozertchev; Soviet Union	none awarded	none awarded
Rings	Holger Behrendt; East Germany	none awarded	Sven Tippelt; East Germany
Rings	Dimitri Bilozertchev; Soviet Union	none awarded	Sven Tippelt; East Germany
Vault	Lou Yun; China	Sylvio Kroll; East Germany	Park Jong-Hoon; South Korea
Parallel bars	Vladimir Artemov; Soviet Union	Valeri Liukin; Soviet Union	Sven Tippelt; East Germany
Horizontal bar	Vladimir Artemov; Soviet Union	none awarded	Holger Behrendt; East Germany
Horizontal bar	Valeri Liukin; Soviet Union	none awarded	Marius Gherman; Romania

=== Women's events ===
Games	Gold	Silver	Bronze
Team all-around	Soviet Union; Svetlana Baitova; Svetlana Boginskaya; Natalia Laschenova; Elena Shevchenko; Elena Shushunova; Olga Strazheva	Romania; Aurelia Dobre; Eugenia Golea; Celestina Popa; Gabriela Potorac; Daniela Silivaș; Camelia Voinea	East Germany; Gabriele Fähnrich; Martina Jentsch; Dagmar Kersten; Ulrike Klotz; Bettina Schieferdecker; Dörte Thümmler
Individual all-around	Elena Shushunova; Soviet Union	Daniela Silivaș; Romania	Svetlana Boginskaya; Soviet Union
Vault	Svetlana Boginskaya; Soviet Union	Gabriela Potorac; Romania	Daniela Silivaș; Romania
Uneven bars	Daniela Silivaș; Romania	Dagmar Kersten; East Germany	Elena Shushunova; Soviet Union
Balance beam	Daniela Silivaș; Romania	Elena Shushunova; Soviet Union	Gabriela Potorac; Romania
Balance beam	Daniela Silivaș; Romania	Elena Shushunova; Soviet Union	Phoebe Mills; United States
Floor exercise	Daniela Silivaș; Romania	Svetlana Boginskaya; Soviet Union	Diana Doudeva; Bulgaria

== Rhythmic gymnastics ==
Rules for the rhythmic gymnastics competition also changed since the previous Olympics. The ball apparatus was replaced by the rope. Thirty-nine gymnasts competed in the preliminary round, the format for which was similar to the finals. The twenty best gymnasts competed in the finals. Each competitor's score in the preliminary round, divided by two (the "prelim" score) was added to gymnast's score in the finals (the "final" score).

Each of the routines was judged by six judges, highest and lowest marks were dropped, and an average of the four remaining ones was the gymnast's score for the routine.

Games	Gold	Silver	Bronze
Individual all-around	Marina Lobatch; Soviet Union	Adriana Dunavska; Bulgaria	Alexandra Timoshenko; Soviet Union

== Medal summary ==
Rank	Nation	Gold	Silver	Bronze	Total
1	Soviet Union	12	5	4	21
2	Romania	3	3	3	9
3	East Germany	1	3	4	8
4	Bulgaria	1	1	1	3
5	China	1	0	1	2
6	Hungary	1	0	0	1
7	Japan	0	0	2	2
8	South Korea	0	0	1	1
8	United States	0	0	1	1
Totals (9 entries)		19	12	17	48
