= Daniela Silivaș =

Romanian artistic gymnast (born 1972)

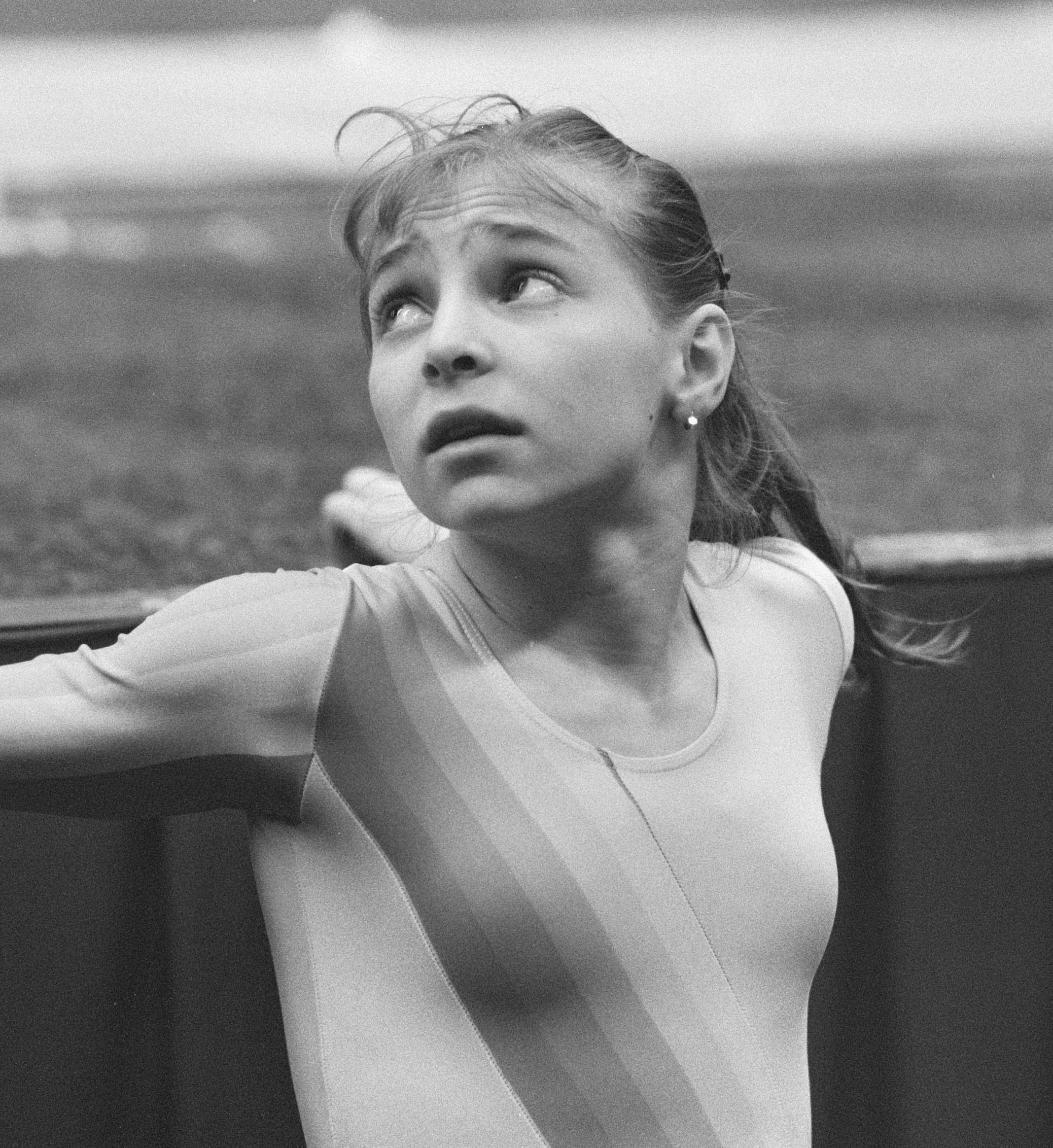
- Silivaș in 1987

Personal information
- Full name: Daniela Viorica Silivaș-Harper
- Nickname: Dana
- Born: 9 May 1972 (age 54) Deva, Romania
- Height: 1.45 m (4 ft 9 in)

Gymnastics career
- Discipline: Women's artistic gymnastics
- Country represented: Romania (1985–1989)
- Gym: Deva National Training Center
- Head coaches: Adrian Goreac, Maria Cosma, Octavian Bellu
- Former coaches: Béla Károlyi, Márta Károlyi
- Music: 1985–1986: "Turkey in the Straw"/"Cotton Eye Joe"; 1987: "Ochi Chernye"/"Dark Eyes"; 1988: "Macho Mozart" by the Latin Rascals; 1989: "Ciuleandra"
- Eponymous skills: Silivaș mount (balance beam): shoulder stand–pirouette to chest stand; floor: double twisting double back tucked somersault
- Retired: 1991
Medal record
Olympic Games
Gold medal – first place	1988 Seoul	Uneven Bars
Gold medal – first place	1988 Seoul	Balance Beam
Gold medal – first place	1988 Seoul	Floor Exercise
Silver medal – second place	1988 Seoul	Team
Silver medal – second place	1988 Seoul	All-Around
Bronze medal – third place	1988 Seoul	Vault
World Championships
Gold medal – first place	1985 Montreal	Balance Beam
Gold medal – first place	1987 Rotterdam	Team
Gold medal – first place	1987 Rotterdam	Uneven Bars
Gold medal – first place	1987 Rotterdam	Floor Exercise
Gold medal – first place	1989 Stuttgart	Uneven Bars
Gold medal – first place	1989 Stuttgart	Balance Beam
Gold medal – first place	1989 Stuttgart	Floor Exercise
Silver medal – second place	1985 Montreal	Team
Silver medal – second place	1989 Stuttgart	Team
Bronze medal – third place	1987 Rotterdam	All-Around
World Cup Final
Silver medal – second place	1986 Beijing	All-Around
Silver medal – second place	1986 Beijing	Balance Beam
Bronze medal – third place	1986 Beijing	Uneven Bars
European Championships
Gold medal – first place	1987 Moscow	All-Around
Gold medal – first place	1987 Moscow	Uneven Bars
Gold medal – first place	1987 Moscow	Balance Beam
Gold medal – first place	1987 Moscow	Floor Exercise
Gold medal – first place	1989 Brussels	Floor Exercise
Silver medal – second place	1987 Moscow	Vault
Silver medal – second place	1989 Brussels	All-Around
Silver medal – second place	1989 Brussels	Uneven Bars
Bronze medal – third place	1985 Helsinki	Floor Exercise
Bronze medal – third place	1989 Brussels	Balance Beam

Daniela Viorica Silivaș-Harper (née Silivaș, Romanian: [daniˈela vi.oˈrika siliˈvaʃ]; born 9 May 1972) is a Romanian former artistic gymnast best known for medaling in every single event at one Olympics, winning six medals (three gold, two silver, and one bronze) at the 1988 Summer Games in Seoul. In doing so, she was the fourth female gymnast to achieve this, after Maria Gorokhovskaya (1952), Larisa Latynina (1960, 1964) and Věra Čáslavská (1968). As of 2024, Silivaș is the last gymnast, male or female, to have accomplished this feat.

Also, Silivaș is the first gymnast in history to win 3 Olympic and World individual titles on three (from four) apparatus: uneven bars and floor (1988 OG, 1987 and 1989 WC) and beam (1988 OG, 1985 and 1989 WC), an achievement equaled only by Simone Biles, 20 years later. She won 16 Olympic and World medals, 10 of which were gold. In 1987, she dominated the European Championships held in Moscow, medaling on every single event: 4 gold (individual AA, bars, beam and floor) and silver on vault. During her career, she earned 24 perfect 10 scores, of which 7 were earned in Seoul, equaling 1976 Nadia Comăneci's record. She was named the BTA Best Balkan Athlete of the Year in 1988.

Silivaș was chosen as one of the "Top Ten All-Around Gymnasts of All Time", in a poll in Inside Gymnastics magazine. She was known for her technical excellence, difficult routines, charming performances, and artistic flair.

In 1989, Silivaș's training was hampered by a knee injury and by the closure of the Deva National Training Center during the Romanian Revolution. She retired in 1991 and moved to the United States, where she is now a gymnastics coach. In 2002, she was inducted into the International Gymnastics Hall of Fame.

== Early life and career ==
Silivaș was born in Deva, Romania, on 9 May 1972. She began gymnastics at age 6 and was coached by Béla Károlyi for six months before his defection in 1981. Silivaș won her school's championships in 1980, and was the Romanian junior national champion in 1981 and 1982. She continued to compete in various junior meets through 1984, with a particularly strong showing at the 1984 Junior European Championships, where she won the balance beam title, earned silver medals on the uneven bars and floor exercise, and placed fourth in the all-around. At the 1984 Junior Friendship Tournament (Druzhba), she won gold medals in the all-around and uneven bars over a strong field that included future Olympic and World medalists Svetlana Boguinskaya, Aurelia Dobre, and Dagmar Kersten.

== Senior career ==
=== Age falsification ===
In 1985, the Romanian Gymnastics Federation changed Silivaș's birth year from 1972 to 1970 to make her age eligible for the World Championships in Montreal. The falsification was suspected by some, but was never proven until Silivaș herself revealed it in 2002. She stated that she was never consulted about the matter: officials simply gave her a new passport, called her attention to the birth date, and informed her that she was now 15.

=== 1985–1987 ===
Although she was only 13 at the 1985 Worlds, Silivaș scored a perfect 10 en route to capturing the balance beam title, defeating the reigning Olympic champion, her teammate Ecaterina Szabo, in the process. She finished behind reigning co-world champion Yelena Shushunova in the individual all-around at the 1986 World Cup and quickly established herself as the leader of the Romanian gymnastics team.

Silivaș's greatest triumph took place at the 1987 European Gymnastics Championships in Moscow, where she won the individual all-around, uneven bars, balance beam and floor exercise titles in addition to taking a silver medal on the vault. At the time, every dominant nation in women's gymnastics was located in Europe, and winning the European title over a deep field of Soviet, East German, and Bulgarian gymnasts was a major victory.

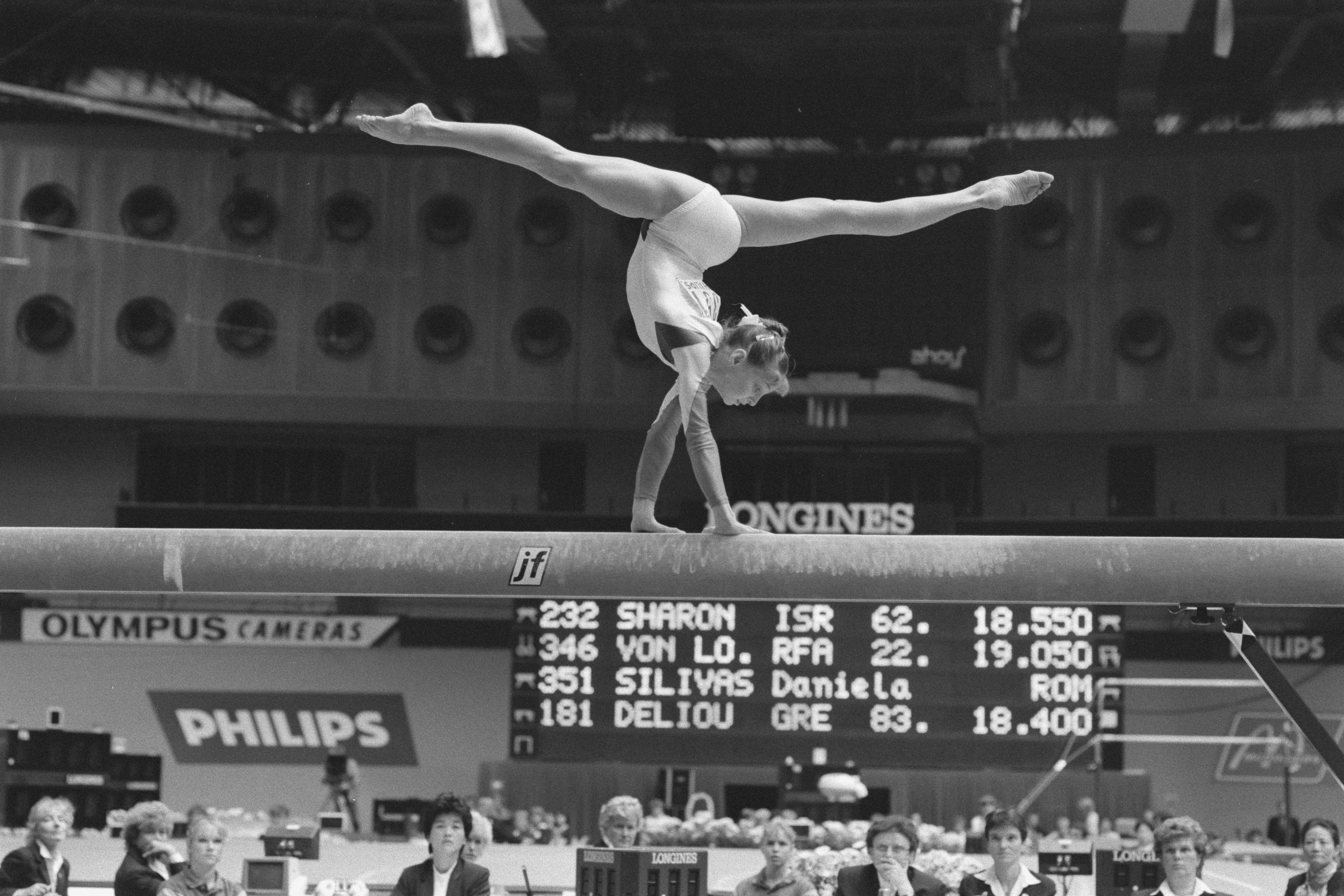
Silivaș at the 1987 World Championships

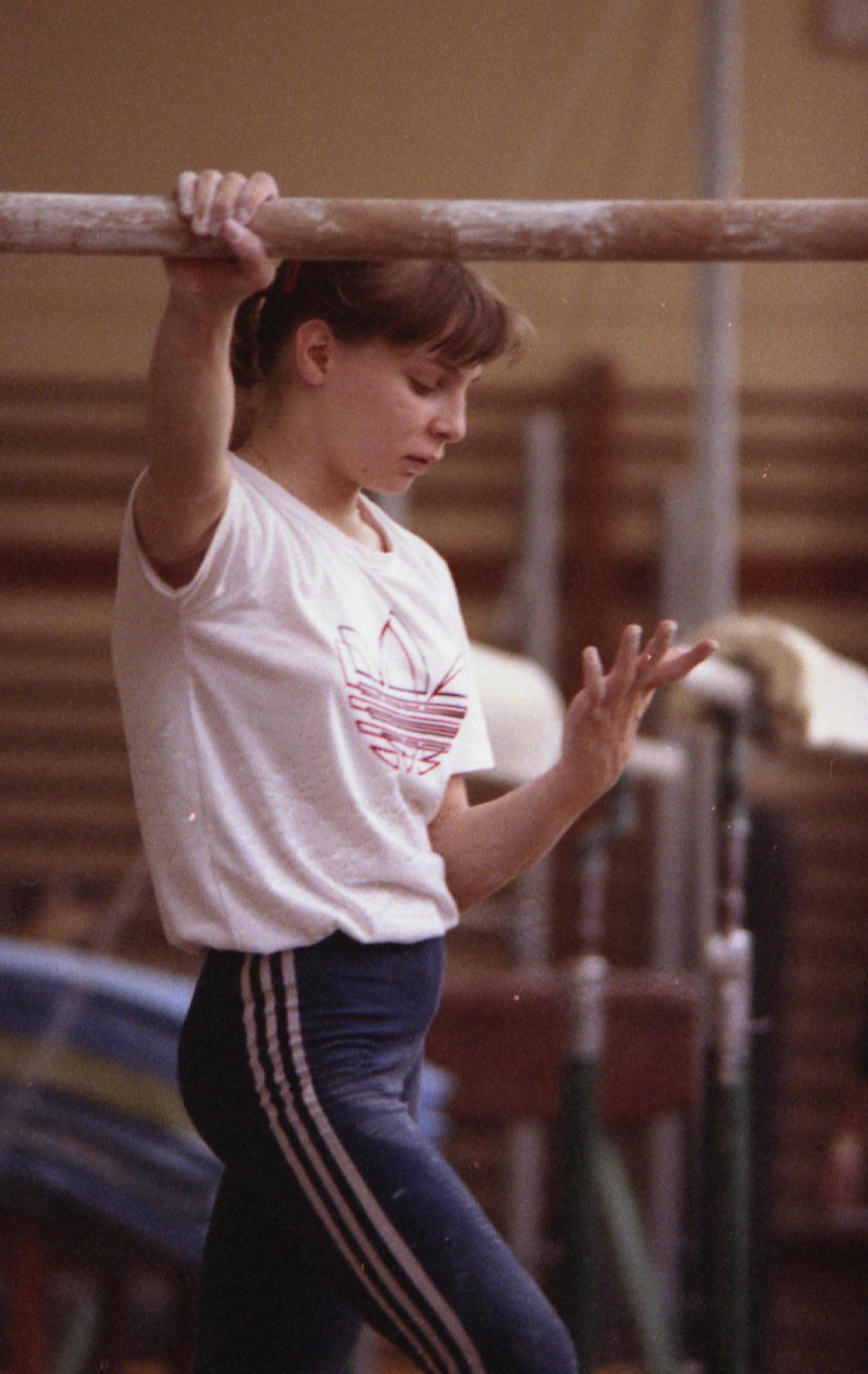
Silivaș before her routine on the uneven bars; Bucharest, 1989

At the 1987 World Championships in Rotterdam, Silivaș helped the Romanian squad win the team title, defeating the Soviet team for the first time since 1979. She was a favorite for the all-around title, but—hampered by low scores carried over from the team optionals, where she had fallen on the balance beam on a split leap, as well as a shaky uneven bars routine in the all-around—she still managed to win the bronze medal behind teammate Aurelia Dobre and Shushunova, especially due to her strong scores, including two perfect 10.00s, during the team compulsory round. In the event finals, she won gold medals on the uneven bars and floor exercise.

=== 1988 Olympics ===
At the 1988 Olympics in Seoul, the Romanian team finished second to the Soviets. Individually, Silivaș was one of the favorites, along with Dobre and Shushunova, for the all-around title.

The all-around was a hotly anticipated battle between Silivaș, the technician and dancer, and Shushunova, the powerhouse and tumbler. Both received scores of 10.0 on floor. Shushunova received her second 10.0 on vault; Silivaș received hers on the uneven bars. Silivaș was in the lead entering the final rotation, but a score of 9.950 on the vault dropped her to second place, 0.025 behind Shushunova.

Silivaș's score on vault came under particular scrutiny. Of the six judges on the panel, three gave her first vault a 10.0; two others gave her 9.9s. However, the Soviet judge on the panel, Nellie Kim, gave her a 9.8. On her second vault, Silivaș took a hop on her landing; all six judges gave her 9.9s. Silivaș was visibly upset after Shushunova's scores were posted and at the medal ceremony; according to a report in International Gymnast, she said, "After my last vault, I thought maybe I should be the champion." However, she did not argue the results publicly. Her former coach, Bela Károlyi, noted, "This kid had the honesty and decency to shut up. She didn’t want to say 'I’m better' because she knows Shushunova is the Olympic champion, but she couldn’t praise a rival. So she just didn’t say a word. These kids have more decency than all the judges and coaches in the world."

In spite of the controversy, no score protests were ever filed by Silivaș, her coaches, or her federation, and no disciplinary measures were taken against any of the judges. In addition, even though Kim's first mark was considered questionable by many fans, it did not figure into Silivaș's final score: in 1988, the highest and lowest marks of the panel were dropped, and the final score was the average of the remaining four marks. Also, in spite of her vault score, Silivaș's all-around total was higher than that of Shushunova: if the competition had been held under the New Life rule, she would have won. In the third rotation, Shushunova was awarded 10s for her floor exercise by every judge except the Romanian judge, who gave her a 9.9, which did not count towards her final score.

Silivaș returned in the event finals to win gold medals on the uneven bars, floor, and beam, as well as bronze on vault behind Soviet Svetlana Boguinskaya (gold) and teammate Gabriela Potorac (silver). In doing this, she became the only gymnast in Seoul to win medals in every event (team, all-around, and the four apparatus finals). She also equaled Nadia Comăneci's record of seven perfect 10 scores in a single Olympic Games.

=== Post-Olympics ===
Despite a serious knee injury in 1989, Silivaș successfully defended her floor exercise title at the European Championships and won three additional medals. In the all-around, she placed second to Svetlana Boguinskaya. Still injured, she went to the 1989 World Championships, where she placed 12th in the all-around after falling from the balance beam. In event finals, however, she captured three more gold medals on the bars, beam, and floor.

After several more competitions in 1989, Silivaș underwent surgery on her knee. She intended to start training again afterwards, but the National Training Center at Deva was closed during the Romanian Revolution of 1989, putting an early end to her career.

== Life after gymnastics ==
Silivaș retired from gymnastics in 1991 and moved to the United States, settling in Atlanta. In 2002, she was inducted into the International Gymnastics Hall of Fame; she still holds the record as the youngest gymnast to receive this honor.

Silivaș works full-time as a gymnastics coach at Jump Start Gymnasium in Sandy Springs, Georgia. In May 2003, she married Scott Harper, a sports management graduate living in the Atlanta area. The couple have three children: two sons, Jadan Scott (born 8 April 2004) and Rylan Bryce Harper (born October 2009), and a daughter, Ava Luciana (born 8 November 2005). They live in Marietta, Georgia.

== Skills ==
The hallmarks of Silivaș's gymnastics were her impeccable form and execution, difficulty, and expressive dance. Many of the skills she performed in the 1988 Olympics still carry high difficulty ratings in the Code of Points today including the "Silivas" on floor, which is a double-twisting double back tucked somersault and has the third highest difficulty assignment of "H" in women's gymnastics. Between 1985 and 1988, the highlights of Silivaș's routines included:

Vault

- Tucked Yurchenko full
- Layout Yurchenko full

Uneven bars

- Stalder 1/2 pirouette directly into Endo 1/2 pirouette
- Straddled Deltchev
- Straddled Tkatchev
- Shaposhnikova transition
- Free hip frontaway to front 1/2 dismount

Balance beam

- The "Silivaș" mount: shoulder stand–pirouette to chest stand
- Back handspring, two layout step-outs
- Back handspring, layout on two feet
- Aerial front walkover
- Double back tuck dismount

Floor exercise

- "Back to back" tumbling: Round-off, back handspring, double twist, punch front, round-off, back handspring, double twist, punch front.
- Triple twist
- Double twisting double back tuck ("Silivaș")
- Tucked full-in
- Piked full-in
- Double back tuck
- Double tour–double pirouette
- The "Silivaș" skill, which involved spinning on the ankles

=== Eponymous skills ===
Silivaș has two eponymous skills listed in the Code of Points.

Apparatus	Name	Description	Difficulty (Note: Valid for the 2025–2028 Code of Points)
Balance beam	Silivaș	Jump with ½ turn (180°) over shoulder to neck stand, ½ turn (180°) to chest stand	B (0.2)
Floor exercise	Silivaș	Double salto backward tucked with 2/1 turn (720°)	H (0.8)

== Competitive history ==
Year	Event	Team	AA	VT	UB	BB	FX
Junior
1981	Daciada		1st place, gold medalist(s)				
1982	Junior Romanian Championships		1st place, gold medalist(s)	1st place, gold medalist(s)		1st place, gold medalist(s)	1st place, gold medalist(s)
1982	Peace Cup		1st place, gold medalist(s)				
1982	Romanian Cup		1st place, gold medalist(s)				
1983	International Junior Championships		1st place, gold medalist(s)			4	1st place, gold medalist(s)
1983	Romanian Championships		1st place, gold medalist(s)				
1984	Blume Memorial		1st place, gold medalist(s)				
1984	Coca-Cola International		2nd place, silver medalist(s)		3rd place, bronze medalist(s)	3rd place, bronze medalist(s)	
1984	Junior Balkan Championships		1st place, gold medalist(s)				
1984	Junior European Championships		4		2nd place, silver medalist(s)	1st place, gold medalist(s)	2nd place, silver medalist(s)
1984	Junior Friendship Tournament	2nd place, silver medalist(s)	1st place, gold medalist(s)		1st place, gold medalist(s)	4	3rd place, bronze medalist(s)
1984	Moscow News		8	8		1st place, gold medalist(s)	5
1984	Paris Grand Prix		2nd place, silver medalist(s)			1st place, gold medalist(s)	
1984	Riga International		2nd place, silver medalist(s)	1st place, gold medalist(s)	2nd place, silver medalist(s)	2nd place, silver medalist(s)	1st place, gold medalist(s)
Senior
1985 (Note: Daniela's age was falsified in order for her to compete at the World Championships.)	McDonald's American Cup		3rd place, bronze medalist(s)			1st place, gold medalist(s)	
1985	Balkan Championships	1st place, gold medalist(s)	3rd place, bronze medalist(s)		2nd place, silver medalist(s)	3rd place, bronze medalist(s)	2nd place, silver medalist(s)
1985	Champions All		1st place, gold medalist(s)				
1985	DTB Cup		5		5	1st place, gold medalist(s)	1st place, gold medalist(s)
1985	ESP-ROM Dual Meet	1st place, gold medalist(s)	1st place, gold medalist(s)				
1985	European Championships		8			5	3rd place, bronze medalist(s)
1985	FRG-ROM-SUI Tri-Meet	1st place, gold medalist(s)	3rd place, bronze medalist(s)				
1985	Gander Memorial		2nd place, silver medalist(s)				
1985	HOL-ROM Dual Meet	1st place, gold medalist(s)	2nd place, silver medalist(s)				
1985	International Championships of Romania		1st place, gold medalist(s)				
1985	International Mixed Pairs	3rd place, bronze medalist(s)					
1985	Romanian Championships		2nd place, silver medalist(s)			1st place, gold medalist(s)	1st place, gold medalist(s)
1985	ROM-CSSR Dual Meet	1st place, gold medalist(s)	4				
1985	World Championships	2nd place, silver medalist(s)	7			1st place, gold medalist(s)	4
1986	Ahoy Cup			3rd place, bronze medalist(s)	1st place, gold medalist(s)		1st place, gold medalist(s)
1986	Antibes International		1st place, gold medalist(s)				1st place, gold medalist(s)
1986	Balkan Championships	1st place, gold medalist(s)	1st place, gold medalist(s)		1st place, gold medalist(s)	1st place, gold medalist(s)	
1986	DTB Cup		1st place, gold medalist(s)		1st place, gold medalist(s)	1st place, gold medalist(s)	1st place, gold medalist(s)
1986	ESP-ROM-BUL Tri-Meet		1st place, gold medalist(s)				
1986	International Championships of Romania		1st place, gold medalist(s)		2nd place, silver medalist(s)	1st place, gold medalist(s)	1st place, gold medalist(s)
1986	Romanian Championships		1st place, gold medalist(s)		1st place, gold medalist(s)	1st place, gold medalist(s)	
1986	ROM-CSSR Dual Meet	1st place, gold medalist(s)	1st place, gold medalist(s)				
1986	World Cup		2nd place, silver medalist(s)	4	3rd place, bronze medalist(s)	2nd place, silver medalist(s)	4
1987	Avignon International		1st place, gold medalist(s)				
1987	DTB Cup		1st place, gold medalist(s)	2nd place, silver medalist(s)	3rd place, bronze medalist(s)	1st place, gold medalist(s)	1st place, gold medalist(s)
1987	European Championships		1st place, gold medalist(s)	2nd place, silver medalist(s)	1st place, gold medalist(s)	1st place, gold medalist(s)	1st place, gold medalist(s)
1987	Gander Memorial		2nd place, silver medalist(s)				
1987	ITA-ROM Dual Meet	1st place, gold medalist(s)	3rd place, bronze medalist(s)				
1987	Romanian Championships		1st place, gold medalist(s)		1st place, gold medalist(s)	1st place, gold medalist(s)	1st place, gold medalist(s)
1987	SUI-ROM Dual Meet	1st place, gold medalist(s)	2nd place, silver medalist(s)				
1987	Swiss Cup		1st place, gold medalist(s)				
1987	World Championships	1st place, gold medalist(s)	3rd place, bronze medalist(s)		1st place, gold medalist(s)		1st place, gold medalist(s)
1988	Chunichi Cup		1st place, gold medalist(s)	1st place, gold medalist(s)	1st place, gold medalist(s)	1st place, gold medalist(s)	1st place, gold medalist(s)
1988	DTB Cup		1st place, gold medalist(s)	2nd place, silver medalist(s)	2nd place, silver medalist(s)	1st place, gold medalist(s)	1st place, gold medalist(s)
1988	International Championships of Romania		1st place, gold medalist(s)	2nd place, silver medalist(s)	1st place, gold medalist(s)		
1988	Olympic Games	2nd place, silver medalist(s)	2nd place, silver medalist(s)	3rd place, bronze medalist(s)	1st place, gold medalist(s)	1st place, gold medalist(s)	1st place, gold medalist(s)
1988	ROM-CSSR-SUI Tri-Meet	1st place, gold medalist(s)	1st place, gold medalist(s)				
1988	Tokyo Cup				1st place, gold medalist(s)		1st place, gold medalist(s)
1989	Blume Memorial		1st place, gold medalist(s)				
1989	Chunichi Cup		4				
1989	European Championships		2nd place, silver medalist(s)	4	2nd place, silver medalist(s)	3rd place, bronze medalist(s)	1st place, gold medalist(s)
1989	French International		1st place, gold medalist(s)	6	2nd place, silver medalist(s)	1st place, gold medalist(s)	2nd place, silver medalist(s)
1989	International Championships of Romania		1st place, gold medalist(s)	2nd place, silver medalist(s)	1st place, gold medalist(s)	1st place, gold medalist(s)	1st place, gold medalist(s)
1989	Tokyo Cup					7	
1989	World Championships	2nd place, silver medalist(s)	12		1st place, gold medalist(s)	1st place, gold medalist(s)	1st place, gold medalist(s)
1991	World Professional Championships					6	6

== See also ==
- List of multiple Olympic medalists at a single Games
- List of Olympic female gymnasts for Romania
- List of top Olympic gymnastics medalists
- List of top medalists at the World Artistic Gymnastics Championships
