= Lucas and Marcus =

American dancing and YouTuber duo

- Born: Lucas Dobre-Mofid; Marcus Dobre-Mofid; January 28, 1999 (age 27); Gaithersburg, Maryland, U.S.
- Other name: Dobre Twins
- Occupation: YouTubers

Instagram information
- Page: Lucas and Marcus
- Years active: 2013–present
- Followers: 1.8 million

TikTok information
- Page: Lucas and Marcus
- Followers: 40.3 million

YouTube information
- Channels: Lucas and Marcus; Dobre Brothers; Dobre Cars
- Years active: 2011–present
- Subscribers: 37.1 million (Lucas and Marcus); 13.4 million (Dobre Brothers); 2.72 million (Dobre Cars)
- Views: 16.9 billion (Lucas and Marcus); 4.87 billion (Dobre Brothers); 679 million (Dobre Cars)
- Last updated: December 7, 2025

Lucas and Marcus Dobre-Mofid (born January 28, 1999), collectively known as the Dobre Twins, are an American dancing duo and YouTube personalities who rose to prominence on the now-defunct video application Vine. They are part of the Dobre Brothers, where they are joined by their older brothers, Cyrus and Darius.

The twins run their eponymous YouTube channel Lucas and Marcus while the brothers feature collectively on "Dobre Brothers" and "Dobre Cars". Their goals of subscribers on the channel Dobre Cars was 250M subscribers and 50M total views.

== Personal lives ==
The twins were born in Maryland to retired Olympic gymnast Aurelia Dobre and Boz Mofid, the owners of Dobre Gymnastics Academy in Gaithersburg, Maryland. They have two older brothers, Cyrus Dobre (born 1993) and Darius Dobre (born 1995).

== Career ==
=== Lucas and Marcus ===
Lucas and Marcus were known as "TwinBotz", they first gained fame on the six-second video application Vine, where they had more than 1.8 million followers before it shut down. The twins used the app to showcase their talent, including breakdancing and gymnastics stunts, such as backflips. Their popularity helped them earn a spot at AT&T's Later Haters expo.

=== Dobre Brothers ===
In March 2018, it was announced that the Dobre Brothers collectively have signed a joint venture deal with Creative Artists Agency (CAA).

== Awards and nominations ==
| Year | Award Show | Category | Work | Result |
|---|---|---|---|---|
| 2018 | Shorty Awards | Muser of the Year | Lucas and Marcus | Nominated |
| 2018 | Streamy Awards | Breakout Creator | Dobre Brothers | Nominated |
