= Vitaly Marinich =

Ukrainian gymnast (born 1970)

- Born: 23 November 1970 (age 55) Odessa, Ukrainian SSR, Soviet Union

Gymnastics career
- Country represented: Ukraine
- Former countries represented: Soviet Union
- Retired: yes
Medal record
Men's artistic gymnastics
World Championships
Representing Soviet Union
Gold medal – first place	1989 Stuttgart	Team
Bronze medal – third place	1989 Stuttgart	Rings
Representing Ukraine
Bronze medal – third place	1994 Dortmund	Team
Bronze medal – third place	1994 Brisbane	Pommel horse
European Championships
Representing Soviet Union
Silver medal – second place	1989 Stockholm	Rings
Silver medal – second place	1989 Stockholm	High bar
Representing Ukraine
Bronze medal – third place	1994 Prague	Pommel horse

Vitaly Marinich (Ukrainian: Маринич Віталій Анатолійович, Vitaly Marinich; born 23 November 1970) is a former gymnast that represented the Soviet Union and later Ukraine.

== Career ==
In 1988, Marinich became a silver medalist in all-around competition at the European Junior Championships, held in Avignon, France.

The following year, Marinich won a gold medal in team competition, representing the Soviet Union, and a bronze medalist in rings event at the World Artistic Gymnastics Championships in Stuttgart. He also received two silver medals in rings and high bar events at the European Artistic Gymnastics Championships in Stockholm.

In 1994, Marinich represented Ukraine at the World Championships in Brisbane (individual) and Dortmund (team), winning two silver medals in team competition and pommel horse event. He also became bronze medalist in pommel horse event at the European Championships in Prague.

== Later life ==
In 2010, he became a coach of the United States men's artistic gymnastics national team. Vitaly Marinitch was initially disciplined by USA Gymnastics after the accusation was made in August 2014. He was asked to resign two years later, in September 2016. Marinich was accused of handing down the back of a gymnast Alaina Legendre's pants.

In 2021, he became a coach of French men's artistic gymnastics national team, but he was laid off in 2023 due to alcohol problems.
