= Zsolt Borkai =

Hungarian gymnast (born 1965)

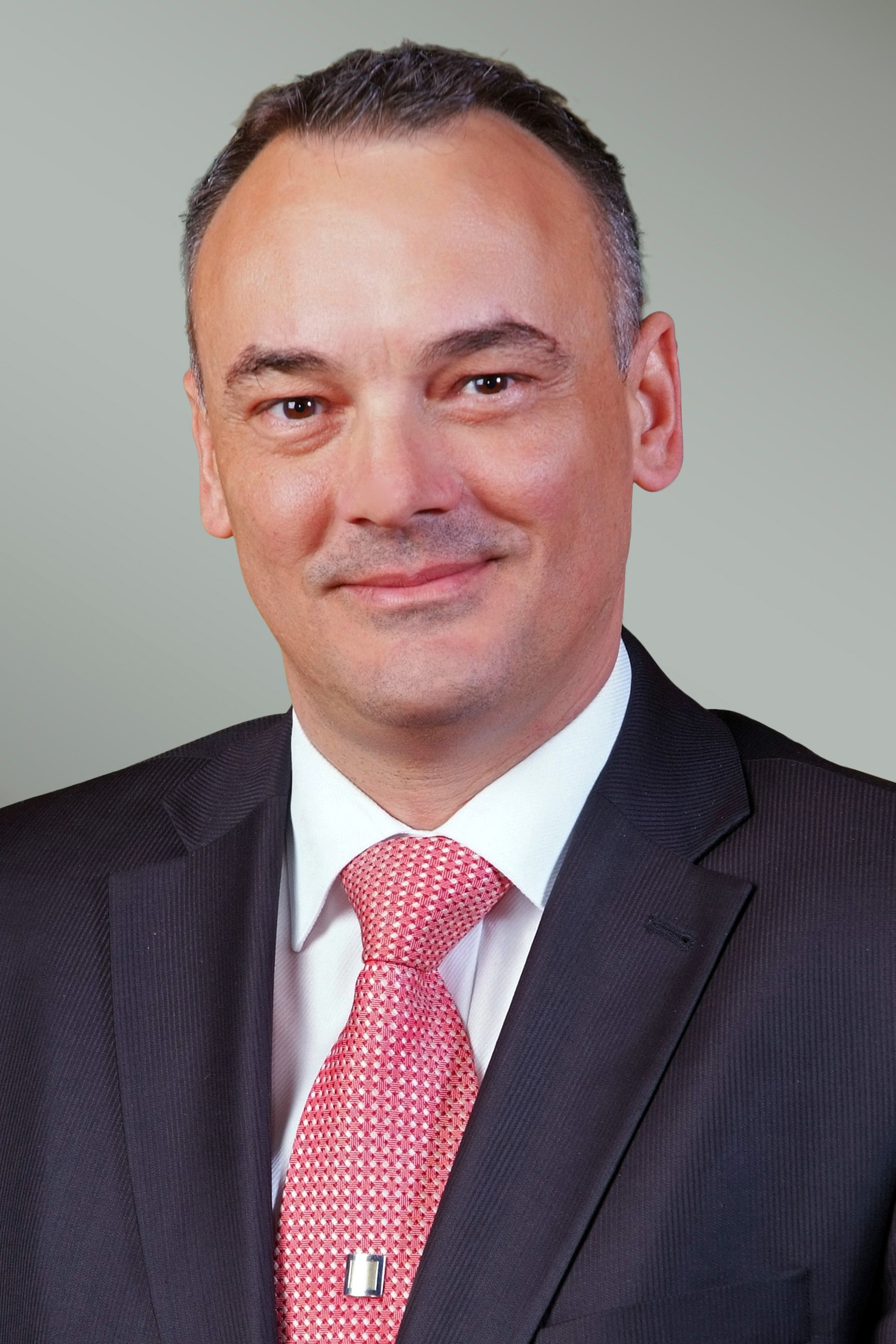
- Borkai in 2010

Personal information
- Born: 31 August 1965 (age 61) Győr, Hungary

Gymnastics career
- Discipline: Men's artistic gymnastics
- Country represented: Hungary
Medal record
Olympic Games
Gold medal – first place	1988 Seoul	Pommel horse
World Championships
Gold medal – first place	1987 Rotterdam	Pommel horse
Bronze medal – third place	1987 Rotterdam	Horizontal bar
European Championships
Gold medal – first place	1985 Oslo	Horizontal bar
Bronze medal – third place	1985 Oslo	Vault

Zsolt Borkai (born 31 August 1965) is a Hungarian Olympic gymnast champion and politician, who served as the mayor of Győr from 1 October 2006 to 8 November 2019. He was President of the Hungarian Olympic Committee (MOB) between 20 November 2010 and 2 May 2017.

He competed at the 1988 Summer Olympics in Seoul, where he won a gold medal in pommel horse. He won a gold medal in pommel horse and a bronze medal in the horizontal bars at the 1987 World Artistic Gymnastics Championships in Rotterdam.

== Sports executive ==
Borkai became a member of the Hungarian Olympic Committee (MOB) in May 1989. He was elected to its Athletic Committee in September 1989. He was elected to the presidium of the Hungarian Gymnastics Federation in 1996. He became vice-chair of the West Transdanubian Regional Youth Council in 1999. He served as Chairperson of the Sport Committee of Győr-Moson-Sopron County from 1999 to 2002. He was elected one of the vice-presidents of the MOB in 2009. He also served as social president of Győri Audi ETO KC until May 2011.

Borkai served as President of the Hungarian Olympic Committee from 20 November 2010 to 2 May 2017, replacing Pál Schmitt. In June 2015, Budapest decided to bid for the 2024 Summer Olympics. The MOB has unanimously voted in support of the Olympic bid. Borkai argued the MOB established a professional body to examine Hungary's chances of submitting an Olympic bid after the IOC adopted the Olympic Agenda 2020. After political disagreements, however, Budapest withdrew its bid in March 2017.

Due to its relatively poor result at the 2016 Summer Olympics, the government of Viktor Orbán amended the Sports Act in November 2016, reorganizing the sports management in Hungary. Under this, the MOB lost its influence, fund distribution role, the coordination of the sports school program, the training of the youth, and the education of the sports experts, which were taken by the Secretary of Sports within the Ministry of Human Resources. There were critics from the government that Borkai performed his tasks through voluntary work beside the primary of mayor of Győr. Borkai was replaced as president by Krisztián Kulcsár on 2 May 2017. Due to his huge sex and corruption scandal (see below), he was expelled from the Hungarian Olympic Committee on 21 October 2019.

== Political career ==
With the rank of lieutenant-colonel, Borkai was headmaster of Béri Balogh Ádám Military Secondary School and College from 1999 to 2006 (he was already a teacher there since 1992). He entered the 2006 Hungarian local elections as the candidate of Fidesz for the mayor of Győr where he gained victory and then re-elected in 2010, 2014, and 2019. Borkai was also a Member of Parliament for Győr (Constituency III, Győr-Moson-Sopron County) between 2010 and 2014. He worked in the Defense and Law Enforcement Committee.

In August 2010, the newly formed Fidesz government, led by Viktor Orbán, amended the Constitution. It ruled that members of law enforcement or armed forces may not engage in political activity or membership and forbade them from running as candidates in elections for 3 years after having terminated service. The original proposal suggested a 5-year interval. As Zsolt Borkai, then also a lieutenant-colonel of the Hungarian Defence Forces, would also fall under this category, the government reduced it to three years. Therefore, critics and opposition parties called the amendment "lex Borkai". As a result, Borkai could run as a mayoral candidate in the Autumn 2010 Hungarian local elections. Borkai said he was not sure that the text of the constitutional amendment had been rewritten for him, but if so, he considered it an honor.

=== Controversy ===
Shortly before the 2019 Hungarian local elections, he became a subject of controversy because an anonymous blogger released a video in which Borkai is seen having an extramarital affair with a young woman on a yacht with numerous others, which showed hints at drug use supposedly somewhere on the Adriatic Sea. Subsequently, other posts released on the same blog alleged that this type of orgy and cocaine use was a common routine for Borkai, and furthermore, he was linked to a widespread corruption scandal as well on the blog. In response to these issues, Borkai acknowledged that he was present at the event seen on the disclosed materials and apologized for his behavior, but denied the accusations of corruption and drug use.

Despite his reelection by a narrow margin of only 641 votes during the 2019 Hungarian local elections, the incident may have negatively impacted the election results of Fidesz nationwide. Two days after his re-election, he announced that he had left Fidesz and that from then on he wanted to carry on his job as independent mayor of Győr. However, less than a month after his re-election, Borkai announced his resignation even as mayor in an open letter to the people of Győr on 6 November 2019, effective on 8 November after the inaugural meeting of the city's General Assembly.

At the 2024 Hungarian local elections, he attempted to return to politics and ran for mayor again, as leader of his party Együtt a Jövőnkért Borkaival ("Together with Borkai for Our Future"). This resulted in him splitting the conservative, pro-Fidesz voters between him and incumbent mayor András Dézsi, which led to a liberal candidate winning the election in a city of mostly conservative voters. Borkai received 27,02% of the votes, and he came in third place behind Bence Pintér (31,15%) and András Dézsi (30,39%).

== Personal life ==
Borkai has been married since 1989; his wife is an educator, Myrtill Havassy. They have two children, Petra (born 1992) and Ádám (born 1995).

Political offices
Preceded by József Balogh	Mayor of Győr; 2006–2019	Succeeded by Csaba András Dézsi
Sporting positions
Preceded by Pál Schmitt	President of the Hungarian Olympic Committee; 2010–2017	Succeeded by Krisztián Kulcsár
