= 1989 European Men's Artistic Gymnastics Championships =

18th European Men's Artistic Gymnastics Championships
- Location: Stockholm, Sweden
- Start date: 6 May 1989
- End date: 7 May 1989

The 18th European Artistic Gymnastics Championships for men took place in Stockholm, Sweden in 1989.

== Medalists ==
| Event | Gold | Silver | Bronze |
|---|---|---|---|
| All-around | (Soviet Union) Igor Korobchinsky | (Soviet Union) Valentin Mogilny | (East Germany) Holger Behrendt |
| Floor | (Soviet Union) Igor Korobchinsky | (Romania) Cristian Brezeanu | (East Germany) Holger Behrendt |
| Pommel horse | (Soviet Union) Valentin Mogilny | (East Germany) Andreas Wecker | (Bulgaria) Kalofer Khristozov |
| Rings | (East Germany) Holger Behrendt | (Soviet Union) Vitaly Marinich | (West Germany) Andreas Aguilar |
| Vault | (Soviet Union) Valentin Mogilny | (Hungary) Gyula Takács | (Romania) Marius Gherman |
| Parallel bars | (Bulgaria) Kalofer Khristozov | (East Germany) Andreas Wecker | (Soviet Union) Valentin Mogilny |
| Horizontal bar | (East Germany) Andreas Wecker | (Soviet Union) Vitaly Marinich (Romania) Nicusor Pascu | Not awarded |

=== Medal table ===
| Rank | Nation | Gold | Silver | Bronze | Total |
|---|---|---|---|---|---|
| 1 | Soviet Union (URS) | 4 | 3 | 1 | 8 |
| 2 | East Germany (GDR) | 2 | 2 | 2 | 6 |
| 3 | Bulgaria (BUL) | 1 | 0 | 1 | 2 |
| 4 | Romania (ROM) | 0 | 2 | 1 | 3 |
| 5 | Hungary (HUN) | 0 | 1 | 0 | 1 |
| 6 | West Germany (FRG) | 0 | 0 | 1 | 1 |
| Totals (6 entries) | | 7 | 8 | 6 | 21 |

== Results ==
=== All Around ===
All competitors took part in the all-around with no prior qualification. Here are the top 10 finishes.

| Rank | Athlete | Nation | Apparatus | | | | | | Total |
| Rank | Athlete | Nation | F | PH | R | V | PB | HB | Total |
|---|---|---|---|---|---|---|---|---|---|
| 1st place, gold medalist(s) | Igor Korobchinsky | Soviet Union (URS) | 9.600 | 9.650 | 9.600 | 9.900 | 9.650 | 9.700 | 58.100 |
| 2nd place, silver medalist(s) | Valentin Mogilny | Soviet Union (URS) | 9.350 | 9.750 | 9.650 | 9.650 | 9.850 | 9.800 | 58.050 |
| 3rd place, bronze medalist(s) | Holger Behrendt | East Germany (GDR) | 9.500 | 9.500 | 9.750 | 9.650 | 9.850 | 9.600 | 57.850 |
| 4 | Johan Jonasson | Sweden (SWE) | 9.450 | 9.550 | 9.650 | 9.700 | 9.650 | 9.800 | 57.800 |
| 5 | Vitaly Marinich | Soviet Union (URS) | 9.500 | 9.650 | 9.550 | 9.650 | 9.600 | 9.750 | 57.700 |
| 6 | Nicusor Pascu | Romania (ROM) | 9.400 | 9.400 | 9.500 | 9.600 | 9.700 | 9.650 | 57.250 |
| 7 | Kalofer Khristozov | Bulgaria (BUL) | 9.250 | 9.650 | 9.600 | 9.500 | 9.700 | 9.450 | 57.150 |
| 7 | Jury Chechi | Italy (ITA) | 9.600 | 9.300 | 9.650 | 9.600 | 9.500 | 9.500 | 57.150 |
| 7 | Andreas Wecker | East Germany (GDR) | 8.750 | 9.700 | 9.600 | 9.600 | 9.700 | 9.800 | 57.150 |
| 10 | Marius Gherman | Romania (ROM) | 9.500 | 9.250 | 9.400 | 9.800 | 9.400 | 9.600 | 56.950 |

=== Floor ===
| Rank | Gymnast | Total |
|---|---|---|
| 1st place, gold medalist(s) | (Soviet Union) Igor Korobchinsky | 9.750 |
| 2nd place, silver medalist(s) | (Romania) Cristian Brezeanu | 9.725 |
| 3rd place, bronze medalist(s) | (East Germany) Holger Behrendt | 9.687 |
| 4 | (Romania) Marius Gherman | 9.650 |
| 5 | (Sweden) Oerjan Dahl | 9.637 |
| 6 | (Hungary) Gyula Takács | 9.625 |
| 7 | (Soviet Union) Vitaly Marinich | 9.612 |
| 8 | (Italy) Jury Chechi | 9.575 |

=== Pommel horse ===
| Rank | Gymnast | Total |
|---|---|---|
| 1st place, gold medalist(s) | (Soviet Union) Valentin Mogilny | 9.837 |
| 2nd place, silver medalist(s) | (East Germany) Andreas Wecker | 9.737 |
| 3rd place, bronze medalist(s) | (Bulgaria) Kalofer Hristozov | 9.700 |
| 4 | (Soviet Union) Igor Korobchinsky | 9.687 |
| 4 | (Sweden) Johan Jonasson | 9.687 |
| 6 | (France) Stéphane Cauterman | 9.650 |
| 7 | (Italy) Gianmatteo Centazzo | 9.600 |
| 8 | (Bulgaria) Lubomir Geraskov | 8.625 |

=== Rings ===
| Rank | Gymnast | Total |
|---|---|---|
| 1st place, gold medalist(s) | (East Germany) Holger Behrendt | 9.850 |
| 2nd place, silver medalist(s) | (Soviet Union) Vitaly Marinich | 9.812 |
| 3rd place, bronze medalist(s) | (West Germany) Andreas Aguilar | 9.800 |
| 4 | (Italy) Jury Chechi | 9.787 |
| 5 | (Bulgaria) Kalofer Khristozov | 9.762 |
| 5 | (Soviet Union) Valentin Mogilny | 9.762 |
| 5 | (Sweden) Johan Jonasson | 9.762 |
| 8 | (East Germany) Andreas Wecker | 9.550 |

=== Vault ===
| Rank | Gymnast | Total |
|---|---|---|
| 1st place, gold medalist(s) | (Soviet Union) Valentin Mogilny | 9.793 |
| 2nd place, silver medalist(s) | (Hungary) Gyula Takács | 9.750 |
| 3rd place, bronze medalist(s) | (Romania) Marius Gherman | 9.712 |
| 4 | (United Kingdom) James May | 9.649 |
| 5 | (Sweden) Johan Jonasson | 9.462 |
| 6 | (East Germany) Holger Behrendt | 9.443 |
| 7 | (Soviet Union) Igor Korobchinsky | 9.437 |
| 8 | (Romania) Nicusor Pascu | 9.425 |

=== Parallel bars ===
| Rank | Gymnast | Total |
|---|---|---|
| 1st place, gold medalist(s) | (Bulgaria) Kalofer Hristozov | 9.837 |
| 2nd place, silver medalist(s) | (East Germany) Andreas Wecker | 9.775 |
| 3rd place, bronze medalist(s) | (Soviet Union) Valentin Mogilny | 9.762 |
| 4 | (East Germany) Holger Behrendt | 9.750 |
| 5 | (Soviet Union) Vitaly Marinich | 9.737 |
| 6 | (Bulgaria) Deyan Kolev | 9.650 |
| 7 | (Sweden) Johan Jonasson | 9.587 |
| 8 | (Romania) Nicusor Pascu | 9.487 |

=== Horizontal bar ===
| Rank | Gymnast | Total |
|---|---|---|
| 1st place, gold medalist(s) | (East Germany) Andreas Wecker | 9.862 |
| 2nd place, silver medalist(s) | (Soviet Union) Vitaly Marinich | 9.850 |
| 2nd place, silver medalist(s) | (Romania) Nicusor Pascu | 9.850 |
| 4 | (East Germany) Holger Behrendt | 9.800 |
| 4 | (Hungary) Csaba Fajkusz | 9.800 |
| 4 | (Sweden) Johan Jonasson | 9.800 |
| 7 | (Soviet Union) Valentin Mogilny | 9.775 |
| 8 | (Spain) Miguel Rubio | 9.650 |

== See also ==
- 1989 European Women's Artistic Gymnastics Championships
