= Martina Jentsch =

East German gymnast

Olympic medal record

Women's gymnastics

Representing East Germany

Olympics
Bronze medal – third place	1988 Seoul	Team

World Championships
Bronze medal – third place	1985 Montreal	Team
Bronze medal – third place	1987 Rotterdam	Team

Martina Jentsch (born 22 March 1968 in Leipzig) is a former East German gymnast who competed in the 1988 Summer Olympics.

== Career ==
At the 1985 East German National Championships, Jentsch placed 5th on vault. Jentsch attended the 1985 World Artistic Gymnastics Championships in Montreal, Canada, where she helped the East German team win a bronze medal. In 1986, Jentsch won the bronze medal in the all-around at the 1986 East German National Championships as well as gold medals on vault and floor exercise. At the same competition, she was placed 4th on uneven bars and 5th on balance beam. At the 1987 European Championships, she was placed 7th in the all-around, 8th on balance beam and 6th on floor exercise. Jentsch was a member of the bronze medal-winning team at the 1987 World Artistic Gymnastics Championships in Rotterdam, Netherlands. Individually, she was placed 7th in the all-around final, 8th in the vault final, 7th in the uneven bars final and 7th in the floor exercise final. In 1988, Jentsch and the East German team won the bronze medal in the team competition at the Seoul Summer Olympics though, individually, she was too injured to compete in the optionals part of the competition.

== Eponymous skills ==
Jentsch has two eponymous skills listed in the Code of Points.

Apparatus	Name	Description	Difficulty (Note: Valid for the 2025–2028 Code of Points)
Uneven bars	Jentsch	Round-off in front of low bar - tucked salto backward over low bar to hang on low bar	D (0.4)
Floor exercise	Andreasen-Jentsch	Arabian double salto tucked	E (0.5)
