= Aurelia Dobre =

Romanian artistic gymnast

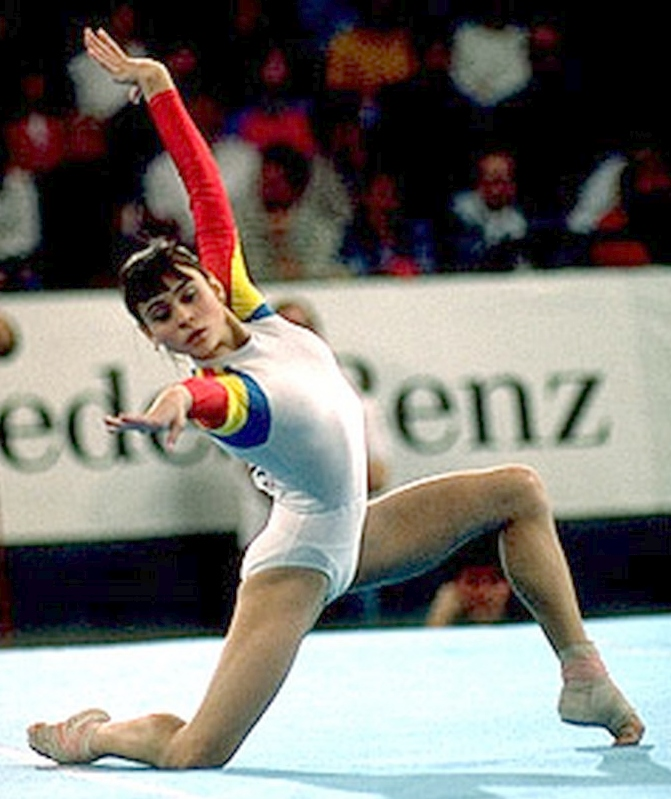
- Dobre in 1988

Personal information
- Full name: Aurelia Dobre
- Nickname: Aurie
- Born: 16 November 1972 (age 53) Bucharest, Romania
- Height: 1.60 m (5 ft 3 in)
- Spouse: Boz Mofid (m. 1992)

Gymnastics career
- Discipline: Women's artistic gymnastics
- Country represented: Romania
- Gym: Deva National Training Center
- Head coach: Adrian Goreac
- Retired: 1989
Medal record
Olympic Games
Silver medal – second place	1988 Seoul	Team
World Championships
Gold medal – first place	1987 Rotterdam	Team
Gold medal – first place	1987 Rotterdam	All-Around
Gold medal – first place	1987 Rotterdam	Balance Beam
Silver medal – second place	1989 Stuttgart	Team
Bronze medal – third place	1987 Rotterdam	Vault
Bronze medal – third place	1987 Rotterdam	Floor Exercise

Aurelia Dobre (born 16 November 1972) is a former artistic gymnast and the 1987 world all-around champion. She is the 1987 world champion in the all-around and on the balance beam and the bronze medalist on the vault and floor exercise; she scored five perfect 10s at these championships. She was also a member of the silver medal-winning Romanian teams at the 1988 Summer Olympics and the 1989 World Artistic Gymnastics Championships.

For years, Dobre was thought to be the youngest world all-around champion ever, having won her title at the age of 14 years and 352 days, until it was found that Olga Bicherova's age had been falsified at the 1981 World Championships, and that Bicherova had been 13 when she won her title.

== Career ==
Dobre began gymnastics at 5 years old. She was initially scared of the balance beam, but she soon returned to the gym and began training. In 1982, she won the junior national championships.

She moved to Deva, Romania to train with the national team in 1984. She was selected for the 1986 Junior European Champinoships, where she won bronze in the all-around after a mistake on her floor exercise. In the event finals, she won gold on vault and uneven bars and silver on the balance beam. Afterward, she broke her knee in training, which she said was the result of training too much.

She recovered in time to compete at the 1987 World Championships, where she won the all-around - the first Romanian to do so. She won two more golds in the team competition and the balance beam final.

Dobre required knee surgery the next year and was unable to train for three months. She placed 6th in the all-around at the 1988 Summer Olympics and won silver with her teammates. The next year, she competed at the 1989 World Championships and won another silver in the team event; individually, she placed 36th in qualifications and did not advance to the all-around final.

== Post-retirement ==
She received an award at the Romanian Gymnastics Federation's 100-year anniversary celebration and was formally recognised as one of the Romanian gymnasts to have scored a perfect 10. In May 2016, she was inducted into the International Gymnastics Hall of Fame.

In 1991, Dobre moved to the United States and in 1992 married Iranian gymnastics coach Boz Mofid. They have four sons who are YouTube personalities: Cyrus, Darius, and twins Lucas and Marcus. Dobre was a choreographer and dance coach at the Dobre Gymnastics Academy in Maryland until 2020, when she decided to retire and close the gym.

== Competition History ==
Year	Event	AA	Team	VT	UB	BB	FX
Junior
1982	Bucharest v. Moscow	1st place, gold medalist(s)	3rd place, bronze medalist(s)				
1983	City of Popes Junior International		8				
1983	Dynamo Spartakiade			1st place, gold medalist(s)			1st place, gold medalist(s)
1983	Junior Balkan Championships	1st place, gold medalist(s)	2nd place, silver medalist(s)				
1983	Junior ROM-GDR Dual Meet	1st place, gold medalist(s)	1st place, gold medalist(s)				
1983	ROM Championships (Category II)		3rd place, bronze medalist(s)				
1984	Druzhba	2nd place, silver medalist(s)					6
1984	Moscow News		4		5		7
1984	Riga International		4		7	5	5
1984	Avignon International		4				
1984	Junior Romanian Championships				3rd place, bronze medalist(s)	2nd place, silver medalist(s)	
1984	Romanian Cup				1st place, gold medalist(s)		1st place, gold medalist(s)
1985	Druzhba	2nd place, silver medalist(s)	11			3rd place, bronze medalist(s)	
1985	Junior Balkan Championships	1st place, gold medalist(s)	1st place, gold medalist(s)				
1985	Avignon International		2nd place, silver medalist(s)				
1985	International Junior Championships		3rd place, bronze medalist(s)	3rd place, bronze medalist(s)	2nd place, silver medalist(s)	1st place, gold medalist(s)	
Senior
1986	Avignon International		1st place, gold medalist(s)			1st place, gold medalist(s)	1st place, gold medalist(s)
1986	Junior European Championships		3rd place, bronze medalist(s)	1st place, gold medalist(s)	1st place, gold medalist(s)	2nd place, silver medalist(s)	
1986	Junior FRA-ROM Dual Meet	1st place, gold medalist(s)	1st place, gold medalist(s)	2nd place, silver medalist(s)		2nd place, silver medalist(s)	1st place, gold medalist(s)
1986	Romanian Championships		2nd place, silver medalist(s)	1st place, gold medalist(s)	3rd place, bronze medalist(s)		3rd place, bronze medalist(s)
1986	ROM-CSSR Dual Meet	1st place, gold medalist(s)	2nd place, silver medalist(s)				
1987	Dynamo Spartakiade		1st place, gold medalist(s)	1st place, gold medalist(s)	1st place, gold medalist(s)	1st place, gold medalist(s)	1st place, gold medalist(s)
1987	Romanian Championships		2nd place, silver medalist(s)				
1987	World Championships	1st place, gold medalist(s)	1st place, gold medalist(s)	3rd place, bronze medalist(s)	4	1st place, gold medalist(s)	3rd place, bronze medalist(s)
1987	Chunichi Cup		6	4	4		8
1987	Tokyo Cup			2nd place, silver medalist(s)		2nd place, silver medalist(s)	
1988	DTB Cup		6	6		6	6
1988	Olympic Games	6	2nd place, silver medalist(s)		7		
1988	Chunichi Cup		6	4	4		8
1988	Tokyo Cup			2nd place, silver medalist(s)		2nd place, silver medalist(s)	
1989	Rome Grand Prix		3rd place, bronze medalist(s)		1st place, gold medalist(s)		
1989	World Championships		2nd place, silver medalist(s)				
1991	World Professional Championships						7
