= Holger Behrendt =

German gymnast and Olympic champion (born 1964)

- Born: 29 January 1964 (age 62) Schönebeck, Bezirk Magdeburg, East Germany

Gymnastics career
- Discipline: Men's artistic gymnastics
- Country represented: East Germany
Medal record
Olympic Games
| Gold medal – first place | 1988 Seoul | Rings |
| Silver medal – second place | 1988 Seoul | Team |
| Bronze medal – third place | 1988 Seoul | Horizontal bar |
World Championships
| Bronze medal – third place | 1985 Montreal | Team |
| Bronze medal – third place | 1987 Rotterdam | Horizontal bar |
| Bronze medal – third place | 1987 Rotterdam | Team |
European Championships
| Gold medal – first place | 1989 Stockholm | Rings |
| Silver medal – second place | 1987 Moscow | Parallel bars |
| Bronze medal – third place | 1987 Moscow | Vault |
| Bronze medal – third place | 1989 Stockholm | All-around |
| Bronze medal – third place | 1989 Stockholm | Floor exercise |

Holger Behrendt (born 29 January 1964 in Schönebeck, Bezirk Magdeburg) is a German gymnast and Olympic champion.

== Gymnastics career ==
=== Olympics ===
Holger Behrendt competed for East Germany at the 1988 Summer Olympics in Seoul where he received a gold medal in rings, a silver medal in team combined exercises, and a bronze medal in horizontal bar.

=== World Championships ===
Behrend participated on the team that received bronze for East Germany at the 1985 World Artistic Gymnastics Championships in Montreal.

At the 1987 World Artistic Gymnastics Championships in Rotterdam, he received a bronze medal in horizontal bar, and again a bronze medal with the team from East Germany.
