= Marius Gherman =

Romanian artistic gymnast

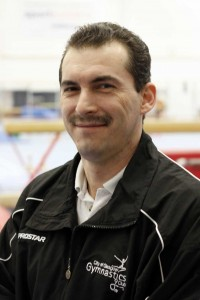
- Gherman in 2009

Personal information
- Full name: Marius Costel Gherman
- Born: 14 July 1967 (age 59) Sibiu, Romania
- Height: 170 cm (5 ft 7 in)

Gymnastics career
- Discipline: Men's artistic gymnastics
- Country represented: Romania
- Head coach: Dănuț Grecu
- Assistant coaches: Ioan Albu, Stefan Hargalas, Virgil Achim
- Former coaches: Horst Stolz, Adrian Stan
Medal record
Olympic Games
Bronze medal – third place	1988 Seoul	Horizontal bar
World Championships
Silver medal – second place	1993 Birmingham	Horizontal bar
European Championships
Bronze medal – third place	1985 Oslo	Horizontal bar
Bronze medal – third place	1989 Stockholm	Vault

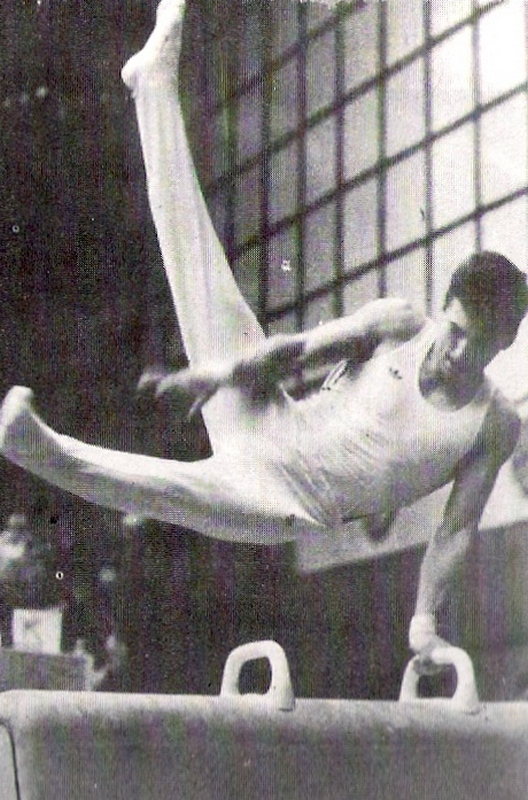
Marius Gherman in 1988

Marius Costel Gherman (born 14 July 1967) is a Romanian artistic gymnast who represented Romania at the 1988 Olympic Games and at the 1992 Olympic Games. His best event was the horizontal bar for which he medaled bronze at the 1988 Olympic Games and silver at the 1993 World Championships. He is also a bronze continental medalist on vault and on horizontal bar.

After retiring from competitions Gherman worked in United Kingdom as a gymnastics coach.
