= Vladimir Artemov =

Russian gymnast (born 1964)

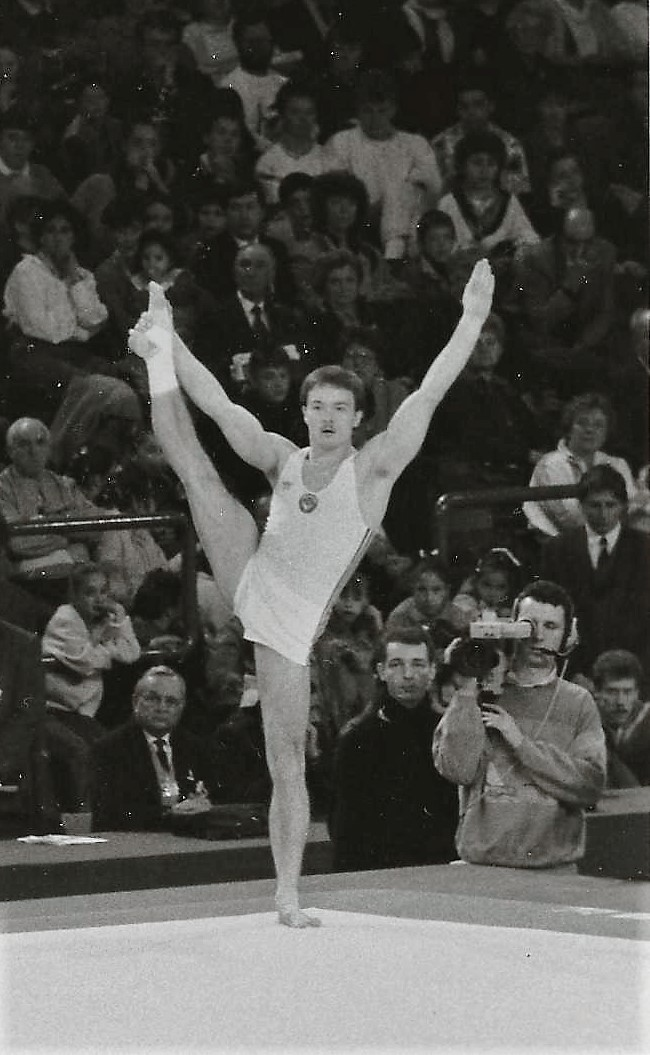

Personal information
- Born: 7 December 1964 (age 61) Vladimir, Russian SFSR, Soviet Union
- Height: 1.67 m (5 ft 5 1/2 in)

Gymnastics career
- Discipline: Men's artistic gymnastics
- Country represented: Soviet Union
Medal record
Olympic Games
Gold medal – first place	1988 Seoul	All-around
Gold medal – first place	1988 Seoul	Parallel bars
Gold medal – first place	1988 Seoul	Horizontal bar
Gold medal – first place	1988 Seoul	Team
Silver medal – second place	1988 Seoul	Floor exercise
World Championships
Gold medal – first place	1983 Budapest	Parallel bars
Gold medal – first place	1985 Montreal	Team
Gold medal – first place	1987 Rotterdam	Team
Gold medal – first place	1987 Rotterdam	Parallel bars
Gold medal – first place	1989 Stuttgart	Team
Gold medal – first place	1989 Stuttgart	Parallel bars
Silver medal – second place	1983 Budapest	Team
Silver medal – second place	1985 Montreal	All-around
Silver medal – second place	1987 Rotterdam	Floor exercise
Silver medal – second place	1989 Stuttgart	Floor exercise
Silver medal – second place	1989 Stuttgart	Horizontal bar
Bronze medal – third place	1987 Rotterdam	All-around
Bronze medal – third place	1989 Stuttgart	Vault

Vladimir Nikolaevich Artemov (Russian: Владимир Николаевич Артемов, born 7 December 1964) is a former Russian artistic gymnast, Olympic champion and world champion who competed for the Soviet Union. He is considered to be one of the greatest parallel bars workers of all time.

He was born in Vladimir.

Artemov competed at the 1988 Summer Olympics in Seoul where he received gold medals in horizontal bar, parallel bars, all-around individual and team combined exercises.

== World championships ==
Artemov won a gold medal in parallel bars at the 1983 World Artistic Gymnastics Championships in Budapest, and again at the 1987 World Artistic Gymnastics Championships in Rotterdam. He has received five silver medals and two bronze medals at the World Gymnastics Championships. He participated on the Soviet teams which won the team final in 1985, 1987 and 1989, and finished second in 1983.

== Awards ==
Artemov was listed among the USSR top ten athletes of the year in 1988.

== After the Olympics ==
Artemov immigrated to the United States from the failing Soviet Union in 1990, settling in Pennsylvania. However, he has mistakenly been identified as the father of former US gymnast Alexander (Sasha) Artemev. The two men are not related. Artemov currently lives in San Antonio, Texas, where he runs a gym with his wife Natalia.

== See also ==
- List of multiple Olympic gold medalists at a single Games
