= Kim Eun-mi (gymnast) =

South Korean gymnast

Personal information
- Nationality: South Korean
- Born: 7 September 1972 (age 52)

Sport
- Sport: Gymnastics

Kim Eun-mi (born 7 September 1972) is a South Korean gymnast. She competed in six events at the 1988 Summer Olympics.
