= Gymnastics at the 1980 Summer Olympics – Men's parallel bars =

Olympic gymnastics event

Men's parallel bars at the Games of the XXII Olympiad
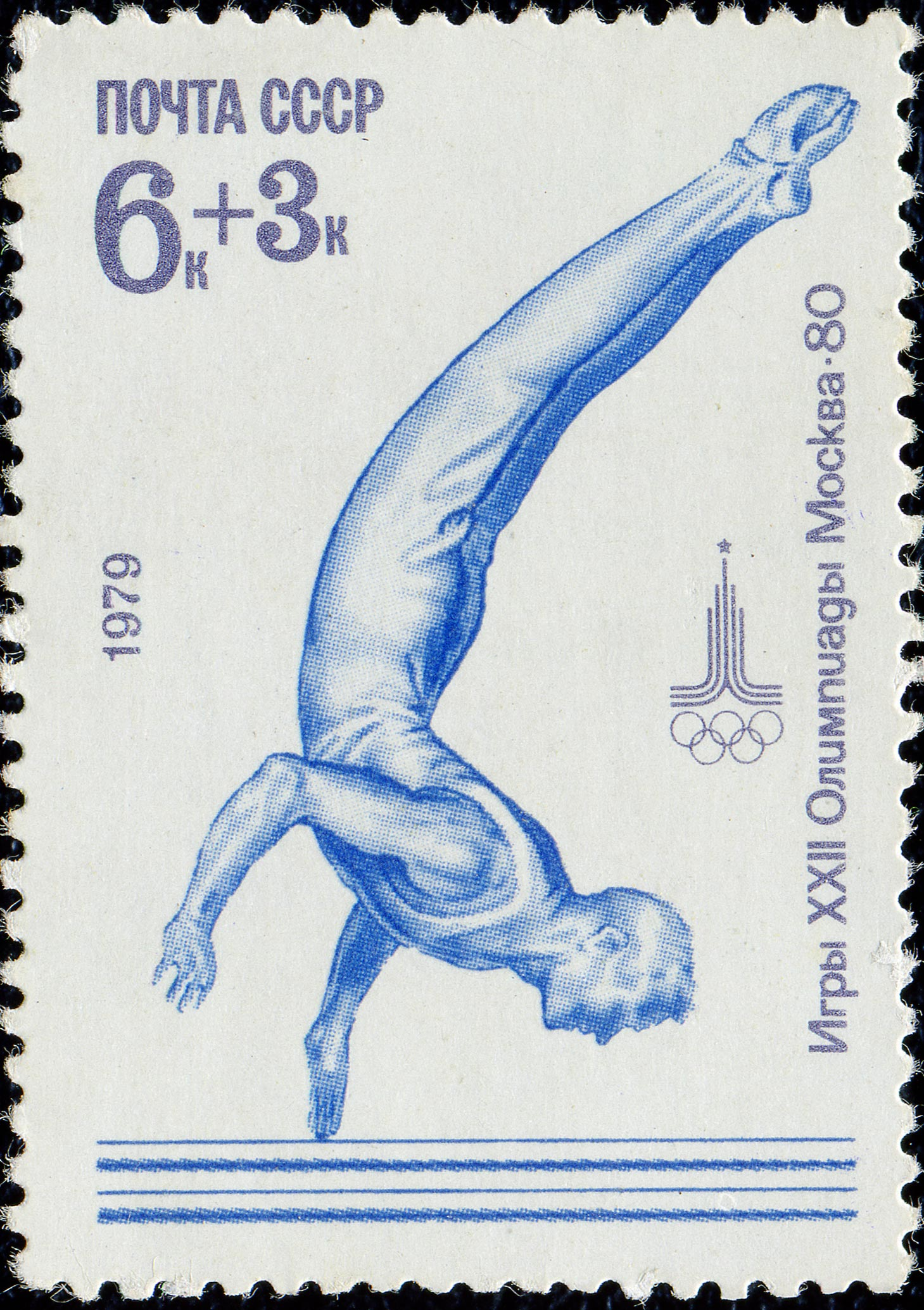
- Soviet stamp commemorating 1980 Olympics, depicting parallel bars
- Venue: Luzhniki Palace of Sports
- Dates: 20–25 July 1980
- Competitors: 65 from 14 nations
- Winning score: 19.775

Medalists
1st place, gold medalist(s)		Aleksandr Tkachyov; Soviet Union
2nd place, silver medalist(s)		Alexander Dityatin; Soviet Union
3rd place, bronze medalist(s)		Roland Brückner; East Germany

The men's parallel bars competition was one of eight events for male competitors in artistic gymnastics at the 1980 Summer Olympics in Moscow. The qualification and final rounds took place on July 20, 22 and 25th at the Luzhniki Palace of Sports. There were 65 competitors from 14 nations, with nations competing in the team event having 6 gymnasts while other nations could have to up to 3 gymnasts. The event was won by Aleksandr Tkachyov of the Soviet Union, the nation's first victory in the parallel bars since 1960 and third overall, tying Switzerland for second-most all-time behind Japan's four. Fellow Soviet Alexander Dityatin took silver, while Roland Brückner earned East Germany's first medal in the event (and first medal for any German gymnast in the parallel bars since 1936). Japan's four-Games gold medal streak in the event ended with no Japanese gymnasts competing due to the American-led boycott.

== Background ==
This was the 15th appearance of the event, which is one of the five apparatus events held every time there were apparatus events at the Summer Olympics (no apparatus events were held in 1900, 1908, 1912, or 1920). Two of the six finalists from 1976 returned: silver medalist Nikolai Andrianov of the Soviet Union and sixth-place finisher Andrzej Szajna of Poland. The two most recent world champions, Eizo Kenmotsu of Japan (1978) and Bart Conner of the United States (1979), did not compete in Moscow due to the boycott. Andrianov had shared silver at the 1978 world championships and Aleksandr Tkachyov, also of the Soviet Union, had shared silver in 1979.

Brazil made its debut in the men's parallel bars. Hungary made its 13th appearance, tying the United States (absent from the parallel bars event for the first time since the inaugural 1896 Games) for most of any nation.

== Competition format ==
Each nation entered a team of six gymnasts or up to three individual gymnasts. All entrants in the gymnastics competitions performed both a compulsory exercise and a voluntary exercise for each apparatus. The scores for all 12 exercises were summed to give an individual all-around score. These exercise scores were also used for qualification for the apparatus finals. The two exercises (compulsory and voluntary) for each apparatus were summed to give an apparatus score. The top 6 in each apparatus participated in the finals, except that nations were limited to two finalists each; others were ranked 7th through 65th. Half of the preliminary score carried over to the final.

== Schedule ==
All times are Moscow Time (UTC+3)

Date	Time	Round
Sunday, 20 July 1980	10:00; 17:00	Preliminary: Compulsory
Tuesday, 22 July 1980	10:00; 17:00	Preliminary: Voluntary
Friday, 25 July 1980	14:30	Final

== Results ==
Sixty-five gymnasts competed in the compulsory and optional rounds on July 20 and 22. The six highest scoring gymnasts advanced to the final on July 25. Each country was limited to two competitors in the final. Half of the points earned by each gymnast during both the compulsory and optional rounds carried over to the final. This constitutes the "prelim" score.

Rank	Gymnast	Nation	Preliminary			Final		
Rank	Gymnast	Nation	Compulsory	Voluntary	Total	1/2 Prelim.	Final	Total
1st place, gold medalist(s)	Aleksandr Tkachyov	Soviet Union	9.85	9.90	19.75	9.875	9.900	19.775
2nd place, silver medalist(s)	Alexander Dityatin	Soviet Union	9.80	9.90	19.70	9.850	9.900	19.750
3rd place, bronze medalist(s)	Roland Brückner	East Germany	9.70	9.90	19.60	9.800	9.850	19.650
4	Michael Nikolay	East Germany	9.60	9.80	19.40	9.700	9.900	19.600
5	Stoyan Deltchev	Bulgaria	9.85	9.90	19.75	9.875	9.700	19.575
6	Roberto Leon	Cuba	9.70	9.90	19.60	9.800	9.700	19.500
7	Nikolai Andrianov	Soviet Union	9.80	9.90	19.70	Did not advance		
8	Bohdan Makuts	Soviet Union	9.60	9.90	19.50	Did not advance		
9	Dan Grecu	Romania	9.65	9.80	19.45	Did not advance		
10	Eduard Azaryan	Soviet Union	9.65	9.75	19.40	Did not advance		
11	Andreas Bronst	East Germany	9.50	9.80	19.30	Did not advance		
11	Sorin Cepoi	Romania	9.60	9.70	19.30	Did not advance		
11	Ralf-Peter Hemmann	East Germany	9.60	9.70	19.30	Did not advance		
14	Ferenc Donáth	Hungary	9.55	9.65	19.20	Did not advance		
14	Zoltán Magyar	Hungary	9.45	9.75	19.20	Did not advance		
14	Dancho Yordanov	Bulgaria	9.45	9.75	19.20	Did not advance		
17	Aurelian Georgescu	Romania	9.55	9.60	19.15	Did not advance		
18	Jozef Konečný	Czechoslovakia	9.50	9.60	19.10	Did not advance		
18	Lutz Mack	East Germany	9.50	9.60	19.10	Did not advance		
18	Plamen Petkov	Bulgaria	9.40	9.70	19.10	Did not advance		
21	Michel Boutard	France	9.50	9.55	19.05	Did not advance		
21	Miguel Arroyo	Cuba	9.45	9.60	19.05	Did not advance		
21	Jiří Tabák	Czechoslovakia	9.35	9.70	19.05	Did not advance		
24	Mario Castro	Cuba	9.30	9.70	19.00	Did not advance		
24	Cho Hun	North Korea	9.40	9.60	19.00	Did not advance		
24	Han Gwang-song	North Korea	9.50	9.50	19.00	Did not advance		
24	Lutz Hoffmann	East Germany	9.30	9.70	19.00	Did not advance		
28	György Guczoghy	Hungary	9.40	9.55	18.95	Did not advance		
28	Jan Zoulik	Czechoslovakia	9.40	9.55	18.95	Did not advance		
28	Ognyan Bangiev	Bulgaria	9.35	9.60	18.95	Did not advance		
28	Sergio Suarez	Cuba	9.25	9.70	18.95	Did not advance		
32	Kim Gwang-jin	North Korea	9.30	9.60	18.90	Did not advance		
32	Vladimir Markelov	Soviet Union	9.10	9.80	18.90	Did not advance		
32	Nicolae Oprescu	Romania	9.45	9.45	18.90	Did not advance		
32	Rumen Petkov	Bulgaria	9.35	9.55	18.90	Did not advance		
36	Rudolf Babiak	Czechoslovakia	9.40	9.45	18.85	Did not advance		
36	Gabriel Calvo	Spain	9.25	9.60	18.85	Did not advance		
36	Péter Kovács	Hungary	9.00	9.85	18.85	Did not advance		
39	Miloslav Kučeřík	Czechoslovakia	9.40	9.40	18.80	Did not advance		
40	Kang Gwang-song	North Korea	8.95	9.80	18.75	Did not advance		
41	José de la Casa	Spain	9.15	9.55	18.70	Did not advance		
41	Jan Migdau	Czechoslovakia	9.30	9.40	18.70	Did not advance		
43	Fernando Bertrand	Spain	9.25	9.40	18.65	Did not advance		
43	Romulus Bucuroiu	Romania	9.10	9.55	18.65	Did not advance		
43	Joël Suty	France	9.15	9.50	18.65	Did not advance		
43	Kurt Szilier	Romania	9.65	9.00	18.65	Did not advance		
47	Enrique Bravo	Cuba	9.15	9.40	18.55	Did not advance		
47	Lindsay Nylund	Australia	9.30	9.25	18.55	Did not advance		
47	Waldemar Woźniak	Poland	9.15	9.40	18.55	Did not advance		
50	Zoltán Kelemen	Hungary	9.20	9.30	18.50	Did not advance		
50	István Vámos	Hungary	9.35	9.15	18.50	Did not advance		
52	Krzysztof Potaczek	Poland	9.05	9.40	18.45	Did not advance		
53	Li Su-gil	North Korea	8.95	9.45	18.40	Did not advance		
53	Yanko Radanchev	Bulgaria	9.25	9.15	18.40	Did not advance		
55	Willi Moy	France	9.25	9.10	18.35	Did not advance		
55	Barry Winch	Great Britain	9.20	9.15	18.35	Did not advance		
57	Henri Boerio	France	8.55	9.60	18.15	Did not advance		
58	Andrzej Szajna	Poland	8.55	9.55	18.10	Did not advance		
59	Yves Bouquel	France	8.85	8.75	17.60	Did not advance		
60	Keith Langley	Great Britain	9.10	8.40	17.50	Did not advance		
61	Thomas Wilson	Great Britain	8.25	9.15	17.40	Did not advance		
62	Song Sun-bong	North Korea	8.15	9.00	17.15	Did not advance		
63	João Luiz Ribeiro	Brazil	8.20	8.85	17.05	Did not advance		
64	Marc Touchais	France	8.30	8.55	16.85	Did not advance		
65	Jorge Roche	Cuba	9.45	0.00	9.45	Did not advance		
—	Moustapha Chouara	Lebanon	DNS			Did not advance		
—	Adnan Horns	Lebanon	DNS			Did not advance		
—	Maurizio Zonzini	San Marino	DNS			Did not advance		
