= Gymnastics at the 1980 Summer Olympics – Men's rings =

Olympic gymnastics event

Men's rings at the Games of the XXII Olympiad
- Pictogram for Gymnastics
- Venue: Luzhniki Palace of Sports
- Dates: 20–25 July 1980
- Competitors: 65 from 14 nations
- Winning score: 19.650

Medalists
1st place, gold medalist(s)		Alexander Dityatin; Soviet Union
2nd place, silver medalist(s)		Aleksandr Tkachyov; Soviet Union
3rd place, bronze medalist(s)		Jiří Tabák; Czechoslovakia

The men's rings competition was one of eight events for male competitors in artistic gymnastics at the 1980 Summer Olympics in Moscow. The qualification and final rounds took place on July 20, 22 and 25th at the Luzhniki Palace of Sports. There were 65 competitors from 14 nations, with nations competing in the team event having 6 gymnasts while other nations could have to up to 3 gymnasts. The event was won by Alexander Dityatin of the Soviet Union, the nation's fifth victory in the rings, with fellow Soviet Aleksandr Tkachyov taking silver. It was the second consecutive Games that the Soviet Union had the top two men in the rings. Dityatin, the silver medalist in Montreal 1976, was the seventh man to win multiple medals in the rings. Jiří Tabák earned Czechoslovakia's first medal in the event since 1948.

== Background ==
This was the 15th appearance of the event, which is one of the five apparatus events held every time there were apparatus events at the Summer Olympics (no apparatus events were held in 1900, 1908, 1912, or 1920). The top four of the six finalists from 1976 returned: gold medalist Nikolai Andrianov and silver medalist Alexander Dityatin of the Soviet Union, bronze medalist Dan Grecu of Romania, and fourth-place finisher Ferenc Donath of Hungary. There had been two world championships since the 1976 Games; in 1978, Andrianov won, followed by Dityatin and Grecu, while in 1979, Dityatin was the victor with Grecu second and Aleksandr Tkachyov of the Soviet Union third.

Brazil made its debut in the men's rings. Hungary made its 13th appearance, tying the United States (absent from the rings event for the first time since the inaugural 1896 Games) for most of any nation.

== Competition format ==
Each nation entered a team of six gymnasts or up to three individual gymnasts. All entrants in the gymnastics competitions performed both a compulsory exercise and a voluntary exercise for each apparatus. The scores for all 12 exercises were summed to give an individual all-around score. These exercise scores were also used for qualification for the apparatus finals. The two exercises (compulsory and voluntary) for each apparatus were summed to give an apparatus score. The top 6 in each apparatus participated in the finals, except that nations were limited to two finalists each; others were ranked 7th through 65th. Half of the preliminary score carried over to the final.

== Schedule ==
All times are Moscow Time (UTC+3)

Date	Time	Round
Sunday, 20 July 1980	10:00; 17:00	Preliminary: Compulsory
Tuesday, 22 July 1980	10:00; 17:00	Preliminary: Voluntary
Friday, 25 July 1980	14:30	Final

== Results ==
Sixty-five gymnasts competed in the compulsory and optional rounds on July 20 and 22. The six highest scoring gymnasts advanced to the final on July 25. Each country was limited to two competitors in the final. Half of the points earned by each gymnast during both the compulsory and optional rounds carried over to the final. This constitutes the "prelim" score.

Grecu suffered a muscle tear during the competition, which led to his transition from competitor to coach after the Games.

Rank	Gymnast	Nation	Preliminary			Final		
Rank	Gymnast	Nation	Compulsory	Voluntary	Total	1/2 Prelim.	Final	Total
1st place, gold medalist(s)	Alexander Dityatin	Soviet Union	9.90	9.95	19.85	9.925	9.950	19.875
2nd place, silver medalist(s)	Aleksandr Tkachyov	Soviet Union	9.80	9.85	19.65	9.825	9.900	19.725
3rd place, bronze medalist(s)	Jiří Tabák	Czechoslovakia	9.75	9.85	19.60	9.800	9.800	19.600
4	Roland Brückner	East Germany	9.80	9.75	19.55	9.775	9.800	19.575
5	Stoyan Deltchev	Bulgaria	9.65	9.90	19.55	9.775	9.700	19.475
6	Dan Grecu	Romania	9.80	9.90	19.70	9.850	1.000	10.850
7	Nikolai Andrianov	Soviet Union	9.80	9.85	19.65	Did not advance		
8	Eduard Azaryan	Soviet Union	9.75	9.85	19.60	Did not advance		
9	Vladimir Markelov	Soviet Union	9.65	9.85	19.50	Did not advance		
10	Lutz Mack	East Germany	9.75	9.70	19.45	Did not advance		
10	Rudolf Babiak	Czechoslovakia	9.70	9.75	19.45	Did not advance		
12	Kim Gwang-jin	North Korea	9.70	9.70	19.40	Did not advance		
13	Ferenc Donáth	Hungary	9.65	9.70	19.35	Did not advance		
13	Bohdan Makuts	Soviet Union	9.55	9.80	19.35	Did not advance		
13	Michael Nikolay	East Germany	9.65	9.70	19.35	Did not advance		
16	Nicolae Oprescu	Romania	9.60	9.70	19.30	Did not advance		
17	Lutz Hoffmann	East Germany	9.60	9.65	19.25	Did not advance		
17	Jan Zoulik	Czechoslovakia	9.60	9.65	19.25	Did not advance		
19	Kurt Szilier	Romania	9.50	9.70	19.20	Did not advance		
20	Ralf-Peter Hemmann	East Germany	9.50	9.65	19.15	Did not advance		
21	Zoltán Magyar	Hungary	9.60	9.50	19.10	Did not advance		
21	Plamen Petkov	Bulgaria	9.55	9.55	19.10	Did not advance		
23	Dancho Yordanov	Bulgaria	9.40	9.65	19.05	Did not advance		
24	Willi Moy	France	9.35	9.65	19.00	Did not advance		
25	Péter Kovács	Hungary	9.40	9.55	18.95	Did not advance		
25	Aurelian Georgescu	Romania	9.35	9.60	18.95	Did not advance		
27	Zoltán Kelemen	Hungary	9.50	9.40	18.90	Did not advance		
27	Andrzej Szajna	Poland	9.25	9.65	18.90	Did not advance		
29	Romulus Bucuroiu	Romania	9.20	9.65	18.85	Did not advance		
30	Sorin Cepoi	Romania	9.40	9.40	18.80	Did not advance		
30	Jan Migdau	Czechoslovakia	9.40	9.40	18.80	Did not advance		
32	Andreas Bronst	East Germany	9.35	9.40	18.75	Did not advance		
33	Cho Hun	North Korea	9.35	9.35	18.70	Did not advance		
34	György Guczoghy	Hungary	9.30	9.35	18.65	Did not advance		
34	Miloslav Kučeřík	Czechoslovakia	9.30	9.35	18.65	Did not advance		
34	Rumen Petkov	Bulgaria	9.35	9.30	18.65	Did not advance		
37	Jozef Konečný	Czechoslovakia	9.50	9.05	18.55	Did not advance		
37	István Vámos	Hungary	9.15	9.40	18.55	Did not advance		
39	Miguel Arroyo	Cuba	9.20	9.30	18.50	Did not advance		
39	Ognyan Bangiev	Bulgaria	9.20	9.30	18.50	Did not advance		
41	Mario Castro	Cuba	9.45	9.00	18.45	Did not advance		
42	Yanko Radanchev	Bulgaria	9.10	9.30	18.40	Did not advance		
42	Jorge Roche	Cuba	9.50	8.90	18.40	Did not advance		
44	Henri Boerio	France	9.10	9.25	18.35	Did not advance		
44	Han Gwang-song	North Korea	9.45	8.90	18.35	Did not advance		
44	Sergio Suarez	Cuba	9.20	9.15	18.35	Did not advance		
47	Michel Boutard	France	9.30	9.00	18.30	Did not advance		
47	Li Su-gil	North Korea	9.20	9.10	18.30	Did not advance		
47	Waldemar Woźniak	Poland	9.20	9.10	18.30	Did not advance		
50	Gabriel Calvo	Spain	9.05	9.20	18.25	Did not advance		
50	Roberto Leon	Cuba	9.25	9.00	18.25	Did not advance		
50	Song Sun-bong	North Korea	9.05	9.20	18.25	Did not advance		
53	Barry Winch	Great Britain	8.95	9.20	18.15	Did not advance		
54	Keith Langley	Great Britain	8.80	9.30	18.10	Did not advance		
55	Kang Gwang-song	North Korea	9.45	8.60	18.05	Did not advance		
56	Thomas Wilson	Great Britain	8.80	9.20	18.00	Did not advance		
57	Marc Touchais	France	8.75	9.20	17.95	Did not advance		
58	Enrique Bravo	Cuba	9.00	8.90	17.90	Did not advance		
59	Yves Bouquel	France	8.70	9.15	17.85	Did not advance		
60	Lindsay Nylund	Australia	8.50	9.10	17.60	Did not advance		
61	Fernando Bertrand	Spain	9.00	8.45	17.45	Did not advance		
61	José de la Casa	Spain	9.00	8.45	17.45	Did not advance		
63	João Luiz Ribeiro	Brazil	8.55	8.80	17.35	Did not advance		
64	Joël Suty	France	8.60	8.70	17.30	Did not advance		
65	Krzysztof Potaczek	Poland	8.75	8.05	16.80	Did not advance		
—	Moustapha Chouara	Lebanon	DNS			Did not advance		
—	Adnan Horns	Lebanon	DNS			Did not advance		
—	Maurizio Zonzini	San Marino	DNS			Did not advance		
