= Gymnastics at the 1980 Summer Olympics – Men's vault =

Olympic gymnastics event

Men's vault at the Games of the XXII Olympiad
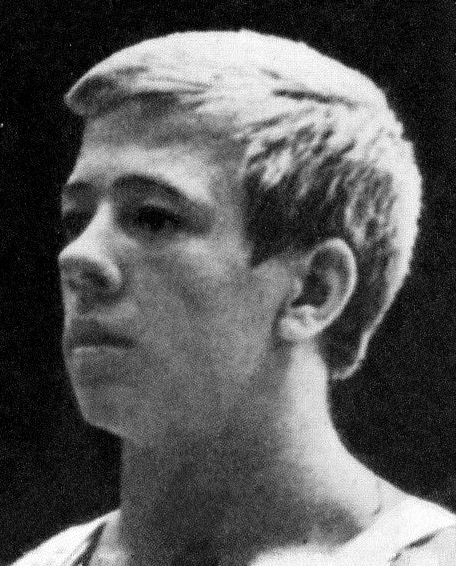
- Nikolai Andrianov (c. 1974)
- Venue: Luzhniki Palace of Sports
- Date: 20–25 July 1980
- Competitors: 65 from 14 nations
- Winning score: 19.825

Medalists
1st place, gold medalist(s)		Nikolai Andrianov; Soviet Union
2nd place, silver medalist(s)		Alexander Dityatin; Soviet Union
3rd place, bronze medalist(s)		Roland Brückner; East Germany

The men's vault competition was one of eight events for male competitors in artistic gymnastics at the 1980 Summer Olympics in Moscow. The qualification and final rounds took place on July 20, 22 and 25th at the Luzhniki Palace of Sports. There were 65 competitors from 14 nations, with nations competing in the team event having 6 gymnasts while other nations could have to up to 3 gymnasts. The event was won by Nikolai Andrianov of the Soviet Union, the first man to successfully defend an Olympic title in the vault. Andrianov was also the first (and, as of the 2016 Games, only) man to win a third medal in the event, with a bronze in 1972 along with his 1976 and 1980 gold medals. For the eighth consecutive Games, the Soviets had a gymnast in the top two in vault; this time, they had both the top two, as Alexander Dityatin took silver. Roland Brückner of East Germany earned bronze.

== Background ==
This was the 15th appearance of the event, which is one of the five apparatus events held every time there were apparatus events at the Summer Olympics (no apparatus events were held in 1900, 1908, 1912, or 1920). Three of the six finalists from 1976 returned: gold medalist Nikolai Andrianov of the Soviet Union, fourth-place finisher Dan Grecu of Romania, and fifth-place finisher Zoltán Magyar of Hungary. Andrianov had finished second to fellow Soviet Alexander Dityatin in the 1979 world championships. The American-led boycott resulted in there being no competitors from either the traditional men's gymnastics power of Japan or the rising power of the United States; the Soviets' dominance this Games would be challenged only by the East Germans.

Brazil made its debut in the men's vault. Hungary made its 13th appearance, tying the United States (absent from the vault event for the first time since the inaugural 1896 Games) for most of any nation.

== Competition format ==
The event used a "vaulting horse" aligned parallel to the gymnast's run (rather than the modern "vaulting table" in use since 2004). Each nation entered a team of six gymnasts or up to three individual gymnasts. All entrants in the gymnastics competitions performed both a compulsory exercise and a voluntary exercise for each apparatus. The scores for all 12 exercises were summed to give an individual all-around score. These exercise scores were also used for qualification for the apparatus finals. The two exercises (compulsory and voluntary) for each apparatus were summed to give an apparatus score. The top 6 in each apparatus participated in the finals, except that nations were limited to two finalists each; others were ranked 7th through 65th. Half of the preliminary score carried over to the final.

== Schedule ==
All times are Moscow Time (UTC+3)

Date	Time	Round
Sunday, 20 July 1980	10:00; 17:00	Preliminary: Compulsory
Tuesday, 22 July 1980	10:00; 17:00	Preliminary: Voluntary
Friday, 25 July 1980	14:30	Final

== Results ==
Sixty-five gymnasts competed in the compulsory and optional rounds on July 20 and 22. The six highest scoring gymnasts advanced to the final on July 25. Each country was limited to two competitors in the final. Half of the points earned by each gymnast during both the compulsory and optional rounds carried over to the final. This constitutes the "prelim" score.

Rank	Gymnast	Nation	Preliminary			Final		
Rank	Gymnast	Nation	Compulsory	Voluntary	Total	1/2 Prelim.	Final	Total
1st place, gold medalist(s)	Nikolai Andrianov	Soviet Union	9.90	9.90	19.80	9.900	9.925	19.825
2nd place, silver medalist(s)	Alexander Dityatin	Soviet Union	9.85	9.90	19.75	9.875	9.925	19.800
3rd place, bronze medalist(s)	Roland Brückner	East Germany	9.90	9.85	19.75	9.875	9.900	19.775
4	Ralf-Peter Hemmann	East Germany	9.80	9.85	19.65	9.825	9.925	19.750
5	Stoyan Deltchev	Bulgaria	9.80	9.85	19.65	9.825	9.875	19.700
6	Jiří Tabák	Czechoslovakia	9.85	9.90	19.75	9.875	9.650	19.525
7	Bohdan Makuts	Soviet Union	9.90	9.85	19.75	Did not advance		
8	Eduard Azaryan	Soviet Union	9.75	9.85	19.60	Did not advance		
8	Lutz Hoffmann	East Germany	9.80	9.80	19.60	Did not advance		
8	Jozef Konečný	Czechoslovakia	9.80	9.80	19.60	Did not advance		
8	Aleksandr Tkachyov	Soviet Union	9.80	9.80	19.60	Did not advance		
12	Willi Moy	France	9.75	9.80	19.55	Did not advance		
12	István Vámos	Hungary	9.75	9.80	19.55	Did not advance		
12	Sergio Suarez	Cuba	9.70	9.85	19.55	Did not advance		
15	Andreas Bronst	East Germany	9.70	9.80	19.50	Did not advance		
15	Aurelian Georgescu	Romania	9.65	9.85	19.50	Did not advance		
15	Zoltán Magyar	Hungary	9.75	9.75	19.50	Did not advance		
18	Michael Nikolay	East Germany	9.65	9.80	19.45	Did not advance		
18	Kurt Szilier	Romania	9.55	9.90	19.45	Did not advance		
18	Rumen Petkov	Bulgaria	9.70	9.75	19.45	Did not advance		
21	Ferenc Donáth	Hungary	9.60	9.80	19.40	Did not advance		
21	Vladimir Markelov	Soviet Union	9.80	9.60	19.40	Did not advance		
23	Sorin Cepoi	Romania	9.60	9.75	19.35	Did not advance		
23	Marc Touchais	France	9.65	9.70	19.35	Did not advance		
25	Romulus Bucuroiu	Romania	9.40	9.90	19.30	Did not advance		
25	Péter Kovács	Hungary	9.55	9.75	19.30	Did not advance		
25	Miguel Arroyo	Cuba	9.70	9.60	19.30	Did not advance		
25	Dan Grecu	Romania	9.60	9.70	19.30	Did not advance		
25	Keith Langley	Great Britain	9.60	9.70	19.30	Did not advance		
30	Lutz Mack	East Germany	9.75	9.50	19.25	Did not advance		
30	Jan Migdau	Czechoslovakia	9.60	9.65	19.25	Did not advance		
30	Yanko Radanchev	Bulgaria	9.55	9.70	19.25	Did not advance		
30	Waldemar Woźniak	Poland	9.60	9.65	19.25	Did not advance		
30	Jan Zoulik	Czechoslovakia	9.65	9.60	19.25	Did not advance		
35	Enrique Bravo	Cuba	9.60	9.60	19.20	Did not advance		
35	Miloslav Kučeřík	Czechoslovakia	9.50	9.70	19.20	Did not advance		
35	Andrzej Szajna	Poland	9.45	9.75	19.20	Did not advance		
38	Rudolf Babiak	Czechoslovakia	9.50	9.65	19.15	Did not advance		
39	Nicolae Oprescu	Romania	9.45	9.65	19.10	Did not advance		
40	Ognyan Bangiev	Bulgaria	9.50	9.55	19.05	Did not advance		
41	Michel Boutard	France	9.55	9.45	19.00	Did not advance		
41	Gabriel Calvo	Spain	9.30	9.70	19.00	Did not advance		
41	Kang Gwang-song	North Korea	9.40	9.60	19.00	Did not advance		
41	Roberto Leon	Cuba	9.50	9.50	19.00	Did not advance		
41	Song Sun-bong	North Korea	9.40	9.60	19.00	Did not advance		
46	György Guczoghy	Hungary	9.55	9.40	18.95	Did not advance		
46	Kim Gwang-jin	North Korea	9.40	9.55	18.95	Did not advance		
46	José de la Casa	Spain	9.45	9.50	18.95	Did not advance		
49	Mario Castro	Cuba	9.40	9.50	18.90	Did not advance		
49	Plamen Petkov	Bulgaria	9.25	9.65	18.90	Did not advance		
51	Fernando Bertrand	Spain	9.30	9.50	18.80	Did not advance		
51	Li Su-gil	North Korea	9.30	9.50	18.80	Did not advance		
51	Zoltán Kelemen	Hungary	9.10	9.70	18.80	Did not advance		
54	Lindsay Nylund	Australia	9.35	9.35	18.70	Did not advance		
54	Krzysztof Potaczek	Poland	9.00	9.70	18.70	Did not advance		
56	João Luiz Ribeiro	Brazil	9.40	9.25	18.65	Did not advance		
57	Yves Bouquel	France	9.30	9.30	18.60	Did not advance		
57	Han Gwang-song	North Korea	9.40	9.20	18.60	Did not advance		
57	Dancho Yordanov	Bulgaria	9.50	9.10	18.60	Did not advance		
60	Joël Suty	France	9.45	9.10	18.55	Did not advance		
61	Henri Boerio	France	9.45	9.00	18.45	Did not advance		
62	Thomas Wilson	Great Britain	9.20	9.15	18.35	Did not advance		
63	Cho Hun	North Korea	9.20	8.85	18.05	Did not advance		
64	Barry Winch	Great Britain	8.80	9.20	18.00	Did not advance		
65	Jorge Roche	Cuba	9.75	0.00	9.75	Did not advance		
—	Moustapha Chouara	Lebanon	DNS			Did not advance		
—	Adnan Horns	Lebanon	DNS			Did not advance		
—	Maurizio Zonzini	San Marino	DNS			Did not advance		
