= Gymnastics at the 1980 Summer Olympics – Men's horizontal bar =

Olympic gymnastics event

Men's horizontal bar at the Games of the XXII Olympiad
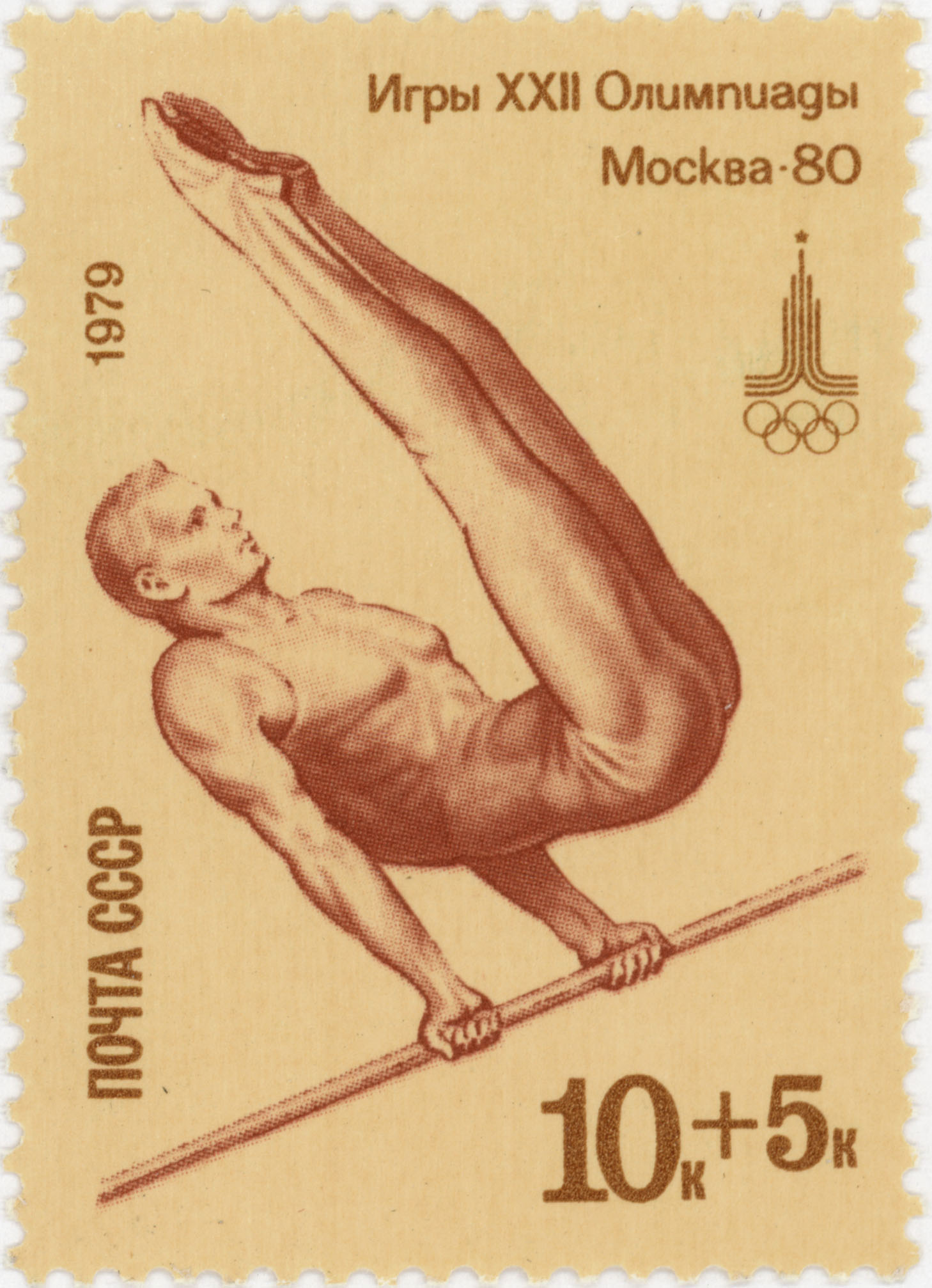
- 1979 Soviet stamp commemorating 1980 Olympic horizontal bar
- Venue: Luzhniki Palace of Sports
- Dates: 20–25 July 1980
- Competitors: 65 from 14 nations
- Winning score: 19.825

Medalists
1st place, gold medalist(s)		Stoyan Deltchev; Bulgaria
2nd place, silver medalist(s)		Alexander Dityatin; Soviet Union
3rd place, bronze medalist(s)		Nikolai Andrianov; Soviet Union

The men's horizontal bar competition was one of eight events for male competitors in artistic gymnastics at the 1980 Summer Olympics in Moscow. The qualification and final rounds took place on July 20, 22 and 25th at the Luzhniki Palace of Sports. There were 65 competitors from 14 nations, with nations competing in the team event having 6 gymnasts while other nations could have to up to 3 gymnasts. The event was won by Stoyan Deltchev of Bulgaria, the nation's first medal in the horizontal bar. The Soviet Union took silver (Alexander Dityatin) and bronze (Nikolai Andrianov), reaching the podium for the first time since 1968. Japan's three-Games gold medal streak ended, with no Japanese gymnasts competing due to the American-led boycott.

== Background ==
This was the 15th appearance of the event, which is one of the five apparatus events held every time there were apparatus events at the Summer Olympics (no apparatus events were held in 1900, 1908, 1912, or 1920). Two of the six finalists from 1976 returned: bronze medalist Henri Boerio of France and Ferenc Donath of Hungary. Japan had dominated the apparatus for decades, but would not compete in 1980 due to the American-led boycott. The reigning (1979) world champion, American Kurt Thomas, was also out due to the boycott. The Soviet Union, which had failed to medal in the apparatus the last two Games, had a strong team that looked likely to end that drought. Stoyan Deltchev of Bulgaria, fourth at the 1979 world championships, was the strongest contender against the Soviets.

Brazil made its debut in the men's horizontal bar. Hungary made its 13th appearance, tying the United States (absent from the parallel bars event for the first time since the inaugural 1896 Games) for most of any nation.

== Competition format ==
Each nation entered a team of six gymnasts or up to three individual gymnasts. All entrants in the gymnastics competitions performed both a compulsory exercise and a voluntary exercise for each apparatus. The scores for all 12 exercises were summed to give an individual all-around score. These exercise scores were also used for qualification for the apparatus finals. The two exercises (compulsory and voluntary) for each apparatus were summed to give an apparatus score. The top 6 in each apparatus participated in the finals, except that nations were limited to two finalists each; others were ranked 7th through 65th. Half of the preliminary score carried over to the final.

== Schedule ==
All times are Moscow Time (UTC+3)

Date	Time	Round
Sunday, 20 July 1980	10:00; 17:00	Preliminary: Compulsory
Tuesday, 22 July 1980	10:00; 17:00	Preliminary: Voluntary
Friday, 25 July 1980	14:30	Final

== Results ==
Sixty-five gymnasts competed in the compulsory and optional rounds on July 20 and 22. The six highest scoring gymnasts advanced to the final on July 25. Each country was limited to two competitors in the final. Half of the points earned by each gymnast during both the compulsory and optional rounds carried over to the final. This constitutes the "prelim" score.

Rank	Gymnast	Nation	Preliminary			Final		
Rank	Gymnast	Nation	Compulsory	Voluntary	Total	1/2 Prelim.	Final	Total
1st place, gold medalist(s)	Stoyan Deltchev	Bulgaria	9.90	9.85	19.75	9.875	9.950	19.825
2nd place, silver medalist(s)	Alexander Dityatin	Soviet Union	9.80	9.90	19.70	9.850	9.900	19.750
3rd place, bronze medalist(s)	Nikolai Andrianov	Soviet Union	9.80	9.85	19.65	9.825	9.850	19.675
4	Ralf-Peter Hemmann	East Germany	9.65	9.70	19.35	9.675	9.850	19.525
4	Michael Nikolay	East Germany	9.75	9.60	19.35	9.675	9.850	19.525
6	Sergio Suarez	Cuba	9.50	9.80	19.30	9.650	9.800	19.450
7	Vladimir Markelov	Soviet Union	9.75	9.85	19.60	Did not advance		
8	Eduard Azaryan	Soviet Union	9.75	9.80	19.55	Did not advance		
9	Bohdan Makuts	Soviet Union	9.65	9.70	19.35	Did not advance		
10	Joël Suty	France	9.55	9.70	19.25	Did not advance		
11	Ferenc Donáth	Hungary	9.60	9.60	19.20	Did not advance		
11	Dancho Yordanov	Bulgaria	9.60	9.60	19.20	Did not advance		
13	Kurt Szilier	Romania	9.50	9.65	19.15	Did not advance		
14	Aleksandr Tkachyov	Soviet Union	9.10	9.95	19.05	Did not advance		
15	Henri Boerio	France	9.40	9.60	19.00	Did not advance		
15	Lutz Hoffmann	East Germany	9.50	9.50	19.00	Did not advance		
17	György Guczoghy	Hungary	9.30	9.65	18.95	Did not advance		
17	Péter Kovács	Hungary	9.70	9.25	18.95	Did not advance		
17	Zoltán Magyar	Hungary	9.50	9.45	18.95	Did not advance		
20	Jiří Tabák	Czechoslovakia	9.40	9.45	18.85	Did not advance		
21	Andreas Bronst	East Germany	9.35	9.45	18.80	Did not advance		
21	Nicolae Oprescu	Romania	9.35	9.45	18.80	Did not advance		
23	Enrique Bravo	Cuba	9.30	9.45	18.75	Did not advance		
23	Dan Grecu	Romania	9.25	9.50	18.75	Did not advance		
23	Roberto Leon	Cuba	9.50	9.25	18.75	Did not advance		
26	Miguel Arroyo	Cuba	9.55	9.15	18.70	Did not advance		
26	Rudolf Babiak	Czechoslovakia	9.30	9.40	18.70	Did not advance		
26	Andrzej Szajna	Poland	9.55	9.15	18.70	Did not advance		
26	Ognyan Bangiev	Bulgaria	9.50	9.20	18.70	Did not advance		
30	Roland Brückner	East Germany	9.60	9.05	18.65	Did not advance		
31	Zoltán Kelemen	Hungary	9.35	9.25	18.60	Did not advance		
31	Jan Migdau	Czechoslovakia	9.30	9.30	18.60	Did not advance		
31	István Vámos	Hungary	9.40	9.20	18.60	Did not advance		
34	Willi Moy	France	9.10	9.45	18.55	Did not advance		
34	Yanko Radanchev	Bulgaria	9.35	9.20	18.55	Did not advance		
34	Jan Zoulik	Czechoslovakia	9.35	9.20	18.55	Did not advance		
37	Sorin Cepoi	Romania	9.05	9.45	18.50	Did not advance		
37	Aurelian Georgescu	Romania	9.30	9.20	18.50	Did not advance		
39	Waldemar Woźniak	Poland	9.30	9.15	18.45	Did not advance		
40	Gabriel Calvo	Spain	9.25	9.15	18.40	Did not advance		
40	Lutz Mack	East Germany	9.45	8.95	18.40	Did not advance		
42	José de la Casa	Spain	9.20	9.15	18.35	Did not advance		
42	Barry Winch	Great Britain	9.10	9.25	18.35	Did not advance		
44	Kang Gwang-song	North Korea	9.00	9.30	18.30	Did not advance		
44	Michel Boutard	France	8.95	9.35	18.30	Did not advance		
46	Keith Langley	Great Britain	8.90	9.35	18.25	Did not advance		
46	Rumen Petkov	Bulgaria	9.20	9.05	18.25	Did not advance		
46	Thomas Wilson	Great Britain	9.15	9.10	18.25	Did not advance		
49	Plamen Petkov	Bulgaria	9.40	8.80	18.20	Did not advance		
49	Song Sun-bong	North Korea	8.80	9.40	18.20	Did not advance		
51	Romulus Bucuroiu	Romania	8.80	9.35	18.15	Did not advance		
52	Yves Bouquel	France	8.90	9.20	18.10	Did not advance		
53	Mario Castro	Cuba	9.25	8.80	18.05	Did not advance		
53	Lindsay Nylund	Australia	8.75	9.30	18.05	Did not advance		
53	Li Su-gil	North Korea	8.60	9.45	18.05	Did not advance		
56	Cho Hun	North Korea	9.00	9.00	18.00	Did not advance		
56	Jozef Konečný	Czechoslovakia	8.65	9.35	18.00	Did not advance		
58	Fernando Bertrand	Spain	9.25	8.70	17.95	Did not advance		
59	Krzysztof Potaczek	Poland	9.20	8.65	17.85	Did not advance		
59	Marc Touchais	France	9.05	8.80	17.85	Did not advance		
61	João Luiz Ribeiro	Brazil	8.55	9.10	17.65	Did not advance		
62	Miloslav Kučeřík	Czechoslovakia	8.30	9.25	17.55	Did not advance		
63	Kim Gwang-jin	North Korea	8.65	8.85	17.50	Did not advance		
64	Han Gwang-song	North Korea	8.30	9.15	17.45	Did not advance		
65	Jorge Roche	Cuba	9.45	0.00	9.45	Did not advance		
—	Moustapha Chouara	Lebanon	DNS			Did not advance		
—	Adnan Horns	Lebanon	DNS			Did not advance		
—	Maurizio Zonzini	San Marino	DNS			Did not advance		
