= Gymnastics at the 1980 Summer Olympics – Men's artistic individual all-around =

Olympic gymnastics event

Men's artistic individual all-around at the Games of the XXII Olympiad
- Pictogram for Gymnastics
- Venue: Luzhniki Palace of Sports
- Dates: 20–24 July 1980
- Competitors: 65 from 14 nations
- Winning score: 118.650

Medalists
1st place, gold medalist(s)		Alexander Dityatin; Soviet Union
2nd place, silver medalist(s)		Nikolai Andrianov; Soviet Union
3rd place, bronze medalist(s)		Stoyan Deltchev; Bulgaria

The men's individual all-around competition was one of eight events for male competitors in artistic gymnastics at the 1980 Summer Olympics in Moscow. The qualification and final rounds took place on July 20, 22 and 24th at the Sports Palace of the Central Lenin Stadium. There were 65 competitors from 14 nations. Each nation could enter a team of 6 gymnasts or up to 3 individual gymnasts. The event was won by Alexander Dityatin of the Soviet Union, the nation's second consecutive and fifth overall victory in the event (taking the lead for most among nations at the time). It was the second of Dityatin's 8 total medals in 1980, a record that still stands through the 2016 Games (though it has been tied twice by Michael Phelps, including his 2008 performance of 8 gold medals). Dityatin's teammate, defending gold medalist Nikolai Andrianov, finished with the silver medal. Andrianov was the 10th man to win multiple medals in the event; he would also finish the 1980 Games with a total of 15 medals over all years—most among men at the time (though behind Larisa Latynina's 18; Phelps would later shatter both those totals with 28). Bronze went to Stoyan Deltchev of Bulgaria—the first medal in the event by a gymnast not from the Soviet Union or Japan since 1952. It was Bulgaria's first-ever medal in the men's all-around. Japan, which had joined the American-led 1980 Summer Olympics boycott and did not compete, had its six-Games podium streak ended.

== Background ==
This was the 18th appearance of the men's individual all-around. The first individual all-around competition had been held in 1900, after the 1896 competitions featured only individual apparatus events. A men's individual all-around has been held every Games since 1900.

Five of the top 10 gymnasts from the 1976 Games returned: gold medalist Nikolai Andrianov of the Soviet Union, fourth-place finisher Alexander Dityatin of the Soviet Union, sixth-place finisher Andrzej Szajna of Poland, seventh-place finisher Michael Nikolay of East Germany, and ninth-place finisher Zoltán Magyar of Hungary. The World Championships had shifted from a quadrennial (non-Olympic even years) to a biennial (odd years) event, so there had been two World Champions since the last Games: Andrianov (1978) and Dityatin (1979). Significant absences due to the American-led boycott included Kurt Thomas of the United States (second at the 1979 World Championships) and the entire Japanese team, especially Eizo Kenmotsu (second at the 1978 World Championships).

Brazil made its debut in the event. France made its 16th appearance, most among nations (moving out of a tie with Italy, not competing in the event this time).

== Competition format ==
The competition format followed the preliminary and final format introduced in 1972, with the limit on the number of finalists per nation added in 1976. All entrants in the gymnastics competitions performed both a compulsory exercise and a voluntary exercise for each apparatus. The scores for all 12 exercises were summed to give an individual all-around preliminary score. Half of the scores from the preliminary carried over to the final, with the top 36 gymnasts advancing to the individual all-around final—except that each nation was limited to 3 finalists. There, each of the finalists performed another exercise on each apparatus. The sum of these scores plus half of the preliminary score resulted in a final total.

Each exercise was scored from 0 to 10; thus, the preliminary apparatus scores ranged from 0 to 20 each and the total preliminary score from 0 to 120. With half of the preliminary score and six more exercises scored 0 to 10, the final total was also from 0 to 120.

The preliminary exercise scores were also used for qualification for the apparatus finals.

== Schedule ==
All times are Moscow Time (UTC+3)

Date	Time	Round
Sunday, 20 July 1980	10:00; 17:00	Preliminary: Compulsory
Tuesday, 22 July 1980	10:00; 17:00	Preliminary: Voluntary
Thursday, 24 July 1980	14:30	Final

== Results ==
Sixty-eight gymnasts competed in the compulsory and optional rounds on July 20 and 22. The thirty-six highest scoring gymnasts advanced to the final on July 24. Each country was limited to three competitors in the final. Half of the points earned by each gymnast during both the compulsory and optional rounds carried over to the final. This constitutes each gymnast's "prelim" score.

Rank	Gymnast	Nation	Prelim	1/2 Prelim	Floor	Pommel horse	Rings	Vault	Parallel bars	Horizontal bar	Final	Total
1st place, gold medalist(s)	Alexander Dityatin	Soviet Union	118.40	59.200	9.800	9.900	9.950	10.000	9.850	9.950	59.450	118.650
2nd place, silver medalist(s)	Nikolai Andrianov	Soviet Union	118.15	59.075	9.800	9.900	9.900	9.900	9.750	9.900	59.150	118.225
3rd place, bronze medalist(s)	Stoyan Deltchev	Bulgaria	117.50	58.750	9.700	9.900	10.000	9.900	9.800	9.950	59.250	118.000
4	Aleksandr Tkachyov	Soviet Union	117.40	58.700	9.550	9.800	9.850	9.900	9.900	10.000	59.000	117.700
5	Roland Brückner	East Germany	116.90	58.450	9.800	9.800	9.950	9.900	9.650	9.750	58.850	117.300
6	Michael Nikolay	East Germany	116.50	58.250	9.350	10.000	9.850	9.850	9.650	9.800	58.500	116.750
7	Lutz Hoffmann	East Germany	115.75	57.875	9.600	9.400	9.800	9.900	9.550	9.900	58.150	116.025
8	Jiří Tabák	Czechoslovakia	115.95	57.975	9.700	9.150	9.800	9.800	9.450	9.800	57.700	115.675
9	Danuț Grecu	Romania	114.85	57.425	9.150	9.600	9.850	9.800	9.550	9.850	57.800	115.225
10	Zoltán Magyar	Hungary	115.85	57.925	9.100	10.000	9.800	9.550	9.100	9.750	57.300	115.225
11	Péter Kovács	Hungary	114.70	57.350	9.600	9.800	9.800	9.800	9.550	9.300	57.850	115.200
12	Ferenc Donáth	Hungary	115.90	57.950	9.250	9.300	9.100	9.800	9.550	9.900	56.900	114.850
13	Dancho Yordanov	Bulgaria	113.75	56.875	9.350	9.700	9.750	9.600	9.650	9.800	57.850	114.725
14	Kurt Szilier	Romania	114.80	57.400	9.400	9.700	9.800	9.600	8.900	9.850	57.250	114.650
15	Plamen Petkov	Bulgaria	113.50	56.750	9.550	9.200	9.750	9.900	9.500	9.750	57.650	114.400
16	Willi Moy	France	112.85	56.425	9.350	9.600	9.900	9.850	9.300	9.850	57.850	114.275
17	Andrzej Szajna	Poland	112.85	56.425	9.250	9.600	9.750	9.850	9.550	9.800	57.800	114.225
18	Aurelian Georgescu	Romania	113.75	56.875	9.500	9.550	9.800	9.900	8.900	9.550	57.200	114.075
19	Sergio Suárez	Cuba	112.50	56.250	9.650	9.400	9.700	9.900	9.200	9.800	57.650	113.900
20	Michel Boutard	France	112.95	56.475	9.500	9.650	9.300	9.650	9.600	9.550	57.250	113.725
21	Rudolf Babiak	Czechoslovakia	114.10	57.050	9.400	8.900	9.800	9.550	9.100	9.750	56.500	113.550
22	Miguel Arroyo	Cuba	112.15	56.075	9.150	9.550	9.850	9.550	9.550	9.900	57.450	113.525
23	Roberto León	Cuba	112.45	56.225	8.900	9.850	9.550	9.800	9.650	9.400	57.150	113.375
24	Henri Boerio	France	111.35	55.675	9.300	9.800	9.700	9.850	9.400	9.550	57.600	113.275
25	Jan Zoulík	Czechoslovakia	113.70	56.850	9.400	9.200	9.350	9.750	8.900	9.650	56.250	113.100
26	Han Gwang-song	North Korea	109.80	54.900	9.300	9.650	9.800	9.550	9.350	9.800	57.450	112.350
27	Kang Gwang-song	North Korea	109.70	54.850	9.150	9.650	9.850	9.450	9.650	9.700	57.450	112.300
28	Gabriel Calvo	Spain	110.55	55.275	9.200	9.000	9.450	9.800	9.250	9.650	56.350	111.625
29	Waldemar Woźniak	Poland	110.85	55.425	9.100	8.950	9.750	9.850	8.900	9.600	56.150	111.575
30	Barry Winch	Great Britain	109.75	54.875	9.150	8.800	9.600	9.800	9.400	9.500	56.250	111.125
31	Thomas Wilson	Great Britain	108.95	54.475	9.350	9.250	9.650	9.500	8.400	9.750	55.900	110.375
32	José de la Casa	Spain	109.40	54.700	8.900	9.300	9.150	9.700	9.000	9.550	55.600	110.300
33	Fernando García	Spain	108.75	54.375	9.000	9.500	9.350	9.200	8.850	9.550	55.450	109.825
34	Lindsay Nylund	Australia	109.15	54.575	8.800	8.600	9.350	9.700	8.950	9.700	55.100	109.675
35	Keith Langley	Great Britain	109.15	54.575	9.150	8.650	9.200	9.900	8.450	9.700	55.050	109.625
36	Kim Gwang-jin	North Korea	109.80	54.900	0.000	0.000	0.000	0.000	0.000	0.000	0.000	54.900
37	Eduard Azaryan	Soviet Union	117.40	Did not advance—3 per nation rule								
38	Bohdan Makuts	Soviet Union	116.95	Did not advance—3 per nation rule								
39	Vladimir Markelov	Soviet Union	116.40	Did not advance—3 per nation rule								
40	Ralf-Peter Hemmann	East Germany	115.70	Did not advance—3 per nation rule								
41	Andreas Bronst	East Germany	114.85	Did not advance—3 per nation rule								
42	Lutz Mack	East Germany	114.00	Did not advance—3 per nation rule								
43	György Guczoghy	Hungary	113.85	Did not advance—3 per nation rule								
44	Sorin Cepoi	Romania	113.55	Did not advance—3 per nation rule								
45	István Vámos	Hungary	113.10	Did not advance—3 per nation rule								
46	Romulus Bucuroiu	Romania	112.75	Did not advance—3 per nation rule								
47	Nicolae Oprescu	Romania	112.95	Did not advance—3 per nation rule								
48	Zoltán Kelemen	Hungary	112.70	Did not advance—3 per nation rule								
49	Rumen Petkov	Bulgaria	112.50	Did not advance—3 per nation rule								
50	Miloslav Kučeřík	Czechoslovakia	112.10	Did not advance—3 per nation rule								
51	Ognyan Bangiev	Bulgaria	112.05	Did not advance—3 per nation rule								
52	Jan Migdau	Czechoslovakia	111.95	Did not advance—3 per nation rule								
53	Enrique Bravo	Cuba	111.75	Did not advance—3 per nation rule								
54	Yanko Radanchev	Bulgaria	111.60	Did not advance—3 per nation rule								
55	Jozef Konečný	Czechoslovakia	111.35	Did not advance—3 per nation rule								
56	Joël Suty	France	111.25	Did not advance—3 per nation rule								
57	Mario Castro	Cuba	111.15	Did not advance—3 per nation rule								
58	Cho Hun	North Korea	108.90	Did not advance—3 per nation rule								
59	Yves Bouquel	France	108.65	Did not advance								
60	Song Sun-bong	North Korea	108.60	Did not advance								
61	Li Su-gil	North Korea	108.30	Did not advance								
62	Marc Touchais	France	108.10	Did not advance								
63	Krzysztof Potaczek	Poland	108.05	Did not advance								
64	João Luiz Ribeiro	Brazil	105.75	Did not advance								
65	Jorge Roche	Cuba	83.40	Did not advance								
