= Gymnastics at the 1980 Summer Olympics – Men's pommel horse =

Olympic gymnastics event

Men's pommel horse at the Games of the XXII Olympiad
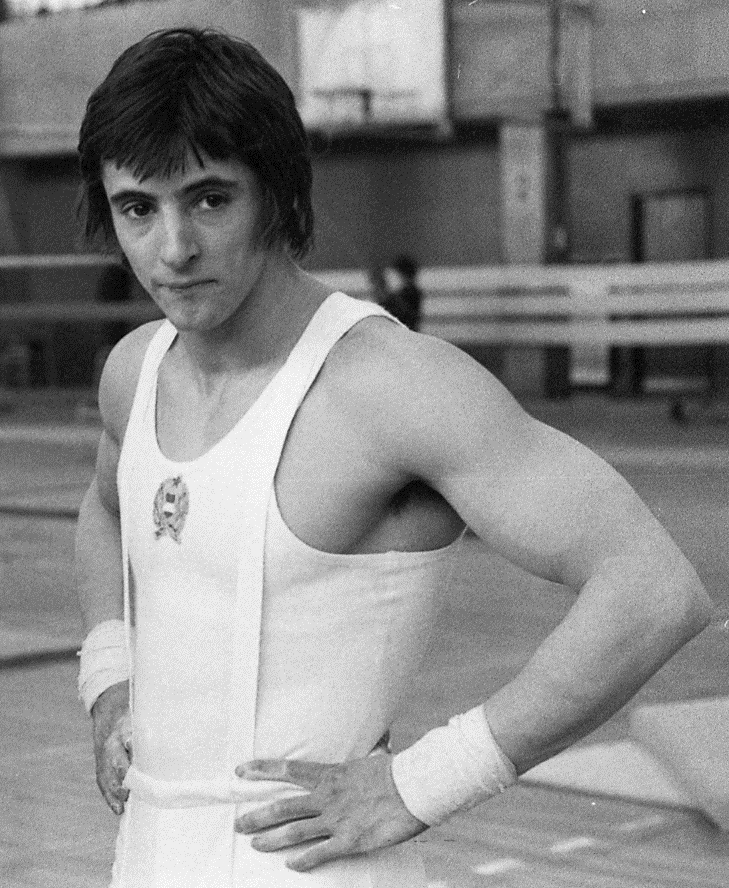
- Zoltán Magyar (1976)
- Venue: Luzhniki Palace of Sports
- Dates: 20–25 July 1980
- Competitors: 65 from 14 nations
- Winning score: 19.925

Medalists
1st place, gold medalist(s)		Zoltán Magyar; Hungary
2nd place, silver medalist(s)		Alexander Dityatin; Soviet Union
3rd place, bronze medalist(s)		Michael Nikolay; East Germany

The men's pommel horse competition was one of eight events for male competitors in artistic gymnastics at the 1980 Summer Olympics in Moscow. The qualification and final rounds took place on July 20, 22 and 25 at the Luzhniki Palace of Sports. There were 65 competitors from 14 nations, with nations competing in the team event having 6 gymnasts while other nations could have to up to 3 gymnasts. The event was won by Zoltán Magyar of Hungary, the third man to successfully defend an Olympic title in the pommel horse. Silver went to Alexander Dityatin, extending the Soviet Union's podium streak in the event to eight Games. Michael Nikolay of East Germany took bronze for the second consecutive Games. Magyar and Nikolay were the sixth and seventh men to earn multiple pommel horse medals.

== Background ==
This was the 15th appearance of the event, which is one of the five apparatus events held every time there were apparatus events at the Summer Olympics (no apparatus events were held in 1900, 1908, 1912, or 1920). Four of the six finalists from 1976 returned: gold medalist Zoltán Magyar of Hungary, bronze medalists Nikolai Andrianov of the Soviet Union and Michael Nikolay of East Germany, and sixth-place finisher Alexander Dityatin of the Soviet Union. Magyar had also won the last three world championships (1974, 1978, and 1979) and was a heavy favorite. The American-led boycott resulted in there being no competitors from either the traditional men's gymnastics power of Japan or the rising power of the United States; the Soviets' dominance this Games would be challenged only by the East Germans and occasional specialists such as Magyar (on the men's side, at least; Romania had a strong women's team).

Brazil made its debut in the men's pommel horse. Hungary made its 13th appearance, tying the United States (absent from the pommel horse event for the first time since the inaugural 1896 Games) for most of any nation.

== Competition format ==
Each nation entered a team of six gymnasts or up to three individual gymnasts. All entrants in the gymnastics competitions performed both a compulsory exercise and a voluntary exercise for each apparatus. The scores for all 12 exercises were summed to give an individual all-around score. These exercise scores were also used for qualification for the apparatus finals. The two exercises (compulsory and voluntary) for each apparatus were summed to give an apparatus score. The top 6 in each apparatus participated in the finals, except that nations were limited to two finalists each; others were ranked 7th through 65th. Half of the preliminary score carried over to the final.

== Schedule ==
All times are Moscow Time (UTC+3)

Date	Time	Round
Sunday, 20 July 1980	10:00; 17:00	Preliminary: Compulsory
Tuesday, 22 July 1980	10:00; 17:00	Preliminary: Voluntary
Friday, 25 July 1980	14:30	Final

== Results ==
Sixty-five gymnasts competed in the compulsory and optional rounds on July 20 and 22. The six highest scoring gymnasts advanced to the final on July 25. Each country was limited to two competitors in the final. Half of the points earned by each gymnast during both the compulsory and optional rounds carried over to the final. This constitutes the "prelim" score.

Rank	Gymnast	Nation	Preliminary			Final		
Rank	Gymnast	Nation	Compulsory	Voluntary	Total	1/2 Prelim.	Final	Total
1st place, gold medalist(s)	Zoltán Magyar	Hungary	9.90	9.95	19.85	9.925	10.000	19.925
2nd place, silver medalist(s)	Alexander Dityatin	Soviet Union	9.90	9.90	19.80	9.900	9.900	19.800
3rd place, bronze medalist(s)	Michael Nikolay	East Germany	9.90	9.85	19.75	9.875	9.900	19.775
4	Roland Brückner	East Germany	9.80	9.85	19.65	9.825	9.900	19.725
5	Aleksandr Tkachyov	Soviet Union	9.90	9.85	19.75	9.875	9.600	19.475
6	Ferenc Donáth	Hungary	9.75	9.85	19.60	9.800	9.600	19.400
7	Eduard Azaryan	Soviet Union	9.80	9.90	19.70	Did not advance		
8	Nikolai Andrianov	Soviet Union	9.75	9.85	19.60	Did not advance		
8	Vladimir Markelov	Soviet Union	9.80	9.80	19.60	Did not advance		
10	Stoyan Deltchev	Bulgaria	9.65	9.85	19.50	Did not advance		
11	Lutz Hoffmann	East Germany	9.70	9.75	19.45	Did not advance		
11	Bohdan Makuts	Soviet Union	9.70	9.75	19.45	Did not advance		
13	György Guczoghy	Hungary	9.65	9.75	19.40	Did not advance		
14	Michel Boutard	France	9.60	9.75	19.35	Did not advance		
14	Andreas Bronst	East Germany	9.60	9.75	19.35	Did not advance		
14	Romulus Bucuroiu	Romania	9.65	9.70	19.35	Did not advance		
14	Kurt Szilier	Romania	9.65	9.70	19.35	Did not advance		
18	Roberto Leon	Cuba	9.65	9.65	19.30	Did not advance		
19	Rudolf Babiak	Czechoslovakia	9.45	9.75	19.20	Did not advance		
19	Ralf-Peter Hemmann	East Germany	9.50	9.70	19.20	Did not advance		
19	Zoltán Kelemen	Hungary	9.50	9.70	19.20	Did not advance		
22	Miloslav Kučeřík	Czechoslovakia	9.45	9.70	19.15	Did not advance		
22	Joël Suty	France	9.50	9.65	19.15	Did not advance		
24	Péter Kovács	Hungary	9.35	9.75	19.10	Did not advance		
25	Plamen Petkov	Bulgaria	9.40	9.65	19.05	Did not advance		
25	Jiří Tabák	Czechoslovakia	9.55	9.50	19.05	Did not advance		
27	Enrique Bravo	Cuba	9.55	9.45	19.00	Did not advance		
28	Sorin Cepoi	Romania	9.45	9.50	18.95	Did not advance		
29	Dan Grecu	Romania	9.25	9.65	18.90	Did not advance		
29	Andrzej Szajna	Poland	9.30	9.60	18.90	Did not advance		
29	Dancho Yordanov	Bulgaria	9.40	9.50	18.90	Did not advance		
32	Jan Zoulik	Czechoslovakia	9.00	9.80	18.80	Did not advance		
33	István Vámos	Hungary	9.25	9.50	18.75	Did not advance		
34	Miguel Arroyo	Cuba	9.45	9.25	18.70	Did not advance		
34	Henri Boerio	France	9.45	9.25	18.70	Did not advance		
34	Willi Moy	France	9.30	9.40	18.70	Did not advance		
37	Yves Bouquel	France	9.50	9.05	18.55	Did not advance		
37	Krzysztof Potaczek	Poland	9.55	9.00	18.55	Did not advance		
37	Thomas Wilson	Great Britain	9.25	9.30	18.55	Did not advance		
37	Barry Winch	Great Britain	9.25	9.30	18.55	Did not advance		
41	Aurelian Georgescu	Romania	8.90	9.60	18.50	Did not advance		
42	Jorge Roche	Cuba	9.40	9.05	18.45	Did not advance		
43	Lutz Mack	East Germany	8.80	9.60	18.40	Did not advance		
43	Rumen Petkov	Bulgaria	9.00	9.40	18.40	Did not advance		
45	Ognyan Bangiev	Bulgaria	9.25	9.10	18.35	Did not advance		
46	Lindsay Nylund	Australia	8.90	9.35	18.25	Did not advance		
47	Nicolae Oprescu	Romania	8.85	9.35	18.20	Did not advance		
47	Waldemar Woźniak	Poland	8.85	9.35	18.20	Did not advance		
49	Yanko Radanchev	Bulgaria	8.60	9.55	18.15	Did not advance		
50	Mario Castro	Cuba	9.15	8.80	17.95	Did not advance		
51	Gabriel Calvo	Spain	9.00	8.90	17.90	Did not advance		
52	Fernando Bertrand	Spain	9.05	8.80	17.85	Did not advance		
52	José de la Casa	Spain	8.95	8.90	17.85	Did not advance		
52	Marc Touchais	France	9.00	8.85	17.85	Did not advance		
55	Han Gwang-song	North Korea	8.80	8.90	17.70	Did not advance		
55	Keith Langley	Great Britain	9.05	8.65	17.70	Did not advance		
55	Jan Migdau	Czechoslovakia	8.50	9.20	17.70	Did not advance		
58	Jozef Konečný	Czechoslovakia	8.05	9.55	17.60	Did not advance		
59	Cho Hun	North Korea	8.40	9.15	17.55	Did not advance		
60	Song Sun-bong	North Korea	8.35	8.85	17.20	Did not advance		
60	Sergio Suarez	Cuba	8.95	8.25	17.20	Did not advance		
62	Kang Gwang-song	North Korea	7.55	9.45	17.00	Did not advance		
63	João Luiz Ribeiro	Brazil	8.55	8.30	16.85	Did not advance		
64	Li Su-gil	North Korea	8.00	8.65	16.65	Did not advance		
65	Kim Gwang-jin	North Korea	7.95	8.60	16.55	Did not advance		
—	Moustapha Chouara	Lebanon	DNS			Did not advance		
—	Adnan Horns	Lebanon	DNS			Did not advance		
—	Maurizio Zonzini	San Marino	DNS			Did not advance		
