= List of gymnasts at the 1980 Summer Olympics =

This is a list of the gymnasts who represented their country at the 1980 Summer Olympics in Moscow from 19 July to 3 August 1980. Only one discipline, artistic gymnastics, was included in the Games.

== Female artistic gymnasts ==
	Name	Country	Date of birth (Age)
Youngest competitor	Anita Jokiel	Poland	2 December 1966 (aged 13)
Oldest competitor	Łucja Matraszek	Poland	4 May 1954 (aged 26)

NOC	Name	Date of birth (Age)	Hometown
Australia	Kerry Bayliss	19 June 1962 (aged 18)	
Australia	Marina Sulicich	18 February 1964 (aged 16)	Broken Hill, New South Wales
Brazil	Cláudia Costa	27 January 1962 (aged 18)	Rio de Janeiro, Brazil
Bulgaria	Kamelia Eftimova	3 May 1966 (aged 14)	Sofia, Bulgaria
Bulgaria	Dimitrinka Filipova	7 May 1966 (aged 14)	
Bulgaria	Galina Marinova	1 September 1964 (aged 15)	
Bulgaria	Antoaneta Rakhneva	4 October 1962 (aged 17)	
Bulgaria	Krasimira Toneva	24 June 1965 (aged 15)	
Bulgaria	Silvia Topalova	7 March 1964 (aged 16)	
Czechoslovakia	Dana Brýdlová	16 October 1963 (aged 16)	Brno, Czechoslovakia
Czechoslovakia	Jana Labáková	26 January 1966 (aged 14)	Detva, Czechoslovakia
Czechoslovakia	Eva Marečková	18 May 1964 (aged 16)	Detva, Czechoslovakia
Czechoslovakia	Katarína Šarišská	28 September 1965 (aged 14)	Znojmo, Czechoslovakia
Czechoslovakia	Anita Šauerová	26 February 1963 (aged 17)	Brno, Czechoslovakia
Czechoslovakia	Radka Zemanová	5 December 1963 (aged 16)	Ostrava, Czechoslovakia
East Germany	Maxi Gnauck	10 October 1964 (aged 15)	Berlin, East Germany
East Germany	Silvia Hindorff	27 June 1961 (aged 19)	Sebnitz, East Germany
East Germany	Steffi Kräker	21 April 1960 (aged 20)	Leipzig, East Germany
East Germany	Katharina Rensch	7 October 1964 (aged 15)	Berlin, East Germany
East Germany	Karola Sube	28 April 1964 (aged 16)	Bautzen, East Germany
East Germany	Birgit Süß	29 March 1962 (aged 18)	Halle, East Germany
Great Britain	Susan Cheesebrough	9 September 1959 (aged 20)	Leicester, England
Great Britain	Suzanne Dando	3 July 1961 (aged 19)	Wandsworth, England
Great Britain	Denise Jones	11 December 1962 (aged 17)	
Hungary	Lenke Almási	22 March 1965 (aged 15)	Budapest, Hungary
Hungary	Erika Csányi	22 May 1965 (aged 15)	Budapest, Hungary
Hungary	Márta Egervári	4 August 1956 (aged 23)	Budapest, Hungary
Hungary	Erika Flander	5 February 1965 (aged 15)	Budapest, Hungary
Hungary	Erzsébet Hanti	21 October 1964 (aged 15)	Kecskemét, Hungary
Hungary	Éva Óvári	28 April 1962 (aged 18)	Dunaújváros, Hungary
Mexico	Estela de la Torre	14 February 1965 (aged 15)	Mexico City, Mexico
Mongolia	Dashzevgiin Ariunaa	17 October 1965 (aged 14)	
Mongolia	Davaasürengiin Oyuuntuyaa	29 July 1966 (aged 13)	
North Korea	Choe Jong-sil	23 June 1966 (aged 14)	
North Korea	Choi Myong-hui	13 June 1966 (aged 14)	
North Korea	Kang Myong-suk	9 November 1965 (aged 14)	
North Korea	Kim Chun-son	14 December 1960 (aged 19)	
North Korea	Lo Ok-sil	15 April 1966 (aged 14)	
North Korea	Sin Myong-ok	30 November 1965 (aged 14)	
Poland	Agata Jaroszek	29 November 1963 (aged 16)	Warsaw, Poland
Poland	Anita Jokiel	2 December 1966 (aged 13)	Ruda Śląska, Poland
Poland	Małgorzata Majza	22 February 1965 (aged 15)	Ruda Śląska, Poland
Poland	Łucja Matraszek	4 May 1954 (aged 26)	Warsaw, Poland
Poland	Katarzyna Snopko	11 August 1965 (aged 14)	Warsaw, Poland
Poland	Wiesława Żelaskowska	13 September 1964 (aged 15)	Olsztyn, Poland
Portugal	Maria Avelina Álvarez	14 October 1961 (aged 18)	
Romania	Nadia Comăneci	12 November 1961 (aged 18)	Onești, Romania
Romania	Rodica Dunca	16 May 1965 (aged 15)	Baia Mare, Romania
Romania	Emilia Eberle	4 March 1964 (aged 16)	Arad, Romania
Romania	Cristina Grigoraș	11 February 1966 (aged 14)	Satu Mare, Romania
Romania	Melita Ruhn	19 April 1965 (aged 15)	Sibiu, Romania
Romania	Dumitrița Turner	12 February 1964 (aged 16)	Onești, Romania
Soviet Union	Elena Davydova	7 August 1961 (aged 18)	Voronezh, Russian SFSR
Soviet Union	Maria Filatova	19 July 1961 (aged 19)	Leninsk-Kuznetsky, Russian SFSR
Soviet Union	Nellie Kim	29 July 1957 (aged 22)	Shurab, Tajik SSR
Soviet Union	Elena Naimushina	19 November 1964 (aged 15)	Askiz, Russian SFSR
Soviet Union	Natalia Shaposhnikova	24 June 1961 (aged 19)	Rostov-on-Don, Russian SFSR
Soviet Union	Stella Zakharova	12 July 1963 (aged 17)	Odessa, Ukrainian SSR
Spain	Irene Martínez	20 February 1966 (aged 14)	Madrid, Spain
Spain	Aurora Morata	26 February 1961 (aged 19)	Vilanova i la Geltrú, Spain
Spain	Gloria Viseras	9 February 1965 (aged 15)	Mexico City, Mexico
Sweden	Lena Adomat	22 June 1964 (aged 16)	Västerås, Sweden

== Male artistic gymnasts ==
	Name	Country	Date of birth (Age)
Youngest competitor	Li Su-gil	North Korea	3 July 1964 (aged 16)
Oldest competitor	Andrzej Szajna	Poland	30 September 1949 (aged 30)

NOC	Name	Date of birth (Age)	Hometown
Australia	Lindsay Nylund	30 April 1958 (aged 22)	
Brazil	João Luiz Ribeiro	15 July 1959 (aged 21)	São Joaquim, Brazil
Bulgaria	Ognyan Bangiev	15 June 1956 (aged 24)	
Bulgaria	Stoyan Deltchev	3 July 1959 (aged 21)	Plovdiv, Bulgaria
Bulgaria	Plamen Petkov	1 September 1959 (aged 20)	
Bulgaria	Rumen Petkov	1 September 1959 (aged 20)	
Bulgaria	Yanko Radanchev	23 April 1957 (aged 23)	
Bulgaria	Dancho Yordanov	23 November 1958 (aged 21)	
Cuba	Miguel Arroyo	17 June 1962 (aged 18)	
Cuba	Enrique Bravo	14 January 1955 (aged 25)	
Cuba	Mario Castro	8 January 1962 (aged 18)	
Cuba	Roberto León	12 June 1954 (aged 26)	Cárdenas, Cuba
Cuba	Jorge Roche	19 November 1957 (aged 22)	
Cuba	Sergio Suárez	4 March 1962 (aged 18)	
Czechoslovakia	Rudolf Babiak	12 April 1956 (aged 24)	Banská Bystrica, Czechoslovakia
Czechoslovakia	Jozef Konečný	2 December 1953 (aged 26)	Bratislava, Czechoslovakia
Czechoslovakia	Miloslav Kučeřík	22 June 1959 (aged 21)	Vsetín, Czechoslovakia
Czechoslovakia	Jan Migdau	17 June 1958 (aged 22)	Čáslav, Czechoslovakia
Czechoslovakia	Jiří Tabák	8 August 1955 (aged 24)	Karviná, Czechoslovakia
Czechoslovakia	Jan Zoulík	2 February 1957 (aged 23)	Horní Počernice, Czechoslovakia
East Germany	Andreas Bronst	12 November 1957 (aged 22)	Rochlitz, East Germany
East Germany	Roland Brückner	14 December 1955 (aged 24)	Köthen, East Germany
East Germany	Ralf-Peter Hemmann	8 December 1958 (aged 21)	Dresden, East Germany
East Germany	Lutz Hoffmann	30 January 1959 (aged 21)	Weißenfels, East Germany
East Germany	Lutz Mack	29 October 1952 (aged 27)	Delitzsch, East Germany
East Germany	Michael Nikolay	13 December 1956 (aged 23)	Berlin, East Germany
France	Henri Boërio	13 June 1952 (aged 28)	Sétif, Algeria
France	Yves Bouquel	10 March 1955 (aged 25)	
France	Michel Boutard	21 April 1956 (aged 24)	
France	Willi Moy	13 June 1956 (aged 24)	
France	Joël Suty	4 July 1960 (aged 20)	
France	Marc Touchais	21 March 1958 (aged 22)	
Great Britain	Keith Langley	3 June 1961 (aged 19)	Aldershot, England
Great Britain	Thomas Wilson	17 August 1953 (aged 26)	
Great Britain	Barry Winch	17 April 1958 (aged 22)	Carshalton, England
Hungary	Ferenc Donáth	28 June 1954 (aged 26)	Nagykőrös, Hungary
Hungary	György Guczoghy	3 March 1962 (aged 18)	Budapest, Hungary
Hungary	Zoltán Kelemen	4 October 1958 (aged 21)	Budapest, Hungary
Hungary	Péter Kovács	28 September 1959 (aged 20)	Heves, Hungary
Hungary	Zoltán Magyar	13 December 1953 (aged 26)	Budapest, Hungary
Hungary	István Vámos	18 July 1958 (aged 22)	Budapest, Hungary
North Korea	Cho Hun	24 February 1958 (aged 22)	
North Korea	Han Gwang-song	17 October 1957 (aged 22)	
North Korea	Kang Gwang-song	5 January 1956 (aged 24)	
North Korea	Kim Gwang-jin	30 August 1956 (aged 23)	
North Korea	Li Su-gil	3 July 1964 (aged 16)	
North Korea	Song Sun-bong	2 October 1952 (aged 27)	
Poland	Krzysztof Potaczek	23 April 1958 (aged 22)	Nysa, Poland
Poland	Andrzej Szajna	30 September 1949 (aged 30)	Wrocław, Poland
Poland	Waldemar Woźniak	18 September 1954 (aged 25)	Warsaw, Poland
Romania	Romulus Bucuroiu	1 January 1956 (aged 24)	Vadu Pașii, Romania
Romania	Sorin Cepoi	13 September 1956 (aged 23)	Bucharest, Romania
Romania	Aurelian Georgescu	7 November 1958 (aged 21)	Bucharest, Romania
Romania	Dan Grecu	23 September 1950 (aged 29)	Bucharest, Romania
Romania	Nicolae Oprescu	1 March 1953 (aged 27)	Bucharest, Romania
Romania	Kurt Szilier	11 January 1957 (aged 23)	Lugoj, Romania
Soviet Union	Nikolai Andrianov	14 October 1952 (aged 27)	Vladimir, Russian SFSR
Soviet Union	Eduard Azaryan	11 April 1958 (aged 22)	Yerevan, Armenian SSR
Soviet Union	Aleksandr Dityatin	7 August 1957 (aged 22)	Saint Petersburg, Russian SFSR
Soviet Union	Bohdan Makuts	4 April 1960 (aged 20)	Lviv, Ukrainian SSR
Soviet Union	Vladimir Markelov	24 October 1957 (aged 22)	Chelyabinsk, Russian SFSR
Soviet Union	Aleksandr Tkachyov	4 November 1957 (aged 22)	Semiluki, Russian SFSR
Spain	Fernando Bertrand	8 January 1955 (aged 25)	Madrid, Spain
Spain	Gabriel Calvo	5 August 1955 (aged 24)	Madrid, Spain
Spain	José de la Casa	1 March 1957 (aged 23)	Jaén, Spain
