= Gymnastics at the Summer Olympics =

- IOC Code: GYM
- Governing body: FIG
- Events: 18 (men: 9; women: 9)

Summer Olympics
- 1896; 1900; 1904; 1908; 1912; 1920; 1924; 1928; 1932; 1936; 1948; 1952; 1956; 1960; 1964; 1968; 1972; 1976; 1980; 1984; 1988; 1992; 1996; 2000; 2004; 2008; 2012; 2016; 2020; 2024; 2028; 2032
- Medalists; men; women

Gymnastics events are being conducted at every Summer Olympic Games since the birth of the modern Olympic movement at the 1896 Summer Olympics in Athens. For 32 years, only men were allowed to compete. Beginning at the 1928 Summer Olympics in Amsterdam, women were allowed to compete in artistic gymnastics events as well. Rhythmic gymnastics events were introduced at the 1984 Summer Olympics in Los Angeles, and trampoline events were added at the 2000 Summer Olympics in Sydney.

== Summary ==
Games	Year	Events	Best Nation
1	1896	8	Germany (1)
2	1900	1	France (1)
3	1904	11	United States (1)
4	1908	2	Italy (1)
5	1912	4	Italy (2)
6			
7	1920	4	Italy (3)
8	1924	9	Switzerland (1)
9	1928	8	Switzerland (2)
10	1932	11	United States (2)
11	1936	9 + 4	Germany (2)
12			
13			
14	1948	9 + 4	Finland (1)
15	1952	15	Soviet Union (1)
16	1956	15	Soviet Union (2)
17	1960	14	Soviet Union (3)
18	1964	14	Japan (1)
19	1968	14	Japan (2)
20	1972	14	Soviet Union (4)
21	1976	14	Soviet Union (5)
22	1980	14	Soviet Union (6)
23	1984	15	United States (3)
24	1988	15	Soviet Union (7)
25	1992	15	Unified Team (1)
26	1996	16	Ukraine (1)
27	2000	18	Russia (1)
28	2004	18	Romania (1)
29	2008	18	China (1)
30	2012	18	China (2)
31	2016	18	United States (4)
32	2020	18	China (3)
33	2024	18	China (4)

== Artistic gymnastics ==
Artistic gymnastics at the Summer Olympics
- IOC Code: GAR
- Events: 14 (men: 8; women: 6)

Summer Olympics
- 1896; 1900; 1904; 1908; 1912; 1920; 1924; 1928; 1932; 1936; 1948; 1952; 1956; 1960; 1964; 1968; 1972; 1976; 1980; 1984; 1988; 1992; 1996; 2000; 2004; 2008; 2012; 2016; 2020; 2024; 2028; 2032
- Medalists; men; women

=== Men's events ===
Current programme
Event	96	00	04	08	12	20	24	28	32	36	48	52	56	60	64	68	72	76	80	84	88	92	96	00	04	08	12	16	20	24	Years
All-around, Team			X	X	X	X	X	X	X	X	X	X	X	X	X	X	X	X	X	X	X	X	X	X	X	X	X	X	X	X	28
All-around, Individual		X	X	X	X	X	X	X	X	X	X	X	X	X	X	X	X	X	X	X	X	X	X	X	X	X	X	X	X	X	29
Floor exercise	Not yet introduced								X	X	X	X	X	X	X	X	X	X	X	X	X	X	X	X	X	X	X	X	X	X	22
Horizontal bar	X		X				X	X	X	X	X	X	X	X	X	X	X	X	X	X	X	X	X	X	X	X	X	X	X	X	26
Parallel bars	X		X				X	X	X	X	X	X	X	X	X	X	X	X	X	X	X	X	X	X	X	X	X	X	X	X	26
Pommel horse	X		X				X	X	X	X	X	X	X	X	X	X	X	X	X	X	X	X	X	X	X	X	X	X	X	X	26
Rings	X		X				X	X	X	X	X	X	X	X	X	X	X	X	X	X	X	X	X	X	X	X	X	X	X	X	26
Vault	X		X				X	X	X	X	X	X	X	X	X	X	X	X	X	X	X	X	X	X	X	X	X	X	X	X	26
Events	5	1	7	2	2	2	7	7	8	8	8	8	8	8	8	8	8	8	8	8	8	8	8	8	8	8	8	8	8	8	

Past events

- Rope climbing: 1896, 1904, 1924, 1932
- Free system, Team: 1912, 1920
- Swedish system, Team: 1912, 1920
- Sidehorse vault: 1924

Only at the 1896 Summer Olympics:

- Horizontal bar, Team
- Parallel bars, Team

Only at the 1904 Summer Olympics:

- Club swinging
- Combined
- Triathlon

Only at the 1932 Summer Olympics:

- Indian clubs
- Tumbling

=== Women's events ===
Current programme
Event	96	00	04	08	12	20	24	28	32	36	48	52	56	60	64	68	72	76	80	84	88	92	96	00	04	08	12	16	20	24	Years
All-around, Team	Not yet introduced							X		X	X	X	X	X	X	X	X	X	X	X	X	X	X	X	X	X	X	X	X	X	22
All-around, Individual	Not yet introduced											X	X	X	X	X	X	X	X	X	X	X	X	X	X	X	X	X	X	X	19
Balance beam	Not yet introduced											X	X	X	X	X	X	X	X	X	X	X	X	X	X	X	X	X	X	X	19
Floor exercise	Not yet introduced											X	X	X	X	X	X	X	X	X	X	X	X	X	X	X	X	X	X	X	19
Uneven bars	Not yet introduced											X	X	X	X	X	X	X	X	X	X	X	X	X	X	X	X	X	X	X	19
Vault	Not yet introduced											X	X	X	X	X	X	X	X	X	X	X	X	X	X	X	X	X	X	X	19
Events	0	0	0	0	0	0	0	1	0	1	1	6	6	6	6	6	6	6	6	6	6	6	6	6	6	6	6	6	6	6	

Past events

- Team, portable apparatus: 1952, 1956

=== Medal table ===
(1896–2024)

Since 2021, the International Olympic Committee (IOC) has also listed the medals from the athletics triathlon event at the 1904 Summer Olympics as part of artistic gymnastics under the designation "Individual All-Around, Field Sports Men".

This event is not included in the medal table below, as this reflects a later IOC sporting classification. Some sources, such as Olympedia, include these medals in artistic gymnastics, resulting in the United States being credited with an additional gold, silver, and bronze medal in artistic gymnastics rather than in athletics.

Rank	Nation	Gold	Silver	Bronze	Total
1	Soviet Union	72	67	43	182
2	United States	42	45	42	129
3	Japan	36	34	37	107
4	China	31	26	21	78
5	Romania	25	20	27	72
6	Switzerland	15	19	13	47
7	Hungary	15	11	14	40
8	Italy	15	7	10	32
9	Germany	14	12	14	40
10	Czechoslovakia	12	13	10	35
11	Russia	10	15	19	44
12	Unified Team	9	5	4	18
13	Finland	8	5	12	25
14	East Germany	6	13	17	36
15	Ukraine	5	4	4	13
16	Greece	5	3	4	12
17	Yugoslavia	5	2	4	11
18	Sweden	5	2	1	8
19	France	3	10	9	22
20	Brazil	3	5	2	10
21	Great Britain	3	3	12	18
22	Netherlands	3	0	0	3
22	North Korea	3	0	0	3
24	South Korea	2	4	5	11
25	Bulgaria	2	2	6	10
26	ROC (ROC)	2	2	4	8
27	Spain	2	2	1	5
28	Philippines	2	0	0	2
29	Denmark	1	2	1	4
29	Norway	1	2	1	4
31	Poland	1	1	2	4
32	Belgium	1	1	1	3
32	United Team of Germany	1	1	1	3
34	Israel	1	1	0	2
34	Latvia	1	1	0	2
36	Algeria	1	0	0	1
36	Canada	1	0	0	1
36	Ireland	1	0	0	1
39	Croatia	0	2	0	2
40	Armenia	0	1	1	2
40	Chinese Taipei	0	1	1	2
42	Colombia	0	1	0	1
42	Kazakhstan	0	1	0	1
44	Belarus	0	0	4	4
45	Turkey	0	0	1	1
45	Uzbekistan	0	0	1	1
45	West Germany	0	0	1	1
Totals (47 entries)		365	346	350	1,061

=== Nations ===
Nations competing in artistic gymnastics, and the number of gymnasts (male and female) each nation brought to each Olympics, are shown below.

Nation	96	00	04	08	12	20	24	28	32	36	48	52	56	60	64	68	72	76	80	84	88	92	96	00	04	08	12	16	20	24	Years
Albania																													1		1
Algeria															1	1												2		1	4
Argentina											7	2		1	1							3	2	1	1		2	2	1		11
Armenia																							1				1	3	1	2	5
Australia													9	4	12	2	3	3	3	4	3	7	8	8	7	7	6	1	3	6	18
Austria										8	16	16	1	12													2	1	1	1	9
Azerbaijan																											1	2	2		3
Bangladesh																											1				1
Barbados																							1								1
Belarus																							14	12	3	7	2	2	1		6
Belgium		2		2		48					8	3		5	1	2		2			1	1		1	1	2	2	6	4	5	18
Bohemia		1		2	1																										3
Bolivia																									1						1
Brazil																			2	2	2	2		2	7	7	8	10	7	7	11
Bulgaria	1									7		16	6	12	8	11	12	12	12		12	12	8	6	2	2	2		1	2	19
Canada				2									2	3	4	10	9	9		12	12	9	6	8	12	8	6	6	5	10	18
Cayman Islands																													1		1
Chile																											2	2	2		3
China																				12	12	12	14	12	12	12	10	10	12	10	11
Chinese Taipei															8	4					1			1				1	5	2	7
Colombia																									1	2	2	2		2	5
Costa Rica																													1		1
Croatia																							1			2	2	2	2	2	6
Cuba											7	3	1	2	6	12	6	3	6					2	3			3	1		13
Cyprus																												1	1	1	3
Czech Republic																							2	2	1	2	2	1	2	1	8
Czechoslovakia						16	8	8		16	16	16	12	12	12	12	12	12	12		6	5									15
Denmark	1			24	49	45					8	7				3	1	1													9
Dominican Republic																											1			1	1
East Germany																12	12	12	12		12										5
Ecuador																3															1
Egypt						2					8	8		6	1									1		2	3	1	3	2	10
Finland				31	24		8	8	3	8	8	16	6	12	8	6	1									1	1	1			16
France	1	108		60	6	29	8	20		8	16	16	5	12	6	9	12	9	6	8	9	9	14	12	12	12	10	10	7	6	28
Georgia																							1	1	1	1					4
Germany	11	14	7	11	18							16	6	12	12							12	9	6	8	12	10	10	8	8	18
Great Britain	1	5		65	23	27	8	20		8	16	14	3	12	4	4	9	12	6	12	4	8	4	7	6	8	10	10	8	10	28
Greece	52																				1		8	4	4	2	3	3	1	1	9
Guatemala																					1	1					1	1			4
Haiti																														1	1
Hong Kong																											2		1	1	3
Hungary	2	2		6	17			20	4	16	16	16	8	12	12	12	12	12	12		12	12	10	3	2	2	3	2	1	4	26
Iceland																							1	1	1			1			4
India												2	3		6													1	1		5
Indonesia																														1	1
Iran															2															1	2
Ireland																							1				1	2	2	1	5
Israel														3				1		4	1	1			1	1	3	1	3	2	11
Italy		1		32	18	27	8	20	7	16	16	16	6	12	6	9	12	9		4	9	8	9	8	8	12	10	6	6	10	27
Jamaica																												1	1		2
Japan									3	8		5	12	12	12	12	12	12		12	12	9	13	8	8	12	10	10	11	9	20
Jordan																														1	1
Kazakhstan																							3	2	1		2		1	1	6
Latvia																							1	1	2		1				4
Lebanon																			2												1
Liechtenstein																	1														1
Lithuania																							1	1		1	2	1	1	1	7
Luxembourg					19		8	8		8	8	6	2	8	2											1					10
Malaysia																							1	1	1				2		4
Mexico									3		5			1		12	7	3	1	1	1	2		1	2	1	2	2	2	3	17
Monaco						2																						1			2
Mongolia															3	4			2												3
Morocco														6																	1
Namibia																								1							1
Netherlands				23				20			8	8		6			12	6				1			2	2	2	10	6	10	14
New Zealand															3		2							2				2	1	1	6
Nigeria																													1		1
North Korea																	6		12			9	1	3	8	2		2		1	9
Norway				30	46	26						11		1	2	6	7			1		1	1	1				1	2		14
Panama																												1		1	2
Peru																												1	1		2
Philippines															4	2								2					1	4	5
Poland										8		16	6	12	12	12	12	6	9				1	2		2	2	1	1		15
Portugal												9		4	1	2			1		2				1		2	1	1	1	11
Puerto Rico																						1	2	1	1	1	2				6
Romania										8		16	6	6	12		12	12	12	8	12	12	13	12	12	12	10	3	3	6	19
Russia					4																		14	12	12	12	10	10	12^{A}		7
Saar												6																			1
San Marino																			1	1											2
Singapore																											1		1		2
Slovakia																							1	1	1	1	2	1	1		7
Slovenia																						1		2		2	1	1		1	6
South Africa												3	2	1											1			1	2	1	7
South Korea														2	9	1				8	9	8	8	7	7	7	6	6	7	8	14
Soviet Union												16	12	12	12	12	12	12	12		12	12									10
Spain												1		12			4	6	6	9	9	8	8	12	12	8	6	3	9	8	16
Sri Lanka																													1		1
Sweden	1			38	24	24					8	15	8	12	9	6	1		1	2	1	1			1		1	1	2		19
Switzerland	1	2	1				8	8	8		8	8		6	6	6	12	6		12	2	6	4	1	3	3	2	6	5	6	24
Syria																														1	1
Tunisia																									1		1				2
Trinidad and Tobago																												1			1
Turkey				1																							1	2	5	5	5
Ukraine																							14	12	12	8	6	6	5	6	7
United States			111			4	8	8	19	16	16	16	12	12	12	12	12	12		12	12	12	14	12	12	12	10	10	11	10	25
Uzbekistan																							2	1	1	2	1	2	2	3	8
Venezuela																								1		2	1	1			4
Vietnam																										1	3	2	2		4
West Germany																12	12	6		12	8										5
Yemen																										1					1
Yugoslavia							8	8		16	16	16		9	6	7	12				1										10
No. of nations	9	8	3	14	12	11	9	11	6	16	19	30	21	33	33	30	28	23	20	19	28	28	36	43	42	41	54	60	60	54	97
No. of gymnasts	71	135	119	327	249	250	72	148	39	175	211	319	128	254	215	218	237	178	130	136	179	185	215	195	195	196	196	196	196	191	
Year	96	00	04	08	12	20	24	28	32	36	48	52	56	60	64	68	72	76	80	84	88	92	96	00	04	08	12	16	20	24	

== Rhythmic gymnastics ==
=== Events ===
Event	84	88	92	96	00	04	08	12	16	20	24	Years
Women's individual all-around	X	X	X	X	X	X	X	X	X	X	X	11
Women's group				X	X	X	X	X	X	X	X	8

=== Medal table ===
(1984–2024)

Rank	Nation	Gold	Silver	Bronze	Total
1	Russia	10	4	2	16
2	Bulgaria	1	3	2	6
3	Spain	1	2	0	3
4	China	1	1	0	2
4	Israel	1	1	0	2
6	Ukraine	1	0	4	5
7	Soviet Union	1	0	1	2
7	Unified Team	1	0	1	2
9	Canada	1	0	0	1
9	Germany	1	0	0	1
11	Belarus	0	4	3	7
12	ROC (ROC)	0	2	0	2
13	Italy	0	1	3	4
14	Romania	0	1	1	2
15	Greece	0	0	1	1
15	West Germany	0	0	1	1
Totals (16 entries)		19	19	19	57

=== Nations ===
Nations competing in rhythmic gymnastics and the number of gymnasts each nation brought to each Olympics, are shown below.

Nation	96	00	04	08	12	20	24	28	32	36	48	52	56	60	64	68	72	76	80	84	88	92	96	00	04	08	12	16	20	24	Years
Australia																				2				1	1	1	1	1	6	6	8
Austria																					1		2			1	1	1			5
Azerbaijan																									1	8	1	1	6	6	6
Belarus																							8	8	7	7	7	7	7		7
Belgium																				1	1	1	1								4
Brazil																				1		1		6	6	6		6	5	6	8
Bulgaria																					2	2	8	7	8	8	7	6	7	7	10
Canada																				2	2	2	1	1		1	6				7
Cape Verde																									1	1		1	1		4
China																				2	2	2	7	1	7	7	1	6	5	6	11
Cyprus																						2					1			1	3
Czech Republic																							2		1						2
Czechoslovakia																					2	2									2
Denmark																					1										1
Egypt																								1			1		6	6	4
Estonia																										1					1
Finland																						1	1	1				1			4
France																				1	1	2	7	7			1	1		6	8
Georgia																							1	1				1	1		4
Germany																						1	8	8	1		7	6		7	7
Great Britain																				2	1	2			1		1				5
Greece																					2	2	2	7	8	7	6	6			8
Hungary																					2	2	2	1					1	1	6
Independent Olympic Athletes																						2									1
Israel																				1	2			1	1	7	7	6	7	6	9
Italy																				2	2	2	8	7	7	6	7	6	7	7	11
Japan																				2	2	2	2	7	1	6	5	6	7		10
Kazakhstan																									1	1	1	1	1	1	5
Laos																														1	1
Lithuania																							1								1
Mexico																													1	5	2
New Zealand																				1	1										2
North Korea																						2									1
Norway																				1											1
Poland																					2	2	2	1	6	1	1				7
Portugal																				2	1										3
Romania																				2		2	2					1		1	5
Russia																							8	8	8	8	8	7	7^{A}		6
Slovenia																													1	1	2
South Africa																									1	1					2
South Korea																					2	2				1	1	1			5
Soviet Union																					2										1
Spain																				2	2	2	8	8	7	7	7	6		7	10
Sweden																				1											1
Switzerland																				2											1
Ukraine																							2	2	8	8	8	6	7	6	8
Unified Team																						2									1
United States																				2	2	2	7		1		1	6	7	1	9
Uzbekistan																											1	6	6	6	7
West Germany																				2	2										2
Yugoslavia																				2	2										2
No. of nations																				20	23	23	22	20	21	21	24	24	20	50	
No. of gymnasts																				33	39	42	90	84	84	95	95	96	96	94	
Year	96	00	04	08	12	20	24	28	32	36	48	52	56	60	64	68	72	76	80	84	88	92	96	00	04	08	12	16	20	24	

== Trampoline ==
=== Events ===
Event	00	04	08	12	16	20	24	Years
Women's individual	X	X	X	X	X	X	X	7
Men's individual	X	X	X	X	X	X	X	7

=== Medal table ===
(2000–2024)

Rank	Nation	Gold	Silver	Bronze	Total
1	China	4	5	7	16
2	Canada	2	3	3	8
3	Russia	2	2	0	4
4	Belarus	2	0	0	2
5	Great Britain	1	1	1	3
6	Ukraine	1	1	0	2
–	Individual Neutral Athletes	1	1	0	2
7	Germany	1	0	1	2
8	Australia	0	1	0	1
9	New Zealand	0	0	1	1
9	Uzbekistan	0	0	1	1
Totals (10 entries)		14	14	14	42

=== Nations ===
Nations competing in trampoline gymnastics and the number of gymnasts each nation brought to each Olympics, are shown below.

Nation	96	00	04	08	12	20	24	28	32	36	48	52	56	60	64	68	72	76	80	84	88	92	96	00	04	08	12	16	20	24	Years
Algeria																								1							1
Australia																								2	1	1	1	1	2		6
Austria																														1	1
Azerbaijan																														1	1
Belarus																								2	3	2	2	3	2		6
Brazil																												1		2	2
Canada																								2	3	3	3	2	2	2	7
China																									2	4	4	4	4	4	5
Colombia																													1	1	2
Czech Republic																								1		1	1				3
Denmark																									1	1	1				3
Egypt																													2	2	2
France																								1	1	1	1	2	2	2	7
Georgia																								1	1	1	1	1		1	6
Germany																								2	2	2	2	1		1	6
Great Britain																								2	2	1	1	3	2	3	7
Greece																									1						1
Individual Neutral Athletes																														1	1
Italy																									1	1	1				3
Japan																								2	1	3	3	3	4	2	7
Kazakhstan																												1		1	2
Mexico																													1		1
Netherlands																								1	2		1				3
New Zealand																												1	2	2	3
Portugal																									1	2	2	2	1	1	6
Russia																								2	4	4	3	3	4^{A}		5
Slovakia																									1						1
Spain																														2	1
Switzerland																								1	1						2
Ukraine																								2	2	2	2	1	1		6
United States																								1	1	2	2	2	2	2	7
Uzbekistan																								1	1	1	1	1			5
No. of nations																								16	20	17	18	17	18	28	
No. of gymnasts																								24	32	32	32	32	32	16	
Year	96	00	04	08	12	20	24	28	32	36	48	52	56	60	64	68	72	76	80	84	88	92	96	00	04	08	12	16	20	24	

== Overall medal table ==
(1896–2024)

Since 2021, the International Olympic Committee (IOC) has also listed the medals from the athletics triathlon event at the 1904 Summer Olympics as part of artistic gymnastics under the designation "Individual All-Around, Field Sports Men".

This event is not included in the medal table below, as this reflects a later IOC sporting classification. Some sources, such as Olympedia, include these medals in artistic gymnastics, resulting in the United States being credited with an additional gold, silver, and bronze medal in artistic gymnastics rather than in athletics.

- Last updated after the 2024 Summer Olympic Games

Rank	Nation	Gold	Silver	Bronze	Total
1	Soviet Union	73	67	44	184
2	United States	42	45	42	129
3	Japan	36	34	37	107
4	China	36	32	28	96
5	Romania	25	21	27	73
6	Russia	22	21	21	64
7	Germany	16	12	15	43
8	Switzerland	15	19	13	47
9	Hungary	15	11	14	40
10	Italy	15	8	14	37
11	Czechoslovakia	12	13	10	35
12	Unified Team	10	5	5	20
13	Finland	8	5	12	25
14	Ukraine	7	5	8	20
15	East Germany	6	13	17	36
16	Greece	5	3	5	13
17	Yugoslavia	5	2	4	11
18	Sweden	5	2	1	8
19	Great Britain	4	4	13	21
20	Canada	4	3	3	10
21	France	3	10	9	22
22	Bulgaria	3	5	8	16
23	Brazil	3	5	2	10
24	Spain	3	4	1	8
25	Netherlands	3	0	0	3
25	North Korea	3	0	0	3
27	Belarus	2	4	7	13
28	South Korea	2	4	5	11
29	ROC (ROC)	2	4	4	10
30	Israel	2	2	0	4
31	Philippines	2	0	0	2
32	Denmark	1	2	1	4
32	Norway	1	2	1	4
34	Poland	1	1	2	4
35	Belgium	1	1	1	3
35	United Team of Germany	1	1	1	3
37	Latvia	1	1	0	2
–	Individual Neutral Athletes	1	1	0	2
38	Algeria	1	0	0	1
38	Ireland	1	0	0	1
40	Croatia	0	2	0	2
41	Armenia	0	1	1	2
41	Chinese Taipei	0	1	1	2
43	Australia	0	1	0	1
43	Colombia	0	1	0	1
43	Kazakhstan	0	1	0	1
46	Uzbekistan	0	0	2	2
46	West Germany	0	0	2	2
48	New Zealand	0	0	1	1
48	Turkey	0	0	1	1
Totals (49 entries)		398	379	383	1,160

== See also ==
- Gymnastics at the Youth Olympic Games
- List of Olympic venues in gymnastics
- World Gymnastics Championships
- Gymnastics at the Alternate Olympics

== Notes ==
A.As ROC.
