= Vadu Pașii =

- Commune
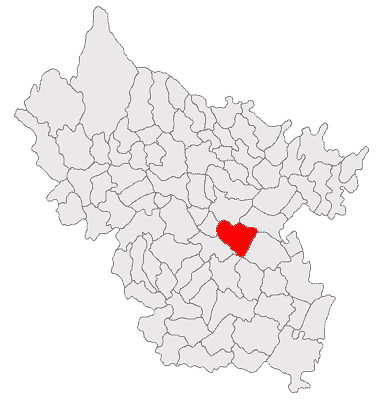
- Location in Buzău County

- Location in Romania
- Coordinates: 45°10′N 26°54′E
- Country: Romania
- County: Buzău
- Subdivisions: Băjani, Gura Câlnău, Focșănei, Scurtești, Stăncești, Vadu Pașii

Government
  - Mayor (2020–2024): Gheorghe Firon (PNL)
- Area: 83.2 km^{2} (32.1 sq mi)
- Elevation: 104 m (341 ft)
- Population (2021-12-01): 9,726
  - Density: 120/km^{2} (300/sq mi)
- Time zone: EET/EEST (UTC+2/+3)
- Postal code: 127650
- Area code: +(40) 238
- Vehicle reg.: BZ
- Website: comunavadupasii.ro

Vadu Pașii is a commune in Buzău County, Muntenia, Romania. It is composed of six villages: Băjani, Focșănei, Gura Câlnăului, Scurtești, Stăncești, and Vadu Pașii.

Historical population
Year	Pop.	±%
2002	9,165	—
2011	9,311	+1.6%
2021	9,726	+4.5%
Source: Census data

== Natives ==
- Romulus Bucuroiu (born 1956), gymnast
