= Katalin Donáth =

Hungarian pole vaulter

Personal information
- Nationality: Hungarian
- Born: 12 November 1979 (age 46) Budapest, Hungary

Sport
- Sport: Athletics
- Event: Pole vault

Katalin Donáth (born 12 November 1979) is a Hungarian athlete. She competed in the women's pole vault at the 2000 Summer Olympics.
