= Gymnastics at the Alternate Olympics =

Gymnastics at the Alternate Olympics may refer to:

- USGF International Invitational 1980 in gymnastics
- Gymnastics at the Friendship Games, as part of the 1984 Olympic boycott
