= Ferenc Donáth =

Hungarian gymnast (born 1954)

- Born: 28 June 1954 (age 72) Nagykőrös, People's Republic of Hungary
- Height: 1.65 m (5 ft 5 in)
- Relatives: Katalin Donáth (daughter)

Gymnastics career
- Discipline: Men's artistic gymnastics
- Country represented: Hungary
- Club: Testnevelési Főiskola Sport Egylet
Medal record
Men's artistic gymnastics
Representing Hungary
Olympic Games
| Bronze medal – third place | 1980 Moscow | Team |

Ferenc Donáth (born 28 June 1954) is a retired Hungarian gymnast. He competed at the 1976 and 1980 Summer Olympics in all artistic gymnastics events and finished in fourth and third place with the Hungarian team, respectively. Individually his best achievement was a fourth place in the rings in 1976. During his long gymnastics career Donáth took part in five world championships (1974–1983).
