= Gabriel Calvo =

Spanish gymnast (1955–2021)

- Full name: Gabriel Calvo Fernández
- Born: 5 August 1955 Madrid, Spain
- Died: 10 December 2021 (aged 66) Granada, Spain
- Height: 1.68 m (5 ft 6 in)

Gymnastics career
- Discipline: Men's artistic gymnastics
- Country represented: Spain

Gabriel Calvo Fernández (5 August 1955 – 10 December 2021) was a Spanish gymnast. He competed at the 1976 Summer Olympics and the 1980 Summer Olympics.

Calvo died in Granada on 10 December 2021, at the age of 66.
