= Rudolf Babiak =

Slovak gymnast (1956–2020)

- Born: 12 April 1956 Banská Bystrica, Czechoslovakia
- Died: 16 July 2020 (aged 64) Banská Bystrica, Slovakia
- Height: 1.57 m (5 ft 2 in)

Gymnastics career
- Discipline: Men's artistic gymnastics
- Country represented: Czechoslovakia

Rudolf Babiak (12 April 1956 – 16 July 2020) was a Slovak gymnast. He competed in eight events at the 1980 Summer Olympics. Babiak died on 16 July 2020.
