= Aurelian Georgescu =

Romanian gymnast

- Born: 7 November 1958 (age 67) Bucharest, Romanian People's Republic
- Height: 1.74 m (5 ft 9 in)

Gymnastics career
- Discipline: Men's artistic gymnastics
- Country represented: Romania

Aurelian Georgescu (born 7 November 1958) is a Romanian gymnast. He competed in eight events at the 1980 Summer Olympics.
