= Marc Touchais =

French gymnast

- Born: 21 March 1958 (age 68)
- Height: 1.65 m (5 ft 5 in)

Gymnastics career
- Discipline: Men's artistic gymnastics
- Country represented: France

Marc Touchais (born 21 March 1958) is a French gymnast. He competed in eight events at the 1980 Summer Olympics.
