= Barry Winch =

British gymnast (born 1958)

- Born: 17 April 1958 (age 68) Carshalton, England

Gymnastics career
- Discipline: Men's artistic gymnastics
- Country represented: (United Kingdom) Great Britain

Barry Winch (born 17 April 1958) is a British gymnast. He competed at the 1980 Summer Olympics and the 1984 Summer Olympics.
