= Miguel Arroyo (gymnast) =

Cuban gymnast (born 1962)

- Full name: Miguel Arroyo Pérez
- Born: 17 June 1962 (age 64)

Gymnastics career
- Discipline: Men's artistic gymnastics
- Country represented: Cuba

Miguel Arroyo Pérez (born 17 June 1962) is a Cuban gymnast. He competed in eight events at the 1980 Summer Olympics.
