= Ognyan Bangiev =

Bulgarian gymnast (born 1956)

- Огнян Бангиев
- Born: 15 June 1956 (age 70)

Gymnastics career
- Discipline: Men's artistic gymnastics
- Country represented: Bulgaria

Ognyan Bangiev (Bulgarian: Огнян Бангиев) (born 15 June 1956) is a Bulgarian gymnast. He competed in eight events at the 1980 Summer Olympics.
