= Jan Migdau =

Czech gymnast

- Born: 17 June 1958 (age 68) Čáslav, Czechoslovakia

Gymnastics career
- Discipline: Men's artistic gymnastics
- Country represented: Czechoslovakia

Jan Migdau (born 17 June 1958) is a Czech gymnast. He competed in eight events at the 1980 Summer Olympics.
