= Ralf-Peter Hemmann =

East German gymnast

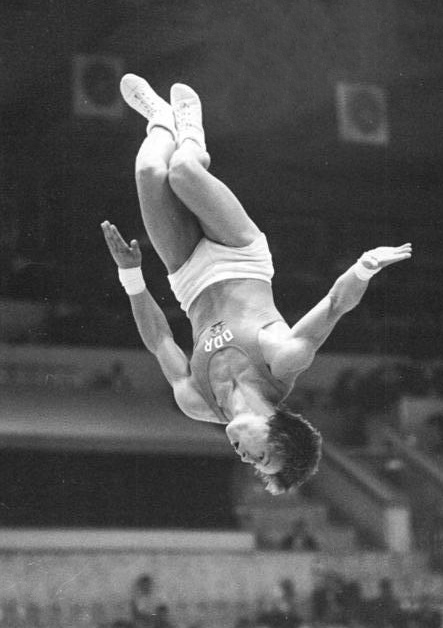
- Hemmann in 1980

Personal information
- Born: 8 December 1958 (age 67) Dresden, East Germany
- Height: 1.74 m (5 ft 9 in)

Gymnastics career
- Discipline: Men's artistic gymnastics
- Country represented: East Germany
- Club: SC DHfK, Leipzig
- Retired: 1982
Medal record
Representing East Germany
Olympic Games
Silver medal – second place	1980 Moscow	Team
World Championships
Gold medal – first place	1981 Moscow	Vault
Bronze medal – third place	1978 Strasbourg	Team

Ralf-Peter Hemmann (born 8 December 1958) is a retired German gymnast. He competed at the 1980 Summer Olympics in all artistic gymnastics events and won a silver medal with the East German team. Individually he finished fourth in the vault and horizontal bar. He won a team bronze medal at the world championships in 1978 and an individual gold in the vault in 1981.

After his vault gold medal at the 1981 World Artistic Gymnastics Championships, he planned to continue his career after healing from an injury. However, the next spring, at the age of 22, he was suddenly told he would no longer be allowed to train after Soviet officials informed the GDR that he had tested positive for anabolic steroids. The result was not officially reported to the International Gymnastics Federation, and Hemmann kept his medal. Hemmann said he was pressured to say that he had intentionally doped; the federation doctor insisted that she did not administer any banned substances to him as part of the East German doping program.
