= Rumen Petkov (gymnast) =

Bulgarian gymnast (born 1959)

- Румен Петков
- Born: 1 September 1959 (age 67)
- Relatives: Plamen Petkov (brother)

Gymnastics career
- Discipline: Men's artistic gymnastics
- Country represented: Bulgaria

Rumen Petkov (Bulgarian: Румен Петков) (born 1 September 1959) is a Bulgarian gymnast. He competed in eight events at the 1980 Summer Olympics. His twin brother Plamen was also on the Bulgarian gymnastics team at the same Games.
