= Zoltán Kelemen (gymnast) =

Hungarian gymnast (born 1958)

- Born: 4 October 1958 (age 67) Budapest, Hungarian People's Republic
- Height: 1.68 m (5 ft 6 in)

Gymnastics career
- Discipline: Men's artistic gymnastics
- Country represented: Hungary
- Club: Budapesti Honvéd Sportegyesület
Medal record
Men's artistic gymnastics
Representing Hungary
Olympic Games
Bronze medal – third place	1980 Moscow	Team

Zoltán Kelemen (born 4 October 1958) is a retired Hungarian gymnast. He competed at the 1980 Summer Olympics in all artistic gymnastics events and won a bronze medal with the Hungarian team. Individually his best achievement was 19th place in the pommel horse.
