= Péter Kovács (gymnast) =

Hungarian gymnast (1959–2024)

- Born: 28 September 1959 Heves, People's Republic of Hungary
- Died: 22 June 2024 (aged 64)
- Height: 1.68 m (5 ft 6 in)

Gymnastics career
- Discipline: Men's artistic gymnastics
- Country represented: Hungary
- Club: Dunaújvárosi Kohász Sportegyesület
- Eponymous skills: Kovács (horizontal bar)
- Retired: 1984
Medal record
Men's artistic gymnastics
Representing Hungary
Olympic Games
Bronze medal – third place	1980 Moscow	Team
European Championships
Silver medal – second place	1979 Essen	Horizontal bar

Péter Kovács (28 September 1959 – 22 June 2024) was a Hungarian gymnast. He competed at the 1980 Summer Olympics in all artistic gymnastics events and won a bronze medal with the Hungarian team. Individually his best achievement was fifth place in the floor exercise. An element on horizontal bar is named after Kovács. He died on 22 June 2024, at the age of 64.

== Eponymous skill ==
Apparatus	Name	Description	Difficulty	Added to Code of Points
Horizontal bar	Kovacs	Double salto backward over the bar	D	late 1970s
