= Kurt Szilier =

Romanian gymnast

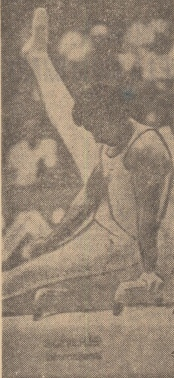
- Szilier at the 1981 Summer Universiade

Personal information
- Born: 11 January 1957 (age 69) Lugoj, Romanian People's Republic
- Height: 1.72 m (5 ft 8 in)

Gymnastics career
- Discipline: Men's artistic gymnastics
- Country represented: West Germany
- Former countries represented: Romania
Medal record
Men's artistic gymnastics
Representing Romania
European Championships
| Silver medal – second place | 1981 Rome | Pommel horse |

Kurt Szilier (born 11 January 1957) is a Romanian gymnast. He competed in eight events at the 1980 Summer Olympics. Win in Individual all-around at 1981 Summer Universiade.
