= Michel Boutard =

French gymnast

- Born: 21 April 1956 (age 70)
- Height: 1.69 m (5 ft 7 in)

Gymnastics career
- Discipline: Men's artistic gymnastics
- Country represented: France
- Club: Orléans
Medal record
Men's artistic gymnastics
Representing France
European Championships
Silver medal – second place	1981 Rome	Pommel horse
Bronze medal – third place	1979 Essen	Pommel horse

Michel Boutard (born 21 April 1956) is a French gymnast. He competed at the 1976 Summer Olympics, the 1980 Summer Olympics and the 1984 Summer Olympics.
