= José de la Casa =

Spanish gymnast

- Full name: Juan José de la Casa García
- Born: 1 March 1957 (age 69) Jaén, Spain
- Height: 1.70 m (5 ft 7 in)

Gymnastics career
- Discipline: Men's artistic gymnastics
- Country represented: Spain

Juan José de la Casa García (born 1 March 1957) is a Spanish gymnast. He competed at the 1976 Summer Olympics and the 1980 Summer Olympics.
