= Song Sun-bong =

North Korean gymnast

- 송순봉
- Born: 2 October 1952 (age 73)
- Height: 1.61 m (5 ft 3 in)

Gymnastics career
- Discipline: Men's artistic gymnastics
- Country represented: North Korea

Song Sun-bong (Korean: 송순봉,born 2 October 1952) is a North Korean gymnast. He competed in eight events at the 1980 Summer Olympics. He became an instructor at the Kim Hyong Jik University of Education and worked as coach for the north korean team in the 1990s.
