= Willy Moy =

French gymnast

- Full name: Guillaume Othon Jean Moy
- Born: 13 June 1956 Forbach, France
- Died: 5 May 2015 (aged 58) Saint-Avold, France
- Height: 1.80 m (5 ft 11 in)

Gymnastics career
- Discipline: Men's artistic gymnastics
- Country represented: France
- Gym: Forbach
Medal record
Men's artistic gymnastics
Representing France
Mediterranean Games
| Gold medal – first place | 1975 Algiers | Team |
| Gold medal – first place | 1975 Algiers | Rings |
| Gold medal – first place | 1979 Split | Team |
| Gold medal – first place | 1979 Split | Rings |
| Silver medal – second place | 1979 Split | All-around |
| Silver medal – second place | 1979 Split | Floor |
| Silver medal – second place | 1979 Split | Pommel horse |
| Bronze medal – third place | 1975 Algiers | Vault |

Guillaume Othon Jean "Willy" Moy (13 June 1956 – 5 May 2015) was a French gymnast. He competed at the 1976 Summer Olympics and the 1980 Summer Olympics.
