= Miloslav Kučeřík =

Czech gymnast

- Born: 22 June 1959 (age 67) Vsetín, Czechoslovakia

Gymnastics career
- Discipline: Men's artistic gymnastics
- Country represented: Czechoslovakia

Miloslav Kučeřík (born 22 June 1959) is a Czech gymnast. He competed in eight events at the 1980 Summer Olympics.
