= Fernando Bertrand =

Spanish gymnast

- Full name: Fernando Bertrand García-Taheño
- Born: 8 January 1955 (age 71) Madrid, Spain
- Height: 1.70 m (5 ft 7 in)

Gymnastics career
- Discipline: Men's artistic gymnastics
- Country represented: Spain

Fernando Bertrand García-Taheño (born 8 January 1955) is a Spanish gymnast. He competed at the 1976 Summer Olympics and the 1980 Summer Olympics.
