= Keith Langley =

British gymnast (born 1961)

- Born: 3 June 1961 (age 65) Aldershot, England

Gymnastics career
- Discipline: Men's artistic gymnastics
- Country represented: (United Kingdom) Great Britain

Keith Langley (born 3 June 1961) is a British gymnast. He competed at the 1980 Summer Olympics and the 1984 Summer Olympics.
