= Enrique Bravo López =

Cuban gymnast (born 1955)

Enrique Bravo
- Full name: Enrique Bravo López
- Born: 14 January 1955 (age 71)

Gymnastics career
- Discipline: Men's artistic gymnastics
- Country represented: Cuba

Enrique Bravo López (born 14 January 1955) is a Cuban gymnast. He competed in eight events at the 1980 Summer Olympics.
