= Joël Suty =

French gymnast (born 1960)

- Born: 4 July 1960 (age 66)
- Height: 1.67 m (5 ft 6 in)

Gymnastics career
- Discipline: Men's artistic gymnastics
- Country represented: France
- Club: CN Beaune, La Beaunoise
Medal record
Men's artistic gymnastics
Representing France
Mediterranean Games
Gold medal – first place	1979 Split	Team
Gold medal – first place	1979 Split	Horizontal bar

Joël Suty (born 4 July 1960) is a French gymnast. He competed at the 1980 Summer Olympics and the 1984 Summer Olympics. He also competed in the men's 10 metre platform diving at the 1976 Summer Olympics.
