= Krzysztof Potaczek =

Polish gymnast

- Born: 23 April 1958 (age 68) Nysa, Polish People's Republic
- Height: 1.76 m (5 ft 9 in)

Gymnastics career
- Discipline: Men's artistic gymnastics
- Country represented: Poland
- Club: Zawisza Bydgoszcz

Krzysztof Potaczek (born 23 April 1958) is a Polish gymnast. He competed in seven events at the 1980 Summer Olympics.
