= Mario Castro (gymnast) =

Cuban gymnast (born 1962)

- Full name: Mario Castro Martínez
- Born: 8 January 1962 (age 64)

Gymnastics career
- Discipline: Men's artistic gymnastics
- Country represented: Cuba

Mario Castro Martínez (born 8 January 1962) is a Cuban gymnast. He competed in eight events at the 1980 Summer Olympics.
