= Ri Su-gil =

North Korean gymnast (born 1964)

- Born: 3 July 1964 (age 62)
- Height: 1.56 m (5 ft 1 in)

Gymnastics career
- Discipline: Men's artistic gymnastics
- Country represented: North Korea
Medal record
Representing North Korea
Asian Games
| Gold medal – first place | 1982 New Delhi | Rings |
| Bronze medal – third place | 1982 New Delhi | Team |

Ri Su-gil (born 3 July 1964) is a North Korean gymnast. He competed in eight events at the 1980 Summer Olympics.
