= Plamen Petkov =

Bulgarian gymnast (born 1959)

- Пламен Петков
- Born: 1 September 1959 (age 67)
- Relatives: Rumen Petkov (brother)

Gymnastics career
- Discipline: Men's artistic gymnastics
- Country represented: Bulgaria
Medal record
Representing Bulgaria
European Championships
Gold medal – first place	1983 Varna	Floor exercise
Gold medal – first place	1983 Varna	Rings

Plamen Petkov (Bulgarian: Пламен Петков) (born 1 September 1959) is a Bulgarian gymnast. He competed in eight events at the 1980 Summer Olympics. His twin brother Rumen was also on the Bulgarian gymnastics team at the same Games.
