= Lutz Hoffmann =

East German gymnast

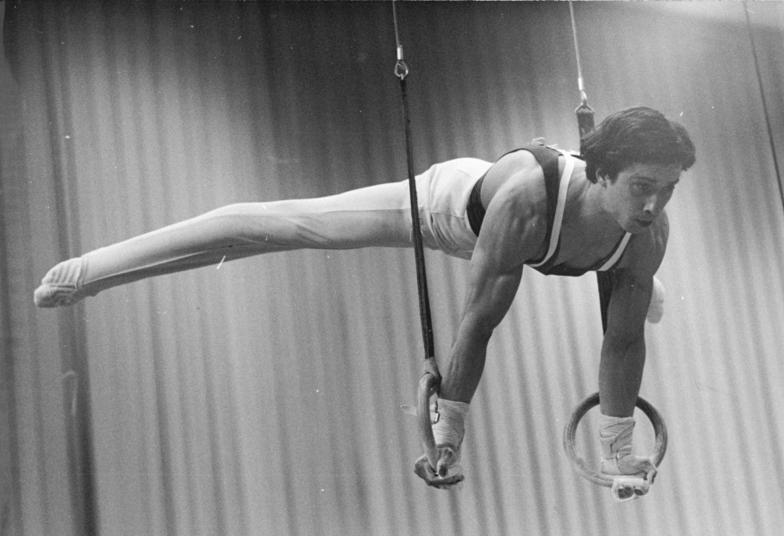
- Hoffmann in 1980

Personal information
- Born: 30 January 1959 Weißenfels, Bezirk Halle, East Germany
- Died: 5 December 1997 (aged 38) Bad Sachsa, Lower Saxony, Germany
- Height: 1.53 m (5 ft 0 in)
- Relatives: Ulf Hoffmann (brother)

Gymnastics career
- Discipline: Men's artistic gymnastics
- Country represented: East Germany
- Club: SC Synamo Berlin
Medal record
Representing East Germany
Olympic Games
Silver medal – second place	1980 Moscow	Team
European Championships
Bronze medal – third place	1981 Rome	Parallel bars

Lutz Hoffmann (30 January 1959 – 5 December 1997) was an East German gymnast and Olympic silver medalist.

== Early life ==
He began gymnastics training at the age of five. Beginning in 1976, he trained with the SC Dynamo Berlin. His younger brother Ulf Hoffmann was likewise an Olympic gymnast. In their youth, they shared a boarding school room during their time with SC Synamo Berlin.

== Gymnastics career ==
In 1979, Hoffmann became GDR champion in the floor exercise and finished second in the vault. At the world championships in the same year, his team finished fourth. Next year they won a silver medal at the 1980 Summer Olympics in Moscow. At those games, Hoffmann was seventh all-around and sixth on the floor. He won a bronze medal in the parallel bars at the 1981 European Championships.

== Later life and death ==
After retiring from competitions, he worked as a gymnastics coach and then became a teacher in Bad Sachsa, Germany, where he committed suicide in 1997.
