= Alexander Dityatin =

Russian gymnast (1957–2025)

- Александр Дитятин
- Born: 7 August 1957 Leningrad, Russian SFSR, USSR
- Died: October 2025 (aged 68)

Gymnastics career
- Discipline: Men's artistic gymnastics
- Country represented: Soviet Union
- Retired: Yes
Medal record
Olympic Games
Gold medal – first place	1980 Moscow	Team
Gold medal – first place	1980 Moscow	All-around
Gold medal – first place	1980 Moscow	Rings
Silver medal – second place	1976 Montreal	Team
Silver medal – second place	1976 Montreal	Rings
Silver medal – second place	1980 Moscow	Pommel horse
Silver medal – second place	1980 Moscow	Vault
Silver medal – second place	1980 Moscow	Parallel bars
Silver medal – second place	1980 Moscow	Horizontal bar
Bronze medal – third place	1980 Moscow	Floor Exercise
World Championships
Gold medal – first place	1979 Ft. Worth	Team competition
Gold medal – first place	1979 Ft. Worth	All-around
Gold medal – first place	1979 Ft. Worth	Vault
Gold medal – first place	1979 Ft. Worth	Still rings
Gold medal – first place	1981 Moscow	Team competition
Gold medal – first place	1981 Moscow	Parallel bars
Gold medal – first place	1981 Moscow	Still rings
Silver medal – second place	1978 Strasbourg	Team competition
Silver medal – second place	1978 Strasbourg	Still rings
Bronze medal – third place	1978 Strasbourg	All-around
Bronze medal – third place	1978 Strasbourg	Floor exercise
Bronze medal – third place	1979 Ft. Worth	Horizontal bar
European Championships
Gold medal – first place	1979 Essen	Pommel horse
Gold medal – first place	1979 Essen	Still rings
Silver medal – second place	1975 Bern	Parallel bars
Silver medal – second place	1979 Essen	Parallel bars
Bronze medal – third place	1975 Bern	All-around
Bronze medal – third place	1975 Bern	Still rings

Alexander Nikolaevich Dityatin (Russian: Александр Николаевич Дитятин; 7 August 1957 – 14 October 2025) was a Russian gymnast, three-time Olympic champion and Honoured Master of Sports of the USSR. Winning eight medals at the 1980 Summer Olympics, he set the record for achieving the most medals of any type at a single Olympic Games. The American swimmer Michael Phelps twice equalled this record, at Athens 2004 and Beijing 2008. Dityatin competed for the Leningrad Dinamo sports society.

== Biography ==
Dityatin was born in Leningrad (St. Petersburg) on 7 August 1957. At the age of 15, he was given special dispensation to take part in the senior USSR championships. Two years later, he won the Spartakiades in the USSR, an event which was followed by a growth spurt in which he grew 12 cm in one year. At the age of 18, as part of the national team, he came third in the European championships, which were won outright by compatriot Nikolai Andrianov. For twenty years he trained under the Honored Coach of the USSR Anatoly Yarmovsky.

Dityatin's first Olympic success was at the 1976 Summer Olympics in Montreal, where he won two silver medals: on the rings and in the team competition. At the 1980 Summer Olympics, after years of being second to teammate Andrianov, 22-year-old Dityatin won a record eight medals in the Moscow Games where he won the all-around title and seven more medals, including two golds to add to his historic achievement of the perfect 10, a feat which had only been recorded by Romania's Nadia Comăneci and the Soviet Union's Nellie Kim in the Olympic Games by then. Shortly after the 1980 Olympics, Dityatin was seriously injured while training, which ended his career. He was the most successful athlete at the 1980 Summer Olympics. As of 2017, he is the only athlete who won a medal in each of the eight gymnastics events at one Olympics.

To add more to the impressiveness of his performance at the 1980 Olympics, not only did he medal in every event, which, of course, suggests an excellent standard of performance throughout the entire competition, but throughout his 24 performances (the maximum # of performances a male gymnast can have throughout an Olympics), he scored no lower than a 9.800 out of 10 throughout those 24 performances, and on 18 of those performances, his score was at least a 9.900.

Dityatin is the first athlete in Olympic history to win eight medals in one Olympic Games. He was also the first male gymnast to be awarded a perfect score of ten in an Olympic competition, a feat he accomplished in the long horse vault.

Dityatin graduated from Leningrad Lesgaft Institute of Physical Education. He was awarded Order of the Badge of Honor (1976), and Order of Lenin (1980, for guarding the State Border of the USSR). Between 1980 and 1995, Dityatin was the head coach of a sports team from Leningrad (Leningrad OKPP).

In 2004, Dityatin was inducted into the International Gymnastics Hall of Fame.

The annual Alexander Dityatin Cup competition is held in his honor in Russia.

Dityatin died in October 2025, at the age of 68. The cause of his death was acute heart failure.

== Achievements (non-Olympic) ==
Year	Event	AA	Team	FX	PH	RG	VT	PB	HB
1975	European Championships	3rd				3rd		2nd	
1975	World Cup	3rd							
1975	USSR Championships	1st			1st			2nd	2nd
1975	USSR Cup	1st							
1976	USSR Championships				1st	3rd			
1976	USSR Cup	3rd							
1977	USSR Championships						3rd	2nd	
1977	University Games						2nd		
1977	USSR Cup	3rd							
1978	World Championships	3rd	2nd	3rd		2nd			
1978	World Cup	1st		3rd	2nd	1st	3rd		3rd
1978	USSR Championships					1st		2nd	3rd
1979	World Championships	1st	1st			1st	1st		3rd
1979	World Cup	1st				1st	2nd	2nd	2nd
1979	European Championships				1st	1st		2nd	
1979	USSR Championships	1st		3rd	2nd	1st	2nd	2nd	3rd
1980	USSR Cup	1st							
1981	World Championships		1st			1st		1st	

== See also ==
- List of multiple Summer Olympic medalists
- List of multiple Olympic medalists at a single Games
- Perfect 10 (gymnastics)
