= Nicolae Oprescu =

Romanian gymnast

- Born: 1 March 1953 (age 73) Bucharest, Romanian People's Republic
- Height: 1.71 m (5 ft 7 in)

Gymnastics career
- Discipline: Men's artistic gymnastics
- Country represented: Romania
- Club: CS Dinamo București

Nicolae Oprescu (born 1 March 1953) is a Romanian gymnast. He competed at the 1972 Summer Olympics, the 1976 Summer Olympics and the 1980 Summer Olympics.
