= Jozef Konečný =

Slovak gymnast (born 1953)

- Born: 2 December 1953 (age 72) Bratislava, Czechoslovakia
- Height: 1.75 m (5 ft 9 in)

Gymnastics career
- Discipline: Men's artistic gymnastics
- Country represented: Czechoslovakia
- Club: Slávia Bratislava
Medal record
Men's artistic gymnastics
Representing Czechoslovakia
European Championships
Silver medal – second place	1979 Essen	Vault

Jozef Konečný (born 2 December 1953) is a Slovak gymnast. He competed in eight events at the 1980 Summer Olympics.
