= Lindsay Nylund =

Australian gymnast

- Born: 30 April 1958 (age 68)
- Height: 172 cm (5 ft 8 in)

Gymnastics career
- Discipline: Men's artistic gymnastics
- Country represented: Australia
Medal record
Men's artistic gymnastics
Representing Australia
Commonwealth Games
Silver medal – second place	1978 Edmonton	All-around
Bronze medal – third place	1978 Edmonton	Team

Lindsay Nylund (born 30 April 1958) is an Australian gymnast. He competed in eight events at the 1980 Summer Olympics.
