= Dancho Yordanov =

Bulgarian gymnast (born 1958)

- Данчо Йорданов
- Born: 23 November 1958 (age 67)

Gymnastics career
- Discipline: Men's artistic gymnastics
- Country represented: Bulgaria

Dancho Yordanov (Bulgarian: Данчо Йорданов) (born 23 November 1958) is a Bulgarian gymnast. He competed in eight events at the 1980 Summer Olympics.
