= Jan Zoulík =

Czech gymnast

- Born: 2 February 1957 (age 69) Dolní Počernice, Czechoslovakia

Gymnastics career
- Discipline: Men's artistic gymnastics
- Country represented: Czechoslovakia

Jan Zoulík (born 2 February 1957) is a Czech gymnast. He competed at the 1976 Summer Olympics and the 1980 Summer Olympics.
