= Lutz Mack =

East German gymnast

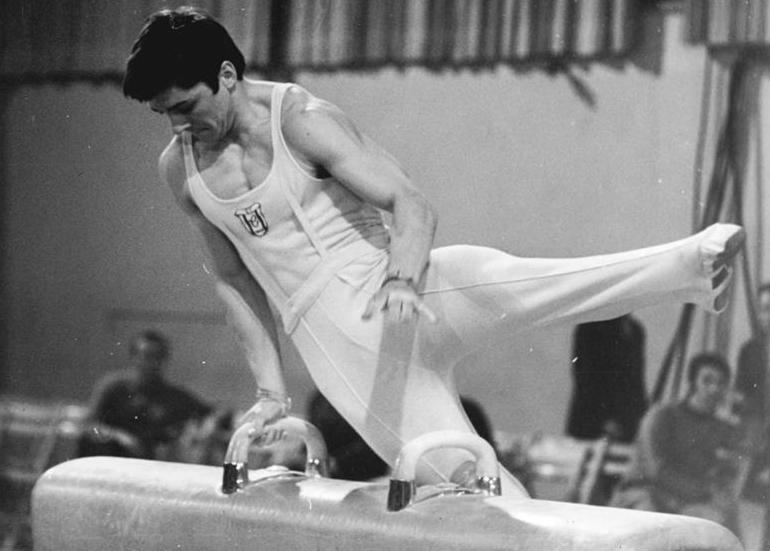
- Mack in 1972

Personal information
- Born: 9 October 1952 (age 74) Delitzsch, Bezirk Leipzig, East Germany
- Height: 1.68 m (5 ft 6 in)

Gymnastics career
- Discipline: Men's artistic gymnastics
- Country represented: East Germany
- Club: SV Halle
Medal record
Representing East Germany
Olympic Games
Bronze medal – third place	1976 Montreal	Team
Silver medal – second place	1980 Moscow	Team
World Championships
Bronze medal – third place	1974 Varna	Team
Bronze medal – third place	1978 Strasbourg	Team
European Championships
Bronze medal – third place	1979 Essen	Rings
Bronze medal – third place	1979 Essen	Floor

Lutz Mack (born 9 October 1952) is a German former gymnast. He competed at the 1976 and 1980 Summer Olympics in all artistic gymnastics events and won a bronze and a silver medal with the East German team, respectively. His best individual result was ninth place in the rings in 1976. He won four bronze medals at the 1974 and 1978 World Championships and 1979 European Championships.
