= Andreas Bronst =

German gymnast

- Born: 12 November 1957 (age 68) Rochlitz, East Germany
- Height: 1.71 m (5 ft 7 in)

Gymnastics career
- Discipline: Men's artistic gymnastics
- Country represented: East Germany
Medal record
Men's artistic gymnastics
Representing East Germany
Olympic Games
Silver medal – second place	1980 Moscow	Team

Andreas Bronst (born 12 November 1957 in Rochlitz) is a German former gymnast who competed representing East Germany in the 1980 Summer Olympics, for which he was awarded the Patriotic Order of Merit.
