= Yves Bouquel =

French gymnast

- Born: 10 March 1955 (age 71)
- Height: 1.66 m (5 ft 5 in)

Gymnastics career
- Discipline: Men's artistic gymnastics
- Country represented: France
Medal record
Men's artistic gymnastics
Representing France
Mediterranean Games
Gold medal – first place	1979 Split	Team

Yves Bouquel (born 10 March 1955) is a French gymnast. He competed in eight events at the 1980 Summer Olympics.
