= Waldemar Woźniak =

Polish gymnast

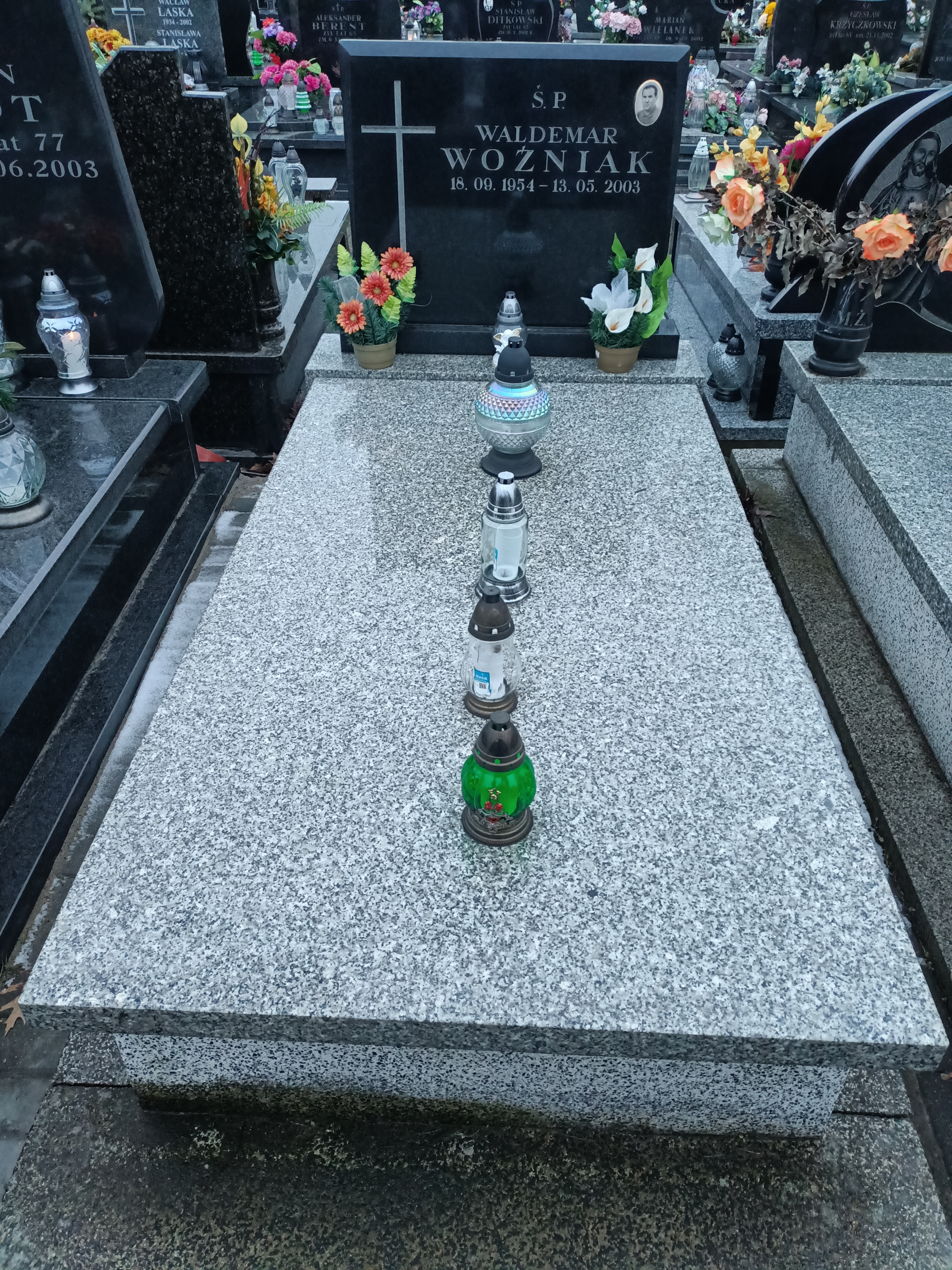
- Woźniak's tombstone

Personal information
- Born: 18 September 1954 Warsaw, Polish People's Republic
- Died: 18 May 2003 (aged 48)
- Height: 1.65 m (5 ft 5 in)

Gymnastics career
- Discipline: Men's artistic gymnastics
- Country represented: Poland
- Club: Legia Warsaw

Waldemar Woźniak (18 September 1954 – 18 May 2003) was a Polish gymnast. He competed in seven events at the 1980 Summer Olympics.
