= Romulus Bucuroiu =

Romanian gymnast

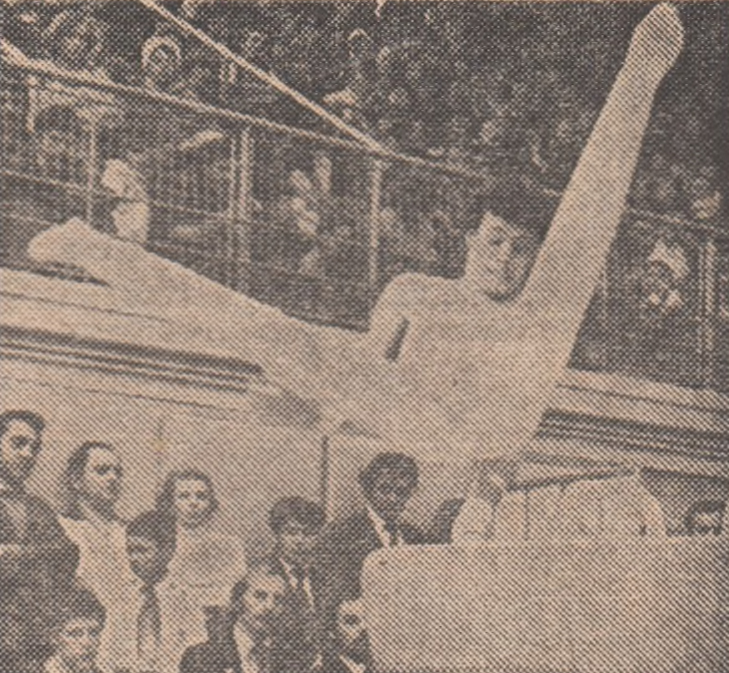
- Born: 1 January 1956 (age 70) Stăncești, Vadu Pașii, Romanian People's Republic
- Height: 1.64 m (5 ft 5 in)

Gymnastics career
- Discipline: Men's artistic gymnastics
- Country represented: Romania

Romulus Bucuroiu (born 1 January 1956) is a Romanian gymnast. He competed in eight events at the 1980 Summer Olympics.
