= Tommy Wilson (gymnast) =

British gymnast (born 1953)

- Full name: Thomas Arthur Wilson
- Born: 17 August 1953 (age 73)

Gymnastics career
- Discipline: Men's artistic gymnastics
- Country represented: (United Kingdom) Great Britain; England
Medal record
Men's artistic gymnastics
Representing England
Commonwealth Games
Silver medal – second place	1978 Edmonton	Team

Thomas Arthur Wilson (born 17 August 1953) is a British gymnast. He competed at the 1976 Summer Olympics and the 1980 Summer Olympics.
