= Eduard Azaryan =

Soviet gymnast (born 1958)

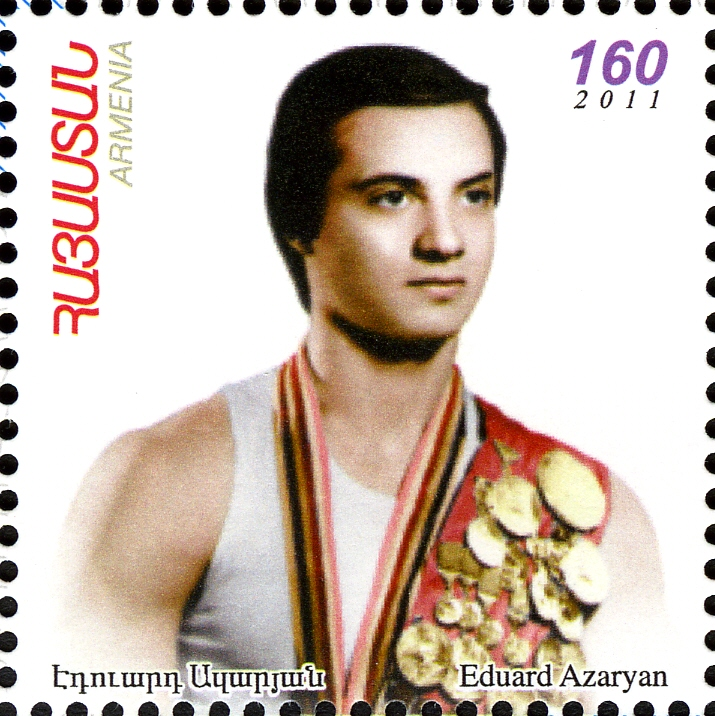

Personal information
- Born: 11 April 1958 (age 68) Yerevan, Armenian SSR, Soviet Union
- Height: 1.75 m (5 ft 9 in)
- Relatives: Albert Azaryan (father)

Gymnastics career
- Discipline: Men's artistic gymnastics
- Country represented: Soviet Union
- Club: SKA Yerevan
Medal record
Olympic Games
Gold medal – first place	1980 Moscow	Team competition
World Championships
Silver medal – second place	1978 Strasbourg	Team competition

Eduard Azaryan (Armenian: Էդուարդ Ազարյան, born 11 April 1958) is a former Soviet Armenian artistic gymnast. He is an Olympic Champion and four-time Soviet Champion. Azaryan was awarded the Honoured Master of Sport of the USSR title in 1980. He is the son of Albert Azaryan.

== Biography ==
Eduard started gymnastics in his early childhood under the guidance of his father, a three-time Olympic champion Albert Azaryan. In 1978, Eduard Azaryan became USSR champion in the team all-around and joined the USSR national gymnastics team. In the same year, Azaryan won a bronze medal at the World Cup in the individual all-around and a silver medal at the 1978 World Artistic Gymnastics Championships in the team all-around.

Azaryan competed at the 1980 Summer Olympics in every artistic gymnastics event. He won a gold medal in the team all-around.
