= João Luiz Ribeiro =

Brazilian gymnast (1959–2023)

- Born: 15 July 1959 São Joaquim, Santa Catarina, Brazil
- Died: 13 October 2023 (aged 64)

Gymnastics career
- Discipline: Men's artistic gymnastics
- Country represented: Brazil

João Luiz Ribeiro (15 July 1959 – 13 October 2023) was a Brazilian gymnast. He competed in seven events at the 1980 Summer Olympics.

First athlete to represent Brazil in artistic gymnastics at an Olympic Games, Ribeiro died on 13 October 2023, at the age of 64.
