= István Vámos =

Hungarian gymnast (born 1958)

- Born: 18 July 1958 (age 68) Budapest, People's Republic of Hungary
- Height: 1.78 m (5 ft 10 in)

Gymnastics career
- Discipline: Men's artistic gymnastics
- Country represented: Hungary
- Club: Ferencvárosi Torna Club
Medal record
Men's artistic gymnastics
Representing Hungary
Olympic Games
Bronze medal – third place	1980 Moscow	Team

István Vámos (born 18 July 1958) is a retired Hungarian gymnast. He competed at the 1980 Summer Olympics in all artistic gymnastics events and won a bronze medal with the Hungarian team. Individually his best achievement was 12th place in the vault.
