= Henri Boério =

French gymnast (born 1952)

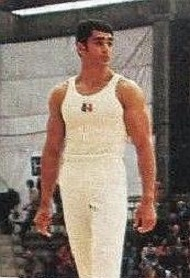

Personal information
- Full name: Henri Louis Boério
- Born: 13 June 1952 (age 74) Sétif, French Algeria

Gymnastics career
- Discipline: Men's artistic gymnastics
- Country represented: France
Medal record
Men's artistic gymnastics
Representing France
Olympic Games
Bronze medal – third place	1976 Montreal	Horizontal bar
European Championships
Bronze medal – third place	1979 Essen	Parallel bars

Henri Louis Boério (born 13 June 1952) is a French former gymnast who competed in the 1972 Summer Olympics, in the 1976 Summer Olympics, and in the 1980 Summer Olympics. He was born in Sétif, French Algeria.
