= Kim Gwang-jin =

North Korean gymnast (born 1956)

- Born: 30 August 1956 (age 70)
- Height: 1.58 m (5 ft 2 in)

Gymnastics career
- Discipline: Men's artistic gymnastics
- Country represented: North Korea
Medal record
Men's artistic gymnastics
Representing North Korea}
Asian Games
Gold medal – first place	1978 Bangkok	Rings

Kim Gwang-jin (born 30 August 1956) is a North Korean gymnast. He competed in eight events at the 1980 Summer Olympics.
