= Yanko Radanchev =

Bulgarian gymnast (born 1957)

- Янко Раданчев
- Born: 23 April 1957 (age 69)

Gymnastics career
- Discipline: Men's artistic gymnastics
- Country represented: Bulgaria

Yanko Radanchev (Bulgarian: Янко Раданчев) (born 23 April 1957) is a Bulgarian gymnast. He competed in eight events at the 1980 Summer Olympics.
