= Sorin Cepoi =

Romanian gymnast

- Born: 13 September 1956 (age 69) Bucharest, Romanian People's Republic
- Height: 1.74 m (5 ft 9 in)
- Spouse: Teodora Ungureanu

Gymnastics career
- Discipline: Men's artistic gymnastics
- Country represented: Romania

Sorin Cepoi (born 13 September 1956) is a Romanian gymnast. He competed at the 1976 Summer Olympics and the 1980 Summer Olympics.
