= Jorge Roche =

Cuban gymnast (born 1957)

- Full name: Jorge Félix Roche Silveira
- Born: 19 November 1957 (age 68)

Gymnastics career
- Discipline: Men's artistic gymnastics
- Country represented: Cuba

Jorge Félix Roche Silveira (born 19 November 1957) is a Cuban gymnast. He competed in eight events at the 1980 Summer Olympics. At these Olympics, he showed as first gymnast ever at the vault a handspring with two front flips. This element is since called the Roche vault. Today (2024) it is valued at 5.2 points (the most difficult vaults are valued at 6.0 points, where one of these elements is based upon the vault of Roche). For example, of the 32 gymnasts that competed at the vault event at the 2024 Summer Olympics in the men's team all around, only 13 gymnasts showed a vault with higher difficulty than 5.2.
