= Kang Gwang-song =

North Korean gymnast (born 1956)

- 강광성
- Born: 5 January 1956 (age 70)
- Height: 1.66 m (5 ft 5 in)

Gymnastics career
- Discipline: Men's artistic gymnastics
- Country represented: North Korea

Kang Gwang-song (Korean: 강광성; born 5 January 1956) is a North Korean former gymnast and coach. He competed in eight events at the 1980 Summer Olympics.

== Biography ==
Born on 5 January 1956 in North Korea, Kang became a gymnast and measured at 166 centimetres (65 in) and 62 kilograms (137 lb) during his career. He was selected to compete for North Korea at the 1980 Summer Olympics in Moscow.

At the Olympics, Kang competed in a total of eight events: the individual all-around, team all-around, floor exercise, horse vault, parallel bars, horizontal bar, rings, and Pommel horse. He placed 40th in the parallel bars, tied for 40th in the horse vault, placed 42nd in the floor exercise, tied for 44th in the horizontal bar, placed 55th in the rings and 62nd in the Pommel horse. Overall, he finished 27th in the individual all-around, while in the team all-around event he helped North Korea place ninth.

Following his competitive career, Kang became a gymnastics coach. As of 2000, he was serving as the head coach of the national team. He oversaw the team's participation at the 2000 Summer Olympics in Sydney, Australia.
