= Han Gwang-song =

North Korean gymnast (born 1957)

- 한광성
- Born: 17 October 1957 (age 68)
- Height: 1.62 m (5 ft 4 in)

Gymnastics career
- Discipline: Men's artistic gymnastics
- Country represented: North Korea
Medal record
Men's artistic gymnastics
Representing North Korea
Asian Games
Bronze medal – third place	1978 Bangkok	Pommel Horse
Bronze medal – third place	1982 New Delhi	Team

Han Gwang-song (born 17 October 1957) is a North Korean gymnast. He competed in eight events at the 1980 Summer Olympics.
