= List of Olympic female artistic gymnasts for Romania =

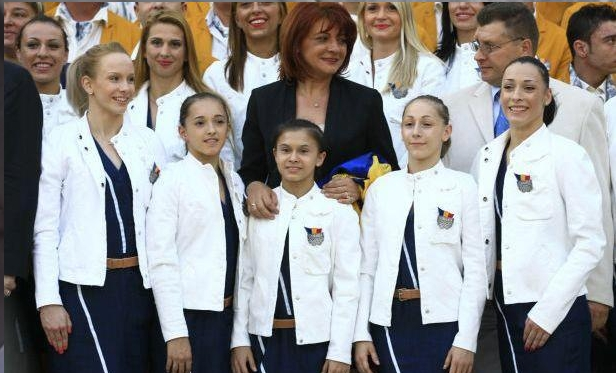
The 2012 Olympic team

Gymnastics events have been staged at the Olympic Games since 1896. Romanian female gymnasts have participated in every Olympic Games since 1952 except for 1968. A total of 74 female gymnasts have represented Romania. Romanian women have won 62 medals at the Olympics – 12 in team all-around, 11 in individual all-around, 10 in balance beam, 13 in floor exercise, 11 in vault, and 5 in uneven bars. The medals include 24 golds. Romania medaled in the team all-around in every Summer Olympics between 1976 and 2012, winning golds in 1984, 2000, and 2004.

Eight Romanian female gymnasts have won at least four medals at the Olympic Games: Nadia Comăneci (nine), Simona Amânar (seven), Lavinia Miloșovici (six), Daniela Silivaș (six), Gina Gogean (five), Cătălina Ponor (five), Ecaterina Szabo (five), and Sandra Izbașa (four).

Nadia Comăneci, who competed at the 1976 and 1980 Olympics, won nine total Olympic medals, the most of any Romanian female gymnast. She won five medals in 1976, including golds in individual all-around, balance beam, and uneven bars. She also became the first woman to ever score a perfect 10 at the Olympics. In 1980, she won four more medals, including golds in balance beam and floor exercise.

In 1984, Ecaterina Szabo won five medals at the only Olympics she participated in. She won golds in team all-around, balance beam, floor exercise, and vault. In 1988, Daniela Silivaș won six medals at the only Olympics she participated in, earning golds in balance beam, floor exercise, and uneven bars.

Lavinia Miloșovici and Gina Gogean both competed at the 1992 and 1996 Olympics. Miloșovici won four of her six medals in 1992, while Gogean won four of her five medals in 1996. Simona Amânar competed in 1996 and 2000 and earned seven medals, the second-most of any Romanian female gymnast. She won gold in the 1996 vault event and the 2000 team all-around and individual all-around.

In 2004, Cătălina Ponor won gold medals in team all-around, floor exercise, and balance beam. She did not compete at the 2008 Olympic Games but came back in 2012 to win two more medals. Sandra Izbașa won four total medals in 2008 and 2012, including the 2008 floor exercise gold and 2012 vault gold.

== Gymnasts ==
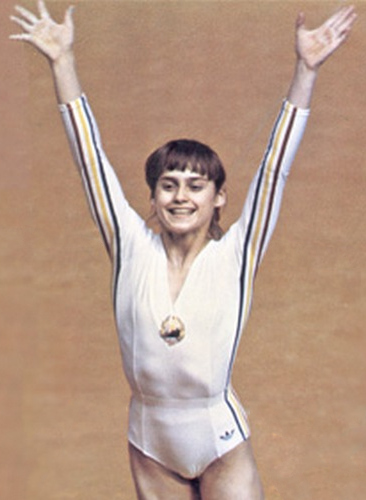
Nadia Comăneci

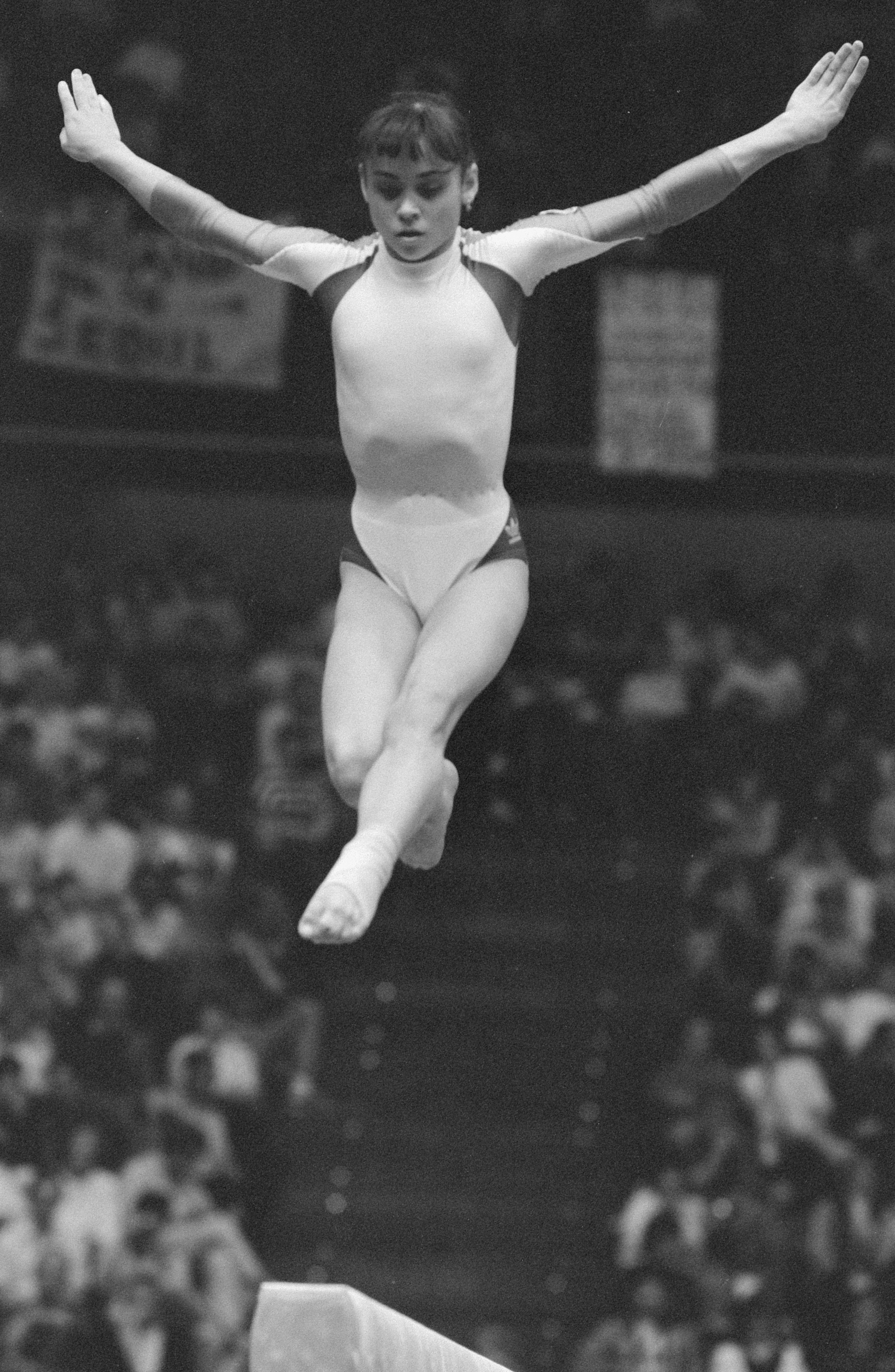
Aurelia Dobre

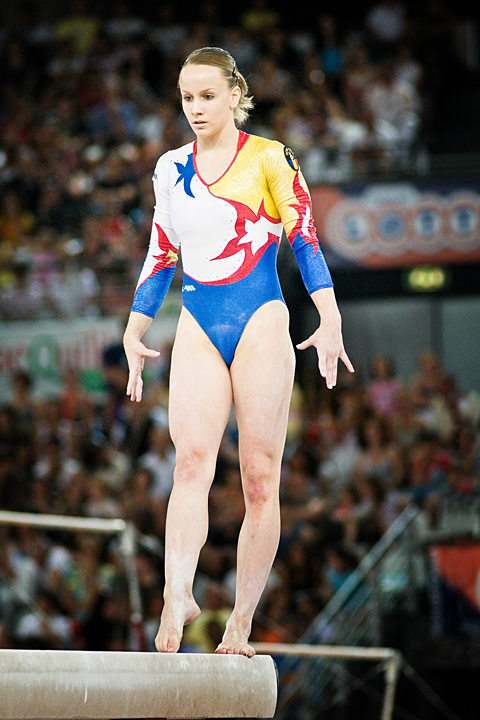
Sandra Izbașa

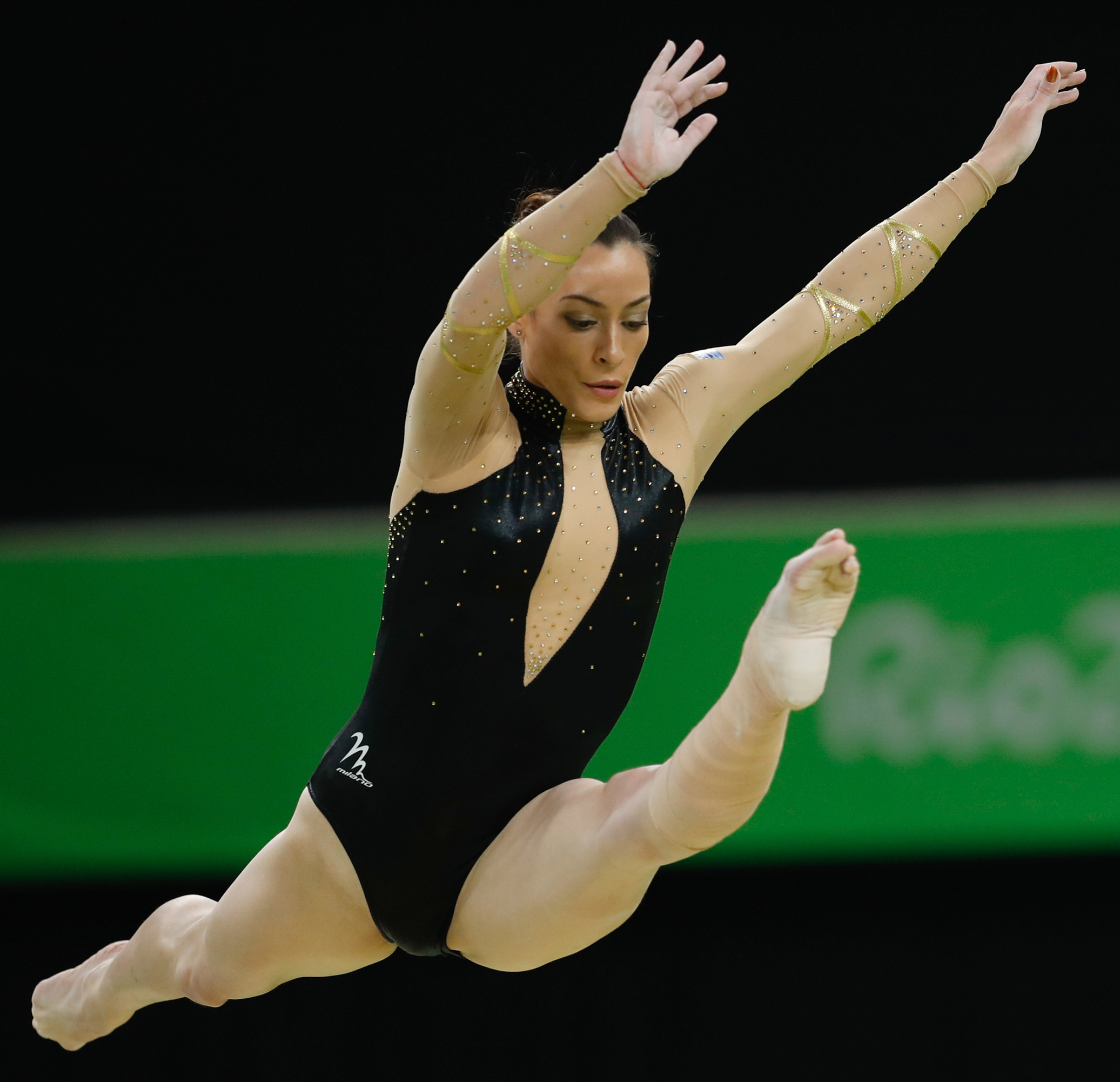
Cătălina Ponor

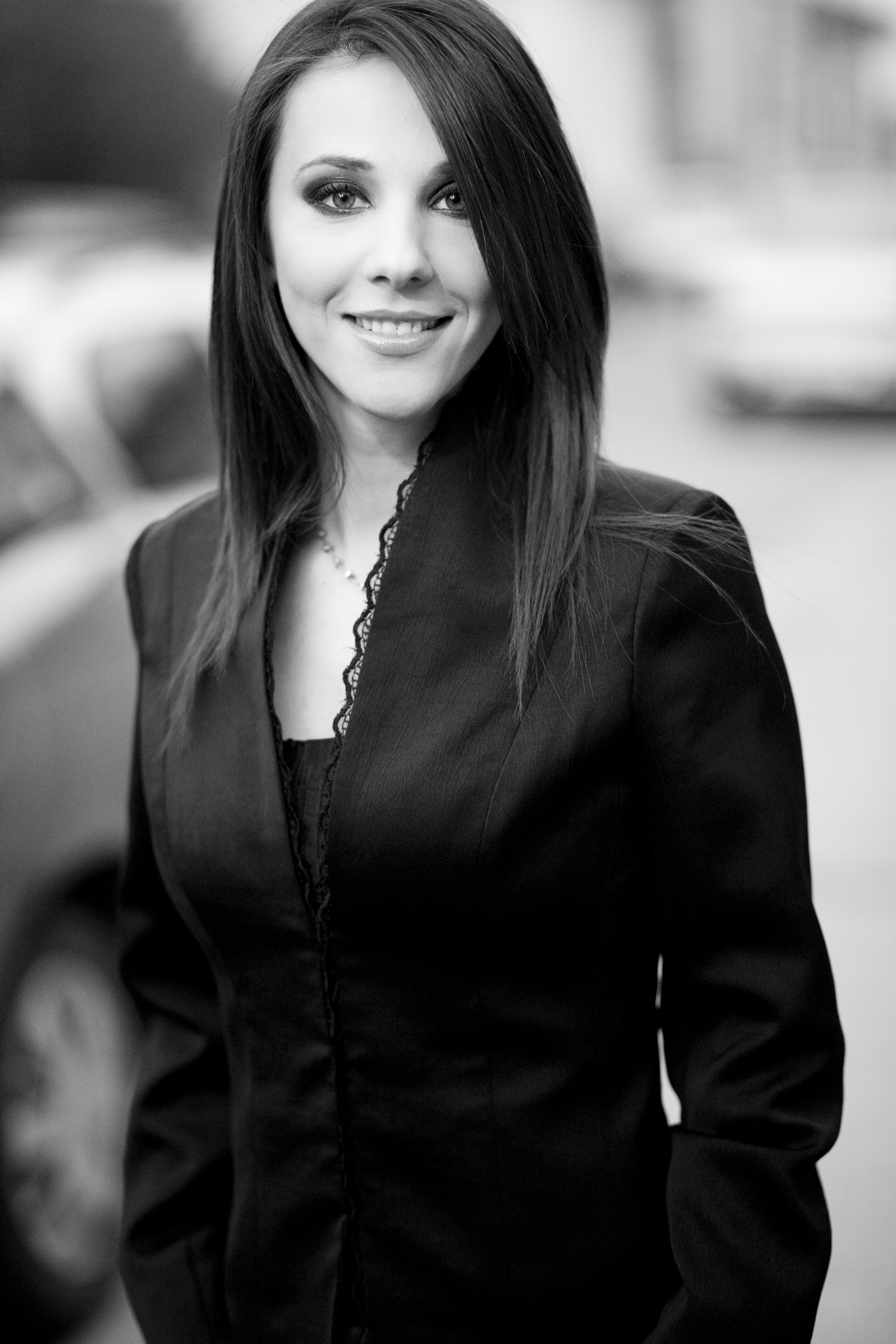
Andreea Răducan

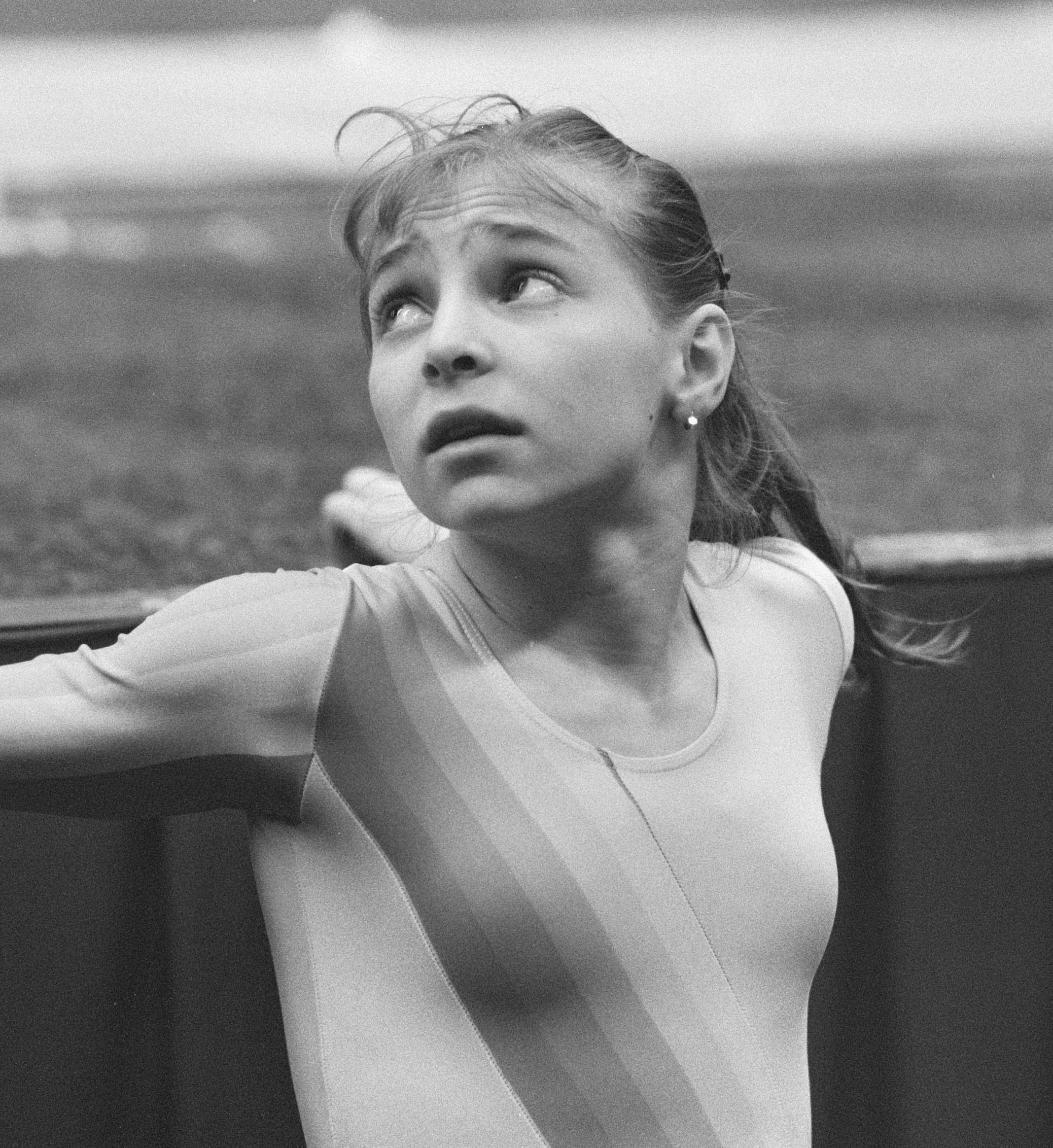
Daniela Silivaș

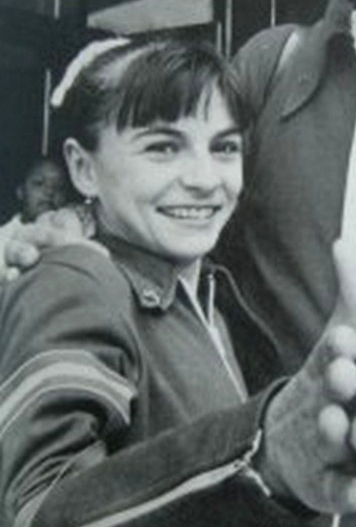
Teodora Ungureanu

Gymnast	Years	Gold	Silver	Bronze	Total medals	Ref.
Elisabeta Abrudeanu	1952	0	0	0	0	
Andreea Acatrinei	2008	0	0	1	1	
Lavinia Agache	1984	1	0	1	2	
Simona Amânar	1996, 2000	3	1	3	7	
Oana Ban	2004	1	0	0	1	
Ana Bărbosu	2024	0	0	1	1	
Loredana Boboc	2000	1	0	0	1	
Cristina Bontaș	1992	0	1	1	2	
Diana Bulimar	2012	0	0	1	1	
Helga Bîrsan	1952	0	0	0	0	
Teofila Băiașu	1952	0	0	0	0	
Elena Ceampelea	1964, 1972	0	0	0	0	
Diana Chelaru	2012	0	0	1	1	
Nadia Comăneci	1976, 1980	5	3	1	9	
Mariana Constantin	1976	0	1	0	1	
Lilia Cosman	2024	0	0	0	0	
Laura Cutina	1984	1	0	0	1	
Cristina Doboșan	1964	0	0	0	0	
Aurelia Dobre	1988	0	1	0	1	
Gabriela Drăgoi	2008	0	0	1	1	
Rodica Dunca	1980	0	1	0	1	
Emilia Eberle	1980	0	2	0	2	
Alexandra Eremia	2004	1	0	1	2	
Georgeta Gabor	1976	0	1	0	1	
Amalia Ghigoarță	2024	0	0	0	0	
Gina Gogean	1992, 1996	0	2	3	5	
Eugenia Golea	1988	0	1	0	1	
Alina Goreac	1972	0	0	0	0	
Anca Grigoraș	1972, 1976	0	1	0	1	
Cristina Elena Grigoraș	1980, 1984	1	1	0	2	
Andreea Grigore	2008	0	0	1	1	
Ileana Gyarfaș	1952	0	0	0	0	
Olga Göllner	1952	0	0	0	0	
Georgeta Hurmuzachi	1956	0	0	1	1	
Vanda Hădărean	1992	0	1	0	1	
Maria Holbură	2020	0	0	0	0	
Paula Ioan	1972	0	0	0	0	
Atanasia Ionescu	1960, 1964	0	0	1	1	
Larisa Iordache	2012, 2020	0	0	1	1	
Sonia Iovan	1956, 1960, 1964	0	0	2	2	
Andreea Isărescu	2000	1	0	0	1	
Sandra Izbașa	2008, 2012	2	0	2	4	
Elena Leușteanu	1956, 1960, 1964	0	0	3	3	
Ionela Loaieș	1996	0	0	1	1	
Alexandra Marinescu	1996	0	0	1	1	
Lavinia Miloșovici	1992, 1996	2	1	3	6	
Olga Munteanu	1952	0	0	0	0	
Elena Mărgărit	1956, 1960	0	0	2	2	
Maria Neculiță	1992	0	1	0	1	
Steliana Nistor	2008	0	0	1	1	
Maria Olaru	2000	1	1	0	2	
Mirela Pașca	1992	0	1	0	1	
Stela Perin	1952	0	0	0	0	
Cătălina Ponor	2004, 2012, 2016	3	1	1	5	
Celestina Popa	1988	0	1	0	1	
Uta Poreceanu	1960	0	0	1	1	
Gabriela Potorac	1988	0	2	1	3	
Andreea Preda	2024	0	0	0	0	
Claudia Presăcan	2000	1	0	0	1	
Simona Păucă	1984	2	0	1	3	
Marcela Păunescu	1972	0	0	0	0	
Monica Roșu	2004	2	0	0	2	
Melita Ruhn	1980	0	1	2	3	
Andreea Răducan	2000	1	1	0	2	
Daniela Silivaș	1988	3	2	1	6	
Eveline Slavici	1952	0	0	0	0	
Silvia Stroescu	2004	1	0	0	1	
Mihaela Stănuleț	1984	1	0	0	1	
Ecaterina Szabo	1984	4	1	0	5	
Elena Săcălici	1956	0	0	1	1	
Gabriela Trușcă	1976	0	1	0	1	
Mirela Țugurlan	1996	0	0	1	1	
Elisabeta Turcu	1972	0	0	0	0	
Dumitrița Turner	1980	0	1	0	1	
Anamaria Tămârjan	2008	0	0	1	1	
Teodora Ungureanu	1976	0	2	1	3	
Camelia Voinea	1988	0	1	0	1	
Sabrina Voinea	2024	0	0	0	0	
Emilia Vătășoiu	1956, 1960, 1964	0	0	2	2	
Nicoleta Daniela Șofronie	2004	1	1	0	2	

== Medalists ==
Medal	Name	Year	Event
Bronze	Hurmuzachi, Iovan, Leușteanu, Mărgărit, Săcălici, Vătășoiu	(Australia) 1956 Melbourne	Women's team
Bronze	Elena Leușteanu	(Australia) 1956 Melbourne	Women's floor exercise
Bronze	Ionescu, Iovan, Leușteanu, Vătășoiu-Liță, Niculescu, Poreceanu	(Italy) 1960 Rome	Women's team
Silver	Comăneci, Constantin, Gabor, Grigoraș, Trușcă, Ungureanu	(Canada) 1976 Montreal	Women's team
Gold	Nadia Comăneci	(Canada) 1976 Montreal	Women's all-around
Gold	Nadia Comăneci	(Canada) 1976 Montreal	Women's uneven bars
Silver	Teodora Ungureanu	(Canada) 1976 Montreal	Women's uneven bars
Gold	Nadia Comăneci	(Canada) 1976 Montreal	Women's balance beam
Bronze	Teodora Ungureanu	(Canada) 1976 Montreal	Women's balance beam
Bronze	Nadia Comăneci	(Canada) 1976 Montreal	Women's floor exercise
Silver	Comăneci, Dunca, Eberle, Grigoraș, Ruhn, Turner	(Soviet Union) 1980 Moscow	Women's team
Silver	Nadia Comăneci	(Soviet Union) 1980 Moscow	Women's all-around
Bronze	Melita Ruhn	(Soviet Union) 1980 Moscow	Women's vault
Silver	Emilia Eberle	(Soviet Union) 1980 Moscow	Women's uneven bars
Bronze	Melita Ruhn	(Soviet Union) 1980 Moscow	Women's uneven bars
Gold	Nadia Comăneci	(Soviet Union) 1980 Moscow	Women's balance beam
Gold	Nadia Comăneci	(Soviet Union) 1980 Moscow	Women's floor exercise
Gold	Agache, Cutina, Grigoraș, Păucă, Szabo, Stănuleț	(United States) 1984 Los Angeles	Women's team
Silver	Ecaterina Szabo	(United States) 1984 Los Angeles	Women's all-around
Bronze	Simona Păucă	(United States) 1984 Los Angeles	Women's all-around
Gold	Ecaterina Szabo	(United States) 1984 Los Angeles	Women's vault
Bronze	Lavinia Agache	(United States) 1984 Los Angeles	Women's vault
Gold	Simona Păucă	(United States) 1984 Los Angeles	Women's balance beam
Gold	Ecaterina Szabo	(United States) 1984 Los Angeles	Women's balance beam
Gold	Ecaterina Szabo	(United States) 1984 Los Angeles	Women's floor exercise
Silver	Dobre, Golea, Popa, Potorac, Silivaș, Voinea	(South Korea) 1988 Seoul	Women's team
Silver	Daniela Silivaș	(South Korea) 1988 Seoul	Women's all-around
Silver	Gabriela Potorac	(South Korea) 1988 Seoul	Women's vault
Bronze	Daniela Silivaș	(South Korea) 1988 Seoul	Women's vault
Gold	Daniela Silivaș	(South Korea) 1988 Seoul	Women's uneven bars
Gold	Daniela Silivaș	(South Korea) 1988 Seoul	Women's balance beam
Bronze	Gabriela Potorac	(South Korea) 1988 Seoul	Women's balance beam
Gold	Daniela Silivaș	(South Korea) 1988 Seoul	Women's floor exercise
Silver	Bontaș, Gogean, Hădărean, Miloșovici, Neculiță, Pașca	(Spain) 1992 Barcelona	Women's team
Bronze	Lavinia Miloșovici	(Spain) 1992 Barcelona	Women's all-around
Gold	Lavinia Miloșovici	(Spain) 1992 Barcelona	Women's vault
Gold	Lavinia Miloșovici	(Spain) 1992 Barcelona	Women's floor exercise
Bronze	Cristina Bontaș	(Spain) 1992 Barcelona	Women's floor exercise
Bronze	Amânar, Gogean, Loaieș, Marinescu, Miloșovici, Țugurlan	(United States) 1996 Atlanta	Women's team
Silver	Gina Gogean	(United States) 1996 Atlanta	Women's all-around
Bronze	Simona Amânar	(United States) 1996 Atlanta	Women's all-around
Bronze	Lavinia Miloșovici	(United States) 1996 Atlanta	Women's all-around
Gold	Simona Amânar	(United States) 1996 Atlanta	Women's vault
Bronze	Gina Gogean	(United States) 1996 Atlanta	Women's vault
Bronze	Gina Gogean	(United States) 1996 Atlanta	Women's balance beam
Silver	Simona Amânar	(United States) 1996 Atlanta	Women's floor exercise
Gold	Amânar, Boboc, Isărescu, Olaru, Presăcan, Răducan	(Australia) 2000 Sydney	Women's team
Gold	Simona Amânar	(Australia) 2000 Sydney	Women's all-around
Silver	Maria Olaru	(Australia) 2000 Sydney	Women's all-around
Silver	Andreea Răducan	(Australia) 2000 Sydney	Women's vault
Bronze	Simona Amânar	(Australia) 2000 Sydney	Women's floor exercise
Gold	Ban, Eremia, Ponor, Roșu, Șofronie, Stroescu	(Greece) 2004 Athens	Women's team
Gold	Monica Roșu	(Greece) 2004 Athens	Women's vault
Gold	Cătălina Ponor	(Greece) 2004 Athens	Women's balance beam
Bronze	Alexandra Eremia	(Greece) 2004 Athens	Women's balance beam
Gold	Cătălina Ponor	(Greece) 2004 Athens	Women's floor exercise
Silver	Nicoleta Daniela Șofronie	(Greece) 2004 Athens	Women's floor exercise
Bronze	Acatrinei, Drăgoi, Grigore, Izbașa, Nistor, Tămârjan	(China) 2008 Beijing	Women's team
Gold	Sandra Izbașa	(China) 2008 Beijing	Women's floor exercise
Bronze	Bulimar, Chelaru, Iordache, Izbașa, Ponor	(United Kingdom) 2012 London	Women's team
Gold	Sandra Izbașa	(United Kingdom) 2012 London	Women's vault
Silver	Cătălina Ponor	(United Kingdom) 2012 London	Women's floor exercise
Bronze	Ana Bărbosu	(France) 2024 Paris	Women's floor exercise
