= Romania women's national artistic gymnastics team =

Romania
- Continental union: European Union of Gymnastics
- National federation: Romanian Gymnastics Federation
- Head coach: Octavian Bellu

Olympic Games
- Appearances: 15
- Medals: Gold: 1984, 2000, 2004; Silver: 1976, 1980, 1988, 1992; Bronze: 1956, 1960, 1996, 2008, 2012

World Championships
- Appearances: 27
- Medals: Gold: 1979, 1987, 1994, 1995, 1997, 1999, 2001; Silver: 1978, 1983, 1985, 1989, 2003; Bronze: 1958, 2007

The Romania women's national artistic gymnastics team represents Romania in FIG international competitions.

== History ==
Romania won team competition bronze medals at the 1956 and 1960 Summer Olympics. They found major success in women's gymnastics starting in 1976. At that year's Olympics, Nadia Comăneci made history, leading Romania to the team silver medal, winning the individual all-around gold medal, and becoming the first woman to score a perfect 10. She scored seven 10s during the Games and subsequently became the most famous gymnast in the world. Romania built on that and for years was the second-best country in women's gymnastics, after the Soviet Union. With Comăneci, they also won the gold medal at the 1979 World Championships and the silver medal at the 1980 Summer Olympics.

In the mid to late-1980s, the team was led by future Hall of Famers Ecaterina Szabo and Daniela Silivaș. They won gold at the 1984 Olympics and silver at the 1988 Olympics. Romania then had their greatest period of success in the 1990s. The team featured three Hall of Famers during that decade: Lavinia Miloșovici, Gina Gogean, and Simona Amânar. They won silver at the 1992 Olympics, bronze at the 1996 Olympics, and gold at the 1994, 1995, 1997, and 1999 World Championships. In 2000, they won their second Olympic team gold medal, and Amânar won the individual all-around title.

Romania continued their success into the 2000s and won another Olympic gold in 2004. However, since then, they have not finished higher than third at the Olympics or Worlds. Their run as one of the sport's top countries ended when they did not qualify for the 2016 Olympics team competition.

=== Overview ===
At the Olympic Games, Romania has competed in the women's artistic gymnastics team competition 15 times. The team has won 12 medals, including gold medals in 1984, 2000, and 2004. Romania has also won the women's team competition seven times at the World Artistic Gymnastics Championships.

== Current senior roster ==
Name	Birthdate and age	Club
Ana Bărbosu	26 July 2006 (age 20)	Standford University
Maria Ceplinschi	12 July 2005 (age 21)	FC Farul Constanța
Lilia Cosman	6 August 2007 (age 19)	LPS Cetate Deva
Ella Oprea Cretu	26 July 2007 (age 19)	CS Dinamo
Sabrina Voinea	4 June 2007 (age 19)	FC Farul Constanța

== Team competition results ==
=== Olympic Games ===
- 1928 — did not participate
- 1936 — did not participate
- 1948 — did not participate
- 1952 — 9th place
  Elisabeta Abrudeanu, Teofila Băiașu, Helga Bîrsan, Olga Göllner, Ileana Gyarfaș, Olga Munteanu, Stela Perin, Eveline Slavici
- 1956 — bronze medal
  Georgeta Hurmuzachi, Sonia Iovan, Elena Leușteanu, Elena Mărgărit, Elena Săcălici, Emilia Vătășoiu
- 1960 — bronze medal
  Atanasia Ionescu, Sonia Iovan, Elena Leușteanu, Elena Mărgărit, Uta Poreceanu, Emilia Vătășoiu
- 1964 — 6th place
  Elena Ceampelea, Cristina Doboșan, Atanasia Ionescu, Sonia Iovan, Elena Leușteanu, Emilia Vătășoiu
- 1968 — did not participate
- 1972 — 6th place
  Elena Ceampelea, Alina Goreac, Anca Grigoraș, Paula Ioan, Marcela Păunescu, Elisabeta Turcu
- 1976 — silver medal
  Nadia Comăneci, Mariana Constantin, Georgeta Gabor, Anca Grigoraș, Gabriela Trușcă, Teodora Ungureanu
- 1980 — silver medal
  Nadia Comăneci, Rodica Dunca, Emilia Eberle, Cristina Elena Grigoraș, Melita Ruhn, Dumitrița Turner
- 1984 — gold medal
  Lavinia Agache, Laura Cutina, Cristina Elena Grigoraș, Simona Păucă, Mihaela Stănuleț, Ecaterina Szabo
- 1988 — silver medal
  Aurelia Dobre, Eugenia Golea, Celestina Popa, Gabriela Potorac, Daniela Silivaș, Camelia Voinea
- 1992 — silver medal
  Cristina Bontaș, Gina Gogean, Vanda Hădărean, Lavinia Miloșovici, Maria Neculiță, Mirela Pașca
- 1996 — bronze medal
  Simona Amânar, Gina Gogean, Ionela Loaieș, Alexandra Marinescu, Lavinia Miloșovici, Mirela Țugurlan
- 2000 — gold medal
  Simona Amânar, Loredana Boboc, Andreea Isărescu, Maria Olaru, Claudia Presăcan, Andreea Răducan
- 2004 — gold medal
  Oana Ban, Alexandra Eremia, Cătălina Ponor, Monica Roșu, Nicoleta Daniela Șofronie, Silvia Stroescu
- 2008 — bronze medal
  Andreea Acatrinei, Gabriela Drăgoi, Andreea Grigore, Sandra Izbașa, Steliana Nistor, Anamaria Tămârjan
- 2012 — bronze medal
  Diana Bulimar, Diana Chelaru, Larisa Iordache, Sandra Izbașa, Cătălina Ponor
- 2016 — did not participate
- 2020 — did not participate
- 2024 – 7th place
  Ana Bărbosu, Lilia Cosman, Amalia Ghigoarță, Andreea Preda, Sabrina Voinea

=== World Championships ===
- 1934 — did not participate
- 1938 — did not participate
- 1950 — did not participate
- 1954 — 4th place
  Teofila Băiașu, Elena Mărgărit, Ileana Gyarfaș, Agneta Hofman, Elena Leușteanu, Eveline Slavici, Anita Țicu, Emilia Vătășoiu
- 1958 — bronze medal
  Elena Mărgărit, Atanasia Ionescu, Sonia Iovan, Elena Săcălici, Elena Leușteanu, Emilia Vătășoiu
- 1962 — 9th place
  Mariana Ilie, Sonia Iovan, Anna Margineanu, Elena Mărgărit, Emilia Vătășoiu, Atanasia Zimresteanu
- 1966 — did not participate
- 1970 — 5th place
  Rodica Apateanu, Elena Ceampelea, Alina Goreac, Paula Ioan, Olga Stefan, Elisabeta Turcu
- 1974 — 4th place
  Elena Ceampelea, Alina Goreac, Anca Grigoraș, Paula Ioan, Aurelia Dobre, Rodica Sabău
- 1978 — silver medal
  Nadia Comăneci, Emilia Eberle, Anca Grigoraș, Marilena Neacșu, Teodora Ungureanu, Marilena Vlădărău
- 1979 — gold medal
  Nadia Comăneci, Rodica Dunca, Emilia Eberle, Melita Ruhn, Dumitrița Turner, Marilena Vlădărău
- 1981 — 4th place
  Lavinia Agache, Rodica Dunca, Emilia Eberle, Cristina Elena Grigoraș, Mihaela Stănuleț, Dumitrița Turner
- 1983 — silver medal
  Lavinia Agache, Mirela Barbălată, Laura Cutina, Simona Renciu, Mihaela Stănuleț, Ecaterina Szabo
- 1985 — silver medal
  Laura Cutina, Eugenia Golea, Celestina Popa, Daniela Silivaș, Ecaterina Szabo, Camelia Voinea
- 1987 — gold medal
  Aurelia Dobre, Eugenia Golea, Celestina Popa, Daniela Silivaș, Ecaterina Szabo, Camelia Voinea
- 1989 — silver medal
  Cristina Bontaș, Aurelia Dobre, Lăcrămioara Filip, Eugenia Popa, Gabriela Potorac, Daniela Silivaș
- 1991 — bronze medal
  Cristina Bontaș, Vanda Hădărean, Lavinia Miloșovici, Maria Neculiță, Mirela Pașca, Eugenia Popa
- 1994 — gold medal
  Simona Amânar, Gina Gogean, Nadia Hațegan, Ionela Loaieș, Daniela Mărănducă, Lavinia Miloșovici, Claudia Presăcan
- 1995 — gold medal
  Simona Amânar, Andreea Cacovean, Gina Gogean, Nadia Hațegan, Alexandra Marinescu, Lavinia Miloșovici, Claudia Presăcan
- 1997 — gold medal
  Simona Amânar, Gina Gogean, Alexandra Marinescu, Claudia Presăcan, Mirela Țugurlan, Corina Ungureanu
- 1999 — gold medal
  Simona Amânar, Loredana Boboc, Andreea Isărescu, Maria Olaru, Andreea Răducan, Corina Ungureanu
- 2001 — gold medal
  Loredana Boboc, Sabina Cojocar, Carmen Ionescu, Andreea Răducan, Silvia Stroescu, Andreea Ulmeanu
- 2003 — silver medal
  Oana Ban, Alexandra Eremia, Florica Leonida, Andreea Munteanu, Cătălina Ponor, Monica Roșu
- 2006 — 4th place
  Elena Chiric, Daniela Druncea, Sandra Izbașa, Florica Leonida, Steliana Nistor, Loredana Sucar
- 2007 — bronze medal
  Daniela Druncea, Andreea Grigore, Sandra Izbașa, Steliana Nistor, Cerasela Pătrașcu, Cătălina Ponor
- 2010 — 4th place
  Diana Chelaru, Gabriela Drăgoi, Raluca Haidu, Sandra Izbașa, Ana Porgras
- 2011 — 4th place
  Diana Bulimar, Diana Chelaru, Raluca Haidu, Cătălina Ponor, Ana Porgras, Amelia Racea
- 2014 — 4th place
  Larisa Iordache, Andreea Munteanu, Anamaria Ocolișan, Ștefania Stănilă, Paula Tudorache, Silvia Zarzu
- 2015 — 13th place
  Diana Bulimar, Larisa Iordache, Andreea Iridon, Laura Jurca, Silvia Zarzu
- 2018 — 13th place
  Ioana Crișan, Carmen Ghiciuc, Denisa Golgotă, Maria Holbură, Nica Ivănuș
- 2019 — 22nd place
  Ioana Crișan, Carmen Ghiciuc, Denisa Golgotă, Maria Holbură
- 2023 - 10th place
  Ana Bărbosu, Lilia Cosman, Amalia Ghigoarță, Andreea Preda, Sabrina Voinea
- 2025 - individual
  Denisa Golgota, Ella Oprea, Anamaria Mihaescu, Sabrina Voinea

=== Junior World Championships ===
- 2019 — 4th place
  Antonia Duță, Silviana Sfiringu, Ioana Stănciulescu
- 2023 - 8th place
  Gabriela Vanoaga, Crina Tudor, Anamaria Mihaescu

== Most decorated gymnasts ==
This list includes all Romanian female artistic gymnasts who have won at least four medals at the Olympic Games and the World Artistic Gymnastics Championships combined.

Rank	Gymnast	Years	Team	AA	VT	UB	BB	FX	Olympic Total	World Total	Total
1	Gina Gogean	1992–1997	1992; 1996; 1994; 1995; 1997	1996; 1993	1996; 1994; 1996; 1995; 1997		1996; 1997; 1993	1995; 1996; 1997; 1993; 1994	5	15	20
2	Lavinia Miloșovici	1991–1996	1992; 1996; 1994; 1995; 1991	1992; 1996; 1994; 1995	1992; 1991; 1993; 1994	1992	1993; 1991	1992; 1994; 1996	6	13	19
3	Simona Amânar	1994–2000	2000; 1996; 1994; 1995; 1997; 1999	2000; 1996; 1997	1996; 1995; 1997; 1996; 1999			1996; 2000; 1999	7	10	17
4	Daniela Silivaș	1985–1989	1988; 1987; 1985; 1989	1988; 1987	1988	1988; 1987; 1989	1988; 1985; 1989	1988; 1987; 1989	6	10	16
5	Ecaterina Szabo	1983–1987	1984; 1987; 1983; 1985	1984; 1983	1984; 1983; 1985	1983	1984; 1985; 1987	1984; 1983	5	10	15
6	Nadia Comăneci	1976–1980	1976; 1980; 1979	1976; 1980; 1978	1978	1976	1976; 1980; 1978	1980; 1976	9	4	13
7	Andreea Răducan	1999–2001	2000; 1999; 2001	2001	2000; 2001		2001; 1999	1999; 2001	2	8	10
8	Cătălina Ponor	2003–2012	2004; 2012; 2003; 2007				2004; 2003; 2005	2004; 2012; 2003	5	5	10
9	Emilia Eberle	1978–1980	1980; 1979; 1978			1980; 1978; 1979	1978	1979; 1978	2	7	9
10	Cristina Bontaș	1989–1992	1992; 1989; 1991	1991	1989			1992; 1991; 1989	2	6	8
11	Aurelia Dobre	1987–1989	1988; 1987; 1989	1987	1987		1987	1987	1	6	7
12	Sandra Izbașa	2006–2012	2008; 2012; 2007	2006	2012		2006	2008	4	3	7
13	Lavinia Agache	1983–1984	1984; 1983		1984; 1983	1983	1983		2	4	6
14	Melita Ruhn	1979–1980	1980; 1979	1979	1980	1980		1979	3	3	6
15	Maria Olaru	1999–2000	2000; 1999	2000; 1999	1999				2	3	5
16	Gabriela Potorac	1988–1989	1988; 1989		1988		1988; 1989		3	2	5
17	Larisa Iordache	2012–2015	2012	2014; 2015				2014; 2013	1	4	5
18	Claudia Presăcan	1994–2000	2000; 1994; 1995; 1997						1	3	4
19	Eugenia Golea	1985–1988	1988; 1987; 1985		1987				1	3	4
20	Teodora Ungureanu	1976–1978	1976; 1978			1976	1976		3	1	4
21	Maria Neculiță	1991–1992	1992; 1991				1992	1992	1	3	4
22	Elena Leușteanu	1956–1960	1956; 1960; 1958					1956	3	1	4

== Hall of Famers ==
Nine national team gymnasts and two national team coaches have been inducted into the International Gymnastics Hall of Fame:

- Nadia Comăneci – 1993
- Béla Károlyi (coach) – 1997
- Ecaterina Szabo – 2000
- Teodora Ungureanu – 2001
- Daniela Silivaș – 2002
- Simona Amânar – 2007
- Octavian Bellu (coach) – 2009
- Lavinia Miloșovici – 2011
- Gina Gogean – 2013
- Aurelia Dobre – 2016
- Andreea Răducan – 2018
- Cătălina Ponor – 2022

== See also ==
- List of Olympic female artistic gymnasts for Romania
