= Elisabeta Turcu =

Romanian artistic gymnast

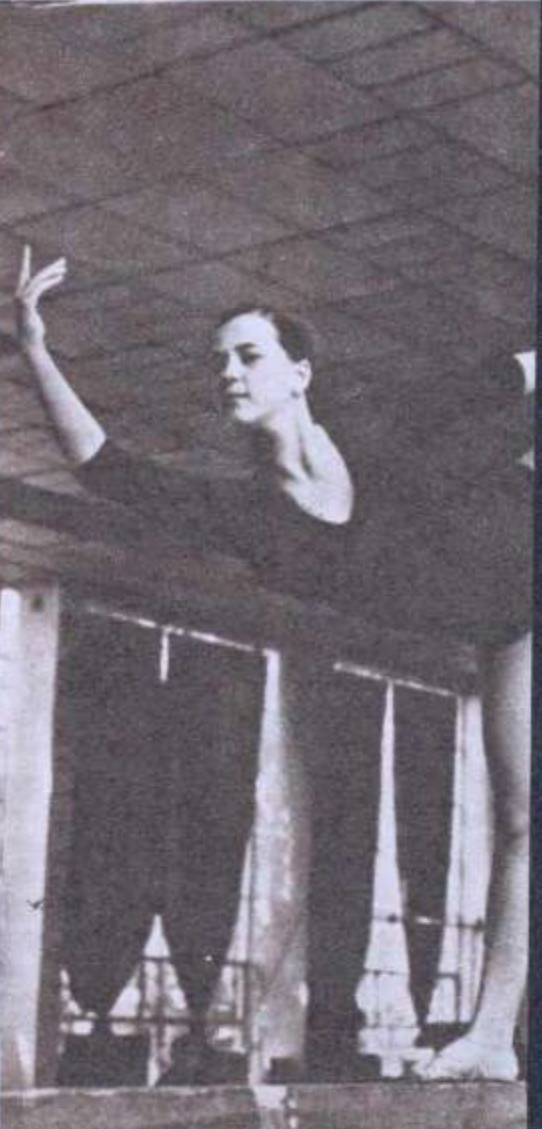

Personal information
- Nickname: Elena
- Born: 2 May 1953 (age 73) Ploieşti, Romania
- Height: 1.58 m (5 ft 2 in)

Gymnastics career
- Discipline: Women's artistic gymnastics
- Country represented: Romania (1970–1972)

Elisabeta Turcu (born 2 May 1953) is a Romanian former artistic gymnast who competed at the 1972 Summer Olympics.

== Gymnastics career ==
At the 1970 Romanian Championships, Turcu won the bronze medal in the all-around behind Elena Ceampelea and Olga Stefan. She competed at a friendly meet against Czechoslovakia where the Romanian team finished second, and Turcu placed eighth in the all-around. She competed at her first and only World Artistic Gymnastics Championships at the 1970 World Championships in Ljubljana. The Romanian team of Turcu, Ceampelea, Stefan, Paula Ioan, Alina Goreac, and Rodica Apateanu finished fifth behind the Soviet Union, East Germany, Czechoslovakia, and Japan. Individually, Turcu finished thirtieth in the all-around. She won the gold medal in the all-around at the 1971 International Championships of Romania.

Turcu won the all-around gold medal at a 1972 friendly meet against China and helped the Romanian team win. Then at a friendly meet against the Netherlands, she finished twelfth in the all-around. She was selected to represent Romania at the 1972 Summer Olympics alongside Elena Ceampelea, Alina Goreac, Anca Grigoraș, Paula Ioan, and Marcela Păunescu. In the team competition, they finished sixth. Turcu finished forty-fourth in the all-around and did not qualify for the all-around final.

== See also ==
- List of Olympic female artistic gymnasts for Romania
