= Cristina Elena Grigoraș =

Romanian gymnast (born 1966)

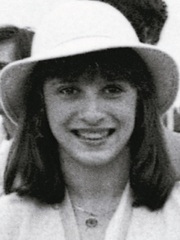

Personal information
- Born: 11 February 1966 (age 60) Satu Mare, Romania
- Height: 156 cm (5 ft 1 in)

Gymnastics career
- Discipline: Women's artistic gymnastics
- Country represented: Romania
- Head coach: Adrian Goreac
- Assistant coaches: Adrian Stan, Maria Cosma, Octavian Belu
- Former coaches: Márta Károlyi, Béla Károlyi
- Eponymous skills: Balance beam: forward salto tucked with ½ twist (180°) take off from both legs
- Retired: 1985
Medal record
Olympic Games
Gold medal – first place	1984 Los Angeles	Team
Silver medal – second place	1980 Moscow	Team
European Championships
Gold medal – first place	1981 Madrid	Vault
Silver medal – second place	1981 Madrid	All around
Silver medal – second place	1981 Madrid	Uneven bars
Bronze medal – third place	1981 Madrid	Floor

Cristina Elena Grigoraș (born 11 February 1966) is a retired Romanian artistic gymnast. She is a two-time Olympic medalist with the team (gold in 1984 and silver in 1980). Individually, she won four medals (vault, all-around, uneven bars and floor) at the 1981 European Championships. She is best known for a skill on the balance beam named after her: forward salto tucked with ½ twist (180°) take off from both legs.

== Gymnastics career ==
Grigoraș trained at CSS Cetate Deva with Márta and Béla Károlyi until their defection to United States in 1981 and with coaches Adrian Goreac, Adrian Stan, Maria Cosma and Octavian Belu after 1981.

=== 1980 and the Olympic Games ===
Her senior debut in an international event was at the 1980 Italian-Romanian meet where she placed first with the team and second all-around. Her participation at the 1980 World Cup in Toronto brought her a bronze medal on vault. She also placed fourth all around ahead of teammate Emilia Eberle, fifth on floor and eight on balance beam. Together with Nadia Comăneci, Rodica Dunca, Emilia Eberle, Melita Ruhn and Dumitriţa Turner, Grigoraș was a member of the silver medal team at the 1980 Olympics. At these Olympic games she did not compete in any individual final event.

=== 1981 ===
At the 1981 European Championships in Madrid, Spain, Grigoraș medaled in all events except the balance beam. She won silver in the all around behind Maxi Gnauck, gold on vault, silver on uneven bars, bronze on floor and she placed eighth on beam. Her results in the all around and the events finals were the highest among her team members. In 1981 she also won the Champions All Trophy and was a team member at the 1981 World Championships in Moscow. At these World Championships she placed fourth with the team and fifth in the all around and uneven bars events. Once again her result in the all around was the highest among the Romanian team.

=== 1982–1984 and the Olympic Games ===
In 1982 Grigoraș did not compete at all. She returned to gymnastics events in 1983, but she was only an alternate in the team at the 1983 World Championships. In 1984 she won several medals for all around at some minor international events. In 1984 Grigoraș went with the team to Los Angeles to compete at the 1984 Olympic Games. The other members of the team were Lavinia Agache, Laura Cutina, Simona Păucă, Mihaela Stănuleţ, and Ecaterina Szabo. She contributed to the team gold medal and she placed eighth in the preliminaries of the all around event.

== Eponymous skill ==
Grigoraș has one eponymous skill listed in the Code of Points.

Apparatus	Name	Description	Difficulty (Note: Valid for the 2025–2028 Code of Points)
Balance beam	Grigoraș	Salto forward tucked with ½ turn (180°) take-off from both legs	F (0.6)

== Retirement ==
Grigoraș' last event appears to be the 1985 Dutch Romanian meet.
