= Ioan (surname) =

Ioan is a surname. Notable people with the surname include:

- Paula Ioan (born 1955), Romanian artistic gymnast
- Șerban Ioan (born 1948), Romanian high jumper
