= Păunescu =

Păunescu is a Romanian surname. Notable people with the surname include:

- Adrian Păunescu (1943–2010), Romanian poet, journalist, and politician
- Gheorghe Păunescu (born 1948), Romanian gymnast
- Marcela Păunescu (born 1955), Romanian gymnast
- Oprea Păunescu (born 1936), Romanian rower
