= Gymnastics at the 1980 Summer Olympics – Women's uneven bars =

Women's uneven bars at the Games of the XXII Olympiad
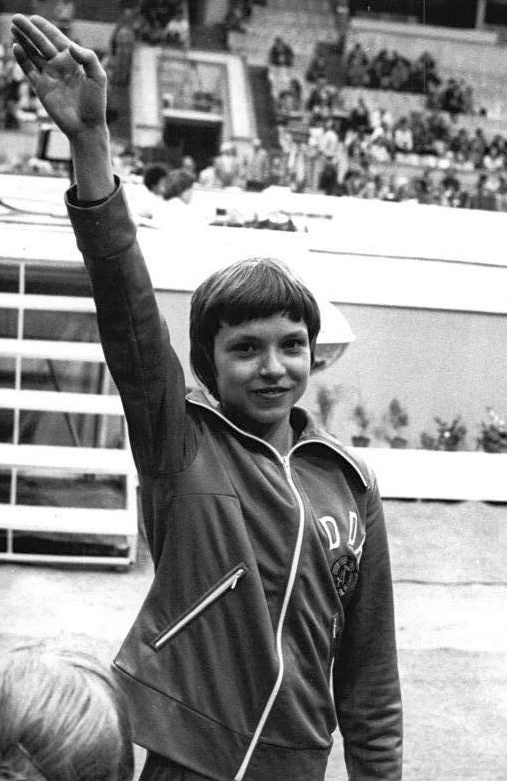
- Gold medalist Maxi Gnauck (1983)
- Venue: Sports Palace of the Central Lenin Stadium
- Date: July 21, 1980 (qualifying); July 25, 1980 (final)
- Competitors: 6 from 3 nations
- Winning points: 19.875

Medalists
1st place, gold medalist(s)		Maxi Gnauck	East Germany
2nd place, silver medalist(s)		Emilia Eberle	Romania
3rd place, bronze medalist(s)		Steffi Kräker	East Germany
3rd place, bronze medalist(s)		Melita Ruhn	Romania
3rd place, bronze medalist(s)		Maria Filatova	Soviet Union

These are the results of the women's uneven bars competition, one of six events for female competitors in artistic gymnastics at the 1980 Summer Olympics in Moscow. The qualification and final rounds took place on July 21, 23 and 25th at the Sports Palace of the Central Lenin Stadium.

== Results ==
=== Qualification ===
Sixty-two gymnasts competed in the compulsory and optional rounds on July 21 and 23. The six highest scoring gymnasts advanced to the final on July 25. Each country was limited to two competitors in the final. Half of the points earned by each gymnast during both the compulsory and optional rounds carried over to the final. This constitutes the "prelim" score.

=== Final ===
Rank	Gymnast	C	O	Prelim	Final	Total
Gold medal	Maxi Gnauck (GDR)	9.950	10.000	9.975	9.900	19.875
Silver medal	Emilia Eberle (ROU)	9.900	10.000	9.950	9.900	19.850
Bronze medal	Steffi Kräker (GDR)	9.850	9.900	9.875	9.900	19.775
Bronze medal	Melita Rühn (ROU)	9.850	9.900	9.875	9.900	19.775
Bronze medal	Maria Filatova (URS)	9.850	9.900	9.875	9.900	19.775
6	Nellie Kim (URS)	9.900	9.850	9.875	9.850	19.725

Preceded by Gymnastics at the 1976 Summer Olympics – Women's uneven bars	Women's uneven bars 1980	Succeeded by Gymnastics at the 1984 Summer Olympics – Women's uneven bars
