= Gymnastics at the 1980 Summer Olympics – Women's balance beam =

Women's balance beam at the Games of the XXII Olympiad
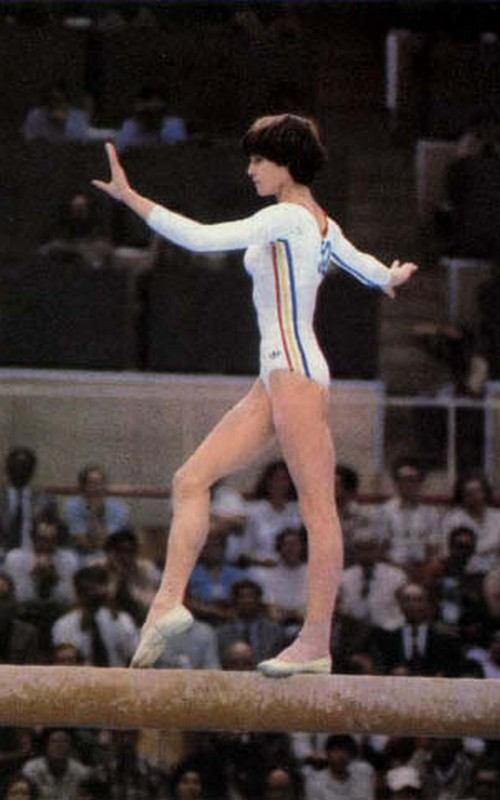
- Nadia Comăneci on balance beam at the 1980 Summer Olympics
- Venue: Palace of Sports
- Date: 21 July 1980 (qualifying); 25 July 1980 (final)
- Competitors: 62 from 16 nations
- Winning total: 19.800

Medalists
1st place, gold medalist(s)		Nadia Comăneci	Romania
2nd place, silver medalist(s)		Yelena Davydova	Soviet Union
3rd place, bronze medalist(s)		Natalia Shaposhnikova	Soviet Union

These are the results of the women's balance beam competition, one of six events for female competitors in artistic gymnastics, at the 1980 Summer Olympics in Moscow. The qualification and final rounds took place on July 21, and July 25 at the Sports Palace of the Central Lenin Stadium.

== Results ==
=== Qualification ===
Sixty-two gymnasts competed in the compulsory and optional rounds on July 21 and 23. The six highest scoring gymnasts advanced to the final on July 25. Each country was limited to two competitors in the final. Half of the points earned by each gymnast during both the compulsory and optional rounds carried over to the final. This constitutes the "prelim" score.

=== Final ===
Rank	Gymnast	C	O	Prelim	Final	Total
Gold medal	Nadia Comăneci (ROU)	10.000	9.900	9.950	9.850	19.800
Silver medal	Yelena Davydova (URS)	9.900	9.800	9.850	9.900	19.750
Bronze medal	Natalia Shaposhnikova (URS)	9.950	9.800	9.875	9.850	19.725
4	Maxi Gnauck (GDR)	9.900	9.800	9.850	9.850	19.700
5	Radka Zemanová (TCH)	9.800	9.800	9.800	9.850	19.650
6	Emilia Eberle (ROU)	9.900	9.900	9.900	9.500	19.400

Preceded by Gymnastics at the 1976 Summer Olympics – Women's balance beam	Women's balance beam event 1980	Succeeded by Gymnastics at the 1984 Summer Olympics – Women's balance beam
