= Phoebe Mills =

American attorney and Olympic medalist (born 1972)

- Born: November 2, 1972 (age 54) Northfield, Illinois, U.S.

Gymnastics career
Medal record
Women's artistic gymnastics
Representing the United States
Olympic Games
Bronze medal – third place	1988 Seoul	Balance beam

Phoebe Mills (born November 2, 1972) is an American attorney and Olympic medalist who has been active in the sports of artistic gymnastics, diving, speed skating and snowboarding.

== Personal life ==
Before becoming a gymnast, Mills was a record-holding competitive speed skater. Her brother, Nathaniel Mills, competed in speed skating at the 1992 Winter Olympics, the 1994 Winter Olympics, and the 1998 Winter Olympics, and her sister Jessica Mills won the 1989 World Junior Figure Skating Championships.

Mills attended New Trier High School, before transferring for her senior year to Spanish River Community High School. She is a 2004 graduate of Vermont Law School, with a degree in environmental law. Following her graduation from law school, she owned her own small environmental law firm near Londonderry, Vermont. She currently resides in California directing Woodward at Tahoe. She is married and has a young daughter.

== Gymnastics ==
Mills was coached by Marta and Béla Károlyi in Houston, Texas. She attended her first U.S. Nationals in 1984, finishing eighth in the junior division. While Mills was sometimes overshadowed in the media by her teammate Kristie Phillips, she developed a reputation as a steady, consistent competitor in national and international meets, placing third at the 1985 City of Popes competition and second at the 1986 U.S. Olympic Festival and U.S. Nationals (junior division). In 1987 she attended her first and only World Gymnastics Championships as a member of the sixth-place American team. She was unable to compete in the 1987 Pan American Games because of an injured heel.

1988 was Mills' breakout year. She won most of the competitions she entered, including the U.S. Nationals, the American Cup, the Mardi Gras Invitational and the International Mixed Pairs, was named the United States Olympic Committee's Gymnast of the Year and was nominated for the prestigious James E. Sullivan Award. She also placed first at the U.S. Olympic Trials, easily earning a spot on the American squad for the 1988 Olympics in Seoul.

Mills emerged as the U.S. team's most successful gymnast at the Olympics, leading the team to a fourth-place finish. While she finished a modest fifteenth place in the all-around (due to a fall on balance beam), she also qualified for three event finals, more than any other member of the team. She won a bronze medal on the balance beam, tied with Gabriela Potorac and behind Daniela Silivaş and Elena Shushunova. With her third-place finish, Mills became the first individual American female gymnast to win a medal in a fully attended Olympics, and the only American gymnast, male or female, to medal in Seoul. She also finished eighth on the uneven bars and sixth on the floor exercise.

Mills continued to compete in early 1989, but retired later that year, due in part to the effects of Epstein-Barr syndrome. She has occasionally returned to the sport as a coach. In 2000, Mills was inducted into the USA Gymnastics Hall of Fame.

== Diving ==
After retiring from gymnastics, Mills became involved with competitive diving, specializing in the 10-meter platform event. She joined the diving team at the University of Miami in Florida, where she won the Big East Conference for three years. She also competed in national diving events, participating in the 1993 Olympic Festival and the U.S. Diving Championships. Mills retired from diving after graduation.

== Snowboarding ==
Most recently, Mills has been involved with the sport of snowboarding. She has acted as a snowboarding coach and instructor, working with the U.S. junior national team. Mills served as a judge at the 2014 Sochi Olympic Games.
