= Gymnastics at the 2004 Summer Olympics – Women's vault =

Women's vault at the Games of the XXVIII Olympiad
- Venue: Olympic Indoor Hall
- Date: 15 August 2004 (qualifying); 22 August 2004 (final)
- Competitors: 8 from 7 nations

Medalists
1st place, gold medalist(s)		Monica Roșu	Romania
2nd place, silver medalist(s)		Annia Hatch	United States
3rd place, bronze medalist(s)		Anna Pavlova	Russia

These are the results of the women's vault competition, one of six events for female competitors in the artistic gymnastics discipline contested at the 2004 Summer Olympics in Athens. The qualification and final rounds took place on August 15 and August 22 at the Olympic Indoor Hall.

The medals for the competition were presented by Bruno Grandi, Italy; IOC Member, and the medalists' bouquets were presented by Jackie Fie, United States; President of the Women's Technical Committee of the FIG.

== Results ==
=== Qualification ===
Eighty-four gymnasts competed in the vault event in the artistic gymnastics qualification round on August 15. The eight highest scoring gymnasts advanced to the final on August 22.

=== Final ===
Rank	Gymnast	#	Start Value	South Africa	Netherlands	Sweden	Iceland	Canada	Luxembourg	Penalty	Average	Total
Gold medal	Monica Roșu (ROU)	1	9.90	9.60	9.50	9.50	9.60	9.65	9.60	—	9.575	9.656
Gold medal	Monica Roșu (ROU)	2	10.00	9.80	9.50	9.70	9.75	9.75	9.75	—	9.737	9.656
Silver medal	Annia Hatch (USA)	1	9.80	9.30	9.35	9.40	9.50	9.50	9.35	—	9.400	9.481
Silver medal	Annia Hatch (USA)	2	9.80	9.40	9.55	9.55	9.60	9.60	9.55	—	9.562	9.481
Bronze medal	Anna Pavlova (RUS)	1	9.80	9.45	9.40	9.45	9.35	9.45	9.40	—	9.425	9.475
Bronze medal	Anna Pavlova (RUS)	2	9.80	9.45	9.50	9.50	9.55	9.55	9.55	—	9.525	9.475
4	Elena Zamolodchikova (RUS)	1	9.80	9.45	9.35	9.45	9.50	9.45	9.45	—	9.450	9.412
4	Elena Zamolodchikova (RUS)	2	9.90	9.45	9.30	9.25	9.40	9.45	9.35	—	9.375	9.412
5	Kang Yun-mi (PRK)	1	10.00	9.50	9.40	9.40	9.45	9.60	9.50	—	9.462	9.381
5	Kang Yun-mi (PRK)	2	9.90	9.35	9.15	9.35	9.25	9.40	9.25	—	9.300	9.381
6	Alona Kvasha (UKR)	1	9.80	9.30	9.35	9.25	9.50	9.35	9.20	—	9.312	9.343
6	Alona Kvasha (UKR)	2	9.70	9.35	9.25	9.35	9.50	9.40	9.40	—	9.375	9.343
7	Wang Tiantian (CHN)	1	9.80	8.85	8.60	8.80	8.80	8.85	8.80	—	8.812	9.081
7	Wang Tiantian (CHN)	2	9.90	9.35	9.25	9.35	9.35	9.40	9.35	—	9.350	9.081
8	Coralie Chacon (FRA)	1	9.90	8.80	8.75	8.95	8.95	8.95	9.00	—	8.912	4.456
8	Coralie Chacon (FRA)	2**	0.00	0.00	0.00	0.00	0.00	0.00	0.00	—	0.000	4.456

**Coralie Chacon gave up her second vault because she got hurt after the first vault, which was a Double-Twisting Tsukahara (Zamolodchikova).
