= Gymnastics at the 1984 Summer Olympics – Women's balance beam =

Women's Balance Beam at the Games of the XXIII Olympiad
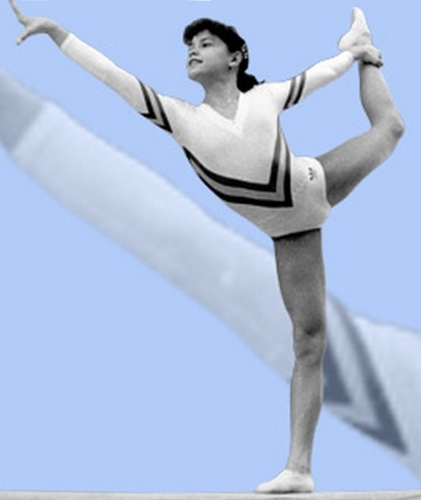
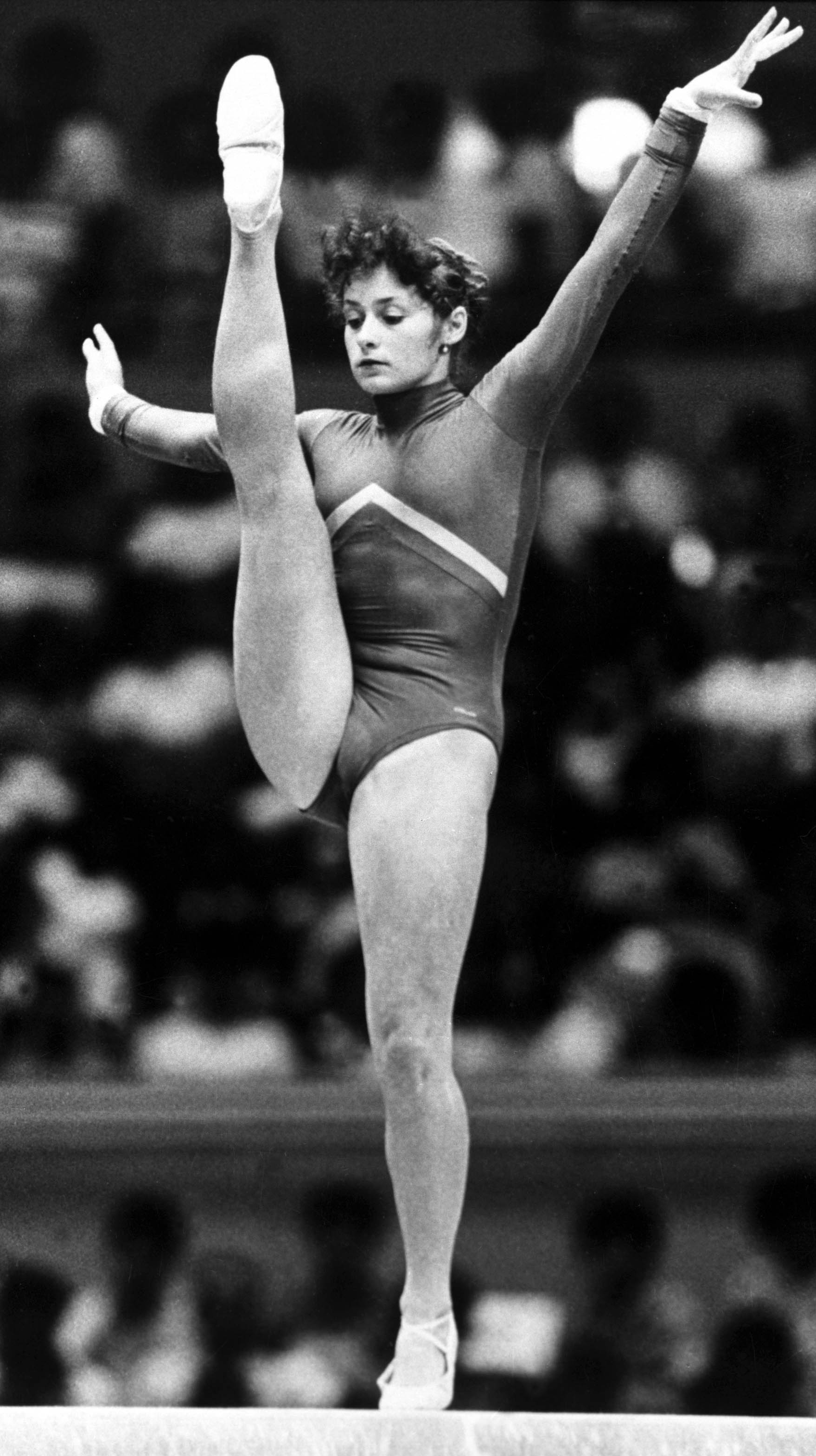
- Simona Păucă (1984) Ecaterina Szabo (1985)
- Venue: UCLA's Pauley Pavilion

Medalists
1st place, gold medalist(s)		Simona Păucă	Romania
1st place, gold medalist(s)		Ecaterina Szabo	Romania
2nd place, silver medalist(s)		not awarded	
3rd place, bronze medalist(s)		Kathy Johnson	United States

These are the results of the women's balance beam competition, one of six events for female competitors in artistic gymnastics at the 1984 Summer Olympics in Los Angeles. The qualification and final rounds took place on July 30, August 1 and 5 at UCLA’s Pauley Pavilion.

== Results ==
Sixty-five gymnasts competed in the compulsory and optional rounds on July 30 and August 1. The eight highest scoring gymnasts advanced to the final on August 5. Each country was limited to two competitors in the final. Half of the points earned by each gymnast during both the compulsory and optional rounds carried over to the final. This constitutes the "prelim" score.

Rank	Gymnast	C	O	Prelim	Final	Total
Gold medal	Simona Păucă (ROU)	9.800	10.000	9.900	9.900	19.800
Gold medal	Ecaterina Szabo (ROU)	9.750	9.950	9.850	9.950	19.800
Bronze medal	Kathy Johnson (USA)	9.850	9.750	9.800	9.850	19.650
4	Mary Lou Retton (USA)	9.850	9.750	9.800	9.750	19.550
5	Ma Yanhong (CHN)	9.700	9.800	9.750	9.700	19.450
6	Romi Kessler (SUI)	9.500	9.700	9.600	9.750	19.350
7	Anja Wilhelm (FRG)	9.400	9.700	9.550	9.650	19.200
7	Chen Yongyan (CHN)	9.550	9.750	9.650	9.550	19.200

Preceded by Gymnastics at the 1980 Summer Olympics – Women's balance beam	Women's Balance Beam Event; 1984	Succeeded by Gymnastics at the 1988 Summer Olympics – Women's balance beam
