= Loredana Boboc =

Romanian artistic gymnast (born 1984)

- Nicknames: Bobo, Lori
- Born: 12 May 1984 (age 42) Bucharest
- Height: 1.43 m (4 ft 8 in)

Gymnastics career
- Discipline: Women's artistic gymnastics
- Country represented: Romania (1997-2001)
- Club: Steaua Bucharest
- Head coach: Octavian Belu
- Assistant coach: Mariana Bitang
- Retired: 2002
Medal record
Olympic Games
Gold medal – first place	2000 Sydney	Team
World Championships
Gold medal – first place	1999 Tianjin	Team
Gold medal – first place	2001 Ghent	Team
European Championships
Bronze medal – third place	2000 Paris	Team

Loredana Boboc (born 12 May 1984 in Bucharest, Romania) is a retired Romanian artistic gymnast. She represented Romania at the 2000 Summer Olympics and won a gold medal with her team. She was a member of the gold medal winning teams at the 1999 and 2001 World Championships.

Later in life she appeared in an episode of the TV series lubire ca in filme.
