= Mirela Țugurlan =

Romanian artistic gymnast

- Born: September 4, 1980 (age 46) Focșani, Romania

Gymnastics career
- Discipline: Women's artistic gymnastics
- Country represented: Romania
- Head coach: Octavian Belu
- Assistant coach: Mariana Bitang
Medal record
Representing Romania
Olympic Games
Bronze medal – third place	1996 Atlanta	Team
World Championships
Gold medal – first place	1997 Lausanne	Team

Mirela Țugurlan (born September 4, 1980) is a Romanian artistic gymnast.

== Early life ==
Țugurlan started gymnastics at age 7 and was selected to the junior Olympic team by age 12.

== Gymnastics career ==
She is a 1996 Olympic bronze medalist and a 1997 world gold medalist with the team. She was not originally expected to be a member of the Romanian Olympic team in Atlanta, but was added to the roster after Ana Maria Bican sustained a serious knee injury in training after having arrived in Atlanta. Despite her relative lack of experience competing at the international senior level, Țugurlan performed solidly on the Olympic stage and contributed to Romania's bronze medal finish. A year later at the world championships in Lausanne, Switzerland, Țugurlan helped the Romanian women win their third consecutive world team title.
