= Monica Roșu =

Romanian artistic gymnast

Monica Roşu
- Born: 11 May 1987 (age 39) Bacău, Romania

Gymnastics career
- Discipline: Women's artistic gymnastics
- Country represented: Romania (2000–05 (ROM))
- Head coaches: Octavian Belu and Mariana Bitang
- Retired: 2005
Medal record
Representing Romania
Olympic Games
Gold medal – first place	2004 Athens	Team
Gold medal – first place	2004 Athens	Vault
World Championships
Silver medal – second place	2003 Anaheim	Team
European Championships
Gold medal – first place	2004 Amsterdam	Team
Gold medal – first place	2004 Amsterdam	Vault

Monica Roşu (born 11 May 1987) is a former artistic gymnast from Romania. During her career, she won two Olympic gold medals (team and vault), a silver medal with the Romanian team at world championships, and two gold medals at the European Championships (team and vault).

== Early life and career ==
Roşu was born in Bacău. She started gymnastics in 1991 at age four and trained during her early years at CSS Bacău. Roşu competed at the Top Gym Tournament in early 2000. When two juniors from Deva pulled out unexpectedly just days before the meet began, Roşu was selected as a last-minute replacement. Competing with an ankle injury, she finished 12th all-around. Roşu competed internationally in the Netherlands and Slovakia in 2001. Always a powerful tumbler, she made great strides in vaulting and floor exercise and soon moved with her teammates to the national training center in Deva. Still a junior in 2002, she competed at the Romanian International, placing fourth. She went on to be a part of the junior squad at the European Championships, where she earned bronze medals on vault and floor exercise. At her second and last participation at the Top Gym Tournament, she won the trophy ahead of teammate Alexandra Eremia.

== Senior career ==
Roşu competed at her first world championships in the United States in 2003, winning silver with her team and placing fourth on the vault. She then won gold on vault and with the team at the European Championships the following spring. Roşu's finest hour came during the 2004 Olympics in Athens. With Cătălina Ponor, Daniela Sofronie, Oana Ban, Alexandra Eremia and Silvia Stroescu, she helped Romania defend its Olympic team title. In a dominant performance, they won by nearly a full point and finished first on three of the four apparatus. The strongest vaulter on the team, Roşu contributed scores in the finals of 9.625 on vault and 9.387 on bars. She also won gold on the vault, competing the two most difficult vaults of the Olympic Games. She scored 9.575 (start value: 9.9) and 9.737 (start value: 10.0). She was nearly two tenths ahead of her nearest rival, Annia Hatch of the United States.

== Retirement ==
After injuring herself in 2005 and showing sub-par performances, Roşu failed to make the 2005 World Championship team and has since retired. In 2005, she participated in the televised competition Kunoichi and the TV show Monster Box in Japan. In 2009, she was the host of a TV show ("Forma Maxima") aimed at promoting a healthy lifestyle, broadcast by the Romanian TVR1 channel. Among her guests were Ion Țiriac, Ilie Năstase and Gheorghe Hagi. As of 2010, Roşu was studying for her master's in sport management in Bucharest, Romania.

== Achievements ==
- 2000 Top Gym Tournament: 6th Team, 12th A-A, 6th BB 12th FX, 6 V
- 2001 Tournament of Arques: 3rd A-A
- 2001 Slovakian International: 4th A-A, 6th BB, 7th UB, 7th FX
- 2001 Hypotheek Tournament: 2nd A-A

She won a silver medal on vault at the 2004 World Cup Final.
