= Gymnastics at the 1988 Summer Olympics – Women's vault =

Women's vault at the Games of the XXIV Olympiad
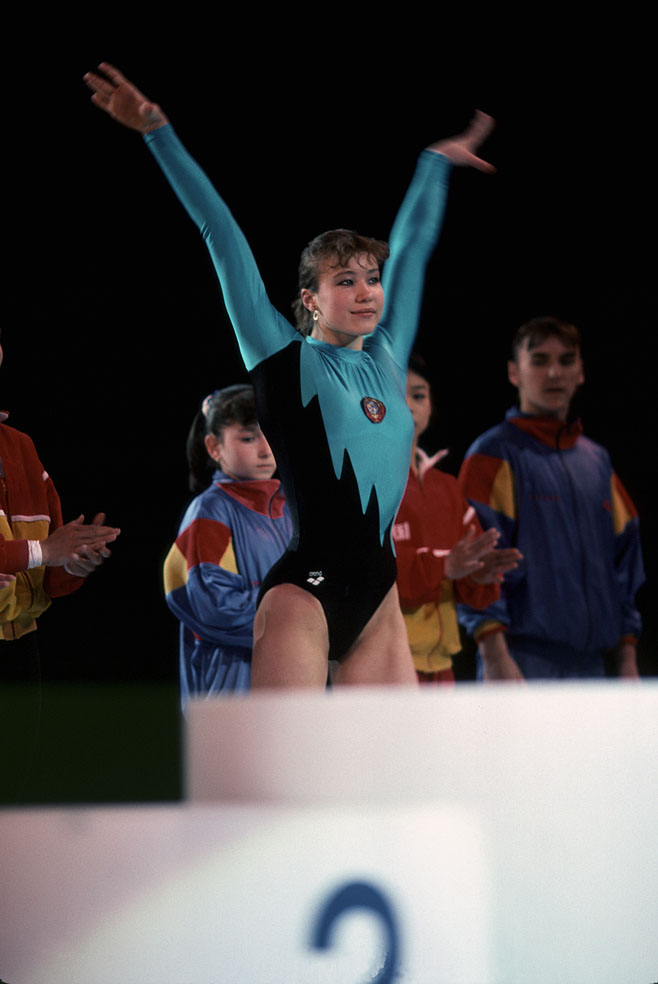
- Gold medalist Svetlana Boginskaya (1990)

Medalists
| 1st place, gold medalist(s) | | Svetlana Boginskaya | Soviet Union |
| 2nd place, silver medalist(s) | | Gabriela Potorac | Romania |
| 3rd place, bronze medalist(s) | | Daniela Silivaş | Romania |

These are the results of the women's vault competition, one of six events for female competitors in artistic gymnastics at the 1988 Summer Olympics in Seoul. The qualification and final rounds took place on September 19, 21 and 25th at the Olympic Gymnastics Hall.

== Results ==
=== Qualification ===
The team competition was also the qualifying competition for the all-around and apparatus events. Eighty-six gymnasts competed in the vault event during the compulsory and optional rounds (of the team event) on September 19 and 21. In the compulsory round each gymnast had one vault, while in the optionals, each had two, with only the best one to count. The gymnasts best optional vault was added to her compulsory vault to give the total preliminary (prelim) score (maximum 20.00). The eight highest scoring gymnasts advanced to the final on September 25. Each country was limited to two competitors in the final. Each gymnast carried over half of her preliminary points to the final. This constitutes the "prelim" score. In the final each gymnast had two vaults which had to be different, with the gymnasts score being the average of the two. This final score was then added to her prelim score to give the final result.

=== Final ===
| Rank | Gymnast | C | O | C+O | Prelim | Final | Total |
|---|---|---|---|---|---|---|---|
| Gold medal | Svetlana Boginskaya (URS) | 9.900 | 9.975 | 19.875 | 9.937 | 9.968 | 19.880 |
| Silver medal | Gabriela Potorac (ROU) | 9.800 | 9.975 | 19.775 | 9.887 | 9.943 | 19.830 |
| Bronze medal | Daniela Silivaş (ROU) | 9.900 | 9.900 | 19.800 | 9.900 | 9.918 | 19.818 |
| 4 | Boriana Stoyanova (BUL) | 9.850 | 9.975 | 19.825 | 9.912 | 9.868 | 19.780 |
| 5 | Brandy Johnson (USA) | 9.850 | 9.800 | 19.650 | 9.825 | 9.949 | 19.774 |
| 6 | Dagmar Kersten (GDR) | 9.800 | 9.950 | 19.750 | 9.875 | 9.881 | 19.756 |
| 7 | Wang Xiaoyan (CHN) | 9.775 | 9.900 | 19.675 | 9.837 | 9.893 | 19.730 |
| 8 | Elena Shushunova (URS) | 10.000 | 10.000 | 20.000 | 10.000 | 9.712 | 19.712 |
