= Rodica Dunca =

Romanian gymnast

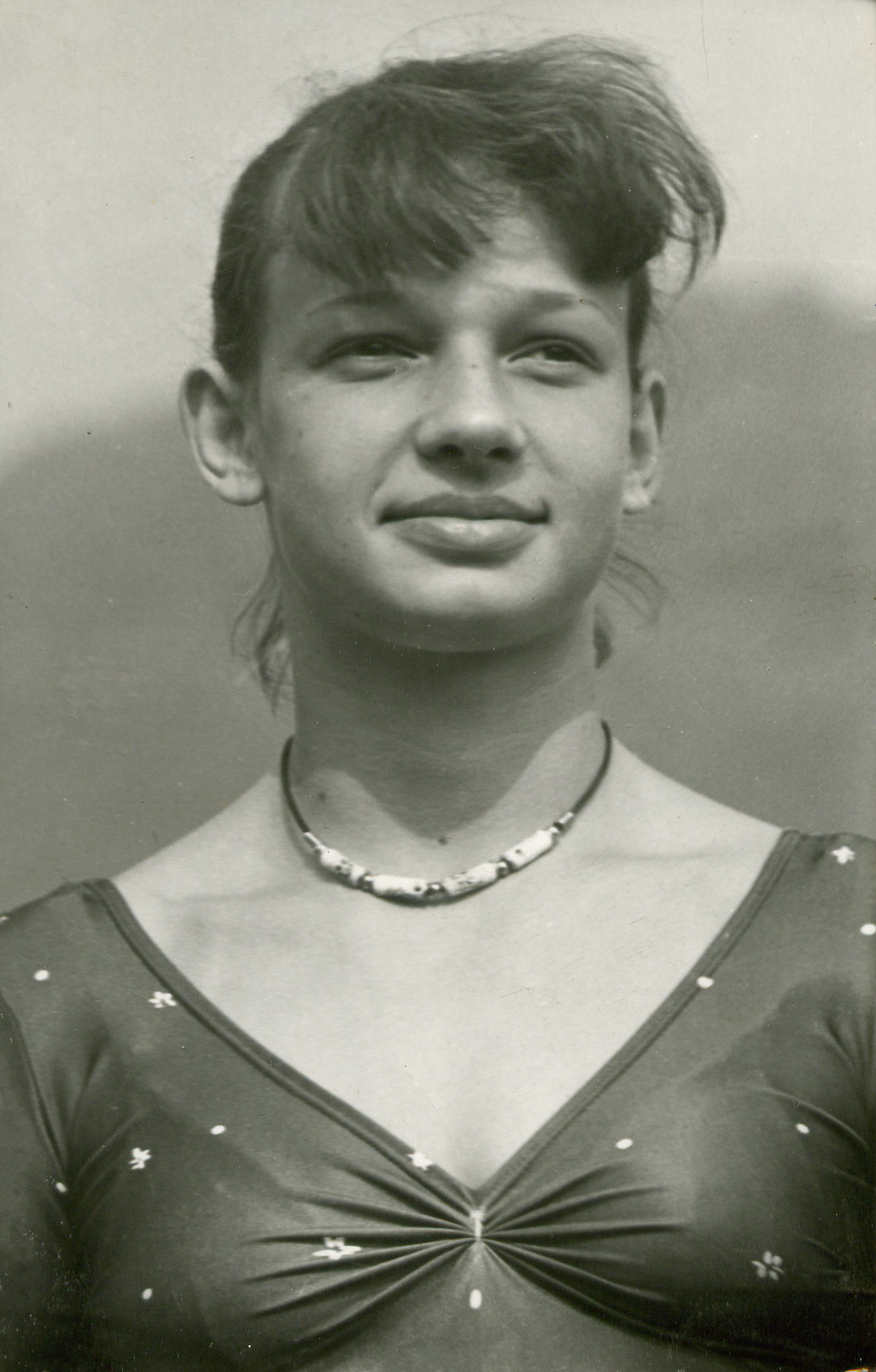

Personal information
- Born: 16 May 1965 (age 61) Baia Mare, Romania
- Height: 158 cm (5 ft 2 in)

Gymnastics career
- Discipline: Women's artistic gymnastics
- Country represented: Romania
- Head coaches: Béla Károlyi; Márta Károlyi
- Former coaches: Elena Marinescu; Alexandru Aldea
Medal record
Olympic Games
Silver medal – second place	1980 Moscow	Team
World Championships
Gold medal – first place	1979 Fort Worth	Team
European Championships
Bronze medal – third place	1981 Madrid	Beam

Rodica Dunca (originally Kőszegi, after marriage Pap Dunca, born 16 May 1965) is a retired Romanian artistic gymnast. She won the world team title in 1979 and an Olympic silver medal in 1980 as a member of the Romanian team. Individually, she won a European bronze medal on the balance beam in 1981.

== Career ==
Dunca's family name was changed from Kőszegi in September 1976, allegedly to sound more Romanian (Kőszegi being a Hungarian name). At that time, she was trying out for the national team.

Dunca attended the 1979 World Championships, where she and the rest of the Romanian team won gold. Individually, she was 5th in the all-around. The next year, she competed at the 1980 Summer Olympics, where the Romanian team won silver, and Dunca placed 7th. She competed at her only European Championships in 1981, where she won bronze on the balance beam and took 4th place in the all-around. At the 1981 Summer Universiade, she won gold in the team event and silver on the balance beam, and she was again 4th in the all-around. Her last competition was the 1982 FIG Artistic Gymnastics World Cup; she finished in 14th place.

In 2002, Dunca gave an interview to ProSport in which she recalled her time training in Deva, which she called a "concentration camp". She alleged that Romanian head coach Béla Károlyi starved gymnasts, forbid them from drinking water until they were so thirsty that they drank from toilet tanks, and physically abused gymnasts. She said that in 1980 or 1981, she and Melitta Rühn as well as Teodora Ungureanu ran away, but they were caught in Dej by the Securitate and forced to return. Afterward, the windows were nailed shut, and the Securitate threatened the gymnasts with harm to their families. She also recalled being forced to take dozens of unknown pills a day.

In the same interview, Dunca said that she and the other gymnasts begged Nadia Comăneci to let them open her fan mail for her. If foreign currency was included, Comăneci let the other gymnasts keep it.

== Post-gymnastics career ==
After retiring from competition, she worked as a gymnastics coach at CSM Baia Mare and then at a local theater. In September 2025, she released a book about gymnastics in her hometown.
