= Gymnastics at the 1988 Summer Olympics – Women's balance beam =

Women's balance beam at the Games of the XXIV Olympiad
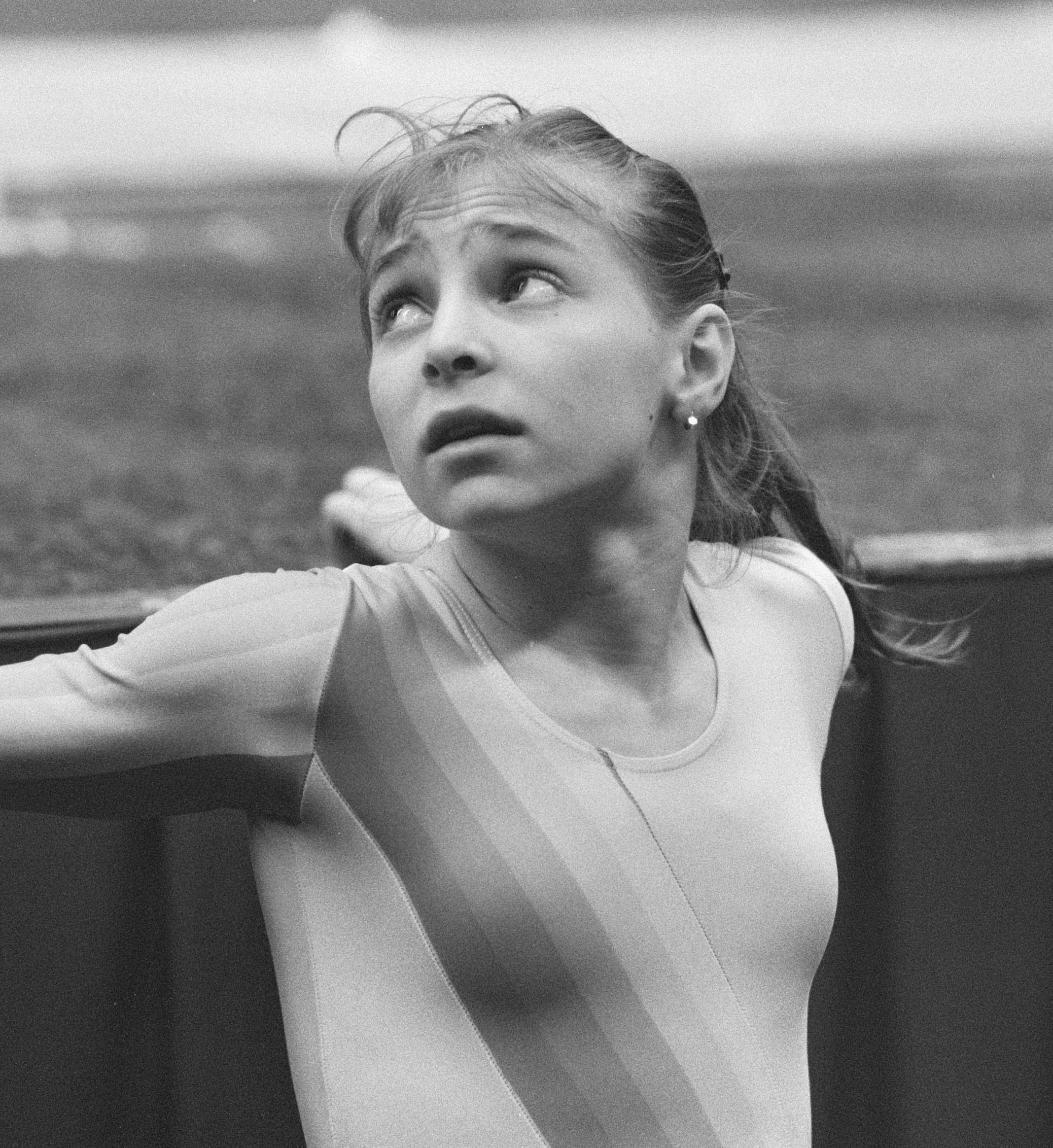
- Gold medalist Daniela Silivaş (1987)

Medalists
1st place, gold medalist(s)		Daniela Silivas	Romania
2nd place, silver medalist(s)		Elena Shushunova	Soviet Union
3rd place, bronze medalist(s)		Gabriela Potorac	Romania
3rd place, bronze medalist(s)		Phoebe Mills	United States

These are the results of the women's balance beam competition, one of six events for female competitors in artistic gymnastics at the 1988 Summer Olympics in Seoul. The qualification and final rounds took place on September 19, 21 and 25 at the Olympic Gymnastics Hall.

== Results ==
=== Qualification ===
Eighty-six gymnasts competed in the balance beam event during the compulsory and optional rounds on September 19 and 21. The eight highest-scoring gymnasts advanced to the final on September 25. Each country was limited to two competitors in the final. Half of the points earned by each gymnast during both the compulsory and optional rounds carried over to the final. This constitutes the "prelim" score.

=== Final ===
Rank	Gymnast	C	O	C+O	Prelim	Final	Total
Gold medal	Daniela Silivaş (ROU)	9.875	10.000	19.875	9.937	9.987	19.924
Silver medal	Elena Shushunova (URS)	9.900	9.950	19.850	9.925	9.950	19.875
Bronze medal	Gabriela Potorac (ROU)	9.875	9.900	19.775	9.887	9.950	19.837
Bronze medal	Phoebe Mills (USA)	9.850	9.900	19.750	9.875	9.962	19.837
5	Svetlana Boginskaya (URS)	9.900	9.975	19.875	9.937	9.850	19.787
6	Diana Doudeva (BUL)	9.725	9.900	19.625	9.812	9.912	19.724
7	Kelly Garrison-Steves (USA)	9.775	9.800	19.575	9.787	9.862	19.649
8	Ulrike Klotz (GDR)	9.750	9.850	19.600	9.800	8.325	18.125
