= Gymnastics at the 1992 Summer Olympics – Women's floor =

Women's floor at the Games of the XXV Olympiad
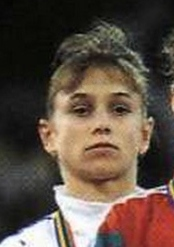
- Gold medalist Lavinia Miloșovici (1992)
- Venue: Palau Sant Jordi
- Date: 28 July – 1 August 1992
- Competitors: 92 from 24 nations

Medalists
1st place, gold medalist(s)		Lavinia Miloșovici	Romania
2nd place, silver medalist(s)		Henrietta Ónodi	Hungary
3rd place, bronze medalist(s)		Shannon Miller	United States
3rd place, bronze medalist(s)		Cristina Bontaș	Romania
3rd place, bronze medalist(s)		Tatiana Gutsu	Unified Team

These are the results of the women's floor competition, one of six events for female competitors in artistic gymnastics at the 1992 Summer Olympics in Barcelona. The qualification and final rounds took place on July 28 and August 1, 1992 at the Palau Sant Jordi.

== Results ==
=== Qualification ===
Ninety gymnasts competed in the floor event during the compulsory and optional rounds on July 26 and 28. The eight highest scoring gymnasts advanced to the final on August 1. Each country was limited to two competitors in the final.

Rank	Gymnast	Score
1	Svetlana Boginskaya (EUN)	19.900
1	Cristina Bontaș (ROU)	19.900
3	Henrietta Ónodi (HUN)	19.862
3	Lavinia Miloșovici (ROU)	19.862
5	Tatiana Gutsu (EUN)	19.850
5	Kim Zmeskal (USA)	19.850
8	Shannon Miller (USA)	19.787
11	Sylvia Mitova (BUL)	19.762

=== Final ===
Rank	Gymnast	Score
Gold medal	Lavinia Miloșovici (ROU)	10.000
Silver medal	Henrietta Ónodi (HUN)	9.950
Bronze medal	Shannon Miller (USA)	9.912
Bronze medal	Cristina Bontaș (ROU)	9.912
Bronze medal	Tatiana Gutsu (EUN)	9.912
6	Kim Zmeskal (USA)	9.900
7	Oksana Chusovitina (EUN)	9.812
8	Sylvia Mitova (BUL)	9.400
