= Olga Göllner =

Romanian gymnast

Personal information
- Nationality: Romanian
- Born: 8 November 1930; Cluj-Napoca, Romania
- Died: 12 November 2017 (aged 87); Fürth, Bavaria, Germany

Sport
- Sport: Gymnastics

Olga Göllner (born 8 November 1930 – 12 November 2017) was a Romanian gymnast. She competed in seven events at the 1952 Summer Olympics.
