= Gymnastics at the 1996 Summer Olympics – Women's vault =

Women's vault at the Games of the XXVI Olympiad
- Pictogram for Gymnastics

Medalists
1st place, gold medalist(s)		Simona Amânar	Romania
2nd place, silver medalist(s)		Mo Huilan	China
3rd place, bronze medalist(s)		Gina Gogean	Romania

These are the results of the women's vault competition, one of six events for female competitors in artistic gymnastics at the 1996 Summer Olympics in Atlanta. The qualification and final rounds took place on July 21, 22 and 28th at the Georgia Dome.

== Results ==
=== Qualification ===
Ninety-one gymnasts competed in the vault event during the compulsory and optional rounds on July 21 and 23. The eight highest scoring gymnasts advanced to the final on July 28. Each country was limited to two competitors in the final.

Rank	Gymnast	Score
1	Simona Amânar (ROU)	19.675
2	Gina Gogean (ROU)	19.637
3	Mo Huilan (CHN)	19.537
4	Kerri Strug* (USA)	19.524
5	Rozalia Galiyeva (RUS)	19.512
6	Elena Grosheva (RUS)	19.500
7	Dominique Dawes (USA)	19.487
8	Svetlana Boginskaya (BLR)	19.474
9	Shannon Miller** (USA)	19.462

* Did not participate due to injury
** Replaced injured teammate Kerri Strug

=== Final ===
Rank	Gymnast	Score
Gold medal	Simona Amânar (ROU)	9.825
Silver medal	Mo Huilan (CHN)	9.768
Bronze medal	Gina Gogean (ROU)	9.750
4	Rozalia Galiyeva (RUS)	9.743
5	Svetlana Boginskaya (BLR)	9.712
6	Dominique Dawes (USA)	9.649
7	Elena Grosheva (RUS)	9.637
8	Shannon Miller (USA)	9.350
