= Gymnastics at the 1976 Summer Olympics – Women's balance beam =

Women's balance beam at the Games of the XXI Olympiad
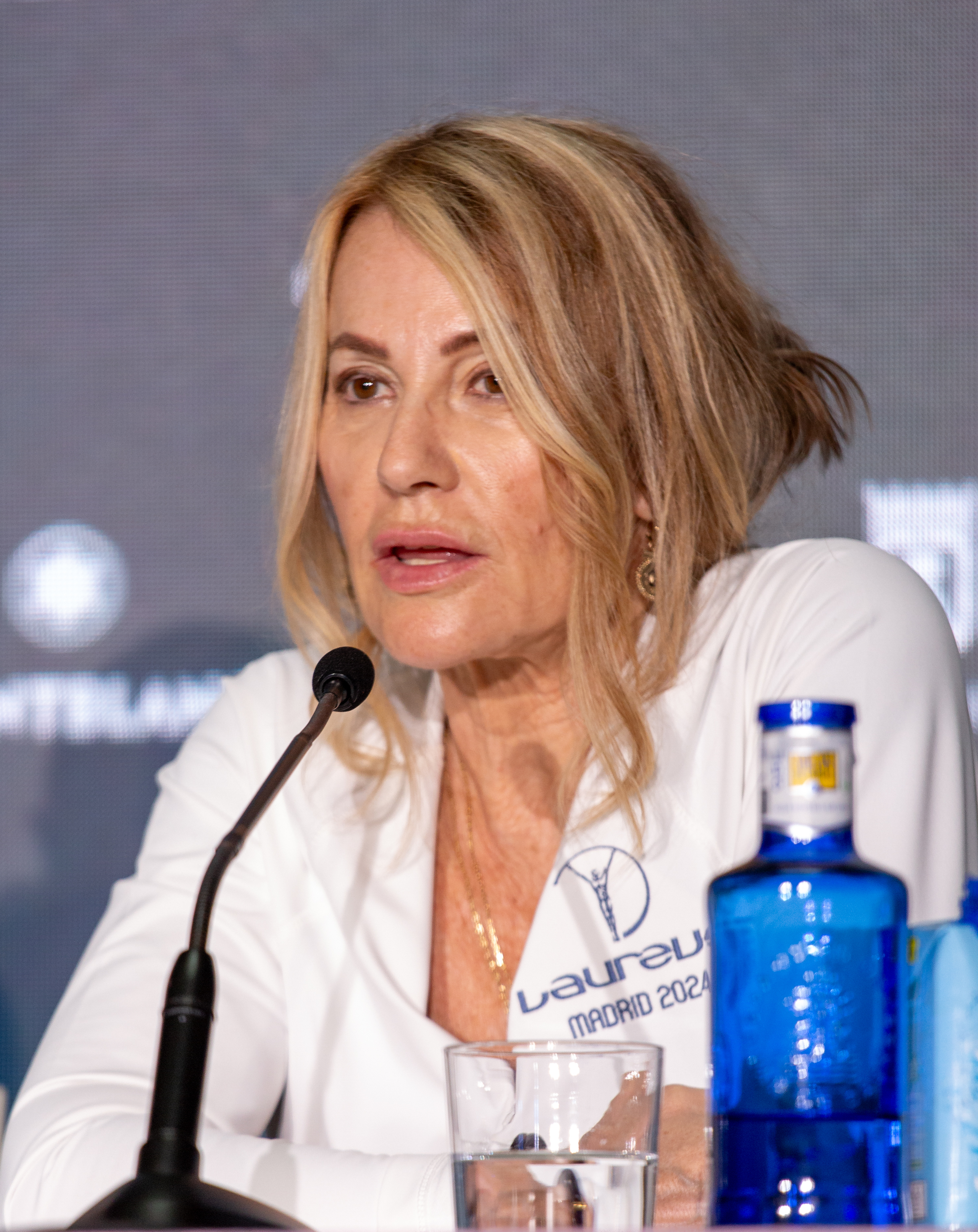
- Gold medalist Nadia Comăneci (2024)

Medalists
1st place, gold medalist(s)		Nadia Comăneci	Romania
2nd place, silver medalist(s)		Olga Korbut	Soviet Union
3rd place, bronze medalist(s)		Teodora Ungureanu	Romania

These are the results of the women's balance beam competition, one of six events for female competitors in artistic gymnastics at the 1976 Summer Olympics in Montreal. The qualification and final rounds took place on July 18, 19, and 22 at the Montreal Forum.

== Results ==
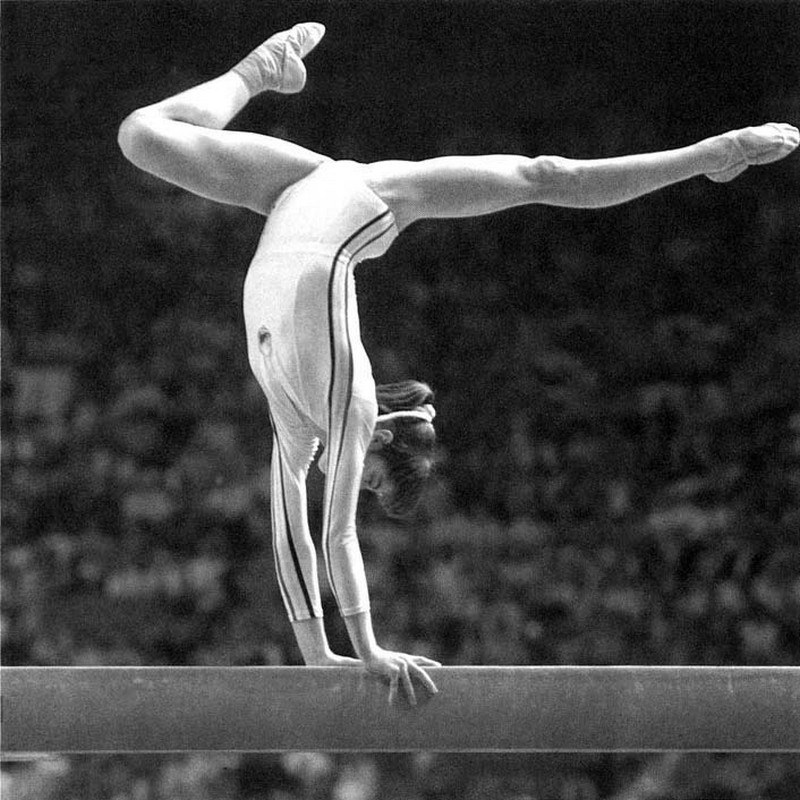
Nadia Comăneci on balance beam at the 1976 Summer Olympics

=== Qualification ===
Eighty-six gymnasts competed in the compulsory and optional rounds on July 18 and 19. The six highest scoring gymnasts advanced to the final on July 22. Each country was limited to two competitors in the final. Half of the points earned by each gymnast during both the compulsory and optional rounds carried over to the final. This constitutes the "prelim" score.

=== Final ===
Rank	Gymnast	C	O	Prelim	Final	Total
Gold medal	Nadia Comăneci (ROU)	9.900	10.000	9.950	10.000	19.950
Silver medal	Olga Korbut (URS)	9.800	9.850	9.825	9.900	19.725
Bronze medal	Teodora Ungureanu (ROU)	9.750	9.850	9.800	9.900	19.700
4	Ludmilla Tourischeva (URS)	9.400	9.850	9.625	9.850	19.475
5	Angelika Hellmann (GDR)	9.500	9.600	9.550	9.900	19.450
6	Gitta Escher (GDR)	9.500	9.650	9.575	9.700	19.275
