= Anca Grigoraș =

Romanian gymnast (born 1957)

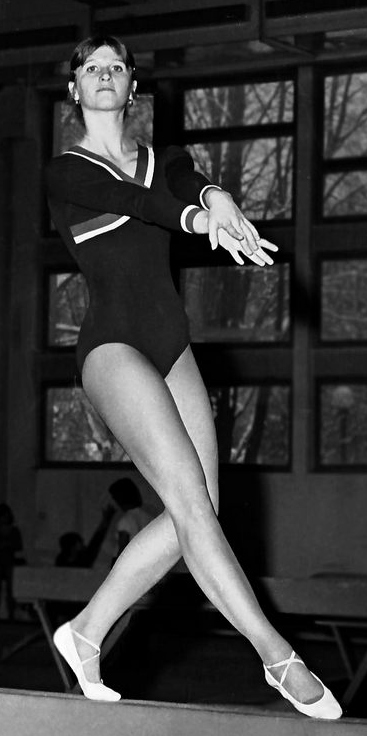

Personal information
- Full name: Anca Gabriela Grigoraș
- Born: 8 November 1957 (age 68) Comănești, Romania
- Height: 167 cm (5 ft 6 in)

Gymnastics career
- Discipline: Women's artistic gymnastics
- Country represented: Romania
- Club: CS Dinamo București
Medal record
Olympic Games
Silver medal – second place	1976 Montreal	Team
World Championships
Silver medal – second place	1978 Strasbourg	Team
European Championships
Bronze medal – third place	1973 London	Beam

Anca Gabriela Grigoraș (later Mihăilescu, born 8 November 1957) is a retired Romanian artistic gymnast who won team silver medals at the 1976 Olympics and the 1978 World Championships. Individually, she was a European bronze medalist on balance beam in 1973.

She began her training at the Onesti "Flacara" (The Flame) sports club at age 9, and in 1972 moved to CS Dinamo Bucuresti. While at Flacara Onesti, she was twice Romanian national champion, in 1972 and 1973.

After retiring from competition, Grigoraș coached gymnasts at her native club, Dinamo Bucharest. Since 1990, she has been a national coach and a technical director at the Romanian Gymnastics Federation. She is also an international referee, and has been a member of the UEG Women's Technical Committee. She has received the honors of Master Emeritus of Sport, Trainer Emeritus, and the National Cross for "Faithful Service", II-a class
