= Mihaela Stănuleț =

Romanian artistic gymnast

Mihaela Stănuleţ
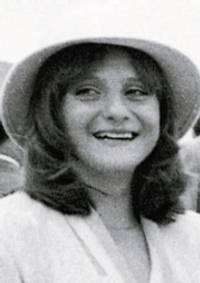
- Stănuleț in the 1980s

Personal information
- Born: 16 July 1967 (age 59) Sibiu, Romania
- Height: 152 cm (5 ft 0 in)

Gymnastics career
- Discipline: Women's artistic gymnastics
- Country represented: Romania (1979–1984)
- Club: CSŞ Sibiu
- Head coaches: Adrian Goreac; Maria Cosma; Octavian Bellu; Adrian Stan
- Former coach: Nicolae Buzoianu
Medal record
Olympic Games
Gold medal – first place	1984 Los Angeles	Team all-around
World Championships
Silver medal – second place	1983 Budapest	Team all-around
European Championships
Bronze medal – third place	1983 Göteborg	Balance beam

Mihaela Stănuleţ (born 16 July 1967) is a retired Romanian artistic gymnast who competed internationally between 1979 and 1984. She is an Olympic gold medalist and a world silver medalist with the team. Individually, she won a bronze medal on the beam at the 1983 European Championships and placed fourth on the uneven bars at the 1984 Olympic Games. After retiring from competitions, she became a coach at CSŞ Sibiu. Her trainees included Steliana Nistor.
