= Alina Goreac =

Romanian artistic gymnast

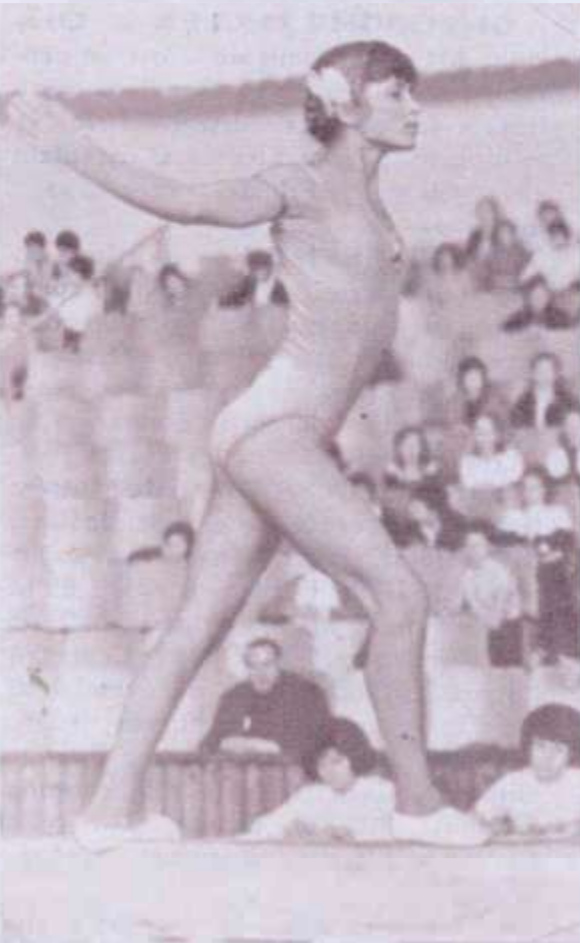
- Alina Goreac 1968

Personal information
- Born: 28 September 1952 (age 73) Lugoj

Gymnastics career
- Discipline: Women's artistic gymnastics
- Country represented: Romania
- Club: CSS Dinamo
- Head coach: Béla Károlyi
- Assistant coach: Marta Károlyi
- Former coaches: Nicolae Covaci, Atanasia Ionescu Albu
Medal record
European Championships
Silver medal – second place	1973 London	Balance beam
Bronze medal – third place	1973 London	Floor exercise
Bronze medal – third place	1973 London	Uneven bars
Bronze medal – third place	1975 Skien	Vault
Bronze medal – third place	1975 Skien	Balance beam
Summer Universiade
Gold medal – first place	1977 Sofia	All-around
Silver medal – second place	1977 Sofia	Team

Alina Goreac (born 28 September 1952) is a retired Romanian artistic gymnast who represented Romania at the 1972 Olympic Games. During her career she medaled on all four events (floor, balance beam, vault and uneven bars) at European championships and was the 1977 University Games all around and uneven bars champion. Since 1981 she has been a gymnastics coach.
