= Teofila Băiașu =

Romanian gymnast (1927–2002)

Personal information
- Nationality: Romanian
- Born: 25 July 1927
- Died: 27 March 2002 (aged 74) Bucharest, Romania

Sport
- Sport: Gymnastics

Teofila Băiașu (25 July 1927 – 27 March 2002) was a Romanian gymnast. She competed in seven events at the 1952 Summer Olympics in Helsinki, Finland. She also participated in the 1954 World Artistic Gymnastics Championships in Rome, Italy, and in the 1956 Summer Olympics held in Melbourne, Australia, as part of the Romanian gymnastics team. Băiașu died in Bucharest on 27 March 2002, at the age of 74.
