= Helga Bîrsan =

Romanian gymnast (1928–2004)

Personal information
- Full name: Helga Anelise Bîrsan
- Nationality: Romanian
- Born: 29 June 1928; Buziaș, Romania
- Died: 30 June 2004 (aged 76); Galați, Romania

Sport
- Sport: Gymnastics

Helga Bîrsan (29 June 1928 – April 2004) was a Romanian gymnast. She competed in seven events at the 1952 Summer Olympics.
