= Uta Poreceanu =

Romanian artistic gymnast (1936–2018)

- Full name: Uta Poreceanu-Schlandt
- Born: 13 November 1936 Braşov
- Died: 27 January 2018 (aged 81)

Gymnastics career
- Discipline: Women's artistic gymnastics
- Country represented: Romania
Medal record
Summer Olympics
Bronze medal – third place	1960 Rome	Team competition

Uta Poreceanu-Schlandt (13 November 1936 – 27 January 2018) was a Romanian artistic gymnast. Born in Braşov, Romania, she was an Olympic bronze medalist with the team.
