= Gymnastics at the 1976 Summer Olympics – Women's uneven bars =

Women's uneven bars at the Games of the XXI Olympiad
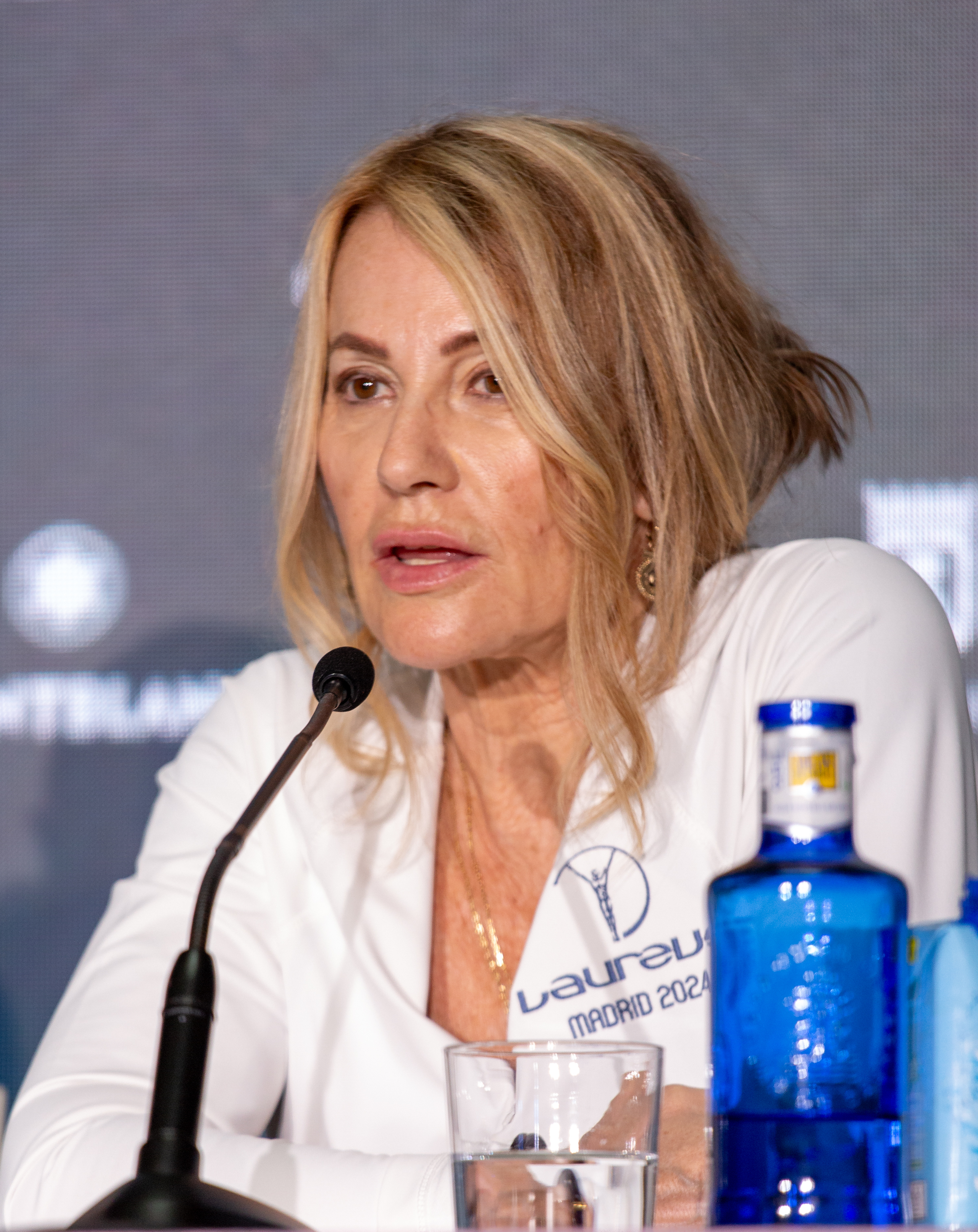
- Gold medalist Nadia Comăneci (2024)

Medalists
1st place, gold medalist(s)		Nadia Comăneci	Romania
2nd place, silver medalist(s)		Teodora Ungureanu	Romania
3rd place, bronze medalist(s)		Márta Egervári	Hungary

These are the results of the women's uneven bars competition, one of six events for female competitors in artistic gymnastics at the 1976 Summer Olympics in Montreal. The qualification and final rounds took place on July 18, 19, and 22nd at the Montreal Forum. It is particularly remembered for the first ever Perfect 10 in Gymnastics at the Olympic Games. Nadia Comăneci of Romania, who was only 14 at the time managed a perfect score, in the compulsory team round. The scoreboard had been designed with only three digits due to the apparent impossibility of a perfect score, so at the time, it only read, "1.00". Nadia would later follow her first perfect score with two others in the optional round and the final, to finish on a perfect score of 20.

== Results ==
=== Qualification ===
Eighty-six gymnasts competed in the compulsory and optional rounds on July 18 and 19. The six highest scoring gymnasts advanced to the final on July 22. Each country was limited to two competitors in the final. Half of the points earned by each gymnast during both the compulsory and optional rounds carried over to the final. This constitutes the "prelim" score.

=== Final ===
Rank	Gymnast	C	O	Prelim	Final	Total
Gold medal	Nadia Comăneci (ROU)	10.000	10.000	10.000	10.000	20.000
Silver medal	Teodora Ungureanu (ROU)	9.900	9.900	9.900	9.900	19.800
Bronze medal	Márta Egervári (HUN)	9.850	9.900	9.875	9.900	19.775
4	Marion Kische (GDR)	9.900	9.900	9.900	9.850	19.750
5	Olga Korbut (URS)	9.900	9.900	9.900	9.400	19.300
6	Nellie Kim (URS)	9.800	9.850	9.825	9.400	19.225
