= Atanasia Ionescu =

Romanian artistic gymnast

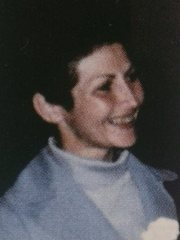

Personal information
- Full name: Atanasia Ionescu-Albu
- Born: 19 March 1935 Ploieşti, Romania
- Died: 7 March 1990 (aged 54) Bucharest, Romania

Gymnastics career
- Discipline: Women's artistic gymnastics
Medal record
Representing Romania
Olympic Games
Bronze medal – third place	1960 Rome	Team competition
World Championships
Bronze medal – third place	1958 Moscow	Team competition

Atanasia Ionescu (later Albu, 19 March 1935 – 7 March 1990) was a Romanian artistic gymnast. She competed at the 1958 World Championships and 1960 and 1964 Olympics and won team bronze medals in 1958 and 1960. After retiring from competitions she worked as a gymnastics coach and international referee.
