= Elena Ceampelea =

Romanian artistic gymnast

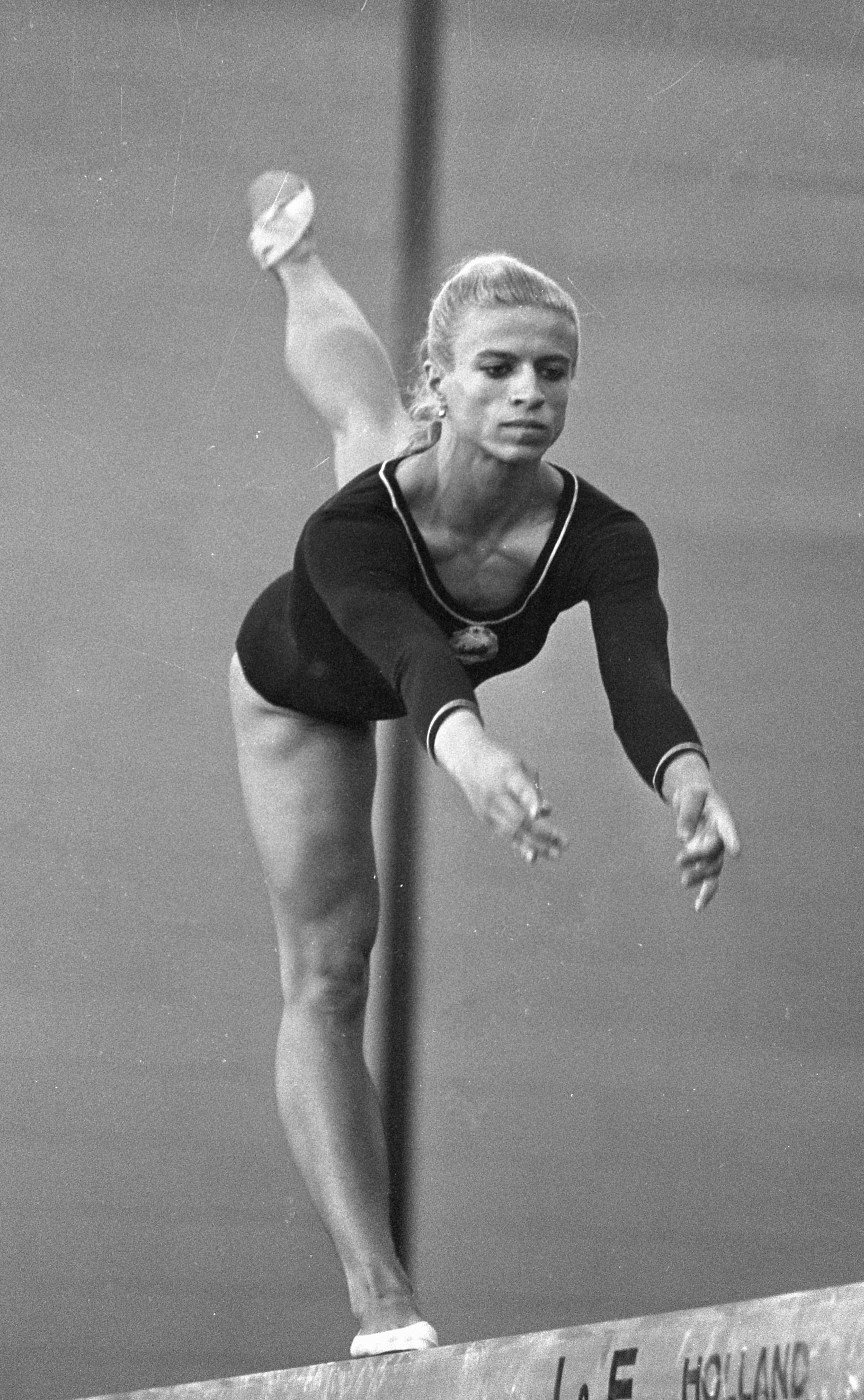
- Elena Ceampelea in 1968

Personal information
- Born: 3 February 1947 (age 79) Ploieşti, Romania
- Height: 1.59 m (5 ft 3 in)
- Weight: 52 kg (115 lb)

Sport
- Sport: Artistic gymnastics

Elena Ceampelea (born 3 February 1947) is a Romanian former artistic gymnast. She competed at the 1964 and 1972 Summer Olympics and both times finished in sixth place all-around with the Romanian team. Her best personal achievement was eighth place in the floor exercise in 1972.
