= Gabriela Potorac =

Romanian artistic gymnast

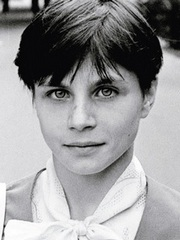

Personal information
- Born: 6 February 1973 (age 53) Bacău, Romania
- Height: 144 cm (4 ft 9 in)

Gymnastics career
- Discipline: Women's artistic gymnastics
- Country represented: Romania
- Club: CS Bacău; Deva
- Head coaches: Adrian Goreac, Maria Cosma, Octavian Bellu, Adrian Stan
- Former coaches: Marina and Mircea Bibire
Medal record
Olympic Games
Silver medal – second place	1988 Seoul	Team
Silver medal – second place	1988 Seoul	Vault
Bronze medal – third place	1988 Seoul	Balance Beam
World Championships
Silver medal – second place	1989 Stuttgart	Team
Bronze medal – third place	1989 Stuttgart	Balance beam
European Championships
Gold medal – first place	1989 Brussels	Balance beam

Gabriela Potorac (born 6 February 1973) is a Romanian former artistic gymnast. At the 1988 Summer Olympics in Seoul, she won three medals: a team silver, a silver on vault with a score of 19.830, and a bronze on balance beam with a score of 19.837. At the 1989 World Championships, she won the bronze medal on balance beam with a score of 9.887.

Although she was overshadowed in event finals in Seoul on Balance Beam by her famous teammate Daniela Silivaș, she did end up tying USA gymnast Phoebe Mills for bronze on that apparatus. A lesser-known fact is that, earlier, in the all-around competition (where she placed 4th), although the balance beam was the only apparatus where there was no 'perfect' score of 10 in that segment of the competition, her score of 9.95 was the single-highest mark awarded.

At the 1989 World Championships, she won the bronze medal on balance beam with a score of 9.887. Moreover, this same year, she became European champion, also, on the beam.

After retiring from competitions Potorac studied at the Sports University in Bucharest and coached at the club Triumf. In 1993 she moved to Japan to work as a gymnastics coach and married there. She later divorced, but stayed in Japan, working as a coach and occasional Japanese-Romanian translator.
