= Marcela Păunescu =

Romanian gymnast

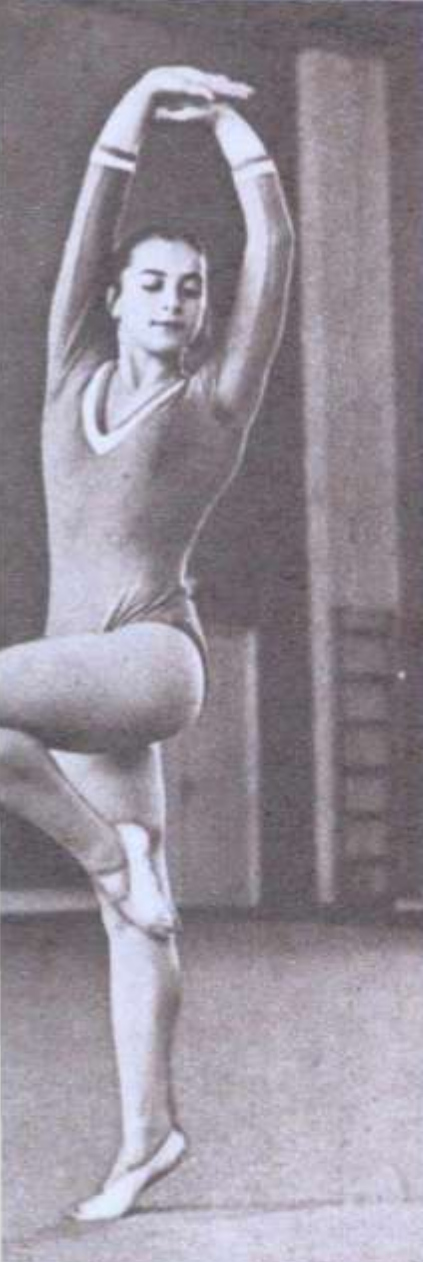
- Păunescu in 1972

Personal information
- Nationality: Romanian
- Born: 11 January 1955 (age 70); Craiova, Romania

Sport
- Sport: Gymnastics

Marcela Păunescu (born 11 January 1955) is a Romanian gymnast. She competed at the 1972 Summer Olympics.
