= Emilia Eberle =

Romanian gymnast

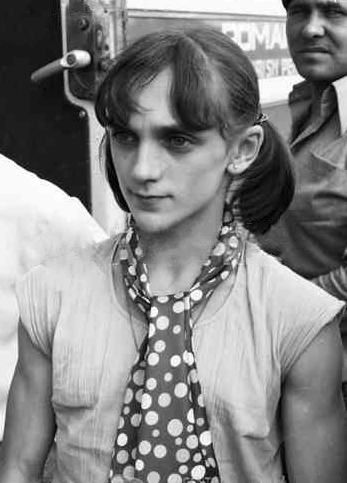
- Eberle in 1980

Personal information
- Full name: Gertrúd Emilia Eberle
- Born: 4 March 1964 (age 62) Arad, Romania
- Height: 153 cm (5 ft 0 in)

Gymnastics career
- Discipline: Women's artistic gymnastics
- Country represented: Romania (1976–1983)
- Gym: National Training Centre
- Head coaches: Béla Károlyi, Márta Károlyi
- Retired: 1983
Medal record
Olympic Games
Silver medal – second place	1980 Moscow	Team
Silver medal – second place	1980 Moscow	Uneven bars
World Championships
Gold medal – first place	1979 Fort Worth	Team
Gold medal – first place	1979 Fort Worth	Floor exercise
Silver medal – second place	1978 Strasbourg	Team
Bronze medal – third place	1978 Strasbourg	Uneven bars
Bronze medal – third place	1978 Strasbourg	Balance beam
Bronze medal – third place	1978 Strasbourg	Floor exercise
Bronze medal – third place	1979 Fort Worth	Uneven bars
European Championships
Silver medal – second place	1979 Copenhagen	All-around
Silver medal – second place	1979 Copenhagen	Uneven bars
Silver medal – second place	1979 Copenhagen	Balance beam
World Cup
Gold medal – first place	1979 Tokyo	Uneven Bars
Gold medal – first place	1979 Tokyo	Balance Beam
Silver medal – second place	1979 Tokyo	All-around
Bronze medal – third place	1979 Tokyo	Floor exercise

Trudi Kollar, born Gertrúd Emilia Eberle (Romanian pronunciation: [eˈmili.a ˈeberle] 4 March 1964) is a retired Romanian gymnast of German-Hungarian descent.

== Early life ==
Eberle was born in Arad, Romania with the name Gertrúd Emilia Eberle and nicknamed Trudi. As she became more well-known, the Romanian Federation called her Emilia, as it was thought to sound more Romanian.

== Career ==
Eberle took up gymnastics aged 7 following her mother. At the time she was coached by Judita Varkony and Pavel Rosenfeld, and later was trained by Béla Károlyi and Márta Károlyi, before they defected from Romania to the United States in 1981. She was included to the national team in 1976 and later became the first female Romanian gymnastics star to succeed Nadia Comăneci. She was often in Comăneci's shadow because, for the greater part of Eberle's career, they competed together. Despite this, she made a name for herself, garnering 13 individual medals at the European, world and Olympic level. Most notable among her accomplishments was winning the floor exercise at the 1979 World Artistic Gymnastics Championships, ahead of Nelli Kim and Maxi Gnauck, as well as earning a silver medal on uneven bars at the 1980 Olympics, where she was narrowly edged out by Gnauck.

Eberle was also on the gold-medal-winning team at the 1979 World Championships. Despite a fall on the balance beam in the team optional segment of the competition, her other scores were strong enough to keep the Romanian team in contention for the gold with the Soviet team. Ultimately, her compatriot Comăneci came back from an injury, taking only the compulsory segment of the team competition, and competed on the beam, where she earned a high score of 9.95, allowing the Romanians to drop Eberle's lower score and win the gold medal. It was a rare victory for the Romanians over the Soviet team, and one of the Soviets' only three World Championship or Olympic title losses between 1952, when a full women's gymnastics program was first held at the Olympic Games, and 1992, which was the last appearance of the unified Soviet team (under the guise of the Commonwealth of Independent States).

Although a strong gymnast all-around (she won all-around silver medals at the 1979 World Cup and European Championships), Eberle was especially noted for her work on the uneven bars, where her routines varied greatly from year to year and even from competition to competition. She often included very quick and unusual transitions from one bar to the other.

Eberle retired in 1983. She returned to her home club in Arad and felt that her scores were being artificially lowered, and she then had an appendectomy and could not train for two months. She had hoped to compete at the 1984 Summer Olympics.

== Later life ==
After her retirement, unable to obtain a coaching job, Eberle worked in a watch factory for two years. In 1985, she was able to begin coaching children.

Like the Károlyis, Comăneci, and others, Eberle left Romania, crossing the border illegally on foot in 1989. Eberle decided to leave as she could not obtain a passport. She left behind her family, who she did not tell about her plans to defect. In Hungary, she coached and lived with her mother's elderly aunt.

She moved to the United States in 1991. She is married and has a son, Roland, born in 1999. She coaches in California with a fellow expatriate Hungarian from Romania, the gymnastics coach and choreographer Géza Pozsár. In the US, she changed her name to Trudi Kollar.

In November 2008, Eberle gave an interview to KCRA-TV attesting that Béla and Márta Károlyi regularly beat her and her teammates for mistakes they made in practice or competition. "In one word, I can say it was brutal," she told KCRA.
