= Teodora Ungureanu =

Romanian gymnast

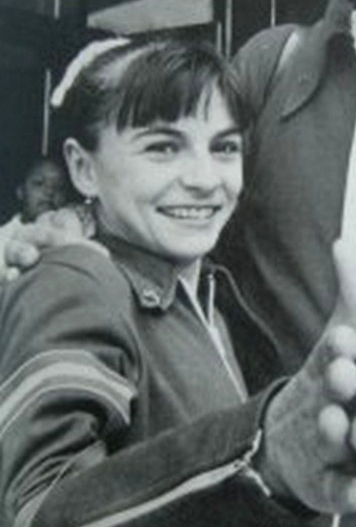
- Ungureanu in the 1970s

Personal information
- Full name: Teodora Ungureanu
- Born: 13 November 1960 (age 65) Reșița, People's Republic of Romania
- Height: 150 cm (4 ft 11 in)

Gymnastics career
- Discipline: Women's artistic gymnastics
- Country represented: Romania; (1971–1979)
- Gym: National Training Centre
- Head coach: Béla Károlyi
- Assistant coach: Márta Károlyi
- Former coach: Andrei Karekes
- Retired: 1979
Medal record
Olympic Games
Silver medal – second place	1976 Montreal	Team
Silver medal – second place	1976 Montreal	Uneven bars
Bronze medal – third place	1976 Montreal	Balance beam
World Championships
Silver medal – second place	1978 Strasbourg	Team

Teodora Ungureanu (born 13 November 1960) is a Romanian former gymnast who competed at the 1976 Summer Olympics. She is a three-time Olympic medalist (two silver and one bronze) and a world championships silver medalist. After retiring from gymnastics she has enjoyed a successful career as a gymnastics coach.

== Gymnastics career ==
Ungureanu began gymnastics at the age of nine. She trained in Bucharest until she was 12, when she joined the gymnastics school run by Béla Károlyi and his wife, Márta.

At her first Romanian National Championships, in 1971, she placed first in the all-around in the children's division. While Ungureanu was a skilled athlete, medalling at various World Cup and international events, she was frequently overshadowed by her more celebrated teammate and friend, Nadia Comăneci (who was born the day before Ungureanu's first birthday). She placed second to Comăneci at various events, including the Romanian Nationals. At the 1976 Summer Olympics, Ungureanu barely missed an all-around bronze, finishing fourth. She did win two individual medals in the event finals, a bronze on the balance beam and a silver on the uneven bars, and shared in the team's silver medal. Ungureanu's final meet was the 1979 World University Games, where she finished first in the all-around.

== Post-retirement ==
Following her retirement, she married Romanian Olympic gymnast Sorin Cepoi and began working with the Troup Cornea travelling circus. She and her husband eventually moved to France, where they coached for eight years before going to the United States in 1993. In 2001, she was inducted into the International Gymnastics Hall of Fame. Currently, Ungureanu and her husband own Dynamic Gymnastics club in Westchester, New York. Ungureanu coached four-year national team member and 2011 world champion Sabrina Vega until 2012 at Dynamic Gymnastics. Ungureanu is also rated as an International Gymnastics Official and serves as a judge at various competitions.

== Competitive history ==
Year	Event	Team	AA	VT	UB	BB	FX
Junior
1971	Romanian Junior Championships	1st place, gold medalist(s)	1st place, gold medalist(s)				
1972	Championships of the Republic	1st place, gold medalist(s)					
1972	Romanian Cup	1st place, gold medalist(s)	5				
1973	ITA-ROM Dual Meet	1st place, gold medalist(s)					
1973	Junior Friendship Tournament	3rd place, bronze medalist(s)	8		4	2nd place, silver medalist(s)	
1973	Romanian Junior Championships	1st place, gold medalist(s)	1st place, gold medalist(s)				
1973	Schools Championships		1st place, gold medalist(s)				
Senior
1974	Junior Friendship Tournament	1st place, gold medalist(s)	4			2nd place, silver medalist(s)	1st place, gold medalist(s)
1974	Romanian Junior Championships		2nd place, silver medalist(s)				
1975	Balkan Championships		2nd place, silver medalist(s)				
1975	Championships of the Republic		2nd place, silver medalist(s)				
1975	FRG-ROM Dual Meet	1st place, gold medalist(s)	2nd place, silver medalist(s)				
1975	Japan Junior Invitational		1st place, gold medalist(s)	1st place, gold medalist(s)	1st place, gold medalist(s)		1st place, gold medalist(s)
1975	Pre-Olympics		3rd place, bronze medalist(s)	5	4	2nd place, silver medalist(s)	3rd place, bronze medalist(s)
1975	Romanian Championships	1st place, gold medalist(s)	2nd place, silver medalist(s)	2nd place, silver medalist(s)	2nd place, silver medalist(s)	2nd place, silver medalist(s)	1st place, gold medalist(s)
1975	ROM-CAN Dual Meet	1st place, gold medalist(s)	2nd place, silver medalist(s)				
1975	ROM-ITA Dual Meet	1st place, gold medalist(s)	2nd place, silver medalist(s)				
1975	World Cup Final		6	4		6	2nd place, silver medalist(s)
1976	Calgary International			1st place, gold medalist(s)	1st place, gold medalist(s)	1st place, gold medalist(s)	1st place, gold medalist(s)
1976	CAN-ROM Dual Meet	1st place, gold medalist(s)	2nd place, silver medalist(s)				
1976	Champions All		1st place, gold medalist(s)				
1976	Chunichi Cup		2nd place, silver medalist(s)				
1976	FRA-ROM Dual Meet	1st place, gold medalist(s)	1st place, gold medalist(s)				
1976	FRG-ROM Dual Meet	1st place, gold medalist(s)	2nd place, silver medalist(s)				
1976	GBR-ROM Dual Meet	1st place, gold medalist(s)	2nd place, silver medalist(s)				
1976	NED-ROM Dual Meet	1st place, gold medalist(s)	2nd place, silver medalist(s)				
1976	Milan Grand Prix		1st place, gold medalist(s)				
1976	Milk Meet		1st place, gold medalist(s)				
1976	USA-ROM Dual Meet	1st place, gold medalist(s)	2nd place, silver medalist(s)				
1976	Romanian Championships		2nd place, silver medalist(s)	2nd place, silver medalist(s)	2nd place, silver medalist(s)	2nd place, silver medalist(s)	1st place, gold medalist(s)
1976	Olympic Games	2nd place, silver medalist(s)	4		2nd place, silver medalist(s)	3rd place, bronze medalist(s)	
1977	Champions All		1st place, gold medalist(s)				
1977	ESP-ROM Dual Meet (Barcelona)	1st place, gold medalist(s)	2nd place, silver medalist(s)				
1977	ESP-ROM Dual Meet (Madrid)	1st place, gold medalist(s)	2nd place, silver medalist(s)				
1977	European Championships		4	8	7		
1977	FRA-ROM Dual Meet	1st place, gold medalist(s)	2nd place, silver medalist(s)				
1977	International Championships of Romania		2nd place, silver medalist(s)	1st place, gold medalist(s)		2nd place, silver medalist(s)	2nd place, silver medalist(s)
1977	Orleans International		2nd place, silver medalist(s)				
1977	ROM-CAN Dual Meet	1st place, gold medalist(s)	2nd place, silver medalist(s)				
1978	Balkan Championships	1st place, gold medalist(s)	1st place, gold medalist(s)	1st place, gold medalist(s)		1st place, gold medalist(s)	
1978	Coca-Cola International		1st place, gold medalist(s)				
1978	FRG-ROM Dual Meet	1st place, gold medalist(s)	2nd place, silver medalist(s)				
1978	Romanian Championships		2nd place, silver medalist(s)	2nd place, silver medalist(s)			3rd place, bronze medalist(s)
1978	ROM-GBR Dual Meet	1st place, gold medalist(s)	2nd place, silver medalist(s)				
1978	World Championships	2nd place, silver medalist(s)					
1979	Coupe de Geneve		6				
1979	Hungarian International		2nd place, silver medalist(s)				
1979	Romanian Championships		1st place, gold medalist(s)				
1979	Summer Universiade		1st place, gold medalist(s)	3rd place, bronze medalist(s)	2nd place, silver medalist(s)	1st place, gold medalist(s)	2nd place, silver medalist(s)
