= Paula Ioan =

Romanian artistic gymnast

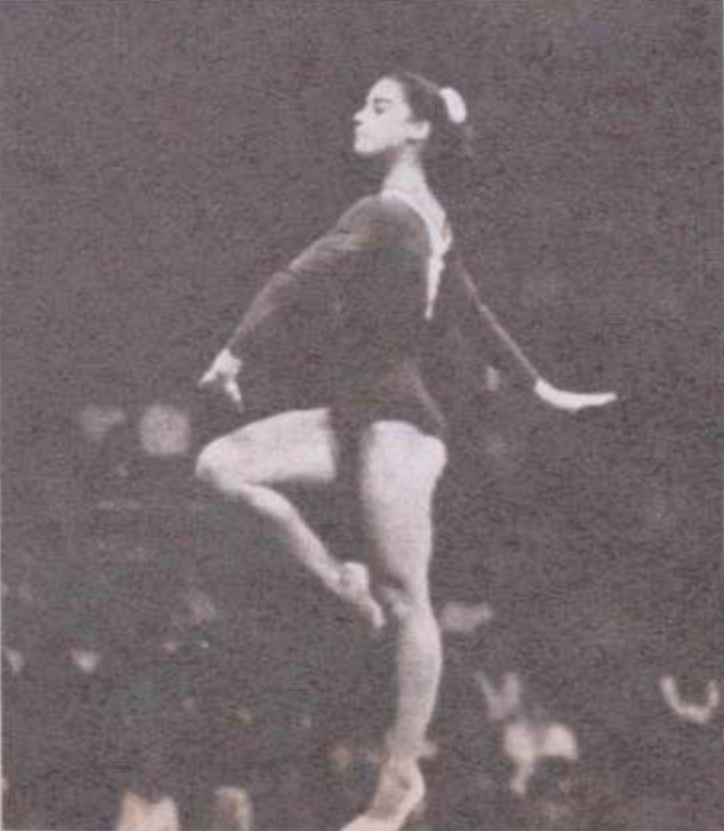
- Paula Ioan at the 1970 World Artistic Gymnastics Championships

Personal information
- Nationality: Romanian
- Born: April 1, 1955 (age 70)

Sport
- Sport: Artistic_gymnastics

Paula Ioan (born 1 April 1955 in Bucharest) is a Romanian former artistic gymnast. She competed at the 1970 World Artistic Gymnastics Championships as well as the 1972 Summer Olympics, where she tied for 46th in the Women's individual all-around.
