= Octavian Bellu =

Head of Romanian national artistic gymnastics team

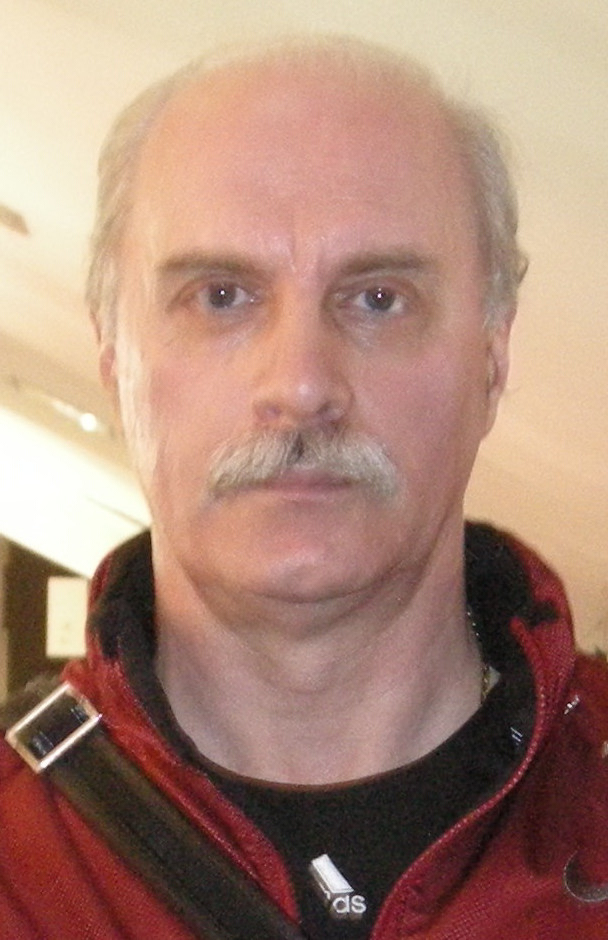
- Octavian Bellu in 2011
- Born: Octavian Ioan Atanase Bellu; 17 February 1951 (age 75); Ploiești, Romania

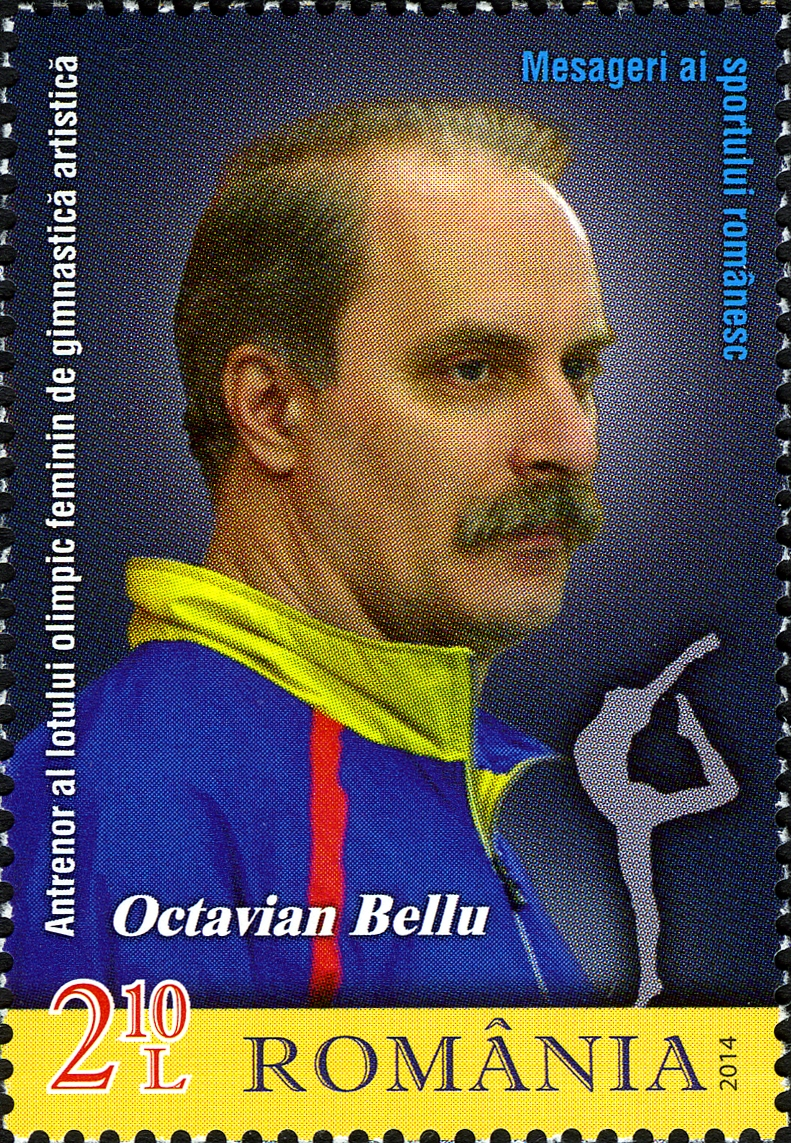
Octavian Bellu on a 2014 Romanian stamp

Octavian Ioan Atanase Bellu (Romanian pronunciation: [oktaviˈan ˈbelu]; born 17 February 1951) is the current head of the Romanian national women's artistic gymnastics team.

He was the main coach, with interruptions, from 1990 to 2005 and returned as head of the national team in 2010.

Highly successful, Bellu led the team to five world and two Olympic titles, as well as coaching numerous individual gold medalists – since 1990, Romania has been the most successful women's gymnastics power. He also coached such accomplished gymnasts as Lavinia Miloșovici, Andreea Răducan, Monica Roșu, Simona Amânar, Gina Gogean, Cătălina Ponor, Sandra Izbașa and Larisa Iordache. During his time as head coach, his teams have combined to win 82 world (59) and Olympic (23) medals.

In 2007, the World Record Academy recognized Bellu as the world's most successful coach, with 16 Olympic gold medals and a total of 279 medals at the European and World Championships and Olympic Games. He was inducted into the International Gymnastics Hall of Fame in May 2009.

== Early life and career ==
Bellu started out in gymnastics as a gymnast at Petrolul Ploiești Sport Club and dedicated 13 years to the sport. Admittedly, he was an average gymnast and had trouble because of his height. He also played volleyball and basketball and took up diving. In 1974, he graduated from the Faculty of Physical Education and Sports Institute in Bucharest, where he studied the technical aspects of the sport, methodology and training. After graduation, he worked for five years as a teacher of physical education at Valea Călugărească. At the same time, he worked as a part-time coach for young girls at the club where he was previously enrolled as a gymnast. In 1978–1979, he gave up his teaching position to become a full-time coach at Petrolul Ploiești and then at a club in Bacău.

== National team 1981–2005 ==
Bellu became a coach of the national team in 1981 after the defection of Márta and Bela Károlyi to the United States. In 1990, Bellu took over as women's head coach, succeeding Adrian Goreac. While he served as national coach in Deva from 1990 to 2005, the national team won five consecutive world titles, from 1994 to 2001, and two Olympic team gold medals, in 2000 and 2004. Bellu's gymnasts were dominant in the 2004 Olympic Games, winning four of the six available gold medals. During his time as head coach, his teams combined to win 82 world (59) and Olympic (23) medals.

== Resignation and political career ==
In early 2005, Bellu and his coaching partner Mariana Bitang resigned their positions with the national team because of a media scandal. In 2006, they were hired as advisors on the staff of Romanian President Traian Băsescu. Bellu was also the president of the National Sports Committee and a state secretary in the Ministry of Sports.

== Comeback ==
In 2010, the Romanian federation invited Bellu and Bitang to help prepare the national team for the 2012 Olympic Games. Bellu was reinstated as head of the national team, replacing Nicolae Forminte. Bellu reached the 300-medal mark in European, World and Olympic Games after the 2013 European Artistic Gymnastics Championships in Moscow.

== Personal life ==
Bellu has one daughter, Iolanda, born in 1978, with his first wife, Camelia, a nurse. In 2008–2009, he married Mariana Bitang, his coaching partner.
