= Gymnastics at the 1980 Summer Olympics – Women's artistic team all-around =

Women's artistic team all-around at the Games of the XXII Olympiad
- Venue: Palace of Sports
- Date: 21–23 July 1980
- Competitors: 48 from 10 nations
- Winning total: 394.90 points

Medalists
1st place, gold medalist(s)		Elena Davydova, Maria Filatova, Nellie Kim, Yelena Naimushina, Natalia Shaposhnikova, Stella Zakharova	Soviet Union
2nd place, silver medalist(s)		Nadia Comăneci, Rodica Dunca, Emilia Eberle, Cristina Elena Grigoraș, Melita Ruhn, Dumitrița Turner	Romania
3rd place, bronze medalist(s)		Maxi Gnauck, Silvia Hindorff, Steffi Kräker, Katharina Rensch, Karola Sube, Birgit Süß	East Germany

These are the results of the women's team all-around competition, one of six events for female competitors in artistic gymnastics at the 1980 Summer Olympics in Moscow. The compulsory and optional rounds took place on July 21 and 23 at the Sports Palace of the Central Lenin Stadium.

== Results ==
The final score for each team was determined by combining all of the scores earned by the team on each apparatus during the compulsory and optional rounds. If all six gymnasts on a team performed a routine on a single apparatus during compulsories or optionals, only the five highest scores on that apparatus counted toward the team total.

Rank	Team	Vault			Uneven Bars			Balance Beam			Floor			Total	Rank
Rank	Team	C	O	Rank	C	O	Rank	C	O	Rank	C	O	Rank	Total	Rank
Gold medal	Soviet Union	98.600		2	98.650		1	98.600		1	99.050		1	394.900	
Gold medal	Natalia Shaposhnikova	10.000	9.800	4	9.950	9.800	3	9.950	9.800	3	9.950	9.900	1	79.150	2
Gold medal	Elena Davydova	9.900	9.900	4	9.800	9.900	9	9.900	9.800	4	9.800	10.000	5	79.000	5
Gold medal	Nellie Kim	9.900	9.750	12	9.900	9.850	3	9.900	9.800	4	9.900	9.950	1	78.950	6
Gold medal	Maria Filatova	9.900	9.800	9	9.850	9.900	3	9.900	9.700	10	9.800	9.950	8	78.800	7
Gold medal	Stella Zakharova	9.900	9.750	12	9.900	9.800	9	9.800	9.900	4	9.800	9.900	10	78.750	8
Gold medal	Yelena Naimushina	9.850	9.600	22	9.750	9.750	17	9.800	9.850	9	9.850	9.950	5	78.400	12
Silver medal	Romania	98.700		1	98.300		3	98.300		2	98.200		2	393.500	
Silver medal	Emilia Eberle	9.850	9.750	15	9.900	10.000	2	9.900	9.900	2	9.900	9.900	5	79.100	3
Silver medal	Nadia Comăneci	9.950	9.900	2	9.950	9.500	20	10.000	9.900	1	9.950	9.900	1	79.050	4
Silver medal	Rodica Dunca	9.900	9.800	9	9.750	9.750	17	9.900	9.800	4	9.800	9.800	13	78.500	10
Silver medal	Melita Ruhn	9.750	10.000	6	9.850	9.900	3	9.800	9.600	17	9.700	9.700	19	78.300	13
Silver medal	Cristina Grigoraș	9.700	9.950	12	9.600	9.800	22	9.700	9.750	15	9.700	9.800	15	78.000	15
Silver medal	Dumitrița Turner	9.850	9.750	15	9.150	9.800	32	9.700	9.650	21	9.600	9.750	22	77.250	22
Bronze medal	East Germany	98.600		2	98.550		2	97.350		3	98.050		3	392.550	
Bronze medal	Maxi Gnauck	9.950	9.900	1	9.950	10.000	1	9.900	9.800	4	9.900	9.950	1	79.350	1
Bronze medal	Katharina Rensch	9.800	9.950	6	9.900	9.800	9	9.650	9.750	17	9.800	9.900	10	78.550	9
Bronze medal	Steffi Kräker	9.950	9.900	2	9.850	9.900	3	9.800	9.750	12	9.700	9.650	22	78.500	10
Bronze medal	Birgit Süß	9.900	9.850	6	9.800	9.800	14	9.800	9.100	29	9.800	9.850	12	77.900	17
Bronze medal	Silvia Hindorff	9.900	9.500	23	9.850	9.450	25	9.750	9.400	23	9.800	9.700	15	77.350	21
Bronze medal	Karola Sube	9.800	9.250	31	9.750	9.700	20	9.700	9.700	17	9.650	9.650	24	77.200	23
4	Czechoslovakia	96.700		6	97.550		4	97.250		4	97.300		4	388.800	
4	Eva Marečková	9.900	9.800	9	9.850	9.850	9	9.750	9.650	17	9.750	9.500	26	78.050	14
4	Radka Zemanová	9.800	9.600	23	9.900	9.650	16	9.800	9.800	10	9.700	9.750	18	78.000	15
4	Jana Labáková	9.850	9.800	12	9.450	9.700	27	9.650	9.650	22	9.850	9.900	8	77.850	18
4	Katarína Šarišská	9.700	9.350	31	9.800	9.800	14	9.800	9.700	14	9.600	9.800	19	77.550	19
4	Dana Brýdlová	9.700	9.200	35	9.700	9.700	22	9.700	9.750	15	9.700	9.600	24	77.050	26
4	Anita Šauerová	9.700	9.100	38	9.600	9.550	27	9.550	9.350	29	9.550	9.650	28	76.050	33
5	Hungary	96.800		5	97.350		5	94.200		6	95.950		5	384.300	
5	Erika Csányi	9.800	9.600	23	9.850	9.850	9	9.550	9.250	31	9.800	9.800	13	77.500	20
5	Erika Flander	9.800	9.800	15	9.450	9.550	30	9.550	9.550	24	9.700	9.800	15	77.200	23
5	Márta Egervári	9.800	9.800	15	9.800	9.950	3	9.450	8.950	41	9.550	9.200	38	76.500	27
5	Lenke Almási	9.700	9.300	34	9.650	9.650	25	9.550	9.200	33	9.550	9.650	28	76.250	29
5	Éva Óvári	9.700	9.200	35	9.750	9.750	17	9.750	9.250	25	9.700	9.150	35	76.250	29
5	Erzsébet Hanti	9.600	9.500	30	9.550	9.450	30	9.450	9.100	35	9.500	9.200	40	75.350	36
6	Bulgaria	97.000		4	95.000		6	94.900		5	95.200		6	382.100	
6	Silvia Topalova	9.800	9.700	21	9.800	9.550	24	9.800	9.750	12	9.550	9.250	36	77.200	23
6	Galina Marinova	9.800	9.600	23	9.650	9.100	35	9.750	9.200	27	9.600	9.800	19	76.500	27
6	Krasimira Toneva	9.750	9.850	15	9.700	9.450	27	9.750	8.500	43	9.550	9.700	26	76.250	29
6	Kamelia Eftimova	9.800	9.450	27	9.550	9.400	32	9.550	8.900	38	9.500	9.450	32	75.600	34
6	Dimitrinka Filipova	9.650	9.600	27	9.500	9.150	37	9.500	9.300	31	9.550	9.250	36	75.500	35
6	Antoaneta Rakhneva	9.600	9.150	40	9.400	9.250	37	9.000	9.400	41	9.400	9.150	42	74.350	40
7	Poland	94.350		7	93.950		7	93.050		7	94.900		7	376.250	
7	Łucja Matraszek	9.750	9.300	31	9.600	9.150	35	9.800	9.150	27	9.700	9.300	31	76.150	32
7	Małgorzata Majza	9.700	9.000	41	9.500	9.400	34	9.450	9.000	38	9.550	9.600	30	75.200	37
7	Anita Jokiel	9.600	9.200	38	9.050	9.600	37	9.700	8.750	38	9.600	9.350	32	74.950	38
7	Wiesława Żelaskowska	9.700	8.800	43	9.350	8.750	48	9.500	9.250	33	9.550	9.400	32	74.300	41
7	Agata Jaroszek	9.500	9.400	35	9.400	9.200	40	8.800	8.950	53	9.500	8.900	43	73.650	42
7	Katarzyna Snopko	9.600	9.100	41	9.450	8.900	42	9.500	8.150	55	9.500	9.250	38	73.450	44
8	North Korea	92.450		8	90.150		8	90.850		8	90.600		8	364.050	
8	Choe Jong-sil	9.700	9.500	29	9.250	9.100	42	9.500	9.500	25	9.500	8.800	44	74.850	39
8	Sin Myong-ok	9.150	9.200	45	9.100	8.650	55	9.000	9.150	45	9.100	9.150	45	72.500	46
8	Kang Myong-suk	9.200	9.300	43	9.000	8.700	57	9.050	9.300	44	9.300	8.500	50	72.350	47
8	Kim Chun-son	9.000	9.050	51	8.800	9.000	54	8.900	8.600	57	9.300	8.750	46	71.400	51
8	Choi Myong-hui	8.800	9.400	47	9.300	8.100	60	9.250	8.550	51	9.250	8.550	50	71.200	53
8	Lo Ok-sil	8.950	8.400	60	8.700	9.250	52	8.950	8.450	58	8.900	8.900	50	70.500	58
	Irene Martínez (ESP)	9.000	9.300	46	9.200	9.150	42	9.200	8.850	48	9.250	9.450	40	73.500	43
	Denise Jones (GBR)	9.250	8.900	49	9.100	9.150	45	9.350	9.200	35	9.000	8.900	47	72.850	45
	Suzanne Dando (GBR)	9.100	8.900	52	8.950	9.100	49	9.400	8.700	46	9.100	8.800	47	72.050	48
	Aurora Morata (ESP)	9.000	8.900	53	9.450	9.000	41	9.100	9.000	46	8.950	8.550	56	71.950	49
	Marina Sulicich (AUS)	9.000	8.750	55	8.950	9.300	45	9.100	8.650	53	8.950	8.900	49	71.600	50
	Estela de la Torre (MEX)	9.100	8.350	57	9.050	9.150	47	9.050	8.850	50	8.800	8.900	53	71.250	52
	Susan Cheesebrough (GBR)	9.100	8.350	57	9.300	8.600	51	9.500	9.000	37	8.950	8.350	58	71.150	54
	Davaasürengiin Oyuuntuyaa (MGL)	8.900	8.900	54	9.000	8.750	55	9.100	8.900	49	8.600	8.650	59	70.800	55
	Kerry Bayliss (AUS)	8.900	8.500	59	8.950	9.100	49	9.250	8.300	56	8.950	8.700	54	70.550	56
	Cláudia Costa (BRA)	9.250	8.950	47	8.900	8.700	59	8.800	8.450	60	8.750	8.750	56	70.550	56
	Lena Adomat (SWE)	9.300	8.800	50	9.250	8.700	52	9.200	8.150	59	8.700	8.300	60	70.400	59
	Dashzevgiin Ariunaa (MGL)	8.500	8.450	61	8.900	8.750	58	9.000	8.250	60	8.800	8.750	55	69.400	60
	Maria Avelina Álvarez (POR)	8.850	8.650	56	8.850	8.050	61	8.900	8.900	51	8.750	8.050	61	69.000	61
	Gloria Viseras (ESP)	9.400	0.000	62	9.400	0.000	62	9.150	0.000	62	9.200	0.000	62	37.150	62
