= 1979 World Artistic Gymnastics Championships =

Gymnastics competition

- Location: (United States) Fort Worth, USA

The 20th Artistic Gymnastics World Championships were held in Fort Worth, United States, in 1979. In November 1977 the 55th FIG Congress, held in Rome, changed the cycle of world championships: since 1979 they were to be held each two years, and the pre-Olympic ones were to be qualifications for the Olympic tournament. The first 12 teams in the team competition of the 1979 World Championships were invited to participate in the 1980 Summer Olympics.

These were the first World Championships in artistic gymnastics to be held outside of Europe, and the first that China competed at since 1962 following a 1978 vote in which the International Gymnastics Federation voted to accept the People's Republic of China as a member.

== Results ==
Event	Gold	Silver	Bronze
Men
Team all-around	Soviet Union; Alexander Dityatin; Aleksandr Tkachyov; Vladimir Markelov; Nikolai Andrianov; Bogdan Makuts; Artur Akopyan	Japan; Hiroshi Kajiyama; Shigeru Kasamatsu; Nobuyuki Kajitani; Toshiomi Nishikii; Koji Gushiken; Eizo Kenmotsu	United States; Kurt Thomas; Bart Conner; Jim Hartung; Larry Gerard; Tim LaFleur; Peter Vidmar
Individual all-around	(Soviet Union) Alexander Dityatin	(United States) Kurt Thomas	(Soviet Union) Aleksandr Tkachyov
Floor	(East Germany) Roland Brückner (United States) Kurt Thomas	none awarded	(Soviet Union) Aleksandr Tkachyov
Pommel horse	(Hungary) Zoltán Magyar	(United States) Kurt Thomas	(Japan) Koji Gushiken
Rings	(Soviet Union) Alexander Dityatin	(Romania) Danuţ Grecu	(Soviet Union) Aleksandr Tkachyov
Vault	(Soviet Union) Alexander Dityatin	(Soviet Union) Nikolai Andrianov	(East Germany) Ralph Bärthel (United States) Bart Conner
Parallel bars	(United States) Bart Conner	(Soviet Union) Aleksandr Tkachyov (United States) Kurt Thomas	none awarded
Horizontal bar	(United States) Kurt Thomas	(Soviet Union) Aleksandr Tkachyov	(Soviet Union) Alexander Dityatin
Women
Team all-around	Romania; Nadia Comăneci; Rodica Dunca; Emilia Eberle; Melita Ruhn; Dumitriţa Turner; Marilena Vladarau	Soviet Union; Maria Filatova; Nellie Kim; Elena Naimushina; Natalia Shaposhnikova; Natalia Tereschenko; Stella Zakharova	East Germany; Maxi Gnauck; Regina Grabolle; Silvia Hindorff; Steffi Kräker; Katharina Rensch; Karola Sube
Individual all-around	(Soviet Union) Nellie Kim	(East Germany) Maxi Gnauck	(Romania) Melita Ruhn
Vault	(Romania) Dumitriţa Turner	(Soviet Union) Stella Zakharova	(Soviet Union) Nellie Kim (East Germany) Steffi Kräker
Uneven bars	(China) Ma Yanhong (East Germany) Maxi Gnauck	none awarded	(Romania) Emilia Eberle
Balance beam	(Czechoslovakia) Věra Černá	(Soviet Union) Nellie Kim	(East Germany) Regina Grabolle
Floor	(Romania) Emilia Eberle	(Soviet Union) Nellie Kim	(Romania) Melita Ruhn

== Men ==
=== Team final ===
The Soviet Union's first-place finish made them the first team since 1960 to beat Japan at an Olympics or World Championships. The United States' bronze medal was their first team medal and best result yet.

Rank	Team	Floor		Pommel horse		Rings		Vault		Parallel bars		Horizontal bar		Total
Rank	Team	C	O	C	O	C	O	C	O	C	O	C	O	Total
Gold medal	Soviet Union	98.200		97.150		97.650		98.650		97.600		98.250		587.500
Gold medal	Alexander Dityatin	9.800	9.850	9.750	9.750	9.900	9.900	9.900	9.900	9.750	9.850	9.800	9.950	118.100
Gold medal	Aleksandr Tkachyov	9.850	9.900	9.700	9.750	9.750	9.800	9.800	9.800	9.750	9.850	9.800	9.900	117.650
Gold medal	Vladimir Markelov	9.750	9.750	9.650	9.750	9.700	9.800	9.800	9.850	9.700	9.800	9.800	9.800	117.150
Gold medal	Nikolai Andrianov	9.850	9.900	9.750	9.750	9.700	9.650	9.950	9.850	9.700	9.850	9.100	9.750	116.800
Gold medal	Bogdan Makuts	9.750	9.750	9.550	9.600	9.600	9.600	9.900	9.850	9.500	9.850	9.750	9.850	116.550
Gold medal	Artur Akopyan	9.600	9.800	9.600	9.700	9.750	9.700	9.600	9.850	9.300	9.700	9.850	9.700	116.100
Silver medal	Japan	97.700		96.900		96.600		97.400		97.150		97.950		583.700
Silver medal	Hiroshi Kajiyama	9.750	9.800	9.650	9.600	9.600	9.800	9.550	9.900	9.700	9.800	9.850	9.600	116.600
Silver medal	Eizo Kenmotsu	9.600	9.850	9.650	9.700	9.500	9.600	9.750	9.750	9.550	9.700	9.850	9.900	116.400
Silver medal	Koji Gushiken	9.750	9.750	9.800	9.800	9.800	9.800	9.650	9.800	9.700	9.800	9.000	9.700	116.350
Silver medal	Toshiomi Nishikii	9.700	9.700	9.600	9.500	9.550	9.750	9.650	9.700	9.500	9.800	9.800	9.750	116.000
Silver medal	Nobuyuki Kajitani	9.400	9.850	9.600	9.600	9.600	9.600	9.600	9.800	9.600	9.700	9.750	9.800	115.900
Silver medal	Shigeru Kasamatsu	9.750	9.900	9.700	9.800	8.700	9.600	9.600	9.900	9.800	9.450	9.750	9.800	115.750
Bronze medal	United States	97.850		96.300		96.350		97.400		96.300		96.950		581.150
Bronze medal	Kurt Thomas	9.900	9.900	9.800	9.850	9.650	9.800	9.700	9.800	9.800	9.800	9.850	9.900	117.750
Bronze medal	Bart Conner	9.850	9.850	9.700	9.700	9.650	9.600	9.900	9.850	9.750	9.900	9.900	9.300	116.950
Bronze medal	Jim Hartung	9.800	9.700	9.600	9.700	9.600	9.800	9.800	9.800	9.550	9.300	9.800	9.750	116.200
Bronze medal	Larry Gerard	9.550	9.800	9.350	9.550	9.100	9.650	9.600	9.750	9.400	9.550	9.650	9.600	114.550
Bronze medal	Tim LaFleur	9.450	9.800	9.500	9.600	9.550	9.600	9.450	9.600	9.250	9.600	9.550	9.400	114.300
Bronze medal	Peter Vidmar	9.700	9.500	9.350	9.550	9.450	9.250	9.600	9.600	9.400	9.550	9.050	9.550	113.550
4	East Germany	97.850		96.450		96.400		97.750		96.050		96.500		581.000
4	Roland Brückner	9.650	9.900	9.850	9.700	9.600	9.700	9.600	9.900	9.650	9.700	9.800	9.700	117.000
4	Michael Nikolay	9.650	9.750	9.850	9.900	9.600	9.600	9.600	9.850	9.650	9.800	9.800	9.800	116.850
4	Lutz Mack	9.750	9.750	9.300	9.550	9.800	9.750	9.760	9.750	9.550	9.550	9.600	9.300	115.400
4	Andreas Bronst	9.500	9.750	9.600	9.700	9.350	9.400	9.600	9.600	9.500	9.750	9.400	9.600	114.750
4	Lutz Hoffmann	9.800	9.400	9.600	9.650	9.450	9.500	9.700	9.750	9.400	9.150	9.700	9.600	114.700
4	Ralf Bärthel	9.800	9.800	8.650	9.500	9.600	9.700	9.800	9.850	9.400	9.500	9.500	9.450	114.550
5	China	98.300		95.400		96.850		96.300		95.250		96.850		578.950
5	Huang Yubin	9.850	9.800	9.600	9.650	9.750	9.750	9.500	9.800	9.650	9.600	9.800	9.650	116.400
5	Cai Huanzong	9.700	9.850	9.700	9.300	9.500	9.700	9.600	9.550	9.650	9.450	9.600	9.750	115.950
5	Li Yuejiu	9.850	9.900	9.450	9.550	9.350	9.500	9.700	9.750	9.600	9.500	9.600	9.800	115.550
5	Tong Fei	9.900	9.700	9.600	9.050	9.700	9.600	9.450	9.700	9.500	9.050	9.700	9.900	114.850
5	Peng Yaping	9.650	9.850	9.400	9.550	9.700	9.700	9.300	9.650	9.550	9.400	9.650	9.400	114.800
5	Xiong Songliang	9.900	9.400	8.950	9.600	9.700	9.750	9.600	9.400	9.400	9.350	9.600	9.200	113.850

=== All-around ===
Rank	Gymnast	Floor (gymnastics)	Pommel horse	Rings (gymnastics)	Vault (gymnastics)	Parallel bars	Horizontal bar	Score	Prelim score	Total
1st place, gold medalist(s)	Alexander Dityatin (URS)	9.900	9.850	9.900	9.850	9.800	9.900	59.200	59.050	118.250
2nd place, silver medalist(s)	Kurt Thomas (USA)	9.850	9.900	9.800	9.900	9.800	9.850	59.100	58.875	117.975
3rd place, bronze medalist(s)	Aleksandr Tkachyov (URS)	9.550	9.800	9.800	9.800	9.800	9.900	58.650	58.825	117.475
4	Vladimir Markelov (URS)	9.800	9.700	9.800	9.850	9.700	9.850	58.700	58.575	117.275
5	Bart Conner (USA)	9.700	9.750	9.650	9.850	9.800	9.800	58.550	58.475	117.025
6	Roland Brückner (GDR)	9.800	9.800	9.800	9.900	9.600	9.600	58.500	58.500	117.000
7	Koji Gushiken (JPN)	9.750	9.800	9.750	9.800	9.700	9.800	58.600	58.175	116.775
8	Stoyan Deltchev (BUL)	9.650	9.200	9.800	9.850	9.750	9.900	58.150	58.375	116.525
9	Jim Hartung (USA)	9.750	9.750	9.700	9.900	9.450	9.800	58.350	58.100	116.450
9	Hiroshi Kajiyama (JPN)	9.550	9.650	9.700	9.800	9.700	9.750	58.150	58.300	116.450
11	Huang Yubin (CHN)	9.550	9.800	9.600	9.800	9.750	9.700	58.200	58.200	116.400
12	Philippe Delasalle (CAN)	9.800	9.800	9.650	9.900	9.800	9.700	58.650	57.650	116.300
13	Li Yuejiu (CHN)	9.900	9.650	9.450	9.800	9.700	9.900	58.400	57.775	116.175
14	Michael Nikolay (GDR)	9.700	9.150	9.800	9.750	9.400	9.800	57.600	58.425	116.025
15	Tishomi Nishikii (JPN)	9.550	9.700	9.700	9.700	9.600	9.650	57.900	58.000	115.900
16	Péter Kovács (HUN)	9.750	9.550	9.750	9.750	9.600	9.800	58.200	57.475	115.675
17	Ferenc Donáth (HUN)	9.300	9.750	9.800	9.700	9.600	9.700	57.850	57.800	115.650
18	Zoltán Magyar (HUN)	9.550	9.950	9.400	9.700	9.600	9.600	57.800	57.700	115.500
19	Cai Huanzong (CHN)	9.500	9.500	9.700	9.700	9.700	9.600	57.700	57.675	115.375
20	Lutz Mack (GDR)	9.750	9.200	9.750	9.800	9.500	9.450	57.450	57.700	115.150
21	Eberhard Gienger (FRG)	9.600	9.600	9.650	9.600	9.750	9.550	57.750	57.025	114.775
22	Henri Boerio (FRA)	9.650	9.700	9.500	9.750	9.600	9.450	57.650	57.100	114.750
23	Dănuț Grecu (ROU)	9.250	9.650	9.800	9.750	9.450	9.550	57.450	57.200	114.650
24	Volker Rohrwick (FRG)	9.450	9.450	9.450	9.700	9.600	9.650	57.300	57.200	114.500
25	Jiří Tabák (TCH)	9.700	9.100	9.600	9.850	9.400	9.550	57.200	57.100	114.300
26	Kurt Szilier (ROU)	9.300	9.350	9.550	9.700	9.500	9.600	57.000	57.275	114.275
27	Plamen Petkov (BUL)	9.550	9.500	9.500	9.750	9.650	9.550	57.500	56.675	114.175
28	Andrzej Szajna (POL)	9.500	9.100	9.700	9.800	9.550	9.700	57.350	56.800	114.150
29	Benno Gross (FRG)	9.300	9.700	9.300	9.700	9.300	9.650	56.950	57.075	114.025
30	Aurel Georgescu (ROU)	9.700	9.200	9.450	9.800	9.450	9.450	57.050	56.600	113.650
31	Markus Lehmann (SUI)	9.300	9.300	9.400	9.750	9.500	9.450	56.700	56.225	112.925
31	Jozef Konecny (TCH)	9.350	8.800	9.450	9.800	9.350	9.600	56.350	56.575	112.925
33	Finn Gjertsen (NOR)	9.300	9.650	9.500	9.650	8.850	9.400	56.350	56.500	112.850
34	Lars Pettersen (NOR)	9.200	9.400	9.300	9.450	9.450	9.450	56.250	56.300	112.550
35	Fernando Bertrand (ESP)	9.350	9.300	9.500	9.650	8.300	9.700	55.800	56.225	112.025
36	Warren Long (CAN)	0.000	0.000	2.000	0.000	0.000	0.000	2.000	56.750	58.750

=== Floor exercise ===
Rank	Gymnast	Score	Prelim score	Total
1st place, gold medalist(s)	Kurt Thomas (USA)	9.900	9.900	19.800
1st place, gold medalist(s)	Roland Brückner (GDR)	9.900	9.900	19.800
3rd place, bronze medalist(s)	Aleksandr Tkachyov (URS)	9.900	9.875	19.775
4	Nikolai Andrianov (URS)	9.850	9.875	19.725
5	Bart Conner (USA)	9.850	9.850	19.700
6	Li Yuejiu (CHN)	9.850	9.875	19.575
6	Shigeru Kasamatsu (JPN)	9.700	9.825	19.575
8	Huang Yubin (CHN)	9.350	9.825	19.175

=== Pommel horse ===
Rank	Gymnast	Score	Prelim score	Total
1st place, gold medalist(s)	Zoltán Magyar (HUN)	9.950	9.875	19.825
2nd place, silver medalist(s)	Kurt Thomas (USA)	9.900	9.825	19.725
3rd place, bronze medalist(s)	Koji Gushiken (JPN)	9.800	9.800	19.600
4	Alexander Dityatin (URS)	9.800	9.750	19.550
5	Stoyan Deltchev (BUL)	9.800	9.725	19.525
6	Shigeru Kasamatsu (JPN)	9.700	9.750	19.450
7	Nikolai Andrianov (URS)	9.000	9.750	18.750
8	Michael Nikolay (GDR)	8.800	9.875	18.675

=== Rings ===
Rank	Gymnast	Score	Prelim score	Total
1st place, gold medalist(s)	Alexander Dityatin (URS)	9.900	9.900	19.800
2nd place, silver medalist(s)	Dănuț Grecu (ROU)	9.900	9.800	19.700
3rd place, bronze medalist(s)	Aleksandr Tkachyov (URS)	9.900	9.775	19.675
4	Koji Gushiken (JPN)	9.850	9.800	19.650
5	Stoyan Deltchev (BUL)	9.800	9.825	19.625
6	Huang Yubin (CHN)	9.800	9.750	19.550
7	Lutz Mack (GDR)	9.750	9.775	19.525
8	Ferenc Donáth (HUN)	9.500	9.775	19.175

=== Vault ===
Rank	Gymnast	Score	Prelim score	Total
1st place, gold medalist(s)	Alexander Dityatin (URS)	9.825	9.900	19.725
2nd place, silver medalist(s)	Nikolai Andrianov (URS)	9.800	9.900	19.700
3rd place, bronze medalist(s)	Bart Conner (USA)	9.800	9.875	19.675
3rd place, bronze medalist(s)	Ralph Bärthel (GDR)	9.850	9.825	19.675
5	Roland Brückner (GDR)	9.750	9.850	19.600
6	Jiří Tabák (TCH)	9.775	9.750	19.525
7	Shigeru Kasamatsu (JPN)	9.700	9.750	19.450
8	James Hartung (USA)	9.575	9.800	19.375

=== Parallel bars ===
Rank	Gymnast	Score	Prelim score	Total
1st place, gold medalist(s)	Bart Conner (USA)	9.900	9.825	19.725
2nd place, silver medalist(s)	Kurt Thomas (USA)	9.900	9.800	19.700
2nd place, silver medalist(s)	Aleksandr Tkachyov (URS)	9.900	9.800	19.700
4	Koji Gushiken (JPN)	9.850	9.750	19.600
4	Alexander Dityatin (URS)	9.800	9.800	19.600
6	Hiroshi Kajiyama (JPN)	9.700	9.750	19.450
7	Roland Brückner (GDR)	9.750	9.675	19.425
8	Michael Nikolay (GDR)	9.600	9.725	19.325

=== Horizontal bar ===
Rank	Gymnast	Score	Prelim score	Total
1st place, gold medalist(s)	Kurt Thomas (USA)	9.900	9.875	19.775
2nd place, silver medalist(s)	Aleksandr Tkachyov (URS)	9.900	9.850	19.750
3rd place, bronze medalist(s)	Alexander Dityatin (URS)	9.800	9.875	19.675
4	Stoyan Deltchev (BUL)	9.700	9.850	19.550
5	Tong Fei (CHN)	9.700	9.800	19.500
5	Michael Nikolay (GDR)	9.700	9.800	19.500
7	Nobuyuki Kajitani (JPN)	9.700	9.775	19.475
8	Péter Kovács (HUN)	9.150	9.800	18.950

== Women ==
=== Team final ===
Rank	Team	Vault (gymnastics)		Uneven bars		Balance beam		Floor (gymnastics)		Total
Rank	Team	C	O	C	O	C	O	C	O	Total
1st place, gold medalist(s)	Romania	97.650		97.200		96.800		97.900		389.550
1st place, gold medalist(s)	Melita Ruhn	9.800	9.900	9.750	9.800	9.550	9.800	9.750	9.900	78.250
1st place, gold medalist(s)	Rodica Dunca	9.600	9.750	9.650	9.600	9.500	9.750	9.700	9.800	77.350
1st place, gold medalist(s)	Emilia Eberle	9.600	9.750	9.850	9.850	9.650	8.950	9.850	9.850	77.350
1st place, gold medalist(s)	Dumitrița Turner	9.800	9.900	9.550	9.700	9.400	9.700	9.550	9.700	77.300
1st place, gold medalist(s)	Marilena Vlădărău	9.550	9.700	9.450	9.500	9.450	9.550	9.700	9.850	76.750
1st place, gold medalist(s)	Nadia Comăneci	9.850	0.000	9.950	0.000	9.900	9.950	9.800	0.000	49.450
2nd place, silver medalist(s)	Soviet Union	97.775		95.950		97.300		97.900		388.925
2nd place, silver medalist(s)	Nellie Kim	9.750	9.900	9.850	9.800	9.800	9.750	9.900	9.750	78.500
2nd place, silver medalist(s)	Maria Filatova	9.650	9.800	9.800	9.800	9.800	9.750	9.750	9.950	78.300
2nd place, silver medalist(s)	Natalia Shaposhnikova	9.700	9.800	9.800	9.100	9.900	9.500	9.800	9.800	77.400
2nd place, silver medalist(s)	Stella Zakharova	9.800	9.850	9.700	9.000	9.700	9.750	9.600	9.850	77.250
2nd place, silver medalist(s)	Elena Naimushina	9.650	9.700	9.600	9.550	9.650	9.700	9.650	9.800	77.250
2nd place, silver medalist(s)	Natalia Tereschenko	9.725	9.800	9.550	9.000	9.400	9.350	9.550	9.800	76.175
3rd place, bronze medalist(s)	East Germany	97.250		97.650		96.650		96.525		388.075
3rd place, bronze medalist(s)	Maxi Gnauck	9.750	9.800	9.950	9.900	9.700	9.650	9.700	9.900	78.350
3rd place, bronze medalist(s)	Steffi Kräker	9.750	9.900	9.900	9.800	9.700	9.600	9.400	9.650	77.700
3rd place, bronze medalist(s)	Regina Grabolle	9.600	9.600	9.850	9.600	9.800	9.750	9.450	9.800	77.450
3rd place, bronze medalist(s)	Silvia Hindorff	9.650	9.800	9.650	9.500	9.600	9.600	9.575	9.700	77.075
3rd place, bronze medalist(s)	Karola Sube	9.550	9.550	9.700	9.450	9.650	9.600	9.400	9.650	76.550
3rd place, bronze medalist(s)	Katharina Rensch	9.600	9.800	9.850	9.600	9.400	9.050	9.700	9.200	76.200
4	China	95.450		97.300		95.350		96.500		384.600
4	Zhu Zheng	9.450	9.800	9.850	9.800	9.500	9.700	9.650	9.550	77.300
4	Zheng Sihua	9.350	9.850	9.800	9.550	9.400	9.650	9.750	9.700	77.050
4	Liu Yajun	9.350	9.700	9.700	9.500	9.250	9.800	9.600	9.700	76.600
4	Ma Yanhong	9.200	9.550	9.950	9.900	9.200	9.500	9.550	9.600	76.450
4	He Xiumin	9.350	9.500	9.850	9.250	9.500	9.450	9.600	9.650	76.150
4	Li Cuiling	9.450	9.600	9.650	9.400	9.350	9.700	9.700	8.950	75.800
5	Czechoslovakia	96.050		95.100		97.050		94.100		382.300
5	Věra Černá	9.750	9.500	9.750	9.150	9.900	9.900	9.650	9.700	77.300
5	Eva Marečková	9.700	9.600	9.700	9.600	9.750	9.750	9.700	9.200	77.000
5	Radka Zemanová	9.700	9.550	9.400	9.550	9.700	9.750	9.400	9.000	76.050
5	Katarína Šarišská	9.700	9.500	9.500	9.500	9.600	9.650	9.400	9.050	75.900
5	Anita Sauerová	9.550	9.500	9.500	9.400	9.350	9.500	9.450	9.400	75.650
5	Lenka Chatarová	9.400	9.350	9.250	9.200	9.450	9.600	9.450	9.100	74.800

=== All-around ===
Rank	Gymnast	Vault (gymnastics)	Uneven bars	Balance beam	Floor (gymnastics)	Score	Prelim score	Total
1st place, gold medalist(s)	Nellie Kim (URS)	9.850	9.850	9.850	9.850	39.400	39.250	78.650
2nd place, silver medalist(s)	Maxi Gnauck (GDR)	9.700	9.900	9.700	9.900	39.200	39.175	78.375
3rd place, bronze medalist(s)	Melita Ruhn (ROU)	9.800	9.800	9.800	9.800	39.200	39.125	78.325
4	Maria Filatova (URS)	9.800	9.400	9.800	9.800	38.800	39.150	77.950
5	Rodica Dunca (ROU)	9.500	9.750	9.900	9.900	39.050	38.675	77.725
6	Věra Černá (TCH)	9.600	9.800	9.700	9.850	38.950	38.650	77.600
7	Steffi Kräker (GDR)	9.800	9.750	9.650	9.350	38.550	38.850	77.400
8	Emilia Eberle (ROU)	9.700	9.900	9.200	9.900	38.700	38.675	77.375
9	Regina Grabolle (GDR)	9.500	9.550	9.800	9.700	38.550	38.725	77.275
10	Eva Marečková (TCH)	9.650	9.600	9.750	9.700	38.700	38.500	77.200
11	Zhu Zheng (CHN)	9.650	9.600	9.700	9.300	38.250	38.650	76.900
12	Leslie Pyfer (USA)	9.750	9.600	9.650	9.650	38.650	38.175	76.825
13	Elena Naimushina (URS)	9.700	9.600	9.350	9.450	38.100	38.625	76.725
14	Radka Zemanová (TCH)	9.550	9.600	9.650	9.700	38.500	38.025	76.525
15	Zheng Sihua (CHN)	9.650	9.200	9.200	9.700	37.750	38.525	76.275
15	Erika Flander (HUN)	9.750	9.550	9.500	9.550	38.350	37.925	76.275
17	Krasimira Toneva (BUL)	9.700	9.350	9.550	9.650	38.250	37.825	76.075
18	Erzsébet Hanti (HUN)	9.550	9.500	9.400	9.600	38.050	37.975	76.025
19	Suzy Kellems (USA)	9.600	9.000	9.450	9.700	37.750	38.225	75.975
20	Elfi Schlegel (CAN)	9.600	9.500	9.000	9.700	37.800	38.075	75.875
20	Silvia Topalova (BUL)	9.500	9.700	9.000	9.600	37.800	38.075	75.875
22	Éva Óvári (HUN)	9.600	9.450	8.950	9.600	37.600	38.175	75.775
23	Marcia Frederick (USA)	9.850	8.700	9.600	9.700	37.850	37.900	75.750
24	Liu Yajun (CHN)	8.950	9.200	9.500	9.600	37.250	38.300	75.550
24	Sakiko Nozawa (JPN)	9.350	9.600	9.350	9.600	37.900	37.650	75.550
26	Yayoi Kano (JPN)	9.450	9.450	9.500	9.250	37.650	37.850	75.500
27	Annette Michler (FRG)	9.500	9.450	9.450	9.500	37.900	37.500	75.400
28	Romi Kessler (SUI)	9.600	9.500	9.100	9.600	37.800	37.525	75.325
29	Ellen Stewart (CAN)	9.450	9.500	9.400	9.400	37.750	37.475	75.225
30	Łucja Matraszek (POL)	9.350	9.450	8.950	9.400	37.150	37.675	74.825
31	Diana Carnegie (CAN)	9.550	9.150	9.450	9.400	37.550	37.250	74.800
31	Lee Hyang Rim (KOR)	9.400	9.450	9.000	9.550	37.400	37.400	74.800
33	Galina Marinova (BUL)	9.500	8.700	9.550	9.550	37.300	37.450	74.750
34	Claudia Rossier (SUI)	9.350	9.450	8.900	9.600	37.300	37.225	74.525
35	Rika Anami (JPN)	9.500	9.000	8.900	9.600	37.000	37.425	74.425
36	Martine Pidoux (FRA)	9.550	8.550	9.300	9.200	36.600	37.250	73.850

=== Vault ===
Rank	Gymnast	Score	Prelim score	Total
1st place, gold medalist(s)	Dumitrița Turner (ROU)	9.925	9.850	19.775
2nd place, silver medalist(s)	Stella Zakharova (URS)	9.875	9.825	19.700
3rd place, bronze medalist(s)	Nellie Kim (URS)	9.850	9.825	19.675
3rd place, bronze medalist(s)	Steffi Kräker (GDR)	9.850	9.825	19.675
5	Christa Canary (USA)	9.825	9.813	19.638
6	Maxi Gnauck (GDR)	9.800	9.775	19.575
7	Melita Ruhn (ROU)	9.625	9.850	19.475
8	Suzy Kellems (USA)	8.800	9.675	18.475

=== Uneven bars ===
Rank	Gymnast	Score	Prelim score	Total
1st place, gold medalist(s)	Maxi Gnauck (GDR)	9.900	9.925	19.825
1st place, gold medalist(s)	Ma Yanhong (CHN)	9.900	9.925	19.825
3rd place, bronze medalist(s)	Emilia Eberle (ROU)	9.900	9.850	19.750
4	Steffi Kräker (GDR)	9.850	9.850	19.700
5	Nellie Kim (URS)	9.800	9.825	19.625
6	Marcia Frederick (USA)	9.800	9.800	19.600
7	Maria Filatova (URS)	9.300	9.800	19.100
8	Zhu Zheng (CHN)	9.250	9.825	19.075

=== Balance beam ===
Rank	Gymnast	Score	Prelim score	Total
1st place, gold medalist(s)	Věra Černá (TCH)	9.900	9.900	19.800
2nd place, silver medalist(s)	Nellie Kim (URS)	9.850	9.775	19.625
3rd place, bronze medalist(s)	Regina Grabolle (GDR)	9.800	9.775	19.575
4	Eva Marečková (TCH)	9.800	9.750	19.550
5	Maria Filatova (URS)	9.750	9.775	19.525
6	Maxi Gnauck (GDR)	9.700	9.675	19.375
7	Krasimira Toneva (BUL)	9.650	9.675	19.325
8	Melita Ruhn (ROU)	9.300	9.675	18.975

=== Floor exercise ===
Rank	Gymnast	Score	Prelim score	Total
1st place, gold medalist(s)	Emilia Eberle (ROU)	9.950	9.850	19.800
2nd place, silver medalist(s)	Nellie Kim (URS)	9.950	9.825	19.775
3rd place, bronze medalist(s)	Melita Ruhn (ROU)	9.900	9.825	19.725
4	Maxi Gnauck (GDR)	9.900	9.800	19.700
5	Maria Filatova (URS)	9.800	9.850	19.650
6	Věra Černá (TCH)	9.900	9.675	19.575
7	Zheng Sihua (CHN)	9.800	9.725	19.525
8	Leslie Pyfer (USA)	9.750	9.725	19.475

== Medals ==
Rank	Nation	Gold	Silver	Bronze	Total
1	Soviet Union (URS)	5	7	5	17
2	United States (USA)	3	3	2	8
3	Romania (ROU)	3	1	3	7
4	East Germany (GDR)	2	1	4	7
5	China (People's Republic of China)	1	0	0	1
5	Czechoslovakia (TCH)	1	0	0	1
5	Hungary (HUN)	1	0	0	1
8	Japan (JPN)	0	1	1	2
Totals (8 entries)		16	13	15	44
