= 1979 European Women's Artistic Gymnastics Championships =

12th European Women's Artistic Gymnastics Championships
- Location: Copenhagen, Denmark
- Dates: 11–12 May 1979

The 12th European Women's Artistic Gymnastics Championships were held in Copenhagen, Denmark on 11-12 May 1979.

== Medalists ==
Event	Gold	Silver	Bronze
Seniors
All-Around	Nadia Comăneci (ROU)	Emilia Eberle (ROU)	Natalia Shaposhnikova (URS)
Vault	Nadia Comăneci (ROU)	Maxi Gnauck (GDR)	Natalia Shaposhnikova (URS)
Uneven Bars	Elena Mukhina (URS)	Emilia Eberle (ROU)	Maxi Gnauck (GDR)
Balance Beam	Natalia Shaposhnikova (URS)	Emilia Eberle (ROU)	Nadia Comăneci (ROU)
Floor	Nadia Comăneci (ROU)	Elena Mukhina (URS); Natalia Shaposhnikova (URS)	

== Results ==
=== All-around ===
Rank	Gymnast	Vault (gymnastics)	Uneven bars	Balance beam	Floor (gymnastics)	Total
1st place, gold medalist(s)	Nadia Comăneci (ROU)	9.900	9.900	9.900	9.750	39.450
2nd place, silver medalist(s)	Emilia Eberle (ROU)	9.800	9.750	9.800	9.500	38.850
3rd place, bronze medalist(s)	Natalia Shaposhnikova (URS)	9.650	9.600	9.950	9.550	38.750
4	Elena Mukhina (URS)	9.750	9.850	9.450	9.650	38.700
5	Melita Ruhn (ROM)	9.650	9.550	9.600	9.350	38.150
6	Věra Černá (TCH)	9.500	9.750	9.350	9.400	38.000
6	Eva Marečková (TCH)	9.450	9.600	9.550	9.400	38.000
6	Maxi Gnauck (GDR)	9.700	9.800	9.300	9.200	38.000
9	Katharina Rensch (GDR)	9.450	9.550	9.050	9.450	37.500
10	Łucja Matraszek (POL)	9.300	9.500	9.500	9.150	37.450
11	Krasimira Toneva (BUL)	9.450	9.450	9.150	9.200	37.250
11	Éva Óvári (HUN)	9.450	9.500	9.050	9.250	37.250
13	Zsuzsa Kalmár (HUN)	9.300	9.550	9.550	8.800	37.200
14	Irina Goreva (BUL)	9.300	9.500	9.450	8.850	37.100
15	Andrea Horacsek (HUN)	9.450	9.400	8.850	9.300	37.000
15	Martine Pidoux (FRA)	9.450	9.300	9.000	9.250	37.000
17	Elena Naimushina (URS)	9.500	8.650	9.250	9.500	36.900
18	Romi Kessler (SUI)	9.300	9.400	9.400	8.700	36.800
19	Małgorzata Majza (POL)	9.200	9.250	9.250	9.050	36.750
19	Elżbieta Szewczak (POL)	9.250	9.350	9.000	9.150	36.750
21	Martina Malušová (TCH)	9.500	9.500	9.000	8.700	36.700
22	Gloria Viseras (ESP)	9.150	9.150	9.250	9.100	36.650
23	Annette Michler (FRG)	9.200	9.150	9.200	9.000	36.550
24	Diliana Glucheva (BUL)	9.400	8.800	8.950	9.350	36.500
24	Hanne Kraft (NOR)	9.200	9.250	9.150	8.900	36.500
26	Susan Cheesebrough (GBR)	9.150	9.400	8.950	8.900	36.400
27	Unni Holmen (NOR)	9.100	9.400	9.150	8.700	36.350
28	Jana Bore (NOR)	9.300	8.900	9.200	8.900	36.300
28	Véronique Sanguinetti (FRA)	9.200	9.400	8.750	8.950	36.300
30	Marijke Aarnhouts (NED)	9.200	9.200	8.850	9.000	36.250
31	Eloisa Marcos (ESP)	9.250	9.200	8.800	8.850	36.100
32	Lena Adomat (SWE)	9.250	9.200	8.750	8.850	36.050
32	Laura Bortolaso (ITA)	9.400	9.200	9.050	8.400	36.050
34	Ingrid Bolleboom (NED)	9.050	8.750	9.150	9.050	36.000
35	Denise Jones (GBR)	9.350	8.850	9.000	8.750	35.950
36	Karola Sube (GDR)	9.400	9.550	8.800	8.900	35.850
36	Era Canevascini (ITA)	9.050	9.300	8.850	8.650	35.850
38	Marinella Giorgini (ITA)	8.950	9.000	8.850	8.850	35.650
38	Annika Fritzen (SWE)	9.100	9.250	8.250	9.050	35.650
38	Anne Hervé (FRA)	9.100	9.050	8.500	9.000	35.650
41	Brigitte Girardin (SUI)	9.250	8.700	8.700	8.900	35.550
42	Sabine Blumtritt (FRG)	9.350	8.350	8.750	8.850	35.300
43	Raija Koivisto (FIN)	9.100	8.850	8.550	8.600	35.100
44	Monique Bolleboom (NED)	8.400	9.000	8.650	8.950	35.000
45	Liane Stoppel (AUT)	9.000	8.800	8.650	8.500	34.950
45	Susanne Theel (FRG)	9.050	8.900	8.150	8.850	34.950
47	Donatella Grossi (ITA)	9.100	9.200	7.750	8.750	34.800
48	Angeles García (ESP)	9.250	8.350	8.150	8.950	34.700
48	Monika Neuhaus (SWE)	9.100	8.900	8.000	8.700	34.700
50	Ewa Wulff (DEN)	8.700	8.750	8.750	8.300	34.500
51	Brigit Olsen (DEN)	8.700	7.900	8.850	8.700	34.150
52	Jackie Bevan (GBR)	9.250	8.000	8.250	8.550	34.050
53	Christine Bos (BEL)	8.800	8.450	8.000	8.550	33.800
54	Helena Silva (POR)	8.100	8.700	8.200	8.700	33.700
55	Helena Álvarez (POR)	8.000	8.500	8.550	8.550	33.600
56	Aria Kosunen (FIN)	8.300	8.800	7.900	8.300	33.300
57	Vinciane Wertz (BEL)	8.550	8.050	8.150	8.450	33.200
58	Anne Olsen (DEN)	8.000	8.450	7.900	8.600	32.950

=== Vault ===
Rank	Gymnast	Score
1st place, gold medalist(s)	Nadia Comăneci (ROU)	19.850
2nd place, silver medalist(s)	Maxi Gnauck (GDR)	19.550
3rd place, bronze medalist(s)	Natalia Shaposhnikova (URS)	19.525
4	Elena Mukhina (URS)	19.475
5	Martina Malušová (TCH)	19.250
6	Věra Černá (TCH)	19.100
7	Emilia Eberle (ROM)	19.050
8	Katharina Rensch (GDR)	18.975

=== Uneven Bars ===
Rank	Gymnast	Score
1st place, gold medalist(s)	Elena Mukhina (URS)	19.700
2nd place, silver medalist(s)	Emilia Eberle (ROU)	19.650
3rd place, bronze medalist(s)	Maxi Gnauck (GDR)	19.600
4	Nadia Comăneci (ROU)	19.350
5	Eva Marečková (TCH)	19.200
6	Natalia Shaposhnikova (URS)	19.100
7	Katharina Rensch (GDR)	19.000
8	Věra Černá (TCH)	18.950

=== Balance Beam ===
Rank	Gymnast	Score
1st place, gold medalist(s)	Natalia Shaposhnikova (URS)	19.850
2nd place, silver medalist(s)	Emilia Eberle (ROU)	19.600
3rd place, bronze medalist(s)	Nadia Comăneci (ROU)	19.250
4	Zsuzsa Kalmár (HUN)	19.100
5	Romi Kessler (SUI)	19.000
6	Łucja Matraszek (POL)	18.800
7	Eva Marečková (TCH)	18.750
8	Irina Goreva (BUL)	18.000

=== Floor ===
Rank	Gymnast	Score
1st place, gold medalist(s)	Nadia Comăneci (ROU)	19.600
2nd place, silver medalist(s)	Natalia Shaposhnikova (URS)	19.200
2nd place, silver medalist(s)	Elena Mukhina (URS)	19.200
4	Katharina Rensch (GDR)	19.150
4	Emilia Eberle (ROU)	19.150
6	Věra Černá (TCH)	18.950
6	Eva Marečková (TCH)	18.950
8	Diliana Glucheva (BUL)	18.450
