= Melitta Rühn =

Romanian artistic gymnast

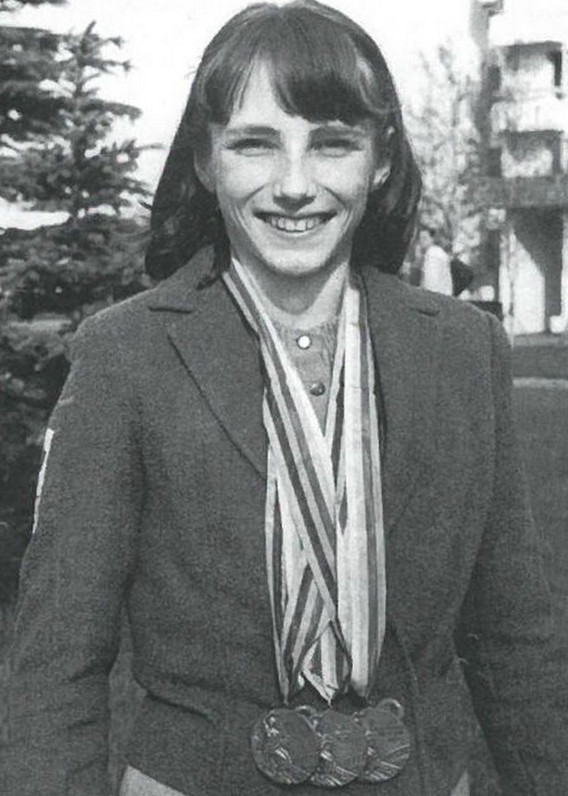
- Rühn in 1980

Personal information
- Born: 19 April 1965 (age 61) Sibiu, Romania
- Height: 156 cm (5 ft 1 in)

Gymnastics career
- Discipline: Women's artistic gymnastics
- Country represented: Romania (1979–1982)
- Head coach: Béla Károlyi
- Assistant coach: Marta Károlyi
- Former coaches: Ana Crihan, Adrian Goreac
- Choreographer: Geza Poszar
- Retired: 1982
Medal record
Olympic Games
Silver medal – second place	1980 Moscow	Team competition
Bronze medal – third place	1980 Moscow	Vault
Bronze medal – third place	1980 Moscow	Uneven bars
World Championships
Gold medal – first place	1979 Fort Worth	Team competition
Bronze medal – third place	1979 Fort Worth	All around
Bronze medal – third place	1979 Fort Worth	Floor

Melitta Rühn (later Fleischer, born 19 April 1965) is a retired Romanian artistic gymnast who represented Romania at the 1980 Summer Olympics. She belongs to the German minority in Romania. She won three Olympic medals (team, vault, uneven bars) for Romania and scored a perfect ten for the vault optionals in the team competition of the 1980 Olympic Games. In 1979 she was a member of the first world gold medal-winning team of Romania. She is also an all around and floor world bronze medalist.

== Career ==
Rühn took up gymnastics aged seven at Sport School Club Sibiu coached by Ana Crihan and Adrian Goreac. Later she trained with the national team in Deva under coach Béla Károlyi. Her first major international competition was the 1979 European Championships in Copenhagen where she placed fifth in the all-around final event.

Together with Nadia Comăneci, Rodica Dunca, Emilia Eberle, Dumitriţa Turner and Marilena Vlădărău, Rühn was a member of the gold-winning team at the 1979 World Artistic Gymnastics Championships. This was the first time that Romania won the team event at the world championships and the second time the Soviet team had not won the world or the Olympic title since 1952. Melitta did all the four events and contributed with a difficult and risky routine on the uneven bars. Individually she won the bronze medals in the all around and in the floor event and placed seventh on vault and eighth on balance beam.

In 1980 she was a member of the silver-winning Romanian team at the 1980 Olympic Games. She revealed for a newspaper that just before the Moscow Olympics she fractured her ankle. The ankle was put in a cast, and coach Károlyi took it off before the vault event. She scored a 10 and the cast was placed back on her ankle. Besides winning silver with the team she won the bronze medal on vault and on uneven bars. The bronze on the uneven bars was a tie with Steffi Kräker and Maria Filatova.

== Post-retirement ==
Rühn retired from competitive gymnastics in 1982, when she was 17. She finished high school in her native Sibiu and left for Bucharest in 1984. She went to the sports university there, while also competing for her home club of CSȘ Sibiu for a short period. After she graduated from college, she had a boyfriend, who emigrated to Germany with his family in 1988. They wanted to get married but the Romanian communist government only gave them their approval two years later, so she only managed to leave Romania in 1990. In Germany she stayed for the first three months in a refugee camp near Nürnberg sharing the same room with six people. Then she was allowed to move in together with her boyfriend. The former gymnast started working as a custodian.

== Competitive history ==
Year	Event	Team	AA	VT	UB	BB	FX
Junior
1978	Junior GDR-ROM Dual Meet	2nd place, silver medalist(s)		1st place, gold medalist(s)			
Senior
1979
1979	European Championships		5				
1979	GBR-ROM Dual Meet	1st place, gold medalist(s)	3rd place, bronze medalist(s)				
1979	International Championships of Romania		4				
1979	NOR-ROM Dual Meet	1st place, gold medalist(s)	3rd place, bronze medalist(s)				
1979	World Championships	1st place, gold medalist(s)	3rd place, bronze medalist(s)	7		8	3rd place, bronze medalist(s)
1980	GBR-ROM Dual Meet	1st place, gold medalist(s)	3rd place, bronze medalist(s)				
1980	HOL-ROM Dual Meet	1st place, gold medalist(s)	2nd place, silver medalist(s)				
1980	International Championships of Romania		2nd place, silver medalist(s)				
1980	ROM-NED Dual Meet	1st place, gold medalist(s)	1st place, gold medalist(s)				
1980	Olympic Games	2nd place, silver medalist(s)		3rd place, bronze medalist(s)	3rd place, bronze medalist(s)		
