= Artistic Gymnastics World Cup – Women's individual all-around =

Women's events at the Artistic Gymnastics World Cup were first held at the 1975 FIG Artistic Gymnastics World Cup.

Three medals are awarded: gold for first place, silver for second place, and bronze for third place. Tie breakers have not been used in every year. In the event of a tie between two gymnasts, both names are listed, and the following position (second for a tie for first, third for a tie for second) is left empty because a medal was not awarded for that position. If three gymnastics tied for a position, the following two positions are left empty.

== Medalists ==
Year	Location	Gold	Silver	Bronze
1975	(United Kingdom) London	(Soviet Union) Ludmilla Tourischeva	(Soviet Union) Olga Korbut	(Hungary) Márta Egervári (Soviet Union) Elvira Saadi
1977	(Spain) Oviedo	(Soviet Union) Maria Filatova	(East Germany) Steffi Kräker	(Soviet Union) Natalia Shaposhnikova
1978	(Brazil) São Paulo	(Soviet Union) Maria Filatova	(East Germany) Silvia Hindorff	(Soviet Union) Natalia Shaposhnikova
1979	(Japan) Tokyo	(Soviet Union) Stella Zakharova	(Soviet Union) Nellie Kim (Romania) Emilia Eberle	-
1980	(Canada) Toronto	(Soviet Union) Stella Zakharova	(East Germany) Maxi Gnauck	(East Germany) Steffi Kräker
1982	(Socialist Federal Republic of Yugoslavia) Zagreb	(Soviet Union) Natalia Yurchenko (Soviet Union) Olga Bicherova	-	(Romania) Lavinia Agache
1986	(China) Beijing	(Soviet Union) Elena Shushunova	(Romania) Daniela Silivaş	(Soviet Union) Oksana Omelianchik
1990	(Belgium) Brussels	(Soviet Union) Tatiana Lysenko	(Soviet Union) Svetlana Boguinskaya	(Hungary) Henrietta Ónodi
