= Silviya Topalova =

Bulgarian gymnast (born 1964)

- Силвия Топалова
- Alternative name(s): Silvia
- Born: 7 March 1964 (age 61)

Gymnastics career
- Discipline: Women's artistic gymnastics
- Country represented: Bulgaria

Silviya Topalova (Bulgarian: Силвия Топалова; born 7 March 1964) is a Bulgarian gymnast. She competed in six events at the 1980 Summer Olympics.

== Personal life ==
Topalova was friends with Maya Blagoeva, a fellow artistic gymnast who competed at the 1972 Olympics. Blagoeva named her daughter, Silvia Mitova, after Topalova.

== Career ==
Topalova competed at five consecutive World Championships from 1978 to 1985, making the all-around final at all but her last. At her first World Championships in 1978, she finished in 32nd place. The next year, at the 1979 World Championships, she placed 20th.

She represented Bulgaria at the 1980 Summer Olympics. In the all-around, she placed 15th, the top placement among the Bulgarian women.

At the 1981 European Championships, she placed 16th in the all-around. She also competed at the World Championships that year and finished in 22nd place.

In 1983, she competed at the World Championships, where she finished in 13th place in the all-around and placed 6th in the uneven bars final. In 1984, due to the Soviet boycott of the 1984 Olympics, she competed at the Friendship Games instead, and she placed 6th in the uneven bars final.

At the 1985 European Championships, she placed 26th in the all-around. Her last major event was the 1985 World Championships, where she placed 4th in the team event with her Bulgarian teammates.

After her competitive career ended, in 1990, Topalova moved to Mexico to work there as a coach. Her students included Brenda Magaña. In September 2002, she moved to another coaching job in Puerto Rico. She coached the Puerto Rican national team for some time, and her student Lorena Quiñones competed at the 2012 Summer Olympics. She is also qualified as a judge. In 2022, she began coaching in Pennsylvania with her former teammate Dima Raynova.
