= Antoaneta =

Antoaneta is a Bulgarian given name. Notable people with this name include the following:

- Antoaneta Boneva (born 1986), Bulgarian shooter
- Antoaneta Frenkeva (born 1971), Bulgarian swimmer
- Antoaneta Pandjerova (born 1977), Bulgarian tennis player
- Antoaneta Rakhneva (born 1962), Bulgarian gymnast
- Antoaneta Stefanova (born 1979), Bulgarian chess player
- Antoaneta Strumenlieva (born 1968), Bulgarian swimmer
- Antoaneta Todorova (born 1963), Bulgarian javelin athlete
- Antoaneta Tsankova (born 2011), Bulgarian rhythmic gymnast
- Antoaneta Vassileva (born 1960), Bulgarian economist

== See also ==
- Antoneta Papapavli
