= Lo Ok-sil =

North Korean gymnast

Personal information
- Nationality: North Korean
- Born: 15 April 1966 (age 58)

Sport
- Sport: Gymnastics

Lo Ok-sil (born 15 April 1966) is a North Korean gymnast. She competed in six events at the 1980 Summer Olympics.
