= Marina Sulicich =

Australian gymnast

Personal information
- Nationality: Australian
- Born: 18 February 1964 (age 61)

Sport
- Sport: Gymnastics

Marina Sulicich (born 18 February 1964) is an Australian gymnast. She competed in five events at the 1980 Summer Olympics.
