= Aleksandr Tkachyov (gymnast) =

Olympic gymnast

- Born: 4 November 1957 (age 69) Semiluki, Voronezh Oblast, Russian SFSR, Soviet Union

Gymnastics career
- Discipline: Men's artistic gymnastics
- Country represented: Soviet Union
Medal record
Olympic Games
Gold medal – first place	1980 Moscow	Team
Gold medal – first place	1980 Moscow	Parallel bars
Silver medal – second place	1980 Moscow	Rings
World Championships
Gold medal – first place	1979 Fort Worth	Team
Gold medal – first place	1981 Moscow	Team
Gold medal – first place	1981 Moscow	Horizontal bar
Silver medal – second place	1978 Strasbourg	Team
Silver medal – second place	1979 Fort Worth	Parallel bars
Silver medal – second place	1979 Fort Worth	Horizontal bar
Bronze medal – third place	1979 Fort Worth	All-around
Bronze medal – third place	1979 Fort Worth	Floor exercise
Bronze medal – third place	1979 Fort Worth	Rings
European Championships
Gold medal – first place	1977 Vilnius	Floor exercise
Gold medal – first place	1979 Essen	Horizontal bar
Gold medal – first place	1981 Rome	All-around
Gold medal – first place	1981 Rome	Horizontal bar
Silver medal – second place	1977 Vilnius	All-around
Silver medal – second place	1977 Vilnius	Rings
Silver medal – second place	1977 Vilnius	Horizontal bar
Silver medal – second place	1979 Essen	All-around
Silver medal – second place	1981 Rome	Parallel bar
Bronze medal – third place	1981 Rome	Floor exercise
Bronze medal – third place	1981 Rome	Rings

Aleksandr Vasilyevich Tkachyov (Russian: Александр Васильевич Ткачёв; born 4 November 1957) is a Russian and formerly Soviet gymnast and two times Olympic Champion. He trained in Dynamo, Voronezh. His trainer was USSR national Pyotr Fyodorovich Korchagin. Tkachyov was one of the world's strongest gymnasts between 1977 and 1981. In 1977 Tkachyov performed for the first time a Horizontal Bar element that was later named Tkachev after him and that has become one of the most popular and impressive elements, frequently used on international gymnastics competitions. In 2005–2006, he coached Girls' Compulsory Program at Peninsula Gymnastics in San Mateo, California.

== Achievements (non-Olympic) ==
Year	Event	AA	Team	FX	PH	RG	VT	PB	HB
1976	USSR Championships							3rd	
1977	World Cup	3rd		2nd	3rd	3rd		2nd	1st
1977	European Championships	2nd		1st		2nd			2nd
1977	Universiade							1st	
1977	USSR Championships	2nd				3rd		1st	2nd
1977	USSR Cup	1st							
1978	World Championships		2nd						
1978	World Cup								3rd
1978	USSR Championships	2nd			2nd	3rd		1st	2nd
1978	USSR Cup	2nd							
1979	World Championships	3rd	1st	3rd		3rd		2nd	2nd
1979	European Championships	2nd							1st
1979	USSR Championships				1st			1st	1st
1979	USSR Cup	2nd							
1980	USSR Championships	1st		1st	2nd			1st	1st
1981	World Championships		1st						1st
1981	European Championships	1st		3rd		3rd		2nd	1st
1981	USSR Championships	1st				2nd		1st	3rd
1981	USSR Cup	1st							

== Gallery ==
Execution of Tkatchev straddled

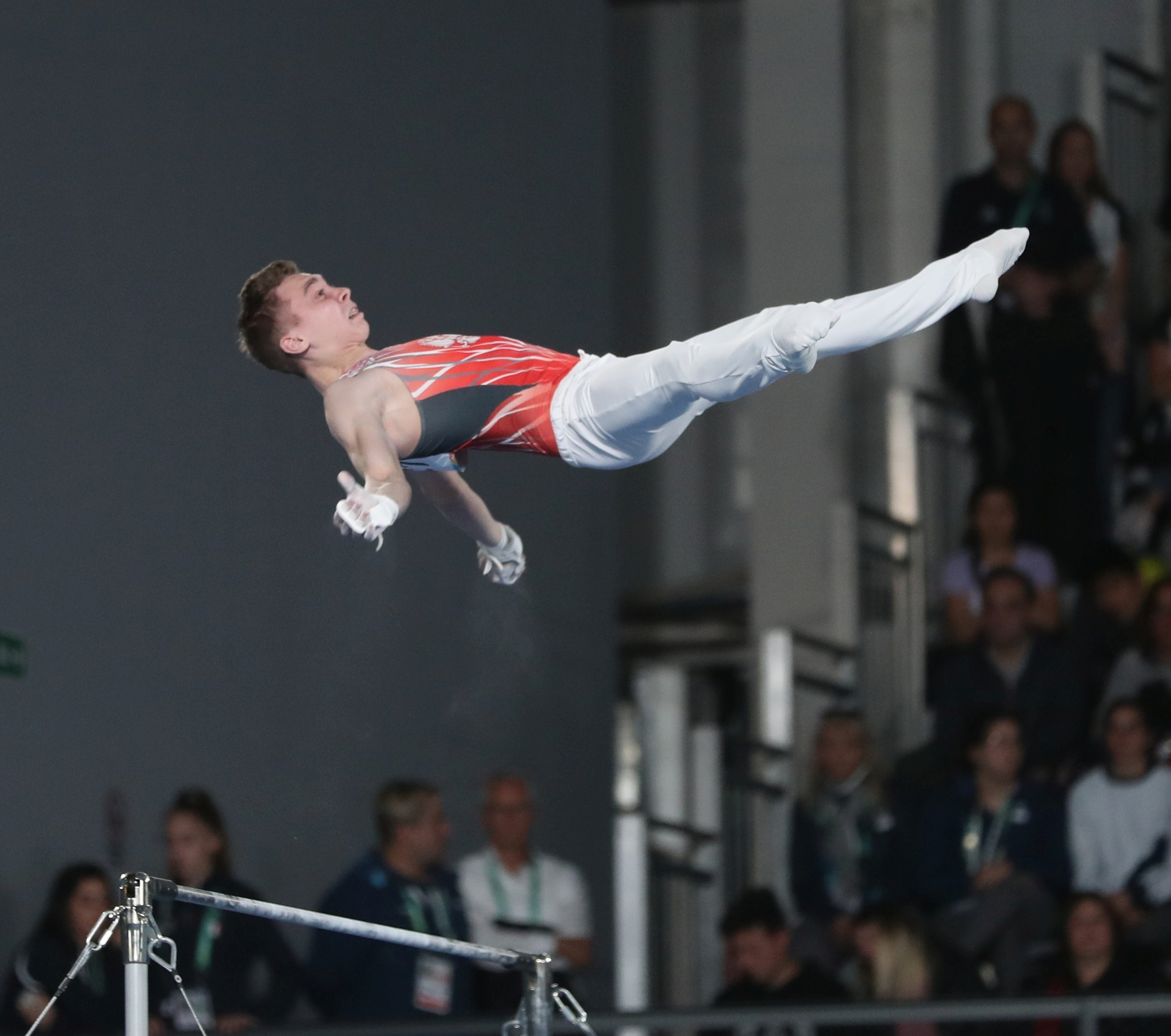
Performed by Sergei Naidin at the 2018 Summer Youth Olympics

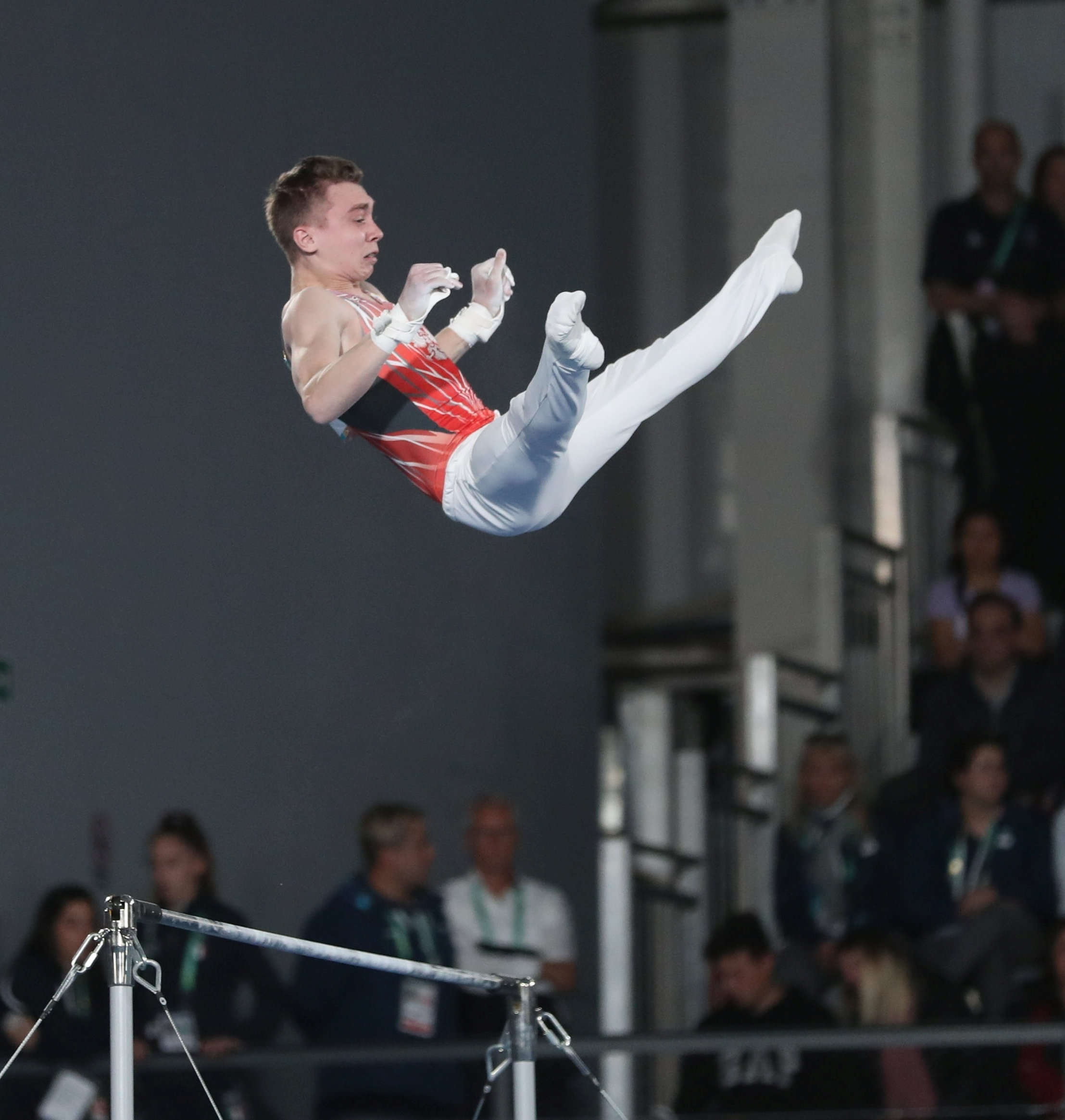

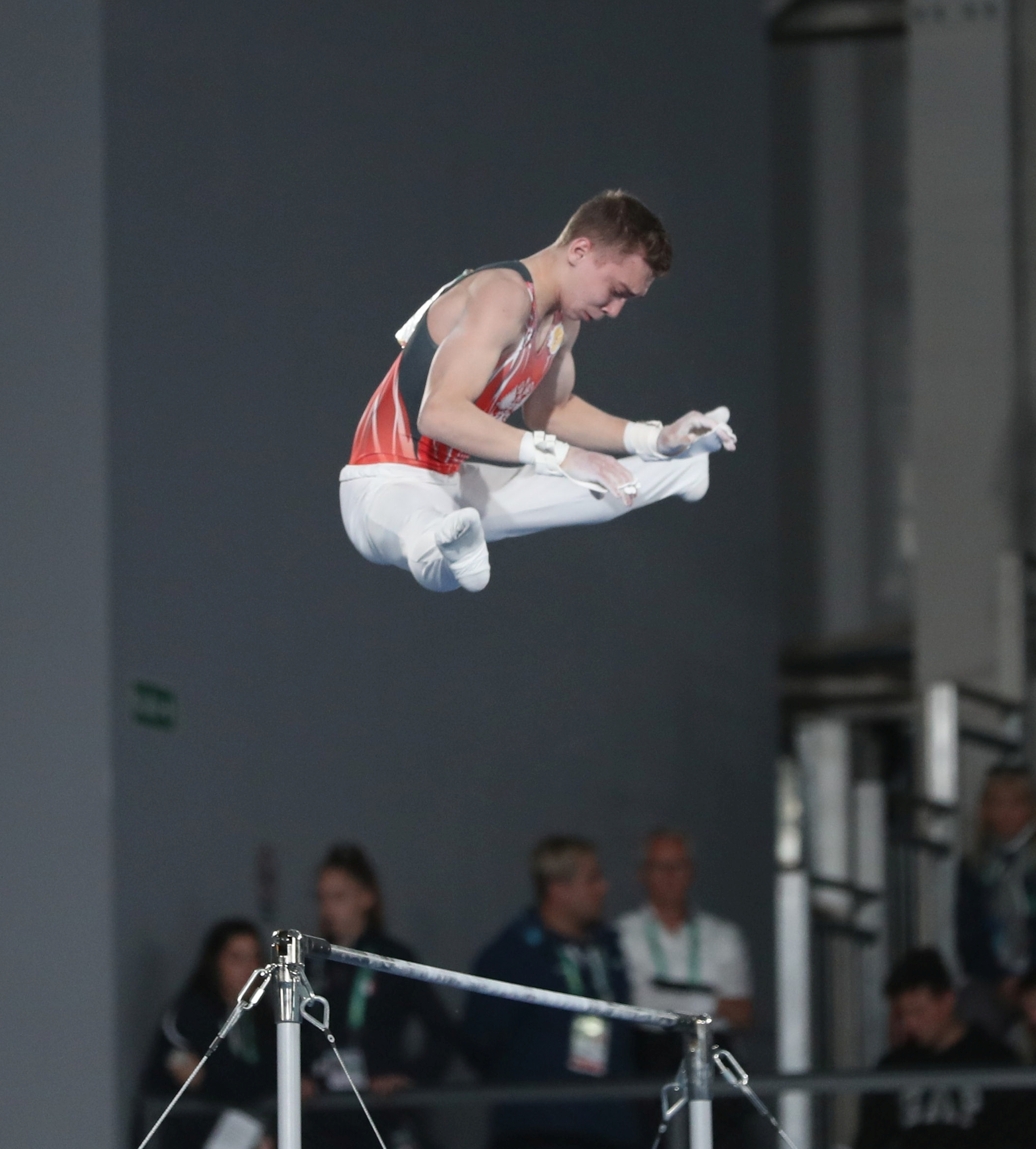

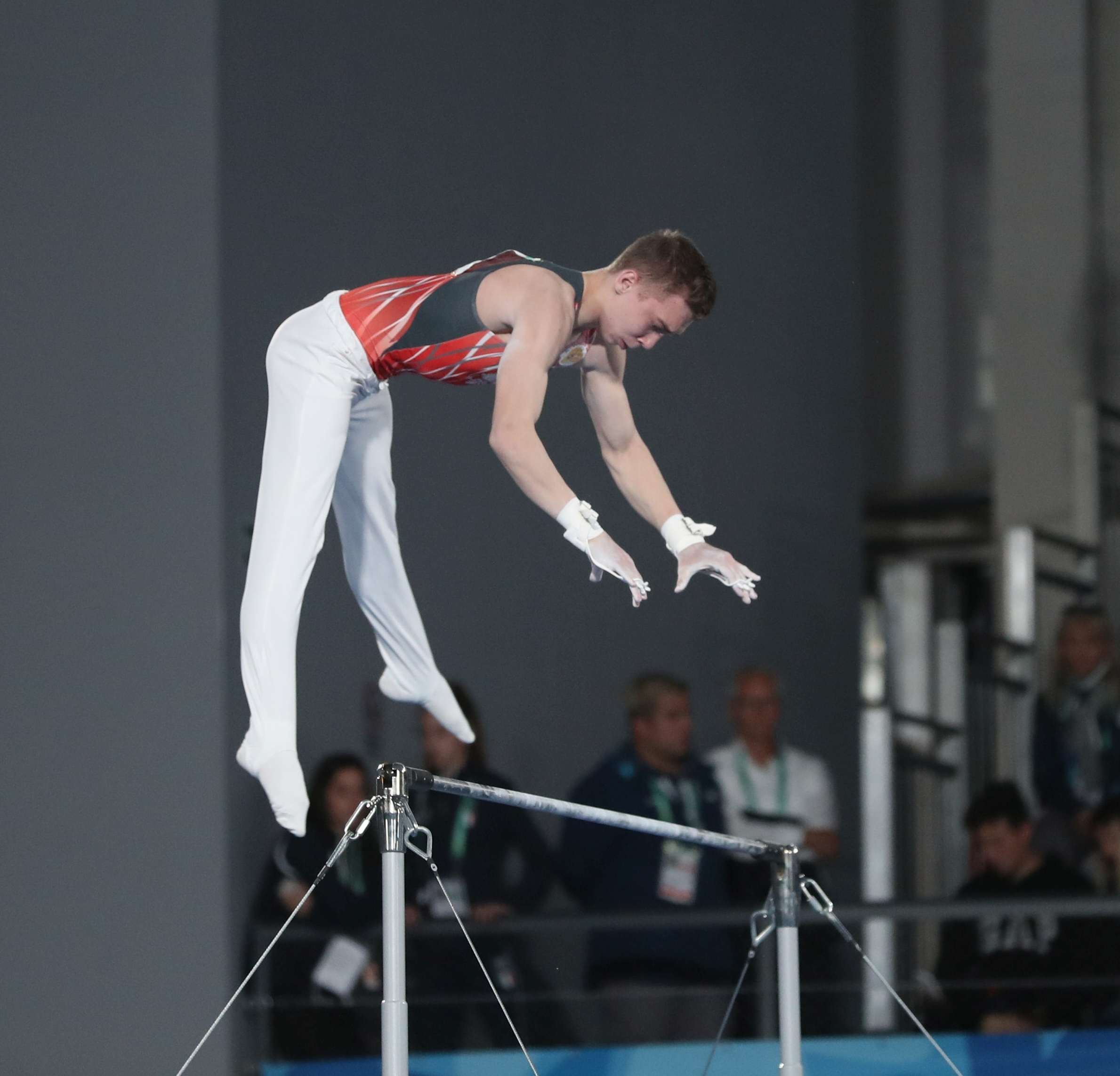

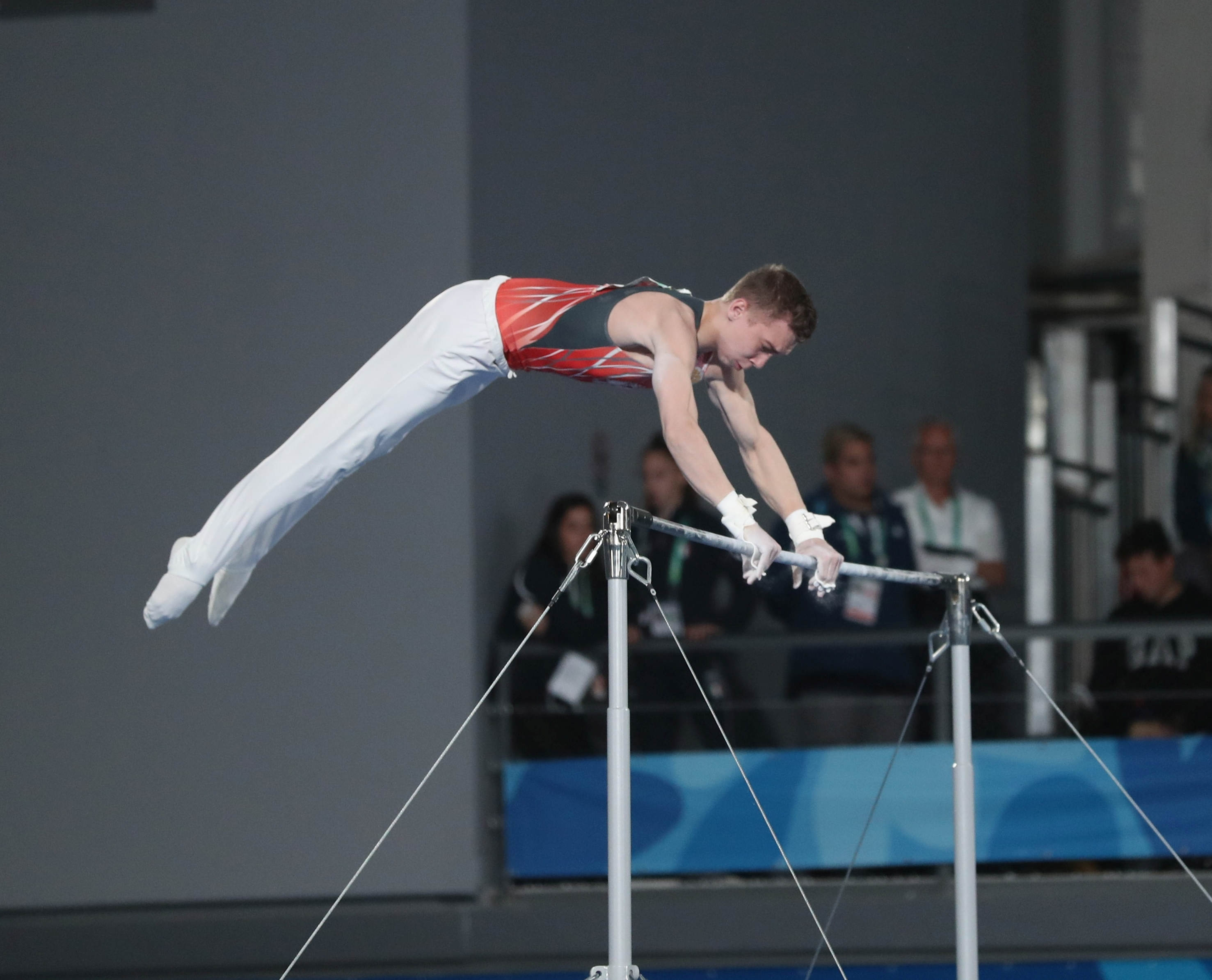
Execution of Tkatchev stretched

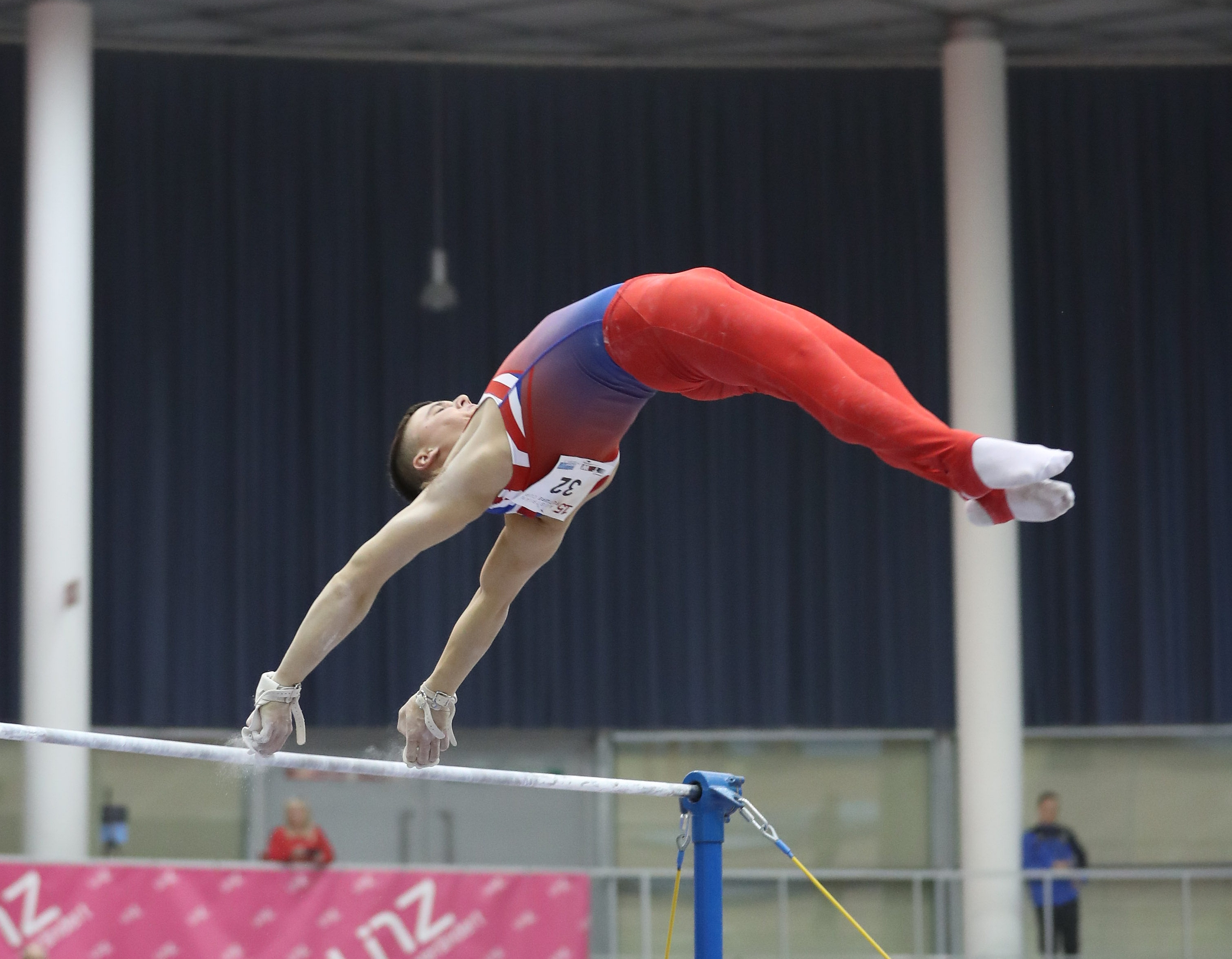
Performed by Matthew Boardman at the Austrian Future Cup 2018

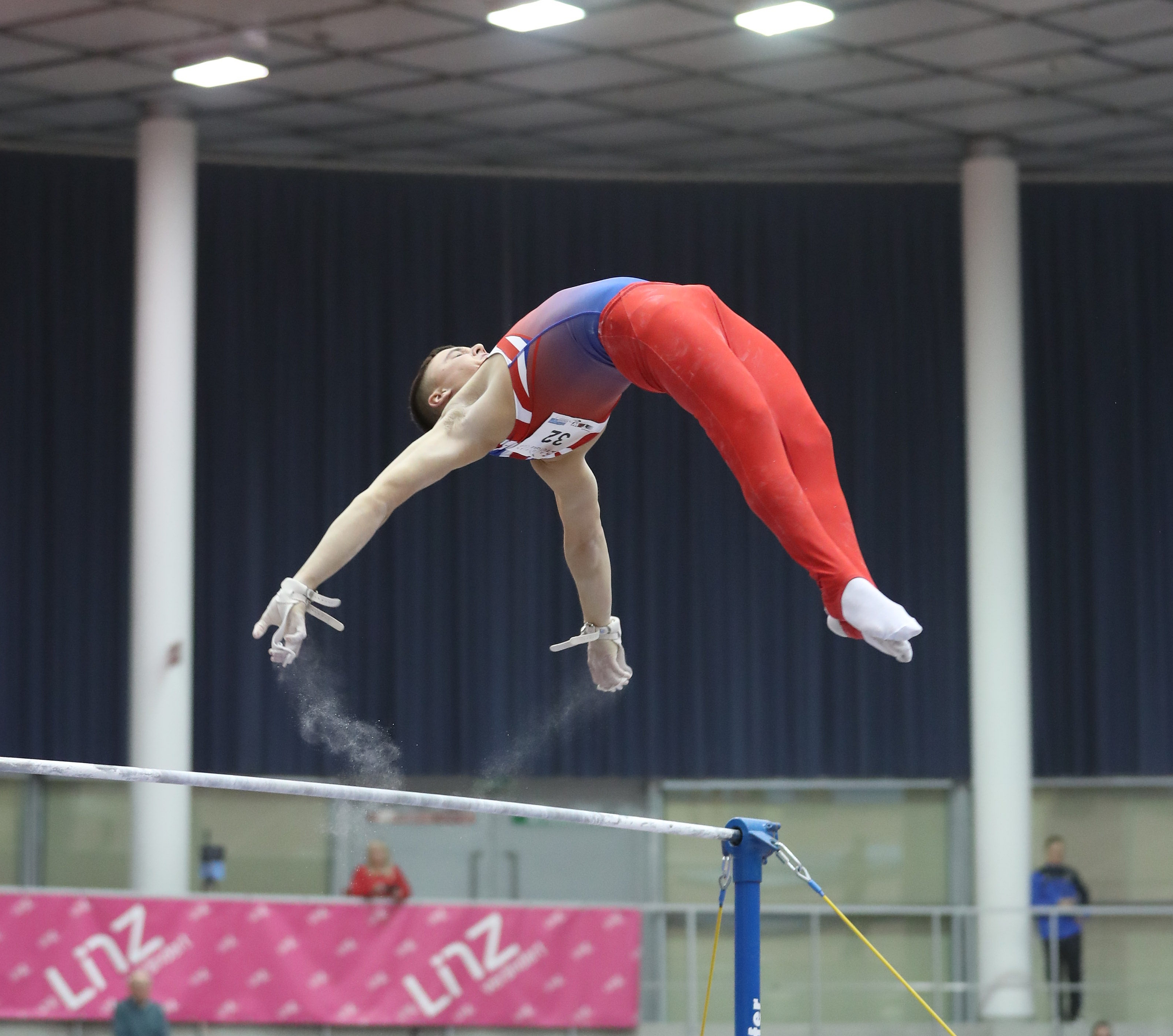

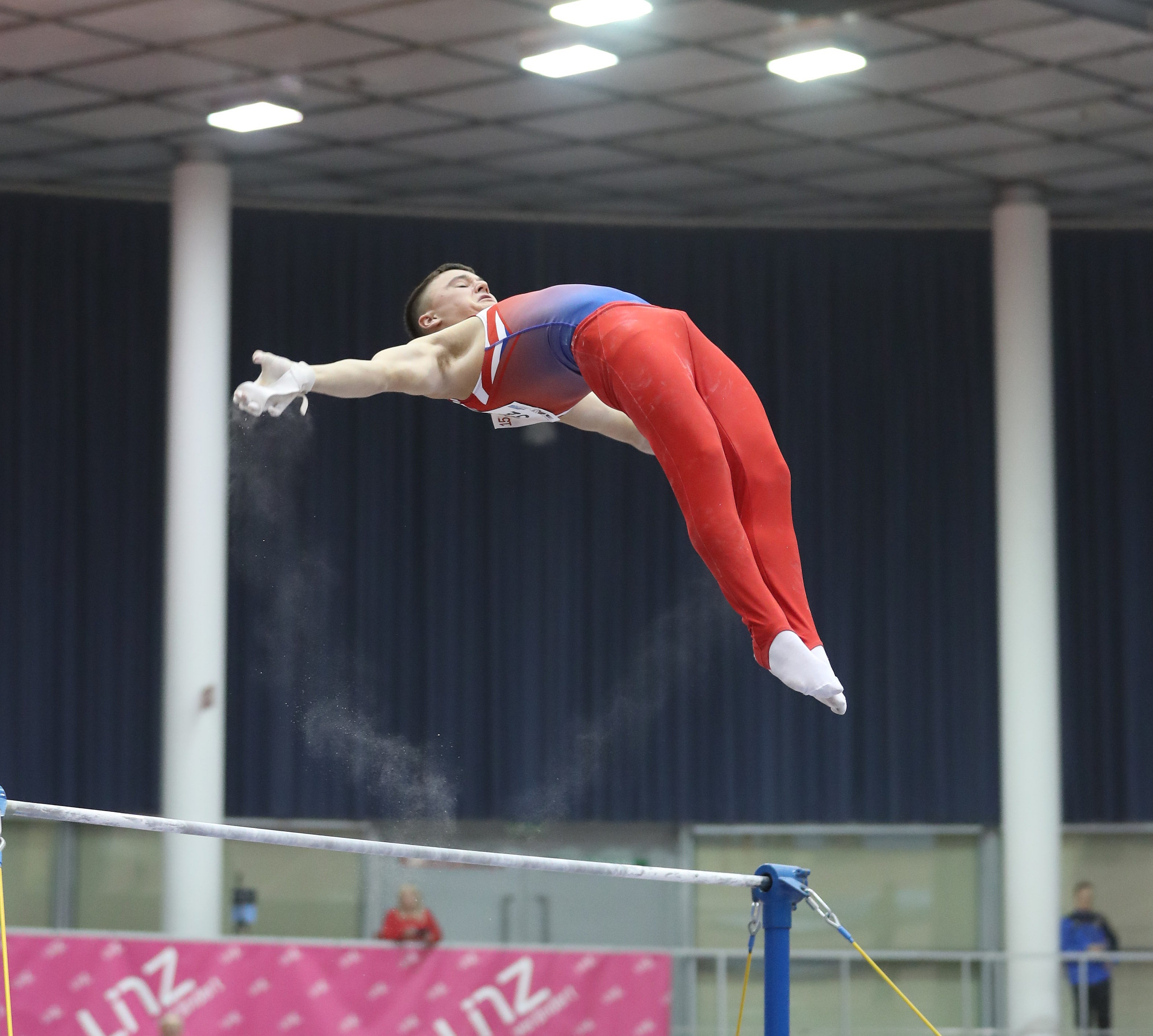

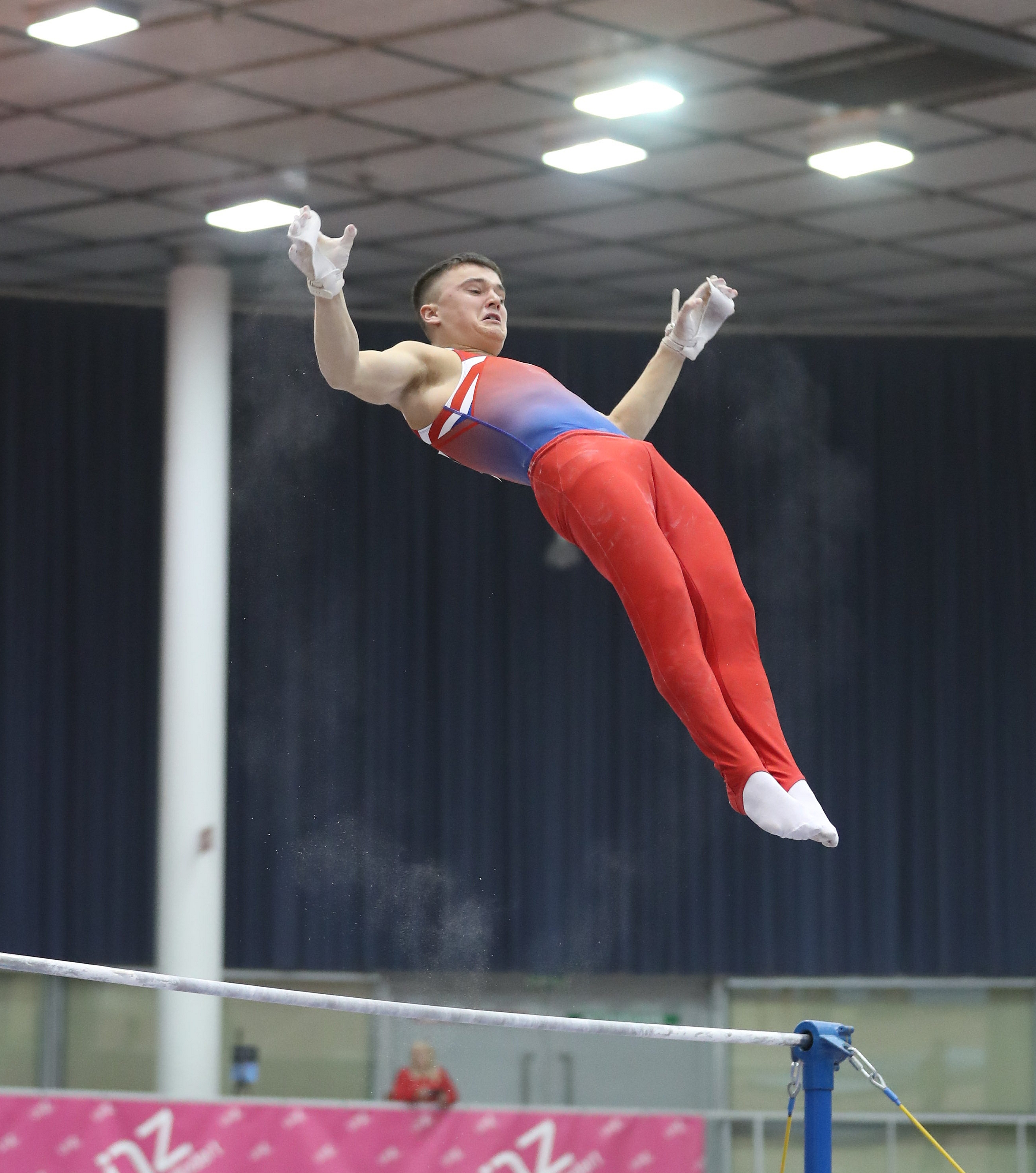

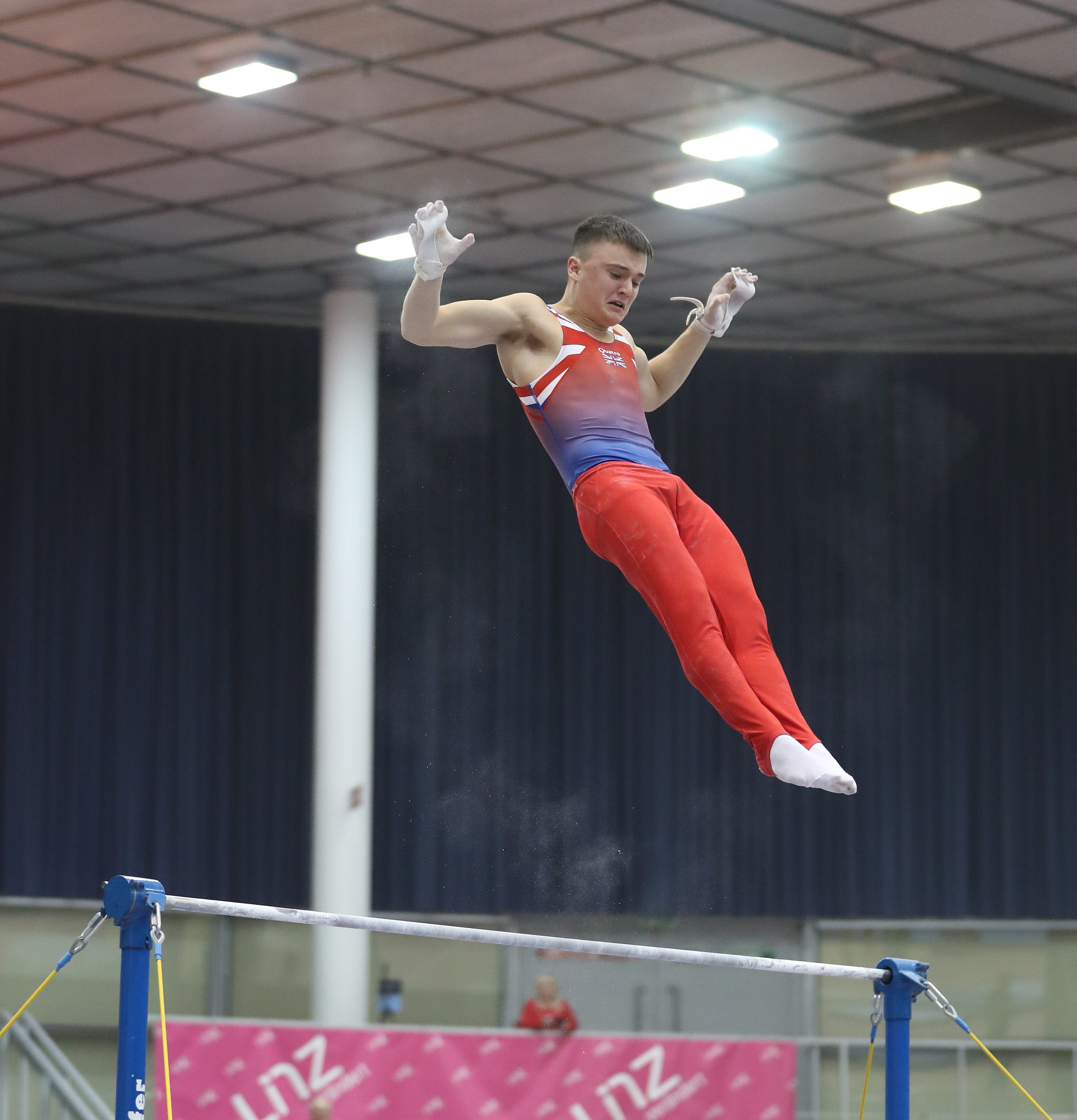

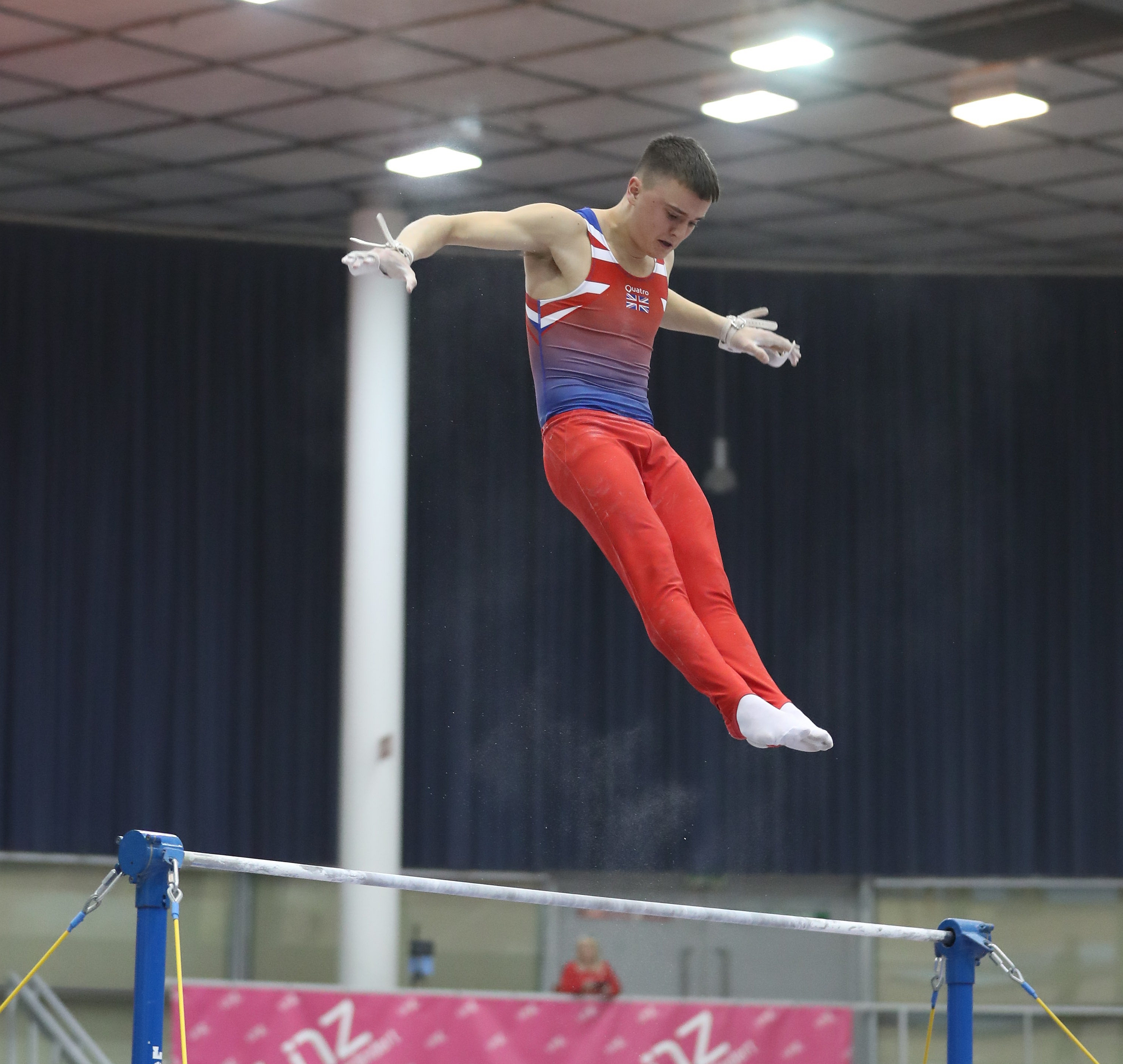

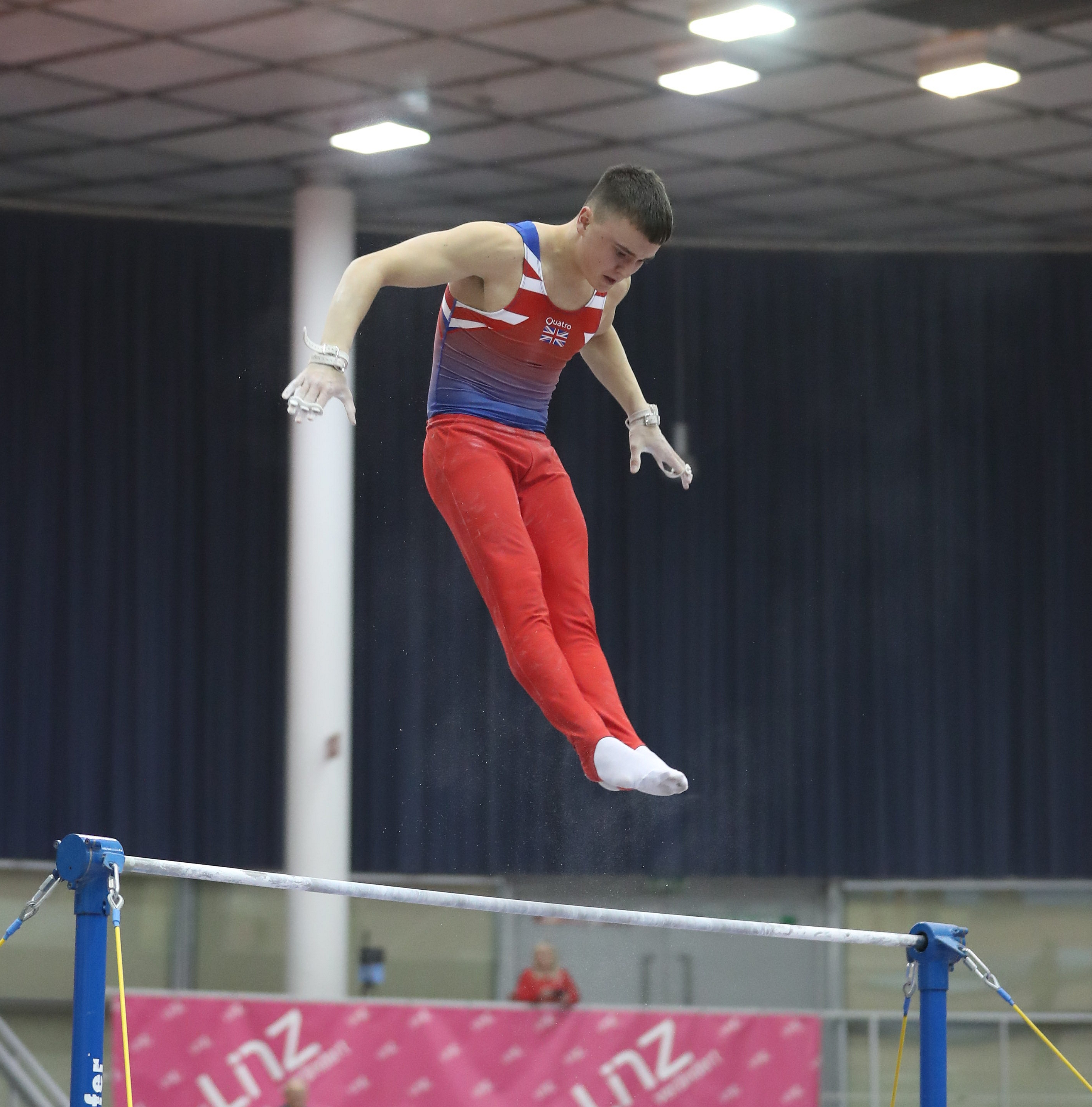

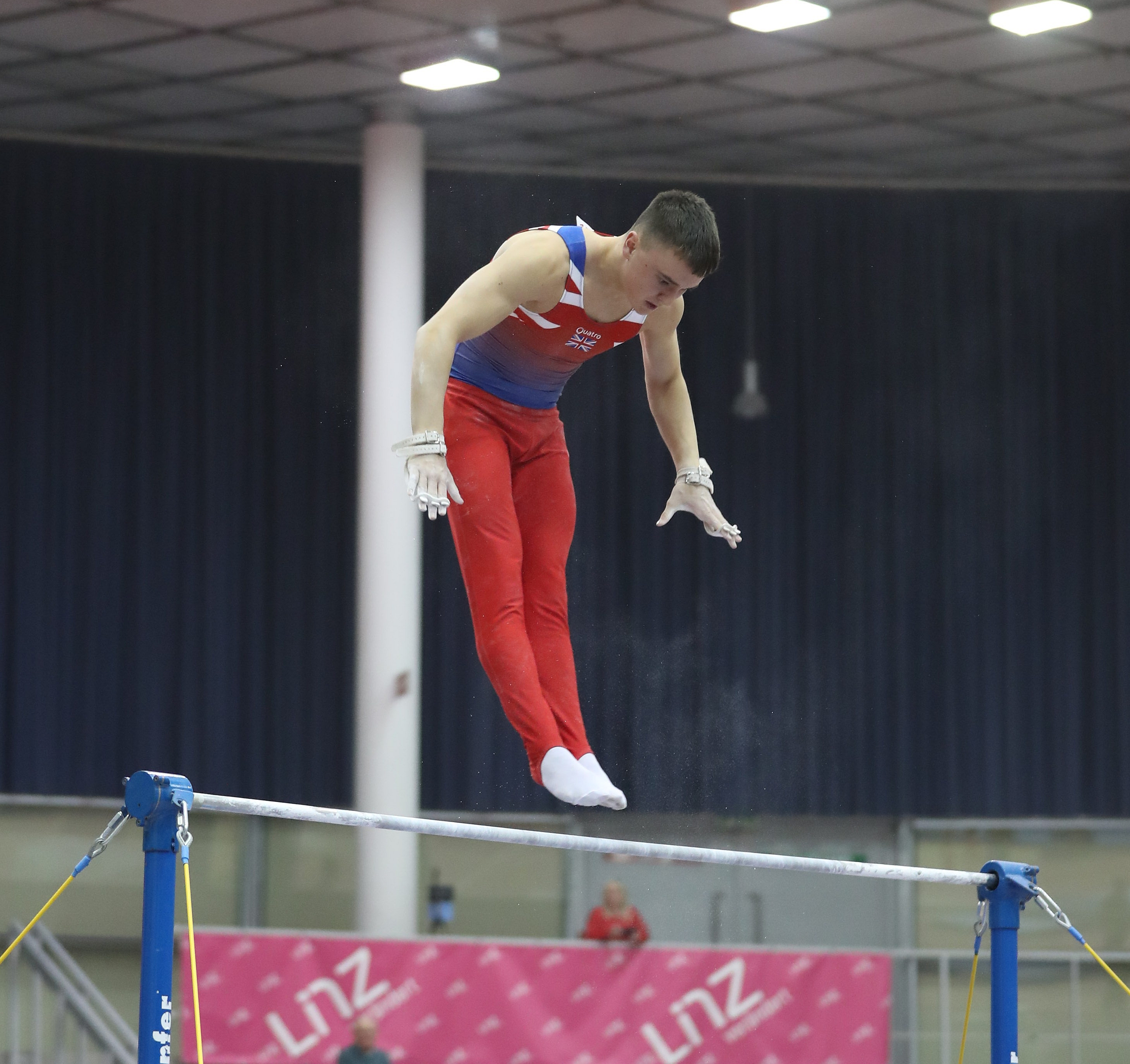

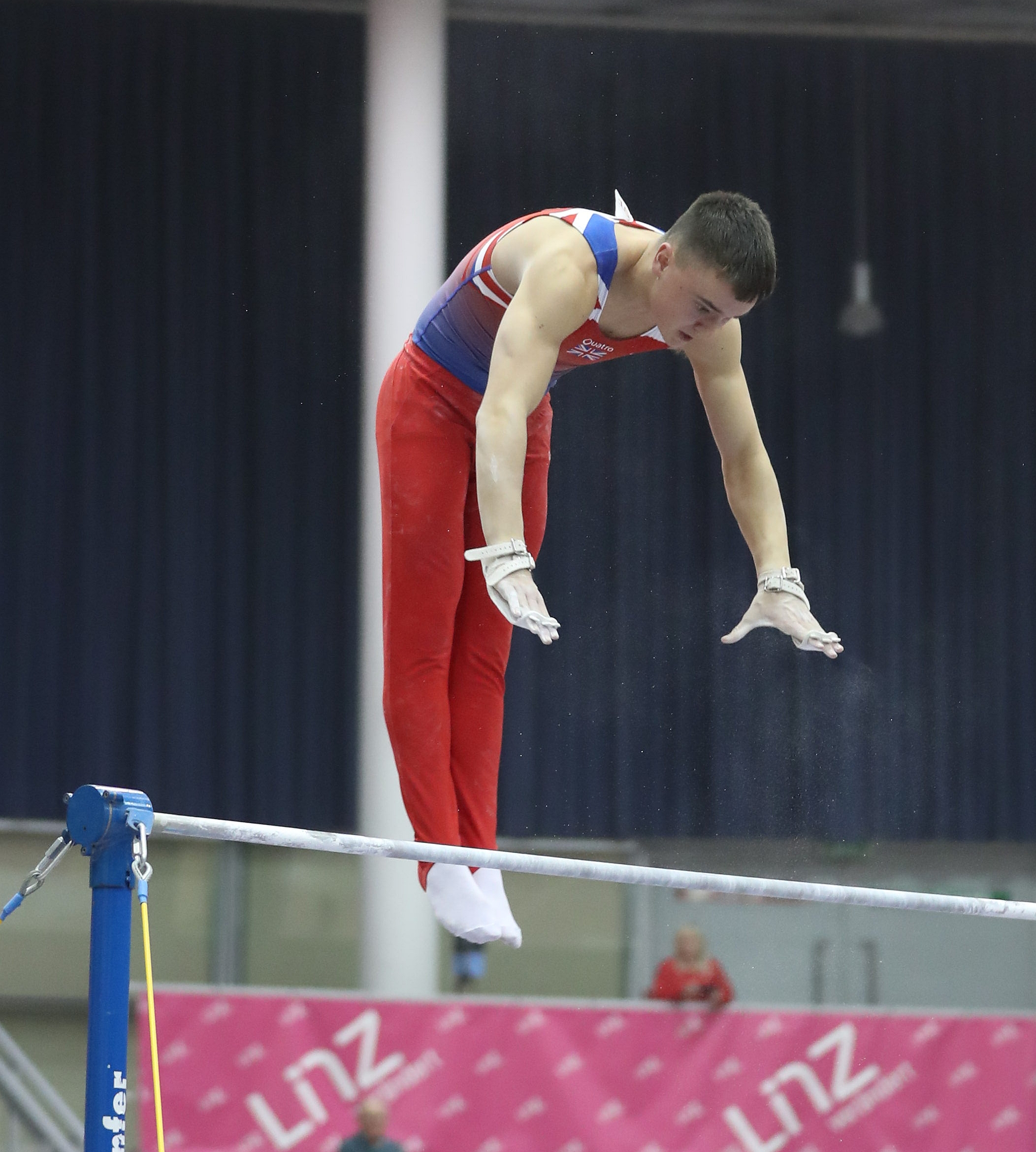

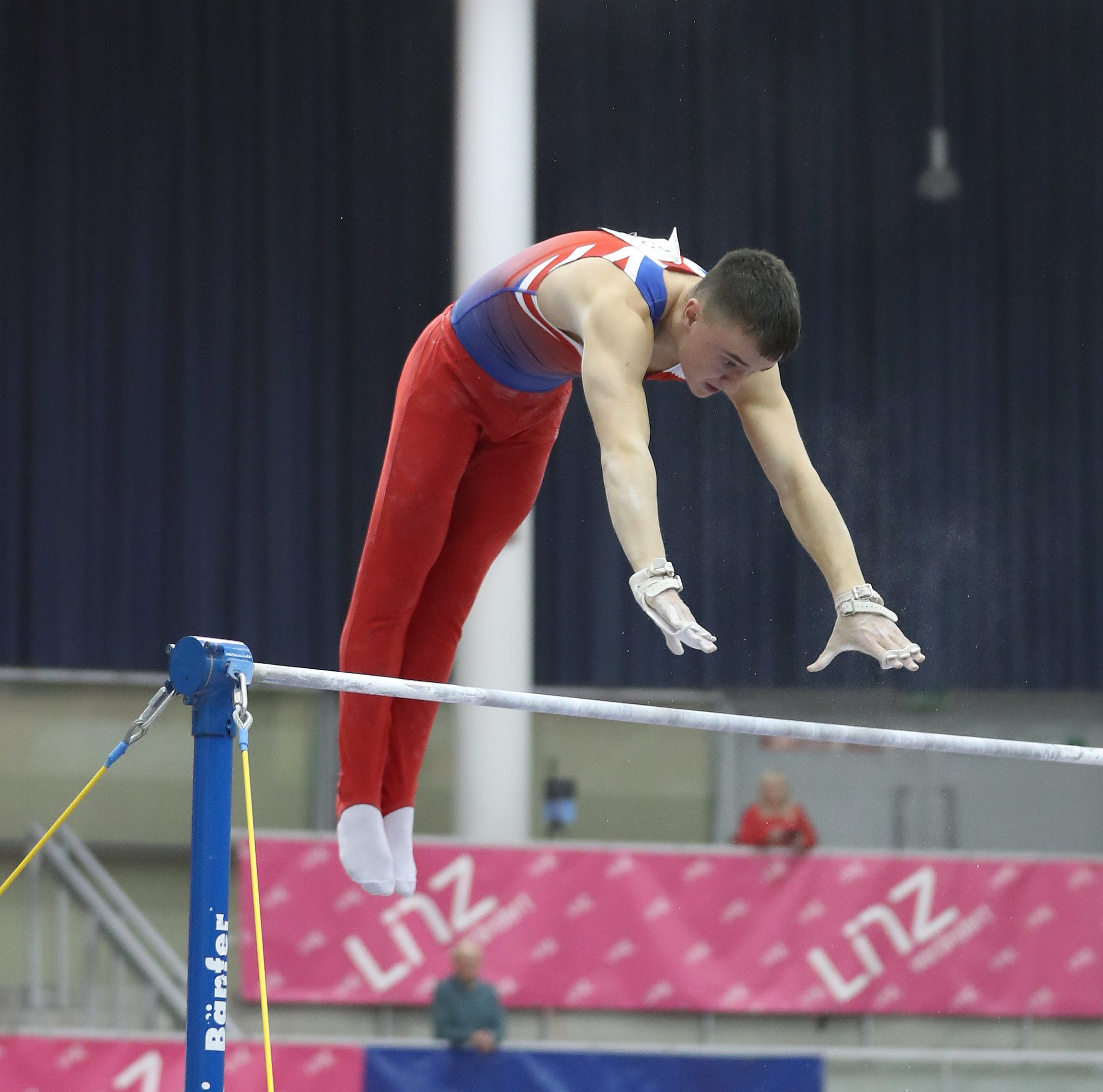

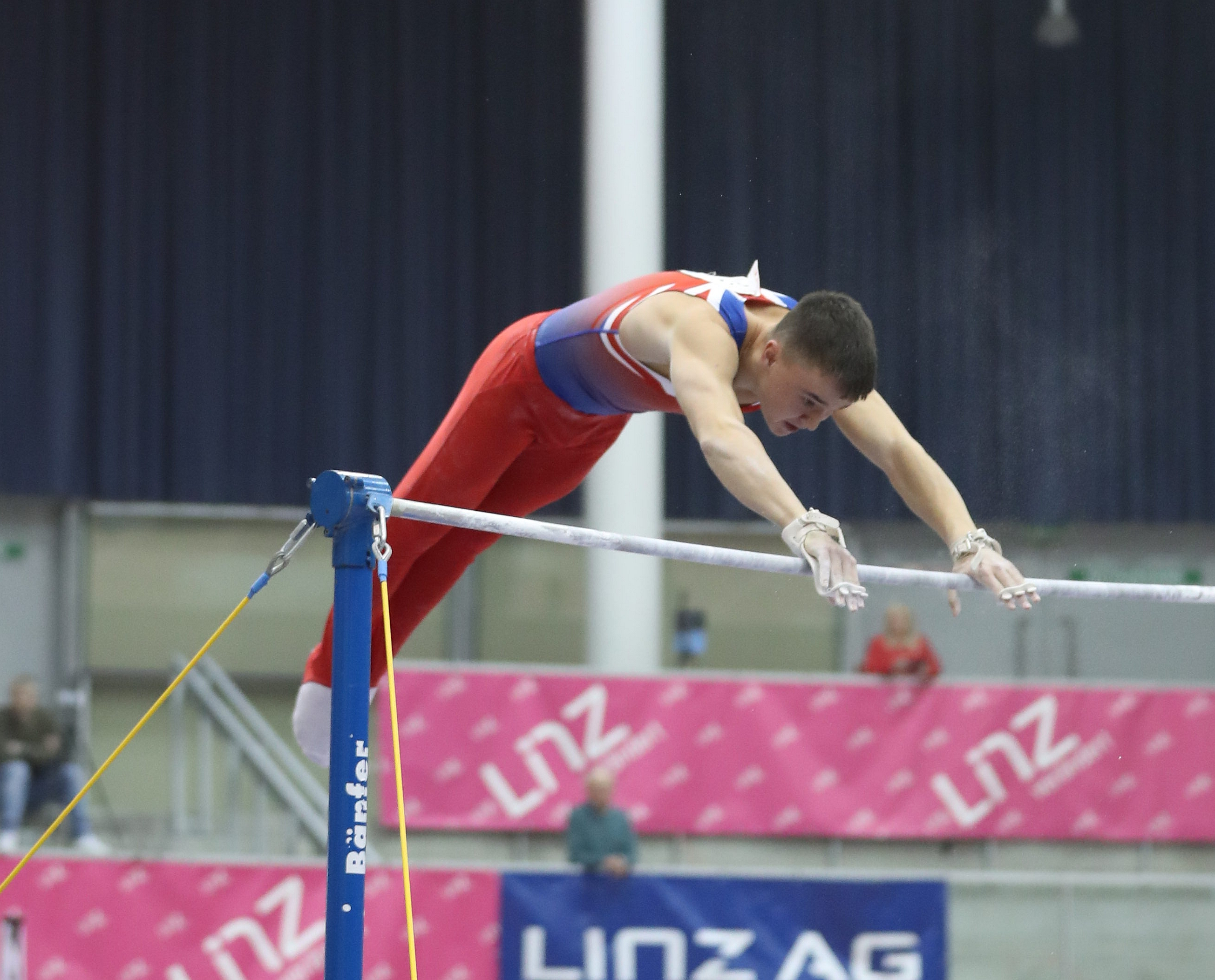
