= Kameliya Eftimova =

Bulgarian gymnast (born 1966)

Personal information
- Nationality: Bulgarian
- Born: 3 May 1966 (age 58)

Sport
- Sport: Gymnastics

Kameliya Eftimova (born 3 May 1966) is a Bulgarian gymnast. She competed in six events at the 1980 Summer Olympics.
