= Dana Brýdlová =

Czech gymnast

Personal information
- Nationality: Czech
- Born: 16 October 1963 (age 61); Brno, Czechoslovakia

Sport
- Sport: Gymnastics

Dana Brýdlová (born 16 October 1963) is a Czech gymnast. She competed in six events at the 1980 Summer Olympics.
