= Avelina Alvarez =

Portuguese gymnast (born 1961)

Personal information
- Nationality: Portuguese
- Born: 14 October 1961 (age 63)

Sport
- Sport: Gymnastics

Maria Avelina Alvarez (born 14 October 1961) is a Portuguese gymnast. She competed in five events at the 1980 Summer Olympics.
