= Kerry Bayliss =

Australian gymnast

Personal information
- Full name: Kerry Ann Bayliss
- Nationality: Australian
- Born: 19 June 1962 (age 62)

Sport
- Sport: Gymnastics

Kerry Ann Bayliss (born 19 June 1962), also known as Kerry Ann Lindsay, is an Australian former gymnast. She competed in five events at the 1980 Summer Olympics.
