= Lenke Almási =

Hungarian gymnast

Personal information
- Nationality: Hungarian
- Born: 22 March 1965 (age 60); Budapest, Hungary

Sport
- Sport: Gymnastics

Lenke Almási (born 22 March 1965) is a Hungarian retired gymnast. She competed in six events at the 1980 Summer Olympics.
