= Aurora Morata =

Spanish gymnast

Personal information
- Nationality: Spanish
- Born: 26 February 1961 (age 64) Vilanova i la Geltrú, Spain

Sport
- Sport: Gymnastics

Aurora Morata (born 26 February 1961) is a Spanish gymnast. She competed in five events at the 1980 Summer Olympics.
