= Dashzevgiin Ariunaa =

Mongolian gymnast (born 1965)

Personal information
- Nationality: Mongolian
- Born: 17 October 1965 (age 59)

Sport
- Sport: Gymnastics

Dashzevgiin Ariunaa (born 17 October 1965) is a Mongolian gymnast. She competed in five events at the 1980 Summer Olympics.
