= Regina Grabolle =

German gymnast

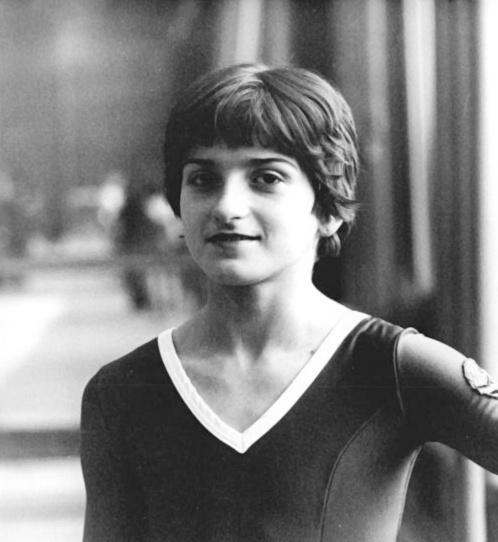
- Grabolle in 1980

Personal information
- Born: 18 May 1965 (age 61)

Gymnastics career
- Discipline: Women's artistic gymnastics
- Country represented: East Germany
- Club: SC Dynamo Berlin
Medal record
World Championships
Bronze medal – third place	1979 Fort Worth	Team
Bronze medal – third place	1979 Fort Worth	Balance Beam

Regina Grabolle (born 18 May 1965) is a retired German artistic gymnast. She won two bronze medals at the 1979 World Artistic Gymnastics Championships, on the balance beam and in the team competition.
