= Estela de la Torre =

Mexican gymnast (born 1965)

Personal information
- Full name: Estela de la Torre Borja
- Nationality: Mexican
- Born: 14 February 1965 (age 60)

Sport
- Sport: Gymnastics

Estela de la Torre Borja (born 14 February 1965) is a Mexican gymnast. She competed in five events at the 1980 Summer Olympics.
