= Erika Flander =

Hungarian gymnast

Personal information
- Nationality: Hungarian
- Born: 5 February 1965 (age 60); Budapest, Hungary

Sport
- Sport: Gymnastics

Erika Flander (born 5 February 1965) is a Hungarian gymnast. She competed in six events at the 1980 Summer Olympics.
