= Katarína Šarišská =

Czech gymnast

Personal information
- Nationality: Czech
- Born: 28 September 1965 (age 59); Znojmo, Czechoslovakia

Sport
- Sport: Gymnastics

Katarína Šarišská (born 28 September 1965) is a Czech gymnast. She competed in six events at the 1980 Summer Olympics.
