= Krassimira Toneva =

Bulgarian gymnast (born 1965)

- Красимира Тонева
- Born: 24 June 1965 (age 61)

Gymnastics career
- Discipline: Women's artistic gymnastics
- Country represented: Bulgaria

Krassimira Toneva, also spelled Krasimira, (Bulgarian: Красимира Тонева; born 24 June 1965) is a Bulgarian gymnast. She competed at the 1980 Summer Olympics and now works as a coach in the United States.

== Career ==
Toneva began gymnastics in 1972 or 1973 at around 6 years old.

She competed internationally as a senior gymnast for the first time at the 1978 World Championships. This was despite the fact that, having turned 13 years old that year, she was too young to compete there under the age requirements at the time, which stated that gymnasts had to turn 14 the year of competition. She finished 63rd in the all-around.

In 1979, she competed at the 1979 European Championships and placed 11th in the all-around, the best result for a Bulgarian gymnast until then. She also competed at the 1979 World Championships and qualified for the balance beam final, where she finished in 7th. In the all-around, she finished 17th.

While she was already competing at a senior, in 1980, she also competed at the Junior European championships, where she placed 18th. At the 1980 Summer Olympics, she placed 6th with the Bulgarian team and 16th in the all-around.

The next year, she finished 6th at the 1981 European Championships. She did not attend the World Championships that year, and it was mentioned in October that she was having health issues.

== Post-competitive career ==
Toneva works as a coach at a gym in Sarasota, Florida in the United States.
