= Anita Šauerová =

Czech gymnast

Personal information
- Nationality: Czech
- Born: 26 February 1963 (age 62); Brno, Czechoslovakia

Sport
- Country: Czechoslovakia
- Sport: Gymnastics

Anita Šauerová (born 26 February 1963) is a Czech gymnast. She competed for Czechoslovakia in six events at the 1980 Summer Olympics.
