= Radka Zemanová =

Czech gymnast

Personal information
- Nationality: Czech
- Born: 5 December 1963 (age 61); Ostrava, Czechoslovakia

Sport
- Sport: Gymnastics

Radka Zemanová (born 5 December 1963) is a Czech gymnast. She competed in six events at the 1980 Summer Olympics.
