= Leslie Pyfer =

American artistic gymnast

Leslie Pyfer (born c. 1963) is a former artistic gymnast. Pyfer won the USA Gymnastics National Championship in 1979. She competed for the United States at the 1978 and 1979 World Championships.
