= Birgit Süß =

East German artistic gymnast

Medal record

Women's gymnastics

Representing East Germany

Olympic Games
Bronze medal – third place	1980 Moscow	Team

Birgit Süß (born 29 March 1962 in Halle (Saale)) is a former German gymnast who competed in the 1980 Summer Olympics, winning a bronze medal.
