= Antoaneta Rakhneva =

Bulgarian gymnast (born 1962)

Personal information
- Nationality: Bulgarian
- Born: 4 October 1962 (age 62)

Sport
- Sport: Gymnastics

Antoaneta Rakhneva (Bulgarian: Антоанета Рахнева) (born 4 October 1962) is a Bulgarian gymnast. She competed in six events at the 1980 Summer Olympics.
