= Gloria Viseras =

Spanish gymnast

Personal information
- Nationality: Spanish
- Born: 9 February 1965 (age 60); Mexico City, Mexico

Sport
- Sport: Gymnastics

Gloria Viseras (born 9 February 1965) is a Spanish gymnast. She competed in five events at the 1980 Summer Olympics.
