= Dimitrinka Filipova =

Bulgarian gymnast (born 1966)

Personal information
- Nationality: Bulgarian
- Born: 7 May 1966 (age 58)

Sport
- Sport: Gymnastics

Dimitrinka Filipova (Bulgarian: Димитринка Филипова) (born 7 May 1966) is a Bulgarian gymnast. She competed in six events at the 1980 Summer Olympics.
