= Erzsébet Hanti =

Hungarian gymnast

Personal information
- Nationality: Hungarian
- Born: 21 October 1964 (age 60); Kecskemét, Hungary

Sport
- Sport: Gymnastics

Erzsébet Hanti (born 21 October 1964) is a Hungarian gymnast. She competed in six events at the 1980 Summer Olympics.
