= Yelena Naimushina =

Soviet gymnast (1964–2017)

Personal information
- Born: Yelena Arkadyevna Naimushina; 19 November 1964 Askiz, Krasnoyarsk Krai, Soviet Union
- Died: 14 March 2017 (aged 52)
- Height: 1.45 m (4 ft 9 in)
- Weight: 40 kg (88 lb)

Sport
- Sport: Artistic gymnastics
- Club: Dynamo Krasnoyarsk
Medal record
Representing the Soviet Union
Olympic Games
Gold medal – first place	1980 Moscow	Team
World championships
Silver medal – second place	1979 Fort Worth	Team

Yelena Arkadyevna Naimushina (Russian: Елена Аркадьевна Наимушина; 19 November 1964 – 14 March 2017) was a Soviet gymnast.

== Career ==
She competed at the 1980 Summer Olympics and won a gold medal with the Soviet team. She won a silver team medal at the 1979 World Artistic Gymnastics Championships.

Naimushina retired in 1981 and married Andris, a Latvian cyclist whom she met in 1980. For 15 years she lived in Latvia where she gave birth to sons Tom and Phillip and daughter Linda-Anna. They later divorced and Naimushina returned to Russia. Between 1990 and 1993 she performed in the sports show All Stars of Dynamo managed by Mikhail Voronin. She later married a second time, to gymnastics coach Sergey Grigoryev, and moved to Tula, Russia, where they trained children.

Naimushina died on March 14, 2017. Her former coach Valentin Shevchuk said the death was unexpected.
