= Eva Marečková =

Slovak gymnast (born 1964)

Personal information
- Nationality: Slovak
- Born: 18 May 1964 (age 60); Detva, Czechoslovakia

Sport
- Sport: Gymnastics

Eva Marečková (born 18 May 1964) is a Slovak gymnast. She competed in six events at the 1980 Summer Olympics.
