= Romi Kessler =

Swiss gymnast

Personal information
- Nationality: Swiss
- Born: 20 February 1963 (age 62)

Sport
- Sport: Gymnastics

Romi Kessler (born 20 February 1963) is a Swiss gymnast. She finished 9th in the individual all around at the 1984 Summer Olympics.
