= Katharina Rensch =

East German gymnast

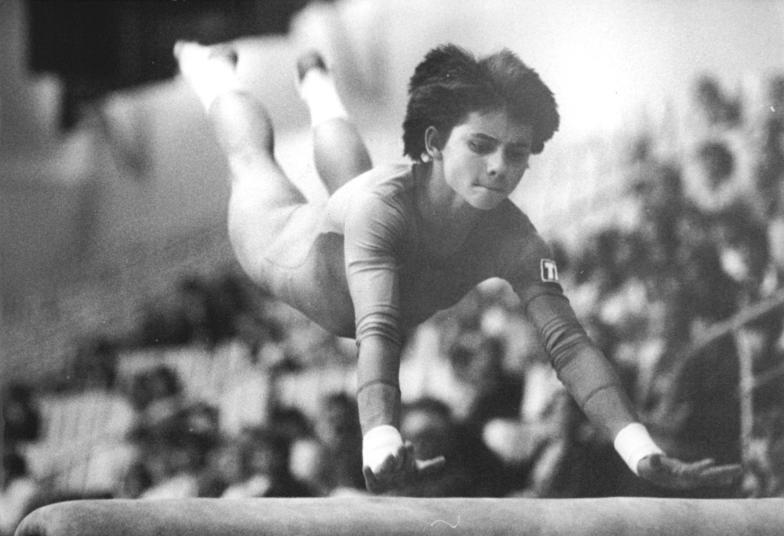
- Rensch in 1980

Personal information
- Born: 7 October 1964 (age 61) East Berlin, East Germany
- Height: 1.59 m (5 ft 3 in)

Gymnastics career
- Discipline: Women's artistic gymnastics
- Club: Berliner TSC
Medal record
Representing East Germany
Olympic Games
Bronze medal – third place	1980 Moscow	Team
World Championships
Bronze medal – third place	1979 Fort Worth	Team

Katharina Rensch (later Schirmer, born 7 October 1964) is a German retired gymnast. She competed at the 1980 Summer Olympics in all artistic gymnastics events, and won a bronze medal in the team competition. Her best individual result was sixth place in the vault. She won another bronze medal with the East German team at the 1979 World Artistic Gymnastics Championships.
