= Maria Filatova =

Soviet gymnast (born 1961)

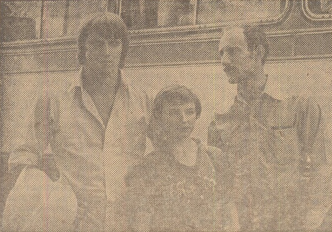
- Full name: Mariya Yevgenyevna Filatova
- Born: July 19, 1961 (age 65) Leninsk-Kuznetsky, Kemerovo Oblast, Russian SFSR, Soviet Union

Gymnastics career
- Discipline: Women's artistic gymnastics
- Country represented: Soviet Union (1974–1982)
- Retired: 1982
Medal record
Representing Soviet Union
Olympic Games
Gold medal – first place	1976 Montreal	Team
Gold medal – first place	1980 Moscow	Team
Bronze medal – third place	1980 Moscow	Uneven Bars
World Championships
Gold medal – first place	1978 Strasbourg	Team
Gold medal – first place	1981 Moscow	Team
Silver medal – second place	1979 Fort Worth	Team
Silver medal – second place	1981 Moscow	All-Around
World Cup Final
Gold medal – first place	1977 Oviedo	All-Around
Gold medal – first place	1977 Oviedo	Floor Exercise
Gold medal – first place	1978 Sao Paulo	All-Around
Gold medal – first place	1978 Sao Paulo	Floor Exercise
Silver medal – second place	1977 Oviedo	Vault
Silver medal – second place	1977 Oviedo	Uneven Bars
Silver medal – second place	1980 Toronto	Balance Beam
European Championships
Gold medal – first place	1977 Prague	Floor Exercise
Bronze medal – third place	1977 Prague	Balance Beam

Maria Evgenievna Filatova (Russian: Мария Евгеньевна Филатова) (born July 19, 1961) is a retired Russian gymnast who competed at the 1976 and 1980 Olympics.

== Career ==
Filatova began competing for the USSR junior team in 1974. In 1976 she placed fourth at the USSR National Championships and competed well in various international events.

Filatova was originally named as an alternate to the Soviet team at the 1976 Summer Olympics in Montreal. However, during podium training, she received such a positive reaction from the crowd that she was added to the team roster. She shared in the team gold medal and was ranked ninth overall after the team competition. Because four of her teammates scored higher than she did and only three gymnasts per team were allowed to compete in the all-around, she did not advance to the AA finals in spite of her high placement.

Following the Olympics and the retirements of several high-profile gymnasts, including Ludmilla Tourischeva and Olga Korbut, Filatova emerged as one of the leaders of the Soviet team. She won the World Cup in 1977 and 1978; the USSR Nationals in 1977, and the Riga International meet in 1977 and 1979. At the 1980 Olympics, Filatova served as the lead-off gymnast on several events and contributed to the team's gold medal. She continued to the 1981 World Championships, where she was the silver medalist in the all-around.

British journalist David Hunn referred to Filatova as a "fifteen-year-old in the Korbut tradition." As Korbut, Filatova was known for her enthusiastic, expressive floor exercise routines and her difficult acrobatic skills. She was one of the first female gymnasts to successfully compete a double back somersault on floor in 1975.

== Post-gymnastics career ==
After retiring from competition, Milatova worked as a circus performer, where she met and married tumbler Alexander Kourbatov. They moved to Leninsk-Kuznetsky, where she had a daughter. In 1984, she visited her former coach, who asked her to choreograph floor routines for her students. She continued to choreograph routines, and in 1988, she officially began coaching at her former gym as a choreographer.

She moved to the United States and coached before returning to Russia. She was inducted into the International Gymnastics Hall of Fame in 2019.

== Achievements (non-Olympic) ==
Year	Event	AA	Team	VT	UB	BB	FX
1976	USSR Championships					3rd	
1977	World Cup	1st		2nd	2nd		1st
1977	European Championships					3rd	1st
1977	USSR Championships	1st				1st	2nd
1978	World Cup	1st					1st
1978	World Championships		1st				
1978	USSR Championships					1st	1st
1978	USSR Cup	1st					
1979	World Championships		2nd				
1979	Universiade	2nd	1st	1st	1st		1st
1979	USSR Championships	2nd				2nd	
1980	World Cup					2nd	
1981	World Championships	2nd	1st				
1981	Universiade		2nd				
