= Lena Adomat =

Swedish gymnast

Personal information
- Full name: Lena Annika Adomat
- Nationality: Swedish
- Born: 22 June 1964 (age 60); Västerås, Sweden
- Height: 1.62 m (5 ft 4 in)
- Weight: 56 kg (123 lb)

Sport
- Sport: Gymnastics

Lena Annika Adomat (born 22 June 1964) is a Swedish gymnast. She competed in the 1980 and 1984 Summer Olympics.
