= Dumitrița Turner =

Romanian gymnast (born 1964)

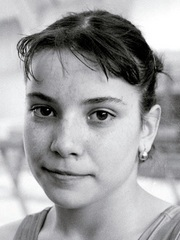

Personal information
- Born: 12 February 1964 (age 62) Onești, Romania
- Height: 159 cm (5 ft 3 in)

Gymnastics career
- Discipline: Women's artistic gymnastics
- Country represented: Romania
- Head coach: Béla Károlyi
- Assistant coach: Marta Károlyi
- Former coaches: Florica and Florin Dobre
Medal record
Olympic Games
Silver medal – second place	1980 Moscow	Team
World Championships
Gold medal – first place	1979 Fort Worth	Team
Gold medal – first place	1979 Fort Worth	Vault

Dumitrița Turner (born 12 February 1964) is a retired Romanian artistic gymnast who won a team silver medal at the 1980 Olympics. She also won a team and an individual gold medal at the 1979 World Championships. After retiring from competition she worked as a coach, first in Onești in Romania, in 1994 in Guatemala, and later in Australia.
