= Silvia Hindorff =

German gymnast

- Born: 27 June 1961 (age 65) Sebnitz, East Germany

Gymnastics career
- Discipline: Women's artistic gymnastics
- Country represented: East Germany
Medal record
Representing East Germany
Olympic Games
| Bronze medal – third place | 1980 Moscow | Team |
World Championships
| Bronze medal – third place | 1978 Strasbourg | Team |
| Bronze medal – third place | 1979 Fort Worth | Team |

Silvia Hindorff (later Hafemeister), born 27 June 1961 in Sebnitz, German Democratic Republic (the former East Germany) is a German former gymnast who competed at the 1978 and 1979 World Gymnastics Championships and the 1980 Summer Olympics. She is the 1980 East German National bronze medalist on floor exercise.

== Eponymous skill ==
Hindorff invented a release move on the uneven bars (free hip to straddle reverse Hecht) that bears her name in the Code of Points.

| Apparatus | Name | Description | Difficulty (Note: Valid for the 2025-2028 Code of Points) |
|---|---|---|---|
| Uneven bars | Hindorff | Clear hip circle on high bar counter straddle to hang on high bar | E |
