= Éva Óvári =

Hungarian gymnast

Personal information
- Nationality: Hungarian
- Born: 28 April 1962 (age 62); Dunaújváros, Hungary
- Height: 154 cm (5 ft 1 in)
- Weight: 39 kg (86 lb)

Sport
- Sport: Gymnastics

Éva Óvári (born 28 April 1962) is a Hungarian gymnast. She competed at the 1976 Summer Olympics and the 1980 Summer Olympics.
