= Łucja Matraszek-Chydzińska =

Polish gymnast (born 1954)

Personal information
- Nationality: Polish
- Born: 4 May 1954 (age 71) Warsaw, Poland

Sport
- Sport: Gymnastics

Łucja Matraszek-Chydzińska (born 4 May 1954) is a Polish gymnast. She competed at the 1972 Summer Olympics and the 1980 Summer Olympics.
