= Karola Sube =

East German artistic gymnast

Medal record

Women's gymnastics

Representing East Germany

Olympic Games
Bronze medal – third place	1980 Moscow	Team

Karola Sube (later Ziesche, born 28 April 1964 in Berlin) is a German gymnast and competed for the SC Dynamo Berlin / Sportvereinigung (SV) Dynamo. She won medals at international competitions.
