= Gymnastics at the 1980 Summer Olympics =

Gymnastics at the Games of the XXII Olympiad
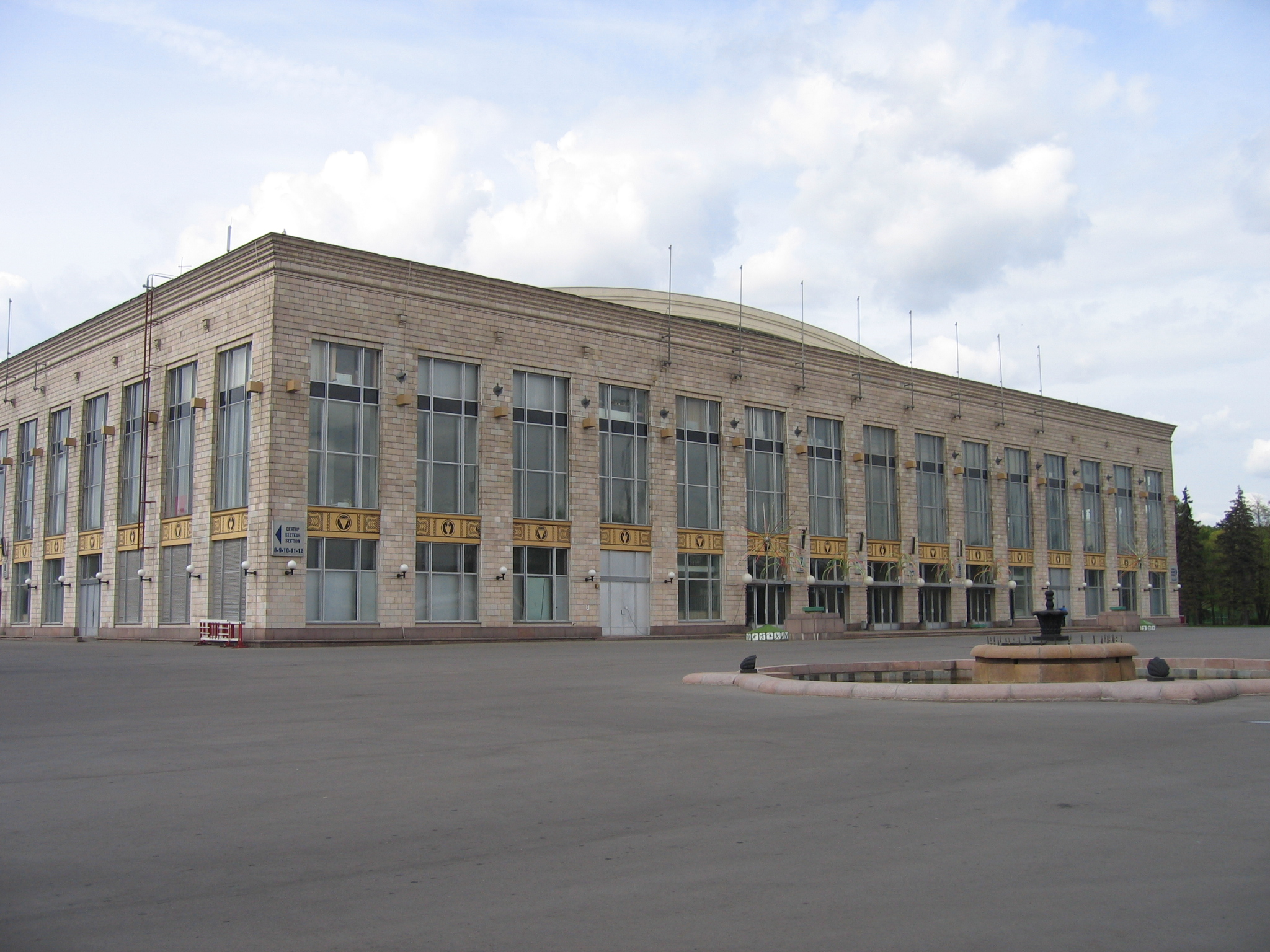
- Palace of Sports of the Central Lenin Stadium as it appears today
- Venue: Palace of Sports
- Dates: 20 July – 25 July 1980
- No. of events: 14
- Competitors: 127 (65 men, 62 women from 18 nations

At the 1980 Summer Olympics, fourteen different artistic gymnastics events were contested, eight for men and six for women. All events were held at the Sports Palace of the Central Lenin Stadium in Moscow from July 20 through 25th. Several teams who had qualified to compete were absent as a result of the 1980 Summer Olympics boycott, including the United States, Canada, China, Japan, South Korea, and West Germany.

For the first time in Olympic competition, in event finals for the vault an average of two vaults was used as the final score, rather than the best of two vaults.

== Format of competition ==
The gymnastics competition at the 1980 Summer Olympics was carried out in three stages:

- Competition I - The team competition/qualification round in which all gymnasts, including those who were not part of a team, performed both compulsory and optional exercises. The combined scores of all team members determined the final score of the team. The thirty-six highest scoring gymnasts in the all-around qualified to the individual all-around competition. The six highest scoring gymnasts on each apparatus qualified to the final for that apparatus.
- Competition II - The individual all-around competition, in which those who qualified from Competition I performed exercises on each apparatus. The final score of each gymnast was composed of half the points earned by that gymnast during Competition I and all of the points earned by him or her in Competition II.
- Competition III - The apparatus finals, in which those who qualified during Competition I performed an exercise on the individual apparatus on which he or she had qualified. The final score of each gymnast was composed of half the points earned by that gymnast on that particular apparatus during Competition I and all of the points earned by him or her on that particular apparatus in Competition III.

Each country was limited to three gymnasts in the all-around final and two gymnasts in each apparatus final.

== Medal summary ==
=== Men's events ===
Games	Gold	Silver	Bronze
Team all-around	Soviet Union; Nikolai Andrianov; Eduard Azaryan; Alexander Dityatin; Bogdan Makuts; Vladimir Markelov; Aleksandr Tkachyov	East Germany; Ralf-Peter Hemmann; Lutz Hoffmann; Lutz Mack; Michael Nikolay; Andreas Bronst; Roland Brückner	Hungary; Ferenc Donáth; György Guczoghy; Zoltán Kelemen; Péter Kovács; Zoltán Magyar; István Vámos
Individual all-around	Alexander Dityatin; Soviet Union	Nikolai Andrianov; Soviet Union	Stoyan Deltchev; Bulgaria
Floor exercise	Roland Brückner; East Germany	Nikolai Andrianov; Soviet Union	Alexander Dityatin; Soviet Union
Pommel horse	Zoltán Magyar; Hungary	Alexander Dityatin; Soviet Union	Michael Nikolay; East Germany
Rings	Alexander Dityatin; Soviet Union	Aleksandr Tkachyov; Soviet Union	Jiri Tabak; Czechoslovakia
Vault	Nikolai Andrianov; Soviet Union	Alexander Dityatin; Soviet Union	Roland Brückner; East Germany
Parallel bars	Aleksandr Tkachyov; Soviet Union	Alexander Dityatin; Soviet Union	Roland Brückner; East Germany
Horizontal bar	Stoyan Deltchev; Bulgaria	Alexander Dityatin; Soviet Union	Nikolai Andrianov; Soviet Union

=== Women's events ===
Games	Gold	Silver	Bronze
Team all-around	Soviet Union; Elena Davydova; Maria Filatova; Nellie Kim; Yelena Naimushina; Natalia Shaposhnikova; Stella Zakharova	Romania; Nadia Comăneci; Rodica Dunca; Emilia Eberle; Cristina Elena Grigoraș; Melita Ruhn; Dumitrița Turner	East Germany; Maxi Gnauck; Silvia Hindorff; Steffi Kräker; Katharina Rensch; Karola Sube; Birgit Süss
Individual all-around	Elena Davydova; Soviet Union	Maxi Gnauck; East Germany Nadia Comăneci; Romania	None awarded
Vault	Natalia Shaposhnikova; Soviet Union	Steffi Kräker; East Germany	Melita Ruhn; Romania
Uneven bars	Maxi Gnauck; East Germany	Emilia Eberle; Romania	Steffi Kräker; East Germany Melita Ruhn; Romania Maria Filatova; Soviet Union
Balance beam	Nadia Comăneci; Romania	Elena Davydova; Soviet Union	Natalia Shaposhnikova; Soviet Union
Floor exercise	Nellie Kim; Soviet Union Nadia Comăneci; Romania	None awarded	Natalia Shaposhnikova; Soviet Union Maxi Gnauck; East Germany

== Medal table ==
Rank	Nation	Gold	Silver	Bronze	Total
1	Soviet Union	9	8	5	22
2	East Germany	2	3	6	11
3	Romania	2	3	2	7
4	Bulgaria	1	0	1	2
4	Hungary	1	0	1	2
6	Czechoslovakia	0	0	1	1
Totals (6 entries)		15	14	16	45

== See also ==
- Olympic medalists in gymnastics (men)
- Olympic medalists in gymnastics (women)
- 1979 World Artistic Gymnastics Championships
