= Artistic Gymnastics World Cup – Women's uneven bars =

Women's events at the Artistic Gymnastics World Cup were first held at the 1975 FIG Artistic Gymnastics World Cup.

Three medals are awarded: gold for first place, silver for second place, and bronze for third place. Tie breakers have not been used in every year. In the event of a tie between two gymnasts, both names are listed, and the following position (second for a tie for first, third for a tie for second) is left empty because a medal was not awarded for that position. If three gymnastics tied for a position, the following two positions are left empty.

== Medalists ==
Year	Location	Gold	Silver	Bronze
1975	(United Kingdom) London	(Soviet Union) Ludmilla Tourischeva	(Soviet Union) Lidia Gorbik	(Soviet Union) Elvira Saadi
1977	(Spain) Oviedo	(Soviet Union) Elena Mukhina	(Soviet Union) Maria Filatova	(East Germany) Steffi Kräker
1978	(Brazil) São Paulo	(East Germany) Steffi Kräker	(Czechoslovakia) Vera Cerna	(United States) Rhonda Schwandt
1979	(Japan) Tokyo	(East Germany) Steffi Kräker (Romania) Emilia Eberle	-	(Soviet Union) Stella Zakharova (Czechoslovakia) Vera Cerna (Hungary) Zsuzsa Kalmar
1980	(Canada) Toronto	(East Germany) Maxi Gnauck	(East Germany) Steffi Kräker	(China) Zhu Zheng
1982	(Socialist Federal Republic of Yugoslavia) Zagreb	(East Germany) Maxi Gnauck	(Soviet Union) Natalia Yurchenko (Soviet Union) Olga Bicherova	-
1986	(China) Beijing	(Soviet Union) Elena Shushunova	(Soviet Union) Oksana Omelianchik	(Romania) Daniela Silivaş
1990	(Belgium) Brussels	(Soviet Union) Tatiana Lysenko	(Romania) Mirela Pasca	(Hungary) Henrietta Ónodi
1998	(Japan) Sabae	(China) Bi Wenjing	(Russia) Svetlana Khorkina	(China) Liu Xuan
2000	(United Kingdom) Glasgow	(China) Ling Jie	(Australia) Allana Slater	(Romania) Andreea Răducan
2002	(Germany) Stuttgart	(Romania) Oana Petrovschi	(Australia) Jacqui Dunn	(Netherlands) Verona van de Leur
2004	(United Kingdom) Birmingham	(United States) Chellsie Memmel	(United Kingdom) Beth Tweddle	(China) Li Ya
2006	(Brazil) São Paulo	(United Kingdom) Beth Tweddle	(China) Li Ya	(Ukraine) Dariya Zgoba
2008	(Spain) Madrid	(China) He Kexin	(China) Jiang Yuyuan	(Japan) Koko Tsurumi
