= Artistic Gymnastics World Cup – Women's vault =

Women's events at the Artistic Gymnastics World Cup were first held at the 1975 FIG Artistic Gymnastics World Cup.

Three medals are awarded: gold for first place, silver for second place, and bronze for third place. Tie breakers have not been used in every year. In the event of a tie between two gymnasts, both names are listed, and the following position (second for a tie for first, third for a tie for second) is left empty because a medal was not awarded for that position. If three gymnasts tied for a position, the following two positions are left empty.

== Medalists ==
Year	Location	Gold	Silver	Bronze
1975	(United Kingdom) London	(Soviet Union) Ludmilla Tourischeva	(Soviet Union) Elvira Saadi (Soviet Union) Olga Koval	-
1977	(Spain) Oviedo	(Soviet Union) Natalia Shaposhnikova	(Soviet Union) Maria Filatova	(Hungary) Márta Egervári
1978	(Brazil) São Paulo	(Soviet Union) Natalia Shaposhnikova	(United States) Rhonda Schwandt	(East Germany) Steffi Kräker
1979	(Japan) Tokyo	(Romania) Nadia Comăneci	(Soviet Union) Stella Zakharova	(Soviet Union) Nellie Kim
1980	(Canada) Toronto	(Soviet Union) Stella Zakharova	(Czechoslovakia) Jana Labakova	(Romania) Cristina Grigoraș (Canada) Elfi Schlegel
1982	(Socialist Federal Republic of Yugoslavia) Zagreb	(Soviet Union) Natalia Yurchenko (Soviet Union) Olga Bicherova	-	(United States) Julianne McNamara
1986	(China) Beijing	(Soviet Union) Elena Shushunova	(Soviet Union) Oksana Omelianchik	(Romania) Ecaterina Szabo
1990	(Belgium) Brussels	(Hungary) Henrietta Ónodi	(Spain) Eva Rueda	(Soviet Union) Svetlana Boguinskaya
1998	(Japan) Sabae	(Romania) Simona Amânar	(Romania) Gina Gogean	(China) Kui Yuanyuan
2000	(United Kingdom) Glasgow	(Russia) Elena Zamolodchikova	(Romania) Simona Amânar	(Poland) Joanna Skowrońska
2002	(Germany) Stuttgart	(Russia) Elena Zamolodchikova (Uzbekistan) Oksana Chusovitina	-	(Netherlands) Verona van de Leur
2004	(United Kingdom) Birmingham	(United States) Alicia Sacramone	(Romania) Monica Roșu	(Russia) Anna Pavlova
2006	(Brazil) São Paulo	(China) Cheng Fei	(Brazil) Laís Souza	(Russia) Elena Zamolodchikova
2008	(Spain) Madrid	(China) Cheng Fei	(Switzerland) Ariella Kaeslin	(Belgium) Aagje Vanwalleghem
