= FIG World Cup =

Gymnastic championship

FIG World Cup refers to a number of events organized by the International Gymnastics Federation (FIG) across seven competitive gymnastics disciplines: 1) acrobatic gymnastics, 2) aerobic gymnastics, 3) men's artistic gymnastics, 4) women's artistic gymnastics, 5) women's rhythmic gymnastics, 6) trampoline and tumbling, and 7) parkour.

== History ==
The FIG hosted the first Artistic Gymnastics World Cup on an international scale in 1975. This event was an original competition reserved for the best gymnasts, bringing together competitors in all-around competition and in apparatus finals. This initiative was taken in a particular context, since the World Artistic Gymnastics Championships took place every four years. In 1983, FIG decided to hold a Rhythmic Gymnastics World Cup for the first time, after six editions of the Artistic Gymnastics World Cup. At the time, the World Rhythmic Gymnastics Championships were also held every four years. The World Cup events were upheld only until 1990, since FIG decided to host the Artistic and Rhythmic Gymnastics World Championships every year starting in 1991. Acrobatic gymnastics, a discipline not recognized by the International Gymnastics Federation prior to 1999, had World Cup events held from 1975 to 1993, organized by the International Federation of Sports Acrobatics (IFSA). Similarly, trampoline and tumbling World Cup events were organized from 1993 to 1997 by the Fédération Internationale de Trampoline (FIT). FIG later recognized IFSA and FIT World Cup events as official FIG World Cup competitions.

In 1997, the World Cup was revived as a series of qualifying events for a period of two years, culminating in a final event that was known as the World Cup Final. The different stages, known as World Cup qualifiers, mostly served the purpose of awarding points to gymnasts according to their placements. These points would be added up over the two-year period to qualify a limited number of gymnasts to the biennial World Cup Final event. In 2001, FIG hosted the World Series for aerobic gymnastics for the first time, equivalent to the World Cup format. FIG introduced the first World Cup series in acrobatic gymnastics in 2003. Both aerobic and acrobatic World Cup series were also competed in a two-year period, with a World Cup Final (or World Series Final) event closing the calendar. The World Cup Final format lasted for these disciplines until 2007. In 2008, the World Cup Final format was terminated for the other disciplines: artistic, rhythmic, trampoline and tumbling.

Beginning in 2009, the World Cup series changed focus from a biennial series to a yearly series with no culminating final event. In each of the stages, medals are awarded to the top three gymnasts or groups in each event, as well as prize money. In 2018, parkour was recognized as a discipline by FIG, and World Cup stages were held for the first time in collaboration with the Festival International des Sports Extrêmes (FISE). The 2019 and 2020 World Cup series in artistic gymnastics, rhythmic gymnastics and trampoline will be part of the qualification process to the 2020 Tokyo Olympics, a first in the World Cup series.

== World Cup series ==
=== Artistic gymnastics ===
Since 1997, the Artistic Gymnastics World Cup has been contested as a series of stages in different cities around the world. From 2003 to 2010, events at the Artistic Gymnastics World Cup series were divided into Category A and Category B; Category A events were reserved for invited athletes only, while Category B events were open to all athletes. In 2011, the individual apparatus competitions were renamed World Challenge Cups while the all-around competitions retained the World Cup name. Currently, the World Cup series is divided into three groups: 1) All-Around World Cup series, 2) World Challenge Cup series, and 3) World Cup series, where gymnasts compete in individual apparatus. All of the World Challenge Cup competitions remain open to every gymnast, while All-Around World Cup competitions are by invitation only, according to the results of the previous World Championships or Olympic Games.

=== Rhythmic gymnastics ===
Since 1999, the Rhythmic Gymnastics World Cup has been competed as a series of events held in different countries. From 2003 to 2016, events at the Rhythmic Gymnastics World Cup series were divided into Category A and Category B; Category A events were reserved for invited athletes, while Category B events were open to all athletes. Since 2017, the World Cup series is divided in: 1) the World Cup series; and 2) the World Challenge Cup series. All of the World Cup and World Challenge Cup events are open to all athletes, and all of the events feature both all-around and apparatus competitions.

The Rhythmic Gymnastics World Cup should not be confused with the Rhythmic Gymnastics Grand Prix series, which is neither officially organized nor promoted by FIG.

=== Other disciplines ===
As of 2018, series of World Cup events are held yearly in acrobatic gymnastics, aerobic gymnastics, trampoline and tumbling, as well as parkour. All events are organized and sanctioned by FIG.

Acrobatic gymnastics, a discipline not recognized by the International Gymnastics Federation prior to 1999, had World Cup events held from 1975 to 1993, organized by the International Federation of Sports Acrobatics (IFSA). Similarly, trampoline and tumbling World Cup events were organized from 1993 to 1997 by the Fédération Internationale de Trampoline (FIT). FIG later recognized IFSA and FIT World Cup events as official FIG World Cup competitions. The World Cup Final format lasted for these disciplines until 2007. In 2008, the World Cup Final format was terminated for the other disciplines: artistic, rhythmic, trampoline and tumbling. In 2018, parkour was recognized as a discipline by FIG, and World Cup stages were held for the first time in collaboration with the Festival International des Sports Extrêmes (FISE).

== FIG World Cup Final ==
The World Cup Finals were held as the final event of the World Cup circuit for each of the disciplines in gymnastics until 2008. The International Gymnastics Federation officially recognizes only a number of events as World Cup Final events, as shown below.

Year	Acrobatic		Aerobic		Artistic		Rhythmic		Trampoline	
Year	Event	Host	Event	Host	Event	Host	Event	Host	Event	Host
1975	1st IFSA World Cup	(Switzerland) SUI			1st World Cup Final	(United Kingdom) GBR				
1977	2nd IFSA World Cup	(Poland) POL			2nd World Cup Final	(Spain) ESP				
1978					3rd World Cup Final	(Brazil) BRA				
1979					4th World Cup Final	(Japan) JPN				
1980					5th World Cup Final	(Canada) CAN				
1981	3rd IFSA World Cup	(Switzerland) SUI								
1982					6th World Cup Final	(Socialist Federal Republic of Yugoslavia) YUG				
1983	4th IFSA World Cup	(United States) USA					1st World Cup Final	(Socialist Federal Republic of Yugoslavia) YUG		
1985	5th IFSA World Cup	(China) CHN								
1986					7th World Cup Final	(China) CHN	2nd World Cup Final	(Japan) JPN		
1987	6th IFSA World Cup	(United States) USA								
1989	7th IFSA World Cup	(Soviet Union) URS								
1990					8th World Cup Final	(Belgium) BEL	3rd World Cup Final	(Belgium) BEL		
1991	8th IFSA World Cup	(Japan) JPN								
1993	9th IFSA World Cup	(Bulgaria) BUL							1st World Cup (FIT)	(Germany) GER
1995									2nd World Cup (FIT)	(Denmark) DEN
1997									3rd World Cup (FIT)	(Germany) GER
1998					9th World Cup Final	(Japan) JPN				
1999									4th World Cup (FIG)	(Portugal) POR
2000					10th World Cup Final	(United Kingdom) GBR	4th World Cup Final	(United Kingdom) GBR	5th World Cup (FIG)	(Germany) GER
2001			1st World Series Final	(Italy) ITA						
2002					11th World Cup Final	(Germany) GER	5th World Cup Final	(Germany) GER	6th World Cup (FIG)	(Germany) GER
2003	1st FIG World Cup Final	(Russia) RUS	2nd World Series Final	(Russia) RUS						
2004					12th World Cup Final	(United Kingdom) GBR	6th World Cup Final	(Russia) RUS	7th World Cup (FIG)	(Algeria) ALG
2006					13th World Cup Final	(Brazil) BRA	7th World Cup Final	(Japan) JPN	8th World Cup (FIG)	(United Kingdom) GBR
2007	2nd FIG World Cup Final	(Belgium) BEL	3rd World Series Final	(France) FRA						
2008					14th World Cup Final	(Spain) ESP	8th World Cup Final	(Spain) ESP	9th World Cup (FIG)	(Russia) RUS

== Successful nations ==
What follows are lists of nations which have earned at least one medal at one of the stages of the FIG World Cup circuit, divided by discipline. The events are sometimes referred to as World Series, World Cup or World Challenge Cup, depending on the format and the discipline contested. Only senior events were considered for the making of the lists.

=== Acrobatic gymnastics ===
Results accounted for include: 1) the different editions of the IFSA World Cup from 1975 to 1993; and 2) the different stages of the FIG World Series and FIG World Cup series.

- Australia
- Azerbaijan
- Belarus
- Belgium
- Bulgaria
- China
- France
- Georgia
- Germany
- Great Britain
- Hungary
- India
- Israel
- Kazakhstan
- Netherlands
- North Korea
- Poland
- Portugal
- Puerto Rico
- Russia
- Soviet Union
- Spain
- Switzerland
- Ukraine
- United States
- West Germany

=== Aerobic gymnastics ===
Results accounted for include the different stages of the FIG World Series and FIG World Cup series.

- Argentina
- Australia
- Austria
- Azerbaijan
- Brazil
- Bulgaria
- Chile
- China
- Chinese Taipei
- Czech Republic
- Finland
- France
- Germany
- Great Britain
- Greece
- Hungary
- Iceland
- Indonesia
- Italy
- Japan
- Mexico
- New Zealand
- Portugal
- Romania
- Russia
- Slovakia
- South Korea
- Spain
- Sweden
- Thailand
- Turkey
- Ukraine
- Vietnam

=== Artistic gymnastics ===
Results accounted for include the different stages of the FIG World Cup series and the FIG World Challenge Cup series.

- Albania
- Algeria
- Argentina
- Armenia
- Australia
- Austria
- Azerbaijan
- Belarus
- Belgium
- Brazil
- Bulgaria
- Canada
- Chile
- China
- Chinese Taipei
- Colombia
- Croatia
- Cuba
- Cyprus
- Czech Republic
- Czechoslovakia
- Denmark
- Dominican Republic
- East Germany
- Egypt
- Finland
- France
- Georgia
- Germany
- Great Britain
- Greece
- Guatemala
- Hong Kong
- Hungary
- Iceland
- India
- Indonesia
- Iran
- Ireland
- Israel
- Italy
- Japan
- Jordan
- Kazakhstan
- Latvia
- Lithuania
- Luxembourg
- Malaysia
- Mexico
- Mongolia
- Morocco
- Netherlands
- New Zealand
- North Korea
- Norway
- Panama
- Peru
- Philippines
- Poland
- Portugal
- Puerto Rico
- Romania
- Russia
- Serbia
- Slovakia
- Slovenia
- South Africa
- South Korea
- Soviet Union
- Spain
- Sweden
- Switzerland
- Syria
- Tunisia
- Turkey
- Ukraine
- United States
- Uzbekistan
- Venezuela
- Vietnam
- West Germany

=== Parkour ===
Results accounted for include the different stages of the FIG World Cup circuit, started in 2018 in collaboration with the Festival International des Sports Extrêmes (FISE).

- Australia
- Belgium
- China
- Czech Republic
- France
- Germany
- Great Britain
- Greece
- Japan
- Latvia
- Mexico
- Netherlands
- Poland
- Russia
- Spain
- Switzerland
- Ukraine

=== Rhythmic gymnastics ===
Results accounted for include the different stages of the FIG World Cup series and the FIG World Challenge Cup series.

- Argentina
- Azerbaijan
- Belarus
- Brazil
- Bulgaria
- Canada
- China
- Cyprus
- Estonia
- Finland
- France
- Georgia
- Germany
- Greece
- Hungary
- Israel
- Italy
- Japan
- Kazakhstan
- Latvia
- Mexico
- North Korea
- Poland
- Romania
- Russia
- Slovenia
- South Korea
- Soviet Union
- Spain
- Switzerland
- Ukraine
- United States
- Uzbekistan

=== Trampoline and tumbling gymnastics ===
Results accounted for include: 1) the different editions of the FIT World Cup from 1984 to 1998; and 2) the different stages of the FIG World Series and FIG World Cup series.

- Australia
- Azerbaijan
- Belarus
- Belgium
- Brazil
- Canada
- China
- Czech Republic
- Denmark
- France
- Georgia
- Germany
- Great Britain
- Greece
- Italy
- Japan
- Kazakhstan
- Latvia
- Netherlands
- New Zealand
- Poland
- Portugal
- Russia
- South Africa
- Soviet Union
- Spain
- Sweden
- Switzerland
- Turkey
- Ukraine
- United States
- Uzbekistan
- West Germany

== See also ==
- Four Continents Gymnastics Championships
- Major achievements in gymnastics by nation
- Rhythmic Gymnastics Grand Prix
