= Artistic Gymnastics World Cup – Women's floor =

Women's events at the Artistic Gymnastics World Cup were first held at the 1975 FIG Artistic Gymnastics World Cup.

Three medals are awarded: gold for first place, silver for second place, and bronze for third place. Tie breakers have not been used in every year. In the event of a tie between two gymnasts, both names are listed, and the following position (second for a tie for first, third for a tie for second) is left empty because a medal was not awarded for that position. If three gymnastics tied for a position, the following two positions are left empty.

== Medalists ==
Year	Location	Gold	Silver	Bronze
1975	(United Kingdom) London	(Soviet Union) Ludmilla Tourischeva	(Romania) Teodora Ungureanu (Soviet Union) Elvira Saadi	-
1977	(Spain) Oviedo	(Soviet Union) Maria Filatova	(Czechoslovakia) Vera Cerna (East Germany) Steffi Kräker	-
1978	(Brazil) São Paulo	(Soviet Union) Maria Filatova	(Soviet Union) Natalia Shaposhnikova	(United States) Kathy Johnson
1979	(Japan) Tokyo	(Romania) Nadia Comăneci	(Soviet Union) Stella Zakharova	(Romania) Emilia Eberle
1980	(Canada) Toronto	(East Germany) Maxi Gnauck	(Soviet Union) Elena Naimushina (Soviet Union) Stella Zakharova	-
1982	(Socialist Federal Republic of Yugoslavia) Zagreb	(Soviet Union) Olga Bicherova	(Romania) Lavinia Agache	(East Germany) Maxi Gnauck
1986	(China) Beijing	(Soviet Union) Elena Shushunova	(Romania) Camelia Voinea	(Soviet Union) Oksana Omelianchik
1990	(Belgium) Brussels	(Soviet Union) Svetlana Boguinskaya	(Hungary) Henrietta Ónodi	(Soviet Union) Tatiana Lysenko (Romania) Mirela Pasca
1998	(Japan) Sabae	(Romania) Simona Amânar	(Romania) Gina Gogean	(Belarus) Alena Polozkova
2000	(United Kingdom) Glasgow	(Romania) Andreea Răducan	(Russia) Elena Zamolodchikova	(China) Dong Fangxiao (Romania) Simona Amânar
2002	(Germany) Stuttgart	(Netherlands) Verona van de Leur	(China) Zhang Nan	(Australia) Allana Slater
2004	(United Kingdom) Birmingham	(Brazil) Daiane dos Santos	(Romania) Cătălina Ponor	(China) Cheng Fei
2006	(Brazil) São Paulo	(Brazil) Daiane dos Santos	(United Kingdom) Beth Tweddle	(Brazil) Laís Souza
2008	(Spain) Madrid	(China) Cheng Fei	(China) Jiang Yuyuan	(Romania) Sandra Izbașa
