= 1978 World Artistic Gymnastics Championships =

Gymnastics competition

- Location: Strasbourg, France

The 19th Artistic Gymnastics World Championships were held in Strasbourg, France, in 1978 from October 23 to October 29.

This was the first world championships to make use of video replays. A video control system was installed near each apparatus to help judges in disputable situations. The system had first been used at the 1977 European Championships.

For the first time eight gymnasts were allowed to qualify to each of the apparatus finals, rather than six. This became the standard going forward.

== Results ==
Event	Gold	Silver	Bronze
Men
Team all-around	Japan; Hiroshi Kajiyama; Shigeru Kasamatsu; Eizo Kenmotsu; Junichi Shimizu; Shinzo Shiraishi; Mitsuo Tsukahara	Soviet Union; Nikolai Andrianov; Eduard Azarian; Alexander Dityatin; Gennady Krysin; Vladimir Markelov; Aleksandr Tkachyov	East Germany; Ralph Bärthel; Roland Brückner; Ralf-Peter Hemmann; Lutz Mack; Michael Nikolay; Reinhard Rückriem
Individual all-around	(Soviet Union) Nikolai Andrianov	(Japan) Eizo Kenmotsu	(Soviet Union) Alexander Dityatin
Floor	(United States) Kurt Thomas	(Japan) Shigeru Kasamatsu	(Soviet Union) Alexander Dityatin
Pommel horse	(Hungary) Zoltán Magyar	(West Germany) Eberhard Gienger	(Bulgaria) Stoyan Deltchev
Rings	(Soviet Union) Nikolai Andrianov	(Soviet Union) Alexander Dityatin	(Romania) Dănuț Grecu
Vault	(Japan) Junichi Shimizu	(Soviet Union) Nikolai Andrianov	(East Germany) Ralph Bärthel
Parallel bars	(Japan) Eizo Kenmotsu	(Japan) Hiroshi Kajiyama (Soviet Union) Nikolai Andrianov	none awarded
Horizontal bar	(Japan) Shigeru Kasamatsu	(West Germany) Eberhard Gienger	(Bulgaria) Stoyan Deltchev (Soviet Union) Gennady Krysin
Women
Team all-around	Soviet Union; Maria Filatova; Natalia Shaposhnikova; Elena Mukhina; Nellie Kim; Svetlana Agapova; Tatiana Arzhannikova	(Romania) Romania; Nadia Comăneci; Emilia Eberle; Marilena Neacsu; Teodora Ungureanu; Anca Grigoraș; Marilena Vlădărău	East Germany; Steffi Kräker; Silvia Hindorff; Birgit Süß; Heike Kuhardt; Karola Sube; Ute Wittwer
Individual all-around	(Soviet Union) Elena Mukhina	(Soviet Union) Nellie Kim	(Soviet Union) Natalia Shaposhnikova
Vault	(Soviet Union) Nellie Kim	(Romania) Nadia Comaneci	(East Germany) Steffi Kräker
Uneven bars	(United States) Marcia Frederick	(Soviet Union) Elena Mukhina	(Romania) Emilia Eberle
Balance beam	(Romania) Nadia Comăneci	(Soviet Union) Elena Mukhina	(Romania) Emilia Eberle
Floor	(Soviet Union) Nellie Kim (Soviet Union) Elena Mukhina	none awarded	(Romania) Emilia Eberle (United States) Kathy Johnson

- NB: Team rosters are incomplete.

Kurt Thomas and Marica Frederick's gold medals were the first at world championship level for the American men and women.

== Men ==
=== Team final ===
1st	Japan	579.850
2nd	Soviet Union	578.950
3rd	East Germany	571.750
4th	USA	568.700
5th	West Germany	566.900
6th	Hungary	566.300
7th	Romania	560.850

=== All-around ===
Rank	Gymnast	Floor (gymnastics)	Pommel horse	Rings (gymnastics)	Vault (gymnastics)	Parallel bars	Horizontal bar	Total	Prelims	AA Total
1st place, gold medalist(s)	Nikolai Andrianov (URS)	9.850	9.700	9.900	9.850	9.750	9.850	58.900	58.300	117.200
2nd place, silver medalist(s)	Eizo Kenmotsu (JPN)	9.600	9.750	9.800	9.800	9.800	9.750	58.450	58.050	116.550
3rd place, bronze medalist(s)	Alexander Dityatin (URS)	9.600	9.750	9.700	9.800	9.750	9.800	58.400	57.975	116.375
4	Eberhard Gienger (FRG)	9.650	9.750	9.650	9.800	9.700	9.800	58.350	57.850	116.200
5	Hiroshi Kajiyama (JPN)	9.550	9.700	9.600	9.800	9.700	9.800	57.950	57.950	115.900
6	Kurt Thomas (USA)	9.800	9.750	9.500	9.800	9.650	9.750	58.250	57.475	115.725
7	Shigeru Kasamatsu (JPN)	9.750	8.900	9.700	9.700	9.750	9.800	57.600	58.025	115.625
8	Stoyan Deltchev (BUL)	9.750	9.550	9.400	9.600	9.750	9.500	57.550	57.675	115.225
9	Bart Conner (USA)	9.600	9.800	9.550	9.700	9.650	9.400	57.700	57.500	115.200
10	Michael Nikolay (GDR)	9.400	9.800	9.300	9.800	9.700	9.750	57.750	57.425	115.175
11	Aleksandr Tkachyov (URS)	9.750	8.700	9.700	9.800	9.750	9.550	57.250	57.825	115.075
12	Zoltán Magyar (HUN)	9.550	9.850	9.300	9.750	9.700	9.650	57.800	57.250	115.050
13	Roland Brückner (GDR)	9.600	9.700	9.500	9.750	9.500	9.700	57.750	57.025	114.775
14	Ralf Bartel (GDR)	9.600	9.500	9.550	9.700	9.550	9.650	57.550	56.900	114.450
15	Peter Kovacs (HUN)	9.650	9.500	9.550	9.750	9.400	9.700	57.550	56.650	114.200
16	Ferenc Donath (HUN)	9.500	9.650	9.650	9.200	8.950	9.600	56.550	57.400	113.950
17	Willy Moy (FRA)	9.700	8.700	9.600	9.750	9.200	9.550	57.500	56.425	113.925
17	Volker Rohrwick (FRG)	9.400	9.500	9.500	9.650	9.600	9.600	57.250	56.675	113.925
19	Robert Bretscher (SUI)	9.600	9.600	9.500	9.850	9.500	9.550	57.600	56.250	113.850
20	Mike Wilson (USA)	9.800	9.700	9.400	9.750	9.450	9.300	57.400	56.400	113.800
21	Henri Boerio (FRA)	9.300	9.550	9.550	9.600	9.350	9.800	57.150	56.325	113.475
22	Michel Boutard (FRA)	9.550	9.700	9.550	9.300	9.500	9.650	57.250	56.075	113.325
23	Kurt Szilier (ROM)	9.350	9.550	9.400	9.700	9.350	9.550	57.250	56.075	113.325
24	Dan Grecu (ROM)	9.150	9.600	9.700	9.200	9.400	9.500	56.550	56.350	112.900
25	Ion Checiches (ROM)	9.600	9.400	9.500	9.700	9.300	9.500	57.000	55.775	112.775
26	Jiri Tabak (TCH)	9.650	9.300	9.300	9.700	9.450	9.500	56.900	55.855	112.750
27	Edgar Jorek (FRG)	9.650	9.000	8.850	9.700	9.500	9.450	56.150	56.500	112.650
28	Warren Long (CAN)	9.450	9.300	9.300	9.750	9.000	9.500	56.300	55.825	112.125
29	Andrzej Szajna (POL)	9.600	9.400	8.950	9.800	9.500	9.650	56.900	55.100	112.000
30	Peter Schmid (SUI)	9.200	9.650	9.000	9.600	9.500	9.350	56.300	55.150	111.450
31	Jan Migdau (TCH)	9.450	9.450	9.250	9.650	9.700	9.600	56.100	55.025	111.125
32	Philippe Gaille (SUI)	9.300	9.100	9.150	9.500	9.500	9.400	55.950	55.050	111.000
33	Fernando Bertrand (ESP)	9.400	9.500	9.350	9.200	9.000	9.400	55.850	55.100	110.950
34	Ian Neale (GBR)	9.400	9.150	8.550	9.600	8.700	9.500	54.900	55.700	110.600
35	Jean Choquette (CAN)	9.300	9.400	8.750	9.100	9.000	9.650	55.200	57.350	110.550
36	Juan de la Casa (ESP)	9.300	9.250	8.800	9.600	8.900	9.300	55.200	55.325	110.525

=== Floor exercise ===
Rank	Gymnast	Score	Prelim score	Total
1st place, gold medalist(s)	Kurt Thomas (USA)	9.900	9.750	19.650
2nd place, silver medalist(s)	Shigeru Kasamatsu (JPN)	9.850	9.725	19.575
3rd place, bronze medalist(s)	Alexander Dityatin (URS)	9.700	9.700	19.400
4	Nikolai Andrianov (URS)	9.500	9.850	19.350
5	Stoyan Deltchev (BUL)	9.500	9.700	19.200
6	Edgar Jorek (FRG)	9.450	9.725	19.175
7	Roland Brückner (GDR)	9.100	9.750	18.850
8	Jiří Tabák (TCH)	8.900	9.725	18.625

=== Pommel horse ===
Rank	Gymnast	Score	Prelim score	Total
1st place, gold medalist(s)	Zoltán Magyar (HUN)	9.900	9.900	19.800
2nd place, silver medalist(s)	Eberhard Gienger (FRG)	9.700	9.725	19.425
3rd place, bronze medalist(s)	Stoyan Deltchev (BUL)	9.700	9.700	19.400
4	Alexander Dityatin (URS)	9.700	9.650	19.350
4	Ferenc Donáth (HUN)	9.700	9.650	19.350
6	Michael Nikolay (GDR)	9.650	9.675	19.325
7	Bart Conner (USA)	9.650	9.650	19.300
8	Shigeru Kasamatsu (JPN)	8.950	9.800	18.750

=== Rings ===
Rank	Gymnast	Score	Prelim score	Total
1st place, gold medalist(s)	Nikolai Andrianov (URS)	9.900	9.800	19.700
2nd place, silver medalist(s)	Alexander Dityatin (URS)	9.900	9.775	19.675
3rd place, bronze medalist(s)	Dănuț Grecu (ROU)	9.900	9.750	19.650
4	Shigeru Kasamatsu (JPN)	9.800	9.725	19.525
5	Lutz Mack (GDR)	9.800	9.700	19.500
6	Eizo Kenmotsu (JPN)	9.700	9.775	19.475
7	Nicolae Oprescu (ROU)	9.650	9.675	19.325
8	Ferenc Donáth (HUN)	9.550	9.725	19.275

=== Vault ===
Rank	Gymnast	Score	Prelim score	Total
1st place, gold medalist(s)	Junichi Shimizu (JPN)	9.850	9.750	19.600
2nd place, silver medalist(s)	Nikolai Andrianov (URS)	9.825	9.750	19.575
3rd place, bronze medalist(s)	Ralph Barthel (GDR)	9.825	9.725	19.550
4	Alexander Dityatin (URS)	9.800	9.675	19.525
5	Lutz Mack (GDR)	9.700	9.700	19.400
6	Edgar Jorek (FRG)	9.675	9.700	19.375
7	Bart Conner (USA)	9.525	9.675	19.200
8	Eizo Kenmotsu (JPN)	9.425	9.725	19.150

=== Parallel bars ===
Rank	Gymnast	Score	Prelim score	Total
1st place, gold medalist(s)	Eizo Kenmotsu (JPN)	9.900	9.700	19.600
2nd place, silver medalist(s)	Hiroshi Kajiyama (JPN)	9.750	9.825	19.575
2nd place, silver medalist(s)	Nikolai Andrianov (URS)	9.800	9.775	19.575
4	Aleksandr Tkachyov (URS)	9.750	9.700	19.450
5	Bart Conner (USA)	9.850	9.525	19.375
6	Eberhard Gienger (FRG)	9.700	9.575	19.275
6	Henri Boerio (FRA)	9.700	9.575	19.275
8	Michael Nikolay (GDR)	9.700	9.525	19.225

=== Horizontal bar ===
Rank	Gymnast	Score	Prelim score	Total
1st place, gold medalist(s)	Shigeru Kasamatsu (JPN)	9.900	9.775	19.675
2nd place, silver medalist(s)	Eberhard Gienger (FRG)	9.900	9.750	19.650
3rd place, bronze medalist(s)	Stoyan Deltchev (BUL)	9.900	9.700	19.600
3rd place, bronze medalist(s)	Gennady Krysin (URS)	9.900	9.700	19.600
5	Aleksandr Tkachyov (URS)	9.800	9.700	19.500
6	Michael Nikolay (GDR)	9.800	9.650	19.450
7	Reiner Ruckrein (GDR)	9.650	9.575	19.225
8	Eizo Kenmotsu (JPN)	9.300	9.775	19.075

== Women ==
=== Team final ===
Rank	Team	Vault (gymnastics)		Uneven bars		Balance beam		Floor (gymnastics)		Total
Rank	Team	C	O	C	O	C	O	C	O	Total
1st place, gold medalist(s)	Soviet Union	97.250		96.900		96.700		97.350		388.250
1st place, gold medalist(s)	Elena Mukhina	9.650	9.700	9.750	9.900	9.700	9.800	9.800	9.950	78.250
1st place, gold medalist(s)	Natalia Shaposhnikova	9.700	9.800	9.700	9.750	9.800	9.900	9.900	9.400	77.950
1st place, gold medalist(s)	Nellie Kim	9.650	9.900	9.550	9.700	9.650	9.750	9.750	9.900	77.850
1st place, gold medalist(s)	Maria Filatova	9.700	9.800	9.700	9.800	9.900	9.350	9.800	9.500	77.550
1st place, gold medalist(s)	Tatiana Arzhannikova	9.650	9.700	9.500	9.550	9.400	9.500	9.500	9.800	76.600
1st place, gold medalist(s)	Svetlana Agapova	9.550	9.600	9.600	9.100	9.400	9.300	9.650	9.700	75.900
2nd place, silver medalist(s)	Romania	95.900		96.150		96.550		95.300		383.900
2nd place, silver medalist(s)	Nadia Comăneci	9.750	9.800	9.750	9.700	9.750	9.900	9.700	9.600	77.950
2nd place, silver medalist(s)	Emilia Eberle	9.500	9.800	9.900	9.750	9.700	9.850	9.700	9.700	77.900
2nd place, silver medalist(s)	Teodora Ungureanu	9.600	9.600	9.650	9.500	9.500	9.600	9.400	9.400	76.250
2nd place, silver medalist(s)	Marilena Neacșu	9.500	9.450	9.450	9.400	9.600	9.800	9.450	9.300	75.950
2nd place, silver medalist(s)	Marilena Vlădărău	9.350	9.550	9.650	8.950	9.600	9.250	9.500	9.500	75.350
2nd place, silver medalist(s)	Anca Grigoraș	9.500	9.400	9.550	9.400	9.400	9.400	9.300	9.300	75.250

=== All-around ===
Rank	Gymnast	Vault (gymnastics)	Uneven bars	Balance beam	Floor (gymnastics)	Score	Prelim score	Total
1st place, gold medalist(s)	Elena Mukhina (URS)	9.900	9.900	9.850	9.950	39.600	39.125	78.725
2nd place, silver medalist(s)	Nellie Kim (URS)	9.900	9.900	9.900	9.950	39.650	38.925	78.575
3rd place, bronze medalist(s)	Natalia Shaposhnikova (URS)	9.850	9.850	9.400	9.800	38.900	38.975	77.875
4	Nadia Comăneci (ROU)	9.900	9.250	9.800	9.800	38.750	38.975	77.725
5	Emilia Eberle (ROU)	9.700	9.750	9.250	9.650	38.350	38.950	77.300
6	Věra Černá (TCH)	9.700	9.550	9.800	9.700	38.750	38.275	77.025
7	Steffi Kräker (GDR)	9.800	9.800	9.550	9.550	38.700	38.250	76.950
8	Kathy Johnson (USA)	9.800	9.600	9.250	9.900	38.550	38.275	76.825
9	Rhonda Schwandt (USA)	9.850	9.800	9.050	9.800	38.500	38.150	76.650
10	Zsuzsa Kalmár (HUN)	9.700	9.650	9.700	9.500	38.550	38.050	76.600
11	Silvia Hindorff (GDR)	9.650	9.200	9.700	9.550	38.100	38.300	76.400
12	Éva Óvári (HUN)	9.400	9.650	9.650	9.500	38.020	38.175	76.375
13	Dana Brýdlová (TCH)	9.550	9.750	9.650	9.450	38.400	37.925	76.325
14	Marilena Neacșu (ROU)	9.500	9.600	9.550	9.650	38.300	37.974	76.275
15	Birgit Süß (GDR)	9.550	9.800	8.900	9.500	37.900	38.325	76.225
16	Eva Marečková (TCH)	9.750	9.600	9.400	9.650	38.400	37.600	76.000
17	Karen Kelsall (CAN)	9.550	9.650	9.500	9.500	38.200	37.475	75.675
18	Łucja Matraszek (POL)	9.500	9.600	9.450	9.350	37.900	37.700	75.600
19	Éva Kanyó (HUN)	9.350	9.650	9.500	9.300	37.800	37.775	75.575
20	Marcia Frederick (USA)	9.700	9.900	9.000	9.700	38.300	37.200	75.500
21	Annette Michler (FRG)	9.550	9.650	9.450	9.350	38.000	37.375	75.375
22	Elfi Schlegel (CAN)	9.600	9.250	9.350	9.600	37.800	37.475	75.275
23	Yayoi Kano (JPN)	9.400	9.650	8.900	9.550	37.500	37.625	75.125
24	Sakiko Nozawa (JPN)	9.450	9.650	9.350	9.500	37.950	37.100	75.050
24	Petra Kurbjuweit (FRG)	9.450	9.650	9.300	9.500	37.900	37.150	75.050
26	Annette Toifl (FRG)	9.550	9.650	9.450	9.250	37.900	36.975	74.875
27	Irina Goreva (BUL)	9.450	9.500	9.550	9.450	37.950	36.800	74.750
28	Yoshiko Matsumoto (JPN)	9.600	9.650	8.950	9.350	37.550	37.175	74.725
29	Romi Kessler (SUI)	9.600	9.400	9.350	9.500	37.850	36.550	74.400
30	Diliana Glucheva (BUL)	9.500	9.650	8.900	9.400	37.450	36.725	74.175
31	Monica Valentini (ITA)	9.300	9.400	9.300	9.300	37.300	36.750	74.050
32	Silvia Topalova (BUL)	9.400	9.700	8.400	9.450	36.950	37.050	74.000
33	Sherry Hawco (CAN)	9.300	9.350	9.450	9.050	37.150	36.800	73.950
34	Małgorzata Sosin (POL)	9.450	9.450	8.900	9.400	37.200	36.625	73.825
35	Ingrid Bolleboom (NED)	9.350	9.500	8.750	9.300	36.900	36.850	73.750
36	Aurora Morata (ESP)	9.350	9.500	8.200	9.400	36.450	36.575	73.025

=== Vault ===
Rank	Gymnast	Score	Prelim score	Total
1st place, gold medalist(s)	Nellie Kim (URS)	9.850	9.775	19.625
2nd place, silver medalist(s)	Nadia Comăneci (ROU)	9.825	9.775	19.600
3rd place, bronze medalist(s)	Steffi Kräker (GDR)	9.800	9.750	19.550
4	Rhonda Schwandt (USA)	9.850	9.675	19.525
5	Emilia Eberle (ROU)	9.800	9.650	19.450
6	Natalia Shaposhnikova (URS)	9.650	9.750	19.400
7	Heike Kunhardt (GDR)	9.500	9.700	19.200
8	Andrea Horacsek (HUN)	9.450	9.625	19.075

=== Uneven bars ===
Rank	Gymnast	Score	Prelim score	Total
1st place, gold medalist(s)	Marcia Frederick (USA)	9.950	9.850	19.800
2nd place, silver medalist(s)	Elena Mukhina (URS)	9.900	9.825	19.725
3rd place, bronze medalist(s)	Emilia Eberle (ROU)	9.800	9.825	19.625
4	Maria Filatova (URS)	9.850	9.750	19.600
5	Nadia Comăneci (ROU)	9.850	9.725	19.575
6	Steffi Kräker (GDR)	9.800	9.700	19.500
7	Věra Černá (TCH)	9.700	9.600	19.300
8	Birgit Süß (FRG)	9.200	9.625	18.825

=== Balance beam ===
Rank	Gymnast	Score	Prelim score	Total
1st place, gold medalist(s)	Nadia Comăneci (ROU)	9.800	9.825	19.625
2nd place, silver medalist(s)	Elena Mukhina (URS)	9.850	9.750	19.600
3rd place, bronze medalist(s)	Emilia Eberle (ROU)	9.800	9.775	19.575
4	Éva Óvári (HUN)	9.700	9.700	19.400
5	Věra Černá (TCH)	9.700	9.600	19.300
6	Silvia Hindorff (GDR)	9.600	9.625	19.225
7	Éva Kanyó (HUN)	9.250	9.650	18.900
8	Natalia Shaposhnikova (URS)	9.000	9.850	18.850

=== Floor exercise ===
Rank	Gymnast	Score	Prelim score	Total
1st place, gold medalist(s)	Nellie Kim (URS)	9.950	9.825	19.775
1st place, gold medalist(s)	Elena Mukhina (URS)	9.900	9.875	19.775
3rd place, bronze medalist(s)	Kathy Johnson (USA)	9.850	9.675	19.525
3rd place, bronze medalist(s)	Emilia Eberle (ROU)	9.825	9.700	19.525
5	Silvia Hindorff (GDR)	9.700	9.775	19.475
6	Věra Černá (TCH)	9.750	9.700	19.450
7	Birgit Süß (GDR)	9.700	9.675	19.375
8	Nadia Comăneci (ROU)	9.600	9.650	19.250

== Medals ==
Rank	Nation	Gold	Silver	Bronze	Total
1	Soviet Union (URS)	7	7	4	18
2	Japan (JPN)	4	3	0	7
3	United States (USA)	2	0	1	3
4	Romania (ROU)	1	2	4	7
5	Hungary (HUN)	1	0	0	1
6	West Germany (FRG)	0	2	0	2
7	East Germany (GDR)	0	0	4	4
8	Bulgaria (BUL)	0	0	2	2
Totals (8 entries)		15	14	15	44
