= Marilena (name) =

Marilena is a female given name that may refer to:

- Marilena Ansaldi
- Marilena Bocu
- Marilena Doiciu
- Marilena Georgiou
- Marilena Kirchner
- Marilena Marin
- Marilena Neacșu
- Marilena Preda Sânc
- Marilena de Souza Chaui
- Marilena Vilialis-Soukoulis
- Marilena Vlădărău
- Marilena Widmer
