= Leur =

Leur can refer to:

== People ==
- Verona van de Leur (born 1985), Dutch gymnast

== Place names ==
- Leur, Wijchen, a village in the Netherlands, in the province of Gelderland
- Etten-Leur, a town in the Netherlands, in the province of North-Brabant, comprising two former villages, Etten and Leur
