= 1979 FIG Artistic Gymnastics World Cup =

International gymnastics competition

The 1979 Artistic Gymnastics World Cup was held in Tokyo, Japan in 1979.

== Medal winners ==
Event	Gold	Silver	Bronze	Ref.
Men's individual all-around	(Soviet Union) Aleksandr Dityatin	(Japan) Shigeru Kasamatsu	(Bulgaria) Stoyan Deltchev	
Women's individual all-around	(Soviet Union) Stella Zakharova	(Soviet Union) Nellie Kim (Romania) Emilia Eberle	None awarded	
Men's floor exercise	(Japan) Shigeru Kasamatsu (Bulgaria) Stoyan Deltchev	None awarded	(Japan) Hiroshi Kajiyama	
Men's pommel horse	(United States) Bart Conner	(Japan) Shigeru Kasamatsu	(United States) Kurt Thomas	
Men's still rings	(Soviet Union) Aleksandr Dityatin	(Soviet Union) Eduard Azarian	(Japan) Hiroshi Kajiyama (Hungary) Ferenc Donath	
Men's vault	(East Germany) Ralph Bartel	(Soviet Union) Aleksandr Dityatin (Soviet Union) Valentin Turbanov	None awarded	
Men's parallel bars	(Japan) Eizo Kenmotsu	(Soviet Union) Aleksandr Dityatin	(Hungary) Ferenc Donath	
Men's horizontal bar	(West Germany) Eberhard Gienger	(Japan) Eizo Kenmotsu (Soviet Union) Aleksandr Dityatin (Japan) Hiroshi Kajiyama	None awarded	
Women's vault	(Romania) Nadia Comăneci	(Soviet Union) Stella Zakharova	(Soviet Union) Nellie Kim	
Women's uneven bars	(East Germany) Steffi Kräker (Romania) Emilia Eberle	None awarded	(Soviet Union) Stella Zakharova (Czechoslovakia) Vera Cerna (Hungary) Zsuzsa Kalmar	
Women's balance beam	(Romania) Emilia Eberle	(Romania) Nadia Comăneci	(Soviet Union) Nellie Kim (East Germany) Steffi Kräker	
Women's floor exercise	(Romania) Nadia Comăneci	(Soviet Union) Stella Zakharova	(Romania) Emilia Eberle	
