= Verona van de Leur =

Dutch gymnast and adult movie performer (born 1985)

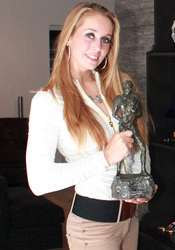

Personal information
- Full name: Verona van de Leur
- Born: 27 December 1985 (age 40) Gouda, The Netherlands

Gymnastics career
- Discipline: Women's artistic gymnastics
- Country represented: Netherlands
- Former coach: Boris Orlov
- Retired: 2008
Medal record
World Championships
Silver medal – second place	2002 Debrecen	Floor Exercise
World Cup Final
Gold medal – first place	2002 Stuttgart	Floor Exercise
Bronze medal – third place	2002 Stuttgart	Vault
Bronze medal – third place	2002 Stuttgart	Uneven Bars
European Championships
Silver medal – second place	2002 Patras	Team
Silver medal – second place	2002 Patras	All-Around
Silver medal – second place	2002 Patras	Vault
Bronze medal – third place	2002 Patras	Balance Beam
Bronze medal – third place	2002 Patras	Floor Exercise

Verona van de Leur (born 27 December 1985) is a retired Dutch artistic gymnast and adult film performer. She was named Dutch Sportswoman of the Year in 2002 after winning the all-around silver medal at that year's European championships and the silver medal on floor exercise at the world championships.

Van de Leur retired from gymnastics in 2008, after which she suffered personal difficulties, including a conviction for blackmail and a prison sentence. She began performing in adult webcam shows and then in adult films from 2011 to 2019.

== Biography ==
Van de Leur, born in Gouda, South Holland, the Netherlands, began with gymnastic at 5 years of age at gym T.O.O.S. Waddinxveen. At the age of 9, she started to train at Pro Patria in Zoetermeer.

Her first national appearance was at the Dutch National Championship in 2000. She was the junior Dutch all-around champion and won three event finals. One year later, in 2001, she was the Dutch all-around women's champion. With the Dutch team she surprising took the fifth place in the World Championship in Ghent. This performance made them the Dutch sports team of the year 2001.

2002 was Van de Leur's break-out year on the international stage. She won five medals at the European Championship in Patras, Greece, including silver medals in the team competition, the all-around (behind Svetlana Khorkina) and on beam. She also won a bronze medal on floor exercise. Van der Leur then won silver on the floor exercise at the World Championships in Debrecen, Hungary, and gold at the World Cup Finals on the same apparatus. She was elected 2002 Dutch Sportswoman of the Year and once again they were sports team of the year.

Van de Leur and Renske Endel were drawn as a reserve for the World Cup of 2003 in Anaheim and the Dutch team was not placed among the top twelve. Therefore, the gymnast didn't qualify for the Olympics in Athens. Then it came to a rift between her coach Frank and Van de Leur, leading her to move to The Hazenkamp in Nijmegen, the club of trainer Boris Orlov. In 2007, Van de Leur won the Dutch all-around champions for the fourth time. At the National Championships in Nijmegen she also won gold on beam and floor exercise and bronze on bars.

On 19 June 2008, Van de Leur publicly announced her retirement from gymnastics. Conflicts with the gymnastics federation and a lack of motivation also caused by a problematic situation at home, have reportedly played an important role in her decision.

== Legal problems ==
In early May 2011, Van de Leur was convicted of blackmailing an adulterous couple she had been following. She served 72 days in prison.

== Adult performances ==
When Van de Leur's career ended, she fell out with her family and was homeless for two years living in her car. After being homeless for two years and in jail, Van de Leur saw a way out in late October 2011 with the adult film industry. She decided to work as a webcam girl and then started her own adult website, which includes adult films. She only worked with her boyfriend and quit as an adult performer in November 2019.

== Competitive history ==
Competition	Total		Apparatus			
	All around	Team	Vault	Bars	Beam	Floor
Zoetermeer Toekomst Tournament 1995	6					
Dutch national championship 1995	3					
Dutch national championship 1996	8		5	5		
Ecoair (international tournament, NL) 1997	4		1			
Dutch national championship 1997	3		4	2	4	2
France – Netherlands 1998	8	1				
Dutch national championship 1998	5		4	5	6	
Berolina Cup 1998	7	2				
Leverkusen Cup 1998	2					
Ecoair (international tournament, NL) 1998	1					
Clubteam Nationals 1998		1				
Budapest Cup 1998	1	1				
Sidijk Tournament 1999	2					
Lugano Cup 1999	1	1				
Como Cup 1999	2	1				
Dutch national championship 1999	2		1	1	2	3
European Youth Olympic Days 1999	3	3		5		3
Berolina Cup 1999	3	1				
Clubteams Nationals 1999		1				
HGT (international tournament, NL) 1999	3					
Honeywell Cup 1999	1	1	6	1	1	1
Youth Europeans 2000	11	3		3	4	
Dutch National Championship 2000	1		1	1	1	3
Beronila Cup 2000	4	1				
HGT (international tournament, NL) 2000	1		1	1		2
Clubteams Nationals 2000		1				
Massilia Cup 2000			6	1		5
Parijs Bercy 2001			6	1		4
Cottbus 2001			4	6		
Cottbus Winners Final 2001						1
Ploiesti 2001	6		2	1		3
Dutch National Championship semi final 2001	1		1	1	1	2
Dutch National Championship 2001	1		3	1	1	1
World Championship 2001	9	5	6	8		
Massilia Cup 2001	5	3	4	1		3
HGT (international tournament, NL) 2001	1		2	1	1	1
Clubteam Nationals 2001		1				
Glasgow 2001			2	2	2	1
USA Visa Cup 2002	3		3	6	2	2
Cottbus 2002					3	
Cottbus – Winners Final 2002			2			
European Championship 2002	2	2	2		3	3
Dutch National Championship semi final 2002	1		1	2	3	1
Li Ning Cup 2002			2	1	3	2
Dutch National Championship 2002	1		1	2	1	1
HGT (international tournament, NL) 2002	1		1	1		
Massilia Cup 2002	4	3		1		2
World Championship 2002			7			2
DTB World Cup Final 2002			3	3	7	1
World Championship 2003						
World Championship final 2004						7
Dutch National Championship 2005	3					
European Championship 2007	9					
Dutch National Championship 2007	1			3	1	1
European Championship 2008		8	9			

== In culture ==
Van de Leur is the subject of the song Verona van de Leur by Ellen ten Damme

Awards
Preceded by Inge de Bruijn	Dutch Sportswoman of the Year; 2002	Succeeded by Leontien Zijlaard-van Moorsel
