= Boris Orlov (coach) =

Russian gymnastics coach

Boris Georgievich Orlov (Russian: Борис Георгиевич Орлов; 20 February 1945, Moscow – 3 July 2018, Nijmegen) was a Russian gymnastics coach.

Orlov studied gymnastics in Moscow, and was trained as coach. During his military service he also worked as circus artist. During the 1980s he was coach of the national gymnastics team of the Soviet Union and he worked at the gymnastics department of Spartak Moscow. He coached, among others, Olga Bicherova who would become world champion.

in 1986 he moved to the Netherlands as part of an exchange program with the Russian gymnastics federation and worked for a while in France. He was for four years head trainer for the Dutch gymnastics federation (KNGU) at National Sports Centre Papendal. After a conflict with KNGU, he moved in 1993 to Stuttgart, Germany. Between 1994 and 1999 he worked again with KNGU, now as head coach. Between 1996 and 2008 he was also head trainer at the gymnastics club GTV De Hazenkamp in Nijmegen. He coached, among others, the Dutch successful gymnasts Suzanne Harmes, Renske Endel and Verona van de Leur. He collaborated with Esther Heijnen and worked with Yuri van Gelder during Van Gelder's suspension.
