= Gennady Krysin =

Russian artistic gymnast

- Геннадий Владимирович Крысин
- Full name: Gennady Vladimirovich Krysin
- Born: 25 December 1957 (age 68) Moscow, Russian SFSR, Soviet Union
- Height: 1.69 m (5 ft 7 in)

Gymnastics career
- Discipline: Men's artistic gymnastics
- Country represented: Soviet Union
- Club: Burevestnik Moskva
Medal record
Men's artistic gymnastics
Representing Soviet Union
Olympic Games
Silver medal – second place	1976 Montreal	Team
World Championships
Silver medal – second place	1978 Strasbourg	Team
Bronze medal – third place	1978 Strasbourg	Horizontal bar

Gennady Vladimirovich Krysin (born 25 December 1957 in Moscow) is a Russian former gymnast who competed in the 1976 Summer Olympics.
