= Gymnastics at the 1981 Summer Universiade =

The Gymnastics competitions in the 1981 Summer Universiade were held in Bucharest, Romania.

== Men's events ==
Event	Gold	Silver	Bronze
Individual all-around	Yuri Korolev (URS); Kurt Szilier (ROM)		Artur Akopian (URS)
Horizontal Bar	Emilian Nicula (ROM)	Zhou Limin (CHN)	Yuri Korolev (URS)
Parallel Bars	Sotomura Koji (JPN)	Li Yuejiu (CHN)	Yuri Korolev (URS)
Vault	Li Yuejiu (CHN)	Dan Odorhean (ROM)	Yuri Korolev (URS)
Pommel Horse	Yuri Korolev (URS); Li Ning (CHN); Li Xiaoping (CHN); Kurt Szilier (ROM)		
Rings	Li Ning (CHN)	Artur Akopian (URS)	Emilian Nicula (ROM)
Floor Exercise	Li Ning (CHN); Dan Odorhean (ROM)		Yuri Korolev (URS); Li Juejin (CHN)
Team all-around	Romania (ROM)	Soviet Union (URS)	China (CHN)

== Women's events ==
Event	Gold	Silver	Bronze
Individual all-around	Nadia Comăneci (ROM)	Stella Zakharova (URS)	Dumitriţa Turner (ROM)
Uneven Bars	Nadia Comăneci (ROM); Emilia Eberle (ROM)		Zhu Zheng (CHN)
Balance Beam	Emilia Eberle (ROM)	Dumitriţa Turner (ROM)	Stella Zakharova (URS)
Vault	Nadia Comăneci (ROM); Stella Zakharova (URS)		Dumitriţa Turner (ROM)
Floor Exercise	Nadia Comăneci (ROM)	Rodica Dunca (ROM)	Stella Zakharova (URS)
Team all-around	Romania (ROM)	Soviet Union (URS)	China (CHN)

=== Medal table ===
Rank	Nation	Gold	Silver	Bronze	Total
1	Romania (ROU)	12	3	3	18
2	China (CHN)	5	2	4	11
3	Soviet Union (URS)	3	4	7	14
4	Japan (JPN)	1	0	0	1
Totals (4 entries)		21	9	14	44
