= 1978 FIG Artistic Gymnastics World Cup =

International gymnastics competition

The 1978 Artistic Gymnastics World Cup was held in São Paulo, Brazil in 1978.

== Medal winners ==
Event	Gold	Silver	Bronze	Ref.
Men's individual all-around	(Soviet Union) Aleksandr Dityatin	(United States) Kurt Thomas	(Soviet Union) Eduard Azaryan	
Women's individual all-around	(Soviet Union) Maria Filatova	(East Germany) Silvia Hindorff	(Soviet Union) Natalia Shaposhnikova	
Men's floor exercise	(East Germany) Roland Brückner	(United States) Kurt Thomas	(Soviet Union) Aleksandr Dityatin	
Men's pommel horse	(Hungary) Zoltan Magyar	(Soviet Union) Aleksandr Dityatin	(United States) Kurt Thomas	
Men's still rings	(Soviet Union) Aleksandr Dityatin	(Romania) Dan Grecu	(Soviet Union) Eduard Azarian (Japan) Junichi Shimizu	
Men's vault	(Japan) Junichi Shimizu	(East Germany) Roland Brückner	(Soviet Union) Aleksandr Dityatin	
Men's parallel bars	(Soviet Union) Eduard Azaryan	(West Germany) Eberhard Gienger (United States) Bart Conner	None awarded	
Men's horizontal bar	(West Germany) Eberhard Gienger	(United States) Kurt Thomas	(Soviet Union) Aleksandr Dityatin (Soviet Union) Aleksandr Tkachyov	
Women's vault	(Soviet Union) Natalia Shaposhnikova	(United States) Rhonda Schwandt	(East Germany) Steffi Kräker	
Women's uneven bars	(East Germany) Steffi Kräker	(Czechoslovakia) Vera Cerna	(United States) Rhonda Schwandt	
Women's balance beam	(Czechoslovakia) Vera Cerna	(Soviet Union) Natalia Shaposhnikova	(Soviet Union) Svetlana Agapova	
Women's floor exercise	(Soviet Union) Maria Filatova	(Soviet Union) Natalia Shaposhnikova	(United States) Kathy Johnson	
