= 1977 FIG Artistic Gymnastics World Cup =

International gymnastics competition

The 1977 Artistic Gymnastics World Cup was held in Oviedo, Spain in 1977.

== Medal winners ==
Event	Gold	Silver	Bronze	Ref.
Men's individual all-around	(Soviet Union) Nikolay Andrianov (Soviet Union) Vladimir Markelov	None awarded	(Soviet Union) Aleksandr Tkachyov	
Women's individual all-around	(Soviet Union) Maria Filatova	(East Germany) Steffi Kräker	(Soviet Union) Natalia Shaposhnikova	
Men's floor exercise	(Soviet Union) Nikolay Andrianov	(Soviet Union) Aleksandr Tkachyov	(Soviet Union) Vladimir Markelov	
Men's pommel horse	(Soviet Union) Vladimir Markelov (East Germany) Michael Nikolay	None awarded	(Soviet Union) Aleksandr Tkachyov	
Men's still rings	(Soviet Union) Nikolay Andrianov	(Soviet Union) Vladimir Markelov	(Soviet Union) Aleksandr Tkachyov	
Men's vault	(Soviet Union) Vladimir Markelov	(Soviet Union) Nikolay Andrianov	(East Germany) Roland Brückner	
Men's parallel bars	(Soviet Union) Nikolay Andrianov	(Soviet Union) Vladimir Markelov	(Japan) Sawao Kato	
Men's horizontal bar	(West Germany) Eberhard Gienger (Soviet Union) Vladimir Markelov (Soviet Union) Aleksandr Tkachyov	None awarded	None awarded	
Women's vault	(Soviet Union) Natalia Shaposhnikova	(Soviet Union) Maria Filatova	(Hungary) Márta Egervári	
Women's uneven bars	(Soviet Union) Elena Mukhina	(Soviet Union) Maria Filatova	(East Germany) Steffi Kräker	
Women's balance beam	(Soviet Union) Elena Mukhina	(East Germany) Steffi Kräker	(Romania) Anca Grigoraș	
Women's floor exercise	(Soviet Union) Maria Filatova	(Czechoslovakia) Vera Cerna (East Germany) Steffi Kräker	None awarded	

=== All-around ===
Rank	Gymnast	Vault (gymnastics)	Uneven bars	Balance beam	Floor (gymnastics)	Total
1st place, gold medalist(s)	Maria Filatova (URS)	9.700	9.750	9.650	9.850	38.950
2nd place, silver medalist(s)	Steffi Kraker (GDR)	9.650	9.700	9.450	9.650	38.450
3rd place, bronze medalist(s)	Natalia Shaposhnikova (URS)	9.750	9.400	9.200	9.850	38.200
4	Marta Egervari (HUN)	9.700	9.550	9.400	9.450	38.100
5	Elena Mukhina (URS)	9.200	9.800	9.600	9.350	37.950
6	Věra Černá (TCH)	9.550	9.450	9.150	9.650	37.800
7	Anca Grigoras (ROM)	9.450	9.450	9.400	9.450	37.750
8	Judit Muller (HUN)	9.500	9.250	9.400	9.300	37.450
8	Lisa Cawthron (USA)	9.700	9.250	9.200	9.300	37.450
10	Marina Schalk (GDR)	9.300	9.500	9.500	9.150	37.400
11	Rodica Sabau (ROM)	9.150	9.300	9.250	9.450	37.150
11	Gabriela Trusca (ROM)	9.400	8.950	9.450	9.350	37.150
13	Petra Kurbjuweit (FRG)	9.400	9.350	8.850	9.500	37.100
14	Tatiana Lickova (TCH)	9.350	8.850	9.150	9.400	36.750
15	Aurora Mourata (ESP)	8.800	9.150	9.000	9.200	36.150
16	Denise Cheshire (USA)	9.500	8.200	9.000	9.300	36.000
