= Marilena Vlădărău =

Romanian artistic gymnast

- Born: 16 August 1963 (age 63) Bucharest, Romania

Gymnastics career
- Discipline: Women's artistic gymnastics
- Country represented: Romania
- Head coach: Béla Károlyi
- Assistant coach: Marta Károlyi
Medal record
World Championships
Gold medal – first place	1979 Fort Worth	Team
Silver medal – second place	1978 Strasbourg	Team

Marilena Vlădărău (born 16 August 1963) is a Romanian former artistic gymnast. In 1979, she was a member of the first Romanian team to win gold at the World Artistic Gymnastics Championships. She had previously won the silver medal with the Romanian team at the 1978 World Championships. After retirement, she worked as a coach.
