= 1980 FIG Artistic Gymnastics World Cup =

International gymnastics competition

The 1980 Artistic Gymnastics World Cup was held in Toronto, Canada in 1980.

== Medal winners ==
Event	Gold	Silver	Bronze	Ref.
Men's individual all-around	(Soviet Union) Bogdan Makuts	(Soviet Union) Eduard Azaryan	(Japan) Koji Gushiken	
Women's individual all-around	(Soviet Union) Stella Zakharova	(East Germany) Maxi Gnauck	(East Germany) Steffi Kräker	
Men's floor exercise	(East Germany) Roland Brückner	(China) Li Yuejiu (Czechoslovakia) Jiří Tabák	None awarded	
Men's pommel horse	(East Germany) Roland Brückner	(Japan) Toshiomi Nishiki (Japan) Koji Gushiken	None awarded	
Men's still rings	(Soviet Union) Bogdan Makuts (China) Huang Yubin	None awarded	(Japan) Toshiomi Nishiki (Japan) Koji Gushiken	
Men's vault	(East Germany) Roland Brückner	(Soviet Union) Bogdan Makuts (Japan) Hiroshi Kajiyama	None awarded	
Men's parallel bars	(China) Li Yuejiu	(Soviet Union) Bogdan Makuts	(China) Huang Yubin	
Men's horizontal bar	(China) Li Yuejiu (Soviet Union) Bogdan Makuts (Japan) Toshiomi Nishiki	None awarded	None awarded	
Women's vault	(Soviet Union) Stella Zakharova	(Czechoslovakia) Jana Labakova	(Romania) Cristina Grigoraș (Canada) Elfi Schlegel	
Women's uneven bars	(East Germany) Maxi Gnauck	(East Germany) Steffi Kräker	(China) Zhu Zheng	
Women's balance beam	(Soviet Union) Elena Naimushina	(Czechoslovakia) Radka Zemanova (Soviet Union) Maria Filatova	None awarded	
Women's floor exercise	(East Germany) Maxi Gnauck	(Soviet Union) Elena Naimushina (Soviet Union) Stella Zakharova	None awarded	
