= Artistic Gymnastics World Cup =

Competition series for artistic gymnastics

- Current season, competition or edition: 2026 FIG Artistic Gymnastics World Cup series
- Sport: Artistic gymnastics
- Founded: 1975
- Countries: Worldwide

The Artistic Gymnastics World Cup is a competition series for artistic gymnastics sanctioned by the Fédération Internationale de Gymnastique (FIG). It is one of the few tournaments in artistic gymnastics officially organized by FIG, as well as the World Championships and the gymnastics competitions at the Olympic Games and the Youth Olympics.

== History ==
The Fédération Internationale de Gymnastique (FIG) hosted the first artistic gymnastics on an international scale in 1975. This genre of sport from then onwards was named as the Artistic Gymnastics World Cup, an original competition reserved for the current best gymnasts. It was composed of a single and unique event, bringing together very few gymnasts in all around competition and in apparatus finals. This initiative was taken in a particular context, since the world championships took place merely every four years. The world cup event held every year for artistic gymnastics was, however, upheld only until 1990.

In 1997, the World Cup was revived as a series of qualifying events for a period of two years, culminating in a final event that was known as the World Cup Final. The different stages, sometimes referred to as World Cup qualifiers, mostly served the purpose of awarding points to individual gymnasts and groups according to their placements. These points would be added up over the two-year period to qualify a limited number of athletes to the biennial World Cup Final event. Six World Cup Final events were staged in even years from 1998 to 2008. For example, the World Cup Final competition in 1998 served as the last stage of a series of competitions through the 1997–1998 season. At the World Cup Final, gold, silver and bronze medals were awarded to individual athletes in each apparatus.

Eight standalone World Cup events had been staged from 1975 to 1990, and FIG retroactively named these events World Cup Final. The gymnasts were invited to these world cups based on results from the previous world championships or Olympic Games. From 1997 to 2008, the World Cup series of qualifying events were the only way athletes could qualify for the World Cup Final. At the FIG Council in Cape Town (South Africa) in May 2008, members decided to no longer run any world cup and series finals for all FIG disciplines from January 2009.

In 2011, the apparatus competitions were renamed World Challenge Cups while the all-around competitions kept the World Cup name. In 2013, FIG created three distinct competition series with the reintroduction of the Individual Apparatus World Cup series, along with the existing All-Around World Cup series and the World Challenge Cup series.

== Current format ==
Beginning in 2009, the World Cup has been competed strictly as a series of stages with no culminating final event. In each of the stages, the top three gymnasts in each apparatus or the all-around, depending on the type of competition, are awarded medals and prize money. There are currently three separate series run by the FIG: the All-Around World Cup series (C-II), the Individual Apparatus World Cup (C-III) series, and the World Challenge Cup series. For the All-Around World Cup series, gymnasts' standing counts toward their countries' final placement. For the latter two series, gymnasts' standing counts toward their own individual ranking, and they do not pool results with their teammates.

The two individual apparatus series are open to all athletes and are especially popular among athletes from countries with smaller gymnastics programs. The All-Around World Cup series, however, is an invitation-only series of competitions for the top countries at the previous year's World Championships or Olympic Games. Each of the eight competing countries at any given cup has the option to choose any one gymnast to compete with the exception of the host country, which has a wild-card spot for a second gymnast.

After each stage, all gymnasts (not just medal winners) are awarded points according to their placement, with the winner of each competition receiving the maximum number of 30 points per competition. After the last event of the World Cup series, the three or four best results at the World Cup stages count towards a ranking list. The same is true for the World Challenge Cup series. The individual gymnast with the highest number of points in each apparatus is then declared the winner of the series. For the All-Around World Cup, the country with the most points total is victorious. Only the winning nation receives a cup at the end of the series, while the top three gymnasts receive prize money.

The All-Around World Cup and the World Challenge Cup series are both one-year long series, with the competing nations at the All-Around World Cup series changing yearly. For the Individual Apparatus World Cup, the winner in each apparatus is declared after a two-year long series, beginning shortly after the World Championships or Olympic Games in an even-numbered year and concluding two years later.

== Olympic Games qualification ==
In the 2017–2020 quadrennium, the All-Around and Individual Apparatus World Cup series were used to qualify a maximum of seven spots to the 2020 Olympic Games. The following quadrennium (2021–2024), the Apparatus World Cup series held in the Olympic year was used to qualify two gymnasts per apparatus to the 2024 Olympic Games.

== Events ==
=== World Cup Final ===
Year	Event	Location	Type
1975	1st World Cup Final	(United Kingdom) London	All-around (C-II) and apparatus (C-III)
1977	2nd World Cup Final	(Spain) Oviedo	All-around (C-II) and apparatus (C-III)
1978	3rd World Cup Final	(Brazil) São Paulo	All-around (C-II) and apparatus (C-III)
1979	4th World Cup Final	(Japan) Tokyo	All-around (C-II) and apparatus (C-III)
1980	5th World Cup Final	(Canada) Toronto	All-around (C-II) and apparatus (C-III)
1982	6th World Cup Final	(Socialist Federal Republic of Yugoslavia) Zagreb	All-around (C-II) and apparatus (C-III)
1986	7th World Cup Final	(China) Beijing	All-around (C-II) and apparatus (C-III)
1990	8th World Cup Final	(Belgium) Brussels	All-around (C-II) and apparatus (C-III)
1998	9th World Cup Final	(Japan) Sabae	Apparatus (C-III)
2000	10th World Cup Final	(United Kingdom) Glasgow	Apparatus (C-III)
2002	11th World Cup Final	(Germany) Stuttgart	Apparatus (C-III)
2004	12th World Cup Final	(United Kingdom) Birmingham	Apparatus (C-III)
2006	13th World Cup Final	(Brazil) São Paulo	Apparatus (C-III)
2008	14th World Cup Final	(Spain) Madrid	Apparatus (C-III)

=== World Cup qualifiers ===
From 1997 to 2008, a series of World Cup qualifiers were staged. The top 3 gymnasts in each apparatus at the qualifier events would receive medals and prize money. Gymnasts who finished in the top 8 would also receive points that would be added up to a ranking which would qualify individual gymnasts for the biennial World Cup Final.

Years	Series	Format
1997–1998	1997–1998 FIG Artistic Gymnastics World Cup series	Apparatus (C-III)
1999–2000	1999–2000 FIG Artistic Gymnastics World Cup series	Apparatus (C-III)
2001–2002	2001–2002 FIG Artistic Gymnastics World Cup series	Apparatus (C-III)
2003–2004	2003–2004 FIG Artistic Gymnastics World Cup series	Apparatus (C-III)
2005–2006	2005–2006 FIG Artistic Gymnastics World Cup series	Apparatus (C-III)
2007–2008	2007–2008 FIG Artistic Gymnastics World Cup series	Apparatus (C-III)

=== World Cup series ===
In 2009 and 2010, events in the Artistic Gymnastics World Cup series were divided into Category A events (reserved for invited athletes only) and Category B events (open to all athletes). In 2011 and 2012, the individual apparatus competitions were renamed World Challenge Cup events while the all-around competitions retained the World Cup name. Since 2013, the World Cup series has been divided into three groups: 1) the All-Around World Cup series; 2) the World Challenge Cup series; and 3) the Individual Apparatus World Cup series. All of the World Challenge Cup and Individual Apparatus World Cup competitions remain open to all athletes, while the All-Around World Cup competitions are by invitation only, according to the results of the previous World Championships or Olympic Games. In 2021, the All-Around World Cup series was canceled because of the COVID-19 pandemic and has not been brought back for the 2021-2024 Olympic cycle.

Year	Series	Individual Apparatus World Cup events	All-Around World Cup events	World Challenge Cup events
2009	2009 FIG Artistic Gymnastics World Cup series	8	—N/a	—N/a
2010	2010 FIG Artistic Gymnastics World Cup series	12	—N/a	—N/a
2011	2011 FIG Artistic Gymnastics World Cup series	—N/a	4	8
2012	2012 FIG Artistic Gymnastics World Cup series	—N/a	3	7
2013	2013 FIG Artistic Gymnastics World Cup series	1	4	5
2014	2014 FIG Artistic Gymnastics World Cup series	—N/a	4	6
2015	2015 FIG Artistic Gymnastics World Cup series	—N/a	1	7
2016	2016 FIG Artistic Gymnastics World Cup series	1	3	10
2017	2017 FIG Artistic Gymnastics World Cup series	3	3	6
2018	2018 FIG Artistic Gymnastics World Cup series	4	4	6
2019	2019 FIG Artistic Gymnastics World Cup series	4	4	6
2020	2020 FIG Artistic Gymnastics World Cup series	2	1	1
2021	2021 FIG Artistic Gymnastics World Cup series	1	—N/a	5
2022	2022 FIG Artistic Gymnastics World Cup series	4	—N/a	6
2023	2023 FIG Artistic Gymnastics World Cup series	4	—N/a	6
2024	2024 FIG Artistic Gymnastics World Cup series	4	—N/a	5
2025	2025 FIG Artistic Gymnastics World Cup series	6	—N/a	5
2026	2026 FIG Artistic Gymnastics World Cup series	6	—N/a	5

== Hosts ==
A number of nations across six different continents have hosted the events, including the World Cup Finals, World Cup qualifiers, as well as the World Cup and World Challenge Cup stages from 1975 to 2024.

Continent	Nations (Times Hosted)
Africa	Egypt (4)
Asia	China (5), Iran (1), Japan (7), Qatar (16), South Korea (1)
Europe	Azerbaijan (8), Belgium (8), Bulgaria (7), Croatia (15), Czech Republic (5), France (17), Germany (45), Great Britain (23), Greece (1), Hungary (9), Israel (1), Portugal (7), Russia (5), Slovenia (20), Spain (3), Switzerland (2), Turkey (7), Yugoslavia (1)
North America	Canada (4), United States (11)
Oceania	Australia (4)
South America	Argentina (1), Brazil (6), Chile (1), Colombia (1)

== Olympic qualification ==
FIG announced prior to the 2016 Summer Olympics that the test event for the 2020 Summer Olympics in Tokyo, Japan and subsequent Olympics would no longer serve to qualify additional teams and individual event specialists. Instead, placements at the World Championships in the two years prior to the Olympics would determine the qualified teams, while individual athletes would have a number of ways to qualify: World Championships all-around and event placement, all-around placement at the numerous continental championships in the Olympic Year, and the Cup series.

FIG later released a video explaining the specifics of the new qualification process, including the role of the various World Cup series. While the World Challenge Cup Series remains strictly a series of individual competitions, the final All-Around World Cup (C-II) series and Individual Apparatus World Cup (C-III) series gain importance as they allow gymnasts to qualify additional spots to the Olympic Games. Specifically, the first, second, and third-place finishing countries in the All-Around World Cup series in the Olympic year each qualify a non-nominative spot to the Olympic Games in addition to the four team spots qualified at a previous World Championship. The winning countries are announced in the spring, and they are required to give the spot to a gymnast by the deadline shortly before the Olympics that summer.

The Individual Apparatus World Cup series allows four additional gymnasts to qualify Olympic spots. The overall winner on each apparatus for the series beginning two years before the Olympics and concluding the spring of the Olympic year wins a nominative spot to the Olympics, meaning they are not dependent on their countries' federation to grant them a spot. Each gymnast can only qualify as the winner of one event, meaning if a gymnast wins the series on both uneven bars and balance beam, they still only use one of the available spots to qualify to the Olympics.

Additionally, countries that have already qualified a full team at a prior World Championship can only win up to one additional spot from each Cup series. If a gymnast from a previously qualified country wins the overall vault series title, and another gymnast from the same country wins the floor exercise title, a tiebreaker is used to determine which one qualifies to the Olympic Games. However, if the overall winners of the two apparatus series are both from a country which has not qualified a full team at the World Championships, both advance to the Olympics.

The FIG also announced a policy to prevent countries from using one gymnast to qualify multiple spots to the Olympics so that the spots would be most accurately distributed based on a country's depth. Gymnasts are not allowed to qualify spots from multiple different ways. Spots are awarded in chronological order, meaning the first spots are awarded at the World Championships in the two years prior to the Olympics, followed by the non-nominative spots won by countries in the All-Around World Cup series in the spring of the Olympic year, followed by the nominative spots won by individual gymnasts in the Individual Apparatus World Cup series, followed by the non-nominative spots won by gymnasts at the continental championships generally held in the summer.

The qualification rule combined with the chronological awarding of spots has two major consequences. First, since countries that qualified full teams are only eligible for two additional, non-team spots, if they win a non-nominative spot at the All-Around World Cup series and a nominative spot at the Individual Apparatus World Cup series, they are ineligible to earn a third additional spot, even if their gymnast wins the continental championship. Second, gymnasts who competed at the World Championships and qualified a spot with the team are not eligible to qualify a spot through the Individual Apparatus World Cup series or the continental championships, as these spots, whether nominative or non-nominative, are won by an individual gymnast. They are, however, still eligible to be named to a non-nominative individual spot for their country and compete at the Olympics as long as an eligible gymnast won the spot they are using. Despite this option, in 2018 several gymnasts decided to try to win a nominative spot through the Individual Apparatus World Cup series over the next two years. In anticipation of their countries' qualifying a full team to the Olympics at the 2018 World Championships, several gymnasts, most notably uneven bars specialist Fan Yilin of China, vault and floor exercise specialist Jade Carey of the United States, and vault specialist Maria Paseka of Russia announced that they would not try to qualify for the World Championships so that they would not be prevented from qualifying a nominative spot through the Individual Apparatus World Cup series.

== Successful nations ==
What follows is a list of nations which have earned at least one medal at the Artistic Gymnastics World Cup circuit. Results accounted for include: 1) FIG World Cup Final events, staged between 1975 and 2008; 2) all of the stages from the World Cup series (including World Cup Qualifiers from 1997 to 2008) up to 2024; and 3) all of the stages from the World Challenge Cup events, since 2011.

- Albania
- Algeria
- Argentina
- Armenia
- Australia
- Austria
- Azerbaijan
- Belarus
- Belgium
- Brazil
- Bulgaria
- Canada
- Chile
- China
- Chinese Taipei
- Colombia
- Croatia
- Cuba
- Cyprus
- Czech Republic
- Czechoslovakia
- Denmark
- Dominican Republic
- East Germany
- Egypt
- Finland
- France
- Georgia
- Germany
- Great Britain
- Greece
- Guatemala
- Hong Kong
- Hungary
- Iceland
- India
- Indonesia
- Iran
- Ireland
- Israel
- Italy
- Japan
- Jordan
- Kazakhstan
- Latvia
- Lithuania
- Luxembourg
- Malaysia
- Mexico
- Mongolia
- Morocco
- Netherlands
- New Zealand
- North Korea
- Norway
- Panama
- Peru
- Philippines
- Poland
- Portugal
- Puerto Rico
- Romania
- Russia
- Serbia
- Slovakia
- Slovenia
- South Africa
- South Korea
- Soviet Union
- Spain
- Sweden
- Switzerland
- Syria
- Tunisia
- Turkey
- Ukraine
- United States
- Uzbekistan
- Venezuela
- Vietnam
- West Germany

== See also ==
- FIG World Cup
- List of medalists at the FIG World Cup Final
- Rhythmic Gymnastics World Cup
