= Edgar Jorek =

German gymnast

- Born: 2 December 1955 (age 70) Wolfsburg, West Germany
- Height: 1.65 m (5 ft 5 in)

Gymnastics career
- Discipline: Men's artistic gymnastics
- Country represented: West Germany
- Club: VfL Wolfsburg

Edgar Jorek (born 2 December 1955) is a German gymnast. He competed in eight events at the 1976 Summer Olympics.
