= Marilena Neacșu =

Romanian artistic gymnast

- Born: 15 August 1961 (age 65) Sibiu

Gymnastics career
- Discipline: Women's artistic gymnastics
- Country represented: Romania
- Head coach: Béla Károlyi
- Assistant coach: Marta Károlyi
- Former coaches: Nicolae Buzoianu, Cristl Voiciulescu
- Choreographer: Geza Pozar
Medal record
World Championships
Silver medal – second place	1978 Strasbourg	Team

Marilena Neacșu (born 15 August 1961 in Sibiu, Romania) is a retired Romanian artistic gymnast. She won a silver medal with the Romanian team at the 1978 World Championships and was an alternate for the 1976 Summer Olympics.

Neacșu appeared in the 1990 Romanian/Canadian movie Campioana ("Reach for the Sky", or "La championne" in French). While shooting for the movie, she met her future husband, who was part of the crew. She then moved with him to Montreal, where they married and had three children.

Neacșu currently works at the "Club de gymnastique artistique Gadbois" in Montreal as a gymnastics coach. Her stepfather is Canadian film producer Rock Demers.
