= Stella Zakharova =

Soviet gymnast

- Стелла Георгіївна Захарова
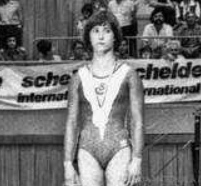
- Zakharova at the 1981 Summer Universiade

Personal information
- Born: 12 July 1963 (age 63) Odesa, Ukraine

Gymnastics career
- Discipline: Women's artistic gymnastics
- Country represented: Soviet Union
Medal record
Representing Soviet Union
Olympic Games
Gold medal – first place	1980 Moscow	Team
World Championships
Gold medal – first place	1981 Moscow	Team
Silver medal – second place	1979 Fort Worth	Team
Silver medal – second place	1979 Fort Worth	Vault
Silver medal – second place	1981 Moscow	Vault
World Cup Final
Gold medal – first place	1979 Tokyo	All-Around
Gold medal – first place	1980 Toronto	All-Around
Gold medal – first place	1980 Toronto	Vault
Silver medal – second place	1979 Tokyo	Vault
Silver medal – second place	1979 Tokyo	Floor Exercise
Silver medal – second place	1980 Toronto	Floor Exercise
Bronze medal – third place	1979 Tokyo	Uneven Bars
Summer Universiade
Gold medal – first place	1981 Bucharest	Vault
Silver medal – second place	1981 Bucharest	Team
Silver medal – second place	1981 Bucharest	All-Around
Bronze medal – third place	1981 Bucharest	Balance Beam
Bronze medal – third place	1981 Bucharest	Floor Exercise

Stella Heorhiivna Zakharova (born 12 July 1963) is a retired gymnast who competed internationally for the former Soviet Union between 1977 and 1982. She won gold in the team event at the 1980 Summer Olympics and the 1981 World Championships, as well as team silver at the 1979 World Championships. Individually, she won two silver vault medals at the World Championships (1979, 1981). She is currently vice-president of the men's artistic gymnastics division in the Ukrainian Gymnastics Federation.

== Career ==
Zakharova won her first all-around championship at the 1976 All-Union School Spartakiade. That same year, she placed second overall in the Junior USSR Championships. Zakharova was the first woman to incorporate three double back somersaults into her floor routine and specialized in vault and floor exercise.

She broke her leg in 1977. She returned to the gym to train on the uneven bars while her leg was still in a cast.

Zakhrova's most successful year was 1979, during which she won the individual all-around at the American Cup, Moscow News, and World Cup events. At the World Championships held in Fort Worth, Texas, she was a member of the Soviet women's team, which finished second.

In 1980, Zakharova continued to enjoy success, winning the gold medal with her Soviet teammates at the Olympic Games and capturing a second all-around title at the World Cup. Zakharova later said that when she stood on the podium with her Olympic teammates, she "felt emptiness" due to the immense pressure of preparing for the Games.

The year after, she won silver in the all-around at the 1981 Summer Universiade, along with gold on vault and bronze on the balance beam and floor exercise. The Soviet team won silver as well. She won team gold and a second World vault silver medal at the 1981 World Championships.

After placing 40th in the preliminary round of the 1982 Soviet championships, she retired from competition.

Footage of Zakharova training with the Soviet national team was captured in a 1978 Soviet Gymnastics training documentary. Also included in the film are teammates Elena Mukhina, Natalia Shaposhnikova and Maria Filatova.

== Post-competitive career ==
Zakharova has worked as a judge. Despite past conflicts with the Ukrainian Gymnastics Federation, she is currently the vice-president of its men's artistic gymnastics division.

In 2000, she founded her own gymnastics competition, the Zakharova Cup.

== Personal life ==
Zakharova married Dynamo Kyiv football player Viktor Khlus, with whom she has a son and daughter. She graduated from the Kharkiv State Academy of Physical Culture.
