= Věra Černá =

Czech artistic gymnast (1963–2024)

Medal record

Women's artistic gymnastics

Representing Czechoslovakia

World Championships
| Gold medal – first place | 1979 Fort Worth | Balance beam |

Věra Černá (17 May 1963 – 30 September 2024) was a Czech artistic gymnast. She won the balance beam title at the 1979 World Championships.

Černá died on 30 September 2024, at the age of 61.

== Competitive history ==
| Year | Event | Team | AA | VT | UB | BB | FX |
Junior
| 1975 | Junior CSSR-ROM Dual Meet | 1st place, gold medalist(s) | 4 | | | | |
| 1976 | Junior Friendship Tournament | 5 | | | | 8 | |
Senior
| 1977 | Antibes International | | 4 | | | 3rd place, bronze medalist(s) | |
| 1977 | CSSR Championships | | 2nd place, silver medalist(s) | | 1st place, gold medalist(s) | | 1st place, gold medalist(s) |
| 1977 | CSSR-USSR Dual Meet | 2nd place, silver medalist(s) | 1st place, gold medalist(s) | | | | |
| 1977 | CSSR-POL Dual Meet | 1st place, gold medalist(s) | 1st place, gold medalist(s) | | | | |
| 1977 | European Championships | | 18 | | | | |
| 1977 | Junior TCH-USSR Dual Meet | | 1st place, gold medalist(s) | | | | |
| 1977 | World Cup Final | | 6 | 7 | 8 | | 2nd place, silver medalist(s) |
| 1978 | American Cup | | 4 | | | | |
| 1978 | Calgary International Invitational | | 1st place, gold medalist(s) | | | | |
| 1978 | Champions All | | 10 | | | | |
| 1978 | CSSR Championships | | 2nd place, silver medalist(s) | | | | |
| 1978 | HUN-POL-TCH-FRA Quad Meet | | 1st place, gold medalist(s) | | | | |
| 1978 | Ontario Cup | | 4 | | | | |
| 1978 | Pioneer International Gymnastics Classic | | | | | 2nd place, silver medalist(s) | 2nd place, silver medalist(s) |
| 1978 | RSFSR-CSSR Dual Meet | 2nd place, silver medalist(s) | 3rd place, bronze medalist(s) | | 1st place, gold medalist(s) | 2nd place, silver medalist(s) | 3rd place, bronze medalist(s) |
| 1978 | CSSR World Trials | | 2nd place, silver medalist(s) | | | | |
| 1978 | World Cup Final | | 4 | 8 | 2nd place, silver medalist(s) | 1st place, gold medalist(s) | |
| 1978 | World Championships | 6 | 6 | | 7 | 5 | 6 |
| 1979 | Coca Cola International | | 1st place, gold medalist(s) | 4 | 1st place, gold medalist(s) | 1st place, gold medalist(s) | 2nd place, silver medalist(s) |
| 1979 | European Championships | | 6 | 6 | 8 | | 6 |
| 1979 | HOL-CSSR Dual Meet | 1st place, gold medalist(s) | 1st place, gold medalist(s) | | | | |
| 1979 | Kosice International | | 1st place, gold medalist(s) | 2nd place, silver medalist(s) | 1st place, gold medalist(s) | | 2nd place, silver medalist(s) |
| 1979 | Pre-Olympics | | 5 | | 7 | 2nd place, silver medalist(s) | 4 |
| 1979 | World Championships | 5 | 6 | | | 1st place, gold medalist(s) | 6 |
| 1980 | Kosice International | | 3rd place, bronze medalist(s) | 2nd place, silver medalist(s) | | | |
