= Rhonda Schwandt =

American gymnast

Rhonda Schwandt is an American gymnast.

== Competitions ==
In 1978 she won a gold medal in vaulting competition during the Moscow News Gymnastics Tournament, as well as a bronze medal on parallel bars and balance beam. In 1979 she won the all-around title at the Pacific Gymnastics Championships.

== Original "Supersister" ==
In 1979, the Supersisters trading card set was produced and distributed; one of the cards featured Schwandt's name and picture.
