= 1975 FIG Artistic Gymnastics World Cup =

International gymnastics competition

The 1975 Artistic Gymnastics World Cup was held in London, England in 1975.

== Medal winners ==
Event	Gold	Silver	Bronze	Ref.
Men's individual all-around	(Soviet Union) Nikolay Andrianov	(Japan) Hiroshi Kajiyama	(Soviet Union) Aleksandr Dityatin	
Women's individual all-around	(Soviet Union) Ludmilla Tourischeva	(Soviet Union) Olga Korbut	(Hungary) Márta Egervári (Soviet Union) Elvira Saadi	
Men's floor exercise	(Japan) Hiroshi Kajiyama	(Soviet Union) Nikolay Andrianov	(Soviet Union) Vladimir Safronov	
Men's pommel horse	(Hungary) Zoltán Magyar	(Soviet Union) Nikolay Andrianov	(Japan) Hiroshi Kajiyama	
Men's still rings	(Japan) Mitsuo Tsukahara	(Japan) Fumio Honma	(Romania) Dan Grecu	
Men's vault	(Soviet Union) Paata Shamugia	(Japan) Hiroshi Kajiyama	(Soviet Union) Vladimir Safronov	
Men's parallel bars	(Soviet Union) Nikolay Andrianov	(Japan) Hiroshi Kajiyama (Japan) Mitsuo Tsukahara	None awarded	
Men's horizontal bar	(Japan) Mitsuo Tsukahara	(West Germany) Eberhard Gienger	(Japan) Hiroshi Kajiyama	
Women's vault	(Soviet Union) Ludmilla Tourischeva	(Soviet Union) Elvira Saadi (Soviet Union) Olga Koval	None awarded	
Women's uneven bars	(Soviet Union) Ludmilla Tourischeva	(Soviet Union) Lidia Gorbik	(Soviet Union) Elvira Saadi	
Women's balance beam	(Soviet Union) Ludmilla Tourischeva	(Hungary) Márta Egervári	(Soviet Union) Elvira Saadi	
Women's floor exercise	(Soviet Union) Ludmilla Tourischeva	(Romania) Teodora Ungureanu (Soviet Union) Elvira Saadi	None awarded	
