= Steffi Kräker =

German gymnast (born 1960)

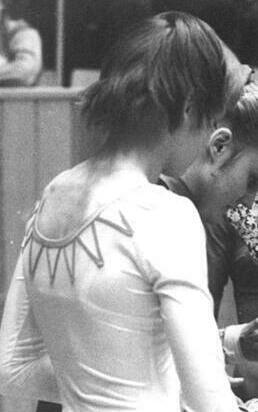

Personal information
- Born: 21 April 1960 (age 66) Leipzig, East Germany

Gymnastics career
- Discipline: Women's artistic gymnastics
- Country represented: East Germany; (1976–81 (GDR))
Medal record
Representing East Germany
Olympic Games
Silver medal – second place	1980 Moscow	Vault
Bronze medal – third place	1976 Montreal	Team
Bronze medal – third place	1980 Moscow	Team
Bronze medal – third place	1980 Moscow	Uneven Bars
World Championships
Bronze medal – third place	1978 Strasbourg	Team
Bronze medal – third place	1978 Strasbourg	Vault
Bronze medal – third place	1979 Fort Worth	Team
Bronze medal – third place	1979 Fort Worth	Vault
Bronze medal – third place	1981 Moscow	Team
Bronze medal – third place	1981 Moscow	Vault
World Cup Final
Gold medal – first place	1978 São Paulo	Uneven Bars
Gold medal – first place	1979 Tokyo	Uneven Bars
Silver medal – second place	1977 Oviedo	All-Around
Silver medal – second place	1977 Oviedo	Balance Beam
Silver medal – second place	1977 Oviedo	Floor Exercise
Silver medal – second place	1980 Toronto	Uneven Bars
Bronze medal – third place	1977 Oviedo	Uneven Bars
Bronze medal – third place	1980 Toronto	All-Around
European Championships
Bronze medal – third place	1977 Prague	Uneven Bars

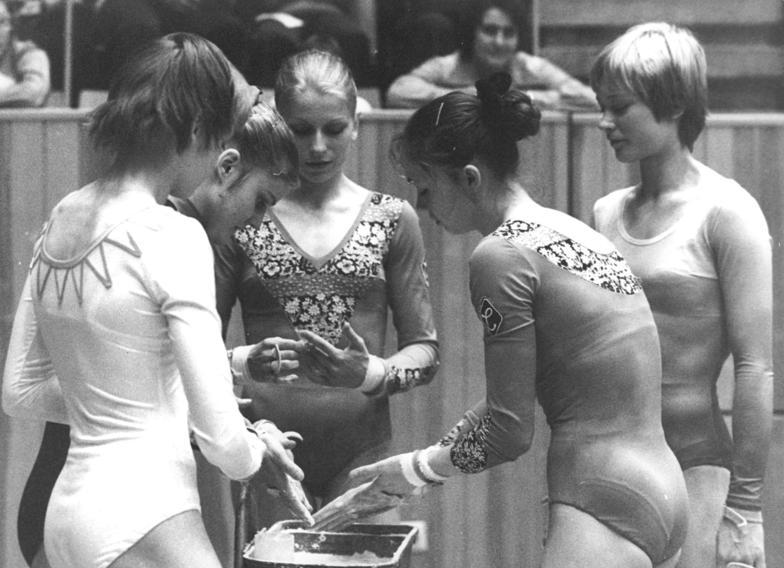
Bundesarchiv Bild 183-R0321-0001, Steffi Kräker, Marion Kische, Gitta Escher, Ricarda Schmeißer, Angelika Hellmann

Stefanie Biskupek-Kräker (née Kräker; 21 April 1960) is a German former gymnast who competed for East Germany at the 1976 and 1980 Olympic Games. Over her career she won four Olympic medals and six world championship medals.

== Career ==
Kräker began competing on the GDR national team in 1976. One of her earliest senior competitions was the 1976 Summer Olympics in Montreal, where she won a team bronze medal.

Following these Olympics Kräker emerged as a major member of the GDR team. In 1977 she became the 1977 GDR national champion and won a bronze on the uneven bars at the 1977 European Championships. At the 1978 World Championships in Strasbourg she won two bronze medals: team and vault. At the 1979 World Championships in Fort Worth she again won bronze with the team and on vault.

The 1980 Olympic Games were Kräker's most successful championship; she received team and bars bronze medals and a silver medal on the vault. Kräker's last major competition was the 1981 World Championships in Moscow where she won team and vault bronze medals.

Kräker was awarded the Patriotic Order of Merit in 1980.

== Post-retirement ==
After her retirement, Biskupek-Kräker became an international judge.

Biskupek-Kräker now works as a child psychologist and psychotherapist in her hometown of Leipzig. She was inducted into the International Gymnastics Hall of Fame in 2011.

== Eponymous skill ==
Kräker has one eponymous skill listed in the Code of Points.

Apparatus	Name	Description	Difficulty (Note: Valid for the 2025–2028 Code of Points)
Uneven bars	Kraeker	Underswing with half turn, tucked back salto with full-turn	D (0.4)

== See also ==
- 1979 World Artistic Gymnastics Championships
- 1981 World Artistic Gymnastics Championships
- Gymnastics at the 1976 Summer Olympics
- Gymnastics at the 1980 Summer Olympics
- List of Olympic medalists in gymnastics (women)
